= 1975 South American Championships in Athletics – Results =

These are the results of the 1975 South American Championships in Athletics which took place at the Estádio Célio de Barros in Rio de Janeiro, Brazil, between 26 and 31 August.

== Men's results ==
=== 100 metres ===
Heats – 26 August

Rank	Heat	Name	Nationality	Time	Notes
1	1	Rui da Silva	Brazil	10.5	Q
2	1	Carlos Martínez	Argentina	10.8	Q
3	1	Julio Escobar	Colombia	10.9	Q
4	1	Sergio Labruna	Uruguay	11.0	Q
1	2	Gustavo Dubarbier	Argentina	10.4	Q
2	2	Nelson dos Santos	Brazil	10.6	Q
3	2	José Pérez-Albella	Peru	10.8	Q
4	2	Benjamín Herrera	Colombia	11.0	Q
5	2	Néstor Ibarra	Uruguay	11.2	

Final – 27 August

Rank	Name	Nationality	Time	Notes
1st place, gold medalist(s)	Rui da Silva	Brazil	10.5	
2nd place, silver medalist(s)	Nelson dos Santos	Brazil	10.7	
3rd place, bronze medalist(s)	Gustavo Dubarbier	Argentina	10.7	
4	Carlos Martínez	Argentina	10.9	
5	José Pérez-Albella	Peru	10.9	
6	Julio Escobar	Colombia	10.9	
7	Sergio Labruna	Uruguay	10.9	
8	Benjamín Herrera	Colombia	11.1	

=== 200 metres ===
29 August

Rank	Name	Nationality	Time	Notes
1st place, gold medalist(s)	Rui da Silva	Brazil	20.9	=CR
2nd place, silver medalist(s)	Jorge Mathias	Brazil	21.5	
3rd place, bronze medalist(s)	Gustavo Dubarbier	Argentina	21.5	
4	Julio Escobar	Colombia	21.6	
5	Carlos Martínez	Argentina	22.1	
6	José Pérez-Albella	Peru	22.1	
7	Gabriel Lopera	Colombia	22.2	
8	Jorge do Prado	Uruguay	23.3	

=== 400 metres ===
27 August

Rank	Name	Nationality	Time	Notes
1st place, gold medalist(s)	Delmo da Silva	Brazil	47.0	
2nd place, silver medalist(s)	Jesús Villegas	Colombia	48.0	
3rd place, bronze medalist(s)	Pedro Teixeira	Brazil	48.4	
4	Carlos Bertotti	Argentina	48.6	
5	Gabriel Lopera	Colombia	49.5	
6	Raúl Ham	Argentina	50.4	

=== 800 metres ===
27 August

Rank	Name	Nationality	Time	Notes
1st place, gold medalist(s)	Carlos Villar	Argentina	1:50.6	
2nd place, silver medalist(s)	Darcy Pereira	Brazil	1:51.4	
3rd place, bronze medalist(s)	Agberto Guimarães	Brazil	1:51.8	
5	Reinel Suárez	Colombia	1:53.6	
6	Abel Godoy	Uruguay	1:54.0	
7	Jesús Barrero	Colombia	1:58.0	
8	Rubén Buscalia	Argentina	2:00.9	

=== 1500 metres ===
29 August

Rank	Name	Nationality	Time	Notes
1st place, gold medalist(s)	Jesús Barrero	Colombia	3:50.2	
2nd place, silver medalist(s)	Abel Córdoba	Argentina	3:50.9	
3rd place, bronze medalist(s)	Cosme do Nascimento	Brazil	3:52.4	
4	Domingo Tibaduiza	Colombia	3:54.7	
5	Edmundo Warnke	Chile	3:56.8	
6	Abel Godoy	Uruguay	3:58.8	
7	Carlos Villar	Argentina	4:14.5	
	Darcy Pereira	Brazil	DQ	

=== 5000 metres ===
28 August

Rank	Name	Nationality	Time	Notes
1st place, gold medalist(s)	Domingo Tibaduiza	Colombia	14:01.2	CR
2nd place, silver medalist(s)	Víctor Mora	Colombia	14:02.2	
3rd place, bronze medalist(s)	Edmundo Warnke	Chile	14:05.6	
4	Elói Schleder	Brazil	14:20.6	
5	Aloisio de Araújo	Brazil	14:40.6	
6	Luis Tipán	Ecuador	14:53.8	
7	Luis Castro	Ecuador	14:57.6	
8	Adolfo Olivera	Argentina	15:01.6	
9	Hugo Gavino	Peru	NT	

=== 10,000 metres ===
26 August

Rank	Name	Nationality	Time	Notes
1st place, gold medalist(s)	Víctor Mora	Colombia	28:45.8	CR
2nd place, silver medalist(s)	Domingo Tibaduiza	Colombia	28:45.8	
3rd place, bronze medalist(s)	Edmundo Warnke	Chile	28:46.2	
4	José Romão Silva	Brazil	29:05.4	
5	Carlos Alves	Brazil	29:28.2	
6	Luis Tipán	Ecuador	30:46.4	
7	Adolfo Olivera	Argentina	31:43.4	

=== Marathon ===
30 August – Doubtful distance

Rank	Name	Nationality	Time	Notes
1st place, gold medalist(s)	Héctor Rodríguez	Colombia	2:12:09	
2nd place, silver medalist(s)	Brígido Ferreira	Brazil	2:21:56	
3rd place, bronze medalist(s)	César Pastrano	Ecuador	2:28:55	
4	Decio Castro	Brazil	2:32:16	
5	Higinio Bustos	Chile	2:33:00	
6	Mario Valdivia	Chile	2:35:33	

=== 110 metres hurdles ===
31 August

Rank	Name	Nationality	Time	Notes
1st place, gold medalist(s)	Márcio Lomónaco	Brazil	14.2	CR
2nd place, silver medalist(s)	Jesús Villegas	Colombia	14.4	
3rd place, bronze medalist(s)	Alfredo Guzmán	Chile	14.8	
4	John Streeter	Chile	15.1	
5	Tito Steiner	Argentina	15.1	
6	Hugo Tanino	Argentina	15.2	
7	Carlos Alberto Alves	Brazil	15.4	

=== 400 metres hurdles ===
29 August

Rank	Name	Nationality	Time	Notes
1st place, gold medalist(s)	Jesús Villegas	Colombia	50.8	CR
2nd place, silver medalist(s)	Fabio Zúñiga	Colombia	51.2	
3rd place, bronze medalist(s)	Aroldo Evangelista da Silva	Brazil	51.7	
4	Hugo Tanino	Argentina	52.1	
5	Alfredo Guzmán	Chile	52.9	
6	Juan Carlos Dyrzka	Argentina	53.3	
7	Juan Santiago Gordón	Chile	54.0	
8	Antônio Feijão	Brazil	54.8	

=== 3000 metres steeplechase ===
31 August

Rank	Name	Nationality	Time	Notes
1st place, gold medalist(s)	José Romão Silva	Brazil	8:46.0	CR
2nd place, silver medalist(s)	Víctor Mora	Colombia	8:53.8	
3rd place, bronze medalist(s)	Jesús Barrero	Colombia	9:00.4	
4	Antônio Ranzani	Brazil	9:01.2	
5	Abel Córdoba	Argentina	9:08.8	
6	Luis Castro	Ecuador	9:14.2	
7	Hugo Gavino	Peru	10:08.8	

=== 4 × 100 metres relay ===
31 August

Rank	Nation	Competitors	Time	Notes
1st place, gold medalist(s)	Brazil	Ronaldo Lobato, Nelson dos Santos, João Carlos de Oliveira, Rui da Silva	40.8	
2nd place, silver medalist(s)	Colombia	Benjamín Herrera, Jesús Villegas, Fabio Zúñiga, Julio Escobar	41.3	
3rd place, bronze medalist(s)	Argentina	Carlos Martínez, Carlos Bertotti, Raúl Ham, Gustavo Dubarbier	41.5	
4	Chile	Alejandro Kapsch, Francisco Pichott, Juan Santiago Gordón, John Streeter	41.5	

=== 4 × 400 metres relay ===
31 August

Rank	Nation	Competitors	Time	Notes
1st place, gold medalist(s)	Brazil	Geraldo Silva, Aroldo Evangelista da Silva, Pedro Teixeira, Delmo da Silva	3:09.2	CR
2nd place, silver medalist(s)	Argentina	Gustavo Dubarbier, Rubén Buscaglia, Hugo Tanino, Carlos Bertotti	3:14.6	
3rd place, bronze medalist(s)	Chile	Alfredo Guzmán, Juan Santiago Gordón, Francisco Pichott, Alfredo Silva	3:22.1	
4	Colombia	Gabriel Lopera, Julio Escobar, Fabio Zúñiga, Jesús Villegas	3:25.1	
5	Uruguay	Néstor Ibarra, Jorge do Prado, Sergio Labruna, Abel Godoy	3:33.1	

=== 20 kilometres walk ===
31 August

Rank	Name	Nationality	Time	Notes
1st place, gold medalist(s)	Ernesto Alfaro	Colombia	1:39:12	CR
2nd place, silver medalist(s)	Rafael Vega	Colombia	1:39:52	
3rd place, bronze medalist(s)	Adalberto Scorza	Argentina	1:42:15	
4	Carlos Bianchi	Brazil	1:43:16	
5	Rito Molina	Argentina	1:45:47	
6	Fernando Elias	Brazil	1:47:43	
7	Miguel de la Torre	Peru	1:52:31	

=== High jump ===
31 August

Rank	Name	Nationality	Result	Notes
1st place, gold medalist(s)	Benedito Francisco	Brazil	2.10	CR
2nd place, silver medalist(s)	Luis Barrionuevo	Argentina	2.03	
3rd place, bronze medalist(s)	Daniel Mamet	Argentina	2.03	
4	Óscar Rodríguez	Chile	2.00	
5	Hermes Cabal	Colombia	2.00	
6	Roberto Abugattás	Peru	2.00	
7	Renato Bortolocci	Brazil	1.95	
8	Alfredo Silva	Chile	1.90	

=== Pole vault ===
30 August

Rank	Name	Nationality	Result	Notes
1st place, gold medalist(s)	Renato Bortolocci	Brazil	4.50	=CR
2nd place, silver medalist(s)	Ciro Valdés	Colombia	4.50	
3rd place, bronze medalist(s)	Fernando Ruocco	Uruguay	4.00	
4	Hans Miethe	Chile	3.60	
5	Roberto Steinmetz	Argentina	3.40	
	Armando Chiamulera	Brazil	NM	
	Guillermo Chiaraviglio	Argentina	NM	

=== Long jump ===
27 August

Rank	Name	Nationality	Result	Notes
1st place, gold medalist(s)	João Carlos de Oliveira	Brazil	7.66	CR
2nd place, silver medalist(s)	Emilio Mazzeo	Argentina	7.39	
3rd place, bronze medalist(s)	Ronaldo Lobato	Brazil	7.33	
4	Alejandro Kapsch	Chile	7.17	
5	Ronald Raborg	Peru	7.04	
6	Francisco Pichott	Chile	6.81	
7	Jorge do Prado	Uruguay	6.39	
8	Angel Gagliano	Argentina	6.38	

=== Triple jump ===
26 August

Rank	Name	Nationality	Result	Notes
1st place, gold medalist(s)	João Carlos de Oliveira	Brazil	16.48	CR
2nd place, silver medalist(s)	Nelson Prudêncio	Brazil	16.45	
3rd place, bronze medalist(s)	Francisco Pichott	Chile	15.07	
4	Angel Gagliano	Argentina	15.07	
5	Hermes Cabal	Colombia	15.00	
6	Emilio Mazzeo	Argentina	14.59	

=== Shot put ===
26 August

Rank	Name	Nationality	Result	Notes
1st place, gold medalist(s)	Juan Adolfo Turri	Argentina	18.21	CR
2nd place, silver medalist(s)	José Carlos Jacques	Brazil	16.53	
3rd place, bronze medalist(s)	José Luiz Carabolante	Brazil	16.39	
4	Mario Peretti	Argentina	15.00	
5	Darwin Piñeyrúa	Uruguay	14.50	
6	Modesto Barreto	Colombia	14.16	

=== Discus throw ===
27 August

Rank	Name	Nationality	Result	Notes
1st place, gold medalist(s)	Sérgio Thomé	Brazil	50.84	
2nd place, silver medalist(s)	José Carlos Jacques	Brazil	49.64	
3rd place, bronze medalist(s)	Mario Peretti	Argentina	47.82	
4	Modesto Barreto	Colombia	?	
5	Juan Adolfo Turri	Argentina	45.58	
6	Darwin Piñeyrúa	Uruguay	43.04	

=== Hammer throw ===
30 August

Rank	Name	Nationality	Result	Notes
1st place, gold medalist(s)	Darwin Piñeyrúa	Uruguay	61.20	
2nd place, silver medalist(s)	José Alberto Vallejo	Argentina	61.10	
3rd place, bronze medalist(s)	Celso de Moraes	Brazil	60.84	
4	Clovis da Silva	Brazil	53.72	
5	Daniel Gómez	Argentina	49.82	
6	Tulio Tebaldi	Peru	46.98	

=== Javelin throw ===
31 August – Old model

Rank	Name	Nationality	Result	Notes
1st place, gold medalist(s)	Jorge Peña	Chile	71.74	CR
2nd place, silver medalist(s)	Mario Sotomayor	Colombia	71.16	
3rd place, bronze medalist(s)	Paulo de Faría	Brazil	69.40	
4	Angel Garmendia	Argentina	66.20	
5	Néstor Pietrobelli	Argentina	63.00	
6	Ivam Duarte	Brazil	55.44	

=== Decathlon ===
28–29 August – 1962 tables (1985 conversions given with *)

The highest mark recorded in each event is highlighted in yellow

Rank	Athlete	Nationality	100m	LJ	SP	HJ	400m	110m H	DT	PV	JT	1500m	Points	Conv.	Notes
1st place, gold medalist(s)	Tito Steiner	Argentina	11.3	7.00	14.69	1.98	49.7	14.9	41.74	4.10	53.66	4:37.3	7615	7454*	AR
2nd place, silver medalist(s)	Geraldo Rodrigues	Brazil	10.7	7.24	11.25	1.97	49.5	14.8	35.74	2.90	50.44	5:06.0	6939	6791*	
3rd place, bronze medalist(s)	Alfredo Silva	Chile	11.2	6.87	11.71	2.00	51.7	15.8	34.78	3.50	44.94	4:45.0	6794	6604*	
4	Roberto Steinmetz	Argentina	11.5	6.65	12.21	1.85	53.7	16.5	40.46	3.40	57.70	4:58.6	6622	6433*	
5	Paulo Hasse	Brazil	11.6	6.45	10.84	1.85	53.7	17.4	31.40	3.60	54.58	5:21.1	6093	5963*	
6	Hans Miethe	Chile	11.5	6.92	11.37	1.78	52.6	15.7	34.78	NM	43.66	5:18.4	5620	5589*	

== Women's results ==
=== 100 metres ===
Heats – 28 August

Rank	Heat	Name	Nationality	Time	Notes
1	1	Silvina Pereira	Brazil	11.7	Q, =CR
2	1	Beatriz Allocco	Argentina	11.9	Q
3	1	Leslie Cooper	Chile	12.1	Q
4	1	Rocío Rebollo	Uruguay	12.3	Q
5	1	Simone Krauthausen	Peru	12.3	
1	2	Liliana Cragno	Argentina	12.0	Q
2	2	Carmela Bolívar	Peru	12.1	Q
3	2	Josefa Vicent	Uruguay	12.1	Q
4	2	Maria Amorim	Brazil	12.2	Q

Final – 29 August

Rank	Name	Nationality	Time	Notes
1st place, gold medalist(s)	Silvina Pereira	Brazil	11.7	=CR
2nd place, silver medalist(s)	Carmela Bolívar	Peru	11.9	
3rd place, bronze medalist(s)	Beatriz Allocco	Argentina	11.9	
4	Josefa Vicent	Uruguay	12.0	
5	Maria Amorim	Brazil	12.1	
6	Leslie Cooper	Chile	12.1	
7	Liliana Cragno	Argentina	12.1	
8	Rocío Rebollo	Uruguay	12.2	

=== 200 metres ===
27 August

Rank	Name	Nationality	Time	Notes
1st place, gold medalist(s)	Silvina Pereira	Brazil	23.4	AR
2nd place, silver medalist(s)	Beatriz Allocco	Argentina	24.2	
3rd place, bronze medalist(s)	Margarita Grun	Uruguay	24.9	
4	Carmela Bolívar	Peru	25.0	
5	Josefa Vicent	Uruguay	25.0	
6	Maria Amorim	Brazil	25.3	
7	Belkis Fava	Argentina	25.4	
8	Silvia Hormazábal	Chile	26.8	

=== 400 metres ===
29 August

Rank	Name	Nationality	Time	Notes
1st place, gold medalist(s)	Alejandra Ramos	Chile	55.7	
2nd place, silver medalist(s)	Valdéa Chagas	Brazil	55.9	
3rd place, bronze medalist(s)	Miriam da Silva	Brazil	56.0	
4	Margarita Grun	Uruguay	56.2	
5	Adriana Britos	Argentina	57.2	
6	Silvia Hormazábal	Chile	57.8	
7	Graciela Ghelfi	Argentina	58.0	
8	Laura Oyhanctábal	Uruguay	58.2	

=== 800 metres ===
31 August

Rank	Name	Nationality	Time	Notes
1st place, gold medalist(s)	Ana María Nielsen	Argentina	2:10.7	CR
2nd place, silver medalist(s)	Rosângela Verissimo	Brazil	2:10.8	
3rd place, bronze medalist(s)	Alejandra Ramos	Chile	2:12.1	
4	Maria da Silva	Brazil	2:13.1	
5	Rita Femia	Argentina	2:20.4	
6	Laura Oyhanctábal	Uruguay	2:23.6	
7	Sonia Galdós	Peru	2:29.2	

=== 1500 metres ===
28 August

Rank	Name	Nationality	Time	Notes
1st place, gold medalist(s)	Ana María Nielsen	Argentina	4:27.0	CR
2nd place, silver medalist(s)	Iris Fernández	Argentina	4:31.9	PB
3rd place, bronze medalist(s)	Mara Führmann	Brazil	4:34.7	
4	Rosa de Souza	Brazil	4:42.5	
5	Magdalena Caizabanda	Ecuador	4:55.0	
6	Sonia Galdós	Peru	5:07.5	

=== 100 metres hurdles ===
27 August

Rank	Name	Nationality	Time	Notes
1st place, gold medalist(s)	Maria Luísa Betioli	Brazil	14.3	
2nd place, silver medalist(s)	Emilia Dyrzka	Argentina	14.6	
3rd place, bronze medalist(s)	Viviane Nouailhetas	Brazil	14.7	
4	Simone Krauthausen	Peru	14.9	
5	Ana María Desevici	Uruguay	15.4	
6	Yvonne Neddermann	Argentina	15.5	
7	Adriana Caruggi	Peru	15.9	

=== 4 × 100 metres relay ===
31 August

Rank	Nation	Competitors	Time	Notes
1st place, gold medalist(s)	Argentina	Belkis Fava, Angela Godoy, Liliana Cragno, Beatriz Allocco	45.9	CR
2nd place, silver medalist(s)	Brazil	Maria Amorim, Nivea Pacifico, Elisabeth Nunes, Silvina Pereira	45.9	
3rd place, bronze medalist(s)	Peru	Adriana Caruggi, Beatriz Pacheco, Carmela Bolivár, Simone Krauthausen	48.5	

=== 4 × 400 metres relay ===
27 August

Rank	Nation	Competitors	Time	Notes
1st place, gold medalist(s)	Brazil	Maria da Silva, Rosângela Verissimo, Valdéa Chagas, Miriam da Silva	3:43.8	CR
2nd place, silver medalist(s)	Argentina	Angela Godoy, Rita Femia, Adriana Britos, Graciela Ghelfi	3:52.6	
3rd place, bronze medalist(s)	Uruguay	Alicia Vicent, Laura Oyhantocábal, Josefa Vicent, Margarita Grun	3:56.4	

=== High jump ===
27 August

Rank	Name	Nationality	Result	Notes
1st place, gold medalist(s)	Maria Luísa Betioli	Brazil	1.75	=CR
2nd place, silver medalist(s)	Jurema da Silva	Brazil	1.68	
3rd place, bronze medalist(s)	Rosemarie Boeck	Peru	1.62	
4	Mónica Rodríguez	Argentina	1.62	
5	Ulrike Heberlein	Chile	1.62	
6	Laura Ragas	Argentina	1.62	
7	Ana María Desevici	Uruguay	1.59	

=== Long jump ===
29 August

Rank	Name	Nationality	Result	Notes
1st place, gold medalist(s)	Silvina Pereira	Brazil	6.11	CR
2nd place, silver medalist(s)	Marlene Nascimento	Brazil	5.84	
3rd place, bronze medalist(s)	Yvonne Neddermann	Argentina	5.77	
4	Ana María Desevici	Uruguay	5.74	
5	Beatriz Pacheco	Peru	5.59	
6	Liliana Cragno	Argentina	5.37	

=== Shot put ===
29 August

Rank	Name	Nationality	Result	Notes
1st place, gold medalist(s)	Maria Boso	Brazil	14.05	
2nd place, silver medalist(s)	Rosa Molina	Chile	13.52	
3rd place, bronze medalist(s)	Verônika Brunner	Brazil	13.33	
4	Ramona Brizuela	Argentina	12.35	
5	María Elena Rojas	Chile	12.33	
6	Gladys Ortega	Argentina	11.32	
7	Alicia Vicent	Uruguay	10.22	

=== Discus throw ===
26 August

Rank	Name	Nationality	Result	Notes
1st place, gold medalist(s)	Odete Domingos	Brazil	50.78	AR
2nd place, silver medalist(s)	Maria Boso	Brazil	45.18	
3rd place, bronze medalist(s)	Gladys Ortega	Argentina	42.24	
4	Ramona Brizuela	Argentina	36.48	

=== Javelin throw ===
27 August – Old model

Rank	Name	Nationality	Result	Notes
1st place, gold medalist(s)	Mariela Zapata	Colombia	43.72	
2nd place, silver medalist(s)	Bárbara dos Santos	Brazil	41.10	
3rd place, bronze medalist(s)	María Elena Rojas	Chile	40.68	
4	Verónica Díaz	Chile	39.70	
5	Olga Verissimo	Brazil	38.24	
6	Susana Sánchez	Argentina	37.88	
7	Ramona Brizuela	Argentina	35.64	

=== Pentathlon ===
30–31 August

The highest mark recorded in each event is highlighted in yellow

Rank	Athlete	Nationality	100m H	SP	HJ	LJ	200m	Points	Notes
1st place, gold medalist(s)	Conceição Geremias	Brazil	15.4	11.69	1.64	5.69	25.7	3904	
2nd place, silver medalist(s)	Themis Zambrzycki	Brazil	15.5	11.53	1.64	5.42	26.1	3790	
3rd place, bronze medalist(s)	Emilia Dyrzka	Argentina	14.5	11.36	1.50	5.32	26.2	3708	
4	Ana María Desevici	Uruguay	15.0	9.31	1.55	5.53	26.1	3626	
5	Yvonne Neddermann	Argentina	15.3	10.81	1.47	5.55	26.0	3619	
	Rosemarie Boeck	Peru	15.8	10.53	1.58	?	DNS	DNF	
