= Athletics at the 1979 Pan American Games – Women's long jump =

Women's long jump at the 1979 Pan American Games
- Venue: Estadio Sixto Escobar
- Dates: 8 July
- Winning distance: 6.46

Medalists
Gold medal	Kathy McMillan	United States
Silver medal	Ana Alexander	Cuba
Bronze medal	Eloína Echevarría	Cuba

The women's long jump competition of the athletics events at the 1979 Pan American Games took place on 8 July at the Estadio Sixto Escobar. The defending Pan American Games champion was Ana Alexander of Cuba.

== Records ==
Prior to this competition, the existing world and Pan American Games records were as follows:

World record	Vilma Bardauskienė (URS)	7.09	Prague, Czechoslovakia	August 29, 1978
Pan American Games record	Ana Alexander (CUB)	6.63	Mexico City, Mexico	1975

== Results ==
All distances shown are in meters.

KEY:	WR	World Record	GR	Pan American Record

=== Final ===
Rank	Name	Nationality	Distance	Notes
1st place, gold medalist(s)	Kathy McMillan	United States	6.46	
2nd place, silver medalist(s)	Ana Alexander	Cuba	6.31	
3rd place, bronze medalist(s)	Eloína Echevarría	Cuba	6.27	
4	Diane Jones-Konihowski	Canada	6.10	
5	Jane Frederick	United States	6.10	
6	Shonel Ferguson	Bahamas	6.07	
7	Madeline de Jesús	Puerto Rico	5.88	
8	Jillian Ross	Canada	5.85	
9	Jennifer Innis	Guyana	5.56	
10	Yvonne Neddermann	Argentina	5.54	
11	Nancy Vallecilla	Ecuador	5.29	
	Themis Zambrzycki	Brazil	DNS	
	Sharol Henry	Jamaica	DNS	
	Dorothy Scott	Jamaica	DNS	
	Sorelli Bohorquez	Venezuela	DNS	
