= 1977 South American Championships in Athletics – Results =

These are the results of the 1977 South American Championships in Athletics which took place at the Pista del Parque Batlle y Ordoñez (today Pista de Atletismo Darwin Piñeyrúa) in Montevideo, Uruguay, on 4, 5 and 6 November.

== Men's results ==
=== 100 metres ===
Heats – 4 November

Rank	Heat	Name	Nationality	Time	Notes
1	2	Rui da Silva	Brazil	10.51	Q
2	2	Miguel Sulbarán	Venezuela	10.63	Q
3	1	Katsuhiko Nakaya	Brazil	10.65	Q
4	1	José Chacín	Venezuela	10.67	Q
5	2	José Gonçalves	Uruguay	10.82	Q
6	2	Luis Alberto Schneider	Chile	10.83	Q
7	2	Ricardo Donda	Argentina	10.88	
8	1	Gustavo Dubarbier	Argentina	11.00	Q
9	2	Edgar Biojó	Colombia	11.06	
10	1	Luis Sánchez	Uruguay	11.15	Q
11	2	Ángel Guerrero	Paraguay	11.16	
12	1	Onías Palacios	Colombia	11.26	
13	1	Rafael Edwards	Chile	11.29	

Final – 5 November
Wind: +1.5 m/s

Rank	Name	Nationality	Time	Notes
1st place, gold medalist(s)	Rui da Silva	Brazil	10.3	
2nd place, silver medalist(s)	Katsuhiko Nakaya	Brazil	10.4	
3rd place, bronze medalist(s)	Miguel Sulbarán	Venezuela	10.6	
4	José Chacín	Venezuela	10.8	
5	José Gonçalves	Uruguay	10.9	
6	Luis Alberto Schneider	Chile	11.0	
7	Gustavo Dubarbier	Argentina	11.0	
8	Luis Sánchez	Uruguay	11.2	

=== 200 metres ===
Heats – 6 November
Wind:
Heat 1: 0.0 m/s, Heat 2: -1.0 m/s

Rank	Heat	Name	Nationality	Time	Notes
1	1	Rui da Silva	Brazil	22.2	Q
2	1	José Chacín	Venezuela	22.5	Q
3	1	Gustavo Dubarbier	Argentina	22.6	Q
4	1	Rafael Rossi	Chile	22.6	
5	1	Luis Sánchez	Uruguay	23.0	
6	1	Onías Palacios	Colombia	23.2	
1	2	Hipólito Brown	Venezuela	22.1	Q
2	2	Katsuhiko Nakaya	Brazil	22.2	Q
3	2	José Gonçalves	Uruguay	22.6	Q
4	2	Edgar Biojó	Colombia	23.1	
5	2	Ángel Guerrero	Paraguay	23.2	

Final – 6 November

Wind: 0.0 m/s

Rank	Name	Nationality	Time	Notes
1st place, gold medalist(s)	Rui da Silva	Brazil	21.3	
2nd place, silver medalist(s)	Katsuhiko Nakaya	Brazil	21.7	
3rd place, bronze medalist(s)	Hipólito Brown	Venezuela	22.1	
4	José Gonçalves	Uruguay	22.2	
5	José Chacín	Venezuela	22.3	
6	Gustavo Dubarbier	Argentina	22.4	

=== 400 metres ===
Heats – 4 November

Rank	Heat	Name	Nationality	Time	Notes
1	1	Delmo da Silva	Brazil	49.0	Q
2	1	Alexis Herrera	Venezuela	49.5	Q
3	1	Eduardo Sandes	Argentina	49.9	
	1	Julio Acosta	Colombia	DQ	
1	2	Djalma de Oliveira	Brazil	49.2	Q
2	2	Ariel Santolaya	Chile	49.7	Q
3	2	Ricardo Vigo	Argentina	50.0	
4	2	Héctor Olivera	Uruguay	52.0	
1	3	Hipólito Brown	Venezuela	49.3	Q
2	3	Almir da Cunha	Uruguay	51.4	Q
	3	Gabriel Lopera	Colombia	DQ	

Final – 5 November

Rank	Name	Nationality	Time	Notes
1st place, gold medalist(s)	Delmo da Silva	Brazil	47.70	
2nd place, silver medalist(s)	Ariel Santolaya	Chile	47.71	
3rd place, bronze medalist(s)	Djalma de Oliveira	Brazil	48.24	
4	Hipólito Brown	Venezuela	48.36	
5	Alexis Herrera	Venezuela	48.64	
6	Almir da Cunha	Uruguay	53.64	

=== 800 metres ===
Heats – 6 November

Rank	Heat	Name	Nationality	Time	Notes
1	1	Agberto Guimarães	Brazil	1:56.7	Q
2	1	Omar Amdematten	Argentina	1:56.9	Q
3	1	Edgar Gómez	Colombia	1:57.4	
4	1	Miguel Velázquez	Venezuela	1:57.5	
5	1	Ramón Silva	Paraguay	2:04.4	
1	2	Ricardo Vigo	Argentina	1:57.5	Q
2	2	Wilson dos Santos	Brazil	1:57.7	Q
3	2	Eduardo Valenzuela	Chile	1:57.7	
4	2	Héctor Olivera	Uruguay	1:59.9	
5	2	Felipe Neri	Paraguay	2:00.1	
1	3	Cristián Molina	Chile	1:57.7	Q
2	3	William Wuycke	Venezuela	1:57.7	Q
3	3	Hugo Villegas	Colombia	1:59.3	
4	3	Juan Lazarte	Uruguay	2:00.9	
5	3	Pedro Foronda	Bolivia	2:01.2	

Final – 6 November

Rank	Name	Nationality	Time	Notes
1st place, gold medalist(s)	Agberto Guimarães	Brazil	1:52.4	
2nd place, silver medalist(s)	Omar Amdematten	Argentina	1:52.8	
3rd place, bronze medalist(s)	Ricardo Vigo	Argentina	1:53.4	
4	Cristián Molina	Chile	1:54.4	
5	William Wuycke	Venezuela	1:56.4	
6	Wilson dos Santos	Brazil	2:00.5	

=== 1500 metres ===
5 November

Rank	Name	Nationality	Time	Notes
1st place, gold medalist(s)	José González	Venezuela	3:51.7	
2nd place, silver medalist(s)	Emilio Ulloa	Chile	3:51.7	
3rd place, bronze medalist(s)	Cosme do Nascimento	Brazil	3:51.7	
4	Abel Godoy	Uruguay	3:53.1	
5	Jairo Cubillos	Colombia	3:55.8	
6	Omar Amdematten	Argentina	3:57.7	
7	Osmán Escobar	Venezuela	3:58.1	
8	Alberto Lopes	Brazil	3:59.3	
9	Félix Riverdieu	Uruguay	3:59.7	

=== 5000 metres ===
5 November

Rank	Name	Nationality	Time	Notes
1st place, gold medalist(s)	Domingo Tibaduiza	Colombia	14:24.4	
2nd place, silver medalist(s)	Darcy Pereira	Brazil	14:25.4	
3rd place, bronze medalist(s)	Jairo Correa	Colombia	14:26.0	
4	Carlos Alves	Brazil	14:33.4	
5	Lucirio Garrido	Venezuela	14:35.0	
6	Juan Adolfo Carrizo	Argentina	14:55.8	
7	Luis Rudas	Venezuela	14:56.7	
8	Norberto Limonta	Argentina	14:57.6	
9	Óscar Carrión	Uruguay	15:05.6	
10	Alejandro Silva	Chile	15:15.1	
11	Enrique Dihi	Uruguay	16:04.4	

=== 10,000 metres ===
4 November

Rank	Name	Nationality	Time	Notes
1st place, gold medalist(s)	Domingo Tibaduiza	Colombia	29:44.2	
2nd place, silver medalist(s)	Aloisio de Araújo	Brazil	29:57.0	
3rd place, bronze medalist(s)	Carlos Alves	Brazil	30:12.3	
4	Juan Adolfo Carrizo	Argentina	30:23.9	
5	Luis Rudas	Venezuela	31:10.4	
6	Héctor Rodríguez	Colombia	31:17.4	
7	Alejandro Silva	Chile	31:47.9	
8	Héctor Robatti	Uruguay	32:07.0	

=== Marathon ===
6 November

Rank	Name	Nationality	Time	Notes
1st place, gold medalist(s)	Héctor Rodríguez	Colombia	2:19:56	
2nd place, silver medalist(s)	Víctor Rodríguez	Colombia	2:24:48	
3rd place, bronze medalist(s)	Elói Schleder	Brazil	2:26:48	
4	Osvaldo Cornejo	Chile	2:31:14	
5	José Ramírez	Chile	2:34:06	
6	Efraín Manquel	Argentina	2:36:16	
7	Eusebio Cardoso	Paraguay	2:47:34	
8	Domingo Moreira	Uruguay	2:49:12	
9	Marcial Congo	Paraguay	3:08:27	

=== 110 metres hurdles ===
Heats – 4 November
Wind:
Heat 1: -0.3 m/s, Heat 2: -0.8 m/s

Rank	Heat	Name	Nationality	Time	Notes
1	1	Jesús Villegas	Colombia	14.8	Q
2	1	Carlos dos Santos	Brazil	15.0	Q
3	1	Rodolfo Iturraspe	Argentina	15.1	Q
4	1	Hans Miethe	Chile	15.7	Q
1	2	Óscar Marín	Venezuela	15.6	Q
2	2	Tito Steiner	Argentina	16.0	Q
3	2	Francisco Fuentes	Chile	16.4	Q

Final – 5 November

Wind: 0.0 m/s

Rank	Name	Nationality	Time	Notes
1st place, gold medalist(s)	Óscar Marín	Venezuela	14.97	
2nd place, silver medalist(s)	Jesús Villegas	Colombia	15.04	
3rd place, bronze medalist(s)	Carlos dos Santos	Brazil	15.23	
4	Hans Miethe	Chile	15.71	
5	Rodolfo Iturraspe	Argentina	15.80	
6	Francisco Fuentes	Chile	15.95	
	Tito Steiner	Argentina	?	

=== 400 metres hurdles ===
Heats – 5 November

Rank	Heat	Name	Nationality	Time	Notes
1	1	Moisés Zambrano	Venezuela	55.4	Q
2	1	Francisco Rojas	Paraguay	56.1	Q
3	1	Joelmerson de Carvalho	Brazil	56.1	Q
4	1	Alfredo Velasco	Chile	56.6	
5	1	Harry Franco	Uruguay	57.8	
1	2	Donizete Soares	Brazil	54.5	Q
2	2	Fabio Zúñiga	Colombia	54.7	Q
3	2	Ariel Santolaya	Chile	54.7	Q
4	2	Jorge Gómez	Venezuela	54.7	
5	2	Rodolfo Iturraspe	Argentina	55.6	
6	2	Sergio Collis	Uruguay	1:06.5	

Final – 6 November

Rank	Name	Nationality	Time	Notes
1st place, gold medalist(s)	Moisés Zambrano	Venezuela	53.7	
2nd place, silver medalist(s)	Donizete Soares	Brazil	54.1	
3rd place, bronze medalist(s)	Joelmerson de Carvalho	Brazil	54.4	
4	Fabio Zúñiga	Colombia	54.8	
5	Ariel Santolaya	Chile	55.3	
6	Francisco Rojas	Paraguay	57.1	

=== 3000 metres steeplechase ===
4 November

Rank	Name	Nationality	Time	Notes
1st place, gold medalist(s)	Jairo Correa	Colombia	9:00.5	
2nd place, silver medalist(s)	Lucirio Garrido	Venezuela	9:01.5	
3rd place, bronze medalist(s)	Abel Córdoba	Argentina	9:13.0	
4	Víctor Rodríguez	Colombia	9:15.6	
5	Emilio Ulloa	Chile	9:27.0	
6	Gérson Monteiro	Brazil	9:29.8	
7	Antônio Ranzani	Brazil	9:37.8	
8	Víctor Gil	Venezuela	9:37.8	
	Norberto Limonta	Argentina	DNF	

=== 4 × 100 metres relay ===
Heats – 5 November

Rank	Heat	Nation	Competitors	Time	Notes
1	2	Venezuela		41.36	Q
2	1	Brazil		42.73	Q
3	2	Uruguay		43.08	Q
4	1	Colombia		43.10	Q
5	1	Chile		43.11	Q
6	1	Paraguay		43.79	q
	2	Argentina		DNF	

Final – 5 November

Rank	Nation	Competitors	Time	Notes
1st place, gold medalist(s)	Brazil	Antônio Carlos dos Santos, Nelson dos Santos, Rui da Silva, Katsuhiko Nakaya	41.4	
2nd place, silver medalist(s)	Venezuela	José Chacín, Manuel Briceño, Ely Zabala, Hipólito Brown	41.7	
3rd place, bronze medalist(s)	Uruguay	Servio Labruna, Luis Sánchez, Luis Barbosa, José Gonçalves	42.1	
4	Colombia	Onías Palacios, Julio Acosta, Edgar Biojó, Jesús Villegas	43.0	
5	Paraguay	Ángel Guerrero, Francisco Rojas, Adolfo Marín, Hugo Martínez	43.4	
	Chile		?	

=== 4 × 400 metres relay ===
Heats – 6 November

Rank	Heat	Nation	Competitors	Time	Notes
1	1	Brazil		3:22.6	Q
2	1	Chile		3:24.2	Q
3	1	Colombia		3:24.4	Q
1	2	Venezuela		3:23.9	Q
2	2	Argentina		3:25.3	Q
3	2	Uruguay		3:27.2	Q
4	2	Paraguay		3:35.9	

Final – 6 November

Rank	Nation	Competitors	Time	Notes
1st place, gold medalist(s)	Brazil	Djalma de Oliveira, Delmo da Silva, Pedro Teixeira, Donizete Soares	3:15.1	
2nd place, silver medalist(s)	Venezuela	Hipólito Brown, E. López, Alexis Herrera, Moisés Zambrano	3:17.4	
3rd place, bronze medalist(s)	Chile	Ariel Santolaya, Cristián Molina, Emilio Ulloa, Alfredo Edwards	3:23.1	
4	Colombia	Gabriel Lopera, Onías Palacios, Fabio Zúñiga, Julio Acosta	3:23.5	
5	Argentina	Rodolfo Iturraspe, Juan José Rodríguez, Angel Gagliano, Eduardo Sandes	3:24.2	
6	Uruguay	Héctor Olivera, Gancio, Almir da Cunha, Sosa	3:32.9	

=== 20 kilometres walk ===
5 November

Rank	Name	Nationality	Time	Notes
1st place, gold medalist(s)	Enrique Peña	Colombia	1:37:21	CR
2nd place, silver medalist(s)	Osvaldo Morejón	Bolivia	1:39:23	
3rd place, bronze medalist(s)	Rafael Vega	Colombia	1:40:14	
4	Rito Molina	Argentina	1:45:44	
5	José Rodríguez	Argentina	1:46:19	
6	Waldemar da Silva	Brazil	1:51:37	
7	Ricardo Nuske	Brazil	1:53:34	
8	Estebán Quelele	Bolivia	1:53:34	
9	Antonio Moraga	Chile	2:01:18	

=== High jump ===
6 November

Rank	Name	Nationality	Result	Notes
1st place, gold medalist(s)	Irajá Cecy	Brazil	2.05	
2nd place, silver medalist(s)	Luis Arbulú	Peru	2.00	
3rd place, bronze medalist(s)	Luis Barrionuevo	Argentina	2.00	
4	Javier Olivar	Uruguay	1.85	
5	Rubén Osorio	Paraguay	1.75	
6	Carlos Guillén	Bolivia	1.70	

=== Pole vault ===
4 November

Rank	Name	Nationality	Result	Notes
1st place, gold medalist(s)	Renato Bortolocci	Brazil	4.40	
2nd place, silver medalist(s)	Tito Steiner	Argentina	4.30	
3rd place, bronze medalist(s)	Fernando Hoces	Chile	4.10	
4	Guillermo Chiaraviglio	Argentina	4.10	
5	Darío Castagnino	Paraguay	4.00	
6	Claudio Escauriza	Paraguay	3.60	
	Fernando Ruocco	Uruguay	NM	

=== Long jump ===
6 November

Rank	Name	Nationality	Result	Notes
1st place, gold medalist(s)	João Carlos de Oliveira	Brazil	7.95	CR
2nd place, silver medalist(s)	Hugo Meriano	Argentina	7.31	
3rd place, bronze medalist(s)	Ronald Raborg	Peru	7.22	
4	João Carlos dos Santos	Brazil	7.12	
5	Eduardo Labalta	Argentina	7.07	
6	Francisco Pichott	Chile	6.92	
7	Luis Alberto Schneider	Chile	6.77	
8	Jorge do Prado	Uruguay	6.70	

=== Triple jump ===
5 November

Rank	Name	Nationality	#1	#2	#3	#4	#5	#6	Result	Notes
1st place, gold medalist(s)	João Carlos de Oliveira	Brazil	16.40	x	15.86	–	–	–	16.40	
2nd place, silver medalist(s)	Angel Gagliano	Argentina							15.15	
3rd place, bronze medalist(s)	Francisco Pichott	Chile							14.87	
4	Emilio Mazzeo	Argentina							14.86	
5	João Carlos dos Santos	Brazil							14.09	
6	José Gregorio Salazar	Venezuela							13.70	
7	José Sosa	Paraguay							13.50	

=== Shot put ===
6 November

Rank	Name	Nationality	Result	Notes
1st place, gold medalist(s)	José Luiz Carabolante	Brazil	15.83	
2nd place, silver medalist(s)	José Carreño	Venezuela	15.70	
3rd place, bronze medalist(s)	José Carlos Jacques	Brazil	15.62	
4	Jesús Ramos	Venezuela	15.46	
5	Modesto Barreto	Colombia	14.90	
6	Néstor Sánchez	Argentina	14.69	
7	Óscar Gadea	Uruguay	14.18	
8	José Jara	Chile	14.17	
9	Héctor Rivero	Argentina	13.44	
10	Omar González	Uruguay	12.98	
11	Víctor Martínez	Paraguay	12.42	

=== Discus throw ===
4 November

Rank	Name	Nationality	Result	Notes
1st place, gold medalist(s)	Sérgio Thomé	Brazil	52.24	
2nd place, silver medalist(s)	Modesto Barreto	Colombia	50.64	
3rd place, bronze medalist(s)	José Carlos Jacques	Brazil	46.42	
4	Héctor Rivero	Argentina	46.22	
5	Ramón Montezuma	Venezuela	45.10	
6	José Carreño	Venezuela	43.56	
7	Óscar Gadea	Uruguay	40.90	
8	José Alberto Vallejo	Argentina	40.48	

=== Hammer throw ===
6 November

Rank	Name	Nationality	Result	Notes
1st place, gold medalist(s)	Daniel Gómez	Argentina	64.66	CR
2nd place, silver medalist(s)	Celso de Moraes	Brazil	63.52	
3rd place, bronze medalist(s)	Ivam Bertelli	Brazil	63.40	
4	José Alberto Vallejo	Argentina	63.22	
5	Pelayo Quintana	Venezuela	50.84	
6	Edgar Yarce	Colombia	50.48	
7	Humberto Cáceres	Chile	49.32	

=== Javelin throw ===
5 November – Old model

Rank	Name	Nationality	Result	Notes
1st place, gold medalist(s)	Mario Sotomayor	Colombia	66.96	
2nd place, silver medalist(s)	Paulo de Faría	Brazil	66.50	
3rd place, bronze medalist(s)	Angel Garmendia	Argentina	65.72	
4	Orangel Rodríguez	Venezuela	63.68	
5	Claudio Escauriza	Paraguay	60.44	
6	Hugo Balsani	Uruguay	57.68	
7	Humberto Vianna	Brazil	56.08	
8	Horst Klotzer	Chile	55.54	

=== Decathlon ===
5–6 November – 1962 tables (1985 conversions given with *)

The highest mark recorded in each event is highlighted in yellow

Rank	Athlete	Nationality	100m	LJ	SP	HJ	400m	110m H	DT	PV	JT	1500m	Points	Conv.	Notes
1st place, gold medalist(s)	Tito Steiner	Argentina	11.6	6.78	14.28	1.83	51.2	15.5	44.54	4.50	56.16	4:35.7	7411	7264*	
2nd place, silver medalist(s)	Renato Bortolocci	Brazil	11.2	6.67	11.82	1.97	51.9	16.4	37.22	4.50	52.98	4:47.2	7076	6894*	
3rd place, bronze medalist(s)	Ángel Montezuma	Venezuela	11.3	6.25	12.40	1.80	50.5	16.2	43.64	3.80	53.94	4:33.3	6976	6783*	
4	Alfredo Silva	Chile	11.3	6.29	11.98	1.90	51.4	16.2	35.14	3.40	45.88	4:47.1	6529	6329*	
5	Eduardo Sotomayor	Chile	11.6	6.64	10.61	1.83	52.4	16.4	33.34	3.40	42.16	4:47.5	6230	6045*	
6	Juan Ríos	Venezuela	11.1	6.08	11.06	1.75	55.1	17.6	35.38	3.40	52.80	4:45.7	6114	5956*	
7	Jorge da Silva	Brazil	11.3	5.95	11.58	1.80	54.7	16.2	33.54	3.20	49.06	5:07.2	6049	5852*	
8	Claudio Escauriza	Paraguay	11.8	6.14	11.17	1.60	56.1	18.6	33.42	3.70	51.18	5:13.9	5658	5431*	
	Alfredo Rossi	Uruguay	12.7	5.50	11.11	1.65	62.4	19.4	40.24	3.40	42.94	DNS	DNF	–	
	Rodolfo Díaz	Uruguay	12.2	5.49	10.65	NM	61.1	DNF	DNS	–	–	–	DNF	–	

== Women's results ==
=== 100 metres ===
Heats – 4 November
Wind:
Heat 1: -0.5 m/s, Heat 2: ?

Rank	Heat	Name	Nationality	Time	Notes
1	1	Beatriz Allocco	Argentina	11.73	Q
2	1	Flavia Villar	Chile	12.00	Q
3	1	Carmela Bolívar	Peru	12.02	Q
4	1	Rocío Rebollo	Uruguay	12.10	Q
5	2	Beatriz Capotosto	Argentina	12.10	Q
6	1	Marta Meléndez	Colombia	12.20	
7	2	Bárbara do Nascimento	Brazil	12.24	Q
8	2	Carla Herencia	Chile	12.30	Q
9	1	Maria Levien	Brazil	12.40	
10	2	Margarita Grun	Uruguay	12.43	Q
11	2	Elsa Antúnez	Venezuela	12.45	
12	1	Isabel Aleman	Bolivia	12.50	
13	2	Cecilia Echeverry	Colombia	12.60	
14	2	María Roldán	Paraguay	12.92	

Final – 5 November

Wind: +0.5 m/s

Rank	Name	Nationality	Time	Notes
1st place, gold medalist(s)	Beatriz Allocco	Argentina	11.97	
2nd place, silver medalist(s)	Beatriz Capotosto	Argentina	12.20	
3rd place, bronze medalist(s)	Carmela Bolívar	Peru	12.27	
3rd place, bronze medalist(s)	Carla Herencia	Chile	12.27	
5	Flavia Villar	Chile	12.32	
6	Rocío Rebollo	Uruguay	12.46	
7	Bárbara do Nascimento	Brazil	12.49	
8	Margarita Grun	Uruguay	12.62	

=== 200 metres ===
Heats – 6 November
Wind:
Heat 1: 0.0 m/s, Heat 2: +0.8 m/s, Heat 3: -0.2 m/s

Rank	Heat	Name	Nationality	Time	Notes
1	1	Beatriz Allocco	Argentina	24.9	Q
2	1	Sueli Machado	Brazil	25.3	Q
3	1	Elsa Antúnez	Venezuela	25.8	
4	1	Carmela Bolívar	Peru	26.3	
5	1	María Rolón	Paraguay	27.2	
1	2	Carla Herencia	Chile	25.4	Q
2	2	Margarita Grun	Uruguay	25.5	Q
3	2	Maria Luísa Betioli	Brazil	26.2	
4	2	Patricia Morales	Colombia	27.2	
1	3	Flavia Villar	Chile	25.3	Q
2	3	Beatriz Capotosto	Argentina	25.5	Q
3	3	Marta Meléndez	Colombia	25.8	
4	3	Alicia Vicent	Uruguay	26.0	

Final – 6 November

Wind: ?

Rank	Name	Nationality	Time	Notes
1st place, gold medalist(s)	Beatriz Allocco	Argentina	24.7	
2nd place, silver medalist(s)	Sueli Machado	Brazil	25.2	
3rd place, bronze medalist(s)	Flavia Villar	Chile	25.3	
4	Carla Herencia	Chile	25.5	
5	Margarita Grun	Uruguay	25.6	
6	Beatriz Capotosto	Argentina	25.6	

=== 400 metres ===
Heats – 4 November

Rank	Heat	Name	Nationality	Time	Notes
1	1	Eucaris Caicedo	Colombia	59.2	Q
2	1	Adriana Marchena	Venezuela	59.4	Q
2	1	Juana Rossano	Paraguay	1:04.7	
1	2	Inoilde Cruz	Brazil	57.4	Q
2	2	Margarita Grun	Uruguay	58.2	Q
3	2	Janeth Carvajal	Venezuela	59.5	
4	2	Silvia Augsburger	Argentina	1:01.0	
1	3	Marcela López	Argentina	57.5	Q
2	3	Cecilia Rodríguez	Chile	57.8	Q
3	3	Tânia Miranda	Brazil	58.5	
4	3	Verónica Arrionda	Uruguay	59.8	
5	3	Blanca Ibáñez	Bolivia	1:01.2	

Final – 5 November

Rank	Name	Nationality	Time	Notes
1st place, gold medalist(s)	Eucaris Caicedo	Colombia	55.30	
2nd place, silver medalist(s)	Adriana Marchena	Venezuela	56.48	
3rd place, bronze medalist(s)	Marcela López	Argentina	56.69	
4	Cecilia Rodríguez	Chile	57.31	
5	Inoilde Cruz	Brazil	58.41	
6	Margarita Grun	Uruguay	59.51	

=== 800 metres ===
Heats – 5 November

Rank	Heat	Name	Nationality	Time	Notes
1	1	Alejandra Ramos	Chile	2:20.7	Q
2	1	Aparecida Adão	Brazil	2:22.4	Q
3	1	Nubia Medina	Colombia	2:23.3	
4	1	Lucy Fernández	Uruguay	2:23.3	
5	1	Mirta Ezcurra	Paraguay	2:27.2	
1	2	Adriana Marchena	Venezuela	2:14.8	Q
2	2	Graciela Escalada	Argentina	2:15.4	Q
3	2	Joyce dos Santos	Brazil	2:21.4	
4	2	Sara Vicenti	Bolivia	2:27.6	
1	3	Laura Oyanctábal	Uruguay	2:21.5	Q
2	3	Mery Rojas	Bolivia	2:22.1	Q
3	3	Genoveva Caro	Chile	2:23.0	
4	3	Nilda Blanco	Paraguay	2:28.4	

Final – 6 November

Rank	Name	Nationality	Time	Notes
1st place, gold medalist(s)	Alejandra Ramos	Chile	2:12.3	
2nd place, silver medalist(s)	Adriana Marchena	Venezuela	2:15.8	
3rd place, bronze medalist(s)	Aparecida Adão	Brazil	2:15.8	
4	Graciela Escalada	Argentina	2:17.7	
5	Laura Oyanctábal	Uruguay	2:22.0	
	Mery Rojas	Bolivia	?	

=== 1500 metres ===
4 November

Rank	Name	Nationality	Time	Notes
1st place, gold medalist(s)	Alejandra Ramos	Chile	4:39.8	
2nd place, silver medalist(s)	Maria Dias	Brazil	4:46.8	
3rd place, bronze medalist(s)	Mery Rojas	Bolivia	4:46.8	
4	Olga Caccaviello	Argentina	4:47.6	
5	Aparecida Adão	Brazil	4:49.3	
6	Genoveva Caro	Chile	4:51.5	
7	Nubia Medina	Colombia	4:54.0	
8	Laura Martiarena	Uruguay	4:58.5	

=== 100 metres hurdles ===
5 November
Wind: -0.5 m/s

Rank	Name	Nationality	Time	Notes
1st place, gold medalist(s)	Edith Noeding	Peru	14.47	
2nd place, silver medalist(s)	Themis Zambrzycki	Brazil	14.76	
3rd place, bronze medalist(s)	Maria Luísa Betioli	Brazil	14.80	
4	Gloria Barturen	Chile	15.14	
5	Yvonne Neddermann	Argentina	15.59	

=== 4 × 100 metres relay ===
Heats – 5 November

Rank	Heat	Nation	Competitors	Time	Notes
1	2	Chile		47.92	Q
2	2	Brazil		48.01	Q
3	1	Argentina		48.19	Q
4	2	Uruguay		48.20	Q
5	1	Colombia		48.91	Q
6	1	Venezuela		49.31	Q
7	2	Bolivia		51.0	

Final – 5 November

Rank	Nation	Competitors	Time	Notes
1st place, gold medalist(s)	Argentina	Araceli Bruschini, Susana Perizzotti, Beatriz Capotosto, Beatriz Allocco	46.7	
2nd place, silver medalist(s)	Chile	Flavia Villar, Carla Herencia, Verónica Kinzer, Pía Ábalos	47.8	
3rd place, bronze medalist(s)	Brazil	Maria Levien, Sueli Machado, Conceição Geremias, Bárbara do Nascimento	47.8	
4	Uruguay	Rocío Rebollo, Margarita Grun, Alicia Vicent, Verónica Arrionda	47.9	
5	Venezuela	Elsa Antúnez, Lourdes Nicola, Adriana Marchena, Arelis Pulvet	48.5	
6	Colombia	Cecilia Echeverry, Marta Meléndez, Eucaris Caicedo, Patricia Morales	48.6	

=== 4 × 400 metres relay ===
Heats – 6 November

Rank	Heat	Nation	Competitors	Time	Notes
1	1	Venezuela		4:03.0	Q
2	1	Uruguay		4:05.0	Q
3	1	Argentina		4:08.2	Q
1	2	Brazil		4:03.9	Q
2	2	Colombia		4:09.7	Q
3	2	Chile		4:03.8	Q
4	2	Paraguay		4:26.9	

Final – 6 November

Rank	Nation	Competitors	Time	Notes
1st place, gold medalist(s)	Brazil	Tânia Miranda, Sueli Machado, Joyce Felipe dos Santos, Inoilde Cruz	3:49.7	
2nd place, silver medalist(s)	Argentina	Graciela Escalada, Beatriz Allocco, Marcela López, Silvia Augsburger	3:53.4	
3rd place, bronze medalist(s)	Venezuela	Elsa Antúnez, Lourdes Nicola, Adriana Marchena, Yaneth Carvajal	3:55.2	
4	Chile	Flavia Villar, Alejandra Ramos, María Eugenia Guzmán, Cecilia Rodríguez	3:55.9	
5	Colombia	Eucaris Caicedo, Marta Meléndez, Cecilia Echeverry, Patricia Morales	4:00.6	
6	Uruguay	Lucy Fernández, Verónica Arrionda, Laura Oyanctábal, Margarita Grun	4:03.6	

=== High jump ===
5 November

Rank	Name	Nationality	Result	Notes
1st place, gold medalist(s)	Maria Luísa Betioli	Brazil	1.80	CR
2nd place, silver medalist(s)	Beatriz Dias	Brazil	1.70	
3rd place, bronze medalist(s)	Beatriz Arancibia	Chile	1.60	
4	Elizabeth Huber	Chile	1.55	
4	Ana Rojas	Venezuela	1.55	
6	María Bico	Uruguay	1.50	
7	Graciela Acosta	Uruguay	1.45	

=== Long jump ===
6 November

Rank	Name	Nationality	Result	Notes
1st place, gold medalist(s)	Yvonne Neddermann	Argentina	5.65	
2nd place, silver medalist(s)	Themis Zambrzycki	Brazil	5.49	
3rd place, bronze medalist(s)	Conceição Geremias	Brazil	5.49	
4	Evelyn Jabiles	Peru	5.44	
5	Margot Mundin	Uruguay	5.32	
6	Gloria Barturen	Chile	5.32	
7	Araceli Bruschini	Argentina	5.27	
8	Beatriz Arancibia	Chile	5.06	

=== Shot put ===
5 November

Rank	Name	Nationality	Result	Notes
1st place, gold medalist(s)	Maria Boso	Brazil	13.80	
2nd place, silver medalist(s)	Lorena Prado	Chile	13.26	
3rd place, bronze medalist(s)	Marinalva dos Santos	Brazil	12.59	
4	Patricia Andrus	Venezuela	12.28	
5	Miriam Finochietti	Uruguay	12.12	
6	Patricia Weber	Argentina	12.11	
7	Ramona Brizuela	Argentina	12.01	
8	Patricia Guerrero	Peru	11.75	
9	Fulvia Benegas	Paraguay	11.10	
10	Mirta Fleitas	Uruguay	10.90	
11	Gladys Aguayo	Chile	9.22	

=== Discus throw ===
5 November

Rank	Name	Nationality	Result	Notes
1st place, gold medalist(s)	Odete Domingos	Brazil	51.56	CR
2nd place, silver medalist(s)	Thea Reinhardt	Brazil	49.68	
3rd place, bronze medalist(s)	Patricia Andrus	Venezuela	40.86	
4	Gladys Ortega	Argentina	39.98	
5	Miriam Finochietti	Uruguay	38.56	
6	Lorena Prado	Chile	37.62	
7	Ana Elena Gambaccini	Argentina	37.08	
8	Fulvia Benegas	Paraguay	35.14	

=== Javelin throw ===
4 November – Old model

Rank	Name	Nationality	Result	Notes
1st place, gold medalist(s)	Patricia Guerrero	Peru	45.46	
2nd place, silver medalist(s)	Neuza Trolezzi	Brazil	42.92	
3rd place, bronze medalist(s)	Magali Lopes	Brazil	41.18	
4	Ana María Campillay	Argentina	40.62	
5	Elsa Pérez	Chile	40.06	
6	Gladys Aguayo	Chile	39.12	
7	María Cristina Gauna	Argentina	38.24	
8	Berenice da Silva	Uruguay	25.46	

=== Pentathlon ===
4–5 November

The highest mark recorded in each event is highlighted in yellow

Rank	Athlete	Nationality	100m H	SP	HJ	LJ	800m	Points	Notes
1st place, gold medalist(s)	Conceição Geremias	Brazil	15.50	12.59	1.64	5.66	2:26.8	3863	
2nd place, silver medalist(s)	Themis Zambrzycki	Brazil	14.92	12.22	1.64	5.43	2:26.5	3856	
3rd place, bronze medalist(s)	Yvonne Neddermann	Argentina	15.30	11.39	1.35	5.39	2:26.8	3425	
4	Rosa Jerabek	Argentina	16.14	10.43	1.40	5.29	2:41.0	3170	
5	Alix Castillo	Venezuela	18.11	8.36	1.50	5.01	2:32.5	2992	
