= Ana María Desevici =

Uruguayan pentathlete (born 1955)

Personal information
- Nationality: Uruguayan
- Born: 8 November 1955 (age 69)
- Height: 1.77 m (5 ft 10 in)
- Weight: 69 kg (152 lb)

Sport
- Sport: Athletics
- Event: Pentathlon

Ana María Desivici Nekeforchuk (born 8 November 1955) is a Uruguayan athlete. She competed in the women's pentathlon at the 1976 Summer Olympics.

== International competitions ==
Year	Competition	Venue	Position	Event	Notes
Representing Uruguay
1970	South American Junior Championships	Cali, Colombia	5th	High jump	1.45 m
1970	South American Junior Championships	Cali, Colombia	7th	Long jump	5.29 m
1971	South American Championships	Lima, Peru	3rd	4 × 100 m relay	48.2 s
1971	South American Championships	Lima, Peru	2nd	Long jump	5.72 m
1972	South American Junior Championships	Asunción, Paraguay	8th (h)	100 m	12.9 s
1972	South American Junior Championships	Asunción, Paraguay	5th	4 × 100 m relay	51.6 s
1972	South American Junior Championships	Asunción, Paraguay	3rd	Long jump	5.42 m
1974	South American Championships	Santiago, Chile	4th	Long jump	5.64 m
1975	South American Championships	Rio de Janeiro, Brazil	5th	100 m hurdles	15.4 s
1975	South American Championships	Rio de Janeiro, Brazil	7th	High jump	1.59 m
1975	South American Championships	Rio de Janeiro, Brazil	4th	Long jump	5.74 m
1975	South American Championships	Rio de Janeiro, Brazil	4th	Pentathlon	3626 pts
1975	Pan American Games	Mexico City, Mexico	7th	Long jump	5.78 m
1975	Pan American Games	Mexico City, Mexico	9th	Pentathlon	3812 pts
1976	Olympic Games	Montreal, Canada	19th	Pentathlon	3628 pts

== Personal bests ==
- Pentathlon – 3812 (1975)
