= Athletics at the 1979 Pan American Games – Men's triple jump =

Men's triple jump at the 1979 Pan American Games
- Venue: Estadio Sixto Escobar
- Dates: 9 July
- Winning distance: 17.27

Medalists
Gold medal	João Carlos de Oliveira	Brazil
Silver medal	Willie Banks	United States
Bronze medal	James Butts	United States

The men's triple jump competition of the athletics events at the 1979 Pan American Games took place on 9 July at the Estadio Sixto Escobar. The defending Pan American Games champion was João Carlos de Oliveira of Brazil.

== Records ==
Prior to this competition, the existing world and Pan American Games records were as follows:

World record	João Carlos de Oliveira (BRA)	17.89	Mexico City, Mexico City	October 15, 1975
Pan American Games record	João Carlos de Oliveira (BRA)	17.89	Mexico City, Mexico City	October 15, 1975

== Results ==
All distances shown are in meters.

KEY:	WR	World Record	GR	Pan American Record

=== Final ===
Rank	Name	Nationality	Distance	Notes
1st place, gold medalist(s)	João Carlos de Oliveira	Brazil	17.27	
2nd place, silver medalist(s)	Willie Banks	United States	16.88	
3rd place, bronze medalist(s)	James Butts	United States	16.69	
4	Alejandro Herrera	Cuba	16.46	
5	Carmelo Martínez	Cuba	16.28	
6	Francisco de Oliveira	Brazil	15.93	
7	Wilfredo Almonte	Dominican Republic	15.69	
8	Ernesto Torres	Puerto Rico	15.06	
9	José Mangual	Puerto Rico	15.04	
10	Maxwell Peters	Antigua and Barbuda	13.97	
	Stephen Hanna	Bahamas	DNS	
	Ronald Chambers	Jamaica	DNS	
	Edgar Moreno	Venezuela	DNS	
	José Salazar	Venezuela	DNS	
