= Margarita Grun =

Uruguayan sprinter

Personal information
- Born: 24 March 1954 (age 72)

Sport
- Sport: Athletics
- Events: 200 metres, 400 metres

Margarita Grun (born 24 March 1954) is a retired Uruguayan sprinter. She represented her country in the 200 and 400 metres at the 1983 World Championships without reaching the second round.

== International competitions ==
Year	Competition	Venue	Position	Event	Notes
Representing Uruguay
1972	South American Junior Championships	Asunción, Paraguay	7th (h)	200 m	27.0
1972	South American Junior Championships	Asunción, Paraguay	6th	400 m	63.5
1972	South American Junior Championships	Asunción, Paraguay	5th	4 × 100 m relay	51.6
1972	South American Junior Championships	Asunción, Paraguay	4th	4 × 400 m relay	4:20.3
1974	South American Championships	Santiago, Chile	11th (h)	400 m	61.7
1974	South American Championships	Santiago, Chile	4th	4 × 400 m relay	3:56.2
1975	South American Championships	Rio de Janeiro, Brazil	3rd	200 m	24.9
1975	South American Championships	Rio de Janeiro, Brazil	4th	400 m	56.2
1975	South American Championships	Rio de Janeiro, Brazil	3rd	4 × 400 m relay	3:56.4
1975	Pan American Games	Mexico City, Mexico	18th (h)	200 m	24.72
1975	Pan American Games	Mexico City, Mexico	12th (h)	400 m	56.55
1977	South American Championships	Montevideo, Uruguay	8th	100 m	12.62
1977	South American Championships	Montevideo, Uruguay	5th	200 m	25.6
1977	South American Championships	Montevideo, Uruguay	6th	400 m	59.51
1977	South American Championships	Montevideo, Uruguay	4th	4 × 100 m relay	47.9
1977	South American Championships	Montevideo, Uruguay	6th	4 × 400 m relay	4:03.6
1979	South American Championships	Bucaramanga, Colombia	2nd	400 m	54.8
1979	South American Championships	Bucaramanga, Colombia	10th (h)	800 m	2:19.0
1982	Southern Cross Games	Santa Fe, Argentina	2nd	200 m	24.70
1982	Southern Cross Games	Santa Fe, Argentina	2nd	400 m	54.84
1983	World Championships	Rome, Italy	27th (qf)	200 m	24.59
1983	World Championships	Rome, Italy	26th (h)	400 m	56.84^{1}
1983	Pan American Games	Indianapolis, United States	8th	200 m	24.79
1983	Pan American Games	Indianapolis, United States	12th (h)	400 m	57.53
1983	South American Championships	Santa Fe, Argentina	3rd	200 m	24.9
1983	South American Championships	Santa Fe, Argentina	4th	400 m	55.6
1983	South American Championships	Santa Fe, Argentina	2nd	4 × 100 m relay	47.7
1983	South American Championships	Santa Fe, Argentina	4th	4 × 400 m relay	3:55.9
1985	South American Championships	Santiago, Chile	5th	200 m	24.47
1985	South American Championships	Santiago, Chile	3rd	400 m	54.39
1985	South American Championships	Santiago, Chile	4th	4 × 100 m relay	46.80
1985	South American Championships	Santiago, Chile	2nd	4 × 400 m relay	3:41.49

^{1}Did not start in the semifinals
