= 1973 South American Youth Championships in Athletics =

I South American Youth Championships in Athletics
- Dates: November 2–4
- Host city: Comodoro Rivadavia, Argentina
- Level: Youth
- Events: 31
- Participation: about 182 athletes from 7 nations

The 1st South American Youth Championships in Athletics were held in Comodoro Rivadavia, Argentina from November 2–4, 1973.

== Medal summary ==
Medal winners are published for boys and girls. Complete results can be found on the "World Junior Athletics History" website.

=== Men ===
Event	Gold		Silver		Bronze	
100 metres	Rogério Brito (BRA)	11.5	Javier Brasich (ARG)	11.8	Osvaldo Scovena (ARG)	11.9
200 metres	Javier Brasich (ARG)	24.2	Rogério Brito (BRA)	24.3	Néstor Darwich (ARG)	24.8
400 metres	Aníbal Lanz (ARG)	50.9	Patricio Proano (BRA)	51.4	Rodrigo Garcês (CHI)	51.4
800 metres	Arturo Zamorano (CHI)	2:05.8	Volney Silva (BRA)	2:06.4	Juan Holman (ARG)	2:08.5
1500 metres	Juan Holman (ARG)	4:18.4	Octavio O'Neill (CHI)	4:18.4	Alfredo Rufin (CHI)	4:20.4
1500 metres steeplechase	Octavio O'Neill (CHI)	4:34.9	Sérgio Soares (BRA)	4:42.9	Santiago Melo (CHI)	4:44.0
110 metres hurdles	Guillermo Assandri (ARG)	15.8	Gerardo Fassi (ARG)	15.9	Max Sommerfeld (PER)	16.3
300 metres hurdles	Guillermo Assandri (ARG)	39.7	Rodrigo Garcês (CHI)	39.8	Mauricio Besteiro (ARG)	40.2
High jump	Gilberto Lima (BRA)	1.88	Rubén Osorio (PAR)	1.88	Roberto Amadori (CHI)	1.85
Pole vault	Fernando Ruocco (URU)	3.45	Raúl Anadón (ARG)	3.31	Rubén Osorio (PAR)	3.24
Long jump	Hugo Martínez (PAR)	6.73w	Morita Yoshiyoki (BRA)	6.61w	Ricardo Jaureguiberry (ARG)	6.61w
Triple jump	Lucivaldo Romano (BRA)	13.43	Ivan Ferreira (BRA)	13.34	Hugo Martínez (PAR)	13.03
Shot put	Armando de Zorzi (BRA)	17.37	Ramón Ángel Garmendia (ARG)	14.50	Ricardo Gevert (CHI)	14.26
Discus throw	Ricardo Gevert (CHI)	48.48	Armando de Zorzi (BRA)	45.60	Luis Fernández (PER)	41.60
Hammer throw	Armando de Zorzi (BRA)	63.16	Jorge Iguri (ARG)	54.88	Aldo Cangiani (ARG)	46.98
Javelin throw	Ramón Ángel Garmendia (ARG)	51.88	Harald Glocker (PER)	50.60	Ricardo Gevert (CHI)	46.82
Hexathlon	Gilmar dos Santos (BRA)	3522	Héctor Bottegoni (ARG)	3303	Jorge Ratto (PER)	3272
4 × 100 metres relay	Brazil; F. Ferreira; Katsuhiko Nakaya; José Silva; Rogério Brito	44.3	Argentina; A. Ugolini; Osvaldo Scovena; Néstor Darwich; Javier Brasich	44.6	Chile; Cristian Rodríguez; J. Arguello; G. Huete; E. Cox	45.2
4 × 400 metres relay	Argentina; Mauricio Besteiro; Guillermo Assandri; Marcelo Leguizamón; Aníbal Lanz	3:30.6	Paraguay; G. Sayas; Ramon Migliorisi; Ángel Bogado; Ricardo Derene	3:31.3	Chile; Hugo Vicuña; Rodrigo Garcés; Arturo Zamorano; G. Huete	3:32.6

=== Women ===
Event	Gold		Silver		Bronze	
100 metres	Carmela Bolívar (PER)	13.0	Ivonne Neddermann (ARG)	13.2	Adriana Vives (ARG)	13.3
200 metres	Carmela Bolívar (PER)	26.4	Adriana Vives (ARG)	26.6	Ivonne Neddermann (ARG)	27.5
400 metres	Rita Femia (ARG)	59.7	Carina Müller (ARG)	60.0	Oriana Salas (CHI)	60.3
80 metres hurdles	Simone Krauthausen (PER)	12.3	Lilian Esperjesi (ARG)	13.0	Gloria Barturen (CHI)	13.2
High jump	Mónica Rodríguez (ARG)	1.59	Simone Krauthausen (PER)	1.59	Sonia Oliveira (BRA)	1.57
Long jump	Ivonne Neddermann (ARG)	5.69	Simone Krauthausen (PER)	5.51	Gloria Barturen (CHI)	5.48
Shot put	Verônica Brunner (BRA)	12.79	Fulvia Banegas (PAR)	10.38	Liliana López (ARG)	10.25
Discus throw	Verônica Brunner (BRA)	34.86	Melita Schusller (CHI)	32.26	Liliana López (ARG)	30.74
Javelin throw	Hannelise Illman (PER)	35.50	Laura Deguiz (ARG)	35.50	Miriam Ibarra (PAR)	34.62
Pentathlon	Rosemarie Boeck (PER)	3393	Liliana Sistarz (ARG)	3271	Miriam Gajardo (CHI)	3028
4 × 100 metres relay	Argentina; Hilda Capello; Carina Müller; Adriana Vives; Ivonne Neddermann	48.5	Peru; Hortencia Sala; Simone Krauthausen; Martha Fernández; Carmela Bolivár	49.2	Chile; Carolina Cox; Teresa Sanfurgo; D. Fernández; Paz Ábalos	49.8
4 × 400 metres relay	Argentina; Hilda Capello; Rita Femia; Susana Szeckman; Irma Quatrocchi	4:02.7	Chile; E. Álvarez; Oriana Salas; Consuelo Moreno; Gretel Rogers	4:03.6	Brazil; M. Milanes; Tânia Bernardes; Rosângela Nascimento; Miriam da Silva	4:13.1

== Medal table (unofficial) ==
* Host nation (Argentina)

Rank	Nation	Gold	Silver	Bronze	Total
1	Argentina (ARG)*	12	13	10	35
2	Brazil (BRA)	9	7	3	19
3	Peru (PER)	5	4	3	12
4	Chile (CHI)	3	4	12	19
5	Paraguay (PAR)	1	3	3	7
6	Uruguay (URU)	1	0	0	1
Totals (6 entries)		31	31	31	93

== Participation (unofficial) ==
Detailed result lists can be found on the "World Junior Athletics History" website. An unofficial count yields the number of about 182 athletes from about 7 countries:

- Argentina (38)
- Brazil (34)
- Chile (32)
- Ecuador (9)
- Paraguay (22)
- (Peru) Perú (32)
- Uruguay (15)
