= Delmo da Silva =

Brazilian sprinter (1954–2010)

Personal information
- Born: 9 June 1954 Rio de Janeiro, Brazil
- Died: 24 February 2010 (aged 55) Rio de Janeiro, Brazil

Sport
- Sport: Sprinting
- Event: 400 metres

Delmo da Silva (9 June 1954 – 24 February 2010) was a Brazilian sprinter. He competed in the men's 400 metres at the 1976 Summer Olympics.

He was the younger brother of another sprinter, Rui da Silva.

== International competitions ==
Year	Competition	Venue	Position	Event	Notes
Representing Brazil
1972	South American Junior Championships	Asunción, Paraguay	1st	200 m	22.4
1972	South American Junior Championships	Asunción, Paraguay	1st	4 × 100 m relay	3:26.3
1975	South American Championships	Rio de Janeiro, Brazil	1st	400 m	47.0
1975	South American Championships	Rio de Janeiro, Brazil	1st	4 × 400 m relay	3:09.2
1975	Pan American Games	Mexico City, Mexico	3rd	400 m	45.53
1976	Olympic Games	Montreal, Canada	16th (sf)	400 m	46.69
1977	World Cup	Düsseldorf, West Germany	3rd	4 × 400 m relay	3:02.77^{1}
1977	South American Championships	Montevideo, Uruguay	1st	400 m	47.70
1977	South American Championships	Montevideo, Uruguay	1st	4 × 400 m relay	3:15.1
1979	Pan American Games	San Juan, Puerto Rico	10th (sf)	400 m	46.81
1979	Pan American Games	San Juan, Puerto Rico	5th	4 × 400 m relay	3:10.9

^{1}Representing the Americas
