= Rui da Silva (athlete) =

Brazilian sprinter (1951–1999)

Personal information
- Born: 15 September 1951 Rio de Janeiro, Brazil
- Died: 5 May 1999 (aged 47) Rio de Janeiro, Brazil
- Height: 1.72 m (5 ft 8 in)
- Weight: 73 kg (161 lb)

Sport
- Sport: Sprinting
- Event: 100 metres
Medal record
Men's athletics
Representing Americas
IAAF World Cup
Bronze medal – third place	1977 Düsseldorf	4 × 100 metre relay

Rui da Silva (15 September 1951 – 5 May 1999) was a Brazilian sprinter. He competed in the men's 100 metres at the 1976 Summer Olympics. He was the older brother of another sprinter, Delmo da Silva. His team came in third place in the 4 × 100 metre relay at the 1977 IAAF World Cup.

== International competitions ==
Year	Competition	Venue	Position	Event	Notes
Representing Brazil
1974	South American Championships	Santiago, Chile	1st	100 m	10.5
1974	South American Championships	Santiago, Chile	1st	200 m	21.2
1974	South American Championships	Santiago, Chile	1st	4 × 100 m relay	40.3
1975	South American Championships	Rio de Janeiro, Brazil	1st	100 m	10.5
1975	South American Championships	Rio de Janeiro, Brazil	1st	200 m	20.9
1975	South American Championships	Rio de Janeiro, Brazil	1st	4 × 100 m relay	40.8
1975	Pan American Games	Mexico City, Mexico	7th	100 m	10.46
1975	Pan American Games	Mexico City, Mexico	4th	4 × 100 m relay	39.18
1976	Olympic Games	Montreal, Canada	15th (sf)	100 m	10.54
1976	Olympic Games	Montreal, Canada	5th	200 m	20.84
1977	World Cup	Düsseldorf, West Germany	3rd	4 × 100 m relay	38.66^{1}
1977	South American Championships	Montevideo, Uruguay	1st	100 m	10.3
1977	South American Championships	Montevideo, Uruguay	1st	200 m	21.3
1977	South American Championships	Montevideo, Uruguay	1st	4 × 100 m relay	41.4
1979	Pan American Games	San Juan, Puerto Rico	5th	100 m	10.41
1979	Pan American Games	San Juan, Puerto Rico	3rd	4 × 100 m relay	39.44

^{1}Representing the Americas

== Personal bests ==
Outdoor

- 100 metres – 10.36 (1975)
- 200 metres – 20.76 (1976)
