= Gustavo Dubarbier =

Personal information
- Born: 19 December 1952

Sport
- Sport: Sprinting
- Event(s): 100 metres, 200 metres

Gustavo Dubarbier (born 19 December 1952) is a retired Argentine sprinter. He won several medals at continental level.

== International competitions ==
Year	Competition	Venue	Position	Event	Notes
Representing Argentina
1974	South American Championships	Santiago, Chile	7th	100 m	10.8
1974	South American Championships	Santiago, Chile	5th	200 m	22.0
1974	South American Championships	Santiago, Chile	3rd	4 × 100 m relay	41.1
1975	South American Championships	Rio de Janeiro, Brazil	3rd	100 m	10.7
1975	South American Championships	Rio de Janeiro, Brazil	3rd	200 m	21.5
1975	South American Championships	Rio de Janeiro, Brazil	3rd	4 × 100 m relay	41.5
1975	South American Championships	Rio de Janeiro, Brazil	2nd	4 × 400 m relay	3:14.6
1975	Pan American Games	Mexico City, Mexico	15th (sf)	100 m	10.73
1975	Pan American Games	Mexico City, Mexico	14th (h)	200 m	21.61
1977	South American Championships	Montevideo, Uruguay	7th	100 m	11.0
1977	South American Championships	Montevideo, Uruguay	6th	200 m	22.4
1978	Southern Cross Games	La Paz, Bolivia	3rd	100 m	10.78
1978	Southern Cross Games	La Paz, Bolivia	4th	200 m	21.8
1979	South American Championships	Bucaramanga, Colombia	6th	100 m	10.7
1979	South American Championships	Bucaramanga, Colombia	3rd	4 × 100 m relay	40.4

== Personal bests ==
Outdoor

- 100 metres – 10.56 (Santiago 1979)
- 200 metres – 21.61 A (1.2 m/s, Mexico City 1975)
