= Maria Luísa Betioli =

Brazilian high jumper

Personal information
- Born: 1 September 1948 (age 77) São Paulo, Brazil
- Height: 1.78 m (5 ft 10 in)
- Weight: 59 kg (130 lb)

Sport
- Sport: Athletics
- Event: High jump

Maria Luísa Domingos Betioli (married Zanandrea; born 1 September 1948) is a Brazilian athlete. She competed in the women's high jump at the 1976 Summer Olympics.

Betioli attended Brigham Young University where she competed for the BYU Cougars track and field team, placing 3rd in the high jump at the 1982 AIAW Indoor Track and Field Championships.

Her personal best in high jump is 1.88 metres set in São Paulo in 1977.

== International competitions ==
Year	Competition	Venue	Position	Event	Notes
Representing Brazil
1971	South American Championships	Lima, Peru	5th	100 m hurdles	15.2 s
1971	South American Championships	Lima, Peru	5th	Pentathlon	3501 pts
1974	South American Championships	Santiago, Chile	3rd	100 m hurdles	15.0 s
1974	South American Championships	Santiago, Chile	1st	High jump	1.75 m
1974	South American Championships	Santiago, Chile	3rd	Pentathlon	3741 pts
1975	South American Championships	Rio de Janeiro, Brazil	1st	100 m hurdles	14.3 s
1975	South American Championships	Rio de Janeiro, Brazil	1st	High jump	1.75 m
1975	Pan American Games	Mexico City, Mexico	7th	100 m hurdles	14.35 s
1975	Pan American Games	Mexico City, Mexico	6th	4 × 100 m relay	45.21 s
1975	Pan American Games	Mexico City, Mexico	5th	High jump	1.81 m
1976	Olympic Games	Montreal, Canada	25th (q)	High jump	1.75 m
1977	South American Championships	Montevideo, Uruguay	10th (h)	200 m	26.2 s
1977	South American Championships	Montevideo, Uruguay	3rd	100 metres hurdles	14.80 s
1977	South American Championships	Montevideo, Uruguay	1st	High jump	1.80 m
