= Angel Guerreros =

Paraguayan sprinter

Personal information
- Nationality: Paraguayan
- Born: 7 January 1953 (age 73)

Sport
- Sport: Sprinting
- Event: 100 metres

Angel Guerreros (born 7 January 1953) is a Paraguayan sprinter. He competed in the men's 100 metres at the 1972 Summer Olympics.

Guerreros won two silver medals at the 1972 South American Junior Championships in Athletics, in the 100 m and 4 × 100 m relay.

He also competed at the 1975 Pan American Games in the 100 m and 200 m. He finished 4th in his 200 m heat on 15 October 1975, advancing to the semi-finals.

Guerreros led the Paraguayan Athletics Federation for several years after his retirement, keeping in touch with his contemporary competitors. He used his house as a meeting point for Juan Rieder, Modesto Garcia, and Francisco Rojas Soto, the three other members of Guerreros' Paraguayan record-setting 4 × 100 m relay team. He had lost touch with Garcia after competing but they reunited after the record was broken in 2014, at age 74.

== International competitions ==
Year	Competition	Venue	Position	Event	Notes
Representing Paraguay
1971	South American Championships	Lima, Peru	10th (h)	100 m	11.1
1971	South American Championships	Lima, Peru	12th (h)	200 m	23.1
1971	South American Championships	Lima, Peru	6th	4 × 100 m relay	42.9
1971	South American Championships	Lima, Peru	6th	4 × 400 m relay	3:35.5
1972	Olympic Games	Munich, West Germany	79th (h)	100 m	11.12
1972	South American Junior Championships	Asunción, Paraguay	2nd	100 m	11.1
1972	South American Junior Championships	Asunción, Paraguay	5th	200 m	23.2
1972	South American Junior Championships	Asunción, Paraguay	14th (h)	400 m	54.7
1972	South American Junior Championships	Asunción, Paraguay	2nd	4 × 100 m relay	43.4
1974	South American Championships	Santiago, Chile	10th (h)	100 m	11.0
1974	South American Championships	Santiago, Chile	11th (h)	200 m	22.7
1974	South American Championships	Santiago, Chile	4th	4 × 100 m relay	41.3
1975	Pan American Games	Mexico City, Mexico	6th	100 m	10.58
1975	Pan American Games	Mexico City, Mexico	15th (sf)	200 m	22.03
1977	South American Championships	Montevideo, Uruguay	27th (h)	100 m	11.03
1977	South American Championships	Montevideo, Uruguay	11th (h)	200 m	23.2
1977	South American Championships	Montevideo, Uruguay	5th	4 × 100 m relay	43.4

== Personal bests ==
- 100 metres – 11.03 (1975)
