= João Carlos de Oliveira =

Brazilian athlete

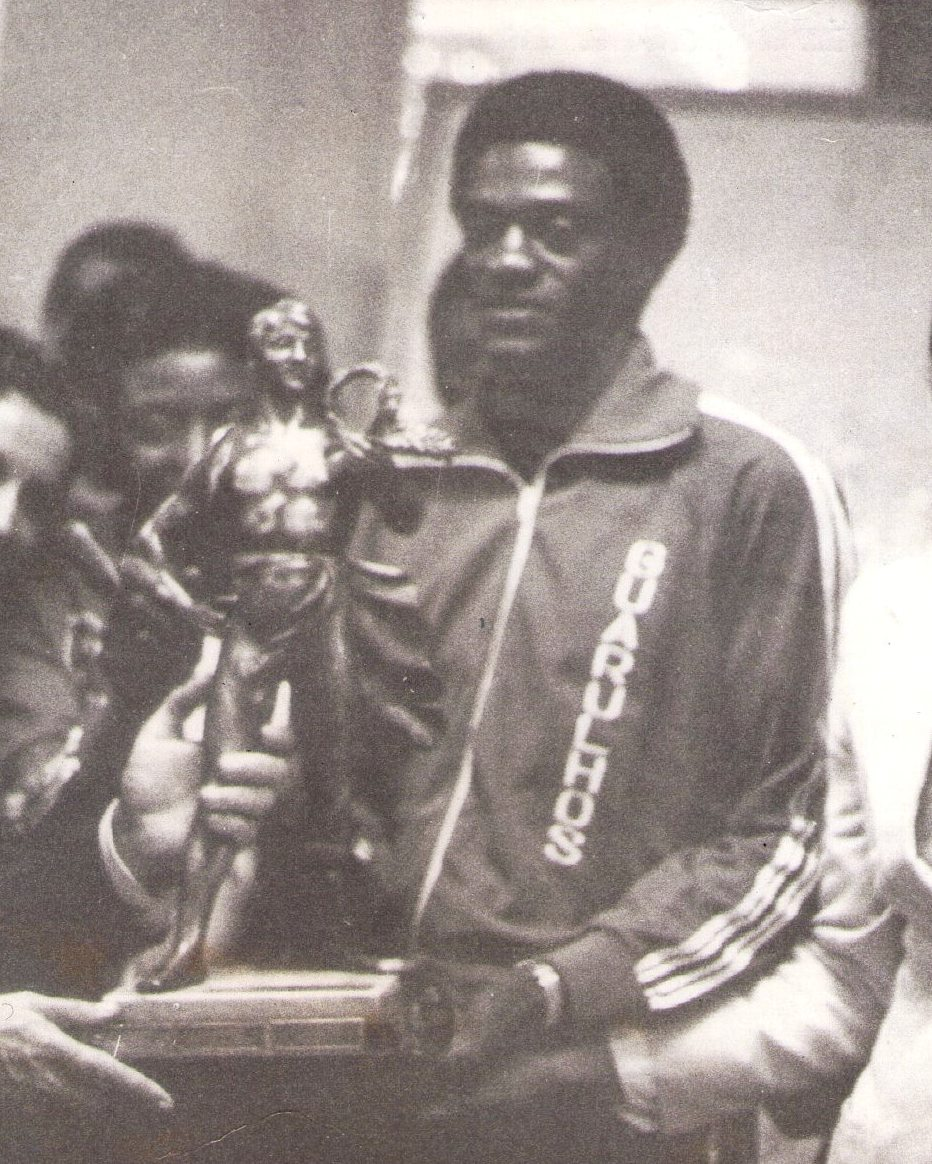

Personal information
- Born: May 28, 1954 Pindamonhangaba, São Paulo, Brazil
- Died: May 29, 1999 (aged 45) São Paulo, Brazil
Medal record
Men's athletics
Representing Brazil
Olympic Games
Bronze medal – third place	1976 Montreal	Triple jump
Bronze medal – third place	1980 Moscow	Triple jump
Pan American Games
Gold medal – first place	1975 Mexico City	Long jump
Gold medal – first place	1975 Mexico City	Triple jump
Gold medal – first place	1979 San Juan	Long jump
Gold medal – first place	1979 San Juan	Triple jump

João Carlos de Oliveira, also known as "João do Pulo" (May 28, 1954 – May 29, 1999) was a Brazilian athlete who competed in the triple jump and the long jump.

Born in Pindamonhangaba, São Paulo De Oliveira won two Olympic bronze medals. His personal best of 17.89 metres, set on October 15, 1975, in Pan American Games, stood as the world record until 1985. As of today, it is still in the top twenty of all-time best results in the event.

== Career ==
Orphaned by his mother, he started working at the age of seven, as a car washer. In 1973, coached by Pedro Henrique de Toledo, he broke the junior triple jump world record at the South American Athletics Championships with the mark of 14.75 m. In 1975, already as an adult athlete at the Pan American Games in Mexico City, the corporal of the Brazilian Army won the gold medal in the long jump with the mark of 8.19 m and, on October 15, also the gold medal in the triple jump, with the incredible mark of 17.89 m, breaking the world record of this modality in 45 cm, that belonged to the Soviet Viktor Saneyev.

He was the gold medal favorite in the triple jump at the Montreal Olympics, but, recovering from belly surgery, he jumped just 16.90 m and was surpassed by Saneyev (17.29 m) and the American James Butts (17.18 m), taking the bronze medal. In addition, he was fourth in the long jump. At the Pan American Games in Puerto Rico, he became twice champion in both the triple jump and the long jump, accumulating a four-time Pan American championship in two events. In the latter, he defeated none other than the future four-time Olympic champion of the event, Carl Lewis.

There exists some doubt on the judging of the 1980 Olympic men's triple jump final. Several jumps of winning distance by both Oliveira and Ian Campbell of Australia were adjudged as fouls by the all-Soviet judging panel, despite video replays showing this was not the case. One of Oliveira's jumps was estimated to be a new world record beyond eighteen metres. These decisions resulted in Soviet athletes Jaak Uudmäe and Viktor Saneyev winning the competition with performances in the low 17-metre area. Harry Seinberg, coach to Uudmäe, confirmed off-the-record that the judging had leaned in favour of the home athletes.

Only in 2000, twenty years after the Moscow Games, the Australian newspaper The Sydney Morning Herald, the largest in Australia, made a major report demonstrating that the Brazilian's canceled jumps were part of a Soviet operation to give Saneyev the fourth Olympic title. The plan didn't work out because of Uudmäe's best jump, but even so, the gold medal went to the USSR.

In contrast to the lack of luck in the Olympics, in the pre-World Championships in Athletics, João do Pulo was three-time world champion in the triple jump in 1977 (in Düsseldorf), 1979 (in Montreal) and 1981 (in Rome, with 17.37 m, beating Jaak Uudmäe, a year after the Olympics, and future world record holder Willie Banks of the United States). Flag bearer of Brazil in the opening parade in Montreal 1976 and in Moscow 1980, João was the main idol of the Brazilian sport between 1975 and 1981.

== Later life, death, and legacy ==
In 1981, he was in a car accident near São Paulo in which he lost one leg. Afterward, he became a vocal advocate for the rights of the disabled. He served in the Legislative Assembly of São Paulo from 1987 to 1995, as well as the 1988 Constituent Assembly. He died in 1999 from complications of alcoholism.

His world record was only broken almost ten years later, by the North American Willie Banks, with 17.97 m, in Indianapolis, on June 16, 1985. His Brazilian and South American record was only broken more than twenty-one years later, by Jadel Gregório, with 17.90 m, in Belém, on May 20, 2007 (who coincidentally was also an athlete of João do Pulo's former coach).

== International competitions ==
Year	Competition	Venue	Position	Event	Notes
Representing Brazil
1972	South American Junior Championships	Asunción, Paraguay	1st	Triple jump	14.67 m
1974	South American Championships	Santiago, Chile	7th	High jump	1.85 m
1974	South American Championships	Santiago, Chile	3rd	Long jump	7.17 m
1974	South American Championships	Santiago, Chile	1st	Triple jump	16.34 m
1975	South American Championships	Rio de Janeiro, Brazil	1st	4 × 100 m relay	40.8 s
1975	South American Championships	Rio de Janeiro, Brazil	1st	Long jump	7.66 m
1975	South American Championships	Rio de Janeiro, Brazil	1st	Triple jump	16.48 m
1975	Pan American Games	Mexico City, Mexico	4th	4 × 100 m relay	39.18 s
1975	Pan American Games	Mexico City, Mexico	1st	Long jump	8.19 m
1975	Pan American Games	Mexico City, Mexico	1st	Triple jump	17.89 m WR
1976	Olympic Games	Montreal, Canada	5th	Long jump	8.00 m
1976	Olympic Games	Montreal, Canada	3rd	Triple jump	16.90 m
1977	World Cup	Düsseldorf, West Germany	1st	Triple jump	16.68 m^{1}
1977	South American Championships	Montevideo, Uruguay	1st	Long jump	7.95 m
1977	South American Championships	Montevideo, Uruguay	1st	Triple jump	16.40 m
1979	Pan American Games	San Juan, Puerto Rico	1st	Long jump	8.18 m
1979	Pan American Games	San Juan, Puerto Rico	1st	Triple jump	17.27 m
1979	World Cup	Montreal, Canada	1st	Triple jump	17.02 m^{1}
1980	Olympic Games	Moscow, Soviet Union	12th (q)	Long jump	7.78 m^{2}
1980	Olympic Games	Moscow, Soviet Union	3rd	Triple jump	17.22 m
1981	World Cup	Rome, Italy	1st	Triple jump	17.37 m^{1}
1981	South American Championships	La Paz, Bolivia	1st	Triple jump	17.05 m

^{1}Representing the Americas

^{2}Did not start in the final

Records
Preceded by Viktor Sanyeyev	Men's Triple Jump World Record Holder; 15 October 1975 – 16 June 1985	Succeeded by Willie Banks
Awards
Preceded by Muhammad Ali	United Press International; Athlete of the Year; 1975	Succeeded by Alberto Juantorena
