= Athletics at the 1975 Pan American Games – Women's pentathlon =

Women's pentathlon at the Pan American Games

The women's pentathlon event at the 1975 Pan American Games was held in Mexico City on 15 and 16 October. It was the last edition where the 200 metres was contested as the last event of the pentathlon before being replaced by the 800 metres in 1979.

== Results ==
The highest mark recorded in each event is highlighted in yellow

Rank	Athlete	Nationality	100m H	SP	HJ	LJ	200m	Points	Notes
1st place, gold medalist(s)	Diane Jones	Canada	14.00	15.33	1.86	6.30	25.11	4673	
2nd place, silver medalist(s)	Gale Fitzgerald	United States	13.94	13.92	1.72	6.06	24.34	4486	
3rd place, bronze medalist(s)	Andrea Bruce	Jamaica	13.93	10.37	1.86	6.24	24.87	4391	
4	Edith Noeding	Peru	13.62	10.12	1.66	6.10	24.11	4257	
5	Conceição Geremias	Brazil	14.69	12.50	1.69	5.69	25.06	4136	
6	Dana Collins	United States	14.42	11.41	1.69	5.67	25.16	4086	
7	María Ángeles Cato	Mexico	14.76	10.66	1.63	5.68	25.15	3941	
8	Joanne Jones	Canada	15.00	13.43	1.57	5.52	25.83	3930	
9	Ana María Desevici	Uruguay	15.22	10.69	1.63	5.60	25.89	3812	
10	Mercedes Román	Mexico	14.71	10.93	1.54	5.11	26.35	3639	
11	Ivonne Neddermann	Argentina	15.14	10.72	1.48	5.15	25.67	3575	
12	Marisela Peralta	Dominican Republic	15.90	9.28	1.63	5.01	26.85	3430	
	Emilia Dyrzka	Argentina	14.47	12.09	1.45	DNS	–	DNF	
