= Fernando Ruocco =

Uruguayan athlete

Personal information
- Born: 12 May 1958 (age 68)

Sport
- Sport: Athletics
- Event: Pole vault

Fernando Ruocco (born 12 May 1958) is a retired Uruguayan athlete who specialised in the pole vault.

His personal best in the event is 5.00 metres set in Troisdorf in 1980. As of 2024, this is the still-standing national record. He was the first athlete from South America to clear 5 metres in the pole vault.

== International competitions ==
Year	Competition	Venue	Position	Notes
Representing Uruguay
1973	South American Youth Championships	Comodoro Rivadavia, Argentina	1st	3.45 m
1975	South American Championships	Rio de Janeiro, Brazil	3rd	4.00 m
1976	South American Junior Championships	Maracaibo, Venezuela	1st	4.20 m
1977	South American Championships	Montevideo, Uruguay	–	NM
1979	South American Championships	Bucaramanga, Colombia	1st	4.70 m
1981	South American Championships	La Paz, Bolivia	2nd	4.70 m
1982	Southern Cross Games	Santa Fe, Argentina	2nd	4.80 m
1983	Pan American Games	Caracas, Venezuela	6th	4.85 m
