= Emilio Mazzeo =

Argentine athlete

Personal information
- Full name: Emilio Angel Mazzeo
- Born: 23 March 1951 Córdoba, Argentina
- Died: 10 July 2017 (aged 66)

Sport
- Sport: Athletics
- Events: Long jump, triple jump, decathlon

Emilio Angel Mazzeo (23 March 1951 – 10 July 2017) was an Argentine athlete who competed primarily in the long jump and triple jump. He won several medals at continental level. He held national records in both events.

His brother, Jorge Mazzeo was also an athlete.

== International competitions ==
Year	Competition	Venue	Position	Event	Notes
Representing Argentina
1968	South American Junior Championships	São Bernardo do Campo, Brazil	3rd	Triple jump	13.88 m
1971	Pan American Games	Cali, Colombia	7th	Decathlon	6195 pts
1971	South American Championships	Lima, Peru	7th	Long jump	6.82 m
1971	South American Championships	Lima, Peru	6th	Triple jump	14.18 m
1971	South American Championships	Lima, Peru	3rd	Decathlon	6656 pts
1974	South American Championships	Santiago, Chile	1st	Long jump	7.29 m
1974	South American Championships	Santiago, Chile	4th	Triple jump	15.10 m
1975	South American Championships	Rio de Janeiro, Brazil	2nd	Long jump	7.39 m
1975	South American Championships	Rio de Janeiro, Brazil	6th	Triple jump	14.59 m
1975	Pan American Games	Mexico City, Mexico	7th	Triple jump	15.85 m
1977	South American Championships	Montevideo, Uruguay	4th	Triple jump	14.86 m

== Personal bests ==
Outdoor

- High jump – 2.00 (Buenos Aires 1974)
- Long jump – 7.51 (Córdoba 1975 – former NR)
- Triple jump – 15.85 A (Mexico City 1975 – former NR)
- Decathlon – 6478 (Lima 1971)
