= Emilia Dyrzka =

Argentine athlete (born 1946)

Personal information
- Full name: Emilia Eugenia Laura Dyrzka
- Born: 25 March 1946 (age 80)

Sport
- Sport: Athletics
- Event(s): 100 metres hurdles, pentathlon

Emilia Eugenia Laura Dyrzka (born 25 March 1946) is a retired Argentine athlete who competed in hurdling events and the pentathlon. She won multiple medals at continental level.

Her older brother Juan Carlos Dyrzka was also an athlete.

== International competitions ==
Year	Competition	Venue	Position	Event	Notes
Representing Argentina
1961	South American Championships	Lima, Peru	8th (h)	100 m	13.1
1962	Ibero-American Games	Madrid, Spain	5th	80 m hurdles	12.0
1962	Ibero-American Games	Madrid, Spain	2nd	4 × 100 m relay	48.9
1963	South American Championships	Cali, Colombia	4th	200 m	25.5
1963	South American Championships	Cali, Colombia	1st	80 m hurdles	11.5
1963	South American Championships	Cali, Colombia	2nd	4 × 100 m relay	47.8
1965	South American Championships	Rio de Janeiro, Brazil	3rd	100 m	12.5
1965	South American Championships	Rio de Janeiro, Brazil	5th	200 m	25.8
1965	South American Championships	Rio de Janeiro, Brazil	1st	80 m hurdles	11.6
1965	South American Championships	Rio de Janeiro, Brazil	2nd	4 × 100 m relay	47.9
1969	South American Championships	Quito, Ecuador	–	80 m hurdles	DNF
1971	Pan American Games	Cali, Colombia	6th (h)	100 m hurdles	14.52
1971	Pan American Games	Cali, Colombia	7th	Pentathlon	3641 pts
1971	South American Championships	Lima, Peru	1st	100 m hurdles	14.3
1971	South American Championships	Lima, Peru	4th	Pentathlon	3570 pts
1975	South American Championships	Rio de Janeiro, Brazil	2nd	100 m hurdles	14.6
1975	South American Championships	Rio de Janeiro, Brazil	3rd	Pentathlon	3708 pts
1975	Pan American Games	Mexico City, Mexico	–	Pentathlon	DNF
1978	Southern Cross Games	La Paz, Bolivia	3rd	100 m hurdles	14.74
1978	Southern Cross Games	La Paz, Bolivia	1st	4 × 100 m relay	46.06

== Personal bests ==
Outdoor

- 200 metres – 25.2h (NWI, Buenos Aires 1965) former NR
- 400 metres – 57.7h (Buenos Aires 1973)
- 100 metres hurdles – 14.27 A (NWI, Cali 1971), 14.1h (Buenos Aires 1973) former NR
- 400 metres hurdles – 66.4h (Buenos Aires 1978)
- Long jump – 5.56 m (Buenos Aires 1965)
- Shot put – 12.56 m (Buenos Aires 1967)
