= Yvonne Neddermann =

Argentine athlete (born 1957)

Personal information
- Born: 14 February 1957 (age 69)

Sport
- Sport: Athletics
- Event: Heptathlon

Yvonne Neddermann (born 14 February 1957) is a retired Argentine athlete who competed in combined events. She won multiple medals at regional level. In addition, she represented her country at two Pan American Games, in 1975 and 1979.

== International competitions ==
| Year | Competition | Venue | Position | Event | Notes |
Representing Argentina
| 1972 | South American Junior Championships | Asunción, Paraguay | 6th (h) | 100 m | 12.8 |
| 1972 | South American Junior Championships | Asunción, Paraguay | 3rd | 4 × 100 metres relay | 49.9 |
| 1973 | South American Youth Championships | Comodoro Rivadavia, Argentina | 2nd | 100 m | 13.2 |
| 1973 | South American Youth Championships | Comodoro Rivadavia, Argentina | 3rd | 200 m | 27.5 |
| 1973 | South American Youth Championships | Comodoro Rivadavia, Argentina | 1st | Long jump | 5.69 m |
| 1973 | South American Youth Championships | Comodoro Rivadavia, Argentina | 1st | 4 × 100 metres relay | 48.5 |
| 1974 | South American Junior Championships | Lima, Peru | 5th | 100 m hurdles | 16.3 |
| 1974 | South American Junior Championships | Lima, Peru | 1st | Long jump | 5.97 m |
| 1974 | South American Junior Championships | Lima, Peru | 4th | Pentathlon | 3567 pts |
| 1975 | South American Championships | Rio de Janeiro, Brazil | 6th | 100 m hurdles | 15.5 |
| 1975 | South American Championships | Rio de Janeiro, Brazil | 3rd | Long jump | 5.77 m |
| 1975 | South American Championships | Rio de Janeiro, Brazil | 5th | Pentathlon | 3619 pts |
| 1975 | Pan American Games | Mexico City, Mexico | 10th | Long jump | 5.45 m |
| 1975 | Pan American Games | Mexico City, Mexico | 11th | Pentathlon | 3575 pts |
| 1977 | South American Championships | Montevideo, Uruguay | 5th | 100 m hurdles | 15.59 |
| 1977 | South American Championships | Montevideo, Uruguay | 1st | Long jump | 5.65 m |
| 1977 | South American Championships | Montevideo, Uruguay | 3rd | Pentathlon | 3425 pts |
| 1978 | Southern Cross Games | La Paz, Bolivia | 2nd | 100 m hurdles | 14.34 |
| 1978 | Southern Cross Games | La Paz, Bolivia | 1st | 4 × 100 metres relay | 46.06 |
| 1978 | Southern Cross Games | La Paz, Bolivia | 3rd | Shot put | 12.10 m |
| 1978 | Southern Cross Games | La Paz, Bolivia | 1st | Long jump | 6.05 m |
| 1978 | Southern Cross Games | La Paz, Bolivia | 2nd | Pentathlon | 3625 pts |
| 1979 | Pan American Games | San Juan, Puerto Rico | 9th (h) | 100 m hurdles | 14.44 s |
| 1979 | Pan American Games | San Juan, Puerto Rico | 10th | Long jump | 5.54 m |
| 1979 | Pan American Games | San Juan, Puerto Rico | 6th | Pentathlon | 3815 pts |
| 1979 | South American Championships | Bucaramanga, Colombia | 1st | 100 m hurdles | 14.2 |
| 1979 | South American Championships | Bucaramanga, Colombia | 1st | 4 × 100 metres relay | 46.0 |
| 1979 | South American Championships | Bucaramanga, Colombia | 4th | 4 × 400 metres relay | 3:48.2 |
| 1979 | South American Championships | Bucaramanga, Colombia | 3rd | Long jump | 5.92 m |
| 1979 | South American Championships | Bucaramanga, Colombia | 3rd | Pentathlon | 3833 pts |
| 1981 | South American Championships | La Paz, Bolivia | 6th | Shot put | 11.78 m |
| 1981 | South American Championships | La Paz, Bolivia | 1st | Heptathlon | 5451 pts |
| 1983 | South American Championships | Santa Fe, Argentina | 6th | Long jump | 5.47 m |
| 1983 | South American Championships | Santa Fe, Argentina | 3rd | Heptathlon | 5273 pts |

== Personal bests ==
Outdoor

- 200 metres – 25.2 (Buenos Aires 1976)
- 100 metres hurdles – 14.34 A (La Paz 1978)
- 400 metres hurdles – 1:04.0 (Buenos Aires 1980)
- High jump – 1.63 (Santa Fe 1983)
- Long jump – 6.05 A (La Paz 1978)
- Shot put – 12.25 (Buenos Aires 1977)
- Heptathlon – 5241 A (La Paz 1978)

Indoor

- 60 metres hurdles – 9.15 (Hannover 1981)
- Long jump – 5.36 (Hannover 1981)
- Shot put – 10.51 (Hannover 1981)
