= Odete Domingos =

Personal information
- Full name: Odete Valentino Domingos
- Born: 5 September 1934 Campinas, Brazil
- Died: 27 November 2023 (aged 89) Campinas, Brazil

Sport
- Sport: Athletics
- Events: Discus throw, shot put
- Club: AAPP
- Coached by: Argemiro Roque

Odete Valentino Domingos (5 September 1934 – 27 November 2023) was a Brazilian athlete who specialised in the discus throw. She once held South American records in the shot put, discus throw and javelin throw in addition to winning multiple medals at continental level. Having won her last South American title at 49, she is the oldest winner of any event at the South American Championships.

Her husband and first coach was the Brazilian sprinter, Argemiro Roque.

== International competitions ==
Year	Competition	Venue	Position	Event	Notes
Representing Brazil
1958	South American Championships	Montevideo, Uruguay	6th	Discus throw	35.91 m
1959	Pan American Games	Chicago, United States	4th	4 × 100 m relay	51.8 s
1959	Pan American Games	Chicago, United States	8th	Discus throw	36.77 m
1963	Pan American Games	São Paulo, Brazil	7th	Discus throw	40.43 m
1963	South American Championships	Cali, Colombia	6th	Discus throw	37.08 m
1965	South American Championships	Rio de Janeiro, Brazil	2nd	Discus throw	39.92 m
1967	South American Championships	Buenos Aires, Argentina	9th	Shot put	10.47 m
1967	South American Championships	Buenos Aires, Argentina	1st	Discus throw	40.48 m
1969	South American Championships	Quito, Ecuador	1st	Discus throw	42.92 m
1971	South American Championships	Lima, Peru	1st	Discus throw	46.72 m
1974	South American Championships	Santiago, Chile	2nd	Discus throw	48.22 m
1975	South American Championships	Rio de Janeiro, Brazil	1st	Discus throw	50.78 m
1975	Pan American Games	Mexico City, Mexico	6th	Discus throw	47.76 m
1977	South American Championships	Montevideo, Uruguay	1st	Discus throw	51.56 m
1981	South American Championships	La Paz, Bolivia	1st	Discus throw	47.62 m
1983	Ibero-American Championships	Barcelona, Spain	2nd	Discus throw	46.98 m
1983	South American Championships	Santa Fe, Argentina	1st	Discus throw	49.30 m

== Personal bests ==
- Discus throw – 53.00 (Rio de Janeiro 1983) former AR
