= Jesús Villegas =

Colombian hurdler

Personal information
- Full name: Jesús A. Villegas Candelo
- Nationality: Colombian
- Born: 23 August 1946 (age 79)
- Height: 1.80 m (5 ft 11 in)
- Weight: 70 kg (154 lb)

Sport
- Sport: Track and field
- Event: 400 metres hurdles

Jesús A. Villegas Candelo (born 23 August 1946) is a Colombian hurdler. He competed in the men's 400 metres hurdles at the 1976 Summer Olympics.

== International competitions ==
| Year | Competition | Venue | Position | Event | Notes |
Representing Colombia
| 1969 | South American Championships | Quito, Ecuador | 7th (h) | 110 m hurdles | 15.0 |
| 1970 | Central American and Caribbean Games | Panama City, Panama | 5th | 110 m hurdles | 14.8 |
| 1970 | Central American and Caribbean Games | Panama City, Panama | – | Decathlon | DNF |
| 1975 | South American Championships | Rio de Janeiro, Brazil | 2nd | 400 m | 48.0 |
| 1975 | South American Championships | Rio de Janeiro, Brazil | 2nd | 110 m hurdles | 14.4 |
| 1975 | South American Championships | Rio de Janeiro, Brazil | 1st | 400 m hurdles | 50.8 |
| 1975 | South American Championships | Rio de Janeiro, Brazil | 2nd | 4 × 100 m relay | 41.3 |
| 1975 | South American Championships | Rio de Janeiro, Brazil | 4th | 4 × 400 m relay | 3:25.1 |
| 1975 | Pan American Games | Mexico City, Mexico | 8th | 110 m hurdles | 14.58 |
| 1975 | Pan American Games | Mexico City, Mexico | 6th | 400 m hurdles | 51.48 |
| 1976 | Olympic Games | Montreal, Canada | – | 400 m hurdles | DNF |
| 1977 | Bolivarian Games | La Paz, Bolivia | 1st | 110 m hurdles | 14.43 |
| 1977 | South American Championships | Montevideo, Uruguay | 2nd | 110 m hurdles | 15.04 |
| 1977 | South American Championships | Montevideo, Uruguay | 4th | 4 × 100 m relay | 43.0 |

== Personal bests ==
- 400 metres hurdles – 50.70 (1975)
