= Beatriz Allocco =

Retired Argentine sprinter

Personal information
- Full name: Beatriz Eva Allocco
- Born: 12 April 1955 (age 71)

Sport
- Sport: Athletics
- Event(s): 100 metres, 200 metres

Beatriz Eva Allocco (born 12 April 1955) is a retired Argentine sprinter. She represented her country at three editions of Pan American Games in addition to winning multiple medals at continental level. She is also a nine-time national champion in the 100 and 200 metres.

== International competitions ==
Year	Competition	Venue	Position	Event	Notes
Representing Argentina
1970	South American Junior Championships	Cali, Colombia	2nd	200 m	25.3
1970	South American Junior Championships	Cali, Colombia	1st	4 × 100 m relay	47.9
1971	Pan American Games	Cali, Colombia	14th (sf)	100 m	12.40
1971	Pan American Games	Cali, Colombia	5th	4 × 100 m relay	46.76
1971	South American Championships	Lima, Peru	5th	200 m	25.4
1971	South American Championships	Lima, Peru	1st	4 × 100 m relay	46.7
1975	South American Championships	Rio de Janeiro, Brazil	3rd	100 m	11.9
1975	South American Championships	Rio de Janeiro, Brazil	2nd	200 m	24.2
1975	South American Championships	Rio de Janeiro, Brazil	1st	4 × 100 m relay	45.9
1975	Pan American Games	Mexico City, Mexico	12th (sf)	100 m	11.88
1975	Pan American Games	Mexico City, Mexico	11th (sf)	200 m	24.31
1975	Pan American Games	Mexico City, Mexico	5th	4 × 100 m relay	44.90
1977	South American Championships	Montevideo, Uruguay	1st	100 m	11.97
1977	South American Championships	Montevideo, Uruguay	1st	200 m	24.7
1977	South American Championships	Montevideo, Uruguay	1st	4 × 100 m relay	46.7
1977	South American Championships	Montevideo, Uruguay	2nd	4 × 400 m relay	3:53.4
1978	Southern Cross Games	La Paz, Bolivia	1st	100 m	11.73
1978	Southern Cross Games	La Paz, Bolivia	1st	200 m	22.94
1978	Southern Cross Games	La Paz, Bolivia	1st	4 × 100 m relay	46.06
1979	Pan American Games	San Juan, Puerto Rico	11th (sf)	100 m	11.96
1979	Pan American Games	San Juan, Puerto Rico	8th	200 m	23.99
1979	South American Championships	Bucaramanga, Colombia	1st	100 m	11.7
1979	South American Championships	Bucaramanga, Colombia	1st	200 m	23.5
1979	South American Championships	Bucaramanga, Colombia	1st	4 × 100 m relay	46.0

== Personal bests ==
Outdoor

- 100 metres – 11.61 (NWI, Santiago 1978) former NR
- 200 metres – 22.94 A (NWI, La Paz 1978) NR
