= Athletics at the 1975 Pan American Games – Men's 110 metres hurdles =

Men's 110 metres hurdles at the Pan American Games

The men's 110 metres hurdles event at the 1975 Pan American Games was held in Mexico City on 15 and 16 October.

== Medalists ==
Gold	Silver	Bronze
Alejandro Casañas; Cuba	Danny Smith; Bahamas	Arnaldo Bristol; Puerto Rico

== Results ==
=== Heats ===
Wind:
Heat 1: 0.0 m/s, Heat 2: -3.0 m/s

Rank	Heat	Name	Nationality	Time	Notes
1	2	Alejandro Casañas	Cuba	13.76	Q
2	1	Charles Dobson	United States	13.95	Q
3	2	Arnaldo Bristol	Puerto Rico	13.98	Q
4	2	Charles Rich	United States	13.99	Q
5	1	Márcio Lomónaco	Brazil	14.21	Q
6	1	Danny Smith	Bahamas	14.49	Q
7	1	Rodolfo Chavira	Mexico	14.54	Q
8	1	Tito Steiner	Argentina	14.64	
9	2	Jesús Villegas	Colombia	14.69	Q
10	2	José Cartas	Mexico	14.75	
	1	Cristóbal de León	Dominican Republic	DNS	
	1	Anthony Spencer	Trinidad and Tobago	DNS	

=== Final ===
Wind: 0.0 m/s

Rank	Name	Nationality	Time	Notes
1st place, gold medalist(s)	Alejandro Casañas	Cuba	13.44	
2nd place, silver medalist(s)	Danny Smith	Bahamas	13.72	
3rd place, bronze medalist(s)	Arnaldo Bristol	Puerto Rico	13.74	
4	Charles Rich	United States	13.88	
5	Charles Dobson	United States	14.13	
6	Márcio Lomónaco	Brazil	14.27	
7	Rodolfo Chavira	Mexico	14.57	
8	Jesús Villegas	Colombia	14.58	
