= Francisco Pichott =

Personal information
- Full name: Francisco José Pichott de la Fuente
- Born: 13 February 1953 (age 73)
- Height: 1.86 m (6 ft 1 in)
- Weight: 75 kg (165 lb)

Sport
- Sport: Athletics
- Event: Triple jump

Francisco José Pichott de la Fuente (born 13 February 1953) is a retired Chilean athlete who specialised in the triple jump. He won multiple medals at regional level.

His personal best in the event is 16.37 metres, set in Santiago in 1982, which is a former national record. His personal best in the long jump is 7.57 metres set in 1982.

== International competitions ==
| Year | Competition | Venue | Position | Event | Notes |
Representing Chile
| 1970 | South American Junior Championships | Cali, Colombia | 6th | Long jump | 6.62 m |
| 1971 | South American Championships | Lima, Peru | 7th | Triple jump | 14.14 m |
| 1974 | South American Championships | Santiago, Chile | 5th | Triple jump | 14.97 m |
| 1975 | South American Championships | Rio de Janeiro, Brazil | 4th | 4 × 100 m relay | 42.5 s |
| 1975 | South American Championships | Rio de Janeiro, Brazil | 3rd | 4 × 400 m relay | 3:22.1 min |
| 1975 | South American Championships | Rio de Janeiro, Brazil | 6th | Long jump | 6.81 m |
| 1975 | South American Championships | Rio de Janeiro, Brazil | 3rd | Triple jump | 15.07 m |
| 1977 | South American Championships | Montevideo, Uruguay | 6th | Long jump | 6.92 m |
| 1977 | South American Championships | Montevideo, Uruguay | 3rd | Triple jump | 14.87 m |
| 1978 | Southern Cross Games | La Paz, Bolivia | 1st | 4 × 100 m relay | 40.35 s |
| 1978 | Southern Cross Games | La Paz, Bolivia | 1st | Long jump | 7.47 m |
| 1978 | Southern Cross Games | La Paz, Bolivia | 1st | Triple jump | 16.27 m |
| 1981 | South American Championships | La Paz, Bolivia | 2nd | 4 × 100 m relay | 40.4 s |
| 1981 | South American Championships | La Paz, Bolivia | 2nd | 4 × 400 m relay | 40.4 min |
| 1981 | South American Championships | La Paz, Bolivia | 1st | Long jump | 7.55 m |
| 1981 | South American Championships | La Paz, Bolivia | 2nd | Triple jump | 16.23 m |
| 1982 | Southern Cross Games | Santa Fe, Argentina | 1st | 4 × 100 m relay | 41.00 s |
| 1982 | Southern Cross Games | Santa Fe, Argentina | 1st | Long jump | 7.44 m |
| 1982 | Southern Cross Games | Santa Fe, Argentina | 1st | Triple jump | 15.73 m (w) |
| 1983 | Pan American Games | Caracas, Venezuela | 6th | Triple jump | 14.39 m |
| 1983 | South American Championships | Santa Fe, Argentina | 4th | 4 × 100 m relay | 42.0 s |
| 1983 | South American Championships | Santa Fe, Argentina | 7th | Long jump | 6.85 m |
| 1983 | South American Championships | Santa Fe, Argentina | 1st | Triple jump | 15.64 m |
| 1985 | South American Championships | Santiago, Chile | 5th | Long jump | 6.92 m |
| 1985 | South American Championships | Santiago, Chile | 4th | Triple jump | 15.33 m |
| 1986 | South American Games | Santiago, Chile | 2nd | Triple jump | 15.35 m |
| 1987 | South American Championships | São Paulo, Brazil | 8th | Triple jump | 14.14 m |
