= Athletics at the 1967 Pan American Games – Men's shot put =

Men's shot put at the Pan American Games

The men's shot put event at the 1967 Pan American Games was held in Winnipeg on 29 July.

== Results ==
Rank	Name	Nationality	Result	Notes
1st place, gold medalist(s)	Randy Matson	United States	19.83	
2nd place, silver medalist(s)	Neal Steinhauer	United States	19.45	
3rd place, bronze medalist(s)	Dave Steen	Canada	18.51	
4	George Puce	Canada	18.51	
5	José Carlos Jacques	Brazil	16.25	
6	Mario Peretti	Argentina	15.63	
	Dagoberto Gonzáles	Colombia	DNS	
	Mike Mercer	Canada	DNS	
