= Athletics at the 1975 Pan American Games – Men's 400 metres hurdles =

Men's 400 metres hurdles at the Pan American Games

The men's 400 metres hurdles event at the 1975 Pan American Games was held in Mexico City on 13 and 14 October.

== Medalists ==
Gold	Silver	Bronze
James King; United States	Ralph Mann; United States	Dámaso Alfonso; Cuba

== Results ==
=== Heats ===
Rank	Heat	Name	Nationality	Time	Notes
1	2	James King	United States	49.90	Q
2	1	Dámaso Alfonso	Cuba	50.10	Q
3	2	Jesús Villegas	Colombia	50.70	Q
4	1	David Jarvis	Canada	51.09	Q
5	2	Iván Mangual	Puerto Rico	51.65	Q
6	2	Fabio Zúñiga	Colombia	51.82	Q
7	1	Ralph Mann	United States	52.04	Q
8	2	Hugo Tanino	Argentina	52.32	
9	1	Enrique de la Mora	Mexico	52.45	Q
10	2	Enrique Aguirre	Mexico	52.76	
11	1	Francisco Rojas	Paraguay	52.78	
12	2	Rigoberto Rincón	Dominican Republic	54.48	

=== Final ===
Rank	Name	Nationality	Time	Notes
1st place, gold medalist(s)	James King	United States	49.80	
2nd place, silver medalist(s)	Ralph Mann	United States	50.04	
3rd place, bronze medalist(s)	Dámaso Alfonso	Cuba	50.19	
4	Iván Mangual	Puerto Rico	50.69	
5	Fabio Zúñiga	Colombia	50.83	
6	Jesús Villegas	Colombia	51.48	
7	David Jarvis	Canada	51.82	
8	Enrique de la Mora	Mexico	53.15	
