= Mario Peretti =

Argentine athlete (born 1943)

Personal information
- Full name: Mario Norberto Peretti
- Born: 10 September 1943 (age 82)

Sport
- Sport: Athletics
- Event(s): Shot put, discus throw

Mario Norberto Peretti (born 10 September 1943) is a retired Argentine athlete who specialised in the shot put and discus throw. He won several medals at continental level.

== International competitions ==
Year	Competition	Venue	Position	Event	Notes
Representing Argentina
1965	South American Championships	Rio de Janeiro, Brazil	3rd	Shot put	15.00 m
1967	Pan American Games	Winnipeg, Canada	6th	Shot put	15.63 m
1967	South American Championships	Buenos Aires, Argentina	2nd	Shot put	15.52 m
1969	South American Championships	Quito, Ecuador	2nd	Shot put	15.65 m
1969	South American Championships	Quito, Ecuador	6th	Discus throw	42.24 m
1971	Pan American Games	Cali, Colombia	5th	Shot put	16.23 m
1971	South American Championships	Lima, Peru	3rd	Shot put	15.63 m
1971	South American Championships	Lima, Peru	6th	Discus throw	43.82 m
1975	South American Championships	Rio de Janeiro, Brazil	4th	Shot put	15.00 m
1975	South American Championships	Rio de Janeiro, Brazil	3rd	Discus throw	47.82 m

== Personal bests ==
Outdoor

- Shot put – 16.36 metres (Bahía Blanca 1971)
- Discus throw – 48.26 metres (Bahía Blanca 1974)
