= Fabio Zúñiga (hurdler) =

Personal information
- Born: 1946 (age 78–79)

Sport
- Sport: Sprinting
- Event: 400 metres hurdles

Fabio Zúñiga (born 1946) is a retired Colombian athlete who specialised in the 400 metres hurdles. He won multiple medals at regional level.

His personal best in the event is 50.61 seconds set in Santo Domingo in 1974.

== International competitions ==
Year	Competition	Venue	Position	Event	Notes
Representing Colombia
1971	Pan American Games	Cali, Colombia	5th (h)	800 m	1:52.24
1971	Pan American Games	Cali, Colombia	8th	4 × 400 m relay	3:09.5
1973	Bolivarian Games	Panama City, Panama	1st	400 m hurdles	51.10
1973	Central American and Caribbean Championships	Maracaibo, Venezuela	2nd	400 m hurdles	52.0
1974	Central American and Caribbean Games	Santo Domingo, Dominican Republic	1st	400 m hurdles	50.61
1974	South American Championships	Santiago, Chile	–	400 m hurdles	DQ
1975	South American Championships	Rio de Janeiro, Brazil	2nd	400 m hurdles	51.2
1975	South American Championships	Rio de Janeiro, Brazil	2nd	4 × 100 m relay	41.3
1975	South American Championships	Rio de Janeiro, Brazil	4th	4 × 400 m relay	3:25.1
1975	Pan American Games	Mexico City, Mexico	5th	400 m hurdles	50.83
1977	Bolivarian Games	La Paz, Bolivia	1st	400 m hurdles	51.94
1977	Bolivarian Games	La Paz, Bolivia	3rd	4 × 100 m relay	41.84
1977	Bolivarian Games	La Paz, Bolivia	2nd	4 × 400 m relay	3:13.3
1977	South American Championships	Montevideo, Uruguay	4th	400 m hurdles	54.8
1977	South American Championships	Montevideo, Uruguay	4th	4 × 400 m relay	3:23.5
