= Athletics at the 1975 Pan American Games – Women's long jump =

Women's long jump at the Pan American Games

The women's long jump event at the 1975 Pan American Games was held in Mexico City on 14 October.

== Medalists ==
Gold	Silver	Bronze
Ana Alexander; Cuba	Martha Watson; United States	Kathy McMillan; United States

== Results ==
=== Qualification ===
Qualifying distance: 6.20

Rank	Name	Nationality	Result	Notes
1	Kathy McMillan	United States	6.47	q, GR
2	Martha Watson	United States	6.39	q
3	Silvina Pereira da Silva	Brazil	6.25	q
4	Diane Jones	Canada	6.07	q
5	Ana Alexander	Cuba	5.85	q
6	Marcia Garbey	Cuba	5.78	q
7	Yvonne Neddermann	Argentina	5.60	q
8	María Ángeles Cato	Mexico	5.59	q
9	Ana María Desevici	Uruguay	5.57	q
10	Melita Hersst	Suriname	5.31	q
11	Georgine Koorndijk	Suriname	5.25	q
12	Shonel Ferguson	Bahamas	5.05	q
13	Olga González	Guatemala	4.97	
	Brenda Eisler	Canada	DNS	

=== Final ===
Rank	Name	Nationality	#1	#2	#3	#4	#5	#6	Result	Notes
1st place, gold medalist(s)	Ana Alexander	Cuba	6.16	6.21	6.39	x	6.37	6.63	6.63	GR
2nd place, silver medalist(s)	Martha Watson	United States	6.57	6.33	6.51	6.53	6.42	6.42	6.57	
3rd place, bronze medalist(s)	Kathy McMillan	United States	x	6.29	6.37	6.49	6.03	6.46	6.49	
4	Silvina Pereira da Silva	Brazil	6.44	6.07	6.35	6.13	6.27	6.27	6.44	
5	Marcia Garbey	Cuba	x	6.22	6.38	6.31	6.21	6.20	6.38	
6	Diane Jones	Canada	6.18	x	x	6.18	x	–	6.18	
7	Ana María Desevici	Uruguay							5.78	
8	Georgine Koorndijk	Suriname							5.68	
9	Melita Herfst	Suriname							5.49	
10	Yvonne Neddermann	Argentina							5.45	
11	Shonel Ferguson	Bahamas							5.31	
	María Ángeles Cato	Mexico							DNS	
