= Rafael Rossi =

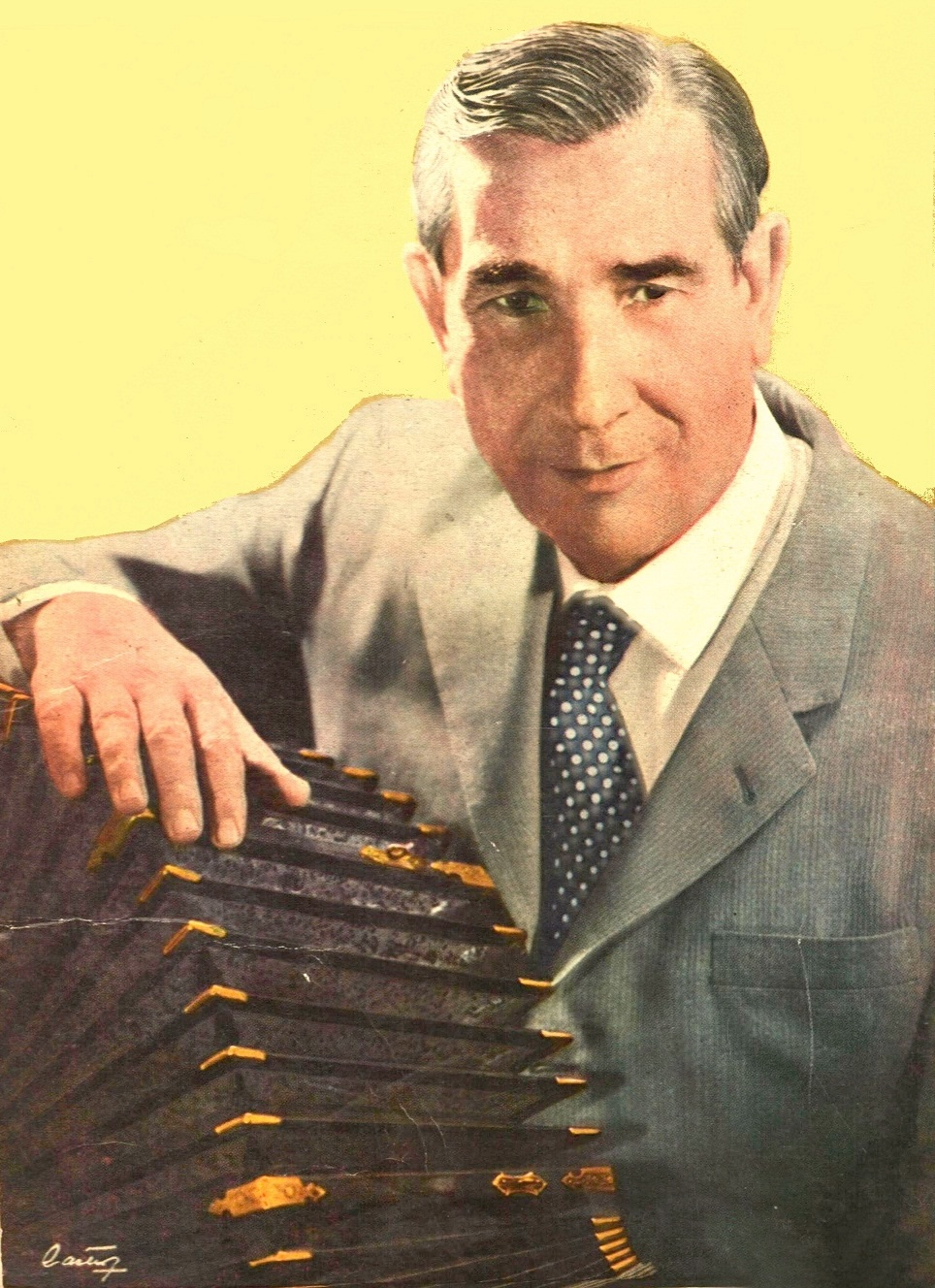

Background information
- Born: Rafael Rossa; 28 December 1896; Mercedes, Buenos Aires, Argentina
- Died: 24 December 1982 (aged 85) Buenos Aires, Argentina
- Genres: Tango, Argentine folk music
- Occupation(s): Bandoneonist, Composer, Orchestra conductor
- Instrument: Bandoneón

Rafael Rossi (28 December 1896 – 24 December 1982) was an Argentine bandoneonist, orchestra conductor, and composer dedicated to folk music and tango.

== Professional career ==
In 1912, he traveled to Buenos Aires to work as a painter. He became interested in the bandoneon and began studying at the Conservatory of Don José De Caro, which he left in 1914. He started a wandering and self-taught life. First, he lived in Junín and its surrounding area before settling for a time in Vedia. Then he passed through Rufino in 1915, Huinca Renancó, Del Campillo, Río Cuarto, Firmat, Elortondo, until he returned to Mercedes to fulfill his military service.

Rafael Rossi settled in Buenos Aires permanently, linking up with José Martínez in 1919.

In 1920, he participated with Francisco Canaro and Roberto Firpo in the giant orchestra for the carnivals. From that year until 1935, he was with Canaro.

In 1920, he met Carlos Gardel, to whom he gave a series of his own compositions, which Gardel quickly recorded, leading to a strong friendship between them. He lived at number 17 Butteler Street.

At the Odeón company, since Roberto Firpo had exclusive rights to record tangos with an orchestra for the Max Glucksmann company, Rossi was assigned to record folk music. He married Juana Herminia Gandino and had a daughter, Ada Norma Rossi.

He died in Buenos Aires on 24 December 1982.

== Works ==
As a composer, he created a large number of tangos, among the most remembered are:

- "Senda florida", lyrics by Eugenio Cárdenas
- "Por el llano", lyrics by Eugenio Cárdenas
- "Ave cantora", lyrics by Eugenio Cárdenas
- "Perdonada", lyrics by Eugenio Cárdenas
- "La milonga", lyrics by Eugenio Cárdenas
- "Fiesta criolla", lyrics by Eugenio Cárdenas
- "Rosas de abril", lyrics by Eugenio Cárdenas
- "Ebrio", lyrics by José Rial
- "Corazoncito", lyrics by José Rial
- "Primero yo", lyrics by José Rial
- "Como abrazao a un rencor", lyrics by Antonio Podestá
- "Sos de Chiclana", lyrics by Julio Navarrine
- "Recordándote"
- "Cañaveral", zamba
- "Como las margaritas"
- "La pastelera", ranchera
