= 1975 South American Championships in Athletics =

- Dates: 26–31 August
- Host city: Rio de Janeiro, Brazil
- Venue: Estádio Célio de Barros
- Events: 37
- Participation: 163 athletes from 7 nations

The 1975 South American Championships in Athletics were held at the Estádio Célio de Barros in Rio de Janeiro, Brazil, between 26 and 31 August.

== Medal summary ==
=== Men's events ===
Event	Gold		Silver		Bronze	
100 metres	Rui da Silva; Brazil	10.5	Nelson dos Santos; Brazil	10.7	Gustavo Dubarbier; Argentina	10.7
200 metres	Rui da Silva; Brazil	20.9 =CR	Jorge Mathias; Brazil	21.5	Gustavo Dubarbier; Argentina	21.5
400 metres	Delmo da Silva; Brazil	47.0	Jesús Villegas; Colombia	48.0	Pedro Teixeira; Brazil	48.4
800 metres	Carlos Villar; Argentina	1:50.6	Darcy Pereira; Brazil	1:51.4	Agberto Guimarães; Brazil	1:51.8
1500 metres	Jesús Barrero; Colombia	3:50.2	Abel Córdoba; Argentina	3:50.9	Cosme do Nascimento; Brazil	3:52.4
5000 metres	Domingo Tibaduiza; Colombia	14:01.2 CR	Víctor Mora; Colombia	14:02.2	Edmundo Warnke; Chile	14:05.6
10,000 metres	Víctor Mora; Colombia	28:45.8 CR	Domingo Tibaduiza; Colombia	28:45.8	Edmundo Warnke; Chile	28:46.2
Marathon	Héctor Rodríguez; Colombia	2:12:09 CR	Brígido Ferreira; Brazil	2:21:56	César Pastrano; Ecuador	2:28:55
110 metres hurdles	Márcio Lomónaco; Brazil	14.2 CR	Jesús Villegas; Colombia	14.4	Alfredo Guzmán; Chile	14.8
400 metres hurdles	Jesús Villegas; Colombia	50.8 CR	Fabio Zúñiga; Colombia	51.2	Aroldo Evangelista da Silva; Brazil	51.7
3000 metres steeplechase	José Romão Silva; Brazil	8:46.0 CR	Víctor Mora; Colombia	8:53.8	Jesús Barrero; Colombia	9:00.4
4 × 100 metres relay	Brazil; Ronaldo Lobato; Nelson dos Santos; João Carlos de Oliveira; Rui da Silva	40.8	Colombia; Benjamín Herrera; Jesús Villegas; Fabio Zúñiga; Julio Escobar	41.3	Argentina; Carlos Martínez; Carlos Bertotti; Raúl Ham; Gustavo Dubarbier	41.5
4 × 400 metres relay	Brazil; Geraldo Silva; Aroldo Evangelista da Silva; Pedro Teixeira; Delmo da Silva	3:09.2 CR	Argentina; Gustavo Dubarbier; Rubén Buscaglia; Hugo Tanino; Carlos Bertotti	3:14.6	Chile; Alfredo Guzmán; Juan Santiago Gordón; Francisco Pichott; Alfredo Silva	3:22.1
20 kilometres road walk	Ernesto Alfaro; Colombia	1:39:12 CR	Rafael Vega; Colombia	1:39:52	Adalberto Scorza; Argentina	1:42:15
High jump	Benedito Francisco; Brazil	2.10 CR	Luis Barrionuevo; Argentina	2.03	Daniel Mamet; Argentina	2.03
Pole vault	Renato Bortolocci; Brazil	4.50 =CR	Ciro Valdés; Colombia	4.50	Fernando Ruocco; Uruguay	4.00
Long jump	João Carlos de Oliveira; Brazil	7.66 CR	Emilio Mazzeo; Argentina	7.39	Ronaldo Lobato; Brazil	7.33
Triple jump	João Carlos de Oliveira; Brazil	16.48 CR	Nelson Prudêncio; Brazil	16.45	Francisco Pichott; Chile	15.07
Shot put	Juan Turri; Argentina	18.21 CR	José Jacques; Brazil	16.53	José Luiz Carabolante; Brazil	16.39
Discus throw	Sérgio Thomé; Brazil	50.84	José Jacques; Brazil	49.64	Mario Peretti; Argentina	47.82
Hammer throw	Darwin Piñeyrúa; Uruguay	61.20	José Vallejo; Argentina	61.10	Celso de Moraes; Brazil	60.84
Javelin throw	Jorge Peña; Chile	71.74 CR	Mario Sotomayor; Colombia	71.16	Paulo de Faría; Brazil	69.40
Decathlon	Tito Steiner; Argentina	7615 AR	Geraldo Rodrigues; Brazil	6939	Alfredo Silva; Chile	6794

=== Women's events ===
Event	Gold		Silver		Bronze	
100 metres	Silvina Pereira; Brazil	11.7 =CR	Carmela Bolívar; Peru	11.9	Beatriz Allocco; Argentina	11.9
200 metres	Silvina Pereira; Brazil	23.4 AR	Beatriz Allocco; Argentina	24.2	Margarita Grün; Uruguay	24.9
400 metres	Alejandra Ramos; Chile	55.7	Valdea Chagas; Brazil	55.9	Miriam da Silva; Brazil	56.0
800 metres	Ana María Nielsen; Argentina	2:10.7 CR	Rosângela Verissimo; Brazil	2:10.8	Alejandra Ramos; Chile	2:12.1
1500 metres	Ana María Nielsen; Argentina	4:27.0 CR	Iris Fernández; Argentina	4:31.9	Mara Führmann; Brazil	4:34.7
100 metres hurdles	Maria Luisa Betioli; Brazil	14.3	Emilia Dyrzka; Argentina	14.6	Viviane Nouailhetas; Brazil	14.7
4 × 100 metres relay	Argentina; Belkis Fava; Angela Godoy; Liliana Cragno; Beatriz Allocco	45.9 CR	Brazil; Maria Amorim; Nivea Pacifico; Elisabeth Nunes; Silvina Pereira	45.9	Peru; Adriana Caruggi; Beatriz Pacheco; Carmela Bolivár; Simone Krauthausen	48.5
4 × 400 metres relay	Brazil; Maria da Silva; Rosângela Verissimo; Valdea Chagas; Miriam da Silva	3:43.8 CR	Argentina; Angela Godoy; Rita Femia; Adriana Britos; Graciela Ghelfi	3:52.6	Uruguay; Alicia Vicent; Laura Oyhantocábal; Josefa Vicent; Margarita Grün	3:56.4
High jump	Maria Luisa Betioli; Brazil	1.75 =CR	Jurema da Silva; Brazil	1.68	Rosemarie Boeck; Peru	1.62
Long jump	Silvina Pereira; Brazil	6.11 CR	Marlene Nascimento; Brazil	5.84	Yvonne Neddermann; Argentina	5.77
Shot put	Maria Boso; Brazil	14.05	Rosa Molina; Chile	13.52	Verônika Brunner; Brazil	13.33
Discus throw	Odete Domingos; Brazil	50.78 AR	Maria Boso; Brazil	45.18	Gladys Ortega; Argentina	42.24
Javelin throw	Mariela Zapata; Colombia	43.72	Bárbara dos Santos; Brazil	41.10	María Elena Rojas; Chile	40.68
Pentathlon	Conceição Geremias; Brazil	3904	Themis Zambrzycki; Brazil	3790	Emilia Dyrzka; Argentina	3708

== Medal table ==
Rank	Nation	Gold	Silver	Bronze	Total
1	Brazil	21	16	12	49
2	Colombia	7	10	1	18
3	Argentina	6	9	10	25
4	Chile	2	1	8	11
5	Uruguay	1	0	3	4
6	Peru	0	1	2	3
7	Ecuador	0	0	1	1
Totals (7 entries)		37	37	37	111

== Participating nations ==
- Argentina (41)
- Brazil (57)
- Chile (20)
- Colombia (17)
- Ecuador (4)
- Peru (12)
- Uruguay (12)
