= Athletics at the 1975 Pan American Games – Men's triple jump =

Men's triple jump at the Pan American Games

The men's triple jump event at the 1975 Pan American Games was held in Mexico City on 15 October.

== Results ==
Rank	Name	Nationality	#1	#2	#3	#4	#5	#6	Result	Notes
1st place, gold medalist(s)	João Carlos de Oliveira	Brazil	x	17.89	–	x	–	–	17.89	WR
2nd place, silver medalist(s)	Tommy Haynes	United States	16.73	17.20	16.28	16.74	x	16.92	17.20	
3rd place, bronze medalist(s)	Milan Tiff	United States	16.77	16.87	16.54	16.98	16.36	16.52	16.98	
4	Nelson Prudêncio	Brazil	x	16.74	16.85	–	x	16.57	16.85	
5	Gustavo Platt	Cuba	x	x	15.53	15.91	16.10	16.62	16.62	
6	Armando Herrera	Cuba							16.35	
7	Emilio Mazzeo	Argentina							15.85	
8	Dave Watt	Canada	15.06	15.52	15.30	15.28	14.99	15.21	15.52	
9	Mike Sharpe	Bermuda							15.29	
10	Anthony Wade	Bermuda							14.87	
	José Luis Salinas	Mexico							NM	
