= 1972 South American Junior Championships in Athletics =

IX South American Junior Championships in Athletics
- Dates: October 21–25
- Host city: Asunción, Paraguay
- Level: Under-19
- Events: 33
- Participation: about 194 athletes from 8 nations

The ninth South American Junior Championships in Athletics were held in Asunción, Paraguay from October 21–25, 1972.

== Participation (unofficial) ==
Detailed result lists can be found on the "World Junior Athletics History" website. An unofficial count yields the number of about 194 athletes from about 8 countries: Argentina (40), Brazil (32), Chile (33), Colombia (22), Ecuador (6), Paraguay (24), Peru (22), Uruguay (15).

== Medal summary ==
Medal winners are published for men and women Complete results can be found on the "World Junior Athletics History" website.

=== Men ===
Event	Gold		Silver		Bronze	
100 metres	Welbe Barreto (BRA)	10.9	Ángel Guerrero (PAR)	11.1	Jorge Lobera (ARG)	11.1
200 metres	Delmo da Silva (BRA)	22.4	Welbe Barreto (BRA)	22.5	Diego Valencia (COL)	22.5
400 metres	Pedro Teixeira (BRA)	49.8	Francisco Bozzo (CHI)	50.6	Francisco Rojas (PAR)	50.9
800 metres	Ángel Holman (ARG)	1:58.6	Ary Pinto (BRA)	1:59.3	André Pereira (BRA)	2:00.2
1500 metres	Antonio Tello (ARG)	4:04.1	Jairo Correa (COL)	4:05.1	André Pereira (BRA)	4:05.7
3000 metres	Jairo Correa (COL)	8:58.6	Luis Tipán (ECU)	9:05.2	Carlos Soria (ECU)	9:08.7
110 metres hurdles	Nicolás Rodillo (CHI)	16.3	Eduardo Sosa (ARG)	16.5	Rodolfo Iturraspe (ARG)	16.6
400 metres hurdles	Francisco Rojas (PAR)	53.9	Roberto Comisso (ARG)	57.5	Rodolfo Iturraspe (ARG)	58.6
1500 metres steeplechase	Germán Aranda (COL)	4:31.6	Roberto Assumpção (BRA)	4:34.9	Antonio Tello (ARG)	4:35.1
4 × 100 metres relay	Colombia; Rafael Nieto; Diego Valencia; Ernesto Herrera; Arnoldo Vega	43.3	Paraguay; Ángel Guerreros; Juan Rieder; César Vega; Francisco Rojas	43.4	Ecuador; Ramiro Del Pozo; Roberto Erazo; Pablo Hidalgo; Fabian Zapata	43.9
4 × 400 metres relay	Brazil; Delmo da Silva; Lucio da Luz; Pedro Teixeira; Ary Pinto	3:26.3	Colombia; Rafael Uribe; Álvaro Castillo; Ernesto Herrera; Diego Valencia	3:28.6	Argentina; Roberto Comisso; Antonio Tello; Edelso Augsburger; Ángel Holman	3:31.3
High jump	Milton Reis (BRA)	1.90	José Machado (BRA)	1.85	Daniel Abugattás (PER)	1.80
Pole vault	Ernesto Koike (BRA)	4.00	Juan Rossetti (ARG)	3.70	Raúl Lyon (CHI)	3.70
Long jump	Héctor Elizón (ARG)	6.90	Geraldo Rodrigues (BRA)	6.84	César Vega (PAR)	6.50
Triple jump	João Carlos de Oliveira (BRA)	14.67	Rodney Gomes (BRA)	14.07	Carlos Arrastía (ARG)	13.98
Shot put	Joaquim Pérez (CHI)	14.29	Humberto Vianna (BRA)	14.13	Carlos Castro (BRA)	13.33
Discus throw	Edval Petrechen (BRA)	42.62	Oscar Attes (ARG)	38.62	Eduardo Galvão (BRA)	36.46
Hammer throw	Francisco Pedro (ARG)	53.20	José Rangel (COL)	48.28	Jorge Maldonado (COL)	46.72
Javelin throw	Dante Bertorello (ARG)	55.64	Humberto Vianna (BRA)	53.24	Adolfo Leyva (CHI)	53.20
Pentathlon*	Geraldo Rodrigues (BRA)	3653	Pablo Pérez (COL)	3518	Luis Betancourt (COL)	3460

* = another source rather states: Hexathlon

=== Women ===
Event	Gold		Silver		Bronze	
100 metres	Leslie Cooper (CHI)	12.5	Carmela Bolívar (PER)	12.7	Ivete Barbosa (BRA)	13.0
200 metres	Carmela Bolívar (PER)	25.5	Hilda Javier (URU)	25.8	Ivete Barbosa (BRA)	26.2
400 metres	Carla Ramos (CHI)	59.4	Hilda Javier (URU)	59.5	Magaly Zumaeta (PER)	59.6
800 metres	Rosângela Verissimo (BRA)	2:21.0	Magaly Zumaeta (PER)	2:23.5	Carla Ramos (CHI)	2:23.6
100 metres hurdles	Edith Noeding (PER)	15.0	Elisa Barros (BRA)	16.0	Hildegard Krause (BRA)	16.0
4 × 100 metres relay	Peru; Carmela Bolívar; Martha Fernández; Angelina Trelles; Edith Noeding	49.4	Brazil; Rosa Barros; Cristina Nagy; Ivette Barbosa; Conceição Geremias	49.4	Argentina; Ivonne Neddermann; Lilian García; Susana Torres; Adriana Vives	49.9
4 × 400 metres relay	Brazil; Cristina Nagy; Rosangela Verissimo; Conceição Geremias; Ivette Barbosa	4:08.0	Chile; Carla Ramos; Oriana Salas; Consuelo Moreno; Alejandra Ramos	4:11.5	Argentina; Irma Quatrocchi; Liliana Colla; Susana Torres; Liliana Simonetti	4:19.7
High jump	Catalina Recordón (CHI)	1.60	Cecilia Rossi (CHI)	1.50	Mónica Rodríguez (ARG)	1.45
Long jump	Conceição Geremias (BRA)	5.86	Edith Noeding (PER)	5.63	Ana Desevici (URU)	5.42
Shot put	Verônica Brunner (BRA)	12.28	Eucaris Echevarría (COL)	11.37	Soledad Jiménez (PER)	10.84
Discus throw	Verônica Brunner (BRA)	36.28	Eucaris Echevarría (COL)	33.70	Gladys Sánchez (ARG)	32.20
Javelin throw	María Rojas (CHI)	35.14	Asunción Figueroa (CHI)	34.20	Susana Sánchez (ARG)	34.18
Pentathlon	Edith Noeding (PER)	3432	Mirtha Fleitas (URU)	2957	Hildegard Krause (BRA)	2947

== Medal table (unofficial) ==
* Host nation (Paraguay)

Rank	Nation	Gold	Silver	Bronze	Total
1	Brazil	14	10	8	32
2	Chile	6	4	3	13
3	Argentina	5	4	11	20
4	Peru	4	3	3	10
5	Colombia	3	6	3	12
6	Paraguay*	1	2	2	5
7	Uruguay	0	3	1	4
8	Ecuador	0	1	2	3
Totals (8 entries)		33	33	33	99
