= Themis Zambrzycki =

Brazilian athlete

- Country (sports): Brazil
- Born: 20 October 1960 (age 66)
- Prize money: $36,013

Singles
- Career record: 62–73
- Career titles: 0 WTA, 1 ITF
- Highest ranking: No. 268 (4 July 1988)

Doubles
- Career record: 70–63
- Career titles: 0 WTA, 2 ITF
- Highest ranking: No. 147 (9 November 1987)

Grand Slam doubles results
- Australian Open: 1R (1990)
- Wimbledon: 1R (1989)
- US Open: 1R (1988)

Themis Zambrzycki (married name Glatman) (born October 20, 1960) is a retired Brazilian multi-sport athlete and tennis player.

She was the 1976 South American Junior Champion in the long jump, shot put and pentathlon, plus the silver medalist in the 100 metres hurdles. In 1977 she competed at the senior level South American Championships, taking silver in the hurdles, long jump and pentathlon. In 1979, she won the long jump and pentathlon, with a silver in the shot put.

She competed for Brigham Young University from 1978–80, winning the AIAW National Championship in the outdoor Pentathlon all three years and indoor champion in 1980. During her years in the United States, she also competed in the national championships, placing in the pentathlon all three years, winning in 1980.

As money making opportunities for track and field athletes, particularly female athletes, were rare, she changed her focus to professional tennis, making it to the WTA tour by 1986.

== Athletics career ==
Year	Competition	Venue	Position	Event	Notes
Representing Brazil
1975	South American Championships	Rio de Janeiro, Brazil	2nd	Pentathlon	3790 pts
1976	South American Junior Championships	Maracaibo, Venezuela	2nd	100 m hurdles	14.50
1976	South American Junior Championships	Maracaibo, Venezuela	1st	Long jump	5.99 m
1976	South American Junior Championships	Maracaibo, Venezuela	1st	Shot put	11.89 m
1976	South American Junior Championships	Maracaibo, Venezuela	1st	Pentathlon	4124 pts
1977	South American Championships	Montevideo, Uruguay	2nd	100 m hurdles	14.76 s
1977	South American Championships	Montevideo, Uruguay	2nd	Long jump	5.49 m
1977	South American Championships	Montevideo, Uruguay	2nd	Pentathlon	3856 pts
1979	South American Championships	Bucaramanga, Colombia	1st	Long jump	6.03 m
1979	South American Championships	Bucaramanga, Colombia	2nd	Shot put	13.84 m
1979	South American Championships	Bucaramanga, Colombia	1st	Pentathlon	4117 pts

=== Personal bests ===
Outdoor

- Long jump – 6.39 metres (Tempe 1980)

== ITF finals ==
=== Singles (1–1) ===
Legend
$10,000 tournaments

Result	No.	Date	Tournament	Surface	Opponent	Score
Win	1.	6 March 1988	Tel Aviv, Israel	Hard	(Netherlands) Nicolette Rooimans	2–6, 7–5, 6–1
Loss	2.	19 June 1988	Madeira, Portugal	Hard	(Republic of Ireland) Siobhán Nicholson	6–1, 4–6, 6–8

=== Doubles (2–6) ===
Result	No.	Date	Tournament	Surface	Partner	Opponents	Score
Loss	1.	28 July 1985	Columbus, United States	Clay	(United States) Alison Winston	(Australia) Karen Deed (United States) Stephanie Savides	2–6, 2–6
Loss	2.	13 April 1986	Adelaide, Australia	Grass	(New Zealand) Brenda Perry	(United States) Anna-Maria Fernandez (New Zealand) Julie Richardson	2–6, 1–6
Loss	3.	16 June 1986	Fayetteville, United States	Hard	(Netherlands) Digna Ketelaar	(Netherlands) Carin Bakkum (Netherlands) Manon Bollegraf	3–6, 6–7^{(3)}
Loss	4.	20 October 1986	Saga, Japan	Grass	(Netherlands) Marianne van der Torre	(Indonesia) Yayuk Basuki (Indonesia) Suzanna Wibowo	2–6, 3–6
Win	5.	29 June 1987	Mexico City, Mexico	Hard	(Netherlands) Carin Bakkum	(Mexico) Lucila Becerra (Mexico) Maluca Llamas	6–3, 6–4
Loss	6.	7 November 1988	Jaffa, Israel	Hard	(Netherlands) Colette Sely	(Israel) Ilana Berger (Israel) Hagit Ohayon	3–6, 4–6
Win	7.	12 June 1989	Algarve, Portugal	Hard	(Netherlands) Ingelise Driehuis	(South Africa) Robyn Field (South Africa) Michelle Anderson	6–2, 4–6, 6–0
Loss	8.	3 June 1990	San Luis Potosí, Mexico	Hard	(Mexico) Lucila Becerra	(Philippines) Jean Lozano (Mexico) Lupita Novelo	3–6, 6–4, 1–6
