= Rafael Vega =

Colombian racewalker

Personal information
- Full name: Rafael Vega Hernández
- Nationality: Colombian
- Born: 22 August 1951 (age 74)
- Height: 1.70 m (5 ft 7 in)
- Weight: 63 kg (139 lb)

Sport
- Sport: Athletics
- Event: Racewalking

Rafael Vega Hernández (born 22 August 1951) is a Colombian racewalker. He competed in the men's 20 kilometres walk at the 1976 Summer Olympics.

== Personal bests ==
- 20 kilometres walk – 1:30:03 (1974)
