= Athletics at the 1983 Pan American Games – Women's 4 × 400 metres relay =

Women's 4 × 400 metres relay at the Pan American Games

The Women's 4 × 400 metres relay event at the 1983 Pan American Games was held in Caracas, Venezuela on 28 August.

== Results ==
Rank	Nation	Athletes	Time	Notes
1st place, gold medalist(s)	United States	Alice Jackson, Judi Brown, Easter Gabriel, Kelia Bolton	3:29.97	
2nd place, silver medalist(s)	Canada	Andrea Page, Gwen Wall, Christine Slythe, Jillian Richardson	3:30.24	
3rd place, bronze medalist(s)	Cuba	Mayra Guerra, Nery McKeen, Mercedes Álvarez, Ana Fidelia Quirot	3:30.76	
4	Trinidad and Tobago	Yolanda Small, Janice Bernard, Maxine McMillan, Angela Williams	3:37.36	
5	Puerto Rico	Vilma Paris, Janice Carlo, Angelita Lind, Nilsa Paris	3:42.90	
6	Venezuela	Yaneris Guerra, Virginia Davis, Florencia Chilberry, Elsa Antúnez	3:46.50	
7	Antigua and Barbuda	Joycelyn Joseph, Gloria Smith, Terry Juliens, Laverne Bryan	3:47.38	
