= Athletics at the 1983 Summer Universiade – Women's 400 metres hurdles =

The women's 400 metres hurdles event at the 1983 Summer Universiade was held at the Commonwealth Stadium in Edmonton, Canada on 10 and 11 July 1983.

== Medalists ==
Gold	Silver	Bronze
Yekaterina Fesenko; Soviet Union	Yelena Filipishina; Soviet Union	Gwen Wall; Canada

== Results ==
=== Heats ===
Rank	Heat	Athlete	Nationality	Time	Notes
1	1	Yelena Filipishina	Soviet Union	56.05	Q
2	2	Yekaterina Fesenko	Soviet Union	56.31	Q
3	2	Judi Brown	United States	57.41	Q
4	1	Giuseppina Cirulli	Italy	57.42	Q
5	2	Gwen Wall	Canada	57.43	Q
6	1	Sharieffa Barksdale	United States	57.95	Q
7	1	Andrea Page	Canada	58.94	q
8	1	Lisbeth Helbing	Switzerland	1:00.81	q
	2	Nawal El Moutawakel	Morocco	DQ	

=== Final ===
Rank	Athlete	Nationality	Time	Notes
1st place, gold medalist(s)	Yekaterina Fesenko	Soviet Union	54.97	UR
2nd place, silver medalist(s)	Yelena Filipishina	Soviet Union	56.10	
3rd place, bronze medalist(s)	Gwen Wall	Canada	56.10	
4	Judi Brown	United States	57.42	
5	Giuseppina Cirulli	Italy	57.78	
6	Andrea Page	Canada	58.45	
7	Lisbeth Helbing	Switzerland	1:02.35	
8	Sharieffa Barksdale	United States	1:04.29	
