= Athletics at the 1983 Pan American Games – Women's 400 metres hurdles =

Women's 400 metres hurdles at the Pan American Games

The women's 400 metres hurdles event at the 1983 Pan American Games was held in Caracas, Venezuela on 23 and 24 August. This was the first time that the event was held at the Games.

== Medalists ==
Gold	Silver	Bronze
Judi Brown; United States	Sharrieffa Barksdale; United States	Gwen Wall; Canada

== Results ==
=== Heats ===
Rank	Heat	Name	Nationality	Time	Notes
1	2	Judi Brown	United States	57.29	Q
2	1	Sharrieffa Barksdale	United States	57.50	Q
3	2	Sandra Farmer	Jamaica	57.69	Q
4	1	Gwen Wall	Canada	57.92	Q
5	2	Mercedes Mesa	Cuba	58.90	Q
6	2	Andrea Page	Canada	59.08	q
7	1	Alma Vázquez	Mexico	59.37	Q
8	1	Vilma Paris	Puerto Rico	1:00.15	q
9	2	Felicia Candelario	Dominican Republic	1:00.46	
10	1	Margit Weise	Brazil	1:01.44	

=== Final ===
Rank	Name	Nationality	Time	Notes
1st place, gold medalist(s)	Judi Brown	United States	56.03	
2nd place, silver medalist(s)	Sharrieffa Barksdale	United States	56.09	
3rd place, bronze medalist(s)	Gwen Wall	Canada	56.93	
4	Sandra Farmer	Jamaica	57.61	
5	Alma Vázquez	Mexico	58.12	
6	Mercedes Mesa	Cuba	58.30	
7	Andrea Page	Canada	58.49	
8	Vilma Paris	Puerto Rico	1:00.17	
