= 1983 World Championships in Athletics – Women's 400 metres hurdles =

1983 IAAF World Championships in Helsinki, Finland

These are the official results of the Women's 400 metres Hurdles event at the 1983 IAAF World Championships in Helsinki, Finland. There were a total number of 31 participating athletes, with four qualifying heats, two semi-finals and the final held on Wednesday 1983-08-10.

== Medalists ==
Gold	Yekaterina Fesenko; Soviet Union (URS)
Silver	Ana Ambrazienė; Soviet Union (URS)
Bronze	Ellen Fiedler; East Germany (GDR)

== Records ==
Existing records at the start of the event.

World Record	Ana Ambrazienė (URS)	54.02	Moscow, USSR	June 11, 1983
Championship Record	New event			

== Final ==
RANK	FINAL	TIME
	Yekaterina Fesenko (URS)	54.12
	Ana Ambrazienė (URS)	54.15
	Ellen Fiedler (GDR)	54.55
4.	Petra Pfaff (GDR)	54.64
5.	Petra Krug (GDR)	54.76
6.	Ann-Louise Skoglund (SWE)	54.80
7.	Susan Morley (GBR)	56.04
8.	Cristieana Cojocaru (ROU)	56.26

== Semi-finals ==
- Held on Tuesday 1983-08-09

RANK	HEAT 1	TIME
1.	Petra Pfaff (GDR)	55.77
2.	Yekaterina Fesenko (URS)	55.99
3.	Ann-Louise Skoglund (SWE)	56.01
4.	Susan Morley (GBR)	56.09
5.	Debbie Flintoff (AUS)	56.63
6.	Gwen Wall (CAN)	56.68
7.	Judi Brown (USA)	57.98
—	Hilde Fredriksen (NOR)	DNS

RANK	HEAT 2	TIME
1.	Ana Ambrazienė (URS)	55.18
2.	Ellen Fiedler (GDR)	55.23
3.	Petra Krug (GDR)	55.98
4.	Cristieana Cojocaru (ROU)	56.71
5.	Sharrieffa Barksdale (USA)	56.81
6.	Nawal El Moutawakil (MAR)	57.10
7.	Anna Filicková (TCH)	57.64
8.	Christine Slythe (CAN)	58.53

== Qualifying heats ==
- Held on Monday 1983-08-08

RANK	HEAT 1	TIME
1.	Yekaterina Fesenko (URS)	56.43
2.	Ann-Louise Skoglund (SWE)	56.80
3.	Gwen Wall (CAN)	57.14
4.	Judi Brown (USA)	57.14
5.	Giuseppina Cirulli (ITA)	57.43
6.	Rose Tata-Muya (KEN)	58.09
7.	Liu Guihua (CHN)	59.39
8.	Felicia Candelario (DOM)	1:00.72

RANK	HEAT 2	TIME
1.	Ana Ambrazienė (URS)	56.30
2.	Susan Morley (GBR)	56.58
3.	Petra Krug (GDR)	56.87
4.	Anna Filicková (TCH)	57.09
5.	Ruth Kyalisima (UGA)	57.58
6.	Helle Sichlau (DEN)	57.90
7.	Tonja Brown (USA)	58.00
8.	Ovrill Dwyer-Brown (JAM)	58.40

RANK	HEAT 3	TIME
1.	Nawal El Moutawakil (MAR)	56.52
2.	Petra Pfaff (GDR)	56.56
3.	Hilde Fredriksen (NOR)	56.66
4.	Christine Slythe (CAN)	57.40
5.	Sandra Farmer (JAM)	57.97
6.	Verona Elder (GBR)	58.74
7.	Tuija Helander (FIN)	59.43
—	Mary Wagner (FRG)	DNF

RANK	HEAT 4	TIME
1.	Debbie Flintoff (AUS)	56.47
2.	Cristieana Cojocaru (ROU)	56.49
3.	Ellen Fiedler (GDR)	56.58
4.	Sharrieffa Barksdale (USA)	56.60
5.	Gladys Taylor (GBR)	58.25
6.	Andrea Page (CAN)	58.55
7.	Marcela Sevcikova (TCH)	1:00.34

== See also ==
- 1982 Women's European Championships 400m Hurdles (Athens)
- 1984 Women's Olympic 400m Hurdles (Los Angeles)
- 1986 Women's European Championships 400m Hurdles (Stuttgart)
- 1988 Women's Olympic 400m Hurdles (Seoul)
