= Athletics at the 1983 Pan American Games – Men's 1500 metres =

Men's 1500 metres at the Pan American Games

The men's 1500 metres event at the 1983 Pan American Games was held in Caracas, Venezuela on 26 August.

== Results ==
Rank	Name	Nationality	Time	Notes
1st place, gold medalist(s)	Agberto Guimarães	Brazil	3:42.91	
2nd place, silver medalist(s)	Ross Donoghue	United States	3:43.09	
3rd place, bronze medalist(s)	Chuck Aragon	United States	3:44.57	
4	Eduardo Castro	Mexico	3:44.76	
5	Omar Ortega	Argentina	3:47.03	
6	Pedro Cáceres	Argentina	3:48.59	
7	Ricardo Vera	Uruguay	3:48.64	
8	Philippe Lahuerte	Canada	3:50.76	
9	Luis Munguía	Nicaragua	3:54.68	
10	José Díaz	Venezuela	3:56.07	
11	Dale Jones	Antigua and Barbuda	3:56.17	
12	Thomas Nelson	Antigua and Barbuda	4:21.55	
