= Athletics at the 1983 Pan American Games – Women's 800 metres =

Women's 800 metres at the Pan American Games

The women's 800 metres event at the 1983 Pan American Games was held in Caracas, Venezuela on 23 and 24 August.

== Medalists ==
Gold	Silver	Bronze
Nery McKeen; Cuba	Ranza Clark; Canada	Alejandra Ramos; Chile

== Results ==
=== Heats ===
Rank	Heat	Name	Nationality	Time	Notes
1	1	Ranza Clark	Canada	2:05.06	Q
2	1	Eloína Kerr	Cuba	2:05.19	Q
3	1	Diana Richburg	United States	2:05.67	Q
4	2	Angelita Lind	Puerto Rico	2:06.22	Q
5	2	Nery McKeen	Cuba	2:06.48	Q
6	2	Christine Slythe	Canada	2:06.54	Q
7	2	Alejandra Ramos	Chile	2:06.81	q
8	2	Lee Arbogast	United States	2:07.09	q
9	1	Eucaris Caicedo	Colombia	2:07.63	
10	1	Adriana Marchena	Venezuela	2:08.58	
11	1	Laverne Bryan	Antigua and Barbuda	2:10.31	
12	1	Liliana Góngora	Argentina	2:13.21	
13	2	Joycelyn Joseph	Antigua and Barbuda	2:14.32	
14	2	Iyiechia Petrus	United States Virgin Islands	2:15.72	
15	2	Virginia Davis	Venezuela	2:15.72	

=== Final ===
Rank	Name	Nationality	Time	Notes
1st place, gold medalist(s)	Nery McKeen	Cuba	2:02.20	
2nd place, silver medalist(s)	Ranza Clark	Canada	2:02.44	
3rd place, bronze medalist(s)	Alejandra Ramos	Chile	2:03.65	
4	Christine Slythe	Canada	2:03.71	
5	Eloína Kerr	Cuba	2:04.96	
6	Diana Richburg	United States	2:05.29	
7	Angelita Lind	Puerto Rico	2:07.19	
8	Lee Arbogast	United States	2:07.83	
