= Athletics at the 1979 Pan American Games – Women's 800 metres =

Women's 800 metres at the 1979 Pan American Games
- Venue: Estadio Sixto Escobar
- Dates: 8 & 9 July
- Winning time: 2:01.2

Medalists
Gold medal	Essie Kelley	United States
Silver medal	Julie Brown	United States
Bronze medal	Aurelia Pentón	Cuba

The women's 800 metres sprint competition of the athletics events at the 1979 Pan American Games took place on 8 and 9 July at the Estadio Sixto Escobar. The defending Pan American Games champion was Kathy Weston of the United States.

== Records ==
Prior to this competition, the existing world and Pan American Games records were as follows:

World record	Tatyana Kazankina (URS)	1:54.94	Montreal, Canada	July 26, 1976
Pan American Games record	Madeline Manning (USA)	2:02.3	Winnipeg, Canada	1967

== Results ==
All times shown are in minutes and seconds.

KEY:	WR	World Record	GR	Pan American Record

=== Heats ===
Rank	Heat	Name	Nationality	Time	Notes
1	1	Julie Brown	United States	2:06.1	Q
2	1	Anne Morelli	Canada	2:06.2	Q
3	1	Alejandra Ramos	Chile	2:06.6	Q
4	1	Nery McKeen	Cuba	2:07.0	q
5	2	Aurelia Pentón	Cuba	2:08.9	Q
6	2	Essie Kelley	United States	2:09.2	Q
7	1	Soraya Vieira	Brazil	2:09.3	q
7	2	Brit Lind	Canada	2:09.3	Q
9	2	Helen Blake	Jamaica	2:10.2	
10	2	Margit Weise	Brazil	2:13.8	
11	2	Marcela López	Argentina	2:14.3	
12	2	Ileana Hocking	Puerto Rico	2:16.8	
13	1	Eugenia Ponce	Honduras	2:33.9	
	1	Angelita Lind	Puerto Rico	DNS	

=== Final ===
Rank	Name	Nationality	Time	Notes
1st place, gold medalist(s)	Essie Kelley	United States	2:01.2	GR
2nd place, silver medalist(s)	Julie Brown	United States	2:01.2	
3rd place, bronze medalist(s)	Aurelia Pentón	Cuba	2:02.1	
4	Anne Morelli	Canada	2:03.0	
5	Nery McKeen	Cuba	2:05.4	
6	Alejandra Ramos	Chile	2:06.2	
7	Brit Lind	Canada	2:06.7	
8	Soraya Vieira	Brazil	2:07.3	NR
