= Athletics at the 1979 Pan American Games – Women's 1500 metres =

Women's 1500 metres at the 1979 Pan American Games
- Venue: Estadio Sixto Escobar
- Dates: 13 July
- Winning time: 4:05.7

Medalists
Gold medal	Mary Decker	United States
Silver medal	Julie Brown	United States
Bronze medal	Penny Werthner	Canada

The women's 1500 metres sprint competition of the athletics events at the 1979 Pan American Games took place on 13 July at the Estadio Sixto Escobar. The defending Pan American Games champion was Jan Merrill of the United States.

== Records ==
Prior to this competition, the existing world and Pan American Games records were as follows:

World record	Tatyana Kazankina (URS)	3:56.0	Podolsk, Soviet Union	June 28, 1976
Pan American Games record	Jan Merrill (USA)	4:18.32	Mexico City, Mexico	1975

== Results ==
All times are in minutes and seconds.

KEY:	WR	World Record	GR	Pan American Record

=== Final ===
Rank	Name	Nationality	Time	Notes
1st place, gold medalist(s)	Mary Decker	United States	4:05.7	GR
2nd place, silver medalist(s)	Julie Brown	United States	4:06.4	
3rd place, bronze medalist(s)	Penny Werthner	Canada	4:14.8	
4	Francine Gendron	Canada	4:15.0	
5	Alejandra Ramos	Chile	4:24.8	
6	Ileana Hocking	Puerto Rico	4:27.3	
7	Soraya Vieira	Brazil	4:30.2	
8	Carmen Garduño	Mexico	4:40.4	
9	Angelita Lind	Puerto Rico	4:40.9	
10	Norma Franco	El Salvador	5:02.7	
11	Edith Rodríguez	Honduras	5:19.1	
