= Athletics at the 1985 Summer Universiade – Women's 400 metres hurdles =

The women's 400 metres hurdles event at the 1985 Summer Universiade was held at the Kobe Universiade Memorial Stadium in Kobe on 29 and 30 August 1985.

== Medalists ==
Gold	Silver	Bronze
Margarita Navickaitė; Soviet Union	Cristieana Cojocaru; Romania	Nawal El Moutawakel; Morocco

== Results ==
=== Heats ===
Rank	Heat	Athlete	Nationality	Time	Notes
1	1	Margarita Navickaitė	Soviet Union	56.38	Q
2	1	Maria Usifo	Nigeria	57.64	Q
3	1	Giuseppina Cirulli	Italy	58.07	
4	1	Gwen Wall	Canada	58.51	
5	1	Erika Szopori	Hungary	58.91	
6	1	Reiko Yamamoto	Japan	1:01.39	
1	2	Jolanta Stalmach	Poland	56.30	Q
2	2	LaTanya Sheffield	United States	56.55	Q
3	2	Nawal El Moutawakel	Morocco	56.57	q
4	2	Nicoleta Vornicu	Romania	56.70	q
5	2	Dana Wright	Canada	1:00.36	
6	2	Zhang Fengqin	China	1:02.55	
1	3	Cristieana Cojocaru	Romania	55.90	Q
2	3	Schowonda Williams	United States	5?.??	Q
3	3	Irmgard Trojer	Italy	58.89	
4	3	Hélène Huart	France	59.02	
5	3	Yoko Sato	Japan	59.32	

=== Final ===
Rank	Athlete	Nationality	Time	Notes
1st place, gold medalist(s)	Margarita Navickaitė	Soviet Union	55.33	
2nd place, silver medalist(s)	Cristieana Cojocaru	Romania	55.44	
3rd place, bronze medalist(s)	Nawal El Moutawakel	Morocco	55.59	
4	Jolanta Stalmach	Poland	55.89	
5	Nicoleta Vornicu	Romania	56.36	
6	Schowonda Williams	United States	56.91	
7	LaTanya Sheffield	United States	57.30	
8	Maria Usifo	Nigeria	59.24	
