= Margit Weise =

Retired Brazilian athlete (born 1960)

Personal information
- Born: 20 November 1960 (age 64) Rio do Sul, Brazil

Sport
- Sport: Athletics
- Event(s): 800 m, 400 m hurdles

Margit Weise (born 20 November 1960) is a retired Brazilian athlete who specialised in the 800 metres and 400 metres hurdles. She won several medals on continental levels. In addition, she represented her country at two editions of Pan American Games. She later worked as an athletics coach.

== International competitions ==
Year	Competition	Venue	Position	Event	Notes
Representing Brazil
1978	South American Junior Championships	São Paulo, Brazil	5th	400 m	57.9
1978	South American Junior Championships	São Paulo, Brazil	2nd	800 m	2:13.0
1979	Pan American Games	San Juan, Puerto Rico	10th (h)	800 m	2:13.8
1979	Pan American Games	San Juan, Puerto Rico	4th	4 × 400 m relay	3:45.7
1983	Pan American Games	Caracas, Venezuela	10th (h)	400 m hurdles	61.44
1983	South American Championships	Santa Fe, Argentina	2nd	400 m hurdles	60.5
1983	South American Championships	Santa Fe, Argentina	1st	4 × 400 m relay	3:40.0
1987	South American Championships	São Paulo, Brazil	6th	100 m hurdles	15.38
1987	South American Championships	São Paulo, Brazil	3rd	400 m hurdles	60.05
1995	South American Championships	Manaus, Brazil	4th	Triple jump	12.13 m
