= Athletics at the 1982 Commonwealth Games – Women's 400 metres hurdles =

Women's 400 metres hurdles at the Commonwealth Games

The women's 400 metres hurdles event at the 1982 Commonwealth Games was held on 5 and 7 October at the QE II Stadium in Brisbane, Australia. It was the first time that women competed in this event at the Commonwealth Games.

== Medalists ==
| Gold | Silver | Bronze |
|---|---|---|
| Debbie Flintoff; Australia | Ruth Kyalisima; Uganda | Yvette Wray; England |

== Results ==
=== Heats ===
Qualification: First 4 in each heat (Q) and the next 1 fastest (q) qualify for the final.

| Rank | Heat | Name | Nationality | Time | Notes |
|---|---|---|---|---|---|
| 1 | 1 | Debbie Flintoff | Australia | 57.44 | Q, GR |
| 2 | 1 | Ruth Kyalisima | Uganda | 58.22 | Q |
| 3 | 2 | Lyn Foreman | Australia | 58.69 | Q |
| 4 | 1 | Yvette Wray | England | 59.00 | Q |
| 5 | 2 | Andrea Page | Canada | 59.22 | Q |
| 6 | 1 | Margaret Southerden | Scotland | 59.48 | Q |
| 7 | 1 | Gwen Wall | Canada | 59.92 | q |
| 7 | 2 | Sue Morley | England | 59.92 | Q |
| 9 | 2 | Sandra Farmer | Jamaica | 1:00.06 | Q |
| 10 | 1 | Terry Genge | New Zealand | 1:00.18 | |
| 11 | 1 | Diane Fryar | Wales | 1:00.50 | |
| 12 | 2 | Janine Robson | New Zealand | 1:01.17 | |
| 13 | 2 | Dionne Wright | Canada | 1:01.19 | |
| 14 | 2 | Sarah Owen | Wales | 1:02.84 | |
| | 1 | June Caddle | Barbados | DNF | |
| | 1 | Verona Elder | England | DNF | |
| | 2 | Rose Tata-Muya | Kenya | DNF | |

=== Final ===
| Rank | Lane | Name | Nationality | Time | Notes |
|---|---|---|---|---|---|
| 1st place, gold medalist(s) | 5 | Debbie Flintoff | Australia | 55.89 | GR |
| 2nd place, silver medalist(s) | 8 | Ruth Kyalisima | Uganda | 57.10 | |
| 3rd place, bronze medalist(s) | 2 | Yvette Wray | England | 57.17 | |
| 4 | 3 | Sue Morley | England | 57.57 | |
| 5 | 6 | Lyn Foreman | Australia | 57.62 | |
| 6 | 1 | Andrea Page | Canada | 57.70 | |
| 7 | 9 | Margaret Southerden | Scotland | 58.36 | |
| 8 | 7 | Gwen Wall | Canada | 58.49 | |
| 9 | 4 | Sandra Farmer | Jamaica | 59.07 | |
