= Athletics at the 1983 Pan American Games – Women's 400 metres =

Women's 400 metres at the Pan American Games

The women's 400 metres event at the 1983 Pan American Games was held in Caracas, Venezuela on 26 and 27 August.

== Medalists ==
Gold	Silver	Bronze
Charmaine Crooks; Canada	Ana Fidelia Quirot; Cuba	Easter Gabriel; United States

== Results ==
=== Heats ===
Rank	Heat	Name	Nationality	Time	Notes
1	1	Ana Fidelia Quirot	Cuba	51.94	Q
2	2	Charmaine Crooks	Canada	52.25	Q
3	2	Mercedes Álvarez	Cuba	52.75	Q
4	2	June Griffith	Guyana	52.98	Q
5	1	Cathy Rattray	Jamaica	53.19	Q
6	2	Eucaris Caicedo	Colombia	53.54	q
7	2	Jocelyn Joseph	Antigua and Barbuda	54.40	q
8	1	Easter Gabriel	United States	53.69	Q
9	2	Gail Emmanuel	Trinidad and Tobago	54.46	
10	1	Yolanda Small	Trinidad and Tobago	54.89	
11	1	Iyiechia Petrus	United States Virgin Islands	55.32	
12	1	Margarita Grun	Uruguay	57.53	
13	1	Terry Juliens	Antigua and Barbuda	1:00.28	
	2	Kelia Bolton	United States	DNS	

=== Final ===
Rank	Name	Nationality	Time	Notes
1st place, gold medalist(s)	Charmaine Crooks	Canada	51.49	GR
2nd place, silver medalist(s)	Ana Fidelia Quirot	Cuba	51.83	
3rd place, bronze medalist(s)	Easter Gabriel	United States	52.45	
4	Cathy Rattray	Jamaica	52.91	
5	June Griffith	Guyana	53.14	
6	Mercedes Álvarez	Cuba	53.25	
7	Eucaris Caicedo	Colombia	53.73	
	Jocelyn Joseph	Antigua and Barbuda	?	
