= Athletics at the 1979 Pan American Games – Men's long jump =

Men's long jump at the 1979 Pan American Games
- Venue: Estadio Sixto Escobar
- Dates: 7 July
- Winning distance: 8.18

Medalists
Gold medal	João Carlos de Oliveira	Brazil
Silver medal	David Giralt	Cuba
Bronze medal	Carl Lewis	United States

The men's long jump competition of the athletics events at the 1979 Pan American Games took place on 7 July at the Estadio Sixto Escobar. The defending Pan American Games champion was João Carlos de Oliveira of Brazil.

== Records ==
Prior to this competition, the existing world and Pan American Games records were as follows:

World record	Nenad Stekić (YUG)	8.45	Montreal, Canada	July 25, 1975
Pan American Games record	Ralph Boston (USA)	8.29	Winnipeg, Canada	1967

== Results ==
All distances shown are in meters.

KEY:	WR	World Record	GR	Pan American Record

=== Final ===
Rank	Name	Nationality	Distance	Notes
1st place, gold medalist(s)	João Carlos de Oliveira	Brazil	8.18	
2nd place, silver medalist(s)	David Giralt	Cuba	8.15	
3rd place, bronze medalist(s)	Carl Lewis	United States	8.13	
4	Altevir de Araújo	Brazil	7.73	
5	Ray Quiñones	Puerto Rico	7.52	
6	Richard Rock	Canada	7.31	
7	Agustín Neuland	Cuba	7.31	
8	Calvin Greenaway	Antigua and Barbuda	6.85	
	Larry Myricks	United States	DNS	
	Dennis Trott	Bermuda	DNS	
	Wilfredo Almonte	Dominican Republic	DNS	
	Cornelius Everton	Antigua and Barbuda	DNS	
	Steve Hanna	Bahamas	DNS	
	Ronald Chambers	Jamaica	DNS	
	Alejandro Cardona	Puerto Rico	DNS	
	Edgar Moreno	Venezuela	DNS	
	José Salazar	Venezuela	DNS	
