= Athletics at the 1981 Summer Universiade – Women's 100 metres =

Women's Athletic Universiade

The women's 100 metres event at the 1981 Summer Universiade was held at the Stadionul Naţional in Bucharest, Romania, on 21 and 22 July 1981.

== Medalists ==
Gold	Silver	Bronze
Bev Goddard; Great Britain	Olga Zolotaryova; Soviet Union	Olga Nasonova; Soviet Union

== Results ==
=== Heats ===
Held on 21 July

Wind:
Heat 3: -2.8 m/s, Heat 4: -0.5 m/s

Rank	Heat	Athlete	Nationality	Time	Notes
1	2	Olga Nasonova	Soviet Union	11.60	Q
1	3	Bev Goddard	Great Britain	11.60	Q
3	1	Olga Zolotaryova	Soviet Union	11.64	Q
4	2	Michelle Glover	United States	11.72	Q
5	3	Sheila de Oliveira	Brazil	11.80	Q
6	1	Jackie Washington	United States	11.82	Q
7	3	Marie Mathieu	Puerto Rico	11.89	Q
8	4	Luisa Ferrer	Cuba	11.90	Q
9	2	Dijana Ištvanović	Yugoslavia	11.91	Q
10	4	Lena Möller	Sweden	11.93	Q
11	4	Carla Mercurio	Italy	11.95	Q
12	3	Doina Ciolan	Romania	12.08	q
13	4	Nawal El Moutawakel	Morocco	12.09	q
14	4	Leanne Evans	Australia	12.10	q
15	1	Piroska Hracs	Hungary	12.15	Q
16	4	Niculina Chiricuţă	Romania	12.18	q
17	3	Laurence Beckles	France	12.20	
18	3	Antonella Capriotti	Italy	12.49	
19	2	Dolores Vives	Spain	12.54	
20	1	Ke Jinxia	China	12.71	
21	1	Fosa Ibini	Nigeria	12.73	
22	4	Elizabeth Mokogwu	Nigeria	12.83	
23	2	Mirna Aoudi	Lebanon	13.25	
24	3	Dia Toutingi	Syria	13.42	
25	1	May Sardouk	Lebanon	13.51	

=== Semifinals ===
Held on 22 July

Rank	Heat	Athlete	Nationality	Time	Notes
1	2	Bev Goddard	Great Britain	11.40	Q
2	1	Michelle Glover	United States	11.54	Q
2	2	Jackie Washington	United States	11.54	Q
4	2	Olga Zolotaryova	Soviet Union	11.56	Q
5	1	Sheila de Oliveira	Brazil	11.75	Q
5	1	Olga Nasonova	Soviet Union	11.75	Q
5	2	Carla Mercurio	Italy	11.75	q
8	2	Marie Mathieu	Puerto Rico	11.76	q
9	1	Luisa Ferrer	Cuba	11.78	
10	1	Dijana Ištvanović	Yugoslavia	11.90	
11	2	Lena Möller	Sweden	11.94	
12	2	Piroska Hrács	Hungary	12.00	
13	1	Doina Ciolan	Romania	12.04	
14	2	Niculina Chiricuţă	Romania	12.15	
15	1	Nawal El Moutawakel	Morocco	12.18	
	1	Leanne Evans	Australia	DNS	

=== Final ===
Held on 22 July

Wind: -0.7 m/s

Rank	Athlete	Nationality	Time	Notes
1st place, gold medalist(s)	Bev Goddard	Great Britain	11.35	
2nd place, silver medalist(s)	Olga Zolotaryova	Soviet Union	11.51	
3rd place, bronze medalist(s)	Olga Nasonova	Soviet Union	11.54	
4	Michelle Glover	United States	11.55	
5	Jackie Washington	United States	11.68	
6	Marie Mathieu	Puerto Rico	11.76	
7	Sheila de Oliveira	Brazil	11.80	
8	Carla Mercurio	Italy	11.89	
