= Eucaris Caicedo =

Personal information
- Born: 26 March 1956

Sport
- Sport: Athletics
- Events: 200 metres; 400 metres; 800 metres

Eucaris Caicedo (born 26 March 1956) is a retired Colombian athlete who competed over a range of distances from the 200 to the 800 metres. She represented her country at the 1983 World Championships in Helsinki.

== International competitions ==
Year	Competition	Venue	Position	Event	Notes
Representing Colombia
1972	South American Junior Championships	Lima, Peru	10th (h)	100 m	13.0
1972	South American Junior Championships	Lima, Peru	10th (h)	200 m	27.5
1972	South American Junior Championships	Lima, Peru	4th	400 m	61.4
1972	South American Junior Championships	Lima, Peru	6th	4 × 400 m relay	4:43.5
1974	Central American and Caribbean Games	Santo Domingo, Dominican Republic	5th	400 m	55.43
1974	Central American and Caribbean Games	Santo Domingo, Dominican Republic	7th	800 m	2:15.32
1974	South American Championships	Santiago, Chile	5th	200 m	25.0
1974	South American Championships	Santiago, Chile	1st	400 m	56.1
1974	South American Championships	Santiago, Chile	6th	800 m	2:20.1
1974	South American Junior Championships	Lima, Peru	3rd	200 m	24.9
1974	South American Junior Championships	Lima, Peru	1st	400 m	55.3
1974	South American Junior Championships	Lima, Peru	6th	4 × 100 m relay	49.7
1974	South American Junior Championships	Lima, Peru	3rd	4 × 400 m relay	4:01.4
1977	Bolivarian Games	La Paz, Bolivia	1st	200 m	24.10
1977	Bolivarian Games	La Paz, Bolivia	1st	400 m	54.76
1977	Bolivarian Games	La Paz, Bolivia	2nd	4 × 400 m relay	4:01.1
1977	South American Championships	Montevideo, Uruguay	1st	400 m	55.3
1977	South American Championships	Montevideo, Uruguay	6th	4 × 100 m relay	48.6
1977	South American Championships	Montevideo, Uruguay	5th	4 × 400 m relay	4:00.6
1981	Central American and Caribbean Championships	Santo Domingo, Dominican Republic	3rd	200 m	24.15
1981	Central American and Caribbean Championships	Santo Domingo, Dominican Republic	3rd	400 m	53.93
1981	South American Championships	La Paz, Bolivia	1st	200 m	23.6
1981	South American Championships	La Paz, Bolivia	1st	400 m	53.6
1981	Bolivarian Games	Barquisimeto, Venezuela	1st	200 m	24.10
1981	Bolivarian Games	Barquisimeto, Venezuela	1st	400 m	53.64
1981	Bolivarian Games	Barquisimeto, Venezuela	1st	4 × 100 m relay	45.8
1981	Bolivarian Games	Barquisimeto, Venezuela	1st	4 × 400 m relay	3:44.38
1982	Southern Cross Games	Santa Fe, Argentina	1st	200 m	24.48
1982	Southern Cross Games	Santa Fe, Argentina	1st	400 m	54.21
1982	Southern Cross Games	Santa Fe, Argentina	3rd	4 × 100 m relay	49.3
1983	World Championships	Helsinki, Finland	21st (h)	400 m	55.09^{1}
1983	World Championships	Helsinki, Finland	18th (h)	800 m	2:17.06
1983	Pan American Games	Caracas, Venezuela	7th	400 m	53.73
1983	Pan American Games	Caracas, Venezuela	9th (h)	800 m	2:07.63

^{1}Did not start in the quarterfinals
