= Omar Ortega =

Argentine middle-distance runner

Personal information
- Full name: Omar Esteban Ortega
- Nationality: Argentine
- Born: 13 December 1960 (age 65) Buenos Aires
- Height: 1.83 m (6 ft 0 in)
- Weight: 70 kg (154 lb)

Sport
- Country: Argentina
- Sport: Middle-distance running

Omar Esteban Ortega is an Argentine Olympic middle-distance runner. He represented his country in the men's 1500 meters at the 1984 Summer Olympics. His time was a DNF in the first heat.

== International competitions ==
Year	Competition	Venue	Position	Event	Notes
Representing Argentina
1978	South American Junior Championships	São Paulo, Brazil	5th	800 m	1:54.3
1978	South American Junior Championships	São Paulo, Brazil	2nd	1500 m	3:59.2
1979	South American Championships	Bucaramanga, Colombia	5th	1500 m	3:49.8
1982	Southern Cross Games	Santa Fe, Argentina	6th	1500 m	3:54.77
1982	Southern Cross Games	Santa Fe, Argentina	3rd	5000 m	14:10.1
1983	Pan American Games	Caracas, Venezuela	5th	1500 m	3:47.03
1983	South American Championships	Santa Fe, Argentina	2nd	1500 m	3:48.9
1984	Olympic Games	Los Angeles, United States	–	1500 m	DNF

== Personal bests ==
Outdoor

- 800 metres – 1:48.78 (Madrid 1983)
- 1500 metres – 3:40.8 (Stanford 1984) former NR
- One mile – 4:02.45 (Boise 1984) former NR
- 3000 metres – 8:04.60 (Lausanne 1983) former NR
- 5000 metres – 14:03.94 (Pullman 1984)
- 10,000 metres – 29:49.82 (Santiago 1983)
- 3000 metres steeplechase – 8:53.8 (Corvallis 1981)

Indoor

- 1500 metres – 3:44.9 (oversized track, Moscow, USA 1984)
- 3000 metres – 8:05.0 (Pullman 1983)
