= Athletics at the 1967 Summer Universiade – Women's pentathlon =

The women's pentathlon event at the 1967 Summer Universiade was held at the National Olympic Stadium in Tokyo on 31 August and 1 September 1967.

== Results ==
Rank	Athlete	Nationality	80m H	SP	HJ	LJ	200m	Points	Notes
1st place, gold medalist(s)	Liese Prokop	Austria	11.9	12.77	1.67	5.42	26.6	4465	
2nd place, silver medalist(s)	Michiko Okamoto	Japan						4355	
3rd place, bronze medalist(s)	Pirkko Heikkilä	Finland						4274	
4	Ryoko Yoshida	Japan						4111	
5	Helga Kriess	West Germany						4071	
6	Ruth Martin-Jones	Great Britain						3788	
7	Anna Hsu	Hong Kong						3618	
