= Athletics at the Friendship Games – Women's 400 metres hurdles =

The women's 400 metres hurdles event at the Friendship Games was held on 16 and 17 August 1984 at the Evžen Rošický Stadium in Prague, Czechoslovakia.

== Medalists ==
Gold	Silver	Bronze
Marina Stepanova; Soviet Union	Yekaterina Fesenko-Grun; Soviet Union	Margarita Ponomaryova; Soviet Union

== Results ==
=== Heats ===
Rank	Heat	Name	Nationality	Time	Notes
1	2	Marina Stepanova	Soviet Union	54.83	Q
2	2	Margarita Ponomaryova	Soviet Union	55.54	Q
3	1	Yekaterina Fesenko-Grun	Soviet Union	56.32	Q
4	1	Genowefa Błaszak	Poland	56.73	Q
5	2	Nadezhda Asenova	Bulgaria	57.06	Q
6	1	Radostina Shtereva	Bulgaria	57.32	Q
7	2	Erika Szopori	Hungary	57.56	q
8	2	Anna Filičková	Czechoslovakia	57.96	q
9	1	Gerda Haas	Austria	58.99	
10	1	Eva Eibnerová	Czechoslovakia	59.27	
11	1	W. Griffiths	Great Britain	59.52	

=== Final ===
Rank	Name	Nationality	Time	Notes
1st place, gold medalist(s)	Marina Stepanova	Soviet Union	53.67	
2nd place, silver medalist(s)	Yekaterina Fesenko-Grun	Soviet Union	54.42	
3rd place, bronze medalist(s)	Margarita Ponomaryova	Soviet Union	54.65	
4	Genowefa Błaszak	Poland	55.35	
5	Radostina Shtereva	Bulgaria	56.98	
6	Nadezhda Asenova	Bulgaria	56.98	
7	Erika Szopori	Hungary	57.18	
8	Anna Filičková	Czechoslovakia	57.99	

== See also ==
- Athletics at the 1984 Summer Olympics – Women's 400 metres hurdles
