= Athletics at the 1984 Summer Olympics – Women's 400 metres hurdles =

Women's 400 metres hurdles at the Games of the XXIII Olympiad
- Venue: Los Angeles Memorial Coliseum
- Dates: 5 August 1984 (heats); 6 August 1984 (semi-finals); 8 August 1984 (final)
- Competitors: 26 from 20 nations
- Winning time: 54.61 OR

Medalists
1st place, gold medalist(s)		Nawal El Moutawakel; Morocco
2nd place, silver medalist(s)		Judi Brown; United States
3rd place, bronze medalist(s)		Cristieana Cojocaru; Romania

Official Video Highlights

The Women's 400 metres hurdles at the 1984 Summer Olympics in Los Angeles, California, United States, had an entry list of 26 competitors, with four qualifying heats (26 runners) and two semifinals (16) before the final (8) took place on 8 August 1984. The event made its Olympic debut at these games.

== Medalists ==
Gold	Nawal El Moutawakel; Morocco
Silver	Judi Brown; United States
Bronze	Cristieana Cojocaru; Romania

== Abbreviations ==
Q	automatic qualification
q	qualification by rank
DNS	did not start
NM	no mark
OR	olympic record
WR	world record
AR	area record
NR	national record
PB	personal best
SB	season best

== Final ==
RANK	FINAL	TIME
	Nawal El Moutawakel (MAR)	54.61
	Judi Brown (USA)	55.20
	Cristieana Cojocaru (ROU)	55.41
4.	P. T. Usha (IND)	55.42
5.	Ann-Louise Skoglund (SWE)	55.43
6.	Debbie Flintoff (AUS)	56.21
7.	Tuija Helander (FIN)	56.55
8.	Sandra Farmer (JAM)	57.15

== Semi-finals ==
RANK	HEAT 1	TIME
1.	Ann-Louise Skoglund (SWE)	55.17
2.	Cristieana Cojocaru (ROU)	55.24
3.	Nawal El Moutawakel (MAR)	55.65
4.	Sandra Farmer (JAM)	56.05
5.	Sharrieffa Barksdale (USA)	56.19
6.	Giuseppina Cirulli (ITA)	56.45
7.	Susan Morley (GBR)	56.67
8.	Andrea Page (CAN)	57.89

RANK	HEAT 2	TIME
1.	P. T. Usha (IND)	55.94
2.	Judi Brown (USA)	55.97
3.	Debbie Flintoff (AUS)	56.24
4.	Tuija Helander (FIN)	56.59
5.	Gladys Taylor (GBR)	56.72
6.	Olga Commandeur (NED)	57.01
7.	Ruth Kyalisima (UGA)	57.02 (NR)
8.	Maria Usifo (NGR)	58.55

== Qualifying heats ==
RANK	HEAT 1	TIME
1.	Judi Brown (USA)	55.97
2.	P. T. Usha (IND)	56.81
3.	Debbie Flintoff (AUS)	57.20
4.	Tuija Helander (FIN)	57.22
5.	Lai Lee-chiao (TPE)	58.54
6.	Alma Vázquez (MEX)	1:00.86

RANK	HEAT 2	TIME
1.	Nawal El Moutawakel (MAR)	56.49
2.	Sharrieffa Barksdale (USA)	56.89
3.	Sandra Farmer (JAM)	57.06
4.	Gladys Taylor (GBR)	57.64
5.	Lyn Grime (NZL)	58.02
6.	Dana Wright (CAN)	58.17

RANK	HEAT 3	TIME
1.	Olga Commandeur (NED)	56.67
2.	Cristieana Cojocaru (ROU)	56.94
3.	Ruth Kyalisima (UGA)	57.38
4.	Giuseppina Cirulli (ITA)	57.49
5.	Overill Dwyer-Brown (JAM)	58.42
6.	Angela Wright-Scott (USA)	59.77
7.	Agripina de la Cruz (PHI)	1:02.70

RANK	HEAT 4	TIME
1.	Ann-Louise Skoglund (SWE)	55.75
2.	Maria Usifo (NGR)	57.78
3.	Susan Morley (GBR)	58.71
4.	Andrea Page (CAN)	59.09
5.	M. D. Valsamma (IND)	1:00.03
6.	Cheryl Blackman (BAR)	1:01.19
7.	Mary Parr (IRL)	1:01.66

== See also ==
- 1982 Women's European Championships 400m Hurdles (Athens)
- 1983 Women's World Championships 400m Hurdles (Helsinki)
- 1984 Women's Friendship Games 400m Hurdles (Prague)
- 1986 Women's European Championships 400m Hurdles (Stuttgart)
- 1987 Women's World Championships 400m Hurdles (Rome)
- 1988 Women's Olympic 400m Hurdles (Seoul)
