= Athletics at the 1981 Summer Universiade – Women's 400 metres hurdles =

The women's 400 metres hurdles event at the 1981 Summer Universiade was held at the Stadionul Naţional in Bucharest on 24 and 25 July 1981. It was the first time that this event was contested by women at the Universiade.

== Medalists ==
Gold	Silver	Bronze
Anna Kastyetskaya; Soviet Union	Birgit Sonntag; East Germany	Tatyana Zubova; Soviet Union

== Results ==
=== Heats ===
Rank	Heat	Athlete	Nationality	Time	Notes
1	1	Anna Kastyetskaya	Soviet Union	56.24	Q
2	2	Anne Michel	Belgium	57.16	Q
3	1	Birgit Sonntag	East Germany	57.29	Q
4	2	Tatyana Zubova	Soviet Union	57.63	Q
5	1	Cristina Cojocaru	Romania	57.67	Q
5	2	Yvette Wray	Great Britain	57.67	Q
7	1	Giuseppina Cirulli	Italy	57.80	q
8	1	Tammy Ettenne	United States	58.18	q
9	2	Patrizia Lombardo	Italy	59.05	
10	2	Kirsi Ulvinem	Sweden	59.53	
11	1	Esther Kaufmann	Switzerland	1:00.06	

=== Final ===
Rank	Athlete	Nationality	Time	Notes
1st place, gold medalist(s)	Anna Kastyetskaya	Soviet Union	55.52	
2nd place, silver medalist(s)	Birgit Sonntag	East Germany	55.90	
3rd place, bronze medalist(s)	Tatyana Zubova	Soviet Union	57.07	
4	Anne Michel	Belgium	57.57	
5	Yvette Wray	Great Britain	57.62	
6	Giuseppina Cirulli	Italy	57.77	
7	Cristina Cojocaru	Romania	58.64	
8	Tammy Ettenne	United States	58.90	
