= Athletics at the 1977 Summer Universiade – Men's long jump =

The men's long jump event at the 1977 Summer Universiade was held at the Vasil Levski National Stadium in Sofia on 20 and 21 August.

== Medalists ==
Gold	Silver	Bronze
Nenad Stekić; Yugoslavia	Grzegorz Cybulski; Poland	David Giralt; Cuba

== Results ==
=== Qualification ===
Rank	Group	Athlete	Nationality	Result	Notes
1	?	Frédéric Charles	France	7.75	
2	?	Nenad Stekić	Yugoslavia	7.72	
2	?	Vladimir Tsepelyov	Soviet Union	7.72	
4	?	David Giralt	Cuba	7.71	
5	?	Grzegorz Cybulski	Poland	7.69	
6	?	Richard Rock	Canada	7.68	
7	?	Philippe Deroche	France	7.65	
8	?	Stefan Lazarescu	Romania	7.60	
9	?	Aleksey Pereverzev	Soviet Union	7.58	
10	?	Dumitru Iordache	Romania	7.48	
11	?	Hans-Jürgen Berger	West Germany	7.46	
12	?	Alberto Solanas	Spain	7.45	
13	?	Larry Doubley	United States	7.44	
14	?	Leszek Dunecki	Poland	7.42	
15	?	Maurizio Siega	Italy	7.24	
16	?	Youssef Khemiri	Tunisia	7.22	
17	?	Jaroslav Prišcák	Czechoslovakia	7.20	
18	?	Jürgen Lichtenberg	West Germany	6.91	
19	?	Ziyad Kat	Syria	6.89	
20	?	Victoro Moredge	Nigeria	6.78	
21	?	Jim Wadda	Gambia	6.65	
22	?	Emilio Benekov	Bulgaria	5.52	
	?	Don Commons	Australia	NM	

=== Final ===
Rank	Athlete	Nationality	Result	Notes
1st place, gold medalist(s)	Nenad Stekić	Yugoslavia	7.97	
2nd place, silver medalist(s)	Grzegorz Cybulski	Poland	7.95	
3rd place, bronze medalist(s)	David Giralt	Cuba	7.92	
4	Philippe Deroche	France	7.87	
5	Aleksey Pereverzev	Soviet Union	7.82	
6	Dumitru Iordache	Romania	7.82	
7	Vladimir Tsepelyov	Soviet Union	7.80	
8	Richard Rock	Canada	7.67	
9	Frédéric Charles	France	7.58	
10	Hans-Jürgen Berger	West Germany	7.41	
11	Alberto Solanas	Spain	5.35	
	Stefan Lazarescu	Romania	NM	
