= Athletics at the 1979 Pan American Games – Women's 4 × 400 metres relay =

Women's 4 × 400 metres relay at the 1979 Pan American Games
- Venue: Estadio Sixto Escobar
- Dates: 14 July
- Winning time: 3:29.4

Medalists
Gold medal	Rosalyn Bryant, Sharon Dabney, Patricia Jackson, Essie Kelley	United States
Silver medal	Ana Luisa Guibert, Nery McKeen, Aurelia Pentón, Ana Fidelia Quirot	Cuba
Bronze medal	Anne Mackie-Morelli, Marita Payne, Micheline Racette, Jeanette Wood	Canada

The women's 4 × 400 metres relay competition of the athletics events at the 1979 Pan American Games took place on 14 July at the Estadio Sixto Escobar. The defending Pan American Games champion was the Canadian team.

== Records ==
Prior to this competition, the existing world and Pan American Games records were as follows:

World record	East Germany	3:19.23	Montreal, Canada	July 31, 1976
Pan American Games record	Canada	3:30.36	Mexico City, Mexico	1975

== Results ==
All times shown are in minutes and seconds.

KEY:	WR	World Record	GR	Pan American Record

=== Final ===
Rank	Nation	Competitors	Time	Notes
1st place, gold medalist(s)	United States	Sharon Dabney, Patricia Jackson, Rosalyn Bryant, Essie Kelley	3:29.4	GR
2nd place, silver medalist(s)	Cuba	Ana Fidelia Quirot, Nery McKeen, Ana Luisa Guibert, Aurelia Pentón	3:36.3	
3rd place, bronze medalist(s)	Canada	Micheline Racette, Marita Payne, Jeanette Wood, Anne Mackie-Morelli	3:37.6	
4	Brazil	Tânia Miranda, Margit Weise, Sueli Machado, Joyce dos Santos	3:45.7	
5	Puerto Rico	Georgina López, Nilsa Paris, Ileana Hocking, Angelita Lind	3:49.4	
