= Athletics at the 1981 Summer Universiade – Women's 200 metres =

The women's 200 metres event at the 1981 Summer Universiade was held at the Stadionul Naţional in Bucharest on 23, 24 and 25 July 1981.

== Medalists ==
Gold	Silver	Bronze
Kathy Smallwood; Great Britain	Marisa Masullo; Italy	Irina Nazarova; Soviet Union

== Results ==
=== Heats ===
Wind:
Heat 1: +1.0 m/s, Heat 2: +1.6 m/s, Heat 3: +1.7 m/s, Heat 4: +0.8 m/s

Rank	Heat	Athlete	Nationality	Time	Notes
1	1	Kerstin Walther	East Germany	23.34	Q
2	2	Kathy Smallwood	Great Britain	23.39	Q
3	3	Irina Nazarova	Soviet Union	23.41	Q
4	2	Olga Korotkova	Soviet Union	23.50	Q
5	4	Marisa Masullo	Italy	23.57	Q
6	3	Carla Mercurio	Italy	23.65	Q
7	4	Sylvie Revaux	France	23.66	Q
8	3	Lena Möller	Sweden	23.70	Q
9	2	Marie Mathieu	Puerto Rico	23.71	Q
10	3	Piroska Hracs	Hungary	23.81	q
11	1	Dijana Ištvanović	Yugoslavia	24.00	Q
11	4	Sheila de Oliveira	Brazil	24.00	Q
13	3	Leanne Evans	Australia	24.03	q
14	4	Luisa Ferrer	Cuba	24.04	q
15	2	Steluța Vintila	Romania	24.11	q
16	4	Nawal El Moutawakel	Morocco	24.23	
17	1	Claudine Mas	France	24.31	Q
18	4	Kelia Bolton	United States	24.52	
19	1	Niculina Chiricuţă	Romania	24.68	
20	1	Elizabeth Mokogwu	Nigeria	25.09	
21	3	Dolores Vives	Spain	25.45	
22	2	Fosa Ibini	Nigeria	25.75	
23	3	Yvonne Nelson	Guyana	26.50	
24	4	Mirna Aoudi	Lebanon	27.23	
25	1	May Sardouk	Lebanon	27.82	

=== Semifinals ===
Wind:
Heat 1: ? m/s, Heat 2: ? m/s

Rank	Heat	Athlete	Nationality	Time	Notes
1	2	Kathy Smallwood	Great Britain	23.32	Q
2	1	Marisa Masullo	Italy	23.33	Q
3	2	Irina Nazarova	Soviet Union	23.56	Q
4	2	Luisa Ferrer	Cuba	23.69	Q
5	1	Marie Mathieu	Puerto Rico	23.76	Q
6	1	Olga Korotkova	Soviet Union	23.76	Q
7	2	Sylvie Revaux	France	23.82	q
8	1	Lena Möller	Sweden	23.97	q
9	2	Dijana Ištvanović	Yugoslavia	24.03	
10	2	Carla Mercurio	Italy	24.22	
11	2	Piroska Hracs	Hungary	24.22	
12	1	Leanne Evans	Australia	24.27	
13	2	Steluța Vintila	Romania	24.28	
14	1	Claudine Mas	France	24.63	
	1	Kerstin Walther	East Germany	??.??	
	1	Sheila de Oliveira	Brazil	??.??	

=== Final ===
Wind: +1.0 m/s

Rank	Athlete	Nationality	Time	Notes
1st place, gold medalist(s)	Kathy Smallwood	Great Britain	22.78	
2nd place, silver medalist(s)	Marisa Masullo	Italy	23.36	
3rd place, bronze medalist(s)	Irina Nazarova	Soviet Union	23.45	
4	Marie Mathieu	Puerto Rico	23.59	
5	Luisa Ferrer	Cuba	23.83	
6	Olga Korotkova	Soviet Union	23.98	
7	Sylvie Revaux	France	24.07	
8	Lena Möller	Sweden	24.09	
