= 1982 European Athletics Championships – Women's 400 metres hurdles =

Women's 400 metres hurdles at the European Athletics Championships
- Venue: Olympic Stadium "Spiros Louis"
- Location: Athens, Greece
- Dates: 9 September 1982; 10 September 1982
- Competitors: 16 from 11 nations
- Winning time: 54.58 s

Medalists
gold medal	Ann-Louise Skoglund	Sweden
silver medal	Petra Pfaff	East Germany
bronze medal	Chantal Réga	France

These are the official results of the Women's 400 metres hurdles event at the 1982 European Championships in Athens, Greece, held at Olympic Stadium "Spiros Louis" on 9 and 10 September 1982.

== Medalists ==
Gold	Ann-Louise Skoglund; Sweden
Silver	Petra Pfaff; East Germany
Bronze	Chantal Réga; France

== Final ==
10 September

Rank	Final	Time
	Ann-Louise Skoglund (SWE)	54.58
	Petra Pfaff (GDR)	54.90
	Chantal Réga (FRA)	54.94
4.	Anna Kastetskaya (URS)	55.09
5.	Yelena Filipishina (URS)	55.09
6.	Birgit Uibel (GDR)	55.70
7.	Yekaterina Fesenko (URS)	55.86
8.	Genowefa Błaszak (POL)	56.89

== Heats ==
9 September

Rank	Heat 1	Time
1.	Chantal Réga (FRA)	55.73
2.	Birgit Uibel (GDR)	55.86
3.	Yelena Filipishina (URS)	55.95
4.	Genowefa Błaszak (POL)	56.73
5.	Marlies Gutewort (FRG)	57.34
6.	Yvette Wray (GBR)	57.81
7.	Rosa-María Colorado (ESP)	58.91
8.	Cristieana Cojocaru (ROU)	59.00

Rank	Heat 2	Time
1.	Anna Kastetskaya (URS)	55.72
2.	Petra Pfaff (GDR)	55.81
3.	Ann-Louise Skoglund (SWE)	55.96
4.	Yekaterina Fesenko (URS)	56.49
5.	Mary Wagner (FRG)	56.74
6.	Giuseppina Cirulli (ITA)	56.85
7.	Montserrat Pujol (ESP)	58.06
8.	Helle Sichlau (DEN)	58.91

== Participation ==
According to an unofficial count, 16 athletes from 11 countries participated in the event.

- Denmark (1)
- East Germany (2)
- France (1)
- Italy (1)
- Poland (1)
- Romania (1)
- Soviet Union (3)
- Spain (2)
- Sweden (1)
- United Kingdom (1)
- West Germany (2)

== See also ==
- 1978 Women's European Championships 400m Hurdles (Prague)
- 1983 Women's World Championships 400m Hurdles (Helsinki)
- 1984 Women's Olympic 400m Hurdles (Moscow)
- 1986 Women's European Championships 400m Hurdles (Stuttgart)
- 1987 Women's World Championships 400m Hurdles (Rome)
- 1988 Women's Olympic 400m Hurdles (Seoul)
