= Athletics at the 1981 Summer Universiade – Women's 4 × 400 metres relay =

The women's 4 × 400 metres relay event at the 1981 Summer Universiade was held at the Stadionul Naţional in Bucharest on 26 July 1981. It was the first time that this event was contested by women at the Universiade.

== Results ==
Rank	Nation	Athletes	Time	Notes
1st place, gold medalist(s)	Soviet Union	Ana Ambrazienė, Irina Baskakova, Natalya Alyoshina, Irina Nazarova	3:26.65	
2nd place, silver medalist(s)	United States	Kelia Bolton, Leann Warren, Robin Campbell, Delisa Walton-Floyd	3:29.50	
3rd place, bronze medalist(s)	Romania	Steluța Vintila, Stela Manea, Ibolya Korodi, Elena Tărîţă	3:30.47	
4	France	Claudine Mas, Sylvie Revaux, Marie-Christine Champenois, Sophie Malbranque	3:33.49	
5	West Germany	Dagmar Schenten, Martina Krott, Birgit Dressel, Andrea Decker	3:43.90	
6	Lebanon	May Sardouk, Mirna Aoudi, Ande Kassatly, Mina Zeina	4:09.93	
