= Athletics at the 1991 Summer Universiade – Women's 400 metres hurdles =

The women's 400 metres hurdles event at the 1991 Summer Universiade was held at the Don Valley Stadium in Sheffield on the 23 and 24 July 1991.

== Medalists ==
Gold	Silver	Bronze
Gretha Tromp; Netherlands	Nicoleta Căruţaşu; Romania	Anna Chuprina; Soviet Union

== Results ==
=== Heats ===
Rank	Heat	Athlete	Nationality	Time	Notes
1	1	Anna Chuprina	Soviet Union	57.38	Q
2	3	Tonya Lee	United States	57.41	Q
3	2	Gretha Tromp	Netherlands	57.61	Q
4	1	Elisa Jiménez	Cuba	57.67	Q
5	1	Jacqui Parker	Great Britain	57.71	q
6	2	Nicoleta Căruţaşu	Romania	57.76	Q
7	3	Tatyana Kurochkina	Soviet Union	57.90	Q
8	2	Corinne Pierre	France	57.94	q
9	3	Aura Cracea	Romania	57.99	
10	3	Adrienne Rainbird	Australia	58.37	
11	1	Tonja Buford	United States	58.58	
12	2	Jill McDermid	Canada	58.79	
13	3	Mari Bjone	Norway	58.88	
14	1	Anna Suurnäkki	Finland	59.06	
15	3	Puha Neiger	Israel	59.09	
16	3	Barbara Gähling	Germany	59.23	
17	2	Amona Schneeweis	Germany	59.25	
18	3	Althea Thomas	Canada	59.33	
19	1	Monika Warnicka	Poland	59.40	
20	2	Agata Sadurska	Mexico	59.43	
21	2	Alejandra Quintanar	Poland	59.54	
22	1	Marie-José Valamatos	Portugal	1:00.14	
23	2	Francesca Lanzara	Italy	1:01.08	

=== Final ===
Rank	Athlete	Nationality	Time	Notes
1st place, gold medalist(s)	Gretha Tromp	Netherlands	55.30	
2nd place, silver medalist(s)	Nicoleta Căruţaşu	Romania	56.07	
3rd place, bronze medalist(s)	Anna Chuprina	Soviet Union	56.74	
4	Jacqui Parker	Great Britain	56.93	
5	Tatyana Kurochkina	Soviet Union	57.04	
6	Tonya Lee	United States	57.41	
7	Corinne Pierre	France	57.92	
8	Elisa Jiménez	Cuba	58.36	
