= Lai Lee-chiao =

Taiwanese athlete

Personal information
- Nationality: Taiwanese
- Born: 賴利嬌, Pinyin: Lài Lì-jiāo; 15 January 1955 (age 71)

Sport
- Sport: Track and field
- Event: 400 metres hurdles

Lai Lee-chiao (born 15 January 1955) is a Taiwanese hurdler. She competed in the women's 400 metres hurdles at the 1984 Summer Olympics.
