= Athletics at the 1987 Summer Universiade – Women's 400 metres hurdles =

The women's 400 metres hurdles event at the 1987 Summer Universiade was held at the Stadion Maksimir in Zagreb on 13 and 14 July 1987.

== Medalists ==
Gold	Silver	Bronze
Nawal El Moutawakel; Morocco	Nicoleta Carutasu; Romania	Sophia Hunter; United States

== Results ==
=== Heats ===
Rank	Heat	Athlete	Nationality	Time	Notes
1	1	Hélène Huart	France	56.22	Q
2	1	Sophia Hunter	United States	56.30	q
3	4	Margarita Navickaitė	Soviet Union	56.42	Q
4	2	Nicoleta Carutasu	Romania	56.53	Q
5	1	Kathy Freeman	United States	56.53	q
6	3	Nawal El Moutawakel	Morocco	57.25	Q
7	3	Erika Szopori	Hungary	57.54	q
8	2	Helga Halldórsdóttir	Iceland	57.57	q
9	4	Dawn Gandy	Great Britain	58.03	
10	3	Irmgard Trojer	Italy	58.13	
11	4	Sabine Alber	West Germany	58.21	
12	4	Gwen Wall	Canada	58.59	
13	2	Beate Holzapfel	West Germany	58.79	
14	4	Maria Luisa Climbini	Italy	58.93	
15	2	Chionati Kapeti	Greece	59.63	
16	3	Dejana Rakita	Yugoslavia	1:01.23	
17	1	Paulina Caroca	Chile	1:04.58	
18	3	Glenys Reynoso	Dominican Republic	1:05.19	
19	1	Estela Kelly	Panama	1:06.06	
	3	Carmen Rivera	Puerto Rico	DNF	

=== Final ===
Rank	Athlete	Nationality	Time	Notes
1st place, gold medalist(s)	Nawal El Moutawakel	Morocco	55.21	
2nd place, silver medalist(s)	Nicoleta Carutasu	Romania	55.35	
3rd place, bronze medalist(s)	Sophia Hunter	United States	55.45	
4	Margarita Navickaitė	Soviet Union	56.40	
5	Kathy Freeman	United States	57.46	
6	Helga Halldórsdóttir	Iceland	57.53	
7	Erika Szopori	Hungary	58.00	
8	Hélène Huart	France	58.09	
