= Athletics at the 1978 Commonwealth Games – Women's pentathlon =

Women's pentathlon event at Commonwealth Games

Women's pentathlon at the Commonwealth Games

The women's pentathlon event at the 1978 Commonwealth Games was held on 6 August at the Commonwealth Stadium in Edmonton, Alberta, Canada. This was the last time that this event was contested at the Commonwealth Games, four years later being replaced by the heptathlon.

== Results ==
The best mark for each event is highlighted. All five events were won by the gold medallist which as of 2024 is the only time this has happened in a women's pentathlon at a major championships.

The winning margin was 546 points which smashed the previous record of 111 points set in Edinburgh eight years earlier.

Rank	Athlete	Nationality	100m H	SP	HJ	LJ	800m	Points	Notes
1st place, gold medalist(s)	Diane Jones-Konihowski	Canada	13.85	14.87	1.88	6.41	2:12.1	4768	GR
2nd place, silver medalist(s)	Sue Mapstone	England	14.17	11.32	1.75	6.06	2:19.3	4222	
3rd place, bronze medalist(s)	Yvette Wray	England	14.16	12.15	1.64	6.04	2:15.6	4211	
4	Jill Ross	Canada						4205	
5	Karen Page	New Zealand						4099	
6	Ruth Howell	Wales						4022	
7	Barbara Beable	New Zealand						3989	
8	Julie White	Canada						3940	
9	Wendy Phillips	Northern Ireland						3594	
10	Jennifer Swanston	Barbados						3517	
	Glynis Saunders	Australia	14.45	11.34	NM	DNS	–	DNF	
