= Ileana Hocking =

Puerto Rican sprinter

Personal information
- Nationality: Puerto Rican
- Born: 15 March 1959 (age 67)
- Height: 1.58 m (5 ft 2 in)
- Weight: 54 kg (119 lb)

Sport
- Sport: Sprinting; Middle distance running
- Events: 400 metres 800 metres 1500 metres

Leana Hocking (born 15 March 1959) is a Puerto Rican sprinter and middle-distance runner. She competed in the women's 400 metres at the 1976 Summer Olympics. Hocking finished seventh in the 1500 metres at the 1975 Pan American Games and sixth in the 1500 metres at the 1979 Pan American Games.

Hocking competed in the AIAW for the North Texas Mean Green track and field team, finishing 8th in the 1500 m at the 1980 AIAW Outdoor Track and Field Championships.

== International competitions ==
Year	Competition	Venue	Position	Event	Notes
Representing Puerto Rico
1974	Central American and Caribbean; Junior Championships (U-20)	Maracaibo, Venezuela	2nd	800 m	2:14.04
1974	Central American and Caribbean; Junior Championships (U-20)	Maracaibo, Venezuela	1st	1500 m	4:45.61
1975	Pan American Games	Mexico City, Mexico	7th	1500 m	4:51.47
1976	Olympic Games	Montreal, Canada	36th (h)	400 m	57.85
1976	Olympic Games	Montreal, Canada	32nd (h)	800 m	2:08.46
1976	Central American and Caribbean; Junior Championships (U-20)	Xalapa, Mexico	3rd	400 m	57.63
1976	Central American and Caribbean; Junior Championships (U-20)	Xalapa, Mexico	1st	800 m	2:13.38
1976	Central American and Caribbean; Junior Championships (U-20)	Xalapa, Mexico	1st	1500 m	4:51.0
1976	Central American and Caribbean; Junior Championships (U-20)	Xalapa, Mexico	1st	4 × 100 m relay	49.72
1976	Central American and Caribbean; Junior Championships (U-20)	Xalapa, Mexico	1st	4 × 400 m relay	3:57.38
1978	Central American and Caribbean Games	Medellín, Colombia	5th	800 m	2:09.65
1978	Central American and Caribbean Games	Medellín, Colombia	2nd	1500 m	4:35.88
1978	Central American and Caribbean Games	Medellín, Colombia	3rd	4 × 400 m relay	3:46.58
1979	Pan American Games	San Juan, Puerto Rico	12th (h)	800 m	2:16.8
1979	Pan American Games	San Juan, Puerto Rico	6th	1500 m	4:27.3
1979	Pan American Games	San Juan, Puerto Rico	5th	4 × 400 m relay	3:49.4

== Personal bests ==
- 400 metres – 55.95 (1974)
- 800 metres – 2:06.37 (1980).
