= Athletics at the 1981 Summer Universiade – Women's 800 metres =

The women's 800 metres event at the 1981 Summer Universiade was held at the Stadionul Naţional in Bucharest on 25 and 26 July 1981.

== Medalists ==
| Gold | Silver | Bronze |
|---|---|---|
| Doina Melinte; Romania | Gabriella Dorio; Italy | Tudorita Morutan; Romania |

== Results ==
=== Heats ===
| Rank | Heat | Athlete | Nationality | Time | Notes |
|---|---|---|---|---|---|
| 1 | 1 | Doina Melinte | Romania | 2:02.92 | Q |
| 2 | 1 | Nina Ruchayeva | Soviet Union | 2:03.56 | Q |
| 3 | 1 | Ewa Głódź | Poland | 2:04.05 | |
| 4 | 1 | Heather Wright | Australia | 2:04.14 | |
| 5 | 1 | Angelita Lind | Puerto Rico | 2:05.98 | |
| 6 | 1 | Hala El-Moughrabi | Syria | 2:14.39 | |
| 1 | 2 | Gabriella Dorio | Italy | 1:59.17 | Q |
| 2 | 2 | Cherry Hanson | Great Britain | 2:00.30 | Q |
| 3 | 2 | Ludmila Ashikhmina | Soviet Union | 2:02.05 | q |
| 4 | 2 | Nery McKeen | Cuba | 2:04.05 | |
| 5 | 2 | Katharina Sävestrand | Sweden | 2:11.00 | |
| 1 | 3 | Robin Campbell | United States | 2:01.86 | Q |
| 2 | 3 | Tudorita Morutan | Romania | 2:0?.?? | Q |
| 3 | 3 | Christina Boxer | Great Britain | 2:02.50 | |
| 4 | 3 | Gloria Pallé | Spain | 2:05.06 | |
| 5 | 3 | Georgia Troubouki | Greece | 2:06.10 | |

=== Final ===
| Rank | Athlete | Nationality | Time | Notes |
|---|---|---|---|---|
| 1st place, gold medalist(s) | Doina Melinte | Romania | 1:57.81 | |
| 2nd place, silver medalist(s) | Gabriella Dorio | Italy | 1:58.99 | |
| 3rd place, bronze medalist(s) | Tudorita Morutan | Romania | 1:59.30 | |
| 4 | Nina Ruchayeva | Soviet Union | 1:59.31 | |
| 5 | LeAnn Warren | United States | 1:59.72 | |
| 6 | Ludmila Ashikhmina | Soviet Union | 2:01.13 | |
| 7 | Robin Campbell | United States | 2:01.44 | |
| 8 | Cherry Hanson | Great Britain | 2:02.83 | |
