= Angelita Lind =

Puerto Rican Olympic runner

Personal information
- Born: January 13, 1959 (age 67) Patillas, Puerto Rico

Sport
- Sport: Track and field
Medal record
Representing Puerto Rico
Central American and Caribbean Games
Gold medal – first place	1982 Havana	1500 m
Gold medal – first place	1986 Santiago	1500 m
Silver medal – second place	1986 Santiago	4x400m relay
CAC Junior Championships (U20)
Gold medal – first place	1976 Xalapa	4x100 m relay
Gold medal – first place	1976 Xalapa	4x400 m relay

Angelita Lind Soliveras a.k.a. "The Angel of Puerto Rico" (born January 13, 1959) is a Puerto Rican track and field athlete.

== Early years ==
Lind was born in the barrio Marin Bajo of Patillas, Puerto Rico into a poor family. She received her primary and secondary education in her hometown. Lind first participated in track and field events in the 7th grade and later continued participating for her high school. However, it wasn't until she became a student at the Interamerican University of Puerto Rico that she was asked by the Puerto Rican Olympic Committee to represent Puerto Rico in international sports events.

== International competitions ==
Lind has represented the island and participated in three Central American and Caribbean Games (CAC) and won two gold medals, three silver medals and one bronze medal. She also participated in three Pan American Games and in the 1984 Summer Olympics celebrated in Los Angeles, California.

In the CAC of 1982, celebrated in Havana, Cuba, Lind was the flagbearer for Puerto Rico. In those games, she won a gold medal in the 1,500 meter dash with a record time of 4:25.88 and a silver in the 800 meters dash in a controversial race in 2:04.24. In that race, she crossed the finish line with two Cuban runners next to her. Right at the finish line the two Cuban girls ran into each other and they both knocked Angelita down. Lind's feet were crossing the finish line, but because the Cuban fell into Angelita from behind, it was the Cuban who actually crossed the finish line first; after a prolonged discussion which reached the central offices of the International Athletic Federation, it was decided that Lind arrived second. They based their decision on a rule of track and field which states that the first torso across the finish line wins.

By this time there had been a lot of trouble between the Government of Puerto Rico, headed by pro-US statehood governor Carlos Romero Barceló, (who withheld economic support from the athletic delegation headed to Cuba), and the Puerto Rican Olympic Committee, presided by German Rieckehoff, which had to appeal directly to the people for donations. Lind's "fall" united the people of Puerto Rico and for the first time, they forgot about the fight between the Olympic Committee and the government and concentrated on the sport - these events also served to inspire future runners.

== World Masters Athletics ==
Angelita Lind officially retired in 1992, however in July 2003 at age 44, she returned to participate in the 1,500 dash in the World Masters Athletics championships, which were celebrated in San Juan, Puerto Rico. She continues to hold the national record for the 800 meters dash and the 1,500 meters dash.

== Later years ==
She earned her master's degree from the Interamerican University of Puerto Rico and is currently a professor of physical education. Lind also serves as assistant athletic director in the department of physical education at the Interamerican University of Puerto Rico campus in San German, Puerto Rico. In 2004, she was inducted into the "Puerto Rican Sports Hall of Fame".

== Competition record ==
Year	Competition	Venue	Position	Event	Notes
Representing Puerto Rico
1976	Central American and Caribbean; Junior Championships (U-20)	Xalapa, Mexico	1st	4 × 100 m relay	49.72
1976	Central American and Caribbean; Junior Championships (U-20)	Xalapa, Mexico	1st	4 × 400 m relay	3:57.38
1978	Central American and Caribbean Games	Medellín, Colombia	3rd (h)	800 m	2:13.93
1978	Central American and Caribbean Games	Medellín, Colombia	10th	1500 m	NT
1978	Central American and Caribbean Games	Medellín, Colombia	3rd	4 × 400 m relay	3:46.58
1979	Central American and Caribbean Championships	Guadalajara, Mexico	3rd	1500 m	4:42.4
1979	Pan American Games	San Juan, Puerto Rico	9th	1500 m	4:40.9
1979	Pan American Games	San Juan, Puerto Rico	6th	3000 m	10:30.8
1979	Pan American Games	San Juan, Puerto Rico	5th	4 × 400 m relay	3:49.4
1981	Central American and Caribbean Championships	Santo Domingo, Dominican Republic	1st	800 m	2:04.69
1981	Central American and Caribbean Championships	Santo Domingo, Dominican Republic	2nd	1500 m	4:26.83
1981	Universiade	Bucharest, Romania	14th (h)	800 m	2:05.98
1981	Universiade	Bucharest, Romania	14th (h)	1500 m	4:25.50^{1}
1981	World Cup	Rome, Italy	9th	800 m	10:20.92^{2}
1982	Central American and Caribbean Games	Havana, Cuba	2nd	800 m	2:04.24
1982	Central American and Caribbean Games	Havana, Cuba	1st	1500 m	4:25.94
1983	Pan American Games	Caracas, Venezuela	7th	800 m	2:07.19
1983	Pan American Games	Caracas, Venezuela	5th	4 × 400 m relay	3:42.90
1984	Olympic Games	Los Angeles, United States	13th (h)	800 m	2:03.27
1984	Olympic Games	Los Angeles, United States	8th (h)	4 × 400 m relay	3:37.39^{3}
1985	Central American and Caribbean Championships	Nassau, Bahamas	1st	1500 m	4:23.35
1986	Central American and Caribbean Games	Santiago, Dominican Republic	2nd	800 m	2:02.12
1986	Central American and Caribbean Games	Santiago, Dominican Republic	1st	1500 m	4:18.67
1986	Central American and Caribbean Games	Santiago, Dominican Republic	2nd	4 × 400 m relay	3:41.32
1987	Central American and Caribbean Championships	Caracas, Venezuela	1st	800 m	2:04.87
1987	Central American and Caribbean Championships	Caracas, Venezuela	2nd	1500 m	4:29.51
1987	Central American and Caribbean Championships	Caracas, Venezuela	3rd	4 × 400 m relay	3:41.82
1987	Pan American Games	Indianapolis, United States	5th	800 m	2:04.83
1987	Pan American Games	Indianapolis, United States	6th	1500 m	4:25.68
1987	World Championships	Rome, Italy	21st (h)	800 m	2:04.59
1988	Ibero-American Championships	Mexico City, Mexico	7th	1500 m	5:15.68
1988	Ibero-American Championships	Mexico City, Mexico	4th	4 × 400 m relay	3:40.74
1991	Central American and Caribbean Championships	Xalapa, Mexico	1st	800 m	2:05.96
1991	Central American and Caribbean Championships	Xalapa, Mexico	2nd	1500 m	4:31.65
1991	Pan American Games	Havana, Cuba	9th	1500 m	4:34.00

^{1}Did not finish in the final
^{2}Representing the Americas
^{3}Did not start in the final

== See also ==
- List of Puerto Ricans
- History of women in Puerto Rico
