= Mary Parr =

Irish hurdler

Personal information
- Nationality: Irish
- Born: 1 October 1961 (age 64)

Sport
- Sport: Track and field
- Event: 400 metres hurdles

Mary Parr (born 1 October 1961) is an Irish hurdler. She competed in the women's 400 metres hurdles at the 1984 Summer Olympics.
