= David Giralt =

Cuban long jumper (1959–2020)

Personal information
- Born: 28 June 1959 Dos Caminos, Cuba
- Died: 13 April 2020 (aged 60) Havana, Cuba

Sport
- Sport: Track and field
Medal record
Representing Cuba
Pan American Games
Silver medal – second place	1979 San Juan	Long jump
Central American and Caribbean Games
Gold medal – first place	1978 Medellin	Long jump
Summer Universiade
Bronze medal – third place	1977 Sofia	Long jump
CAC Junior Championships (U20)
Gold medal – first place	1976 Xalapa	Long jump
Gold medal – first place	1976 Xalapa	Triple jump
Gold medal – first place	1976 Xalapa	4x100 m relay

David Erundino Giralt Agramonte (28 June 1959 – 13 April 2020) was a Cuban long jumper. His personal best jump was 8.22 metres, achieved in August 1979 in Montreal. He achieved that mark at the World Cup, and went on to represent Cuba at the 1980 Olympics in Moscow, Russia. He is the father of triple jumper Arnie David Giralt.

== Achievements ==
Year	Competition	Venue	Position	Event	Notes
Representing Cuba
1976	Central American and Caribbean; Junior Championships (U20)	Xalapa, Mexico	1st	Long jump	7.46 m A
1976	Central American and Caribbean; Junior Championships (U20)	Xalapa, Mexico	1st	Triple jump	16.25 m A
1976	Central American and Caribbean; Junior Championships (U20)	Xalapa, Mexico	1st	4 × 100 m relay	42.44 s A
1977	Central American and Caribbean Championships	Ponce, Puerto Rico	1st	Long jump	7.96 m
1977	Universiade	Sofia, Bulgaria	3rd	Long jump	7.92 m
1977	World Cup	Düsseldorf, West Germany	8th	Long jump	6.77 m^{1}
1978	Central American and Caribbean Games	Medellín, Colombia	1st	Long jump	7.82 m A
1979	Spartakiad	Moscow, Soviet Union	2nd	Long jump	8.12 m
1979	Pan American Games	San Juan, Puerto Rico	2nd	Long jump	8.15 m
1979	World Cup	Montreal, Canada	3rd	Long jump	8.22 m^{1}
1980	Olympic Games	Moscow, Soviet Union	21st (q)	Long jump	7.57 m
1981	Central American and Caribbean Championships	Santo Domingo, Dominican Republic	2nd	Long jump	7.74 m

^{1}Representing the Americas
