= Athletics at the 1979 Pan American Games – Women's 3000 metres =

Women's 3000 metres at the 1979 Pan American Games
- Venue: Estadio Sixto Escobar
- Dates: 7 July
- Winning time: 8:53.6

Medalists
Gold medal	Jan Merrill	United States
Silver medal	Julie Brown	United States
Bronze medal	Geri Fitch	Canada

The women's 3000 metres sprint competition of the athletics events at the 1979 Pan American Games took place on 7 July at the Estadio Sixto Escobar.

== Records ==
Prior to this competition, the existing world record was as follows:

World record	Lyudmila Bragina (URS)	8:27.2	College Park, Australia	August 7, 1976

== Results ==
All times are in minutes and seconds. Since it was the first time this event was held in the Pan American Games, Jan Merrill's winning time was registered as a Pan American record.

KEY:	WR	World Record	GR	Pan American Record

=== Final ===
Rank	Name	Nationality	Time	Notes
1st place, gold medalist(s)	Jan Merrill	United States	8:53.6	GR
2nd place, silver medalist(s)	Julie Brown	United States	8:59.9	
3rd place, bronze medalist(s)	Geri Fitch	Canada	9:35.7	
4	Carmen Garduño	Mexico	9:49.5	
5	Carmen Montañez	Puerto Rico	10:14.8	
6	Angelita Lind	Puerto Rico	10:30.8	
7	Norma Franco	El Salvador	10:55.8	
8	Edith Rodríguez	Colombia	11:41.5	
	Shauna Miller	Canada	DNS	
	Irma Hernández	Mexico	DNS	
