= Gwen Wall =

Canadian hurdler (born 1963)

Personal information
- Born: 16 January 1963 (age 63) Saskatoon, Saskatchewan, Canada

Sport
- Country: Canada
- Sport: Athletics
- Event: 400 metres hurdles
Medal record
Representing Canada
Pan American Games
Silver medal – second place	1983 Caracas	4x400m relay
Bronze medal – third place	1983 Caracas	400m hurdles
Summer Universiade
Bronze medal – third place	1983 Edmonton	400m hurdles

Gwen Wall (born 16 January 1963) is a Canadian retired athlete who competed in the 400 metres hurdles. She represented her country at two World Championships. In addition she won a bronze medal at the 1983 Pan American Games.

Her personal best in the event is 56.68 seconds set in Helsinki in 1983.

== International competitions ==
Year	Competition	Venue	Position	Event	Notes
Representing Canada
1982	Pan American Junior Athletics Championships	Barquisimeto, Venezuela	3rd	400 m hurdles	60.25
1982	Pan American Junior Athletics Championships	Barquisimeto, Venezuela	2nd	4 × 400 m relay	3:43.12
1982	Commonwealth Games	Brisbane, Australia	8th	400 m hurdles	58.49
1983	Universiade	Edmonton, Canada	3rd	400 m hurdles	56.10
1983	World Championships	Helsinki, Finland	9th (sf)	400 m hurdles	56.68
1983	Pan American Games	Caracas, Venezuela	3rd	400 m hurdles	56.93
1983	Pan American Games	Caracas, Venezuela	2nd	4 × 400 m relay	3:30.24
1985	Pacific Conference Games	Berkeley, United States	2nd	400 m hurdles	57.64
1985	Universiade	Kobe, Japan	10th (h)	400 m hurdles	58.51
1985	World Cup	Canberra, Australia	8th	400 m hurdles	58.13^{1}
1986	Commonwealth Games	Edinburgh, United Kingdom	4th	400 m hurdles	57.49
1987	Universiade	Zagreb, Yugoslavia	12th (h)	400 m hurdles	58.59
1987	Pan American Games	Indianapolis, United States	8th	400 m hurdles	58.82
1987	World Championships	Rome, Italy	26th (h)	400 m hurdles	58.66

^{1}Representing the Americas
