= 1974 South American Junior Championships in Athletics =

X South American Junior Championships in Athletics
- Dates: October 9–13
- Host city: Lima, Peru
- Venue: Estadio Nacional
- Level: Under-19
- Events: 33
- Participation: about 239 athletes from 9 nations

The tenth South American Junior Championships in Athletics were held in Lima, Peru, at the Estadio Nacional between October 9–13, 1974.

== Participation (unofficial) ==
Detailed result lists can be found on the "World Junior Athletics History" website. An unofficial count yields the number of about 239 athletes from about 9 countries: Argentina (44), Bolivia (11), Brazil (40), Chile (29), Colombia (17), Panama (10), Paraguay (11), Peru (45), Venezuela (32).

== Medal summary ==
Medal winners are published for men and women Complete results can be found on the "World Junior Athletics History" website.

=== Men ===
Event	Gold		Silver		Bronze	
100 metres	Diego Valencia (COL)	10.7	Jorge Baleche (BRA)	10.8	Hipólito Brown (VEN)	11.0
200 metres	Edgar Biojo (COL)	21.5	Diego Valencia (COL)	21.9	Jorge Baleche (BRA)	22.0
400 metres	Joelmerson de Carvalho (BRA)	49.2	Eduardo Gómez (PER)	49.6	Edgar Biojo (COL)	49.6
800 metres	Luis Gómez (PER)	1:55.7	José Desterro Silva (BRA)	1:55.9	Juan Holman (ARG)	1:56.1
1500 metres	Angel Holman (ARG)	3:56.2	Raúl Riveros (CHI)		Gabriel Giraldo (COL)	3:58.8
3000 metres	Gabriel Giraldo (COL)	8:46.4	Octavio O'Neill (CHI)	8:47.5	Héctor Ramírez (COL)	8:51.2
110 metres hurdles	Geraldo Rodrigues (BRA)	15.6	Guillermo Gago (ARG)	15.9	Carlos Spraggón (ARG)	16.0
400 metres hurdles	Guillermo Gago (ARG)	54.9	Jesús Betancourt (COL)	55.0	Juan Betancourt (CHI)	55.1
1500 metres steeplechase	Raúl Rivero (CHI)	4:20.1	Angel Holman (ARG)	4:21.0	Sérgio Soares (BRA)	4:27.7
4 × 100 metres relay	Brazil; Carlos Cavalheiro; Katsuhiko Nakaya; Joelmerson de Carvalho; Jorge Baleche	41.9	Peru; José Ratto; Jorge Esposito; David Salazar; Rubén Vílchez	42.5	Paraguay; Hugo Martínez; Mario Becker; Modesto García; Alberto Schwiecker	42.9
4 × 400 metres relay	Brazil; Manoel da Cunha; José Desterro Silva; Carlos Cavalheiro; Joelmerson de Carvalho	3:18.5	Colombia; Irme Valdez; Jesús Betancourt; Edgar Biojo; Diego Valenci	3:19.4	Peru; Luis Gómez; Jorge Esposito; David Salazar; Gerardo Salazar	3:22.8
High jump	Azael Rivadeneyra (COL)	1.94	Renato Bortolocci (BRA)	1.91	Geraldo Rodrigues (BRA)	1.91
Pole vault	Renato Bortolocci (BRA)	4.35	Guillermo Chiaraviglio (ARG)	4.10	Fernando Mendes (BRA)	4.05
Long jump	Hugo Meriano (ARG)	7.04	Gilmar dos Santos (BRA)	6.73	Hugo Martínez (PAN)	6.71
Triple jump	Walter Herrero (ARG)	14.42	Carlos Penna (BRA)	14.06	Lucivaldo Romano (BRA)	13.86
Shot put	Armando de Zorzi (BRA)	15.98	Modesto Barreto (COL)	15.66	Eduardo Galvão (BRA)	14.44
Discus throw	Modesto Barreto (COL)	47.16	Angel Garmendia (ARG)	40.80	Eduardo Galvão (BRA)	40.71
Hammer throw	Armando de Zorzi (BRA)	53.46	José Rangel (COL)	53.02	Sergio Rodríguez (ARG)	51.56
Javelin throw	Angel Garmendia (ARG)	62.74	Daniel Scharzer (ARG)	59.46	Manoel Bezerra (BRA)	59.00
Pentathlon*	Geraldo Rodrigues (BRA)	3898	Roberto Steinmetz (ARG)	3838	Renato Bortolocci (BRA)	3687

* = another source rather states: Hexathlon

=== Women ===
Event	Gold		Silver		Bronze	
100 metres	Carmela Bolívar (PER)	11.8	Esmeralda Freitas (BRA)	11.8	Conceição Geremias (BRA)	12.0
200 metres	Belkis Fava (ARG)	24.4	Carmela Bolívar (PER)	24.6	Eucaris Caicedo (COL)	24.9
400 metres	Eucaris Caicedo (COL)	55.3	Adriana Marchena (VEN)	56.3	Alejandra Ramos (CHI)	56.4
800 metres	Alejandra Ramos (CHI)	2:12.6	Adriana Marchena (VEN)	2:13.3	Rita Femia (ARG)	2:17.4
100 metres hurdles	Conceição Geremias (BRA)	14.4	Simone Krauthausen (PER)	14.5	Gloria Barturen (CHI)	15.1
4 × 100 metres relay	Argentina; Christa Sommersguter; Rosana Pereña; Susana Perizzotti; Belkis Fava	47.3	Peru; Cecilia Céspedes; Simone Krauthausen; Beatriz Pacheco; Carmela Bolívar	47.7	Brazil; Conceição Geremias; Marcia Xavier; Esmeralda de Jesus Garcia; Maria Amorim	47.9
4 × 400 metres relay	Brazil; Maria Ferreira; Miriam da Silva; Nazareth; Conceição Geremias	3:54.1	Argentina; Hilda Capello; Rosana Pereña; Adriana Britos; Rita Femia	3:56.8	Colombia; Leonor Santana; Amparo Betancourt; Cruz Ibargüen; Eucaris Caicedo	4:01.4
High jump	Beatriz Arancibia (CHI)	1.66	Ana Rojas (VEN)	1.66	Rosemarie Boeck (PER)	1.60
Long jump	Yvonne Neddermann (ARG)	5.97	Conceição Geremias (BRA)	5.84	Christa Sommersguter (ARG)	5.81
Shot put	Verônica Brunner (BRA)	12.78	Luisa Tapia (CHI)	11.27	Lúcia Porto (BRA)	11.04
Discus throw	Verônica Brunner (BRA)	43.46	Andrea Wilke (CHI)	37.62	Mónica Sholze (ARG)	35.72
Javelin throw	Susana Sánchez (ARG)	40.14	Olga Verissimo (BRA)	39.40	Asunción Figueroa (CHI)	39.10
Pentathlon	Conceição Geremias (BRA)	3964	Simone Krauthausen (PER)	3688	Rosemarie Boeck (PER)	3649

== Medal table (unofficial) ==
* Host nation (Peru)

Rank	Nation	Gold	Silver	Bronze	Total
1	Brazil	13	8	12	33
2	Argentina	9	7	6	22
3	Colombia	6	6	5	17
4	Chile	3	3	4	10
5	Peru*	2	6	3	11
6	Venezuela	0	3	1	4
7	Panama	0	0	1	1
7	Paraguay	0	0	1	1
Totals (8 entries)		33	33	33	99
