= 1976 Central American and Caribbean Junior Championships in Athletics =

II Central American and Caribbean Junior Championships
- Dates: 26–29 August
- Host city: Xalapa, Mexico
- Level: Junior (and Youth?)
- Events: 57 (36 junior, 21 youth)
- Participation: about 127 (80 junior, 47 youth) athletes from 11 nations

The 2nd Central American and Caribbean Junior Championships was held in Xalapa, Mexico, on 26–29 August 1976. The city was already the host of the inaugural CAC senior championships in May, 1967.

Although one website states:"Under 17 events were first included on the programme of the biennial Central American and Caribbean Junior Championships in 1978," another website displays also results for under-17 events in 1976.

== Event summary ==
In the junior (U-20) category, Cuba won most gold medals (11), while host country Mexico was the overall leader in total medals (30).

In the under-20 men category, both Luis Alex Misiniak and David Giralt from Cuba won 3 golds (110m hurdles, 400m hurdles, 4 × 100 m relay) and (Long jump, Triple jump, 4 × 100 m relay), respectively. Another Cuban fellow, Juan Martínez and Bahamian Rickey Moxey won two golds each (Shot put, Discus Throw) and (100m, 200m) respectively.

In the under-20 women category, Ileana Hocking from Puerto Rico, who won already a gold (1500m) and a silver medal (800m) at the 1974 championships in Maracaibo, Venezuela, gained a total of 5 medals, 4 golds (800m, 1500m, 4 × 100 m relay, 4 × 400 m relay) and one bronze (400m). Ann Adams from Trinidad and Tobago gained 3 golds (100m, 200m, 100m hurdles), whereas Esther Vega from Puerto Rico won two golds (4 × 100 m relay, 4 × 400 m relay) and two silvers (400m, 100m hurdles), and Jennifer Swanston from Barbados won two golds (Long jump, Pentathlon).

Ernesto Canto from Mexico, future gold medallist in the men's 20 kilometre walk event at the 1984 Summer Olympics held in Los Angeles, California, defended his title and gained the gold medal in the 10,000 metres track walk event. And María Caridad Colón from Cuba, future gold medallist in Javelin Throw at the 1980 Summer Olympics held in Moscow, Soviet Union, won gold in Javelin Throw and bronze in the Shot Put event.

== Medal summary ==
Medal winners are published by category: Junior A, Male, and Junior A, Female.

=== Male Junior A (under 20) ===
Event	Gold		Silver		Bronze	
100 metres	Rickey Moxey (BAH)	10.53A	André Bruce (TRI)	10.64A	Euclides Bell (CUB)	10.65A
200 metres	Rickey Moxey (BAH)	21.76A	Euclides Bell (CUB)	21.92A	William Rodríguez (PUR)	21.97A
400 metres	Clyde Edwards (BAR)	48.28A	Juan de Jesús (PUR)	49.17A	Alejandro Rincón (DOM)	49.24A
800 metres	William Wuycke (VEN)	1:53.58A	Osmán Escobar (VEN)	1:55.46A	William Sanders (PUR)	1:56.72A
1500 metres	Carlos Víctorino (MEX)	4:04.5A	Francisco Silva (MEX)	4:05.1A	Aníbal Rivera (PUR)	4:05.8A
5000 metres	Francisco Rojas (MEX)	15:16.0A	Humberto Alba (MEX)	15:16.4A	Alberto Santos (PUR)	15:16.6A
10,000 metres	Pedro Santiago (PUR)	31:36.4A	Víctor Gil (VEN)	31:55.0A	Alberto Santos (PUR)	32:10.4A
3000 metres steeplechase	Juan Zetina (MEX)	9:10.8A	Víctor Gil (VEN)	9:42.8A	Alberto Santos (PUR)	9:48.6A
110 metres hurdles	Luis Alex Misiniak (CUB)	14.18A	Nelson Rodríguez (VEN)	14.81A	Miguel Mora (PUR)	15.03A
400 metres hurdles	Luis Alex Misiniak (CUB)	53.84A	Pedro Gilberto (PUR)	54.34A	Nelson Rodríguez (VEN)	54.76A
High jump	Víctor Romero (MEX)	1.90A	Gerald Wilson (BAH)	1.83A	Arnold Mongé (CRC)	1.83A
Pole vault	Ramón Sequeira (PUR)	4.10A	Elías Minián (MEX)	3.55A	Jesús Figueroa (MEX)	3.25A
Long jump	David Giralt (CUB)	7.46A	Ray Quiñones (PUR)	7.40A	Heriberto Battista (PUR)	7.04A
Triple jump	David Giralt (CUB)	16.25A	Steve Hanna (BAH)	14.72A	Jorge García (MEX)	14.08A
Shot put	Juan Martínez (CUB)	15.98A	Alberto Santiago (PUR)	14.95A	Javier Cunningham (VEN)	13.73A
Discus throw	Juan Martínez (CUB)	53.98A	Santiago Pernía (VEN)	39.43A	Rafael Vélez (PUR)	36.86A
Hammer throw	Andrés Polemil (DOM)	48.35A	Rey Santiago (PUR)	44.53A	Miguel Juárez (MEX)	42.65A
Javelin throw	Rafael Vélez (PUR)	58.07A	Stokeley Dean (TRI)	51.83A	Manuel Torres (MEX)	51.22A
Decathlon	Javier Meza (MEX)	6024A	Rey Quiñones (PUR)	5996A	Gustavo Rivera (MEX)	5643A
10,000 metres track walk	Ernesto Canto (MEX)	46:18.6A	Rudy Castillo (DOM)	50:41.8A	Rafael Hernández (MEX)	52:15.2A
4 × 100 metres relay	Cuba; Calbo; Luis Alex Misiniak; Euclides Bell; David Giralt	42.44A	Puerto Rico; Juan de Jesús; Juan Rodríguez; Miguel Mora; William Rodríguez	42.49A	Mexico	43.19A
4 × 400 metres relay	Puerto Rico	3:19.11A	Mexico	3:23.09A	Venezuela	3:28.15A

=== Female Junior A (under 20) ===
Event	Gold		Silver		Bronze	
100 metres	Ann Adams (TRI)	12.10A	Christine Barr (BAH)	12.16A	Marta Zulueta (CUB)	12.19A
200 metres	Ann Adams (TRI)	25.00A	Luisa Gilbert (CUB)	25.42A	Guadalupe García (MEX)	25.61A
400 metres	Luisa Gilbert (CUB)	56.98A	Esther Vega (PUR)	57.34A	Ileana Hocking (PUR)	57.63A
800 metres	Ileana Hocking (PUR)	2:13.38A	Célia Cruz (MEX)	2:17.31A	Diane Nancis (TRI)	2:19.61A
1500 metres	Ileana Hocking (PUR)	4:51.0A	Cristina Estrello (MEX)	4:58.0A	Célia Cruz (MEX)	5:02.6A
100 metres hurdles	Ann Adams (TRI)	14.80A	Esther Vega (PUR)	15.19A	Lorenza Orendaín (MEX)	15.92A
High jump	Reina Mateu (CUB)	1.75A	Ana Rojas (VEN)	1.66A	Maricela Vázquez (MEX)	1.60A
Long jump	Jennifer Swanston (BAR)	5.23A	Lorenza Orendaín (MEX)	5.10A	Ana Monroy (ESA)	4.93A
Shot put	Lucy Russel (BAH)	12.40A	Olimpia Figueroa (CUB)	12.19A	María Caridad Colón (CUB)	10.60A
Discus throw	Olimpia Figueroa (CUB)	38.29A	Joan Jackson (TRI)	34.14A	Guadalupe Téllez (MEX)	33.41A
Javelin throw	María Caridad Colón (CUB)	46.13A	Martha Blanco (MEX)	42.50A	Eva Palacios (MEX)	33.98A
Pentathlon	Jennifer Swanston (BAR)	3219A	Laura Vázquez (MEX)	3038A	Lorenza Orendaín (MEX)	2978A
4 × 100 metres relay	Puerto Rico; Lesbia Maldonado; Angelita Lind; Ileana Hocking; Stephanie Vega	49.72A	El Salvador	52.07A		
4 × 400 metres relay	Puerto Rico; Lesbia Maldonado; Angelita Lind; Stephanie Vega; Ileana Hocking	3:57.38A	Mexico; Célia Cruz; Lorenza Orendaín; Guadalupe García; A. Figueroa	4:02.33A	El Salvador	4:21.33A

=== Boys under 17 (Youth) ===
Event	Gold		Silver		Bronze	
100 metres	Eric Berrie (BAR)	10.88	Linton Williams (TRI)	11.14	Juan Falconier (MEX)	11.15
400 metres	Juan Rodríguez (PUR)	49.74	Donald Alfon (TRI)	??	Colin O'Brien (TRI)	??
2000 metres steeplechase	Agustin Flores (MEX)	6:15.96	Carmelo Hernández (PUR)	6:25.83	Nelson Castillo (MEX)	6:42.76
300 metres hurdles	Marcos Wimbert (MEX)	41.0	Alfredo Reyes (PUR)	??	Venancio Herrera (VEN)	??
High jump	Colin Thompson (BAH)	1.87	Ricardo Campbell (CRC)	1.84	Carlos Casar (MEX)	1.78
Long jump	Anthony Capron (BAH)	6.63	Gabriel Gil (MEX)	6.20	Carlos Falconier (MEX)	6.08
Triple jump	Colin Thompson (BAH)	12.80	Ricardo Campbell (CRC)	12.57	Xavier Pérez (MEX)	12.11
Shot put	Eric Rodríguez (PUR)	14.37	Agustin Álvarez (MEX)	13.38		
Discus throw	Rafael Arañaga (VEN)	43.49	Eric Rodríguez (PUR)	41.74	Agustin Álvarez (MEX)	39.77
Pentathlon	Ricardo Costas (PUR)	2555	Eric Berrie (BAR)	2214	Carlos Coronado (MEX)	2214
5000 metres Walk	Horacio Ibañez (MEX)	25:32.4	Fernando Bravo (MEX)	26:27.8		
4 × 100 metres relay	Mexico; López; Martínez; Martínez; Juan Falconier	43.51	Trinidad and Tobago	??	Puerto Rico	??

=== Girls under 17 (Youth) ===
Event	Gold		Silver		Bronze	
100 metres	Esther Hope (TRI)	11.90	Donna Listrop (TRI)	12.41	Maria Vizcarra (MEX)	12.46
400 metres	Eugene Green (BAH)	57.33	Gouldine Slaron (BAR)	57.88	Nieves Smith (TRI)	58.92
100 metres hurdles	Laura Maldonado (MEX)	15.30	Alma Preciado (MEX)	16.01	Nereyda Blanco (PAN)	17.17
High jump	Maria Emilia Lenk (MEX)	1.45	Maria Burgeno (MEX)	1.45	Ana Hidalgo (PUR)	1.45
Shot put	Juana Martínez (MEX)	11.26	Irma Arrellano (MEX)	10.75		
Discus throw	Monica Avalos (MEX)	31.97	Claudia Fabela (MEX)	27.97	Wanda Carmona (PUR)	18.40
Javelin throw	Blanca Herrera (MEX)	30.54	Leticia Abundis (MEX)	30.15		
Pentathlon	Alma Preciado (MEX)	3040	Laura Maldonado (MEX)	2778		
4 × 100 metres relay	Trinidad and Tobago	47.84	Mexico	49.45	Puerto Rico	

== Medal table (unofficial) ==
* Host nation (Mexico)

Rank	Nation	Gold	Silver	Bronze	Total
1	Mexico (MEX)*	16	20	22	58
2	Puerto Rico (PUR)	11	12	14	37
3	Cuba (CUB)	11	3	3	17
4	Bahamas (BAH)	7	3	0	10
5	Trinidad and Tobago (TTO)	5	7	3	15
6	Barbados (BAR)	4	2	0	6
7	Venezuela (VEN)	2	6	4	12
8	Dominican Republic (DOM)	1	1	1	3
9	Costa Rica (CRC)	0	2	1	3
10	El Salvador (ESA)	0	1	2	3
11	Panama (PAN)	0	0	1	1
Totals (11 entries)		57	57	51	165

== Participation (unofficial) ==
Detailed result lists can be found on the World Junior Athletics History website. An unofficial count yields the number of about 127 athletes from about 11 countries:

- Bahamas (8)
- Barbados (4)
- Costa Rica (2)
- Cuba (11)
- Dominican Republic (3)
- El Salvador (2)
- (Mexico) México (50)
- (Panama) Panamá (1)
- Puerto Rico (26)
- Trinidad and Tobago (11)
- Venezuela (9)
