= Sheila de Oliveira =

Brazilian sprinter

Personal information
- Full name: Sheila de Oliveira dos Santos
- Born: 18 February 1959 (age 67)

Sport
- Sport: Athletics
- Event(s): 100 m, 200 m
- Club: AAUGF
Medal record
Representing Brazil
Pan American Games
Bronze medal – third place	1987 Indianapolis	4x100m relay

Sheila de Oliveira dos Santos (born 18 February 1959) is a retired Brazilian sprinter. She represented her country in the 100 metres at the 1987 World Championships reaching the quarterfinals.

== International competitions ==
Year	Competition	Venue	Position	Event	Notes
Representing Brazil
1979	South American Championships	Bucaramanga, Colombia	4th	100 m	11.8
1979	South American Championships	Bucaramanga, Colombia	2nd	4 × 100 m relay	46.1
1979	Pan American Games	San Juan, Puerto Rico	7th	100 m	11.80
1979	Pan American Games	San Juan, Puerto Rico	9th (sf)	200 m	24.14
1979	Pan American Games	San Juan, Puerto Rico	4th	4 × 100 m relay	46.98
1981	Universiade	Bucharest, Romania	7th	100 m	11.80
1981	Universiade	Bucharest, Romania	11th (h)	200 m	24.00
1981	South American Championships	La Paz, Bolivia	4th	100 m	11.5
1981	South American Championships	La Paz, Bolivia	4th	200 m	24.2
1981	South American Championships	La Paz, Bolivia	1st	4 × 100 m relay	45.3
1981	South American Championships	La Paz, Bolivia	1st	4 × 400 m relay	3:49.4
1983	South American Championships	Santa Fe, Argentina	2nd	100 m	11.8
1983	South American Championships	Santa Fe, Argentina	2nd	200 m	24.9
1983	South American Championships	Santa Fe, Argentina	1st	4 × 100 m relay	45.4
1986	Ibero-American Championships	Havana, Cuba	3rd	100 m	11.93
1986	Ibero-American Championships	Havana, Cuba	4th	200 m	24.25 (w)
1986	Ibero-American Championships	Havana, Cuba	2nd	4 × 100 m relay	46.22
1987	Pan American Games	Indianapolis, United States	9th (sf)	100 m	11.57 (w)
1987	Pan American Games	Indianapolis, United States	10th (sf)	200 m	24.17
1987	Pan American Games	Indianapolis, United States	3rd	4 × 100 m relay	45.37
1987	World Championships	Rome, Italy	26th (qf)	100 m	11.76

== Personal bests ==
Outdoor

- 100 metres – 11.49 (+0.3 m/s, São Paulo 1984)
- 200 metres – 23.41 (-0.2 m/s, São Paulo 1984)
