= Nicoleta Căruțașu =

Romanian runner

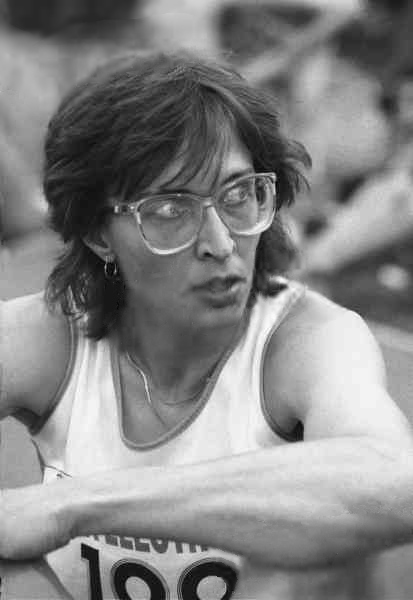
- Căruțașu in 1993

Personal information
- Born: 14 February 1964 (age 62)
- Height: 173 cm (5 ft 8 in)
- Weight: 64 kg (141 lb)

Sport
- Sport: Athletics
- Event: 400 metres hurdles

Achievements and titles
- Personal best: 54.94 (1993)
Medal record
Representing Romania
Summer Universiade
Silver medal – second place	1987 Zagreb	400 m hurdles
Silver medal – second place	1991 Sheffield	400 m hurdles

Nicoleta Căruțașu (née Vornicu, 14 February 1964) is a retired Romanian runner. She specialized in the 400 metres hurdles event, in which she won silver medals at the 1987 and 1991 Universiades. She also competed at the 1992 Summer Olympics, but failed to reach the final.
