= Yvette Wray =

English pentathlete, hurdler and sprinter

Yvette Luker née Wray
Personal information
- Nationality: British (English)
- Born: 18 October 1958 (age 68) Scraptoft, Leicestershire, England

Sport
- Sport: Athletics
- Event: pentathlon
- Club: Shrewsbury & District AC
Medal record
Athletics
Representing England
Commonwealth Games
Bronze medal – third place	1978 Edmonton	Pentathlon
Bronze medal – third place	1982 Brisbane	400 m hurdles
Representing Great Britain
Universiade
Silver medal – second place	1979 Mexico City	4 x 100 m
Silver medal – second place	1981 Bucharest	4 x 100 m

Yvette Julie Luker (née Wray, born 18 October 1958) is a female English former pentathlete, hurdler and sprinter. she competed for Great Britain at the Olympic Games in Moscow 1980. She also represented England at the Commonwealth Games in 1978 and 1982, winning two bronze medals.

== Career ==
Born in Scraptoft, Leicestershire, Wray at the age of 19, competed internationally for the first time at the 1978 Commonwealth Games and achieved immediate success, earning the bronze medal in the Pentathlon with a score of 4211 points. She competed later in the year at the European Athletics Championships, finishing 15th in the Pentathlon, although later disqualifications to other competitors due to doping violations promoted her to 13th place.

In 1979 Wray participated in the Summer Universiade and helped the British 4 × 100 m relay team achieve a silver medal, narrowly behind the Soviet Union team. Her performances internationally and domestically earned her a place in the Pentathlon at the 1980 Summer Olympics, where she finished 16th with 4159 points, one place behind fellow British pentathlete Sue Longden.

Wray competed in the 50 metre hurdles at the 1981 European Athletics Indoor Championships, but failed to progress beyond the semifinals. Later in the year however, Wray performed strongly at the Universiade, helping the British team to 4 × 100 m relay silver once again, just 0.2 s behind the United States team.

At the 1982 Commonwealth Games, Wray earned her second Commonwealth bronze medal, this time in the 400 m hurdles. She also contributed to the English 4 × 400 m relay team, but a mistake in her baton changeover with Gladys Taylor dropped England out of medal contention and they could only finish 4th. Later in the year Wray participated in the European Athletics Championships 400 m hurdles, where she was eliminated in the heats.

During her final year of international competition, Wray represented England, at the 1986 Commonwealth Games in Edinburgh, Scotland competing in the 1986 Commonwealth Games 400 m hurdles, reaching the final and finishing in 5th place. Her last international event was at the 1986 European Athletics Championships in the 400 m hurdles, but she failed to progress beyond the heats.

=== Domestic achievements ===
Throughout her career Wray achieved a lot of national success, particularly at the WAAA Championships where she won three British 400 m hurdles titles (1983 1985, 1986) and one 2nd-place finish (1982). She also claimed a 1st and two 2nd-place finishes in the pentathlon between 1977 and 1980, and a 2nd and 3rd-place finish in the 100 m hurdles in 1980 and 1978 respectively. At the Indoor AAA Championships Wray was dominant at the 60 m hurdles, taking the title from 1980 to 1982, as well as finishing second in 1979 and 1983. She also achieved a 2nd-place finish at the 400 metre sprint in 1984.

At the UK Athletics Championships, Wray won the 400 m hurdle title in 1986, to add the 3rd-place finish she had achieved in 1982. She also came 2nd in the 1979 100 m hurdles.

== Personal bests ==
- 400 metre hurdles – 56.46 s, 11 July 1981, Oslo
- Pentathlon – 4278 pts, July 15, 1979, Bremerhaven

== International Results ==
Year	Competition	Venue	Position	Event	Notes
Representing Great Britain
1978	European Championships	Prague, Czech Republic	13th	Pentathlon	4103 pts
1979	Universiade	Mexico City, Mexico	2nd	4 × 100 m relay	43.26
1980	Olympic Games	Moscow, Russia	16th	Pentathlon	4159 pts
1981	European Indoor Championships	Grenoble, France	Semifinal	50 m hurdles	7.03
1981	Universiade	Bucharest, Romania	2nd	4 × 100 m	43.86
1982	European Championships	Athens, Greece	Heats	400 m hurdles	57.81
1986	European Championships	Stuttgart, West Germany	Heats	400 m hurdles	57.89
Representing England
1978	Commonwealth Games	Edmonton, Canada	3rd	Pentathlon	4211 pts
1982	Commonwealth Games	Brisbane, Australia	3rd	400 m hurdles	57.17
1982	Commonwealth Games	Brisbane, Australia	4th	4 × 400 m relay	3:35.35
1986	Commonwealth Games	Edinburgh, United Kingdom	5th	400 m hurdles	57.59
