= Ana Ambrazienė =

Lithuanian hurdler (1955–2025)

Personal information
- Born: 14 April 1955 Tarakonys, Lithuanian SSR, USSR
- Died: 12 February 2025 (aged 69) Vilnius, Lithuania
Medal record
Women's athletics
Representing the Soviet Union
World Championships
Silver medal – second place	1983 Helsinki	400 m hurdles
Universiade
Gold medal – first place	1981 Bucharest	400 m hurdles
Gold medal – first place	1981 Bucharest	4×400 m relay

Ana Ambrazienė, née Ana Kostetskaya, (14 April 1955 – 12 February 2025), also known as Anna Kostecka, was a Lithuanian hurdler.

== Background ==
Ambrazienė she was born in Vilnius on 14 April 1955, and was of Polish descent. She died in Vilnius on 12 February 2025, at the age of 69.

== Career ==
Ambrazienė represented the Soviet Union in the 1970s and 1980s. Her personal best in the women's 400 m hurdles was 54.02 at a meet in Moscow on 11 June 1983. That mark was the standing world record for over a year.

In 1985, Ambrazienė graduated from the Lithuanian Institute of Physical Education. She became a physical education teacher from 1999 to 2006.

== Competition results ==
Year	Competition	Venue	Position	Event	Notes
Representing Soviet Union
1981	Summer Universiade	Bucharest, Romania	1st	400 m hurdles	55.52 GR
1981	Summer Universiade	Bucharest, Romania	1st	4 × 400 m relay	3:26.65
1982	European Championships	Athens, Greece	4th	400 m hurdles	55.09
1983	World Championships	Helsinki, Finland	2nd	400 m hurdles	54.15
1987	World Championships	Rome, Italy	6th	400 m hurdles	55.68
Representing Lithuania
1990	Lithuanian Championships	Lithuania	1st	400 m	52.4

== See also ==
- Women's 400 metres hurdles world record progression

Records
Preceded by Karin Roßley	Women's 400 m hurdles world record holder 11 June 1983 – 22 June 1984	Succeeded by Margarita Ponomaryova
Sporting positions
Preceded by Ann-Louise Skoglund	Women's 400 m hurdles best year performance 1983	Succeeded by Margarita Ponomaryova
