= Ruth Martin-Jones =

British long jumper, pentathlete and sprinter

Personal information
- Nationality: British (Welsh)
- Born: 28 January 1947 (age 79) Criccieth, Gwynedd, Wales

Sport
- Sport: Athletics
- Event(s): Long jumper, heptathlete
- Club: Birchfield Harriers
Medal record
Women's Athletics
Representing Wales
Commonwealth Games
Bronze medal – third place	1974 Christchurch	Long jump

Ruth Martin-Jones (also known as Ruth Swinhoe and Ruth Howell, born 28 January 1947) is a former long jumper and heptathlete.

== Biography ==
Martin–Jones, from Oswestry, attended the University of Birmingham, taking a French PhD. By 1972 she was teaching in Beaconsfield.

Martin–Jones competed at the 1970 British Commonwealth Games in Edinburgh. She finished third behind Sheila Sherwood in the long jump event and second behind Ann Wilson in the pentathlon at the 1972 WAAA Championships.

She competed for Great Britain at the 1972 Summer Olympics in Munich, finishing 28th in the long jump event. She was the first Welsh women to compete at the Olympic Games.

At the 1974 British Commonwealth Games in Christchurch, she won a bronze medal competing for Wales. Her jump was equal to silver medalist Brenda Eisler, but Eisler had a better second jump. later that Summer she became the British long jump champion after winning the British WAAA Championships title at the 1974 WAAA Championships.

Martin-Jones married Raymond Howell in late 1975 and competed under her married name of Howell thereafter. She attended her third Commonwealth Games at the 1978 Commonwealth Games in Edmonton, Canada, participating in the long jump and pentathlon events.

In 1978, Martin-Jones won the first heptathlon event in the world at the Alexander Stadium in Birmingham.

In 2016, Martin-Jones was inducted into the Welsh Athletics Hall of Fame.
