= Alice Jackson =

American sprinter (born 1958)

Personal information
- Nationality: American
- Born: 28 December 1958 (age 67)

Sport
- Country: United States
- Sport: Athletics
Medal record
Athletics
Representing United States
Pan American Games
Gold medal – first place	1983 Caracas	4 × 100 m relay
Gold medal – first place	1983 Caracas	4 × 400 m relay

Alice Jackson (born 28 December 1958) is a American sprinter. She attended Grambling State University through a track scholarship.

== Biography ==
Jackson competed in few notable competitive events during her career including the 1983 Pan American Games, 1987 IAAF World Indoor Championships and 1989 IAAF World Indoor Championships. She claimed gold medals in the women's 4 × 100 m and 4 × 400 m relay events during the 1983 Pan American Games.

Jackson served as an ambassador of Grambling State University as Miss Grambling State University.

As of 2022, Jackson heads the research on interactive computing and artificial intelligence at RTI International’s corporate innovation lab, Lab 58, as Director of Information Technology. She has previously worked at Coca-Cola, BellSouth, AT&T, and IBM.
