= Chuck Aragon =

American middle-distance runner

Personal information
- Nationality: American
- Born: March 29, 1959 (age 67) Los Lunas, New Mexico, U.S.

Sport
- Sport: Track
- Events: 1500 meters, mile
- College team: Notre Dame

Achievements and titles
- Personal bests: 800m: 1:46.34; 1500m: 3:34.7; Mile: 3:51.62
Medal record
Men's athletics
Representing United States
Pan American Games
Bronze medal – third place	1983 Caracas	Men's 1500 meters

Chuck Aragon (born March 29, 1959) is an American former middle-distance runner who specialized in the 1500 meters and the mile. After a successful collegiate career during which he became the first Notre Dame runner to break the four-minute mile barrier, he went on to run at an international level throughout the 1980s. He placed third overall in the men's 1500 meters at the 1983 Pan American Games. Aragon also represented the United States at the 1987 World Championships in Athletics, where he also ran in the men's 1500 meters.

== Running career ==
=== High school ===
Aragon attended high school at Los Lunas High School, during which he competed at multiple New Mexico state high school cross country and track meets, up to his graduation with the class of 1977. By the time he graduated high school, Aragon was a two-time New Mexico AAA high school cross country champion, in 1975 and 1976. A Los Lunas local, Ambrose Sanchez, took interest in Aragon's running. He once asked Aragon where he would like to go to college, and when Aragon told him he planned to attend University of New Mexico as an undergrad, Sanchez called Notre Dame coach Joe Piane and suggested that he scout Aragon. Piane visited Aragon, and Aragon was offered an athletics scholarship, which he accepted.

=== Collegiate ===
Thanks to the Sanchez-Piane collaboration, Aragon was recruited to Notre Dame. In academics, Aragon was interested in medicine, and intended to go into graduate studies after his undergrad years. In Notre Dame's track team, he started out as an 800-meter specialist, and was a member of Notre Dame's All-America 4x800-meter relay team in 1979. However, Joe Piane was convinced that Aragon had more potential in the 1500 meters and the mile, and eventually moved Aragon up from the 800 meter races. In February 1981, as a senior undergrad, Aragon ran the indoor mile in a competitive meet in Champaign, Illinois, during which he managed to kick ahead of John Gregorek right before the end of the race. Aragon's final result was 3:59.9, due to which Aragon became the first Notre Dame runner and New Mexico native to run a sub-4 minute mile.

=== International ===
After graduating from Notre Dame in 1981, Aragon continued training and was called up to run for the United States at the 1983 Pan American Games. There he ran the men's 1500 meters, and finished in third place behind countryman and Villanova runner Ross Donoghue. He qualified for the 1984 Olympic Trials for the men's 1500, which involved a loaded field including Steve Scott, Jim Spivey, and Sydney Maree. The 1984 men's 1500 trials ended up being a famous race, with Aragon lunging at the finish line and finishing fourth (with the first three runners making the Olympic team) with an incredible margin of 1/500th of a second behind third-placed Sydney Maree. Some observers attributed Aragon's narrow loss to Aragon lunging his body about a meter before the finish line, which some thought slowed him down in the critical moment. Aragon's last major international appearance was at the 1987 World Championships in Athletics, where he ran in the men's 1500 but did not make it the finals.

== Personal ==
Chuck's daughter, Dani, was also a member of the Notre Dame Track & Field team from 2012 to 2016. She is now a professional runner based in New York. She also ran Cross Country for the Fighting Irish. Another daughter, Christina, is also a runner.
