= Nawal El Moutawakel =

Moroccan 1984 Olympic champion and Minister of Sports

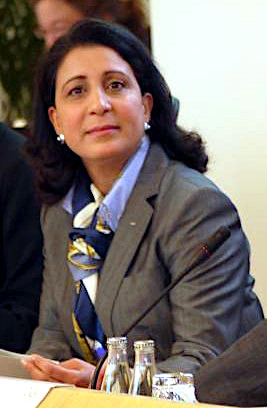

Personal information
- Born: 15 April 1962 (age 64) Casablanca, Morocco

Sport
- Sport: Track and field
Medal record
Representing Morocco
Olympic Games
Gold medal – first place	1984 Los Angeles	400 m hurdles
African Championships
Gold medal – first place	1982 Cairo	100 m hurdles
Gold medal – first place	1982 Cairo	400 m hurdles
Gold medal – first place	1984 Rabat	200 m
Gold medal – first place	1984 Rabat	400 m hurdles
Gold medal – first place	1985 Cairo	400 m hurdles
Silver medal – second place	1982 Cairo	100 m
Bronze medal – third place	1982 Cairo	4×400 m relay
Bronze medal – third place	1984 Rabat	4×400 m relay
Mediterranean Games
Gold medal – first place	1983 Casablanca	400 m hurdles
Gold medal – first place	1987 Latakia	400 m hurdles
Summer Universiade
Gold medal – first place	1987 Zagreb	400 m hurdles
Bronze medal – third place	1985 Kobe	400 m hurdles

Nawal El Moutawakel (Amazigh: ⵏⴰⵡⴰⵍ ⵍⵎⵓⵜⴰⵡⴰⵇⵇⵍ; Arabic: نوال المتوكل; born 15 April 1962) is a Moroccan former hurdler, who won the inaugural women's 400 metres hurdles event at the 1984 Summer Olympics, and is the first Moroccan, Arab, African, and Muslim woman to win an Olympic gold. She is currently a vice president of the International Olympic Committee. In August 2024, the International Sports Press Association (AIPS) voted her as the fourth best female athlete of the past 100 years after Serena Williams, Nadia Comăneci and Simone Biles. In 2007, El Moutawakel was named the Minister of Sports in the upcoming cabinet of Morocco.

== Life ==
El Moutawakel was born in Casablanca, and was studying at Iowa State University when she won her Olympic title, which came as a surprise in her home country. King Hassan II of Morocco telephoned her to give his congratulations, and he declared that all girls born the day of her victory were to be named in her honor. Her medal also meant the breakthrough for sporting women in Morocco and other mostly Muslim countries.

She was a pioneer for Muslim and African athletes in that she confounded long-held beliefs that women of such backgrounds could not succeed in athletics.

In 1993 she started running for fun, a 5 km run for women in Casablanca that has since become the biggest women's race held in a Muslim majority country, with up to 30,000 who came to run.

In 1995, El Moutawakel became a council member of the International Association of Athletics Federations (IAAF), now known as World Athletics, and in 1998 she became a member of the International Olympic Committee (IOC).

El Moutawakel is a member of the International Olympic Committee, and she was the president of the evaluation commissions for the selection of the host city for the Summer Olympics of 2012 and 2016. She was elected as a vice-president of the IOC in 2016 for a period of four years and re-elected in 2024.

In 2006, El Moutawakel was one of the eight honored to bear the Olympic flag at the 2006 Winter Olympics Opening Ceremony in Turin, Italy. On 26 July 2012, she carried the London Olympics torch through Westminster.

El Moutawakel was one of the ambassadors of the Morocco 2026 FIFA World Cup bid.

== International competitions ==
Representing Morocco
Year	Competition	Venue	Position	Event	Notes
1979	Mediterranean Games	Split, Yugoslavia	6th	100 m	12.13
1979	Mediterranean Games	Split, Yugoslavia	5th	200 m	24.64
1981	Universiade	Bucharest, Romania	15th (sf)	100 m	12.18
1981	Universiade	Bucharest, Romania	16th (h)	200 m	24.23
1981	Arab Championships	Tunis, Tunisia	1st	100 m	11.86
1981	Arab Championships	Tunis, Tunisia	1st	200 m	24.30
1981	World Cup	Rome, Italy	8th	100 m	11.92^{1}
1981	World Cup	Rome, Italy	7th	4 × 100 m relay	46.15^{1}
1982	African Championships	Cairo, Egypt	2nd	100 m	11.7
1982	African Championships	Cairo, Egypt	1st	100 m hurdles	13.8
1982	African Championships	Cairo, Egypt	1st	400 m hurdles	58.42
1982	African Championships	Cairo, Egypt	3rd	4 × 400 m relay	3:47.40
1983	Universiade	Edmonton, Alberta	–	400 m hurdles	DQ
1983	Maghreb Championships	Casablanca, Morocco	1st	200 m	24.0
1983	Maghreb Championships	Casablanca, Morocco	1st	100 m hurdles	13.4
1983	Maghreb Championships	Casablanca, Morocco	1st	400 m hurdles	58.5
1983	World Championships	Helsinki, Finland	33rd (h)	100 m hurdles	14.85
1983	World Championships	Helsinki, Finland	12th (sf)	400 m hurdles	57.10
1983	Mediterranean Games	Casablanca, Morocco	1st	400 m hurdles	56.59
1983	Mediterranean Games	Casablanca, Morocco	3rd	4 × 100 m relay	46.69
1983	Mediterranean Games	Casablanca, Morocco	4th	4 × 400 m relay	3:38.87
1984	African Championships	Rabat, Morocco	1st	200 m	23.93
1984	African Championships	Rabat, Morocco	1st	400 m hurdles	56.01
1984	African Championships	Rabat, Morocco	3rd	4 × 400 m relay	3:54.41
1984	Olympic Games	Los Angeles, United States	1st	400 m hurdles	54.61
1985	African Championships	Cairo, Egypt	1st	400 m hurdles	56.00
1985	Universiade	Kobe, Japan	3rd	400 m hurdles	55.59
1985	World Cup	Canberra, Australia	4th	400 m hurdles	56.05^{1}
1985	World Cup	Canberra, Australia	7th	4 × 400 m relay	3:36.86^{1}
1987	Arab Championships	Algiers, Algeria	1st	200 m	24.33
1987	Arab Championships	Algiers, Algeria	1st	400 m	54.28
1987	Arab Championships	Algiers, Algeria	1st	400 m hurdles	59.93
1987	Universiade	Zagreb, Yugoslavia	1st	400 m hurdles	55.21
1987	World Championships	Rome, Italy	18th (h)	400 m hurdles	57.21
1987	Mediterranean Games	Latakia, Syria	1st	400 m hurdles	56.28

^{1}Representing Africa

== See also ==
- Politics of Morocco
- Sport in Morocco

Preceded by Dot Richardson	Flo Hyman Memorial Award; 2003	Succeeded by Kristi Yamaguchi
