= Athletics at the 1975 Pan American Games – Women's 1500 metres =

Women's 1500 metres at the Pan American Games

The women's 1500 metres event at the 1975 Pan American Games was held in Mexico City on 19 October. It was the first time that this event was contested by women at the Games.

== Results ==
| Rank | Name | Nationality | Time | Notes |
|---|---|---|---|---|
| 1st place, gold medalist(s) | Jan Merrill | United States | 4:18.32 | |
| 2nd place, silver medalist(s) | Thelma Wright | Canada | 4:22.32 | |
| 3rd place, bronze medalist(s) | Abby Hoffman | Canada | 4:26.25 | |
| 4 | Cindy Bremser | United States | 4:31.73 | |
| 5 | Ana María Nielsen | Argentina | 4:37.80 | |
| 6 | Thelma Zúñiga | Costa Rica | 4:48.67 | |
| 7 | Ileana Hocking | Puerto Rico | 4:51.47 | |
| 8 | Evasol Vallejo | Mexico | 4:57.61 | |
| 9 | María Acevedo | Dominican Republic | 5:04.88 | |
| 10 | Lydia González | Puerto Rico | 5:41.66 | |
| | Charlotte Bradley | Mexico | DNS | |
