= Ross Donoghue =

American middle-distance runner

Personal information
- Nationality: American
- Born: July 19, 1959 (age 67) Oswego, New York, U.S.

Sport
- Sport: Track
- Events: 1500 meters, mile
- College team: Villanova

Achievements and titles
- Personal bests: 1500m: 3:36.95; Mile: 3:55.26; 5000m: 13:33.37
Medal record
Men's athletics
Representing United States
Pan American Games
Silver medal – second place	1983 Caracas	Men's 1500 meters

Ross Donoghue (born July 19, 1959) is an American former middle-distance runner who specialized in the 1500 meters and the mile. He first rose to prominence as a standout high school runner with Bishop Cunningham High School from Oswego, New York. He was recruited by Villanova, where he would establish himself as one of the most prolific 1500-meter and mile-specialists in the school's history. Donoghue represented the United States at the 1983 Pan American Games, where he finished second overall in the men's 1500 meters. Over the course of his competitive career, he ran under four minutes in the mile on eight occasions.

== Running career ==
=== High school ===
Donoghue attended Bishop Cunningham High School up to his graduation in the class of 1977. On November 20, 1976, he ran his last cross country race as a high schooler at the New York State Federation meet, where he placed first out of 550 runners on a 3-mile course, recording a time of 15:06.

=== Collegiate ===
Donoghue first competed for the St. John's Red Storm track and field team, but later transferred to the Villanova Wildcats. During his spell at Villanova, Donoghue was the men's 1500 meter Big East (both indoor and outdoor) champion in 1982. Although he specialized in the 1500 and the mile, he also had experience in the shorter distances, and recorded a personal best of 1:48.0 in the 800 meters while at Villanova.

=== Post-collegiate ===
Donoghue continued to train for the 1500 meters and the mile after college, and was called up to the US track team for the 1983 Pan American Games. There he finished second in the 1500 meters ahead of countryman Chuck Aragon, but was edged out by Brazilian champion Agberto Guimarães. He ran at the 1984 US Olympic Trials in the men's 1500 meters, won his preliminary heat, and subsequently pulled out of the finals in the trials due to a pain in the heel.
