= Alejandra Ramos (runner) =

Chilean runner (born 1958)

Personal information
- Born: December 8, 1958 (age 67)

Sport
- Sport: Track and field
Medal record
Representing Chile
Pan American Games
| Bronze medal – third place | 1983 Caracas | 800 m |
South American Games
| Gold medal – first place | 1978 La Paz | 400 m |

Alejandra Purísima Ramos Sánchez (born December 8, 1958) is a retired middle-distance runner from Chile.

She competed for her native South American country at the 1984 Summer Olympics in Los Angeles, California. Ramos obtained a personal best time of 4:13.07 in the 1,500 metres event in 1990. She also achieved a Chilean National Record in the 800 metres event in 1990 with a time of 2:00.20.

== International competitions ==
| Year | Competition | Venue | Position | Event | Notes |
Representing Chile
| 1972 | South American Junior Championships | Asunción, Paraguay | 4th | 4 × 100 m relay | 51.6 |
| 1972 | South American Junior Championships | Asunción, Paraguay | 2nd | 4 × 400 m relay | 4:19.5 |
| 1974 | South American Junior Championships | Lima, Peru | 3rd | 400 m | 56.4 |
| 1974 | South American Junior Championships | Lima, Peru | 1st | 800 m | 2:12.6 |
| 1974 | South American Junior Championships | Lima, Peru | 5th | 4 × 100 m relay | 48.6 |
| 1974 | South American Junior Championships | Lima, Peru | 4th | 4 × 400 m relay | 4:04.4 |
| 1975 | South American Championships | Rio de Janeiro, Brazil | 1st | 400 m | 55.7 |
| 1975 | South American Championships | Rio de Janeiro, Brazil | 3rd | 800 m | 2:12.1 |
| 1975 | Pan American Games | Mexico City, Mexico | 9th (h) | 400 m | 56.06 |
| 1976 | South American Junior Championships | Maracaibo, Venezuela | 1st | 400 m | 55.33 |
| 1976 | South American Junior Championships | Maracaibo, Venezuela | 1st | 800 m | 2:10.14 |
| 1976 | South American Junior Championships | Maracaibo, Venezuela | 1st | 1500 m | 4:45.11 |
| 1977 | South American Championships | Montevideo, Uruguay | 1st | 800 m | 2:12.3 |
| 1977 | South American Championships | Montevideo, Uruguay | 1st | 1500 m | 4:39.8 |
| 1977 | South American Championships | Montevideo, Uruguay | 4th | 4 × 400 m relay | 3:55.9 |
| 1978 | South American Games | La Paz, Bolivia | 1st | 400 m | 56.68 A |
| 1979 | South American Championships | Bucaramanga, Colombia | 1st | 800 m | 2:04.2 |
| 1979 | South American Championships | Bucaramanga, Colombia | 1st | 1500 m | 4:23.2 |
| 1979 | South American Championships | Bucaramanga, Colombia | 2nd | 4 × 400 m relay | 3:44.6 |
| 1980 | Liberty Bell Classic | Philadelphia, United States | 8th | 800 m | 2:10.12 |
| 1983 | Pan American Games | Caracas, Venezuela | 3rd | 800 m | 2:03.65 |
| 1983 | Pan American Games | Caracas, Venezuela | 4th | 1500 m | 4:25.59 |
| 1983 | Ibero-American Championships | Barcelona, Spain | 2nd | 800 m | 2:03.17 |
| 1983 | Ibero-American Championships | Barcelona, Spain | 2nd | 1500 m | 4:16.33 |
| 1983 | South American Championships | Santa Fe, Argentina | 1st | 800 m | 2:04.6 |
| 1983 | South American Championships | Santa Fe, Argentina | 1st | 1500 m | 4:25.3 |
| 1983 | South American Championships | Santa Fe, Argentina | 2nd | 4 × 400 m relay | 3:45.3 |
| 1984 | Olympic Games | Los Angeles, United States | 18th (h) | 800 m | 2:05.77 |
| 1984 | Olympic Games | Los Angeles, United States | 18th (h) | 1500 m | 4:22.03 |
| 1985 | South American Championships | Santiago, Chile | 1st | 800 m | 2:03.5 |
| 1985 | South American Championships | Santiago, Chile | 1st | 1500 m | 4:20.16 |
| 1985 | South American Championships | Santiago, Chile | 3rd | 4 × 400 m relay | 3:43.85 |
| 1985 | Universiade | Kobe, Japan | 6th | 1500 m | 4:13.09 |
| 1986 | Ibero-American Championships | La Habana, Cuba | 4th | 800 m | 2:04.72 |
| 1986 | Ibero-American Championships | La Habana, Cuba | 1st | 1500 m | 4:22.34 |
| 1987 | World Indoor Championships | Indianapolis, United States | 15th (h) | 800 m | 2:08.42 |
| 1990 | Ibero-American Championships | Manaus, Brazil | 2nd | 800 m | 2:02.37 |
| 1990 | Ibero-American Championships | Manaus, Brazil | 1st | 1500 m | 4:13.07 |
| 1993 | World Indoor Championships | Toronto, Canada | 9th | 3000 m | 9:15.22 |
| 1993 | South American Championships | Lima, Peru | 2nd | 1500 m | 4:31.40 |
| 1993 | South American Championships | Lima, Peru | 3rd | 3000 m | 9:52.1 |
