= Richard Rock (long jumper) =

Canadian athlete (born 1957)

Personal information
- Nationality: Canadian
- Born: 6 November 1957 (age 68) Reading, England

Sport
- Sport: Athletics
- Event: Long jump
- Club: Scarborough Optimist Track & Field Club

Richard Rock (born 6 November 1957) is a Canadian athlete. He competed in the men's long jump at the 1976 Summer Olympics.

Rock competed for the Southern Illinois Salukis track and field team in the NCAA.
