= Carla Mercurio =

Italian sprinter

Personal information
- Nationality: Italian
- Born: 26 October 1960 (age 65) Pescara, Italy
- Height: 1.64 m (5 ft 4 1/2 in)
- Weight: 52 kg (115 lb)

Sport
- Country: Italy
- Sport: Athletics
- Event: Sprint
- Club: Libertas Aterno Pescara

Achievements and titles
- Personal bests: 100 m: 11.41 (1985); 200 m: 23.42 (1986)
Medal record
Summer Universiade
Bronze medal – third place	1981 Bucharest	4x100 m relay

Carla Mercurio (born 26 October 1960, Pescara) is an Italian former sprinter.

== Biography ==
Carla Mercurio had 25 caps in national team from 1980 to 1986.

== Achievements ==
Year	Competition	Venue	Position	Event	Performance	Note
1981	Universiade	(Romania) Bucharest	3rd	4 × 100 m relay	44.43	
1983	World Championships	(Finland) Helsinki	SF	4 × 100 m relay	44.46	

== National championships ==
In the Marisa Masullo era, Carla Mercurio has won just one time the individual national championship.

- 1 win on 200 metres (1984)

== See also ==
- Italy national relay team
