= Ranza Clark =

Canadian middle-distance runner

Ranza Clark (married Boileau; born December 13, 1961, in Calgary, Alberta) is a retired middle distance runner from Canada, who won the gold medal in the women's 1.500 metres at the 1983 Pan American Games. She represented her native country at the 1984 Summer Olympics, finishing in 15th place in the women's 800 metres.

Clark competed in the AIAW for the Oregon Ducks track and field team, finishing 8th in the 800 m at the 1981 AIAW Outdoor Track and Field Championships.

== Achievements ==
Year	Tournament	Venue	Result	Extra
Representing Canada
1983	Pan American Games	Caracas, Venezuela	1st	1.500m
1983	Pan American Games	Caracas, Venezuela	2nd	800m
1984	Olympic Games	Los Angeles, California	15th	800m
