= Yekaterina Fesenko =

Russian athlete (born 1958)

Personal information
- Native name: Екатерина Фесенко-Грунь
- Full name: Yekaterina Fesenko-Grun
- Born: August 8, 1958 (age 67) Krasnodar, Russian SFSR, Soviet Union
- Height: 1.68 m (5 ft 6 in)
- Weight: 57 kg (126 lb)
Medal record
Women's athletics
Representing the Soviet Union
World Championships
Gold medal – first place	1983 Helsinki	400 m hurdles
Universiade
Gold medal – first place	1983 Edmonton	400 m hurdles

Yekaterina Fesenko (Russian: Екатерина Фесенко, born August 8, 1958) is a Russian athlete who competed for the USSR. She was born in Krasnodar. After her marriage in 1992, she appeared in the charts under the name of Yekaterina Grun or Yekaterina Fesenko-Grun (Russian: Екатерина Фесенко-Грунь).

== Career ==
Fesenko was USSR champion 400 meter hurdles starting in 1980. In the 1982 European Championships, she placed seventh in 55.86. In 1983, she won titles in the 400 m hurdles and as part of the Soviet 4 × 400 meter relay team at the Universiade. Later that season, at the inaugural 1983 World Championships in Athletics she won the title in 54.14, one hundredth of a second ahead of her compatriot Ana Ambrazienė, who had previously set the world record at 54.02 in June of that year.

In 1984 she was unable to compete in the Olympics because of the Soviet led 1984 Summer Olympics boycott.

In competition, her weight was 57 kilograms (126 lb) and her height was 1.68 metres (5 ft 6 in)

== Personal bests ==
- 400 m: 52.26 (1980)
- 400 m Hurdles: 54.14 (1983)
