= Nery McKeen =

Cuban middle-distance runner

Personal information
- Born: April 26, 1957 (age 69)

Sport
- Sport: Track and field
Medal record
Representing Cuba
Pan American Games
Gold medal – first place	1983 Caracas	800m
Silver medal – second place	1979 San Juan	4x400m relay
Central American and Caribbean Games
Gold medal – first place	1982 Havana	800m
Gold medal – first place	1982 Havana	4x400m relay
Gold medal – first place	1986 Santiago	4x400m relay
Bronze medal – third place	1978 Medellin	800m
Bronze medal – third place	1986 Santiago	1500m

Nery María McKeen León (born April 26, 1957) is a retired Cuban middle-distance runner who specialized in the 800 metres. She won the gold medal at the 1983 Pan American Games.

Her personal best time was 2.00.23 minutes, achieved in June 1985 in Prague.

== International competitions ==
Year	Competition	Venue	Position	Event	Notes
Representing Cuba
1978	Central American and Caribbean Games	Medellín, Colombia	3rd	800 m	2:04.48
1979	Pan American Games	San Juan, Puerto Rico	5th	800 m	2:05.4
1981	Central American and Caribbean Championships	Santo Domingo, Dominican Republic	2nd	800 m	2:07.13
1981	Universiade	Bucharest, Romania	11th (h)	800 m	2:04.05
1982	Central American and Caribbean Games	Havana, Cuba	1st	800 m	2:04.22
1982	Central American and Caribbean Games	Havana, Cuba	1st	4 × 400 m relay	3:35.22
1983	Central American and Caribbean Championships	Havana, Cuba	1st	800 m	2:04.26
1983	Central American and Caribbean Championships	Havana, Cuba	1st	4 × 400 m relay	3:34.97
1983	Pan American Games	Caracas, Venezuela	1st	800 m	2:02.20
1983	Ibero-American Championships	Barcelona, Spain	1st	800 m	2:03.07
1983	Ibero-American Championships	Barcelona, Spain	1st	4 × 400 m relay	3:38.94
1984	Friendship Games	Prague, Czechoslovakia	11th	800 m	2:02.74
1985	Central American and Caribbean Championships	Nassau, Bahamas	2nd	800 m	2:04.10
1985	Central American and Caribbean Championships	Nassau, Bahamas	2nd	1500 m	4:25.03
1986	Central American and Caribbean Games	Santiago, Dom. Rep.	5th	800 m	2:04.66
1986	Central American and Caribbean Games	Santiago, Dom. Rep.	3rd	1500 m	4:23.34
1986	Central American and Caribbean Games	Santiago, Dom. Rep.	1st	4 × 400 m relay	3:33.60
1986	Ibero-American Championships	La Habana, Cuba	3rd	800 m	2:03.07
1986	Ibero-American Championships	La Habana, Cuba	5th	1500 m	4:25.79
1986	Ibero-American Championships	La Habana, Cuba	1st	4 × 400 m relay	3:33.70
