= Christine Slythe-Wynn =

Canadian hurdler

Personal information
- Nationality: Canadian
- Born: 10 August 1961 (age 64) Oakville, Ontario, Canada

Sport
- Sport: Track and field
- Events: 400 metres hurdles, 800 metres
Medal record
Representing Canada
Pan American Games
Silver medal – second place	1983 Caracas	4x400m relay

Christine Slythe-Wynn (born 10 August 1961) is a Canadian former athlete. She competed in the 800 metres at the 1984 Summer Olympics and in the 400 metres hurdles at the 1988 Summer Olympics.

Competing for the LSU Lady Tigers track and field team, Slythe-Wynn won the 1985 1000 meters at the NCAA Division I Indoor Track and Field Championships in a time of 2:42.23.
