= Judi Brown Clarke =

American politician and former athlete

Personal information
- Born: Judith Lynne Brown; July 14, 1961 (age 65) Milwaukee, Wisconsin, U.S.
Medal record
Women's athletics
Representing the United States
Olympic Games
Silver medal – second place	1984 Los Angeles	400 m hurdles
Pan American Games
Gold medal – first place	1983 Caracas	400 m hurdles
Gold medal – first place	1987 Indianapolis	400 m hurdles

Judith Lynne Brown Clarke (née Brown, formerly Brown-King, born July 14, 1961) is an American politician and former athlete who competed mainly in the 400 metre hurdles. She is the 1984 Olympic silver medalist and two-time Pan American Games champion. She later was a member of the Lansing, Michigan City Council.

== Sports career ==
Born in Milwaukee, Wisconsin, Clarke (under the name Judi Brown) won the gold medal in the 400m hurdles at the 1983 Pan American Games, finishing ahead of her team-mate Sharrieffa Barksdale. In 1984, she won her first US national 400m hurdles title before going on to win the silver medal in the event at the 1984 Summer Olympics in Los Angeles, finishing behind Nawal El Moutawakel. Under her then married name of Judi Brown King, she won three more US 400m hurdles titles from 1985 to 1987 and successfully defended her Pan American Games title in 1987, finishing ahead of Sandra Farmer. She was also a twelve-time Big Ten champion in track and field events during her career. In 1987, she was selected Sportsman of the Year by Sports Illustrated magazine for her community involvement.

== Education ==
Clarke holds two degrees from Michigan State University, a Bachelor's degree in Audiology and Speech Science, and a Master's degree in Education. She was inducted into the Michigan State University Hall of Fame in 1986. She holds a Ph.D. in Public Administration and Public Policy from Western Michigan University, from which she graduated with honors.

== Political career ==
Clarke was elected to the Lansing, Michigan City Council in 2013 and remained in office until 2017, and unsuccessfully ran for mayor of Lansing in the 2017 election.

== International competitions ==
All results regarding 400m hurdles

Year	Competition	Venue	Position	Notes
Representing United States
1983	Pan American Games	Caracas, Venezuela	1st	56.03
1983	World Championships	Helsinki, Finland	14th (sf)	57.98
1984	Olympic Games	Los Angeles, United States	2nd	55.20
1985	Grand Prix Final	Rome, Italy	1st	54.38
1985	World Cup	Canberra, Australia	2nd	55.10
1986	Goodwill Games	Moscow, Soviet Union	6th	56.06
1987	Pan American Games	Indianapolis, United States	1st	54.23
1987	World Championships	Rome, Italy	8th	56.10
(sf) Indicates overall position in semifinal round.

== Notes ==
- Evans, Hilary; Gjerde, Arild; Heijmans, Jeroen; Mallon, Bill; et al. "Judi Brown Clarke". Olympics at Sports-Reference.com. Sports Reference LLC. Archived from the original on 2020-04-17.
- USATF 400 Hurdles list
- USATF Olympic Trials Champions
