= Sharrieffa Barksdale =

American hurdler (born 1961)

Personal information
- Born: February 16, 1961 (age 65) Harriman, Tennessee, United States

Sport
- Sport: Track and field
Medal record
Representing United States
Pan American Games
Silver medal – second place	1983 Caracas	400m hurdles

Sharrieffa Barksdale (born February 16, 1961) is an American hurdler. She was born in Harriman, Tennessee. She competed at the 1984 Summer Olympics in Los Angeles, where she reached the semi-finals in women's 400 m hurdles. Barksdale owns one on one training academy. Barksdale was an American record holder in 400 m hurdles. Sharrieffa Barksdale is a member of Sigma Gamma Rho.

She also represented her country at the 1983 World Championships in Athletics and was a silver medalist at the 1983 Pan American Games. She was the national champion at the USA Outdoor Track and Field Championships that same year. She was an All-American athlete at the University of Tennessee.
