= Andrea Page =

Canadian hurdler (born 1956)

Personal information
- Born: 4 September 1956 (age 69) Windsor, Ontario, Canada

Sport
- Sport: Track and field
- Event: 400 metres hurdles

Andrea Page (born 4 September 1956) is a Canadian former hurdler. She competed in the women's 400 metres hurdles at the 1984 Summer Olympics.
