= Athletics at the 1983 Pan American Games =

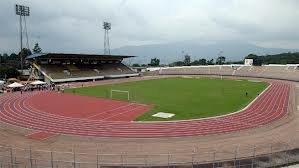
- Dates: 23–28 August
- Host city: Caracas, Venezuela
- Venue: Estadio Olímpico
- Level: Senior
- Events: 40
- Participation: 340 athletes from 27 nations

The athletics competition at the 1983 Pan American Games was held at the Estadio Olímpico in Caracas, Venezuela, between 23 and 28 August.

== Medal summary ==
=== Men's Events ===
Event	Gold		Silver		Bronze	
100 metres (wind: +2.0 m/s)	Leandro Peñalver; Cuba	10.06	Sam Graddy; United States	10.18	Osvaldo Lara; Cuba	10.21
200 metres (wind: -1.3 m/s)	Elliott Quow; United States	20.42	Leandro Peñalver; Cuba	20.53	Bernie Jackson; United States	20.81
400 metres	Cliff Wiley; United States	45.02	Lázaro Martínez; Cuba	45.37	Gérson de Souza; Brazil	45.45
800 metres	Agberto Guimarães; Brazil	1:46.31	José Luíz Barbosa; Brazil	1:46.65	Stanley Redwine; United States	1:47.26
1500 metres	Agberto Guimarães; Brazil	3:42.91	Ross Donoghue; United States	3:43.09	Chuck Aragon; United States	3:44.57
5000 metres	Eduardo Castro; Mexico	13:54.11	Gerardo Alcalá; Mexico	13:54.37	Domingo Tibaduiza; Colombia	13:59.68
10,000 metres	José Gómez; Mexico	29:14.75	Domingo Tibaduiza; Colombia	29:17.12	Mark Nenow; United States	29:22.46
Marathon	Jorge González; Puerto Rico	2:12:43 (NR)	César Mercado; Puerto Rico	2:20:30	Miguel Cruz; Mexico	2:21:12
3000 metres steeplechase	Emilio Ulloa; Chile	8:57.62	Carmelo Ríos; Puerto Rico	9:01.47	Greg Duhaime; Canada	9:06.03
110 metres hurdles (wind: -3.2 m/s)	Roger Kingdom; United States	13.44	Alejandro Casañas; Cuba	13.51	Tonie Campbell; United States	13.54
400 metres hurdles	Frank Montiéh; Cuba	50.02	Antônio Dias Ferreira; Brazil	50.08	James King; United States	50.31
4 × 100 metres relay	United States; Sam Graddy; Bernie Jackson; Ken Robinson; Elliott Quow	38.49	Cuba; Osvaldo Lara; Leandro Peñalver; Silvio Leonard; José Isalgue	38.55	Brazil; Gérson de Souza; João Batista da Silva; Nelson dos Santos; Robson da Silva	39.08
4 × 400 metres relay	United States; Alonzo Babers; Mike Bradley; James Rolle; Eddie Carey	3:00.47	Brazil; Evaldo da Silva; José Luíz Barbosa; Agberto Guimarães; Gérson de Souza	3:02.79	Cuba; Lázaro Martínez; Agustín Pavó; Carlos Reyté; Héctor Herrera	3:03.15
20 kilometres walk	Ernesto Canto; Mexico	1:28:12	Raúl González; Mexico	1:29:21	Héctor Moreno; Colombia	1:30:05
50 kilometres walk	Raúl González; Mexico	4:00:45	Martín Bermúdez; Mexico	4:04:20	Querubín Moreno; Colombia	4:23:20
High jump	Francisco Centelles; Cuba	2.29	Leo Williams; United States	2.27	Jorge Alfaro; Cuba	2.25
Pole vault	Mike Tully; United States	5.45	Jeff Buckingham; United States	5.25	Tomás Valdemar Hintnaus; Brazil	5.20
Long jump	Jaime Jefferson; Cuba	8.03A	Vesco Bradley; United States	7.99	Juan Felipe Ortiz; Cuba	7.91
Triple jump	Jorge Reyna; Cuba	17.05	Lázaro Betancourt; Cuba	16.75	José Salazar; Venezuela	16.26
Shot put	Luis Delís; Cuba	18.24	Gert Weil; Chile	17.30	Hubert Maingot; Trinidad and Tobago	16.48
Discus throw	Luis Delís; Cuba	67.32	Bradley Cooper; Bahamas	62.38	Juan Martínez; Cuba	62.04
Hammer throw	Genovevo Morejón; Cuba	65.34	Harold Willers; Canada	64.22	Alfredo Luis; Cuba	63.16
Javelin throw	Laslo Babits; Canada	81.40	Ramón González; Cuba	78.34	Amado Morales; Puerto Rico	77.40
Decathlon	Dave Steen; Canada	7958	Douglas Fernández; Venezuela	7726 (NR)	Freddy Aberdeen; Venezuela	7262

=== Women's Events ===
Event	Gold		Silver		Bronze	
100 metres (wind: -2.7 m/s)	Esmeralda de Jesus Garcia; Brazil	11.31	Jackie Washington; United States	11.33	Luisa Ferrer; Cuba	11.38
200 metres (wind: -0.8 m/s)	Randy Givens; United States	23.14	LaShon Nedd; United States	23.39	Luisa Ferrer; Cuba	23.39
400 metres	Charmaine Crooks; Canada	51.49	Ana Fidelia Quirot; Cuba	51.83	Easter Gabriel; United States	52.45
800 metres	Nery McKeen; Cuba	2:02.20	Ranza Clark; Canada	2:02.44	Alejandra Ramos; Chile	2:03.65
1500 metres	Ranza Clark; Canada	4:16.18	Cindy Bremser; United States	4:17.67	Missy Kane; United States	4:21.39
3000 metres	Joan Benoit; United States	9:14.19	Brenda Webb; United States	9:28.69	Monica Regonesi; Chile	9:41.87
100 metres hurdles (wind: -0.9 m/s)	Benita Fitzgerald; United States	13.16	Kim Turner; United States	13.39	Elida Aveillé; Cuba	13.41
400 metres hurdles	Judi Brown; United States	56.03	Sharrieffa Barksdale; United States	56.09	Gwen Wall; Canada	56.93
4 × 100 metres relay	United States; Alice Jackson; Jackie Washington; Brenda Cliette; Randy Givens	43.21	Trinidad and Tobago; Gillian Forde; Janice Bernard; Esther Hope; Angela Williams	44.63	Canada; Karen Nelson; Tanya Brothers; Charmaine Crooks; Jillian Richardson	44.77
4 × 400 metres relay	United States; Alice Jackson; Judi Brown; Easter Gabriel; Kelia Bolton	3:29.97	Canada; Andrea Page; Gwen Wall; Christine Slythe; Jillian Richardson	3:30.24	Cuba; Mayra Guerra; Nery McKeen; Mercedes Álvarez; Ana Fidelia Quirot	3:30.76
High jump	Coleen Sommer; United States	1.91	Silvia Costa; Cuba	1.88	Joni Huntley; United States	1.82
Long jump	Kathy McMillan; United States	6.70	Eloína Echevarría; Cuba	6.61	Pat Johnson; United States	6.33
Shot put	María Elena Sarría; Cuba	19.34	Lorna Griffin; United States	16.61	Rosemarie Hauch; Canada	16.38
Discus throw	Maritza Martén; Cuba	59.62	Lorna Griffin; United States	56.52	Penny Neer; United States	53.32
Javelin throw	María Caridad Colón; Cuba	63.76	Mayra Vila; Cuba	63.32	Marieta Riera; Venezuela	53.60
Heptathlon	Conceição Geremias; Brazil	6084	Cindy Greiner; United States	6068	Elida Aveillé; Cuba	5755

== Medal table ==
Rank	Nation	Gold	Silver	Bronze	Total
1	United States (USA)	14	14	11	39
2	Cuba (CUB)	12	10	11	33
3	Canada (CAN)	4	3	4	11
4	Brazil (BRA)	4	3	3	10
5	Mexico (MEX)	4	3	1	8
6	Puerto Rico (PUR)	1	2	1	4
7	Chile (CHI)	1	1	2	4
8	Colombia (COL)	0	1	3	4
8	Venezuela (VEN)	0	1	3	4
10	Trinidad and Tobago (TTO)	0	1	1	2
11	Bahamas (BAH)	0	1	0	1
Totals (11 entries)		40	40	40	120

== Participating nations ==
- Antigua and Barbuda (15)
- Argentina (8)
- Bahamas (4)
- Barbados (2)
- Brazil (20)
- Canada (34)
- Chile (7)
- Colombia (9)
- Cuba (47)
- Dominican Republic (8)
- Ecuador (1)
- Guatemala (2)
- Guyana (2)
- Honduras (2)
- Jamaica (9)
- Mexico (10)
- Nicaragua (4)
- Panama (4)
- Paraguay (1)
- Peru (1)
- Puerto Rico (12)
- El Salvador (1)
- Trinidad and Tobago (17)
- United States (63)
- Virgin Islands (4)
- Uruguay (4)
- Venezuela (49)

== See also ==
- 1983 in athletics (track and field)
