= List of international medallists in men's 100 metres =

The men's 100 metres is a sprint event in the sport of athletics which features in all international level competitions that include track and field. Per standard rules for individual competitions, medals are awarded to the top three finishers in international 100 m finals. There are two global-level competitions: the 100 metres at the Olympics and the 100 metres at the World Athletics Championships. Beyond that the 100 m is contested in continental-level athletics championships and multi-sport events, as well as regional and community-based international competitions.

This list includes men's 100 m medallists in non-team-based international competitions that are open class, which indicates there are no restrictions on age, disability, occupation, or other affiliations beyond nationality.

== Olympic Games ==
Games	Gold	Silver	Bronze
1896 Athens	Thomas Burke; United States	Fritz Hofmann; Germany	Francis Lane; United States
1896 Athens	Thomas Burke; United States	Fritz Hofmann; Germany	Alajos Szokolyi; Hungary
1900 Paris	Frank Jarvis; United States	Walter Tewksbury; United States	Stan Rowley; Australia
1904 St. Louis	Archie Hahn; United States	Nathaniel Cartmell; United States	William Hogenson; United States
1908 London	Reggie Walker; South Africa	James Rector; United States	Robert Kerr; Canada
1912 Stockholm	Ralph Craig; United States	Alvah Meyer; United States	Donald Lippincott; United States
1920 Antwerp	Charley Paddock; United States	Morris Kirksey; United States	Harry Edward; Great Britain
1924 Paris	Harold Abrahams; Great Britain	Jackson Scholz; United States	Arthur Porritt, Baron Porritt; New Zealand
1928 Amsterdam	Percy Williams; Canada	Jack London (athlete); Great Britain	Georg Lammers; Germany
1932 Los Angeles	Eddie Tolan; United States	Ralph Metcalfe; United States	Arthur Jonath; Germany
1936 Berlin	Jesse Owens; United States	Ralph Metcalfe; United States	Tinus Osendarp; Netherlands
1948 London	Harrison Dillard; United States	Barney Ewell; United States	Lloyd LaBeach; Panama
1952 Helsinki	Lindy Remigino; United States	Herb McKenley; Jamaica	McDonald Bailey; Great Britain
1956 Melbourne	Bobby Morrow; United States	Thane Baker; United States	Hector Hogan; Australia
1960 Rome	Armin Hary; United Team of Germany	Dave Sime; United States	Peter Radford; Great Britain
1964 Tokyo	Bob Hayes; United States	Enrique Figuerola; Cuba	Harry Jerome; Canada
1968 Mexico City	Jim Hines; United States	Lennox Miller; Jamaica	Charles Greene; United States
1972 Munich	Valeriy Borzov; Soviet Union	Robert Taylor; United States	Lennox Miller; Jamaica
1976 Montreal	Hasely Crawford; Trinidad and Tobago	Don Quarrie; Jamaica	Valeriy Borzov; Soviet Union
1980 Moscow	Allan Wells; Great Britain	Silvio Leonard; Cuba	Petar Petrov; Bulgaria
1984 Los Angeles	Carl Lewis; United States	Sam Graddy; United States	Ben Johnson; Canada
1988 Seoul	Carl Lewis; United States	Linford Christie; Great Britain	Calvin Smith; United States
1992 Barcelona	Linford Christie; Great Britain	Frankie Fredericks; Namibia	Dennis Mitchell; United States
1996 Atlanta	Donovan Bailey; Canada	Frankie Fredericks; Namibia	Ato Boldon; Trinidad and Tobago
2000 Sydney	Maurice Greene; United States	Ato Boldon; Trinidad and Tobago	Obadele Thompson; Barbados
2004 Athens	Justin Gatlin; United States	Francis Obikwelu; Portugal	Maurice Greene; United States
2008 Beijing	Usain Bolt; Jamaica	Richard Thompson; Trinidad and Tobago	Walter Dix; United States
2012 London	Usain Bolt; Jamaica	Yohan Blake; Jamaica	Justin Gatlin; United States
2016 Rio de Janeiro	Usain Bolt; Jamaica	Justin Gatlin; United States	Andre De Grasse; Canada
2020 Tokyo	Marcell Jacobs; Italy	Fred Kerley; United States	Andre De Grasse; Canada
2024 Paris	Noah Lyles; United States	Kishane Thompson; Jamaica	Fred Kerley; United States

== World Championships ==
Championships	Gold	Silver	Bronze
1983 Helsinki	Carl Lewis (USA)	Calvin Smith (USA)	Emmit King (USA)
1987 Rome	Carl Lewis (USA)	Raymond Stewart (JAM)	Linford Christie (GBR)
1991 Tokyo	Carl Lewis (USA)	Leroy Burrell (USA)	Dennis Mitchell (USA)
1993 Stuttgart	Linford Christie (GBR)	Andre Cason (USA)	Dennis Mitchell (USA)
1995 Gothenburg	Donovan Bailey (CAN)	Bruny Surin (CAN)	Ato Boldon (TRI)
1997 Athens	Maurice Greene (USA)	Donovan Bailey (CAN)	Tim Montgomery (USA)
1999 Seville	Maurice Greene (USA)	Bruny Surin (CAN)	Dwain Chambers (GBR)
2001 Edmonton	Maurice Greene (USA)	Bernard Williams (USA)	Ato Boldon (TRI)
2003 Saint-Denis	Kim Collins (SKN)	Darrel Brown (TRI)	Darren Campbell (GBR)
2005 Helsinki	Justin Gatlin (USA)	Michael Frater (JAM)	Kim Collins (SKN)
2007 Osaka	Tyson Gay (USA)	Derrick Atkins (BAH)	Asafa Powell (JAM)
2009 Berlin	Usain Bolt (JAM)	Tyson Gay (USA)	Asafa Powell (JAM)
2011 Daegu	Yohan Blake (JAM)	Walter Dix (USA)	Kim Collins (SKN)
2013 Moscow	Usain Bolt (JAM)	Justin Gatlin (USA)	Nesta Carter (JAM)
2015 Beijing	Usain Bolt (JAM)	Justin Gatlin (USA)	Trayvon Bromell (USA) Andre De Grasse (CAN)
2017 London	Justin Gatlin (USA)	Christian Coleman (USA)	Usain Bolt (JAM)
2019 Doha	Christian Coleman (USA)	Justin Gatlin (USA)	Andre De Grasse (CAN)
2022 Eugene	Fred Kerley (USA)	Marvin Bracy (USA)	Trayvon Bromell (USA)
2023 Budapest	Noah Lyles (USA)	Letsile Tebogo (BOT)	Zharnel Hughes (GBR)
2025 Tokyo	Oblique Seville (JAM)	Kishane Thompson (JAM)	Noah Lyles (USA)

==== Medalists by country ====
Rank	Nation	Gold	Silver	Bronze	Total
1	United States (USA)	12	11	7	30
2	Jamaica (JAM)	5	3	4	12
3	Canada (CAN)	1	3	2	6
4	Great Britain (GBR)	1	0	4	5
5	Saint Kitts and Nevis (SKN)	1	0	2	3
6	Trinidad and Tobago (TRI)	0	1	2	3
7	Bahamas (BAH)	0	1	0	1
7	Botswana (BOT)	0	1	0	1

== African Games ==
Games	Gold	Silver	Bronze
1965	Gaoussou Koné (CIV)	John Owiti (KEN)	Folu Erinle (NGR)
1973	Ohene Karikari (GHA)	Barka Sy (SEN)	John Mwebi (KEN)
1978	Amadou Meïté (CIV)	Peter Okodogbe (NGR)	Ohene Karikari (GHA)
1987	Chidi Imoh (NGR)	Eric Akogyiram (GHA)	Charles-Louis Seck (SEN)
1991	Frankie Fredericks (NAM)	Davidson Ezinwa (NGR)	Emmanuel Tuffour (GHA)
1995	Davidson Ezinwa (NGR)	Emmanuel Tuffour (GHA)	Osmond Ezinwa (NGR)
1999	Leonard Myles-Mills (GHA)	Francis Obikwelu (NGR)	Frankie Fredericks (NAM)
2003	Deji Aliu (NGR)	Uchenna Emedolu (NGR)	Leonard Myles-Mills (GHA)
2007	Olusoji Fasuba (NGR)	Eric Nkansah (GHA)	Uchenna Emedolu (NGR)
2011	Amr Seoud (EGY)	Ben Youssef Meïté (CIV)	Obinna Metu (NGR)
2015	Ben Youssef Meïté (CIV)	Ogho-Oghene Egwero (NGR)	Wilfried Koffi Hua (CIV)
2019	Raymond Ekevwo (NGR)	Arthur Cissé (CIV)	Usheoritse Itsekiri (NGR)

== Asian Games ==
Games	Gold	Silver	Bronze
1951 New Delhi	Lavy Pinto; India	Toshihiro Ohashi; Japan	Tomio Hosoda; Japan
1954 Manila	Abdul Khaliq; Pakistan	Genaro Cabrera; Philippines	Marian Gabriel; India
1958 Tokyo	Abdul Khaliq; Pakistan	Kyohei Ushio; Japan	Isaac Gomez; Philippines
1962 Jakarta	Mohammad Sarengat; Indonesia	Mani Jegathesan; Malaya	Rogelio Onofre; Philippines
1966 Bangkok	Mani Jegathesan; Malaysia	C. Kunalan; Singapore	Hideo Iijima; Japan
1970 Bangkok	Masahide Jinno; Japan	Anat Ratanapol; Thailand	C. Kunalan; Singapore
1974 Tehran	Anat Ratanapol; Thailand	Masahide Jinno; Japan	Suchart Jairsuraparp; Thailand
1978 Bangkok	Suchart Jairsuraparp; Thailand	Ramaswamy Gnanasekaran; India	Seo Mal-gu; South Korea
1982 New Delhi	Rabuan Pit; Malaysia	Jang Jae-keun; South Korea	Suchart Jairsuraparp; Thailand
1986 Seoul	Talal Mansour; Qatar	Hiroki Fuwa; Japan	Zheng Chen; China
1990 Beijing	Talal Mansour; Qatar	Zheng Chen; China	Sriyantha Dissanayake; Sri Lanka
1994 Hiroshima	Talal Mansour; Qatar	Vitaliy Savin; Kazakhstan	Chen Wenzhong; China
1998 Bangkok	Koji Ito; Japan	Reanchai Seeharwong; Thailand	Yasukatsu Otsuki; Japan
2002 Busan	Jamal Al-Saffar; Saudi Arabia	Nobuharu Asahara; Japan	Chen Haijian; China
2006 Doha	Yahya Habeeb; Saudi Arabia	Naoki Tsukahara; Japan	Wachara Sondee; Thailand
2010 Guangzhou	Lao Yi; China	Yasir Al-Nashiri; Saudi Arabia	Barakat Al-Harthi; Oman
2014 Icheon	Femi Ogunode; Qatar	Su Bingtian; China	Kei Takase; Japan
2018 Jakarta–Palembang	Su Bingtian; China	Tosin Ogunode; Qatar	Ryota Yamagata; Japan

== Central American and Caribbean Games ==
Games	Gold	Silver	Bronze
1926	Mariano Aguilar (MEX)	Francisco Ramírez (MEX)	Mario González (CUB)
1930	Alberto Torriento (CUB)	Gustavo Alfonso (CUB)	Reginald Beckford (PAN)
1935	Conrado Rodríguez (CUB)	José Costa (CUB)	Reginald Beckford (PAN)
1938	Jennings Blackett (PAN)	Jacinto Ortiz (CUB)	Eulalio Villodas (PUR)
1946	Rafael Fortún (CUB)	Herb McKenley (JAM)	McDonald Bailey (TRI)
1950	Rafael Fortún (CUB)	Herb McKenley (JAM)	Lloyd La Beach (PAN)
1954	Rafael Fortún (CUB)	Leslie Laing (JAM)	Raúl Mazorra (CUB)
1959	Manuel Rivera (PUR)	Horacio Esteves (VEN)	Lloyd Murad (VEN)
1962	Tom Robinson (BAH)	Rafael Romero (VEN)	Arquímedes Herrera (VEN)
1966	Enrique Figuerola (CUB)	Edwin Roberts (TRI)	Carl Plaskett (ISV)
1970	Pablo Montes (CUB)	Hermes Ramírez (CUB)	Michael Fray (JAM)
1974	Silvio Leonard (CUB)	José Triana (CUB)	Pablo Montes (CUB)
1978	Silvio Leonard (CUB)	Osvaldo Lara (CUB)	Guy Abrahams (PAN)
1982	Leandro Peñalver (CUB)	Osvaldo Lara (CUB)	Juan Núñez (DOM)
1986	Andrés Simón (CUB)	Juan Núñez (DOM)	Ray Stewart (JAM)
1990	Joel Isasi (CUB)	Jorge Aguilera (CUB)	Wayne Watson (JAM)
1993	Joel Isasi (CUB)	Andrés Simón (CUB)	Patrick Delice (TRI)
1998	Obadele Thompson (BAR)	Dwight Ferguson (BAH)	Luis Pérez (CUB)
2002	Dion Crabbe (IVB)	Jesús Carrión (PUR)	Rolando Blanco (GUA)
2006	Churandy Martina (AHO)	Derrick Atkins (BAH)	Jacey Harper (TRI)
2010	Churandy Martina (AHO)	Daniel Bailey (ATG)	Lerone Clarke (JAM)
2014	Rolando Palacios (HON)	Levi Cadogan (BAR)	Yaniel Carrero (CUB)
2018	Nesta Carter (JAM)	Jason Rogers (SKN)	Cejhae Greene (ATG)
2023	Emanuel Archibald (GUY)	José González (DOM)	Rikkoi Brathwaite (BVI)

== Commonwealth Games ==
Games	Gold	Silver	Bronze
1970	Don Quarrie (JAM)	Lennox Miller (JAM)	Hasely Crawford (TRI)
1974	Don Quarrie (JAM)	John Mwebi (KEN)	Ohene Karikari (GHA)
1978	Don Quarrie (JAM)	Allan Wells (SCO)	Hasely Crawford (TRI)
1982	Allan Wells (SCO)	Ben Johnson (CAN)	Cameron Sharp (SCO)
1986	Ben Johnson (CAN)	Linford Christie (ENG)	Mike McFarlane (ENG)
1990	Linford Christie (ENG)	Davidson Ezinwa (NGR)	Bruny Surin (CAN)
1994	Linford Christie (ENG)	Michael Green (JAM)	Frankie Fredericks (NAM)
1998	Ato Boldon (TRI)	Frankie Fredericks (NAM)	Obadele Thompson (BAR)
2002	Kim Collins (SKN)	Uchenna Emedolu (NGR)	Pierre Browne (CAN)
2006	Asafa Powell (JAM)	Olusoji Fasuba (NGR)	Marc Burns (TRI)
2010	Lerone Clarke (JAM)	Mark Lewis-Francis (ENG)	Aaron Armstrong (TRI)
2014	Kemar Bailey-Cole (JAM)	Adam Gemili (ENG)	Nickel Ashmeade (JAM)
2018	Akani Simbine (RSA)	Henricho Bruintjies (RSA)	Yohan Blake (JAM)
2022	Ferdinand Omanyala (KEN)	Akani Simbine (RSA)	Yupun Abeykoon (SRI)

== East Asian Games ==
Games	Gold	Silver	Bronze
1993	Jin Sun-kuk (KOR)	Lin Wei (CHN)	Chen Wenzhong (CHN)
1997	Nobuharu Asahara (JPN)	Lin Wei (CHN)	Hideki Onohara (JPN)
2001	Gennadiy Chernovol (KAZ)	Chen Haijian (CHN)	Nobuharu Asahara (JPN)
2005	Hu Kai (CHN)	Shingo Kawabata (JPN)	Wang Shih-wen (TPE)
2009	Su Bingtian (CHN)	Shintaro Kimura (JPN)	Yi Wei-chen (TPE)
2013	Su Bingtian (CHN)	Ryota Yamagata (JPN)	Kazuma Ōseto (JPN)

== Goodwill Games ==
Games	Gold	Silver	Bronze
1986	Ben Johnson (CAN)	Chidi Imoh (NGR)	Carl Lewis (USA)
1990	Leroy Burrell (USA)	Carl Lewis (USA)	Mark Witherspoon (USA)
1994	Dennis Mitchell (USA)	Leroy Burrell (USA)	Jon Drummond (USA)
1998	Maurice Greene (USA)	Ato Boldon (TRI)	Brian Lewis (USA)
2001	Dwain Chambers (GBR)	Tim Montgomery (USA)	Matt Shirvington (AUS)

== Jeux de la Francophonie ==
Games	Gold	Silver	Bronze
1989	Daniel Sangouma (FRA)	Bruno Marie-Rose (FRA)	Max Morinière (FRA)
1994	Bruny Surin (Quebec)	Donovan Bailey (CAN)	Oumar Loum (SEN)
2001	Stéphan Buckland (MRI)	Bruny Surin (Quebec)	Éric Pacôme N'Dri (CIV)
2005	Idrissa Sanou (BUR)	Éric Pacôme N'Dri (CIV)	Amr Ibrahim Mostafa Seoud (EGY)
2009	Ben Youssef Meïté (CIV)	Aziz Ouhadi (MAR)	Mamadou Lamine Niang (SEN)
2013	Emmanuel Biron (FRA)	Dontae Richards-Kwok (CAN)	Samuel Francis (QAT)
2017	Dylan Sicobo (SEY)	Arthur Cissé (CIV)	Bismark Boateng (CAN)

== Lusofonia Games ==
Games	Gold	Silver	Bronze
2006	Jorge Celio Sena (BRA)	Rafael Ribeiro (BRA)	Ricardo Monteiro (POR)
2009	Francis Obikwelu (POR)	José Carlos Moreira (BRA)	Holder da Silva (GNB)
2014	Osvaldo Morais (ANG)	Denielsan Martins (CPV)	Mauro Gaspar (ANG)

== Mediterranean Games ==
Games	Gold	Silver	Bronze
1951	Stefanos Petrakis (GRE)	Mauro Frizzoni (ITA)	Wolfango Montanari (ITA)
1955	Luigi Gnocchi (ITA)	Alain David (FRA)	Sergio D'Asnasch (ITA)
1959	Abdoulaye Seye (FRA)	Paul Genevay (FRA)	Alain David (FRA)
1963	Claude Piquemal (FRA)	Livio Berruti (ITA)	Lazar Benakoun (MAR)
1967	Charis Ayvaliotis (GRE)	Pasquale Giannattasio (ITA)	Ennio Preatoni (ITA)
1971	Vasilis Papageorgopoulos (GRE)	Mohamed Belkhodja (TUN)	Ivica Karasi (YUG)
1975	Pietro Mennea (ITA)	Vasilis Papageorgopoulos (GRE)	René Metz (FRA)
1979	Pietro Mennea (ITA)	Gianfranco Lazzer (ITA)	Philippe Lejoncour (FRA)
1983	Pierfrancesco Pavoni (ITA)	Antoine Richard (FRA)	Stefano Tilli (ITA)
1987	Stefano Tilli (ITA)	Ezio Madonia (ITA)	Mustapha Kamel Selmi (ALG)
1991	Ezio Madonia (ITA)	Yiannis Zisimides (CYP)	Cengiz Kavaklıoğlu (TUR)
1993	Alexandros Terzian (GRE)	Jean-Charles Trouabal (FRA)	Daniel Sangouma (FRA)
1997	Angelos Pavlakakis (GRE)	Anninos Marcoullides (CYP)	Stéphane Cali (FRA)
2001	Aristotelis Gavelas (GRE)	Maurizio Checcucci (ITA)	Anninos Marcoullides (CYP)
2005	Matic Osovnikar (SLO)	Lueyi Dovy (FRA)	Marco Torrieri (ITA)
2009	Martial Mbandjock (FRA)	Emanuele Di Gregorio (ITA)	Fabio Cerutti (ITA)
2013	(France) Emmanuel Biron (FRA)	(Turkey) Ramil Guliyev (TUR)	(Italy) Michael Tumi (ITA)
2018	(Turkey) Jak Ali Harvey (TUR)	(Turkey) Emre Zafer Barnes (TUR)	(Italy) Federico Cattaneo (ITA)
2022	(Turkey) Jak Ali Harvey (TUR)	(Turkey) Ramil Guliyev (TUR)	(Greece) Ioannis Nifadopoulos (GRE)

== Pan American Games ==
Games	Gold	Silver	Bronze
1951	Rafael Fortún (CUB)	Art Bragg (USA)	Herb McKenley (JAM)
1955	Rod Richard (USA)	Mike Agostini (TRI)	Willie Williams (USA)
1959	Ray Norton (USA)	Mike Agostini (BWI)	Enrique Figuerola (CUB)
1963	Enrique Figuerola (CUB)	Arquímedes Herrera (VEN)	Ira Murchison (USA)
1967	Harry Jerome (CAN)	Willie Turner (USA)	Hermes Ramírez (CUB)
1971	Don Quarrie (JAM)	Lennox Miller (JAM)	Del Meriwether (USA)
1975	Silvio Leonard (CUB)	Hasely Crawford (TRI)	Hermes Ramírez (CUB)
1979	Silvio Leonard (CUB)	Harvey Glance (USA)	Emmit King (USA)
1983	Leandro Peñalver (CUB)	Sam Graddy (USA)	Osvaldo Lara (CUB)
1987	Lee McRae (USA)	Ray Stewart (JAM)	Juan Núñez (DOM)
1991	Robson da Silva (BRA)	Andre Cason (USA)	Jeff Williams (USA)
1995	Glenroy Gilbert (CAN)	Joel Isasi (CUB)	André Domingos (BRA)
1999	Bernard Williams (USA)	Freddy Mayola (CUB)	Claudinei da Silva (BRA)
2003	Michael Frater (JAM)	Mardy Scales (USA)	Anson Henry (CAN)
2007	Churandy Martina (AHO)	Darvis Patton (USA)	Brendan Christian (ATG)
2011	Lerone Clarke (JAM)	Kim Collins (SKN)	Emmanuel Callender (TRI)
2015	Andre De Grasse (CAN)	Ramon Gittens (BAR)	Antoine Adams (SKN)
2019	Mike Rodgers (USA)	Paulo André de Oliveira (BRA)	Cejhae Greene (ANT)
2023	José González (DOM)	Felipe Bardi (BRA)	Emanuel Archibald (GUY)

== South American Games ==
Games	Gold	Silver	Bronze
1978	Luis Schneider (CHI)	José Luis Elías (PER)	Gustavo Dubarbier (ARG)
1982	Luis Schneider (CHI)	Hugo Alzamora (ARG)	Mauricio Urquiza (CHI)
1986	Gerardo Meinardi (ARG)	Oscar Barrionuevo (ARG)	Álvaro Prenafeta (CHI)
1990	Roberto Marshall (CHI)	Miguel Bernal (PER)	Carlos Gats (ARG)
1994	Robinson Urrutia (COL)	Claudinei da Silva (BRA)	Marcelo Silva (BRA)
1998	Ricardo Roach (CHI)	Carlos Gats (ARG)	Juan Pablo Faúndez (CHI)
2002	Churandy Martina (AHO)	Bruno Pacheco (BRA)	Eliezer De Almeida (BRA)
2006	Kael Becerra (CHI)	Franklin Nazareno (ECU)	Daniel Grueso (COL)
2010	Isidro Montoya (COL)	Álvaro Gómez (COL)	Diego Rivas (VEN)
2014	Alonso Edward (PAN)	Jefferson Lucindo (BRA)	Álex Quiñónez (ECU)
2018	Alonso Edward (PAN)	Álex Quiñónez (ECU)	Vitor Hugo dos Santos (BRA)
2022	Franco Florio (ARG)	Felipe Bardi (BRA)	Carlos Palacios (COL)

== African Championships ==
Championships	Gold	Silver	Bronze
1979 Dakar	Ernest Obeng (GHA)	Théophile Nkounkou (CGO)	Edward Ofili (NGR)
1982 Cairo	Ernest Obeng (GHA)	Théophile Nkounkou (CGO)	Boubacar Diallo (SEN)
1984 Rabat	Chidi Imoh (NGR)	Charles-Louis Seck (SEN)	Ikpoto Eseme (NGR)
1985 Cairo	Chidi Imoh (NGR)	Charles-Louis Seck (SEN)	Victor Edet (NGR)
1988 Annaba	John Myles-Mills (GHA)	Charles-Louis Seck (SEN)	Iziaq Adeyanju (NGR)
1989 Lagos	Amadou M'Baye (SEN)	Salaam Gariba (GHA)	Patrick Nwankwo (NGR)
1990 Cairo	Joseph Gikonyo (KEN)	Abdullahi Tetengi (NGR)	Charles-Louis Seck (SEN)
1992 Belle-Vue	Victor Omagbemi (NGR)	Charles-Louis Seck (SEN)	Johannes Rossouw (RSA)
1993 Durban	Daniel Effiong (NGR)	Jean-Olivier Zirignon (CIV)	Nelson Boateng (GHA)
1996 Yaoundé	Seun Ogunkoya (NGR)	Benjamin Sirimou (CMR)	Sunday Emmanuel (NGR)
1998 Dakar	Seun Ogunkoya (NGR)	Frankie Fredericks (NAM)	Leonard Myles-Mills (GHA)
2000 Algiers	Aziz Zakari (GHA)	Stéphan Buckland (MRI)	Kenneth Andam (GHA)
2002 Radès	Frankie Fredericks (NAM)	Uchenna Emedolu (NGR)	Idrissa Sanou (BUR)
2004 Brazzaville	Olusoji Fasuba (NGR)	Idrissa Sanou (BUR)	Jaysuma Saidy Ndure (GAM)
2006 Bambous	Olusoji Fasuba (NGR)	Uchenna Emedolu (NGR)	Eric Nkansah (GHA)
2008 Addis Ababa	Olusoji Fasuba (NGR)	Uchenna Emedolu (NGR)	Hannes Dreyer (RSA)
2010 Nairobi	Ben Youssef Meïté (CIV)	Aziz Zakari (GHA)	Simon Magakwe (RSA)
2012 Porto-Novo	Simon Magakwe (RSA)	Amr Ibrahim Mostafa Seoud (EGY)	Wilfried Koffi Hua (CIV)
2014 Marrakech	Wilfried Koffi Hua (CIV)	Mark Jelks (NGR)	Monzavous Edwards (NGR)
2016 Durban	Ben Youssef Meïté (CIV)	Mosito Lehata (LES)	Akani Simbine (RSA)
2018 Asaba	Akani Simbine (RSA)	Arthur Cissé (CIV)	Simon Magakwe (RSA)
2022 Saint Pierre	Ferdinand Omanyala (KEN)	Akani Simbine (RSA)	Henricho Bruintjies (RSA)

== Asian Championships ==
Championships	Gold	Silver	Bronze
1973	Anat Ratanapol (THA)	Suchart Jairsuraparp (THA)	Takao Ishizawa (JPN)
1975	Anat Ratanapol (THA)	Masahide Jinno (JPN)	Ramaswamy Gnanasekaran (IND)
1979	Suchart Jairsuraparp (THA)	Suh Mei-Guh (KOR)	Akira Harada (JPN)
1981	Suchart Jairsuraparp (THA)	Yuan Guoqiang (CHN)	Sumet Promna (THA)
1983	Suchart Jairsuraparp (THA)	Sumet Promna (THA)	Mohammed Purnomo (INA)
1985	Zheng Chen (CHN)	Mohammed Purnomo (INA)	Jang Jae-keun (KOR)
1987	Talal Mansour (QAT)	Cheng Hsin-fu (TPE)	Li Tao (CHN)
1989	Zheng Chen (CHN)	Li Tao (CHN)	Takayuki Nakamichi (JPN)
1991	Talal Mansour (QAT)	Chen Wenzhong (CHN)	Khalid Jouma Ibrahim (BHR)
1993	Talal Mansour (QAT)	Li Tao (CHN)	Lin Wei (CHN)
1995	Lin Wei (CHN)	Anvar Kuchmuradov (UZB)	Yoshitaka Ito (JPN)
1998	Zhou Wei (CHN)	Watson Nyambek (MAS)	Hiroyasu Tsuchie (JPN)
2000	Jamal Al-Saffar (KSA)	Anil Kumar Prakash (IND)	Yin Hanzhao (CHN)
2002	Jamal Al-Saffar (KSA)	Gennadiy Chernovol (KAZ)	Salem Al-Yami (KSA)
2003	Chen Haijian (CHN)	Gennadiy Chernovol (KAZ)	Salem Al-Yami (KSA)
2005	Yahya Al-Ghahes (KSA)	Shingo Suetsugu (JPN)	Khalid Yousef Al-Obaidli (QAT)
2007	Samuel Francis (QAT)	Masahide Ueno (JPN)	Al-Waleed Abdulla (QAT)
2009	Zhang Peimeng (CHN)	Naoki Tsukahara (JPN)	Guo Fan (CHN)
2011	Su Bingtian (CHN)	Masashi Eriguchi (JPN)	Sota Kawatsura (JPN)
2013	Su Bingtian (CHN)	Samuel Francis (QAT)	Barakat Al-Harthi (OMA)
2015	Femi Ogunode (QAT)	Zhang Peimeng (CHN)	Reza Ghasemi (IRN)
2017	Hassan Taftian (IRI)	Femi Ogunode (QAT)	Yang Chun-han (TPE)
2019	Yoshihide Kiryū (JPN)	Lalu Muhammad Zohri (INA)	Wu Zhiqiang (CHN)
2023	Hiroki Yanagita (JPN)	Abdullah Abkar Mohammed (KSA)	Hassan Taftian (IRN)

== Central American and Caribbean Championships in Athletics ==
Championships	Gold	Silver	Bronze
1967	Hermes Ramírez (CUB)	Juan "Papo" Franceschi (PUR)	Félix Eugellés (CUB)
1969	Hermes Ramírez (CUB)	José Triana (CUB)	Carl Edmund (PAN)
1971	Don Quarrie (JAM)	Lennox Miller (JAM)	Pablo Montes (CUB)
1973	Don Quarrie (JAM)	José Triana (CUB)	Carl Lawson (JAM)
1975	Charles Joseph (TRI)	Pablo Franco (PUR)	Félix Mata (VEN)
1977	Hasely Crawford (TRI)	Silvio Leonard (CUB)	Osvaldo Lara (CUB)
1979	Guy Abrahams (PAN)	Gerardo Suero (DOM)	Esteban Briceño (VEN)
1981	Colin Bradford (JAM)	Silvio Leonard (CUB)	Juan Núñez (DOM)
1983	Juan Núñez (DOM)	Tomás González (CUB)	Florencio Aguilar (PAN)
1985	Andrés Simón (CUB)	Osvaldo Lara (CUB)	Fabian Whymns (BAH)
1987	Juan Núñez (DOM)	Luis Morales (PUR)	John Mair (JAM)
1989	Joel Isasi (CUB)	Andrés Simón (CUB)	Andrew Smith (JAM)
1991	John Mair (JAM)	Eduardo Nava (MEX)	Henrico Atkins (BAR)
1993	Obadele Thompson (BAR)	Leonardo Prevost (CUB)	Kirk Cummins (BAR)
1995	Obadele Thompson (BAR)	Joel Isasi (CUB)	Jaime Barragán (MEX)
1997	Luis Pérez (CUB)	Jason Shelton (JAM)	Carlos Villaseñor (MEX)
1999	Obadele Thompson (BAR)	Kim Collins (SKN)	Patrick Jarrett (JAM)
2001	Kim Collins (SKN)	Julien Dunkley (JAM)	Jacey Harper (TRI)
2003	Kim Collins (SKN)	Darrel Brown (TRI)	Marc Burns (TRI)
2005	Darrel Brown (TRI)	Marc Burns (TRI)	Churandy Martina (AHO)
2008	Darrel Brown (TRI)	Daniel Bailey (ATG)	Henry Vizcaíno (CUB)
2009	Emmanuel Callender (TRI)	Lerone Clarke (JAM)	Andrew Hinds (BAR)
2011	Keston Bledman (TRI)	Daniel Bailey (ATG)	Dexter Lee (JAM)
2013	Andrew Fisher (JAM)	Andrew Hinds (BAR)	Ramon Gittens (BAR)

== European Championships ==
Championships	Gold	Silver	Bronze
1934 Turin	Chris Berger (NED)	Erich Borchmeyer (GER)	József Sir (HUN)
1938 Paris	Tinus Osendarp (NED)	Orazio Mariani (ITA)	Lennart Strandberg (SWE)
1946 Oslo	Jack Archer (GBR)	Haakon Tranberg (NOR)	Carlo Monti (ITA)
1950 Brussels	Étienne Bally (FRA)	Franco Leccese (ITA)	Vladimir Sukharev (URS)
1954 Berne	Heinz Fütterer (FRG)	René Bonino (FRA)	George Ellis (GBR)
1958 Stockholm	Armin Hary (FRG)	Manfred Germar (FRG)	Peter Radford (GBR)
1962 Belgrade	Claude Piquemal (FRA)	Jocelyn Delecour (FRA)	Peter Gamper (FRG)
1966 Budapest	Wiesław Maniak (POL)	Roger Bambuck (FRA)	Claude Piquemal (FRA)
1969 Athens	Valeriy Borzov (URS)	Alain Sarteur (FRA)	Philippe Clerc (SUI)
1971 Helsinki	Valeriy Borzov (URS)	Gerhard Wucherer (FRG)	Vasilis Papageorgopoulos (GRE)
1974 Rome	Valeriy Borzov (URS)	Pietro Mennea (ITA)	Klaus-Dieter Bieler (FRG)
1978 Prague	Pietro Mennea (ITA)	Eugen Ray (GDR)	Vladimir Ignatenko (URS)
1982 Athens	Frank Emmelmann (GDR)	Pierfrancesco Pavoni (ITA)	Marian Woronin (POL)
1986 Stuttgart	Linford Christie (GBR)	Steffen Bringmann (GDR)	Bruno Marie-Rose (FRA)
1990 Split	Linford Christie (GBR)	Daniel Sangouma (FRA)	John Regis (GBR)
1994 Helsinki	Linford Christie (GBR)	Geir Moen (NOR)	Aleksandr Porkhomovskiy (RUS)
1998 Budapest	Darren Campbell (GBR)	Dwain Chambers (GBR)	Haralabos Papadias (GRE)
2002 Munich	Francis Obikwelu (POR)	Darren Campbell (GBR)	Roland Németh (HUN)
2006 Gothenburg	Francis Obikwelu (POR)	Andrey Yepishin (RUS)	Matic Osovnikar (SLO)
2010 Barcelona	Christophe Lemaitre (FRA)	Mark Lewis-Francis (GBR)	Martial Mbandjock (FRA)
2012 Helsinki	Christophe Lemaitre (FRA)	Jimmy Vicaut (FRA)	Jaysuma Saidy Ndure (NOR)
2014 Zürich	James Dasaolu (GBR)	Christophe Lemaitre (FRA)	Harry Aikines-Aryeetey (GBR)
2016 Amsterdam	Churandy Martina (NED)	Jak Ali Harvey (TUR)	Jimmy Vicaut (FRA)
2018 Berlin	Zharnel Hughes (GBR)	Reece Prescod (GBR)	Jak Ali Harvey (TUR)
2022 Munich	Marcell Jacobs (ITA)	Zharnel Hughes (GBR)	Jeremiah Azu (GBR)

== Ibero-American Championships in Athletics ==
Championships	Gold	Silver	Bronze
1983	José Isalgué (CUB)	Nelson dos Santos (BRA)	Ángel Heras (ESP)
1986	Robson da Silva (BRA)	Andrés Simón (CUB)	Ricardo Chacón (CUB)
1988	Robson da Silva (BRA)	Leandro Peñalver (CUB)	Arnaldo da Silva (BRA)
1990	Robson da Silva (BRA)	Fernando Botasso (BRA)	Enrique Talavera (ESP)
1992	Joel Isasi (CUB)	Andrés Simón (CUB)	Arnaldo da Silva (BRA)
1994	Carlos Gats (ARG)	Jaime Barragán (MEX)	Jorge Aguilera (CUB)
1996	Sebastián Keitel (CHI)	Arnaldo da Silva (BRA)	Marcelo Brivilatti (BRA)
1998	Sebastián Keitel (CHI)	Édson Ribeiro (BRA)	Carlos Gats (ARG)
2000	Vicente de Lima (BRA)	Luis Alberto Pérez-Rionda (CUB)	Sebastián Keitel (CHI)
2002	Heber Viera (URU)	Vicente de Lima (BRA)	Édson Ribeiro (BRA)
2004	Vicente de Lima (BRA)	André Domingos (BRA)	Juan Sainfleur (DOM)
2006	Vicente de Lima (BRA)	Kael Becerra (CHI)	Heber Viera (URU)
2008	José Carlos Moreira (BRA)	Franklin Nazareno (ECU)	Kael Becerra (CHI)
2010	Nilson André (BRA)	Yunier Pérez (CUB)	Daniel Grueso (COL)
2012	Álex Quiñónez (ECU)	Sandro Viana (BRA)	Carlos Rodriguez (PUR)
2014	Andy Martínez (PER)	Jorge Vides (BRA)	Isidro Montoya (COL)
2016	Stanly del Carmen (DOM)	Bruno de Barros (BRA)	Diego Palomeque (COL)
2018	Paulo André de Oliveira (BRA)	Jorge Vides (BRA)	Reynier Mena (CUB)
2022	Shainer Rengifo Montoya (CUB)	Felipe Bardi dos Santos (BRA)	Franco Florio (ARG)

== NACAC Championships ==
Championships	Gold	Silver	Bronze
2007	Richard Thompson (TRI)	Monzavous Edwards (USA)	Abidemi Omole (USA)
2015	Remontay McClain (USA)	Ramon Gittens (BAR)	Levi Cadogan (BAR)
2018	Tyquendo Tracey (JAM)	Kendal Williams (USA)	Cameron Burrell (USA)
2022	Ackeem Blake (JAM)	Kyree King (USA)	Brandon Carnes (USA)

== South American Championships ==
Championships	Gold	Silver	Bronze
1919	Henry Bowles (URU)	Marcelo Uranga (CHI)	Ricardo Müller (CHI)
1920	Marcelo Uranga (CHI)	Julio Gorlero (URU)	Humberto Ramírez (CHI)
1924	Miguel Enrico (ARG)	Augusto de Negri (ARG)	Luis Miguel (CHI)
1926	Eduardo Albe (ARG)	Alberto Barucco (ARG)	Juan Carlos Ure Aldao (ARG)
1927	Juan Piña (ARG)	Rodolfo Wagner (CHI)	Alex Hanning (CHI)
1929	Hernán Spinassi (ARG)	Carlos Bianchi Lutti (ARG)	Juan Carlos Ure Aldao (ARG)
1931	Carlos Bianchi Lutti (ARG)	José de Almeida (BRA)	Juan Piña (ARG)
1933	José de Almeida (BRA)	Juan Maglio (ARG)	José Vicente Salinas (CHI)
1935	José de Almeida (BRA)	José Vicente Salinas (CHI)	Aloisio Queiroz Telles (BRA)
1937	José de Assis (BRA)	José Ferraz (BRA)	Roberto Cavanna (ARG)
1939	José de Assis (BRA)	Roberto Valenzuela (CHI)	Eulogio Higueras (PER)
1941	José de Assis (BRA)	José Ferraz (BRA)	Roberto Valenzuela (CHI)
1943	Adelio Márquez (ARG)	Walter Pérez (URU)	Roberto Valenzuela (CHI)
1945	José de Assis (BRA)	Walter Pérez (URU)	Adelio Márquez (ARG)
1947	Gerardo Bönnhoff (ARG)	Santiago Ferrando (PER)	Carlos Isaack (ARG)
1949	Gerardo Salazar (PER)	Aroldo da Silva (BRA)	Mario Fayos (URU)
1952	Gerardo Salazar (PER)	Gerardo Bönnhoff (ARG)	José da Conceição (BRA)
1954	Paulo de Fonseca (BRA)	José da Conceição (BRA)	Benedito Ferreira (BRA)
1956	Paulo de Fonseca (BRA)	Gerardo Bönnhoff (ARG)	João Pires Sobrinho (BRA)
1958	José da Conceição (BRA)	Luis Vienna (ARG)	João Pires Sobrinho (BRA)
1961	Arquímedes Herrera (VEN)	Horacio Esteves (VEN)	José da Conceição (BRA)
1963	Arquímedes Herrera (VEN)	Joe Satow (BRA)	Alfonso da Silva (BRA)
1965	Iván Moreno (CHI)	Héctor Thomas (VEN)	Manuel Planchart (VEN)
1967	Iván Moreno (CHI)	Jaime Uribe (COL)	Fernando Acevedo (PER)
1969	Iván Moreno (CHI)	Fernando Acevedo (PER)	Andrés Calonge (ARG)
1971	Félix Mata (VEN)	Pedro Bassart (ARG)	Luiz da Silva (BRA)
1974	Rui da Silva (BRA)	Jesús Rico (VEN)	José Chacín (VEN)
1975	Rui da Silva (BRA)	Nelson dos Santos (BRA)	Gustavo Dubarbier (ARG)
1977	Rui da Silva (BRA)	Katsuhiko Nakaya (BRA)	Miguel Sulbarán (VEN)
1979	Altevir de Araújo (BRA)	Manuel Ramírez (COL)	Reinaldo Lizardi (VEN)
1981	Katsuhiko Nakaya (BRA)	Altevir de Araújo (BRA)	Luis Schneider (CHI)
1983	Nelson dos Santos (BRA)	Paulo Roberto Correia (BRA)	Giorgio Mautino (PER)
1985	Arnaldo da Silva (BRA)	Robson da Silva (BRA)	Enrique Canavire (VEN)
1987	Robson da Silva (BRA)	Carlos Bernardo Moreno (CHI)	Carlos de Oliveira (BRA)
1989	John Mena (COL)	Florencio Aguilar (PAN)	Antônio dos Santos Filho (BRA)
1991	Robson da Silva (BRA)	Arnaldo da Silva (BRA)	Carlos Bernardo Moreno (CHI)
1993	Robson da Silva (BRA)	Arnaldo da Silva (BRA)	Óscar Fernández (PER)
1995	Robson da Silva (BRA)	Édson Ribeiro (BRA)	Carlos Gats (ARG)
1997	Sebastián Keitel (CHI)	André Domingos (BRA)	Carlos Gats (ARG)
1999	André Domingos (BRA)	Sebastián Keitel (CHI)	Heber Viera (URU)
2001	Raphael de Oliveira (BRA)	Cláudio Roberto Souza (BRA)	Heber Viera (URU)
2003	Édson Ribeiro (BRA)	Heber Viera (URU)	Jarbas Mascarenhas (BRA)
2005	André Domingos (BRA)	Vicente de Lima (BRA)	Heber Viera (URU)
2006	Daniel Grueso (COL)	Kael Becerra (CHI)	José Carlos Moreira (BRA)
2007	Vicente de Lima (BRA)	Franklin Nazareno (ECU)	Álvaro Gómez (COL)
2009	Alonso Edward (PAN)	Daniel Grueso (COL)	José Carlos Moreira (BRA)
2011	Nilson André (BRA)	Kael Becerra (CHI)	Sandro Viana (BRA)
2013	Álex Quiñónez (ECU)	Bruno de Barros (BRA)	Isidro Montoya (COL)
2015	Diego Palomeque (COL)	Álex Quiñónez (ECU)	Ifrish Alberg (SUR)
2017	Diego Palomeque (COL)	Bruno de Barros (BRA)	Felipe Bardi (BRA)
2019	Rodrigo do Nascimento (BRA)	Felipe Bardi (BRA)	Diego Palomeque (COL)
2021	Felipe Bardi (BRA)	Emanuel Archibald (GUY)	Derick Silva (BRA)
2023	Erik Cardoso (BRA)	Ronal Longa (COL)	Paulo André de Oliveira (BRA)
2025	Felipe Bardi (BRA)	Ronal Longa (COL)	Carlos Flórez (COL)
