= 1979 South American Championships in Athletics – Results =

These are the results of the 1979 South American Championships in Athletics which took place at the Estadio Alfonso López Pumarejo in Bucaramanga, Colombia, between 31 October and 4 November.

== Men's results ==
=== 100 metres ===
Heats – 31 October

Rank	Heat	Name	Nationality	Time	Notes
1	1	Altevir de Araújo	Brazil	10.4	Q
2	1	Manuel Ramírez	Colombia	10.6	Q
3	1	Luis Alberto Schneider	Chile	10.8	Q
4	1	Eduardo de Brito	Argentina	10.9	Q
5	1	Carlos Rodríguez	Panama	10.9	
6	1	Ely Zabala	Venezuela	11.0	
7	1	José Valverde	Peru	11.2	
1	2	Reinaldo Lizardi	Venezuela	10.4	Q
2	2	Milton de Castro	Brazil	10.7	Q
3	2	José Luis Elías	Peru	10.8	Q
4	2	Gustavo Dubarbier	Argentina	10.9	Q
5	2	Fabio García	Colombia	11.0	
6	2	Héctor Fernández	Chile	11.1	
7	2	Alfonso Pitters	Panama	11.3	

Final – 1 November

Rank	Name	Nationality	Time	Notes
1st place, gold medalist(s)	Altevir de Araújo	Brazil	10.1	CR
2nd place, silver medalist(s)	Manuel Ramírez	Colombia	10.4	
3rd place, bronze medalist(s)	Reinaldo Lizardi	Venezuela	10.6	
4	José Luis Elías	Peru	10.6	
5	Eduardo de Brito	Argentina	10.7	
6	Gustavo Dubarbier	Argentina	10.7	
7	Luis Alberto Schneider	Chile	10.8	
8	Milton de Castro	Brazil	10.8	

=== 200 metres ===
Heats – 3 November

Rank	Heat	Name	Nationality	Time	Notes
1	1	Altevir de Araújo	Brazil	21.0	Q
2	1	Héctor Daley	Panama	21.1	Q
3	1	Fabio García	Colombia	21.7	Q
4	1	José Luis Elías	Peru	21.9	Q
5	1	Ely Zabala	Venezuela	22.0	
6	1	Enrique Tapia	Chile	22.1	
7	1	Ricardo Donda	Argentina	22.3	
1	2	Manuel Ramírez	Colombia	21.1	Q
2	2	Katsuhiko Nakaya	Brazil	21.2	Q
3	2	Luis Alberto Schneider	Chile	21.5	Q
4	2	Reinaldo Lizardi	Venezuela	21.6	Q
5	2	Eduardo de Brito	Argentina	21.7	
6	2	Carlos Rodríguez	Panama	22.1	
7	2	José Pérez	Peru	22.6	

Final – 4 November

Rank	Name	Nationality	Time	Notes
1st place, gold medalist(s)	Altevir de Araújo	Brazil	20.5	CR
2nd place, silver medalist(s)	Katsuhiko Nakaya	Brazil	20.8	
3rd place, bronze medalist(s)	Héctor Daley	Panama	21.1	
4	Luis Alberto Schneider	Chile	21.1	
5	Manuel Ramírez	Colombia	21.2	
6	Fabio García	Colombia	21.2	
7	Reinaldo Lizardi	Venezuela	21.5	
	José Luis Elías	Peru	?	

=== 400 metres ===
Heats – 31 October

Rank	Heat	Name	Nationality	Time	Notes
1	1	Ramón Reyes	Venezuela	47.7	Q
2	1	Antônio Ferreira	Brazil	48.0	Q
3	1	Héctor Daley	Panama	48.1	Q
4	1	Felipe Mascaró	Chile	48.1	q
5	1	Jesús Olier	Colombia	48.6	q
6	1	Moisés del Castillo	Peru	51.8	
1	2	Geraldo Pegado	Brazil	48.1	Q
2	2	Patricio Valenzuela	Chile	48.5	Q
3	2	Gabriel Lopera	Colombia	48.7	Q
4	2	Alexis Herrera	Venezuela	48.7	
5	2	Gabriel Castellá	Argentina	49.2	
6	2	Luis Otoya	Peru	50.7	

Final – 1 November

Rank	Name	Nationality	Time	Notes
1st place, gold medalist(s)	Geraldo Pegado	Brazil	46.2	CR
2nd place, silver medalist(s)	Antônio Ferreira	Brazil	46.9	
3rd place, bronze medalist(s)	Héctor Daley	Panama	47.4	
4	Ramón Reyes	Venezuela	47.5	
5	Felipe Mascaró	Chile	47.7	
6	Gabriel Lopera	Colombia	47.9	
7	Jesús Olier	Colombia	48.4	
8	Patricio Valenzuela	Chile	48.4	

=== 800 metres ===
Heats – 3 November

Rank	Heat	Name	Nationality	Time	Notes
1	1	Cristián Molina	Chile	1:49.9	Q
2	1	José Velázquez	Venezuela	1:50.3	Q
3	1	Omar Amdematten	Argentina	1:50.4	Q
4	1	Cosme do Nascimento	Brazil	1:50.4	Q
5	1	Abel Godoy	Uruguay	1:51.5	
6	1	Óscar Carrillo	Colombia	1:52.0	
7	1	Roger Soler	Peru	1:52.5	
1	2	William Wuycke	Venezuela	1:49.3	Q
2	2	Pedro Cáceres	Argentina	1:49.4	Q
3	2	Felipe Mascaró	Chile	1:49.7	Q
4	2	Cristóbal Méndez	Panama	1:50.4	Q
5	2	Wilson dos Santos	Brazil	1:50.4	
6	2	Gabriel Lopera	Colombia	1:51.2	

Final – 4 November

Rank	Name	Nationality	Time	Notes
1st place, gold medalist(s)	Cristián Molina	Chile	1:47.8	CR
2nd place, silver medalist(s)	William Wuycke	Venezuela	1:47.9	
3rd place, bronze medalist(s)	Pedro Cáceres	Argentina	1:48.5	NR
4	Felipe Mascaró	Chile	1:48.8	
5	Cosme do Nascimento	Brazil	1:49.1	
6	Omar Amdematten	Argentina	1:49.8	
7	José Velázquez	Venezuela	1:50.5	
8	Cristóbal Méndez	Panama	1:51.1	

=== 1500 metres ===
2 November

Rank	Name	Nationality	Time	Notes
1st place, gold medalist(s)	Emilio Ulloa	Chile	3:47.0	CR
2nd place, silver medalist(s)	José Velázquez	Venezuela	3:47.6	
3rd place, bronze medalist(s)	Wilson de Santana	Brazil	3:47.9	
4	José Bautista	Colombia	3:48.5	
5	Omar Ortega	Argentina	3:49.8	
6	Jhonny Pérez	Bolivia	3:50.6	PB
7	Jairo Cubillos	Colombia	3:50.9	
8	Cosme do Nascimento	Brazil	3:52.1	
9	Abel Godoy	Uruguay	3:52.9	
10	Omar Amdematten	Argentina	?	
11	Roger Soler	Peru	3:53.0	
12	Víctor Ríos	Chile	3:53.8	
13	Gonzalo Huggins	Venezuela	3:54.1	

=== 5000 metres ===
2 November

Rank	Name	Nationality	Time	Notes
1st place, gold medalist(s)	Alejandro Silva	Chile	13:57.2	CR
2nd place, silver medalist(s)	Domingo Tibaduiza	Colombia	14:03.4	
3rd place, bronze medalist(s)	Jhonny Pérez	Bolivia	14:16.1	
4	Víctor Maldonado	Venezuela	14:19.8	
5	Cláudio Ribeiro	Brazil	14:24.3	
6	José João da Silva	Brazil	14:37.0	
7	Jairo Cubillos	Colombia	14:53.8	
8	Bruno Carrasquel	Venezuela	14:55.2	

=== 10,000 metres ===
2 November

Rank	Name	Nationality	Time	Notes
1st place, gold medalist(s)	Silvio Salazar	Colombia	28:50.4	
2nd place, silver medalist(s)	Domingo Tibaduiza	Colombia	28:51.2	
3rd place, bronze medalist(s)	Víctor Maldonado	Venezuela	29:37.3	
4	Alejandro Silva	Chile	29:55.9	
5	Lucirio Garrido	Venezuela	29:58.5	
6	José João da Silva	Brazil	30:10.2	
7	Edson Bergara	Brazil	30:30.6	
8	Fernando Marrón	Argentina	31:50.8	

=== Marathon ===
4 November – Distance too short

Rank	Name	Nationality	Time	Notes
1st place, gold medalist(s)	Luis Barbosa	Colombia	1:56:12	
2nd place, silver medalist(s)	Alfonso Torres	Colombia	1:57:25	
3rd place, bronze medalist(s)	Lucirio Garrido	Venezuela	1:59:30	
4	Elói Schleder	Brazil	2:00:23	
5	Raúl Llusá	Argentina	2:04:38	
6	Osvaldo Cornejo	Chile	2:06:07	
7	Hélio Aguiar	Brazil	2:06:56	
8	José Ramírez	Chile	2:12:29	

=== 110 metres hurdles ===
Heats – 31 October

Rank	Heat	Name	Nationality	Time	Notes
1	1	Andrés Lyon	Chile	14.4	Q
2	1	Wellington da Nóbrega	Brazil	14.6	Q
3	1	Aníbal Vallenilla	Venezuela	15.3	Q
4	1	Guillermo Gago	Argentina	15.3	Q
5	1	Salvador Ruiz	Panama	15.7	
1	2	Alfredo Piza	Chile	14.5	Q
2	2	Roberto González	Peru	14.9	Q
3	2	Carlos dos Santos	Brazil	15.0	Q
4	2	Óscar Marín	Venezuela	15.1	Q
5	2	Rodolfo Iturraspe	Argentina	15.1	
6	2	Amos Millwood	Panama	15.1	

Final – 1 November

Rank	Name	Nationality	Time	Notes
1st place, gold medalist(s)	Wellington da Nóbrega	Brazil	14.4	
2nd place, silver medalist(s)	Carlos dos Santos	Brazil	14.6	
3rd place, bronze medalist(s)	Andrés Lyon	Chile	14.9	
4	Roberto González	Peru	14.9	
5	Aníbal Vallenilla	Venezuela	15.0	
6	Óscar Marín	Venezuela	15.2	
	Alfredo Piza	Chile	?	
	Guillermo Gago	Argentina	?	

=== 400 metres hurdles ===
Heats – 2 November

Rank	Heat	Name	Nationality	Time	Notes
1	1	Antônio Ferreira	Brazil	52.2	Q
2	1	Darío Cano	Colombia	53.1	Q
3	1	Salvador Ruiz	Panama	53.7	Q
4	1	Freddy Aberdeen	Venezuela	53.8	Q
5	1	Rodolfo Iturraspe	Argentina	53.9	
6	1	Alfredo Piza	Chile	54.3	
7	1	Luis Otoya	Peru	55.7	
1	2	Jesús Betancourt	Colombia	52.4	Q
2	2	Donizete Soares	Brazil	52.7	Q
3	2	José Gregorio Davis	Venezuela	52.7	Q
4	2	Gustavo Arellano	Chile	53.6	Q
5	2	Guillermo Gago	Argentina	53.8	
6	2	Amos Millwood	Panama	57.6	

Final – 4 November

Rank	Name	Nationality	Time	Notes
1st place, gold medalist(s)	Antônio Ferreira	Brazil	50.7	CR
2nd place, silver medalist(s)	Donizete Soares	Brazil	51.1	
3rd place, bronze medalist(s)	José Gregorio Davis	Venezuela	51.1	
4	Jesús Betancourt	Colombia	51.8	
5	Darío Cano	Colombia	52.9	
6	Freddy Aberdeen	Venezuela	54.2	
7	Salvador Ruiz	Panama	55.9	
8	Gustavo Arellano	Chile	57.5	

=== 3000 metres steeplechase ===
31 October

Rank	Name	Nationality	Time	Notes
1st place, gold medalist(s)	Germán Aranda	Colombia	8:52.3	
2nd place, silver medalist(s)	Elói Schleder	Brazil	8:57.4	
3rd place, bronze medalist(s)	Jhonny Pérez	Bolivia	8:58.6	NR
4	Henry Carvajal	Colombia	8:58.7	
5	Gentil de Mello	Brazil	9:05.2	
6	Emilio Ulloa	Chile	9:12.0	
7	Luis Palma	Chile	9:13.6	
8	Rafael Colmenares	Venezuela	9:14.6	

=== 4 × 100 metres relay ===
2 November

Rank	Nation	Competitors	Time	Notes
1st place, gold medalist(s)	Venezuela	Reinaldo Lizardi, Ely Zabala, Esteban Briceño, Miguel Condé	40.0	CR
2nd place, silver medalist(s)	Brazil	Milton de Castro, Geraldo Pegado, Katsuhiko Nakaya, Altevir de Araújo	40.2	
3rd place, bronze medalist(s)	Argentina	Angel Gagliano, Gustavo Dubarbier, Carlos Gambetta, Ricardo Donda	40.4	
4	Chile	Enrique Tapia, Luis Alberto Schneider, Patricio Valenzuela, Héctor Fernández	41.3	
5	Peru	José Valverde, José Luis Elías, Luis Otoya, Roberto González	41.4	

=== 4 × 400 metres relay ===
4 November

Rank	Nation	Competitors	Time	Notes
1st place, gold medalist(s)	Venezuela	Hipolito Brown, Alexis Herrera, Oswaldo Zea, William Wuycke	3:09.8	
2nd place, silver medalist(s)	Argentina	Gabriel Castellá, Carlos Gambetta, Pedro Cáceres, Angel Gagliano	3:10.5	NR
3rd place, bronze medalist(s)	Brazil	Donizete Soares, Wilson dos Santos, Antônio Ferreira, Geraldo Pegado	3:10.5	
4	Colombia	Jesús Olier, Jesús Betancourt, F. Valois, Gabriel Lopera	3:12.7	
5	Chile	Patricio Valenzuela, Felipe Mascaró, Cristián Molina, Emilio Ulloa	3:15.6	
6	Peru	Moisés del Castillo, Luis Otoya, José Pérez, José Luis Elías	3:22.8	

=== 20 kilometres walk ===
1 November – Distance too short

Rank	Name	Nationality	Time	Notes
1st place, gold medalist(s)	Ernesto Alfaro	Colombia	1:29:31	
2nd place, silver medalist(s)	Waldemar da Silva	Brazil	1:29:37	
3rd place, bronze medalist(s)	Jorge Quiñonez	Colombia	1:29:51	
4	Marcial López	Venezuela	1:32:56	
5	Reinaldo Luces	Venezuela	1:39:58	
6	Juan Yañez	Chile	1:42:12	

=== High jump ===
3 November

Rank	Name	Nationality	Result	Notes
1st place, gold medalist(s)	Daniel Mamet	Argentina	2.12	CR
2nd place, silver medalist(s)	Geraldo Rodrigues	Brazil	2.09	
3rd place, bronze medalist(s)	Irajá Cecy	Brazil	2.09	
4	Carlos Gambetta	Argentina	2.09	
5	Rodrigo de la Fuente	Chile	2.06	
6	Víctor Migliaro	Chile	2.03	
7	Carlos Izquierdo	Colombia	2.00	
8	Ricardo Padmore	Panama	1.90	

=== Pole vault ===
1 November

Rank	Name	Nationality	Result	Notes
1st place, gold medalist(s)	Fernando Ruocco	Uruguay	4.70	CR
2nd place, silver medalist(s)	Tito Steiner	Argentina	4.60	
3rd place, bronze medalist(s)	Henry Gómez	Colombia	4.45	
4	Juan Carlos Meza	Chile	4.30	
5	Roberto Steinmez	Argentina	4.30	
6	Carlos de Souza	Brazil	4.20	
7	Enrique Goytisolo	Peru	4.20	
8	Sebastián Errázuriz	Chile	4.20	

=== Long jump ===
1 November

Rank	Name	Nationality	Result	Notes
1st place, gold medalist(s)	Oswaldo Torres	Venezuela	7.67	
2nd place, silver medalist(s)	Carlos Gambetta	Argentina	7.58	
3rd place, bronze medalist(s)	Francisco de Oliveira	Brazil	7.57	
4	Eduardo Labalta	Argentina	7.31	
5	José Salazar	Venezuela	7.13	
6	Ronald Raborg	Peru	7.12	
7	Jaime Cifuentes	Colombia	6.84	

=== Triple jump ===
4 November

Rank	Name	Nationality	Result	Notes
1st place, gold medalist(s)	José Salazar	Venezuela	16.23	
2nd place, silver medalist(s)	Francisco de Oliveira	Brazil	16.15	
3rd place, bronze medalist(s)	Celso Pereira	Brazil	15.83	
4	Angel Gagliano	Argentina	15.75	
5	Jaime Cifuentes	Colombia	15.29	
6	Jorge Mazzeo	Argentina	15.19	

=== Shot put ===
4 November

Rank	Name	Nationality	Result	Notes
1st place, gold medalist(s)	Gert Weil	Chile	16.42	
2nd place, silver medalist(s)	Jesús Ramos	Venezuela	16.22	
3rd place, bronze medalist(s)	José Carlos Jacques	Brazil	16.20	
4	William Romero	Venezuela	15.60	
5	José Luiz Carabolante	Brazil	15.28	
6	Modesto Barreto	Colombia	14.86	
7	José Pérez	Chile	14.74	
8	José Orozco	Colombia	14.02	

=== Discus throw ===
31 October – Light implement (1.75 kg)

Rank	Name	Nationality	Result	Notes
1st place, gold medalist(s)	Sérgio Thomé	Brazil	56.10	
2nd place, silver medalist(s)	Luis Palacios	Venezuela	54.42	
3rd place, bronze medalist(s)	José Carlos Jacques	Brazil	53.10	
4	Modesto Barreto	Colombia	52.86	
5	Wilfredo Jaimes	Venezuela	51.30	
6	Juan Ortega	Colombia	50.36	
7	Alejandro Serrano	Chile	48.70	
8	Eduardo Vieira	Chile	45.88	

=== Hammer throw ===
4 November

Rank	Name	Nationality	Result	Notes
1st place, gold medalist(s)	José Alberto Vallejo	Argentina	63.44	
2nd place, silver medalist(s)	Celso de Moraes	Brazil	61.44	
3rd place, bronze medalist(s)	Daniel Gómez	Argentina	57.60	
4	Ivam Bertelli	Brazil	56.60	
5	Pedro Díaz	Colombia	47.70	
6	Manuel Consiglieri	Peru	41.46	
8	William Romero	Venezuela	38.96	

=== Javelin throw ===
2 November – Old model

Rank	Name	Nationality	Result	Notes
1st place, gold medalist(s)	Angel Garmendia	Argentina	72.32	CR
2nd place, silver medalist(s)	Orángel Rodríguez	Venezuela	70.32	
3rd place, bronze medalist(s)	Paulo Hasse	Brazil	68.84	
4	Héctor Carabalí	Colombia	68.64	
5	Eustacio de León	Panama	68.00	
6	Mario González	Venezuela	66.30	
7	Amílcar de Barros	Brazil	62.00	
8	Pablo Cangiani	Argentina	??.??	

=== Decathlon ===
1–2 November – 1962 tables (1985 conversions given with *)

The highest mark recorded in each event is highlighted in yellow

Rank	Athlete	Nationality	100m	LJ	SP	HJ	400m	110m H	DT	PV	JT	1500m	Points	Conv.	Notes
1st place, gold medalist(s)	Alfredo Silva	Chile	11.3	6.63	12.38	1.94	51.6	15.3	36.66	3.60	55.68	4:42.4	6991	6814*	
2nd place, silver medalist(s)	Ángel Montezuma	Venezuela	11.3	6.53	12.28	1.80	50.4	15.3	43.88	3.40	53.80	4:40.8	6964	6794*	
3rd place, bronze medalist(s)	Claudio Escauriza	Paraguay	11.2	6.64	12.92	1.83	52.0	16.4	41.56	3.50	56.26	5:03.9	6788	6791*	
4	Luiz Felix dos Santos	Brazil	11.1	6.19	11.04	1.80	49.9	15.7	35.18	3.10	53.06	4:34.0	6609	6443*	
5	Fernando Brito	Brazil	11.2	6.64	11.26	1.83	52.1	16.2	34.26	4.00	45.64	4:56.4	6583	6378*	
6	Juan Ríos	Venezuela	11.1	5.90	11.98	1.70	52.8	17.0	36.34	3.90	54.14	5:01.8	6371	6163*	
7	Óscar Vélez	Colombia	11.4	6.39	6.86	1.86	52.4	15.1	17.98	3.70	43.66	4:40.1	5845		

== Women's results ==
=== 100 metres ===
Heats – 31 October

Rank	Heat	Name	Nationality	Time	Notes
1	1	Esmeralda de Jesus Garcia	Brazil	11.7	Q
2	1	Belkis Fava	Argentina	12.2	Q
3	1	Martha Meléndez	Colombia	12.3	Q
4	1	Carla Herencia	Chile	12.4	Q
5	1	Brigitte Winter	Peru	12.5	
6	1	Yaneris Guerra	Venezuela	12.6	
1	2	Carmela Bolívar	Peru	11.7	Q
2	2	Beatriz Allocco	Argentina	11.9	Q
3	2	Sheila de Oliveira	Brazil	12.2	Q
4	2	Glenis Báez	Venezuela	12.3	Q
5	2	Patricia Morales	Colombia	12.6	
6	2	Zaida Núñez	Panama	12.6	
7	2	Flavia Villar	Chile	12.7	

Final – 1 November

Rank	Name	Nationality	Time	Notes
1st place, gold medalist(s)	Beatriz Allocco	Argentina	11.7	=CR
2nd place, silver medalist(s)	Carmela Bolívar	Peru	11.8	
3rd place, bronze medalist(s)	Esmeralda de Jesus Garcia	Brazil	11.8	
4	Sheila de Oliveira	Brazil	11.8	
5	Glenis Báez	Venezuela	12.0	
6	Martha Meléndez	Colombia	12.0	
7	Belkis Fava	Argentina	12.1	
	Carla Herencia	Chile	?	

=== 200 metres ===
Heats – 3 November

Rank	Heat	Name	Nationality	Time	Notes
1	1	Carmela Bolívar	Peru	24.1	Q
2	1	Esmeralda de Jesus Garcia	Brazil	24.2	Q
3	1	Miriam Rojas	Colombia	24.4	Q
4	1	Elsa Antúnez	Venezuela	24.7	Q
5	1	Belkis Fava	Argentina	24.7	
6	1	Flavia Villar	Chile	25.1	
1	2	Beatriz Allocco	Argentina	24.0	Q
2	2	Tânia Miranda	Brazil	24.2	Q
3	2	Martha Meléndez	Colombia	24.5	Q
4	2	Glenis Báez	Venezuela	24.7	Q
5	2	Carla Herencia	Chile	25.1	
6	2	Zaida Núñez	Panama	25.5	
7	2	R. Heredia	Peru	26.5	

Final – 4 November

Rank	Name	Nationality	Time	Notes
1st place, gold medalist(s)	Beatriz Allocco	Argentina	23.5	
2nd place, silver medalist(s)	Tânia Miranda	Brazil	24.1	
3rd place, bronze medalist(s)	Esmeralda de Jesus Garcia	Brazil	24.1	
4	Miriam Rojas	Colombia	24.2	
5	Carmela Bolívar	Peru	24.3	
6	Elsa Antúnez	Venezuela	24.3	
7	Martha Meléndez	Colombia	24.3	
8	Glenis Báez	Venezuela	24.9	

=== 400 metres ===
Heats – 31 October

Rank	Heat	Name	Nationality	Time	Notes
1	1	Tânia Miranda	Brazil	55.4	Q
2	1	Margarita Grun	Uruguay	56.1	Q
3	1	María Ocoro	Colombia	56.7	Q
4	1	María Eugenia Guzmán	Chile	57.1	Q
5	1	Anabella dal Lago	Argentina	57.7	
6	1	Carmela Bolívar	Peru	58.3	
7	1	Virginia Davis	Venezuela	59.9	
1	2	Adriana Marchena	Venezuela	55.8	Q
2	2	Joyce dos Santos	Brazil	56.4	Q
3	2	Miriam Rojas	Colombia	56.5	Q
4	2	Marcela López	Argentina	57.0	Q
5	2	Nancy González	Chile	58.4	

Final – 1 November

Rank	Name	Nationality	Time	Notes
1st place, gold medalist(s)	Tânia Miranda	Brazil	54.2	CR
2nd place, silver medalist(s)	Margarita Grun	Uruguay	54.8	
3rd place, bronze medalist(s)	Miriam Rojas	Colombia	54.8	
4	Adriana Marchena	Venezuela	55.5	
5	Marcela López	Argentina	56.0	
6	María Eugenia Guzmán	Chile	56.4	
7	María Ocoro	Colombia	56.4	
8	Joyce dos Santos	Brazil	58.5	

=== 800 metres ===
Heats – 2 November

Rank	Heat	Name	Nationality	Time	Notes
1	1	Alejandra Ramos	Chile	2:11.5	Q
2	1	Yamila Medina	Colombia	2:12.0	Q
3	1	Joyce dos Santos	Brazil	2:17.0	Q
4	1	Virginia Davis	Venezuela	2:18.9	Q
5	1	Margarita Grun	Uruguay	2:19.0	
6	1	Olga Caccaviello	Argentina	2:22.5	
1	2	Nancy González	Chile	2:13.2	Q
2	2	Marcela López	Argentina	2:13.4	Q
3	2	Adriana Marchena	Venezuela	2:14.8	Q
4	2	Luz Villa	Colombia	2:14.8	Q
5	2	Rosa de Souza	Brazil	2:14.9	

Final – 3 November

Rank	Name	Nationality	Time	Notes
1st place, gold medalist(s)	Alejandra Ramos	Chile	2:04.2	AR
2nd place, silver medalist(s)	Nancy González	Chile	2:09.8	
3rd place, bronze medalist(s)	Adriana Marchena	Venezuela	2:10.4	
4	Yamila Medina	Colombia	2:12.4	
5	Joyce dos Santos	Brazil	2:13.5	
6	Rosa de Souza	Brazil	2:14.2	
7	Luz Villa	Colombia	2:15.1	

=== 1500 metres ===
31 October

Rank	Name	Nationality	Time	Notes
1st place, gold medalist(s)	Alejandra Ramos	Chile	4:23.2	CR
2nd place, silver medalist(s)	Teresa Rodríguez	Colombia	4:32.6	
3rd place, bronze medalist(s)	Mónica Regonesi	Chile	4:36.1	
4	Bernarda Osorio	Chile	4:39.5	
5	Maricela Montañez	Venezuela	4:47.6	
6	Rosa de Souza	Brazil	4:48.2	
7	Soraya Telles	Brazil	4:50.5	
8	Olga Caccaviello	Argentina	4:54.8	

=== 100 metres hurdles ===
2 November

Rank	Name	Nationality	Time	Notes
1st place, gold medalist(s)	Yvonne Neddermann	Argentina	14.2	
2nd place, silver medalist(s)	Olga Verissimo	Brazil	14.4	
3rd place, bronze medalist(s)	Beatriz Capotosto	Argentina	14.7	
4	Carla Campusano	Peru	14.7	
5	Patricia Deck	Chile	14.7	
6	Maria José Ferreira	Brazil	15.1	
7	Leonor Santana	Colombia	15.1	
8	Jule Araya	Chile	15.3	

=== 4 × 100 metres relay ===
2 November

Rank	Nation	Competitors	Time	Notes
1st place, gold medalist(s)	Argentina	Marisol Besada, Belkis Fava, Yvonne Neddermann, Beatriz Allocco	46.0	
2nd place, silver medalist(s)	Brazil	Maria Soares, Olga Verissimo, Esmeralda de Jesus Garcia, Sheila de Oliveira	46.1	
3rd place, bronze medalist(s)	Venezuela	Glennis Báez, Adriana Marchena, Elsa Antúnez, Yaneris Guerra	46.6	
4	Colombia	Miriam Rojas, Martha Meléndez, Álvarez, Luz Villa	46.7	
5	Peru	Carmela Bolívar, Brigitte Winter, R. Heredia, Carla Campusano	47.6	
6	Chile	Carla Herencia, Flavia Villar, Paz Abalos, María Eugenia Guzmán	47.7	

=== 4 × 400 metres relay ===
2 November

Rank	Nation	Competitors	Time	Notes
1st place, gold medalist(s)	Brazil	Maria Soares, Joyce dos Santos, Conceição Geremias, Tânia Miranda	3:42.0	AR
2nd place, silver medalist(s)	Chile	Maria Eugenia Guzman, Carla Herencia, Nancy González, Alejandra Ramos	3:44.6	
3rd place, bronze medalist(s)	Colombia	Ángela Mancilla, Luz Villa, Maŕia Ocoro, Miriam Rojas	3:45.1	
4	Argentina	Anabella dal Lago, Marcela López, Yvonne Neddermann, Marisol Besada	3:48.2	
5	Venezuela	Piñango, Virginia Davis, Adriana Marchena, Elsa Antúnez	3:56.3	
6	Peru	R. Heredia, Brigitte Winter, Carla Campusano, Carmela Bolívar	3:56.3	

=== High jump ===
1 November

Rank	Name	Nationality	Result	Notes
1st place, gold medalist(s)	Ana Maria Marcon	Brazil	1.75	
2nd place, silver medalist(s)	Liliana Arigoni	Argentina	1.75	
3rd place, bronze medalist(s)	Beatriz Dias	Brazil	1.70	
4	Beatriz Arancibia	Chile	1.70	
5	Elizabeth Huber	Chile	1.70	
6	Iraima Parra	Venezuela	1.55	

=== Long jump ===
3 November

Rank	Name	Nationality	Result	Notes
1st place, gold medalist(s)	Themis Zambrzycki	Brazil	6.03	
2nd place, silver medalist(s)	Conceição Geremias	Brazil	5.95	
3rd place, bronze medalist(s)	Yvonne Neddermann	Argentina	5.92	
4	Araceli Bruschini	Argentina	5.75	
5	Beatriz Arancibia	Chile	5.56	
6	Tania Sangronis	Venezuela	5.42	
7	Ximena Mesa	Chile	5.40	
8	Alix Castillo	Venezuela	5.24	

=== Shot put ===
4 November

Rank	Name	Nationality	Result	Notes
1st place, gold medalist(s)	Magdalena Gómez	Colombia	13.94	
2nd place, silver medalist(s)	Themis Zambrzycki	Brazil	13.84	
3rd place, bronze medalist(s)	Maria Boso	Brazil	13.24	
4	Alejandra Bevacqua	Argentina	13.04	
5	Patricia Andrews	Venezuela	13.04	
6	Alicia Vicent	Uruguay	12.94	
7	Patricia Guerrero	Peru	12.86	
8	Jazmín Cirio	Chile	12.92	

=== Discus throw ===
2 November

Rank	Name	Nationality	Result	Notes
1st place, gold medalist(s)	Sandra Peres	Brazil	46.11	
2nd place, silver medalist(s)	Maria Boso	Brazil	42.54	
3rd place, bronze medalist(s)	Selene Saldarriaga	Colombia	41.78	
4	Miriam Yutronic	Chile	41.14	
5	Patricia Andrews	Venezuela	40.24	
6	Susana Diez	Argentina	40.14	
7	Lucía Azcune	Uruguay	39.88	
8	Ana Elena Gambaccini	Argentina	36.14	

=== Javelin throw ===
31 October

Rank	Name	Nationality	Result	Notes
1st place, gold medalist(s)	Marli dos Santos	Brazil	50.92	CR
2nd place, silver medalist(s)	Neusa Trolezzi	Brazil	45.07	
3rd place, bronze medalist(s)	Ana María Campillay	Argentina	42.30	
4	Patricia Guerrero	Peru	41.47	
5	Susana Diez	Argentina	40.47	
6	Marbella Navas	Venezuela	40.46	
7	Rosa Chamorro	Chile	36.04	

=== Pentathlon ===
31 October – 1 November

The highest mark recorded in each event is highlighted in yellow

Rank	Athlete	Nationality	100m H	SP	HJ	LJ	800m	Points	Notes
1st place, gold medalist(s)	Themis Zambrzycki	Brazil	14.4	13.28	1.75	5.89	2:33.1	4117	
2nd place, silver medalist(s)	Conceição Geremias	Brazil	15.0	12.26	1.63	4.99	2:14.8	3880	
3rd place, bronze medalist(s)	Yvonne Neddermann	Argentina	14.5	11.36	1.50	5.64	2:19.4	3833	
4	Alix Castillo	Venezuela	15.0	10.94	1.60	5.30	2:32.0	3632	
5	Evelyn Jabiles	Peru	14.9	11.20	1.66	5.29	2:42.1	3617	
6	Ximena Mesa	Chile	16.7	8.50	1.53	5.26	DNF	2560	
