= Athletics at the 1979 Summer Universiade – Men's 400 metres hurdles =

The men's 400 metres hurdles event at the 1979 Summer Universiade was held at the Estadio Olimpico Universitario in Mexico City on 10, 11 and 12 September 1979.

== Medalists ==
Gold	Silver	Bronze
Harry Schulting; Netherlands	Vasyl Arkhypenko; Soviet Union	James Walker; United States

== Results ==
=== Heats ===
Rank	Heat	Athlete	Nationality	Time	Notes
1	2	Harry Schulting	Netherlands	49.78	Q
2	2	Bart Williams	United States	50.15	Q
3	2	Nikolay Vasilyev	Soviet Union	50.25	q
4	1	Hugo Pont	Netherlands	50.60	Q
5	5	James Walker	United States	50.78	Q
6	2	Ian Newhouse	Canada	50.92	q
7	3	Rok Kopitar	Yugoslavia	50.98	Q
8	5	Fulvio Zorn	Italy	51.08	Q
9	1	Peter Haas	Switzerland	51.15	Q
9	4	Vasyl Arkhypenko	Soviet Union	51.15	Q
11	5	Lloyd Guss	Canada	51.18	q
12	5	Donizete Soares	Brazil	51.29	q
13	5	José Casabona	Spain	51.30	q
14	4	Felix Rümmele	Austria	51.38	Q
15	4	Germán Tejada	Spain	51.47	q
16	1	Takashi Nagao	Japan	51.50	q
17	2	Patrick Chazot	France	51.81	
18	4	Robert Williamson	Great Britain	51.84	
19	1	Mountage Diakhité	Senegal	51.85	
20	5	Peter Allen	New Zealand	52.02	
21	4	Jean-Claude Curtil	France	52.30	
22	3	Horia Toboc	Romania	52.41	Q
23	4	Washington Njiri	Kenya	52.41	
24	3	Bernd Herrmann	West Germany	53.02	
25	5	Bopaiah Kokkalera	India	53.03	
26	3	Jean-Prosper Rajaonarison	Madagascar	53.28	
27	2	Carlos Leal	Mexico	54.21	
28	3	Mohamed Jasem Al-Yagout	Kuwait	54.70	
29	3	Gabriel Leseku	Tanzania	55.97	
30	2	Arturo Girón	Guatemala	56.85	

=== Semifinals ===
Rank	Heat	Athlete	Nationality	Time	Notes
1	1	Vasyl Arkhypenko	Soviet Union	48.70	Q
2	2	Nikolay Vasilyev	Soviet Union	48.98	Q
3	1	Harry Schulting	Netherlands	49.06	Q
4	2	Hugo Pont	Netherlands	49.40	Q
5	1	James Walker	United States	49.79	Q
6	2	Bart Williams	United States	49.91	Q
7	1	Ian Newhouse	Canada	50.04	Q
8	1	José Casabona	Spain	50.06	NR
8	2	Rok Kopitar	Yugoslavia	50.06	Q
10	2	Lloyd Guss	Canada	50.22	
11	2	Felix Rümmele	Austria	50.68	
12	1	Fulvio Zorn	Italy	51.54	
13	1	Donizete Soares	Brazil	51.85	
13	2	Germán Tejada	Spain	51.85	
	1	Horia Toboc	Romania	??.??	
	2	Peter Haas	Switzerland	DQ	

=== Final ===
Rank	Athlete	Nationality	Time	Notes
1st place, gold medalist(s)	Harry Schulting	Netherlands	48.44	UR, NR
2nd place, silver medalist(s)	Vasyl Arkhypenko	Soviet Union	48.60	NR
3rd place, bronze medalist(s)	James Walker	United States	48.88	
4	Nikolay Vasilyev	Soviet Union	49.44	
5	Rok Kopitar	Yugoslavia	49.55	
6	Bart Williams	United States	49.70	
7	Hugo Pont	Netherlands	50.46	
8	Ian Newhouse	Canada	51.47	
