= Lizardi =

Lizardi is a surname of Basque origin. Notable people with the surname include:

- José Joaquín Fernández de Lizardi (1776–1827), Mexican writer and political journalist
- Reinaldo Lizardi (born 1954), Venezuelan sprinter
- Diego Lizardi (1975–2008), Puerto Rican athlete
