= Ivam Bertelli =

Personal information
- Born: 17 February 1955 (age 70)

Sport
- Sport: Athletics
- Event: Hammer throw
- Club: ASA

Ivam Bertelli (born 17 February 1955) is a retired Brazilian athlete who specialised in the hammer throw. He won several medals at continental level.

His personal best in the event is 64.22 metres set in São Paulo in 1983.

== International competitions ==
Year	Competition	Venue	Position	Event	Notes
Representing Brazil
1977	South American Championships	Montevideo, Uruguay	3rd	Hammer throw	63.40 m
1979	South American Championships	Bucaramanga, Colombia	4th	Hammer throw	56.60 m
1981	South American Championships	La Paz, Bolivia	1st	Hammer throw	62.40 m
1983	South American Championships	Santa Fe, Argentina	1st	Hammer throw	61.16 m
1987	South American Championships	São Paulo, Brazil	5th	Hammer throw	43.84 m
1988	Ibero-American Championships	Mexico City, Mexico	7th	Hammer throw	57.78 m
1991	South American Championships	Manaus, Brazil	4th	Hammer throw	60.32 m
2000	Ibero-American Championships	Rio de Janeiro, Brazil	9th	Hammer throw	54.68 m
