= José João da Silva =

Brazilian long-distance runner

Personal information
- Born: 5 May 1954 (age 72) Bezerros, Pernambuco, Brazil
- Height: 1.78 m (5 ft 10 in)
- Weight: 62 kg (137 lb)

Sport
- Sport: Long-distance running
- Event: 5000 metres

José João da Silva (born 5 May 1954) is a Brazilian long-distance runner. He competed in the men's 5000 metres at the 1984 Summer Olympics.

== International competitions ==
Year	Competition	Venue	Position	Event	Notes
Representing Brazil
1979	South American Championships	Bucaramanga, Colombia	6th	5000 m	14:37.0
1979	South American Championships	Bucaramanga, Colombia	6th	10,000 m	30:10.2
1980	Saint Silvester Road Race	São Paulo, Brazil	1st	8.9 km	23:40
1981	South American Championships	La Paz, Bolivia	4th	5000 m	16:25.4
1984	Olympic Games	Los Angeles, United States	36th (h)	5000 m	14:03.44
1984	Olympic Games	Los Angeles, United States	30th (h)	10,000 m	29:10.52
1985	Saint Silvester Road Race	São Paulo, Brazil	1st	12.640 km	36:48

== Personal bests ==
- 5000 metres – 13:37.4 (Buenos Aires 1980)
- 10,000 metres – 28:09.59 (Florence 1984)
