= José Elias =

José Elias may refer to:

- José Elías (c. 1678–c. 1755), Catalan organist and composer
- José Luis Elías (born 1954), Peruvian lawyer and politician
- José Luis Elias (sprinter) (born 1954), Peruvian sprinter
- José Miguel Elías (born 1977), Spanish cyclist
