= Athletics at the 1983 Pan American Games – Men's 4 × 100 metres relay =

Men's 4 × 100 metres relay at the Pan American Games

The men's 4 × 100 metres relay event at the 1983 Pan American Games was held in Caracas, Venezuela on 28 August.

== Results ==
Rank	Nation	Athletes	Time	Notes
1st place, gold medalist(s)	United States	Sam Graddy, Bernie Jackson, Ken Robinson, Elliott Quow	38.49	
2nd place, silver medalist(s)	Cuba	Osvaldo Lara, Leandro Peñalver, Silvio Leonard, José Isalgue	38.55	
3rd place, bronze medalist(s)	Brazil	Gerson de Souza, João Batista da Silva, Nelson dos Santos, Robson da Silva	39.08	
4	Canada	Mark McKoy, Cyprian Enweani, Tony Sharpe, Ben Johnson	39.24	
5	Trinidad and Tobago	Andrew George, Chris Braithwaite, Andrew Bruce, Hasely Crawford	39.40	
6	Jamaica	Steve Griffiths, Ray Stewart, George Walcott, Everard Samuels	39.53	
7	Venezuela	Ángel Andrade, Alberto Lugo, Hipólito Brown, Reinaldo Lizardi	40.44	
	Antigua and Barbuda		DNS	
