= José Salazar =

Venezuelan triple jumper

Personal information
- Full name: José Gregorio Salazar
- Born: December 9, 1957 (age 68)

Sport
- Country: Venezuela
- Sport: Men's Athletics
- Event: Triple jump
Medal record
Men's Athletics
Representing Venezuela
Pan American Games
Bronze medal – third place	1983 Caracas	Triple jump
Bolivarian Games
Gold medal – first place	1977 La Paz	Triple jump

José Gregorio Salazar (born December 9, 1957) is a retired triple jumper from Venezuela.

== International competitions ==
Year	Competition	Venue	Position	Event	Notes
Representing Venezuela
1977	Bolivarian Games	La Paz, Bolivia	1st	Triple jump	15.20 m A
1979	Central American and Caribbean Championships	Guadalajara, Mexico	2nd	Triple jump	16.23 m
1979	South American Championships	Bucaramanga, Colombia	5th	Long jump	7.13 m
1979	South American Championships	Bucaramanga, Colombia	1st	Triple jump	16.23 m
1982	Central American and Caribbean Games	Havana, Cuba	8th	Long jump	15.21 m
1983	Pan American Games	Caracas, Venezuela	3rd	Triple jump	16.26 m
