= Alejandro Silva (athlete) =

Chilean long-distance runner

Medal record

Athletics

Representing Chile

South American Games
| Gold medal – first place | 1982 Santa Fe | 10,000 m |
| Silver medal – second place | 1978 La Paz | Decathlon |
| Silver medal – second place | 1982 Santa Fe | 5,000 m |

José Alejandro Silva Flores (born July 28, 1958) is a retired male long-distance runner from Chile.

== Career ==
He represented his native country at the 1984 Summer Olympics. He set his personal best in the men's marathon (2:18.10) in 1985.

== Achievements ==
| Year | Competition | Venue | Position | Event | Notes |
Representing Chile
| 1976 | South American Junior Championships | Maracaibo, Venezuela | 3rd | 5,000 m | 15:01.25 |
| 1977 | South American Championships | Montevideo, Uruguay | 10th | 5000 m | 15:15.1 |
| 1977 | South American Championships | Montevideo, Uruguay | 7th | 10,000 m | 31:47.9 |
| 1979 | South American Championships | Bucaramanga, Colombia | 1st | 5,000 m | 13:57.2 |
| 1979 | South American Championships | Bucaramanga, Colombia | 4th | 10,000 m | 29:55.9 |
| 1982 | Southern Cross Games | Santa Fe, Argentina | 2nd | 5,000 m | 14:09.0 |
| 1982 | Southern Cross Games | Santa Fe, Argentina | 1st | 10,000 m | 29:35.9 |
| 1984 | Olympic Games | Los Angeles, United States | 56th | Marathon | 2:29:53 |
