= Olga Verissimo =

Brazilian athlete

Personal information
- Full name: Olga Maria Verissimo
- Born: 15 February 1959 (age 67)

Sport
- Sport: Athletics
- Events: Heptathlon, 100 m hurdles

Olga Maria Verissimo (born 15 February 1959) is a retired Brazilian athlete who specialised in the heptathlon and 100 metres hurdles. She won several medals at continental levels.

== International competitions ==
Year	Competition	Venue	Position	Event	Notes
Representing Brazil
1974	South American Junior Championships	Lima, Peru	2nd	Javelin throw	39.40 m
1975	South American Championships	Rio de Janeiro, Brazil	5th	Javelin throw	38.24 m
1975	South American Youth Championships	Quito, Ecuador	2nd	Javelin throw	36.76 m
1979	Pan American Games	San Juan, Puerto Rico	10th (h)	100 m hurdles	14.47
1979	Pan American Games	San Juan, Puerto Rico	4th	4 × 100 m relay	46.98
1979	Pan American Games	San Juan, Puerto Rico	4th	Pentathlon	3865 pts
1979	South American Championships	Bucaramanga, Colombia	2nd	100 m hurdles	14.4
1979	South American Championships	Bucaramanga, Colombia	2nd	4 × 100 m relay	46.1
1981	South American Championships	La Paz, Bolivia	5th	Javelin throw	39.44 m
1981	South American Championships	La Paz, Bolivia	2nd	Heptathlon	5116 pts
1983	Universiade	Caracas, Venezuela	11th	Heptathlon	5389 pts
1983	South American Championships	Santa Fe, Argentina	5th	Javelin throw	42.58 m
1983	South American Championships	Santa Fe, Argentina	2nd	Heptathlon	5371 pts
