= 1976 South American Junior Championships in Athletics =

XI South American Junior Championships in Athletics
- Dates: October 13–17
- Host city: Maracaibo, Venezuela
- Level: Under-19
- Events: 34
- Participation: about 152 athletes from 6 nations

The 11th South American Junior Championships in Athletics were held in Maracaibo, Venezuela, between October 13–17, 1976.

== Participation (unofficial) ==
Detailed result lists can be found on the "World Junior Athletics History" website. An unofficial count yields the number of about 152 athletes from about 6 countries: Brazil (46), Chile (22), Colombia (21), Peru (17), Uruguay (1), Venezuela (45).

== Medal summary ==
Medal winners are published for men and women Complete results can be found on the "World Junior Athletics History" website.

=== Men ===
Event	Gold		Silver		Bronze	
100 metres	Davis Castro (COL)	10.7	Oswaldo Félix (BRA)	10.7	José González (VEN)	10.8
200 metres	Pedro Caron (BRA)	21.9	Fermín Maldonado (VEN)	22.0	Enrique Regis (VEN)	22.1
400 metres	Antônio Dias Ferreira (BRA)	48.18	Enrique Regis (VEN)	48.73	William Wuycke (VEN)	48.88
800 metres	Leonardo Oliveira (BRA)	1:51.16	Antônio Dias Ferreira (BRA)	1:51.87	William Wuycke (VEN)	1:52.32
1500 metres	Víctor Gil (VEN)	3:53.52	Osmán Escobar (VEN)	3:55.17	Mario Aristizábal (COL)	3:59.63
5000 metres	Víctor Gil (VEN)	14:54.72	Silvio Salazar (COL)	15:01.15	Alejandro Silva (CHI)	15:01.25
110 metres hurdles	Nelson Rodríguez (VEN)	15.08	Luís Albieri (BRA)	15.36	Davis Castro (COL)	15.41
400 metres hurdles	Alfredo Edwards (CHI)	53.26	Nelson Rodríguez (VEN)	53.49	Rafael Corrêa (BRA)	54.75
2000 metres steeplechase	Osmán Escobar (VEN)	5:43.8	Víctor Gil (VEN)	5:46.7	Cristián Castillo (CHI)	5:50.6
4 × 100 metres relay	Brazil; Oswaldo Félix; Uribatan Fernandes; Pedro Caron; Antônio dos Santos	41.93	Venezuela; José González; Fermín Maldonado; Howard González; Anibal Vallenilla	42.42	Colombia; Javier Sarmiento; Williams Mosquera; Fernando Serna; Davis Castro	42.63
4 × 400 metres relay	Brazil; Homero Gomes; I. Reis; Leonardo de Oliveira; António Ferreira	3:14.70	Venezuela; Macoly Macgregor; William Wuycke; C. Casadiego; E. London	3:17.10	Chile; Hugo Vicuña; Alfredo Rossi; Eduardo Valenzuela; Cristián Molina	3:18.08
High jump	Tercius Ribeiro (BRA)	1.96	Alexandre Souza (BRA)	1.96	Henry Pastorelli (PER)	1.96
Pole vault	Fernando Ruocco (URU)	4.20	Carlos da Silva (BRA)	3.90	Lionel Moretti (BRA)	3.90
Long jump	Elfio Bianchi (VEN)	6.90	Uribatan Fernandes (BRA)	6.66	Nilton Kurata (BRA)	6.75
Triple jump	Wilson da Conceição (BRA)	14.70	Baldomero Chirinos (VEN)	14.15	Carlos Harz (CHI)	14.00
Shot put	Fernando Barwinski (BRA)	14.67	Moacyr Amaral (BRA)	14.60	José Lara (CHI)	14.36
Discus throw	Antônio Cunha (BRA)	41.62	Elías Cruz (CHI)	38.36	Fernando Barwinski (BRA)	38.08
Hammer throw	Fernando Barwinski (BRA)	54.70	Gilberto Silva (BRA)	52.22	Mario Egnem (CHI)	50.72
Javelin throw	Manoel Bezerra (BRA)	61.64	Roberto Tignayer (CHI)	59.82	William Landaeta (VEN)	57.74
Decathlon	Eduardo Sotomayor (CHI)	5992	Andrés Vicuña (CHI)	5656	Ruben Albuquerque (BRA)	5478

=== Women ===
Event	Gold		Silver		Bronze	
100 metres	Esmeralda Freitas (BRA)	11.58	Barbara Nascimento (BRA)	11.90	Cecilia Etcheverry (COL)	12.28
200 metres	Esmeralda Freitas (BRA)	24.52	Cecilia Etcheverry (COL)	25.48	Miriam Rojas (COL)	25.99
400 metres	Alejandra Ramos (CHI)	55.33	Maria José Santos (BRA)	56.00	Soraya Telles (BRA)	57.19
800 metres	Alejandra Ramos (CHI)	2:10.14	Daise de Oliveira (BRA)	2:17.46	Zonia Galdoz (PER)	2:17.92
1500 metres	Alejandra Ramos (CHI)	4:45.11	María Zamorano (CHI)	4:46.97	Mara Führmann (BRA)	4:48.20
100 metres hurdles	Gloria Barturen (CHI)	14.30	Themis Zambrzycki (BRA)	14.50	Maria Ferreira (BRA)	15.16
4 × 100 metres relay	Brazil; Sheila dos Santos; Maria Herrera; Esmeralda de Jesus Garcia; Barbara do Nascimento	46.66	Colombia; Miriam Rojas; Cruz Ibargüen; Luz Villa; Cecilia Echeverry	48.32	Venezuela; Nora León; Maigualida Crespo; Deyanira Medina; Sorellis Bohorquez	49.90
4 × 400 metres relay	Brazil; C. de Souza; Daisy de Oliveira; Maria José Santos; Soraya Telles	3:52.24	Colombia; Cruz Ibargüen; Miriam Rojas; Cecilia Echeverry; Luz Villa	4:02.73	Peru; Adriana Monteiro; Cecilia Céspedes; Sonia Galdoz; Ena Guevara	4:05.31
High jump	Rosemarie Boeck (PER)	1.71	Ana Rojas (VEN)	1.68	Julia Araya (CHI)	1.65
Long jump	Themis Zambrzycki (BRA)	5.99	Gloria Barturen (CHI)	5.69	Esmeralda de Jesus Garcia (BRA)	5.68
Shot put	Themis Zambrzycki (BRA)	11.89	Elida Mabeline (BRA)	11.85	Patricia Guerrero (PER)	11.81
Discus throw	Zenaide Soares (BRA)	41.34	Elida Mabeline (BRA)	38.16	Selene Saldarriaga (COL)	36.24
Javelin throw	Patricia Guerrero (PER)	39.74	Magali Lopes (BRA)	39.34	Elizabeth Hernández (VEN)	38.48
Pentathlon	Themis Zambrzycki (BRA)	4124	Ana Maria de Oliveira (BRA)	3289	Carla Campuzano (PER)	2997

== Medal table (unofficial) ==
* Host nation (Venezuela)

Rank	Nation	Gold	Silver	Bronze	Total
1	Brazil (BRA)	19	16	9	44
2	Chile (CHI)	6	5	7	18
3	Venezuela (VEN)*	5	9	7	21
4	Peru (PER)	2	0	5	7
5	Colombia (COL)	1	4	6	11
6	Uruguay (URU)	1	0	0	1
Totals (6 entries)		34	34	34	102
