= Jhonny Pérez (athlete) =

Bolivian distance runner (born 1953)

Personal information
- Full name: Jhonny Pérez Muriel
- Born: 13 September 1953 (age 73) Cochabamba, Bolivia

Sport
- Sport: Athletics
- Events: 5000 m, 10,000 m, 3000 m steeplechase

Jhonny Pérez Muriel (born 13 September 1953) is a retired Bolivian distance runner. He won multiple medals at regional level.

He was later the torch lighter at the 1993 Bolivarian Games.

== International competitions ==
Year	Competition	Venue	Position	Event	Notes
Representing Bolivia
1978	Southern Cross Games	La Paz, Bolivia	1st	1500 m	4:11.5
1978	Southern Cross Games	La Paz, Bolivia	1st	5000 m	15:54.33
1978	Southern Cross Games	La Paz, Bolivia	1st	3000 m s'chase	9:53.08
1979	South American Championships	Bucaramanga, Colombia	6th	1500 m	3:50.6
1979	South American Championships	Bucaramanga, Colombia	3rd	5000 m	14:16.1
1979	South American Championships	Bucaramanga, Colombia	3rd	3000 m s'chase	8:58.6
1981	South American Championships	La Paz, Bolivia	2nd	1500 m	4:08.0
1981	South American Championships	La Paz, Bolivia	3rd	5000 m	15:59.4
1981	South American Championships	La Paz, Bolivia	2nd	3000 m s'chase	9:54.2
1981	Bolivarian Games	Barquisimeto, Venezuela	2nd	3000 m s'chase	9:02.90
1982	Southern Cross Games	Santa Fe, Argentina	6th	5000 m	14:30.2
1982	Southern Cross Games	Santa Fe, Argentina	4th	3000 m s'chase	9:10.5
1983	Ibero-American Championships	Barcelona, Spain	4th	5000 m	14:37.91

== Personal bests ==
Outdoor

- 1500 metres – 3:50.6h (Bucaramanga 1979)
- 5000 metres – 14:06.73 (Santiago 1984) former NR
- 10,000 metres – 29:05.75 (Santiago 1984) former NR
- 3000 metres steeplechase – 8:58.6h (Bucaramanga 1979) former NR
