= William Wuycke =

Venezuelan middle-distance runner

William Wuyke
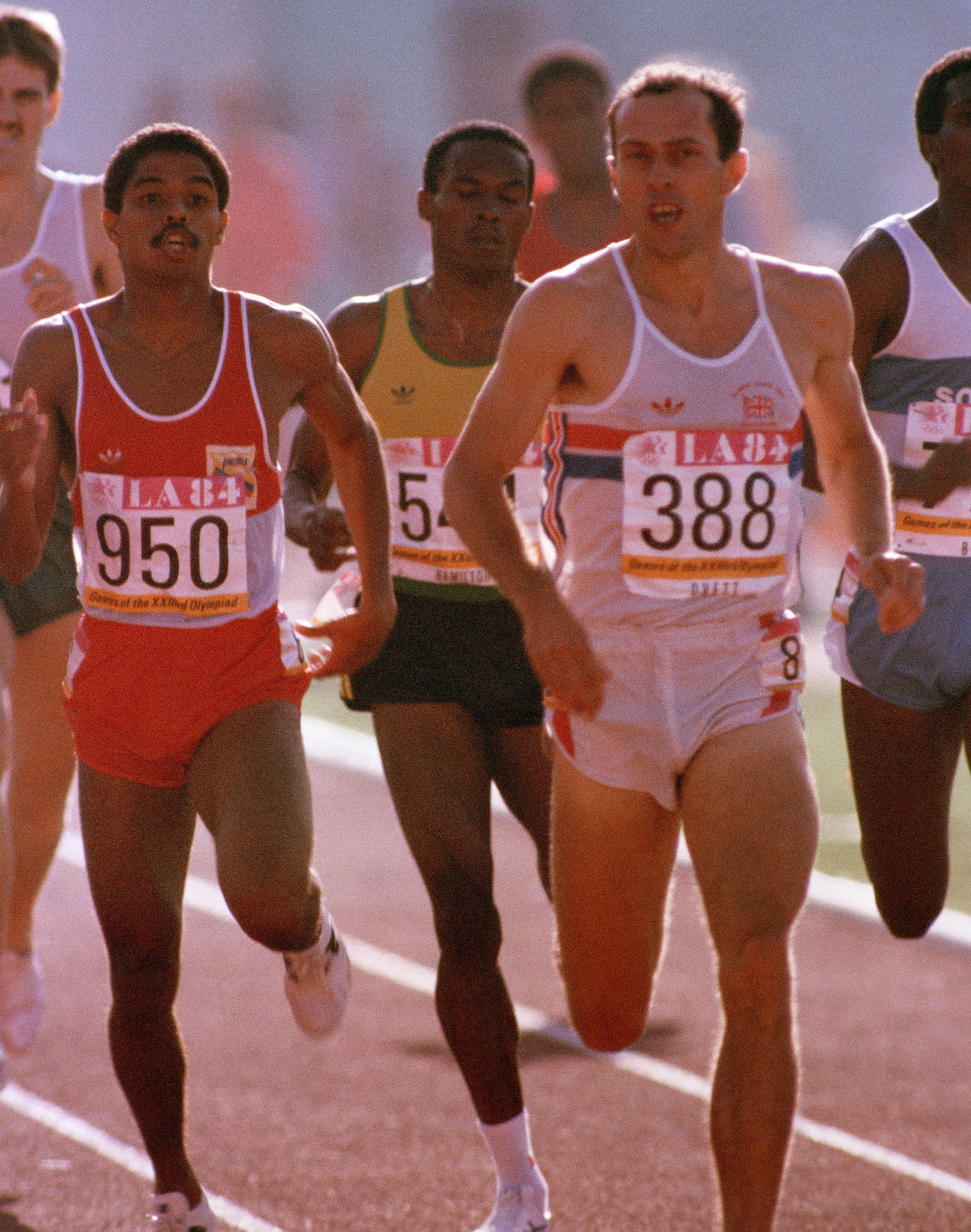
- Wuycke (left) competing in the 800 metres of the 1984 Olympics

Personal information
- Full name: William Carmelo Wuycke
- Nationality: Venezuelan
- Born: 28 May 1958 (age 68)
- Height: 5 ft 9 in (175 cm)

Sport
- Sport: Middle-distance running
- Event: 800 metres
- College team: Alabama

William Carmelo Wuycke (born May 21, 1958) is a former Venezuelan 800m runner, who set a personal best of 1:43.54 minutes at a 1986 meeting in Rieti (the race was won by Steve Cram). This result made Wuycke (as of 2021) the third-fastest South American 800m runner of all time. He finished fourth in the 800 metres at the 1987 Pan American Games. He carried the flag for his native country at the opening ceremony at the 1984 Summer Olympics in Los Angeles, California.

== Early life ==
The son of Carmelo and Rosa Wuycke, William Wuycke grew up in Parroquia La Pastora, Caracas. He attended the Madariaga primary school and Agustín Aveledo secondary school. Wuyke then studied physical education at Universidad Pedagógica Experimental Libertador (UPEL) in Caracas, followed by philosophy at Colegio Universitario de Caracas (CUC), before matriculating at the University of Alabama.

Health problems troubled Wuyke throughout his childhood; he had respiratory difficulties, minor heart problems, and spina bifida. In a short video documentary, Wuyke recollected, "It was not an easy life as a kid. I was pretty sick. I was walking straight with a corset... I couldn't train, I couldn't swim. Going to doctors and doctors and doctors...Seeing all my friends playing and I couldn't even play." Wuyke on Vimeo

Wuyke eventually found his way to the YMCA basketball court in La Pastora, where he encountered Venezuelan decathlete Luis Mijares, who asked him to come to Olympic Stadium at Central University of Venezuela (UCV). There, William Wuyke defeated Mijares in a 50-meter race, leading him to begin regular training at the stadium. It was here that he eventually met his longtime coach, Elavit Asmadt. Coach Asmdat was responsible for the development of many famous Venezuelan track and field athletes across multiple disciplines, including both short and long-distance runners.

== Athletics career ==
The Venezuelan Athletics Federation selected Wuyke to compete in the 1976 Central American and Caribbean Games in Xalapa, Mexico, where he won his first international gold medal.

On April 20, 1980, Wuyke ran 1:47.00 for 800 meters, the fastest performance for a high school athlete in the world at the time.

He competed at the 800 meter distance for Venezuela in the 1980 Summer Olympics. On July 25, 1980, Wuyke ran 1:47:38 in the third semi-final heat of the 800 metres.

In 1980, University of Alabama coach Bear Bryant offered Wuyke an athletic scholarship. Bryant wanted to use Wuyke's speed on the football field. Wuyke eventually joined the track team instead.

On June 2, 1983, Wuyke and his Alabama teammates ran 3:03.90 in the 4 × 400 metres relay. The following month, hewon the British AAA Championships title in the 800 metres event at the 1983 AAA Championships.

Wuyke won the 1,000 meter run at the 1984 NCAA Indoor Track and Field Championships with a time of 2:24.27.

Wuyke also competed in the 1984 Summer Olympics for Venezuela. He failed to advance to the 800 meter final, ending up 7th in the first semi-final heat with a time of 1:47.32.

As of March 2024, Wuyke remains Alabama's outdoor 800 meter record holder having run 1:43.93 in Zurich, Switzerland on August 13, 1985.

Wuyke continued competing after graduating from the University of Alabama. On September 7, 1986, in Rieti, Italy, he ran a personal best 1:43.54 in the 800 meter run. This was the third fastest time in the world in 1986, just 35 hundredths of a second behind world leader Steve Cram, who set his 1:43.19 mark in the same race as Wuyke. As of March 2024, Wuyke's mark is still the Venezuelan national record.

Wuyke's last major international appearance was in Lausanne, Switzerland at the Stade olympique de la Pontaise, where he ran 1:50.34 for the 800 meters on July 12, 1990.

== International competitions ==
| Year | Competition | Venue | Position | Event | Notes |
Representing Venezuela
| 1976 | Central American and Caribbean Junior; Championships (U20) | Xalapa, Mexico | 1st | 800 m | 1:53.58 A |
| 1976 | South American Junior Championships | Xalapa, Mexico | 3rd | 400 m | 48.88 |
| 1976 | South American Junior Championships | Xalapa, Mexico | 3rd | 800 m | 1:52.32 |
| 1976 | South American Junior Championships | Xalapa, Mexico | 2nd | 4 × 400 m relay | 3:17.10 |
| 1977 | South American Championships | Montevideo, Uruguay | 5th | 800 m | 1:56.4 |
| 1979 | South American Championships | Bucaramanga, Colombia | 2nd | 800 m | 1:47.9 |
| 1979 | South American Championships | Bucaramanga, Colombia | 1st | 4 × 400 m relay | 3:09.8 |
| 1980 | Olympic Games | Moscow, Soviet Union | 10th (sf) | 800 m | 1:47.4 |
| 1982 | Central American and Caribbean Games | Havana, Cuba | 2nd | 800 m | 1:45.75 |
| 1983 | World Championships | Helsinki, Finland | 46th (h) | 800 m | 1:50.71 |
| 1983 | Pan American Games | Caracas, Venezuela | – | 800 m | DNF |
| 1984 | Olympic Games | Los Angeles, United States | 13th (sf) | 800 m | 1:47.32 |
| 1986 | Central American and Caribbean Games | Santiago, Dominican Republic | 2nd | 800 m | 1:49.45 |
| 1987 | Central American and Caribbean Championships | Caracas, Venezuela | 1st | 800 m | 1:49.10 |
| 1987 | Pan American Games | Indianapolis, United States | 4th | 800 m | 1:48.34 |
| 1987 | World Championships | Rome, Italy | 20th (qf) | 800 m | 1:46.38 |
| 1989 | World Indoor Championships | Budapest, Hungary | 11th (sf) | 800 m | 1:53.52 |

== Masters athletics ==
On February 14, 1999, William Wuyke set a world masters record for the indoor 800 meter run with a time of 1:54.96, beating the previous record of 1:55.5 set by Ken Popejoy in 1993.

On March 28, 1999, William Wuyke won the 800 meter run at the USA National Masters Indoor Track & Field Championships, running 2:01.69.

== Coaching and teaching career ==
William Wuyke holds both a Bachelor of Science and Master of Science from the University of Alabama in health, physical education and recreation. Prior to his 2022 retirement, Wuyke served as an Adjunct Associate Professor of Physical Education, Strength and Conditioning Coach, and Director of the Connecticut College Fitness Center.

He has coached at the National Sports Institute in Caracas and as a graduate assistant at the University of Alabama. Wuyke was the youth sports coordinator at the Memphis Jewish Community Center. He joined the faculty of Connecticut College in 1990, serving as head coach of the track and field team through 2006.

Wuyke has trained multiple varsity teams at Connecticut College. He has also taught various fitness classes and organized informal workout groups for students.

=== Retirement from Connecticut College ===
In the spring of 2022, William Wuyke retired after 32 years of coaching, teaching, and motivating Connecticut College athletes, students, faculty and staff. He was recognized at the 2022 commencement for his numerous contributions to the college, including his guidance on the 2009 upgrade of fitness center at the athletic complex. Previously, he helped plan the 1996 improvements to the college's outdoor track.

== Recognition ==
Wuyke served as Venezuela's representative for the World Olympians Association at the 2008 Summer Olympics in Beijing.

On September 30, 2009, the Venezuelan Athletics Federation announced Wuyke would be inducted into its hall of fame. He was formally honored in ceremonies on October 9–10, 2009 in Caracas, Venezuela.

William Wuyke has also been recognized for his work in New London, Connecticut, helping area youth with both fitness and literacy. On January 29, 2010, he was honored with Connecticut College's Martin Luther King Service Award.

== See also ==
- Venezuelan records in athletics
