= Daniel Gómez (hammer thrower) =

Personal information
- Full name: Daniel Raúl Gómez
- Born: 21 July 1957 (age 69)

Sport
- Sport: Athletics
- Event: Hammer throw

Daniel Raúl Gómez (born 21 July 1957) is a retired Argentinian athlete who specialised in the hammer throw. He won multiple medals at regional level.

His personal best in the event is 64.66 metres set in Montevideo in 1977. His children Joaquín Gómez and Daniela Gómez are also hammer throwers.

== International competitions ==
Year	Competition	Venue	Position	Event	Notes
Representing Argentina
1975	South American Championships	Rio de Janeiro, Brazil	5th	Hammer throw	49.82 m
1977	South American Championships	Montevideo, Uruguay	1st	Hammer throw	64.66 m
1978	Southern Cross Games	La Paz, Bolivia	2nd	Hammer throw	62.38 m
1979	Pan American Games	San Juan, Puerto Rico	6th	Hammer throw	58.58 m
1979	South American Championships	Bucaramanga, Colombia	3rd	Hammer throw	57.60 m
1981	South American Championships	La Paz, Bolivia	3rd	Hammer throw	59.72 m
1982	Southern Cross Games	Santa Fe, Argentina	1st	Hammer throw	56.24 m
1983	Ibero-American Championships	Barcelona, Spain	3rd	Hammer throw	55.78 m
1983	South American Championships	Santa Fe, Argentina	4th	Hammer throw	55.36 m
1985	South American Championships	Santiago, Chile	1st	Hammer throw	60.26 m
1986	Ibero-American Championships	Havana, Cuba	6th	Hammer throw	58.34 m
1986	South American Games	Santiago, Chile	2nd	Hammer throw	59.62 m
