= Luis Barbosa =

Colombian long-distance runner

Luis Barbosa (born January 21, 1953) is a Colombian male long distance athlete. He was the only silver medalist for his country, in the 1979 Pan American Games (San Juan, Puerto Rico) in the men's marathon, and finished 34th, in the same event, in the 1980 Olympic Games (Moscow).

== Achievements ==
Year	Competition	Venue	Position	Event	Notes
Representing Colombia
1979	Pan American Games	San Juan, Puerto Rico	2nd	Marathon	2:24:44
1979	South American Championships	Bucaramanga, Colombia	1st	Marathon	1:56:12†
1980	Olympic Games	Moscow, Soviet Union	34th	Marathon	2:22:58

†Short course
