= Donizete Soares =

Brazilian athlete

Personal information
- Full name: Donizete de Araújo Soares
- Born: 18 May 1955 (age 71)

Sport
- Sport: Athletics
- Event: 400 metres hurdles

Donizete de Araújo Soares (born 18 May 1955) is a retired Brazilian athlete who specialised in the 400 metres hurdles. He won several medals at continental level. In addition, he represented his country at the 1979 Pan American Games.

== International competitions ==
Year	Competition	Venue	Position	Event	Notes
Representing Brazil
1977	South American Championships	Montevideo, Uruguay	2nd	400 m hurdles	54.1
1977	South American Championships	Montevideo, Uruguay	1st	4 × 400 m relay	3:15.1
1979	Universiade	Mexico City, Mexico	13th (sf)	400 m hurdles	51.85
1979	Universiade	Mexico City, Mexico	7th (h)	4 × 400 m relay	3:10.58
1979	Pan American Games	San Juan, Puerto Rico	6th	400 m hurdles	51.72
1979	Pan American Games	San Juan, Puerto Rico	5th	4 × 400 m relay	3:10.9
1979	South American Championships	Bucaramanga, Colombia	2nd	400 m hurdles	51.1
1979	South American Championships	Bucaramanga, Colombia	3rd	4 × 400 m relay	3:10.5
1981	South American Championships	La Paz, Bolivia	3rd	400 m hurdles	53.0

== Personal bests ==
Outdoor

- 400 metres hurdles – 50.4h (São Paulo 1979)
