= Silvio Salazar =

Colombian runner (born 1958)

Personal information
- Full name: Silvio Marino Salazar
- Born: 12 November 1958 (age 66) Tumaco, Colombia

Sport
- Sport: Athletics
- Events: 5000 metres; 10,000 metres; Half marathon
- Coached by: Domingo Tibaduiza

Silvio Marino Salazar (born 12 November 1958) is a retired Colombian long-distance runner. He won multiple medals at regional level.

== International competitions ==
Year	Competition	Venue	Position	Event	Notes
Representing Colombia
1976	South American Junior Championships	Maracaibo, Venezuela	2nd	5000 m	15:01.15
1976	South American Junior Championships	Maracaibo, Venezuela	6th	2000 m s'chase	6:09.6
1979	South American Championships	Bucaramanga, Colombia	1st	10,000 m	28:50.4
1981	Central American and Caribbean Championships	Santo Domingo, Dominican Republic	2nd	5000 m	14:12.06
1981	Central American and Caribbean Championships	Santo Domingo, Dominican Republic	1st	10,000 m	29:48.13
1981	South American Championships	La Paz, Bolivia	2nd	5000 m	15:51.4
1981	South American Championships	La Paz, Bolivia	2nd	10,000 m	32:57.1
1981	Bolivarian Games	Barquisimeto, Venezuela	1st	5000 m	14:13.93
1981	Bolivarian Games	Barquisimeto, Venezuela	1st	10,000 m	29:41.99
1983	Ibero-American Championships	Barcelona, Spain	1st	5000 m	13:52.19
1985	Central American and Caribbean Championships	Nassau, Bahamas	2nd	5000 m	13:54.00
1985	Central American and Caribbean Championships	Nassau, Bahamas	3rd	10,000 m	30:12.00
1985	South American Championships	Santiago, Chile	2nd	5000 m	14:03.18
1985	South American Championships	Santiago, Chile	3rd	10,000 m	29:03.34
1987	Central American and Caribbean Championships	Caracas, Venezuela	3rd	10,000 m	30:38.69
1988	Boston Marathon	Boston, United States	24th	Marathon	2:17:49
1989	South American Championships	Medellín, Colombia	2nd	5000 m	14:10.58
1989	South American Championships	Medellín, Colombia	3rd	10,000 m	30:14.3

== Personal bests ==
Outdoor

- 10,000 metres – 28:44.89 (Santiago 1984)
