= Pedro Cáceres =

Argentine middle-distance runner

Personal information
- Full name: Pedro Angel Cáceres
- Nationality: Argentine
- Born: 2 May 1960 (age 66)
- Height: 1.75 m (5 ft 9 in)
- Weight: 70 kg (154 lb)

Sport
- Sport: Middle-distance running
- Event: Steeplechase

Pedro Angel Cáceres (born 2 May 1960) is an Argentine middle-distance runner. He competed in the men's 3000 metres steeplechase at the 1984 Summer Olympics.

== International competitions ==
Year	Competition	Venue	Position	Event	Notes
Representing Argentina
1979	South American Championships	Bucaramanga, Colombia	3rd	800 m	1:48.5
1979	South American Championships	Bucaramanga, Colombia	2nd	4 × 400 m relay	3:10.5
1981	South American Championships	La Paz, Bolivia	4th	800 m	1:56.4
1983	Pan American Games	Caracas, Venezuela	6th	1500 m	3:48.59
1984	Olympic Games	Los Angeles, United States	29th (h)	3000 m s'chase	8:50.02

== Personal bests ==
Outdoor

- 400 metres – 48.7 (Santiago 1979)
- 800 metres – 1:48.5 (Bucaramanga 1979) former NR
- 1500 metres – 3:42.09 (Kansas City 1988)
- One mile – 4:14.0 (New York 1980) former NR
- 3000 metres – 8:11.71 (San Diego 1984)
- 5000 metres – 14:16.2 (Nashville 1987)
- 3000 metres steeplechase – 8:43.79 (Beaumont 1984)

Indoor

- 1500 metres – 3:47.0 (Bloomington 1987) former NR
- One mile – 4:04.97 (Indianapolis 1986) NR
