= Hipólito Brown =

Venezuelan sprinter

Personal information
- Full name: Hipólito Timothy Brown
- Born: 6 June 1957 (age 69)

Sport
- Sport: Athletics
- Event(s): 100 metres, 200 metres, 400 m

Hipólito Timothy Brown (born 6 June 1957) is a retired Venezuelan sprinter. He represented his country at the 1983 Pan American Games. In addition, he won multiple medals at regional level.

== International competitions ==
Year	Competition	Venue	Position	Event	Notes
Representing Venezuela
1974	South American Junior Championships	Lima, Peru	3rd	100 m	11.0
1974	South American Junior Championships	Lima, Peru	3rd (h)	4 × 100 m relay	42.8
1974	Central American and Caribbean; Junior Championships (U20)	Maracaibo, Venezuela	4th	100 m	10.93 (w)
1974	Central American and Caribbean; Junior Championships (U20)	Maracaibo, Venezuela	3rd	4 × 100 m relay	42.18
1977	Central American and Caribbean Championships	Xalapa, Mexico	2nd	4 × 400 m relay	3:10.39
1977	South American Championships	Montevideo, Uruguay	3rd	200 m	22.1
1977	South American Championships	Montevideo, Uruguay	4th	400 m	48.36
1977	South American Championships	Montevideo, Uruguay	2nd	4 × 100 m relay	41.7
1977	South American Championships	Montevideo, Uruguay	2nd	4 × 400 m relay	3:17.4
1977	Bolivarian Games	La Paz, Bolivia	2nd	400 m	46.97
1977	Bolivarian Games	La Paz, Bolivia	1st	4 × 400 m relay	3:12.85
1978	Central American and Caribbean Games	Medellín, Colombia	5th	4 × 400 m relay	3:08.51
1979	Central American and Caribbean Championships	Guadalajara, Mexico	2nd	4 × 400 m relay	3:08.9
1979	South American Championships	Bucaramanga, Colombia	1st	4 × 400 m relay	3:09.8
1981	Bolivarian Games	Barquisimeto, Venezuela	2nd	100 m	10.84
1981	Bolivarian Games	Barquisimeto, Venezuela	4th	200 m	21.27
1982	Central American and Caribbean Games	Havana, Cuba	4th	4 × 100 m relay	40.15
1983	Central American and Caribbean Championships	Havana, Cuba	4th	100 m	10.49
1983	Central American and Caribbean Championships	Havana, Cuba	3rd	4 × 100 m relay	40.64
1983	Pan American Games	Caracas, Venezuela	12th (sf)	100 m	10.65
1983	Pan American Games	Caracas, Venezuela	13th (h)	200 m	21.34
1983	Pan American Games	Caracas, Venezuela	7th	4 × 100 m relay	40.44
1983	Pan American Games	Caracas, Venezuela	5th	4 × 400 m relay	3:06.50

== Personal bests ==
Outdoor

- 100 metres – 10.49 (+1.9 m/s, Havana 1983)
