= Cristián Molina (athlete) =

Chilean middle-distance runner

Personal information
- Full name: Cristián Eugenio Molina Cifuentes
- Born: 16 October 1959 (age 66)

Sport
- Sport: Athletics
- Event(s): 800 metres, 1500 metres

Cristián Eugenio Molina Cifuentes (born 16 October 1959) is a retired Chilean middle-distance runner who specialised in the 800 metres. He won several medals at continental level.

== International competitions ==
Year	Competition	Venue	Position	Event	Notes
Representing Chile
1976	South American Junior Championships	Maracaibo, Venezuela	5th	400 m	50.15
1976	South American Junior Championships	Maracaibo, Venezuela	4th	800 m	1:52.99
1976	South American Junior Championships	Maracaibo, Venezuela	3rd	4 × 400 m relay	3:18.08
1977	South American Championships	Montevideo, Uruguay	4th	800 m	1:54.4
1977	South American Championships	Montevideo, Uruguay	3rd	4 × 400 m relay	3:23.1
1979	Pan American Games	San Juan, Puerto Rico	8th	800 m	1:51.7
1979	South American Championships	Bucaramanga, Colombia	1st	800 m	1:47.8
1979	South American Championships	Bucaramanga, Colombia	5th	4 × 400 m relay	3:15.6
1980	Liberty Bell Classic	Philadelphia, United States	8th	800 m	1:50.50
1981	South American Championships	La Paz, Bolivia	1st	800 m	1:53.6
1985	South American Championships	Santiago, Chile	4th	800 m	1:49.90

== Personal bests ==
Outdoor

- 800 metres – 1:47.35 (Fürth 1980)
- 1500 metres – 3:44.96 (1981)
