= José Casabona =

Spanish sprinter

Personal information
- Nationality: Spanish
- Born: 8 February 1957 (age 69) Zaragoza, Spain

Sport
- Sport: Athletics
- Event: 400 metres hurdles

José Casabona Perún (born 8 February 1957) is a Spanish sprinter. He competed in the men's 4 × 400 metres relay at the 1980 Summer Olympics.
