= Roger Soler =

Peruvian long-distance runner

Personal information
- Nationality: Peruvian
- Born: 20 September 1960 (age 65)
- Height: 1.75 m (5 ft 9 in)
- Weight: 68 kg (150 lb)

Sport
- Sport: Long-distance running
- Event: 5000 metres

Roger Soler (born 20 September 1960) is a Peruvian long-distance runner. He competed in the men's 5000 metres at the 1984 Summer Olympics. Soler finished eighth in the 10000 metres at the 1987 Pan American Games.
