= Francisco de Oliveira =

Brazilian writer (1933–2019)

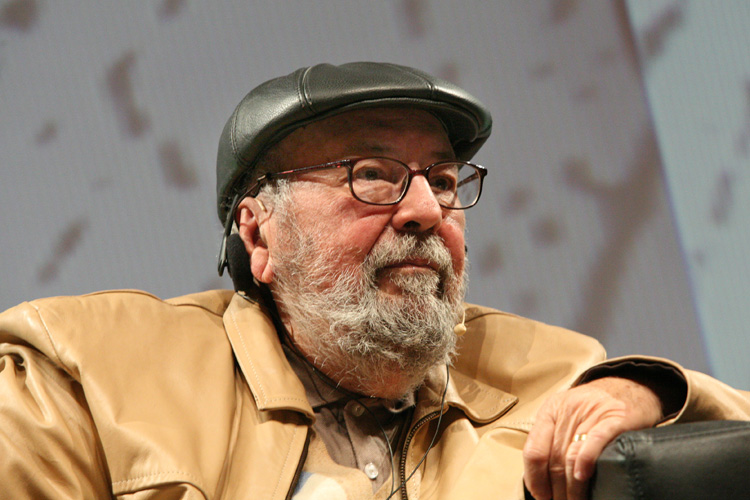
- Francisco de Oliveira in 2009
- Born: Francisco Maria Cavalcanti de Oliveira; November 7, 1933; Recife, Pernambuco, Brazil
- Died: July 10, 2019 (aged 85); São Paulo, Brazil
- Occupation: Sociologist

Francisco Maria Cavalcanti de Oliveira (November 7, 1933 – July 10, 2019), more known as Chico de Oliveira, was a Brazilian sociologist known for his analysis of capitalist development and inequality in Brazil. Born in Recife, he worked at Sudene with Celso Furtado, was exiled during the military regime, and later became a founding member of the Brazilian Center for Analysis and Planning (CEBRAP) and a professor at the University of São Paulo. In works such as Crítica à razão dualista (1972) and O ornitorrinco (2003), he argued that Brazil's economic modernization reinforced, rather than reduced, archaic forms of exploitation and social inequality. He was also a founding member of the Workers' Party (PT), which he later left.

== Biography ==
Francisco Maria Cavalcanti de Oliveira, known as Chico de Oliveira, was born in Recife, Pernambuco, in 1933. He graduated in Social Sciences from the University of Recife (current UFPE) in 1956, where he was one of the founders of the Socialist Student Movement of Pernambuco. He was influenced by the work of economist Celso Furtado and subsequently worked at the Superintendency for the Development of the Northeast (Sudene) between 1959 and 1964, an experience that provided him with direct observation of regional economic disparities and developmental policies. This period contributed to the formation of his analytical perspective on the structural characteristics of the Brazilian economy.

Following the military coup of 1964, Oliveira was arrested in Pernambuco and detained for two months. After being released, he went into exile, living in Guatemala and Mexico for two years, where he worked at the Economic Commission for Latin America and the Caribbean (ECLAC/CEPAL). Upon returning to Brazil in 1969, he became a founding member of the Brazilian Center for Analysis and Planning (Cebrap) in São Paulo at the invitation of Octavio Ianni, alongside intellectuals such as Fernando Henrique Cardoso and Roberto Schwarz. He was arrested again and tortured in 1974. During this period, he also joined the faculty of the University of São Paulo (USP) in 1988, where he taught for several decades, becoming professor emeritus in 2008. His work at Cebrap and USP established him as a central figure in Brazilian sociological thought.

Oliveira's theoretical contributions are primarily associated with his critiques of developmentalist interpretations of Brazil. In his 1972 essay Crítica à razão dualista ("Critique of Dualist Reason"), he argued against the idea that Brazil's underdevelopment stemmed from a dualism between a modern sector and a backward one. He proposed instead that the two were integrated, with the modern economy relying on and reproducing forms of "archaic" exploitation, such as informal and precarious labor that remained functional for Brazilian capitalism. He revisited this analysis in the 2003 essay O ornitorrinco ("The Platypus"), using the animal as a metaphor for a stalled and hybrid formation—neither fully developed nor merely underdeveloped—that was unable to overcome its structural inequalities. For this work, published together in the volume "Crítica à razão dualista/O ornitorrinco" by Boitempo Editorial, he received the Jabuti Prize in 2004 in the Humanities category.

Oliveira was politically active throughout his life and was among the founders of the Workers' Party (PT) in 1980, integrating its first executive board of the Wilson Pinheiro Foundation. He gradually distanced himself from the party in 2003, months after Lula assumed the presidency, citing disagreements with its policy directions, and later participated in the founding of the Socialism and Liberty Party (PSOL) in 2004. In 2003, he stated in an interview with Folha de S.Paulo that "Lula was never left-wing." In a July 2012 interview on the program Roda Viva, broadcast by TV Cultura, he offered a critical assessment of former president Luiz Inácio Lula da Silva. On that occasion, he stated that Lula "has no character" and is an "opportunist," and that he governed in a manner more privatist than Fernando Henrique Cardoso. The interview received public attention due to the directness of his criticism directed at a figure with whom he had previously shared political affiliations.

Throughout his career, Oliveira received several honors for his intellectual work. In addition to the Jabuti Prize, he was awarded the Juca Pato Prize. He was granted the title of Doctor Honoris Causa by the Federal University of Rio de Janeiro (UFRJ) in 2006 and by the Federal University of Paraíba (UFPB) in 2010, and was honored at the IV Curso Livre Marx-Engels in 2013. He continued to write and teach until his death in São Paulo on July 10, 2019. His work is recognized for its critical approach to orthodox interpretations of Brazilian development, and his essays remain reference points in discussions of social inequality and the dynamics of capitalism in Brazil.

== Works ==
- de Oliveira, Francisco (1982). Elegia para una re(li)gion: Sudene, Nordeste: planificacion y conflicto de clases. Fondo de Cultura Económica. ISBN 9789681611910.
- de Oliveira, Francisco (1987). O elo perdido: classe e identidade de classe. Editora Brasiliense.
- de Oliveira, Francisco (1992). Collor: a falsificação da ira. Imago Editora. ISBN 9788531202711.
- de Oliveira, Francisco (1992). Les idees politiques et morales de Pline l'Ancien. Instituto Nacional de Investigação Científica.
- de Oliveira, Francisco (1998). Os direitos do antivalor: a economia política da hegemonia imperfeita. Editora Vozes. ISBN 9788532619969.
- Tavares, Maria da Conceição; de Oliveira, Francisco (2000). Celso Furtado e o Brasil. Fundação Perseu Abramo. ISBN 9788586469367.
- de Oliveira, Francisco; Stédile, João Pedro; Neto, José Genoino (2000). Classes sociais em mudança e a luta pelo socialismo. Editora Fundação Perseu Abramo. ISBN 9788586469398.
- de Oliveira, Francisco (2003). A navegação venturosa: ensaios sobre Celso Furtado. Boitempo Editorial. ISBN 9788575590379.
- de Oliveira, Francisco; Schwarz, Roberto (2003). Crítica à razão dualista; O ornitorrinco. Boitempo Editorial. ISBN 9788575590362.
- de Oliveira, Francisco; Sant'Anna Arêas, Vilma (2008). Noiva da revolução; Elegia para uma re(li)gião. Boitempo Editorial. ISBN 9788575591253.
- de Oliveira, Francisco (2009). El neoatraso brasileño: los procesos de modernización conservadora, de Getúlio Vargas a Lula. Siglo Veintiuno. ISBN 9789876290692.
- de Oliveira, Francisco (2010). Hegemonia às avessas: Economia, política e cultura na era da servidão financeira. Boitempo Editorial. ISBN 9788575591642.
- de Oliveira, Francisco (2018). Brasil: uma biografia não autorizada. Boitempo Editorial. ISBN 9788575595930.
