= Boitempo Editorial =

Brazilian publisher

- Founded: 1995
- Founder: Ivana Jinkings
- Country of origin: Brazil
- Headquarters location: São Paulo
- Publication types: Books, ebooks
- Nonfiction topics: Marxism, political theory, black feminism, history, economics
- Official website: www.boitempoeditorial.com.br

Boitempo Editorial is an independent Brazilian publishing house, founded in 1995 by Ivana Jinkings, and has established itself as a reference in the humanities and political theory. In addition to publishing classic works by Marx and Engels, the publisher expands its reach through the semiannual journal Margem Esquerda, the YouTube channel TV Boitempo, and the Blog da Boitempo, which offers daily political analysis and essays by contemporary intellectuals. Based in São Paulo, the company maintains its editorial autonomy and is recognized for disseminating critical thought within the academic and cultural landscape of Latin America.

== History ==
Boitempo Editorial is a Brazilian company founded in 1995 by Ivana Jinkings, with its headquarters in São Paulo. The publishing house emerged with the goal of publishing works in the humanities, filling a market niche focused on critical thought in the period following the redemocratization of Brazil. The name of the publishing house is a reference to the title of a book by Carlos Drummond de Andrade and also to the former publishing house of her father, the bookseller and political activist Raimundo Jinkings. In its early years, the company diversified its catalog, but gained significant prominence in 1998 by publishing a commemorative edition marking the 150th anniversary of the Communist Manifesto.

The publisher's growth was consolidated with the launch of the Marx-Engels Collection, a project aimed at translating the complete works of these authors directly from German into Portuguese, employing specialized reviewers and academic footnotes. This technical rigor enabled Boitempo to establish partnerships with various universities and research institutions. In addition to classics, the publisher expanded its editorial line to include collections such as Mundo do Trabalho ("World of Labor"), coordinated by sociologist Ricardo Antunes, and works by contemporary international theorists, such as geographer David Harvey and philosopher Angela Davis.

Currently, Boitempo maintains a communication structure consisting of the semiannual journal Margem Esquerda, the Blog da Boitempo, and the TV Boitempo YouTube channel, which serves as a platform for disseminating debates and lectures. The publisher remains an independent company and has received several industry awards, such as the Prêmio Jabuti, in the Humanities and Economics categories. With three decades of operation, the institution is recognized for its editorial continuity and for maintaining a catalog focused on the political and sociological analysis of Brazilian and international reality.
