= Manuel Ramírez (athlete) =

Colombian sprinter (born 1957)

Personal information
- Full name: Manuel Ramírez Caicedo
- Nationality: Colombian
- Born: 7 December 1957 (age 68)
- Height: 1.72 m (5 ft 8 in)
- Weight: 60 kg (132 lb)

Sport
- Sport: Sprinting
- Event: 200 metres

Manuel Ramírez Caicedo (born 7 December 1957) is a Colombian sprinter. He competed in the men's 200 metres at the 1984 Summer Olympics.

== International competitions ==
Year	Competition	Venue	Position	Event	Notes
Representing Colombia
1979	South American Championships	Bucaramanga, Colombia	2nd	100 m	10.4
1979	South American Championships	Bucaramanga, Colombia	5th	200 m	21.2
1981	Bolivarian Games	Barquisimeto, Venezuela	4th	100 m	10.89
1981	Bolivarian Games	Barquisimeto, Venezuela	3rd	4 × 100 m relay	41.35
1981	Bolivarian Games	Barquisimeto, Venezuela	2nd	4 × 400 m relay	3:13.22
1984	Olympic Games	Los Angeles, United States	47th (h)	200 m	21.71
1984	Olympic Games	Los Angeles, United States	44th (h)	400 m	47.17

== Personal bests ==
Outdoor

- 200 metres – 21.1 (1979)
- 400 metres – 46.4 (Pereira 1984)
