= Katsuhiko Nakaya =

Brazilian sprinter (born 1957)

Personal information
- Born: 22 April 1957 (age 69) Araçatuba, Brazil
- Height: 1.78 m (5 ft 10 in)
- Weight: 70 kg (154 lb)

Sport
- Sport: Sprinting
- Event: 100 metres
Medal record
Representing Brazil
Summer Universiade
Bronze medal – third place	1981 Bucharest	4x400m relay

Katsuhiko Nakaya (born 22 April 1957) is a Brazilian sprinter. He competed in the 100 metres at the 1980 Summer Olympics and the 1984 Summer Olympics.

== International competitions ==
Year	Competition	Venue	Position	Event	Notes
Representing Brazil
1973	South American Youth Championships	Comodoro Rivadavia, Argentina	4th	100 m	11.9
1973	South American Youth Championships	Comodoro Rivadavia, Argentina	4th	200 m	24.9
1973	South American Youth Championships	Comodoro Rivadavia, Argentina	1st	4 × 100 m relay	44.3
1973	South American Youth Championships	Comodoro Rivadavia, Argentina	6th	Long jump	6.43 m
1974	South American Junior Championships	Lima, Peru	5th (h)	100 m	11.2
1974	South American Junior Championships	Lima, Peru	1st	4 × 100 m relay	41.9
1977	South American Championships	Montevideo, Uruguay	2nd	100 m	10.4
1977	South American Championships	Montevideo, Uruguay	2nd	200 m	21.7
1977	South American Championships	Montevideo, Uruguay	1st	4 × 100 m relay	41.4
1979	South American Championships	Bucaramanga, Colombia	2nd	200 m	20.8
1979	South American Championships	Bucaramanga, Colombia	2nd	4 × 100 m relay	40.2
1980	Olympic Games	Moscow, Soviet Union	41st (qf)	100 m	10.70
1980	Olympic Games	Moscow, Soviet Union	8th	4 × 100 m relay	39.54
1981	Universiade	Bucharest, Romania	15th (sf)	100 m	10.71
1981	Universiade	Bucharest, Romania	3rd	4 × 400 m relay	3:06.79
1981	South American Championships	La Paz, Bolivia	1st	100 m	10.1
1981	South American Championships	La Paz, Bolivia	1st	4 × 100 m relay	39.6
1983	Universiade	Edmonton, Canada	6th	100 m	10.45
1983	Pan American Games	Caracas, Venezuela	18th (h)	100 m	12.93
1984	Olympic Games	Los Angeles, United States	34th (qf)	100 m	10.69
1984	Olympic Games	Los Angeles, United States	8th	4 × 100 m relay	39.40
1986	Ibero-American Championships	Havana, Cuba	5th	100 m	10.59
1986	Ibero-American Championships	Havana, Cuba	1st	4 × 100 m relay	39.30
1988	Ibero-American Championships	Mexico City, Mexico	6th (extra)	100 m	10.59

== Personal bests ==
Outdoor

- 100 metres – 10.1h (São Paulo 1979)
- 100 metres – 10.25 (+0.5 m/s, Edmonton 1983)
- 200 metres – 20.7h (São Paulo 1983)
