= 1979 South American Championships in Athletics =

- Dates: 31 October–4 November
- Host city: Bucaramanga, Colombia
- Venue: Estadio Alfonso López Pumarejo
- Events: 37
- Participation: 240 athletes from 10 nations

The 1979 South American Championships in Athletics were held in Bucaramanga, Colombia, between 31 October and 4 November.

It was the last edition to feature women's pentathlon before replacing it with the heptathlon. This edition also marked the first appearance of Panama at the championships.

== Medal summary ==
=== Men's events ===
Event	Gold		Silver		Bronze	
100 metres	Altevir de Araújo; Brazil	10.1 CR	Manuel Ramírez; Colombia	10.4	Reinaldo Lizardi; Venezuela	10.6
200 metres	Altevir de Araújo; Brazil	20.5 CR	Katsuhiko Nakaia; Brazil	20.8	Héctor Daley; Panama	21.1
400 metres	Geraldo José Pegado; Brazil	46.20 CR	Antônio Dias Ferreira; Brazil	46.90	Héctor Daley; Panama	47.40
800 metres	Cristián Molina; Chile	1:47.8 CR	William Wuycke; Venezuela	1:47.9	Pedro Cáceres; Argentina	1:48.5
1500 metres	Emilio Ulloa; Chile	3:47.0 CR	José Velásquez; Venezuela	3:47.5	Wilson de Santana; Brazil	3:47.9
5000 metres	Alejandro Silva; Chile	13:57.2 CR	Domingo Tibaduiza; Colombia	14:03.4	Jhonny Pérez; Bolivia	14:16.1
10,000 metres	Silvio Salazar; Colombia	28:50.4	Domingo Tibaduiza; Colombia	28:51.2	Víctor Maldonado; Venezuela	29:37.3
Marathon †	Luis Barbosa; Colombia	1:56:12	Alfonso Torres; Colombia	1:57:25	Lucirio Garrido; Venezuela	1:59:30
3000 metres steeplechase	Germán Aranda; Colombia	8:52.3	Elói Schleder; Brazil	8:57.4	Jhonny Pérez; Bolivia	8:58.6 (NR)
110 metres hurdles	Wellington da Nóbrega; Brazil	14.4	Carlos dos Santos; Brazil	14.6	Andrés Lyon; Chile	14.9
400 metres hurdles	Antônio Dias Ferreira; Brazil	50.7 CR	Donizete Soares; Brazil	51.1	José Davis; Venezuela	51.5
4 × 100 metres relay	Venezuela; Reinaldo Lizardi; Ely Zabala; Esteban Briceño; Miguel Condé	40.0 CR	Brazil; Milton de Castro; Geraldo Pegado; Katsuhiko Nakaya; Altevir de Araújo	40.2	Argentina; Angel Gagliano; Gustavo Dubarbier; Carlos Gambetta; Ricardo Donda	40.4
4 × 400 metres relay	Venezuela; Hipolito Brown; Alexis Herrera; Oswaldo Zea; William Wuycke	3:09.8	Argentina; Gabriel Castellá; Carlos Gambetta; Pedro Cáceres; Angel Gagliano	3:10.5	Brazil; Donizete Soares; Wilson dos Santos; Antônio Ferreira; Geraldo Pegado	3:10.5
20 kilometres road walk †	Ernesto Alfaro; Colombia	1:29:31	Waldemar da Silva; Brazil	1:29:37	Jorge Quiñones; Colombia	1:29:51
High jump	Daniel Mamet; Argentina	2.12 CR	Geraldo Rodrigues; Brazil	2.09	Iraja Cecy; Brazil	2.09
Pole vault	Fernando Ruocco; Uruguay	4.70 CR	Tito Steiner; Argentina	4.60	Henry Gómez; Chile	4.45
Long jump	Oswaldo Torres; Venezuela	7.67	Carlos Gambetta; Argentina	7.58	Francisco de Oliveira; Brazil	7.57
Triple jump	José Salazar; Venezuela	16.23	Francisco de Oliveira; Brazil	16.15	Celso Pereira; Brazil	15.83
Shot put	Gert Weil; Chile	16.42	Jesús Ramos; Venezuela	16.22	José Jacques; Brazil	16.20
Discus throw	Sérgio Thomé; Brazil	56.10*	Luis Palacios; Venezuela	54.42*	José Jacques; Brazil	53.10*
Hammer throw	José Vallejo; Argentina	63.44	Celso de Moraes; Brazil	61.44	Daniel Gómez; Argentina	57.60
Javelin throw	Angel Garmendia; Argentina	72.32 CR	Orángel Rodríguez; Venezuela	70.32	Paulo Hasse; Brazil	68.84
Decathlon	Alfredo Silva; Chile	6991	Ramón Montezuma; Venezuela	6964	Claudio Escauriza; Paraguay	6791

=== Women's events ===
Event	Gold		Silver		Bronze	
100 metres	Beatriz Allocco; Argentina	11.7 =CR	Carmela Bolívar; Peru	11.8	Esmeralda de Jesus Garcia; Brazil	11.8
200 metres	Beatriz Allocco; Argentina	23.5	Tânia Miranda; Brazil	24.1	Esmeralda de Jesus Garcia; Brazil	24.1
400 metres	Tânia Miranda; Brazil	54.2 CR	Margarita Grün; Uruguay	54.8	Miriam Rojas; Colombia	54.8
800 metres	Alejandra Ramos; Chile	2:04.2 AR	Nancy González; Chile	2:09.8	Adriana Marchena; Venezuela	2:10.4
1500 metres	Alejandra Ramos; Chile	4:23.2 CR	Teresa Rodríguez; Colombia	4:32.6	Monica Regonesi; Chile	4:36.1
100 metres hurdles	Yvonne Neddermann; Argentina	14.2	Olga Verissimo; Brazil	14.4	Beatriz Capotosto; Argentina	14.7
4 × 100 metres relay	Argentina; Marisol Besada; Belkis Fava; Yvonne Neddermann; Beatriz Allocco	46.0	Brazil; Maria Teresa Soares; Olga Verissimo; Esmeralda de Jesus Garcia; Sheila de Oliveira	46.1	Venezuela; Glennis Báez; Adriana Marchena; Elsa Antúnez; Yaneris Guerra	46.6
4 × 400 metres relay	Brazil; Maria Teresa Soares; Joyce Felipe dos Santos; Conceição Geremias; Tânia Miranda	3:42.0 AR	Chile; María Eugenia Guzmán; Carla Herencia; Nancy González; Alejandra Ramos	3:44.6	Colombia; Ángela Mancilla; Luz Villa; Maŕia Ocoro; Miriam Rojas	3:45.1
High jump	Ana Maria Marcon; Brazil	1.75	Liliana Arigoni; Argentina	1.75	Beatriz Bonfim; Brazil	1.70
Long jump	Themis Zambrzycki; Brazil	6.03	Conceição Geremias; Brazil	5.95	Yvonne Neddermann; Argentina	5.92
Shot put	Magdalena Gómez; Colombia	13.94	Themis Zambrzycki; Brazil	13.84	Maria Boso; Brazil	13.24
Discus throw	Sandra Peres; Brazil	46.11	Maria Boso; Brazil	42.54	Selene Saldarriaga; Colombia	41.78
Javelin throw	Marli dos Santos; Brazil	50.92 CR	Neuza Trolezzi; Brazil	45.07	Ana María Campillay; Argentina	42.30
Pentathlon	Themis Zambrzycki; Brazil	4117	Conceição Geremias; Brazil	3880	Yvonne Neddermann; Argentina	3833

† = short course (c37km)
* = light implement (1.75 kg)
† = short course

== Medal table ==
Rank	Nation	Gold	Silver	Bronze	Total
1	Brazil (BRA)	13	18	12	43
2	Argentina (ARG)	7	4	7	18
3	Chile (CHI)	7	2	3	12
4	Colombia (COL)	5	5	4	14
5	Venezuela (VEN)	4	6	6	16
6	Uruguay (URU)	1	1	0	2
7	Peru (PER)	0	1	0	1
8	Bolivia (BOL)	0	0	2	2
8	Panama (PAN)	0	0	2	2
10	Paraguay (PAR)	0	0	1	1
Totals (10 entries)		37	37	37	111

== Participating nations ==
- Argentina (36)
- Bolivia (1)
- Brazil (49)
- Chile (41)
- Colombia (40)
- Panama (9)
- Paraguay (1)
- Peru (15)
- Uruguay (5)
- Venezuela (43)
