= Reinaldo Lizardi =

Venezuelan sprinter

Reinaldo Lizardi (born October 23, 1954) is a retired sprinter from Venezuela, best known for winning the bronze medal in the men's 100 metres at the 1979 South American Championships in Bucaramanga, Colombia.

== International competitions ==
| Year | Competition | Venue | Position | Event | Notes |
Representing Venezuela
| 1979 | South American Championships | Bucaramanga, Colombia | 3rd | 100 m | 10.6 |
| 1979 | South American Championships | Bucaramanga, Colombia | 1st | 4 × 100 m relay | 40.0 |
| 1982 | Central American and Caribbean Games | Havana, Cuba | 4th | 4 × 100 m relay | 40.15 |
| 1983 | Pan American Games | Caracas, Venezuela | 7th | 4 × 100 m relay | 40.44 |

== Personal bests ==
Outdoor

- 100 metres – 10.40 (Caracas 1979)
