= José Luis Elías =

Peruvian politician

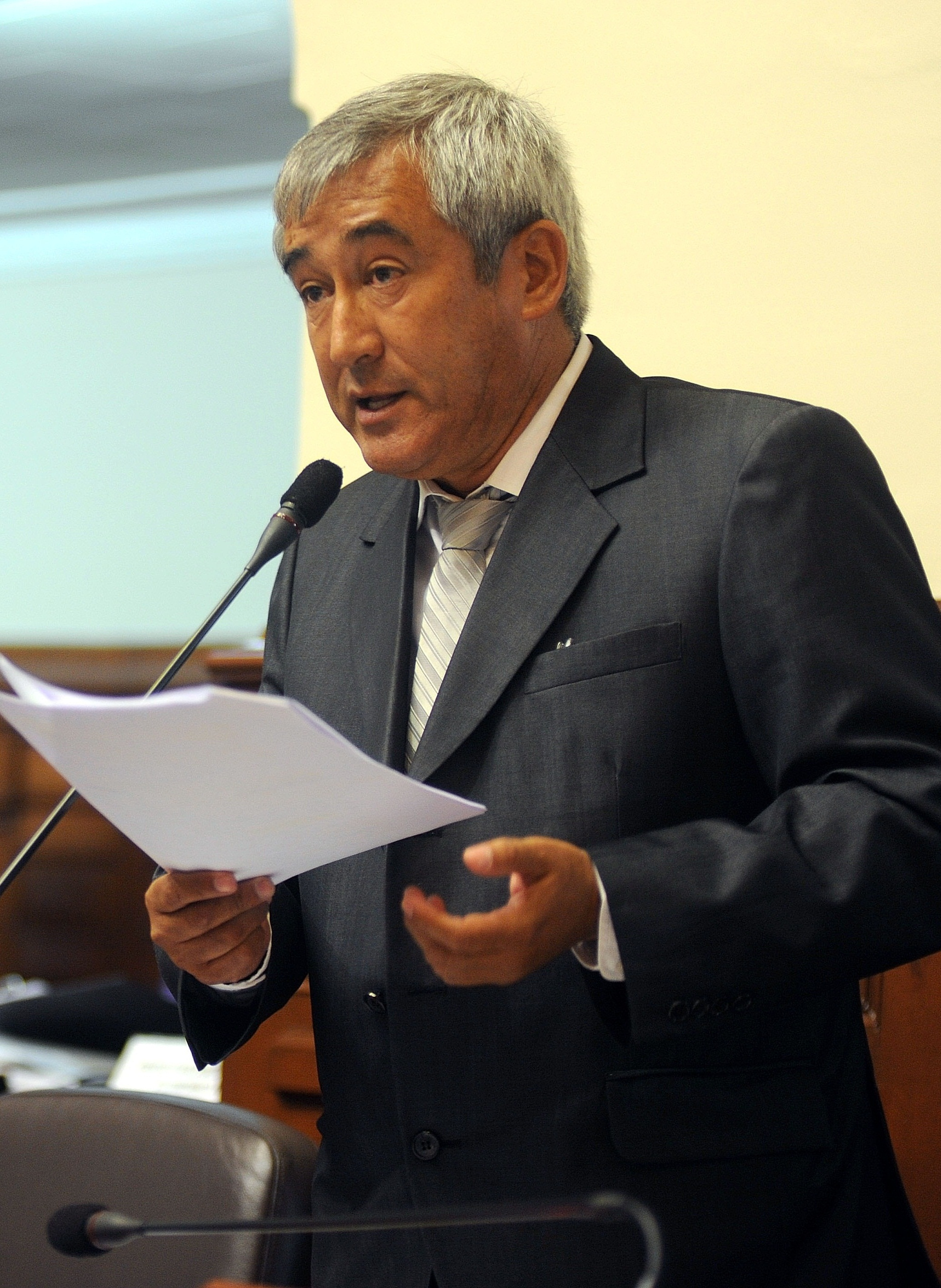

Member of Congress
- In office 27 July 2021 – 26 July 2026
- Constituency: Ica
- In office 26 July 2011 – 26 July 2016
- Constituency: Ica
- In office 26 July 2000 – 26 July 2001
- Constituency: National

Personal details
- Born: José Luis Elías Ávalos; 8 December 1954 (age 71) Ica, Peru
- Party: Podemos Perú (2020-present)
- Other political affiliations: Go on Country; Popular Force; People's Solution; Peru 2000; Avancemos; Cambio 90-New Majority
- Occupation: Politician
- Profession: Lawyer

José Luis Elías Ávalos (born 8 December 1954) is a Peruvian lawyer and politician. He was a congressman of the Republic on two occasions during the parliamentary period 2000–2001 and the parliamentary period 2011–2016. He is set to return to Congress after a five-year absence in 2021.

== Biography ==
He was born in Ica, Peru, on 8 December 1954, the son of Luis Abraham Elías Ghezzi and Hilda Graciela Ávalos Valdez. His brother Miguel Ángel Elías Ávalos was also a Congressman for Ica.

He completed his primary and secondary studies in his city of Lima graduating from the College of Our Lady of Guadalupe.

Between 1976 and 1983 he studied law at the Federico Villarreal National University in Lima. Since 2002 he was a director of the San Juan Bautista Private University. Likewise, he is indicated as owners of large tracts of land in the department of Ica, acquired during his tenure as a Fujimorist congressman.

== Sporting career ==
Ávalos competed in the men's 100 metres at the 1980 Summer Olympics.

== Political career ==
His first political participation occurred in the 1995 elections when he was a candidate for Congress under the Fujimorist Cambio 90-New Majority without obtaining representation.

In the 2000 elections, he was elected Congressman by the "Agrupación Independiente Avancemos" for the parliamentary period 2000–2005. However, after being elected, he formed the group of defectors who resigned from his party and went over to Peru 2000 (Fujimorism).

After the fall of the Fujimori dictatorship, his parliamentary position was reduced until 2001 when new presidential elections were called.

In the 2001 elections, he tried to be reelected as a candidate for the department of Ica of the "People’s Solution" alliance made up of former members of Fujimori, however he did not obtain representation.

In the 2011 elections, he again ran for Congress under Force 2011 and was elected Congressman for Ica for the 2011-2016 parliamentary term. During his second term as a congressman, he participated in the formulation of 146 bills, of which 30 were approved as law of the republic.

Finally, he participated in the 2018 regional elections as Go on Country candidate for the regional governorship of Ica without obtaining the election. He seeks his re-election as a congressman for Ica in the 2021 general elections for the Podemos Peru party, in which he was elected for the 2021–2026 term.
