= Great Society =

1960s programs of U.S. President Lyndon B. Johnson

Great Society programs
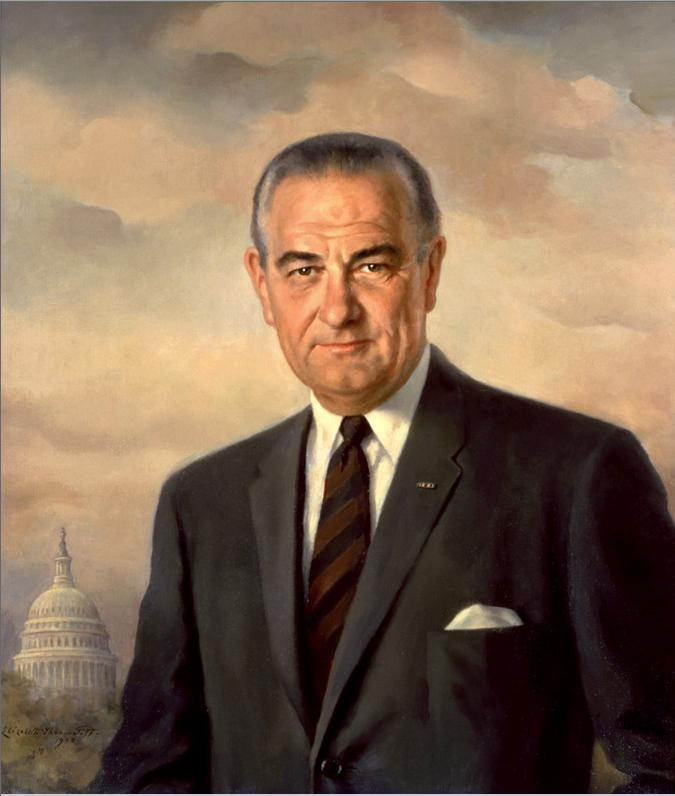
- President Lyndon B. Johnson's official White House portrait, by Elizabeth Shoumatoff

Agency overview
- Formed: May 7, 1964
- Dissolved: 1968 (legislative era)
- Jurisdiction: Federal government of the United States
- Status: Concluded
- Headquarters: Washington, D.C.
- Employees: Overlooked by the Office of Economic Opportunity
- Annual budget: Part of the Federal Budget
- Agency executives: Lyndon B. Johnson, President of the United States; Sargent Shriver, Director of the Office of Economic Opportunity
- Parent agency: Executive Office of the President of the United States
- Key document: * Civil Rights Act of 1964; Economic Opportunity Act of 1964; Voting Rights Act of 1965; Social Security Amendments of 1965

The Great Society was an initiative involving a series of domestic programs enacted by President Lyndon B. Johnson in the United States between 1964 and 1968, aimed at eliminating poverty, reducing racial injustice, and expanding social welfare in the country. Johnson first used the phrase on May 7, 1964 in a speech delivered at Ohio University, with presidential assistant Richard N. Goodwin credited with introducing the term. The Great Society sought to build on the legacy of former president Franklin D. Roosevelt's New Deal reforms of the 1930s, and planned to use the power of the federal government in order to address economic inequality, improve education and healthcare, and promote civil rights.

The post–World War II economic expansion had raised living standards for many Americans, but significant disparities remained, particularly for racial minorities and those living in impoverished rural and urban areas. The civil rights movement was gaining momentum, highlighting systemic racism and discrimination. Some of the Great Society initiatives were derived from New Frontier proposals which had stalled during the administration of John F. Kennedy, whom Johnson had succeeded in 1963. Johnson's success depended on his skills of persuasion and the Democratic Party's landslide victory in the 1964 elections, which made the 89th Congress the most liberal since 1938, with a supermajority in both chambers. In the 88th Congress it was estimated that there were 56 liberals and 44 conservatives in the Senate, and 224 liberals and 211 conservatives in the House. In the 89th Congress, by contrast, it was estimated that there were 59 liberals and 41 conservatives in the Senate, and 267 liberals and 168 conservatives in the House.

The core programs of the Great Society focused on the "War on Poverty", which increased federal involvement in education, employment, and healthcare. The Economic Opportunity Act of 1964 created a Job Corps and Volunteers in Service to America; the Food Stamp Act of 1964 provided low-income people assistance in purchasing food; the Elementary and Secondary Education Act of 1965 authorized federal expenditure on schools with low-income students; and the Social Security Amendments of 1965 created Medicaid, which funds some medical costs for low-income individuals, and Medicare, a health insurance program for people aged 65 and over. Measures designed to end racial injustice included the Civil Rights Act of 1964, which prohibited racial segregation in schools, public spaces, and workplaces; the Voting Rights Act of 1965, which ensured that minorities could exercise their right to vote; the Immigration and Nationality Act of 1965, which abolished quotas based on national origin and placed a greater emphasis on skills and links to U.S. citizens; and the Civil Rights Act of 1968, which prohibited housing discrimination. Additional projects included the National Endowment for the Arts; consumer protection measures; the Housing and Urban Development Act of 1965, which expanded the federal housing program; the Motor Vehicle Air Pollution Control Act of 1965, which limited motor vehicle emissions; and the National Trails System Act of 1968, which created a system of hiking trails.

Many of the Great Society projects were opposed by Republicans, who objected to what they considered "government handouts". Johnson's popularity declined as he committed more troops to the Vietnam War, which drew on resources that could have been directed toward the Great Society. Some projects were expanded under the administrations of Republican presidents Richard Nixon and Gerald Ford while others were dismantled, and funding for many was cut by Ronald Reagan.

== Economic and social conditions ==
Johnson's Great Society initiatives came during a period of rapid economic growth in the U.S., unlike the New Deal three decades earlier, which was a response to the Great Depression. Kennedy proposed an across-the-board tax cut lowering the top marginal income tax rate in the United States by 20%, from 91% to 71%, which was enacted in February 1964, three months after Kennedy's assassination, under Johnson. The tax cut also significantly reduced marginal rates in the lower brackets as well as for corporations. The gross national product rose 10% in the first year of the tax cut, and economic growth averaged a rate of 4.5% from 1961 to 1968.

GNP increased by 7% in 1964, 8% in 1965, and 9% in 1966. The unemployment rate fell below 5%, and by 1966 the number of families with incomes of $7,000 a year or more had reached 55%, compared with 22% in 1950. In 1968, when John Kenneth Galbraith published a new edition of The Affluent Society, the average income of the American family stood at $8,000, double what it had been a decade earlier.

== Johnson's speeches in Ohio and Michigan ==
Johnson's first public reference to the "Great Society" took place during a speech to students on May 7, 1964, on Ohio University's historic College Green in Athens, Ohio:

And with your courage and with your compassion and your desire, we will build a Great Society. It is a society where no child will go unfed, and no youngster will go unschooled.

He later formally presented his specific goals for the Great Society in another speech written by presidential assistants Bill Moyers and Richard N. Goodwin at the University of Michigan in Ann Arbor, Michigan, on May 22, 1964.

We are going to assemble the best thought and broadest knowledge from all over the world to find these answers. I intend to establish working groups to prepare a series of conferences and meetings—on the cities, on natural beauty, on the quality of education, and on other emerging challenges. From these studies, we will begin to set our course toward the Great Society.

== Presidential task forces ==
Almost immediately after the Ann Arbor speech, 14 separate task forces began studying nearly all major aspects of United States society under the guidance of presidential assistants Bill Moyers and Richard N. Goodwin. In his use of task forces to provide expert advice on policy, Johnson was following Kennedy's example, but unlike Kennedy, Johnson directed his task forces to work in secret. His intent was to prevent his program from being derailed by public criticism of proposals that had not yet been reviewed. The average task force had five to seven members and generally was composed of governmental experts and academics.

After the task force reports were submitted to the White House, Moyers began a second round of review. The recommendations were circulated among the agencies concerned, and strategies were developed for getting the proposed legislation through Congress. On January 4, 1965, Johnson announced much of his proposed program in his State of the Union Address.

== The election of 1964 ==
With the exception of the Civil Rights Act of 1964, the Great Society agenda was not a widely discussed issue during the 1964 presidential election campaign. Johnson won the election with 61% of the vote, and he carried all but six states. Democrats gained enough seats to control more than two-thirds of each chamber in the Eighty-ninth Congress, with a 68–32 margin in the Senate and a 295–140 margin in the House of Representatives.

Johnson won a large majority of the Jewish vote, a liberal constituency that gave strong support to the Great Society.

== The two sessions of the Eighty-Ninth Congress ==
The political realignment allowed House leaders to alter rules that had allowed Southern Democrats to kill New Frontier and civil rights legislation in committee, which aided efforts to pass Great Society legislation. In 1965, the first session of the Eighty-Ninth Congress created the core of the Great Society. It began by enacting long-stalled legislation such as Medicare and federal aid to education and then moved into other areas, including high-speed mass transit, rental supplements, truth in packaging, environmental safety legislation, new provisions for mental health facilities, the Teacher Corps, manpower training, the Head Start program, aid to urban mass transit, a demonstration cities program, a housing act that included rental subsidies, and an act for higher education. The Johnson Administration submitted 87 bills to Congress, and Johnson signed 84, or 96%, arguably the most successful legislative agenda in US congressional history.

== The major policy areas ==
=== Civil rights ===
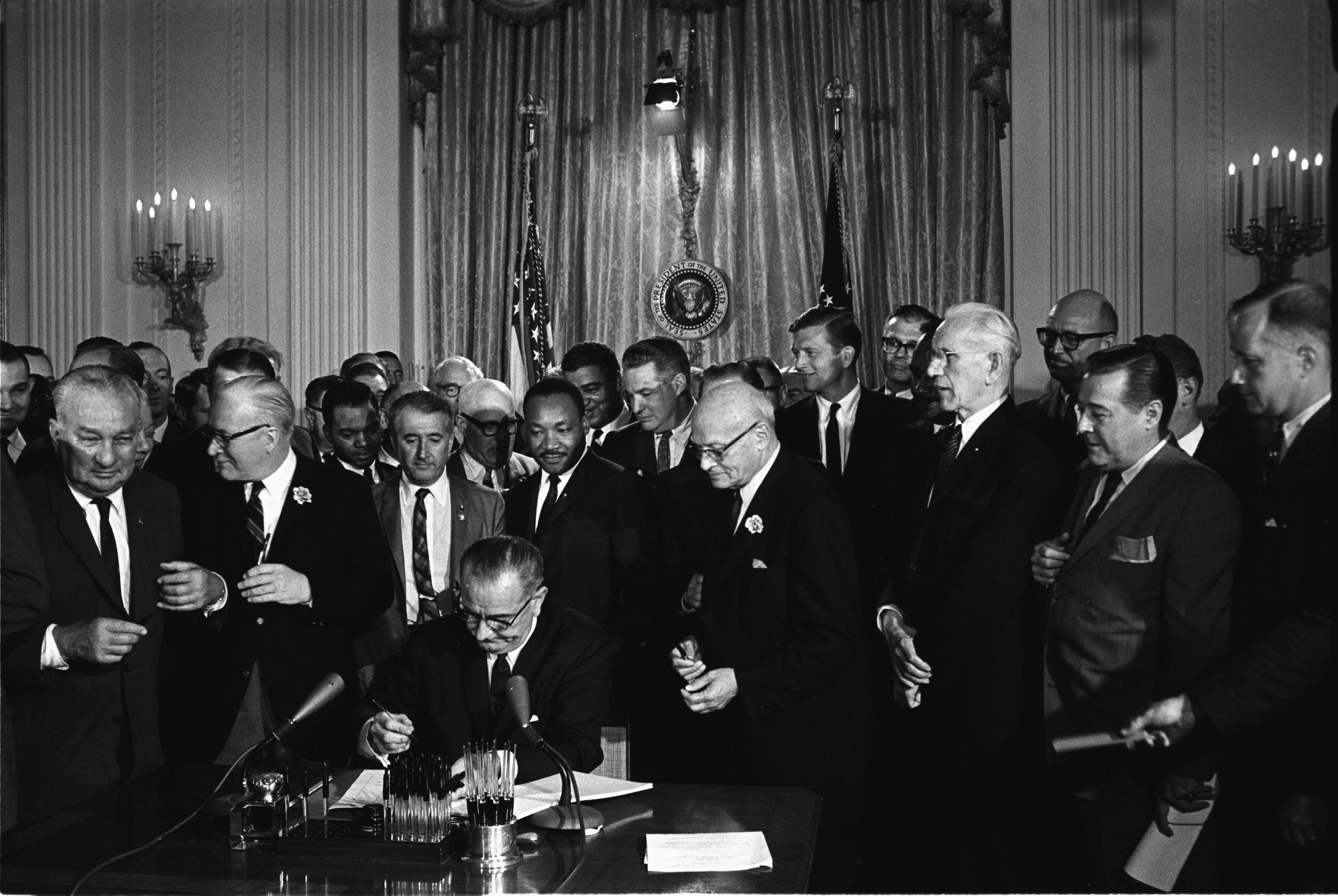
President Johnson signing the Civil Rights Act of 1964, July 2, 1964

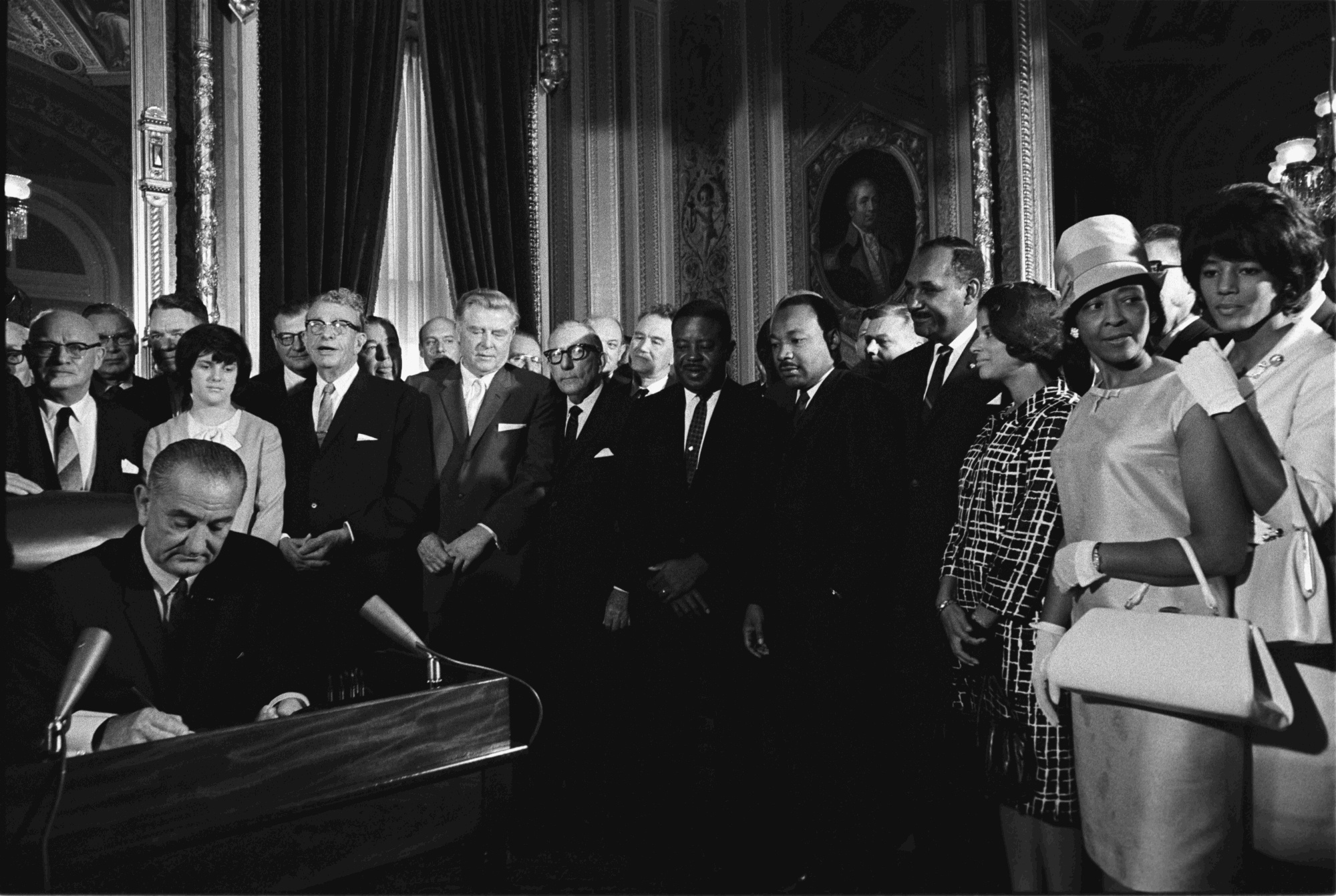
President Johnson signing the Voting Rights Act of 1965, August 6, 1965

Historian Alan Brinkley has suggested that the most important domestic achievement of the Great Society may have been its success in translating some of the demands of the civil rights movement into law. Four civil rights acts were passed, including three laws in the first two years of Johnson's presidency. The Civil Rights Act of 1964 forbade job discrimination and the segregation of public accommodations.

The Voting Rights Act of 1965 assured minority registration and voting. It suspended use of literacy or other voter-qualification tests that had sometimes served to keep African-Americans off voting lists and provided for federal court lawsuits to stop discriminatory poll taxes. It also reinforced the Civil Rights Act of 1964 by authorizing the appointment of federal voting examiners in areas that did not meet voter-participation requirements. The Immigration and Nationality Services Act of 1965 abolished the national-origin quotas in immigration law. The Civil Rights Act of 1968 banned housing discrimination and extended constitutional protections to Native Americans on reservations.

Johnson recognized the benefits and costs of passing civil rights legislation. His support for the 1964 Civil Rights Act was despite his personal opinions on racial matters, as Johnson regularly articulated thoughts and disparaging language against racial minorities, including against African-Americans and Asians. Scholar and biographer Robert Caro suggested that Johnson used racially charged language to appease legislators in an effort to pass civil rights laws, including adapting how he said the word 'negro' based upon where the legislator's district was located.

=== The War on Poverty ===
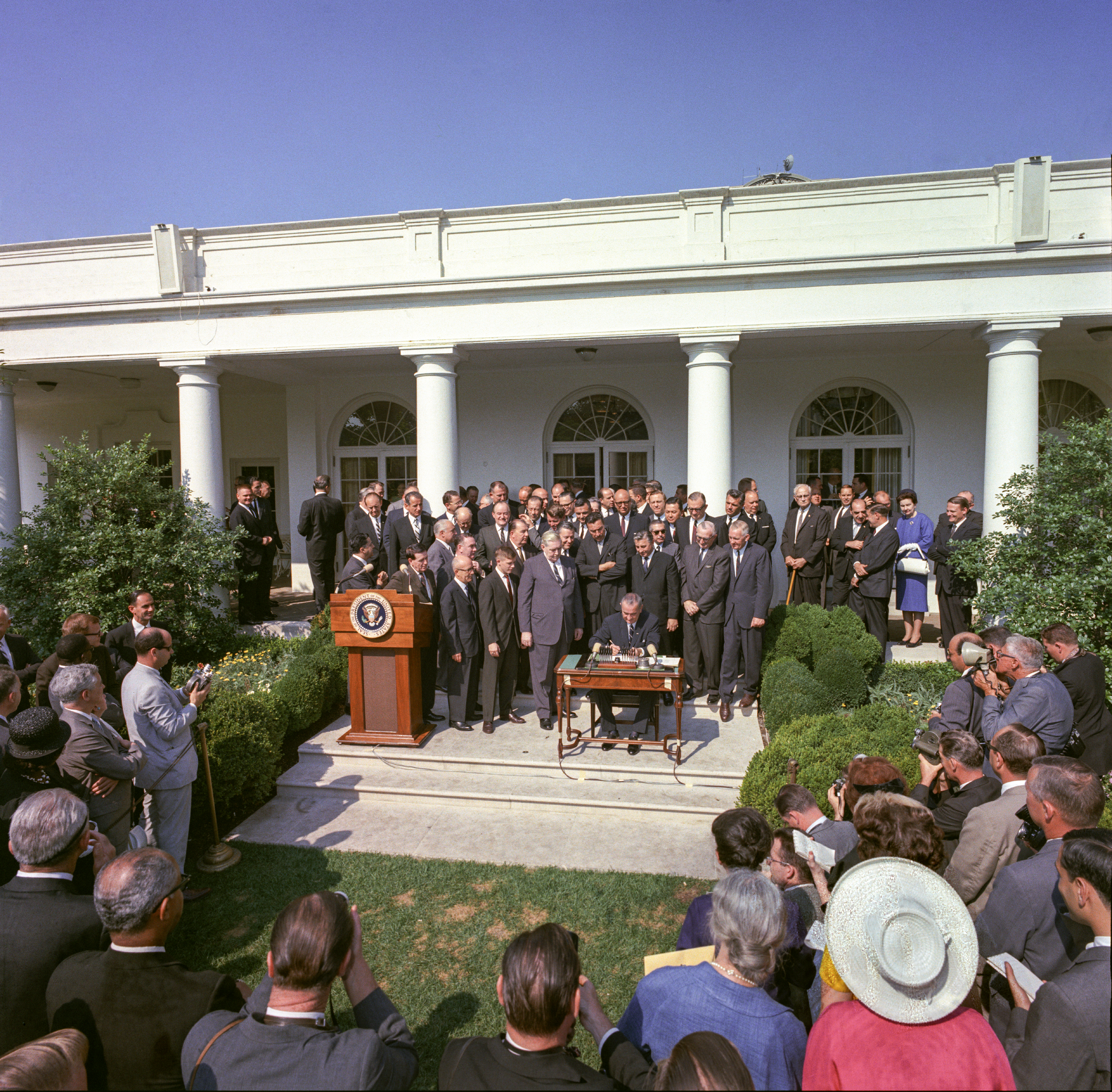
The August 1964 signing of the Poverty Bill

The most ambitious and controversial part of the Great Society was its initiative to end poverty. The Kennedy Administration had been contemplating a federal effort against poverty. Johnson, who, as a teacher, had observed extreme poverty in Texas among Latino-Americans, launched an "unconditional war on poverty" in the first months of his presidency with the goal of eliminating hunger, illiteracy, and unemployment from American life. The centerpiece of the War on Poverty was the Economic Opportunity Act of 1964, which created an Office of Economic Opportunity (OEO) to oversee a variety of community-based antipoverty programs.

Federal funds were provided for special education schemes in slum areas, including help in paying for books and transport, while financial aid was also provided for slum clearances and urban renewal. In addition, the Appalachian Regional Development Act of 1965 created jobs in one of the most impoverished regions of the country. The Economic Opportunity Act of 1964 provided various methods through which young people from poor homes could receive job training and higher education. A clause was also written into the Act to make sure (as noted by one observer) that "community action programs meet the real needs of the poor".

The OEO reflected a fragile consensus among policymakers that the best way to deal with poverty was not simply to raise the incomes of the poor but to help them better themselves through education, job training, and community development. Central to its mission was the idea of "community action", the participation of the poor in framing and administering the programs designed to help them.

==== Programs ====
The War on Poverty began with a $1 billion appropriation in 1964 and spent another $2 billion in the following two years. It gave rise to dozens of programs, among them the Job Corps, whose purpose was to help disadvantaged youth develop marketable skills; the Neighborhood Youth Corps, established to give poor urban youths work experience and to encourage them to stay in school; Volunteers in Service to America (VISTA), a domestic version of the Peace Corps, which placed concerned citizens with community-based agencies to work towards empowerment of the poor; the Model Cities Program for urban redevelopment; Upward Bound, which assisted poor high school students entering college; legal services for the poor; and the Food Stamp Act of 1964 (which expanded the federal food stamp program).

Programs included the Community Action Program, which initiated local Community Action Agencies charged with helping the poor become self-sufficient; and Project Head Start, which offered preschool education for poor children. In addition, funding was provided for the establishment of community health centers to expand access to health care, while major amendments were made to Social Security in 1965 and 1967 which significantly increased benefits, expanded coverage, and established new programs to combat poverty and raise living standards. In addition, average AFDC payments were 35% higher in 1968 than in 1960, but remained insufficient and uneven. Various initiatives were also carried out to meet the health needs of children.

=== Education ===
The most important educational component of the Great Society was the Elementary and Secondary Education Act of 1965, designed by Commissioner of Education Francis Keppel. It was signed into law on April 11, 1965, less than three months after it was introduced. It ended a long-standing political taboo by providing significant federal aid to public education, initially allocating more than $1 billion to help schools purchase materials and start special education programs to schools with a high concentration of low-income children. During its first year of operation, the Act authorized a $1.1 billion program of grants to states, for allocations to school districts with large numbers of children of low-income families, funds to use community facilities for education within the entire community, funds to improve educational research and to strengthen state departments of education, and grants for the purchase of books and library materials. The Act also established Head Start, which had originally been started by the Office of Economic Opportunity as an eight-week summer program, as a permanent program.

The Higher Education Facilities Act of 1963, which was signed into law by Johnson a month after becoming president, authorized several times more college aid within a five-year period than had been appropriated under the Land Grant College in a century. It provided better college libraries, ten to twenty new graduate centers, several new technical institutes, classrooms for several hundred thousand students, and twenty-five to thirty new community colleges a year.

This major piece of legislation was followed by the Higher Education Act of 1965, which increased federal money given to universities, created scholarships and low-interest loans for students, and established a national Teacher Corps to provide teachers to poverty-stricken areas of the United States. The Act also began a transition from federally funded institutional assistance to individual student aid.

In 1964, basic improvements in the National Defense Education Act were achieved, and total funds available to educational institutions were increased. The yearly limit on loans to graduate and professional students was raised from $1,000 to $2,500, and the aggregate limit was raised from $5,000 to $10,000. The program was extended to include geography, history, reading, English, and civics, and guidance and counseling programs were extended to elementary and public junior high schools. That same year, a major program of Federal support for nursing education was introduced.

The Bilingual Education Act of 1968 offered federal aid to local school districts in assisting them to address the needs of children with limited English-speaking ability until it expired in 2002.

The Great Society programs also provided support for postgraduate clinical training for both nurses and physicians committed to work with disadvantaged patients in rural and urban health clinics.

=== Health ===
==== Medicare ====
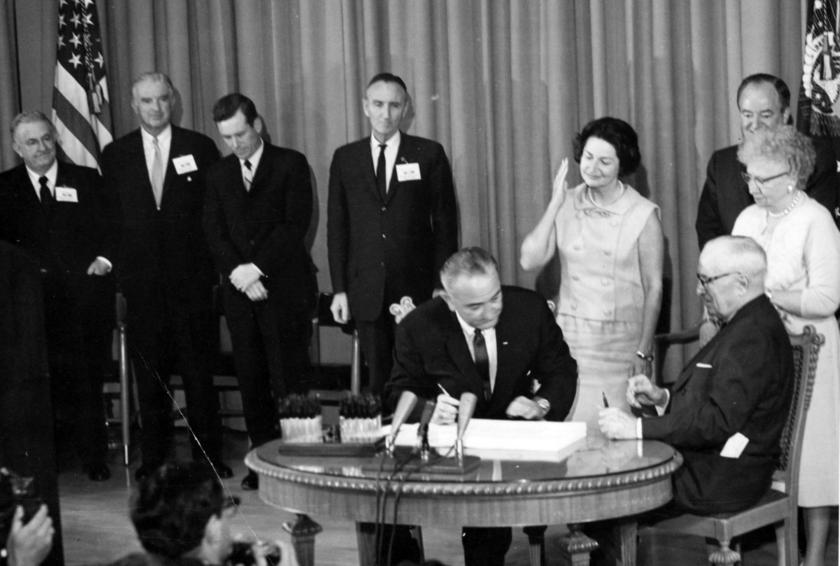
President Johnson signs the Social Security Act of 1965.

During the Kennedy Administration, a vote was taken in the Senate in July 1962 on whether or not to approve a proposal to provide medical care for the aged, known as Medicare. The proposal was narrowly defeated, with 52 votes against and only 48 votes in favor. Political experts believed that the 1962 midterm elections improved (as noted by one observer) “chances of passage of an administration-type medicare bill”, while also arguing that “if the measure gets to the floor of the House, it should win a majority.”

On August 31, 1964, an amendment to the proposed Social Security Amendments of 1964, which further increased the proposed level of Social Security benefits and added hospital insurance to the program, was passed in the Senate by a vote of 49 to 44. The following day the entire bill passed the Senate by 60 to 28 votes. Following this vote, as noted by one study, "Seeking to ensure that the health insurance proposal emerge from the conference committee as part of the report, the administration flirted with an effort to have the full House of Representatives vote to instruct the conference to yield to the Senate version. Though the health insurance provision appeared to have majority support in the House, the tactic did not, and the idea was dropped. Sure enough, the House conferees voted 3 to 2 against the Senate health provision; the Senate conferees voted 4 to 3 to accept a bill only if Medicare were included." Medicare finally came about with the Social Security Act of 1965 which authorized Medicare and provided federal funding for many of the medical costs of older Americans. The legislation overcame the bitter resistance, particularly from the American Medical Association, to the idea of publicly funded health care or "socialized medicine" by making its benefits available to everyone over sixty-five, regardless of need, and by linking payments to the existing private insurance system.

==== Medicaid ====
In 1966 welfare recipients of all ages received medical care through the Medicaid program. Medicaid was created on July 30, 1965, under Title XIX of the Social Security Act of 1965. Each state administers its own Medicaid program while the federal Centers for Medicare and Medicaid Services (CMS) monitors the state-run programs and establishes requirements for service delivery, quality, funding, and eligibility standards.

Services in most states under the new Medicaid program included preventive services, diagnostic screening, prosthetic devices, dentures, eye glasses, drugs, laboratory and X-ray services, dental care, physical therapy, private nurses, home health care, outpatient and clinic care, physicians’ services, nursing home care, and hospital care.

==== Neighborhood health centers ====
Under the Economic Opportunity Act of 1964's Community Action Program, as noted by one study, "hospitals, medical schools, community groups, and health departments received grants to plan and administer neighborhood health centers in low-income areas." One hundred neighborhood health centers had been set up under the Economic Opportunity Act by 1971.

=== Welfare ===
A number of changes were made to the Social Security program in terms of both coverage and adequacy of benefits. The Tax Adjustment Act of 1966 included a provision for special payments under the social security program to certain uninsured individuals aged 72 and over. The Social Security Amendments of 1965 included a 7% increase in cash benefits, a liberalization of both the definition of disability and amount of money a person can earn in benefits (the so-called retirement test), payment of benefits to eligible children aged 18–21 who are attending school, payment of benefits to widows at age 60 on an actuarially reduced basis, coverage of self-employed physicians, coverage of tips as wages, liberalization of insured-status requirements for persons already aged 72 or over, an increase to $6,600 the amount of earnings counted for contribution and benefit purposes (the contribution and benefit base), and an increase in the contribution rate schedule.

The Social Security Amendments of 1967 included a 13% increase in old-age, survivors, and disability insurance benefits, with a minimum monthly benefit of $55 for a person retiring at or after age-65 (or receiving disability benefits), an increase from $35 to $40 in the special age-72 payments, an increase from $1,500 to $1,680 in the amount a person may earn in a year and still get full benefits for that year, monthly cash benefits for disabled widows and disabled dependent widowers at age 50 at reduced rates, a liberalization of the eligibility requirements for benefits for dependents and Survivors of women workers, and an alternative insured-status test for workers disabled before age 31.

Additionally, new guidelines for determining eligibility for disability insurance benefits, additional non-contributory wage credits for servicemen, broadened coverage of clergy and members of religious orders who have not taken a vow of poverty, and an increase in the contribution and benefit base from $6,600 to $7,800, beginning in 1968. In addition, the Social Security Amendments of 1967 provided the first major amendments of Medicare. These social security amendments extended the coverage of the program to include certain services previously excluded, simplified reimbursement procedures under both the hospital and medical insurance plans, and facilitated the administrative procedures concerning general enrollment periods.

The Food Stamp Act of 1964 made the program permanent, while the Social Security Amendments of 1967 specified that at least 6% of monies for maternal and child health should be spent on family planning. By 1967, the federal government began requiring state health departments to make contraceptives available to all adults who were poor. Meal programs for low-income senior citizens began in 1965, with the federal government providing funding for "congregate meals" and "home-delivered meals". The Child Nutrition Act, passed in 1966, made improvements to nutritional assistance to children such as in the introduction of the School Breakfast Program.

=== The arts and cultural institutions ===
Johnson promoted the arts in terms of social betterment, not artistic creativity. He typically emphasized qualitative and quantitative goals, especially the power of the arts to improve the quality of life of ordinary Americans and to reduce the inequalities between the haves and the have-nots. Karen Patricia Heath observes that, "Johnson personally was not much interested in the acquisition of knowledge, cultural or otherwise, for its own sake, nor did he have time for art appreciation or meeting with artists."

==== National Endowments for the arts and the humanities ====
In September 1965, Johnson signed the National Foundation on the Arts and Humanities Act into law, creating both the National Endowment for the Arts and National Endowment for the Humanities as separate, independent agencies. Lobbying for federally funded arts and humanities support began during the Kennedy Administration. In 1963 three scholarly and educational organizations—the American Council of Learned Societies (ACLS), the Council of Graduate Schools in America, and the United Chapters of Phi Beta Kappa—joined to establish the National Commission on the Humanities. In June 1964, the commission released a report that suggested that the emphasis placed on science endangered the study of the humanities from elementary schools through postgraduate programs. To correct the balance, it recommended "the establishment by the President and the Congress of the United States of a National Humanities Foundation".

In August 1964, Representative William S. Moorhead of Pennsylvania proposed legislation to implement the commission's recommendations. Support from the White House followed in September, when Johnson lent his endorsement during a speech at Brown University. In March 1965, the White House proposed the establishment of a National Foundation on the Arts and Humanities and requested $20 million in start-up funds. The commission's report had generated other proposals, but the White House's approach eclipsed them. The administration's plan, which called for the creation of two separate agencies each advised by a governing body, was the version that the Congress approved. Richard Nixon dramatically expanded funding for NEH and NEA.

==== Public broadcasting ====
After the First National Conference on Long-Range Financing of Educational Television Stations in December 1964 called for a study of the role of noncommercial education television in society, the Carnegie Corporation agreed to finance the work of a 15-member national commission. Its landmark report, Public Television: A Program for Action, published on January 26, 1967, popularized the phrase "public television" and assisted the legislative campaign for federal aid. The Public Broadcasting Act of 1967, enacted less than 10 months later, chartered the Corporation for Public Broadcasting as a private, non-profit corporation.

The law initiated federal aid through the CPB for the operation, as opposed to the funding of capital facilities, of public broadcasting. The CPB initially collaborated with the pre-existing National Educational Television system, but in 1969 decided to start the Public Broadcasting Service (PBS). A public radio study commissioned by the CPB and the Ford Foundation and conducted from 1968 to 1969 led to the establishment of National Public Radio, a public radio system under the terms of the amended Public Broadcasting Act.

==== Cultural centers ====
Two long-planned national cultural and arts facilities received federal funding that would allow for their completion through Great Society legislation. A National Cultural Center, suggested during the Franklin Roosevelt Administration and created by a bipartisan law signed by Dwight Eisenhower, was transformed into the John F. Kennedy Center for the Performing Arts, a living memorial to the assassinated president. Fundraising for the original cultural center had been poor prior to legislation creating the Kennedy Center, which passed two months after the president's death and provided $23 million for construction. The Kennedy Center opened in 1971.

In the late 1930s the U.S. Congress mandated a Smithsonian Institution art museum for the National Mall, and a design by Eliel Saarinen was unveiled in 1939, but plans were shelved during World War II. A 1966 act of the U.S. Congress established the Hirshhorn Museum and Sculpture Garden as part of the Smithsonian Institution with a focus on modern art, in contrast to the existing National Art Gallery. The museum was primarily federally funded, although New York financier Joseph Hirshhorn later contributed $1 million toward building construction, which began in 1969. The Hirshhorn opened in 1974.

=== Transportation ===
Transportation initiatives started during President Johnson's term in office included the consolidation of transportation agencies into a cabinet-level position under the Department of Transportation. The department was authorized by Congress on October 15, 1966, and began operations on April 1, 1967. Congress passed a variety of legislation to support improvements in transportation including The Urban Mass Transportation Act of 1964 which provided $375 million for large-scale urban public or private rail projects in the form of matching funds to cities and states and created the Urban Mass Transit Administration (now the Federal Transit Administration), High Speed Ground Transportation Act of 1965 which resulted in the creation of high-speed rail between New York and Washington, and the National Traffic and Motor Vehicle Safety Act of 1966—a bill largely taken credit for by Ralph Nader, whose book Unsafe at Any Speed he claims helped inspire the legislation.

=== Consumer protection ===
In 1964, Johnson named Assistant Secretary of Labor Esther Peterson to be the first presidential assistant for consumer affairs.

The Cigarette Labeling and Advertising Act of 1965 required packages to carry warning labels. The Motor Vehicle Safety Act of 1966 set standards through creation of the National Highway Traffic Safety Administration. The Fair Packaging and Labeling Act requires products identify manufacturer, address, clearly mark quantity and servings. The statute also authorized the HEW and the FTC to establish and define voluntary standard sizes. The original would have mandated uniform standards of size and weight for comparison shopping, but the final law only outlawed exaggerated size claims.

The Child Safety Act of 1966 prohibited any chemical so dangerous that no warning can make it safe. The Flammable Fabrics Act of 1967 set standards for children's sleepwear, but not baby blankets.

The Wholesome Meat Act of 1967 required inspection of meat which must meet federal standards. The Truth-in-Lending Act of 1968 required lenders and credit providers to disclose the full cost of finance charges in both dollars and annual percentage rates, on installment loan and sales. The Wholesome Poultry Products Act of 1968 required inspection of poultry which must meet federal standards. The Land Sales Disclosure Act of 1968 provided safeguards against fraudulent practices in the sale of land. The Radiation Safety Act of 1968 provided standards and recalls for defective electronic products.

=== Environment ===
Joseph A. Califano Jr. has suggested that the Great Society's main contribution to the environment was an extension of protections beyond those aimed at the conservation of untouched resources. In a message he transmitted to Congress, President Johnson said:

The air we breathe, our water, our soil and wildlife, are being blighted by poisons and chemicals which are the by-products of technology and industry. The society that receives the rewards of technology, must, as a cooperating whole, take responsibility for [their] control. To deal with these new problems will require a new conservation. We must not only protect the countryside and save it from destruction, we must restore what has been destroyed and salvage the beauty and charm of our cities. Our conservation must be not just the classic conservation of protection [against] development, but a creative conservation of restoration and innovation.

— Special Message to the Congress on Conservation and Restoration of Natural Beauty; February 8, 1965

At the behest of Secretary of the Interior Stewart Udall, the Great Society included several new environmental laws to protect air and water. Environmental legislation enacted included:

- Water Quality Act of 1965
- Clean Air Act of 1963
- Wilderness Act of 1964
- Endangered Species Preservation Act of 1966
- National Trails System Act of 1968
- Wild and Scenic Rivers Act of 1968
- Land and Water Conservation Fund Act of 1965
- Solid Waste Disposal Act of 1965
- Motor Vehicle Air Pollution Control Act of 1965
- National Historic Preservation Act of 1966

=== Housing ===
Under the Economic Opportunity Act of 1964 loans were authorized "to low income farm families for small farm improvements and nonfarm enterprises that would add to family income". That same year a Housing Act was introduced which improved the quality of the housing program by requiring minimum standards of code enforcement, providing assistance to dislocated families and small businesses and authorizing below market interest loans for rehabilitating housing in urban renewal areas. In 1965, the rural housing program was converted to one largely funded on an insured-loan basis, which opened the way "for a great increase in volume of the program and expanded the loan program for rural waste systems to a loan and grant program for water and waste disposal systems, raising the maximum population of rural towns served to 5,500 and maximum financing per project to $4 million. In addition, the annual ceiling on insured loans for community facilities and farm ownership was increased from $200 million to $450 million. New housing legislation in 1966 removed a 62-year age minimum "on tenants of low income rural rent housing financed through the agency, and on borrowers obtaining individual housing loans on the basis of cosigners. It also authorized FmHa to finance purchase of newly-constructed homes".

The Housing and Urban Development Act of 1965 included important elements such as rent subsidies for low-income families, rehabilitation grants to enable low-income homeowners in urban renewal areas to improve their homes instead of relocating elsewhere, and improved and extended benefits for relocation payments. The Demonstration Cities Act of 1966 established a new program for comprehensive neighborhood renewal, with an emphasis on strategic investments in housing renovation, urban services, neighborhood facilities, and job creation activities. The Disaster Relief Act of 1966 authorized HUD, as noted by one study, “to refinance loans when necessary because of the loss, destruction or damage to property securing the loans as the result of a major disaster”.

=== Rural development ===
A number of measures were introduced to improve socio-economic conditions in rural areas. Under Title III of the 1964 Economic Opportunity Act, Special Programs to Combat Rural Poverty, the Office for Economic Opportunity was authorized to act as a lender of last resort for rural families who needed money to help them permanently increase their earning capacity. Loans could be made to purchase land, improve the operation of family farms, allow participation in cooperative ventures, and finance non-agricultural business enterprises, while local cooperatives which served low-income rural families could apply for another category of loans for similar purposes.

Title III also made loans and grants available to local groups to improve housing, education, and child care services for migrant farm workers, while Titles I and II also included potentially important programs for rural development. Title I established the Job Corps which enrolled school dropouts in community service projects: 40% of the corpsmen were to work in a Youth Conservation Corps to carry out resource conservation, beautification, and development projects in the National Forests and countryside. Arguably more important for rural areas were the Community Action Programs authorized by Title II. Federal money was allocated to States according to their needs for job training, housing, health, and welfare assistance, and the States were then to distribute their shares of the Community Action grants on the basis of proposals from local public or non-profit private groups.

The Public Works and Economic Development Act of 1965 reorganized the Areas Redevelopment Administration (ARA) into the Economic Development Administration (EDA), and authorized $3.3 billion over 5 years while specifying seven criteria for eligibility. The list included low median family income, but the 6% or higher unemployment applied to the greatest number of areas, while the Act also mentioned outmigration from rural areas as a criterion. In an attempt to go beyond what one writer described as "ARA's failed scattershot approach" of providing aid to individual counties and inspired by the European model of regional development, the EDA encouraged counties to form Economic Development Districts (EDDs) as it was recognized that individual distressed counties (called RAs or Redevelopment Areas) lacked sufficient resources for their own development.

EDDs encompassed from 5 to 15 counties and both planned and implemented development with EDA funding and technical assistance, and each EDD had a "growth center" (another concept borrowed from Europe) called a redevelopment center if it was located in an RA or development center if in another county. With the exception of the growth centers, EDD counties were ineligible for assistance unless they were RAs, but they were all expected to benefit from "coordinated districtwide development planning".

=== Labor ===
A number of measures concerning labor were also introduced during Johnson's presidency. Amendments made to the 1931 Davis-Bacon Act in 1964 extended the prevailing wage provisions to cover fringe benefits, while the Farm Labor Contractor Registration Act of 1963, which was enacted in September 1964, sought to improve conditions for interstate migrant farmworkers.

The Service Contract Act of 1965 provided for minimum wages and fringe benefits as well as other conditions of work for contractors under certain types of service contracts. The Federal Coal Mine Safety Act Amendments of 1966 extended the provisions of a previous federal Act related to coal mine safety to those mines (as noted by one study) “regularly employing less than 15 persons underground”, while the Federal Metal and Nonmetallic Mine Safety Act of 1966 established procedures (as noted by one study) “for developing safety and health standards for metal and nonmetal mines”. Various improvements in the pay and benefits of federal employees were also introduced, and a comprehensive minimum rate hike was signed into law that extended the coverage of the Fair Labor Standards Act to about 9.1 million additional workers.

In 1965, the House of Representatives approved by 221 to 203 votes a measure aimed at repealing the section of the Taft-Hartley Act that authorized right-to-work laws. The measure, however, failed to pass as a result of a Senate filibuster.

== Conservative opposition ==
In the 1966 midterm elections, the Republicans made major gains in part through a challenge to the War on Poverty. Large-scale civic unrest in the inner-city was escalating (reaching a climax in 1968), strengthening demand for law and order. Urban white ethnics who had been an important part of the New Deal Coalition felt abandoned by the Democratic Party's concentration on racial minorities. Republican candidates ignored more popular programs, such as Medicare or the Elementary and Secondary Education Act, and focused their attacks on less popular programs. Furthermore, Republicans made an effort to avoid the stigma of negativism and elitism that had dogged them since the days of the New Deal, and instead proposed well-crafted alternatives—such as their "Opportunity Crusade". The result was a major gain of 47 House seats for the GOP in the 1966 United States House of Representatives elections that put the conservative coalition of Republicans and Southern Democrats back in business.

Despite conservatives who attacked Johnson's Great Society making major gains in Congress in the 1966 midterm elections, and with anger and frustration mounting over the Vietnam War, Johnson was still able to secure the passage of additional programs during his last two years in office. Laws were passed to extend the Food Stamp Program, to expand consumer protection, to improve safety standards, to train health professionals, to assist handicapped Americans, and to further urban programs.

Conservative economist Thomas Sowell has criticized Johnson's Great Society policies and blamed them for having the opposite desired effect. He pointed to strikingly higher rates of single motherhood and lower outcomes in Black children across the board.

== Legacy ==
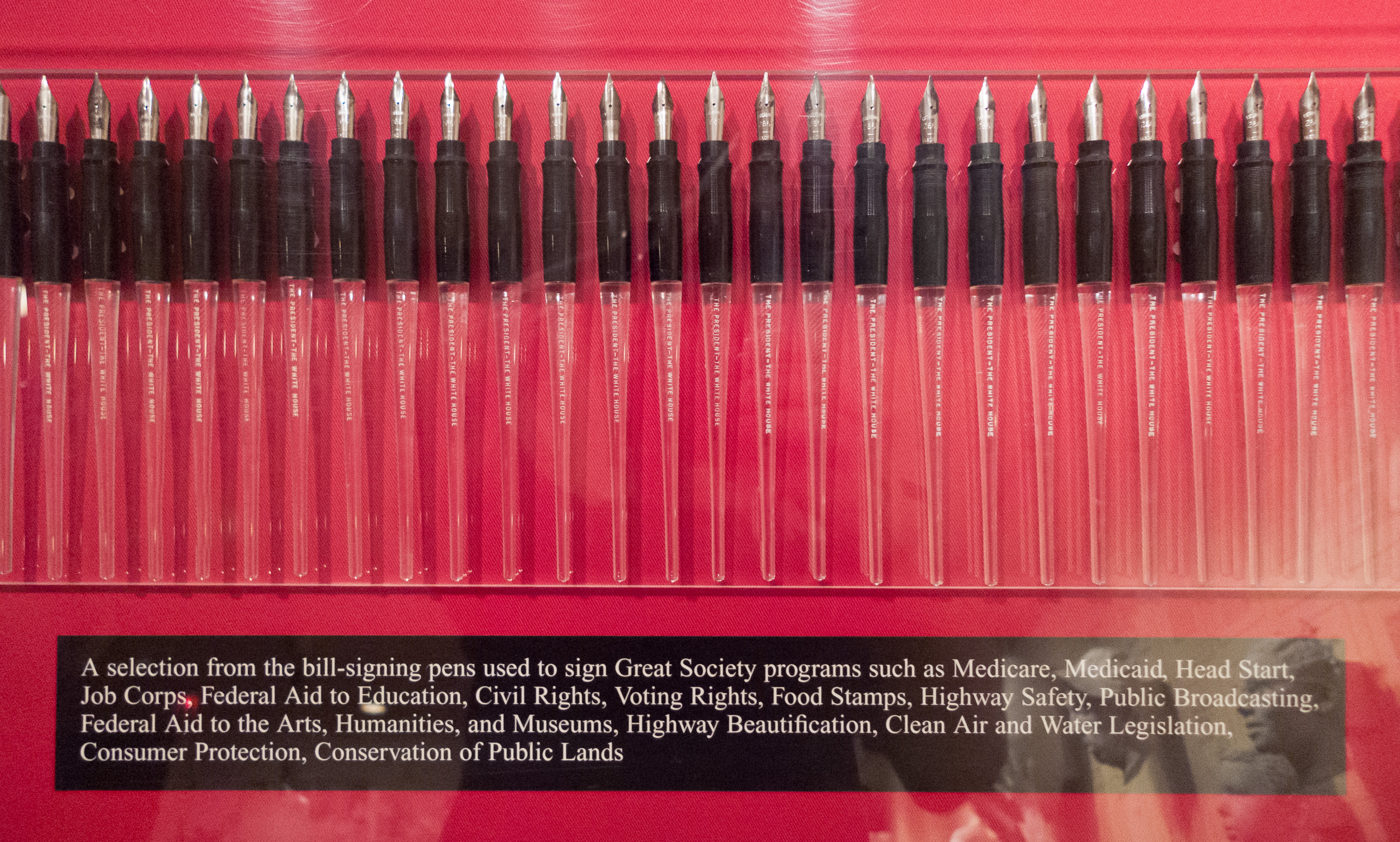
The pens used by President Lyndon B. Johnson to sign Great Society legislation

Interpretations of the War on Poverty remain controversial with multiple studies evaluating poverty statistics done over time. Between 1959 and 1967, analysis by the U.S. Department of Commerce found that among families headed by men, both white families and families of African American and other non-white ethnicities experienced a particularly sharp decline in poverty, approximately 50 percent. However, no decrease was observed in the number of poor families headed by African American or other non-white women. The percentage of African Americans below the poverty line experienced the biggest percentage drop as a share of population from 55 percent in 1960 to 27 percent in 1968. By 1968, the federal government was spending approximately $4,000 per annum on average for each poor family of four, four times as much as in 1961. This was due to an increase of spending which now included Medicaid, Head Start, Job Corps, Model Cities, Food Stamps Community Action Programs, housing aid, urban development, and more. These costs partially overlapped with overall cost increases for education and healthcare. From 1964 to 1967, federal expenditures on education rose from $4 billion to $12 billion, while spending on health rose from $5 billion to $16 billion. One of Johnson's aides, Joseph A. Califano Jr., summarized that "from 1963 when Lyndon Johnson took office until 1970 as the impact of his Great Society programs were felt, the portion of Americans living below the poverty line dropped from 22.2 percent to 12.6 percent, the most dramatic decline over such a brief period in this century."

Historian Alan Brinkley did not view the declines in poverty to be meaningful enough, stating that "the gap between the expansive intentions of the war on poverty and its relatively modest achievements fueled later conservative arguments that government is not an appropriate vehicle for solving social problems."

In the 1970s the Office of Economic Opportunity was dismantled by the Nixon and Ford administrations, largely by transferring poverty programs to other government departments. Funding for many of these programs was further cut in President Ronald Reagan's Gramm-Latta Budget in 1981.

Statistical analysis shows that the Official Poverty Rate fell from 19.5 percent in 1963 to 12.3 percent in 2017. However, using a broader definition that includes cash income, taxes, and major in-kind transfers and inflation rates, the "Full-income Poverty Rate" based on President Johnson's standards fell from 19.5 percent to 2.3 percent over that period.

Philippine president and dictator Ferdinand Marcos was inspired by the Great Society in instituting his own national program called the "Bagong Lipunan" (lit. 'New Society'), which he began after declaring martial law over the Philippines in 1972; a political party called the Kilusang Bagong Lipunan (lit. 'new society movement') was later established by Marcos in 1978.

== See also ==
- Social policy
- Health policy
- Education policy
- Domestic policy
- Big society
- Presidency of Lyndon B. Johnson
- Interest group liberalism
- Modern liberalism in the United States
- Social programs in the United States
- Social safety net
