= Athletics at the 1983 Summer Universiade – Men's 200 metres =

The men's 200 metres event at the 1983 Summer Universiade was held at the Commonwealth Stadium in Edmonton, Canada on 8, 9 and 10 July 1983.

== Medalists ==
Gold	Silver	Bronze
Innocent Egbunike; Nigeria	Elliott Quow; United States	Bernie Jackson; United States

== Results ==
=== Heats ===
Held on 8 July

Wind:
Heat 1: ? m/s, Heat 2: +1.0 m/s, Heat 3: ? m/s, Heat 4: +3.0 m/s, Heat 5: ? m/s

Rank	Heat	Athlete	Nationality	Time	Notes
1	4	Bernie Jackson	United States	20.52	Q
2	2	Jean-Jacques Boussemart	France	20.87	Q
3	4	Tony Sharpe	Canada	20.90	Q
4	4	Boubacar Diallo	Senegal	20.94	Q
5	3	Vladimir Muravyov	Soviet Union	21.04	Q
6	3	Innocent Egbunike	Nigeria	21.06	Q
7	1	Elliott Quow	United States	21.14	Q
8	3	Jang Jae-keun	South Korea	21.20	Q
9	3	Fritz Werner-Heer	West Germany	21.21	Q
10	4	Juan Prado	Spain	21.25	Q
10	4	Koichi Mishiba	Japan	21.25	q
12	1	Roland Jokl	Austria	21.30	Q
13	2	Emilio Moltrasio	Italy	21.36	Q
13	5	Luis Alberto Schneider	Chile	21.36	Q
15	2	Paulo Roberto Correia	Brazil	21.46	Q
16	4	Harouna Pale	Upper Volta	21.50	q
17	1	Álvarez Sánchez	Spain	21.52	Q
18	2	Desai Williams	Canada	21.55	Q
19	3	Mohamed Purnomo	Indonesia	21.61	q
20	5	Aleksandr Zolotaryev	Soviet Union	21.62	Q
21	1	Thomas Geuyen	West Germany	21.63	Q
22	3	Oddur Sigurðsson	Iceland	21.65	q
23	5	Giovanni Bongiorni	Italy	21.75	Q
24	2	Kenji Yamauchi	Japan	21.94	
25	4	Rubén Inácio	Angola	22.07	
26	3	Clifford Mamba	Swaziland	22.22	
27	5	Arnaldo Abrantes	Portugal	22.30	Q
28	5	Alan Zammit	Malta	22.63	
29	1	Julius Afar	Indonesia	22.69	
30	3	Jihad Salame	Lebanon	22.90	
31	1	José Rodolfo Asturias	Guatemala	23.41	
	2	Armenio Gaspar	Angola	DQ	

=== Quarterfinals ===
Held on 9 July

Wind:
Heat 1: +0.5 m/s, Heat 2: +1.5 m/s, Heat 3: +0.7 m/s

Rank	Heat	Athlete	Nationality	Time	Notes
1	1	Bernie Jackson	United States	20.69	Q
2	3	Elliott Quow	United States	20.75	Q
3	3	Jean-Jacques Boussemart	France	20.81	Q
4	1	Innocent Egbunike	Nigeria	20.82	Q
4	2	Boubacar Diallo	Senegal	20.82	Q
6	1	Luis Alberto Schneider	Chile	20.85	Q
7	2	Fritz Werner-Heer	West Germany	20.89	Q
8	1	Desai Williams	Canada	20.95	Q
9	2	Tony Sharpe	Canada	20.97	Q
10	1	Jang Jae-keun	South Korea	21.00	q
11	1	Roland Jokl	Austria	21.00	q
12	3	Vladimir Muravyov	Soviet Union	21.02	Q
13	2	Aleksandr Zolotaryev	Soviet Union	21.07	Q
14	2	Paulo Roberto Correia	Brazil	21.10	q
15	2	Giovanni Bongiorni	Italy	21.20	q
16	3	Álvarez Sánchez	Spain	21.22	Q
17	3	Koichi Mishiba	Japan	21.25	
18	3	Emilio Moltrasio	Italy	21.39	
19	2	Juan Prado	Spain	21.40	
20	2	Harouna Pale	Upper Volta	21.43	
21	1	Mohamed Purnomo	Indonesia	21.51	
22	3	Oddur Sigurðsson	Iceland	21.64	
	?	Thomas Geuyen	West Germany	??.??	
	?	Arnaldo Abrantes	Portugal	DNS	

=== Semifinals ===
Held on 10 July

Wind:
Heat 1: +0.1 m/s, Heat 2: -0.5 m/s

Rank	Heat	Athlete	Nationality	Time	Notes
1	1	Innocent Egbunike	Nigeria	20.53	Q
2	1	Bernie Jackson	United States	20.58	Q
3	1	Vladimir Muravyov	Soviet Union	20.61	Q
4	1	Boubacar Diallo	Senegal	20.72	q
5	2	Jean-Jacques Boussemart	France	20.73	Q
6	2	Elliott Quow	United States	20.78	Q
7	1	Luis Alberto Schneider	Chile	20.80	q, PB
8	1	Tony Sharpe	Canada	20.81	
9	2	Desai Williams	Canada	20.84	Q
10	2	Jang Jae-keun	South Korea	20.93	
11	2	Fritz Werner-Heer	West Germany	20.95	
12	2	Roland Jokl	Austria	21.02	
13	2	Aleksandr Zolotaryev	Soviet Union	21.13	
14	1	Álvarez Sánchez	Spain	21.22	
15	1	Paulo Roberto Correia	Brazil	21.25	
16	2	Giovanni Bongiorni	Italy	21.46	

=== Final ===
Held on 10 July

Wind: +0.6 m/s

Rank	Athlete	Nationality	Time	Notes
1st place, gold medalist(s)	Innocent Egbunike	Nigeria	20.42	
2nd place, silver medalist(s)	Elliott Quow	United States	20.46	
3rd place, bronze medalist(s)	Bernie Jackson	United States	20.57	
4	Vladimir Muravyov	Soviet Union	20.66	
5	Jean-Jacques Boussemart	France	20.70	
6	Desai Williams	Canada	20.80	
7	Boubacar Diallo	Senegal	20.92	
8	Luis Alberto Schneider	Chile	20.95	
