= Ryan report =

Ryan report, or Ryan Report, is usually a name for a government document with a principal contributor named "Ryan". Due to the prevalence of "Ryan" as both a surname and a given name, several documents are known by this name, either formally or colloquially.

Government documents

- The War on Poverty: 50 Years Later (2014), a report published by the Budget Committee of the US House of Representatives, sometimes referred to as the "Ryan report", or "Ryan's report", due to committee chair Paul Ryan
- The report of the Irish government's Commission to Inquire into Child Abuse (2009), commonly referred to as the "Ryan report" due to commission chair Sean Ryan (judge)
- Klaus Barbie and the United States Government: A Report to the Attorney General (1983), a report documenting the involvement of US government agencies in assisting former Nazis to evade prosecution for war crimes committed during World War II, commonly referred to as the "Ryan report" due to its author Allan Ryan (attorney)

Other uses

- The Ryan Report, a segment of The Ryan Cameron Morning Show broadcast by radio station WVEE (V-103) in Atlanta, Georgia
- The Ryan Report, a web blog published by US television network ABC presumably written by Detective Kevin Ryan, a fictional character in the Castle TV series
