= Athletics at the 1983 Pan American Games – Men's 200 metres =

Men's 200 metres at the Pan American Games

The men's 200 metres event at the 1983 Pan American Games was held in Caracas, Venezuela on 25 and 26 August.

== Medalists ==
Gold	Silver	Bronze
Elliott Quow; United States	Leandro Peñalver; Cuba	Bernie Jackson; United States

== Results ==
=== Heats ===
Wind:
Heat 1: -0.3 m/s, Heat 2: -2.5 m/s

Rank	Heat	Name	Nationality	Time	Notes
1	1	João Batista da Silva	Brazil	20.66	Q
2	1	Leandro Peñalver	Cuba	20.74	Q
3	2	Bernie Jackson	United States	20.86	Q
4	2	Tomás González	Cuba	20.88	Q
5	1	Elliott Quow	United States	20.90	Q
~~6~~	2	Juan Núñez	Dominican Republic	~~20.91~~	DQ
6	2	Tony Sharpe	Canada	21.04	Q
7	1	Andrew Bruce	Trinidad and Tobago	21.05	q
8	2	Robson da Silva	Brazil	21.07	
9	1	George Walcott	Jamaica	21.13	
10	1	Luis Schneider	Chile	21.28	
11	2	Christopher Brathwaite	Trinidad and Tobago	21.31	
12	2	Alberto Lugo	Venezuela	21.31	
13	1	Hipólito Brown	Venezuela	21.34	
14	2	Everard Samuels	Jamaica	21.42	
15	1	Neville Hodge	United States Virgin Islands	21.57	

=== Final ===
Wind: -1.3 m/s

Rank	Name	Nationality	Time	Notes
1st place, gold medalist(s)	Elliott Quow	United States	20.42	
2nd place, silver medalist(s)	Leandro Peñalver	Cuba	20.53	
3rd place, bronze medalist(s)	Bernie Jackson	United States	20.81	
4	Tomás González	Cuba	20.85	
~~5~~	Juan Núñez	Dominican Republic	~~21.06~~	DQ
5	João Batista da Silva	Brazil	21.12	
6	Tony Sharpe	Canada	21.20	
7	Andrew Bruce	Trinidad and Tobago	21.29	
