= Luis Alberto Schneider =

Personal information
- Full name: Luis Alberto Schneider Zuanich
- Born: 25 November 1959 (age 66) Temuco, Chile
- Height: 1.88 m (6 ft 2 in)
- Weight: 72 kg (159 lb)

Sport
- Sport: Athletics
- Events: 100 metres, 200 metres
Medal record
Representing Chile
Southern Cross Games
Gold medal – first place	1978 La Paz	100m
Gold medal – first place	1978 La Paz	200m
Gold medal – first place	1978 La Paz	4x100m relay
Gold medal – first place	1978 La Paz	4x400m relay
Gold medal – first place	1982 Santa Fe	100m
Gold medal – first place	1982 Santa Fe	200m
Gold medal – first place	1982 Santa Fe	4x100m relay
Gold medal – first place	1982 Santa Fe	4x400m relay
Silver medal – second place	1986 Santiago	4x100m relay

Luis Alberto Schneider Zuanich (born 25 November 1959) is a retired Chilean sprinter. He represented his country in the 200 metres at the 1983 World Championships reaching the second round. He was particularly successful at the Southern Cross Games (later South American Games), where he won 9 medals, 8 of which were gold.

== International competitions ==
Year	Competition	Venue	Position	Event	Notes
Representing Chile
1977	South American Championships	Montevideo, Uruguay	6th	100 m	11.0
1977	South American Championships	Montevideo, Uruguay	7th	Long jump	6.77 m
1978	Southern Cross Games	La Paz, Bolivia	1st	100 m	10.70
1978	Southern Cross Games	La Paz, Bolivia	1st	200 m	21.4
1978	Southern Cross Games	La Paz, Bolivia	1st	4 × 100 m relay	40.35
1978	Southern Cross Games	La Paz, Bolivia	1st	4 × 400 m relay	3:18.48
1979	Pan American Games	San Juan, Puerto Rico	22nd (h)	100 m	10.96
1979	Pan American Games	San Juan, Puerto Rico	17th (h)	200 m	21.85
1979	South American Championships	Bucaramanga, Colombia	7th	100 m	10.8
1979	South American Championships	Bucaramanga, Colombia	4th	200 m	21.1
1979	South American Championships	Bucaramanga, Colombia	4th	4 × 100 m relay	41.3
1981	South American Championships	La Paz, Bolivia	3rd	100 m	10.3
1981	South American Championships	La Paz, Bolivia	3rd	200 m	20.5
1981	South American Championships	La Paz, Bolivia	2nd	4 × 100 m relay	40.4
1982	Southern Cross Games	Santa Fe, Argentina	1st	100 m	10.87
1982	Southern Cross Games	Santa Fe, Argentina	1st	200 m	21.28
1982	Southern Cross Games	Santa Fe, Argentina	1st	4 × 100 m relay	41.00
1982	Southern Cross Games	Santa Fe, Argentina	1st	4 × 400 m relay	3:11.65
1983	Universiade	Edmonton, Canada	11th (sf)	100 m	10.52
1983	Universiade	Edmonton, Canada	8th	200 m	20.95
1983	World Championships	Helsinki, Finland	26th (qf)	200 m	21.39 (w)
1983	Pan American Games	Caracas, Venezuela	15th (sf)	100 m	10.75
1983	Pan American Games	Caracas, Venezuela	10th (h)	200 m	21.28
1983	South American Championships	Santa Fe, Argentina	4th	100 m	10.7
1983	South American Championships	Santa Fe, Argentina	4th	200 m	21.8
1983	South American Championships	Santa Fe, Argentina	4th	4 × 100 m relay	42.0
1983	South American Championships	Santa Fe, Argentina	2nd	4 × 400 m relay	3:13.6
1985	South American Championships	Santiago, Chile	10th (h)	100 m	11.01
1986	South American Games	Santiago, Chile	5th	100 m	10.85
1986	South American Games	Santiago, Chile	2nd	4 × 100 m relay	40.83

== Personal bests ==
Outdoor

- 100 metres – 10.34 (0.0 m/s, Ciudad Bolívar 1981)
- 200 metres – 20.80 (+0.1 m/s, Edmonton 1983)
