= Community Action Agencies =

Organizations that locally carry out the United States Community Action Program

In the United States and its territories, Community Action Agencies (CAA) are local private and public non-profit organizations that carry out the Community Action Program (CAP), which was founded by the 1964 Economic Opportunity Act to fight poverty by empowering the poor as part of the War on Poverty.

CAAs are intended to promote self-sufficiency, and they depend heavily on volunteer work, especially from the low-income community. The Community Services Block Grant (CSBG) is the agencies' core federal funding. Agencies also operate a variety of grants that come from federal, state and local sources. These grants vary widely among agencies, although most CAAs operate Head Start programs, which focus on early child development. Other programs frequently administered by Community Action Agencies include Low-Income Home Energy Assistance (LIHEAP) utility grants and Weatherization Assistance Program (WAP) funded through the U.S. Department of Energy (DOE).

Each CAA is governed by a board of directors consisting of at least one-third low-income community members, one-third public officials, and up to one-third private sector leaders. This board structure is defined by federal statute and is known as a tripartite board.

There are currently over 1,000 CAAs, engaged in a broad range of activities; typical activities include promoting citizen participation, providing utility bill assistance and home weatherization for low-income individuals, administration of Head Start pre-school programs, job training, operating food pantries, and coordinating community initiatives.

== History ==
In 1964, the U.S. poverty rate (income-based) included 19 percent of Americans. Rising political forces demanded change. Under a new White House Office of Economic Opportunity (OEO), the concept of the federally-funded, local Community Action Program (CAP)—delivered by a local Community Action Agency (CAA), in a nationwide Community Action Network—would become the primary vehicle for a new, federal War on Poverty.

=== Establishment ===
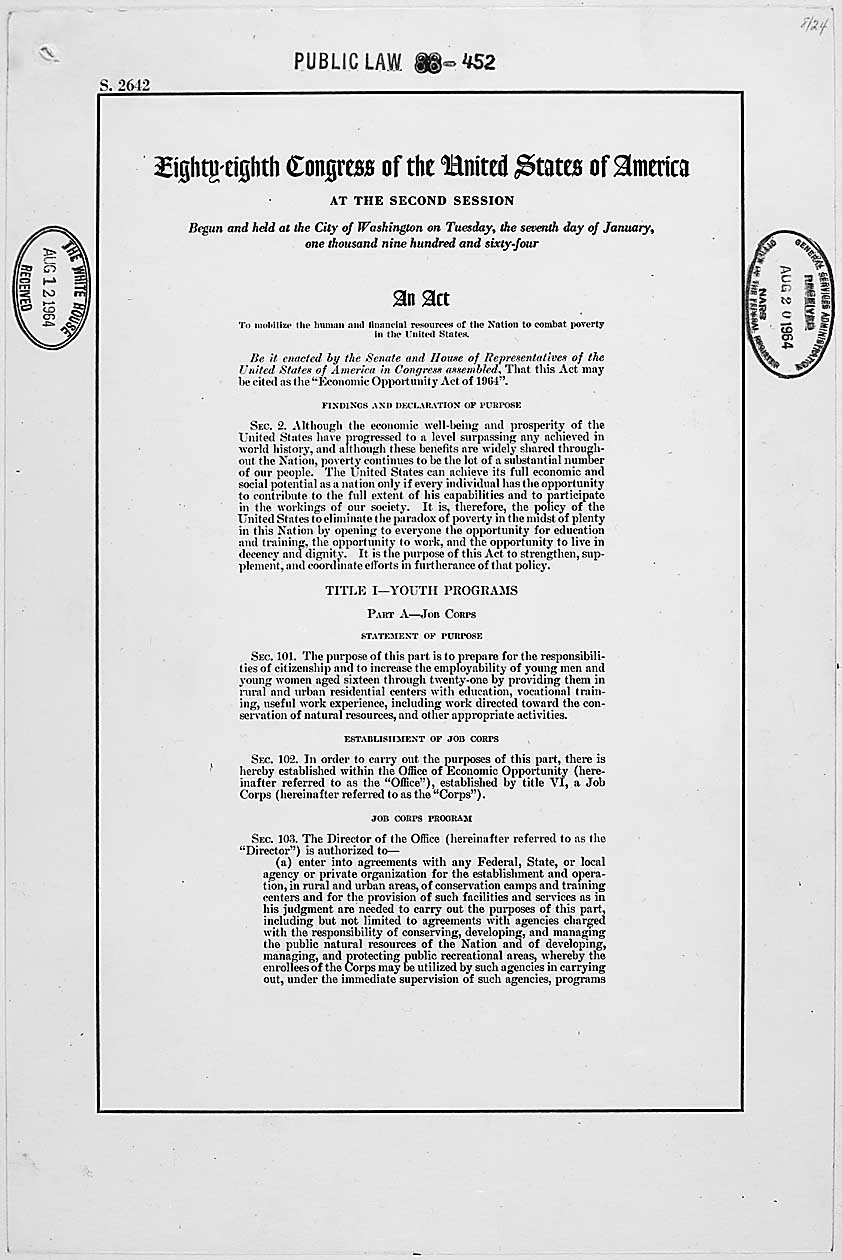
Economic Opportunity Act of 1964

Lyndon B. Johnson's landmark Economic Opportunity Act of 1964—drafted by former Peace Corps founding director Sargent Shriver—established Community Action Programs in Title II. In concept, a Community Action Program was defined as a program "...which provides services, assistance, and other activities of sufficient scope and size to give promise of progress toward elimination of poverty or a cause or causes of poverty through developing employment opportunities, improving human performance, motivation, and productivity, or bettering the conditions under which people live, learn, and work."

A controversial feature of the Act was the requirement for "maximum feasible participation" of the people directly affected (the poor, basically) in the decision-making about how federal funds would be spent on them, in their community. This flew in the face of long-established power structures, where elected city councils, county commissions, state and federal officials ruled over everything—mostly people from the power elite and upper-class communities. The notion that the poor (largely minorities) should have a say in their affairs created some opposition at first, but was in keeping with America's civil rights and reform movements, and war on poverty, in the 1960s and 1970s, and generally accepted, at least at first.

In each community, the local Community Action Program (CAP) was provided by a local non-profit Community Action Agency (CAA), overseen by a board made up—initially—of residents of the target neighborhood or population being served. This gave poor, working class and minority citizens a voice in how they would be served by federal funds aimed at improving their lives. However, this caused some anger and frustration among the nation's power establishment, especially in local governments used to running their communities, and among the power elites (particularly in the business community) used to dominating their local governments.

=== Problems, pushback, pullback, and successes ===
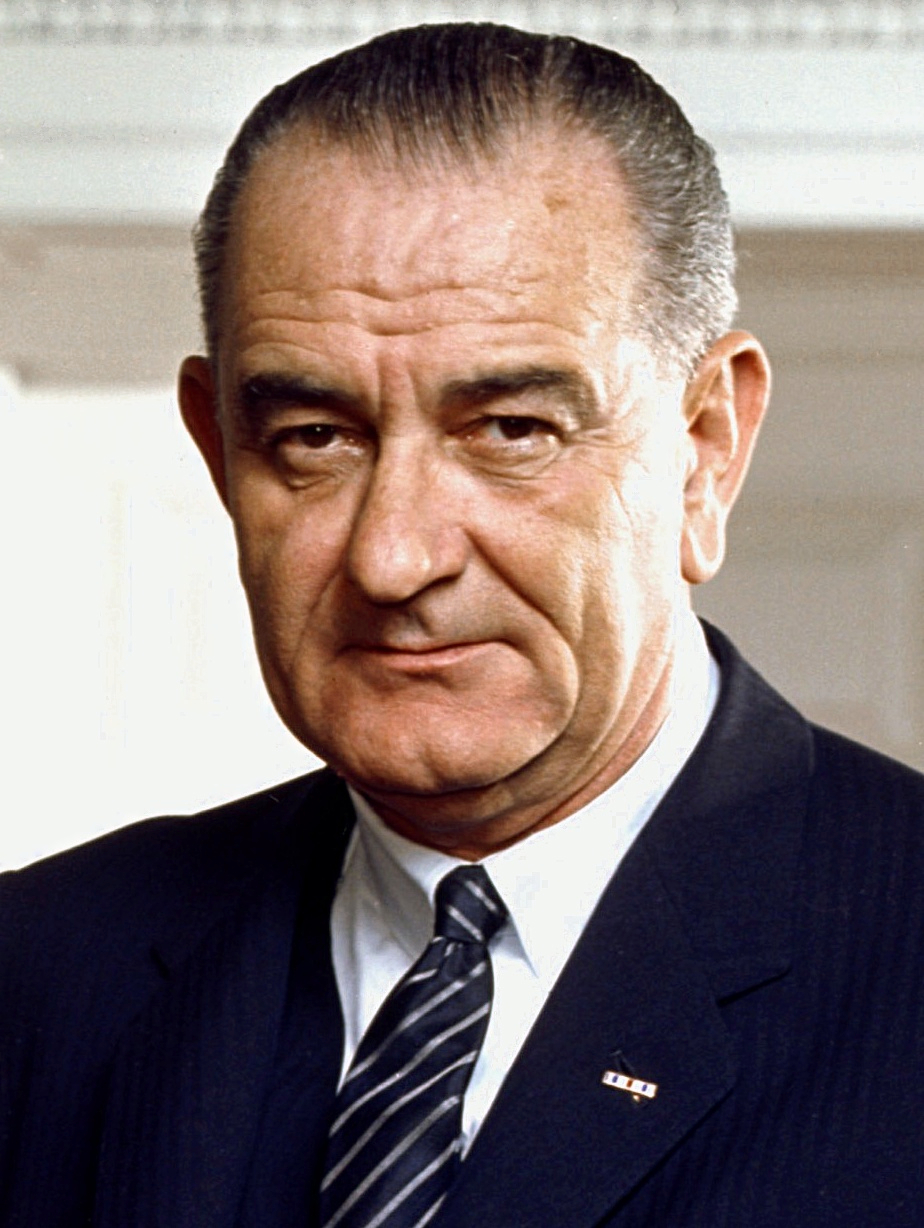
Lyndon Johnson

Although Johnson and other architects of the legislation expected Community Action Programs and Agencies to be an effective weapon in his War on Poverty, many of them were riddled with problems. In more extreme instances, local political regimes were threatened by the empowerment of poor political activists with funding and resources from the federal government.

One of the most dramatic episodes resulting from these clashes between CAA leaders and local governments occurred when, following cuts in funding for a summer youth CAP, black activist Charles Sizemore and thirty others barged into San Francisco Mayor John Shelley's office demanding resources and threatening that if the CAP was not funded once again, "this goddamn town's gonna blow."

By the mid/late-1960s, many political leaders—including President Johnson, U.S. Senator Richard Russell (D-GA) (leader of the anti-civil rights conservative coalition), and Chicago's powerful Mayor Richard J. Daley—publicly or privately expressed displeasure with the power-sharing that the CAA brought to poor and minority neighborhoods.

In 1967, conservative and establishment pressures brought two amendments to the Congressional funding bill for the OEO (Office of Economic Opportunity—overseer of the CAA/CAP programs):

- The Green Amendment gave city governments the right to decide which entity would be the official CAA for their community.
- The Quie Amendment gave two-thirds of the seats on CAA boards to elected city officials and "private sector representatives" (businesspeople), effectively outnumbering neighborhood citizens on their own CAA boards.

The net result was a halt to the citizen participation reform movement and a fundamental shift of power away from the nation's poor and minorities.

Nevertheless, some federal emphasis on anti-poverty programs remained, including the (modified) CAP/CAA system. By 1973, the U.S. poverty rate dropped to 11.1 percent, a 7.9 percent decrease in 10 years, and the lowest it would be between 1959 and 2004. One of the ways in which the CAAs were clearly effective in combatting poverty––and unexpectedly so––was by increasing the public's awareness of already existing welfare programs, such as Aid to Families with Dependent Children. Indeed, between 1960 and 1973, and especially in the years following the passage of the Economic Opportunity Act of 1964, spending on the AFDC quadrupled as the number of individuals who enrolled in the program rose sharply.

=== Conservative backlash and Relf v. Weinberger ===
During the conservative-backlash era of the late 1970s, 1980s and 1990s as the federal government (under Presidents Jimmy Carter, Ronald Reagan, George H. W. Bush, Bill Clinton, and George W. Bush) cut away programs for the poor and minorities, the CAPs and CAAs were defunded, underfunded, or warped into a strange variation of their original intent, with far less influence of the poor and minorities in how they would be served by these entities.

Nixon officials presided over CAP and CAA groups during the Relf v. Weinberger case which saw a pair of young black girls from Montgomery, Alabama surgically sterilized without their consent. The Relf case's revealed administrative attitudes of the era which suggest that forced sterilization was an acceptable tactic in Republican management of federal welfare.

The troubled economy of the mid-to-late 1970s, brought on by the energy crisis and the Early 1980s recession was especially hard on America's poor. Between 1973 and 1983, the national poverty rate rose from 11.1% to 15.2%. Another decade later, in 1993, the poverty rate was virtually unchanged at 15.1%, just a 0.1% decrease from 1983.

Between 1993 and 2004, the U.S. poverty rate first declined (from 15.1% in 1993, to 11.3% in 2000), but then increased to 12.7% by 2004. The 2008 poverty rate was 13.2%. The 2022 metric is 12.6%.

=== Today ===
However, despite these challenges, around 1,000 CAPs (and their CAAs) still operate today, across the United States.

== See also ==
- Community Action Services and Food Bank
