= Office of Economic Opportunity =

Defunct agency responsible for administering most of the War on Poverty programs

The Office of Economic Opportunity (OEO) was the agency responsible for administering most of the War on Poverty programs created as part of United States president Lyndon B. Johnson's Great Society legislative agenda. It was established in 1964 as an independent agency and renamed the Community Services Administration (CSA) in 1974.

The Richard Nixon administration attempted to dismantle the agency in 1973. However, this effort was not wholly successful. It would ultimately then be dismantled in 1981 by the Ronald Reagan administration, as it was moved into the Department of Health and Human Services and renamed the Office of Community Services, with most of its programs continuing to operate.

== History ==
=== Independent agency ===
The Office of Economic Opportunity was created through the efforts of President Lyndon Johnson in his War on Poverty campaign, which aimed to tackle economic and racial inequality. In 1964, Johnson signed the Economic Opportunity Act, which was the legislative keystone that provided funding for the OEO as a new agency within the Office of the President. R. Sargent Shriver served as its first director. The Office administered antipoverty programs such as VISTA, Job Corps, Community Action Program, and Head Start, and it quickly became a target of both left-wing and right-wing critics of the war on poverty legislation.

President Richard Nixon's appointment of Howard Phillips as Acting Director of OEO in January 1973 touched off a national controversy culminating in a court case in the United States District Court for the District of Columbia (Williams v. Phillips, 482 F.2d 669) challenging the legality of Phillips' appointment. The Court found Phillips's appointment illegal because it failed to meet the statutory circumstances enabling the appointment of an interim director without Senate confirmation, as required by the U.S. Constitution. This judgment was upheld on appeal.

President Nixon's attempt to impound appropriated funds for OEO was ruled unconstitutional by Judge William B. Jones on April 11, 1973, in a case brought by Local 2677, AFGE; West Central Missouri Rural Dev. Corp.; and the National Council of OEO Locals.

With the passage of the Community Service Act (CSA) in 1975, Congressional reauthorization replaced the OEO with the Community Services Administration (CSA). The new agency retained its independent status as a smaller operating agency.

=== Department of Health and Human Services ===
President Ronald Reagan took office in 1981 with campaign promises to shrink social programs and return power to the states. Reagan acted on these promises by signing the Omnibus Reconciliation Act (OBRA) of 1981, legislation that significantly reduced the federal deficit and funding to antipoverty agencies. On September 30, 1981, OBRA transferred functions via the Community Services Block Grant to the states and a small staff in the Office of Community Services in the Department of Health and Human Services (HHS) in Washington, D.C., abolishing the regional offices and approximately 1000 jobs. Although CSA was dismantled, most of the agency's programs continued to be operated either by HHS or by other federal agencies.

In 1986, the Office of Community Service was housed within the HHS Family Support Administration. In 1991, the Administration for Children and Families (ACF) was created by merging two HHS agencies: the Office of Human Development Services and the Family Support Administration. With this union, the Office of Community Services became one of ACF's programs.

== Impact on Native Americans ==
Native Americans in the United States participated in programs initiated by the Office of Economic Opportunity after its establishment in 1964. That year, OEO Director R. Sargent Shriver contacted Dr. James Wilson to oversee a department focused on poverty in Native American Communities. Wilson accepted the role and worked on efforts aimed at increasing political representation and access to federal resources for Native American tribes. These efforts contributed to policies that allowed tribes to receive direct federal funding for community initiatives. The community action program (CAP) was a core component of the OEO, intended to coordinate local resources to address poverty. The OEO worked with the National Congress of American Indians to develop CAPs, although this collaboration sometimes conflicted with the Bureau of Indian Affairs. Tribal CAPs directed funding toward programs such as Head Start, home-improvement initiatives, education, legal services, health centers, and economic-development projects.

In Navajo communities, one development associated with the OEO initiative was the establishment of the Rough Rock Demonstration School. The school incorporated Navajo cultural elements within its curriculum while preparing students for broader societal contexts. Managed by the Navajo Nation, it became the first school fully controlled by a Native American tribe since the federal government assumed authority over the schools of the Five Civilized Tribes in the late 19th century. Rough Rock's creation was followed by the establishment of Navajo Community College (now Diné College) which is regarded as the first modern tribal college. Similar initiatives later contributed to the expansion of tribal colleges and universities across the United States.

Although the Office of Economic Opportunity was abolished in 1981, many of its programs continued under other federal agencies. Its programs still exist, although in modified form, among other federal agencies, particularly the Department of Health and Human Services. Some states have established offices inspired by the OEO model to address poverty, promote self-sufficiency, and support community development.

== Directors, 1964–1981 ==
- R. Sargent Shriver 1964–1968
- Bertrand Harding 1968–1969
- Donald Rumsfeld 1969–1971
- Frank C. Carlucci 1971–1972
- Philip V. Sanchez 1972–1973
- Howard Phillips (acting) 1973–1973
- Alvin J. Arnett 1973–1974
- Bert A. Gallegos 1974–1976
- Samuel Martinez 1976–1977
- Graciela Olivarez 1977–1980
