= War on Poverty =

1964 policies of U.S. president Lyndon B. Johnson

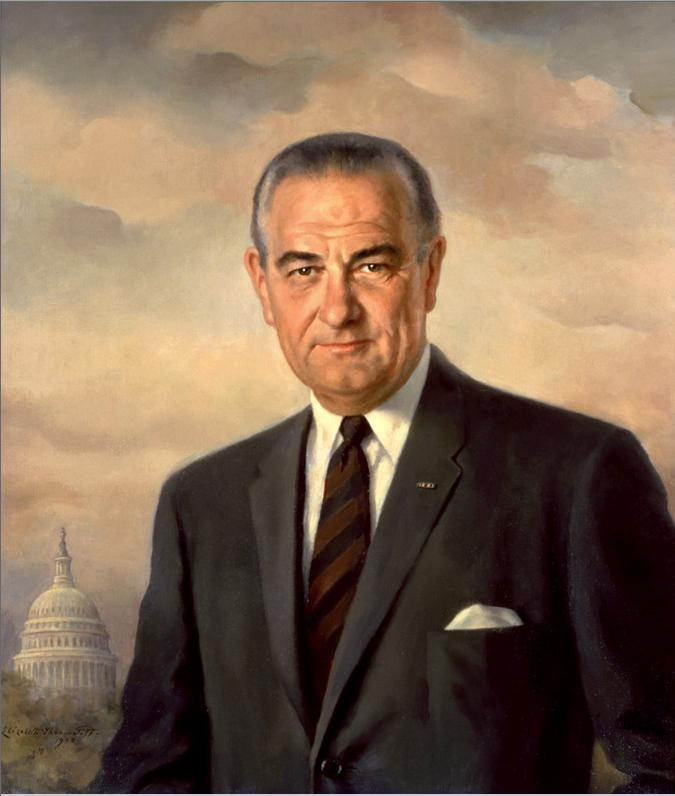
- President Lyndon B. Johnson's official White House portrait, by Elizabeth Shoumatoff
- Date: Introduced: January 8, 1964; Active era: 1964–1968 (Great Society framework)
- Location: United States
- Participants: Lyndon B. Johnson; Sargent Shriver; United States Congress; Office of Economic Opportunity
- Outcome: Creation of Medicare and Medicaid * Passage of the Economic Opportunity Act of 1964 and Food Stamp Act of 1964 * Establishment of Head Start and Job Corps * Persistent reductions in U.S. poverty rates during the 1960s

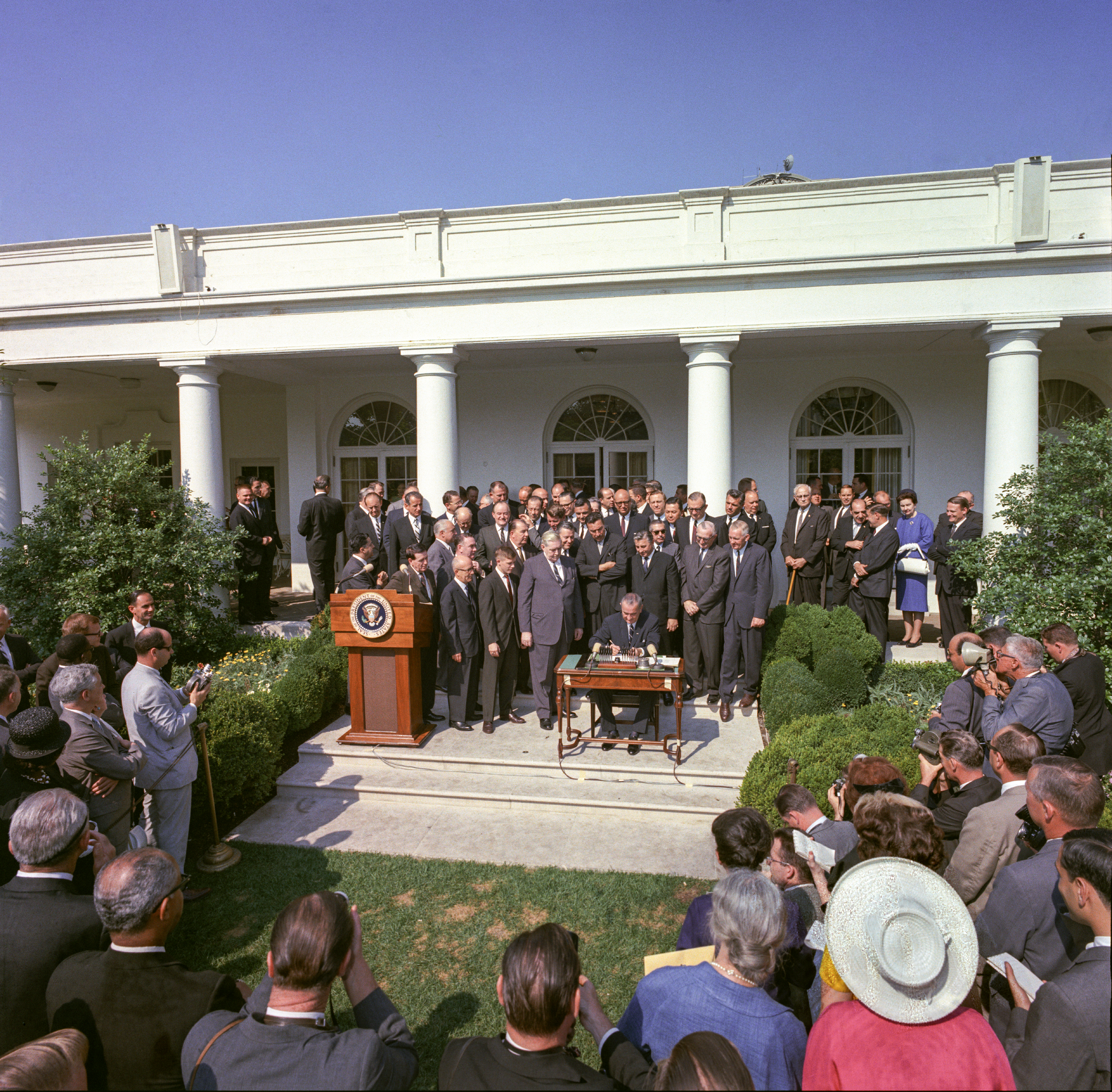
President Lyndon B. Johnson signed the Poverty Bill (also known as the Economic Opportunity Act) while press and supporters of the bill looked on, August 20, 1964.

The War on Poverty is a legislative initiative for poverty reduction in the United States that was introduced by President Lyndon B. Johnson during his State of the Union Address on January 8, 1964. This legislation was proposed by Johnson in response to a national poverty rate of around nineteen percent. The speech led the United States Congress to pass the Economic Opportunity Act, which established the Office of Economic Opportunity (OEO) to administer the local application of federal funds targeted against poverty. The forty programs established by the Act were collectively aimed at eliminating poverty by improving living conditions for residents of low-income neighborhoods and by helping the poor access new economic opportunities.

As a part of the Great Society, Johnson believed in expanding the federal government's roles in education and health care as poverty reduction strategies. These policies can also be seen as a continuation of Franklin D. Roosevelt's New Deal, which ran from 1933 to 1937, and Roosevelt's Four Freedoms of 1941. Prior to John F. Kennedy's assassination in November 1963, Kennedy planned on proposing anti-poverty legislation in the 1964 State of the Union address that Johnson ended up giving. In that address, Johnson stated, "Our aim is not only to relieve the symptom of poverty, but to cure it and, above all, to prevent it".

The War on Poverty was heavily criticized by conservatives and has been treated as an "idealistic touchstone" by liberals for decades, although some liberals felt that the War on Poverty did not go far enough with its reforms. Deregulation, growing criticism of the welfare state, and an ideological shift to reducing federal aid to impoverished people in the 1980s and 1990s culminated in the Personal Responsibility and Work Opportunity Act of 1996, which President Bill Clinton claimed "ended welfare as we know it". The legacy of the War on Poverty policy initiative remains in the continued existence of such federal government programs as Head Start, Volunteers in Service to America (VISTA), TRiO, and Job Corps.

The official poverty rate fell from 19.5% in 1963 to 11.1% in 1973, and has been steady since then. In 2021 the official poverty rate was 11.6% and Supplemental Poverty Measure (SPM) was 7.8%, the latter which increased to 12.4% in 2022 due to the end of pandemic aid.

== Major initiatives ==
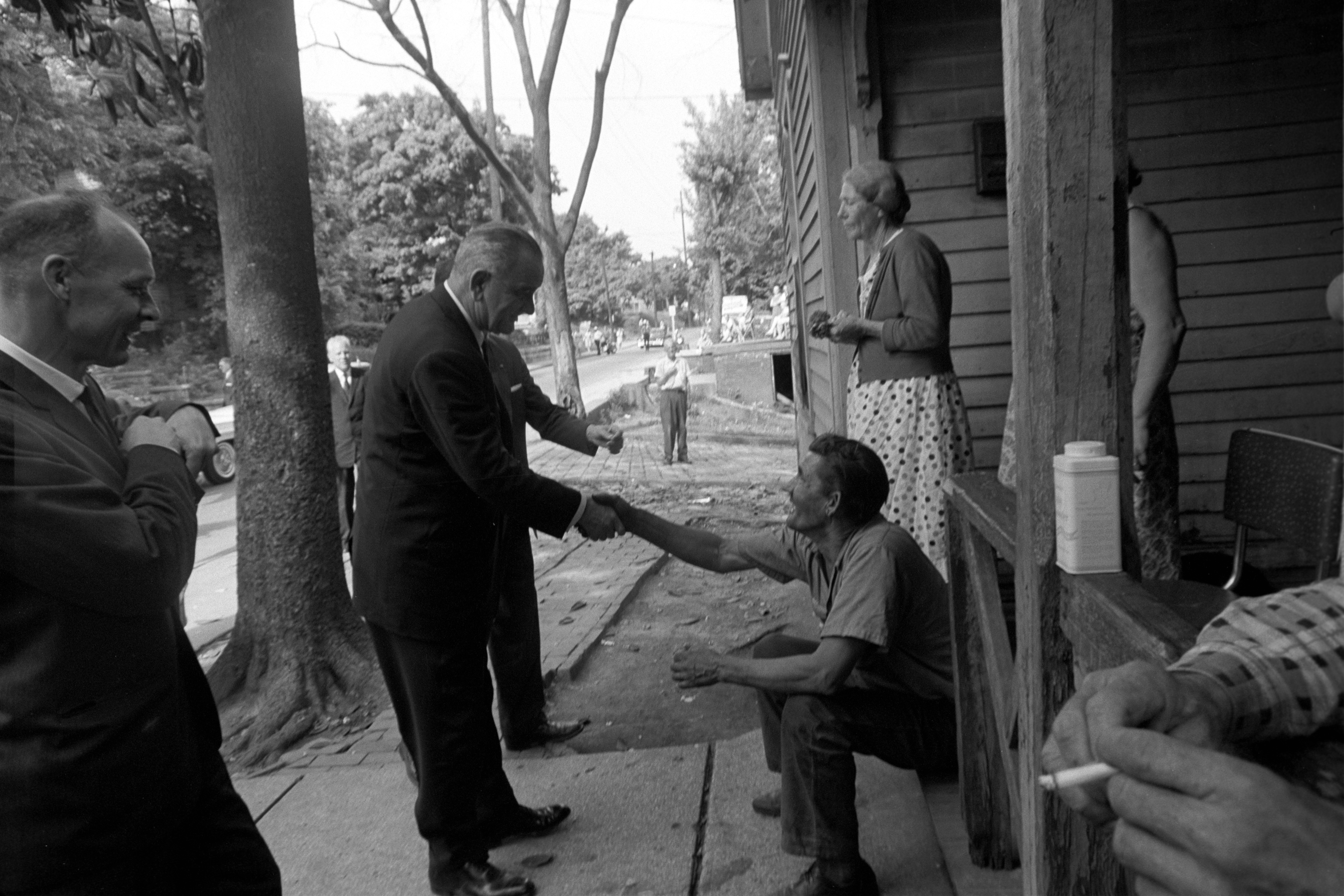
President Johnson's poverty tour in 1964

- The Economic Opportunity Act of 1964 which created the Community Action Program, Job Corps and Volunteers in Service to America (VISTA), centerpiece of the "War on Poverty" – August 20, 1964
- Food Stamp Act of 1964 – August 31, 1964
- Elementary and Secondary Education Act – April 11, 1965
- Social Security Act of 1965, which created Medicare and Medicaid – July 30, 1965

The Office of Economic Opportunity was the agency responsible for administering most of the War on Poverty programs created during Johnson's Administration, including VISTA, Job Corps, Head Start, Legal Services and the Community Action Program. The OEO was established in 1964 and quickly became a target of both left-wing and right-wing critics of the War on Poverty. Directors of the OEO included Sargent Shriver, Bertrand Harding, and Donald Rumsfeld.

The OEO launched Project Head Start as an eight-week summer program in 1965. The project was designed to help end poverty by providing preschool children from low-income families with a program that would meet emotional, social, health, nutritional, and psychological needs. Head Start was then transferred to the Office of Child Development in the Department of Health, Education, and Welfare (later the Department of Health and Human Services) by the Nixon Administration in 1969.

President Johnson also announced a second project to follow children from the Head Start program. This was implemented in 1967 with Project Follow Through, the largest educational experiment ever conducted.

The policy trains disadvantaged and at-risk youth and has provided more than 2 million disadvantaged young people with the integrated academic, vocational, and social skills training they need to gain independence and get quality, long-term jobs or further their education. Job Corps continues to help 70,000 youths annually at 122 Job Corps centers throughout the country. Besides vocational training, many Job Corps also offer GED programs as well as high school diplomas and programs to get students into college.

== Results and aftermath ==
After a decline in the 1960s, poverty rates remained in a relatively stable range in subsequent decades.

Some economists have claimed that the War on Poverty did not result in a substantial reduction in poverty rates. Other critics have further claimed that Johnson's programs made poor people too dependent on the government. Other scholars have disputed these criticisms. The effectiveness of the War on Poverty was limited by American involvement in the Vietnam War, which consumed the country's economic resources.

In the decade following the 1964 introduction of the War on Poverty, poverty rates in the U.S. dropped to their lowest level since comprehensive records began in 1958: from 17.3% in the year the Economic Opportunity Act was implemented to 11.1% in 1973. They have remained between 11 and 15.2% ever since. The steep decline in poverty rates began in 1959, 5 years before the introduction of the War on Poverty (see figure 4 below).

A 2019 National Bureau of Economic Research paper found that according to Johnson's standard of poverty, the poverty rate declined from 19.5 percent in 1963 to 2.3 percent in 2017.

The "absolute poverty line" is the threshold below which families or individuals are considered to be lacking the resources to meet the basic needs for healthy living—namely, having insufficient income to provide the food, shelter and clothing needed to preserve health. Poverty among Americans between ages 18–64 has fallen only marginally since 1966, from 10.5% then to 10.1% today. Poverty has significantly fallen among Americans under 18 years old from 23% in 1964 down to less than 17%, although it has risen again to 20% in 2009. The most dramatic decrease in poverty was among Americans over 65, which fell from 28.5% in 1966 to 10.1% today.

In 2004, more than 35.9 million, or 12% of Americans including 12.1 million children, were considered to be living in poverty with an average growth of almost 1 million per year. According to the Cato Institute, a libertarian think tank, since the Johnson Administration, almost $15 trillion has been spent on welfare, with poverty rates being about the same as during the Johnson Administration. A 2013 study published by Columbia University asserts that without the social safety net, the poverty rate would have been 29% for 2012, instead of 16%. According to OECD data from 2012, the poverty rate before taxes and transfers was 28.3%, while the poverty rate after taxes and transfers fell to 17.4%.

Nixon attacked Job Corps as an ineffective and wasteful program during his 1968 presidential campaign and sought to substantially cut back the program upon taking office in 1969. The OEO was dismantled by President Reagan in 1981, though many of the agency's programs were transferred to other government agencies.

According to the Readers' Companion to U.S. Women's History,

Many observers point out that the war on poverty's attention to Black America created the grounds for the backlash that began in the 1970s. The perception by the white middle class that it was footing the bill for ever-increasing services to the poor led to diminished support for welfare state programs, especially those that targeted specific groups and neighborhoods. Many whites viewed Great Society programs as supporting the economic and social needs of low-income urban minorities; they lost sympathy, especially as the economy declined during the 1970s.

United States Secretary of Health, Education, and Welfare under President Jimmy Carter, Joseph A. Califano, Jr. wrote in 1999 in an issue of the Washington Monthly that:

The fallout and backlash from the war on poverty gave way to what Kaaryn Gustafson called the criminalization of poverty. As white middle-class Americans became more disgruntled about the “government handouts” that Black low-income communities were receiving, policymakers and legislators took action to respond to their concerns. This led to more substantial restrictions on welfare and the policing of recipients of government assistance. The resentment that middle-class Americans harbored against communities on welfare translated into anti-welfare fraud policies that disproportionately targeted low-income Black communities and failed at responding to the most egregious forms of fraud. In waging the war on poverty, congressional opposition was too strong to pass an income maintenance law. So LBJ took advantage of the biggest automatic cash machine around: Social Security. He proposed, and Congress enacted, whopping increases in the minimum benefits that lifted some two million Americans 65 and older above the poverty line. In 1996, thanks to those increased minimum benefits, Social Security lifted 12 million senior citizens above the poverty line ... No Great Society undertaking has been subjected to more withering conservative attacks than the Office of Economic Opportunity. Yet, the war on poverty was founded on the most conservative principle: Put the power in the local community, not in Washington; give people at the grassroots the ability to stand tall on their own two feet. Conservative claims that the OEO poverty programs were nothing but a waste of money are preposterous ... Eleven of the 12 programs that OEO launched in the mid-'60s are alive, well and funded at an annual rate exceeding $10 billion; apparently legislators believe they're still working.

A 2019 study in the Journal of Political Economy found that the official poverty rate has fallen from 19.5% to 1.6%.

== Reception and critique ==
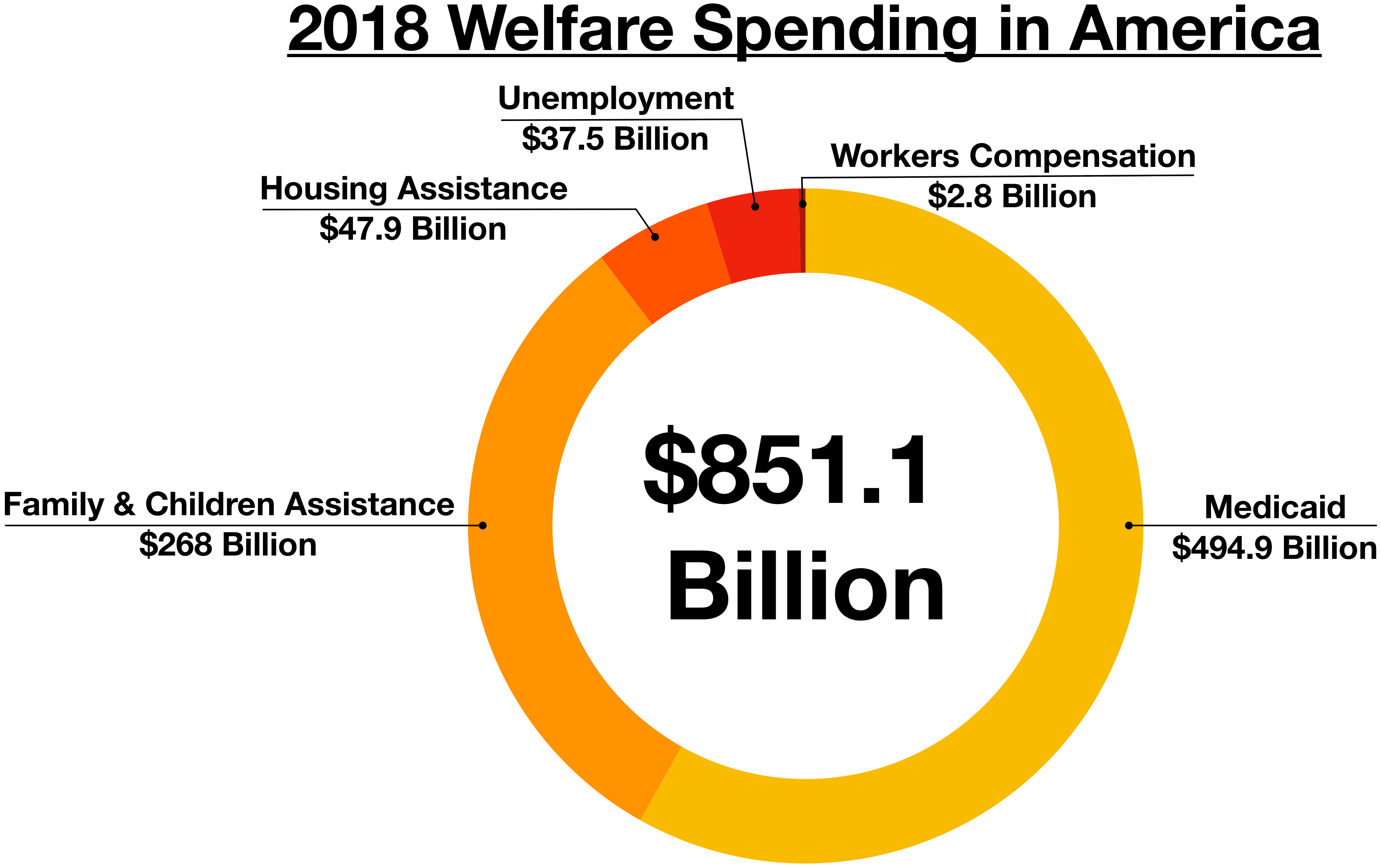
Welfare in America

President Johnson's "War on Poverty" speech was delivered at a time of recovery (the poverty level had fallen from 22.4% in 1959 to 19% in 1964 when the War on Poverty was announced) and it was viewed by critics as an effort to get the United States Congress to authorize social welfare programs. Republicans ran against the War on Poverty program.

Some economists, including Milton Friedman, have argued that Johnson's policies had a negative impact on the economy because of their interventionist nature, noting in a PBS interview that "the government sets out to eliminate poverty, it has a war on poverty, so-called "poverty" increases. It has a welfare program, and the welfare program leads to an expansion of problems. A general attitude develops that government isn't a very efficient way of doing things." Adherents of this libertarian school of thought recommend that the best way to fight poverty is not through government spending but through economic growth.

Historian Tony Judt said in reference to the earlier proposed title of the Personal Responsibility and Work Opportunity Act that "a more Orwellian title would be hard to conceive" and attributed the decline in the popularity of the Great Society as a policy to its success, as fewer people feared hunger, sickness, and ignorance. Additionally, fewer people were concerned with ensuring a minimum standard for all citizens and social liberalism.

Economist Thomas Sowell also criticized the War on Poverty's programs, writing "The black family, which had survived centuries of slavery and discrimination, began rapidly disintegrating in the liberal welfare state that subsidized unwed pregnancy and changed welfare from an emergency rescue to a way of life."

Others took a different tack. In 1967, in his book Where Do We Go from Here: Chaos or Community? Martin Luther King Jr. "criticized Johnson's war on poverty for being too piecemeal", saying that programs created under the "War on Poverty" such as "housing programs, job training and family counseling" all had "a fatal disadvantage [because] the programs have never proceeded on a coordinated basis...[and noted that] at no time has a total, coordinated and fully adequate program been conceived." In his speech on April 4, 1967, at Riverside Church in New York, NY, King connected the war in Vietnam with the "War on Poverty":

There is at the outset a very obvious and almost facile connection between the war in Vietnam and the struggle I, and others, have been waging in America. A few years ago there was a shining moment in that struggle. It seemed as if there was a real promise of hope for the poor –both black and white – through the poverty program. There were experiments, hopes, new beginnings. Then came the buildup in Vietnam and I watched the program broken and eviscerated as if it were some idle political plaything of a society gone mad on war, and I knew that America would never invest the necessary funds or energies in rehabilitation of its poor so long as adventures like Vietnam continued to draw men and skills and money like some demonic destructive suction tube. So I was increasingly compelled to see the war as an enemy of the poor and to attack it as such. Perhaps the more tragic recognition of reality took place when it became clear to me that the war was doing far more than devastating the hopes of the poor at home.

This criticism was repeated in his speech at the same place later that month when he said that "and you may not know it, my friends, but it is estimated that we spend $500,000 to kill each enemy soldier, while we spend only fifty-three dollars for each person classified as poor, and much of that fifty-three dollars goes for salaries to people that are not poor. So I was increasingly compelled to see the war as an enemy of the poor, and attack it as such." The next year, King started the Poor People's Campaign to address the shortcomings of the "War on Poverty" and to "demand a check" for suffering African-Americans which was carried on briefly after his death with the construction and maintenance of an encampment, Resurrection City, for over six weeks. Years later, a writer in The Nation remarked that "the War on Poverty has too often been a war on the poor themselves", but that much can be done.

In 1989, the former executive officer of the Task Force on Poverty Hyman Bookbinder addressed such criticisms of the "War on Poverty" in an op-ed in The New York Times. He wrote that:

Today, the ranks of the poor are again swelling ... These and other statistics have led careless observers to conclude that the war on poverty failed. No, it has achieved many good results. Society has failed. It tired of the war too soon, gave it inadequate resources and did not open up new fronts as required. Large-scale homelessness, an explosion of teen-age pregnancies and single-parent households, rampant illiteracy, drugs and crime – these have been both the results of and causes of persistent poverty. While it is thus inappropriate to celebrate an anniversary of the war on poverty, it is important to point up some of the big gains ... Did every program of the 60's work? Was every dollar used to its maximum potential? Should every Great Society program be reinstated or increased? Of course not ... First, we cannot afford not to resume the war. One way or another, the problem will remain expensive. Somehow, we will provide for the survival needs of the poorest: welfare, food stamps, beds and roofs for the homeless, Medicaid. The fewer poor there are, the fewer the relief problems. Getting people out of poverty is the most cost-effective public investment."

On March 3, 2014, as Chairman of the Budget Committee of the House of Representatives, Paul Ryan released his "The War on Poverty: 50 Years Later" report, asserting that some of 92 federal programs designed to help lower-income Americans have not provided the relief intended and that there is little evidence that these efforts have been successful. At the core of the report were recommendations to enact cuts to welfare, child care, college Pell grants and several other federal assistance programs. In the appendix titled "Measures of Poverty", when the poverty rate is measured by including non-cash assistance from food stamps, housing aid and other federal programs, the report states that these measurements have "implications for both conservatives and liberals. For conservatives, this suggests that federal programs have actually decreased poverty. For liberals, it lessens the supposed need to expand existing programs or to create new ones." Several economists and social scientists whose work had been referenced in the report said that Ryan either misunderstood or misrepresented their research.

== See also ==
- History of poverty in the United States
- Modern liberalism in the United States
- Social programs in the United States
- The Other America
- Welfare economics

Preceded by 1963 State of the Union Address	State of the Union addresses 1964	Succeeded by 1965 State of the Union Address
