= Bernie Jackson =

American sprinter (1961-1997)

Personal information
- Born: October 22, 1961 Phoenix, Arizona, United States
- Died: November 1, 1997 (aged 36) New River, Arizona, United States

Sport
- Sport: Track and field
Medal record
Representing United States
Pan American Games
Gold medal – first place	1983 Caracas	4x100m relay
Bronze medal – third place	1983 Caracas	200 metres
Summer Universiade
Bronze medal – third place	1983 Edmonton	200 metres

Bernard Leroy Jackson Jr. (October 22, 1961–November 1, 1997) was an American former sprinter, musician, and poet. He was the 1983 Pan American 4 × 100 m champion and won a bronze medal in the 200 metres.

== Career ==
Jackson was from Phoenix, Arizona and attended McClintock High School, where he was considered the nation's top prep sprinter. Surprisingly, he chose to attend the University of Washington rather than a school with a better track and field reputation.

Jackson was an All-American sprinter for the Washington Huskies track and field team, finishing 7th in the 200 metres at the 1981 NCAA Division I Outdoor Track and Field Championships. After one year at Washington, Jackson returned to Arizona where he competed for Mesa Community College in the NJCAA. At Mesa, Jackson ran 9.9 seconds hand timed over 100 meters. He returned to the NCAA to compete for the Alabama Crimson Tide track and field team, where he finished runner-up in the 4 × 400 meters relay at the 1985 NCAA Division I Outdoor Track and Field Championships. Jackson also set an NCAA record in the 4 × 400 m relay at Alabama.

In 1987, Jackson retired from competitive sprinting at age 26. He was frustrated and suspected that his younger rivals were taking performance-enhancing drugs.

== Personal life ==
Jackson was born on October 22, 1961 to parents Bernard and Joan and grew up in Tempe, Arizona. He had two sisters, Maranda and Tracy. His father Bernard Jackson Sr. was a reverend and pastor at the Bethel African Methodist Episcopal Church in Phoenix, and Jackson lived in Winslow, Arizona while his father worked at the Job Corps government base there.

In addition to his sports career, Jackson was also an accomplished musician and published poet. Two of his poems were published in anthologies. Jackson was engaged to a woman with whom he had a daughter born c. 1987, but he did not get married.

Following his athletic career, Jackson struggled with a cocaine addiction. In 1993, he was arrested for unlawful use of transportation and forgery and was released from state prison in January 1995. In August 1995, Jackson was convicted of bank robbery and was sentenced to 51 months at the Federal Corrections Institute in New River, Arizona which was later reduced. In prison, Jackson worked in the law library and wrote briefs to the warden for illiterate inmates to advocate on their behalf.

Twelve months into his sentence, Jackson was killed via blunt-force cranial cerebral damage while in prison.
