= Job Corps =

Voluntary program in the United States

- Official logo of the United States Job Corps

Federal program overview
- Formed: 1964 (62 years ago)
- Type: Vocational Education
- Jurisdiction: United States
- Headquarters: Washington, D.C.
- Federal program executive: John E. Hall, Administrator
- Parent department: Department of Labor
- Parent Federal program: Employment and Training Administration
- Key document: Economic Opportunity Act of 1964
- Website: www.jobcorps.gov

Job Corps is a program administered by the United States Department of Labor that offers free education and vocational training to people ages 16 to 24.

== Mission and purpose ==
Job Corps' mission is to help young people ages 16 through 24 improve the quality of their lives through vocational and academic training aimed at gainful employment and career pathways.

== History ==
=== Founding ===
The Job Corps was originally designed by a task force established by Labor Secretary Willard Wirtz reporting to Manpower Administrator Sam Merrick. In 1962, the youth unemployment rate was twice the non-youth unemployment rate and the purpose of the initiative was to create a program whereby Youth members of the program could spend half of their time improving national parks and forests and the other half of their time improving their basic education skills which were severely limiting their occupational accomplishments. The Job Corps Task Force initially recommended that Job Corps programs be limited to Federal National Parks, National Forests, and other Federal Lands.

By the time of the Kennedy assassination in 1963, the Job Corps' operational plans, costs, and budgets had been well developed, including coordination with the U. S. Forest Service and the National Park Service, and Memoranda of Understanding (MOUs) executed among the agencies. Initiating legislation and budgetary authorizations were drafted by the Kennedy Administration and introduced in both houses of Congress.

In 1964, President Johnson, facing military manpower shortages for the Vietnam War, suggested that the Job Corps could be useful in preparing young men to meet the mental and physical requirements for military enlistment.

When President Johnson and his planning staff decided on the War on Poverty, most of the proposed programs would take more than a year to even start. However the Job Corps idea was well along in the planning stage and could be deployed rapidly, so the Labor Department Job Corps Task Force was appointed to the Task force for the War on Poverty, and the Job Corps was slated to be the initial operational program.

Job Corps was therefore initiated as the central program of the Johnson Administration's War on Poverty, part of his domestic agenda known as the Great Society. Sargent Shriver, the first Director of the Office of Economic Opportunity, modeled the program on the Depression-era Civilian Conservation Corps (CCC). Established in the 1930s as an emergency relief program, the CCC provided room, board, and employment to thousands of unemployed young people. Though the CCC was discontinued after World War II, Job Corps built on many of its methods and strategies.

The first national director of the Job Corps program was S. Stephen Uslan, who was appointed by President Lyndon Johnson and reported directly to Sargent Shriver. In the mid-1960's, the Job Corps was headed by Dr. Otis A. Singletary. The current national director of the Office of Job Corps is Rachel Torres. The Job Corps program is currently authorized under Title I of the Workforce Innovation and Opportunity Act.

=== 20th century ===
President Richard Nixon sought to shrink the program, and President Ronald Reagan sought to eliminate it, but the program continued with bipartisan Congressional support.

=== 21st century ===
A series of audits, studies and investigations—public and private—starting in the late 1990s, and extending through to the early 2020s, cast doubt on the safety and cost-effectiveness of the program, and have brought calls for the program's end. But bipartisan Congressional support has kept the program alive.

In the years following the deaths of two Job Corps students, Congress examined safety conditions at the program's training centers. At a June 2017 hearing before the House Education and the Workforce Committee, Labor Department Deputy Inspector General Larry Turner testified that staff at 11 centers had failed to report potential serious criminal misconduct to law enforcement in nearly 40 percent of the 348 serious incidents reviewed. He also reported serious physical security lapses at 12 centers, including limited security staff, compromised perimeters, and inconsistent procedures for staff background checks.

With a $1.7 billion annual budget (in 2014 and 2018), it is the U.S. Department of Labor's largest-budget training program, providing about 37,000 training slots for young people annually.

In April 2018, a Department of Labor Office of Inspector General report examined Job Corps' employment and training outcomes. The audit found that, among 50 sampled participants for whom complete employment data were available, 27 were working in jobs similar to those they had held before entering the program. It also found that Job Corps had paid contractors for transition services that were not adequately performed. In a sample of 324 alumni, contractors had assisted only 18 participants in finding employment, while the audit estimated that Job Corps had paid contractors approximately $70.7 million for transition services that they failed to adequately perform.

Starting in 2020, the COVID-19 pandemic triggered the closure of Job Corps physical sites, and the organization attempted to shift to online education. Enrollment dropped by about 75 percent.

Since its inception in 1964 under the Economic Opportunity Act, Job Corps has served more than 2 million young people. As of 2019, Job Corps serves over 60,000 youths annually at Job Corps centers throughout the country.

In May 2025, the U.S. Department of Labor announced a nationwide pause of Job Corps center operations by June 30, 2025, following a review of the program's outcomes, financial structure, and safety concerns. The decision drew bipartisan pushback, with supporters highlighting its role in training 50,000 low-income youth aged 16-24 each year. Critics, however, pointed to persistent issues, including violence at centers and mixed economic returns. Job Corps programs continued to operate while legal challenges were considered and on August 10, 2026 the Department of Labor filed a settlement to a suit by seven Job Corps participants; as part of that settlement, the Department agreed to rescind the "nationwide pause" announced in May, 2025.

Job Corps operators disputed the department's disparaging characterization of the program. The Management and Training Corporation (MTC), which operated 16 Job Corps centers, said that the program's costs also covered housing, meals, and supportive services such as mental health and substance-use prevention. The National Job Corps Association attributed the low graduation rate and increased cost per graduate in part to disruptions caused by the COVID-19 pandemic.

== Eligibility ==
People are eligible for Job Corps by meeting the following criteria:

- Is a legal U.S. resident; lawfully admitted permanent resident alien, refugee, or asylee, or other immigrant who has been authorized by the U.S. attorney general to work in the United States; or resident of a U.S. territory.
- Meets low-income criteria.
- Is 16 to 24 years of age.°
- Does not have specific criminal convictions or active probation.
- Is in need of additional technical training, education, or related assistance to complete schoolwork or to find and keep a job.
- Has signed consent from a parent or guardian if a minor.
- Does not exhibit behavioral problems that could prevent them or others from experiencing Job Corps' full benefits.
- Does not use prohibited drugs.

°Unless waived due to disability.

== Phases of career development ==
Applicants to the Job Corps program are identified and screened for eligibility by organizations contracted by the U.S. Department of Labor. Each student in the Job Corps goes through three stages of the program:

Career Preparation: This period focuses on the assimilation of the student to Job Corps academic assessment, health screening, career exploration, and instruction on career planning. This phase lasts for up to the first 60 days of enrollment.

Career Development: This period is where the student receives all vocational training, academic instruction, employability and social skills development, and driver's education.

Career Transition: The period is preceded by a focus on transition readiness, and is the phase of services that immediately follows a student after they leave Job Corps. Career Transition Specialists assist with job placement or searches, and provide support and referrals for housing, transportation, and other essential components of living needed by the former student to obtain and retain employment.

== Career paths ==
Career Technical Training programs (often called vocational programs) offered by Job Corps vary by campus location. Example careers include machinist, auto mechanic, electrician, 911 dispatcher, dental assistant, corrections officer, cook, computer technician, landscaper, and truck driver.

== Locations ==
There are a total of 121 Job Corps centers, including one in Washington, D.C., and two in Puerto Rico.

There are six Regional Offices of Job Corps:

- Atlanta Region
- Boston Region
- Chicago Region
- Dallas Region
- Philadelphia Region
- San Francisco Region

== Evaluations ==
In Program Year 2012, approximately 75 percent of Job Corps' graduates were reportedly placed. Slightly more than 60 percent joined the workforce or enlisted in the military, while 13.5 percent of Job Corps' graduates enrolled in education programs. However, analysts have suggested that the data fails to reflect that many of the job placements were in low-skill, low-wage jobs that they could have gotten without Job Corps participation, such as fast-food work or the military.

=== Mathematica ===
From 1993 to 2008, Princeton University affiliate research organization Mathematica produced a series of evaluations and reports on the Job Corps for the agency's parent, the U.S. Department of Labor, and for independent academic journals. Their long-term study involved repeated nationwide surveys of over 6,800 Job Corps participants, and a "control group" of over 4,400 comparable non-participants, over a four-year period—and, in some reports, used the government-held, employer-reported tax records of individual workers for analysis of the survey subjects' economic outcomes.

Their researchers ultimately concluded that "the Job Corps model" shows "promise"—adding that the program's effect on participating youth "increases [their] educational attainment, reduces [their] criminal activity, and increases [their] earnings for several postprogram years." However, they noted that "tax data" indicated that—except for "the oldest participants" (young adults in their early 20s)—most participants' "earnings gains were not sustained" beyond four years after leaving the program.

That said, Mathematica concluded that the Job Corps is "the only federal training program... shown to increase earnings for this [disadvantaged youth] population."

However, the cost of the program, they concluded, exceeds the overall positive economic impact on society (from slightly improved social outcomes, like reduced crime and reduced welfare expenditures). One of the study's leaders, Mathematica senior fellow Peter Schochet, asserted that the program is "a good deal for... enrollees themselves," but acknowledged that—"from society's perspective"—"the [Job Corps] program... does not pay for itself."

=== Heritage Foundation ===
In 2009 the conservative think-tank, The Heritage Foundation, described the program's 40-year history as a "record of failure"—citing specific findings from that Mathematica journal article, including that Job Corps participants were less likely than non-participants to "earn a high school diploma"; not any more likely to complete, or even attend, college; and earnings of Job Corps participants were essentially the same as a "control group" of similar non-participants.

In their 2009 critique, additionally citing a 2001 Mathematica study, the Heritage Foundation noted that income gains for participants (vs. comparable non-participants) was "never more than $25.20" per week, while they cited a 2003 Mathematica study (withheld from the public by the government until 2006) as indicating negative impacts on childless female participants' incomes from 1998 through 2001.

Complaining that Job Corps fails to "substantially raise the wages of participants"—at a cost of "$25,000 per participant" for an eight-month "average participation period"—the Heritage Foundation described the agency as "a waste of taxpayers' dollars," and "an ideal candidate" to be on "the budget chopping block."

=== Government Accountability Office ===
A report from the Government Accountability Office cited over 13,500 safety incidents at Job Corps centers from 2016 to 2017—most of them drug-related or assaults.

=== Trump administration ===
In April 2017, the Trump administration's Labor Department inspector general concluded that the agency could not show "beneficial training outcomes."

On May 29, 2025, the Department of Labor announced it would be pausing contractor-operated Job Corps sites nationwide. The official press release cited the organization's $140 million deficit in PY 2024, and included an estimation of $119 million in savings by pausing its operations. The approximately 25,000 students enrolled in the program were to be given documentation and resources to enroll in different workforce development programs.

== Controversy ==
See 1995 Murder of Colleen Slemmer

- According to Betsey B. Creekmore, in "Job Corps Student Murdered on Agriculture Campus" (2015):

The 1995 murder was not the first serious event connecting the Job Corps Center and UT. In December 1993 two Jobs Corps residents were accused of attacking two UT students who were sitting in a car at the fringe of campus. The male student was badly beaten; the female student was driven elsewhere and raped. Both Job Corps students were convicted of the crimes

While the Job Corps has remained popular with politicians in both parties (and with private contractors who operate and service Job Corps centers), there have been many critics of the program, from liberal and conservative sources, alike, and questions raised about the program's safety and effectiveness.

Anecdotal evidence against the program, at specific sites, multiplied in the 2010s.

In October 2014, CBS News reported on its investigation of a Job Corps training center in North Texas, quoting a student as experiencing "constant fights" (though one attacker strangled him, the attacker was allowed to continue in the program). They quoted a fired security guard, a former police sergeant, as witnessing drug use ("marijuana, cocaine, heroin") but being pressured by management to keep quiet about it, despite the official Job Corps "zero tolerance" for drug use. (CBS obtained video of a student cutting a white powder on his desk). Student expulsions reportedly hurt contractor and agency standing.

CBS interviewed a former Albuquerque center teacher who alleged that welding students who failed to attend training were given welding-competence certificates, anyway, to take into the workforce. A former career counselor in Texas reported that management pressure to get "job placements" resulted in "85 percent" of reported placements being "fake." CBS noted that 3 years earlier, the Labor Department's inspector general determined that Job Corps had "overstated 42 percent" of job placements at five sites—and that many of the reported jobs were simply in fast food work.

A CBS affiliate in Milwaukee checked records on their local Job Corps center, and found 11 police reports between 2012-2014, including a knife attack and a student shot.

In 2015, the Washington Post noted "violence and even murders" had occurred "at some Job Corps sites," and—"despite [an official] zero-tolerance policy [forbidding] violence and illegal drugs"—[various] "local job corps centers... failed to report and investigate [incidents of] serious misconduct, [such as] drug abuse and assaults," including "sexual assault." Further, the Post reported, some centers have reportedly understated these offenses, in their official record, to keep student offenders enrolled.

However, progressive philanthropy advocate and watchdog Rick Cohen, writing in Nonprofit Quarterly, expressed skepticism of complaints, suggesting that many of these problems were not abnormal for that demographic, whether in Job Corps or not—and suggested that racial bias may have played a role in suspicions and reporting of perceived problems.

In 2017, Labor Department deputy inspector general Larry D. Turner, testifying before a Congressional committee, reported that Job Corps officials and contractors often failed to report "potentially serious criminal misconduct" to local, state or federal law enforcement—noting that, of the 12 centers inspectors visited (out of 129), all but one failed to report to law enforcement various "potentially serious criminal misconduct incidents," leaving 40 percent of 348 such incidents unreported at those 11 sites. He also noted that Job Corps sites typically had "Physical security weaknesses" (such as "inadequate [or] unmonitored closed circuit television systems," inadequate security staff, and "compromised perimeters," and failed to properly screen center employees."

Job Corps defenders argued that critics were overreacting to these shortcomings, which were not atypical of conditions in innercity and rural settings that Job Corps participants were fleeing.

In 2017, with per-student costs ranging from $15,000 to $45,000, President Trump's Labor Secretary, Alexander Acosta, stated that the $1.7 billion annually budgeted program "requires fundamental reform"—not just "changes at the margins," but "large-scale changes."

== Notable members ==
- Charles Bradley (1948–2017) – American funk/soul/R&B singer, signed to Daptone Records
- George Foreman (1949–2025) – American professional boxer, businessman, minister, and author
- Mike Epps (born 1970) – comedian, actor
- Joseph S. Murphy (1933–1998) – From 1967 to 1968 Murphy served as Associate Director of the Job Corps, President of Queens College, President of Bennington College, and Chancellor of the City University of New York
- Colleen Slemmer (born 1975) – studied computer programming at the Job Corps in Knoxville. Murdered in 1995 by a fellow student at the Agriculture Campus, University of Tennessee
