= Food and Nutrition Act of 2008 =

United States law making the Food Stamp Program permanent

Food Stamp Act of 1964
- Long title: An Act to strengthen the agricultural economy; to help to achieve a fuller and more effective use of food abundances; to provide for improved levels of nutrition among economically needy households through a cooperative Federal-State program of food assistance to be operated through normal channels of trade; and for other purposes.
- Acronyms (colloquial): FSA
- Enacted by: the 88th United States Congress
- Effective: August 31, 1964

Citations
- Public law: Pub. L. 88–525
- Statutes at Large: 78 Stat. 703

Codification
- Titles amended: 7 U.S.C.: Agriculture
- U.S.C. sections created: 7 U.S.C. ch. 51 § 2011 et seq.

Legislative history
- Introduced in the House as H.R. 10222 by Leonor Sullivan (D-MO) on March 9, 1964; Committee consideration by House Agriculture, Senate Agriculture and Forestry; Passed the House on April 8, 1964 (229-189); Passed the Senate on June 30, 1964 (Passed) with amendment; House agreed to Senate amendment on August 11, 1964 (Agreed); Signed into law by President Lyndon B. Johnson on August 31, 1964

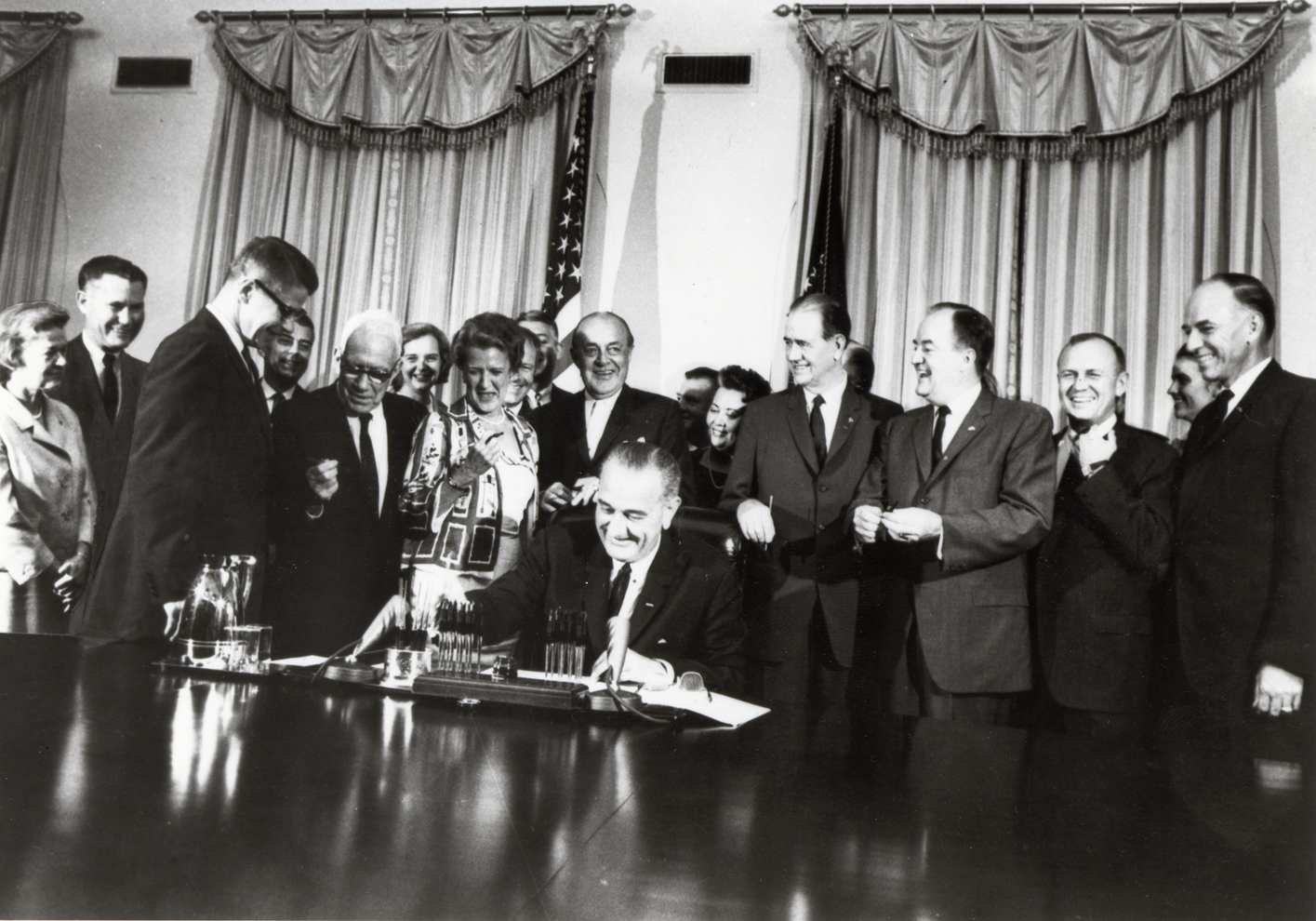
U.S. President Lyndon B. Johnson signing the Food Stamp Act of 1964

The Food and Nutrition Act of 2008, formerly known as the Food Stamp Act of 1964 and Food Stamp Act of 1977, provides permanent legislative authority to the Supplemental Nutrition Assistance Program, formerly known as the Food Stamp Program. On August 31, 1964 it was signed into law by President Lyndon B. Johnson.

It was later amended by the food stamp provisions of the Food and Agriculture Act of 1977, which eliminated the purchase requirement and simplified eligibility requirements. Amendments were made to this Act in 1981–82, 1984–85, 1988, 1990, 1994, 1996, 1997, 1998 and 2002, more recently by Title IV of the Farm Security and Rural Investment Act of 2002 (2002 farm bill). The Food, Conservation, and Energy Act of 2008 (2008 farm bill) renamed the act to the Food and Nutrition Act of 2008 and the Food Stamp Program to the Supplemental Nutrition Assistance Program.

== Amendments ==
Short title	Date of Enactment	Public Law Number	U.S. Statute Citation	U.S. Legislative Bill	U.S. Presidential Administration
	September 27, 1967	P.L. 90-91	81 Stat. 228	S. 953	Lyndon B. Johnson
	October 8, 1968	P.L. 90-552	82 Stat. 958	S. 3068	Lyndon B. Johnson
	January 11, 1971	P.L. 91-671	84 Stat. 2048	H.R. 18582	Richard M. Nixon
	July 12, 1974	P.L. 93-347	88 Stat. 340	S. 3458	Richard M. Nixon
	February 20, 1975	P.L. 94-4	89 Stat. 6	H.R. 1589	Gerald R. Ford
	July 5, 1976	P.L. 94-339	90 Stat. 799	S. 2853	Gerald R. Ford
Food and Agriculture Act of 1977	September 29, 1977	P.L. 95–113	91 Stat. 913	S. 275	Jimmy E. Carter
	1981–82				
	1984–85				
	1988				
	1990				
	1994				
	1996				
	1997				
	1998				
Farm Security and Rural Investment Act of 2002	May 13, 2002	P.L. 107–171	116 Stat. 134	H.R. 2646	George W. Bush
Food, Conservation, and Energy Act of 2008	June 18, 2008	P.L. 110–246	122 Stat. 1651	H.R. 2419, H.R. 6124	George W. Bush

== See also ==
- War on Poverty
