= The War on Poverty: 50 Years Later =

"The War on Poverty: 50 Years Later" is a report by the Budget Committee of the United States House of Representatives published on March 3, 2014. It was published in recognition of the 50th anniversary of Lyndon B. Johnson's 1964 State of the Union address, in which he declared "an unconditional war on poverty in America".

== Report ==
The reports advances the argument that federal antipoverty programs suffer from defects that "penalize families for getting ahead" and that "the complex web of federal programs and sudden drop-off in benefits create extraordinarily high effective marginal tax rates," both of which "reduce the incentive to work".

At the core of the report are recommendations to enact cuts to welfare, child care, college Pell grants and several other federal assistance programs. In an appendix titled "Measures of Poverty", when the poverty rate is measured by including non-cash assistance from food stamps, housing aid and other federal programs, the report states that these measurements "[have] implications for both conservatives and liberals. For conservatives, this suggests that federal programs have actually decreased poverty. For liberals, it lessens the supposed need to expand existing programs or to create new ones."

== Reception ==
Several economists and social scientists, Amy Finkelstein, Jane Waldfogel, Chris Wimer, Jeffrey Brown and Barbara Wolfe, whose work had been referenced in the report said that Paul Ryan, the committee's chairman, either misunderstood or misrepresented their research. One of the issues raised was that the report cites data from 1969 onward, and according to Waldfogel this ignores a full 36 percent of the decline in poverty using the Supplemental Poverty Measurement since 1967. Brown stated after the article's publication that Ryan quoted his research accurately, and that the Fiscal Times misrepresented his comments. The Financial Times later updated the article based on Brown's comment. All of the statistical errors were later corrected, and Waldfogel's criticism was fixed.

== Report contents ==
- Introduction
- Chapter 1: Cash Aid
- Chapter 2: Education and Job Training
- Chapter 3: Energy
- Chapter 4: Food Aid
- Chapter 5: Health Care
- Chapter 6: Housing
- Chapter 7: Social Services
- Chapter 8: Veterans
- Appendix I: Measures of Poverty
- Appendix II: Data

== See also ==
- War on Poverty
