= Economic Opportunity Act of 1964 =

Civil rights law of the United States

- Long title: An Act to mobilize the human and financial resources of the Nation to combat poverty in the United States.
- Enacted by: the 88th United States Congress
- Effective: August 20, 1964

Citations
- Public law: Pub. L. 88–452
- Statutes at Large: 78 Stat. 508

Legislative history
- Introduced in the Senate as S. 2642 by Patrick V. McNamara (D–MI) on March 1964; Passed the Senate on July 23, 1964 (61–34); Passed the House on August 8, 1964 (226–185) with amendment; Senate agreed to House amendment on August 8, 1964 (); Signed into law by President Lyndon B. Johnson on August 20, 1964

The Economic Opportunity Act of 1964 (Pub. L. 88–452) authorized the formation of local Community Action Agencies as part of the War on Poverty. These agencies are directly regulated by the federal government. "It is the purpose of The Economic Opportunity Act to strengthen, supplement, and coordinate efforts in furtherance of that policy".

== Purpose ==
- Eliminate poverty
- Expand educational opportunities
- Increase the net gain for the poor and unemployed
- Tend to health and financial needs of the elderly

=== War on Poverty ===
The War on Poverty was declared by President Lyndon B. Johnson in his State of the Union Address on January 8, 1964:

This administration today here and now declares unconditional war on poverty in America. I urge this Congress and all Americans to join me in that effort [...] Poverty is a national problem, requiring improved national organization and support. But this attack, to be effective, must also be organized at the State and local level. For the war against poverty will not be won here in Washington. It must be won in the field, in every private home, in every public office, from the courthouse to the White House. Very often, a lack of jobs and money is not the cause of poverty, but the symptom. Our aim is not only to relieve the symptoms of poverty but to cure it–and above all, to prevent it. No single piece of legislation, however, is going to suffice.

W. Willard Wirtz, Secretary of Labor during the Kennedy and Johnson administrations, was a major proponent of the Economic Opportunity Act of 1964. During a June 17, 1967, hearing before the Select Committee on Poverty of the Committee on Labor and Public Welfare of the United States Senate, Secretary Wirtz stated, "It has become clear that America is not going to put up with poverty amidst prosperity. We realize that by itself prosperity is not going to get rid of poverty." He emphasized that the war on poverty had two central objectives:

First, to provide jobs and training, especially for those young people now growing up in poverty, and increasingly condemned by lack of economic opportunity to repeat the cycle over again. Second, to begin the process of planning and organizing that will bring the entire resources of a community to bear on the specific problem of breaking up the cycle of poverty in that community.

The War on Poverty attacked the roots and consequences of poverty by creating job opportunities, increasing productivity, and enhancing the quality of life. The aim was not to end poverty but to eradicate the principal causes of it.

== History ==
On March 16, 1964, President Johnson called for the act in his Special Message to Congress that presented his proposal for a nationwide war on the sources of poverty. The Economic Opportunity Act of 1964 was passed as a part of LBJ's War on Poverty. Encompassing the Civil Rights Act of 1964, the Economic Opportunity Act of 1964 was created "to eliminate the paradox of poverty on the midst of plenty in this nation by opening…. To everyone… the opportunity for education and training, the opportunity to work, and the opportunity to live in decency and dignity."

In his 1964 Special Message to Congress, President Johnson declared "The Act does not merely expand on old programs or improve what was already being done. It charts a new course. It strikes at the causes of poverty…Not just the consequences of poverty. It can be a milestone in our 180-year search for a better life for your people."

== Legislation ==
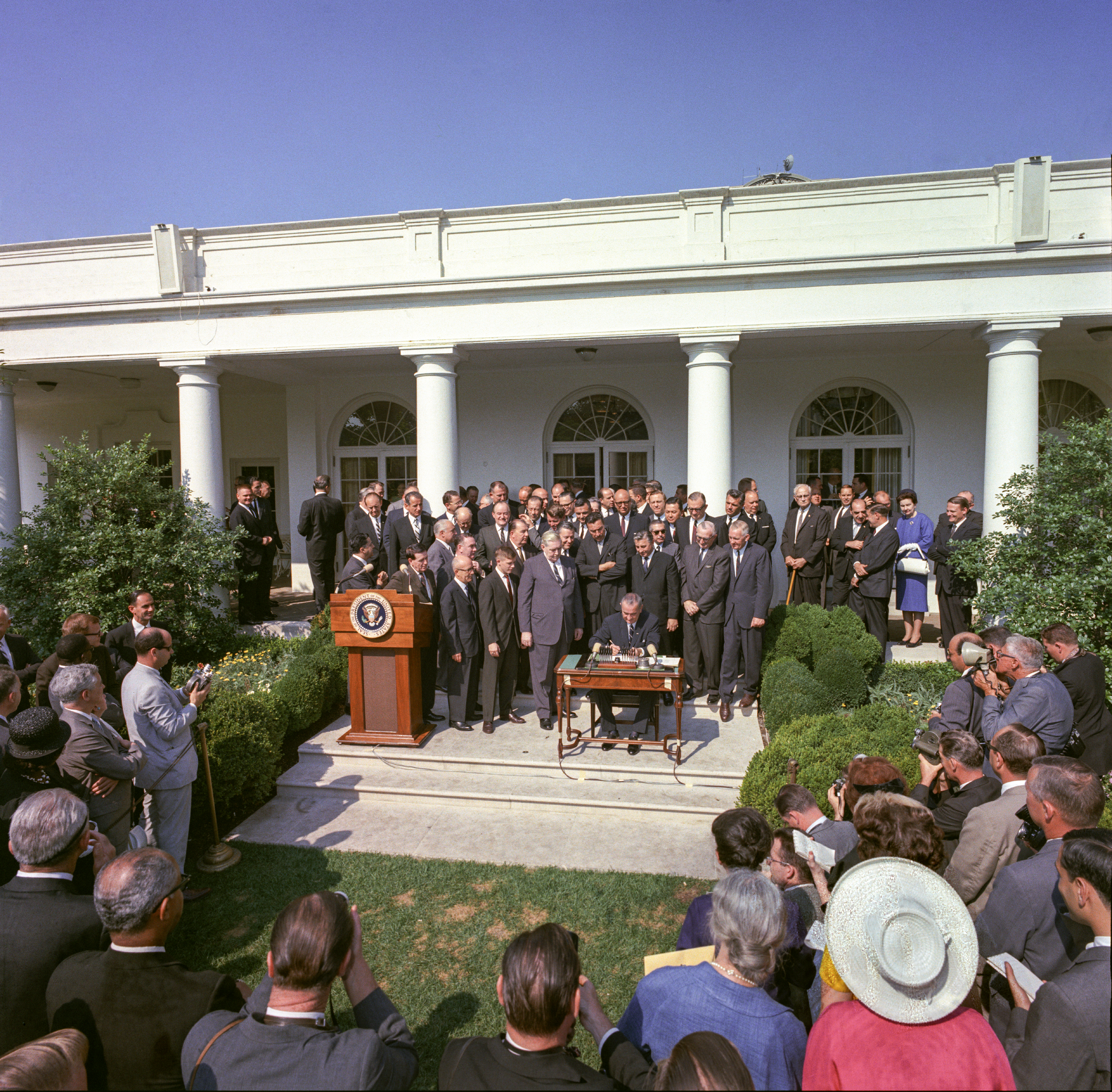
Signing of the Poverty Bill

In January 1964, President Johnson gave Sargent Shriver the task of developing a bill to wage the war against poverty in the United States. The bill was presented to Congress in March, 1964. It was introduced in the House by Representative Phil M. Landrum, (D Georgia), and in the Senate by Senator Pat McNamara, (D Michigan). In the Senate, the bill was debated for two days and then passed on July 23, 1964, with 61 Senators in favor, 34 opposed. In the House, the Senate-passed bill was debated for four days and passed by a vote of 226 to 185, on August 8, 1964. The debate and voting in both the House and Senate was highly partisan with Republicans questioning states' rights and southern Democrats the racial integration provisions (see Tables below). The Senate adopted the House-passed bill that same day and twelve days later on August 20, 1964, the bill was signed by President Johnson. The Economic Opportunity Act was announced by the president in his first State of the Union Address as the keystone of the War on Poverty.

=== Vote totals ===
Table 1 Senate Bill
Party	For	Against
Republicans	10	22
Northern Democrats	40	1
Southern Democrats	11	11
Total	61	34

Table 2 House Bill
Party	For	Against
Republicans	22	145
Northern Democrats	144	0
Southern Democrats	60	40
Total	226	185

== Major features ==
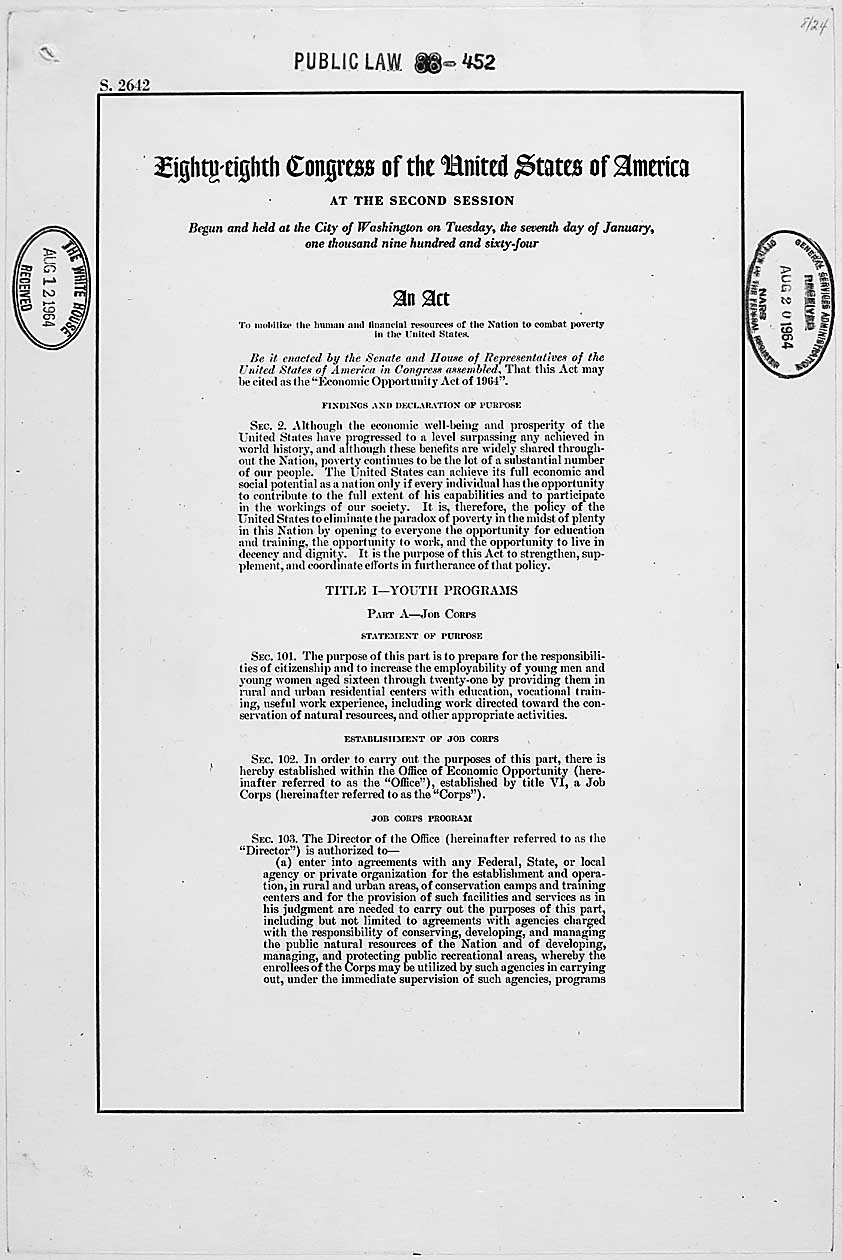
Economic Opportunity Act

The act included eleven major programs:

1. The Job Corps provides work, basic education, and training in separate residential centers for young men and young women, from ages sixteen to twenty-one.
2. Neighborhood Youth Corps provides work and training for young men and women, ages sixteen to twenty-one, from impoverished families and neighborhoods.
3. Work Study provides grants to colleges and universities for part-time employment of students from low-income families who need to earn money to pursue their education.
4. Urban and Rural Community Action provides financial and technical assistance to public and private nonprofit agencies for community action programs developed with "maximum feasible participation" of the poor and giving "promise of progress toward elimination of poverty."
5. Adult Basic Education provides grants to state educational agencies for programs of instruction for persons eighteen years and older whose inability to read and write English is an impediment to employment.
6. Voluntary Assistance for Needy Children establishes an information and coordination center to encourage voluntary assistance for deserving and needy children.
7. Loans to Rural Families provides loans not exceeding $2,500 that assist low income rural families in permanently increasing their income.
8. Assistance for Migrant Agricultural Employees provides assistance to state and local governments, public and private nonprofit agencies or individuals in operating programs to assist migratory workers and their families with basic needs.
9. Employment and Investment Incentives provides loans and guarantees, not in excess of $25,000 to a single borrower, for the benefit of very small businesses.
10. Work Experience provides payments for experimental, pilot, and demonstration projects to expand opportunities for work experience and needed training of persons who are unable to support or care for themselves or their families, including persons receiving public assistance.
11. Volunteers in Service to America (VISTA) recruits, selects, trains, and refers volunteers to state or local agencies or private nonprofit organizations to perform duties to combat poverty.

The legislation also authorized the Economic Opportunity Council, which led to the launch of smaller independent groups that worked with communities to establish better economic climates. Government took charge for providing a means to provide basic literacy to adults. The idea was not wealth distribution, but to provide poor families with a means to provide for their family to a decent standard of living.

One of the main provisions of the act was the federal government's authority to bypass states in sending funds directly to local governments. This was one of the ways the federal government was able to bypass the southern states that did not cooperate with federal law.

== Evaluation ==
The act was part of President Lyndon Johnson's War on Poverty, which sought to eliminate poverty which President Johnson saw as: "... it's wastage of resources and human lives...." The aim was to bring Americans closer, away from "the outskirts of hope." By 1966, the program was under scrutiny from Republicans. They pointed out the waste and inefficiency in local programs and Nixon pledged to "take the profit out of poverty." LBJ was proud of the progress he had made with the passage of his bill, including 9.1 million acres of forestry that was set for harvest, the creation of Medicare, and funding injected into state schools. Funding that was for his poverty legislation were diverted to the Vietnam War. In 1967, Congress directed the Government Accountability Office, then General Accounting Office, to review anti-poverty programs by the federal government. The conclusion was that programs such as Head Start were effective in providing for children, but the primary objective of parent participation was insufficient. Community Action Programs were behind administratively and underachieved given the amount of money designated. Overall, the GAO determined that the poverty programs were working at the time. While there is debate about the impact of the act, the fact is that poverty rate fell dramatically within 10 years of its passage. According to the US Census Bureau the poverty rate in America 1964 stood at 19.0%. By 1973 the poverty rate was 11.3%, according to the Census Bureau. Additionally, the drop in poverty is more dramatic depending on the measure used. The act was essentially repealed under the Ronald Reagan administration in 1981, although much of the main features still remain. The remaining pieces of social legislation are reconfigured and adjusted, such as Head Start, which is now under the U.S. Department of Health and Human Services, Administration for Children and Families, Office of Head Start. The Economic Opportunity Act of 1964 was replaced by The Community Services Block Grant (CSBG) which replaced the funding from direct funding to block grants with over 1200 plus community action agencies.
