= Athletics at the 1982 Central American and Caribbean Games – Results =

These are partial results of the athletics competition at the 1982 Central American and Caribbean Games which took place between 8 and 12 August 1982, at the Estadio Pedro Marrero in Havana, Cuba.

== Men's results ==
=== 100 metres ===
Heats – 8 August
Wind:
Heat 1: -1.4 m/s, Heat 2: -1.6 m/s, Heat 3: -0.6 m/s, Heat 4: -1.2 m/s

Rank	Heat	Name	Nationality	Time	Notes
1	1	Osvaldo Lara	Cuba	10.41	Q
4	1	Jesús Cabrera	Puerto Rico	10.61	q
1	2	Earle Laing	Jamaica	10.46	Q
1	3	Juan Núñez	Dominican Republic	10.41	Q
2	3	Christopher Brathwaite	Trinidad and Tobago	10.46	Q
5	3	Luis González	Puerto Rico	10.89	
1	4	Leandro Peñalver	Cuba	10.47	Q

Semifinals – 8 August
Wind:
Heat 1: -1.6 m/s, Heat 2: -0.9 m/s

Rank	Heat	Name	Nationality	Time	Notes
1	1	Osvaldo Lara	Cuba	10.34	Q
2	1	Christopher Brathwaite	Trinidad and Tobago	10.35	Q
3	1	Sammy Monsels	Suriname	10.46	Q
1	2	Leandro Peñalver	Cuba	10.30	Q
2	2	Juan Núñez	Dominican Republic	10.40	Q
3	2	Earle Laing	Jamaica	10.45	Q
5	2	Jesús Cabrera	Puerto Rico	10.62	
?	?	Dennis Malone	Suriname	10.8	

Final – 9 August

Wind: -2.4 m/s

Rank	Lane	Name	Nationality	Time	Notes
1st place, gold medalist(s)	3	Leandro Peñalver	Cuba	10.16	
2nd place, silver medalist(s)	4	Osvaldo Lara	Cuba	10.26	
3rd place, bronze medalist(s)	6	Juan Núñez	Dominican Republic	10.33	
4	5	Christopher Brathwaite	Trinidad and Tobago	10.38	
5	2	Earle Laing	Jamaica	10.43	
6	1	Neville Hodge	United States Virgin Islands	10.59	
7	7	Sammy Monsels	Suriname	10.61	
8	8	Gerardo Suero	Dominican Republic	10.66	

=== 200 metres ===
Heats – ? August

Rank	Heat	Name	Nationality	Time	Notes
4	2	Jesús Cabrera	Puerto Rico	21.51	q
5	3	Felipe Oliveras	Puerto Rico	21.89	

Semifinals – ? August

Rank	Heat	Name	Nationality	Time	Notes
6	2	Jesús Cabrera	Puerto Rico	21.53	

Final – 11 August
Wind: +0.6 m/s

Rank	Lane	Name	Nationality	Time	Notes
1st place, gold medalist(s)	6	Leandro Peñalver	Cuba	20.42	GR
2nd place, silver medalist(s)	3	Osvaldo Lara	Cuba	20.94	
3rd place, bronze medalist(s)	2	Juan Núñez	Dominican Republic	21.04	
4	4	Andrew Bruce	Trinidad and Tobago	21.14	
5	5	Héctor Daley	Panama	21.28	
6	8	Floyd Brown	Jamaica	21.39	
7	7	Ron Sobers	Trinidad and Tobago	21.51	
	1	Neville Hodge	United States Virgin Islands	DNS	

=== 400 metres ===
Heats – ? August

Rank	Heat	Name	Nationality	Time	Notes
7	1	José Valdés	Puerto Rico	48.68	

Semifinals – 8 August

Rank	Heat	Name	Nationality	Time	Notes
1	1	Bert Cameron	Jamaica	45.27	Q
2	1	Agustín Pavó	Cuba	45.96	Q
3	1	Eric Phillips	Venezuela	46.35	Q
1	2	Carlos Reyté	Cuba	46.43	Q

Final – 9 August

Rank	Lane	Name	Nationality	Time	Notes
1st place, gold medalist(s)	3	Bert Cameron	Jamaica	45.10	
2nd place, silver medalist(s)	4	Agustín Pavó	Cuba	45.87	
3rd place, bronze medalist(s)	6	Carlos Reyté	Cuba	46.34	
4	5	Eric Phillips	Venezuela	47.15	
5	1	Randy Wheatley	United States Virgin Islands	47.67	
6	2	Joseph Coombs	Trinidad and Tobago	48.36	
7	8	Michael Puckerin	Trinidad and Tobago	49.32	
	7	Héctor Daley	Panama	DNS	

=== 800 metres ===
Final – 11 August

Rank	Name	Nationality	Time	Notes
1st place, gold medalist(s)	Alberto Juantorena	Cuba	1:45.15	GR
2nd place, silver medalist(s)	William Wuycke	Venezuela	1:45.75	
3rd place, bronze medalist(s)	Bárbaro Serrano	Cuba	1:46.66	
4	Eric Phillips	Venezuela	1:48.05	
5	Oslen Barr	Guyana	1:50.45	
6	Ignacio Melecio	Mexico	1:50.73	
7	Conrad Francis	Grenada	1:51.15	
8	Ruthsel Martina	Netherlands Antilles	1:53.87	

=== 1500 metres ===
9 August

Rank	Name	Nationality	Time	Notes
1st place, gold medalist(s)	Eduardo Castro	Mexico	3:41.84	GR
2nd place, silver medalist(s)	Luis Medina	Cuba	3:41.92	
3rd place, bronze medalist(s)	Ignacio Melesio	Mexico	3:42.03	
4	Jorge Poll	Cuba	3:44.46	
5	Eduardo Navas	Venezuela	3:47.39	
6	Isidro Aular	Venezuela	3:52.73	
7	Augusto Fernández	Costa Rica	3:55.73	
8	Luis Munguía	Nicaragua	4:07.77	
9	Enoc Zamora	Nicaragua	4:08.26	
10	Windsor Bonne	Haiti	4:31.39	
	Conrad Francis	Grenada	DNS	

=== 5000 metres ===
12 August

Rank	Name	Nationality	Time	Notes
1st place, gold medalist(s)	Eduardo Castro	Mexico	14:11.05	
2nd place, silver medalist(s)	Luis Medina	Cuba	14:24.81	
3rd place, bronze medalist(s)	Lucirio Garrido	Venezuela	14:24.94	
4	Nabel Parra	Cuba	14:25.56	
5	César Santiago	Puerto Rico	14:41.04	
6	José Flores	Mexico	14:49.04	
7	Nestor Moreno	Puerto Rico	14:52.58	
8	William Aguirre	Nicaragua	15:16.44	
9	Jegney Barron	Suriname	16:03.92	
	Eduardo Navas	Venezuela	DNF	
	Freestone Roberts	United States Virgin Islands	DNS	

=== 10,000 metres ===
8 August

Rank	Name	Nationality	Time	Notes
1st place, gold medalist(s)	Aldo Allen	Cuba	30:13.12	
2nd place, silver medalist(s)	Enrique Aquino	Mexico	30:15.35	
3rd place, bronze medalist(s)	Gerardo Alcalá	Mexico	30:28.04	
4	José Zapata	Venezuela	30:46.24	
5	Nestor Moreno	Puerto Rico	30:57.32	
6	Nabel Parra	Cuba	31:31.57	
7	William Aguirre	Nicaragua	32:25.68	
8	Jegney Barron	Suriname	33:49.73	NR
9	Michel Lamote	Haiti	35:35.10	
10	Robert Desroses	Haiti	37:52.30	
	Freestone Roberts	United States Virgin Islands	DNS	

=== Marathon ===
12 August

Rank	Name	Nationality	Time	Notes
1st place, gold medalist(s)	Jorge González	Puerto Rico	2:26:40	
2nd place, silver medalist(s)	Radamés González	Cuba	2:28:12	
3rd place, bronze medalist(s)	Miguel Ángel Cruz	Mexico	2:30:37	
4	Luis Ruda	Venezuela	2:40:42	
5	Andrés Chávez	Cuba	2:42:27	
6	Pablo Dones	Puerto Rico	2:45:46	
7	Marcial Soto	Mexico	2:52:56	
8	Michel Lamote	Haiti	2:56:36	
9	Robert Desroses	Haiti	3:02:09	
10	Wallace Williams	United States Virgin Islands	3:05:39	
	Miguel Hernández	Venezuela	DNF	

=== 110 metres hurdles ===
9 August
Wind: -0.2 m/s

Rank	Lane	Name	Nationality	Time	Notes
1st place, gold medalist(s)	4	Alejandro Casañas	Cuba	13.38	GR
2nd place, silver medalist(s)	5	Juan Saborit	Cuba	13.91	
3rd place, bronze medalist(s)	2	Modesto Castillo	Dominican Republic	13.95	
4	3	Karl Smith	Jamaica	14.13	
5	6	Nelson Rodríguez	Venezuela	14.17	
6	7	Gary Bullard	Bahamas	14.51	
7	1	Guillermo Sánchez	Mexico	15.03	

=== 400 metres hurdles ===
11 August

Rank	Lane	Name	Nationality	Time	Notes
1st place, gold medalist(s)	2	Frank Montiéh	Cuba	50.64	
2nd place, silver medalist(s)	3	Jorge Batista	Cuba	50.98	
3rd place, bronze medalist(s)	6	Greg Rolle	Bahamas	51.18	
4	4	Karl Smith	Jamaica	51.25	
5	1	Wilfredo Santiago	Puerto Rico	51.80	
6	7	Pedro Beltre	Dominican Republic	52.10	
	5	Carlos Leal	Mexico	DNS	

=== 3000 metres steeplechase ===
10 August

Rank	Name	Nationality	Time	Notes
1st place, gold medalist(s)	José Cobo	Cuba	8:49.52	
2nd place, silver medalist(s)	Lucirio Garrido	Venezuela	8:52.50	
3rd place, bronze medalist(s)	Pedro Guibert	Cuba	8:58.08	
4	Daniel Landa	Mexico	8:59.23	
5	César Santiago	Puerto Rico	9:05.51	
6	Jesús Herrera	Mexico	9:09.05	
7	José Martínez	Venezuela	9:25.25	

=== 4 × 100 metres relay ===
Heats – ? August

Rank	Heat	Team	Name	Time	Notes
4	1	Puerto Rico	Luis González, José Valdez, Felipe Oliveras, Jesús Cabrera	40.78	q

Final – 12 August

Rank	Lane	Team	Name	Time	Notes
1st place, gold medalist(s)	3	Cuba	Osvaldo Lara, Alejandro Casañas, Leandro Peñalver, Juan Saborit	39.15	
2nd place, silver medalist(s)	5	Jamaica	Joseph Boyd, Earle Laing, Leroy Reid, Floyd Brown	39.94	
3rd place, bronze medalist(s)	2	Dominican Republic	Juan Contreras, Wilfredo Almonte, Juan Núñez, Gerardo Suero	40.11	
4	6	Venezuela	Ángel Andrades, Manuel Briseño, Hipólito Brown, Reinaldo Lizardi	40.15	
5	7	Puerto Rico	Luis González, José Valdez, Felipe Oliveras, Jesús Cabrera	40.77	
6	1	United States Virgin Islands	Ronald Russell, Neville Hodge, Randy Wheatley, Ulric Jackson	40.92	

=== 4 × 400 metres relay ===
12 August

Rank	Lane	Team	Name	Time	Notes
1st place, gold medalist(s)	6	Cuba	Agustín Pavó, Carlos Reyté, Roberto Ramos, Alberto Juantorena	3:03.59	GR
2nd place, silver medalist(s)	4	Jamaica	Floyd Brown, Mark Senior, Bert Cameron, Karl Smith	3:04.78	
3rd place, bronze medalist(s)	2	Trinidad and Tobago	Michael Puckerin, Joseph Coombs, Ali St. Louis, Andrew Bruce	3:08.20	
4	5	United States Virgin Islands	Neville Hodge, Ulric Jackson, Randy Wheatley, Raymond Stevens	3:10.98	
5	1	British Virgin Islands	Lindel Hodge, Jerry Molyneaux, Jean Greenaway, Guy Hill	3:13.99	
6	8	Nicaragua	Henry Larios, Franklin Almendariz, Luis Munguía, Roberto Gómez	3:20.64	
	7	Puerto Rico		DNS	
	3	Venezuela		DNS	

=== 20 kilometres walk ===
11 August

Rank	Name	Nationality	Time	Notes
1st place, gold medalist(s)	Ernesto Canto	Mexico	1:29:22	
2nd place, silver medalist(s)	Raúl González	Mexico	1:31:27	
3rd place, bronze medalist(s)	Alfredo Garrido	Cuba	1:39:00	
4	Wilmer Santiago	Puerto Rico	1:43:55	
5	David Félix	Puerto Rico	1:47:23	
6	Omar Guerrero	Venezuela	1:49:42	
	Rigoberto Medina	Cuba	DQ	
	Benjamín Queme	Guatemala	DQ	
	Mario Rodríguez	Panama	DQ	
	Carlos Ramones	Venezuela	DQ	

=== 50 kilometres walk ===
8 August

Rank	Name	Nationality	Time	Notes
1st place, gold medalist(s)	Félix Gómez	Mexico	4:05:03	GR
2nd place, silver medalist(s)	Raúl González	Mexico	4:10:34	
3rd place, bronze medalist(s)	David Castro	Cuba	4:43:53	
4	Anibal Pérez	Cuba	4:46:37	
5	Leonel Ramos	Panama	5:05:03	

=== High jump ===
9 August

Rank	Name	Nationality	1.95	2.00	2.08	2.11	2.14	2.17	2.21	2.25	2.30	Results	Notes
1st place, gold medalist(s)	Francisco Centelles	Cuba	–	–	–	o	–	o	o	o	xxx	2.25	GR
2nd place, silver medalist(s)	Steve Wray	Bahamas	–	–	–	xo	–	o	xxx			2.17	
3rd place, bronze medalist(s)	Clarence Saunders	Bermuda	–	–	o	o	xo	xo	xxx			2.17	
4	Carlos Acosta	Puerto Rico	–	–	–	–	o	–	xxx			2.14	
5	Freddy Mejía	Dominican Republic	o	–	xxo	o	xxx					2.11	
6	Richard Spencer	Cuba	–	–	o	xo	xxx					2.11	
7	Dennis Richards	Bahamas	–	o	–	xxo	xxx					2.11	

=== Pole vault ===
9 August

Rank	Name	Nationality	4.40	4.50	4.60	4.70	4.80	4.90	5.00	5.10	Results	Notes
1st place, gold medalist(s)	Rubén Camino	Cuba	–	–	–	–	o	o	o	xxx	5.00	=GR
2nd place, silver medalist(s)	José Echevarría	Cuba	–	–	–	–	o	o	xxo	xxx	5.00	=GR
3rd place, bronze medalist(s)	Miguel Escoto	Mexico	–	–	o	–	o	xo	xxx		4.90	
4	Edgardo Rivera	Puerto Rico	–	–	–	–	–	xxo	xxx		4.90	
5	Brian Morrissette	United States Virgin Islands	–	–	–	–	xxo	–	xxx		4.80	
6	Guillermo Sánchez	Mexico	o	o	o	xxx					4.60	
7	Carlos Zequeira	Puerto Rico	–	xo	o	xxx					4.60	

=== Long jump ===
11 August

Rank	Name	Nationality	#1	#2	#3	#4	#5	#6	Results	Notes
1st place, gold medalist(s)	Delroy Poyser	Jamaica	7.54	7.62	7.90	7.75	x	7.34	7.90	GR
2nd place, silver medalist(s)	Wilfredo Almonte	Dominican Republic	7.45	7.59	7.69	7.82	x	x	7.82	
3rd place, bronze medalist(s)	Steve Hanna	Bahamas	7.33	6.99	7.42	7.50	7.70	7.80	7.80	
4	Ubaldo Duany	Cuba	7.78	7.62	x	7.69	7.60	7.62	7.78	
5	Joey Wells	Bahamas	7.57	7.45	6.68	7.45	7.50	7.55	7.57	
6	Alejandro Herrera	Cuba	7.46	6.80	7.48	7.50	x	7.57	7.57	
7	José Maldonado	Puerto Rico	7.33	x	6.94	7.10	7.19	7.19	7.33	
8	Ray Quiñones	Puerto Rico	x	x	6.87				6.87	
9	Guy Hill	British Virgin Islands	x	6.83					6.83	

=== Triple jump ===
12 August

Rank	Name	Nationality	#1	#2	#3	#4	#5	#6	Results	Notes
1st place, gold medalist(s)	Steve Hanna	Bahamas	16.49	x	16.73	x	x	x	16.73	
2nd place, silver medalist(s)	Lázaro Betancourt	Cuba	16.35	16.64	16.32	16.05	16.32	16.11	16.64	
3rd place, bronze medalist(s)	Jorge Reyna	Cuba	x	16.61	x	16.24	16.59	16.49	16.61	
4	Norbert Elliott	Bahamas	15.66	16.34	x	15.76	15.98	16.10	16.34	
5	Delroy Poyser	Jamaica	x	x	15.29	15.92	x	x	15.92	
6	Ernesto Torres	Puerto Rico	15.54	15.09	15.31	15.62	x	x	15.62	
7	Henry Inniss	Barbados	13.87	15.41	x	15.17w	15.30	15.11	15.41	
8	José Salazar	Venezuela	x	x	15.21	x	–	–	15.21	
9	Edgard Blanco	Puerto Rico	14.50	14.36	14.97				14.97	
	Wilfredo Almonte	Dominican Republic							DNS	

=== Shot put ===
10 August

Rank	Name	Nationality	#1	#2	#3	#4	#5	#6	Results	Notes
1st place, gold medalist(s)	Luis Delís	Cuba	18.61	18.88	x	x	x	x	18.88	GR
2nd place, silver medalist(s)	Radai Mendoza	Puerto Rico	15.20	15.34	16.21	x	x	15.10	16.21	
3rd place, bronze medalist(s)	Paul Ruiz	Cuba	x	16.06	x	x	16.14	x	16.14	
4	William Romero	Venezuela	15.38	15.77	15.61	15.94	15.86	16.07	16.07	
5	Bradley Cooper	Bahamas	13.49	15.25	15.81	15.91	15.72	14.69	15.91	
6	James Dedier	Trinidad and Tobago	13.84	13.59	14.08	14.61	14.26	14.46	14.61	
7	Wilfredo Jaimes	Venezuela	13.91	x	x	14.30	14.34	13.98	14.34	
	Trevor Modeste	Grenada							DNS	

=== Discus throw ===
8 August

Rank	Name	Nationality	#1	#2	#3	#4	#5	#6	Results	Notes
1st place, gold medalist(s)	Luis Delís	Cuba	62.50	70.20	67.12	x	68.90	x	70.20	GR
2nd place, silver medalist(s)	Bradley Cooper	Bahamas	62.52	63.72	66.72	x	61.80	63.84	66.72	
3rd place, bronze medalist(s)	Juan Martínez	Cuba	58.44	58.62	x	62.82	x	x	62.82	
4	James Dedier	Trinidad and Tobago	49.44	48.78	48.90	53.48	49.60	47.04	53.48	
5	Miguel Cruz	Puerto Rico	x	45.10	45.94	49.18	x	48.52	49.18	
6	Luis Palacios	Venezuela	46.08	46.20	46.18	45.96	43.32	42.74	46.20	
7	Wilfredo Jaimes	Venezuela	x	x	42.64	44.86	45.12	43.12	45.12	
8	Cresencio Dromond	Netherlands Antilles	37.12	37.50	37.66	x	37.06	34.86	37.66	

=== Hammer throw ===
11 August

Rank	Name	Nationality	#1	#2	#3	#4	#5	#6	Results	Notes
1st place, gold medalist(s)	Genovevo Morejón	Cuba	66.48	67.10	65.68	66.84	x	66.20	67.10	
2nd place, silver medalist(s)	Alfredo Luis	Cuba	65.54	61.44	61.14	64.20	x	65.14	66.14	
3rd place, bronze medalist(s)	Andrés Polemil	Dominican Republic	55.20	54.70	56.14	54.00	55.50	x	56.14	
4	Luis Martínez	Puerto Rico	54.56	53.96	x	x	54.30	x	54.56	
5	Rey David Santiago	Puerto Rico	50.20	52.26	47.70	49.44	50.72	51.44	52.26	
6	Gerardo Díaz	Mexico	53.44	x	53.72	50.58	x	x	53.72	

=== Javelin throw ===
10 August – Old model

Rank	Name	Nationality	#1	#2	#3	#4	#5	#6	Results	Notes
1st place, gold medalist(s)	Dionisio Quintana	Cuba	74.06	78.78	78.96	x	x	82.40	82.40	GR
2nd place, silver medalist(s)	Amado Morales	Puerto Rico	79.36	73.44	72.10	78.06	x	x	79.36	
3rd place, bronze medalist(s)	Antonio González	Cuba	74.86	74.64	x	x	74.44	73.50	74.86	
4	Juan de la Garza	Mexico	x	66.06	71.10	69.98	x	69.94	71.10	
5	Trevor Modeste	Grenada	52.64	57.84	66.08	x	68.78	x	68.78	
6	Godfrey Llenos	Barbados	64.42	68.74	60.48	x	x	x	68.74	
7	Juan Cortés	Nicaragua	63.18	62.78	66.50	66.82	63.14	60.82	66.82	
8	Cresencio Dromond	Netherlands Antilles	x	x	51.98	x	x	x	51.98	
	Eustacio de León	Panama							DNS	

=== Decathlon ===
11–12 August

The highest mark recorded in each event is highlighted in yellow

Rank	Athlete	Nationality	100m	LJ	SP	HJ	400m	110m H	DT	PV	JT	1500m	Points	Notes
1st place, gold medalist(s)	Liston Bochette	Puerto Rico	11.42	6.63	12.85	1.94	50.16	15.76	40.72	4.73	58.48	4:53.81	7348	
2nd place, silver medalist(s)	Guillermo Sánchez	Mexico	11.40	6.75	11.59	1.85	49.46	15.26	40.46	4.40	59.70	4:34.52	7345	
3rd place, bronze medalist(s)	Carlos Palacios	Cuba	11.16	6.71	12.96	1.85	51.06	15.10	39.90	4.30	54.00	4:48.26	7236	
4	Pedro Herrera	Cuba	11.75	6.56	11.35	1.91	51.66	16.59	38.04	4.20	65.86	4:25.67	7079	
5	Sydney Cartwright	Bahamas	11.32	6.38	11.37	1.79	51.06	15.80	38.64	3.70	51.60	4:45.19	6704	
6	Freddy Aberdeen	Venezuela	11.25	6.69	10.67	1.88	50.56	15.50	35.16	3.50	42.16	4:35.69	6670	
	Juan Ríos	Venezuela	11.30	6.90	12.39	1.79	51.46	16.25	37.70	?	DNS	–	DNF	
	Ray Quiñones	Puerto Rico	11.37	7.12	10.77	1.79	51.81	DNS	–	–	–	–	DNF	

== Women's results ==
=== 100 metres ===
Heats – ? August

Rank	Heat	Name	Nationality	Time	Notes
3	1	Nilsa Paris	Puerto Rico	12.00	Q

Semifinals – ? August

Rank	Heat	Name	Nationality	Time	Notes
5	2	Nilsa Paris	Puerto Rico	12.07	

Final – Final – 9 August
Wind: -1.9 m/s

Rank	Lane	Name	Nationality	Time	Notes
1st place, gold medalist(s)	5	Luisa Ferrer	Cuba	11.55	
2nd place, silver medalist(s)	4	Janice Bernard	Trinidad and Tobago	11.57	
3rd place, bronze medalist(s)	3	Marie Lande Mathieu	Puerto Rico	11.63	
4	2	Shonel Ferguson	Bahamas	11.69	
5	6	Pauline Davis	Bahamas	11.95	
6	8	Ester Petitón	Cuba	12.01	
7	7	Evelyn Farrell	Netherlands Antilles	12.26	
	1	Yaneris Guerra	Venezuela	DNS	

=== 200 metres ===
Heats – ? August

Rank	Heat	Name	Nationality	Time	Notes
3	1	Nilsa Paris	Puerto Rico	24.83	Q

Final – 11 August
Wind: +1.2 m/s

Rank	Lane	Name	Nationality	Time	Notes
1st place, gold medalist(s)	5	Luisa Ferrer	Cuba	23.44	
2nd place, silver medalist(s)	4	Angela Williams	Trinidad and Tobago	23.75	
3rd place, bronze medalist(s)	3	Marie Lande Mathieu	Puerto Rico	23.83	
4	2	Pauline Davis	Bahamas	24.01	
5	6	Janice Bernard	Trinidad and Tobago	24.08	
6	7	Nilsa París	Puerto Rico	24.64	
7	1	Ester Petitón	Cuba	24.77	
8	8	Zonia Meigham	Guatemala	25.34	

=== 400 metres ===
Final – 9 August

Rank	Lane	Name	Nationality	Time	Notes
1st place, gold medalist(s)	4	June Griffith	Guyana	51.89	
2nd place, silver medalist(s)	5	Mercedes Álvarez	Cuba	52.32	
3rd place, bronze medalist(s)	6	Cathy Rattray	Jamaica	52.39	
4	3	Ana Fidelia Quirot	Cuba	52.61	
5	7	Yolande Small	Trinidad and Tobago	54.59	
6	1	Denise Plantz	Netherlands Antilles	54.89	
7	8	Elsa Antúnez	Venezuela	54.89	
	2	Jacqueline Pusey	Jamaica	DNS	

=== 800 metres ===
Final – 11 August

Rank	Name	Nationality	Time	Notes
1st place, gold medalist(s)	Nery McKeen	Cuba	2:04.22	
2nd place, silver medalist(s)	Angelita Lind	Puerto Rico	2:04.24	
3rd place, bronze medalist(s)	María Ribeaux	Cuba	2:04.47	
4	Cathy Rattray	Jamaica	2:06.68	
5	Virginia Davis	Venezuela	2:11.43	
6	Adriana Marchena	Venezuela	2:12.33	
7	Marcelina Reinoso	Dominican Republic	2:20.10	
8	Susana Herrera	Mexico	2:24.40	

=== 1500 metres ===
9 August

Rank	Name	Nationality	Time	Notes
1st place, gold medalist(s)	Angelita Lind	Puerto Rico	4:25.94	
2nd place, silver medalist(s)	Sergia Martínez	Cuba	4:26.69	
3rd place, bronze medalist(s)	Alicia Diffourt	Cuba	4:27.96	
4	Marisela de Díaz	Venezuela	4:29.92	
5	Jovita Guerrero	Mexico	4:34.71	
6	Susana Herrera	Mexico	4:38.81	
7	Elida Rodríguez	Venezuela	4:39.78	
8	María Ocón	Nicaragua	5:09.09	

=== 3000 metres ===
12 August

Rank	Name	Nationality	Time	Notes
1st place, gold medalist(s)	Sergia Martínez	Cuba	9:37.32	GR
2nd place, silver medalist(s)	Marisela Rivero	Venezuela	9:38.40	
3rd place, bronze medalist(s)	María Cuesta	Cuba	9:41.66	
4	Genoveva Domínguez	Mexico	9:47.28	
5	Elida Rodríguez	Venezuela	9:48.98	
6	Maricela Hurtado	Mexico	9:49.17	
7	Beneranda Ávila	Dominican Republic	9:53.59	
8	María Ocón	Nicaragua	11:17.20	
	Angelita Lind	Puerto Rico	DNS	

=== 100 metres hurdles ===
Final – 8 August
Wind: -1.9 m/s

Rank	Lane	Name	Nationality	Time	Notes
1st place, gold medalist(s)	6	Grisel Machado	Cuba	13.18	GR
2nd place, silver medalist(s)	5	Marisela Peralta	Dominican Republic	14.07	
3rd place, bronze medalist(s)	8	June Caddle	Barbados	14.08	
4	2	Alina Bartelemy	Cuba	14.09	
5	7	Shonel Ferguson	Bahamas	14.44	
6	4	Margaret de Jesús	Puerto Rico	14.51	
7	3	Anthea Johnson	Jamaica	14.79	
8	1	Silvia Corvera	Mexico	15.07	

=== 400 metres hurdles ===
Heats – ? August

Rank	Heat	Name	Nationality	Time	Notes
2	1	Stephanie Vega	Puerto Rico	59.06	Q
2	2	Margaret de Jesús	Puerto Rico	1:02.47	Q

Final – 10 August

Rank	Lane	Name	Nationality	Time	Notes
1st place, gold medalist(s)	3	Sandra Farmer	Jamaica	58.15	GR
2nd place, silver medalist(s)	5	Mercedes Mesa	Cuba	58.65	
3rd place, bronze medalist(s)	4	Stephanie Vega	Puerto Rico	59.11	
4	2	Felicia Candelario	Dominican Republic	59.14	
5	7	Divina Estrella	Dominican Republic	1:00.16	
6	6	Alma Vázquez	Mexico	1:01.17	
7	1	Margaret de Jesús	Puerto Rico	1:02.74	
8	8	Sandra Taváres	Mexico	1:03.24	

=== 4 × 100 metres relay ===
Heats – 12 August

Rank	Heat	Team	Name	Time	Notes
3	1	Puerto Rico	Marie Lande Mathieu, Mayra Pacheco, Cinthia Guadalupe, Nilsa París	47.27	Q

Final – 12 August

Rank	Lane	Team	Name	Time	Notes
1st place, gold medalist(s)	3	Trinidad and Tobago	Gillian Forde, Maxime McMillan, Angela Williams, Janice Bernard	44.86	
2nd place, silver medalist(s)	4	Jamaica	Verónica Findlay, Cathy Rattray, Anthea Johnson, Jacqueline Pusey	45.77	
3rd place, bronze medalist(s)	5	Cuba	Luisa Ferrer, Idania Pino, Ester Petitón, Grisel Machado	45.85	
4	1	Puerto Rico	Marie Lande Mathieu, Mayra Pacheco, Cinthia Guadalupe, Nilsa París	46.71	
5	2	Dominican Republic	Divina Estrella, Felicia Candelario, Marisela Peralta, Iris Sanders	46.99	
6	7	Venezuela	Yaneris Guerra, Belkis Subero, Berzaida Guerra, Glenis Báez	47.06	
7	6	Mexico	Emilia Lenk, Alejandra Flores, Gabriela Romero, Alma Vázquez	47.41	
	8	Guatemala		DNS	

=== 4 × 400 metres relay ===
12 August

Rank	Lane	Team	Name	Time	Notes
1st place, gold medalist(s)	7	Cuba	Mercedes Álvarez, Ana Fidelia Quirot, Mercedes Mesa, Nery McKeen	3:35.22	
2nd place, silver medalist(s)	2	Puerto Rico	Nilsa París, Stephanie Vega, Margaret de Jesús, Marie Lande Mathieu	3:36.52	
3rd place, bronze medalist(s)	3	Jamaica	Jacqueline Pusey, Cathy Rattray, Sandra Farmer, Anthea Johnson	3:37.86	
4	5	Trinidad and Tobago	Dawn Douglas, Yolande Small, Maxime McMillan, Annatouchur Kingland	3:41.02	
5	1	Dominican Republic	Divina Estrella, Iris Sanders, Marcelina Reinoso, Felicia Candelario	3:45.16	
6	4	Venezuela	Elsa Antúnez, Adriana Marchena, Virginia Davis, Janeth Carvajal	3:46.11	
7	6	Mexico	Susana Herrera, Jovita Guerrero, Sandra Taváres, Alma Vázquez	3:58.91	
8	8	United States Virgin Islands	Denise Muller, Claudia Hodge, Iyichia Petrus, Christine Lewis	4:04.75	

=== High jump ===
12 August

Rank	Name	Nationality	1.50	1.55	1.60	1.65	1.70	1.75	1.78	1.81	1.84	1.86	1.90	1.93	Results	Notes
1st place, gold medalist(s)	Silvia Costa	Cuba	–	–	–	–	–	o	–	o	–	xo	xxo	xxx	1.90	GR
2nd place, silver medalist(s)	Ángela Carbonell	Cuba	–	–	–	o	o	o	xo	xxo	xxx				1.81	
3rd place, bronze medalist(s)	Iraima Parra	Venezuela	–	–	o	o	xxo	xxo	o	xxx					1.78	
4	Sharon Rose	Bahamas	–	–	–	o	o	xxo	xo	xxx					1.78	
5	Amalia Montes	Mexico	–	–	–	o	o	xxx							1.70	
6	Jenille Kelly	Trinidad and Tobago	o	o	o	xo	xxx								1.65	
7	Jacqueline Austin	Jamaica	o	–	o	xxo	xx–	x							1.65	
8	Ana María Hidalgo	Puerto Rico	–	–	o	xxx									1.60	

=== Long jump ===
10 August

Rank	Name	Nationality	#1	#2	#3	#4	#5	#6	Results	Notes
1st place, gold medalist(s)	Eloína Echevarría	Cuba	6.34w	6.50	6.53	6.31	x	6.26	6.53	GR
2nd place, silver medalist(s)	Shonel Ferguson	Bahamas	6.47	6.10	6.37	x	6.33	6.03	6.47	
3rd place, bronze medalist(s)	Madeline de Jesús	Puerto Rico	6.06	6.47	6.12	6.22	6.23w	6.29	6.47	
4	Ana Alexander	Cuba	5.85	6.20	6.04	6.06	6.21	6.12	6.21	
5	Gabriela Romero	Mexico	x	5.91	x	5.60	5.89	5.72w	5.91	
6	Tania Sangronis	Venezuela	5.63	x	5.87	x	x	5.69w	5.87	
7	Nancy Guevara	Venezuela	5.71	5.80	5.67	5.83	5.78	5.78	5.83	
8	Emilia Lenk	Mexico	5.64	5.64	5.62	5.45	5.81	5.53	5.81	
9	Euphemia Huggins	Trinidad and Tobago	5.39	5.49	5.50				5.50	
10	Digna Grigoria	Netherlands Antilles	5.34	x	4.65				5.34	
11	Cinthia Guadalupe	Puerto Rico	4.84	4.46	x				4.84	

=== Shot put ===
12 August

Rank	Name	Nationality	#1	#2	#3	#4	#5	#6	Results	Notes
1st place, gold medalist(s)	María Elena Sarría	Cuba	19.36	18.80	x	19.05	x	x	19.36	GR
2nd place, silver medalist(s)	Rosa Fernández	Cuba	16.83	17.22	17.28	17.01	17.41	17.54	17.54	
3rd place, bronze medalist(s)	Luz Bohórquez	Venezuela	13.09	13.34	13.11	12.50	13.63	12.71	13.63	
4	Laverne Eve	Bahamas	13.22	12.97	13.48	13.33	13.43	13.29	13.48	
5	Ángela Omier	Nicaragua	10.96	x	x	12.78	x	11.95	12.78	
6	Linette Antoine	Bahamas	12.64	x	11.92	12.39	12.42	12.51	12.64	
7	Judy Rivera	Puerto Rico	11.96	12.40	x	12.42	11.76	x	12.42	
8	María Victoria López	Puerto Rico	11.82	12.41	x	12.28	12.03	11.83	12.41	

=== Discus throw ===
9 August

Rank	Name	Nationality	#1	#2	#3	#4	#5	#6	Results	Notes
1st place, gold medalist(s)	María Cristina Betancourt	Cuba	63.76	61.90	63.48	x	60.26	61.58	63.76	GR
2nd place, silver medalist(s)	Carmen Romero	Cuba	61.98	58.84	57.50	x	x	61.36	61.98	
3rd place, bronze medalist(s)	Yunaira Piña	Venezuela	46.70	46.72	46.85	43.72	46.86	43.36	46.86	
4	Laverne Eve	Bahamas	42.72	45.26	x	38.72	42.92	x	45.26	
5	Laura Aguinaga	Mexico	41.50	42.82	x	x	40.70	39.96	42.82	
6	Elena Cajigas	Puerto Rico	x	34.30	38.68	42.80	41.56	41.26	42.80	
7	Linette Antoine	Bahamas	x	31.72	x	x	37.00	x	37.00	
8	Sonia Smith	Bermuda	33.64	31.64	x	x	34.22	34.06	34.22	

=== Javelin throw ===
8 August

Rank	Name	Nationality	#1	#2	#3	#4	#5	#6	Results	Notes
1st place, gold medalist(s)	María Caridad Colón	Cuba	61.82	58.60	x	59.96	62.80	62.64	62.80	
2nd place, silver medalist(s)	Mayra Vila	Cuba	52.72	x	54.46	60.22	53.28	57.88	60.22	
3rd place, bronze medalist(s)	Marieta Riera	Venezuela	50.64	46.76	51.50	49.40	50.86	49.64	51.50	
4	Yunaira Piña	Venezuela	39.94	x	46.42	45.64	45.32	49.18	49.18	
5	Sonia Smith	Bermuda	48.12	39.62	49.06	45.06	47.34	42.24	49.06	
6	Laverne Eve	Bahamas	43.28	41.94	47.64	47.74	42.30	44.26	47.74	
7	Diana Rodríguez	Puerto Rico	45.18	46.10	x	x	44.14	45.10	46.10	
8	Teresa Sánchez	Nicaragua	41.76	40.14	37.58	x	x	x	41.76	

=== Heptathlon ===
8–9 August

The highest mark recorded in each event is highlighted in yellow

Rank	Name	Nationality	100m H	HJ	SP	200m	LJ	JT	800m	Points	Notes
1st place, gold medalist(s)	Elida Aveillé	Cuba	13.99	1.68	11.93	24.96	6.03	36.04	2:35.34	5579	GR
2nd place, silver medalist(s)	Victoria Despaigne	Cuba	14.79	1.68	9.45	26.68	5.75	32.84	2:21.79	5210	
3rd place, bronze medalist(s)	Leyda Castro	Dominican Republic	14.91	1.55	9.90	25.50	5.45	38.96	2:30.52	5123	
4	Marisela Peralta	Dominican Republic	14.36	1.60	10.52	26.04	5.83	32.22	2:46.77	5070	
5	Jennifer Swanston	Barbados	16.03	1.60	10.69	27.58	5.35	33.18	2:25.16	4892	
6	Alma Preciado	Mexico	15.12	1.55	9.40	26.60	5.42	24.84	2:37.08	4654	
7	Emy González	Venezuela	16.10	1.50	9.14	26.34	5.23	22.96	2:33.77	4451	
	Alix Castillo	Venezuela	15.55	1.60	10.04	27.69	5.07	31.84	DNS	DNF	
