= Athletics at the 1979 Pan American Games – Women's 4 × 100 metres relay =

Women's 4 × 100 metres relay at the 1979 Pan American Games
- Venue: Estadio Sixto Escobar
- Dates: 14 July
- Winning time: 43.30

Medalists
Gold medal	Valerie Brisco, Chandra Cheeseborough, Karen Hawkins, Brenda Morehead	United States
Silver medal	Rosie Allwood, Carmetta Drummond, Leleith Hodges, Merlene Ottey	Jamaica
Bronze medal	Silvia Chivás, Eloína Echevarría, Isabel Taylor, Marta Zulueta	Cuba

The women's 4 × 100 metres relay competition of the athletics events at the 1979 Pan American Games took place on 14 July at the Estadio Sixto Escobar. The defending Pan American Games champion was the United States team.

== Records ==
Prior to this competition, the existing world and Pan American Games records were as follows:

World record	East Germany	42.10	Karl-Marx-Stadt, East Germany	June 10, 1979
Pan American Games record	United States	42.90	Mexico City, Mexico	1975

== Results ==
All times are in seconds.

KEY:	WR	World Record	GR	Pan American Record

=== Final ===
Rank	Nation	Competitors	Time	Notes
1st place, gold medalist(s)	United States	Valerie Brisco, Karen Hawkins, Chandra Cheeseborough, Brenda Morehead	43.30	
2nd place, silver medalist(s)	Jamaica	Leleith Hodges, Rosie Allwood, Carmetta Drummond, Merlene Ottey	44.18	
3rd place, bronze medalist(s)	Cuba	Marta Zulueta, Silvia Chivás, Isabel Taylor, Eloína Echevarría	46.26	
4	Brazil	Maria Luísa Betioli, Sueli Machado, Olga Verissimo, Sheila de Oliveira	46.98	
5	Dominican Republic	Divina Estrella, Marisela Peralta, Felicia Candelario, Tereza Almánzar	47.25	
	Puerto Rico	Margaret de Jesús, Madeline de Jesús, Georgina López, Nilsa París	DQ	
