= 1981 Central American and Caribbean Championships in Athletics =

- Dates: 10–12 July
- Host city: Santo Domingo, Dominican Republic
- Venue: Estadio Olímpico Juan Pablo Duarte

The 1981 Central American and Caribbean Championships in Athletics were held at the Estadio Olímpico Juan Pablo Duarte in Santo Domingo, Dominican Republic between 10–12 July.

== Medal summary ==
=== Men's events ===
Event	Gold		Silver		Bronze	
100 metres	Colin Bradford; Jamaica	10.30	Silvio Leonard; Cuba	10.34	Juan Núñez; Dominican Republic	10.47
200 metres	Juan Núñez; Dominican Republic	20.82	Don Quarrie; Jamaica	20.93	Héctor Daley; Panama	20.96
400 metres	Bert Cameron; Jamaica	45.05 CR	Héctor Daley; Panama	45.96	Alfred Browne; Antigua and Barbuda	46.68
800 metres	Alberto Juantorena; Cuba	1:47.59	Bárbaro Serrano; Cuba	1:48.08	Francisco Meléndez; Puerto Rico	1:48.35
1500 metres	Eduardo Castro; Mexico	3:43.30 CR	Ignacio Melesio; Mexico	2:43.40	Luis Medina; Cuba	3:44.10
5000 metres	Eduardo Castro; Mexico	14:08.88	Silvio Salazar; Colombia	14:12.06	Jacinto Navarrete; Colombia	14:12.33
10,000 metres	Silvio Salazar; Colombia	29:48.13 CR	Aldo Allen; Cuba	30:18.16	Héctor Díaz; Puerto Rico	30:22.06
Marathon	Radamés González; Cuba	2:23:15 CR	Jorge González; Puerto Rico	2:30:31	Manuel García; Mexico	2:31:02
110 metres hurdles	Alejandro Casañas; Cuba	13.85	Karl Smith; Jamaica	13.94	Modesto Castillo; Dominican Republic	14.20
400 metres hurdles	Jorge Batista; Cuba	50.58 CR	Frank Montiéh; Cuba	50.59	Greg Rolle; Bahamas	51.15
3000 metres steeplechase	Daniel Londa; Mexico	8:48.50 CR	Francisco Silva; Mexico	8:50.35	José Cobo; Cuba	8:53.97
4 × 100 metres relay	Jamaica; Leroy Reid; Colin Bradford; Don Quarrie; Floyd Brown	39.30	Trinidad and Tobago; Andrew Bruce; Scott Ferguson; Christopher Brathwaite; Ephraim Serrette	39.95	Cuba; Osvaldo Lara; Alejandro Casañas; Silvio Leonard; Tomás González	39.96
4 × 400 metres relay	Jamaica; Floyd Brown; Colin Bradford; Carl Maylor; Bert Cameron	3:06.95	Barbados	3:07.73	Cuba; Lázaro Martínez; Carlos Reyté; Frank Montiéh; Jorge Batista	3:08.34
20 km road walk	Félix Gómez; Mexico	1:30:12	Raúl González; Mexico	1:34:10	Querubín Moreno; Colombia	1:37:01
High jump	Francisco Centelles; Cuba	2.22	Clarence Saunders; Bermuda	2.22	Jorge Alfaro; Cuba	2.18
Pole vault	Rubén Camino; Cuba	5.00	Aurelio Falls; Cuba	4.70	Edgardo Rivera; Puerto Rico	4.60
Long jump	Ubaldo Duany; Cuba	7.76	David Giralt; Cuba	7.74	Salomón Rowe; Guatemala	7.60
Triple jump	Steve Hanna; Bahamas	16.76 CR	Alejandro Herrera; Cuba	16.29	Ernesto Torres; Puerto Rico	15.80
Shot put	Luis Delís; Cuba	19.36 CR	Radai Mendoza; Puerto Rico	17.19	Paul Ruiz; Cuba	16.40
Discus throw	Luis Delís; Cuba	64.38 CR	Bradley Cooper; Bahamas	62.32	Raúl Calderón; Cuba	55.42
Hammer throw	Alfredo Guillot; Cuba	58.34	Gerardo Díaz; Mexico	54.06	Ángel Cabrera; Puerto Rico	54.06
Javelin throw	Reinaldo Patterson; Cuba	75.28	Dionisio Quintana; Cuba	75.18	Juan de la Garza; Mexico	72.70
Decathlon	Rigoberto Salazar; Cuba	7181	Pedro Herrera; Cuba	6861	Sidney Cartwright; Bahamas	6500

=== Women's events ===
Event	Gold		Silver		Bronze	
100 metres	Lelieth Hodges; Jamaica	11.38 CR	Marie Lande Mathieu; Puerto Rico	11.64	Luisa Ferrer; Cuba	11.71
200 metres	Jackie Pusey; Jamaica	23.35 CR	Luisa Ferrer; Cuba	23.50	Eucaris Caicedo; Colombia	24.15
400 metres	Jackie Pusey; Jamaica	52.62 CR	Mercedes Álvarez; Cuba	53.51	Eucaris Caicedo; Colombia	53.93
800 metres	Angelita Lind; Puerto Rico	2:04.69 CR	Nery McKeen; Cuba	2:07.13	Whelma Colebrooke; Bahamas	2:09.20
1500 metres	Sergia Martínez; Cuba	4:26.72	Angelita Lind; Puerto Rico	4:26.83	Eloína Kerr; Cuba	4:33.23
3000 metres	Sergia Martínez; Cuba	9:47.26 CR	Merernette Bean; Bermuda	9:48.65 NR	Debora Medina; Colombia	9:53.59
100 metres hurdles	Grisel Machado; Cuba	13.72	Elida Aveillé; Cuba	14.07	Marisela Peralta; Dominican Republic	14.09
400 metres hurdles	Mercedes Mesa; Cuba	57.86 CR	Sandra Farmer; Jamaica	58.76	Felicia Candelario; Dominican Republic	59.66
4 × 100 metres relay	Jamaica; Lelieth Hodges; Dorothy Scott; Janet Burke; Jackie Pusey	44.62 CR	Cuba; Luisa Ferrer; Grisel Machado; Mercedes Mesa; Grisel Delis	45.79	Bahamas; Eldece Clarke-Lewis; Shonel Ferguson; Debbie Greene; Mary Ann Higgs	45.85
4 × 400 metres relay	Cuba; Beatriz Castillo; Ana Fidelia Quirot; Mercedes Álvarez; Mercedes Mesa	3:37.90	Jamaica; Jacqueline Pusey; Cathy Rattray; Norma Lee Murray; Fredericka Wright	3:40.00	Dominican Republic; Felicia Candelario; Divina Estrella; Iris Sanders; Herminia García	3:49.62
High jump	Silvia Costa; Cuba	1.85 CR	Sharon Rose; Bahamas	1.78	Angela Carbonell; Cuba	1.75
Long jump	Shonel Ferguson; Bahamas	6.43 CR	Eloína Echevarría; Cuba	6.29	Madeline de Jesús; Puerto Rico	6.20
Shot put	María Elena Sarría; Cuba	18.28 CR	Rosa Fernández; Cuba	15.35	Laverne Eve; Bahamas	13.32
Discus throw	María Cristina Betancourt; Cuba	64.46 CR	Carmen Romero; Cuba	61.68	Laverne Eve; Bahamas	42.56
Javelin throw	María Beltrán; Cuba	59.06 CR	Mayra Vila; Cuba	56.80	Sonia Smith; Bermuda	46.84
Heptathlon	Elida Aveillé; Cuba	5312 CR	Marisela Peralta; Dominican Republic	5026	Victoria Despaigne; Cuba	4844

== Medal table ==
* Host nation (Dominican Republic)

Rank	Nation	Gold	Silver	Bronze	Total
1	Cuba (CUB)	22	18	10	50
2	Jamaica (JAM)	8	4	0	12
3	Mexico (MEX)	4	4	2	10
4	Bahamas (BAH)	2	2	6	10
5	Puerto Rico (PUR)	1	4	6	11
6	Colombia (COL)	1	1	6	8
7	Dominican Republic (DOM)*	1	1	5	7
8	Bermuda (BER)	0	2	1	3
9	Panama (PAN)	0	1	1	2
10	Barbados (BAR)	0	1	0	1
10	Trinidad and Tobago (TTO)	0	1	0	1
12	Antigua and Barbuda (ATG)	0	0	1	1
12	Guatemala (GUA)	0	0	1	1
Totals (13 entries)		39	39	39	117

== See also ==
- 1981 in athletics (track and field)
