= Divina Estrella =

Dominican Republic sprinter

Personal information
- Nationality: Dominican
- Born: 20 October 1956 (age 68)
- Height: 1.60 m (5 ft 3 in)
- Weight: 52 kg (115 lb)

Sport
- Sport: Sprinting
- Event: 100 metres

Divina Estrella (born 20 October 1956) is a Dominican Republic sprinter. She competed in the 100 metres at the 1976 Summer Olympics and the 1984 Summer Olympics. She was the first woman to represent the Dominican Republic at the Olympics.

== International competitions ==
| Year | Competition | Venue | Position | Event | Notes |
Representing the Dominican Republic
| 1974 | Central American and Caribbean Games | Santo Domingo, Dominican Republic | 6th | Long jump | 5.11 m |
| 1976 | Olympic Games | Montreal, Canada | 37th (h) | 100 m | 12.12 |
| 1976 | Olympic Games | Montreal, Canada | 34th (h) | 200 m | 24.95 |
| 1978 | Central American and Caribbean Games | Medellín, Colombia | 4th | 4 × 100 m relay | 46.30 |
| 1978 | Central American and Caribbean Games | Medellín, Colombia | 4th | 4 × 400 m relay | 3:53.37 |
| 1979 | Central American and Caribbean Championships | Guadalajara, Mexico | 3rd | 200 m | 24.41 |
| 1979 | Central American and Caribbean Championships | Guadalajara, Mexico | 3rd | 400 m hurdles | 62.43 |
| 1979 | Central American and Caribbean Championships | Guadalajara, Mexico | 2nd | 4 × 100 m relay | 46.79 |
| 1979 | Pan American Games | San Juan, Puerto Rico | 12th (sf) | 100 m | 12.03 |
| 1979 | Pan American Games | San Juan, Puerto Rico | 12th (sf) | 200 m | 24.39 |
| 1979 | Pan American Games | San Juan, Puerto Rico | 5th | 4 × 100 m relay | 47.25 |
| 1981 | Central American and Caribbean Championships | Santo Domingo, Dominican Republic | 3rd | 4 × 400 m relay | 3:49.62 |
| 1982 | Central American and Caribbean Games | Havana, Cuba | 5th | 400 m hurdles | 60.16 |
| 1982 | Central American and Caribbean Games | Havana, Cuba | 5th | 4 × 100 m relay | 46.99 |
| 1982 | Central American and Caribbean Games | Havana, Cuba | 5th | 4 × 400 m relay | 3:45.16 |
| 1984 | Olympic Games | Los Angeles, United States | 37th (h) | 100 m | 12.25 |
| 1984 | Olympic Games | Los Angeles, United States | 28th (qf) | 200 m | 24.98 |

== Personal bests ==
Outdoor

- 100 metres – 11.3 (1984)
- 200 metres – 23.6 (1984)
