= Leleith Hodges =

Jamaican sprinter (born 1953)

Medal record

Women's athletics

Representing Jamaica

Pan American Games
Silver medal – second place	1979 San Juan	4×100 m relay

Commonwealth Games
Bronze medal – third place	1982 Brisbane	4×100 m relay

World Championships
Bronze medal – third place	1983 Helsinki	4×100 m relay

Leleith Hodges (born 22 June 1953) is a Jamaican former track and field sprinter who competed mainly in the 100 metres. She was one of Jamaica's most prominent female runners of the 1970s.

She appeared three times at the Summer Olympics (1972, 1976, 1980) and three times at the Commonwealth Games (1974, 1978, 1982). Her highest honours came with the women's 4×100 m relay team, with which was a silver medallist at the 1979 Pan American Games and a bronze medallist at both the 1982 Commonwealth Games and 1983 World Championships in Athletics.

Hodges won numerous at regional level at the Central American and Caribbean Championships and Central American and Caribbean Games, including back-to-back victories in the individual 100 metres and relay at the championships in 1979 and 1981.

She was the 100 m champion at the USA Outdoor Track and Field Championships in 1978 – a feat for which she was chosen as the Jamaican Sportswoman of the Year. Her 100 m personal best of 11.14 seconds (a former Jamaican record) was set at that meet. She ran collegiately in the United States for Texas Woman's University and won the 100 m at the Association for Intercollegiate Athletics for Women championships.

== Career ==
=== Early life and career ===
Born in Islington in Jamaica's Saint Mary Parish, she attended nearby St Mary High School. While there she took up running and became the 100 m champion at the Jamaican Girls High School Championships in 1970.

In her first international championship, she won the 100 m junior title at the newly inaugurated 1972 CARIFTA Games. At the age of nineteen she was chosen to represent Jamaica in the 4×100 metres relay at the 1972 Munich Olympics. The team were disqualified in the first round, however.

=== Regional medals and Olympic debut ===
Hodges took to competing in sprinting full-time and was rewarded with her first senior international medal – a 100 m bronze – at the 1974 Central American and Caribbean Games, finishing behind Cuban duo Carmen Valdés and Silvia Chivás. Hodges also ran at the British Commonwealth Games that year, but failed to make it to the 100 m final. Another 100 m bronze followed at the Central American and Caribbean Championships in 1975 and she also won gold with the Jamaican relay team. After a run at the 1979 Pan American Games, where she was seventh in the 100 m, she returned to the Olympic stage at the 1976 Montreal Games. She was only a quarter-finalist individually, but managed sixth place in the relay on the lead off leg alongside Rose Allwood, Carol Cummings and Jacqueline Pusey.

Hodges had her best individual finish yet at the 1977 Central American and Caribbean Championships in Athletics, taking silver behind Cuba's Chivás. The pair repeated that finish at the Central American and Caribbean Games the following year, and Hodges also won a second silver leading off the Jamaican relay team of Dorothy Scott, Pusey, and Maureen Gottschalk. She was seventh in the 100 m final at the 1978 Commonwealth Games.

=== American titles and Jamaican record ===
Hodges became dissatisfied with the limited opportunities to compete and in January 1978, after a conversation with fellow Jamaican Olympian Audrey Reid, she decided to enrol in a physical education major at Texas Woman's University, where Reid had already attended. She was dominant that year, beating Evelyn Ashford at the Association for Intercollegiate Athletics for Women championships in a 100 m meet record of 11.18 seconds, then besting Brenda Morehead at the USA Outdoor Track and Field Championships. In the semi-finals of that competition she set a lifetime best and Jamaican record of 11.14 seconds for the 100 m. This placed her joint second on the global rankings for the event that year, only behind European champion Marlies Göhr. In recognition of her achievements that year she was honoured as the Jamaican Sportswoman of the Year.

Returning to international competition in 1979, she achieved a 100 m individual and relay double at the Central American and Caribbean Championships. A relay silver medal came at the Pan American Games, where she was again the starter for the Jamaican team, which included Allwood, Carmetta Drummond, and Merlene Ottey. Hodges ranked fifth individually, where American rivals Ashford and Morehead took the top two spots.

She had mixed fortunes in 1980 as she endured hamstring pain. She won the 60 metres at the AIAW indoor meet, but failed to defend her AIAW title, coming fifth, and dropped out of the relay due to her injury. Her third and final Olympic appearance came at the age of 27 at the 1980 Moscow Olympics, where she ran in the heats of the 100 m and came sixth in the relay with Pusey, Allwood, and Ottey (setting a Jamaican record of 43.19 seconds). While there Hodges commented on the lack of children in the city, and posited that the Soviet's did not want their children engaging with Westerners. Hodges was disappointed with the relay team's Olympic result, as a poor baton change between Allwood and Ottey led to a slower time. Hodges blamed Ottey, who had run off too early and performed poorly in practice, saying "She never focused on the relays. She was just so obsessed with her own race."

Hodges last season with coach Bert Lyle's Texas Woman's Pioneers team was in 1981. She attempted to recapture her AIAW title but was beaten to the 100 m championship by fellow Jamaica Merlene Ottey, 11.20 to 11.24 seconds. At the 1981 Texas Relays she defeated American Jeanette Bolden to take the 100 m title there, in spite of tumbling heavily at the start of the race. Her season's best time of 11.21 seconds that year marked her second highest career ranking at tenth place globally. She defended two gold medals at the 1981 Central American and Caribbean Championships in Athletics, beating two championship records in the process with 11.38 seconds in the 100 m and 44.62 seconds in the 4×100 m relay.

=== Late career and relay medals ===
By 1982, Hodges role as leading Jamaican women's sprinter had been overtaken by Merlene Ottey. At the 1982 Commonwealth Games and 1983 World Championships in Athletics Hodges failed to make the finals, while Ottey won sprint medals. The paired teamed up, however, to raise the Jamaican relay team to new heights.

Hodges handed off the relay baton to Ottey at the Commonwealth Games and the team (also featuring Cathy Rattray-Williams and Grace Jackson) were the bronze medallists behind England and Canada – Jamaica's first ever women's medal in that event at the games. In her last major international Hodges led off the Jamaican women's 4×100 m relay team at the World Championships. With Ottey on the anchor leg, and Pusey and Juliet Cuthbert on the middle legs, the team finished in a new time of 42.73 – just two hundredths behind the British women who were runners-up. This marked the first medal that began a long period of World Championships podium finishes for the Jamaican women's team. She had won the 100 m title at the Jamaican Athletics Championships that year.

Hodges aimed to make the team for Jamaica at the 1984 Summer Olympics, but after falling pregnant she missed the competition and did not compete internationally again. She had three children, Randy, Tanya and Natasha, with her husband Daniel. After her retirement from athletics, she was inducted into the Texas Woman's University Hall of Fame in 1999.

== National titles ==
- USA Outdoor Track and Field Championships
  - 100 metres: 1978
- Jamaican Athletics Championships
  - 100 metres: 1983

== International competitions ==
Representing Jamaica
Year	Competition	Venue	Position	Event	Notes
1972	CARIFTA Games	Bridgetown, Barbados	1st	100 m	11.7
1972	Olympic Games	Munich, Germany	— (heats)	4×100 m relay	DQ
1974	CAC Games	Santo Domingo, Dominican Republic	3rd	100 m	11.75
1974	British Commonwealth Games	Christchurch, New Zealand	8th (semis)	100 m	12.98
1975	CAC Championships	Ponce, Puerto Rico	3rd	100 m	12.1
1975	CAC Championships	Ponce, Puerto Rico	1st	4×100 m relay	45.7
1975	Pan American Games	Mexico City, Mexico	7th	100 m	11.74
1976	Olympic Games	Montreal, Canada	21st (q-finals)	100 m	11.58
1976	Olympic Games	Montreal, Canada	6th	4×100 m relay	43.24
1977	CAC Championships	Xalapa, Mexico	2nd	100 m	11.71
1978	CAC Games	Medellín, Colombia	2nd	100 m	11.63
1978	CAC Games	Medellín, Colombia	2nd	4×100 m relay	44.41
1978	Commonwealth Games	Edmonton, Canada	7th	100 m	11.47
1979	CAC Championships	Guadalajara, Mexico	1st	100 m	11.64A
1979	CAC Championships	Guadalajara, Mexico	1st	4×100 m relay	44.82A
1979	Pan American Games	San Juan, Puerto Rico	5th	100 m	11.49
1979	Pan American Games	San Juan, Puerto Rico	2nd	4×100 m relay	44.18
1980	Olympic Games	Moscow, Soviet Union	5th (heats)	100 m	11.79
1980	Olympic Games	Moscow, Soviet Union	6th	4×100 m relay	43.19 NR
1981	CAC Championships	Santo Domingo, Dominican Republic	1st	100 m	11.38 CR
1981	CAC Championships	Santo Domingo, Dominican Republic	1st	4×100 m relay	44.62 CR
1982	Commonwealth Games	Brisbane, Australia	6th (semis)	100 m	11.69
1982	Commonwealth Games	Brisbane, Australia	3rd	4×100 m relay	43.69
1983	World Championships	Helsinki, Finland	6th (q-finals)	100 m	11.63
1983	World Championships	Helsinki, Finland	3rd	4×100 m relay	42.73

== See also ==
- List of 100 metres national champions (women)
- Athletics in Jamaica
