= Alejandro Casañas =

Cuban hurdler

Personal information
- Born: 29 January 1954 (age 72) Havana, Cuba

Sport
- Sport: Track and field
Medal record
Representing Cuba
Olympic Games
Silver medal – second place	1976 Montreal	110 m hurdles
Silver medal – second place	1980 Moscow	110 m hurdles
Pan American Games
Gold medal – first place	1975 Mexico City	110 m hurdles
Silver medal – second place	1975 Mexico City	4 x 100 m relay
Silver medal – second place	1979 San Juan	110 m hurdles
Silver medal – second place	1983 Caracas	110 m hurdles
Central American and Caribbean Games
Gold medal – first place	1974 Santo Domingo	110 m hurdles
Gold medal – first place	1978 Medellín	110 m hurdles
Gold medal – first place	1982 Havana	110 m hurdles
Central American and Caribbean Championships
Gold medal – first place	1977 Ponce	110 m hurdles
Gold medal – first place	1981 Santo Domingo	110 m hurdles
Gold medal – first place	1983 Havana	110 m hurdles
Gold medal – first place	1985 Nassau	110 m hurdles
Summer Universiade
Gold medal – first place	1977 Sofia	110 m hurdles
Representing Americas
IAAF World Cup
Silver medal – second place	1977 Düsseldorf	110 m hurdles
Silver medal – second place	1981 Rome	110 m hurdles
Bronze medal – third place	1979 Montreal	110 m hurdles

Alejandro Francisco Casañas Ramírez (born January 29, 1954) is a former Cuban hurdler.

At the 1977 Summer Universiade in Sofia he set a new world record in the 110 m hurdles with a time 13.21 seconds. This record would, however, only stand for two years. He could never fully copy the world-leading performance at the Olympic Games, where he won silver medals in 1976 and 1980.

His Cuban record time has later been improved by Anier García, Dayron Robles and Emilio Valle.

== International competitions ==
Year	Competition	Venue	Position	Event	Notes
Representing Cuba
1971	Central American and Caribbean Championships	Kingston, Jamaica	4th	110 m hurdles	14.3
1971	Pan American Games	Cali, Colombia	5th	110 m hurdles	14.17
1972	Olympic Games	Munich, West Germany	–	110 m hurdles	DNF
1974	Central American and Caribbean Games	Santo Domingo, Dominican Republic	1st	110 m hurdles	13.80 (w)
1975	Pan American Games	Mexico City, Mexico	1st	110 m hurdles	13.44
1975	Pan American Games	Mexico City, Mexico	2nd	4 × 100 m relay	38.46
1976	Olympic Games	Montreal, Canada	2nd	110 m hurdles	13.33
1976	Olympic Games	Montreal, Canada	5th	4 × 100 m relay	39.01
1977	Central American and Caribbean Championships	Xalapa, Mexico	1st	110 m hurdles	13.55
1977	Central American and Caribbean Championships	Xalapa, Mexico	1st	4 × 100 m relay	39.86
1977	Universiade	Sofia, Bulgaria	1st	110 m hurdles	13.21 WR
1977	Universiade	Sofia, Bulgaria	4th	4 × 100 m relay	39.31
1977	World Cup	Düsseldorf, West Germany	2nd	110 m hurdles	13.50^{1}
1978	Central American and Caribbean Games	Medellín, Colombia	1st	110 m hurdles	13.67
1978	Central American and Caribbean Games	Medellín, Colombia	2nd	4 × 100 m relay	39.44
1979	Pan American Games	San Juan, Puerto Rico	2nd	110 m hurdles	13.46
1979	Pan American Games	San Juan, Puerto Rico	2nd	4 × 100 m relay	39.14
1979	World Cup	Montreal, Canada	3rd	110 m hurdles	13.44^{1}
1980	Olympic Games	Moscow, Soviet Union	2nd	110 m hurdles	13.40
1980	Olympic Games	Moscow, Soviet Union	–	4 × 100 m relay	DNF
1981	Central American and Caribbean Championships	Santo Domingo, Dominican Republic	1st	110 m hurdles	13.85
1981	Central American and Caribbean Championships	Santo Domingo, Dominican Republic	3rd	4 × 100 m relay	39.96
1981	World Cup	Rome, Italy	2nd	110 m hurdles	13.36^{1}
1982	Central American and Caribbean Games	Havana, Cuba	1st	110 m hurdles	13.38
1982	Central American and Caribbean Games	Havana, Cuba	1st	4 × 100 m relay	39.15
1983	Central American and Caribbean Championships	Havana, Cuba	1st	110 m hurdles	13.61 (w)
1983	World Championships	Helsinki, Finland	9th (h)	110 m hurdles	13.70^{2}
1983	Pan American Games	Caracas, Venezuela	2nd	110 m hurdles	13.51
1984	Friendship Games	Moscow, Soviet Union	7th	110 m hurdles	25.60
1985	Central American and Caribbean Championships	Nassau, Bahamas	1st	110 m hurdles	13.68

^{1}Representing the Americas
^{2}Did not start in the semifinals

Records
Preceded by (United States) Rodney Milburn	Men's 110m Hurdles World Record Holder; August 21, 1977 — April 14, 1979	Succeeded by (United States) Renaldo Nehemiah
Sporting positions
Preceded by (France) Guy Drut	Men's 110m Hurdles Best Year Performance; 1977	Succeeded by (United States) Greg Foster
