= Felicia Candelario =

Dominican Republic sprinter

Personal information
- Full name: Felicia Candelario Ortiz
- Nationality: Dominican
- Born: 7 January 1961 (age 64) Santo Domingo
- Height: 1.62 m (5 ft 4 in)
- Weight: 55 kg (121 lb)

Sport
- Sport: Sprinting
- Event: 400 metres hurdles

Felicia Candelario Ortiz (born 7 January 1961) is a Dominican Republic sprinter. She competed in the women's 100 metres at the 1984 Summer Olympics.

Her personal best in the 100 metres is 11.2 set in 1984.

== International competitions ==
Year	Competition	Venue	Position	Event	Notes
Representing the Dominican Republic
1978	Central American and Caribbean Games	Medellín, Colombia	4th	4 × 100 m relay	46.30
1978	Central American and Caribbean Games	Medellín, Colombia	4th	4 × 400 m relay	3:53.37
1979	Central American and Caribbean Championships	Guadalajara, Mexico	2nd	4 × 100 m relay	46.79
1979	Pan American Games	San Juan, Puerto Rico	5th	4 × 100 m relay	47.25
1980	Pan American Junior Championships	Sudbury, Canada	1st	400 m hurdles	60.13
1980	Pan American Junior Championships	Sudbury, Canada	2nd	4 × 100 m relay	48.63
1980	Pan American Junior Championships	Sudbury, Canada	3rd	4 × 400 m relay	4:12.95
1981	Central American and Caribbean Championships	Santo Domingo, Dominican Republic	3rd	400 m hurdles	59.66
1981	Central American and Caribbean Championships	Santo Domingo, Dominican Republic	3rd	4 × 400 m relay	3:49.62
1982	Central American and Caribbean Games	Havana, Cuba	4th	400 m hurdles	59.14
1982	Central American and Caribbean Games	Havana, Cuba	5th	4 × 100 m relay	46.99
1982	Central American and Caribbean Games	Havana, Cuba	5th	4 × 400 m relay	3:45.16
1983	Central American and Caribbean Championships	Havana, Cuba	2nd	400 m hurdles	60.06
1983	World Championships	Helsinki, Finland	30th (h)	400 m hurdles	60.72
1983	Pan American Games	Caracas, Venezuela	9th (h)	400 m hurdles	60.46
1984	Olympic Games	Los Angeles, United States	34th (h)	100 m	12.12^{1}
1986	Central American and Caribbean Games	Santiago, Dominican Republic	4th	4 × 100 m relay	45.81

^{1}Did not start in the quarterfinals
