= Nilsa Paris =

Puerto Rican sprinter

Personal information
- Full name: Nilsa M. Paris Millán
- Born: 11 April 1958 (age 68) Carolina, Puerto Rico

Sport
- Sport: Athletics
- Events: 100 m, 200 m
Medal record
Representing Puerto Rico
Central American and Caribbean Games
Silver medal – second place	1982 Havana	4x400m relay

Nilsa M. Paris Millán (born 11 April 1958) is a retired Puerto Rican sprinter. She represented her country at the 1983 World Championships and editions of two Pan American Games.

Her older sister Vilma Paris was also a sprinter.

== International competitions ==
Year	Competition	Venue	Position	Event	Notes
Representing Puerto Rico
1977	Central American and Caribbean Championships	Xalapa, Mexico	2nd	4 × 100 m relay	46.93
1977	Universiade	Sofia, Bulgaria	6th	4 × 100 m relay	45.78
1979	Central American and Caribbean Championships	Guadalajara, Mexico	3rd	4 × 100 m relay	47.16
1979	Pan American Games	San Juan, Puerto Rico	14th (sf)	100 m	12.10
1979	Pan American Games	San Juan, Puerto Rico	14th (sf)	200 m	24.58 (w)
1979	Pan American Games	San Juan, Puerto Rico	–	4 × 100 m relay	DQ
1979	Pan American Games	San Juan, Puerto Rico	5th	4 × 400 m relay	3:49.4
1982	Central American and Caribbean Games	Havana, Cuba	5th (sf)	100 m	12.07
1982	Central American and Caribbean Games	Havana, Cuba	6th	200 m	24.64
1982	Central American and Caribbean Games	Havana, Cuba	4th	4 × 100 m relay	46.71
1982	Central American and Caribbean Games	Havana, Cuba	2nd	4 × 400 m relay	3:36.52
1983	Central American and Caribbean Championships	Havana, Cuba	3rd	200 m	23.70
1983	Central American and Caribbean Championships	Havana, Cuba	2nd	4 × 100 m relay	46.69
1983	Central American and Caribbean Championships	Havana, Cuba	2nd	4 × 400 m relay	3:39.36
1983	World Championships	Helsinki, Finland	10th (h)	4 × 400 m relay	3:42.79
1983	Pan American Games	Caracas, Venezuela	9th (h)	100 m	12.15
1983	Pan American Games	Caracas, Venezuela	5th	200 m	23.99
1983	Pan American Games	Caracas, Venezuela	5th	4 × 400 m relay	3:42.90
