= Melquises Fonseca =

Cuban runner (born 1949)

Personal information
- Born: 1 June 1949

Sport
- Sport: Athletics
- Event: 1500 metres

Melquises Fonseca (born 1 June 1949) is a retired Cuban middle-distance runner who specialised in the 1500 metres. She won several medals at regional level.

== International competitions ==
Year	Competition	Venue	Position	Event	Notes
Representing Cuba
1970	Central American and Caribbean Games	Panama City, Panama	5th	800 m	2:19.8
1971	Central American and Caribbean Championships	Kingston, Jamaica	3rd	1500 m	4:38.5
1973	Central American and Caribbean Championships	Maracaibo, Venezuela	3rd	1500 m	4:37.3
1977	Central American and Caribbean Championships	Xalapa, Mexico	2nd	1500 m	4:42.06
1977	Central American and Caribbean Championships	Xalapa, Mexico	2nd	3000 m	10:13.73
1978	Central American and Caribbean Games	Medellín, Colombia	4th	1500 m	4:43.75
1979	Central American and Caribbean Championships	Guadalajara, Mexico	1st	1500 m	4:40.0
1979	Central American and Caribbean Championships	Guadalajara, Mexico	1st	3000 m	10:06.6
