= Athletics at the 1979 Pan American Games – Women's 100 metres =

Women's 100 metres at the 1979 Pan American Games
- Venue: Estadio Sixto Escobar
- Dates: 7–8 July
- Winning time: 11.07

Medalists
Gold medal	Evelyn Ashford	United States
Silver medal	Brenda Morehead	United States
Bronze medal	Angella Taylor	Canada

The women's 100 metres sprint competition of the athletics events at the 1979 Pan American Games took place on 7 and 8 July at the Estadio Sixto Escobar. The defending Pan American Games champion was Pamela Jiles of the United States.

== Records ==
Prior to this competition, the existing world and Pan American Games records were as follows:

World record	Marlies Göhr (GDR)	10.88	Dresden, East Germany	July 1, 1977
Pan American Games record	Iris Davis (USA)	11.20	Cali, Colombia	1971

== Results ==
All times shown are in seconds.

KEY:	WR	World Record	GR	Pan American Record

=== Heats ===
Held on 7 July

Wind:
Heat 1: +1.4 m/s, Heat 2: +1.6 m/s, Heat 3: +1.4 m/s

Rank	Heat	Name	Nationality	Time	Notes
1	1	Evelyn Ashford	United States	11.09	Q, GR
2	3	Brenda Morehead	United States	11.38	Q
3	2	Angella Taylor	Canada	11.42	Q
4	2	Silvia Chivás	Cuba	11.43	Q
5	3	Leleith Hodges	Jamaica	11.49	Q
6	2	Rosie Allwood	Jamaica	11.63	Q
7	1	Beatriz Allocco	Argentina	11.79	Q
8	1	Isabel Taylor	Cuba	11.85	Q
9	3	Sheila de Oliveira	Brazil	11.89	Q
10	2	Jennifer Innis	Guyana	11.91	Q
11	1	Carmela Bolívar	Peru	11.94	Q
12	3	Divina Estrella	Dominican Republic	12.07	Q
13	2	Sueli Machado	Brazil	12.11	Q
14	3	Nilsa Paris	Puerto Rico	12.14	Q
15	3	June Caddle	Barbados	12.17	q
16	1	Teresa Almánzar	Dominican Republic	12.36	Q
17	2	Beatriz Capotosto	Argentina	12.42	

=== Semifinals ===
Held on 7 July

Wind:
Heat 1: +0.9 m/s, Heat 2: +2.7 m/s

Rank	Heat	Name	Nationality	Time	Notes
1	1	Evelyn Ashford	United States	11.05	Q, GR
2	2	Brenda Morehead	United States	11.15	Q
3	2	Angella Taylor	Canada	11.26	Q
4	1	Silvia Chivás	Cuba	11.35	Q
5	2	Rosie Allwood	Jamaica	11.48	Q
6	1	Leleith Hodges	Jamaica	11.50	Q
7	2	Sheila de Oliveira	Brazil	11.74	q
8	2	Isabel Taylor	Cuba	11.81	q
9	1	Jennifer Innis	Guyana	11.88	
10	1	Carmela Bolívar	Peru	11.89	
11	1	Beatriz Allocco	Argentina	11.96	
12	2	Divina Estrella	Dominican Republic	12.03	
13	2	June Caddle	Barbados	12.09	
14	2	Nilsa Paris	Puerto Rico	12.10	
15	1	Teresa Almánzar	Dominican Republic	12.33	
	1	Sueli Machado	Brazil	DNS	

=== Final ===
Held on 8 July

Wind: +0.9 m/s

Rank	Name	Nationality	Time	Notes
1st place, gold medalist(s)	Evelyn Ashford	United States	11.07	
2nd place, silver medalist(s)	Brenda Morehead	United States	11.11	
3rd place, bronze medalist(s)	Angella Taylor	Canada	11.36	
4	Silvia Chivás	Cuba	11.48	
5	Leleith Hodges	Jamaica	11.49	
6	Rosie Allwood	Jamaica	11.69	
7	Sheila de Oliveira	Brazil	11.80	
8	Isabel Taylor	Cuba	11.94	
