= Eloína Kerr =

Personal information
- Born: 24 July 1959 (age 66)

Sport
- Sport: Athletics
- Event: 1500 metres

Eloína Kerr Castellanos (born 24 July 1959) is a retired Cuban middle-distance runner who specialised in the 1500 metres. She won several medals at regional level.

== International competitions ==
Year	Competition	Venue	Position	Event	Notes
Representing Cuba
1979	Central American and Caribbean Championships	Guadalajara, Mexico	2nd	800 m	2:09.3
1979	Central American and Caribbean Championships	Guadalajara, Mexico	1st	4 × 400 metres relay	3:41.8
1981	Central American and Caribbean Championships	Santo Domingo, Dominican Republic	3rd	1500 m	4:33.23
1981	Universiade	Bucharest, Romania	16th (h)	1500 m	4:33.01
1983	Central American and Caribbean Championships	Havana, Cuba	1st	1500 m	4:21.06
1983	Pan American Games	Caracas, Venezuela	5th	800 m	2:04.96
1983	Pan American Games	Caracas, Venezuela	–	1500 m	DNF
1983	Ibero-American Championships	Barcelona, Spain	4th	1500 m	4:20.20
