= Athletics at the 1983 Pan American Games – Women's 1500 metres =

Women's 1500 metres at the Pan American Games

The women's 1500 metres event at the 1983 Pan American Games was held in Caracas, Venezuela on 28 August.

== Results ==
Rank	Name	Nationality	Time	Notes
1st place, gold medalist(s)	Ranza Clark	Canada	4:16.18	
2nd place, silver medalist(s)	Cindy Bremser	United States	4:17.67	
3rd place, bronze medalist(s)	Missy Kane	United States	4:21.39	
4	Alejandra Ramos	Chile	4:25.59	
5	Fabiola Rueda	Colombia	4:26.05	
6	Mónica Regonessi	Chile	4:26.48	
7	Adriana Marchena	Venezuela	4:27.50	
8	Norma Franco	El Salvador	4:35.10	
9	Laverne Bryan	Antigua and Barbuda	4:36.45	
10	Liliana Góngora	Argentina	4:38.64	
11	Ruth Jaime	Peru	4:39.54	
12	Janice Carlo	Puerto Rico	4:40.17	
	Eloína Kerr	Cuba	DNF	
