= Alberto Juantorena =

Cuban runner (born 1950)

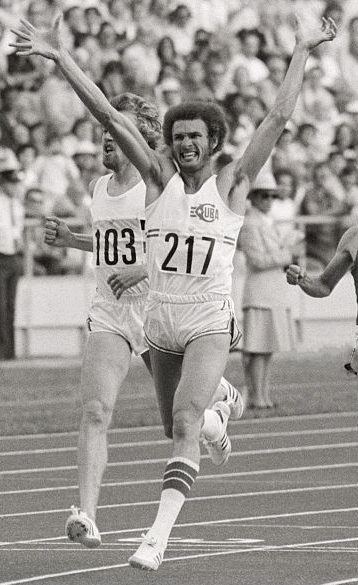
- Juantorena winning the 800 m final at the 1976 Olympics

Personal information
- Full name: Alberto Juantorena Danger
- Nicknames: El Caballo; El elegante de las pistas
- Born: 3 December 1950 (age 75) Santiago de Cuba
- Height: 190 cm (6 ft 3 in)
- Weight: 84 kg (185 lb)

Sport
- Sport: Athletics
- Events: 400 m, 800 m
- Coached by: Zygmunt Zabierzowski
- Retired: 1984

Achievements and titles
- Personal bests: 400 m – 44.26 (1976); 800 m – 1:43.44 (1977)
Medal record
Representing Cuba
Olympic Games
Gold medal – first place	1976 Montreal	400 m
Gold medal – first place	1976 Montreal	800 m
Pan American Games
Silver medal – second place	1975 Mexico City	400 m
Silver medal – second place	1975 Mexico City	4 × 400 m
Silver medal – second place	1979 San Juan	400 m
Silver medal – second place	1979 San Juan	800 m
Bronze medal – third place	1979 San Juan	4 × 400 m
Central American and Caribbean Games
Gold medal – first place	1974 Santo Domingo	400 m
Gold medal – first place	1978 Medellín	400 m
Gold medal – first place	1978 Medellín	800 m
Gold medal – first place	1982 Havana	800 m
Central American and Caribbean Championships
Gold medal – first place	1973 Maracaibo	400 m
Gold medal – first place	1981 Santo Domingo	800 m
Silver medal – second place	1977 Ponce	400 m
Summer Universiade
Gold medal – first place	1973 Moscow	400 m
Gold medal – first place	1977 Sofia	800 m
Friendship Games
Gold medal – first place	1984 Moscow	800 m
Representing Americas
IAAF World Cup
Gold medal – first place	1977 Düsseldorf	400 m
Gold medal – first place	1977 Düsseldorf	800 m
Bronze medal – third place	1977 Düsseldorf	4 × 400 m
- Updated on 6 June 2015

Alberto Juantorena (born 3 December 1950) is a Cuban former runner. He is the only athlete to win both the 400 and 800 m Olympic titles, which he achieved in 1976. He was ranked as the world's best runner in the 400 m in 1974 and 1976–1978, and in the 800 m in 1976–77, and was chosen as the Track & Field News Athlete of the Year in 1976 and 1977.

== Biography ==
=== Early sports activities ===
As a 188 cm (6 ft 2 in) 14-year-old, Juantorena was first considered a potential star at basketball; he was sent to a state basketball school, and was a member of the national team. Meanwhile, he had been a regional high-school champion at 800 and 1500 meters. His running talent was discovered by a Polish track coach, Zygmunt Zabierzowski, who convinced him to start running seriously. Juantorena was ready for the change because as he states himself he was a 'bad' basketball player and his idol was the Cuban sprinter Enrique Figuerola. Only a year later, Juantorena reached the semifinals of the 400 m event at the 1972 Summer Olympics, missing a place in the final by 0.05 seconds.

Juantorena proceeded to win a gold medal at the 1973 World University Games and a silver at the 1975 Pan American Games, both in the 400 meters. He was unbeaten in 1973 and 1974, but underwent two operations on his foot in 1975. He only seriously took up running the 800 meters in 1976, so few thought he was a candidate for the Olympic gold that year. His coach, Zabierzowski, had initially tricked him into trying an 800 m race by convincing him the other runners needed a pacemaker.

=== Olympics 1976 ===
Juantorena made it to the 800 m Olympic final, and led the field for most of the race, eventually winning in a world record time of 1:43.50. He was the first non-English speaking athlete to win Olympic gold in this event. Three days later, he also won the 400 meter final, setting a low-altitude world record at 44.26. By winning the 400 meters, he became the first athlete since Paul Pilgrim at the 1906 Intercalated Games to do such a double at an Olympic sports event, and was the only man to do so at an officially recognized Olympics.

=== Subsequent athletics career ===
In 1977, he set another world record in the 800, running 1:43.44 in Sofia at the World University Games. He also won both the 400 m and 800 m at the 1977 IAAF World Cup. The 400 m race was mired in controversy when the race was re-run a day after the initial race, in which Juantorena finished third, because Juantorena lodged a successful protest that his slow start had been due to not being able to hear the starter's gun. The latter race featured an epic duel with his great rival Kenya's Mike Boit, a duel that did not happen at the previous year's Olympics because of the African countries boycott.

Juantorena, now known at home as El Caballo (the horse), continued his career, although injuries meant he would never reach the same level as in Montreal. Juantorena had been born with flat feet that caused feet and back problems, and he had to have corrective surgery in 1977. In 1978 he was unbeaten at the 400 m, but suffered his first ever defeat at 800 meters. Injuries, particularly hamstring injuries, hampered his training and racing leading up to the 1980 Moscow Olympics, where he just missed out on a medal in the 400 meters, placing fourth.

At the 1983 World Championships, his last international appearance in a major event, he broke his foot and tore ligaments when he stepped on the inside of the track after qualifying in the first round of the 800 m. He returned to training with a view to competing in the 1984 Summer Olympics. However the 1984 Summer Olympics boycott ended his last chance for competing at Olympics. Instead, he took part in the Friendship Games, the alternative to the official Olympics for the Eastern bloc countries, where he shared the gold medal in the 800 m with Ryszard Ostrowski.

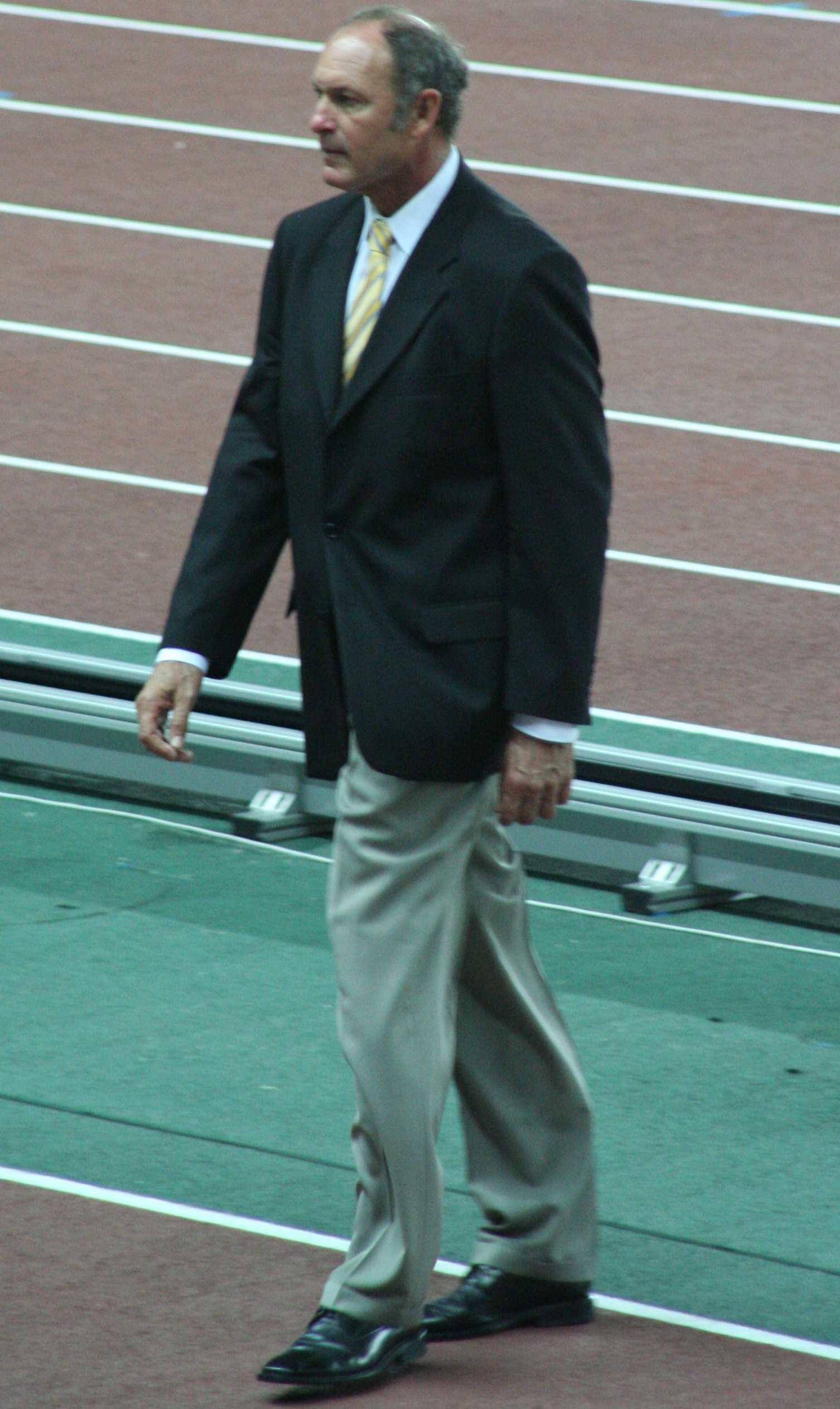
Juantorena at the 2007 World Championships in Athletics

=== After retirement ===
After retirement from athletics in 1984, Juantorena has served in many official capacities, including as the Vice President of the National Institute for Sports, Physical Education and Recreation for Cuba, Vice Minister for Sport of Cuba, and vice-president, later Senior Vice-president of the Cuban Olympic Committee. He is a member of the World Athletics Council, and has also served as an Athletes' Commission Chairman and Grand Prix Commission Member.

== Personal life ==
Juantorena was first married in 1972 to Yria, a former gymnast, with whom he had two children; He married twice more before meeting his current wife Yolanda, an employee of Cubana de Aviación. He has seven children in total. His nephew Osmany Juantorena is a professional volleyball player. In 2021 Juantorena was the subject of a feature documentary Running for the Revolution produced by British filmmaker Mark Craig. https://worldathletics.org/news/news/alberto-juantorena-running-for-the-revolution-film-release

== International competitions ==
Year	Competition	Venue	Position	Event	Notes
Representing Cuba
1972	Olympic Games	Munich, West Germany	11th (sf)	400 m	46.07
1973	Central American and Caribbean Championships	Maracaibo, Venezuela	1st	400 m	46.4
1973	Central American and Caribbean Championships	Maracaibo, Venezuela	2nd	4 × 400 m relay	3:10.1
1973	Universiade	Moscow, Soviet Union	1st	400 m	45.36
1974	Central American and Caribbean Games	Santo Domingo, Dominican Republic	1st	400 m	45.52
1974	Central American and Caribbean Games	Santo Domingo, Dominican Republic	1st	4 × 400 m relay	3:06.36
1975	Pan American Games	Mexico City, Mexico	2nd	400 m	44.80
1975	Pan American Games	Mexico City, Mexico	2nd	4 × 400 m relay	3:02.82
1976	Olympic Games	Montreal, Canada	1st	400 m	44.26
1976	Olympic Games	Montreal, Canada	1st	800 m	1:43.50 (WR)
1976	Olympic Games	Montreal, Canada	7th	4 × 400 m relay	3:03.81
1977	Central American and Caribbean Championships	Xalapa, Mexico	2nd	400 m	45.67
1977	Central American and Caribbean Championships	Xalapa, Mexico	1st	4 × 400 m relay	3:09.24
1977	Universiade	Sofia, Bulgaria	1st	800 m	1:43.44 (WR)
1977	World Cup	Düsseldorf, West Germany	1st	400 m	45.36^{1}
1977	World Cup	Düsseldorf, West Germany	1st	800 m	1:44.04^{1}
1977	World Cup	Düsseldorf, West Germany	3rd	4 × 400 m relay	3:02.77^{1}
1978	Central American and Caribbean Games	Medellín, Colombia	1st	400 m	44.27
1978	Central American and Caribbean Games	Medellín, Colombia	1st	800 m	1:47.23
1978	Central American and Caribbean Games	Medellín, Colombia	3rd	4 × 400 m relay	3:05.57
1979	Pan American Games	San Juan, Puerto Rico	2nd	400 m	45.24
1979	Pan American Games	San Juan, Puerto Rico	2nd	800 m	1:46.4
1979	Pan American Games	San Juan, Puerto Rico	3rd	4 × 400 m relay	3:06.3
1980	Olympic Games	Moscow, Soviet Union	4th	400 m	45.09
1981	Central American and Caribbean Championships	Santo Domingo, Dominican Republic	1st	800 m	1:47.59
1982	Central American and Caribbean Games	Havana, Cuba	1st	800 m	1:45.15
1982	Central American and Caribbean Games	Havana, Cuba	1st	4 × 400 m relay	3:03.59
1983	World Championships	Helsinki, Finland	28th (h)	800 m	1:48.40^{2}
1984	Friendship Games	Moscow, Soviet Union	1st	800 m	1:45.68
1984	Friendship Games	Moscow, Soviet Union	3rd	4 × 400 m relay	3:04.76

^{1}Representing the Americas
^{2}Did not start in the semifinals

== Rankings ==
Juantorena was ranked among the best in the world in both the 400 and 800 m sprint events over the spread of 10 seasons from 1973 to 1982, according to the experts of Track & Field News.

World Rankings
Year	400 m	800 m
1973	3rd	–
1974	1st	–
1975	4th	–
1976	1st	1st
1977	1st	1st
1978	1st	6th
1979	5th	–
1980	10th	–
1981	–	–
1982	–	2nd

== Best performances ==
400 meters
Year	Result	World rank	Location	Date
1973	45.36	6th	Moscow	18 Aug
1974	44.7	1st	Turin	24 Jul
1975	44.80	2nd	Mexico City	18 Oct
1976	44.26; PB	1st	Montreal	29 Jul
1977	44.65	1st	Havana	13 Sep
1978	44.27	1st	Medellin	16 Jul
1979	45.24	10th	San Juan	12 Jul
1980	45.09	6th	Moscow	30 Jul
1982	45.51	25th	Koblenz	25 Aug

800 meters
Year	Result	World rank	Location	Date
1976	1.43.50	1st	Montreal	25 Jul
1977	1.43.44; PB	1st	Sofia	21 Aug
1978	1.44.38	4th	Cologne	22 Jun
1979	1.46.4	24th	San Juan	9 Jul
1981	1.46.0	20th	Havana	4 Jul
1982	1.45.15	14th	Havana	11 Aug
1983	1.45.04	18th	Havana	17 Jun
1984	1.44.88	22nd	Florence	13 Jun

== See also ==
- A Step Away – Official Documentary of the 1979 Pan American Games.

== Cited sources ==
- Sandrock, Michael (1996) Running with the Legends. Human Kinetics. ISBN 0873224930.

Records
Preceded by (Italy) Marcello Fiasconaro	Men's 800 m World Record Holder; 1976-07-16 – 1979-07-05	Succeeded by (United Kingdom) Sebastian Coe
Awards and achievements
Preceded by (Brazil) João Carlos de Oliveira	United Press International; Athlete of the Year; 1976–1977	Succeeded by (Kenya) Henry Rono
Preceded by (New Zealand) John Walker	Men's Track & Field Athlete of the Year; 1976–1977	Succeeded by (Kenya) Henry Rono
