= Marisela Peralta =

Dominican Republic hurdler

Personal information
- Full name: Marisela Peralta Febrillet
- Nationality: Dominican
- Born: 21 December 1955 (age 70)
- Height: 1.72 m (5 ft 8 in)
- Weight: 64 kg (141 lb)

Sport
- Sport: Track and field
- Event: 100 metres hurdles

Marisela Peralta Febrillet (born 21 December 1955) is a Dominican Republic hurdler. She competed in the women's 100 metres hurdles at the 1980 Summer Olympics. Peralta was the flag bearer for the Dominican Republic in the 1980 opening ceremony.

Her personal best in the event is 14.02 seconds set in 1982.

== International competitions ==
Year	Competition	Venue	Position	Event	Notes
Representing the Dominican Republic
1974	Central American and Caribbean Games	Santo Domingo, Dominican Republic	7th	High jump	1.50 m
1975	Pan American Games	Mexico City, Mexico	12th	Pentathlon	3430 pts
1977	Central American and Caribbean Championships	Xalapa, Mexico	2nd	Pentathlon	3303 pts
1978	Central American and Caribbean Games	Medellín, Colombia	2nd	100 m hurdles	14.23
1978	Central American and Caribbean Games	Medellín, Colombia	5th	Pentathlon	3419 pts
1979	Central American and Caribbean Championships	Guadalajara, Mexico	2nd	100 m hurdles	14.44
1979	Pan American Games	San Juan, Puerto Rico	13th (h)	100 m hurdles	14.72 (w)
1979	Pan American Games	San Juan, Puerto Rico	5th	4 × 100 m relay	47.25
1980	Olympic Games	Moscow, Soviet Union	19th (h)	100 m hurdles	14.18
1981	Central American and Caribbean Championships	Santo Domingo, Dominican Republic	3rd	100 m hurdles	14.09
1981	Central American and Caribbean Championships	Santo Domingo, Dominican Republic	2nd	Heptathlon	5026 pts
1982	Central American and Caribbean Games	Havana, Cuba	2nd	100 m hurdles	14.07
1982	Central American and Caribbean Games	Havana, Cuba	5th	4 × 100 m relay	46.99
1982	Central American and Caribbean Games	Havana, Cuba	4th	Heptathlon	5070 pts
1986	Central American and Caribbean Games	Santiago, Dominican Republic	6th	100 m hurdles	14.49

^{1}Representing the Americas

Olympic Games
Preceded by Eleoncio Mercedes	Flagbearer for Dominican Republic; Moscow 1980	Succeeded by Pedro Nolasco
