= Madeline de Jesús =

Puerto Rican long-jump competitor

Personal information
- Full name: Madeline de Jesús Candelaria
- Born: November 4, 1957 (age 69) Brooklyn, New York, U.S.
- Height: 167 cm (5 ft 6 in)
- Weight: 57 kg (126 lb)

Sport
- Country: Puerto Rico
- Events: long jump and triple jump
Medal record
Women's athletics
Representing Puerto Rico
Central American and Caribbean Games
Bronze medal – third place	1982 Havana	Long jump
Central American & Caribbean Championships
Bronze medal – third place	1977 Jalapa	4×400 m relay
Bronze medal – third place	1979 Guadalajara	4×100 m relay
Silver medal – second place	1979 Guadalajara	Long jump
Bronze medal – third place	1981 Santo Domingo	Long jump
Silver medal – second place	1983 Havana	4×100 m relay
Silver medal – second place	1983 Havana	4×400 m relay
Silver medal – second place	1983 Havana	Long jump
Silver medal – second place	1987 Caracas	Long jump
Ibero-American Championships
Gold medal – first place	1988 Mexico City	Long jump

Madeline de Jesús (born November 4, 1957) is a Puerto Rican former track and field athlete who specialized in the long jump. She won a bronze medal at the 1982 Central American and Caribbean Games and went on to represent Puerto Rico globally, competing in the long jump at both the 1984 Los Angeles and 1988 Seoul Summer Olympics.

De Jesús is most famously remembered for orchestrating a notorious twin-switching scandal at the 1984 Olympic Games. After suffering an injury during her individual long jump event, she realized she could not compete in the 4 × 400-meter relay and secretly enlisted her identical twin sister, Margaret, to run the qualifying heat as an imposter. Although the team successfully advanced, the Puerto Rican head coach discovered the deception and withdrew the squad from the final.

== Career ==
She was born on 4 November 1957.

She competed in the long jump at the 1982 Central American and Caribbean Games, winning the bronze medal with a jump of 6.47 m, losing to Eloína Echevarría, who reached 6.53 m, and Shonel Ferguson, who reached 6.47 m.

She competed in two Olympics, finishing 21st in round one of two rounds at the 1984 Summer Olympics and 23rd in round 1 of two rounds in the 1988 Summer Olympics.

== Olympic cheating ==
After Puerto Rico's Madeline de Jesus got injured while competing in the long jump, she was unable to run in the 4×400-meter relay at the 1984 Los Angeles Games. She came up with a plan and enlisted her identical twin sister, Margaret, as an imposter for a qualifying heat. Margaret ran the second leg of the qualifier, and the team advanced but when the chief coach of the Puerto Rican team learned of the ruse, he pulled his team out of the final.

== Achievements ==
Year	Competition	Venue	Position	Event	Notes
Representing Puerto Rico
1977	Central American and Caribbean Championships	Xalapa, Mexico	3rd	4 × 400 m relay	3:48.57
1978	Central American and Caribbean Games	Medellín, Colombia	6th	Long jump	5.74 m
1979	Central American and Caribbean Championships	Guadalajara, Mexico	3rd	4 × 100 m relay	47.16
1979	Central American and Caribbean Championships	Guadalajara, Mexico	2nd	Long jump	5.87 m
1979	Pan American Games	San Juan, Puerto Rico	–	4 × 100 m relay	DQ
1979	Pan American Games	San Juan, Puerto Rico	7th	Long jump	5.88 m
1981	Central American and Caribbean Championships	Santo Domingo, DR	3rd	Long jump	6.20 m
1981	Universiade	Bucharest, Romania	13th	Long jump	6.17 m
1982	Central American and Caribbean Games	Havana, Cuba	3rd	Long jump	6.47 m
1983	Central American and Caribbean Championships	Havana, Cuba	2nd	4 × 100 m relay	46.69
1983	Central American and Caribbean Championships	Havana, Cuba	2nd	4 × 400 m relay	3:39.36
1983	Central American and Caribbean Championships	Havana, Cuba	2nd	Long jump	6.49 m
1984	Olympic Games	Los Angeles, United States	21st (q)	Long jump	5.63 m
1987	Central American and Caribbean Championships	Caracas, Venezuela	2nd	Long jump	6.11 m
1987	Pan American Games	Indianapolis, United States	5th	Long jump	6.28 m
1988	Ibero-American Championships	Mexico City, Mexico	1st	Long jump	6.96 m A
1988	Olympic Games	Seoul, South Korea	23rd (q)	Long jump	6.08 m

== See also ==
- List of Puerto Ricans
