= Humberto Galea =

Venezuelan sprinter

Personal information
- Nationality: Venezuelan
- Born: 23 July 1950 (age 75)
- Height: 1.73 m (5 ft 8 in)
- Weight: 63 kg (139 lb)

Sport
- Sport: Sprinting
- Event: 100 metres

Humberto Galea (born 23 July 1950) is a retired Venezuelan sprinter. He competed in the men's 4 × 100 metres relay at the 1972 Summer Olympics.

== International competitions ==
Year	Competition	Venue	Position	Event	Notes
Representing Venezuela
1971	South American Championships	Lima, Peru	8th (h)	100 m	10.9
1972	Olympic Games	Munich, West Germany	13th (sf)	4 × 100 m relay	39.74
1973	Bolivarian Games	Panama City, Panama	4th	100 m	10.53
1973	Bolivarian Games	Panama City, Panama	1st	4 × 100 m relay	40.8
1977	Central American and Caribbean Championships	Xalapa, Mexico	3rd	4 × 100 m relay	40.71
1979	Central American and Caribbean Championships	Guadalajara, Mexico	2nd	4 × 400 m relay	3:08.9

== Personal bests ==
- 100 metres – 10.3 (Barcelona, VEN 1974)
