= 1979 Central American and Caribbean Championships in Athletics =

- Dates: 15–17 June
- Host city: Guadalajara, Mexico
- Venue: Estadio Revolución

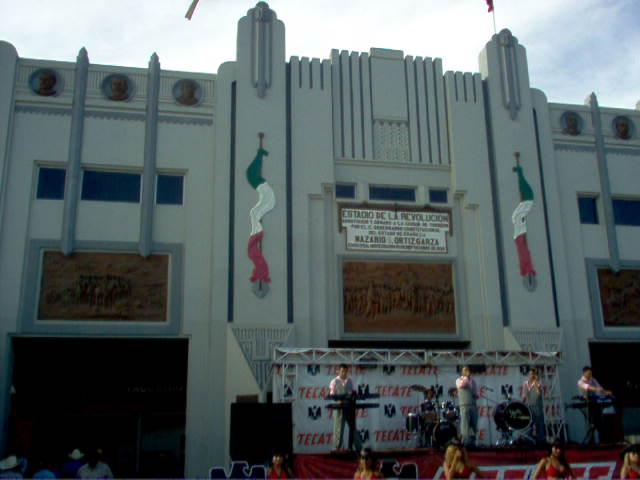
Host venue in Guadalajara.

The 1979 Central American and Caribbean Championships in Athletics were held at the Estadio Revolución in Guadalajara, Jalisco, Mexico 15–17 June 1979.

== Medal summary ==
=== Men's events ===
Event	Gold		Silver		Bronze	
100 metres	Guy Abrahams; Panama	10.37A	Gerardo Suero; Dominican Republic	10.53A	Esteban Briceño; Venezuela	10.54A
200 metres	Floyd Brown; Jamaica	21.30A	Rafael López; Dominican Republic	21.33A	Jesús Cabrera; Puerto Rico; Tomás González; Cuba	21.45A
400 metres	Colin Bradford; Jamaica	46.41A	Michael Barnes; Jamaica	46.84A	Dean Greenaway; British Virgin Islands	47.12A
800 metres	Owen Hamilton; Jamaica	1:48.2A	Eduardo Castro; Mexico	1:48.3A	Víctor Ramos; Puerto Rico	1:49.7A
1500 metres	Ignacio Melecio; Mexico	3:48.1A	Osmán Escobar; Venezuela	3:50.5A	Modesto Comprés; Dominican Republic	3:54.7A
5000 metres	José Gómez; Mexico	14:27.4A	Jaime Vélez; Puerto Rico	14:43.0A	Lucirio Garrido; Venezuela	14:50.4A
10,000 metres	Virgilio Herrera; Guatemala	31:42.8A	Luis Haro; Mexico	32:04.6A	Celso Garro; Costa Rica	32:48.8A
30 km road race	Mario Cuevas; Mexico	1:26:24A CR	Radamés González; Cuba	1:27:35A	Andrés Romero; Mexico	1:27:38A
110 metres hurdles	Rafael Echavarría; Mexico	13.93A	Jorge Palacios; Cuba	13.94A	Mariano Reyes; Dominican Republic	14.20A
400 metres hurdles	Julio Ferrer; Puerto Rico	51.4A	Carlos Yambot; Puerto Rico	51.4A	Rafael Echavarría; Mexico	51.5A
3000 metres steeplechase	Demetrio Cabanillos; Mexico	9:18.6A	Lucirio Garrido; Venezuela	9:18.7A	Octavio Guadarrama; Mexico	9:22.6A
4 × 100 metres relay	Dominican Republic; Gregorio García; Esteban Vázquez; Rafael Felix; Gerardo Suero	40.02A	Jamaica; Raymond Quarrie; Dennis Henry; Floyd Brown; Colin Bradford	40.17A	Puerto Rico; Luis Alers; Iván Mangual; Jesús Cabrera; Wilfredo Molina	40.72A
4 × 400 metres relay	Jamaica; Dennis Henry; Colin Bradford; Michael Barnes; Owen Hamilton	3:05.0A CR	Venezuela; Hipolito Brown; Edison Reyes; Humberto Galea; Erick Phillips	3:08.9A	Dominican Republic; Francisco Solis; Anatalio Ramírez; Gill Fortuna; Rafael Felix	3:11.9A
20 km road walk	Félix Gómez; Mexico	1:28:21A CR	Ernesto Canto; Mexico	1:28:53A	Rigoberto Medina; Cuba	1:34:41A
High jump	Jorge Alfaro; Cuba	2.25A CR	Cristóbal de León; Dominican Republic	2.17A	Rodolfo Madrigal; Costa Rica	2.12A
Pole vault	Rubén Camino; Cuba	5.05A CR	Edgardo Rivera; Puerto Rico	4.60A		
Long jump	Ray Quiñones; Puerto Rico	7.70A	Oswaldo Torres; Venezuela	7.61A	Ubaldo Duany; Cuba	7.30A
Triple jump	Ricardo Goitizolo; Cuba	15.97A	José Salazar; Venezuela	15.81A	Edgar Moreno; Venezuela	15.54A
Shot put	Nicolás Hernández; Cuba	18.49A CR	Bradley Cooper; Bahamas	18.35A	Humberto Calvario; Cuba	17.46A
Discus throw	José Santa Cruz; Cuba	62.48A CR	Bradley Cooper; Bahamas	61.24A	Luis Palacios; Venezuela	49.70A
Hammer throw	Alfredo Guillot; Cuba	62.10A	Ángel Cabrera; Cuba	58.52A	Luis Martínez; Puerto Rico	54.44A
Javelin throw	Reinaldo Patterson; Cuba	82.24A CR	Amado Morales; Puerto Rico	77.70A	Dionisio Quintana; Cuba	76.58A
Decathlon	Carlos Palacios; Cuba	6882A	Juan Ríos; Venezuela	6716A	Pedro Herrera; Cuba	6525A

=== Women's events ===
Event	Gold		Silver		Bronze	
100 metres	Lelieth Hodges; Jamaica	11.64A	Rosie Allwood; Jamaica	11.79A	Darcy Bryant; Costa Rica	11.96A
200 metres	Merlene Ottey; Jamaica	23.44A CR	Elsa Antúnez; Venezuela	24.34A	Divina Estrella; Dominican Republic	24.41A
400 metres	Debbie Byfield; Jamaica	54.29A	Carol Cummings; Jamaica	54.92A	Nancy Calveart; Cuba	55.02A
800 metres	María Ribeaux; Cuba	2:09.0A	Eloína Kerr; Cuba	2:09.3A	Ana Orendaín; Mexico	2:11.0A
1500 metres	Melquises Fonseca; Cuba	4:40.0A	Sergia Martínez; Cuba	4:41.2A	Angelita Lind; Puerto Rico	4:42.4A
3000 metres	Melquises Fonseca; Cuba	10:06.6A	Rosa Domínguez; Mexico	10:11.8A	Irma Hernández; Mexico	10:15.0A
100 metres hurdles	Lorlee Giscombe; Jamaica	14.28A	Marisela Peralta; Dominican Republic	14.44A	Maritza de la Guardia; Cuba	14.84A
400 metres hurdles	Marcela Chivás; Cuba	59.78A CR	Stephanie Vega; Puerto Rico	60.21A	Divina Estrella; Dominican Republic	62.43A
4 × 100 metres relay	Jamaica; Lelieth Hodges; Dorothy Scott; Rosie Allwood; Merlene Ottey	44.82A CR	Dominican Republic; Felicia Candelario; Divina Estrella; Teresa Almanzar; Ana Hotesse	46.79A	Puerto Rico; Georgina López; Nilsa París; Marie-Lande Mathieu; Madeline de Jesús	47.16A
4 × 400 metres relay	Cuba; Nancy Calveart; Eloína Kerr; María Ribeaux; Marcela Chibás	3:41.8A	Jamaica; Fredricka Wright; Carol Cummings; Debbie Byfield; Rosie Allwood	3:42.8A	Venezuela; Arelis Pulvet; Yaneth Carvajal; Elsa Antúnez; Adriana Marchena	3:45.9A
High jump	Silvia Costa; Cuba	1.80A	Elisa Ávila; Mexico	1.78A	Reina Mateu; Cuba	1.76A
Long jump	Emilia Lenk; Mexico	5.90A	Madeline de Jesús; Puerto Rico	5.87A	Odalys Herrera; Cuba	5.79A
Shot put	Rosa Fernández; Cuba	17.88A CR	Marcelina Rodríguez; Cuba	17.80A	Patricia Andrus; Venezuela	13.46A
Discus throw	Salvadora Vargas; Cuba	55.30A CR	Maritza Martén; Cuba	50.22A	Laura Aguiñaga; Mexico	44.90A
Javelin throw	Ana María González; Cuba	54.16A CR	Mayra Vila; Cuba	49.36A	Martha Blanco; Mexico	44.88A
Pentathlon	María Ángeles Cato; Mexico	3907A	Elida Aveillé; Cuba	3840A	Ansis Salazar; Cuba	3618A

A = affected by altitude

== Medal table ==
Rank	Nation	Gold	Silver	Bronze	Total
1	Cuba (CUB)	17	9	10	36
2	Jamaica (JAM)	9	5	0	14
3	Mexico (MEX)	8	5	7	20
4	Puerto Rico (PUR)	2	6	6	14
5	Dominican Republic (DOM)	1	5	5	11
6	Guatemala (GUA)	1	0	0	1
6	Panama (PAN)	1	0	0	1
8	Venezuela (VEN)	0	7	6	13
9	Bahamas (BAH)	0	2	0	2
10	Costa Rica (CRC)	0	0	3	3
11	British Virgin Islands (IVB)	0	0	1	1
Totals (11 entries)		39	39	38	116
