= 1977 Central American and Caribbean Championships in Athletics =

Held at the Estadio Heriberto Jara Corona in Xalapa, Mexico

- Dates: 5–7 August
- Host city: Xalapa, Veracruz, Mexico
- Venue: Estadio Heriberto Jara Corona

The 1977 Central American and Caribbean Championships in Athletics were held at the Estadio Heriberto Jara Corona in Xalapa, Mexico between 5–7 August.

== Medal summary ==
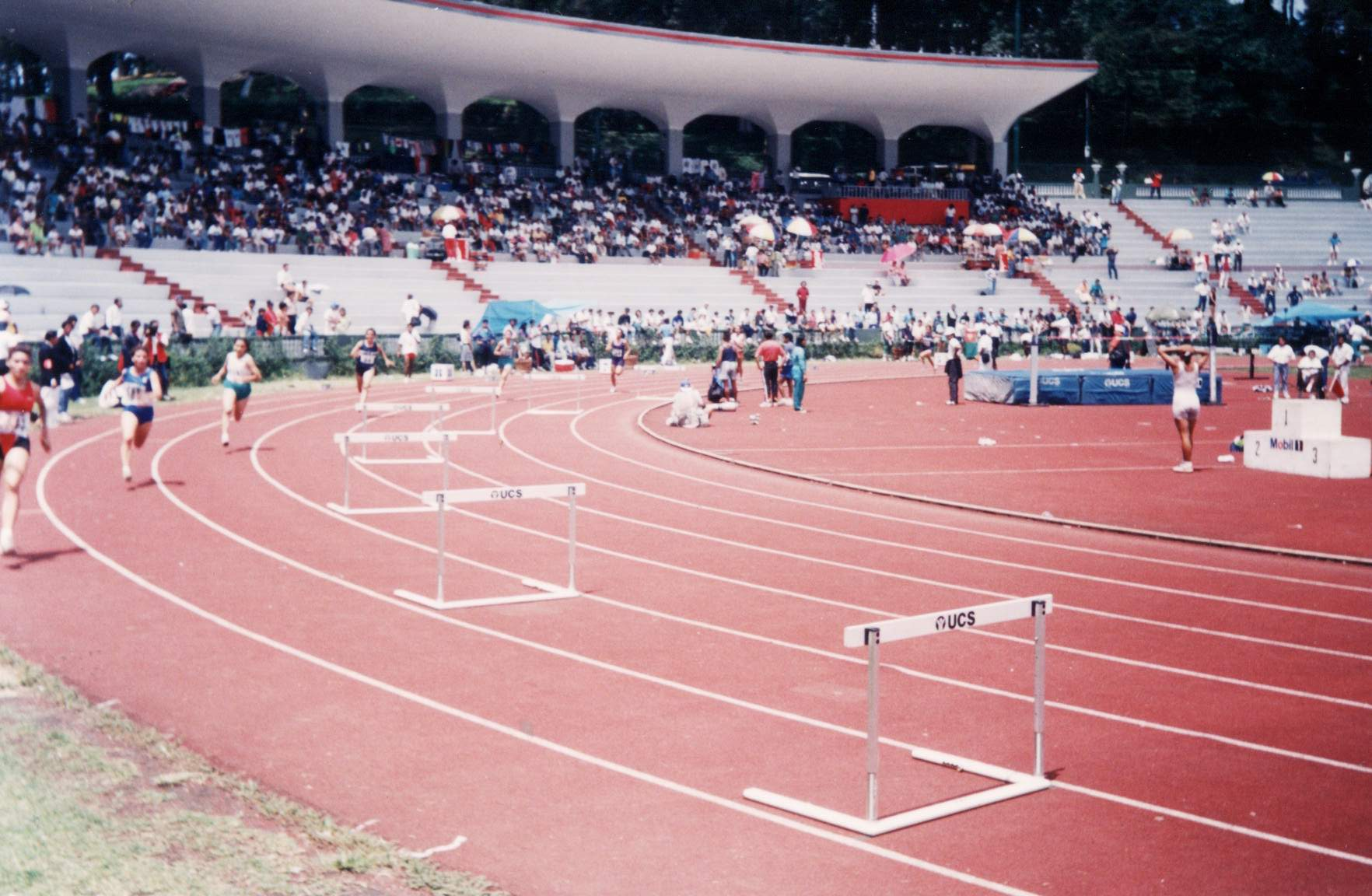
Host venue in Xalapa.

=== Men's events ===
Event	Gold		Silver		Bronze	
100 metres	Hasely Crawford; Trinidad and Tobago	10.38A	Silvio Leonard; Cuba	10.43A	Osvaldo Lara; Cuba	10.63A
200 metres	Silvio Leonard; Cuba	20.70A	Osvaldo Lara; Cuba	21.13A	Rudy Levarity; Bahamas	21.43A
400 metres	Seymour Newman; Jamaica	45.66A CR	Alberto Juantorena; Cuba	45.67A	Charles Joseph; Trinidad and Tobago	46.27A
800 metres	Seymour Newman; Jamaica	1:46.13A CR	Jorge Ortíz; Puerto Rico	1:48.67A	Eduardo Castro; Mexico	1:49.53A
1500 metres	Luis Medina; Cuba	3:46.71A	Eduardo Castro; Mexico	3:48.47A	Osmán Escobar; Venezuela	3:53.10A
5000 metres	Rodolfo Gómez; Mexico	14:04.9A	Domingo Tibaduiza; Colombia	14:05.0A	Victoriano López; Guatemala	14:09.8A
10,000 metres	Domingo Tibaduiza; Colombia	30:17.4A	Rodolfo Gómez; Mexico	30:17.5A	Rafael Ángel Pérez; Costa Rica	30:23.0A
Half marathon	Rafael Ángel Pérez; Costa Rica	1:06:32A	Mario Cuevas; Mexico	1:07:07A	Aldo Allen; Cuba	1:07:43A
110 metres hurdles	Alejandro Casañas; Cuba	13.55A CR	Dionisio Vera; Cuba	14.32A	José Cartas; Mexico	14.48A
400 metres hurdles	Dámaso Alfonso; Cuba	51.77A	Frank Montiéh; Cuba	51.81A	Enrique Aguirre; Mexico	52.30A
3000 metres steeplechase	Carlos Martínez; Mexico	8:51.0A	José Cobo; Cuba	9:01.1A	Lucirio Garrido; Venezuela	9:03.1A
4 × 100 metres relay	Cuba; Alejandro Casañas; Osvaldo Lara; Silvio Leonard; Juan Morales	39.86A	Trinidad and Tobago; Hasely Crawford; Charles Joseph; Edwin Noel; Ephraim Serrette	40.16A	Venezuela; Humberto Galea; José Chacín; Victor Escobar; Hipolito Ovalles	40.71A
4 × 400 metres relay	Cuba; Frank Montiéh; Juan Morales; Luis Delgado; Alberto Juantorena	3:09.24A	Venezuela; Hipolito Brown; Eric Phillips; Osman Escobar; José Moisés Zambrano	3:10.39A	Puerto Rico; Jorge Ortiz; Jesús Cabrera; José Santiago; Istvan de Jesús	3:11.78A
20 km road walk	Daniel Bautista; Mexico	1:29:34A CR	Enrique Vera; Mexico	1:34:48A	Rigoberto Medina; Cuba	1:40:04A
High jump	Richard Spencer; Cuba	2.15A CR	Clark Godwin; Bermuda	2.07A	Cristóbal de León; Dominican Republic	2.03A
Pole vault	Roberto Moré; Cuba	4.93A CR	Elberto Pratt; Mexico	4.75A	Luis Mascorro; Mexico	4.60A
Long jump	David Giralt; Cuba	7.96A CR	Salomón Rowe; Guatemala	7.79A NR	Steve Hanna; Bahamas	7.68A
Triple jump	Carmelo Martínez; Cuba	16.22A CR	Alejandro Herrera; Cuba	15.66A	Peter Pratt; Bahamas	15.42A
Shot put	Julián Mejías; Cuba	17.50A CR	Pablo Lamothe; Cuba	16.46A	Hubert Maingot; Trinidad and Tobago	15.72A
Discus throw	Julián Morrinson; Cuba	60.82A CR	Luis Delís; Cuba	59.02A	Bradley Cooper; Bahamas	54.08A
Hammer throw	Ángel Cabrera; Cuba	66.74A CR	Guillermo Orozco; Cuba	63.56A	Alfonso Rodríguez; Mexico	53.60A
Javelin throw	Juan Jarvis; Cuba	77.54A CR	Reinaldo Patterson; Cuba	74.82A	Robert Moulder; Bermuda	71.83A
Decathlon	Rigoberto Salazar; Cuba	7207A	José Montezuma; Venezuela	6791A	Doel Bonilla; Puerto Rico	6508A

=== Women's events ===
Event	Gold		Silver		Bronze	
100 metres	Silvia Chivás; Cuba	11.53A	Lelieth Hodges; Jamaica	11.71A	Isabel Taylor; Cuba	11.82A
200 metres	Silvia Chivás; Cuba	23.82A	Jackie Pusey; Jamaica	23.82A	Freida Davy; Barbados	24.05A
400 metres	Beatriz Castillo; Cuba	52.76A CR	Helen Blake; Jamaica	52.88A	Aurelia Pentón; Cuba	53.05A
800 metres	Charlotte Bradley; Mexico	2:07.46A	Helen Blake; Jamaica	2:08.87A	Aurelia Pentón; Cuba	2:09.13A
1500 metres	Charlotte Bradley; Mexico	4:29.65A	Melquises Fonseca; Cuba	4:42.06A	Thelma Zúñiga; Costa Rica	4:45.78A
3000 metres	Charlotte Bradley; Mexico	10:00.61A CR	Melquises Fonseca; Cuba	10:13.73A	Susana Herrera; Mexico	10:27.74A
100 metres hurdles	Grisel Machado; Cuba	14.30A	Carmen Zamora; Cuba	14.58A	Vilma París; Puerto Rico	14.81A
4 × 100 metres relay	Cuba; Asunción Acosta; Silvia Chivás; Isabel Taylor; Marta Zulueta	45.51A	Puerto Rico; Margaret de Jesús; Nilsa París; Vilma París; Nerva Bultron	46.93A	Trinidad and Tobago; Janice Bernard; June Smith; Esther Hope; Rebecca Roberts	47.20A
4 × 400 metres relay	Cuba; Nery McKeen; Asunción Acosta; Beatriz Castillo; Aurelia Pentón	3:37.50A CR	Jamaica; Helen Blake; Jackie Pusey; Verone Webber; Ruth Williams-Simpson	3:42.38A	Puerto Rico; Madeline de Jesús; Margaret de Jesús; Vilma París; Georgina López	3:48.57A
High jump	Angela Carbonell; Cuba	1.75A	Reina Mateu; Cuba	1.65A	Monica Johnson; Bermuda	1.60A
Long jump	Dora Thompson; Cuba	6.14A CR	Shonel Ferguson; Bahamas	5.95A	Nancy Núñez; Cuba	5.91A
Shot put	Caridad Romero; Cuba	13.94A	Marcelina Rodríguez; Cuba	13.88A	Patricia Andrus; Venezuela	12.60A
Discus throw	Caridad Romero; Cuba	49.58A	Salvadora Vargas; Cuba	48.92A	María Gómez; Mexico	40.22A
Javelin throw	María Beltrán; Cuba	53.86A CR	Guadalupe López; Mexico	48.56A	Sonya Smith; Bermuda	46.72A
Pentathlon	Elida Aveillé; Cuba	3313A	Marisela Peralta; Dominican Republic	3303A	Evelyn Abreu; Venezuela	3289A

A = affected by altitude

== Medal table ==
Rank	Nation	Gold	Silver	Bronze	Total
1	Cuba (CUB)	27	17	7	51
2	Mexico (MEX)	6	6	7	19
3	Jamaica (JAM)	2	5	0	7
4	Trinidad and Tobago (TTO)	1	1	3	5
5	Colombia (COL)	1	1	0	2
6	Costa Rica (CRC)	1	0	2	3
7	Venezuela (VEN)	0	2	5	7
8	Puerto Rico (PUR)	0	2	4	6
9	Bahamas (BAH)	0	1	4	5
10	Bermuda (BER)	0	1	3	4
11	Dominican Republic (DOM)	0	1	1	2
11	Guatemala (GUA)	0	1	1	2
13	Barbados (BAR)	0	0	1	1
Totals (13 entries)		38	38	38	114
