= Margaret de Jesús =

Puerto Rican sprinter

Personal information
- Born: November 4, 1957 (age 68) Brooklyn, New York, U.S.
- Height: 167 cm (5 ft 6 in)
- Weight: 55 kg (121 lb)
Medal record
Women's athletics
Representing Puerto Rico
Central American and Caribbean Games
Silver medal – second place	1982 Havana	4 × 400 m relay
Central American and Caribbean Championships
Bronze medal – third place	1977 Jalapa	4 × 400 m relay
Silver medal – second place	1983 Havana	4 × 100 m relay
Silver medal – second place	1983 Havana	4 × 400 m relay

Margaret de Jesús Candelaria (born November 4, 1957, in Brooklyn, New York) is Puerto Rican former sprinter who competed internationally in relay events during the late 1970s and 1980s. She got a silver medal in the 4 × 100-meter relay at the 1982 Central American and Caribbean Games in Havana alongside teammates Stephanie Vega, Nilsa Paris, and Marie Lande Mathieu.

De Jesús is known for a scandal at the 1984 Los Angeles Olympics, where she acted as an imposter for her injured identical twin sister, Madeline. Margaret secretly ran the second leg of the 4 × 400-meter relay qualifying heat to help Puerto Rico advance, but the head coach withdrew the team from the final upon discovering the situation.

== Career ==
Her sole global competition appearance came at the 1984 Summer Olympics, where she competed on the Puerto Rican women's 4 × 400 meters relay team. The team did not make the final.

In 1982, at 31.36,52 seconds, she won the silver medal in the 4 × 100 meters relay at the 1982 Central American and Caribbean Games with her teammates, Stephanie Vega, Nilsa Paris, and Marie Mathieu, losing to Cuba, followed by Jamaica..

== Olympic controversy ==
After Puerto Rico’s Madeline de Jesus came up lame while competing in the long jump, she was unable to run in the 4×400-meter relay at the 1984 Los Angeles Games. Madeline enlisted her identical twin sister, Margaret, as an imposter for a qualifying heat. Margaret ran the second leg of the qualifier, and the team advanced. When the Puerto Rican team's chief coach learned of the ruse, however, he pulled his team out of the final.Her twin sister, Madeline de Jesús, also competed at the 1984 Summer Olympics and won a number of international medals during her career as a long jumper. Both were born in Brooklyn, New York, and raised in Río Piedras.
