= Athletics at the 1979 Pan American Games – Women's 200 metres =

Women's 200 metres at the 1979 Pan American Games
- Venue: Estadio Sixto Escobar
- Dates: 9 & 11 July
- Winning time: 22.24

Medalists
Gold medal	Evelyn Ashford	United States
Silver medal	Angella Taylor	Canada
Bronze medal	Merlene Ottey	Jamaica

The women's 200 metres sprint competition of the athletics events at the 1979 Pan American Games took place on 9 and 11 July at the Estadio Sixto Escobar. The defending Pan American Games champion was Chandra Cheeseborough of the United States.

== Records ==
Prior to this competition, the existing world and Pan American Games records were as follows:

World record	Marita Koch (GDR)	21.71	Karl-Marx-Stadt, East Germany	June 10, 1979
Pan American Games record	Chandra Cheeseborough (USA)	22.77	Mexico City, Mexico	1975

== Results ==
All times shown are in seconds. Evelyn Ashford's mark in the final was not considered a new Pan American record because of favorable wind of 2.12 m/s.

KEY:	WR	World Record	GR	Pan American Record

=== Heats ===
Held on 9 July

Wind:
Heat 1: +4.7 m/s, Heat 2: +2.8 m/s, Heat 3: +2.3 m/s

Rank	Heat	Name	Nationality	Time	Notes
1	1	Evelyn Ashford	United States	22.51	Q
2	2	Merlene Ottey	Jamaica	22.92	Q
3	3	Valerie Brisco	United States	22.95	Q
4	1	Angella Taylor	Canada	23.17	Q
5	1	Jacqueline Pusey	Jamaica	23.42	Q
6	3	Silvia Chivás	Cuba	23.50	Q
7	3	Candy Ford	Bermuda	23.77	Q
8	1	Sheila de Oliveira	Brazil	24.02	Q
9	2	Beatriz Allocco	Argentina	24.09	Q
10	3	Carmela Bolívar	Peru	24.43	Q
11	2	Isabel Taylor	Cuba	24.70	Q
12	3	Nilsa Paris	Puerto Rico	24.71	Q
13	1	Denise Muller	Virgin Islands	24.91	Q
14	2	Sueli Machado	Brazil	25.05	Q
15	1	Teresa Almánzar	Dominican Republic	25.08	q
16	2	Divina Estrella	Dominican Republic	25.42	Q
17	3	Brenda Gordon	Virgin Islands	25.83	

=== Semifinals ===
Held on 9 July

Wind:
Heat 1: +1.7 m/s, Heat 2: +2.5 m/s

Rank	Heat	Name	Nationality	Time	Notes
1	1	Evelyn Ashford	United States	22.45	Q
2	1	Angella Taylor	Canada	22.80	Q
3	2	Valerie Brisco	United States	23.13	Q
4	2	Merlene Ottey	Jamaica	23.13	Q
5	2	Silvia Chivás	Cuba	23.30	Q
6	1	Jacqueline Pusey	Jamaica	23.34	Q
7	1	Beatriz Allocco	Argentina	23.88	Q
8	2	Candy Ford	Bermuda	23.95	Q
9	1	Sheila de Oliveira	Brazil	24.14	
10	2	Sueli Machado	Brazil	24.32	
11	2	Carmela Bolívar	Peru	24.38	
12	1	Divina Estrella	Dominican Republic	24.39	
13	1	Isabel Taylor	Cuba	24.39	
14	2	Nilsa Paris	Puerto Rico	24.58	
15	2	Teresa Almánzar	Dominican Republic	25.13	
16	1	Denise Muller	Virgin Islands	25.31	

=== Final ===
Held on 11 July

Wind: +2.2 m/s

Rank	Name	Nationality	Time	Notes
1st place, gold medalist(s)	Evelyn Ashford	United States	22.24	
2nd place, silver medalist(s)	Angella Taylor	Canada	22.74	
3rd place, bronze medalist(s)	Merlene Ottey	Jamaica	22.79	
4	Valerie Brisco	United States	22.84	
5	Jacqueline Pusey	Jamaica	23.08	
6	Candy Ford	Bermuda	23.70	
7	Silvia Chivás	Cuba	23.79	
8	Beatriz Allocco	Argentina	23.99	
