= Silvia Chivás =

Cuban athletics competitor

Personal information
- Nickname: La Gacela del Guaso
- Born: September 10, 1954 (age 71) Guantanamo, Cuba
- Height: 1.57 m (5 ft 2 in)
- Weight: 58 kg (128 lb)
Medal record
Women's Athletics
Representing Cuba
Olympic Games
| Bronze medal – third place | 1972 Munich | 100 metres |
| Bronze medal – third place | 1972 Munich | 4x100 m relay |
Pan American Games
| Silver medal – second place | 1971 Cali | 4x100 m relay |
| Silver medal – second place | 1975 Mexico City | 4x100 m relay |
| Bronze medal – third place | 1971 Cali | 100 metres |
| Bronze medal – third place | 1979 San Juan | 4x100 m relay |
Central American and Caribbean Games
| Gold medal – first place | 1978 Medellín | 100 metres |
| Gold medal – first place | 1978 Medellín | 200 metres |
| Gold medal – first place | 1978 Medellín | 4x100 m relay |
| Silver medal – second place | 1974 Santo Domingo | 100 metres |
Summer Universiade
| Gold medal – first place | 1977 Sofia | 200 metres |
| Bronze medal – third place | 1977 Sofia | 100 metres |
Representing Americas
World Cup
| Bronze medal – third place | 1977 Düsseldorf | 100 metres |

Silvia Chivás Baró (born September 10, 1954) is a Cuban former sprinter who was an Olympic double-medalist, she won two bronze medals at the 1972 Summer Olympics in Munich, finishing third in both the individual 100-meter dash and the 4 × 100-meter relay alongside teammates Carmen Valdés, Fulgencia Romay, and Marlene Elejarde. On the continental stage, Chivás achieved the same achievement at the 1971 Pan American Games in Cali, where she won a silver medal in the 4 × 100-meter relay and a bronze medal in the 100 meters.

== Early life and career ==
She was born on 10 September 1954 in Guantánamo.

In 1971, she won a silver medal in the 4 × 100 meters relay at the 1971 Pan American Games in 45.0 seconds with Carmen Valdés, Fulgencia Romay, and Marlene Elejarde, losing to the team from the United States of America in 44.5 seconds, consisting of Orien Brown, Pat Hawkins, Mattiline Render, and Iris Davis, followed by Colombia in 45.9 seconds, consisting of Aida Ortíz, Ana Maquilón, Elsy Rivas, and Juana Mosquera. She also competed in the 100 m sprint and won a bronze medal, running 11.4 seconds, losing to Davis (11.2) and Stephanie Berto (11.4).

Then, she competed in the 1972 Summer Olympics and won bronze medal in the same sport with the same team that competed the 1971 Pan American Games finishing in 43.360 seconds and their team loses to Federal Republic of Germany that consist of Ingrid Becker, Annegret Richter Heide Rosendahl and Christiane Krause that won gold in 42.810 seconds followed after German Democratic Republic in 42.950 seconds consist of Christina Heinich, Bärbel Struppert Renate Stecher and Evelin Kaufer. At the event, she also competed in the 100 meters sprint and won a bronze medal at 11.24 seconds, losing to Renate Stecher at 11.07 seconds and Raelene Boyle at 11.23 seconds.

== International competitions ==
| Year | Competition | Venue | Position | Event | Notes |
Representing Cuba
| 1971 | Central American and Caribbean Championships | Kingston, Jamaica | 2nd | 100 m | 11.6 |
| 1971 | Central American and Caribbean Championships | Kingston, Jamaica | 2nd | 200 m | 23.9 |
| 1971 | Central American and Caribbean Championships | Kingston, Jamaica | 1st | 4 × 100 m relay | 45.4 |
| 1971 | Pan American Games | Cali, Colombia | 3rd | 100 m | 11.47 |
| 1971 | Pan American Games | Cali, Colombia | 4th | 200 m | 23.95 |
| 1971 | Pan American Games | Cali, Colombia | 2nd | 4 × 100 m relay | 45.01 |
| 1972 | Olympic Games | Munich, West Germany | 3rd | 100 m | 11.24 |
| 1972 | Olympic Games | Munich, West Germany | 3rd | 4 × 100 m relay | 43.36 |
| 1973 | Central American and Caribbean Championships | Maracaibo, Venezuela | 1st | 100 m | 11.4 |
| 1973 | Central American and Caribbean Championships | Maracaibo, Venezuela | 1st | 200 m | 23.5 |
| 1973 | Central American and Caribbean Championships | Maracaibo, Venezuela | 1st | 4 × 100 m relay | 45.9 |
| 1973 | Universiade | Moscow, Soviet Union | 4th | 100 m | 11.66 |
| 1973 | Universiade | Moscow, Soviet Union | 12th (sf) | 200 m | 24.1 |
| 1974 | Central American and Caribbean Games | Santo Domingo, Dominican Republic | 2nd | 100 m | 11.65 |
| 1974 | Central American and Caribbean Games | Santo Domingo, Dominican Republic | 1st | 4 × 100 m relay | 44.90 |
| 1975 | Pan American Games | Mexico City, Mexico | 4th | 100 m | 11.45 |
| 1975 | Pan American Games | Mexico City, Mexico | 5th | 200 m | 23.33 |
| 1975 | Pan American Games | Mexico City, Mexico | 2nd | 4 × 100 m relay | 43.65 |
| 1976 | Olympic Games | Montreal, Canada | 15th (sf) | 100 m | 11.43 |
| 1976 | Olympic Games | Montreal, Canada | 10th (h) | 4 × 100 m relay | 44.29 |
| 1977 | Central American and Caribbean Championships | Xalapa, Mexico | 1st | 100 m | 11.53 |
| 1977 | Central American and Caribbean Championships | Xalapa, Mexico | 1st | 200 m | 23.82 |
| 1977 | Central American and Caribbean Championships | Xalapa, Mexico | 1st | 4 × 100 m relay | 45.51 |
| 1977 | Universiade | Sofia, Bulgaria | 3rd | 100 m | 11.23 |
| 1977 | Universiade | Sofia, Bulgaria | 1st | 200 m | 23.08 |
| 1977 | Universiade | Sofia, Bulgaria | 4th | 4 × 100 m relay | 44.81 |
| 1977 | World Cup | Düsseldorf, West Germany | 3rd | 100 m | 11.34^{1} |
| 1977 | World Cup | Düsseldorf, West Germany | 5th | 200 m | 23.45^{1} |
| 1977 | World Cup | Düsseldorf, West Germany | 4th | 4 × 100 m relay | 42.95^{1} |
| 1978 | Central American and Caribbean Games | Medellín, Colombia | 1st | 100 m | 11.47 |
| 1978 | Central American and Caribbean Games | Medellín, Colombia | 1st | 200 m | 23.01 |
| 1978 | Central American and Caribbean Games | Medellín, Colombia | 1st | 4 × 100 m relay | 44.37 |
| 1979 | Pan American Games | San Juan, Puerto Rico | 4th | 100 m | 11.48 |
| 1979 | Pan American Games | San Juan, Puerto Rico | 7th | 200 m | 23.79 (w) |
| 1979 | Pan American Games | San Juan, Puerto Rico | 3rd | 4 × 100 m relay | 46.26 |
| 1979 | World Cup | Montreal, Canada | 5th | 4 × 100 m relay | 43.99^{1} |

^{1}Representing the Americas

== Personal bests ==
- 100 metres – 11.16 (1977)
