= Andrew Bruce (athlete) =

Trinidad and Tobago sprinter

- Born: 7 December 1958 (age 66); Trinidad
- Occupation: Sprinter
- Known for: 1980 Summer Olympics

Andrew Bruce (born 7 December 1958) is a retired athlete from Trinidad and Tobago who specialised in the 200 metres.

== Biography ==
=== Career ===
Bruce represented Trinidad at the 1980 Moscow Olympics in the 200 metres, where he reached the semifinals. Andrew Bruce, who ran the 220 leg on U of M's world record setting sprint medley relay team in 1979, represented Trinidad and Tobago in the 200 meters sprint and 4x100 meter relay. He won his first heat in the 200 in a time of :21.35 and placed fourth in the second round at :20.9 He anchored the 400 meter relay team to a 5th-place finish, just .03 seconds behind Jamaica and a spot in the finals. Bruce returned to school to capture Big Ten titles in the 60 and 300 yard dash (indoor) and the 100 and 200 meter dash (outdoor) in 1981 and 1982.

=== Education ===
Andrew Bruce was inducted into the University of Michigan Track and Field Hall of Fame.

Andrew Bruce from Trinidad and Tobago specialized in the 200-meter dash for the U-M track and field team 1979-1982. He represented Trinidad at the 1980 Moscow Olympics in the 200-meter, reaching the semifinals.

At Michigan, Bruce captured eight Big Ten titles in four events: the 60- and 300-yard dashes (indoor) and the 100- and 200-meter dashes (outdoor) in 1981 and 1982. Bruce ran the 220-meter leg on U-M's world record setting sprint medley relay team in 1979 and represented Trinidad and Tobago in the 200-meter sprint and 4x100 meter relay. He won his first heat in the 200m with a time of 21.35 and placed fourth in the second round at 20.9. He anchored the 400-meter relay team to a fifth-place finish—just .03 seconds behind Jamaica to earn a spot in the finals.

== Achievements ==
Year	Tournament	Venue	Result	Extra
1982	Central American and Caribbean Games	Havana, Cuba	4th	200 m
	Central American and Caribbean Games	Havana, Cuba	3rd	4 × 400 m relay
1983	Pan American Games	Caracas, Venezuela	7th	200 m
	Pan American Games	Caracas, Venezuela	5th	4 × 100 m relay
	Pan American Games	Caracas, Venezuela	4th	4 × 400 m relay
