= Guy Hill =

Sprinter from the British Virgin Islands

Guy Hill (born 14 December 1959, in Road Town, Tortola) is a former sprinter from the British Virgin Islands. Hill's measurements at the time of the Olympics were 182 cm and 67 kg.

Hill was part of the first ever team to represent British Virgin Islands at the Summer Olympics when he competed in the 1984 Summer Olympics. He entered the 100 metres sprint and in his heat he ran a time of 11.11 seconds and finished 6th out of seven runners. He also entered the 4x400 metres relay and again finished 6th in the heat.
