= Athletics at the 1978 Central American and Caribbean Games =

Athletics at the XIII CAC Games
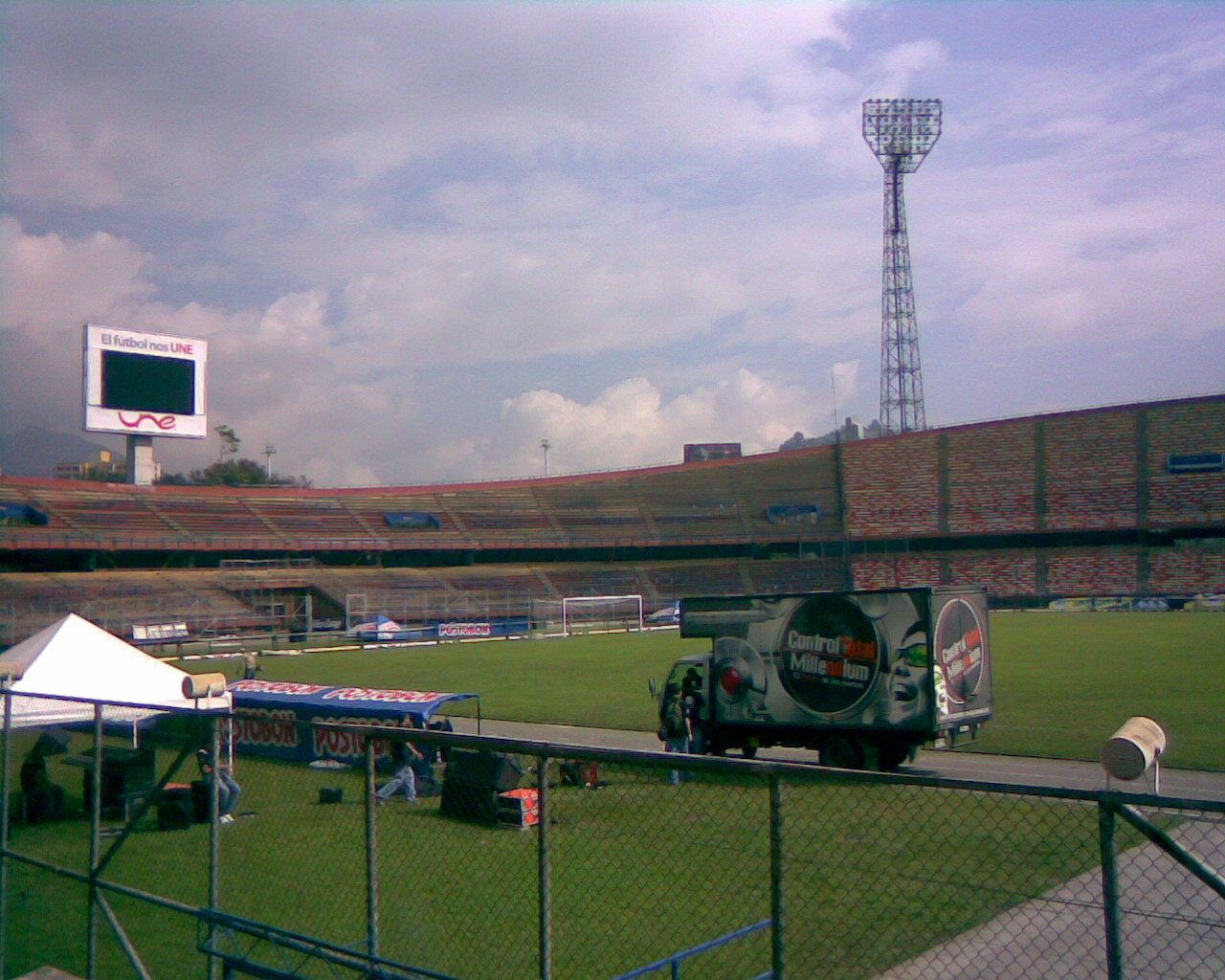
- Host stadium (shown in 2011)
- Dates: 15–20 July 1978
- Host city: Medellín, Colombia
- Venue: Estadio Atanasio Girardot
- Events: 37
- Participation: 19 nations

The athletics competition at the 1978 Central American and Caribbean Games was held at the Estadio Atanasio Girardot in Medellín, Colombia.

It was the first time that women's 1500 metres and 4 × 400 metres relay events were held at the Games. It was also the last appearance of women's pentathlon before being replaced by the heptathlon from the next edition on.

== Medal summary ==
=== Men's events ===
Event	Gold		Silver		Bronze	
100 metres	Silvio Leonard; Cuba	10.10 GR	Osvaldo Lara; Cuba	10.11	Guy Abrahams; Panama	10.20
200 metres	Silvio Leonard; Cuba	20.49 GR	Anthony Husbands; Trinidad and Tobago	21.00	Guy Abrahams; Panama	21.15
400 metres	Alberto Juantorena; Cuba	44.27 GR	Joseph Coombs; Trinidad and Tobago	45.41	Seymour Newman; Jamaica	46.11
800 metres	Alberto Juantorena; Cuba	1:47.23 GR	Gerold Pawirodikromo; Suriname	1:47.46	Leandro Civil; Cuba	1:47.66
1500 metres	Luis Medina; Cuba	3:44.47	Eduardo Castro; Mexico	3:45.14	Osmán Escobar; Venezuela	3:45.89
5000 metres	Rodolfo Gómez; Mexico	13:55.08	Domingo Tibaduiza; Colombia	13:56.88	José Gómez; Mexico	14:27.33
10,000 metres	Rodolfo Gómez; Mexico	29:34.64 GR	Domingo Tibaduiza; Colombia	29:38.66	Luis Hernández; Mexico	30:23.84
Marathon	Radamés Vega; Puerto Rico	2:22:34 GR	Mario Cuevas; Mexico	2:23:07	José Granajo; Guatemala	2:26:04
110 metres hurdles	Alejandro Casañas; Cuba	13.67 GR	Mariano Reyes; Dominican Republic	14.68	Karl Smith; Jamaica	14.71
400 metres hurdles	Clive Barriffe; Jamaica	50.16 GR	Julio Ferrer; Puerto Rico	50.86	Alexis Misignak; Cuba	50.97
3000 metres steeplechase	José Cobo; Cuba	8:46.39 GR	Carlos Martínez; Mexico	8:52.13	Jaime Villate; Colombia	8:56.29
4 × 100 metres relay	Trinidad and Tobago; Eldwin Noel; Hasely Crawford; Anthony Husbands; Ephraim Serrette	39.13 GR	Cuba; Juan Saborit; Alejandro Casañas; Silvio Leonard; Osvaldo Lara	39.44	Dominican Republic; Juan Contreras; Gregorio García; Enrique Almarante; Rafael Félix	39.62
4 × 400 metres relay	Jamaica; Clive Barriffe; Oliver Heywood; Floyd Brown; Bert Cameron	3:03.76 GR	Trinidad and Tobago; Anthony Myers; Michael Paul; Mike Solomon; Joseph Coombs	3:05.01	Cuba; Alexis Misignak; Ernesto Vinent; Carlos Álvarez; Alberto Juantorena	3:05.57
20 kilometre road walk	Daniel Bautista; Mexico	1:29:10 GR	Raúl González; Mexico	1:31:58	Jorge Quiñones; Colombia	1:39:31
High jump	Richard Spencer; Cuba	2.12 GR	Rodolfo Madrigal; Costa Rica	2.12 =GR	Jamil Justiniano; Puerto Rico	2.09
Pole vault	Augusto Perdomo; Cuba	5.00 GR	Elberto Pratt; Mexico	4.80	Rubén Camino; Cuba	4.80
Long jump	David Giralt; Cuba	7.82 GR	Milán Matos; Cuba	7.77	Ron Chambers; Jamaica	7.77
Triple jump	Steve Hanna; Bahamas	16.60 GR	Juan Velázquez; Cuba	16.43	Alejandro Herrera; Cuba	16.10
Shot put	Humberto Calvario; Cuba	17.51 GR	Nicolás Hernández; Cuba	17.36	Jesús Ramos; Venezuela	16.83
Discus throw	Luis Delís; Cuba	58.62 GR	Julián Morrinson; Cuba	58.56	Brad Cooper; Bahamas	54.24
Hammer throw	Armando Orozco; Cuba	69.86 GR	Genovevo Morejón; Cuba	69.14	Luis Martínez; Puerto Rico	56.22
Javelin throw	Antonio González; Cuba	78.74 GR	Amado Morales; Puerto Rico	70.54	Reinaldo Patterson; Cuba	63.64
Decathlon	Rigoberto Salazar; Cuba	7483 GR	Miguel Subarnaba; Cuba	6954	José Montezuma; Venezuela	6842

=== Women's events ===
Event	Gold		Silver		Bronze	
100 metres	Silvia Chivás; Cuba	11.47	Lelieth Hodges; Jamaica	11.63	Isabel Taylor; Cuba	11.74
200 metres	Silvia Chivás; Cuba	23.01 GR	Janice Bernard; Trinidad and Tobago	24.01	Maureen Gottshalk; Jamaica	24.42
400 metres	Aurelia Pentón; Cuba	50.56 GR	Beatriz Castillo; Cuba	51.27	Helen Blake; Jamaica	53.40
800 metres	Aurelia Pentón; Cuba	2:01.38 GR	Charlotte Bradley; Mexico	2:03.58	Nery McKeen; Cuba	2:04.48
1500 metres	Charlotte Bradley; Mexico	4:30.78 GR	Ileana Hocking; Puerto Rico	4:35.88	Susana Herrera; Mexico	4:39.62
100 metres hurdles	Grisel Machado; Cuba	13.31 GR	Marisela Peralta; Dominican Republic	14.23	Carmen Zamora; Cuba	14.29
4 × 100 metres relay	Cuba; Grisel Machado; Silvia Chivás; Carmen Valdés; Isabel Taylor	44.37 GR	Jamaica; Leleith Hodges; Dorothy Scott; Maureen Gottschalk; Jacqueline Pusey	44.41	Trinidad and Tobago; Rebeca Roberts; Joane Gardner; Janice Bernard; Esther Hope	45.13
4 × 400 metres relay	Cuba; Ana Guibert; Ana Fidelia Quirot; Beatriz Castillo; Aurelia Pentón	3:31.34 GR	Jamaica; Ruth Williams-Simpson; Norma Lee; Maureen Gottschalk; Helen Blake	3:41.69	Puerto Rico; Angelita Lind; Ileana Hocking; Madeline de Jesús; Vilma Paris	3:46.58
High jump	Angela Carbonell; Cuba	1.75 GR	Grace Jackson; Jamaica	1.70	Elisa Ávila; Mexico	1.65
Long jump	Shonel Ferguson; Bahamas	6.41	Ana Alexander; Cuba	6.25	Eloína Echevarría; Cuba	6.12
Shot put	Hilda Ramírez; Cuba	17.00 GR	Marcelina Rodríguez; Cuba	14.97	Vicky López; Puerto Rico	13.42
Discus throw	Carmen Romero; Cuba	60.54 GR	María Cristina Betancourt; Cuba	57.58	Selene Saldarriaga; Colombia	41.28
Javelin throw	María Caridad Colón; Cuba	63.40 GR	María Beltrán; Cuba	54.86	Guadalupe López; Mexico	49.80
Pentathlon	Elida Aveillé; Cuba	3636	Alix Castillo; Venezuela	3625	Laura Vázquez; Mexico	3511

== Medal table ==
Rank	Nation	Gold	Silver	Bronze	Total
1	Cuba (CUB)	27	13	9	49
2	Mexico (MEX)	4	6	6	16
3	Jamaica (JAM)	2	4	5	11
4	Bahamas (BAH)	2	0	1	3
5	Trinidad and Tobago (TTO)	1	4	1	6
6	Puerto Rico (PUR)	1	3	4	8
7	Colombia (COL)	0	2	4	6
8	Dominican Republic (DOM)	0	2	1	3
9	Venezuela (VEN)	0	1	3	4
10	Costa Rica (CRC)	0	1	0	1
10	Suriname (SUR)	0	1	0	1
12	Panama (PAN)	0	0	2	2
13	Guatemala (GUA)	0	0	1	1
Totals (13 entries)		37	37	37	111
