= 1982 Central American and Caribbean Games =

Sports events held in Havana, Cuba

XIV Central American and Caribbean Sports Games
- Host city: Havana
- Country: Cuba
- Edition: 14th
- Nations: 25
- Athletes: 2,420
- Opening: 7 August 1982
- Closing: 18 August 1982
- Opened by: Fidel Castro
- Athlete's Oath: Alberto Juantorena
- Torch lighter: María Caridad Colón
- Main venue: Estadio Pedro Marrero

The 14th Central American and Caribbean Games were held in Havana, Cuba from August 7 to August 18, 1982, and included 2,420 athletes from nineteen nations competing in 25 different sports. Some events were held in Santiago de Cuba, Cienfuegos, and the eastern end of the island.

The Games were originally awarded to Mayagüez, Puerto Rico get the hosted in 2010, which withdrew from organising in 1981. Havana stepped up to host the Games for the second time, the first being in 1930.

== Opening ==
The torch was carried by María Caridad Colón.

== Mascot ==
The mascot for the Games was Cuco, the Crocodile.

== Sports ==
The Games had 24 sports.

- Athletics ()
- Archery () (first appearance)
- Basketball ()
- Baseball ()
- Boxing ()
- Canoeing ()
- Cycling ()
- Diving ()
- Fencing ()
- Field hockey () (first appearance)
- Football ()
- Gymnastics ()
- Rowing () (first appearance)
- Sailing ()
- Shooting ()
- Swimming ()
- Softball ()
- Synchronized swimming ()
- Table tennis () (first appearance)
- Tennis ()
- Volleyball ()
- Water polo ()
- Weightlifting ()
- Wrestling ()

== Notable results ==
- The Dominicans best the Cubans in baseball.
- A snatch world record was set by Cuban Daniel Núñez.

== Medal table ==
* Host nation (Cuba)

1982 Central American and Caribbean Games medal table
Rank	Nation	Gold	Silver	Bronze	Total
1	Cuba*	173	71	38	282
2	Mexico	29	55	47	131
3	Venezuela	19	39	54	112
4	Puerto Rico	7	43	54	104
5	Dominican Republic	4	8	22	34
6	Jamaica	4	3	6	13
7	Costa Rica	3	1	4	8
8	Virgin Islands	2	5	4	11
9	Bahamas	2	3	4	9
10	Guatemala	2	1	6	9
11	Trinidad and Tobago	1	2	6	9
12	Guyana	1	0	1	2
13	Haiti	1	0	0	1
14	Panama	0	11	9	20
15	Nicaragua	0	3	5	8
16	Belize	0	1	0	1
17	Netherlands Antilles	0	0	3	3
18	Barbados	0	0	2	2
18	Bermuda	0	0	2	2
18	Grenada	0	0	2	2
21	Suriname	0	0	1	1
Totals (21 entries)		248	246	270	764
