= Athletics at the 1986 Central American and Caribbean Games – Results =

These are the full results of the athletics competition at the 1986 Central American and Caribbean Games which took place between 29 June and 4 July 1986, at the Estadio La Barranquita in Santiago de los Caballeros, Dominican Republic.

== Men's results ==
=== 100 metres ===
Heats – 29 June
Wind:
Heat 1: -0.2 m/s, Heat 2: -0.8 m/s, Heat 3: -0.1 m/s

| Rank | Heat | Name | Nationality | Time | Notes |
|---|---|---|---|---|---|
| 1 | 1 | Andrés Simón | Cuba | 10.30 | Q |
| 2 | 1 | Ray Stewart | Jamaica | 10.36 | Q |
| 3 | 3 | Juan Núñez | Dominican Republic | 10.44 | Q |
| 4 | 3 | Greg Meghoo | Jamaica | 10.53 | Q |
| 5 | 2 | Gerardo Suero | Dominican Republic | 10.54 | Q |
| 6 | 2 | Osvaldo Lara | Cuba | 10.55 | Q |
| 7 | 3 | Fabian Whymns | Bahamas | 10.60 | Q |
| 8 | 3 | Ronnell Barclay | Trinidad and Tobago | 10.64 | Q |
| 9 | 2 | Luis Morales | Puerto Rico | 10.65 | Q |
| 10 | 2 | Greg Barnes | United States Virgin Islands | 10.70 | Q |
| 11 | 1 | Humberto Newball | Nicaragua | 10.75 | Q |
| 12 | 1 | Luis Smith | Panama | 10.81 | Q |
| 13 | 3 | Víctor Andino | Puerto Rico | 10.83 | q |
| 14 | 2 | Florencio Aguilar | Panama | 10.87 | q |
| 15 | 2 | Henrico Atkins | Barbados | 11.07 | q |
| 16 | 3 | Alvin Reiter | Netherlands Antilles | 11.28 | q |
| 17 | 3 | Kevin Clarke | United States Virgin Islands | 11.52 | |
| 18 | 1 | Frensel Martiin | Netherlands Antilles | 11.66 | |
| | 1 | Lester Benjamin | Antigua and Barbuda | DNS | |

Semifinals – 29 June
Wind:
Heat 1: +0.2 m/s, Heat 2: -0.4 m/s

| Rank | Heat | Name | Nationality | Time | Notes |
|---|---|---|---|---|---|
| 1 | 2 | Andrés Simón | Cuba | 10.22 | Q |
| 2 | 1 | Juan Núñez | Dominican Republic | 10.31 | Q |
| 3 | 1 | Ray Stewart | Jamaica | 10.33 | Q |
| 4 | 2 | Fabian Whymns | Bahamas | 10.38 | Q |
| 5 | 2 | Gerardo Suero | Dominican Republic | 10.38 | Q |
| 6 | 2 | Luis Morales | Puerto Rico | 10.39 | q |
| 7 | 2 | Greg Meghoo | Jamaica | 10.40 | q |
| 8 | 1 | Osvaldo Lara | Cuba | 10.44 | Q |
| 9 | 2 | Greg Barnes | United States Virgin Islands | 10.53 | |
| 10 | 1 | Ronnell Barclay | Trinidad and Tobago | 10.58 | |
| 11 | 2 | Luis Smith | Panama | 10.68 | |
| 12 | 1 | Florencio Aguilar | Panama | 10.72 | |
| 13 | 1 | Víctor Andino | Puerto Rico | 10.81 | |
| 14 | 1 | Humberto Newball | Nicaragua | 10.83 | |
| 15 | 1 | Alvin Reiter | Netherlands Antilles | 11.26 | |
| | 2 | Henrico Atkins | Barbados | DNF | |

Final – 30 June
Wind: -1.6 m/s

| Rank | Name | Nationality | Time | Notes |
|---|---|---|---|---|
| 1st place, gold medalist(s) | Andrés Simón | Cuba | 10.29 | |
| 2nd place, silver medalist(s) | Juan Núñez | Dominican Republic | 10.38 | |
| 3rd place, bronze medalist(s) | Ray Stewart | Jamaica | 10.48 | |
| 4 | Luis Morales | Puerto Rico | 10.49 | |
| 5 | Osvaldo Lara | Cuba | 10.51 | |
| 6 | Fabian Whymns | Bahamas | 10.54 | |
| 7 | Greg Meghoo | Jamaica | 10.55 | |
| 8 | Gerardo Suero | Dominican Republic | 10.95 | |

=== 200 metres ===
Heats – 2 July
Wind:
Heat 1: -0.6 m/s, Heat 2: 0.0 m/s, Heat 3: ? m/s

| Rank | Heat | Name | Nationality | Time | Notes |
|---|---|---|---|---|---|
| 1 | 2 | Leandro Peñalver | Cuba | 20.64 | Q |
| 2 | 3 | Sergio Querol | Cuba | 20.82 | Q |
| 3 | 3 | Michael Paul | Trinidad and Tobago | 21.08 | Q |
| 4 | 1 | Leroy Reid | Jamaica | 21.11 | Q |
| 4 | 3 | Juan Núñez | Dominican Republic | 21.11 | Q |
| 6 | 3 | Edgardo Guilbe | Puerto Rico | 21.23 | Q |
| 7 | 3 | Jimmy Flemming | United States Virgin Islands | 21.24 | q |
| 8 | 2 | Ali St. Louis | Trinidad and Tobago | 21.48 | Q |
| 9 | 2 | Fernando Ramsey | Panama | 21.60 | Q |
| 10 | 1 | Greg Barnes | United States Virgin Islands | 21.61 | Q |
| 11 | 1 | Julien Thode | Netherlands Antilles | 21.73 | Q |
| 12 | 1 | Fernando Reynoso | Dominican Republic | 21.78 | Q |
| 13 | 1 | Fabian Whymns | Bahamas | 21.83 | q |
| 14 | 1 | David Carter | Barbados | 21.86 | q |
| 15 | 2 | Jesús Cabrera | Puerto Rico | 21.92 | Q |
| 16 | 3 | Humberto Newball | Nicaragua | 22.12 | q |
| 17 | 2 | Humphrey Zimmerman | Netherlands Antilles | 22.12 | |
| 18 | 1 | Gavin Henry | Guyana | 22.71 | |
| | 2 | Allan Ingraham | Bahamas | DNF | |
| | 2 | Dean Greenaway | British Virgin Islands | DNS | |

Semifinals – 2 July
Wind:
Heat 1: -0.1 m/s, Heat 2: +0.1 m/s

| Rank | Heat | Name | Nationality | Time | Notes |
|---|---|---|---|---|---|
| 1 | 1 | Leandro Peñalver | Cuba | 20.53 | Q |
| 2 | 1 | Leroy Reid | Jamaica | 20.64 | Q |
| 3 | 2 | Sergio Querol | Cuba | 20.80 | Q |
| 4 | 1 | Juan Núñez | Dominican Republic | 20.89 | Q |
| 5 | 2 | Michael Paul | Trinidad and Tobago | 21.04 | Q |
| 6 | 1 | Greg Barnes | United States Virgin Islands | 21.17 | q |
| 7 | 1 | Ali St. Louis | Trinidad and Tobago | 21.23 | q |
| 8 | 1 | Fabian Whymns | Bahamas | 21.26 | |
| 8 | 2 | Jimmy Flemming | United States Virgin Islands | 21.26 | Q |
| 10 | 1 | Julien Thode | Netherlands Antilles | 21.39 | |
| 11 | 2 | Edgardo Guilbe | Puerto Rico | 21.42 | |
| 12 | 2 | Fernando Reynoso | Dominican Republic | 21.51 | |
| 13 | 2 | David Carter | Barbados | 21.56 | |
| 14 | 2 | Fernando Ramsey | Panama | 21.62 | |
| 15 | 1 | Jesús Cabrera | Puerto Rico | 21.83 | |
| 16 | 2 | Humberto Newball | Nicaragua | 22.27 | |

Final – 3 July
Wind: ? m/s

| Rank | Name | Nationality | Time | Notes |
|---|---|---|---|---|
| 1st place, gold medalist(s) | Leandro Peñalver | Cuba | 20.70 | |
| 2nd place, silver medalist(s) | Juan Núñez | Dominican Republic | 20.79 | |
| 3rd place, bronze medalist(s) | Leroy Reid | Jamaica | 20.90 | |
| 4 | Michael Paul | Trinidad and Tobago | 21.00 | |
| 5 | Sergio Querol | Cuba | 21.05 | |
| 6 | Jimmy Flemming | United States Virgin Islands | 21.41 | |
| 7 | Greg Barnes | United States Virgin Islands | 21.53 | |
| 8 | Ali St. Louis | Trinidad and Tobago | 21.78 | |

=== 400 metres ===
Heats – 1 July

| Rank | Heat | Name | Nationality | Time | Notes |
|---|---|---|---|---|---|
| 1 | 3 | Elvis Forde | Barbados | 46.68 | Q |
| 2 | 3 | Agustín Pavó | Cuba | 46.83 | Q |
| 3 | 2 | Ian Morris | Trinidad and Tobago | 46.85 | Q |
| 4 | 4 | David Peltier | Barbados | 47.22 | Q |
| 5 | 1 | Félix Stevens | Cuba | 47.23 | Q |
| 6 | 4 | Epifanio Rivera | Dominican Republic | 47.45 | Q |
| 7 | 4 | Jesús Malavé | Venezuela | 47.73 | Q |
| 8 | 1 | Allan Ingraham | Bahamas | 47.83 | Q |
| 9 | 2 | Héctor Daley | Panama | 47.98 | Q |
| 10 | 4 | Melvin Morales | Puerto Rico | 48.03 | q |
| 11 | 2 | Winthrop Graham | Jamaica | 48.05 | Q |
| 12 | 4 | George Bullard | Bahamas | 48.17 | q |
| 13 | 3 | Miggel Gabriel | Trinidad and Tobago | 48.39 | Q |
| 14 | 2 | Efrain Williams | Puerto Rico | 48.63 | q |
| 15 | 2 | Dean Greenaway | British Virgin Islands | 48.65 | q |
| 16 | 2 | Gavin Henry | Guyana | 48.68 | |
| 17 | 1 | Antonio Álvarez | Mexico | 48.94 | Q |
| 18 | 3 | Floyd Brown | United States Virgin Islands | 49.07 | |
| 19 | 1 | Cristobal Ovalle | Colombia | 49.32 | |
| 20 | 1 | Neville Hodge | United States Virgin Islands | 50.04 | |
| 21 | 2 | Lesley Valentyn | Suriname | 50.26 | |
| 22 | 1 | Sigfried Cruden | Suriname | 50.75 | |
| 23 | 3 | Mitchell Browne | Antigua and Barbuda | 50.78 | |
| | 3 | Luis Lague | Dominican Republic | DNF | |
| | 4 | Oral Selkridge | Antigua and Barbuda | DNS | |

Semifinals – 1 July

| Rank | Heat | Name | Nationality | Time | Notes |
|---|---|---|---|---|---|
| 1 | 1 | Ian Morris | Trinidad and Tobago | 45.31 | Q |
| 2 | 1 | Félix Stevens | Cuba | 45.45 | Q |
| 3 | 1 | Elvis Forde | Barbados | 45.69 | Q |
| 4 | 2 | Agustín Pavó | Cuba | 46.24 | Q |
| 5 | 1 | Jesús Malavé | Venezuela | 46.49 | q |
| 6 | 2 | Allan Ingraham | Bahamas | 46.81 | Q |
| 7 | 2 | Héctor Daley | Panama | 46.88 | Q |
| 8 | 2 | Epifanio Rivera | Dominican Republic | 47.19 | q |
| 9 | 2 | Miggel Gabriel | Trinidad and Tobago | 47.21 | |
| 10 | 1 | Winthrop Graham | Jamaica | 47.23 | |
| 11 | 2 | David Peltier | Barbados | 47.53 | |
| 12 | 1 | George Bullard | Bahamas | 47.79 | |
| 13 | 1 | Melvin Morales | Puerto Rico | 48.11 | |
| 14 | 2 | Antonio Álvarez | Mexico | 48.31 | |
| 15 | 1 | Dean Greenaway | British Virgin Islands | 48.58 | |
| 16 | 2 | Efrain Williams | Puerto Rico | 48.67 | |

Final – 2 July

| Rank | Name | Nationality | Time | Notes |
|---|---|---|---|---|
| 1st place, gold medalist(s) | Félix Stevens | Cuba | 44.98 | |
| 2nd place, silver medalist(s) | Ian Morris | Trinidad and Tobago | 45.02 | |
| 3rd place, bronze medalist(s) | Elvis Forde | Barbados | 45.65 | |
| 4 | Héctor Daley | Panama | 46.05 | |
| 5 | Agustín Pavó | Cuba | 46.33 | |
| 6 | Jesús Malavé | Venezuela | 46.70 | |
| 7 | Allan Ingraham | Bahamas | 47.53 | |
| 8 | Epifanio Rivera | Dominican Republic | 48.92 | |

=== 800 metres ===
Heats – 3 July

| Rank | Heat | Name | Nationality | Time | Notes |
|---|---|---|---|---|---|
| 1 | 1 | William Wuycke | Venezuela | 1:53.25 | Q |
| 2 | 1 | Carlyle Bernard | Trinidad and Tobago | 1:53.31 | Q |
| 3 | 1 | Félix Mesa | Cuba | 1:53.36 | Q |
| 4 | 1 | Reuben Bayley | Barbados | 1:53.42 | q |
| 5 | 1 | Miguel Rodríguez | Puerto Rico | 1:55.01 | q |
| 6 | 1 | Lesley Valentyn | Suriname | 1:55.73 | |
| 1 | 2 | Oslen Barr | Guyana | 1:53.69 | Q |
| 2 | 2 | Luis Karim Toledo | Mexico | 1:53.81 | Q |
| ? | 2 | Ángel Osoria | Cuba | ? | Q |
| 4 | 2 | Ezra Catwell | Barbados | 1:54.21 | |
| 5 | 2 | Abel Segura | Colombia | 1:54.23 | |
| | 2 | Francisco Manrique | Dominican Republic | DNF | |
| | 2 | Jesús Malavé | Venezuela | DNS | |
| | 2 | Jerry Molyneaux | British Virgin Islands | DNS | |

Final – 3 July

| Rank | Name | Nationality | Time | Notes |
|---|---|---|---|---|
| 1st place, gold medalist(s) | Oslen Barr | Guyana | 1:49.42 | |
| 2nd place, silver medalist(s) | William Wuycke | Venezuela | 1:49.45 | |
| 3rd place, bronze medalist(s) | Ángel Osoria | Cuba | 1:50.35 | |
| 4 | Francisco Meléndez | Puerto Rico | 1:50.36 | |
| 5 | Luis Karim Toledo | Mexico | 1:51.55 | |
| 6 | Carlyle Bernard | Trinidad and Tobago | 1:53.16 | |
| 7 | Reuben Bayley | Barbados | 1:53.52 | |
| 8 | Félix Mesa | Cuba | 1:54.57 | |

=== 1500 metres ===
Heats – 30 June

| Rank | Heat | Name | Nationality | Time | Notes |
|---|---|---|---|---|---|
| 1 | 1 | Félix Mesa | Cuba | 3:53.37 | Q |
| 2 | 1 | Germán Beltrán | Venezuela | 3:53.57 | Q |
| 3 | 1 | Abel Segura | Colombia | 3:54.04 | Q |
| 4 | 1 | Ruthsel Martina | Netherlands Antilles | 3:54.26 | Q |
| 5 | 2 | Jacinto Navarrete | Colombia | 3:54.36 | Q |
| 6 | 1 | Juan Luis Nemer | Mexico | 3:54.64 | Q |
| 7 | 2 | Roberto López | Mexico | 3:54.74 | Q |
| 8 | 1 | William Johnson | Bahamas | 3:54.85 | q |
| 9 | 2 | Pedro Guerra | Cuba | 3:55.78 | Q |
| 10 | 2 | Francisco Meléndez | Puerto Rico | 3:56.47 | Q |
| 11 | 2 | José López | Venezuela | 3:56.81 | Q |
| 12 | 2 | Radhamés Feliz | Dominican Republic | 3:57.26 | q |
| 13 | 1 | David Montañez | Puerto Rico | 3:57.87 | |
| 14 | 1 | Colin Toney | Guyana | 4:01.08 | |
| 15 | 2 | Tyrone Thibou | Antigua and Barbuda | 4:08.07 | |
| 16 | 1 | Byron Vargas | Honduras | 4:16.33 | |
| 17 | 2 | Pablo Paulino | Dominican Republic | 4:16.53 | |

Final – 2 July

| Rank | Name | Nationality | Time | Notes |
|---|---|---|---|---|
| 1st place, gold medalist(s) | Jacinto Navarrete | Colombia | 3:43.72 | |
| 2nd place, silver medalist(s) | Germán Beltrán | Venezuela | 3:43.99 | |
| 3rd place, bronze medalist(s) | Félix Mesa | Cuba | 3:45.50 | |
| 4 | Roberto López | Mexico | 3:47.40 | |
| 5 | Francisco Meléndez | Puerto Rico | 3:50.56 | |
| 6 | Abel Segura | Colombia | 3:51.49 | |
| 7 | Pedro Guerra | Cuba | 3:51.94 | |
| 8 | William Johnson | Bahamas | 3:53.90 | |
| 9 | Radhamés Feliz | Dominican Republic | 3:56.08 | |
| 10 | Ruthsel Martina | Netherlands Antilles | 3:59.40 | |
| 11 | Juan Luis Nemer | Mexico | 4:06.48 | |
| | José López | Venezuela | DNF | |

=== 5000 metres ===
1 July

| Rank | Name | Nationality | Time | Notes |
|---|---|---|---|---|
| 1st place, gold medalist(s) | Mauricio González | Mexico | 14:11.73 | |
| 2nd place, silver medalist(s) | Marcos Barreto | Mexico | 14:12.73 | |
| 3rd place, bronze medalist(s) | Juan Jesús Linares | Cuba | 14:13.76 | |
| 4 | Alberto Cuba | Cuba | 14:51.06 | |
| 5 | José Martínez | Venezuela | 14:57.15 | |
| 6 | Cristobal Lewis | Dominican Republic | 15:06.29 | |
| 7 | Ney Ortega | Dominican Republic | 15:57.49 | |
| 8 | Byron Vargas | Honduras | 16:00.81 | |
| 9 | Tyrone Thibou | Antigua and Barbuda | 16:13.32 | |
| | Phillip Walkine | Bahamas | DNF | |
| | Germán Beltrán | Venezuela | DNF | |
| | Eduardo Maldonado | Puerto Rico | DNS | |

=== 10,000 metres ===
29 June

| Rank | Name | Nationality | Time | Notes |
|---|---|---|---|---|
| 1st place, gold medalist(s) | Francisco Pacheco | Mexico | 29:39.56 | |
| 2nd place, silver medalist(s) | José Alcalá | Mexico | 30:05.35 | |
| 3rd place, bronze medalist(s) | Eduardo Maldonado | Puerto Rico | 30:29.39 | |
| 4 | Michael Feurtado | Jamaica | 30:38.04 | |
| 5 | Alberto Cuba | Cuba | 30:49.55 | |
| 6 | Andrés Chávez | Cuba | 31:12.47 | |
| 7 | Marlon Williams | United States Virgin Islands | 34:52.58 | |
| | Rafael Colmenares | Venezuela | DNF | |
| | José Gil | Dominican Republic | DNF | |

=== Marathon ===
4 July

| Rank | Name | Nationality | Time | Notes |
|---|---|---|---|---|
| 1st place, gold medalist(s) | Jesús Amariles | Colombia | 2:23:00 | |
| 2nd place, silver medalist(s) | Radamés González | Cuba | 2:25:54 | |
| 3rd place, bronze medalist(s) | Dieudonné Lamothe | Haiti | 2:32:11 | |
| 4 | Jorge Frias | Mexico | 2:32:44 | |
| 5 | Walter Gregoire | Haiti | 2:42:25 | |
| 6 | Juan Raudales | Honduras | 2:48:47 | |
| 7 | Francisco Pérez | Dominican Republic | 2:45:21 | |
| | Jorge González | Puerto Rico | DNF | |
| | Michael Feurtado | Jamaica | DNF | |
| | Juan Luis Nemer | Mexico | DNF | |
| | Pablo Arroyo | Dominican Republic | DNF | |
| | Luis López | Costa Rica | DNF | |

=== 110 metres hurdles ===
Heats – 2 July
Wind:
Heat 1: +0.4 m/s, Heat 2: ? m/s

| Rank | Heat | Name | Nationality | Time | Notes |
|---|---|---|---|---|---|
| 1 | 2 | Ángel Bueno | Cuba | 14.03 | Q |
| 2 | 1 | Juan Saborit | Cuba | 14.08 | Q |
| 3 | 2 | Modesto Castillo | Dominican Republic | 14.29 | Q |
| 4 | 1 | Ernesto Torres | Puerto Rico | 14.36 | Q |
| 5 | 1 | Rafael Paniagua | Dominican Republic | 14.58 | Q |
| 6 | 1 | Hugo Chamorro | Colombia | 14.71 | q |
| 7 | 2 | Reynaldo García | Puerto Rico | 14.75 | Q |
| 8 | 2 | Juan Phillips | Panama | 14.82 | q |
| 9 | 1 | Richard White | Barbados | 15.45 | |

Final – 2 July

Wind: +0.1 m/s

| Rank | Name | Nationality | Time | Notes |
|---|---|---|---|---|
| 1st place, gold medalist(s) | Ángel Bueno | Cuba | 13.86 | |
| 2nd place, silver medalist(s) | Juan Saborit | Cuba | 13.91 | |
| 3rd place, bronze medalist(s) | Ernesto Torres | Puerto Rico | 14.10 | |
| 4 | Modesto Castillo | Dominican Republic | 14.22 | |
| 5 | Rafael Paniagua | Dominican Republic | 14.34 | |
| 6 | Hugo Chamorro | Colombia | 14.58 | |
| 7 | Reynaldo García | Puerto Rico | 14.68 | |
| 8 | Juan Phillips | Panama | 14.90 | |

=== 400 metres hurdles ===
Heats – 29 June

| Rank | Heat | Name | Nationality | Time | Notes |
|---|---|---|---|---|---|
| 1 | 1 | Julio Prado | Cuba | 50.75 | Q |
| 2 | 2 | Winthrop Graham | Jamaica | 50.92 | Q |
| 3 | 1 | Jesús Aguilasocho | Mexico | 51.02 | Q |
| 4 | 2 | David Charlton | Bahamas | 51.07 | Q |
| 5 | 1 | Greg Rolle | Bahamas | 51.52 | Q |
| 6 | 2 | Francisco González | Colombia | 51.64 | Q |
| 7 | 2 | Francis Velasco | Cuba | 51.80 | q |
| 8 | 1 | César Espinosa | Dominican Republic | 51.85 | q |
| 9 | 2 | Domingo Cordero | Puerto Rico | 52.50 | |
| 10 | 1 | Wilfredo Ferrer | Venezuela | 52.94 | |
| 11 | 2 | Rafael Febles | Dominican Republic | 53.00 | |
| 12 | 1 | Juan Pagán | Puerto Rico | 53.02 | |
| 13 | 1 | Richard White | Barbados | 54.02 | |
| 14 | 1 | Leroy Lloyd | United States Virgin Islands | 58.02 | |
| | 2 | Oswaldo Zea | Venezuela | DNF | |

Final – 30 June

| Rank | Name | Nationality | Time | Notes |
|---|---|---|---|---|
| 1st place, gold medalist(s) | Winthrop Graham | Jamaica | 50.03 | GR |
| 2nd place, silver medalist(s) | David Charlton | Bahamas | 50.14 | |
| 3rd place, bronze medalist(s) | Jesús Aguilasocho | Mexico | 50.48 | |
| 4 | Francis Velasco | Cuba | 50.66 | |
| 5 | Julio Prado | Cuba | 50.88 | |
| 6 | Francisco González | Colombia | 51.81 | |
| 7 | Greg Rolle | Bahamas | 51.93 | |
| 8 | César Espinosa | Dominican Republic | 52.38 | |

=== 3000 metres steeplechase ===
4 July

| Rank | Name | Nationality | Time | Notes |
|---|---|---|---|---|
| 1st place, gold medalist(s) | Juan Ramón Conde | Cuba | 8:42.38 | GR |
| 2nd place, silver medalist(s) | Juan Jesús Linares | Cuba | 8:46.11 | |
| 3rd place, bronze medalist(s) | Rafael Colmenares | Venezuela | 8:52.83 | |
| 4 | Carmelo Ríos | Puerto Rico | 8:53.25 | |
| 5 | Alfredo Castro | Puerto Rico | 8:58.59 | |
| 6 | José Martínez | Venezuela | 8:59.17 | |
| 7 | Cristobal Lewis | Dominican Republic | 9:21.33 | |
| | Roberto López | Mexico | DNF | |
| | Juan Ramón Quezada | Dominican Republic | DNF | |

=== 4 × 100 metres relay ===
3 July

| Rank | Team | Name | Time | Notes |
|---|---|---|---|---|
| 1st place, gold medalist(s) | Cuba | Osvaldo Lara, Leandro Peñalver, Sergio Querol, Andrés Simón | 38.74 | GR |
| 2nd place, silver medalist(s) | Jamaica | Greg Meghoo, Andrew Smith, Ray Stewart, Leroy Reid | 38.96 | |
| 3rd place, bronze medalist(s) | Dominican Republic | José Méndez, Gerardo Suero, Fernando Reynoso, Juan Núñez | 39.56 | |
| 4 | Puerto Rico | Víctor Andino, Elmer Williams, Edgardo Guilbe, Luis Morales | 39.61 | |
| 5 | Trinidad and Tobago | Miggel Gabriel, Ian Morris, Micheael Paul, Ronnell Barclay | 40.38 | |
| 6 | United States Virgin Islands | Greg Barnes, Neville Hodge, Jimmy Flemming, Floyd Brown | 40.56 | |
| 7 | Bahamas | Fabian Whymns, Allan Ingraham, Lyndon Sands, Frank Rutherford | 40.64 | |
| 8 | Netherlands Antilles | Alvin Reiter, Francis Martien, Frensel Martiin, Humphrey Zimmerman | 42.58 | |

=== 4 × 400 metres relay ===
4 July

| Rank | Team | Name | Time | Notes |
|---|---|---|---|---|
| 1st place, gold medalist(s) | Cuba | Leandro Peñalver, Agustín Pavó, Jorge Valentín, Félix Stevens | 3:02.41 | GR |
| 2nd place, silver medalist(s) | Trinidad and Tobago | Ali St. Louis, Ian Morris, Michael Paul, Carlyle Bernard | 3:04.57 | |
| 3rd place, bronze medalist(s) | Barbados | Henrico Atkins, David Carter, Ezra Catwell, Elvis Forde | 3:06.88 | |
| 4 | Bahamas | George Bullard, Allan Ingraham, William Johnson, Greg Rolle | 3:09.74 | |
| 5 | Puerto Rico | Melvin Morales, Elmer Williams, Domingo Cordero, Miguel Rodríguez | 3:10.65 | |
| 6 | Dominican Republic | Epifanio Rivera, Anatalio Ramírez, César Espinosa, Rafael Mejía | 3:12.10 | |
| 7 | Mexico | Antonio Álvarez, Luis Karim Toledo, Jorge Burgos, Jesús Aguilasocho | 3:12.86 | |
| 8 | United States Virgin Islands | Floyd Brown, Kevin Clarke, Leroy Lloyd, Neville Hodge | 3:22.87 | |

=== 20 kilometres walk ===
1 July

| Rank | Name | Nationality | Time | Notes |
|---|---|---|---|---|
| 1st place, gold medalist(s) | Ernesto Canto | Mexico | 1:26:25 | GR |
| 2nd place, silver medalist(s) | Martín Bermúdez | Mexico | 1:27:23 | |
| 3rd place, bronze medalist(s) | Héctor Moreno | Colombia | 1:28:41 | |
| 4 | Víctor Alonso | Guatemala | 1:32:25 | |
| 5 | Carlos Ramones | Venezuela | 1:33:25 | |
| 6 | Santiago Fonseca | Honduras | 1:34:31 | |
| 7 | David Castro | Cuba | 1:35:08 | |
| 8 | Nelson Funes | Guatemala | 1:36:45 | |
| 9 | Jorge Velázquez | Cuba | 1:36:59 | |
| 10 | Santos Hernández | Puerto Rico | 1:38:31 | |
| 11 | Mario Rodríguez | Panama | 1:38:33 | |
| 12 | Ricardo Concepción | Panama | 1:40:57 | |

=== 50 kilometres walk ===
3 July

| Rank | Name | Nationality | Time | Notes |
|---|---|---|---|---|
| 1st place, gold medalist(s) | Martín Bermúdez | Mexico | 4:04:47 | GR |
| 2nd place, silver medalist(s) | Félix Gómez | Mexico | 4:07:20 | |
| 3rd place, bronze medalist(s) | Mauricio Cortés | Colombia | 4:26:27 | |
| 4 | Santiago Fonseca | Honduras | 4:37:07 | |
| 5 | José René Miranda | Puerto Rico | 4:44:44 | |
| 6 | Ricardo Concepción | Panama | 4:50:37 | |
| | Jorge Velázquez | Cuba | DNF | |
| | Nicolás Soto | Puerto Rico | DNF | |
| | Mario Rodríguez | Panama | DNF | |
| | Edel Oliva | Cuba | DNF | |
| | Porfirio Colón | Dominican Republic | DNS | |

=== High jump ===
29 June

| Rank | Name | Nationality | 1.95 | 2.00 | 2.05 | 2.08 | 2.11 | 2.14 | 2.16 | 2.18 | 2.20 | 2.22 | 2.28 | Result | Notes |
|---|---|---|---|---|---|---|---|---|---|---|---|---|---|---|---|
| 1st place, gold medalist(s) | Francisco Centelles | Cuba | – | – | – | – | xo | xxo | – | xxo | xxo | o | xxx | 2.22 | |
| 2nd place, silver medalist(s) | Bárbaro Díaz | Cuba | – | – | – | – | o | xo | xo | o | o | xxx | | 2.20 | |
| 2nd place, silver medalist(s) | Alfredo Mejía | Dominican Republic | – | – | o | – | o | xo | o | xo | o | xxx | | 2.20 | |
| 4 | Troy Kemp | Bahamas | – | – | o | xo | – | o | – | xxo | – | xx | | 2.18 | |
| 5 | Basil Greene | Bahamas | – | – | xxo | – | xxo | – | xxx | | | | | 2.11 | |
| 6 | Carlos Izquierdo | Colombia | o | o | o | xo | xxx | | | | | | | 2.08 | |
| 7 | Pablo Ávila | Dominican Republic | – | xo | xo | xxo | xxx | | | | | | | 2.08 | |

=== Pole vault ===
4 July

| Rank | Name | Nationality | 4.30 | 4.45 | 4.55 | 4.65 | 4.75 | 4.80 | 4.90 | 4.95 | 5.00 | 5.20 | 5.50 | Result | Notes |
|---|---|---|---|---|---|---|---|---|---|---|---|---|---|---|---|
| 1st place, gold medalist(s) | Rubén Camino | Cuba | – | – | – | – | – | – | – | – | o | o | xxx | 5.20 | GR |
| 2nd place, silver medalist(s) | José Echevarría | Cuba | – | – | – | – | o | – | xxo | – | xxo | xxx | | 5.00 | |
| 3rd place, bronze medalist(s) | Efram Meléndez | Puerto Rico | – | o | – | o | xo | – | o | xxx | | | | 4.90 | |
| 4 | Edgardo Rivera | Puerto Rico | – | – | – | – | – | xo | x– | xx | | | | 4.80 | |
| 5 | Brent Vanderpool | Bahamas | xo | – | xxx | | | | | | | | | 4.30 | |

=== Long jump ===
30 June

| Rank | Name | Nationality | #1 | #2 | #3 | #4 | #5 | #6 | Result | Notes |
|---|---|---|---|---|---|---|---|---|---|---|
| 1st place, gold medalist(s) | Jaime Jefferson | Cuba | 7.55 | 7.79 | 7.77 | 8.11 | 8.16 | 8.34 | 8.34 | GR |
| 2nd place, silver medalist(s) | Elmer Williams | Puerto Rico | 7.81 | 7.51 | 7.39 | x | x | 7.81 | 7.81 | |
| 3rd place, bronze medalist(s) | Ubaldo Duany | Cuba | 7.05 | x | x | 7.57 | x | x | 7.57 | |
| 4 | Lyndon Sands | Bahamas | x | x | 7.38 | x | x | x | 7.38 | |
| 5 | Ray Quiñones | Puerto Rico | x | x | 6.99 | x | 7.36 | 7.25 | 7.36 | |
| 6 | Daniel Núñez | Dominican Republic | x | x | 6.39 | x | 6.90 | 6.30 | 6.90 | |
| 7 | Francis Martien | Netherlands Antilles | 6.08 | 6.46 | x | 6.16 | x | 6.38 | 6.46 | |
| 8 | Andy St. Remy | United States Virgin Islands | 6.33 | x | x | x | 6.25 | x | 6.33 | |

=== Triple jump ===
4 July

| Rank | Name | Nationality | #1 | #2 | #3 | #4 | #5 | #6 | Result | Notes |
|---|---|---|---|---|---|---|---|---|---|---|
| 1st place, gold medalist(s) | Lázaro Betancourt | Cuba | 16.09 | 16.61 | 16.59 | x | 16.83 | 16.77 | 16.83 | GR |
| 2nd place, silver medalist(s) | Frank Rutherford | Bahamas | x | 15.48 | 16.67 | 16.24 | 16.12 | 16.42 | 16.67 | |
| 3rd place, bronze medalist(s) | Norbert Elliott | Bahamas | x | 14.97 | x | 16.23 | 16.40 | x | 16.40 | |
| 4 | Ernesto Torres | Puerto Rico | 15.60 | 15.76 | 16.01 | 15.96 | 16.28 | 16.38 | 16.38 | |
| 5 | Lázaro Balcindes | Cuba | 16.21 | 16.32 | x | x | 16.21 | 15.97 | 16.32 | |
| 6 | Carlos Wagner | Dominican Republic | 14.68 | 14.32 | 15.59 | 15.15 | 14.78 | – | 15.59 | |
| 7 | Edward Cruden | Suriname | x | 15.07 | 14.91 | x | x | 15.38 | 15.38 | |
| 8 | Edgard Blanco | Puerto Rico | 14.78 | x | x | 14.96 | 15.04 | 15.05 | 15.05 | |

=== Shot put ===
1 July

| Rank | Name | Nationality | #1 | #2 | #3 | #4 | #5 | #6 | Result | Notes |
|---|---|---|---|---|---|---|---|---|---|---|
| 1st place, gold medalist(s) | Paul Ruiz | Cuba | 18.76 | 19.01 | x | x | x | x | 19.01 | GR |
| 2nd place, silver medalist(s) | Marciso Boué | Cuba | 18.59 | x | 18.13 | 17.66 | 17.50 | 18.41 | 18.59 | |
| 3rd place, bronze medalist(s) | Hubert Maingot | Trinidad and Tobago | 16.42 | 16.66 | x | 16.24 | 16.54 | 16.99 | 16.99 | |
| 4 | Samuel Crespo | Puerto Rico | 15.81 | 16.55 | x | x | x | 16.37 | 16.55 | |
| 5 | James Dedier | Trinidad and Tobago | 15.37 | 15.17 | 16.15 | 15.90 | x | 16.47 | 16.47 | |
| 6 | Juan Cruz | Dominican Republic | x | 16.00 | x | 16.13 | 16.30 | x | 16.30 | |
| 7 | Wilfredo Jaimes | Venezuela | 15.64 | 15.61 | 15.33 | x | 15.48 | 15.22 | 15.64 | |
| 8 | Delfin Crespo | Puerto Rico | 14.70 | 14.80 | x | 15.20 | 14.36 | 14.96 | 15.20 | |
| 9 | Tyrone Minguel | Netherlands Antilles | 11.83 | 11.86 | 11.82 | | | | 11.86 | |

=== Discus throw ===
29 June

| Rank | Name | Nationality | #1 | #2 | #3 | #4 | #5 | #6 | Result | Notes |
|---|---|---|---|---|---|---|---|---|---|---|
| 1st place, gold medalist(s) | Luis Delís | Cuba | 60.74 | 60.20 | 61.34 | 61.00 | 60.56 | 63.16 | 63.16 | |
| 2nd place, silver medalist(s) | Juan Martínez | Cuba | 58.60 | 61.80 | 62.30 | 61.16 | x | 60.24 | 62.30 | |
| 3rd place, bronze medalist(s) | Brad Cooper | Bahamas | x | 60.84 | x | 60.30 | 55.60 | 61.40 | 61.40 | |
| 4 | James Dedier | Trinidad and Tobago | x | 46.92 | 50.90 | 53.04 | 51.32 | x | 53.04 | |
| 5 | Eulogio Cruz | Dominican Republic | 47.02 | 49.48 | 47.02 | 47.26 | 48.66 | 49.78 | 49.78 | |
| 6 | Félix Cordero | Dominican Republic | 47.20 | x | 45.64 | 46.90 | 48.10 | 48.56 | 48.56 | |
| 7 | Delfin Crespo | Puerto Rico | 46.05 | x | x | 45.92 | 45.90 | 42.38 | 46.05 | |
| 8 | Samuel Crespo | Puerto Rico | x | x | 42.78 | x | x | x | 42.78 | |
| 9 | Tyrone Minguel | Netherlands Antilles | 40.54 | x | 35.62 | | | | 40.54 | |
| 10 | Hugo Downes | Barbados | 36.40 | 37.78 | x | | | | 37.78 | |

=== Hammer throw ===
2 July

| Rank | Name | Nationality | #1 | #2 | #3 | #4 | #5 | #6 | Result | Notes |
|---|---|---|---|---|---|---|---|---|---|---|
| 1st place, gold medalist(s) | Vicente Sánchez | Cuba | 64.68 | x | 65.62 | 64.00 | 66.52 | 63.16 | 68.04 | |
| 2nd place, silver medalist(s) | Eladio Hernández | Cuba | x | x | x | 59.12 | 64.08 | x | 64.08 | |
| 3rd place, bronze medalist(s) | David Castrillón | Colombia | 60.14 | 62.98 | 63.68 | x | x | 60.84 | 63.68 | |
| 4 | Andrés Polemir | Dominican Republic | x | 60.58 | x | x | x | 59.06 | 60.58 | |
| 5 | Guillermo Guzmán | Mexico | 55.44 | 59.60 | x | 57.90 | x | 59.06 | 59.60 | |
| 6 | Fernando Chapman | Dominican Republic | 57.20 | x | 58.40 | 56.54 | x | 59.02 | 59.02 | |
| 7 | Edmundo Castillo | Venezuela | 53.98 | 55.06 | 54.94 | 53.26 | 56.68 | 56.46 | 56.68 | |
| 8 | Luis Martínez | Puerto Rico | 52.04 | x | 52.10 | 51.68 | 49.64 | x | 52.10 | |

=== Javelin throw ===
4 July

| Rank | Name | Nationality | #1 | #2 | #3 | #4 | #5 | #6 | Result | Notes |
|---|---|---|---|---|---|---|---|---|---|---|
| 1st place, gold medalist(s) | Ramón González | Cuba | 74.70 | 76.96 | 72.96 | 77.32 | 72.94 | 73.70 | 77.32 | GR |
| 2nd place, silver medalist(s) | Juan de la Garza | Mexico | 71.30 | 72.24 | 74.28 | 70.44 | x | 70.52 | 74.28 | |
| 3rd place, bronze medalist(s) | Máximo Driggs | Cuba | 72.14 | 68.92 | 74.06 | 72.26 | x | 69.30 | 74.06 | |
| 4 | José Gómez | Dominican Republic | 67.64 | 68.26 | 65.10 | 68.26 | 64.86 | x | 68.26 | |
| 5 | Amado Morales | Puerto Rico | 65.56 | 66.76 | 65.56 | 64.96 | 67.00 | 62.88 | 67.00 | |
| 6 | Hugo Downes | Barbados | 56.72 | 55.94 | 59.48 | 59.26 | 58.02 | 52.08 | 59.48 | |
| 7 | Jesús Bautista | Dominican Republic | 57.86 | 53.44 | 57.34 | 56.78 | 57.52 | 56.92 | 57.86 | |
| 8 | Patrick Bailey | Bahamas | 54.56 | 54.86 | 51.60 | 56.18 | 57.32 | 57.84 | 57.84 | |

=== Decathlon ===
2–3 July

The highest mark recorded in each event is highlighted in yellow

| Rank | Athlete | Nationality | 100m | LJ | SP | HJ | 400m | 110m H | DT | PV | JT | 1500m | Points | Notes |
|---|---|---|---|---|---|---|---|---|---|---|---|---|---|---|
| 1st place, gold medalist(s) | Ernesto Betancourt | Cuba | 11.27 | 6.67 | 15.57 | 1.95 | 50.28 | 15.86 | 41.96 | 4.04 | 57.98 | 4:49.25 | 7333 | |
| 2nd place, silver medalist(s) | Jorge Caraballo | Cuba | 11.52 | 6.40 | 14.33 | 1.83 | 51.12 | 15.88 | 41.92 | 4.44 | 59.96 | 4:59.95 | 7079 | |
| 3rd place, bronze medalist(s) | Ron McPhee | Bahamas | 10.95 | 6.79 | 12.85 | 1.86 | 49.55 | 15.79 | 34.32 | 3.64 | 55.82 | 5:17.27 | 6773 | |
| 4 | Ray Quiñones | Puerto Rico | 11.19 | 7.42 | 11.69 | 1.83 | 50.71 | 15.61 | 33.32 | 3.34 | 54.10 | 5:01.19 | 6719 | |
| | Sidney Cartwright | Bahamas | 11.54 | 6.27 | 13.00 | 1.83 | DNF | 15.77 | NM | DNS | – | – | DNF | |
| | Paul Hewlett | British Virgin Islands | 11.35 | 6.06 | ? | – | – | – | – | – | – | – | DNF | |
| | Rafael Paniagua | Dominican Republic | 11.63 | ? | – | – | – | – | – | – | – | – | DNF | |
| | Liston Bochette | Puerto Rico | 12.13 | ? | – | – | – | – | – | – | – | – | DNF | |

== Women's results ==
=== 100 metres ===
Heats – 29 June
Wind:
Heat 1: -0.1 m/s, Heat 2: +0.5 m/s

| Rank | Heat | Name | Nationality | Time | Notes |
|---|---|---|---|---|---|
| 1 | 1 | Camille Coates | Jamaica | 11.52 | Q |
| 1 | 2 | Pauline Davis | Bahamas | 11.52 | Q |
| 3 | 2 | Amparo Caicedo | Colombia | 11.55 | Q |
| 4 | 2 | Sandra Dennis | Jamaica | 11.58 | Q |
| 5 | 1 | Susana Armenteros | Cuba | 11.75 | Q |
| 6 | 1 | Deborah Greene | Bahamas | 11.76 | Q |
| 7 | 2 | Luisa Ferrer | Cuba | 11.87 | q |
| 8 | 1 | Jenny Fuentes | Puerto Rico | 11.93 | q |
| 9 | 1 | Alejandra Flores | Mexico | 12.01 | |
| 10 | 1 | Buenaventura Santana | Dominican Republic | 12.02 | |
| 11 | 2 | Marta Moreno | Puerto Rico | 12.08 | |
| 12 | 2 | Mayra Rosado | Dominican Republic | 12.18 | |
| 13 | 2 | Soraima Martha | Netherlands Antilles | 12.59 | |
| 14 | 1 | Ruth Morris | United States Virgin Islands | 12.74 | |

Final – 30 June

Wind: -1.0 m/s

| Rank | Name | Nationality | Time | Notes |
|---|---|---|---|---|
| 1st place, gold medalist(s) | Pauline Davis | Bahamas | 11.51 | |
| 2nd place, silver medalist(s) | Camille Coates | Jamaica | 11.69 | |
| 3rd place, bronze medalist(s) | Amparo Caicedo | Colombia | 11.85 | |
| 4 | Luisa Ferrer | Cuba | 11.94 | |
| 5 | Susana Armenteros | Cuba | 12.03 | |
| 6 | Sandra Dennis | Jamaica | 12.06 | |
| 7 | Deborah Greene | Bahamas | 12.09 | |
| 8 | Jenny Fuentes | Puerto Rico | 12.15 | |

=== 200 metres ===
Heats – 2 July
Wind:
Heat 1: ? m/s, Heat 2: ? m/s

| Rank | Heat | Name | Nationality | Time | Notes |
|---|---|---|---|---|---|
| 1 | 1 | Pauline Davis | Bahamas | 23.30 | Q |
| 2 | 2 | Deborah Greene | Bahamas | 23.61 | Q |
| 3 | 2 | Camille Coates | Jamaica | 23.75 | Q |
| 4 | 1 | Amparo Caicedo | Colombia | 23.94 | Q |
| 5 | 2 | Ester Petitón | Cuba | 23.95 | Q |
| 6 | 1 | Luisa Ferrer | Cuba | 24.36 | Q |
| 7 | 1 | María Báez | Dominican Republic | 24.43 | q |
| 8 | 2 | Celia Vargas | Dominican Republic | 24.83 | q |
| 9 | 2 | Soraima Martha | Netherlands Antilles | 25.51 | |
| 10 | 1 | Ruth Morris | United States Virgin Islands | 26.04 | |
| 11 | 2 | Carla Valmont | United States Virgin Islands | 27.82 | |

Final – 3 July

Wind: +0.4 m/s

| Rank | Name | Nationality | Time | Notes |
|---|---|---|---|---|
| 1st place, gold medalist(s) | Pauline Davis | Bahamas | 23.06 | |
| 2nd place, silver medalist(s) | Camille Coates | Jamaica | 23.44 | |
| 3rd place, bronze medalist(s) | Amparo Caicedo | Colombia | 23.52 | |
| 4 | Deborah Greene | Bahamas | 23.54 | |
| 5 | Luisa Ferrer | Cuba | 23.86 | |
| 6 | Ester Petitón | Cuba | 23.93 | |
| 7 | María Báez | Dominican Republic | 24.45 | |
| 8 | Celia Vargas | Dominican Republic | 24.82 | |

=== 400 metres ===
Heats – 1 July

| Rank | Heat | Name | Nationality | Time | Notes |
|---|---|---|---|---|---|
| 1 | 1 | Ana Fidelia Quirot | Cuba | 52.67 | Q |
| 2 | 2 | Ilrey Oliver | Jamaica | 53.64 | Q |
| 3 | 2 | Norfalia Carabalí | Colombia | 53.88 | Q |
| 4 | 1 | Cathy Rattray | Jamaica | 53.89 | Q |
| 5 | 2 | Luisa Peña | Cuba | 56.47 | Q |
| 6 | 1 | Guadalupe García | Mexico | 56.79 | Q |
| 7 | 1 | Virginia Cruz | Dominican Republic | 57.81 | q |
| 8 | 2 | Ana Peña | Dominican Republic | 58.32 | q |
| 9 | 2 | Ruth Morris | United States Virgin Islands | 58.73 | |
| 10 | 1 | Veona McFarrene | United States Virgin Islands | 1:02.34 | |

Final – 2 July

| Rank | Name | Nationality | Time | Notes |
|---|---|---|---|---|
| 1st place, gold medalist(s) | Ana Fidelia Quirot | Cuba | 51.01 | |
| 2nd place, silver medalist(s) | Norfalia Carabalí | Colombia | 52.46 | |
| 3rd place, bronze medalist(s) | Cathy Rattray | Jamaica | 52.67 | |
| 4 | Ilrey Oliver | Jamaica | 53.12 | |
| 5 | Luisa Peña | Cuba | 56.09 | |
| 6 | Virginia Cruz | Dominican Republic | 57.50 | |
| 7 | Ana Peña | Dominican Republic | 1:01.46 | |
| | Guadalupe García | Mexico | DNF | |

=== 800 metres ===
Heats – 3 July

| Rank | Heat | Name | Nationality | Time | Notes |
|---|---|---|---|---|---|
| 1 | 1 | Angelita Lind | Puerto Rico | 2:11.93 | Q |
| 2 | 1 | Cathy Rattray | Jamaica | 2:14.86 | Q |
| 3 | 1 | Ana Fidelia Quirot | Cuba | 2:17.61 | Q |
| 4 | 1 | Leticia Gracia | Mexico | 2:17.76 | q |
| 5 | 1 | Maribel Silvestre | Dominican Republic | 2:18.29 | q |
| 6 | 2 | Imelda González | Mexico | 2:26.99 | Q |
| 7 | 2 | Nery McKeen | Cuba | 2:27.01 | Q |
| 8 | 2 | Norfalia Carabalí | Colombia | 2:27.02 | Q |
| 9 | 2 | María Acevedo | Dominican Republic | 2:27.10 | |
| | 2 | Cristina Girón | Guatemala | DNS | |

Final – 3 July

| Rank | Name | Nationality | Time | Notes |
|---|---|---|---|---|
| 1st place, gold medalist(s) | Ana Fidelia Quirot | Cuba | 1:59.00 | GR |
| 2nd place, silver medalist(s) | Angelita Lind | Puerto Rico | 2:02.12 | |
| 3rd place, bronze medalist(s) | Imelda González | Mexico | 2:02.26 | |
| 4 | Cathy Rattray | Jamaica | 2:03.96 | |
| 5 | Nery McKeen | Cuba | 2:04.66 | |
| 6 | Norfalia Carabalí | Colombia | 2:09.23 | |
| 7 | Leticia Gracia | Mexico | 2:10.93 | |
| 8 | Maribel Silvestre | Dominican Republic | 2:19.28 | |

=== 1500 metres ===
| Rank | Name | Nationality | Time | Notes |
|---|---|---|---|---|
| 1st place, gold medalist(s) | Angelita Lind | Puerto Rico | 4:18.67 | |
| 2nd place, silver medalist(s) | Imelda González | Mexico | 4:19.58 | |
| 3rd place, bronze medalist(s) | Nery McKeen | Cuba | 4:23.34 | |
| 6 | Edna Gascot | Puerto Rico | 4:34.05 | |

=== 3000 metres ===
| Rank | Name | Nationality | Time | Notes |
|---|---|---|---|---|
| 1st place, gold medalist(s) | Fabiola Rueda | Colombia | 9:30.25 | GR |
| 2nd place, silver medalist(s) | Sergia Martínez | Cuba | 9:36.84 | |
| 3rd place, bronze medalist(s) | Santa Velázquez | Mexico | 9:42.36 | |
| 6 | Janice Carlo | Puerto Rico | 10:17.52 | |

=== 10,000 metres ===
| Rank | Name | Nationality | Time | Notes |
|---|---|---|---|---|
| 1st place, gold medalist(s) | Genoveva Domínguez | Mexico | 36:24.39 | GR |
| 2nd place, silver medalist(s) | Maricela Hurtado | Mexico | 36:29.12 | |
| 3rd place, bronze medalist(s) | Maribel Durruty | Cuba | 38:20.27 | |
| | Janice Carlo | Puerto Rico | DNF | |

=== Marathon ===
2 July

| Rank | Name | Nationality | Time | Notes |
|---|---|---|---|---|
| 1st place, gold medalist(s) | Naidi Nazario | Puerto Rico | 2:55:44 | GR |
| 2nd place, silver medalist(s) | Maribel Durruty | Cuba | 3:08:57 | |
| 3rd place, bronze medalist(s) | Aida Torres | Puerto Rico | 3:10:19 | |
| 4 | Alma López | Mexico | 3:25:40 | |
| 5 | Deysi Pérez | Cuba | 3:26:01 | |
| 6 | Clara Medina | Dominican Republic | 3:38:16 | |
| 7 | Elsa Mendoza | Guatemala | 3:38:45 | |

=== 100 metres hurdles ===
1 July
Wind: -0.1 m/s

| Rank | Name | Nationality | Time | Notes |
|---|---|---|---|---|
| 1st place, gold medalist(s) | Odalys Adams | Cuba | 13.50 | |
| 2nd place, silver medalist(s) | Grisel Machado | Cuba | 13.56 | |
| 3rd place, bronze medalist(s) | Sandra Taváres | Mexico | 13.86 | |
| 4 | Shonel Ferguson | Bahamas | 13.91 | |
| 5 | Flora Hyacinth | United States Virgin Islands | 14.15 | |
| 6 | Marisela Peralta | Dominican Republic | 14.49 | |
| 7 | Carmel Major | Bahamas | 15.75 | |
| | Leyda Castro | Dominican Republic | DNF | |

=== 400 metres hurdles ===
Heats – 29 June

| Rank | Heat | Name | Nationality | Time | Notes |
|---|---|---|---|---|---|
| 1 | 1 | Tania Fernández | Cuba | 57.87 | Q, GR |
| 2 | 1 | Flora Hyacinth | United States Virgin Islands | 58.24 | Q |
| 3 | 2 | Odalys Hernández | Cuba | 59.56 | Q |
| 4 | 1 | Leticia Gracia | Mexico | 1:00.49 | Q |
| 5 | 2 | Carmel Major | Bahamas | 1:01.09 | Q |
| 6 | 2 | Alma Vázquez | Mexico | 1:01.36 | Q |
| 7 | 2 | Glennis Reynoso | Dominican Republic | 1:01.62 | q |
| 8 | 1 | Roxanne Oliver | Puerto Rico | 1:03.33 | q |
| 9 | 1 | Dilcia Díaz | Dominican Republic | 1:05.32 | |
| | 2 | Mercedes Ríos | Puerto Rico | DNF | |

Final – 30 June

| Rank | Name | Nationality | Time | Notes |
|---|---|---|---|---|
| 1st place, gold medalist(s) | Flora Hyacinth | United States Virgin Islands | 57.55 | GR |
| 2nd place, silver medalist(s) | Tania Fernández | Cuba | 57.60 | |
| 3rd place, bronze medalist(s) | Alma Vázquez | Mexico | 59.05 | |
| 4 | Odalys Hernández | Cuba | 59.98 | |
| 5 | Carmel Major | Bahamas | 1:00.61 | |
| 6 | Leticia Gracia | Mexico | 1:00.94 | |
| 7 | Glennis Reynoso | Dominican Republic | 1:04.72 | |
| | Roxanne Oliver | Puerto Rico | DNF | |

=== 4 × 100 metres relay ===
3 July

| Rank | Team | Name | Time | Notes |
|---|---|---|---|---|
| 1st place, gold medalist(s) | Cuba | Idania Pino, Luisa Ferrer, Susana Armenteros, María Zamora | 44.55 | |
| 2nd place, silver medalist(s) | Bahamas | Carmel Major, Pauline Davis, Deborah Greene, Shonel Ferguson | 45.49 | |
| 3rd place, bronze medalist(s) | Mexico | Guadalupe García, Alma Vázquez, Alejandra Flores, Sandra Taváres | 45.58 | |
| 4 | Dominican Republic | Felicia Candelario, María Báez, Belkis Almanzar, Buenaventura Santana | 45.81 | |
| 5 | Puerto Rico | Mercedes Ríos, Marta Moreno, Virgen Fontánez, Jenny Fuentes | 45.96 | |
| 6 | United States Virgin Islands | Ruth Morris, Carla Valmont, Cislyn Blake, Flora Hyacinth | 49.33 | |

=== 4 × 400 metres relay ===
4 July

| Rank | Team | Name | Time | Notes |
|---|---|---|---|---|
| 1st place, gold medalist(s) | Cuba | Ester Petitón, Odalys Hernández, Nery McKeen, Ana Fidelia Quirot | 3:33.60 | |
| 2nd place, silver medalist(s) | Puerto Rico | Virgen Fontánez, Roxanne Oliver, Mercedes Ríos, Angelita Lind | 3:41.32 | |
| 3rd place, bronze medalist(s) | Dominican Republic | María Acevedo, Ana Peña, Virginia Cruz, Glennis Reynoso | 3:47.84 | |
| 4 | Mexico | Guadalupe García, Leticia Gracia, Alma Vázquez, Imelda González | 3:52.98 | |
| | United States Virgin Islands | | DNS | |

=== 10,000 metres walk ===
| Rank | Name | Nationality | Time | Notes |
|---|---|---|---|---|
| 1st place, gold medalist(s) | María Colín | Mexico | 50:43.62 | GR |
| 2nd place, silver medalist(s) | Graciela Mendoza | Mexico | 51:56.62 | |
| 3rd place, bronze medalist(s) | Margarita Morales | Cuba | 55:00.93 | |

=== High jump ===
| Rank | Name | Nationality | Result | Notes |
|---|---|---|---|---|
| 1st place, gold medalist(s) | Silvia Costa | Cuba | 1.96 | GR |
| 2nd place, silver medalist(s) | Cristina Fink | Mexico | 1.81 | |
| 3rd place, bronze medalist(s) | Laura Agront | Puerto Rico | 1.79 | |

=== Long jump ===
29 June

| Rank | Name | Nationality | #1 | #2 | #3 | #4 | #5 | #6 | Result | Notes |
|---|---|---|---|---|---|---|---|---|---|---|
| 1st place, gold medalist(s) | Eloína Echevarría | Cuba | 6.20 | 6.42 | 6.43 | 6.49 | 6.42 | 6.61 | 6.61 | GR |
| 2nd place, silver medalist(s) | Shonel Ferguson | Bahamas | 6.19 | 6.21 | 6.43 | x | 6.34 | 6.08 | 6.43 | |
| 3rd place, bronze medalist(s) | Flora Hyacinth | United States Virgin Islands | 5.72 | 6.11 | x | 6.11 | 6.36 | 6.03 | 6.36 | |
| 4 | Euphemia Huggins | Trinidad and Tobago | 6.32 | x | x | 6.01 | x | x | 6.32 | |
| 5 | Cynthia Henry | Jamaica | 5.88 | x | 6.01 | x | 6.13 | 6.27 | 6.27 | |
| 6 | Jacinta Bartholomew | Grenada | 6.02 | x | 5.80 | 5.76 | x | 6.15 | 6.15 | |
| 7 | Caridad Balcindes | Cuba | 5.69 | 5.61 | 5.97 | 5.83 | 5.78 | 6.00 | 6.00 | |
| 8 | Wilmarie Ramos | Puerto Rico | 5.44 | 5.34 | 5.50 | 5.37 | x | 5.43 | 5.50 | |
| 9 | Jenny Fuentes | Puerto Rico | 5.47 | x | 5.06 | | | | 5.47 | |

=== Shot put ===
29 June

| Rank | Name | Nationality | #1 | #2 | #3 | #4 | #5 | #6 | Result | Notes |
|---|---|---|---|---|---|---|---|---|---|---|
| 1st place, gold medalist(s) | Marcelina Rodríguez | Cuba | 17.22 | 17.11 | x | x | x | x | 17.22 | |
| 2nd place, silver medalist(s) | Rosa Fernández | Cuba | 16.72 | 17.17 | 17.17 | x | x | 16.67 | 17.17 | |
| 3rd place, bronze medalist(s) | María Isabel Urrutia | Colombia | 12.24 | 13.73 | 13.03 | x | 14.48 | 13.88 | 14.48 | |
| 4 | Helen Weidum | Suriname | 13.42 | 13.48 | 13.18 | 13.88 | 13.18 | x | 13.88 | |
| 5 | Belkis Green | Dominican Republic | 12.36 | 12.24 | 12.15 | 12.61 | 12.71 | 12.20 | 12.71 | |
| 6 | Vicenta Cocco | Dominican Republic | x | 11.53 | x | 12.24 | 11.57 | 11.38 | 12.24 | |
| 7 | Edna Pérez | Puerto Rico | 12.18 | x | 10.95 | x | 11.59 | 12.18 | 12.18 | |
| | Patricia Comandari | El Salvador | | | | | | | DNS | |

=== Discus throw ===
4 July

| Rank | Name | Nationality | #1 | #2 | #3 | #4 | #5 | #6 | Result | Notes |
|---|---|---|---|---|---|---|---|---|---|---|
| 1st place, gold medalist(s) | Hilda Ramos | Cuba | 61.36 | 63.44 | 61.58 | 59.02 | x | 60.42 | 63.44 | |
| 2nd place, silver medalist(s) | Maritza Martén | Cuba | 61.04 | x | 62.76 | 60.92 | 63.24 | x | 63.24 | |
| 3rd place, bronze medalist(s) | María Isabel Urrutia | Colombia | x | 47.56 | 47.22 | 50.68 | 47.18 | x | 50.68 | |
| 4 | Jenny Quintero | Venezuela | x | 40.98 | 43.08 | 40.06 | 43.50 | 45.96 | 45.96 | |
| 5 | Juana Mejía | Dominican Republic | 36.86 | 44.16 | x | x | 40.92 | 38.16 | 44.16 | |
| 6 | Sherry Howell | Netherlands Antilles | 37.28 | 36.98 | 39.18 | x | 39.14 | 35.66 | 39.18 | |
| 7 | Patricia Comandari | El Salvador | 38.44 | x | x | x | 33.68 | 38.16 | 38.44 | |
| 8 | Helen Weidum | Suriname | x | x | 31.32 | x | 31.58 | x | 31.58 | |

=== Javelin throw ===
30 June

| Rank | Name | Nationality | #1 | #2 | #3 | #4 | #5 | #6 | Result | Notes |
|---|---|---|---|---|---|---|---|---|---|---|
| 1st place, gold medalist(s) | María Caridad Colón | Cuba | 60.16 | 62.54 | 63.46 | 67.00 | 63.30 | 63.46 | 67.00 | GR |
| 2nd place, silver medalist(s) | Ivonne Leal | Cuba | x | x | 52.16 | x | 53.76 | 56.56 | 56.56 | |
| 3rd place, bronze medalist(s) | María González | Puerto Rico | 44.58 | 49.10 | x | x | 50.64 | 54.38 | 54.38 | |
| 4 | Marieta Riera | Venezuela | x | 50.20 | 52.30 | x | 53.86 | 51.56 | 53.86 | |
| 5 | Juana King | Dominican Republic | x | x | 48.82 | x | 46.40 | 51.88 | 51.88 | |
| 6 | Laverne Eve | Bahamas | x | 41.48 | 41.84 | x | x | 47.34 | 47.34 | |
| 7 | Ana María Valle | Nicaragua | 44.28 | 45.18 | x | x | 45.66 | 42.84 | 42.84 | |
| 8 | Daisy Ocasio | Puerto Rico | x | 41.12 | 41.12 | x | x | x | 41.12 | |

=== Heptathlon ===
30 June – 1 July

The highest mark recorded in each event is highlighted in yellow

| Rank | Name | Nationality | 100m H | HJ | SP | 200m | LJ | JT | 800m | Points | Notes |
|---|---|---|---|---|---|---|---|---|---|---|---|
| 1st place, gold medalist(s) | Caridad Balcindes | Cuba | 14.94 | 1.76 | 11.90 | 26.00 | 5.84 | 35.68 | 2:29.53 | 5313 | |
| 2nd place, silver medalist(s) | Leyda Castro | Dominican Republic | 14.75 | 1.55 | 10.58 | 24.94 | 5.87 | 40.62 | 2:27.21 | 5025 | |
| 3rd place, bronze medalist(s) | Irina Ambulo | Panama | 15.12 | 1.61 | 10.14 | 24.44 | 5.16 | 30.62 | 2:17.66 | 4997 | NR |
| 4 | Nadya Katich | Colombia | 15.10 | 1.67 | 11.40 | 25.62 | 4.92 | 34.02 | 2:27.23 | 4917 | |
| 5 | Emilia Lenk | Mexico | 15.67 | 1.58 | 11.26 | 25.52 | 5.45 | 33.20 | 2:36.02 | 4761 | |
| 6 | Sherry Howell | Netherlands Antilles | 15.96 | 1.61 | 11.88 | 25.83 | 4.93 | 36.68 | 2:34.79 | 4761 | |
| 7 | Daisy Ocasio | Puerto Rico | 15.70 | 1.49 | 11.70 | 27.49 | 4.81 | 39.46 | 2:20.82 | 4651 | |
| | Hildelisa Despaigne | Cuba | DNF | 1.67 | DNS | – | – | – | – | DNF | |
