= 1985 Central American and Caribbean Championships in Athletics =

- Dates: 25–27 July
- Host city: Nassau, Bahamas
- Venue: Thomas Robinson Stadium

The 1985 Central American and Caribbean Championships in Athletics were held at the Thomas Robinson Stadium in Nassau, Bahamas between 25 and 27 July.

== Medal summary ==
=== Men's events ===
Event	Gold		Silver		Bronze	
100 metres (wind: +1.1 m/s)	Andrés Simón; Cuba	10.22	Osvaldo Lara; Cuba	10.30	Fabian Whymns; Bahamas	10.41
200 metres	Leandro Peñalver; Cuba	20.56 CR	Félix Stevens; Cuba	20.70	David Smith; Jamaica	20.82
400 metres	Roberto Hernández; Cuba	45.34	Bert Cameron; Jamaica	45.44	Elvis Forde; Barbados	45.74
800 metres	Reuben Bayley; Barbados	1:48.93	Steve Burgess; Bermuda	1:49.48	Livingston Marshall; Bahamas	1:49.77
1500 metres	Rafael Martínez; Mexico	3:43.81	Francisco Pacheco; Mexico	3:44.75	Carlos Quiñones; Puerto Rico	3:45.60
5000 metres	Francisco Pacheco; Mexico	13:53.30 CR	Silvio Salazar; Colombia	13:54.00	Mauricio González; Mexico	14:11.50
10,000 metres	Jesús Herrera; Mexico	29:56.30	Martín Pitayo; Mexico	29:58.20	Silvio Salazar; Colombia	30:12.00
Marathon	Claudio Cabán; Puerto Rico	2:38:18	Anthony Williams; Bahamas	2:43:25		
110 metres hurdles (wind: +0.8 m/s)	Alejandro Casañas; Cuba	13.68	Juan Saborit; Cuba	13.83	Gary Bullard; Bahamas	14.74
400 metres hurdles	Jesús Aguilasocho; Mexico	49.81 CR	Greg Rolle; Bahamas	51.01	Wilfredo Santiago; Puerto Rico	51.30
3000 metres steeplechase	Juan Ramón Conde; Cuba	8:36.80 CR	Juan Jesús Linares; Cuba	8:39.20	Carmelo Ríos; Puerto Rico	8:40.90
4 × 100 metres relay	Cuba; Osvaldo Lara; Leandro Peñalver; Félix Stevens; Andrés Simón	39.17 CR	Bahamas; Ricardo Grey; Austin Albury; Fabian Whymns; Audrick Lightbourne	40.25	Puerto Rico; Luis Morales; Ray Quiñones; Elmer Williams; José Valdez	40.5
4 × 400 metres relay	Cuba; Félix Stevens; Julio Prado; Leandro Peñalver; Roberto Hernández	3:03.38 CR	Barbados; David Peltier; Richard Louis; David Carter; Elvis Forde	3:03.69	Mexico; Luis Karim Toledo; Antonio Álvarez; Jorge Burgos; Jesús Aguilasocho	3:07.50
20 km road walk	Ernesto Canto; Mexico	1:28:26	Biliulfo Andablo; Mexico	1:31:16	Héctor Moreno; Colombia	1:32:52
50 km road walk	Martín Bermúdez; Mexico	4:22:33	Pedro Aroche; Mexico	4:28:09	Edel Oliva; Cuba	4:40:37
High jump	Javier Sotomayor; Cuba	2.30 CR	Francisco Centelles; Cuba	2.30	Clarence Saunders; Bermuda	2.14
Pole vault	Rubén Camino; Cuba	5.20 =CR	Manuel Fuentes; Venezuela	4.70	Alberto Nieves; Puerto Rico	4.60
Long jump	Jaime Jefferson; Cuba	8.13 CR	Ubaldo Duany; Cuba	8.07	Elmer Williams; Puerto Rico	7.93w
Triple jump	Steve Hanna; Bahamas	17.07 CR	Lázaro Balcindes; Cuba	16.80	Ernesto Torres; Puerto Rico	16.46w
Shot put	Paul Ruiz; Cuba	18.98	Luis Delís; Cuba	18.52	James Dedier; Trinidad and Tobago	16.37
Discus throw	Luis Delís; Cuba	66.50 CR	Juan Martínez; Cuba	64.78	Bradley Cooper; Bahamas	60.10
Hammer throw	Alejandro Labardesque; Cuba	63.90	Francisco Soria; Cuba	60.68	David Castrillón; Colombia	59.42
Javelin throw	Reinaldo Patterson; Cuba	79.20	Ramón González; Cuba	76.88	Juan de la Garza; Mexico	74.90
Decathlon	Sidney Cartwright; Bahamas	7000	Brooke Onley; Bermuda	6908	Ron McPhee; Bahamas	6694

=== Women's events ===
Event	Gold		Silver		Bronze	
100 metres (wind: +1.3 m/s)	Merlene Ottey; Jamaica	11.18 CR	Grace Jackson; Jamaica	11.27	Pauline Davis; Bahamas	11.47
200 metres	Merlene Ottey; Jamaica	22.39 CR	Grace Jackson; Jamaica	22.64	Pauline Davis; Bahamas	23.37
400 metres	Ana Fidelia Quirot; Cuba	50.96 CR	Andrea Thomas; Jamaica	52.58	Jocelyn Joseph; Antigua and Barbuda	53.25
800 metres	Ana Fidelia Quirot; Cuba	2:03.60 CR	Nery McKeen; Cuba	2:04.10	Norfalia Carabalí; Colombia	2:05.40
1500 metres	Angelita Lind; Puerto Rico	4:23.35	Nery McKeen; Cuba	4:25.03	Alicia Diffourt; Cuba	4:25.84
3000 metres	Santa Velázquez; Mexico	9:35.10 CR	Adriana Frausto; Mexico	9:46.10	Sergia Martínez; Cuba	9:47.90
10,000 metres	Yolanda Veranes; Cuba	36:56.40 CR	Carmen Martínez; Puerto Rico	37:28.30	Ileana Arroyo; Puerto Rico	37:48.20
100 metres hurdles	Grisel Machado; Cuba	13.43w	Sandra Taváres; Mexico	13.78w	Odalys Hernández; Cuba	13.83w
400 metres hurdles	Belkis Chávez; Cuba	58.77	Odalys Hernández; Cuba	59.50	Carmel Major; Bahamas	59.90
4 × 100 metres relay	Bahamas; Carmel Major; Pauline Davis; Shonel Ferguson; Chandra Sturrup	45.71	Mexico; Alejandra Flores; Sandra Taváres; Giomar Fernández; Alma Vázquez	46.04	Puerto Rico; Virgen Fontanez; Mercedes Ríos; Marta Moreno; Jenny Fuentes	47.25
4 × 400 metres relay	Cuba; Belkis Chávez; Odalys Hernández; Nery McKeen; Ana Fidelia Quirot	3:34.47 CR	Mexico; Rocio Rohen; Alma Vázquez; Erendira Villagómez; Leticia García	3:40.75	Bahamas; Whelma Colebrooke; Carmel Major; Joanne Major; Chandra Sturrup	3:43.33
High jump	Silvia Costa; Cuba	1.88 CR	Cristina Fink; Mexico	1.81	Laura Agront; Puerto Rico	1.75
Long jump	Shonel Ferguson; Bahamas	6.47w	Eloína Echevarría; Cuba	6.41w	Victoria Despaigne; Cuba	5.97
Shot put	Marcelina Rodríguez; Cuba	17.16	Rosa Fernández; Cuba	16.76	Laverne Eve; Bahamas	14.54
Discus throw	Maritza Martén; Cuba	61.02	Hilda Ramos; Cuba	60.78	María Isabel Urrutia; Colombia	55.56
Javelin throw	Mayra Vila; Cuba	63.38 CR	María Caridad Colón; Cuba	62.78	Sonya Smith; Bermuda	49.44
Heptathlon	Victoria Despaigne; Cuba	5323	Nadia Katich; Colombia	5245	Leyda Castro; Dominican Republic	4884

== Medal table ==
* Host nation (Bahamas)

Rank	Nation	Gold	Silver	Bronze	Total
1	Cuba (CUB)	25	18	5	48
2	Mexico (MEX)	7	9	3	19
3	Bahamas (BAH)*	4	3	10	17
4	Jamaica (JAM)	2	4	1	7
5	Puerto Rico (PUR)	2	1	10	13
6	Barbados (BAR)	1	1	1	3
7	Colombia (COL)	0	2	5	7
8	Bermuda (BER)	0	2	2	4
9	Venezuela (VEN)	0	1	0	1
10	Antigua and Barbuda (ATG)	0	0	1	1
10	Dominican Republic (DOM)	0	0	1	1
10	Trinidad and Tobago (TTO)	0	0	1	1
Totals (12 entries)		41	41	40	122

== See also ==
- 1985 in athletics (track and field)
