= 1983 Central American and Caribbean Championships in Athletics =

- Dates: 22–24 July
- Host city: Havana, Cuba
- Venue: Estadio Pedro Marrero

The 1983 Central American and Caribbean Championships in Athletics were held at the Estadio Pedro Marrero in Havana, Cuba between 22–24 July.

== Medal summary ==
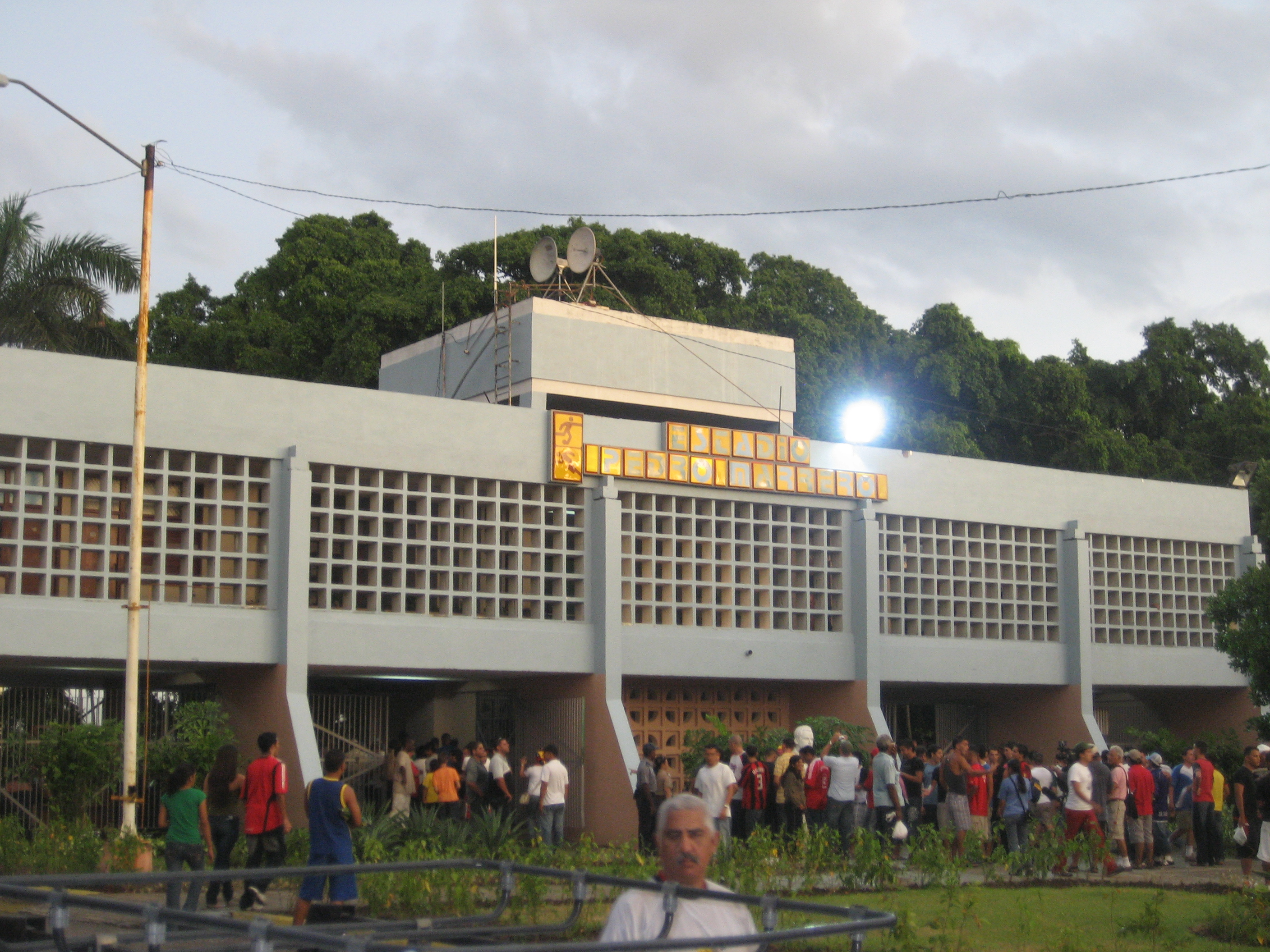
Host venue in Havana.

=== Men's events ===
Event	Gold		Silver		Bronze	
100 metres (wind: +1.9 m/s)	Juan Núñez; Dominican Republic	10.16 CR NR	Tomás González; Cuba	10.37	Florencio Aguilar; Panama	10.48
200 metres (wind: +0.7 m/s)	Juan Núñez; Dominican Republic	20.65 NR	Tomás González; Cuba	20.96	Fabian Whymns; Bahamas	21.19
400 metres	Lázaro Martínez; Cuba	45.91	Agustín Pavó; Cuba	46.74	Edison Reyes; Venezuela	46.95
800 metres	Bárbaro Serrano; Cuba	1:47.67	Oslen Barr; Guyana	1:48.25	Hilario Barnet; Cuba	1:48.89
1500 metres	Ignacio Melecio; Mexico	3:46.66	Jorge Poll; Cuba	3:46.71	Félix Mesa; Cuba	3:47.59
5000 metres	Gerardo Alcalá; Mexico	14:11.91	Germán Peña; Colombia	14:22.45	Eduardo Navas; Venezuela	14:24.42
10,000 metres	Gerardo Alcalá; Mexico	31:05.86	Navel Parra; Cuba	31:10.99	Eddy Ríos; Cuba	31:16.50
Marathon	Víctor Mora; Colombia	2:58:51	Héctor Rodríguez; Colombia	2:59:35	Juan Brito; Colombia	3:01:31
110 metres hurdles (wind: +2.5 m/s)	Alejandro Casañas; Cuba	13.61w	Modesto Castillo; Dominican Republic	13.79w	Ángel Bueno; Cuba	13.93w
400 metres hurdles	David Charlton; Bahamas	50.07 CR	Greg Rolle; Bahamas	50.87	Victor Gómez; Cuba	51.24
3000 metres steeplechase	César Santiago; Puerto Rico	8:48.80	Rafael Colmenares; Venezuela	8:49.90	José Cobo; Cuba	8:55.70
4 × 100 metres relay	Cuba; Tomás González; Ángel Bueno; Israel Alfonso; Loreto Valdes	39.81	Bahamas; Austin Albury; Joey Wells; Fabian Whymns; Ricardo Gray	40.34	Venezuela; Hipolito Brown; Ángel Andrade; Alberto Paolo Lugo; Franco Francis	40.64
4 × 400 metres relay	Cuba; Lázaro Martínez; Agustín Pavó; Carlos Reyté; Roberto Ramos	3:05.12	Barbados; David Charlton; Allan Ingraham; Greg Rolle; Ricardo Gray	3:07.06	Venezuela; Erick Phillips; Aaron Phillips; Ramon Edison Reyes ?	3:08.56
20 km road walk	David Castro; Cuba	1:29:44	Querubín Moreno; Colombia	1:29:54	Marcelino Colín; Mexico	1:33:49
High jump	Jorge Alfaro; Cuba	2.25 =CR	Clarence Saunders; Bermuda	2.19	Javier Sotomayor; Cuba	2.17
Pole vault	Edgardo Rivera; Puerto Rico	5.20 CR	Brian Morrissette; U.S. Virgin Islands	5.10	Rubén Camino; Cuba	5.00
Long jump	Juan Felipe Ortíz; Cuba	8.04 CR	Joey Wells; Bahamas	8.04	Jaime Jefferson; Cuba	8.03
Triple jump	Jorge Reyna; Cuba	16.95 CR	Lázaro Balcindes; Cuba	16.58	Ernesto Torres; Puerto Rico	15.91
Shot put	Paul Ruiz; Cuba	17.76	William Romero; Venezuela	16.29	Marciso Boué; Cuba	15.90
Discus throw	Bradley Cooper; Bahamas	63.26	Juan Martínez; Cuba	63.12	Raúl Calderón; Cuba	57.00
Hammer throw	Genovevo Morejón; Cuba	67.60 CR	Vicente Sánchez; Cuba	64.24	Luis Martínez; Puerto Rico	56.90
Javelin throw	Reinaldo Patterson; Cuba	79.76	Martín Álvarez; Cuba	76.74	Juan de la Garza; Mexico	75.22
Decathlon	Pedro Herrera; Cuba	7358 CR	Guillermo Sánchez; Mexico	7224	Douglas Rosado; Puerto Rico	6974
50 km road walk	Arturo Bravo; Mexico	4:21:01 CR	Rolando Hernández; Cuba	4:46:36	Félix Pérez; Cuba	4:53:18

=== Women's events ===
Event	Gold		Silver		Bronze	
100 metres (wind: +0.9 m/s)	Luisa Ferrer; Cuba	11.52	Pauline Davis; Bahamas	11.60	Susana Armenteros; Cuba	11.66
200 metres	Luisa Ferrer; Cuba	23.38w	Pauline Davis; Bahamas	23.65w	Nilsa París; Puerto Rico	23.70w
400 metres	Ana Fidelia Quirot; Cuba	52.89	Mercedes Álvarez; Cuba	53.47	Oralee Fowler; Bahamas	54.57
800 metres	Nery McKeen; Cuba	2:04.26 CR	María Ribeaux; Cuba	2:06.84	Adriana Marchena; Venezuela	2:09.20
1500 metres	Eloína Kerr; Cuba	4:21.06 CR	Janice Carlo; Puerto Rico	4:25.09	Adriana Marchena; Venezuela	4:26.57
3000 metres	Sergia Martínez; Cuba	9:36.75 CR	Fabiola Rueda; Colombia	9:40.10	María Cuesta; Cuba	9:58.61
100 metres hurdles	Grisel Machado; Cuba	13.64 CR	Julieta Rosseaux; Cuba	14.19	Angie Marie Regis; Venezuela	14.23
400 metres hurdles	Alma Vázquez; Mexico	59.57	Felicia Candelario; Dominican Republic	60.06	Vilma París; Puerto Rico	60.84
4 × 100 metres relay	Bahamas; Pauline Davis; Shonel Ferguson; Oralee Fowler; Joanne Major	45.26	Puerto Rico; Vilma París; Nilsa París; Margaret de Jesús; Madeline de Jesús	46.69		
4 × 400 metres relay	Cuba; Ana Fidelia Quirot; Mercedes Álvarez; Nery McKeen; Mercedes Mesa	3:34.97 CR	Puerto Rico; Vilma París; Nilsa París; Margaret de Jesús; Madeline de Jesús	3:39.36	Bahamas	3:54.37
High jump	Victoria Despaigne; Cuba	1.78	Amalia Montes; Mexico	1.75	Eunice Greene; Bahamas	1.75
Long jump	Shonel Ferguson; Bahamas	6.65 CR	Madeline de Jesús; Puerto Rico	6.49	Adelina Polledo; Cuba	6.23
Shot put	Marcelina Rodríguez; Cuba	17.00	Laverne Eve; Bahamas	14.75	Lissete Martínez; Cuba	14.67
Discus throw	Carmen Romero; Cuba	58.58	Hilda Ramos; Cuba	57.80	Yunaira Piña; Venezuela	46.04
Javelin throw	Iris de Grasse; Cuba	59.74 CR	María Beltrán; Cuba	56.40	Mariela Riera; Venezuela	53.84
Heptathlon	Victoria Despaigne; Cuba	5469 CR	Leyda Castro; Dominican Republic	5178	Genoveva Montano; Cuba	4870

== Medal table ==
* Host nation (Cuba)

Rank	Nation	Gold	Silver	Bronze	Total
1	Cuba (CUB)*	26	15	16	57
2	Mexico (MEX)	5	2	2	9
3	Bahamas (BAH)	4	6	4	14
4	Puerto Rico (PUR)	2	4	5	11
5	Dominican Republic (DOM)	2	3	0	5
6	Colombia (COL)	1	4	2	7
7	Venezuela (VEN)	0	2	9	11
8	Barbados (BAR)	0	1	0	1
8	Bermuda (BER)	0	1	0	1
8	Guyana (GUY)	0	1	0	1
8	U.S. Virgin Islands (VIR)	0	1	0	1
12	Panama (PAN)	0	0	1	1
Totals (12 entries)		40	40	39	119

== See also ==
- 1983 in athletics (track and field)
