= 1978 Central American and Caribbean Junior Championships in Athletics =

III Central American and Caribbean Junior Championships
- Dates: 25–28 August
- Host city: Xalapa, Mexico
- Level: Junior and Youth
- Events: 69 (36 junior, 33 youth)
- Participation: about 293 (157 junior, 136 youth) athletes from 10 nations

The 3rd Central American and Caribbean Junior Championships was held in Xalapa, Mexico, on 25–28 August 1978. This was already the second time that the city was hosting this event after the 2nd junior CAC games in 1976. Moreover, both the inaugural 1st CAC senior championships in 1967 and the VI CAC senior championships in 1977 took place in Xalapa, Veracruz. Both junior (under-20) and youth (under-17) competitions were held.

== Event summary ==
The medal count is headed by Cuba, both in gold medals (25) and total number of medals (60).

In the under-20 men category, Anthony Bullard from the Bahamas gained 2 gold (400m, 4 × 100 m relay) and a silver medal (4 × 400 m relay), whereas Eric Berrie from Barbados got 2 gold medals.

In the under-20 women category, Norma Murray from Jamaica won 3 golds (200m, 400m, 4 × 100 m relay) plus one silver medal (4 × 400 m relay). Doreen Small, Jamaican compatriot, won 2 gold medals (100m, 4 × 100 m relay).

In the under-17 men category, David Charlton from the Bahamas won 3 gold medals (400m, high jump, 4 × 400 m relay) and 1 silver medal (4 × 100 m relay). Moreover, both Wayne Morrison and Dennis Wallace from Jamaica won 2 golds (100m, 4 × 100 m relay) and (200m, 4 × 100 m relay), respectively, and 2 silver medals (200m, 4 × 400 m relay) and (400m, 4 × 400 m relay), respectively. The Cubans Lázaro González and Juan Pineira won 2 gold (shot put, discus throw) and 1 silver medal (hammer throw), and 2 gold (100m hurdles, 300m hurdles) and 1 bronze (4 × 100 m relay), respectively.

Top athletes in the under-17 women category was Mary Ann Higgs from the Bahamas winning 4 golds (100m, 200m, 4 × 100 m relay, 4 × 400 m relay) and 1 silver (400m), as well as Bahamian compatriot Monique Millar winning 2 golds (4 × 100 m relay, 4 × 400 m relay) and 3 bronze medals (100m, 200m, 400m).

In addition, the championships saw early appearances of multi-medalist Merlene Ottey from Jamaica gaining 1 gold (4 × 100 m relay), 1 silver (4 × 400 m relay), and 1 bronze medal (200m) at this event in the under-20 category, before winning, for example, 3 gold, 4 silver and 7 bronze medals at various IAAF World Championships in Athletics between 1983 and 1997, and 3 silver and 6 bronze medals at various Olympic Games between 1980 and 2000. Grace Jackson from Jamaica, 200m silver medalist at the 1988 Olympic Games in Seoul, Korea, won the under-20 high jump competition, whereas Cuban athlete Silvia Costa, high jump silver medalist at the 1993 World Championships in Athletics in Stuttgart, Germany, won gold in high jump and silver in 100m hurdles in the under-17 category.

== Medal summary ==
Medal winners are published by category: Junior A, Male, Junior A, Female, and combined Junior B. Complete results can be found on the World Junior Athletics History website.

=== Male Junior A (under 20) ===
Event	Gold		Silver		Bronze	
100 metres	Eric Berrie (BAR)	10.65A	Israel Alfonso (CUB)	10.92A	Fabian Whymns (BAH)	10.93A
200 metres	Eric Berrie (BAR)	21.83A	Israel Alfonso (CUB)	22.04A	Fabian Whymns (BAH)	22.18A
400 metres	Anthony Bullard (BAH)	48.50A	Alfonso Pérez (MEX)	49.58A	José Obispo (VEN)	49.73A
800 metres	Jesús Salazar (CRC)	1:54.2A	Gonzalo Huggins (VEN)	1:54.3A	Agustín Hernández (MEX)	1:54.4A
1500 metres	Agustín Hernández (MEX)	3:59.0A	Martín Pitayo (MEX)	4:02.5A	Luis Figueros (CRC)	4:08.0A
5000 metres	Valentín Ramos (MEX)	15:17.8A	Oscar Valero (GUA)	15:19.8A	Isaías Román (MEX)	15:24.4A
10,000 metres	Héctor Díaz (PUR)	31:51.8A	Oscar Valero (GUA)	33:11.0A	William Rodríguez (VEN)	32:44.0A
3000 metres steeplechase	Mario Wimber (MEX)	9:36.8A	Oscar Valero (GUA)	9:54.8A	Manuel Garrido (VEN)	10:04.8A
110 metres hurdles	John Messam (JAM)	14.74A	John Dowe (BAH)	14.78A	Ernesto González (CUB)	15.03A
400 metres hurdles	Carlos Yambot (PUR)	54.26A	Alberto Queralta (CUB)	54.89A	Miguel Carreón (MEX)	56.14A
High jump	Domingo Herrera (CUB)	1.95A	Carlos Casar (MEX)	1.95A	Desmond Morris (JAM)	1.90A
Pole vault	Jorge Sánchez (CUB)	4.00A	Aurelio Falls (CUB)	3.85A	Michael Johnson (JAM)	3.70A
Long jump	Gabriel Gil (MEX)	6.90A	Ricardo Campbell (CRC)	6.59A	Francisco Francis (VEN)	6.50A
Triple jump	Jesús Aguilasocho (MEX)	14.27A	Ricardo Campbell (CRC)	14.23A	Francisco Francis (VEN)	14.07A
Shot put	Alfredo Gómez (PUR)	16.14A	Félix Báez (CUB)	15.25A	Rafael Arrañaga (VEN)	15.11A
Discus throw	Eric Rodríguez (PUR)	43.52A	Rafael Arrañaga (VEN)	42.70A	Félix Báez (CUB)	41.10A
Hammer throw	Miguel Carro (CUB)	56.94A	Rafael Arrañaga (VEN)	54.22A	Félix Báez (CUB)	52.20A
Javelin throw	Alfredo Portillo (MEX)	59.96A	William Landaeta (VEN)	59.38A	Antonio Serrano (CRC)	57.76A
Decathlon	Pedro Herrera (CUB)	5840A	Nilo Ramírez (CUB)	5724A	Ricardo Casanova (MEX)	5444A
10,000 metres track walk	Raúl Sánchez (MEX)	47:36.2A	Sebastián Primo (MEX)	48:10.4A	Rubén Hernández (CUB)	49:01.8A
4 × 100 metres relay	Bahamas; Ken Wilson; Anthony Bullard; Fabian Whymms; A. Smith	43.09A	Venezuela; Ángel Andrade; Nelson Maan; Antonio Rivas; José Paredes	43.13A	Jamaica; Clyde McGregor; Desmond Morris; John Messam; David Palmer	43.21A
4 × 400 metres relay	Venezuela; Sequera; Raúl Martínez; Pedro Martínez; José Obispo	3:21.6A	Bahamas; Fabian Whymms; Ken Wilson; A. Smith; Anthony Bullard	3:22.2A	Mexico; Varela; Higuera; Roman Sobrevilla; Alfonso Pérez	3:22.2A

=== Female Junior A (under 20) ===
Event	Gold		Silver		Bronze	
100 metres	Doreen Small (JAM)	12.30A	Sonia Clarke (BAR)	12.38A	Marta Zulueta (CUB)	12.54A
200 metres	Normalee Murray (JAM)	24.87A	Sonia Clarke (BAR)	25.29A	Merlene Ottey (JAM)	25.34A
400 metres	Normalee Murray (JAM)	54.96A	Mirta Armenteros (CUB)	57.86A	Yvonne Sturrup (BAH)	58.02A
800 metres	Ana Orendaín (MEX)	2:12.4A	Yvonne Sturrup (BAH)	2:17.5A	Cristina Estrello (MEX)	2:28.5A
1500 metres	Sergia Martínez (CUB)	4:50.1A	Serene Mitchell (JAM)	4:52.0A	Cristina Estrello (MEX)	5:08.0A
100 metres hurdles	Emma Mestre (CUB)	14.90A	Elida Aveillé (CUB)	15.18A	Sharon Moffat (JAM)	15.32A
High jump	Grace Jackson (JAM)	1.65A	María Betancourt (CUB)	1.55A	Audrey Hunter (JAM)	1.55A
Long jump	Nieves Acosta (CUB)	5.79A	Sharol Henry (JAM)	5.63A	Audrey Hunter (JAM)	5.33A
Shot put	Marcelina Rodríguez (CUB)	13.90A	Juana Martínez (MEX)	12.00A	Marvelis Castillo (VEN)	11.58A
Discus throw	Ana Haydée Núñez (CUB)	39.82A	Marcelina Rodríguez (CUB)	39.50A	Juana Martínez (MEX)	38.34A
Javelin throw	Mayra Vila (CUB)	48.96A	Ana Haydée Núñez (CUB)	45.92A	Ana López (MEX)	34.46A
Pentathlon	Ansis Salazar (CUB)	3127A	Miriam González (CUB)	2910A	Alma Preciado (MEX)	2834A
4 × 100 metres relay	Jamaica; Marlene Lewin; Normalee Murray; Doreen Small; Merlene Ottey	47.12A	Cuba; Silvia Costa; Elida Aveillé; Natividad Tamayo; Marta Zulueta	48.02A	Mexico; Maria Emilia Lenk; Maria Vizcarra; Gabriela Romero; Alejandra Flores	49.12A
4 × 400 metres relay	Cuba; Ansis Salazar; Marta Zulueta; Natividad Tamayo; Mirta Armenteros	3:57.64A	Jamaica; Merlene Ottey; Marlene Lewin; Serene Mitchell; Normalee Murray	3:58.8A	Mexico; Pérez; Rosalia Martínez; Sánchez; Ana Orendaín	4:01.8A

=== Male Junior B (under 17) ===
Event	Gold		Silver		Bronze	
100 metres	Wayne Morrison (JAM)	11.29A	Norman Edwards (JAM)	11.39A	Dudley Parker (BAH)	11.40A
200 metres	Dennis Wallace (JAM)	22.20A	Wayne Morrison (JAM)	22.75A	Dudley Parker (BAH)	23.08A
400 metres	David Charlton (BAH)	49.18A	Dennis Wallace (JAM)	49.40A	Craig Fraser (BAH)	50.21A
1000 metres	Felipe Treviño (MEX)	2:38.2A	Oscar Campbell (JAM)	2:38.4A	Jesús Herrera (MEX)	2:38.8A
3000 metres	Jesús Herrera (MEX)	9:04.4A	Felipe Treviño (MEX)	9:04.4A	Ramón Wilson (CUB)	9:23.8A
2000 metres steeplechase	Alejandro Meza (MEX)	6:23.8A	Ramón Wilson (CUB)	6:33.0A	Salvador Meza (MEX)	6:43.0A
110 metres hurdles	Juan Pineira (CUB)	14.80A	Mario Arguedas (CRC)	15.00A	Ángel Bueno (CUB)	15.02A
300 metres hurdles	Juan Pineira (CUB)	38.5A	Eduardo Wimber (MEX)	40.5A	Ángel Bueno (CUB)	40.8A
High jump	David Charlton (BAH)	1.90A	Sergio Torres (MEX)	1.85A	Delroy Poyser (JAM)	1.85A
Pole vault	Máximo Falls (CUB)	3.60A	Jorge Drecka (VEN)	3.50A	Edgardo Villalobos (MEX)	3.15A
Long jump	Jorge Luis Alfaro (CUB)	6.60A	Félix Cabrera (CUB)	6.16A	Johnny Roberts (BAH)	6.09A
Triple jump	Norbert Elliott (BAH)	14.13A	Jorge Luis Alfaro (CUB)	13.99A	Félix Cabrera (CUB)	13.95A
Shot put	Lázaro González (CUB)	16.16A	Raleigh Ferguson (BAH)	15.58A	José Calderón (VEN)	15.30A
Discus throw	Lázaro González (CUB)	47.00A	Alexis Allen (CRC)	44.48A	Derrick Horsham (JAM)	42.82A
Hammer throw	César Esquerra (CUB)	62.64A	Lázaro González (CUB)	53.72A	César Díaz (MEX)	41.96A
Javelin throw	Benjamín Hernández (MEX)	47.36A	Lázaro Hernández (CUB)	47.06A	Alberto Cisneros (GUA)	46.66A
Pentathlon	José Díaz (MEX)	2896A	Alexander Torrealba (VEN)	2526A	Lázaro Hernández (CUB)	2492A
5000 metres track walk	Víctor Sánchez (MEX)	22:20A	Eduardo Linares (MEX)	24:01A	Lázaro Alemán (CUB)	25:47A
4 × 100 metres relay	Jamaica; Norman Edwards; Dennis Wallace; Kenneth Thompson; Wayne Morrison	43.10A	Bahamas; Craig Fraser; Allan Ingraham; Dudley Parker; David Charlton	43.45A	Cuba; Rubén Rowle; Ángel Bueno; Vicente Zúñiga; Juan Pineira	43.94A
4 × 400 metres relay	Bahamas; Norbert Elliott; David Charlton; Allan Ingraham; Craig Fraser	3:25.6A	Jamaica; Howard Thomas; Wayne Morrison; Clarke; Dennis Wallace	3:27.2A	Mexico; Guillermo Arnold; Sahagún; Raúl Morales; Eduardo Wimber	3:27.8A

=== Female Junior B (under 17) ===
Event	Gold		Silver		Bronze	
100 metres	Mary Ann Higgs (BAH)	12.01A	Fredericka Wright (JAM)	12.35A	Monique Millar (BAH)	12.47A
200 metres	Mary Ann Higgs (BAH)	24.70A	Fredericka Wright (JAM)	25.00A	Monique Millar (BAH)	25.11A
400 metres	Fredericka Wright (JAM)	55.53A	Mary Ann Higgs (BAH)	56.45A	Monique Millar (BAH)	56.46A
1000 metres	Eugenie Beason (JAM)	3:00.6A	Sharon Powell (JAM)	3:00.6A	María Montero (CUB)	3:03.4A
100 metres hurdles	Amparo Macías (MEX)	15.41A	Silvia Costa (CUB)	15.76A	Angie Marie Regis (VEN)	15.78A
High jump	Silvia Costa (CUB)	1.60A	Amalia Montes (MEX)	1.55A	Eunice Greene (BAH)	1.50A
Long jump	Barbara Martínez (CUB)	5.34A	Sorelis Bohórquez (VEN)	5.33A	Emma Saldaña (MEX)	5.19A
Shot put	Eva Sánchez (CUB)	14.52A	Judith Rivera (PUR)	11.62A	Elisa Magana (MEX)	10.66A
Discus throw	María Portuondo (CUB)	39.06A	Eva Sánchez (CUB)	38.40A	Mónica Ávalos (MEX)	37.40A
Javelin throw	Iris de Grasse (CUB)	42.54A	Judy Cabrera (VEN)	37.58A	Wendy Griffith (BAR)	36.54A
Pentathlon	Magdalena Companioni (CUB)	3034A	Ingeborg Sáenz (MEX)	2741A	Isabel Burgueño (MEX)	2661A
4 × 100 metres relay	Bahamas; Debbie Greene; Monique Millar; Eunice Greene; Mary Ann Higgs	48.50A	Cuba; Miriam Ferrer; Surella Morales; Magda Companioni; Barbara Martínez	49.25A	Mexico; Rutilla Tello; Alma Vázquez; Díaz; Amparo Macías	49.85A
4 × 400 metres relay	Bahamas; Debbie Greene; Monique Millar; Eunice Greene; Mary Ann Higgs	3:57.4A	Mexico; Suad Ayud; Marta Vázquez; Amador; Leticia Canedo	4:01.8A	Cuba; Luisa Peña; Risos; Barbara Martínez; María Montero	4:04.2A

== Medal table (unofficial) ==
* Host nation (MEX)

Rank	Nation	Gold	Silver	Bronze	Total
1	Cuba (CUB)	25	21	14	60
2	MEX*	15	12	22	49
3	Jamaica (JAM)	11	11	9	31
4	Bahamas (BAH)	10	6	11	27
5	Puerto Rico (PUR)	4	1	0	5
6	Barbados (BAR)	2	2	1	5
7	Venezuela (VEN)	1	9	9	19
8	Costa Rica (CRC)	1	4	2	7
9	Guatemala (GUA)	0	3	1	4
Totals (9 entries)		69	69	69	207

== Participation (unofficial) ==
Detailed result lists can be found on the World Junior Athletics History website. They comprise about 293 athletes (157 junior (under-20) and 136 youth (under-17)) from about 10 countries:

- Bahamas (22)
- Barbados (8)
- Costa Rica (19)
- Cuba (57)
- Guatemala (17)
- Jamaica (28)
- Mexico (90)
- Nicaragua (8)
- Puerto Rico (16)
- Venezuela (28)
