= Athletics at the 1986 Central American and Caribbean Games =

Athletics at the XV CAC Games
- Dates: 29 June – 4 July
- Host city: Santiago de los Caballeros, Dominican Republic
- Venue: Estadio La Barranquita
- Events: 43
- Records set: 19 GR

The athletics competition in the 1986 Central American and Caribbean Games were held in Santiago de los Caballeros, Dominican Republic.

It was the first time that women's 10,000 metres, marathon and racewalking events were held.

== Medal summary ==
=== Men's events ===
Event	Gold		Silver		Bronze	
100 metres (wind: -1.6 m/s)	Andrés Simón; Cuba	10.29	Juan Núñez; Dominican Republic	10.38	Ray Stewart; Jamaica	10.48
200 metres (wind: NWI)	Leandro Peñalver; Cuba	20.70	Juan Núñez; Dominican Republic	20.79	Leroy Reid; Jamaica	20.90
400 metres	Félix Stevens; Cuba	44.98	Ian Morris; Trinidad and Tobago	45.02	Elvis Forde; Barbados	45.65
800 metres	Oslen Barr; Guyana	1:49.42	William Wuycke; Venezuela	1:49.45	Ángel Osoria; Cuba	1:50.35
1500 metres	Jacinto Navarrete; Colombia	3:43.72	Germán Beltrán; Venezuela	3:43.99	Félix Mesa; Cuba	3:45.50
5000 metres	Mauricio González; Mexico	14:11.73	Marcos Barreto; Mexico	14:12.73	Juan Jesús Linares; Cuba	14:13.76
10,000 metres	Francisco Pacheco; Mexico	29:39.56	José Alcalá; Mexico	30:05.35	Eduardo Maldonado; Puerto Rico	30:29.39
Marathon	Jesús Amariles; Colombia	2:23:00	Radamés González; Cuba	2:25:54	Dieudonné Lamothe; Haiti	2:32:11
110 metres hurdles (wind: +1.0 m/s)	Ángel Bueno; Cuba	13.86	Juan Saborit; Cuba	13.91	Ernesto Torres; Puerto Rico	14.10
400 metres hurdles	Winthrop Graham; Jamaica	50.03 GR	David Charlton; Bahamas	50.14	Jesús Aguilasocho; Mexico	50.48
3000 metre steeplechase	Juan Ramón Conde; Cuba	8:42.38 GR	Juan Jesús Linares; Cuba	8:46.11	Rafael Colmenares; Venezuela	8:52.83
4 × 100 metres relay	Cuba; Osvaldo Lara; Leandro Peñalver; Sergio Querol; Andrés Simón	38.74 GR	Jamaica; Gregory Meghoo; Andrew Smith; Raymond Stewart; Leroy Reid	38.96	Dominican Republic; José Méndez; Gerardo Suero; Fernando Reynoso; Juan Núñez	39.56
4 × 400 metres relay	Cuba; Leandro Peñalver; Agustín Pavó; Jorge Valentín; Félix Stevens	3:02.41 GR	Trinidad and Tobago; Ali St. Louis; Ian Morris; Michael Paul; Carlyle Bernard	3:04.57	Barbados; Henriko Atkins; David Carter; Ezra Catwell; Elvis Forde	3:06.88
20 kilometre road walk	Ernesto Canto; Mexico	1:26:25 GR	Martín Bermúdez; Mexico	1:27:23	Héctor Moreno; Colombia	1:28:41
50 kilometre road walk	Martín Bermúdez; Mexico	4:04:47 GR	Félix Gómez; Mexico	4:07:20	Mauricio Cortés; Colombia	4:26:27
High jump	Francisco Centelles; Cuba	2.22	Bárbaro Díaz; Cuba; Alfredo Mejía; Dominican Republic	2.20		
Pole vault	Rubén Camino; Cuba	5.20 GR	José Echevarría; Cuba	5.00	Efram Meléndez; Puerto Rico	4.90
Long jump	Jaime Jefferson; Cuba	8.34 GR	Elmer Williams; Puerto Rico	7.81	Ubaldo Duany; Cuba	7.57
Triple jump	Lázaro Betancourt; Cuba	16.83 GR	Frank Rutherford; Bahamas	16.67	Norbert Elliott; Bahamas	16.40
Shot put	Paul Ruiz; Cuba	19.01 GR	Marciso Boué; Cuba	18.59	Hubert Maingot; Trinidad and Tobago	16.99
Discus throw	Luis Delís; Cuba	63.16	Juan Martínez; Cuba	62.30	Brad Cooper; Bahamas	61.40
Hammer throw	Vicente Sánchez; Cuba	68.04	Eladio Hernández; Cuba	64.08	David Castrillón; Colombia	63.68
Javelin throw (new model)	Ramón González; Cuba	77.32 GR	Juan de la Garza; Mexico	74.28	Máximo Driggs; Cuba	74.06
Decathlon	Ernesto Betancourt; Cuba	7333	Jorge Caraballo; Cuba	7079	Ron McPhee; Bahamas	6773

=== Women's events ===
Event	Gold		Silver		Bronze	
100 metres (wind: -1.0 m/s)	Pauline Davis-Thompson; Bahamas	11.51	Camille Coates; Jamaica	11.69	Amparo Caicedo; Colombia	11.85
200 metres (wind: +0.4 m/s)	Pauline Davis-Thompson; Bahamas	23.06	Camille Coates; Jamaica	23.44	Amparo Caicedo; Colombia	23.52
400 metres	Ana Fidelia Quirot; Cuba	51.01	Norfalia Carabalí; Colombia	52.46	Cathy Rattray; Jamaica	52.67
800 metres	Ana Fidelia Quirot; Cuba	1:59.00 GR	Angelita Lind; Puerto Rico	2:02.12	Imelda González; Mexico	2:02.26
1500 metres	Angelita Lind; Puerto Rico	4:18.67	Imelda González; Mexico	4:19.58	Nery McKeen; Cuba	4:23.34
3000 metres	Fabiola Rueda; Colombia	9:30.25 GR	Sergia Martínez; Cuba	9:36.84	Santa Velázquez; Mexico	9:42.36
10,000 metres	Genoveva Domínguez; Mexico	36:24.39 GR	Maricela Hurtado; Mexico	36:29.12	Maribel Durruty; Cuba	38:20.27
Marathon	Naidi Nazario; Puerto Rico	2:55:44 GR	Maribel Durruty; Cuba	3:08:57	Aida Torres; Puerto Rico	3:10:19
100 metres hurdles (wind: -0.1 m/s)	Odalys Adams; Cuba	13.50	Grisel Machado; Cuba	13.56	Sandra Taváres; Mexico	13.86
400 metres hurdles	Flora Hyacinth; U.S. Virgin Islands	57.55 GR	Tania Fernández; Cuba	57.60	Alma Vázquez; Mexico	59.05
4 × 100 metres relay	Cuba; Idania Pino; Luisa Ferrer; Susana Armenteros; María Zamora	44.55	Bahamas; Carmel Major; Pauline Davis; Deborah Greene; Shonel Ferguson	45.49	Mexico; Guadalupe García; Alma Vázquez; Alejandra Flores; Sandra Taváres	45.58
4 × 400 metres relay	Cuba; Ester Petitón; Odalys Hernández; Nery McKeen; Ana Fidelia Quirot	3:33.60	Puerto Rico; Virgen Fontánez; Roxanne Oliver; Mercedes Ríos; Angelita Lind	3:41.32	Dominican Republic; María Acevedo; Ana Peña; Virginia Cruz; Glennis Reynoso	3:47.84
10,000 metre track walk	María Colín; Mexico	50:43.62 GR	Graciela Mendoza; Mexico	51:56.62	Margarita Morales; Cuba	55:00.93
High jump	Silvia Costa; Cuba	1.96 GR	Cristina Fink; Mexico	1.81	Laura Agront; Puerto Rico	1.79
Long jump	Eloína Echevarría; Cuba	6.61 GR	Shonel Ferguson; Bahamas	6.43	Flora Hyacinth; U.S. Virgin Islands	6.36
Shot put	Marcelina Rodríguez; Cuba	17.22	Rosa Fernández; Cuba	17.17	María Isabel Urrutia; Colombia	14.48
Discus throw	Hilda Ramos; Cuba	63.44	Maritza Martén; Cuba	63.24	María Isabel Urrutia; Colombia	50.68
Javelin throw (old model)	María Caridad Colón; Cuba	67.00 GR	Ivonne Leal; Cuba	56.56	María González; Puerto Rico	54.38
Heptathlon	Caridad Balcindes; Cuba	5313	Leyda Castro; Dominican Republic	5025	Irina Ambulo; Panama	4997 (NR)

== Medal table ==
Rank	Nation	Gold	Silver	Bronze	Total
1	Cuba (CUB)	27	16	8	51
2	Mexico (MEX)	6	9	6	21
3	Colombia (COL)	3	1	7	11
4	Bahamas (BAH)	2	4	3	9
5	Puerto Rico (PUR)	2	3	6	11
6	Jamaica (JAM)	1	3	3	7
7	U.S. Virgin Islands (VIR)	1	0	1	2
8	Guyana (GUY)	1	0	0	1
9	Dominican Republic (DOM)	0	4	2	6
10	Trinidad and Tobago (TTO)	0	2	1	3
10	Venezuela (VEN)	0	2	1	3
12	Barbados (BAR)	0	0	2	2
13	Haiti (HAI)	0	0	1	1
13	Panama (PAN)	0	0	1	1
Totals (14 entries)		43	44	42	129
