= Carmelo Ríos (athlete) =

Puerto Rican long-distance runner (1959–2022)

Carmelo Ríos Figueroa (October 11, 1959 – October 21, 2022) was a Puerto Rican long-distance runner, who competed for his native country in the men's 3000 m steeplechase at the 1984 Summer Olympics. He set his personal best (8:28.89) in that event on June 17, 1983 in Indianapolis, Indiana.

== Background ==
Ríos was the silver medalist at the 1983 Pan American Games and competed at the 1983 World Championships in Athletics later that year, where he was knocked out in the heats stage. In his only Olympic appearance in 1984, he finished twelfth in his semi-final in the men's steeplechase. He took the bronze medal at the 1985 CAC Championships.

Ríos attended California Polytechnic State University, San Luis Obispo, where he still holds the school record in the Steeplechase set at the USA Outdoor Track and Field Championships in Indianapolis, Indiana at 8:28.89 from 1983. Prior to Cal Poly, he competed for Long Beach City College, winning the state community college championship back to back in 1979 and 80. He was also the Southern California champion at 10,000 meters and the third individual at the State Cross Country championships. In 2013, he was honored in the Long Beach City College "Hall of Champions."

== Death ==
Ríos died on October 21, 2022, at the age of 63.

== Achievements ==
Year	Competition	Venue	Position	Event	Notes
Representing Puerto Rico
1983	Pan American Games	Caracas, Venezuela	2nd	3000 m steeple	9:01.47
1984	Olympic Games	Los Angeles, United States	25th	3000 m steeple	8:44.70
1985	Central American and Caribbean Championships	Nassau, Bahamas	3rd	3000 m steeple	8:40.90
1986	Central American and Caribbean Games	Santiago de los Caballeros, Dominican Republic	4th	3000 m steeple	8:53.25
1988	Ibero-American Championships	Mexico City, Mexico	4th	3000 m steeple	9:24.44 A
