= Rosa Fernández =

Personal information
- Born: 7 October 1957

Sport
- Sport: Athletics
- Event: Shot put

Rosa Fernández (born 7 October 1957) is a retired Cuban athlete who specialised in the shot put. She won multiple medals at regional level. In 1983 she was disqualified for doping and her silver medal at the 1983 Pan American Games was stripped.

Her personal best in the event is 18.51 metres set in Tampere in 1983.

== International competitions ==
Year	Competition	Venue	Position	Event	Notes
Representing Cuba
1975	Central American and Caribbean Championships	Ponce, Puerto Rico	2nd	Shot put	14.33 m
1979	Central American and Caribbean Championships	Guadalajara, Mexico	1st	Shot put	17.88 m
1981	Central American and Caribbean Championships	Santo Domingo, Dominican Republic	2nd	Shot put	15.35 m
1982	Central American and Caribbean Games	Havana, Cuba	2nd	Shot put	17.54 m
1983	Pan American Games	Mexico City, Mexico	–	Shot put	DQ
1985	Central American and Caribbean Championships	Nassau, Bahamas	2nd	Shot put	16.76 m
1985	World Cup	Canberra, Australia	7th	Shot put	16.65 m^{1}
1986	Central American and Caribbean Games	Santiago, Dominican Republic	2nd	Shot put	17.17 m

^{1}Representing the Americas
