= Juan Saborit =

Cuban hurdler

Personal information
- Full name: Juan Saborit Cespedes
- Born: 6 May 1956
- Height: 1.85 m (6 ft 1 in)
- Weight: 74 kg (163 lb)

Sport
- Sport: Athletics
- Event: 110 metres hurdles
Medal record
Representing Cuba
Pan American Games
Silver medal – second place	1979 San Juan	4x100m relay
Central American and Caribbean Games
Gold medal – first place	1982 Havana	4x100m relay
Silver medal – second place	1978 Medellin	4x100m relay
Silver medal – second place	1982 Havana	110m hurdles
Silver medal – second place	1986 Santiago	110m hurdles

Juan Saborit Cespedes (born 6 May 1956) is a Cuban former hurdler.

His personal best in the event is 13.78 seconds (+0.6 m/s, Budapest, 1982)

== International competitions ==
Year	Competition	Venue	Position	Event	Notes
Representing Cuba
1977	Universiade	Sofia, Bulgaria	4th	4 × 100 m relay	39.31
1978	Central American and Caribbean Games	Medellín, Colombia	2nd	4 × 100 m relay	39.44
1979	Pan American Games	San Juan, Puerto Rico	2nd	4 × 100 m relay	39.14
1981	Universiade	Bucharest, Romania	16th (sf)	110 m hurdles	14.46
1981	Universiade	Bucharest, Romania	4th	4 × 100 m relay	39.58
1982	Central American and Caribbean Games	Havana, Cuba	2nd	110 m hurdles	13.91
1982	Central American and Caribbean Games	Havana, Cuba	1st	4 × 100 m relay	39.15
1985	Central American and Caribbean Championships	Nassau, Bahamas	2nd	110 m hurdles	13.83
1986	Central American and Caribbean Games	Santiago, Dominican Republic	2nd	110 m hurdles	13.91
1986	Ibero-American Championships	Havana, Cuba	4th	110 m hurdles	14.10

^{1}Representing the Americas
