= Ángel Bueno =

Cuban athlete

Personal information
- Full name: Ángel Bueno Callaba
- Born: 2 March 1963
- Height: 1.77 m (5 ft 10 in)
- Weight: 73 kg (161 lb)

Sport
- Sport: Athletics
- Event: 110 metres hurdles

Ángel Bueno Callaba (born 2 March 1963) is a retired Cuban athlete who specialised in the 110 metres hurdles. He won multiple medals at regional level.

His personal best in the event is 13.81 seconds set in 1983 in Barcelona.

== International competitions ==
Year	Competition	Venue	Position	Event	Notes
Representing Cuba
1978	Central American and Caribbean; Junior Championships (U17)	Xalapa, Mexico	3rd	110 m hurdles (91.4 cm)	15.02
1978	Central American and Caribbean; Junior Championships (U17)	Xalapa, Mexico	3rd	300 m hurdles	40.8
1978	Central American and Caribbean; Junior Championships (U17)	Xalapa, Mexico	3rd	4 × 100 m relay	43.94
1978	Central American and Caribbean; Junior Championships (U17)	Xalapa, Mexico	4th	4 × 400 m relay	3:28.2
1982	Central American and Caribbean; Junior Championships (U20)	Bridgetown, Barbados	4th	200 m	21.53
1982	Central American and Caribbean; Junior Championships (U20)	Bridgetown, Barbados	1st	110 m hurdles	14.62
1982	Central American and Caribbean; Junior Championships (U20)	Bridgetown, Barbados	–	4 × 100 m relay	DNF
1982	Pan American Junior Championships	Barquisimeto, Venezuela	8th	100 m	11.12 (w)
1982	Pan American Junior Championships	Barquisimeto, Venezuela	1st	110 m hurdles	14.00
1983	Central American and Caribbean Championships	Havana, Cuba	3rd	110 m hurdles	13.93 (w)
1983	Central American and Caribbean Championships	Havana, Cuba	1st	4 × 100 m relay	39.81
1983	Ibero-American Championships	Barcelona, Spain	1st	110 m hurdles	13.81
1983	Ibero-American Championships	Barcelona, Spain	2nd	4 × 100 m relay	40.45
1986	Central American and Caribbean Games	Santiago, Dominican Republic	1st	110 m hurdles	13.86
1986	Ibero-American Championships	Havana, Cuba	3rd	110 m hurdles	14.08
1987	Central American and Caribbean Championships	Caracas, Venezuela	2nd	110 m hurdles	14.01
