= 1987 Central American and Caribbean Championships in Athletics =

Athletics tournament

- Dates: 24–26 July
- Host city: Caracas, Venezuela
- Venue: Estadio Olímpico

The 1987 Central American and Caribbean Championships in Athletics were held at the Estadio Olímpico in Caracas, Venezuela between 24–26 July.

== Medal summary ==
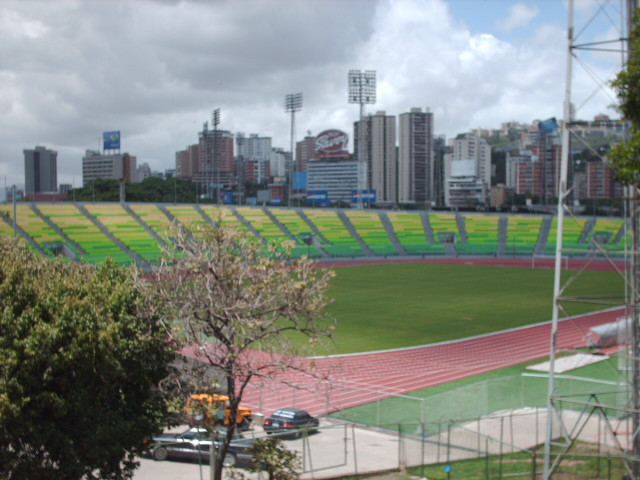
Host venue in Caracas.

=== Men's events ===
Event	Gold		Silver		Bronze	
100 metres (wind: -1.2 m/s)	Juan Núñez; Dominican Republic	10.22	Luis Morales; Puerto Rico	10.37	John Mair; Jamaica	10.39
200 metres (wind: +0.6 m/s)	Clive Wright; Jamaica	20.64	Juan Núñez; Dominican Republic	20.79	John Mair; Jamaica	20.99
400 metres	Elvis Forde; Barbados	45.63	Jesús Malavé; Venezuela	45.68	Ian Morris; Trinidad and Tobago	45.90
800 metres	William Wuycke; Venezuela	1:49.10	Raúl Mesa; Cuba	1:49.80	Dennis Hines; Jamaica	1:50.30
1500 metres	Raúl Mesa; Cuba	3:46.17	José Isaac; Cuba	3:46.82	Linton McKenzie; Jamaica	3:46.87
5000 metres	Pablo Cerón; Mexico	14:06.20	Pedro Ortiz; Colombia	14:09.58	Carlos Quiñones; Puerto Rico	14:13.53
10,000 metres	Rafael Zepeda; Mexico	29:46.62 CR	Silvio Salazar; Colombia	30:38.69	José Carmona; Venezuela	30:38.74
Half marathon	Alfredo Bolívar; Mexico	1:13:26	Óscar González; Venezuela	1:13:42	Jahir Mosquera; Colombia	1:13:59
110 metres hurdles (wind: +1.8 m/s)	Jacinto Álvarez; Cuba	13.83	Ángel Bueno; Cuba	14.01	Modesto Castillo; Dominican Republic	14.06
400 metres hurdles	Winthrop Graham; Jamaica	49.58 CR	Francisco Moret; Cuba	50.45	Antonio Smith; Venezuela	50.94
3000 metres steeplechase	Juan Ramón Conde; Cuba	8:42.38	Diosdaro Martos; Cuba	9:03.90	José Bolivar; Venezuela	9:19.46
4 × 100 metres relay	Jamaica; Gregory Meghoo; Mark Senior; Clive Wright; John Mair	39.45	Panama; Florencio Aguilar; Hector Daley; Alfonso Pitters; Luis Smith	40.48	Dominican Republic; Modesto Castillo; Juan Núñez; Rafael Mejía; Osvaldo Aquino	40.65
4 × 400 metres relay	Jamaica; Winthrop Graham; Devon Morris; Mark Senior; Berris Long	3:03.54	Venezuela; Aaron Phillips; Rafael Díaz; Charles Boddington; Jesús Malavé	3:05.15	Cuba; Agustín Pavó; José Isaac; Raúl Mesa; Francisco Moret	3:07.17
20 km road walk	Carlos Ramones; Venezuela	1:34:34	Francisco Vargas; Colombia	1:34:34	Nicolás Soto; Puerto Rico	1:41:14
High jump	Clarence Saunders; Bermuda	2.26	Francisco Centelles; Cuba	2.20	Bárbaro Díaz; Cuba	2.20
Pole vault	Miguel Saldarriaga; Colombia	5.05	Brent Vanderpool; Bahamas	4.75	Liston Boschette; Puerto Rico	4.75
Long jump	Ray Quiñones; Puerto Rico	8.01	Ubaldo Duany; Cuba	8.00	Miguel Valle; Cuba	7.92
Triple jump	Héctor Marquetti; Cuba	16.91	Norbert Elliott; Bahamas	16.40	Steve Hanna; Bahamas	16.32
Shot put	Marciso Boué; Cuba	18.15	Pedro Contreras; Cuba	17.30	Samuel Crespo; Puerto Rico	16.46
Discus throw	Roberto Moya; Cuba	60.10	Samuel Crespo; Puerto Rico	48.00	Luis Palacios; Venezuela	46.78
Hammer throw	Vicente Sánchez; Cuba	69.86 CR	Eladio Hernández; Cuba	64.44	Edmundo Castillo; Venezuela	56.50
Javelin throw (Current design)	Luis Lucumí; Colombia	72.46 CR	Orlando Hernández; Cuba	71.20	Héctor Duharte; Cuba	70.84
Decathlon	Miguel Valle; Cuba	7586 CR	Ernesto Betancourt; Cuba	7534	Rubén Herrada; Venezuela	6734

=== Women's events ===
Event	Gold		Silver		Bronze	
100 metres (wind: -1.5 m/s)	Amparo Caicedo; Colombia	11.75	Alejandra Flores; Mexico	12.01	Rosa García; Mexico	12.26
200 metres (wind: -0.6 m/s)	Ester Petitón; Cuba	23.67	Amparo Caicedo; Colombia	24.07	Yolande Straughn; Barbados	24.17
400 metres	Norfalia Carabalí; Colombia	51.70	Cathy Rattray; Jamaica	51.83	Ester Petitón; Cuba	53.99
800 metres	Angelita Lind; Puerto Rico	2:04.87	Cathy Rattray; Jamaica	2:05.85	Norfalia Carabalí; Colombia	2:07.67
1500 metres	Milagro Rodríguez; Cuba	4:29.34	Angelita Lind; Puerto Rico	4:29.51	Fabiola Rueda; Colombia	4:34.89
3000 metres	Milagro Rodríguez; Cuba	9:58.86	Yolanda González; Mexico	9:59.05	Fabiola Rueda; Colombia	9:59.13
10,000 metres	Isabel Juárez; Mexico	35:06.20 CR	Fanny Romero; Colombia	36:09.40	Emperatriz Wilson; Cuba	37:07.20
100 metres hurdles	Sandra Taváres; Mexico	13.49 CR	María Torreblanca; Cuba	13.63	Mary Hawkins; Panama	13.82
400 metres hurdles	Belkis Chávez; Cuba	58.82	Carmen Rodríguez; Venezuela	64.24	Rosa Urbina; Venezuela	64.64
4 × 100 metres relay	Colombia; Amparo Caicedo; Norfalia Carabalí; Olga Escalante; Elia Mera	45.29	Mexico; Alejandra Flores; Rosa García; Sandra Taváres; Alma Vázquez	46.25	Cuba; Niurka Montalvo; Ester Petitón; Luisa Peña; María Torreblanca	47.01
4 × 400 metres relay	Cuba; Ester Petitón; Milagros Rodríguez; Luisa Peña; Belkis Chávez	3:27.23 CR	Barbados; Yolande Straughn; Deborah Ross; Jacqueline Hinds; Yvette Wickham	3:40.35	Puerto Rico; Angelita Lind; Dagmar Rosado; Walesica Ramos; Roxanne Oliver	3:41.82
High jump	Mazel Thomas; Jamaica	1.81	María del Carmen García; Cuba	1.81	Victoria Despaigne; Cuba	1.78
Long jump	Niurka Montalvo; Cuba	6.31	Madeline de Jesús; Puerto Rico	6.11	Mazel Thomas; Jamaica	5.98
Shot put	Lissete Martínez; Cuba	17.22	Jenny Quintero; Venezuela	13.94	Marlene Lewis; Jamaica	13.61
Discus throw	Bárbara Hechevarría; Cuba	54.94	Rita Álvarez; Cuba	54.10	María Isabel Urrutia; Colombia	52.60
Javelin throw	Herminia Bouza; Cuba	62.78	Marieta Riera; Venezuela	55.14	Mariela Riera; Venezuela	50.34
Heptathlon	Victoria Despaigne; Cuba	5514 CR	Laiza Carrillo; Cuba	5130	Daisy Ocasio; Puerto Rico	4879

== Medal table ==
* Host nation (Venezuela)

Rank	Nation	Gold	Silver	Bronze	Total
1	Cuba (CUB)	18	15	8	41
2	Colombia (COL)	5	5	5	15
3	Mexico (MEX)	5	3	1	9
4	Jamaica (JAM)	5	2	6	13
5	Venezuela (VEN)*	2	6	8	16
6	Puerto Rico (PUR)	2	4	6	12
7	Dominican Republic (DOM)	1	1	2	4
8	Barbados (BAR)	1	1	1	3
9	Bermuda (BER)	1	0	0	1
10	Bahamas (BAH)	0	2	1	3
11	Panama (PAN)	0	1	1	2
12	Trinidad and Tobago (TTO)	0	0	1	1
Totals (12 entries)		40	40	40	120

== See also ==
- 1987 in athletics (track and field)
