= Alma Vázquez =

Mexican hurdler

Personal information
- Born: 9 August 1963 (age 62) Chilpancingo, Guerrero, Mexico
- Height: 1.65 m (5 ft 5 in)
- Weight: 52 kg (115 lb)

Sport
- Sport: Track and field
- Event: 400 metres hurdles
Medal record
Representing Mexico
Central American and Caribbean Games
Bronze medal – third place	1986 Santiago	400m hurdles
Bronze medal – third place	1986 Santiago	4x100m relay
Bronze medal – third place	1990 Mexico City	4x100m relay

Alma Delia Vázquez Acosta (born 9 August 1963) is a Mexican hurdler. She competed in the women's 400 metres hurdles at the 1984 Summer Olympics.

== International competitions ==
Year	Competition	Venue	Position	Event	Notes
Representing Mexico
1978	Central American and Caribbean; Junior Championships (U17)	Xalapa, Mexico	7th	100 m	12.83
1978	Central American and Caribbean; Junior Championships (U17)	Xalapa, Mexico	5th	200 m	26.03
1978	Central American and Caribbean; Junior Championships (U17)	Xalapa, Mexico	3rd	4 × 100 m relay	49.85
1979	Universiade	Mexico City, Mexico	19th (h)	100 m	12.21
1979	Universiade	Mexico City, Mexico	17th (h)	200 m	25.15
1979	Universiade	Mexico City, Mexico	9th (h)	4 × 100 m relay	47.42
1980	Central American and Caribbean; Junior Championships (U20)	Nassau, Bahamas	3rd	100 m	12.3
1980	Central American and Caribbean; Junior Championships (U20)	Nassau, Bahamas	3rd	200 m	25.5
1980	Central American and Caribbean; Junior Championships (U20)	Nassau, Bahamas	4th	400 m	56.7
1982	Central American and Caribbean Games	Havana, Cuba	6th	400 m	61.17
1982	Central American and Caribbean Games	Havana, Cuba	7th	4 × 100 m relay	47.41
1982	Central American and Caribbean Games	Havana, Cuba	7th	4 × 400 m relay	3:58.91
1983	Central American and Caribbean Championships	Havana, Cuba	1st	400 m hurdles	59.57
1983	Pan American Games	Caracas, Venezuela	6th	200 m	24.32
1983	Pan American Games	Caracas, Venezuela	5th	400 m hurdles	58.12
1983	Ibero-American Championships	Barcelona, Spain	3rd	400 m hurdles	61.90
1984	Olympic Games	Los Angeles, United States	23rd (h)	400 m hurdles	60.86
1985	Central American and Caribbean Championships	Nassau, Bahamas	2nd	4 × 100 m relay	46.04
1985	Central American and Caribbean Championships	Nassau, Bahamas	2nd	4 × 400 m relay	3:40.75
1986	Central American and Caribbean Games	Santiago, Dominican Republic	3rd	400 m hurdles	59.05
1986	Central American and Caribbean Games	Santiago, Dominican Republic	3rd	4 × 100 m relay	45.58
1986	Central American and Caribbean Games	Santiago, Dominican Republic	4th	4 × 400 m relay	3:52.98
1986	Ibero-American Championships	Havana, Cuba	1st	100 m	11.76
1986	Ibero-American Championships	Havana, Cuba	–	400 m hurdles	DNF
1986	Ibero-American Championships	Havana, Cuba	1st	4 × 100 m relay	45.95
1986	Ibero-American Championships	Havana, Cuba	3rd	4 × 400 m relay	3:44.71
1987	Central American and Caribbean Championships	Caracas, Venezuela	2nd	4 × 100 m relay	46.25
1987	Pan American Games	Indianapolis, United States	5th	4 × 100 m relay	46.29
1988	Ibero-American Championships	Mexico City, Mexico	7th	100 m	11.82
1988	Ibero-American Championships	Mexico City, Mexico	6th	400 m hurdles	60.11
1988	Ibero-American Championships	Mexico City, Mexico	2nd	4 × 100 m relay	45.20
1990	Central American and Caribbean Games	Mexico City, Mexico	5th	100 m	11.92
1990	Central American and Caribbean Games	Mexico City, Mexico	4th	200 m	24.47
1990	Central American and Caribbean Games	Mexico City, Mexico	3rd	4 × 100 m relay	45.75
1991	Central American and Caribbean Championships	Xalapa, Mexico	3rd	200 m	25.08
1991	Central American and Caribbean Championships	Xalapa, Mexico	2nd	4 × 100 m relay	46.57

== Personal bests ==
Outdoor

- 400 metres hurdles – 58.12 (1983)
