= Narciso Boué =

Cuban shot putter

Personal information
- Full name: Narciso Boué García
- Born: 28 November 1962
- Height: 1.88 m (6 ft 2 in)
- Weight: 105 kg (231 lb)

Sport
- Sport: Athletics
- Event: Shot put

Narciso Boué García (born 28 November 1962) is a retired Cuban athlete who specialised in the shot put. He won several medals at regional level. He later worked as an athletics coach in Mexico.

His personal best in the event is 19.42 metres set in Verona in 1987.

== International competitions ==
Year	Competition	Venue	Position	Event	Notes
Representing Cuba
1983	Central American and Caribbean Championships	Havana, Cuba	3rd	Shot put	15.90 m
1986	Central American and Caribbean Games	Santiago, Dominican Republic	2nd	Shot put	18.59 m
1986	Ibero-American Championships	Havana, Cuba	4th	Shot put	17.61 m
1987	Central American and Caribbean Championships	Caracas, Venezuela	1st	Shot put	18.15 m
1988	Ibero-American Championships	Mexico City, Mexico	2nd	Shot put	18.98 m
1990	Central American and Caribbean Games	Mexico City, Mexico	2nd	Shot put	18.26 m
