= Claudio Cabán =

Puerto Rican marathon runner

Claudio Cabán (born August 25, 1963) is a retired Puerto Rican marathon runner. He competed for his native country in the men's marathon at the 1984 Summer Olympics, finishing in 53rd place. He set his personal best in the classic distance (2:20.45) in 1983.

== Achievements ==
Year	Competition	Venue	Position	Event	Notes
Representing Puerto Rico
1984	Olympic Games	Los Angeles, United States	53rd	Marathon	2:27:16
1985	Central American and Caribbean Championships	Nassau, Bahamas	1st	Marathon	2:27:16
