= Ernesto Betancourt =

Cuban decathlete (born 1963)

Ernesto Betancourt Ramírez (born 5 November 1963) is a retired Cuban decathlete.

He won the gold medal at the 1986 Central American and Caribbean Games, the silver medal at the 1987 Central American and Caribbean Championships, and the silver medal at the 1990 Central American and Caribbean Games. He also became Cuban champion.
