= Ali St. Louis =

Trinidad and Tobago sprinter

Ali St. Louis (May 13, 1959 – September 25, 2011) was an athlete from Trinidad and Tobago who specialized in the 200 and 400 metres.

At the 1982 Central American and Caribbean Games he won a bronze medal in the 4 × 400 m relay, and at the 1986 Central American and Caribbean Games he won a silver medal in the 4 × 400 m relay, and finished eighth in the 200 metres. He competed at the 1984 Olympics.

He competed collegiately for the Abilene Christian Wildcats, and was a high-level coach in his later life. He died in 2011 in a car crash near his home in D'Abadie.
