= Henrico Atkins =

Barbadian sprinter (born 1966)

Personal information
- Born: 8 September 1966 (age 59)

Sport
- Sport: Track and field
Medal record
Representing Barbados
Central American and Caribbean Games
Bronze medal – third place	1986 Santiago de los Caballeros	4x400m relay

Henrico O. Atkins (born 8 September 1966) is a former Barbadian sprinter who competed in the men's 100m competition at the 1992 Summer Olympics. He recorded a 10.83, not enough to qualify for the next round past the heats. His personal best is 10.46, set in 1991. He also ran in the 200m in 1992, finishing with a 21.28, enough to advance to the next round, where a 21.19 was not enough to go further. In 1988, he also competed in both disciplines, but did not advance past either heat.
