= Ruth Morris (athlete) =

United States Virgin Islands sprinter

Personal information
- Nationality: American Virgin Islander
- Born: October 7, 1966 (age 59)
- Height: 1.70 m (5 ft 7 in)
- Weight: 64 kg (141 lb)

Sport
- Sport: Sprinting
- Event: 200 metres

Ruth Leona Morris (born October 7, 1966) is a sprinter who represents the United States Virgin Islands. She competed in the 200 metres at the 1988 Summer Olympics and the 1992 Summer Olympics.
