= Jimmy Flemming =

American sprinter

Personal information
- Nationality: American Virgin Islander
- Born: September 14, 1966 (age 59)
- Height: 1.80 m (5 ft 11 in)
- Weight: 76 kg (168 lb)

Sport
- Sport: Sprinting
- Event: 100 metres

James "Jimmy" Flemming (born September 14, 1966) is a retired sprinter who represented the United States Virgin Islands. He competed in the men's 100 metres at the 1988 Summer Olympics.
