= Juan Núñez (athlete) =

Dominican Republic sprinter (born 1959)

Juan Núñez Lima (born September 19, 1959) is a retired Dominican athlete who competed in the sprints. He competed at the World Championships in Helsinki in 1983 in the 100 meters where he reached the final and finished 5th.

== Anti-doping rule violation ==
At the 1983 Pan American Games Núñez was disqualified after testing positive for the stimulant Fencamfamine.

== International competitions ==
Representing Dominican Republic
Year	Competition	Venue	Position	Event	Result	Notes
1981	Central American and Caribbean Championships	Santo Domingo, DR	3rd	100 metres		
1981	Central American and Caribbean Championships	Santo Domingo, DR	1st	200 metres		
1982	Central American and Caribbean Games	Havana, Cuba	3rd	100 metres		
1982	Central American and Caribbean Games	Havana, Cuba	3rd	200 metres		
1983	Central American and Caribbean Championships	Havana, Cuba	1st	100 metres		
1983	Central American and Caribbean Championships	Havana, Cuba	1st	200 metres		
1983	Pan American Games	Caracas, Venezuela	DSQ (2nd)	100 metres		
1986	Central American and Caribbean Games	Santiago de los Caballeros, DR	2nd	100 metres		
1986	Central American and Caribbean Games	Santiago de los Caballeros, DR	2nd	200 metres		
1987	Central American and Caribbean Championships	Caracas, Venezuela	1st	100 metres		
1987	Central American and Caribbean Championships	Caracas, Venezuela	2nd	200 metres		
1987	Pan American Games	Indianapolis, United States	3rd	100 metres		

Olympic Games
Preceded by Pedro Nolasco	Flagbearer for Dominican Republic; Seoul 1988	Succeeded by Altagracia Contreras
