= Soraima Martha =

Dutch Antillean athlete

Personal information
- Nationality: Dutch Antillean
- Born: 10 January 1967 (age 58) Willemstad, Netherlands Antilles
- Height: 1.68 m (5 ft 6 in)
- Weight: 58 kg (128 lb)

Sport
- Sport: Sprinting
- Event: 200 metres

Soraima Martha (born 10 January 1967) is a sprinter who represented the Netherlands Antilles. She competed in the women's 200 metres at the 1984 Summer Olympics.
