= Dudley Parker =

Bahamian sprinter

Personal information
- Nationality: Bahamian
- Born: 5 May 1962 (age 64)

Sport
- Sport: Sprinting
- Event: 100 metres

Dudley Parker (born 5 May 1962) is a Bahamian sprinter. He competed in the men's 100 metres at the 1984 Summer Olympics.
