= Gerardo Alcalá =

Mexican long-distance runner

Personal information
- Full name: Gerardo Agustín Alcalá García
- Nationality: Mexican
- Born: 28 June 1961 (age 64)

Sport
- Sport: Track and field
Medal record
Representing Mexico
Pan American Games
Silver medal – second place	1983 Caracas	5000m
Central American and Caribbean Games
Silver medal – second place	1986 Santiago	10,000m
Bronze medal – third place	1982 Havana	10,000m

Gerardo Agustín Alcalá García (born 28 June 1961) is a Mexican former long-distance runner.

In the 5000 metres he won the silver medal at the 1983 Pan American Games. He also competed at the 1984 Olympic Games without reaching the final.

In the 10,000 metres he won the bronze medal at the 1982 Central American and Caribbean Games and the silver medal at the 1986 Central American and Caribbean Games. He later finished fourth at the 1990 Goodwill Games in 27:43.07 minutes. This was his personal best time. At the 1983 Central American and Caribbean Championships he won both the 5000 and 10,000 metres.

His personal best time in the 5000 metres was 13:29.49 minutes, achieved in August 1990 in Brussels. His personal best in the marathon was 2:12:11 hours, achieved when he finished seventh at the 1988 Chicago Marathon.
