= Rubén Camino =

Cuban pole vaulter (born 1959)

Personal information
- Born: 26 April 1959 (age 67)

Sport
- Sport: Track and field

Rubén Marcelino Camino Herrera (born 26 April 1959) is a retired Cuban pole vaulter.

Highly successful on the regional scene, he won the bronze medal at the 1978 Central American and Caribbean Games, then a string of gold medals at the 1979 and 1981 Central American and Caribbean Championships and the 1982 Central American and Caribbean Games. Following a bronze at the 1983 Central American and Caribbean Championships he again won the 1985 Central American and Caribbean Championships and the 1986 Central American and Caribbean Games, took the bronze medal at the 1986 Ibero-American Championships and the silver medal at the 1987 Pan American Games. He also represented the Americas at the 1981 IAAF World Cup, finishing seventh.

His personal best jump was 5.50 metres, achieved at the 1987 Pan American Games in Indianapolis.
