= Elvis Forde =

Barbadian sprinter (born 1959)

Personal information
- Born: 18 November 1959 (age 66)

Sport
- Sport: Track and field
Medal record
Representing Barbados
Central American and Caribbean Games
Bronze medal – third place	1986 Santiago	400m
Bronze medal – third place	1986 Santiago	4x400m relay

Elvis Forde (born 18 November 1959) is a retired Barbadian sprinter who specialized in the 400 metres.

== Biography ==
=== Early life and career ===
Forde was born on November 18, 1959 in Barbados. He married Beverley and they have two children, Chante' and Kevin. Forde owns a Bachelor of Science degree in physical education from Southern Illinois University (1986) and a Master of Science degree in athletic administration from Austin Peay State (1994).

He was the flag bearer for his native country at the opening ceremony of the 1988 Summer Olympics.

He won the bronze medals at the 1985 Central American and Caribbean Championships and the 1986 Central American and Caribbean Games, and the gold medal at the 1987 Central American and Caribbean Championships.

At the 1984 Olympic Games he finished sixth in the 4 x 400 metres relay, together with teammates Richard Louis, David Peltier and Clyde Edwards. Their time of 3:01.60 minutes is still the Barbadian record. Forde also competed in the individual distance at the 1984 Olympics. Here, he achieved his career best time of 45.32 seconds. He also competed at the 1987 World Indoor Championships and the 1988 Olympic Games.

Indoor, he was a two-time winner of the 600-yard dash at the USA Indoor Track and Field Championships, the last two times the event was held before being converted into the 500 metres.

He is the former head track and field coach at Illinois State University in Bloomington-Normal, Illinois and previously Austin Peay State University in Clarksville, TN. Forde is now the head men and women's cross-country and women's track & field coach at Temple University in Philadelphia, Pennsylvania.
