= Vicente Sánchez (athlete) =

Cuban hammer thrower

Vicente Sánchez (born 22 January 1966) is a retired Cuban hammer thrower.

He won the silver medal at the 1983 Central American and Caribbean Championships, the gold medal at the 1986 Central American and Caribbean Games, finished fourth at the 1986 Ibero-American Championships, won the gold medal at the 1987 Central American and Caribbean Championships, the bronze medal at the 1987 Pan American Games and the silver medal at the 1988 Ibero-American Championships. He also became Cuban champion.
