= Leroy Reid =

Jamaican sprinter

Personal information
- Nationality: Jamaican
- Born: 3 August 1963 (age 63)

Sport
- Sport: Sprinting
- Event: 200 metres

Leroy Reid (born 3 August 1963) is a Jamaican sprinter. He competed in the men's 200 metres at the 1984 Summer Olympics.

Competing for the TCU Horned Frogs track and field team, Reid won the 1986 NCAA Division I Outdoor Track and Field Championships in the 4 × 100 m.

Reid transferred to Texas Christian University from the University of Florida. He ran the second-leg curve on the school's 4 × 100 m team and specialized in the 200 metres individually.

== International competitions ==
Year	Competition	Venue	Position	Event	Time	Notes
1983	World Championships	(Finland) Helsinki	7th (sf)	200 m	20.89	wind +3.4
