= Laura Agront =

Puerto Rican high jumper

Personal information
- Born: March 14, 1965 (age 61) Aguada, Puerto Rico
Medal record
Women's Athletics
Representing Puerto Rico
Central American and Caribbean Games
Bronze medal – third place	1986 Santiago	High Jump
CAC Junior Championships (U20)
Gold medal – first place	1984 San Juan	High jump

Laura Agront Sánchez-Pimion (born March 14, 1965) is a retired female high jumper from Puerto Rico. She competed for her native country at the 1984 Summer Olympics in Los Angeles, California, finishing in 22nd place in the final rankings with a jump of 1.80 m.

== Achievements ==
Year	Competition	Venue	Position	Event	Notes
Representing Puerto Rico
1984	Central American and Caribbean Junior Championships (U-20)	San Juan, Puerto Rico	1st	High jump	1.73 m
1984	Olympic Games	Los Angeles, United States	22nd	High jump	1.80 m
