= Luis Morales (sprinter) =

Puerto Rican sprinter (born 1964)

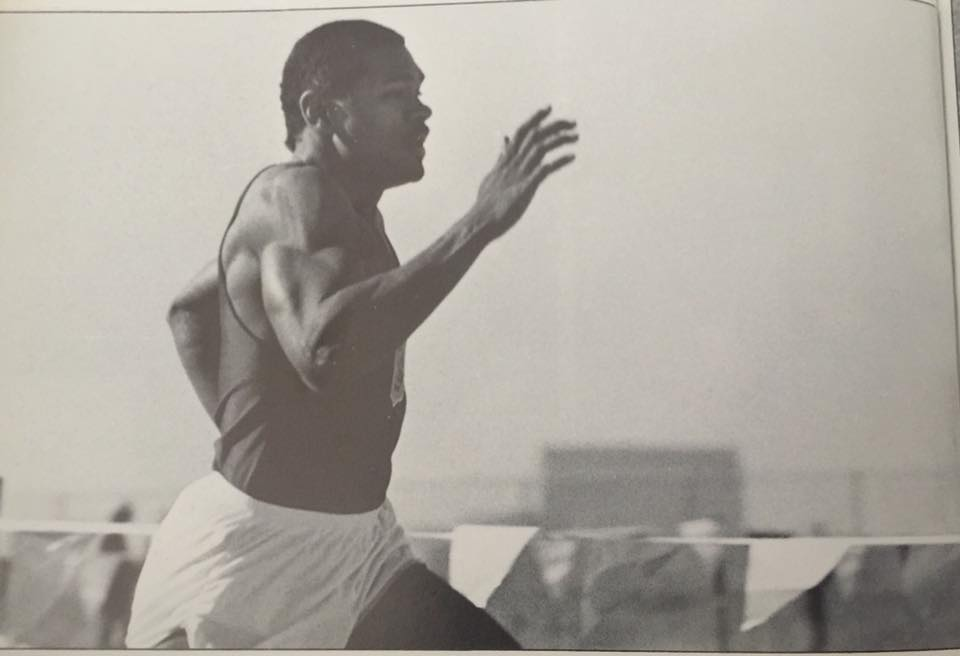
Luis Morales Sprinting

Luis “Pancho” Morales (born March 4, 1964) is a retired Puerto Rican sprinter who specialized in the 100 and 200 metres. Luis Morales held the National Puerto Rican record in the 100m for 40 years from 1983 until 2023. Currently Luis Morales is the National Puerto Rican record holder in the 200m since 1987 (Record Time of 20.44).

He competed in both 100 and 200 metres at the 1984 Olympic Games, and reached the semi-final in both events. He won the silver medal in the 100 metres at the 1987 Central American and Caribbean Championships.

His personal best time in the 100 metres was 10.21 seconds, achieved in May 1983 in Modesto, California. His personal best time in the 200 metres was 20.44 seconds, achieved in May 1987 in Corvallis.

Luis “Pancho” Morales was one of the top All American sprinter at USC. Former PAC 10 Champion in the 100m and 200m. Also was All American in the NCAA indoor 55m in 6.19. Currently He is still one of Top 25 sprinters at USC All Time List in the 100m and 200m. His 55m is time of 6.19 is still USC indoor record. Luis " Pancho" Morales is also the current Puerto Rican 55m record holder of 6.17 he ran at the Sunkist Invitation on Feb 21,1986 in Inglewood, Ca.

Luis Morales ran for USC between 1982 - 1987. Won the Pac 10 titles in the 100m and 200m while attending USC. Personal Best in the 100 meters is 10.21 which he ran while competing for USC May 14, 1983. This time of 10.21 was run at the Modesto Invitational in Modesto, Ca. Luis Morales 10.21 in the 100 meters was run at sea level and it became the Puerto Rico National record. Luis Morales is still currently the Puerto Rico National record holder in the 100 meters because his time of 10.21 was run at sea level. Miguel Lopez in 2012 ran 10.21 in Cochabamba, Bolivia which is a city located in Altitude of over 8,000 feet (2,400 meters) above sea level. Only sea level times or altitude times converted to sea level are considered for record purposes according to the IAAF rules. The IAAF is that govern body of track and field. Luis Morales 200 meter time of 20.44 is still currently the Puerto Rico National record and has been since 1987.

== See also ==
- Puerto Rican records in track and field
