= Mauricio González (runner) =

Mexican long-distance runner (born 1960)

Personal information
- Born: October 16, 1960 (age 65)
- Height: 1.80 m (5 ft 11 in)
- Weight: 67 kg (148 lb)
Medal record
Men's Athletics
Representing Mexico
Central American and Caribbean Games
Gold medal – first place	1986 Santiago	5000 m

Mauricio González (born October 16, 1960) is a Mexican retired long-distance runner. He won the gold medal in the men's 5000 metres event at the 1986 Central American and Caribbean Games, and competed for his native country at the 1988 Summer Olympics in Seoul, South Korea. Mexican record holder 5000m and 10000m 1985–1988. Fourth place Final Grand Prix 5000m Rome Italy.

González was married to Poland's long-distance runner Wanda Panfil.

== Personal bests ==
- 5,000 metres — 13.22.4 (1985)
- 10,000 metres — 27.43.64 (1988)
