= Allan Ingraham =

Bahamian sprinter

Personal information
- Nationality: Bahamian
- Born: 7 March 1962 (age 64)
- Height: 1.83 m (6 ft 0 in)
- Weight: 73 kg (161 lb)

Sport
- Sport: Sprinting
- Event: 400 metres

Allan Ingraham (also spelled Allen; born 7 March 1962) is a Bahamian sprinter. He competed in the men's 400 metres at the 1984 Summer Olympics.

During his 1981 spring break, Ingraham ran 46.2 seconds to anchor the Bahamian national team to a 4 × 400 m international victory. He was described as a hero in his home country, with fans chanting 'In-gra-ham' during the meet.

Ingraham was an NCAA Division I national champion sprinter for the TCU Horned Frogs track and field team, leading off their winning 4 × 400 meter relay team at the 1983 NCAA Division I Outdoor Track and Field Championships. He broke the Bahamian record in the 400 metres, running 45.26 before the 1984 Games.

He would later convince his college coach Bubba Thornton to travel to Nassau, Bahamas to scout athletes at the CARIFTA Games.
