= Greg Rolle =

Bahamian athlete

Personal information
- Nationality: Bahamian
- Born: Gregory Rolle; 14 October 1959 (age 66)
- Height: 1.88 m (6 ft 2 in)
- Weight: 79 kg (174 lb)

Sport
- Country: Bahamas
- Sport: Athletics
Medal record
Men's Athletics
Commonwealth Games
Bronze medal – third place	1982 Brisbane	400m hurdles

Gregory Rolle (born 14 October 1959) is a former Bahamian athlete.

Rolle was a semi-finalist in the 400 metres hurdles at the 1984 Summer Olympics. He also won a bronze medal in the same event at the 1982 Commonwealth Games and was eighth at the 1987 Pan American Games.

His personal best of 49.46, set in Los Angeles in 1983, remained a national record for 30 years.

He now works as a director for the Bahamas Ministry of Tourism.
