= Debbie Greene =

Bahamian sprinter

Personal information
- Nationality: Bahamian
- Born: 24 February 1962 (age 64)

Sport
- Sport: Sprinting
- Event: 4 × 100 metres relay

Debbie Greene (born 24 February 1962) is a Bahamian sprinter. She competed in the women's 4 × 100 metres relay at the 1984 Summer Olympics.
