= Oslen Barr =

Guyanese middle-distance runner

Oslen Barr (born 3 April 1961) is a Guyanese former middle distance runner who competed in the 1984 Summer Olympics and in the 1988 Summer Olympics.
