= Fabian Whymns =

Bahamian sprinter

Personal information
- Nationality: Bahamian
- Born: 11 June 1961 (age 65) Nassau, Bahamas
- Height: 1.73 m (5 ft 8 in)
- Weight: 68 kg (150 lb)

Sport
- Sport: Sprinting
- Event: 100 metres

Fabian Whymns (born 11 June 1961) is a Bahamian sprinter. He competed in the men's 100 metres at the 1988 Summer Olympics.

Whymns was a California Community College Athletic Association champion over 100 m and 200 m for the Long Beach City Vikings track and field team. He transferred to the UTEP Miners track and field team in 1981 with personal bests of 10.3 and 20.8 for 100 m and 200 m respectively.

At only 5 ft 7 in (1.70 m) tall, Whymns was said to make up for a height disadvantage with speed and acceleration. He derived motivation from racing against Carl Lewis and Herschel Walker. Despite dealing with leg injuries, Whymns was an All-American for the Miners, finishing 5th in the 55 metres at the 1982 NCAA Indoor Track and Field Championships.
