= Ernesto Torres =

Puerto Rican triple jumper (born 1959)

Personal information
- Full name: Ernesto Torres Ruiz
- Nationality: Puerto Rican
- Born: 12 December 1959 (age 66)
- Height: 1.75 m (5 ft 9 in)
- Weight: 62 kg (137 lb)

Sport
- Sport: Athletics
- Event: Triple jump

Ernesto Torres Ruiz (born 26 December 1959) is a Puerto Rican athlete. He competed in the men's triple jump at the 1988 Summer Olympics.

His personal best in the event is 16.84 metres set in 1988.
