= Athletics at the 1982 Commonwealth Games – Women's 200 metres =

Women's 200 metres at the Commonwealth Games

The women's 200 metres event at the 1982 Commonwealth Games was held on 5 and 7 October at the QE II Stadium in Brisbane, Australia.

== Medalists ==
Gold	Silver	Bronze
Merlene Ottey; Jamaica	Kathy Smallwood; England	Angella Taylor; Canada

== Results ==
=== Heats ===
Qualification: First 4 in each heat (Q) and the next 2 fastest (q) qualify for the semifinals.

Wind:
Heat 1: -2.2 m/s, Heat 2: -1.1 m/s, Heat 3: +0.3 m/s, Heat 4: ? m/s

Rank	Heat	Name	Nationality	Time	Notes
1	1	Kathy Smallwood	England	23.48	Q
2	4	Merlene Ottey	Jamaica	23.73	Q
3	1	Colleen Pekin	Australia	23.80	Q
4	2	Angella Taylor	Canada	23.82	Q
5	3	Denise Boyd	Australia	23.89	Q
6	4	Beverley Callender	England	24.05	Q
7	2	Grace Jackson	Jamaica	24.08	Q
8	3	Helen Barnett	England	24.10	Q
9	2	Jenny Flaherty	Australia	24.25	Q
10	4	Sandra Whittaker	Scotland	24.28	Q
11	3	Rufina Ubah	Nigeria	24.31	Q
12	4	Nzaeli Kyomo	Tanzania	24.33	Q
13	1	Molly Killingbeck	Canada	24.34	Q
14	2	Carmen Smart	Wales	24.35	Q
15	4	Maxine McMillan	Trinidad and Tobago	24.45	q
16	1	Elizabeth Mokogwu	Nigeria	24.48	Q
17	2	Tutu Ogunde	Nigeria	24.57	q
18	1	Joyce Odhiambo	Kenya	24.67	
19	3	Angela Bailey	Canada	24.73	Q
20	2	Angela Williams	Trinidad and Tobago	24.74	
21	1	Mary Afriyie-Mensah	Ghana	24.80	
22	2	Grace Armah	Ghana	25.01	
23	4	Ruth Waithera	Kenya	25.13	
24	1	Jabou Jawo	Gambia	25.30	
25	3	Alice Adala	Kenya	25.41	
26	2	Angela Owen	Isle of Man	25.61	
27	4	Elanga Buala	Papua New Guinea	25.69	
28	3	Amie Ndow	Gambia	25.85	
29	3	Mary-Estelle Kapalu	Vanuatu	27.64	
	1	Michelle Scutt	Wales	DNS	
	3	Mercy Addy	Ghana	DNS	
	3	Kim Robertson	New Zealand	DNS	

=== Semifinals ===
Qualification: First 4 in each semifinal (Q) and the next 1 fastest (q) qualify for the final.

Wind:
Heat 1: -3.9 m/s, Heat 2: -2.4 m/s

Rank	Heat	Name	Nationality	Time	Notes
1	2	Merlene Ottey	Jamaica	22.70	Q
2	2	Beverley Callender	England	23.02	Q
3	2	Denise Boyd	Australia	23.10	Q
4	2	Angela Bailey	Canada	23.44	Q
5	1	Kathy Smallwood	England	23.45	Q
6	1	Colleen Pekin	Australia	23.53	Q
7	1	Angella Taylor	Canada	23.55	Q
8	2	Helen Barnett	England	23.63	q
9	1	Grace Jackson	Jamaica	23.66	Q
10	2	Carmen Smart	Wales	23.91	
11	1	Jenny Flaherty	Australia	23.93	
12	2	Molly Killingbeck	Canada	24.16	
13	1	Rufina Ubah	Nigeria	24.20	
14	1	Sandra Whittaker	Scotland	24.22	
15	2	Nzaeli Kyomo	Tanzania	24.24	
16	2	Elizabeth Mokogwu	Nigeria	24.39	
17	1	Maxine McMillan	Trinidad and Tobago	24.40	
18	1	Tutu Ogunde	Nigeria	24.60	

=== Final ===
Wind: +2.5 m/s

Rank	Lane	Name	Nationality	Time	Notes
1st place, gold medalist(s)	9	Merlene Ottey	Jamaica	22.19	
2nd place, silver medalist(s)	6	Kathy Smallwood	England	22.21	
3rd place, bronze medalist(s)	2	Angella Taylor	Canada	22.48	
4	8	Denise Boyd	Australia	22.72	
5	4	Colleen Pekin	Australia	22.89	
6	3	Beverley Callender	England	22.92	
7	5	Grace Jackson	Jamaica	23.25	
8	1	Angela Bailey	Canada	23.42	
9	7	Helen Barnett	England	23.57	
