= Athletics at the 1978 Commonwealth Games – Women's 200 metres =

Women's 200 metres at the Commonwealth Games

The women's 200 metres event at the 1978 Commonwealth Games was held on 8 and 10 August at the Commonwealth Stadium in Edmonton, Alberta, Canada.

== Medalists ==
Gold	Silver	Bronze
Denise Boyd; Australia	Sonia Lannaman; England	Colleen Beazley; Australia

== Results ==
=== Heats ===
Held on 8 August

Qualification: First 3 in each heat (Q) and the next 1 fastest (q) qualify for the semifinals.

Wind:
Heat 1: +3.3 m/s, Heat 2: ? m/s, Heat 3: +2.7 m/s, Heat 4: +5.5 m/s, Heat 5: ? m/s

Rank	Heat	Name	Nationality	Time	Notes
1	2	Kathy Smallwood	England	22.73	Q
2	2	June Griffith	Guyana	23.02	Q
3	1	Denise Boyd	Australia	23.03	Q
4	4	Helen Golden	Scotland	23.17	Q
5	3	Hannah Afriye	Ghana	23.35	Q
6	4	Sonia Lannaman	England	23.36	Q
7	2	Kim Robertson	New Zealand	23.38	Q
8	1	Patty Loverock	Canada	23.43	Q
9	3	Colleen Beazley	Australia	23.50	Q
10	4	Raelene Boyle	Australia	23.66	Q
11	2	Maureen Gottschalk	Jamaica	23.69	q
12	3	Wendy Brown	New Zealand	23.77	Q
13	1	Margot Wells	Scotland	23.81	Q
13	2	Angella Taylor	Canada	23.81	
15	5	Beverley Goddard	England	23.85	Q
16	5	Ruth Waithera	Kenya	23.88	Q
17	3	Angela Bailey	Canada	23.91	
18	1	Janice Bernard	Trinidad and Tobago	23.96	
19	1	Freida Nicholls	Barbados	24.07	
20	2	Esther Hope	Trinidad and Tobago	24.19	
21	5	Linda McCurry	Northern Ireland	24.24	Q
22	4	Penny Hunt	New Zealand	24.25	
23	1	Esther Otieno	Kenya	24.43	
24	2	Georgiana Freeman	Gambia	24.52	
25	4	Normalee Murray	Jamaica	24.53	
26	5	Nzaeli Kyomo	Tanzania	24.75	
27	4	Candy Ford	Bermuda	24.86	
28	3	Carmeta Drummond	Jamaica	24.94	
29	1	Caroline Delancy	Turks and Caicos Islands	25.02	
30	2	Marie-France Mamedy	Mauritius	25.08	
31	5	Marilyn Bradley	Trinidad and Tobago	25.71	
32	3	Jabou Jawo	Gambia	26.38	
33	4	Joyce John	Sierra Leone	26.44	
34	5	Amie N'Dow	Gambia	26.56	
	3	Donna Burgess	Bermuda	DNF	
	3	Mossy Ally	Tanzania	DNS	
	4	Grace Bakari	Ghana	DNS	
	5	Debbie Jones	Bermuda	DNS	
	5	Fay Nixon	Scotland	DNS	

=== Semifinals ===
Held on 8 August

Qualification: First 4 in each semifinal (Q) qualify directly for the final.

Wind:
Heat 1: ? m/s, Heat 2: +2.1 m/s

Rank	Heat	Name	Nationality	Time	Notes
1	1	Kathy Smallwood	England	22.99	Q
2	2	Denise Boyd	Australia	23.03	Q
3	2	Beverley Goddard	England	23.17	Q
4	2	Helen Golden	Scotland	23.37	Q
5	2	Colleen Beazley	Australia	23.42	Q
6	1	Sonia Lannaman	England	23.43	Q
7	2	June Griffith	Guyana	23.44	
8	1	Patty Loverock	Canada	23.58	Q
9	2	Kim Robertson	New Zealand	23.59	
10	1	Linda McCurry	Northern Ireland	23.62	Q
11	1	Wendy Brown	New Zealand	23.64	
12	2	Ruth Waithera	Kenya	23.93	
13	1	Margot Wells	Scotland	24.29	
14	2	Maureen Gottschalk	Jamaica	24.62	
	1	Hannah Afriye	Ghana	DNS	
	1	Raelene Boyle	Australia	DNS	

=== Final ===
Held on 10 August

Wind: +5.1 m/s

Rank	Lane	Name	Nationality	Time	Notes
1st place, gold medalist(s)	4	Denise Boyd	Australia	22.82	
2nd place, silver medalist(s)	1	Sonia Lannaman	England	22.89	
3rd place, bronze medalist(s)	7	Colleen Beazley	Australia	22.93	
4	6	Beverley Goddard	England	22.95	
5	8	Kathy Smallwood	England	22.96	
6	5	Helen Golden	Scotland	23.28	
7	3	Patty Loverock	Canada	23.47	
8	2	Linda McCurry	Northern Ireland	23.71	
