= Athletics at the 1978 Commonwealth Games – Women's 100 metres =

Women's 100 metres at the Commonwealth Games

The women's 100 metres event at the 1978 Commonwealth Games was held on 6 and 7 August at the Commonwealth Stadium in Edmonton, Alberta, Canada.

== Medalists ==
Gold	Silver	Bronze
Sonia Lannaman; England	Raelene Boyle; Australia	Denise Boyd; Australia

== Results ==
=== Heats ===
Held on 6 August

Qualification: First 3 in each heat (Q) and the next 1 fastest (q) qualify for the semifinals.

Wind:
Heat 1: -2.5 m/s, Heat 2: ? m/s, Heat 3: -1.6 m/s, Heat 4: -0.1 m/s, Heat 5: ? m/s

Rank	Heat	Name	Nationality	Time	Notes
1	3	Beverley Goddard	England	11.51	Q
2	2	Leleith Hodges	Jamaica	11.52	Q
3	4	Raelene Boyle	Australia	11.53	Q
4	3	Patty Loverock	Canada	11.57	Q
5	1	Denise Boyd	Australia	11.58	Q
6	3	Colleen Beazley	Australia	11.60	Q
7	4	Hannah Afriyie	Ghana	11.61	Q
8	4	Debbie Jones	Bermuda	11.66	Q
9	2	Kim Robertson	New Zealand	11.67	Q
10	2	Margot Wells	Scotland	11.69	Q
11	1	Wendy Clarke	England	11.73	Q
12	2	Esther Hope	Trinidad and Tobago	11.74	q
14	1	Marjorie Bailey	Canada	11.75	Q
14	5	Sonia Lannaman	England	11.75	Q
16	4	Janice Bernard	Trinidad and Tobago	11.78	
17	5	Angela Bailey	Canada	11.79	Q
18	5	Helen Golden	Scotland	11.83	Q
19	5	Wendy Brown	New Zealand	11.84	
20	1	Dorothy Scott	Jamaica	11.99	
21	3	June Caddle	Barbados	12.09	
22	3	Jeanette Yawson	Ghana	12.12	
23	4	Esther Otieno	Kenya	12.15	
24	2	Victoria Hancox	Northern Ireland	12.23	
25	3	Carmeta Drummond	Jamaica	12.26	
26	5	Candy Ford	Bermuda	12.29	
27	5	Nzaeli Kyomo	Tanzania	12.35	
28	1	Bernadette Wilson	Bermuda	12.36	
29	1	Joanne Gardner	Trinidad and Tobago	12.36	
30	2	Caroline Delancy	Turks and Caicos Islands	12.37	
31	3	Caroline Briggs	Gambia	12.53	
32	2	Marie-France Mamedy	Mauritius	12.61	
33	1	Georgiana Freeman	Gambia	12.64	
34	5	Marina Chin Leng Sim	Malaysia	12.85	
35	4	Jabou Jawo	Gambia	12.94	
36	1	Teresa David	Mauritius	13.06	
37	4	Joyce John	Sierra Leone	13.12	
	5	Linda McCurry	Northern Ireland	DNS	

=== Semifinals ===
Held on 6 August

Qualification: First 4 in each semifinal (Q) qualify directly for the final.

Wind:
Heat 1: 0.0 m/s, Heat 2: -0.8 m/s

Rank	Heat	Name	Nationality	Time	Notes
1	1	Denise Boyd	Australia	11.37	Q
2	1	Patty Loverock	Canada	11.47	Q
2	2	Raelene Boyle	Australia	11.47	Q
4	1	Sonia Lannaman	England	11.49	Q
5	2	Beverley Goddard	England	11.52	Q
6	1	Wendy Clarke	England	11.56	Q
6	2	Hannah Afriyie	Ghana	11.56	Q
8	2	Leleith Hodges	Jamaica	11.58	Q
9	1	Debbie Jones	Bermuda	11.62	
10	1	Angela Bailey	Canada	11.63	
10	2	Kim Robertson	New Zealand	11.63	
12	2	Colleen Beazley	Australia	11.66	
13	2	Marjorie Bailey	Canada	11.67	
14	2	Helen Golden	Scotland	11.71	
15	1	Margot Wells	Scotland	11.73	
16	1	Esther Hope	Trinidad and Tobago	11.82	

=== Final ===
Held on 7 August

Wind: +2.9 m/s

Rank	Lane	Name	Nationality	Time	Notes
1st place, gold medalist(s)	3	Sonia Lannaman	England	11.27	
2nd place, silver medalist(s)	8	Raelene Boyle	Australia	11.35	
3rd place, bronze medalist(s)	7	Denise Boyd	Australia	11.37	
4	2	Hannah Afriyie	Ghana	11.38	
5	4	Beverley Goddard	England	11.40	
6	6	Patty Loverock	Canada	11.40	
7	5	Leleith Hodges	Jamaica	11.47	
8	1	Wendy Clarke	England	11.48	
