= Athletics at the 1982 Commonwealth Games – Women's 4 × 100 metres relay =

Women's 4 × 100 metres relay at the Commonwealth Games

The women's 4 × 100 metres relay event at the 1982 Commonwealth Games was held on 9 October at the QE II Stadium in Brisbane, Australia.

== Results ==
Rank	Lane	Nation	Athletes	Time	Notes
1st place, gold medalist(s)	1	England	Wendy Hoyte, Kathy Smallwood, Beverley Callender, Sonia Lannaman	43.15	GR
2nd place, silver medalist(s)	7	Canada	Angela Bailey, Marita Payne, Angella Taylor, Molly Killingbeck	43.66	
3rd place, bronze medalist(s)	4	Jamaica	Lelieth Hodges, Merlene Ottey, Cathy Rattray, Grace Jackson	43.69	
4	3	Australia	Jenny Flaherty, Denise Boyd, Colleen Pekin, Helen Davey	43.84	
5	9	Nigeria	Elizabeth Mokogwu, Maria Usifo, Adetutu Ogunde, Rufina Ubah	44.60	
6	2	Trinidad and Tobago	Janice Bernard, Gillian Forde, Maxine McMillan, Angela Williams	44.74	
7	8	Ghana	Grace Armah, Mercy Addy, Georgina Aidoo, Mary Afriyie-Mensah	45.93	
8	6	Kenya	Geraldine Shitandayi, Ruth Waithera, Joyce Odhiambo, Alice Adala	46.13	
9	5	Gambia	Georgiana Freeman, Amie Ndow, Jabou Jawo, Francess Jatta	47.51	
