= Athletics at the 1982 Commonwealth Games – Women's 100 metres =

1982 Commonwealth Games

Women's 100 metres at the Commonwealth Games

The women's 100 metres event at the 1982 Commonwealth Games was held on 3 and 4 October at the QE II Stadium in Brisbane, Australia.

== Medalists ==
| Gold | Silver | Bronze |
|---|---|---|
| Angella Taylor; Canada | Merlene Ottey; Jamaica | Colleen Pekin; Australia |

== Results ==
=== Heats ===
Qualification: First 4 in each heat (Q) and the next 2 fastest (q) qualify for the semifinals.

Wind:
Heat 1: +2.8 m/s, Heat 2: +2.8 m/s, Heat 3: +4.4 m/s, Heat 4: +3.4 m/s

| Rank | Heat | Name | Nationality | Time | Notes |
|---|---|---|---|---|---|
| 1 | 2 | Merlene Ottey | Jamaica | 11.00 | Q |
| 2 | 4 | Colleen Pekin | Australia | 11.25 | Q |
| 3 | 2 | Rufina Ubah | Nigeria | 11.27 | Q |
| 4 | 3 | Angela Bailey | Canada | 11.30 | Q |
| 5 | 1 | Angella Taylor | Canada | 11.32 | Q |
| 6 | 1 | Heather Oakes | England | 11.36 | Q |
| 6 | 3 | Wendy Hoyte | England | 11.36 | Q |
| 8 | 3 | Leanne Lynch | Australia | 11.39 | Q |
| 9 | 2 | Helen Davey | Australia | 11.40 | Q |
| 10 | 4 | Sonia Lannaman | England | 11.41 | Q |
| 11 | 4 | Grace Jackson | Jamaica | 11.46 | Q |
| 12 | 3 | Tutu Ogunde | Nigeria | 11.57 | Q |
| 13 | 1 | Leleith Hodges | Jamaica | 11.69 | Q |
| 14 | 1 | Janice Bernard | Trinidad and Tobago | 11.71 | Q |
| 14 | 2 | Nzaeli Kyomo | Tanzania | 11.71 | Q |
| 16 | 3 | Mary Afriyie-Mensah | Ghana | 11.76 | q |
| 17 | 4 | Tanya Brothers | Canada | 11.80 | Q |
| 18 | 2 | Gillian Forde | Trinidad and Tobago | 11.81 | q |
| 19 | 2 | Grace Armah | Ghana | 11.86 | |
| 20 | 1 | Elizabeth Mokogwu | Nigeria | 11.87 | |
| 21 | 3 | Angela Owen | Isle of Man | 11.90 | |
| 22 | 4 | Joyce Odhiambo | Kenya | 11.94 | |
| 23 | 3 | Alice Adala | Kenya | 11.95 | |
| 24 | 4 | June Caddle | Barbados | 11.96 | |
| 25 | 4 | Jabou Jawo | Gambia | 12.16 | |
| 26 | 1 | Georgina Aidoo | Ghana | 12.17 | |
| 27 | 1 | Geraldine Shitandayi | Kenya | 12.21 | |
| 28 | 1 | Amie Ndow | Gambia | 12.38 | |
| 29 | 2 | Georgiana Freeman | Gambia | 12.44 | |

=== Semifinals ===
Qualification: First 4 in each semifinal (Q) and the next 1 fastest (q) qualify for the final.

Wind:
Heat 1: +3.2 m/s, Heat 2: +3.4 m/s

| Rank | Heat | Name | Nationality | Time | Notes |
|---|---|---|---|---|---|
| 1 | 2 | Angella Taylor | Canada | 10.92 | Q |
| 2 | 1 | Merlene Ottey | Jamaica | 11.02 | Q |
| 3 | 2 | Wendy Hoyte | England | 11.18 | Q |
| 4 | 2 | Rufina Ubah | Nigeria | 11.18 | Q |
| 5 | 1 | Angela Bailey | Canada | 11.24 | Q |
| 5 | 2 | Helen Davey | Australia | 11.24 | Q |
| 7 | 2 | Sonia Lannaman | England | 11.28 | q |
| 8 | 1 | Colleen Pekin | Australia | 11.29 | Q |
| 9 | 1 | Heather Oakes | England | 11.32 | Q |
| 10 | 1 | Leanne Lynch | Australia | 11.42 | |
| 11 | 2 | Grace Jackson | Jamaica | 11.45 | |
| 12 | 2 | Nzaeli Kyomo | Tanzania | 11.59 | |
| 13 | 2 | Janice Bernard | Trinidad and Tobago | 11.61 | |
| 14 | 1 | Leleith Hodges | Jamaica | 11.69 | |
| 15 | 1 | Tutu Ogunde | Nigeria | 11.75 | |
| 16 | 1 | Tanya Brothers | Canada | 11.79 | |
| 17 | 1 | Gillian Forde | Trinidad and Tobago | 11.89 | |
| 18 | 2 | Mary Afriyie-Mensah | Ghana | 11.92 | |

=== Final ===
Wind: +1.4 m/s

| Rank | Lane | Name | Nationality | Time | Notes |
|---|---|---|---|---|---|
| 1st place, gold medalist(s) | 4 | Angella Taylor | Canada | 11.00 | GR |
| 2nd place, silver medalist(s) | 3 | Merlene Ottey | Jamaica | 11.03 | |
| 3rd place, bronze medalist(s) | 1 | Colleen Pekin | Australia | 11.24 | |
| 4 | 2 | Angela Bailey | Canada | 11.30 | |
| 5 | 6 | Wendy Hoyte | England | 11.31 | |
| 5 | 7 | Rufina Ubah | Nigeria | 11.31 | |
| 7 | 9 | Heather Oakes | England | 11.39 | |
| 8 | 8 | Helen Davey | Australia | 11.44 | |
| 9 | 5 | Sonia Lannaman | England | 11.48 | |
