= Maxine Corcoran =

Australian athletics competitor

Personal information
- Born: 22 September 1954 Victoria, Australia
- Died: 29 November 2011 (aged 57) Moorabbin, Victoria
Medal record
Women's Athletics
Representing Australia
Commonwealth Games
Silver medal – second place	Edmonton 1978	4 x 400 metres

Maxine Fay Corcoran (née Johnson; 22 September 1954 — 29 November 2011) was an Australian sprinter and middle-distance runner. She won a silver medal in the 4 x 400 metres relay at the 1978 Commonwealth Games in Edmonton, Canada and also won medals in the national Australian athletics competitions. Corcoran worked as a coach at grassroots levels in educational institutions, worked as a mentor to younger athletes while on the committee of Athletics International, and was Sport Australia Hall of Fame's operations manager.

== Background and personality ==
Maxine Johnson was born on 22 September 1954 in the Australian state of Victoria. She met the sports administrator and the future people and development manager of the Essendon Football Club Danny Corcoran in 1973; the two married in 1978. They have three children. Len Johnson of The Age described her as a loyal individual who established friendships in her early years and maintaining them and attended social and sports occasions involving her children. Corcoran had a sense of humour, was friendly, pleasant and committed to her work in promoting the development of the sport of athletics.

== Athletics career ==
She began her athletic career by partaking in the 1971–72 Australian Junior Athletics Championships in the 400 metres. Corcoran won the silver medal by finishing the race in a time of 56.3 seconds. She went on to win the gold medals in the 400 metres in 1978 and 1979 with respective times 52.2 and 52.04 seconds. She ran for the Melbourne-based Glenroy women's club and was teammates with the throwers Gael Martin, Bev Francis and Pam Matthews and the sprinter Denise Boyd (née Robertson). At the 1978 Commonwealth Games in Edmonton, Canada, she won the silver medal in the women's 4 x 400 metres relay with Judy Peckham, Boyd and Bethanie Nail in a time of 3 minutes and 28.65 seconds. Corcoran had finished eighth in the women's 400 metres event with a time of 54.46 seconds. She was later selected to represent Australia at the 1982 Commonwealth Games in Brisbane, Queensland in the women's 400 metres and was its back-up sprinter for the women's 4 x 400 relay. Corcoran completed the women's 400 metres event in a time of 53.03 seconds and placed tenth overall.

== Later years and death ==
She later retired to move into coaching athletes at grassroots levels at the Xavier College. Corcoran later worked at the Glenhuntly Athletics Club and was the middle-distance running coach at the Caulfield Grammar School. She later joined the committee of the former elite athletes club Athletics International in 1997 to support athletics and later became its vice-president. Corcoran was involved in its Under 19 and Under 21 mentor programs to pair young athletes with mentors from previous years and they were operated in conjunction with the national governing body Athletics Australia.

In 2007, she joined the Sport Australia Hall of Fame (SAHOF) as operations manager. Corcoran worked to develop SAHOF's Scholarship and Mentoring program. She also supported her husband's activities at Essendon Football Club and the Melbourne Football Club of the Australian Football League. In early October 2011, while coaching the athlete Kelly Hetherington at the 2011 Summer Universiade in Shenzhen, China, Corcoran became dizzy and lost feeling in her limbs. Scans soon after detected an aggressive brain tumour. Corcoran died at the Monash Medical Centre in Moorabbin, Victoria on 29 November 2011. A funeral for her took place in Melbourne not long after.
