= Athletics at the 1978 Commonwealth Games – Women's 4 × 400 metres relay =

Women's 4 × 400 metres relay at the Commonwealth Games

The women's 4 × 400 metres relay event at the 1978 Commonwealth Games was held on 12 August at the Commonwealth Stadium in Edmonton, Alberta, Canada.

== Results ==
Rank	Nation	Athletes	Time	Notes
1st place, gold medalist(s)	England	Ruth Kennedy, Joslyn Hoyte, Verona Elder, Donna Hartley	3:27.19	GR
2nd place, silver medalist(s)	Australia	Bethanie Nail, Denise Boyd, Maxine Corcoran, Judy Peckham	3:28.65	
3rd place, bronze medalist(s)	Canada	Anne Mackie-Morelli, Debbie Campbell, Margaret Stride, Rachelle Campbell	3:35.83	
4	Scotland	Ann Harley, Evelyn McMeekin, Helen Golden, Karen Williams	3:36.52	
5	Ghana	Georgina Aidoo, Grace Bakari, Hannah Afriye, Helen Opoku	3:37.12	
6	Jamaica	Debbie Byfield-White, Helen Blake, Maureen Gottschalk, Normalee Murray	3:37.92	
