= Athletics at the 1978 Commonwealth Games – Women's 400 metres =

Women's 400 metres at the Commonwealth Games

The women's 400 metres event at the 1978 Commonwealth Games was held on 6 and 7 August at the Commonwealth Stadium in Edmonton, Alberta, Canada.

== Medalists ==
Gold	Silver	Bronze
Donna Hartley; England	Verona Elder; England	Bethanie Nail; Australia

== Results ==
=== Heats ===
Held on 6 August

Qualification: First 5 in each heat (Q) and the next 1 fastest (q) qualify for the semifinals.

Rank	Heat	Name	Nationality	Time	Notes
1	3	June Griffith	Guyana	52.71	Q
2	2	Donna Hartley	England	52.86	Q
3	3	Joslyn Hoyte	England	53.00	Q
4	3	Helen Blake	Jamaica	53.14	Q
5	2	Bethanie Nail	Australia	53.27	Q
6	2	Ruth Waithera	Kenya	53.36	Q
7	2	Debbie Byfield-White	Jamaica	53.77	Q
8	2	Margaret Stride	Canada	53.81	Q
9	1	Verona Elder	England	53.84	Q
10	2	Adrienne Smyth	Northern Ireland	53.96	q
11	1	Maxine Corcoran	Australia	54.05	Q
12	2	Grace Bakari	Ghana	54.17	
13	1	Karen Williams	Scotland	54.28	Q
14	3	Penny Hunt	New Zealand	54.53	Q
15	3	Ann Harley	Scotland	54.54	Q
16	1	Ruth Williams-Simpson	Jamaica	54.77	Q
17	1	Linda McCurry	Northern Ireland	54.83	Q
18	1	Freida Nicholls	Barbados	54.93	
19	3	Rachelle Campbell	Canada	54.98	
20	3	Georgina Aidoo	Ghana	55.16	
21	3	Jennifer Boca	Grenada	56.27	
22	1	Charity Muhuhe	Kenya	56.75	
23	1	Violet Molobeka	Zambia	57.04	
24	2	Haddy N'Jie	Gambia	1:06.43	

=== Semifinals ===
Held on 6 August

Qualification: First 4 in each semifinal (Q) qualify directly for the final.

Rank	Heat	Name	Nationality	Time	Notes
1	1	June Griffith	Guyana	51.40	Q
2	2	Donna Hartley	England	52.26	Q
3	1	Verona Elder	England	52.49	Q
4	1	Bethanie Nail	Australia	52.51	Q
5	2	Helen Blake	Jamaica	52.63	Q
6	1	Joslyn Hoyte	England	52.79	Q
6	2	Maxine Corcoran	Australia	52.79	Q
8	2	Karen Williams	Scotland	52.98	Q
9	1	Ruth Waithera	Kenya	53.30	
10	2	Margaret Stride	Canada	53.68	
11	2	Debbie Byfield-White	Jamaica	54.09	
12	2	Penny Hunt	New Zealand	54.26	
13	1	Adrienne Smyth	Northern Ireland	54.40	
14	2	Linda McCurry	Northern Ireland	54.98	
15	1	Ann Harley	Scotland	55.32	
16	1	Ruth Williams-Simpson	Jamaica	57.03	

=== Final ===
Held on 7 August

Rank	Name	Nationality	Time	Notes
1st place, gold medalist(s)	Donna Hartley	England	51.69	
2nd place, silver medalist(s)	Verona Elder	England	52.94	
3rd place, bronze medalist(s)	Bethanie Nail	Australia	53.06	
4	Joslyn Hoyte	England	53.22	
5	June Griffith	Guyana	53.25	
6	Karen Williams	Scotland	53.66	
7	Helen Blake	Jamaica	54.15	
8	Maxine Corcoran	Australia	54.46	
