= Athletics at the 1983 Summer Universiade – Women's 100 metres =

The women's 100 metres event at the 1983 Summer Universiade was held at the Commonwealth Stadium in Edmonton, Canada on 5 and 6 July 1983.

== Medalists ==
Gold	Silver	Bronze
Beverly Kinch; Great Britain	Randy Givens; United States	Angella Taylor; Canada

== Results ==
=== Heats ===
Held on 5 July

Wind:
Heat 1: +0.3 m/s, Heat 2: -0.6 m/s, Heat 3: ? m/s, Heat 4: -0.5 m/s

Rank	Heat	Athlete	Nationality	Time	Notes
1	2	Beverly Kinch	Great Britain	11.30	Q
2	1	Angella Taylor	Canada	11.39	Q
3	4	Randy Givens	United States	11.47	Q
4	1	Grace Jackson	Jamaica	11.52	Q
5	1	Jackie Washington	United States	11.54	Q
6	4	Olga Antonova	Soviet Union	11.55	Q
7	2	Laurence Bily	France	11.56	Q
8	3	Marina Romanova	Soviet Union	11.57	Q
9	2	Elke Vollmer	West Germany	11.61	Q
10	1	Marisa Masullo	Italy	11.65	q
10	2	Daniela Ferrian	Italy	11.65	q
12	3	Esmeralda de Jesus Garcia	Brazil	11.78	Q
13	4	Marie-France Mollex	France	11.82	Q
14	3	Madeline de Jesús	Puerto Rico	11.94	Q
15	3	Tanya Brothers	Canada	11.95	q
16	4	Nazel Kuomo	Tanzania	12.17	q
17	4	Alejandra Flores	Mexico	12.21	
18	2	Noelia Shillingford	Dominican Republic	12.34	
19	3	Vangelia Ilieva	Bulgaria	12.56	
20	3	May Sardouk	Lebanon	13.06	
21	1	Navla Abou Sleihan	Lebanon	13.28	
22	2	Maria Carvalho	Angola	13.61	
23	4	Maria Gourgel	Angola	14.00	

=== Semifinals ===
Held on 6 July

Wind:
Heat 1: 0.0 m/s, Heat 2: 0.0 m/s

Rank	Heat	Athlete	Nationality	Time	Notes
1	2	Beverly Kinch	Great Britain	11.33	Q
2	1	Randy Givens	United States	11.34	Q
3	1	Angella Taylor	Canada	11.36	Q
4	1	Olga Antonova	Soviet Union	11.40	Q
5	2	Jackie Washington	United States	11.43	Q
6	2	Marina Romanova	Soviet Union	11.49	Q
7	2	Grace Jackson	Jamaica	11.50	q
8	2	Marisa Masullo	Italy	11.53	q
9	1	Elke Vollmer	West Germany	11.64	
10	2	Esmeralda de Jesus Garcia	Brazil	11.65	
11	1	Laurence Bily	France	11.68	
12	1	Daniela Ferrian	Italy	11.73	
13	2	Marie-France Mollex	France	11.83	
14	1	Madeline de Jesús	Puerto Rico	11.91	
15	2	Tanya Brothers	Canada	11.97	
	1	Nazel Kuomo	Tanzania	??.??	

=== Final ===
Held on 6 July

Wind: +2.2 m/s

Rank	Athlete	Nationality	Time	Notes
1st place, gold medalist(s)	Beverly Kinch	Great Britain	11.13 w	
2nd place, silver medalist(s)	Randy Givens	United States	11.16 w	
3rd place, bronze medalist(s)	Angella Taylor	Canada	11.17 w	
4	Jackie Washington	United States	11.31 w	
5	Olga Antonova	Soviet Union	11.32 w	
6	Grace Jackson	Jamaica	11.36 w	
7	Marisa Masullo	Italy	11.43 w	
8	Marina Romanova	Soviet Union	11.49 w	
