= Athletics at the 1982 Commonwealth Games – Women's 400 metres =

Women's 400 metres at the Commonwealth Games

The women's 400 metres event at the 1982 Commonwealth Games was held on 3 and 4 October at the QE II Stadium in Brisbane, Australia.

== Medalists ==
Gold	Silver	Bronze
Raelene Boyle; Australia	Michelle Scutt; Wales	Joslyn Hoyte-Smith; England

== Results ==
=== Heats ===
Qualification: First 5 in each heat (Q) and the next 3 fastest (q) qualify for the semifinals.

Rank	Heat	Name	Nationality	Time	Notes
1	3	Michelle Scutt	Wales	52.49	Q
2	2	Joslyn Hoyte-Smith	England	52.50	Q
3	3	Gladys Taylor	England	52.64	Q
4	1	Linsey MacDonald	Scotland	52.70	Q
5	1	Raelene Boyle	Australia	52.71	Q
6	3	Leanne Evans	Australia	53.02	Q
7	1	Molly Killingbeck	Canada	53.03	Q
8	3	Charmaine Crooks	Canada	53.10	Q
9	2	Cathy Rattray	Jamaica	53.20	Q
10	1	Kim Robertson	New Zealand	53.39	Q
11	2	Maxine Corcoran	Australia	53.64	Q
12	1	Mercy Addy	Ghana	53.69	Q
13	2	Marita Payne	Canada	53.71	Q
14	3	June Griffith	Guyana	53.72	Q
15	1	Carmen Smart	Wales	53.82	q
16	1	Ruth Waithera	Kenya	53.82	q
17	2	Angela Bridgeman	Scotland	53.91	Q
18	3	Sadia Sowunmi	Nigeria	56.20	q
19	3	Rose Tata-Muya	Kenya	56.27	
20	2	Yolande Small	Trinidad and Tobago	56.32	
21	2	Ruth Atuti	Kenya	56.52	
22	2	Elanga Buala	Papua New Guinea	57.81	
23	3	Mary-Estelle Kapalu	Vanuatu	59.85	
	1	Linda Forsyth	England	DNF	

=== Semifinals ===
Qualification: First 4 in each semifinal (Q) and the next 1 fastest (q) qualify for the final.

Rank	Heat	Name	Nationality	Time	Notes
1	1	Joslyn Hoyte-Smith	England	52.6	Q
2	1	Raelene Boyle	Australia	52.64	Q
3	2	Michelle Scutt	Wales	52.86	Q
4	1	June Griffith	Guyana	52.88	Q
5	1	Kim Robertson	New Zealand	52.94	Q
6	1	Molly Killingbeck	Canada	53.04	q
7	2	Linsey MacDonald	Scotland	53.21	Q
8	2	Gladys Taylor	England	53.28	Q
9	1	Maxine Corcoran	Australia	53.29	
10	2	Charmaine Crooks	Canada	53.34	Q
11	2	Cathy Rattray	Jamaica	53.60	
12	2	Leanne Evans	Australia	53.60	
13	1	Marita Payne	Canada	54.06	
14	2	Angela Bridgeman	Scotland	54.09	
15	2	Sadia Sowunmi	Nigeria	54.43	
16	1	Carmen Smart	Wales	54.75	
17	2	Ruth Waithera	Kenya	56.37	
	1	Mercy Addy	Ghana	DNF	

=== Final ===
Rank	Lane	Name	Nationality	Time	Notes
1st place, gold medalist(s)	4	Raelene Boyle	Australia	51.97	
2nd place, silver medalist(s)	7	Michelle Scutt	Wales	51.26	
3rd place, bronze medalist(s)	1	Joslyn Hoyte-Smith	England	52.53	
4	2	Gladys Taylor	England	52.56	
5	5	Kim Robertson	New Zealand	53.02	
6	3	Molly Killingbeck	Canada	53.10	
7	6	Charmaine Crooks	Canada	53.16	
8	8	June Griffith	Guyana	53.67	
9	9	Linsey MacDonald	Scotland	53.87	
