= Athletics at the 1983 Pan American Games – Women's 4 × 100 metres relay =

Women's 4 × 100 metres relay at the Pan American Games

The women's 4 × 100 metres relay event at the 1983 Pan American Games was held in Caracas, Venezuela on 28 August.

== Results ==
Rank	Nation	Athletes	Time	Notes
1st place, gold medalist(s)	United States	Alice Jackson, Jackie Washington, Brenda Cliette, Randy Givens	43.21	
2nd place, silver medalist(s)	Trinidad and Tobago	Gillian Forde, Janice Bernard, Esther Hope, Angela Williams	44.63	
3rd place, bronze medalist(s)	Canada	Karen Nelson, Tanya Brothers, Charmaine Crooks, Jillian Richardson	44.77	
4	Cuba	Elida Aveillé, Luisa Ferrer, Ester Petitón, Susana Armenteros	45.09	
5	Antigua and Barbuda	Gloria Smith, Ruperta Charles, Joycelyn Joseph, Terry Juliens	48.27	
