= 1973 CARIFTA Games =

II CARIFTA Games
- Dates: May 4–5
- Host city: Port of Spain, Trinidad and Tobago
- Level: Junior and Youth
- Events: 34
- Participation: about 137 athletes from 10 nations

The 2nd CARIFTA Games was held in Port of Spain, Trinidad and Tobago on May 4–5, 1973.

== Participation (unofficial) ==
Detailed result lists can be found on the "World Junior Athletics History" website. An unofficial count yields the number of about 137 athletes (116 junior (under-20) and 21 youth (under-17)) from about 10 countries: Bahamas (8), Barbados (26), Bermuda (19), Grenada (9), Guyana (10), Jamaica (32), Lesser Antilles (2), Saint Vincent and the Grenadines (3), Trinidad and Tobago (27), US Virgin Islands (1).

== Medal summary ==
Medal winners are published by category: Boys under 20 (Junior), Girls under 20 (Junior), Boys under 17 (Youth), and Girls under 17 (Youth), Complete results can be found on the "World Junior Athletics History" website.

=== Boys under 20 (Junior) ===
Event	Gold		Silver		Bronze	
100 metres	Calvin Dill (BER)	10.5	W. Brown (JAM)	10.6	Noel Lynch (BAR)	10.7
200 metres	Calvin Dill (BER)	21.6	Noel Gray (JAM)	21.6	Charles Headlam (JAM)	21.8
400 metres	Noel Gray (JAM)	46.9	Jeffrey McLeod (JAM)	46.9	Horace Tuitt (TRI)	47.2
800 metres	Horace Tuitt (TRI)	1:52.4	L. Gurzong (JAM)	1:56.5	Anthony October (GUY)	1:57.4
1500 metres	Bryan Henderson (BAR)	4:11.6	L. Gurzong (JAM)	4:11.6	P. Barker (GUY)	4:12.2
3000 metres	P. Bryan (JAM)	9:25.3	Floyd Patrick (BAR)	9:25.6	Bryan Henderson (BAR)	9:26.0
110 metres hurdles	Clive Barriffe (JAM)	14.8	Everist Alexis (TRI)	15.3	B. Barclay (JAM)	15.4
300 metres hurdles	Clive Barriffe (JAM)	41.0	Mark Stoute (BAR)	42.1	Winston Mora-Scott (TRI)	42.4
High jump	Clive Barriffe (JAM)	1.95	Wade Mitchell (TRI)	1.88	Clark Godwin (BER)	1.85
Long jump	Anthony Joseph (TRI)	7.36	Glen Lake (BER)	6.43	L. Watson (JAM)	6.35
Triple jump	Michael Sharpe (BER)	14.70	Wilfred Gonsales (BER)	14.08	Peter Pratt (BAH)	13.94
Shot put	Leon Brown (JAM)	15.70	Timothy Payne (BAR)	13.88	Dilton Woodley (BER)	12.77
Discus throw	Leon Brown (JAM)	47.32	K. Simpson (JAM)	45.64	B. Murphie (BER)	41.88
Javelin throw	George Best (BAR)	51.43	Michael Andrews (TRI)	50.50	John Cato (VIN)	48.24
4 × 100 metres relay	Jamaica	42.2	Barbados	42.4	Grenada	42.5
4 × 400 metres relay	Jamaica; Jeffrey McLeod; M. Hanna; Charles Headlam; Noel Gray	3:14.0	Trinidad and Tobago; Searl Pascall; Winston Mora-Scott; Michael Andrews; Horace Tuitt	3:18.6	Grenada	3:20.4

=== Girls under 20 (Junior) ===
Event	Gold		Silver		Bronze	
100 metres	Regina Montague (JAM)	12.0	Marcia Trotman (BAR)	12.2	Janet Stoute (BAR)	12.3
200 metres	Marcia Trotman (BAR)	24.4	Regina Montague (JAM)	24.8	Maureen Gottshalk (JAM)	24.9
400 metres	Ruth Alexander (TRI)	57.5	Elaine Ramsay (JAM)	58.8	Carletta McNabb (JAM)	61.1
800 metres	Heather Gooding (BAR)	2:15.3	Marva Edwards (TRI)	2:15.4	Carmen Watson (JAM)	2:17.6
100 metres hurdles	Andrea Bruce (JAM)	14.6	Andora Sterling (BER)	16.0	Yvette Coombs (TRI)	16.5
High jump	Andrea Bruce (JAM)	1.67	Lorraine Reid (JAM)	1.67	Marlene Bascombe (BAR)	1.57
Long jump	Andrea Bruce (JAM)	5.71	Branwen Smith (BER)	5.52	June Griffith (GUY)	5.35
Shot put	Branwen Smith (BER)	11.62	Winsome Langley (JAM)	10.79	Bessie Horton (BER)	10.14
Discus throw	Winsome Langley (JAM)	30.00	Kayrene Rawlins (BAR)	29.06	Anne Reid (BAR)	28.90
Javelin throw	Lyn George (TRI)	38.90	Bessie Horton (BER)	35.38	Mary Williams (TRI)	26.52
4 × 100 metres relay	Jamaica; M. Robinson; Regina Montague; Andrea Bruce; Marcia Svaby	47.2	Trinidad and Tobago; Laura Pierre; Angela McLean; Sandra Fournillier; Janice Bernard	47.5	Barbados	48.3
4 × 400 metres relay	Trinidad and Tobago; Jennifer Augustine; Marva Edwards; Laura Pierre; Ruth Alexander	3:53.2	Barbados; P. Larrier; C. Jones; V. Yearwood; W. Rochester	3:58.3	Jamaica; Elaine Ramsay; Carmen Watson; Maureen Gottshalk; Carletta McNabb	3:58.5

=== Boys under 17 (Youth) ===
Event	Gold		Silver		Bronze	
100 metres	Maurice Beecher (JAM)	11.0	O. James (JAM)	11.1	Searl Pascall (TRI)	11.2
200 metres	Maurice Beecher (JAM)	22.9	O. James (JAM)	23.1	G. Andrews (TRI)	23.5
400 metres	Searl Pascall (TRI)	50.4	Trevor Small (BAR)	51.8	Michael Hyacinth (GRN)	53.5

=== Girls under 17 (Youth) ===
Event	Gold		Silver		Bronze	
100 metres	Debbie Jones (BER)	12.2	Jacintha Ballantyne (VIN)	12.6	Imogene Morris (JAM)	12.7
200 metres	Dorothy Scott (JAM)	25.4	Debbie Jones (BER)	25.9	M. Sylvester (TRI)	26.3
400 metres	Cheryl Blackman (BAR)	58.4	Jennifer Boca (GRN)	59.1	Ann Adams (TRI)	59.2

== Medal table (unofficial) ==
* Host nation (Trinidad and Tobago)

Rank	Nation	Gold	Silver	Bronze	Total
1	Jamaica	18	12	8	38
2	Trinidad and Tobago*	6	6	8	20
3	Barbados	5	8	6	19
4	Bermuda	5	6	4	15
5	Grenada	0	1	3	4
6	Saint Vincent and the Grenadines	0	1	1	2
7	Guyana	0	0	3	3
8	Bahamas	0	0	1	1
Totals (8 entries)		34	34	34	102
