= Athletics at the 1981 Summer Universiade – Women's 4 × 100 metres relay =

The women's 4 × 100 metres relay event at the 1981 Summer Universiade was held at the Stadionul Naţional in Bucharest on 26 July 1981.

== Results ==
Rank	Nation	Athletes	Time	Notes
1st place, gold medalist(s)	United States	Michelle Glover, Carol Lewis, Jackie Washington, Benita Fitzgerald	43.66	
2nd place, silver medalist(s)	Great Britain	Yvette Wray, Kathy Smallwood, Sue Hearnshaw, Beverley Goddard	43.86	
3rd place, bronze medalist(s)	Italy	Antonella Capriotti, Carla Mercurio, Patrizia Lombardo, Marisa Masullo	44.43	
4	Romania	Lucia Negovan, Niculina Chiricuţă, Doina Ciolan, Adele Alexa	45.56	
	Soviet Union	Olga Zolotaryova, Olga Korotkova, Olga Nasonova, Raisa Makhova	DQ	
	Lebanon		DQ	
