= Athletics at the 1978 Commonwealth Games – Women's 4 × 100 metres relay =

Women's 4 × 100 metres relay at the Commonwealth Games

The women's 4 × 100 metres relay event at the 1978 Commonwealth Games was held on 12 August at the Commonwealth Stadium in Edmonton, Alberta, Canada.

== Results ==
Rank	Lane	Nation	Athletes	Time	Notes
1st place, gold medalist(s)	7	England	Beverley Goddard, Kathy Smallwood, Sharon Colyear, Sonia Lannaman	43.70	
2nd place, silver medalist(s)	8	Canada	Angela Bailey, Margaret Howe, Marjorie Bailey, Patty Loverock	44.26	
3rd place, bronze medalist(s)	5	Australia	Colleen Beazley, Denise Boyd, Lyn Jacenko, Roxanne Gelle	44.78	
4	3	New Zealand	Gail Wooten, Kim Robertson, Penny Hunt, Wendy Brown	45.06	
5	6	Jamaica	Carmeta Drummond, Dorothy Scott, Maureen Gottschalk, Normalee Murray	45.75	
6	1	Trinidad and Tobago	Esther Hope, Janice Bernard, Joanne Gardner, Marilyn Bradley	45.80	
7	4	Scotland	Elaine Davidson, Helen Golden, Karen Williams, Margot Wells	45.91	
	2	Gambia		DNS	
