= Athletics at the 1970 British Commonwealth Games – Women's 1500 metres =

Women's 1500 metres at the 1970 British Commonwealth Games
- Venue: Meadowbank Stadium, Edinburgh
- Dates: 23 July 1970

Medalists
gold medal	Rita Ridley	England
silver medal	Joan Page	England
bronze medal	Thelma Fynn	Canada

The women's 1500 metres event at the 1970 British Commonwealth Games was held on 23 July at the Meadowbank Stadium in Edinburgh, Scotland. It was the first time that a race this long was held for women at the Games.

The winning margin was 0.2 seconds which as of 2024 remains the narrowest winning margin for the women's 1500 metres at these games.

== Results ==
Final results
Rank	Name	Nationality	Time	Notes
1st place, gold medalist(s)	Rita Ridley	England	4:18.8	
2nd place, silver medalist(s)	Joan Page	England	4:19.0	
3rd place, bronze medalist(s)	Thelma Fynn	Canada	4:19.1	
4	Penny Werthner	Canada	4:21.3	
5	Norine Braithwaite	England	4:21.3	
6	Val Robinson	New Zealand	4:22.2	
7	Margaret MacSherry	Scotland	4:23.6	
8	Christine Haskett	Scotland	4:23.8	
9	Sylvia Potts	New Zealand	4:25.2	
10	Anne Smith	New Zealand	4:26.8	
	Adrienne Smyth	Northern Ireland	DNS	
