= 1974 CARIFTA Games =

III CARIFTA Games
- Dates: April 13–15
- Host city: Kingston, Jamaica
- Level: Junior and Youth
- Events: 34
- Participation: about 137 athletes from 8 nations

The 3rd CARIFTA Games was held in Kingston, Jamaica on April 13–15, 1974.

== Participation (unofficial) ==
Detailed result lists can be found on the "World Junior Athletics History" website. An unofficial count yields the number of about 137 athletes (116 junior (under-20) and 21 youth (under-17)) from about countries: Bahamas (17), Barbados (24), Bermuda (30), Jamaica (27), Lesser Antilles/Antigua and Barbuda (8), Saint Vincent and the Grenadines (5), Trinidad and Tobago (23), US Virgin Islands (3).

== Medal summary ==
Medal winners are published by category: Boys under 20 (Junior), Girls under 20 (Junior), Boys under 17 (Youth), and Girls under 17 (Youth). Complete results can be found on the "World Junior Athletics History" website.

=== Boys under 20 (Junior) ===
Event	Gold		Silver		Bronze	
100 metres	Noel Lynch (BAR)	10.7	Michael Sharpe (BER)	10.8	Colin Bradford (JAM)	10.8
200 metres	Calvin Dill (BER)	21.5	Noel Lynch (BAR)	21.9	Colin Bradford (JAM)	21.9
400 metres	Charles Headlam (JAM)	48.5	Barrington Smith (JAM)	49.2	Anthony Meyers (TRI)	49.3
800 metres	Charles Headlam (JAM)	1:56.0	Errol Atlan (JAM)	1:56.6	Trevor Small (BAR)	1:56.9
1500 metres	Louis Trotman (BAR)	4:04.0	Trevor Small (BAR)	4:04.9	Patrick Roxburgh (JAM)	4:05.9
3000 metres	Steve Braithwaite (TRI)	9:11.8	Louis Trotman (BAR)	9:11.9	Floyd Patrick (BAR)	9:14.5
110 metres hurdles	Clive Barriffe (JAM)	14.8	Mark Stoute (BAR)	15.5	Jocelyn Wynter (JAM)	15.6
400 metres hurdles	Clive Barriffe (JAM)	54.7	Mark Stoute (BAR)	55.7	Kelshall Rivas (TRI)	58.3
High jump	Owen Cunningham (JAM)	1.98	Clive Barriffe (JAM)	1.98	Wade Mitchell (TRI)	1.955
Pole vault	Everton Cornelius (ATG)	3.25	Gerald Basden (BER)	2.94		
Long jump	Dennis Trott (BER)	6.81	Glen Lake (BER)	6.73	Everton Cornelius (ATG)	6.69
Triple jump	Michael Sharpe (BER)	15.40	David Green (JAM)	14.84	Rommell Small (BAR)	14.03
Shot put	Dennis Thompson (JAM)	13.78	Marcus Joseph (TRI)	13.26	Birtchfield Martin (ATG)	13.24
Discus throw	Dennis Thompson (JAM)	43.62	Dilton Woodley (BER)	39.86	Rommell Small (BAR)	39.30
Javelin throw	Robert Moulder (BER)	55.82	Cordell De Silva (VIN)	50.90	Malcolm Smith (BER)	49.66
4 × 100 metres relay	Bermuda	41.1	Jamaica	41.2	Trinidad and Tobago	42.5
4 × 400 metres relay	Jamaica	3:13.8	Barbados	3:20.9	Bermuda	3:23.7

=== Girls under 20 (Junior) ===
Event	Gold		Silver		Bronze	
100 metres	Dorothy Scott (JAM)	12.0	Debbie Jones (BER)	12.0	Regina Montague (JAM)	12.4
200 metres	Marcia Trotman (BAR)	24.5	Debbie Jones (BER)	24.6	Maureen Gottshalk (JAM)	24.7
400 metres	Maureen Gottshalk (JAM)	55.5	Marva Edwards (TRI)	57.1	Barbara Bishop (BAR)	57.1
800 metres	Carletta McNabb (JAM)	2:15.0	Heather Gooding (BAR)	2:16.8	Marva Edwards (TRI)	2:16.9
100 metres hurdles	Cheryl Blackman (BAR)	15.3	Lola Ramsay (JAM)	15.6	Sharon Wilson (BAR)	15.9
High jump	Melany McDonald (JAM)	1.625	Linda Woodside (BAH)	1.575	Marlene Bascombe (BAR)	1.55
Long jump	Dorothy Scott (JAM)	5.62	Sharon Wilson (BAR)	5.51	Halcien Gallimore (JAM)	5.44
Shot put	Winsome Langley (JAM)	11.31	Denise Moss (BAH)	10.35	Bessie Horton (BER)	10.30
Discus throw	Winsome Langley (JAM)	34.92	Rhonda Rawlins (BER)	30.98	Fontane Archer (BAR)	28.64
Javelin throw	Lyn George (TRI)	34.98	Lucille George (TRI)	33.58	Glenda De Peiza (BAR)	32.76
4 × 100 metres relay	Jamaica	46.7	Barbados	47.8	Bermuda	47.9
4 × 400 metres relay	Barbados	3:47.5	Jamaica	3:48.5	Trinidad and Tobago	3:54.5

=== Boys under 17 (Youth) ===
Event	Gold		Silver		Bronze	
100 metres	Rickey Moxey (BAH)	11.3	Norman Allen (JAM)	11.4	Colin Corbin (BAR)	11.4
200 metres	Errol Williams (JAM)	23.7	Rickey Seymour (BAH)	23.7	Ronald Swan (BER)	23.8
400 metres	Norman Allen (JAM)	50.1	Noel Fairclough (JAM)	50.5	Richard Ross (TRI)	50.8

=== Girls under 17 (Youth) ===
Event	Gold		Silver		Bronze	
100 metres	Debbie Jones (BER)	12.3	Esther Hope (TRI)	12.7	Verna Laidlow (JAM)	12.9
200 metres	Debbie Jones (BER)	24.6	Esther Hope (TRI)	25.4	Ann Adams (TRI)	25.7

== Medal table (unofficial) ==
* Host nation (Jamaica)

Rank	Nation	Gold	Silver	Bronze	Total
1	Jamaica*	18	9	8	35
2	Bermuda	7	7	5	19
3	Barbados	5	9	10	24
4	Trinidad and Tobago	2	5	8	15
5	Bahamas	1	3	0	4
6	Antigua and Barbuda	1	0	2	3
7	Saint Vincent and the Grenadines	0	1	0	1
Totals (7 entries)		34	34	33	101
