= 1975 CARIFTA Games =

IV CARIFTA Games
- Dates: March 29–31
- Host city: Hamilton, Bermuda
- Level: Junior and Youth
- Events: 36
- Participation: about 76 athletes from 6 nations

The 4th CARIFTA Games was held in Hamilton, Bermuda on March 29–31, 1975.

== Participation (unofficial) ==
Detailed result lists can be found on the "World Junior Athletics History" website. An unofficial count yields the number of about 76 athletes (66 junior (under-20) and 10 youth (under-17)) from about 6 countries: Bahamas (6), Barbados (13), Bermuda (17), Guyana (4), Jamaica (20), Trinidad and Tobago (16).

== Medal summary ==
Medal winners are published by category: Boys under 20 (Junior), Girls under 20 (Junior), Boys under 17 (Youth), and Girls under 17 (Youth). Complete results can be found on the "World Junior Athletics History" website.

=== Boys under 20 (Junior) ===
Event	Gold		Silver		Bronze	
100 metres	Michael Sharpe (BER)	10.5	Gregory Simons (BER)	10.5	Rickey Moxey (BAH)	10.8
200 metres	Gregory Simons (BER)	21.9	Noel Lynch (BAR)	22.2	Hamil Grimes (BAR)	22.3
400 metres	Searl Pascall (TRI)	49.6	Harcourt Wason (BAR)	50.5	Patrick McKenzie (JAM)	52.0
800 metres	Trevor Small (BAR)	1:55.4	James Robinson (JAM)	1:55.7	Patrick Roxburgh (JAM)	1:56.9
1500 metres	Trevor Small (BAR)	4:11.0	Michael Watson (BER)	4:11.3	Louis Charles (TRI)	4:11.6
3000 metres	Louis Charles (TRI)	8:59.3	Michael Watson (BER)	9:00.8	Barrington Campbell (JAM)	9:03.9
110 metres hurdles	Jocelyn Wynter (JAM)	15.1	Mark Stoute (BAR)	15.4	Karl Smith (JAM)	15.4
400 metres hurdles	Mark Stoute (BAR)	55.3	Searl Pascall (TRI)	56.0	Antoine Stirling (BER)	57.4
High jump	Owen Cunningham (JAM)	1.83	Mortimer Stirling (BER)	1.78	Henderson Bayley (BAR)	1.67
Pole vault	Scott Stallard (BER)	3.05	Evert Giscombe (JAM)	2.74		
Long jump	Michael Sharpe (BER)	7.68	Glen Lake (BER)	7.43	Alwyn Chambers (JAM)	7.22
Triple jump	Michael Sharpe (BER)	16.16	Anthony Wade (BER)	15.35	Alwyn Chambers (JAM)	14.95
Shot put	Davy Mason (BAR)	15.40	Neville Murray (JAM)	15.38	Dennis Thompson (JAM)	14.84
Discus throw	Dilton Woodley (BER)	49.06	Brad Cooper (BAH)	47.12	Dennis Thompson (JAM)	46.26
Javelin throw	Scott Stallard (BER)	54.82	Henderson Bayley (BAR)	51.86	Leonel Schultz (GUY)	50.06
4 × 100 metres relay	Bermuda	41.5	Barbados	42.2	Trinidad and Tobago; David Modeste; Cyril Lewis; Anthony Husbands; Ken Barton	42.3
4 × 400 metres relay	Trinidad and Tobago; Mike Hinkson; Anthony Myers; Searl Pascall; Ken Barton	3:23.8	Barbados	3:29.6	Jamaica	3:30.9

=== Girls under 20 (Junior) ===
Event	Gold		Silver		Bronze	
100 metres	Debbie Jones (BER)	11.2w	Andrea Trott (BER)	11.8w	Janice Bernard (TRI)	11.8w
200 metres	Debbie Jones (BER)	23.5	Jackie Pusey (JAM)	24.1	Andrea Trott (BER)	24.4
400 metres	Debbie Jones (BER)	55.4	Jackie Pusey (JAM)	57.0	Donna-Mae Bean (BER)	57.8
800 metres	Carletta McNabb (JAM)	2:14.?	Reva Knight (JAM)	2:16.0	Jennifer Gibson (BAR)	2:20.6
1500 metres	Carletta McNabb (JAM)	5:01.5	Reva Knight (JAM)	5:03.0	Cheryll Haynes (BAR)	5:06.7
100 metres hurdles	Cheryl Blackman (BAR)	14.8	Lola Ramsay (JAM)	14.8	Ann Adams (TRI)	15.3
High jump	June Griffith (GUY)	1.625	Linda Woodside (BAH)	1.625	Heather Mills (JAM)	1.60
Long jump	Andrea Trott (BER)	5.71	Linda Woodside (BAH)	5.62	Shonel Ferguson (BAH)	5.50
Shot put	Branwen Smith (BER)	12.13	Bessie Horton (BER)	11.95	Pat Skinner (BAR)	11.46
Discus throw	Elnur Smith (BAH)	35.84	Rhonda Rawlins (BER)	35.76	Bessie Horton (BER)	33.46
Javelin throw	Lyn George (TRI)	40.34	Bessie Horton (BER)	36.70	Donna Kendall (GUY)	33.74
4 × 100 metres relay	Bermuda	46.8	Trinidad and Tobago; Ann Adams; Sandra Fournillier; Esther Hope; Janice Bernard	48.1	Barbados	48.7
4 × 400 metres relay	Jamaica	3:55.4	Bermuda	3:55.6	Trinidad and Tobago; Carol Charles; Janice Bernard; Ann Adams; Jennifer Augustine	4:11.1

=== Boys under 17 (Youth) ===
Event	Gold		Silver		Bronze	
100 metres	Rickey Moxey (BAH)	10.7	Ashton Pitt (JAM)	11.0	Eric Berrie (BAR)	11.4
200 metres	Rickey Moxey (BAH)	22.1	Eric Berrie (BAR)	22.8	Norman Allen (JAM)	23.0
400 metres	Norman Allen (JAM)	51.9	Eric Berrie (BAR)	52.6	Michael Swan (BER)	55.1

=== Girls under 17 (Youth) ===
Event	Gold		Silver		Bronze	
100 metres	Esther Hope (TRI)	12.3	Verone Webber (JAM)	12.3	Josephine James (GUY)	12.9
200 metres	Verone Webber (JAM)	25.5	Esther Hope (TRI)	25.8	Josephine James (GUY)	26.5
400 metres	Verone Webber (JAM)	58.0	Vivienne Richards (BER)	60.4	Beverley Crawford (JAM)	60.7

== Medal table (unofficial) ==
* Host nation (Bermuda)

Rank	Nation	Gold	Silver	Bronze	Total
1	Bermuda*	14	12	5	31
2	Jamaica	8	10	12	30
3	Barbados	5	8	7	20
4	Trinidad and Tobago	5	3	5	13
5	Bahamas	3	3	2	8
6	Guyana	1	0	4	5
Totals (6 entries)		36	36	35	107
