= Janice Bernard =

Trinidad and Tobago sprinter

Personal information
- Nationality: Trinidad and Tobago
- Born: 30 October 1958 (age 66)
- Height: 1.62 m (5 ft 4 in)
- Weight: 58 kg (128 lb)

Sport
- Sport: Sprinting
- Event: 4 × 100 metres relay

Janice Bernard (born 30 October 1958) is a Trinidad and Tobago sprinter. She competed in the women's 4 × 100 metres relay at the 1984 Summer Olympics.

Her personal best in the 100 metres is 11.3 set in 1979.

== International competitions ==
Year	Competition	Venue	Position	Event	Notes
Representing Trinidad and Tobago
1973	CARIFTA Games (U20)	Port of Spain, Trinidad and Tobago	2nd	4 × 100 m relay	47.5
1974	CARIFTA Games (U20)	Kingston, Jamaica	7th	100 m	12.8
1974	Central American and Caribbean; Junior Championships (U20)	Maracaibo, Venezuela	4th	100 m	12.22 (w)
1974	Central American and Caribbean; Junior Championships (U20)	Maracaibo, Venezuela	2nd	4 × 100 m relay	47.07
1975	CARIFTA Games (U20)	Hamilton, Bermuda	3rd	100 m	11.8 (w)
1975	CARIFTA Games (U20)	Hamilton, Bermuda	2nd	4 × 100 m relay	48.1
1975	CARIFTA Games (U20)	Hamilton, Bermuda	3rd	4 × 400 m relay	4:11.1
1975	Central American and Caribbean Championships	Ponce, Puerto Rico	3rd	4 × 100 m relay	47.4
1977	Central American and Caribbean Championships	Xalapa, Mexico	3rd	4 × 100 m relay	47.20
1978	Central American and Caribbean Games	Medellín, Colombia	4th	100 m	11.94
1978	Central American and Caribbean Games	Medellín, Colombia	2nd	200 m	24.01
1978	Central American and Caribbean Games	Medellín, Colombia	3rd	4 × 100 m relay	45.13
1978	Commonwealth Games	Edmonton, Canada	16th (h)	100 m	11.78
1978	Commonwealth Games	Edmonton, Canada	18th (h)	200 m	23.96
1978	Commonwealth Games	Edmonton, Canada	6th	4 × 100 m relay	45.80
1982	Central American and Caribbean Games	Havana, Cuba	2nd	100 m	11.57
1982	Central American and Caribbean Games	Havana, Cuba	5th	200 m	24.08
1982	Central American and Caribbean Games	Havana, Cuba	1st	4 × 100 m relay	44.86
1982	Commonwealth Games	Brisbane, Australia	13th (sf)	100 m	11.61
1982	Commonwealth Games	Brisbane, Australia	6th	4 × 100 m relay	44.74
1983	Pan American Games	San Juan, Puerto Rico	6th	100 m	11.73
1983	Pan American Games	San Juan, Puerto Rico	2nd	4 × 100 m relay	44.63
1983	Pan American Games	San Juan, Puerto Rico	4th	4 × 400 m relay	3:37.36
1984	Olympic Games	Los Angeles, United States	7th	4 × 100 m relay	44.23
