= Athletics at the 1983 Summer Universiade – Women's 4 × 100 metres relay =

The women's 4 × 100 metres relay event at the 1983 Summer Universiade was held at the Commonwealth Stadium in Edmonton on 11 July 1983.

== Results ==
Rank	Nation	Athletes	Time	Notes
1st place, gold medalist(s)	United States	LaShon Nedd, Jackie Washington, Brenda Cliette, Randy Givens	42.82	
2nd place, silver medalist(s)	Canada	Angella Taylor, Tanya Brothers, Marita Payne, Molly Killingbeck	43.21	
3rd place, bronze medalist(s)	Soviet Union	Marina Romanova, Marina Molokova, Irina Olkhovnikova, Olga Antonova	44.20	
4	Italy	Carla Mercurio, Daniela Ferrian, Giuseppina Cirulli, Erica Rossi	44.36	
5	Jamaica	Elsia Thomas, Grace Jackson, Karen Bowen, Frederica Wright	45.21	
	France	Laurence Bily, Laurence Pays-Labrousse, Françoise Philippe, Marie-France Mollex	DQ	
