= Athletics at the 1982 Commonwealth Games – Women's 4 × 400 metres relay =

Women's 4 × 400 metres relay at the Commonwealth Games

The women's 4 × 400 metres relay event at the 1982 Commonwealth Games was held on 9 October at the QE II Stadium in Brisbane, Australia.

== Results ==
Rank	Nation	Athletes	Time	Notes
1st place, gold medalist(s)	Canada	Charmaine Crooks, Jillian Richardson, Molly Killingbeck, Angella Taylor	3:27.70	
2nd place, silver medalist(s)	Australia	Leanne Evans, Denise Boyd, Debbie Flintoff, Raelene Boyle	3:27.72	
3rd place, bronze medalist(s)	Scotland	Sandra Whittaker, Anne Clarkson, Angela Bridgeman, Linsey MacDonald	3:32.92	
4	England	Yvette Wray, Gladys Taylor, Kathy Smallwood, Joslyn Hoyte-Smith	3:35.35	
5	Wales	Carmen Smart, Kirsty McDermott, Diane Fryar, Michelle Scutt	3:35.76	
6	New Zealand	Terry Genge, Christine Hughes, Janine Robson, Kim Robertson	3:40.63	
7	Kenya	Ruth Atuti, Alice Adala, Rose Tata-Muya, Ruth Waithera	3:40.77	
