= Esmeralda de Jesus Garcia =

Brazilian long and triple jumper

Esmeralda Garcia
Personal information
- Full name: Esmeralda de Jesus Freitas Garcia Silami
- Born: February 16, 1959 (age 67) Sete Lagoas, Brazil
- Height: 1.62 m (5 ft 4 in)
- Weight: 52 kg (115 lb)

Sport
- Sport: Athletics
Medal record
Women's Athletics
Representing Brazil
Pan American Games
Gold medal – first place	1983 Caracas	100 metres
South American Youth Championships
Gold medal – first place	1975 Quito	100 m
Silver medal – second place	1975 Quito	4x100 m relay
Bronze medal – third place	1975 Quito	200 m
- Updated on 7 May 2013

Esmeralda de Jesus Freitas Garcia Silami (born February 16, 1959) is a retired long and triple jumper from Brazil, who also competed in the sprint events. A two-time Olympian she is best known for setting the (non-ratified) world record in the women's triple jump on June 5, 1986, in Indianapolis: 13.68 metres.

Representing the Florida State Seminoles track and field team, de Jesus Garcia won the 1985 NCAA Division I Outdoor Track and Field Championships in the triple jump.

== International competitions ==
Representing Brazil
Year	Competition	Venue	Position	Event	Notes
1974	South American Junior Championships	Lima, Peru	2nd	100 m	11.8 s
1974	South American Junior Championships	Lima, Peru	5th	200 m	25.3 s
1974	South American Junior Championships	Lima, Peru	3rd	4 × 100 m relay	47.9 s
1975	South American Youth Championships	Quito, Ecuador	1st	100 m	11.7 s
1975	South American Youth Championships	Quito, Ecuador	3rd	200 m	24.5 s
1975	South American Youth Championships	Quito, Ecuador	2nd	4 × 100 m relay	48.1 s
1976	Olympic Games	Montreal, Canada	28th (qf)	100 m	11.77 s
1976	South American Junior Championships	Maracaibo, Venezuela	1st	100 m	11.58 s
1976	South American Junior Championships	Maracaibo, Venezuela	1st	200 m	24.52 s
1976	South American Junior Championships	Maracaibo, Venezuela	1st	4 × 100 m relay	46.66 s
1976	South American Junior Championships	Maracaibo, Venezuela	3rd	Long jump	5.68 m
1979	South American Championships	Bucaramanga, Colombia	3rd	100 m	11.8 s
1979	South American Championships	Bucaramanga, Colombia	3rd	200 m	24.1 s
1979	South American Championships	Bucaramanga, Colombia	2nd	4 × 100 m relay	46.1 s
1983	Universiade	Edmonton, Canada	10th (sf)	100 m	11.65 s
1983	Universiade	Edmonton, Canada	12th	Long jump	5.87 m
1983	World Championships	Helsinki, Finland	23rd (qf)	100 m	11.64 s
1983	World Championships	Helsinki, Finland	17th (q)	Long jump	6.15 m
1983	Pan American Games	Caracas, Venezuela	1st	100 m	11.31 s
1983	Pan American Games	Caracas, Venezuela	6th	Long jump	6.18 m
1983	Ibero-American Championships	Barcelona, Spain	1st	100m	11.67 s
1983	Ibero-American Championships	Barcelona, Spain	4th	Long jump	5.97 m
1983	South American Championships	Santa Fe, Argentina	1st	100 m	11.6 s
1983	South American Championships	Santa Fe, Argentina	1st	4 × 100 m relay	45.4 s
1983	South American Championships	Santa Fe, Argentina	1st	Long jump	6.12 2
1984	Olympic Games	Los Angeles, United States	18th (qf)	100 m	11.82 s
1984	Olympic Games	Los Angeles, United States	19th (q)	Long jump	6.01 m

== Personal bests ==
Outdoor

- 100 metres – 11.31 (-2.7 m/s, Caracas 1983)
- 200 metres – 23.61 (Houston 1985)
- Long jump – 6.57 (-0.7 m/s, Austin 1985)

Records
Preceded by (United States) Wendy Brown	Women's Triple Jump World Record Holder; Not officially ratified by the IAAF; 1986-06-05 – 1987-05-02	Succeeded by (United States) Wendy Brown
