= June Griffith =

Guyanese track and field athlete

Personal information
- Born: June 16, 1957 (age 69) Santa Rosa, Guyana
Medal record
Women's athletics
Representing Guyana
Central American and Caribbean Games
Gold medal – first place	1982 Havana	400 m
Pan American Games
Silver medal – second place	1979 San Juan	400 m
Commonwealth Games
Bronze medal – third place	1978 Edmonton	Long jump
Representing Americas
IAAF World Cup
Bronze medal – third place	1981 Rome	4×400 m relay

June Marcia Griffith (married Collison) (born June 16, 1957) is a retired Guyanese track and field athlete. She participated in both sprint and jumping events. She represented Guyana in the 400 meters at the 1984 Olympics, making it to the semi-final round before finishing a non-qualifying 5th place in her semi final behind the eventual gold (Valerie Brisco-Hooks) and bronze (Kathy Smallwood-Cook) medalists.

She was the 400 metres gold medalist at the 1982 Central American and Caribbean Games. She was also a silver medalist at the 1979 Pan American Games, losing to Sharon Dabney in a photo finish in the 400 metres and a bronze medalist in the long jump at the 1978 Commonwealth Games.

She married Dennis Collison, also a Guyanese sprinter. They are the parents of NBA basketball player Darren Collison. She originally came to the United States on a track scholarship to Adelphi University. After earning her MBA, she was CFO for the now closed St. Luke Medical Center in Sierra Madre, California. She is now COO of the Arrowhead Regional Medical Center.

== International competitions ==
Year	Competition	Venue	Position	Event	Notes
Representing Guyana
1973	CARIFTA Games (U20)	Port of Spain, Trinidad and Tobago	3rd	Long jump	5.35
1974	Central American and Caribbean Games	Santo Domingo, Dominican Republic	13th (h)	400 m	1:35.71
1974	Central American and Caribbean Games	Santo Domingo, Dominican Republic	5th	High jump	1.59 m
1974	Central American and Caribbean Games	Santo Domingo, Dominican Republic	5th	Long jump	5.28 m
1975	CARIFTA Games (U20)	Hamilton, Bermuda	1st	High jump	1.625 m
1976	CARIFTA Games (U20)	Nassau, Bahamas	1st	High jump	1.65 m
1976	CARIFTA Games (U20)	Nassau, Bahamas	2nd	Long jump	5.66 m
1978	Commonwealth Games	Edmonton, Canada	7th (sf)	200 m	23.44 (w)
1978	Commonwealth Games	Edmonton, Canada	5th	400 m	53.25
1978	Commonwealth Games	Edmonton, Canada	3rd	Long jump	6.52 m
1979	Pan American Games	San Juan, Puerto Rico	2nd	400 m	51.81
1979	World Cup	Montreal, Canada	5th	4 × 400 m relay	3:28.50^{1}
1981	World Cup	Rome, Italy	3rd	4 × 400 m relay	3:26.42^{1}
1982	Central American and Caribbean Games	Havana, Cuba	1st	400 m	51.89
1982	Commonwealth Games	Brisbane, Australia	8th	400 m	53.67
1983	Pan American Games	Caracas, Venezuela	5th	400 m	53.14
1983	World Championships	Helsinki, Finland	19th (h)	400 m	53.47
1984	Olympic Games	Los Angeles, United States	13th (sf)	400 m	52.39

^{1}Representing the Americas
