= Colin Bradford =

Jamaican sprinter (born 1955)

Medal record

Men's athletics

Representing Jamaica

Commonwealth Games
Silver medal – second place	1978 Edmonton	4x400m Relay
Bronze medal – third place	1978 Edmonton	200 m
Bronze medal – third place	1978 Edmonton	4x100m Relay

CAC Championships
Gold medal – first place	1979 Guadalajara	400 m
Gold medal – first place	1981 Santo Domingo	100 m

CARIFTA Games
Bronze medal – third place	1974 Kingston	100 m
Bronze medal – third place	1974 Kingston	200 m

Colin Bradford (born 30 May 1955) is a Jamaican former track and field athlete who specialised in sprinting events. He represented Jamaica at the Olympic Games in 1976 and 1980.

Born in Saint Catherine, he gained his first honours at the 1974 CARIFTA Games, where in the under-20s section he claimed bronze medals over 100 metres and 200 metres. He was selected to contest these events at the 1976 Summer Olympics – he reached the 200 m final, coming in seventh, while his teammate Don Quarrie took the gold medal. Bradford also ran in the 4×400 metres relay and came fifth in the final alongside Quarrie, Leighton Priestley and Seymour Newman. He represented Jamaica at the 1978 Commonwealth Games and secured the 200 m bronze medal.

Competing for the USC Trojans track and field team, Bradford won the 1979 NCAA Division I Outdoor Track and Field Championships in the 4 × 100 m relay.

He competed over 400 metres individually and in the relay at the 1979 Central American and Caribbean Championships in Athletics and took gold medals in both events. Bradford was chosen for the 200 m as well as both the 100 and 400 m relays at the 1980 Moscow Olympics, but was eliminated in the heats stages of all three events. The following year he won the 100 m title at the 1981 Central American and Caribbean Championships in Athletics and formed part of the Americas 4×400 m relay team for the 1981 IAAF World Cup. His final global competition was the 1983 World Championships in Athletics, where he ran in the heats of the 200 m and anchored a Jamaican team of George Walcott, Ray Stewart and Leroy Reid to seventh place in the 4×100 metres relay final.

His personal bests were 10.15 seconds for 100 m, 20.66 over 200 m and a 400 m time of 45.94 seconds.

== Major competition record ==
Year	Competition	Venue	Position	Notes
1976	Olympic Games	Montreal, Canada	7th (q-finals)	100 m
1976	Olympic Games	Montreal, Canada	7th	200 m
1976	Olympic Games	Montreal, Canada	5th	4 × 400 m relay
1978	Commonwealth Games	Edmonton, Canada	3rd	200 m
1979	CAC Championships	Guadalajara, Mexico	1st	400 m
1980	Olympic Games	Moscow, Soviet Union	6th (q-finals)	200 m
1980	Olympic Games	Moscow, Soviet Union	4th (heats)	4 × 100 m relay
1980	Olympic Games	Moscow, Soviet Union	5th	4 × 400 m relay
1981	CAC Championships	Santo Domingo, Dominican Republic	1st	100 m
1981	World Cup	Rome, Italy	3rd	4 × 400 m relay
1983	World Championships	Helsinki, Finland	7th (heats)	200 m
1983	World Championships	Helsinki, Finland	5th (heats)	4 × 100 m relay
