= María Ángeles Cato =

Personal information
- Birth name: María de los Ángeles Cato Ramírez
- Born: 2 August 1956 (age 68)

Sport
- Sport: Athletics
- Event: Pentathlon

María de los Ángeles Cato Ramírez (born 2 August 1956) is a retired Mexican athlete who competed in the pentathlon. She won several medals at regional level. In addition, she represented her country at two editions of the Pan American Games, in 1975 and 1979.

== International competitions ==
Year	Competition	Venue	Position	Event	Notes
Representing Mexico
1974	Central American and Caribbean Games	Santo Domingo, Dominican Republic	5th	100 m hurdles	15.10 s
1974	Central American and Caribbean Games	Santo Domingo, Dominican Republic	3rd	4 × 100 m relay	48.02
1974	Central American and Caribbean Games	Santo Domingo, Dominican Republic	5th	Pentathlon	3633 pts
1974	Central American and Caribbean Junior Championships	Maracaibo, Venezuela	1st	100 m hurdles	14.57 s
1974	Central American and Caribbean Junior Championships	Maracaibo, Venezuela	3rd	4 × 400 m relay	3:55.27
1974	Central American and Caribbean Junior Championships	Maracaibo, Venezuela	1st	Pentathlon	3717 pts
1975	Central American and Caribbean Championships	Ponce, Puerto Rico	1st	Pentathlon	3796 pts
1975	Pan American Games	Mexico City, Mexico	10th (h)	100 m hurdles	15.09 s
1975	Pan American Games	Mexico City, Mexico	8th (q)	Long jump	5.59 m^{1}
1975	Pan American Games	Mexico City, Mexico	7th	Pentathlon	3941 pts
1979	Central American and Caribbean Championships	Guadalajara, Mexico	1st	Pentathlon	3907 pts
1979	Pan American Games	San Juan, Puerto Rico	12th (h)	100 m hurdles	14.66 s
1979	Pan American Games	San Juan, Puerto Rico	7th	Pentathlon	3782 pts

^{1}Did not start in the final.
