= Esther Hope-Washington =

Trinidad and Tobago sprinter

Personal information
- Nationality: Trinidad and Tobago
- Born: 9 July 1960 (age 65) Port of Spain, Trinidad and Tobago
- Height: 1.70 m (5 ft 7 in)
- Weight: 64 kg (141 lb)

Sport
- Sport: Sprinting
- Event: 100 metres

Esther Hope-Washington (born 9 July 1960) is a Trinidad and Tobago sprinter. She competed in the women's 4 × 100 metres relay at the 1984 Summer Olympics.

== International competitions ==
| Year | Competition | Venue | Position | Event | Notes |
Representing Trinidad and Tobago
| 1974 | CARIFTA Games (U17) | Kingston, Jamaica | 2nd | 100 m | 12.7 |
| 1974 | CARIFTA Games (U17) | Kingston, Jamaica | 2nd | 200 m | 25.4 |
| 1974 | Central American and Caribbean; Junior Championships (U20) | Maracaibo, Venezuela | 2nd | 100 m | 12.04 |
| 1974 | Central American and Caribbean; Junior Championships (U20) | Maracaibo, Venezuela | 2nd | 4 × 100 m relay | 47.07 |
| 1975 | CARIFTA Games (U17) | Hamilton, Bermuda | 1st | 100 m | 12.3 |
| 1975 | CARIFTA Games (U17) | Hamilton, Bermuda | 2nd | 200 m | 25.8 |
| 1975 | CARIFTA Games (U17) | Hamilton, Bermuda | 2nd | 4 × 100 m relay (U20) | 48.1 |
| 1975 | Central American and Caribbean Championships | Ponce, Puerto Rico | 3rd | 4 × 100 m relay | 47.4 |
| 1975 | Pan American Games | Mexico City, Mexico | 16th (sf) | 100 m | 12.32 |
| 1975 | Pan American Games | Mexico City, Mexico | 7th | 4 × 100 m relay | 45.56 |
| 1976 | CARIFTA Games (U17) | Nassau, Bahamas | 3rd | 100 m | 12.5 |
| 1976 | CARIFTA Games (U17) | Nassau, Bahamas | 1st | 200 m | 25.3 |
| 1976 | Central American and Caribbean; Junior Championships (U17) | Xalapa, Mexico | 1st | 100 m | 11.90 |
| 1977 | CARIFTA Games | Bridgetown, Barbados | 4th | 100 m | 12.15 |
| 1977 | Central American and Caribbean Championships | Xalapa, Mexico | 3rd | 4 × 100 m relay | 47.20 |
| 1978 | CARIFTA Games | Nassau, Bahamas | 3rd | 100 m | 12.02 (w) |
| 1978 | Central American and Caribbean Games | Medellín, Colombia | 3rd | 4 × 100 m relay | 45.13 |
| 1978 | Commonwealth Games | Edmonton, Canada | 16th (sf) | 100 m | 11.82 |
| 1978 | Commonwealth Games | Edmonton, Canada | 20th (h) | 200 m | 24.19 |
| 1978 | Commonwealth Games | Edmonton, Canada | 6th | 4 × 100 m relay | 45.80 |
| 1983 | World Championships | Helsinki, Finland | 34th (h) | 100 m | 12.19 |
| 1983 | Pan American Games | San Juan, Puerto Rico | 5th | 100 m | 11.63 |
| 1983 | Pan American Games | San Juan, Puerto Rico | 2nd | 4 × 100 m relay | 44.63 |
| 1984 | Olympic Games | Los Angeles, United States | 7th | 4 × 100 m relay | 44.23 |

== Personal bests ==
- 100 metres – 11.50 (1982)
