= Natalya German =

Ukrainian track and field sprinter

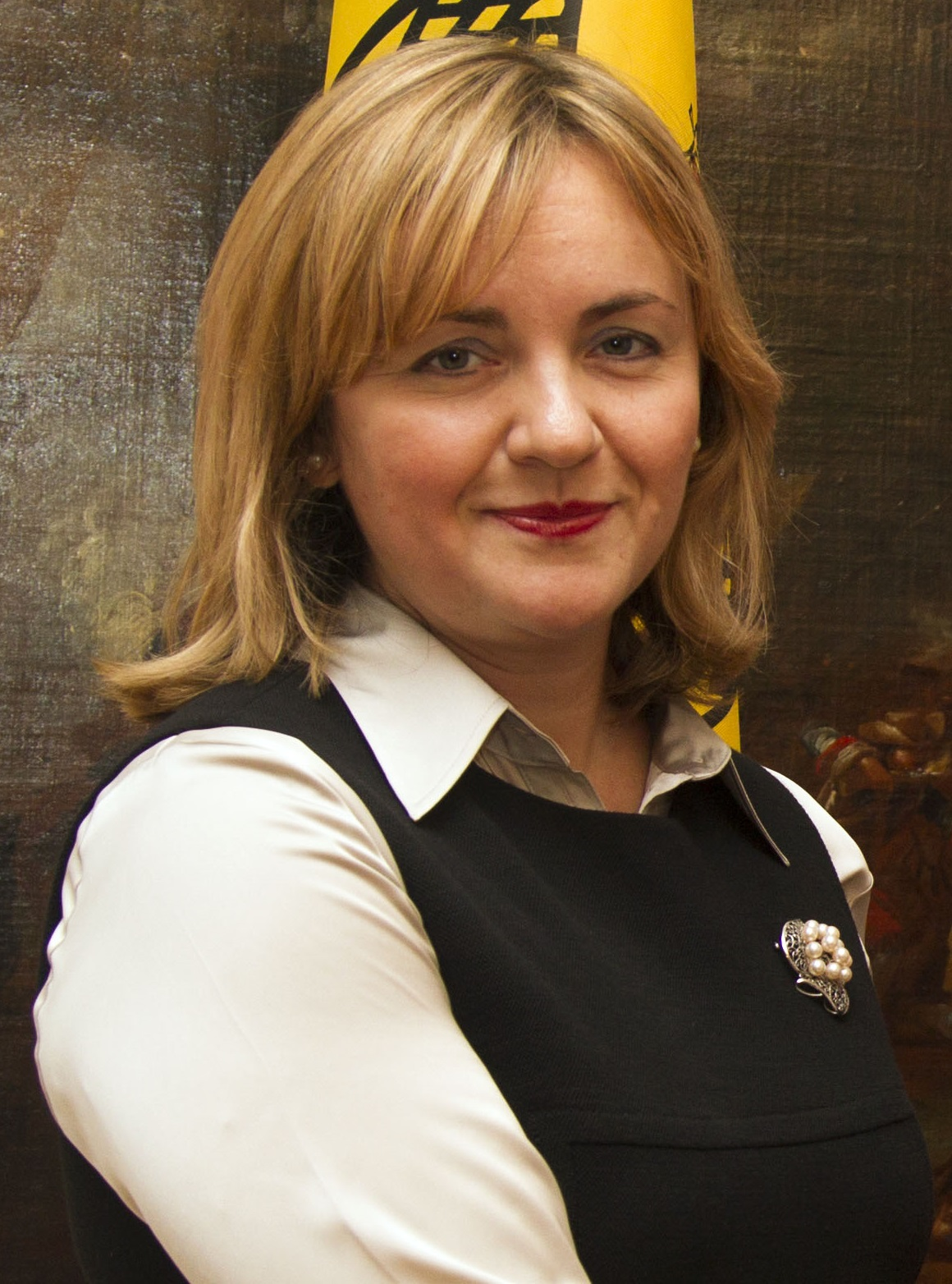
- German in 2012

Medal record

Women's athletics

Representing the Soviet Union

World Championships
| Bronze medal – third place | 1987 Rome | 4×100 m relay |

Natalya German (Russian: Наталья Герман; born 10 November 1963) is a Ukrainian former track and field sprinter who competed for the Soviet Union.

Born in Dniprodzerzhynsk, Ukrainian SSR, she had a very brief period of success in sprinting. In 1987 she won the 200 metres at the Soviet Athletics Championships with a time of 23.25 seconds. This was the slowest winning recorded at the competition after the introduction of fully automatic timing equipment. However, she achieved a much quicker personal best in Chelyabinsk that year of 22.47 seconds. This ranked her as the 13th fastest in the world for the discipline that year.

German's sole appearance at a major athletics competition came at the 1987 World Championships in Athletics. She did not perform well individually, being eliminated in the first round as the fastest non-qualifier. Success awaited her in the relay, however, as she ran the curve leg in a Soviet women's team including Irina Slyusar, Natalya Pomoshchnikova, and Olga Antonova. The team ended up a clear third place behind the American and East German women.

== National titles ==
- Soviet Athletics Championships
  - 200 metres: 1987

== International competitions ==
| Year | Competition | Venue | Position | Event | Notes |
|---|---|---|---|---|---|
| 1987 | World Championships | Rome, Italy | 17th | 200 m | 23.26 |
| 1987 | World Championships | Rome, Italy | 3rd | 4 × 100 m relay | 42.33 |
