= Athletics at the 1983 Pan American Games – Women's 100 metres =

Women's 100 metres at the Pan American Games

The women's 100 metres event at the 1983 Pan American Games was held in Caracas, Venezuela on 23 and 24 August.

== Medalists ==
| Gold | Silver | Bronze |
|---|---|---|
| Esmeralda de Jesus Garcia; Brazil | Jackie Washington; United States | Luisa Ferrer; Cuba |

== Results ==
=== Heats ===
Wind:
Heat 1: -0.7 m/s

| Rank | Heat | Name | Nationality | Time | Notes |
|---|---|---|---|---|---|
| 1 | 1 | Luisa Ferrer | Cuba | 11.58 | Q |
| 2 | 1 | Lisa Hopkins | United States | 11.73 | Q |
| 3 | 1 | Esther Hope | Trinidad and Tobago | 11.83 | Q |
| 3 | 2 | Esmeralda de Jesus Garcia | Brazil | 11.83 | Q |
| 5 | 1 | Shonel Ferguson | Bahamas | 11.88 | q |
| 6 | 2 | Jackie Washington | United States | 11.89 | Q |
| 7 | 2 | Janice Bernard | Trinidad and Tobago | 12.03 | Q |
| 8 | 1 | Adriana Pero | Argentina | 12.14 | q |
| 9 | 2 | Nilsa Paris | Puerto Rico | 12.15 | |
| 10 | 2 | Susana Armenteros | Cuba | 12.17 | |
| 11 | 1 | Glennis Báez | Venezuela | 12.38 | |
| 12 | 2 | Yaneris Guerra | Venezuela | 12.85 | |
| | 2 | Ruperta Charles | Antigua and Barbuda | DNS | |

=== Final ===
Wind: -2.7 m/s

| Rank | Lane | Name | Nationality | Time | Notes |
|---|---|---|---|---|---|
| 1st place, gold medalist(s) | 6 | Esmeralda de Jesus Garcia | Brazil | 11.31 | |
| 2nd place, silver medalist(s) | 2 | Jackie Washington | United States | 11.33 | |
| 3rd place, bronze medalist(s) | 4 | Luisa Ferrer | Cuba | 11.38 | |
| 4 | 7 | Shonel Ferguson | Bahamas | 11.62 | |
| 5 | 5 | Esther Hope | Trinidad and Tobago | 11.63 | |
| 6 | 8 | Janice Bernard | Trinidad and Tobago | 11.73 | |
| 7 | 1 | Adriana Pero | Argentina | 12.09 | |
| | 3 | Lisa Hopkins | United States | DNS | |
