= Ena Guevara =

Peruvian long-distance runner

Personal information
- Full name: Ena Guevara Mora-Weinstein
- Nationality: Peru
- Born: February 7, 1959 (age 67) Ica, Ica Region
- Height: 1.65 m (5 ft 5 in)
- Weight: 50 kg (110 lb)

Sport
- Sport: Athletics
Medal record
Women's athletics
Representing Peru
South American Games
Silver medal – second place	1990 Lima	5,000 m
Silver medal – second place	1990 Lima	10,000 m
South American Youth Championships
Silver medal – second place	1975 Quito	600 m
- Updated on 7 May 2013

Ena Guevara Mora Weinstein (born February 7, 1959, in Ica) is a retired female long-distance runner from Peru.

== Career ==
She competed for her native country at the 1984 Summer Olympics in Los Angeles, California. There she ended up in 35th place in the women's marathon. Guevara set her personal best in the classic distance (2:41.48) in 1992, when she also competed at the 1992 Summer Olympics. She finished fifth in the marathon at the 1987 Pan American Games, and 10th at the 1987 Boston Marathon.

Guevara competed for the FIU Panthers track and field and St. Thomas Bobcats track and field teams in the U.S. NCAA Division I and NCAA Division II respectively.

== Personal life ==
Mora married North Miami triathlete Mitch Weinstein in May 1987.

== Achievements ==
Year	Competition	Venue	Position	Event	Notes
Representing Peru
1975	South American Youth Championships	Quito, Ecuador	2nd	600 m	1:41.4 min A
1983	Ibero-American Championships	Barcelona, Spain	6th	1500 m	4:31.72
1983	Ibero-American Championships	Barcelona, Spain	4th	3000 m	9:34.22
1984	Olympic Games	Los Angeles, United States	35th	Marathon	2:46:50 hrs
1987	World Indoor Championships	Indianapolis, United States	10th	3000 m	9:35.64 min
1987	Pan American Games	Indianapolis, United States	5th	Marathon	3:01:04 hrs
1990	South American Games	Lima, Peru	2nd	5,000 m	9:58.2
1990	South American Games	Lima, Peru	2nd	10,000 m	36.04.80 min
1991	World Championships	Tokyo, Japan	19th	Marathon	2:48:53 hrs
1992	Olympic Games	Barcelona, Spain	34th	Marathon	3:05:50 hrs
