= Colleen Pekin =

Australian sprinter

Colleen Pekin (born 10 July 1957) is an Australian former sprinter.

She won 3 bronze medals at the Commonwealth Games: the 200 metres in 1978, the 4 x 100 metres relay in 1978, and the 100 metres in 1982.

She was initially selected for the 1980 Moscow Olympics, before being dropped. She retired from racing in 1983 to start a family.

Her daughter Lyndsay Pekin competed as a sprinter and hurdler at the 2014 Commonwealth Games.
