= Athletics at the 1987 Summer Universiade – Women's 4 × 100 metres relay =

The women's 4 × 100 metres relay event at the 1987 Summer Universiade was held at the Stadion Maksimir in Zagreb on 19 July 1987.

== Results ==
Rank	Nation	Athletes	Time	Notes
1st place, gold medalist(s)	United States	Wendy Vereen, Jackie Washington, Dannette Young, Gwen Torrence	42.90	
2nd place, silver medalist(s)	Soviet Union	Nadezhda Roshchupkina, Natalya Pomoshchnikova, Yelena Vinogradova, Irina Slyusar	43.17	
3rd place, bronze medalist(s)	Nigeria	Tina Iheagwam, Lynda Eseimokumoh, Mary Onyali, Falilat Ogunkoya	43.71	
4	France	Florence Colle, Marie-José Hontas, Martine Cassin, Magali Seguin	43.90	
5	Cuba	Idania Pino, Aliuska López, Susana Armenteros, Eusebia Riquelme	44.06	
6	Italy	Rita Angotzi, Annarita Balzani, Marisa Masullo, Annalisa Gambelli	44.82	
