= Athletics at the 1990 South American Games =

Athletics at the IV South American Games
- Dates: December 6–9
- Host city: Lima, Perú (Peru)
- Venue: Estadio Nacional
- Level: Senior
- Events: 42 (23 men, 19 women)

Athletics events at the 1990 South American Games were held at the Estadio Atlético de San Luis next to the Estadio Nacional in Lima, Perú, between December 6-9, 1990. A total of 42 events were contested, 23 by men and 19 by women.

== Medal summary ==
Medal winners were published in a book by written Argentinian journalist Ernesto Rodríguez III with support of the Argentine Olympic Committee (Spanish: Comité Olímpico Argentino) under the auspices of the Ministry of Education (Spanish: Ministerio de Educación de la Nación) in collaboration with the Office of Sports (Spanish: Secretaría de Deporte de la Nación). Eduardo Biscayart supplied the list of winners and their results. More results were assembled from other sources.

=== Men ===
Event	Gold		Silver		Bronze	
100 metres (wind: -1.0 m/s)	Roberto Marshall; Chile	10.81	Miguel Bernal; Peru	10.83	Carlos Gats; Argentina	10.84
200 metres	Carlos Gats; Argentina	22.28	Jorge Cañizales; Venezuela	22.56	Roberto Marshall; Chile	22.65
400 metres	Carlos Morales; Chile	48.30	Hernán Hevia; Chile	48.60	José Zambrano; Venezuela	48.80
800 metres	Edwin Lobatón; Bolivia	1:56.2	Manuel Bravo; Ecuador	1:56.3	Daniel Loayza; Peru	1:56.7
1500 metres	José Carrasco; Chile	3:56.10	Miguel Meza; Chile	3:58.30	Edwin Lobatón; Bolivia	3:59.70
5000 metres	José Carrasco; Chile	14:10.4	Silvio Guerra; Ecuador	14:10.8	Luis Nempo; Chile	14:19.1
10,000 metres	Silvio Guerra; Ecuador	29:59.7	Néstor Jami; Ecuador	30:02.2	José Castillo; Peru	30:10.4
Marathon	Waldemar Cotelo; Uruguay	2:18:47	Edwin Calatayud; Bolivia	2:20:50	José Jami; Ecuador	2:24:00
110 metres hurdles	Marco Mina; Peru	14.84	Arturo Rodríguez; Chile	15.03	Fernando Valiente; Peru	15.48
400 metres hurdles	Marco Mina; Peru	52.6	Nicolás Majluf; Chile	54.9	Luis Page; Peru	55.2
3000 metres steeplechase	Miguel Meza; Chile	9:01.8	Eddy Punica; Ecuador	9:04.2	Silviano Simeón; Peru	9:16.7
4 x 100 metres relay	Peru; Moisés Del Castillo; Miguel Bernal; José Uribe; Óscar Fernández	41.0	Chile; Roberto Marshall; Carlos Morales; Carlos Bernardo Moreno; Juan Francisco Cobo	41.3	Bolivia; Jorge Castellón; Marco Ortiz; Vladimir Aponte; Miguel Mercado	41.9
4 x 400 metres relay	Chile; Roberto Marshall; Nicolas Majluf; Hernán Hevia; Carlos Morales	3:16.70	Peru; Marco Mina; Aldo Consiglieri; Pedro Velarde; Ramiro Quintana	3:18.20	Ecuador; Fernando Espinosa; Dick Perlaza; Aurelio Mancheno; Manuel Bravo	3:18.22
20 Kilometres Walk	Luis Rodríguez; Ecuador	1:45:13	Carlos Montalbán; Ecuador	1:46:26	Sergio Quispe; Peru	1:46:53
High jump	Fernando Moreno; Argentina	2.15	Hugo Muñoz; Peru	2.12	Valery Abugattas; Peru	2.06
Pole vault	Konstantín Zagustín; Venezuela	5.15	Cristián Aspillaga; Chile	4.90	Oscar Veit; Argentina	4.70
Long jump	Joan Moeckel; Chile	7.67	Ricardo Valiente; Peru	7.56	Fernando Valiente; Peru	7.33
Triple jump	Ricardo Valiente; Peru	16.47	Alfredo Audain; Venezuela	16.27	Oscar Valiente; Peru	15.48
Shot put	Gert Weil; Chile	18.32	Andrés Charadía; Argentina	15.24	Marcelo Pugliese; Argentina	14.76
Discus throw	Andrés Solo; Chile	47.20	Andrés Charadía; Argentina	47.10	Marcelo Pugliese; Argentina	46.70
Hammer throw	Andrés Charadía; Argentina	69.94 AR	Marcelo Pugliese; Argentina	58.74	Rubén Torres; Ecuador	54.78
Javelin throw	Pedro Claure; Chile	66.14	Edgar Baumann; Paraguay	64.40	Jorge Parraguirre; Chile	62.74
Decathlon	Moisés Del Castillo; Peru	5717	Álvaro Fernández; Peru	5160		

=== Women ===
Event	Gold		Silver		Bronze	
100 metres (wind: -1.1 m/s)	Marbelis Barriga; Venezuela	12.18	Claudia Acerenza; Uruguay	12.20	Lisette Rondón; Chile	12.29
200 metres	Olga Conte; Argentina	25.24	Claudia Acerenza; Uruguay	25.75	Lisette Rondón; Chile	26.00
400 metres	Olga Conte; Argentina	55.03	Claudia Acerenza; Uruguay	55.22	Ismenia Guzmán; Chile	55.64
800 metres	Letitia Vriesde; Suriname	2:06.2	Adriana Martínez; Ecuador	2:11.2	Ismenia Guzmán; Chile	2:12.1
1500 metres	Letitia Vriesde; Suriname	4:23.0	Janeth Caizalitin; Ecuador	4:32.0	Niusha Mansilla; Bolivia	4:37.4
3000 metres	Yolanda Quimbita; Ecuador	9:50.7	Ena Guevara; Peru	9:58.2	Marisol Cossio; Bolivia	10:14.5
10,000 metres	Yolanda Quimbita; Ecuador	35:40.4	Ena Guevara; Peru	36:04.80	Mónica Tapia; Ecuador	36:09.8
Marathon	Graciela Caizabanda; Ecuador	2:56:44	Elsa Pizarro; Chile	3:10:16	Florinda Tamayo; Peru	3:14:01
100 metres hurdles	Carmen Bezanilla; Chile	13.96	Débora De Souza; Peru	15.39	Michelle Openshaw; Peru	15.39
400 metres hurdles	Liliana Chalá; Ecuador	59.8	Inés Justet; Uruguay	60.4	Carmen Bezanilla; Chile	61.2
4 x 100 metres relay	Uruguay; Marcela Tiscornia; Soledad Acerenza; Laura Abel; Claudia Acerenza	47.19	Bolivia; Jacqueline Solíz; Elizabeth Arteaga; Ana María Luzio; Sandra Antela	48.72	Peru; Ana Atencio; Rocío de la Cruz; Debora De Souza; Cecilia Zereceda	48.93
4 x 400 metres relay	Uruguay; Inés Justet; Marcela Tiscornia; Laura Abel; Claudia Acerenza	3:44.70	Chile; Gina Pareglio; Sara Montecinos; Hannelore Grosser; Ismenia Guzmán	3:47.60	Ecuador; Liliana Chalá; Mercy Colorado; Adriana Martínez; Mayra Carchi	3:54.62
10 Kilometres Walk	Mirian Ramón; Ecuador	50:46.1	Bertha Vera; Ecuador	56:37.3		
High jump	María Chomali; Chile	1.70	Ximena Guzmán; Peru	1.60	Claudia Brien; Chile	1.60
Long jump	Andrea Ávila; Argentina	6.12	Deisy Zereceda; Peru	5.64	María Luzio; Bolivia	5.48
Shot put	Carmen Chalá; Ecuador	13.44	Claudia Brien; Chile	12.80	Rosa Peña; Peru	12.66
Discus throw	Liliana Martinelli; Argentina	48.00 AR	Claudia Larenas; Chile	43.96	Carmen Chalá; Ecuador	43.14
Javelin throw	Claudia Brien; Chile	35.32	Hanny Basurco; Peru	35.02	Marie Musselmann; Peru	34.82
Heptathlon	Katherine Yáñez; Peru	4234	Marleni Olaechea; Peru	3681	Carmen Chalá; Ecuador	2421

== Medal table (unofficial) ==
* Host nation (Peru)

Rank	Nation	Gold	Silver	Bronze	Total
1	Chile	13	10	9	32
2	Ecuador	8	8	7	23
3	Argentina	7	3	4	14
4	Peru*	6	12	14	32
5	Uruguay	3	4	0	7
6	Venezuela	2	2	1	5
7	Suriname	2	0	0	2
8	Bolivia	1	2	5	8
9	Paraguay	0	1	0	1
Totals (9 entries)		42	42	40	124
