= Dorothy Scott =

Jamaican long jumper

Personal information
- Nationality: Jamaican
- Born: 31 August 1957 (age 68)

Sport
- Sport: Athletics
- Event: Long jump

Dorothy Scott (born 31 August 1957) is a Jamaican athlete. She competed in the women's long jump at the 1980 Summer Olympics and the 1984 Summer Olympics.

Scott competed in the AIAW for the Texas Woman's Pioneers track and field team, running on their sprint medley relay squad that finished 5th at the 1980 AIAW Outdoor Track and Field Championships.

== International competitions ==
Year	Competition	Venue	Position	Event	Notes
Representing Jamaica
1973	CARIFTA Games (U17)	Port of Spain, Trinidad and Tobago	1st	200 m	25.4
1974	CARIFTA Games (U20)	Kingston, Jamaica	1st	100 m	12.0
1974	CARIFTA Games (U20)	Kingston, Jamaica	1st	Long jump	5.62 m
1974	Central American and Caribbean; Junior Championships (U20)	Maracaibo, Venezuela	1st	100 m	11.77
1974	Central American and Caribbean; Junior Championships (U20)	Maracaibo, Venezuela	1st	Long jump	5.80 m
1974	Central American and Caribbean; Junior Championships (U20)	Maracaibo, Venezuela	1st	4 × 100 m relay	46.86
1978	Central American and Caribbean Games	Medellín, Colombia	2nd	4 × 100 m relay	44.41
1978	Commonwealth Games	Edmonton, Canada	20th (h)	100 m	11.99
1978	Commonwealth Games	Edmonton, Canada	5th	4 × 100 m relay	45.75
1979	Central American and Caribbean Championships	Guadalajara, Mexico	1st	4 × 100 m relay	44.82
1980	Olympic Games	Moscow, Soviet Union	17th (q)	Long jump	5.83 m
1981	Central American and Caribbean Championships	Santo Domingo, Dominican Republic	1st	4 × 100 m relay	44.62
1984	Olympic Games	Los Angeles, United States	10th	Long jump	6.40 m
