= 1974 Central American and Caribbean Junior Championships in Athletics =

I Central American and Caribbean Junior Championships
- Dates: 12–15 December
- Host city: Maracaibo, Venezuela
- Level: Junior
- Events: 36
- Participation: about 196 athletes from 10 nations

The 1st Central American and Caribbean Junior Championships was held in Maracaibo, Venezuela on 12–15 December 1974, one and a half year after having already hosted the 4th CAC senior championships in July 1973.

== Event summary ==
The athletes from Mexico gained most of the gold medals. In the total medal count, Venezuela equalizes the Mexican result, both countries gaining 21 each.

In the under-20 men category, Anthony Husbands, Trinidad and Tobago, won two gold (100m, 200m) and one silver medal (4 × 100 m relay), double gold was won by José Briano from Mexico (3000m, 5000m), and Carmelo Martínez from Cuba (Long jump, Triple jump).

In the under-20 women category, Dorothy Scott, Jamaica, won three golds (100m, Long jump, 4 × 100 m relay), and Maureen Gottschalk, Jamaica, gained two golds (200m, 4 × 400 m relay) and one bronze medal (400m).

The event saw an early appearance of Ernesto Canto, Mexico, won the gold medal in the men's 20 kilometre walk event at the 1984 Summer Olympics held in Los Angeles, United States. He was successful in the 10,000 metres track walk competition. Moreover, Luis Delís from Cuba won the Discus competition. He was going to win the bronze medal at the 1980 Summer Olympics in Moscow, Soviet Union, as well as silver at the 1983 World Championships in Helsinki, Finland, and bronze at the 1987 World Championships in Rome, Italy.

== Medal summary ==
Medal winners are published by category: Junior A, Male, and Junior A, Female.

=== Male Junior A (under 20) ===
Event	Gold		Silver		Bronze	
100 metres (4.1 m/s)	Anthony Husbands (TRI)	10.76 w	Miguel Conde (VEN)	10.76 w	Everard Samuels (JAM)	10.79 w
200 metres (1.8 m/s)	Anthony Husbands (TRI)	21.37	Miguel Conde (VEN)	21.40	Hamil Grimes (BAR)	21.42
400 metres	Alexis Herrera (VEN)	48.00	Harcourt Watson (BAR)	48.11	Richard Ross (TRI)	48.93
800 metres	Sedley Webster (JAM)	1:55.1	Restituto Ibáñez (MEX)	1:55.5	Trevor Small (BAR)	1:56.0
1500 metres	Ignacio Melecio (MEX)	3:58.3	Louis Charles (TRI)	4:02.5	Osman Escobar (VEN)	4:04.1
3000 metres	José Briano (MEX)	8:51.4	Isaías Matías (MEX)	8:52.6	Teodisio Perozo (VEN)	8:53.1
5000 metres	José Briano (MEX)	15:05.3	Pedro Santiago (PUR)	15:11.1	Pedro Rodríguez (VEN)	15:11.2
2000 metres steeplechase	Rubén Lee (MEX)	6:07.5	Guadalupe Bárcenas (MEX)	6:07.6	José Torres (PUR)	6:10.8
110 metres hurdles	Jesús Costa (PUR)	14.54	Jocelyn Wynter (JAM)	14.64	David Delgado (MEX)	14.82
400 metres hurdles	Mark Stoute (BAR)	55.82	Jesús Costa (PUR)	55.83	Freddy Aberdeen (VEN)	55.86
High jump	Juan Lago (MEX)	1.99	Owen Cunningham (JAM)	1.99	Mariano Reyes (DOM)	1.84
Pole vault	Carlos Zequeira (PUR)	4.00	Tomás Lugo (MEX)	3.80	Jorge Taylor (CUB)	3.70
Long jump	Carmelo Martínez (CUB)	7.05	Ray Quiñones (PUR)	6.85	Anthony Jones (TRI)	6.58
Triple jump	Carmelo Martínez (CUB)	15.58	José Rivera (PUR)	13.82	Héctor Landrau (PUR)	13.80
Shot put	Santiago Pernía (VEN)	13.88	Joey Ward (BAH)	13.68	Manuel Estrada (MEX)	13.00
Discus throw	Luis Delís (CUB)	49.02	Armando Orozco (CUB)	39.76	Orlando Figueros (PUR)	39.08
Hammer throw	Armando Orozco (CUB)	62.84	Pedro Escalona (PUR)	43.12	Raúl Franco (VEN)	40.64
Javelin throw	Orángel Rodríguez (VEN)	59.40	Rafael Vélez (PUR)	57.48	Enzo Serra (VEN)	53.68
Decathlon	Jorge Taylor (CUB)	6253	Javier Meza (MEX)	5653	Oscar Pérez (VEN)	5613
10,000 metres track walk	Ernesto Canto (MEX)	48:34.5	Marcos Castro (MEX)	51:36.0	Juan Polido (VEN)	62:45.3
4 × 100 metres relay	Jamaica; O. James; David Green; Roberts; Everard Samuels	41.96	Trinidad and Tobago; David Modeste; Cyril Lewis; Anthony Husbands; Gary Andrews	42.10	Venezuela; Alexis Herrera; Gómez; Hipolito Brown; Manuel Briceño	42.18
4 × 400 metres relay	Trinidad and Tobago; Anthony Meyers; Anthony Lyons; Searl Pascall; Richard Ross	3:17.71	Venezuela; Ismael Castañeda; César Romero; Enrique Regis; Alexis Herrera	3:19.54	Barbados; Hamil Grimes; Hardecourt; Mark Stoute; Trevor Small	3:21.52

=== Female Junior A (under 20) ===
Event	Gold		Silver		Bronze	
100 metres (2.9 m/s)	Dorothy Scott (JAM)	11.77 w	Esther Hope (TRI)	12.04 w	Carmeta Drummond (JAM)	12.07 w
200 metres (3.5 m/s)	Maureen Gottschalk (JAM)	24.29 w	Sandra Fournillier (TRI)	25.02 w	Adriana Marchena (VEN)	25.08 w
400 metres	Mercedes Álvarez (CUB)	55.90	Verone Webber (JAM)	56.23	Maureen Gottschalk (JAM)	56.33
800 metres	Adriana Marchena (VEN)	2:14.01	Ileana Hocking (PUR)	2:14.04	Reva Knight (JAM)	2:16.38
1500 metres	Ileana Hocking (PUR)	4:45.61	C. Vinar (JAM)	4:51.48	Cheryll Haynes (BAR)	4:54.08
100 metres hurdles (2.0 m/s)	María Ángeles Cato (MEX)	14.57	Angela Carbonell (CUB)	14.83	Cheryl Blackman (BAR)	14.94
High jump	Angela Carbonell (CUB)	1.72	Ana Rojas (VEN)	1.69	Margarita Ávila (MEX)	1.69
Long jump	Dorothy Scott (JAM)	5.80	Valerie Morris (JAM)	5.72	Angela Carbonell (CUB)	5.61
Shot put	Luz Gómez (MEX)	11.20	Lyn George (TRI)	10.84	Zenobia Aranguibel (VEN)	10.10
Discus throw	Zenobia Aranguibel (VEN)	34.38	Luz Gómez (MEX)	31.38	Greta Alexander (TRI)	28.80
Javelin throw	Lyn George (TRI)	42.04	Guadalupe Dávila (MEX)	37.12	Sonia Ojeda (VEN)	36.80
Pentathlon	María Ángeles Cato (MEX)	3717	Maritza García (CUB)	3697	Cheryl Blackman (BAR)	3038
4 × 100 metres relay	Jamaica; S. White; Dorothy Scott; E. Williams; Lola Ramsay	46.86	Trinidad and Tobago; Ann Adams; Esther Hope; Sandra Fournillier; Janice Bernard	47.07	Venezuela; Virginia Rincón; Deyanira Medina; Carmen Álvarez; Adriana Marchena	49.03
4 × 400 metres relay	Jamaica; Reva Knight; Verone Webber; Jackie Pusey; Maureen Gottschalk	3:51.91	Trinidad and Tobago; Drucilla Maxwell; Ann Adams; Jennifer Augustine; Carol Charles	3:52.51	Mexico; Guadelupe Gómez; Araceli Arana; Guadalupe García; María Ángeles Cato	3:55.27

== Medal table (unofficial) ==
* Host nation (VEN)

Rank	Nation	Gold	Silver	Bronze	Total
1	MEX	9	8	4	21
2	JAM	7	5	4	16
3	CUB	7	3	2	12
4	VEN*	5	4	13	22
5	TRI	4	7	3	14
6	PUR	3	7	3	13
7	BAR	1	1	6	8
8	BAH	0	1	0	1
9	DOM	0	0	1	1
Totals (9 entries)		36	36	36	108

== Participation (unofficial) ==
Detailed result lists can be found on the World Junior Athletics History website. An unofficial count yields the number of about 196 athletes from about 10 countries:

- Bahamas (1)
- Barbados (10)
- Costa Rica (3)
- Cuba (13)
- Dominican Republic (4)
- Jamaica (21)
- Mexico (30)
- Puerto Rico (41)
- Trinidad and Tobago (30)
- Venezuela (43)
