= 1975 South American Youth Championships in Athletics =

II South American Youth Championships in Athletics
- Dates: November 8–11
- Host city: Quito, Ecuador
- Venue: Estadio Atahualpa
- Level: Youth
- Events: 31
- Participation: about 212 athletes from 7 nations

The 2nd South American Youth Championships in Athletics were held in Quito, Ecuador, at the Estadio Atahualpa between November 8–11, 1975.

== Medal summary ==
Medal winners are published for boys and girls. Complete results can be found on the "World Junior Athletics History" website. All results are marked as "affected by altitude" (A), because the stadium in Quito is located at 2,780 metres above sea level.

=== Men ===
Event	Gold		Silver		Bronze	
100 metres	Pedro da Silveira (BRA)	10.6A	Rolando Satler (ARG)	10.8A	Romache Fisher (BRA)	10.8A
200 metres	Cristián Schwitzer (CHI)	22.4A	Pedro da Silveira (BRA)	22.4A	Eduardo Oscar de Brito (ARG)	22.7A
400 metres	Antônio Dias Ferreira (BRA)	50.3A	José de Oliveira (BRA)	50.5A	Julio Salguero (ECU)	50.9A
800 metres	Manuel Alamuza (COL)	2:01.5A	Rubén Cid (ARG)	2:01.7A	José Molina (COL)	2:05.4A
1500 metres	Carlos Aranda (COL)	4:12.3A	Benito Baranda (CHI)	4:15.4A	Jorge Cardona (COL)	4:16.9A
1500 metres steeplechase	Héctor Páramo (COL)	4:39.6A	Jorge Cardona (COL)	4:42.9A	Benito Baranda (CHI)	4:46.5A
110 metres hurdles	José Luis Lozano (PER)	14.7A	Luis Maletto (ARG)	14.8A	Luís Albieri (BRA)	14.8A
300 metres hurdles	Homero Gomes (BRA)	39.7A	José Luis Lozano (PER)	39.9A	Alfredo Edwards (CHI)	40.2A
High jump	Oscar Rocha (COL)	1.90A	Rodrigo de la Fuente (CHI)	1.90A	Carli Guerra (CHI)	1.90A
Pole vault	Daniel Mazzucco (ARG)	3.80A	Osvaldo Armentano (BRA)	3.70A	Sebastián Hevia (CHI)	3.60A
Long jump	Roberto Bobadilla (ECU)	6.70A	Nicolás Pautt (COL)	6.32A	Claudio Lippi (ARG)	6.27A
Triple jump	Germán Romañach (ARG)	14.51A	Nicolás Pautt (COL)	14.18A	João Luiz da Fonseca (BRA)	13.28A
Shot put	Carlos Pollo (ARG)	16.66A	Hugo Del Sueldo (ARG)	15.78A	Moacyr Amaral (BRA)	14.82A
Discus throw	Roberto Martínez (ARG)	47.52A	Antônio Cunha (BRA)	46.36A	Carlos Rossi (ARG)	43.60A
Hammer throw	Alberto Núñez (ARG)	54.92A	Ricardo dos Santos (BRA)	54.80A	Gilberto Silva (BRA)	53.60A
Javelin throw	Gerardo Martina (ARG)	54.42A	João Soares (BRA)	52.10A	Roberto Tegmeier (CHI)	50.12A
Hexathlon	Daniel Angheleri (ARG)	3494A	Carlos Cavallero (ARG)	3423A	Pablo Vicuña (CHI)	3308A
4 × 100 metres relay	Peru; Luis Chirinos; José Lozano; Jesús Ratto; José Luis Valverde	42.6A	Brazil; Paulo Antônio Lima; Antônio dos Santos; Romache Fisher; Pedro da Silveira	42.8A	Chile; Juan De La Motte; Alfredo Edwards Rossi; Jaime Viveros; Cristián Schweitzer	43.1A
4 × 400 metres relay	Brazil; Rafael Corrêa; José de Oliveira; Paulo Antônio Lima; Antônio Dias Ferreira	3:27.3A	Colombia; E. Mendoza; R. Riascos; Victor Pérez; Jaime Gómez	3:28.1A	Ecuador; Gino Rommo; Harry Pérez; Héctor Jativa; Julio Salguero	3:31.2A

=== Women ===
Event	Gold		Silver		Bronze	
100 metres	Esmeralda Garcia (BRA)	11.7A	Susana Perizzotti (ARG)	11.9A	Paz Ábalos (CHI)	12.1A
200 metres	Susana Perizzotti (ARG)	24.1A	Maria Amorim (BRA)	24.5A	Esmeralda Garcia (BRA)	24.5A
600 metres	Mara Führmann (BRA)	1:41.3A	Ena Guevara (PER)	1:41.4A	Sonia Nerpiti (ARG)	1:42.7A
80 metres hurdles	Carolina Cox (CHI)	12.1A	Susana Planas (ARG)	12.3A	Emérita Arboleda (COL)	12.6A
High jump	Julia Araya (CHI)	1.62A	Mónica Boeck (PER)	1.62A	Laura Inés Ragas (ARG)	1.62A
Long jump	Miriam Rojas (COL)	5.56A	Roxana Pereña (ARG)	5.45A	Graciela Rampello (ARG)	5.42A
Shot put	Elida Mabeline (BRA)	11.77A	Patricia Guerrero (PER)	11.64A	Denise Zen (BRA)	11.02A
Discus throw	Elida Mabeline (BRA)	36.16A	Maira Parks (PER)	35.82A	Janeth Tenorio (COL)	35.80A
Javelin throw	Maria Cavalheiro (BRA)	37.12A	Olga Verissimo (BRA)	36.76A	Patricia Guerrero (PER)	35.26A
Pentathlon	Rosemarie Boeck (PER)	3642A	Norma Rogatky (ARG)	3443A	Laura Keitel (CHI)	3149A
4 × 100 metres relay	Argentina; Maria Elvira Fernández; Adriana Freiberg; Adriana Calvo; Susana Perizzotti	47.9A	Brazil; Barbara do Nascimento; Rosemary Heller; Esmeralda Garcia; Maria Amorim	48.1A	Chile; Paz Ábalos; Bernardita Ábalos ? Carolina Cox	48.4A
4 × 400 metres relay	Chile; Paz Ábalos; Bernardita Ábalos; C. Palacios; Georgina Quiroz	4:00.5A	Brazil; Maria Ferreira; Marlene Schubert; Mara Führmann; Ionide Cruz	4:01.2A	Argentina; Maria Elvira Fernández; Sonia Nerpiti; Elba Labatte; Rosana Pereña	4:03.7A

== Medal table (unofficial) ==
* Host nation (Ecuador)

Rank	Nation	Gold	Silver	Bronze	Total
1	Brazil (BRA)	9	11	7	27
2	Argentina (ARG)	9	9	7	25
3	Colombia (COL)	5	4	4	13
4	Chile (CHI)	4	2	10	16
5	Peru (PER)	3	5	1	9
6	Ecuador (ECU)*	1	0	2	3
Totals (6 entries)		31	31	31	93

== Participation (unofficial) ==
Detailed result lists can be found on the "World Junior Athletics History" website. An unofficial count yields the number of about 212 athletes from about 7 countries:

- Argentina (39)
- Bolivia (7)
- Brazil (41)
- Chile (33)
- Colombia (35)
- Ecuador (28)
- (Peru) Perú (29)
