= Anthony Husbands =

Trinidad and Tobago sprinter

Medal record

Men's athletics

Representing Trinidad and Tobago

Central American and Caribbean Games
Gold medal – first place	1978 Medellín	4x100 m relay
Silver medal – second place	1978 Medellín	200 m

CAC Junior Championships (U20)
Gold medal – first place	1974 Maracaibo	100 m
Gold medal – first place	1974 Maracaibo	200 m
Silver medal – second place	1974 Maracaibo	4x00 m relay

CARIFTA Games Junior (U20)
Bronze medal – third place	1975 Hamilton	4x100 m relay

Anthony Husbands (born January 13, 1956, on Trinidad) is a retired sprinter from Trinidad and Tobago who specialized in the 200 metres.

Husbands was an NJCAA champion sprinter for Essex Community College. He was later an NCAA champion for the Alabama Crimson Tide track and field team, leading off the winning 4 × 400 m relay team at the 1978 NCAA Indoor Track and Field Championships.

== Achievements ==
Year	Competition	Venue	Position	Event	Notes
Representing Trinidad and Tobago
1974	Central American and Caribbean; Junior Championships (U20)	Maracaibo, Venezuela	1st	100 m	10.76 w (4.1 m/s)
1974	Central American and Caribbean; Junior Championships (U20)	Maracaibo, Venezuela	1st	200 m	21.37 (1.8 m/s)
1974	Central American and Caribbean; Junior Championships (U20)	Maracaibo, Venezuela	2nd	4 × 100 m relay	42.10
1975	CARIFTA Games (U20)	Hamilton, Bermuda	3rd	4 × 100 m relay	42.3
1976	Olympic Games	Montreal, Canada	11th (h)	4 × 100 m relay	39.88
1978	Central American and Caribbean Games	Medellín, Colombia	2nd	200 m	21.00
1978	Central American and Caribbean Games	Medellín, Colombia	1st	4 × 100 m relay	39.13
