= Athletics at the 1983 Pan American Games – Women's long jump =

Women's long jump at the Pan American Games

The women's long jump event at the 1983 Pan American Games was held in Caracas, Venezuela on 28 August.

== Results ==
Rank	Name	Nationality	Result	Notes
1st place, gold medalist(s)	Kathy McMillan	United States	6.70	
2nd place, silver medalist(s)	Eloína Hechavarría	Cuba	6.61	
3rd place, bronze medalist(s)	Pat Johnson	United States	6.33	
4	Shonel Ferguson	Bahamas	6.31	
5	Tudie McKnight	Jamaica	6.19	
6	Esmeralda García	Brazil	6.18	
7	Adelina Polledo	Cuba	6.14	
8	Karen Nelson	Canada	6.13	
9	Conceição Geremias	Brazil	6.04	
10	Rowan Maynard	Antigua and Barbuda	4.63	
