= Athletics at the 1979 Pan American Games – Women's pentathlon =

Women's pentathlon at the 1979 Pan American Games
- Venue: Estadio Sixto Escobar
- Winning points: 4605

Medalists
Gold medal	Diane Konihowski	Canada
Silver medal	Jodi Anderson	United States
Bronze medal	Jill Ross	Canada

The women's pentathlon competition of the athletics events at the 1979 Pan American Games took place at the Estadio Sixto Escobar. It was the first edition where the 800 metres was contested instead of the 200 metres as part of the pentathlon. It was actually also pentathlon's last appearance at the Games being replaced by the heptathlon from the next edition.

== Records ==
Prior to this competition, the existing world and Pan American Games records were as follows:

World record	Nadyezhda Tkachenko (URS)	4839	Lille, France	September 18, 1977
Pan American Games record	Patty Winslow (USA)	4860 (Note: Result achieved under different event rules)	Winnipeg, Canada	1967

== Results ==
KEY:	WR	World Record	GR	Pan American Record

The highest mark recorded in each event is highlighted in yellow

Rank	Athlete	Nationality	100m H	SP	HJ	LJ	800m	Points	Notes
1st place, gold medalist(s)	Diane Konihowski	Canada	14.18	15.37	1.80	6.20	2:14.2	4605	
2nd place, silver medalist(s)	Jodi Anderson	United States	13.70	12.28	1.71	6.13	2:10.8	4434	
3rd place, bronze medalist(s)	Jill Ross	Canada	14.32	10.19	1.65	5.93	2:11.2	4112	
4	Olga Verissimo	Brazil	14.54	11.84	1.62	5.22	2:21.4	3865	
5	Nancy Vallecilla	Ecuador	14.10	10.74	1.56	5.29	2:20.0	3818	
6	Yvonne Neddermann	Argentina	14.55w	11.27	1.56	5.46	2:21.8	3815	
7	María Ángeles Cato	Mexico	14.68	10.40	1.65	5.54	2:28.0	3782	
8	Elida Aveillé	Cuba	14.38	10.69	1.65	5.52	2:41.0	3706	
9	Margaret de Jesús	Puerto Rico	15.65	8.55	1.44	4.32	2:21.4	3105	
	Jane Frederick	United States	14.01	14.52	1.77	DNS	–	DNF	
	Alix Castillo	Venezuela	DNS	–	–	–	–	DNS	
