= Athletics at the 1983 Summer Universiade – Women's long jump =

The women's long jump event at the 1983 Summer Universiade was held at the Commonwealth Stadium in Edmonton, Canada on 10 and 11 July 1983.

== Medalists ==
Gold	Silver	Bronze
Anişoara Cuşmir; Romania	Svetlana Zorina; Soviet Union	Valy Ionescu; Romania

== Results ==
=== Qualification ===
Rank	Athlete	Nationality	Result	Notes
1	Anişoara Cuşmir	Romania	6.53	Q
2	Yolanda Chen	Soviet Union	6.46	Q
3	Svetlana Zorina	Soviet Union	6.44	Q
4	Elowa Torriente	Cuba	6.32	Q
5	Beverly Kinch	Great Britain	6.26	Q
6	Valy Ionescu	Romania	6.19	Q
?	Madeline de Jesús	Puerto Rico	6.18	Q
?	Liao Wenfen	China	6.15	Q
?	Esmeralda de Jesus Garcia	Brazil	6.13	Q
?	Vangelia Ilieva	Bulgaria	6.08	Q
?	Sharon Clarke	Canada	6.06	Q
?	Ana Oliveira	Portugal	6.03	Q
?	Myriam Duchateau	Belgium	?.??	Q
14	Angela Thacker	United States	6.02	
15	Gwen Loud	United States	5.93	
16	Carol Galloway	Canada	5.93	
17	Emilia Lenk	Mexico	5.69	
18	Estrella Roldán	Spain	5.64	
19	Faustina Assis	Angola	5.14	
20	Filomena Cruz	Angola	5.04	
21	Patricia Quiñónes	Guatemala	4.99	
22	Mina Zeina	Lebanon	4.92	

=== Final ===
Rank	Athlete	Nationality	Result	Notes
1st place, gold medalist(s)	Anişoara Cuşmir	Romania	7.06 w	
2nd place, silver medalist(s)	Svetlana Zorina	Soviet Union	6.81	
3rd place, bronze medalist(s)	Valy Ionescu	Romania	6.56 w	
4	Beverly Kinch	Great Britain	6.53	
5	Yolanda Chen	Soviet Union	6.52	
6	Elowa Torriente	Cuba	6.47	
7	Vangelia Ilieva	Bulgaria	6.29	
8	Madeline de Jesús	Puerto Rico	6.25	
9	Myriam Duchateau	Belgium	6.00	
10	Liao Wenfen	China	5.94	
11	Sharon Clarke	Canada	5.89	
12	Esmeralda de Jesus Garcia	Brazil	5.87	
13	Ana Oliveira	Portugal	5.83	
