= Everton Cornelius =

Antigua and Barbuda sprinter

Personal information
- Nationality: Antigua and Barbuda
- Born: 8 May 1955 (age 71)

Sport
- Sport: Sprinting
- Event: 4 × 100 metres relay

Everton Cornelius (born 8 May 1955) is an Antigua and Barbuda sprinter. He competed in the men's 4 × 100 metres relay at the 1976 Summer Olympics.
