= Wendy Hoyte =

British sprinter

Wendy Hoyte née Clarke
Personal information
- Nationality: British (English)
- Born: 17 December 1957 (age 68) London, England
- Height: 160 cm (5 ft 3 in)
- Weight: 52 kg (115 lb)

Sport
- Sport: Athletics
- Event: Sprints
- Club: Highgate Harriers
Medal record
Women's athletics
Representing Great Britain
European Championships
Silver medal – second place	1982 Athens	4×100 m
European Indoor Championships
Bronze medal – third place	1982 Milan	60 m
Representing England
Commonwealth Games
Gold medal – first place	1982 Brisbane	4×100 m

Wendy Patricia Hoyte (née Clarke; born 17 December 1957) is a British former sprinter, who won a 1982 Commonwealth Games gold medal and a 1982 European Championships silver medal in the 4 x 100 metres relay. She also competed at the 1976 Montreal Olympic Games. She is the holder of the United Kingdom indoor 50 m record, which she set in 1981. As of 2016, the record still stands.

== Biography ==
Clarke was born in London and was a member of Highgate Harriers and later the Borough of Hounslow Athletic Club. Clarke first came to prominence at the age of 17 in 1975, when she won two medals at the European Junior Championships in Athens. She won bronze in the 100 m in a wind assisted 11.53 secs, behind the East German pair of Petra Koppetsch and Marlies Oelsner (the future Marlies Gohr), then won silver behind Koppetsch in the 200 m in 23.85.

Clarke finished third behind Helen Golden in the 200 metres event at the 1975 WAAA Championships.

At the 1976 Olympics Games in Montreal, Clarke represented Great Britain in the sprint relay, running the first leg for the British quartet that finished eighth in the final.

In 1979, Clarke finished fourth in the 60 m final at the European Indoor Championships in Vienna. She was selected for the relay squad for the 1980 Moscow Olympics but did not get to compete.

Clarke married Leslie Hoyte in Islington during late 1980 and competed under her married name thereafter.

In 1981, Hoyte broke the UK indoor record for the 50 m with 6.21 secs in the heats of the European Indoor Championships, before placing sixth in the final (usually a 60 m race, the event was held over 50 m in 1981). The record (as of 2014) has stood for over thirty three years. In the late 70s and early 80s she won six AAAs national titles. She was the AAAs 100 m champion in 1981 and 1982 and the AAAs indoor 60 m champion in 1977, 1980, 1981 and 1982.

Hoyte's best year was in 1982. Indoors, she won a bronze medal in the 60 m at the European Indoor Championships in Milan. At the European Championships in Athens she reached the 100 m final, placing eighth, then won a silver medal as part of the British 4 × 100 m relay quartet, along with Kathy Smallwood, Bev Callender and Shirley Thomas. At the Commonwealth Games in Brisbane, representing England, she finished fifth in the 100 m final and won a gold medal in the relay, along with Smallwood, Callender and Sonia Lannaman.

Hoyte missed trying for the 1984 Olympics due to pregnancy. In 1986, she competed at the European Championships in Stuttgart, finishing fifth in the 4 × 100 m relay final.

In 1987, Hoyte competed at three major Championships, she finished fifth in the 60 m final at the European Indoor Championships in Lievin and reached the semi-finals of the 60 m at the World Indoor Championships in Indianapolis. Outdoors, she ran in the sprint relay at the World Championships in Rome. She competed at the 1988 UK Olympic trials in Birmingham, but failed to earn Olympic selection.

== Personal bests ==
- 50 metres 6.21 Grenoble 22 February 1981 (UK Record)
- 60 metres 7.20 Lievin 22 February 1987 (7th on UK all-time list)
- 100 metres 11.31 Brisbane 4 October 1982
- 200 metres 23.48 London (Crystal Palace) 7 June 1975

== Personal life ==
She is married to Les Hoyte, also a leading sprinter (brother of Trevor Hoyte, 1978 Commonwealth 200 m finalist), and is the mother of footballers Justin, a former England U21 and Trinidad & Tobago international, and Gavin, who plays for Maidstone United and was an England U19 international. She is the aunt of the British sprinter Chris Clarke.

== International competitions ==
Year	Competition	Venue	Position	Event	Notes
1975	European Junior Championships	Athens, Greece	3rd	100 m	11.53
1975	European Junior Championships	Athens, Greece	2nd	200 m	23.85
1976	Olympic Games	Montreal, Canada	8th	4 × 100 m	43.79 (43.53)
1978	Commonwealth Games	Edmonton, Canada	8th	100 m	11.48
1979	European Indoor Championships	Vienna, Austria	4th	60 m	7.26
1981	European Indoor Championships	Grenoble, France	6th	50 m	6.30 (6.21)
1982	European Indoor Championships	Milan, Italy	3rd	60 m	7.27 (7.21)
1982	European Championships	Athens, Greece	8th	100 m	12.35 (11.41)
1982	European Championships	Athens, Greece	2nd	4 × 100 m	42.66
1982	Commonwealth Games	Brisbane, Australia	5th	100 m	11.31
1982	Commonwealth Games	Brisbane, Australia	1st	4 × 100 m	43.15
1986	European Championships	Stuttgart, West Germany	5th	4 × 100 m	43.44
1987	European Indoor Championships	Liévin, France	5th	60 m	7.27 (7.20)
1987	World Indoor Championships	Indianapolis, United States	semi-final	60 m	7.33
1987	World Championships	Rome, Italy	heats	4 × 100 m	44.21

- Note: Results in brackets, indicate superior time achieved in an earlier round
