= Jackie Washington (sprinter) =

American sprinter (born 1962)

Personal information
- Born: Jacqueline Washington; July 17, 1962 (age 63)

Sport
- Country: United States
- Sport: Athletics
- Event: Sprinting
Medal record
Pan American Games
Gold medal – first place	1983 Caracas	4x100 m relay
Silver medal – second place	1983 Caracas	100 m
University Games
Gold medal – first place	1981 Bucharest	4x100 m relay
Gold medal – first place	1983 Edmonton	4x100 m relay
Gold medal – first place	1987 Zagreb	4x100 m relay

Jacqueline Washington (born July 17, 1962) is an American former athletics competitor.

Washington, a sprinter, attended the University of Houston during the early 1980s, earning All-American honors three times. She won three gold medals with the U.S. 4×100 metres relay team at the World University Games and another gold at the 1983 Pan American Games, where she also claimed a silver in the individual 100 metres event. Running sixth in the Olympic trials, Washington was a reserve in the relay team for the 1984 Summer Olympics in Los Angeles.
