= Angela Bridgeman =

Scottish athlete (born 1963/4)

Angela Bridgeman-Baxter
Personal information
- Born: Angela Bridgeman; 1963 or 1964 (age 61–62) London, England
Medal record
Representing Scotland
Commonwealth Games
Bronze medal – third place	1982 Auckland	4×400 metres relay

Angela Wendy Bridgeman-Baxter (born 1963 or 1964) is a Scottish former athlete.

== Life and career ==
She was born in London and her family moved to Glasgow when she was four months old. Her parents were born in Trinidad. She studied biochemistry at the University of Glasgow and then, in 1984, attended at Brigham Young University, Utah, US graduating with a sport and business degree in 1989.

She competed for Scotland at the Commonwealth Games in 1982 where she won a bronze medal in the 4×400m relay. She also competed at the 1986 games in the 200m and 4 × 100m relay events. She won Scottish national titles in the 100m in 1982, 200m in 1981 and 1989 and the 400m in 1993 and competed in 20 international events. She won Glasgow's Sportsperson of the Year in 1981.

She was not selected for the Scottish team for the 1990 Commonwealth Games due to a Scottish Women's AAA rule which stated that studying abroad meant that she had not been a resident of Scotland for the required six months and as she was not born in Scotland and neither were her parents she was no longer eligible for the Scottish team. This was despite not being eligible under the same rules to have competed in the 1986 games and being eligible under the Commonwealth Games Federation rules.

She married Kurt Baxter, an American basketball player, in 1987.
