= Adrienne Smyth =

Adrienne Alexandra Smyth (born 27 July 1950) is a former British sprinter and middle-distance runner.

== Career ==
At the 1970 British Commonwealth Games in Edinburgh, she was eliminated in the 800 metres in the heats and finished seventh in the 4 x 100 metres relay with the Northern Ireland team.

At the 1978 Commonwealth Games in Edmonton, she reached the semi-finals in the 400 and 800 metres.

She was Northern Irish champion four times in the 100 metres and 100 yards (1967–1970), once in the 220 yards (1967), four times in the 400 metres (1971, 1974, 1975, 1977) and seven times in the 800 metres and 880 yards (1968–1972, 1975, 1977). In 1968 she became Scottish champion in the 880 yards and in 1969 in the 400 metres.

== Personal bests ==
Distance	Year	Time
100 metres	1975	12.2 seconds
200 metres	1978	24.91 seconds
400 metres	1978	53.98 seconds
800 metres	1970	2:06.05 min
