= Hannah Afriyie =

Ghanaian sprinter (born 1951)

Personal information
- Nationality: Ghanaian
- Born: 21 December 1951 (age 74)
- Height: 1.65 m (5.4 ft)
- Weight: 52.0 kg (114.6 lb)

Sport
- Country: Ghana
- Sport: Track and field
- Event(s): 100 m, 200 m, 4x100 m

Achievements and titles
- Olympic finals: 1972
- Personal best(s): 100m: 11.47 (1978); 200m: 23.01 (1978)
Medal record
Women's athletics
Representing Ghana
All-Africa Games
Gold medal – first place	1978 Algiers	100 m
Gold medal – first place	1978 Algiers	200 m
African Championships
Gold medal – first place	1979 Dakar	200 m
Gold medal – first place	1979 Dakar	4×100 m
Gold medal – first place	1979 Dakar	4×400 m
Silver medal – second place	1979 Dakar	100 m

Hannah Afriyie (born 21 December 1951) is a retired Ghanaian track and field athlete. She won two gold medals in the 100 and 200 metres sprints at the 1978 All-Africa Games held in Algiers.

Afriyie reached the quarter finals of the 100 metres and the 200 metres at the 1972 Summer Olympics.

In the 1977 West African games in Lagos, she won the silver medal in the 100 metres.
