= Olga Antonova (athlete) =

Russian track and field sprinter (born 1960)

Personal information
- Born: 16 February 1960 (age 66)

Sport
- Sport: Track and field
Medal record
Representing Soviet Union
World Championships
Bronze medal – third place	1987 Rome	4×100 m relay
European Indoor Championships
Bronze medal – third place	1984 Gothenburg	200 m
Summer Universiade
Bronze medal – third place	1981 Bucharest	100 m
Bronze medal – third place	1983 Edmonton	4x100 m relay

Olga Antonova (Russian: Ольга Антонова; née Nasonova; born 16 February 1960) is a Russian former track and field sprinter who competed for the Soviet Union. She represented her country at the World Championships in Athletics in 1983 and 1987, winning a relay medal at the latter edition. She was a bronze medallist over 200 m at the 1984 European Athletics Indoor Championships and was a two-time Soviet indoor champion over 60 metres.

== Career ==
Antonova won her first international medal at the 1981 Summer Universiade, where she was the 100 metres bronze medallist. Her first full senior outing came at the 1981 IAAF World Cup, where as part of the Soviet 4×100 metres relay team (alongside Olga Zolotaryova, Lyudmila Kondratyeva and Natalya Bochina) she won a further bronze medal.

A run of 11.24 seconds for the 100 m earned her a place at the inaugural 1983 World Championships in Athletics. She reached the semi-finals of the event and was the fastest athlete not to reach the final. Antonova established her indoor pedigree by taking her first national title in the 60 metres at the Soviet Indoor Athletics Championships in 1984. She opted for the longer 200 metres distance at the 1984 European Athletics Indoor Championships and came away with the bronze medal (although she was almost a second slower than the winner Jarmila Kratochvílová).

Antonova slipped back in the national rankings after 1984 and only returned to the national team in 1987, after a lifetime best run of 11.19 seconds for the 100 m in Chelyabinsk. She was chosen to run the anchor leg of the relay in a Soviet women's team including Irina Slyusar, Natalya Pomoshchnikova, and Natalya German. The team ended up a clear third place behind the American and East German women.

Antonova did not compete internationally after 1987, though she achieved a second national title in the 60 m in 1988, setting a lifetime best of 7.25 seconds for the distance.

== Personal bests ==
- 100 metres – 11.19 seconds (1987)
- 60 metres (indoor) – 7.25 (1988)
- 200 metres (indoor) – 23.66 seconds (1984)

== National titles ==
- Soviet Indoor Athletics Championships
  - 60 metres: 1984, 1988

== International competitions ==
Year	Competition	Venue	Position	Event	Notes
1981	Universiade	Bucharest, Romania	3rd	100 m	11.54
1981	World Cup	Rome, Italy	3rd	4 × 100 m relay	43.01
1983	World Championships	Helsinki, Finland	5th (semis)	100 m	11.30
1984	European Indoor Championships	Gothenburg, Sweden	3rd	200 m	23.80
1984	Friendship Games	Moscow, Soviet Union	8th	100 m	11.33
1984	Friendship Games	Moscow, Soviet Union	2nd	4 × 100 m relay	42.71
1987	World Championships	Rome, Italy	3rd	4 × 100 m relay	42.33
