= Gillian Forde =

Trinidad and Tobago sprinter

Personal information
- Nationality: Trinidad and Tobago
- Born: 5 November 1967 (age 57)

Sport
- Sport: Sprinting
- Event: 100 metres

Gillian Forde (born 5 November 1967) is a Trinidad and Tobago sprinter. She competed in the women's 100 metres at the 1984 Summer Olympics.
