= Margot Wells =

British athlete

- Born: Margaret Cummings Wilkie; 10 October 1952 (age 73); Dunfermline, Scotland
- Occupation: rugby coach
- Known for: founder of Wellfast – Margot Wells School of Speed

Margot Cumming Wells (née Wilkie; born 10 October 1952) is a Scottish sprint and fitness coach based in Guildford, Surrey and a former Scottish champion sprinter.

== Early career ==
Wells started her coaching career by helping her husband Allan Wells win an Olympic Gold and silver medal in the 100m and 200m respectively at the Moscow Olympics in 1980. In the run-up to the Games, she protected him from hate mail generated by the then Soviet Union's involvement in Afghanistan.

== Career ==
In the early 1990s, she coached rugby players for the club London Scottish. She then took a break from coaching to raise the couple's two children, before returning to coach London Wasps players Danny Cipriani and Thom Evans.

Her stable of sportsmen and women includes:

- Danny Cipriani – England and Wasps Fly Half
- Andy Gomarsall – England and Harlequins Scrum Half
- James Haskell – England and Wasps Back Row
- Paul Sackey – England and Wasps Winger
- Tom Voyce – England and Wasps Winger
- Dom Waldouck – England Saxons and Wasps Centre
- Mike Brown – England and Harlequins Full Back
