= Angela Williams (sprinter, born 1965) =

American track and field sprinter

Angela Williams (born May 15, 1965 in Laventille, Trinidad) is a retired track and field sprinter. She began running at age 10 after her family moved to Brooklyn, New York. A highly recruited high school athlete, she ran first for Tennessee State University, then later Seton Hall University. She opted to run internationally for her native Trinidad and Tobago, getting her first taste of international competition while still in high school at the 1982 Central American and Caribbean Games, winning a gold medal in the 4×100 metres relay and an individual silver medal in the 200 metres, Later that year she also ran at the 1982 Commonwealth Games, the relay team finishing in 6th place. The next year she also ran the 200 and anchored the relay at the 1983 Pan American Games, winning a silver medal in the 4 x 100 metres. And as a 19 year old seasoned veteran, anchored their team in the 4×100 metres relay at the 1984 Olympics. She also ran in the 100 metres making it to the quarterfinal round, but well behind the three American sprinters, Evelyn Ashford Alice Brown would win the Gold and Silver and later set the world record in the relay. She was the third fastest Angela in the 100 metres after Canadians Angela Bailey and Angella Taylor. Four years later she ran in the 1988 Olympics again making it to the quarter-final round in the 100 metres before being eliminated behind eventual silver medalist Ashford and again behind Bailey and Taylor now named Issajenko. In the 200 metres she also made it to the quarter-final round.

After graduating from Seton Hall, Williams taught and coached at Thurgood Marshall High School and is currently coaching at Prairie View A&M.
