= Bethanie Nail =

Australian athletics competitor

Personal information
- Born: 24 March 1956 (age 70)
Medal record
Women's athletics
Representing Australia
Commonwealth Games
Silver medal – second place	1978 Edmonton	4 x 400 m relay
Bronze medal – third place	1978 Edmonton	400 m

Bethanie Anne Nail (married name Kearney; born 24 March 1956) is a retired Australian athlete who specialised in sprint and middle distance running events.

She competed in her first international competition in 1974, at the 1974 British Commonwealth Games. She competed in the 400 metres event.

In her first Olympic competition in Montreal, 1976, Kearney competed in the 400 metres, and the 4 × 400 metres relay events. The relay team came fourth in the final with a time of 3 m 25.56 secs.

At the 1978 Commonwealth Games in Edmonton, she won a bronze medal in the 400 metres and a silver in the 4 × 400 metres relay.

She is currently on the Executive of the Tasmanian Olympic Council.

== See also ==
- Australian athletics champions (Women)
