= Nzaeli Kyomo =

Tanzanian sprinter

Personal information
- Nationality: Tanzanian
- Born: June 2, 1957 (age 69)

Sport
- Sport: Track
- Event(s): 100 meters, 200 meters

Achievements and titles
- Personal best(s): 100 meters: 11.2; 200 meters: 23.3
Medal record
Women's athletics
Representing Tanzania
African Championships
Gold medal – first place	1982 Cairo	200 m
Silver medal – second place	1979 Dakar	200 m
Bronze medal – third place	1979 Dakar	100 m
Bronze medal – third place	1982 Cairo	100 m

Nzaeli Kyomo (born 2 June 1957) is a Tanzanian former sprinter who competed in the 1980 Moscow Olympics and the 1984 Los Angeles Olympics. She is the founder of Kyomo.org which provide basic education, clothing and food for the children of Tanzania. She is also a dancer and member of Art of the Olympians.
