= Debbie Jones (athlete) =

Bermudian sprinter

Personal information
- Nationality: Bermudian
- Born: 4 June 1958 (age 68)
- Spouse(s): Anthony Hunter, Sr.

Sport
- Sport: Sprinting
- Event: 100 metres
- College team: Tennessee State University

Debbie Jones (born 4 June 1958) is a Bermudian sprinter. She attended Tennessee State University in Nashville, Tennessee. She competed in the women's 100 metres at the 1976 Summer Olympics. She is the first athlete to win the Carifta Games' Austin Sealy Award for Outstanding Athlete of the Games. She received the award in 1977.

She is married to Anthony Hunter.
