= Jabou Jawo =

Gambian sprinter

Personal information
- Nationality: Gambian
- Born: 18 April 1962 (age 64)

Sport
- Sport: Sprinting
- Event: 100 metres
Medal record
Women's athletics
Representing Gambia
African Championships
Bronze medal – third place	1984 Rabat	4×100 m

Jabou Jawo (born 18 April 1962) is a Gambian sprinter. She competed in the 100 metres at the 1984 Summer Olympics and the 1988 Summer Olympics. She was the first woman to represent the Gambia at the Olympics.
