= Ruth Waithera =

Kenyan sprinter

Personal information
- Born: August 17, 1958 (age 67) Shamata, Kenya

Sport
- Sport: Track and field
Medal record
Representing Kenya
African Championships
Silver medal – second place	1979 Dakar	4×400 m
Bronze medal – third place	1979 Dakar	200 m

Ruth Waithera Nganga (born August 17, 1958) is a retired sprinter from Kenya.

Waithera won bronze over 200 metres at the 1978 All-Africa games and 1979 African Championships. Waithera won twice three sprint events (100, 200 and 400 meters) at the East and Central African Championships; in 1977 and 1979.

She competed at the 1984 Summer Olympics, finishing 8th in 400 metres race and reaching 200 metres semifinals. She became the first African woman to reach 400 metres Olympic final. At the time she was studying at the University of Arizona and she won NCAA Division I Women's Indoor Championship in 400 metres in 1984. At the 2004 Kenyan championships she won three individual gold medals; 100, 200 and 400 metres.

Waithera still holds the Women's 400 metres Kenyan record, 51.56, set in 1984. In 2008 Elizabeth Muthuka broke the record, but tested positive for doping. Thus Waithera's record remains in force. As of 2008, Waithera remains also the latest Kenyan woman to compete 400 metres at the Olympics. Waithera is a former African record holder over 400 metres.

Waithera is from Shamata village. She was a member of the Kenya Air Force. She established the Avenue Sports Club in 1998 to give orphan children an opportunity to have a career in athletics. In 1990 she was awarded a membership of the Arizona Sports Hall of Fame.

She is not to be confused with a Kenyan steeplechase runner, born in 1990, who is also named Ruth Waithera.

== Achievements ==
Year	Competition	Venue	Position	Event	Notes
Representing Kenya
1979	African Championships	Dakar, Senegal	3rd	200 m	24.66 s
