= Denise Boyd =

Australian sprinter

Denise Boyd née Robertson
Personal information
- Nationality: Australian
- Born: 15 December 1952 (age 73)
- Height: 5 ft 9 in (175 cm)
- Weight: 134 lb (61 kg)

Sport
- Sport: Athletics
- Event: Sprints
Medal record
Women's Athletics
Representing Australia
Commonwealth Games
Gold medal – first place	Edmonton 1978	200 metres
Gold medal – first place	Christchurch 1974	4 x 100 metres
Silver medal – second place	Christchurch 1974	200 metres
Silver medal – second place	Edmonton 1978	4 x 400 metres
Silver medal – second place	Brisbane 1982	4 x 400 metres
Bronze medal – third place	Christchurch 1974	100 metres
Bronze medal – third place	Edmonton 1978	100 metres
Bronze medal – third place	Edmonton 1978	4 x 100 metres

Denise Margaret Boyd née Robertson (born 15 December 1952) is an Australian former Olympic sprinter, who reached two Olympic finals in the 200 metres sprint.

== Biography ==
At the 1973 Pacific Conference Games in Toronto, Robertson won gold in the 200 metres and Sprint relay, as well as bronze in the 100 metres. The following year at the 1974 British Commonwealth Games in Christchurch, New Zealand, she represented Australia and won three medals, including gold in the 4 x 100 metres.

Robertson finished second behind Andrea Lynch in the 100 metres event at the British 1975 WAAA Championships.

After taking her married name of Boyd, she reached the final of the Women's 200 metres at the 1976 Olympics Games in Montreal. She was also a member of the Australian sprint relay team, that reached the final in 1976.

At the 1977 Pacific Conference Games in Canberra, Boyd won four golds in the 100, 200, 4x100 and 4x400 and then won two Commonwealth gold medals for 200 metres and 4x100 relay at the 1978 Commonwealth Games in Edmonton.

Boyd also won four Australian National 100m titles and five 200m championships, as well as winning the 400 in 1983. She also won the British 400 metres WAAA Championships title at the 1983 WAAA Championships.

== Best performances ==
- 100 m: 11.35 (Moscow, 1980)
- 200 m: 22.35 (Sydney, 1980)
- 400 m: 51.48 (Melbourne, 1983)
- fastest manual 100 and 200 times by an Australian woman, 11.00 in the 100 in Sydney 1973, and 200 22.3 also Sydney in 1979.

== Personal life ==
Her husband, Ray Boyd was also a Commonwealth Games champion and double-Olympic representative in the pole vault. The Boyds have three children, all of whom are successful athletes:

- Alana (born 10 May 1984) - 4.55 m Olympic pole vaulter
- Jacinta (born 10 February 1986) - 6.64 m long jumper
- Matthew (Matt) (born 29 April 1988) - 5.35 m pole vaulter

In 2009 Denise Boyd was inducted into the Queensland Sport Hall of Fame.

== See also ==
- Australian athletics champions (Women)
