= 1980 CARIFTA Games =

IX CARIFTA Games
- Dates: May 3–4
- Host city: Hamilton, Bermuda
- Level: Junior and Youth
- Events: 48
- Participation: about 178 athletes from 13 nations

The 9th CARIFTA Games was held in Hamilton, Bermuda on May 3–4, 1980.

== Participation (unofficial) ==
Detailed result lists can be found on the "World Junior Athletics History" website. An unofficial count yields the number of about 178 athletes (105 junior (under-20) and 73 youth (under-17)) from about 13 countries: Antigua and Barbuda (2), Bahamas (41), Barbados (20), Bermuda (34), Cayman Islands (1), Grenada (4), Guyana (3), Jamaica (38), Lesser Antilles (2), Saint Kitts and Nevis (1), Trinidad and Tobago (19), Turks and Caicos Islands (2).

== Austin Sealy Award ==
The Austin Sealy Trophy for the most outstanding athlete of the games was awardeded to Richard Louis from Barbados. He won 2 gold (200m, 400m) and 1 silver (100m) medals in the youth (U-17) category.

== Medal summary ==
Medal winners are published by category: Boys under 20 (Junior), Girls under 20 (Junior), Boys under 17 (Youth), and Girls under 17 (Youth). Complete results can be found on the "World Junior Athletics History" website.

=== Boys under 20 (Junior) ===
Event	Gold		Silver		Bronze	
100 metres	Fabian Whymns (BAH)	10.51	Scott Ferguson (TRI)	10.56	Leroy Reid (JAM)	10.56
200 metres	Leroy Reid (JAM)	22.14	Fabian Whymns (BAH)	22.20	David Phillips (BAR)	22.30
400 metres	Carl Meylor (JAM)	48.10	Ellis Maitland (GRN)	48.30	David Charlton (BAH)	48.38
800 metres	Reuben Bayley (BAR)	1:54.8	Claude Diomar (GLP)	1:55.0	Gordon Hinds (BAR)	1:55.3
1500 metres	Wilbur Ferdinand (TRI)	4:04.5	Byron Francis (JAM)	4:05.2	Nasson Warner (GUY)	4:05.4
5000 metres	Wilbur Ferdinand (TRI)	15:31.5	Gilbert Dunkley (JAM)	15:33.7	Sterling Butler (BAH)	16:03.4
110 metres hurdles	Gerald Martin (JAM)	14.98	David Charlton (BAH)	15.32	Michael Slocombe (BAR)	15.43
400 metres hurdles	David Charlton (BAH)	53.81	Dennis Wallace (JAM)	55.22	Denton Clarke (JAM)	56.4
High jump	Delroy Poyser (JAM)	2.08	Nick Saunders (BER)	2.05	Christian Laurac (GLP)	2.02
Pole vault	Michael Johnson (JAM)	3.80	Steve Wray (BAH)	3.50	Ramon Ramirez (BER)	3.35
Long jump	Ed Stuart (BAH)	7.45	Brad Johnson (BAH)	7.17	Anthony Phillip (BER)	7.15
Triple jump	Brad Johnson (BAH)	15.31	Lester Benjamin (ATG)	15.11	Dorant Bartlett (BAH)	14.92
Shot put	José Bertin-Casimir (GLP)	16.07	James Dedier (TRI)	15.73	Wilfred Seymour (BAH)	15.38
Discus throw	James Dedier (TRI)	52.95	Derrick Horsham (JAM)	51.40	Allister Joseph (TRI)	44.20
Javelin throw	Vinson Humphrey (GUY)	58.24	Carl Rolle (BAH)	49.96	Courtland Holder (BAR)	49.32
4 × 100 metres relay	Jamaica	41.67	Bahamas	41.87	Trinidad and Tobago	42.55
4 × 400 metres relay	Jamaica	3:17.6	Bahamas	3:20.2	Trinidad and Tobago	3:23.2

=== Girls under 20 (Junior) ===
Event	Gold		Silver		Bronze	
100 metres	Oralee Fowler (BAH)	11.84	Mary Ann Higgs (BAH)	11.91	Martine Cassin (GLP)	11.97
200 metres	Mary Ann Higgs (BAH)	25.09	Esme Austin (BAR)	25.18	Ruperta Charles (ATG)	25.34
400 metres	Oralee Fowler (BAH)	54.76	Marcia Tate (JAM)	55.61	Esme Austin (BAR)	56.26
800 metres	Marcia Tate (JAM)	2:15.4	Eugenie Beason (JAM)	2:15.5	Cheryl Innis (BAR)	2:17.0
1500 metres	Daphne Fearon (JAM)	4:45.6	Sharon Alleyne (TRI)	4:51.2	Margaret Williams (JAM)	4:53.8
3000 metres	Daphne Fearon (JAM)	10:20.0	Margaret Williams (JAM)	10.23.9	Rachelle Miller (BAH)	11:01.5
100 metres hurdles	Myrtle Chester (GUY)	14.96	Gina Tempro (BAR)	15.64	Cynthia Henry (JAM)	16.81
High jump	Sharon Rose (BAH)	1.65	Marie Gill (BAR)	1.65	Myrtle Chester (GUY)	1.65
Long jump	Ruperta Charles (ATG)	5.81	Cynthia Henry (JAM)	5.80	Myrtle Chester (GUY)	5.79
Shot put	Marie-Josée Manette (GLP)	12.23	Marlene Lewis (JAM)	12.22	Sonya Smith (BER)	11.60
Discus throw	Carol Woodside (BAH)	37.73	Edna Murray (JAM)	37.62	Carla Boothe (BAH)	36.95
Javelin throw	Sonya Smith (BER)	47.52	Wendy Griffith (BAR)	46.10	Carol Woodside (BAH)	42.20
4 × 100 metres relay	Jamaica	47.30	Bahamas	???	Barbados	???
4 × 400 metres relay	Jamaica	3:48.0	Bahamas	3:49.7	Trinidad and Tobago	3:52.4

=== Boys under 17 (Youth) ===
Event	Gold		Silver		Bronze	
100 metres	Earle Laing (JAM)	10.93	Richard Louis (BAR)	11.04	Anthony Munroe (TRI)	11.10
200 metres	Richard Louis (BAR)	22.30	Joey Wells (BAH)	22.74	Earle Laing (JAM)	22.82
400 metres	Richard Louis (BAR)	49.51	Joey Wells (BAH)	50.05	Delroy Kidd (JAM)	50.91
800 metres	Derek Rolle (BAH)	2:03.7	Raul McKenzie (JAM)	2:04.2	Carlyle Bernard (TRI)	2:04.3
High jump	Dennis Richards (BAH)	1.87	Arnold Forbes (BAH)	1.79	Troy Glasgow (BER)	1.79
Long jump	Joey Wells (BAH)	7.02	Keith Carey (BAH)	6.78	Bruno Latin (GLP)	6.58
Triple jump	Lyndon Sands (BAH)	15.03	Keith Carey (BAH)	13.66	Lyle Millett (BER)	12.58
Shot put	Thierry Liveze (GLP)	15.22	Algernon Busby (BER)	15.17	Jeff Knowles (BAH)	14.28
Javelin throw	Brooke Onley (BER)	51.70	Jeff Knowles (BAH)	44.52	John Sands (BAH)	43.82

=== Girls under 17 (Youth) ===
Event	Gold		Silver		Bronze	
100 metres	Juliet Cuthbert (JAM)	12.0	Joy Ann Clark (BAR)	12.0	Eldece Clarke (BAH)	12.0
200 metres	Candy Ford (BER)	24.79	Juliet Cuthbert (JAM)	25.58	Maxine McMillan (TRI)	25.76
400 metres	Yolande Small (TRI)	57.13	Carlon Blackman (BAR)	57.98	Suzanne Durham (BER)	58.30
800 metres	Marie-Anna Filomin (GLP)	2:16.6	Rolanda Dill (BER)	2:19.9	Reslyn Mitchell (GRN)	2:20.4
High jump	Sandra Eastmond (BAR)	1.63	Andrene Anderson (JAM)	1.60	Florence Kelly (BAH)	1.57
Long jump	Ingrid Boyce (BAR)	5.78	Andrene Anderson (JAM)	5.42	Joy Ann Clark (BAR)	5.16
Shot put	Jan Antoine (BAH)	10.62	Mary Francis (JAM)	9.05	Denise Clarke (TRI)	9.04
Javelin throw	Portia Wallace (BAH)	32.52	Michelle Culmer (BAH)	32.24	Mary Francis (JAM)	24.76

== Medal table (unofficial) ==
* Host nation (Bermuda)

Rank	Nation	Gold	Silver	Bronze	Total
1	Bahamas (BAH)	15	17	11	43
2	Jamaica (JAM)	14	15	7	36
3	Barbados (BAR)	5	7	8	20
4	Trinidad and Tobago (TTO)	4	3	8	15
5	Guadeloupe (GLP)	4	1	3	8
6	Bermuda (BER)*	3	3	6	12
7	Guyana (GUY)	2	0	3	5
8	Antigua and Barbuda (ATG)	1	1	1	3
9	Grenada (GRN)	0	1	1	2
Totals (9 entries)		48	48	48	144
