= 1979 CARIFTA Games =

VIII CARIFTA Games
- Dates: April 20–22
- Host city: Kingston, Jamaica
- Level: Junior and Youth
- Events: 42
- Participation: about 183 athletes from 14 nations

The 8th CARIFTA Games was held in Kingston, Jamaica on April 20–22, 1979.

== Participation (unofficial) ==
Detailed result lists can be found on the "World Junior Athletics History" website. An unofficial count yields the number of about 183 athletes (131 junior (under-20) and 52 youth (under-17)) from about 14 countries: Antigua and Barbuda (1), Bahamas (36), Bermuda (23), British Virgin Islands (2), Cayman Islands (3), Grenada (3), Guadeloupe (4), Guyana (10), Jamaica (44), Lesser Antilles (1), Martinique (10), Saint Christopher-Nevis-Anguilla (2), Trinidad and Tobago (20).

== Austin Sealy Award ==
The Austin Sealy Trophy was awarded to Thaon Jon Jones from Jamaica. He won 4 gold medals (100m, 200m, long jump, triple jump) in the youth (U-17) category, and therefore was described as the most outstanding athletes of the 39 stagings of the games.

== Medal summary ==
Medal winners are published by category: Boys under 20 (Junior), Girls under 20 (Junior), Boys under 17 (Youth), and Girls under 17 (Youth). Complete results can be found on the "World Junior Athletics History" website.

=== Boys under 20 (Junior) ===
Event	Gold		Silver		Bronze	
100 metres	Fabian Whymns (BAH)	10.72	George Walcott (JAM)	10.79	Tony Laguerre (GLP)	10.91
200 metres	Eric Berrie (BAR)	21.49	Fabian Whymns (BAH)	21.67	George Walcott (JAM)	21.74
400 metres	Willis Alexander (TRI)	48.02	Dennis Wallace (JAM)	48.54	Cecil White (JAM)	48.59
800 metres	Byron Francis (JAM)	1:53.34	Reuben Bayley (BAR)	1:53.87	Ian Smith (JAM)	1:54.3
1500 metres	William Johnson (BAH)	3:57.24	Byron Francis (JAM)	3:58.79	Alrick Parkin (JAM)	4:04.7
3000 metres	Gilbert Dunkley (JAM)	8:54.6	Barrington Minott (JAM)	8:57.3	Wilbur Ferdinand (TRI)	9:00.7
110 metres hurdles	B. Morris (JAM)	14.71	Paul Bowe (BAH)	14.75	Chris Thelwell (JAM)	14.88
400 metres hurdles	Colin O'Brien (TRI)	54.21	Sidney Cartwright (BAH)	56.2	Ken Gray (JAM)	57.1
High jump	Desmond Morris (JAM)	2.08	Bernard Nesbitt (BAH)	2.03	Laird McLean (TRI)	1.98
Pole vault	Michael Johnson (JAM)	3.66	Clyde McGregor (JAM)	3.50	Sidney Cartwright (BAH)	3.20
Long jump	Dwight Davis (JAM)	7.36	Anthony Phillip (BER)	7.06	Ed Stuart (BAH)	7.03
Triple jump	Don Small (BAR)	15.01	Brad Johnson (BAH)	14.89	Dorant Bartlett (BAH)	14.88
Shot put	Clyde McGregor (JAM)	15.10	James Dedier (TRI)	14.87	R. Woolridge (BER)	14.41
Discus throw	James Dedier (TRI)	48.20	Derrick Horsham (JAM)	48.06	Byron Alleyne (TRI)	45.12
Javelin throw	Sidney Cartwright (BAH)	56.76	N. Griffiths (BAR)	55.72	J. Dill (BER)	53.92
4 × 100 metres relay	Jamaica; Clyde McGregor; Chris Thelwell; George Walcott; Albert Lawrence	41.41	Bahamas	41.60	Trinidad and Tobago	41.99
4 × 400 metres relay	Bahamas	3:13.0	Trinidad and Tobago	3:14.6	Jamaica	3:17.5

=== Girls under 20 (Junior) ===
Event	Gold		Silver		Bronze	
100 metres	Raymonde Naigre (GLP)	11.77	Merlene Ottey (JAM)	11.87	Mary Ann Higgs (BAH)	11.92
200 metres	Oralee Fowler (BAH)	23.98	Merlene Ottey (JAM)	24.05	Raymonde Naigre (GLP)	24.36
400 metres	Mary Ann Higgs (BAH)	53.58	Oralee Fowler (BAH)	54.88	Fredericka Wright (JAM)	54.9
800 metres	Lavonne Roberts (BAR)	2:14.3	Eugenie Beason (JAM)	2:15.6	Marcia Tate (JAM)	2:16.0
1500 metres	Margaret Williams (JAM)	4:43.6	Sharon Powell (JAM)	4:46.5	Gina Smith (BER)	4:51.4
100 metres hurdles	Sharon Moffat (JAM)	14.77	Gina Tempro (BAR)	14.83	Monica Johnson (BER)	15.32
High jump	Agnes Riley (BAR)	1.625	Monica Johnson (BER)	1.625	Karen Turnquest (BAH)	1.625
Long jump	Audrey Llewellyn (JAM)	5.68	Alison Jones (JAM)	5.60	Agnes Riley (BAR)	5.28
Shot put	Lyn Antoine (BAH)	12.95	Sonya Smith (BER)	12.61	Marie-Josée Manette (GLP)	11.29
Discus throw	Beryl Eve (BAH)	37.94	Carol Woodside (BAH)	34.32	Ava Coombs (TRI)	33.60
Javelin throw	Sonya Smith (BER)	53.98	Carol Woodside (BAH)	41.98	Wendy Griffith (BAR)	38.96
4 × 100 metres relay	Bahamas	45.79	Jamaica; Marcia Brown; Merlene Ottey; Normalee Murray; Fredericka Wright	46.47	Barbados	46.88
4 × 400 metres relay	Bahamas	3:41.79	Jamaica; N. Gordon; Normalee Murray; Marcia Tate; Fredericka Wright	3:44.82	Trinidad and Tobago	3:57.7

=== Boys under 17 (Youth) ===
Event	Gold		Silver		Bronze	
100 metres	Thaon Jon Jones (JAM)	10.97	Kenneth Thompson (JAM)	11.03	Ruthven Prithwie (TRI)	11.34
200 metres	Thaon Jon Jones (JAM)	22.15	Kenneth Thompson (JAM)	22.17	Phil Lewis (BAH)	22.83
400 metres	Fenton Hugg (JAM)	50.08	Phil Lewis (BAH)	50.51	Richard Louis (BAR)	51.25
800 metres	Fenton Hugg (JAM)	1:57.77	Richard Taylor (JAM)	1:58.15	K. Stubbs (BAR)	1:58.43
Long jump	Thaon Jon Jones (JAM)	7.02	Lester Benjamin (ATG)	6.93	John Pugh (BAH)	6.80
Triple jump	Thaon Jon Jones (JAM)	14.77	Lester Benjamin (ATG)	14.38	Leonard Frazer (JAM)	14.08
Shot put	Earl Hamilton (BAH)	14.65	F. Daley (JAM)	14.40	Wilfred Furbert (GRN)	9.60

=== Girls under 17 (Youth) ===
Event	Gold		Silver		Bronze	
100 metres	Candy Ford (BER)	11.87	Winsome Darby (JAM)	12.03	Joanne Gardner (TRI)	12.15
200 metres	Candy Ford (BER)	24.24	Joanne Gardner (TRI)	25.01	Winsome Darby (JAM)	25.08
400 metres	Monique Millar (BAH)	56.4	Sharon Powell (JAM)	57.7	A. Knight (BAH)	58.0
800 metres	Sharon Powell (JAM)	2:14.4	Angela Boothe (JAM)	2:17.6	J. Lespere (BAH)	2:19.8
Long jump	Suzanne Durham (BER)	5.43	H. Smith (JAM)	5.42	Debbie Greene (BAH)	5.28

== Medal table (unofficial) ==
* Host nation (Jamaica)

Rank	Nation	Gold	Silver	Bronze	Total
1	Jamaica (JAM)*	18	21	11	50
2	Bahamas (BAH)	12	10	10	32
3	Barbados (BAR)	4	3	5	12
4	Bermuda (BER)	4	3	4	11
5	Trinidad and Tobago (TTO)	3	3	8	14
6	Guadeloupe (GLP)	1	0	3	4
7	Antigua and Barbuda (ATG)	0	2	0	2
8	Grenada (GRN)	0	0	1	1
Totals (8 entries)		42	42	42	126
