= 1981 CARIFTA Games =

X CARIFTA Games
- Dates: April 20–21
- Host city: Nassau, Bahamas (The Bahamas)
- Level: Junior and Youth
- Events: 48
- Participation: about 196 athletes from 16 nations

The 10th CARIFTA Games was held in Nassau, Bahamas on April 20–21, 1981. An appraisal of the results has been given on the occasion of 40th anniversary of the games.

== Participation (unofficial) ==
Detailed result lists can be found on the "World Junior Athletics History" website. An unofficial count yields the number of about 196 athletes (128 junior (under-20) and 68 youth (under-17)) from about 16 countries: Antigua and Barbuda (7), Bahamas (47), Barbados (22), Bermuda (18), British Virgin Islands (1), Cayman Islands (3), Grenada (5), Guadeloupe (11), Guyana (1), Jamaica (50), Lesser Antilles (1), Martinique (6), Saint Kitts and Nevis (2), Saint Vincent and the Grenadines (4), Trinidad and Tobago (14), US Virgin Islands (4).

== Medal summary ==
Medal winners are published by category: Boys under 20 (Junior), Girls under 20 (Junior), Boys under 17 (Youth), and Girls under 17 (Youth). Complete results can be found on the "World Junior Athletics History" website.

=== Boys under 20 (Junior) ===
| Event | Gold | | Silver | | Bronze | |
|---|---|---|---|---|---|---|
| 100 metres | Leroy Reid (JAM) | 10.5 | Lester Benjamin (ATG) | 10.6 | Finbar Pierre (TRI) | 10.7 |
| 200 metres | Scott Ferguson (TRI) | 21.06 | Leroy Reid (JAM) | 21.07 | Dennis Wallace (JAM) | 21.45 |
| 400 metres | Richard Louis (BAR) | 46.62 | David Charlton (BAH) | 46.79 | Allan Ingraham (BAH) | 47.49 |
| 800 metres | Michael Lawson (JAM) | 1:55.0 | Richard Taylor (JAM) | 1:55.1 | Ezra Catwell (BAR) | 1:56.0 |
| 1500 metres | Wilbur Ferdinand (TRI) | 3:57.82 | Maurice Williams (GRN) | 3:57.85 | Gerald Cross (JAM) | 4:03.01 |
| 5000 metres | Maurice Williams (GRN) | 14:58.23 | Wilbur Ferdinand (TRI) | 15:16.05 | Gerald Cross (JAM) | 15:20.78 |
| 110 metres hurdles | Gerald Martin (JAM) | 14.2 | Carlisle Anderson (JAM) | 14.8 | David Charlton (BAH) | 14.9 |
| 400 metres hurdles | David Charlton (BAH) | 51.8 | Ladrick Trusty (JAM) | 54.4 | Lennox Graham (JAM) | 54.7 |
| High jump | Nick Saunders (BER) | 2.18 | Steve Wray (BAH) | 2.18 | Dennis Richards (BAH) | 2.06 |
| Pole vault | Steve Wray (BAH) | 3.99 | Arvadio Ferguson (BAH) | 3.88 | Ramon Ramirez (BER) | 3.50 |
| Long jump | Adrian Jordan (BAR) | 7.21 | Brad Johnson (BAH) | 7.20 | Orde Ballantyne (VIN) | 7.10 |
| Triple jump | Lyndon Sands (BAH) | 15.64 | Lester Benjamin (ATG) | 15.28 | Brad Johnson (BAH) | 15.14 |
| Shot put | Orde Ballantyne (VIN) | 15.68 | Thierry Liveze (GLP) | 15.03 | Raleigh Ferguson (BAH) | 14.90 |
| Discus throw | Stanford Moss (BAH) | 52.64 | Allister Joseph (TRI) | 49.98 | Jeff Knowles (BAH) | 49.36 |
| Javelin throw | Brooke Onley (BER) | 63.38 | Jeff Knowles (BAH) | 56.60 | Lyndon Sands (BAH) | 56.18 |
| 4 × 100 metres relay | Jamaica; Dennis Wallace; Gerald Martin; Earle Laing; Leroy Reid | 40.9 | Bahamas | 42.2 | Barbados | 42.4 |
| 4 × 400 metres relay | Bahamas | 3:12.06 | Jamaica; Michael Lawson; Dennis Wallace; Fenton Hugg; Joseph Boyd | 3:12.06 | Trinidad and Tobago | 3:15.35 |

=== Girls under 20 (Junior) ===
| Event | Gold | | Silver | | Bronze | |
|---|---|---|---|---|---|---|
| 100 metres | Marie-France Loval (GLP) | 11.6 | Janet Burke (JAM) | 11.7 | Mary Ann Higgs (BAH) | 12.0 |
| 200 metres | Mary Ann Higgs (BAH) | 24.04 | Ruperta Charles (ATG) | 24.07 | Liliane Gaschet (MTQ) | 24.19 |
| 400 metres | Mary Ann Higgs (BAH) | 53.04 | Fredericka Wright (JAM) | 54.93 | Ruperta Charles (ATG) | 55.26 |
| 800 metres | Whelma Colebrooke (BAH) | 2:10.5 | Eugenie Beason (JAM) | 2:11.3 | Marie-Anna Filomin (GLP) | 2:11.8 |
| 1500 metres | Eugenie Beason (JAM) | 4:44.66 | Margaret Williams (JAM) | 4:48.3 | Whelma Colebrooke (BAH) | 4:58.5 |
| 3000 metres | Margaret Williams (JAM) | 10:20.97 | Daphne Fearon (JAM) | 10.26.57 | Sharon Alleyne (TRI) | 10:48.6 |
| 100 metres hurdles | Karlene Allen (JAM) | 14.9 | Debbie Greene (BAH) | 15.1 | Marjorie Knight (JAM) | 15.3 |
| High jump | Charline Scaron (MTQ) | 1.75 | Elna Vignerol (GLP) | 1.73 | Sharon Rose (BAH) | 1.70 |
| Long jump | Ingrid Boyce (BAR) | 5.74 | Cynthia Henry (JAM) | 5.64 | Debbie Greene (BAH) | 5.61 |
| Shot put | Jean-Claire Chathuant (GLP) | 13.36 | Sonya Smith (BER) | 12.39 | Marlene Lewis (JAM) | 11.36 |
| Discus throw | Kathy Bartlett (BAH) | 38.92 | Carol Woodside (BAH) | 38.48 | Sonya Smith (BER) | 35.74 |
| Javelin throw | Sonya Smith (BER) | 52.38 | Marie Bertimon (GLP) | 46.48 | Mary Brewster (BAR) | 43.10 |
| 4 × 100 metres relay | Bahamas | 46.36 | Jamaica; Cynthia Henry; Fredericka Wright; Karlene Allen; Janet Burke | 46.69 | Antigua and Barbuda | 46.84 |
| 4 × 400 metres relay | Bahamas | 3:42.7 | Antigua and Barbuda; Genevieve Joseph; Ruperta Charles; Terry Juliens; Jocelyn Joseph | 3:45.5 | Barbados | 3:46.2 |

=== Boys under 17 (Youth) ===
| Event | Gold | | Silver | | Bronze | |
|---|---|---|---|---|---|---|
| 100 metres | Ray Stewart (JAM) | 10.9 | Ian Esson (JAM) | 11.0 | Rosan Rauzduel (GLP) | 11.2 |
| 200 metres | Ray Stewart (JAM) | 22.32 | Rosan Rauzduel (GLP) | 22.34 | Nigel Clarke (BAR) | 22.56 |
| 400 metres | Paul Henry (JAM) | 49.69 | Norman Pottinger (JAM) | 49.93 | Victor Jordan (BAR) | 50.44 |
| 800 metres | Donville Buchanan (JAM) | 1:59.4 | Winston Matthews (JAM) | 2:00.5 | Deryck Codrington (BAR) | 2:02.1 |
| High jump | Troy Glasgow (BER) | 1.93 | Donville Buchanan (JAM) | 1.93 | Troy Kemp (BAH) | 1.88 |
| Long jump | Edmund Moxey (BAH) | 6.61 | Andre Brown (JAM) | 6.58 | Lauren Stewart (BER) | 6.45 |
| Triple jump | Lauren Stewart (BER) | 14.21 | Devon Dixon (JAM) | 13.78 | Fritz Knowles (BAH) | 13.68 |
| Shot put | Lavelle Hamilton (BAH) | 14.57 | Georges Robin (GLP) | 14.51 | Gwyn Jones (JAM) | 14.04 |
| Javelin throw | Leslie Patterson (BAR) | 53.52 | Jefferson Stubbs (BAH) | 52.40 | Lavelle Hamilton (BAH) | 46.64 |

=== Girls under 17 (Youth) ===
| Event | Gold | | Silver | | Bronze | |
|---|---|---|---|---|---|---|
| 100 metres | Candy Ford (BER) | 11.7 | Camille Coates (JAM) | 11.8 | Maxine McMillan (TRI) | 12.0 |
| 200 metres | Candy Ford (BER) | 24.12 | Maxine McMillan (TRI) | 24.40 | Eldece Clarke (BAH) | 24.80 |
| 400 metres | Candy Ford (BER) | 55.3 | Veronica Williams (JAM) | 55.5 | Rosemarie Bailey (JAM) | 55.8 |
| 800 metres | Bernardette John (TRI) | 2:12.5 | Sharon Powell (JAM) | 2:14.7 | Roxanne Vincent (TRI) | 2:15.4 |
| High jump | Mazel Thomas (JAM) | 1.62 | Janelle Kelly (TRI) | 1.60 | Donna Smith (BAH) | 1.52 |
| Long jump | Dalsis Billet (JAM) | 5.52 | Janine Tabar (GLP) | 5.43 | Donna Smith (BAH) | 5.37 |
| Shot put | Laverne Eve (BAH) | 13.27 | Jacqueline Kennedy (BER) | 10.05 | Minez Cargill (BAH) | 9.73 |
| Javelin throw | Laverne Eve (BAH) | 39.94 | Angela Hinds (BAR) | 35.14 | Monique Millar (BAH) | 34.72 |

== Medal table (unofficial) ==
* Host nation (Bahamas)

| Rank | Nation | Gold | Silver | Bronze | Total |
|---|---|---|---|---|---|
| 1 | Bahamas (BAH)* | 15 | 9 | 19 | 43 |
| 2 | Jamaica (JAM) | 13 | 21 | 8 | 42 |
| 3 | Bermuda (BER) | 8 | 2 | 3 | 13 |
| 4 | Barbados (BAR) | 4 | 1 | 7 | 12 |
| 5 | Trinidad and Tobago (TTO) | 3 | 4 | 5 | 12 |
| 6 | Guadeloupe (GLP) | 2 | 6 | 2 | 10 |
| 7 | Grenada (GRN) | 1 | 1 | 0 | 2 |
| 8 | Martinique (MTQ) | 1 | 0 | 1 | 2 |
| 8 | Saint Vincent and the Grenadines (VIN) | 1 | 0 | 1 | 2 |
| 10 | Antigua and Barbuda (ATG) | 0 | 4 | 2 | 6 |
| Totals (10 entries) | | 48 | 48 | 48 | 144 |
