= 1978 CARIFTA Games =

VII CARIFTA Games
- Dates: March 27–28
- Host city: Nassau, Bahamas (The Bahamas)
- Level: Junior and Youth
- Events: 39
- Participation: about 86 athletes from 12 nations

The 7th CARIFTA Games was held in Nassau, Bahamas on March 27–28, 1978.

== Participation (unofficial) ==
Detailed result lists can be found on the "World Junior Athletics History" website. An unofficial count yields the number of about 88 athletes (66 junior (under-20) and 22 youth (under-17)) from about 13 countries: Anguilla (2), Antigua and Barbuda (2), Bahamas (19), Barbados (13), Bermuda (6), British Virgin Islands (1), Guadeloupe (2), Guyana (1), Jamaica (31), Martinique (1), Saint Vincent and the Grenadines (1), Trinidad and Tobago (8), Turks and Caicos Islands (1).

== Austin Sealy Award ==
The Austin Sealy Trophy was awardeded to Mary Ann Higgs from the Bahamas. She won 2 gold (100m and 200m), and 1 silver (400m) medal in the youth (U-17) category.

== Medal summary ==
Medal winners are published by category: Boys under 20 (Junior), Girls under 20 (Junior), Boys under 17 (Youth), and Girls under 17 (Youth). Complete results can be found on the "World Junior Athletics History" website.

=== Boys under 20 (Junior) ===
Event	Gold		Silver		Bronze	
100 metres (4.5 m/s)	Eric Berrie (BAR)	10.69w	Rickey Moxey (BAH)	10.70w	Fabian Whymns (BAH)	11.01w
200 metres	Eric Berrie (BAR)	21.94	Clive Lawrence (JAM)	22.33	Dave Harewood (BAR)	22.44
400 metres	Nelson Hunter (JAM)	49.23	Dean Greenaway (IVB)	49.69	Roydel Russell (JAM)	50.05
800 metres	Donat Mair (JAM)	1:56.1	Raymond Panther (JAM)	1:56.2	Anselm LeBourne (TRI)	1:56.9
1500 metres	Andrew Browne (TRI)	4:07.9	William Johnson (BAH)	4:08.61	Vernon Steele (JAM)	4:08.62
3000 metres	Lloyd Evering (JAM)	9:04.31	William Johnson (BAH)	9:05.75	Vernon Steele (JAM)	9:11.65
110 metres hurdles (4.1 m/s)	John Messam (JAM)	14.80w	Rickey Davis (BAH)	15.36w	William Gittens (BAR)	15.57w
400 metres hurdles	Frank Baptiste (BAR)	55.30	Colin O'Brien (TRI)	56.39	Greg Rolle (BAH)	57.40
High jump	Desmond Morris (JAM)	1.98	Laird McLean (TRI)	1.905	Curtis Charles (BER)	1.905
Pole vault	Archie Johnson (BAH)	4.11	Herbert Oembler (BAH)	3.67	Michael Johnson (JAM)	3.35
Long jump	Alfred Browne (ATG)	6.97	Dwight Davis (JAM)	6.90	J. Graham (BAR)	6.88
Triple jump	Alfred Browne (ATG)	14.06	Dwight Davis (JAM)	13.98	C. Haynes (BAR)	13.90
Shot put	Roy Alfred (TRI)	16.13	Alvin Edgecombe (BAH)	15.24	Anthony McKenzie (BAH)	14.78
Discus throw	Stanley Goodridge (JAM)	50.68	Roy Alfred (TRI)	47.90	Alvin Edgecombe (BAH)	47.72
Javelin throw	J. Dill (BER)	51.72	D. Gale (BAR)	51.40	André Taylor (TCA)	49.84
4 × 100 metres relay	Jamaica	42.69	Bahamas	43.06	Trinidad and Tobago	43.52
4 × 400 metres relay	Jamaica	3:21.18	Trinidad and Tobago	3:21.77	Bahamas	3:26.42

=== Girls under 20 (Junior) ===
Event	Gold		Silver		Bronze	
100 metres	Doreen Small (JAM)	11.78w	Raymonde Naigre (GLP)	11.94w	Esther Hope (TRI)	12.02w
200 metres	Jackie Pusey (JAM)	24.13	Raymonde Naigre (GLP)	24.79	Oralee Fowler (BAH)	25.04
400 metres	Jackie Pusey (JAM)	55.85	Oralee Fowler (BAH)	56.53	S. Gooding (BAR)	58.13
800 metres	Eugenie Beason (JAM)	2:16.9	Serene Mitchell (JAM)	2:19.8	Yvonne Sturrup (BAH)	2:20.6
1500 metres	Serene Mitchell (JAM)	4:52.14	Eugenie Beason (JAM)	4:54.54	Theodora Corea (VIN)	5:03.15
100 metres hurdles	Doreen Small (JAM)	15.94	Gina Tempro (BAR)	15.99	Grace Jackson (JAM)	16.56
High jump	Monica Johnson (BER)	1.625	Mireille Lejuste (MTQ)	1.625	Agnes Riley (BAR)	1.625
Long jump	Jennifer Inniss (GUY)	6.33w	Sharol Henry (JAM)	6.12	Elaine Roach (BAH)	5.57
Shot put	Lyn Antoine (BAH)	13.45	Sonya Smith (BER)	11.95	Marie-Josée Coquin (GLP)	11.89
Discus throw	Beryl Bethel (BAH)	43.38	Phyllis Robinson (JAM)	33.48	Marie-Josée Coquin (GLP)	33.00
Javelin throw	Sonya Smith (BER)	46.44	Beryl Bethel (BAH)	36.62	Jessica Nichols (BAR)	35.92
4 × 100 metres relay	Jamaica; Marlene Lewin; Normalee Murray; Doreen Small; Jackie Pusey	46.49	Bahamas	47.73	Bermuda	47.74
4 × 400 metres relay	Jamaica; M. Cole; Fredericka Wright; Normalee Murray; Jackie Pusey	3:51.54	Bahamas	3:59.52	Barbados	4:09.75

=== Boys under 17 (Youth) ===
Event	Gold		Silver		Bronze	
100 metres (4.5 m/s)	Wayne Morrison (JAM)	11.07w	Kenneth Thompson (JAM)	11.10w	Ron Sobers (TRI)	11.35w
200 metres (-1.1 m/s)	Kenneth Thompson (JAM)	22.48	Ron Sobers (TRI)	22.64	Dennis Wallace (JAM)	22.87
400 metres	Dennis Wallace (JAM)	50.08	Lonsdale Demming (TRI)	51.06	David Charlton (BAH)	51.15
Long jump	Brunell Swan (BER)	6.63	Brad Johnson (BAH)	6.54	Thaon Jon Jones (JAM)	6.51
Triple jump	Norbert Elliott (BAH)	14.48	Lester Benjamin (ATG)	14.11	Thaon Jon Jones (JAM)	13.95

=== Girls under 17 (Youth) ===
Event	Gold		Silver		Bronze	
100 metres (-0.1 m/s)	Mary Ann Higgs (BAH)	12.32	Marcia Brown (JAM)	12.38	Juliet Cuthbert (JAM)	12.38
200 metres (3.9 m/s)	Mary Ann Higgs (BAH)	24.44w	Monique Millar (BAH)	24.87w	Esme Austin (BAR)	25.24w
400 metres	Fredericka Wright (JAM)	55.88	Mary Ann Higgs (BAH)	55.99	Monique Millar (BAH)	56.44
Long jump	Pamela Alleyne (BAR)	5.33	D. Samuel (BER)	5.28	Y. Cole (JAM)	5.27

== Medal table (unofficial) ==
* Host nation (Bahamas)

Rank	Nation	Gold	Silver	Bronze	Total
1	Jamaica (JAM)	20	10	10	40
2	Bahamas (BAH)*	6	14	10	30
3	Barbados (BAR)	4	2	9	15
4	Bermuda (BER)	4	2	2	8
5	Trinidad and Tobago (TTO)	2	6	4	12
6	Antigua and Barbuda (ATG)	2	1	0	3
7	Guyana (GUY)	1	0	0	1
8	Guadeloupe (GLP)	0	2	2	4
9	British Virgin Islands (IVB)	0	1	0	1
9	Martinique (MTQ)	0	1	0	1
11	Saint Vincent and the Grenadines (VIN)	0	0	1	1
11	Turks and Caicos Islands (TKS)	0	0	1	1
Totals (12 entries)		39	39	39	117
