= 1977 CARIFTA Games =

VI CARIFTA Games
- Dates: April 25–26
- Host city: Bridgetown, Barbados
- Level: Junior and Youth
- Events: 39
- Participation: about 114 athletes from 13 nations

The 6th CARIFTA Games was held in Bridgetown, Barbados on April 25–26, 1977. For the first time, the Austin Sealy Award was presented to the athlete adjudged the most outstanding, either in terms of record accomplishment, or quality of performance as compared to other top medallists.

== Participation (unofficial) ==
Detailed result lists can be found on the "World Junior Athletics History" website. An unofficial count yields the number of about 114 athletes (84 junior (under-20) and 30 youth (under-17)) from about 13 countries: Antigua and Barbuda (1), Bahamas (19), Barbados (19), Bermuda (11), Guadeloupe (4), Guyana (3), Jamaica (34), Lesser Antilles (1), Martinique (6), Saint Christopher-Nevis-Anguilla (2), Saint Vincent and the Grenadines (1), Trinidad and Tobago (12), US Virgin Islands (1).

== Austin Sealy Award ==
For the first time, the Austin Sealy Trophy was awarded. The recipient was Debbie Jones from Bermuda. This year, she won 2 gold (100 m and 200 m), 1 silver (400 m), and 1 bronze medal (4 × 100 m relay). Until then, she was the most successful athlete in the championships winning a total of 12 gold, 7 silver, and 2 bronze medals between 1973 and 1977.

== Medal summary ==
Medal winners are published by category: Boys under 20 (Junior), Girls under 20 (Junior), Boys under 17 (Youth), Girls under 17 (Youth). Complete results can be found on the "World Junior Athletics History" website.

=== Boys under 20 (Junior) ===
Event	Gold		Silver		Bronze	
100 metres	Hermann Panzo (MTQ)	10.68	Gregory Simons (BER)	10.69	Delroy Morrison (JAM)	10.95
200 metres	Gregory Simons (BER)	21.10	Vaughn Harvey (BER)	21.24	Delroy Morrison (JAM)	21.27
400 metres	Clyde Edwards (BAR)	47.68	Oliver Heywood (JAM)	48.13	Vaughn Harvey (BER)	48.31
800 metres	Ronald Forde (BAR)	1:54.82	Anthony Williams (BAH)	1:54.91	Leroy Robinson (JAM)	1:55.58
1500 metres	Michael Watson (BER)	4:04.30	Ronald Forde (BAR)	4:05.69	Errol Weston (TRI)	4:10.60
3000 metres	Michael Watson (BER)	8:54.38	Errol Weston (TRI)	9:00.02	Tyrone James (VIN)	9:23.03
110 metres hurdles	Karl Smith (JAM)	14.45	Jocelyn Wynter (JAM)	14.63	William Gittens (BAR)	15.08
400 metres hurdles	Jocelyn Wynter (JAM)	55.20	Paul Wynter (JAM)	55.45	Frank Baptiste (BAR)	55.54
High jump	Bryan Wilson (JAM)	1.98	Desmond Morris (JAM)	1.98	Mortimer Stirling (BER)	1.94
Pole vault	Andrew Christian (ATG)	3.51	Ricardo Lightbourne (BAH)	3.25	Herbert Oembler (BAH)	3.25
Long jump	Steve Hanna (BAH)	7.35	Ken Brimmer (BER)	7.13	J. Graham (BAR)	7.13
Triple jump	Steve Hanna (BAH)	15.41	Ken Brimmer (BER)	14.87	Alfred Browne (ATG)	14.44
Shot put	Tex Innerarity (JAM)	15.36	Edward Constantine (JAM)	15.04	Hugh Downes (BAR)	14.08
Discus throw	Stanley Goodridge (JAM)	49.08	Alvin Edgecombe (BAH)	44.94	Tex Innerarity (JAM)	44.62
Javelin throw	Hugh Downes (BAR)	58.34	Godfrey Hinds (BAR)	56.08	Stokeley Dean (TRI)	54.48
4 × 100 metres relay	Jamaica; Delroy Morrison; Karl Smith; Mitchum Burris; Oliver Heywood	41.40	Bermuda	42.32	Bahamas	43.65
4 × 400 metres relay	Jamaica; Paul Wynter; Ian Stapleton; Oliver Heywood; Mitchum Burris	3:14.37	Bahamas	3:16.55	Trinidad and Tobago	3:18.13

=== Girls under 20 (Junior) ===
Event	Gold		Silver		Bronze	
100 metres	Debbie Jones (BER)	11.77	Maureen Gottshalk (JAM)	11.87	Doreen Small (JAM)	12.13
200 metres	Debbie Jones (BER)	23.49	Maureen Gottshalk (JAM)	23.50	Raymonde Naigre (GLP)	24.50
400 metres	Jackie Pusey (JAM)	54.00	Debbie Jones (BER)	54.22	Verone Webber (JAM)	56.63
800 metres	Reva Knight (JAM)	2:16.07	Jennifer Gibson (BAR)	2:18.86	Waveney Benn (GUY)	2:19.95
1500 metres	Jennifer Gibson (BAR)	4:49.56	Jennifer Brown (JAM)	4:51.77	Lavonne Roberts (BAR)	4:52.82
100 metres hurdles	Ann Adams (TRI)	14.15	Uris Gooding (BAR)	14.60	Sharon Moffat (JAM)	14.64
High jump	Jacqueline Angus (JAM)	1.68	Monica Johnson (BER)	1.64	Marie Gill (BAR)	1.64
Long jump	Sharol Henry (JAM)	5.90	Jennifer Swanston (BAR)	5.77	Jennifer Inniss (GUY)	5.50
Shot put	Lucy Russel (BAH)	12.04	Sonya Smith (BER)	11.57	Christiane Mamie (GLP)	11.38
Discus throw	Beryl Bethel (BAH)	40.24	Florence Sharpe (BER)	34.76	Rosemary Grant (BAH)	33.28
Javelin throw	Sonya Smith (BER)	39.84	Jessica Nichols (BAR)	37.66	Jennifer Forde (BAR)	35.16
4 × 100 metres relay	Jamaica; Maureen Gottshalk; Normalee Murray; Verone Webber; Doreen Small	46.44	Trinidad and Tobago	46.70	Bermuda	46.90
4 × 400 metres relay	Jamaica; Fredericka Wright; Reva Knight; Verone Webber; Maureen Gottshalk	3:46.33	Trinidad and Tobago	3:50.51	Barbados	3:54.35

=== Boys under 17 (Youth) ===
Event	Gold		Silver		Bronze	
100 metres	Pierre-Léon Agat (MTQ)	11.12	Alex Rémir (MTQ)	11.32	V. Lewis (GUY)	11.39
200 metres	Richard Lee (JAM)	21.96	Wainsworth Small (JAM)	22.02	Alex Cox (MTQ)	22.02
400 metres	V. Lewis (GUY)	50.1	Lonsdale Demming (TRI)	50.4	(Saint Christopher-Nevis-Anguilla) D. Frank (SKN)	50.6
Long jump	Desmond Morris (JAM)	6.81	G. Braithwaite (BAR)	6.52	S. Batet (MTQ)	6.46
Triple jump	Norbert Elliott (BAH)	14.10	G. Braithwaite (BAR)	13.44	E. Lockhart (BAH)	13.15

=== Girls under 17 (Youth) ===
Event	Gold		Silver		Bronze	
100 metres	Monica Brown (JAM)	12.31	Donna Burgess (BER)	12.43	Rebecca Roberts (TRI)	12.44
200 metres	Oralee Fowler (BAH)	24.32w?	Donna Burgess (BER)	24.60w?	Donna Listrop (TRI)	24.68w?
400 metres	Fredericka Wright (JAM)	56.57	Yvonne Joseph (TRI)	56.59	Yvette Joseph (TRI)	56.70
Long jump	Sharol Henry (JAM)	5.91	Sonia Clarke (BAR)	5.44	Fran Gané (GLP)	5.39

== Medal table (unofficial) ==
* Host nation (Barbados)

Rank	Nation	Gold	Silver	Bronze	Total
1	Jamaica (JAM)	18	9	7	34
2	Bermuda (BER)	6	11	3	20
3	Bahamas (BAH)	6	4	4	14
4	Barbados (BAR)*	4	9	8	21
5	Martinique (MTQ)	2	1	2	5
6	Trinidad and Tobago (TTO)	1	5	6	12
7	Guyana (GUY)	1	0	3	4
8	Antigua and Barbuda (ATG)	1	0	1	2
9	Guadeloupe (GLP)	0	0	3	3
10	Saint Christopher-Nevis-Anguilla (SCN)	0	0	1	1
10	Saint Vincent and the Grenadines (VIN)	0	0	1	1
Totals (11 entries)		39	39	39	117
