= Sonia Smith =

Bermudan javelin thrower

Personal information
- Nationality: Bermudian
- Born: 19 September 1962 (age 63)
- Education: Abilene Christian University
- Height: 1.78 m (5 ft 10 in)
- Weight: 90 kg (198 lb)

Sport
- Sport: Athletics
- Event: Javelin throw
- College team: Abilene Christian Wildcats

Sonia Smith (born 19 September 1962) is a Bermudian athlete. She competed in the women's javelin throw at the 1984 Summer Olympics.

Her personal best in the javelin throw is 55.98 metres set in 1984.

== International competitions ==
| Year | Competition | Venue | Position | Event | Notes |
Representing Bermuda
| 1976 | CARIFTA Games (U20) | Nassau, Bahamas | 2nd | 100 m hurdles | 15.0 s |
| 1976 | CARIFTA Games (U20) | Nassau, Bahamas | 3rd | Long jump | 5.53 m |
| 1976 | CARIFTA Games (U20) | Nassau, Bahamas | 2nd | Long jump (U17) | 5.59 m |
| 1977 | CARIFTA Games (U20) | Bridgetown, Barbados | 2nd | Shot put | 11.57 m |
| 1977 | CARIFTA Games (U20) | Bridgetown, Barbados | 1st | Javelin throw | 39.84 m |
| 1977 | Central American and Caribbean Championships | Xalapa, Mexico | 3rd | Javelin throw | 46.72 m |
| 1978 | CARIFTA Games (U20) | Nassau, Bahamas | 2nd | Shot put | 11.95 m |
| 1978 | CARIFTA Games (U20) | Nassau, Bahamas | 1st | Javelin throw | 46.44 m |
| 1978 | Commonwealth Games | Edmonton, Canada | 11th | Javelin throw | 39.34 m |
| 1979 | CARIFTA Games (U20) | Kingston, Jamaica | 2nd | Shot put | 12.61 m |
| 1979 | CARIFTA Games (U20) | Kingston, Jamaica | 1st | Javelin throw | 53.98 m |
| 1979 | Pan American Games | San Juan, Puerto Rico | 7th | Javelin throw | 46.54 m |
| 1980 | CARIFTA Games (U20) | Hamilton, Bermuda | 3rd | Shot put | 11.60 m |
| 1980 | CARIFTA Games (U20) | Hamilton, Bermuda | 1st | Javelin throw | 47.52 m |
| 1980 | Central American and Caribbean; Junior Championships (U20) | Nassau, Bahamas | 1st | Shot put | 11.80 m |
| 1980 | Central American and Caribbean; Junior Championships (U20) | Nassau, Bahamas | 1st | Javelin throw | 47.58 m |
| 1980 | Pan American Junior Championships | Sudbury, Canada | 6th | Shot put | 11.40 m |
| 1980 | Pan American Junior Championships | Sudbury, Canada | 3rd | Javelin throw | 49.50 m |
| 1981 | CARIFTA Games (U20) | Nassau, Bahamas | 2nd | Shot put | 12.39 m |
| 1981 | CARIFTA Games (U20) | Nassau, Bahamas | 3rd | Discus throw | 35.74 m |
| 1981 | CARIFTA Games (U20) | Nassau, Bahamas | 1st | Javelin throw | 52.38 m |
| 1981 | Central American and Caribbean Championships | Santo Domingo, Dominican Republic | 3rd | Javelin throw | 46.84 m |
| 1982 | Central American and Caribbean Games | Havana, Cuba | 8th | Javelin throw | 34.22 m |
| 1983 | Universiade | Edmonton, Canada | 12th | Shot put | 12.16 m |
| 1983 | Universiade | Edmonton, Canada | 10th | Javelin throw | 49.58 m |
| 1984 | Olympic Games | Los Angeles, United States | 20th (q) | Javelin throw | 52.74 m |
| 1985 | Central American and Caribbean Championships | Nassau, Bahamas | 3rd | Javelin throw | 49.44 m |
