= Athletics at the 1983 Pan American Games – Men's 100 metres =

Men's 100 metres at the Pan American Games

The men's 100 metres event at the 1983 Pan American Games was held in Caracas, Venezuela on 23 and 24 August.

== Medalists ==
Gold	Silver	Bronze
Leandro Peñalver; Cuba	Sam Graddy; United States	Osvaldo Lara; Cuba

Juan Núñez of the Dominican Republic had originally won the silver, however, at the competition he tested positive for a banned stimulant fencamfamine and was stripped of his medal.

== Results ==
=== Heats ===
Wind:
Heat 1: -2.6 m/s, Heat 2: -2.4 m/s, Heat 3: -2.5 m/s

Rank	Heat	Name	Nationality	Time	Notes
1	2	Leandro Peñalver	Cuba	10.41	Q
1	3	Osvaldo Lara	Cuba	10.41	Q
3	1	Ben Johnson	Canada	10.49	Q
4	1	Sam Graddy	United States	10.50	Q
~~5~~	2	Juan Núñez	Dominican Republic	~~10.51~~	Q
5	1	Ray Stewart	Jamaica	10.55	Q
6	3	Desai Williams	Canada	10.58	Q
7	3	Christopher Brathwaite	Trinidad and Tobago	10.58	Q
8	2	Nelson dos Santos	Brazil	10.62	Q
9	1	Wilfredo Almonte	Dominican Republic	10.68	Q
10	2	Hipolito Brown	Venezuela	10.68	Q
11	3	Ken Robinson	United States	10.69	Q
12	2	Everard Samuels	Jamaica	10.71	Q
13	3	Neville Hodge	United States Virgin Islands	10.73	Q
14	3	Florencio Aguilar	Panama	10.81	q
15	3	Ángel Andrade	Venezuela	10.90	
16	1	Luis Schneider	Chile	11.01	Q
17	2	Calvin Greenaway	Antigua and Barbuda	11.14	
18	1	Katsuhiko Nakaya	Brazil	12.93	
	1	Lester Benjamin	Antigua and Barbuda	DNS	

=== Semifinals ===
Wind:
Heat 1: -1.5 m/s, Heat 2: -1.4 m/s

Rank	Heat	Name	Nationality	Time	Notes
1	1	Leandro Peñalver	Cuba	10.16	Q
2	1	Sam Graddy	United States	10.30	Q
3	1	Ray Stewart	Jamaica	10.31	Q
4	2	Ben Johnson	Canada	10.32	Q
5	1	Desai Williams	Canada	10.34	q
6	2	Osvaldo Lara	Cuba	10.35	Q
7	1	Nelson dos Santos	Brazil	10.43	q
~~8~~	2	Juan Núñez	Dominican Republic	~~10.52~~	Q
8	2	Christopher Brathwaite	Trinidad and Tobago	10.53	
9	2	Everard Samuels	Jamaica	10.53	
10	1	Wilfredo Almonte	Dominican Republic	10.57	
11	2	Ken Robinson	United States	10.62	
12	2	Hipólito Brown	Venezuela	10.65	
13	1	Neville Hodge	United States Virgin Islands	10.73	
14	1	Florencio Aguilar	Panama	10.74	
15	2	Luis Schneider	Chile	10.75	

=== Final ===
Wind: +2.0 m/s

Rank	Name	Nationality	Time	Notes
1st place, gold medalist(s)	Leandro Peñalver	Cuba	10.06	GR, PB
~~2~~	Juan Núñez	Dominican Republic	~~10.14~~	DQ
2nd place, silver medalist(s)	Sam Graddy	United States	10.18	
3rd place, bronze medalist(s)	Osvaldo Lara	Cuba	10.21	
4	Ray Stewart	Jamaica	10.22	
5	Ben Johnson	Canada	10.25	
6	Nelson dos Santos	Brazil	10.35	
	Desai Williams	Canada	DNS	
