= 1980 Central American and Caribbean Junior Championships in Athletics =

IV Central American and Caribbean Junior Championships
- Dates: 22–25 August
- Host city: Nassau, Bahamas (The Bahamas)
- Level: Junior and Youth
- Events: 73 (37 junior, 36 youth)
- Participation: about 263 (150 junior, 113 youth) athletes from 15 nations

The 4th Central American and Caribbean Junior Championships was held in Nassau, Bahamas, on 22–25 August 1980.

== Medal summary ==
Medal winners are published by category: Junior A, Male, Junior A, Female, and Junior B. Complete results can be found on the World Junior Athletics History website.

=== Male Junior A (under 20) ===
| Event | Gold | | Silver | | Bronze | |
|---|---|---|---|---|---|---|
| 100 metres | Scott Ferguson (TRI) | 10.4 | Leroy Reid (JAM) | 10.8 | Gary Hitchins (TRI) | 10.9 |
| 200 metres | Leroy Reid (JAM) | 21.1 | Scott Ferguson (TRI) | 21.7 | Ron Sobers (TRI) | 21.8 |
| 400 metres | Rubén Díaz (PUR) | 48.4 | Phil Lewis (BAH) | 48.5 | Oswaldo Zea (VEN) | 48.8 |
| 800 metres | Luis Lizardi (VEN) | 1:54.4 | Ángel Román (VEN) | 1:55.2 | Steve Wright (BAH) | 1:55.9 |
| 1500 metres | Arturo Barrios (MEX) | 3:49.8 | José Castillo (VEN) | 3:49.9 | Ángel Román (VEN) | 3:51.1 |
| 5000 metres | Arturo Barrios (MEX) | 14:26.4 | Jesús Herrera (MEX) | 14:27.4 | Wilbur Ferdinand (TRI) | 15:21.8 |
| 10,000 metres | Arturo Barrios (MEX) | 31:20.4 | Alonso Reyes (VEN) | 31:46.5 | Alfonso Cara (MEX) | 32:11.4 |
| 3000 metres steeplechase | Jesús Herrera (MEX) | 9:27.8 | José Martínez (VEN) | 9:34.8 | Héctor Arroyo (PUR) | 9:38.5 |
| 110 metres hurdles | Modesto Castillo (DOM) | 14.0 | Rodrigo Casar (MEX) | 14.5 | Wilfredo Santiago (PUR) | 14.7 |
| 400 metres hurdles | Wilfredo Santiago (PUR) | 53.4 | Ladrick Trusty (JAM) | 54.6 | John Pugh (BAH) | 54.7 |
| High jump | Stephen Wray (BAH) | 2.21 | Delroy Poyser (JAM) | 2.06 | Juan Morales (PUR) | 2.00 |
| Pole vault | Edgardo Villalobos (MEX) | 4.01 | Stephen Wray (BAH) | 3.80 | Arvadio Ferguson (BAH) | 3.10 |
| Long jump | Lester Benjamin (ATG) | 7.01 | Aurelio Rivera (PUR) | 6.98 | Juan González (MEX) | 6.62 |
| Triple jump | Brad Johnson (BAH) | 15.27 | Norbert Elliott (BAH) | 15.16 | Francisco Olivares (MEX) | 15.01 |
| Shot put | Joaquín Vila (PUR) | 16.32 | Allister Joseph (TRI) | 15.37 | Allan Silber (PUR) | 15.15 |
| Discus throw | Allister Joseph (TRI) | 40.94 | Alexis Lynch (BAH) | 39.98 | Alberto Romero (MEX) | 39.68 |
| Hammer throw | Felipe Martín (MEX) | 54.56 | Guillermo Ramírez (MEX) | 53.34 | Luis Colón (PUR) | 49.86 |
| Javelin throw | Héctor Hemmings (PAN) | 60.28 | Frank Elías (PUR) | 55.58 | Javier Irizarry (PUR) | 54.38 |
| Decathlon | Rafael López (PUR) | 6470 | José Aguirre (VEN) | 6470 | Juan Sánchez (MEX) | 5174 |
| 10,000 metres track walk | Eduardo Linares (MEX) | 45:04.1 | Víctor Sánchez (MEX) | 47:12.0 | Ramón Muñiz (PUR) | 48:06.4 |
| 4 × 100 metres relay | Jamaica | 42.1 | Venezuela | 42.4 | Trinidad and Tobago | 42.4 |
| 4 × 400 metres relay | Puerto Rico | 3:14.9 | Venezuela | 3:15.3 | Jamaica | 3:18.0 |

=== Female Junior A (under 20) ===
| Event | Gold | | Silver | | Bronze | |
|---|---|---|---|---|---|---|
| 100 metres | Ruperta Charles (ATG) | 11.9 | Janet Burke (JAM) | 12.1 | Alma Vázquez (MEX) | 12.3 |
| 200 metres | Ruperta Charles (ATG) | 24.5 | Janet Burke (JAM) | 24.9 | Alma Vázquez (MEX) | 25.5 |
| 400 metres | Cathy Rattray (JAM) | 54.6 | Stephanie Farrington (BAH) | 56.4 | Ruperta Charles (ATG) | 56.7 |
| 800 metres | Marta Vázquez (MEX) | 2:15.7 | Whelma Colebrooke (BAH) | 2:18.1 | Jovita Guerrero (MEX) | 2:18.2 |
| 1500 metres | Marta Vázquez (MEX) | 4:44.5 | Irma Núñez (MEX) | 4:45.2 | Carmen Flores (CRC) | 4:50.4 |
| 100 metres hurdles | Myrtle Chester (GUY) | 14.7 | Angie Marie Regis (VEN) | 15.0 | Sandra Taváres (MEX) | 15.4 |
| 400 metres hurdles | Myrtle Chester (GUY) | 62.7 | Stephanie Farrington (BAH) | 64.6 | Natasha Rolle (BAH) | 64.9 |
| High jump | Sharon Rose (BAH) | 1.69 | Myrtle Chester (GUY) | 1.69 | Amalia Montes (MEX) | 1.67 |
| Long jump | Ruperta Charles (ATG) | 5.68 | Myrtle Chester (GUY) | 5.41 | Sorelis Bohórquez (VEN) | 5.30 |
| Shot put | Sonia Smith (BER) | 11.80 | Mónica Ávalos (MEX) | 10.95 | Carol Woodside (BAH) | 10.56 |
| Discus throw | Mónica Ávalos (MEX) | 42.20 | Yunaira Piña (VEN) | 40.08 | Carol Woodside (BAH) | 39.62 |
| Javelin throw | Sonia Smith (BER) | 47.58 | Marieta Riera (VEN) | 44.06 | Yunaira Piña (VEN) | 41.68 |
| Pentathlon | Myrtle Chester (GUY) | 3696 | Stephanie Farrington (BAH) | 3029 | Debbie Greene (BAH) | 3009 |
| 4 × 100 metres relay | Mexico | 48.6 | Bahamas | 49.2 | Puerto Rico | 50.1 |
| 4 × 400 metres relay | Mexico | 3:50.8 | Bahamas | 3:53.3 | Puerto Rico | 4:11.7 |

=== Male Junior B (under 17) ===
| Event | Gold | | Silver | | Bronze | |
|---|---|---|---|---|---|---|
| 100 metres | Anthony Munroe (TRI) | 10.6 | Earle Laing (JAM) | 10.9 | Kent Tacklyn (BER) | 11.1 |
| 200 metres | Anthony Munroe (TRI) | 22.0 | Earle Laing (JAM) | 22.3 | Kent Tacklyn (BER) | 22.5 |
| 400 metres | Carlyle Bernard (TRI) | 49.1 | Aaron Phillips (VEN) | 49.4 | Richard Louis (BAR) | 49.7 |
| 800 metres | Aaron Phillips (VEN) | 1:57.8 | Carlyle Bernard (TRI) | 1:57.9 | Abdiel Cartagena (PUR) | 1:58.7 |
| 1200 metres | Rubén Rivera (PUR) | 3:09.5 | Carlos Guzmán (VEN) | 3:10.4 | Hugo Allan García (GUA) | 3:11.5 |
| 3000 metres | Rubén Rivera (PUR) | 8:51.2 | Waldemar Sotillo (PUR) | 8:52.4 | Hugo Allan García (GUA) | 8:53.4 |
| 2000 metres steeplechase | Juan Guerra (MEX) | 6:21.2 | Martín Robles (MEX) | 6:26.3 | José López (PUR) | 6:37.2 |
| 110 metres hurdles | Kent Tacklyn (BER) | 14.7 | Juan Montes (PUR) | 15.0 | Fabian Cooper (BAH) | 15.2 |
| 400 metres hurdles | Edwin Cruz (PUR) | 54.6 | Efraín Pedroza (MEX) | 55.2 | Fabian Cooper (BAH) | 56.6 |
| High jump | Henry Lozano (MEX) | 1.90 | Wendell Collie (BAH) | 1.88 | Carlos Renta (PUR) | 1.85 |
| Pole vault | Máximo López (MEX) | 3.25 | Anthony Conyers (BAH) | 3.00 | Doyle Peete (BAH) | 2.80 |
| Long jump | Joey Wells (BAH) | 6.93 | Lyndon Sands (BAH) | 6.91 | Francis Hurtado (VEN) | 6.34 |
| Triple jump | Lyndon Sands (BAH) | 15.09 | Keith Carey (BAH) | 13.85 | José Crespo (PUR) | 13.75 |
| Shot put | Sammy Brennan (BAH) | 15.52 | Steve Coy (TRI) | 15.26 | Martín Gómez (VEN) | 14.60 |
| Discus throw | Martín Gómez (VEN) | 46.21 | Jeff Knowles (BAH) | 43.14 | Crescencio Dromond (AHO) | 40.65 |
| Hammer throw | José Gutiérrez (PUR) | 49.14 | Daniel Marcial (MEX) | 44.46 | Martín Gómez (VEN) | 37.96 |
| Javelin throw | Brooke Onley (BER) | 57.76 | René Velázquez (MEX) | 56.64 | Wendell Collie (BAH) | 54.30 |
| Heptathlon | Brooke Onley (BER) | 4331 | Sammy Brennan (BAH) | 4104 | Joey Wells (BAH) | 3963 |
| 5000 metres track walk | H. Marton (MEX) | 22:48.9 | G. Ignacio (MEX) | 22:50.0 | Phillip McKenzie (BAH) | 27:49.8 |
| 4 × 100 metres relay | Trinidad and Tobago | 42.8 | Puerto Rico | 43.1 | Bahamas | 43.3 |
| 4 × 400 metres relay | Trinidad and Tobago | 3:21.2 | Puerto Rico | 3:23.5 | Venezuela | 3:24.9 |

=== Female Junior B (under 17) ===
| Event | Gold | | Silver | | Bronze | |
|---|---|---|---|---|---|---|
| 100 metres | Candy Ford (BER) | 11.8 | Juliet Cuthbert (JAM) | 12.0 | Margaret Campbell (JAM) | 12.1 |
| 200 metres | Candy Ford (BER) | 24.5 | Terri Julien (ATG) | 24.9 | Maxine McMillan (TRI) | 25.0 |
| 400 metres | Candy Ford (BER) | 55.4 | Yolande Small (TRI) | 56.8 | Jocelyn Joseph (ATG) | 57.0 |
| 800 metres | Roxanne Vincent (TRI) | 2:13.6 | Ramona Rosario (PUR) | 2:14.6 | Rolanda Dill (BER) | 2:17.6 |
| 1200 metres | Ramona Rosario (PUR) | 3:39.0 | Rosa Muñoz (MEX) | 3:41.7 | Roxanne Vincent (TRI) | 3:42.7 |
| 100 metres hurdles | Debbie Greene (BAH) | 14.9 | Mayela Godoy (MEX) | 15.4 | Florence Kelly (BAH) | 16.0 |
| 200 metres hurdles | Debbie Greene (BAH) | 29.6 | Mayela Godoy (MEX) | 31.1 | Suad Ayud (MEX) | 31.4 |
| High jump | Sandra Eastmond (BAR) | 1.62 | Florence Kelly (BAH) | 1.62 | Donna Smith (BAH) | 1.57 |
| Long jump | Ingrid Boyce (BAR) | 5.60 | Debbie Greene (BAH) | 5.59 | Donna Smith (BAH) | 5.33 |
| Shot put | Luz Bohórquez (VEN) | 12.77 | Laverne Eve (BAH) | 12.25 | Jacqueline Kennedy (BER) | 9.50 |
| Discus throw | Laverne Eve (BAH) | 35.16 | Michelle Culmer (BAH) | 27.66 | Damaris Nieves (PUR) | 27.65 |
| Javelin throw | Portia Wallace (BAH) | 37.38 | Barbara Ruíz (MEX) | 36.16 | Michelle Culmer (BAH) | 33.10 |
| Pentathlon | Debbie Greene (BAH) | 3446 | Monique Millar (BAH) | 3145 | Daniela Sáinz (MEX) | 2863 |
| 4 × 100 metres relay | Bahamas | 47.9 | Puerto Rico | 50.1 | Venezuela | 50.6 |
| 4 × 400 metres relay | Bahamas | 3:59.2 | Puerto Rico | 3:59.3 | Venezuela | 4:01.1 |

== Medal table (unofficial) ==
* Host nation (Bahamas)

| Rank | Nation | Gold | Silver | Bronze | Total |
|---|---|---|---|---|---|
| 1 | Mexico (MEX) | 16 | 15 | 12 | 43 |
| 2 | Bahamas (BAH)* | 13 | 21 | 18 | 52 |
| 3 | Puerto Rico (PUR) | 10 | 9 | 14 | 33 |
| 4 | Trinidad and Tobago (TTO) | 8 | 5 | 6 | 19 |
| 5 | Bermuda (BER) | 8 | 0 | 4 | 12 |
| 6 | Venezuela (VEN) | 4 | 12 | 10 | 26 |
| 7 | Antigua and Barbuda (ATG) | 4 | 1 | 2 | 7 |
| 8 | Jamaica (JAM) | 3 | 8 | 2 | 13 |
| 9 | Guyana (GUY) | 3 | 2 | 0 | 5 |
| 10 | Barbados (BAR) | 2 | 0 | 1 | 3 |
| 11 | Dominican Republic (DOM) | 1 | 0 | 0 | 1 |
| 11 | Panama (PAN) | 1 | 0 | 0 | 1 |
| 13 | Guatemala (GUA) | 0 | 0 | 2 | 2 |
| 14 | Costa Rica (CRC) | 0 | 0 | 1 | 1 |
| 14 | Netherlands Antilles (AHO) | 0 | 0 | 1 | 1 |
| Totals (15 entries) | | 73 | 73 | 73 | 219 |

== Participation (unofficial) ==
A couple of smaller nations gave their debut at the championships, i.e. Antigua and Barbuda (to become independent by the end of that year), Bermuda, Guyana, and the Netherlands Antilles. Detailed result lists can be found on the World Junior Athletics History website. There is no information on athletes competing in the relay teams. An unofficial count yields the number of about 263 athletes (150 junior (under-20) and 113 youth (under-17)) from about 15 countries, resulting in a new record number of participating nations:

- Antigua and Barbuda (6)
- Bahamas (58)
- Barbados (3)
- Bermuda (15)
- Costa Rica (4)
- Dominican Republic (1)
- Guatemala (9)
- Guyana (2)
- Jamaica (14)
- (Mexico) México (52)
- Netherlands Antilles (4)
- (Panama) Panamá (2)
- Puerto Rico (46)
- Trinidad and Tobago (14)
- Venezuela (33)
