= 1982 Central American and Caribbean Junior Championships in Athletics =

V Central American and Caribbean Junior Championships
- Dates: 23–25 July
- Host city: Bridgetown, Barbados
- Level: Junior and Youth
- Events: 75 (39 junior, 36 youth)
- Participation: about 320 (186 junior, 134 youth) athletes from 18 nations

The 5th Central American and Caribbean Junior Championships was held in Bridgetown, Barbados, on 23–25 July 1982.

== Medal summary ==
Medal winners are published by category: Junior A, Male, Junior A, Female, and Junior B. Complete results can be found on the World Junior Athletics History website.

=== Male Junior A (under 20) ===
Event	Gold		Silver		Bronze	
100 metres	Earle Laing (JAM)	10.51	Ruthven Prithwie (TRI)	10.53	Lester Benjamin (ATG)	10.60
200 metres	Ruthven Prithwie (TRI)	21.20	Joey Wells (BAH)	21.29	Víctor Carrasquel (VEN)	21.52
400 metres	Damian Mendoza (TRI)	47.50	Richard Louis (BAR)	47.61	Joseph Boyd (JAM)	47.99
800 metres	Damian Mendoza (TRI)	1:56.58	Michael Lawson (JAM)	1:56.60	Richard Taylor (JAM)	1:56.82
1500 metres	Mario Rondón (VEN)	3:55.78	Mauricio Cadavid (COL)	3:55.81	Vidal de la Loza (MEX)	3:56.00
5000 metres	Mauricio Cadavid (COL)	14:43.35	Roberto López (MEX)	14:45.70	Rubén Rivera (PUR)	14:52.06
10,000 metres	Rubén Rivera (PUR)	32:22.54	Miguel Rosa (PUR)	32:54.80	Roberto López (MEX)	33:44.75
Half Marathon	Miguel Rosa (PUR)	1:12:28	Gregorio Arrechi (VEN)	1:17:20	Alfredo Castro (PUR)	1:22:24
3000 metres steeplechase	Félix Almaguer (CUB)	9:18.88	José Frausto (MEX)	9:31.85	Alfredo Castro (PUR)	9:35.00
110 metres hurdles	Ángel Bueno (CUB)	14.62	Gerald Martin (JAM)	14.84	Douglas Rosado (PUR)	14.87
400 metres hurdles	Orville Gayle (JAM)	56.02	William Meadows (PUR)	57.12	Efraín Pedroza (MEX)	59.00
High jump	Philippe Dogué (MTQ)	2.03	Nick Saunders (BER)	1.98	Adrian Johnson (BAR)	1.98
Pole vault	Wendell Collie (BAH)	3.43	Evan Wisdom (BAH)	3.43	Carlos González (PUR)	3.35
Long jump	Joey Wells (BAH)	7.60	Lester Benjamin (ATG)	7.53	Adrian Jordan (BAR)	7.19
Triple jump	Lester Benjamin (ATG)	15.83	Lázaro Balcindes (CUB)	15.67	Deryck Lorde (BAR)	15.01
Shot put	Harry Rodríguez (PUR)	13.75	Steve Coy (TRI)	13.54	Sammy Brennan (BAH)	13.53
Discus throw	Cruz Ramos (VEN)	42.34	Steve Coy (TRI)	41.20	Wesley Francis (TRI)	40.16
Hammer throw	Francisco Soria (CUB)	59.56	José Gutiérrez (PUR)	44.74	Joel Martínez (VEN)	43.36
Javelin throw	Philippe Dogué (MTQ)	58.12	Brooke Onley (BER)	58.06	Cosme Hurtado (VEN)	57.38
Decathlon	Wendell Collie (BAH)	6449	Brooke Onley (BER)	6388	Sammy Brennan (BAH)	6279
10,000 metres track walk	Héctor Moreno (COL)	44:13.55	Marcos Hernández (COL)	46:19.64	Santos Hernández (PUR)	49:47.01
4 × 100 metres relay	Jamaica; Ray Stewart; Gerald Martin; Leroy Reid; Earle Laing	40.68	Trinidad and Tobago; R. Parris; Anthony Monroe; Ruthven Prithwie; Derrick George	40.92	Venezuela; O. Gil; Victor Carrasquel; Freddy Pérez; Antonio Gómez	41.44
4 × 400 metres relay	Jamaica; Michael Lawson; Mark Senior; Fenton Hugg; Joseph Boyd	3:14.08	Trinidad and Tobago; Avion Callender; I. Haynes; Damien Mendoza; Ruthven Prithwie	3:16.99	Barbados; T. Wiltshire; Camelia Hinds; Victor Jordan; Richard Louis	3:17.32

=== Female Junior A (under 20) ===
Event	Gold		Silver		Bronze	
100 metres	Eldece Clarke (BAH)	11.80	Maxine McMillan (TRI)	11.86	Veronica Findlay (JAM)	12.08
200 metres	Angela Williams (TRI)	23.86	Maxine McMillan (TRI)	23.98	Eldece Clarke (BAH)	24.20
400 metres	Cathy Rattray (JAM)	54.53	Yolande Small (TRI)	55.26	Carlon Blackman (BAR)	55.73
800 metres	Sharon Charles (GRN)	2:16.07	Ramona Rosario (PUR)	2:16.82	Whelma Colebrooke (BAH)	2:17.03
1500 metres	Bigna Samuel (VIN)	4:43.25	Adriana Frausto (MEX)	4:44.74	Rosa Domínguez (MEX)	4:45.00
3000 metres	Genoveva Domínguez (MEX)	10:06.57	Fabiola Rueda (COL)	10:08.00	María Pérez (CUB)	10:35.27
100 metres hurdles	Debbie Greene (BAH)	15.30	Belkis Chávez (CUB)	15.40	Andrene Anderson (JAM)	15.50
400 metres hurdles	Evelyn Mathieu (PUR)	65.98	Monique Millar (BAH)	68.99	Maribel Verdijo (PUR)	69.99
High jump	Sandra Eastmond (BAR)	1.69	Janelle Kelly (TRI)	1.67	Jennifer Archer (BAR)	1.67
Long jump	Ingrid Boyce (BAR)	5.88	Sorelis Bohórquez (VEN)	5.85	Eloísa Ankles (CUB)	5.76
Shot put	Luz Bohórquez (VEN)	14.14	Maritza Martén (CUB)	14.10	Laverne Eve (BAH)	13.26
Discus throw	Yunaira Piña (VEN)	45.94	Marie-Claire Hilaire (MTQ)	44.60	Nora Martín (MEX)	39.50
Javelin throw	Iris de Grasse (CUB)	53.80	Marieta Riera (VEN)	49.55	Yunaira Piña (VEN)	47.38
Heptathlon	Monique Millar (BAH)	4596	Jan Antoine (BAH)	4156	Carmen Nieves (PUR)	3570
4 × 100 metres relay	Trinidad and Tobago; Dina Kingland; Maxine McMillan; Jenelle Kelly; Angela Williams	46.63	Bahamas; Jan Antoine; Whelma Colebrooke; Debbie Greene; Eldece Clarke	47.13	Jamaica; Sharon Barnes; Andrene Anderson; Veronica Findlay; Cathy Rattray	47.56
4 × 400 metres relay	Trinidad and Tobago; Hilary Bernard; Dawn Douglas; Maxine McMillan; Yolande Small	3:43.96	Jamaica; Yvonne Shields; V. Maxwell; Sharon Powell; Cathy Rattray	3:51.24	Puerto Rico; Carmen Nieves; Maribel Verdejo; Evelyn Mathieu; Ramona Rosario	3:54.03

=== Male Junior B (under 17) ===
Event	Gold		Silver		Bronze	
100 metres	Michael Newbold (BAH)	11.00	Shane Howell (JAM)	11.31	Mark Johnson (BAH)	11.35
200 metres	Michael Newbold (BAH)	22.03	Mark Johnson (BAH)	22.46	Ibrahim Rivera (PUR)	22.69
400 metres	Nicholas Tracey (JAM)	50.65	Rómulo Pantajo (VEN)	51.05	Michael Warren (JAM)	51.10
800 metres	José Gautier (PUR)	2:02.31	Sebastian Warner (VIN)	2:03.36	Deryck Codrington (BAR)	2:04.43
1500 metres	José Gautier (PUR)	4:10.70	Francisco Sánchez (VEN)	4:12.48	Deryck Codrington (BAR)	4:14.60
3000 metres	Luis Cruz (PUR)	9:08.71	Francisco Sánchez (VEN)	9:24.67	Reinaldo Félix (PUR)	9:35.73
2000 metres steeplechase	Reinaldo Félix (PUR)	6:29.90	Miguel Mercado (PUR)	6:35.17	Daniel Flores (MEX)	6:45.85
110 metres hurdles	Allan Arroyo (PUR)	15.50	Greg Williams (JAM)	15.59	Allan Ince (BAR)	16.37
400 metres hurdles	Alexander Doville (VEN)	56.33	Allan Arroyo (PUR)	59.26	David Ince (BAR)	59.37
High jump	Robert Douglas (JAM)	1.92	Troy Kemp (BAH)	1.82	Eduardo Monroig (PUR)	1.77
Pole vault	Ángel Mudafort (PUR)	3.20	Gian Piubil (PUR)	2.74	Troy Kemp (BAH)	2.64
Long jump	Michael Newbold (BAH)	6.95	Greg Williams (JAM)	6.80	Arnaldo Cruz (PUR)	6.80
Triple jump	Arnaldo Cruz (PUR)	13.75	Carlos Moreno (PUR)	13.69	Godfrey Augustine (GRN)	13.67
Shot put	Alberto Farías (VEN)	14.63	Joseph Antoine (TRI)	14.52	Romero Africana (VEN)	14.46
Discus throw	Joe Woodside (BAH)	49.74	Oswald Banamu (VEN)	42.26	Iván Romero (VEN)	40.10
Hammer throw	Iván Romero (VEN)	41.64	Joe Woodside (BAH)	29.60	Mark Gibson (BAH)	22.42
Javelin throw	Joseph Antoine (TRI)	58.34	Roberto Espinoso (VEN)	56.34	Godfrey Augustine (GRN)	51.26
Heptathlon	Alfredo Mayén (MEX)	3840	Frank Griffith (BAR)	3340	Mark Gibson (BAH)	2809
5000 metres track walk	Carlos Mercenario (MEX)	22:52.46	Martín Hinojosa (MEX)	22:54.47	Henry Goitía (VEN)	???
4 × 100 metres relay	Jamaica; Brown; Greg Williams; Hugh Fyffe; Shane Howell	43.45	Barbados; Terry Belle; Brian Benn; James Browne; Gregston Wharton	44.60	Venezuela; García; Nelson Corvis; Louis Blanco; Pomeo	44.97
4 × 400 metres relay	Jamaica; Michael Warren; Hugh Fyffe; Nicholas Tracey; Shane Howell	3:24.25	Puerto Rico; Javier Andrade; Allan Arroyo; Ibrahim Rivera; José Gautier	3:25.14	Barbados; Terry Bryan; David Ince; David Holder; James Browne	3:33.78

=== Female Junior B (under 17) ===
Event	Gold		Silver		Bronze	
100 metres	Pauline Davis (BAH)	11.89	Gillian Forde (TRI)	12.14	Yolande Straughn (BAR)	12.23
200 metres	Pauline Davis (BAH)	23.90	Gillian Forde (TRI)	24.65	Yolande Straughn (BAR)	24.96
400 metres	Pauline Davis (BAH)	55.90	Florencia Chilberry (VEN)	57.13	Guadalupe García (MEX)	57.40
800 metres	Bernardette John (TRI)	2:17.52	Andrea Thomas (JAM)	2:18.59	Diana García (PUR)	2:19.12
1200 metres	Rosa Muñoz (MEX)	3:44.15	Martha Olvera (MEX)	3:44.6	Diana García (PUR)	3:51.19
100 metres hurdles	Verna Hibbert (JAM)	15.72	Kay McConney (BAR)	15.75	Xiomara Hernández (VEN)	17.16
300 metres hurdles	Clara Rosa (PUR)	47.99	Kay McConney (BAR)	48.16	Eudolis Subero (VEN)	48.90
High jump	Mazel Thomas (JAM)	1.59	Cristina Cistero (MEX)	1.56	Betty Licorish (GRN)	1.53
Long jump	Pauline Davis (BAH)	5.22	Mazel Thomas (JAM)	5.15	Catherine Richards (BAR)	5.14
Shot put	Beryl Clarkson (GRN)	10.90	Rennet Celestine (TRI)	10.25	Mayra Ortega (PUR)	9.73
Discus throw	Jenny Quintero (VEN)	36.66	Nolette Boelijn (AHO)	27.88	Juliette Griffith (BAR)	24.82
Javelin throw	Mayra Ortega (PUR)	39.90	Mora Milagros (VEN)	37.52	Rennet Celestine (TRI)	36.24
Pentathlon	Tibisay Moreno (VEN)	2512	Celeste Batson (BAR)	2445	Heather Lynch (BAR)	2276
4 × 100 metres relay	Trinidad and Tobago; Joane Solomon; Hospedales; Nicole Charles; Gillian Forde	49.66	Barbados; Forde; Franklyn; Watson; Yolande Straughn	49.83	Puerto Rico; Figueroa; Burgos; Rivera; Clemente	50.35
4 × 400 metres relay	Trinidad and Tobago; Nicole Charles; Joane Solomon; Gillian Forde; Bernardette John	3:56.08	Mexico; Guadalupe García; Rosa Muñoz; Marta Olivera; Adriana Somolano	3:57.01	Puerto Rico; Rivera; Clemente; Burgos; Diana García	4:04.15

== Medal table (unofficial) ==
* Host nation (Barbados)

Rank	Nation	Gold	Silver	Bronze	Total
1	Bahamas (BAH)	14	8	9	31
2	Puerto Rico (PUR)	13	9	18	40
3	Jamaica (JAM)	11	8	6	25
4	Trinidad and Tobago (TTO)	10	13	2	25
5	Venezuela (VEN)	9	10	11	30
6	Mexico (MEX)	4	7	7	18
7	Cuba (CUB)	4	3	2	9
8	Barbados (BAR)*	2	7	16	25
9	Colombia (COL)	2	3	0	5
10	Martinique (MTQ)	2	1	0	3
11	Grenada (GRN)	2	0	3	5
12	Antigua and Barbuda (ATG)	1	1	1	3
13	Saint Vincent and the Grenadines (VIN)	1	1	0	2
14	Bermuda (BER)	0	3	0	3
15	Netherlands Antilles (AHO)	0	1	0	1
Totals (15 entries)		75	75	75	225

== Participation (unofficial) ==
The British Virgin Islands, Colombia, Grenada, Martinique, and Saint Vincent and the Grenadines competed for the first time at the championships. Detailed result lists can be found on the World Junior Athletics History website. An unofficial count yields the number of about 320 athletes (186 junior (under-20) and 134 youth (under-17)) from about 18 countries, again a new record number of participating nations:

- Antigua and Barbuda (3)
- Bahamas (19)
- Barbados (61)
- Bermuda (4)
- British Virgin Islands (1)
- Colombia (5)
- Cuba (16)
- Dominican Republic (1)
- Grenada (8)
- Guyana (1)
- Jamaica (34)
- Martinique (2)
- (Mexico) México(25)
- Netherlands Antilles (7)
- Puerto Rico (56)
- Saint Vincent and the Grenadines (4)
- Trinidad and Tobago (26)
- Venezuela (47)
