= Athletics at the 1983 Pan American Games – Men's long jump =

Men's long jump at the Pan American Games

The men's long jump event at the 1983 Pan American Games was held in Caracas, Venezuela on 24 August.

== Results ==
Rank	Name	Nationality	Result	Notes
1st place, gold medalist(s)	Jaime Jefferson	Cuba	8.03	
2nd place, silver medalist(s)	Vesco Bradley	United States	7.99	
3rd place, bronze medalist(s)	Juan Felipe Ortiz	Cuba	7.91	
4	Lester Benjamin	Antigua and Barbuda	7.89	
5	Steve Hanna	Bahamas	7.66	
6	Wilfredo Almonte	Dominican Republic	7.61	
7	Oswaldo Torres	Venezuela	7.29	
8	Franco Francis	Venezuela	7.23	
9	Fidel Solórzano	Ecuador	6.66	
	Randy Williams	United States	DNS	
	Calvin Greenaway	Antigua and Barbuda	DNS	
