= Athletics at the 1982 Central American and Caribbean Games =

Athletics at the XIV CAC Games
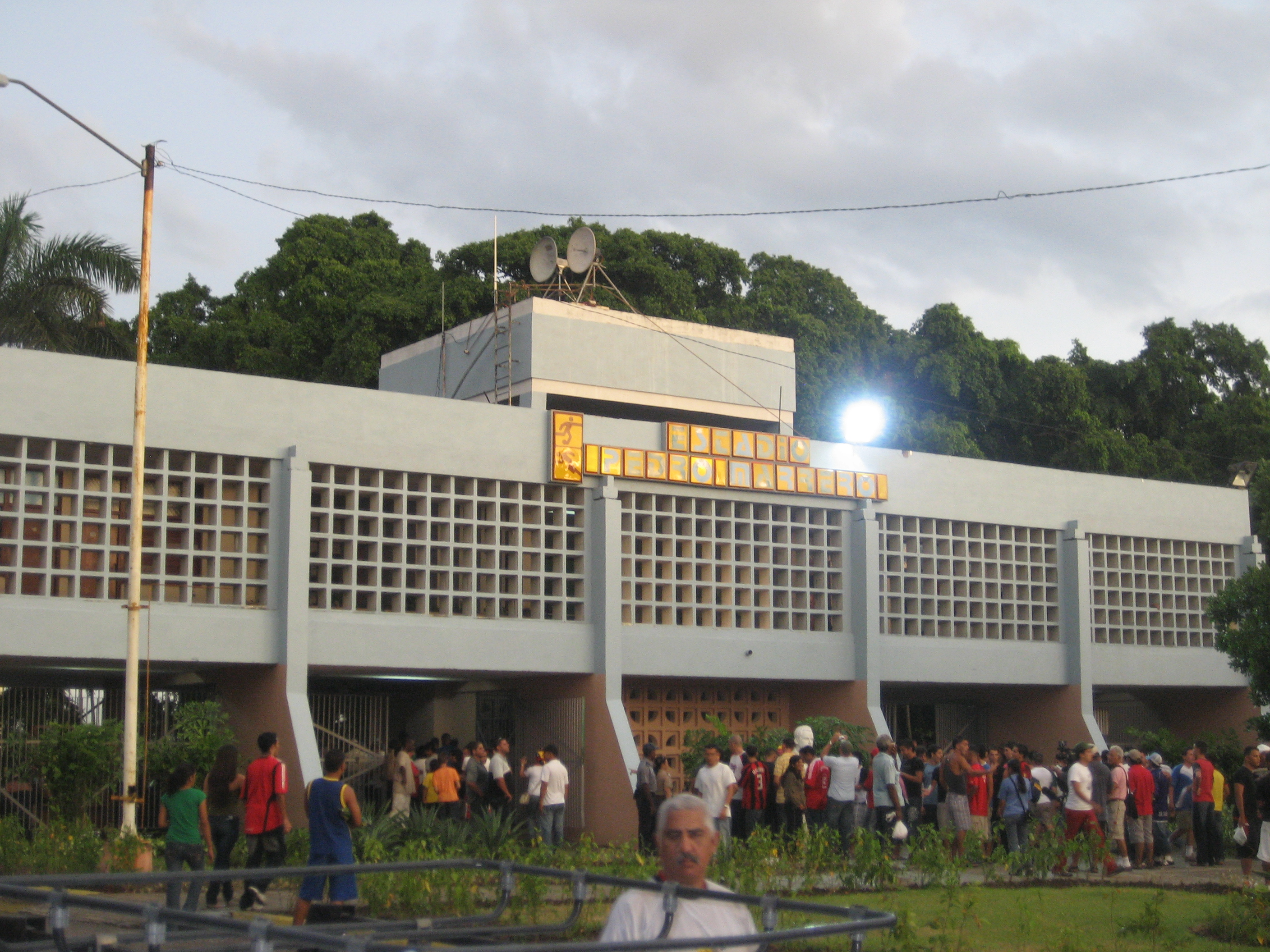
- Host stadium
- Dates: 8–12 August 1982
- Host city: Havana, Cuba
- Venue: Estadio Pedro Marrero
- Events: 40
- Records set: 20 GR

The athletics competition in the 1982 Central American and Caribbean Games were held at the Estadio Pedro Marrero in Havana, Cuba.

It was the first time that men's 50 kilometres walk, women's 3000 metres, 400 metres hurdles and heptathlon (replacing pentathlon) events were held at the Games.

== Medal summary ==
=== Men's events ===
| Event | Gold | | Silver | | Bronze | |
|---|---|---|---|---|---|---|
| 100 metres (wind: -2.4 m/s) | Leandro Peñalver; Cuba | 10.16 | Osvaldo Lara; Cuba | 10.26 | Juan Núñez; Dominican Republic | 10.33 |
| 200 metres (wind: +0.6 m/s) | Leandro Peñalver; Cuba | 20.42 GR | Osvaldo Lara; Cuba | 20.94 | Juan Núñez; Dominican Republic | 21.04 |
| 400 metres | Bert Cameron; Jamaica | 45.10 | Agustín Pavó; Cuba | 45.87 | Carlos Reyté; Cuba | 46.34 |
| 800 metres | Alberto Juantorena; Cuba | 1:45.15 GR | William Wuycke; Venezuela | 1:45.75 | Bárbaro Serrano; Cuba | 1:46.66 |
| 1500 metres | Eduardo Castro; Mexico | 3:41.84 GR | Luis Medina; Cuba | 3:41.92 | Ignacio Melesio; Mexico | 3:42.03 |
| 5000 metres | Eduardo Castro; Mexico | 14:11.05 | Luis Medina; Cuba | 14:24.81 | Lucirio Garrido; Venezuela | 14:24.94 |
| 10,000 metres | Aldo Allen; Cuba | 30:13.12 | Enrique Aquino; Mexico | 30:15.35 | José Alcalá; Mexico | 30:28.04 |
| Marathon | Jorge González; Puerto Rico | 02:26:40 | Radamés González; Cuba | 02:28:12 | Miguel Cruz; Mexico | 02:30:37 |
| 110 metres hurdles (wind: -0.2 m/s) | Alejandro Casañas; Cuba | 13.38 GR | Juan Saborit; Cuba | 13.91 | Modesto Castillo; Dominican Republic | 13.95 |
| 400 metres hurdles | Frank Montiéh; Cuba | 50.64 | Jorge Batista; Cuba | 50.98 | Greg Rolle; Bahamas | 51.18 |
| 3000 metre steeplechase | José Cobo; Cuba | 8:49.52 | Lucirio Garrido; Venezuela | 8:52.50 | Pedro Guibert; Cuba | 8:58.08 |
| 4 × 100 metres relay | Cuba; Osvaldo Lara; Alejandro Casañas; Leandro Peñalver; Juan Saborit | 39.15 | Jamaica; Joseph Boyd; Earle Laing; Leroy Reid; Floyd Brown | 39.94 | Dominican Republic; Juan Contreras; Wilfredo Almonte; Juan Núñez; Gerardo Suero | 40.11 |
| 4 × 400 metres relay | Cuba; Agustín Pavó; Carlos Reyté; Roberto Ramos; Alberto Juantorena | 3:03.59 GR | Jamaica; Floyd Brown; Mark Senior; Bert Cameron; Karl Smith | 3:04.78 | Trinidad and Tobago; Michael Puckerin; Joseph Coombs; Ali St. Louis; Andrew Bruce | 3:08.20 |
| 20 kilometre road walk | Ernesto Canto; Mexico | 1:29:22 | Raúl González; Mexico | 1:31:27 | Alfredo Garrido; Cuba | 1:39:00 |
| 50 kilometre road walk | Félix Gómez; Mexico | 4:05:03 GR | Raúl González; Mexico | 4:10:34 | David Castro; Cuba | 4:43:53 |
| High jump | Francisco Centelles; Cuba | 2.25 GR | Steve Wray; Bahamas | 2.17 | Clarence Saunders; Bermuda | 2.17 |
| Pole vault | Rubén Camino; Cuba | 5.00 =GR | José Echevarría; Cuba | 5.00 =GR | Miguel Escoto; Mexico | 4.90 |
| Long jump | Delroy Poyser; Jamaica | 7.90 GR | Wilfredo Almonte; Dominican Republic | 7.82 | Steve Hanna; Bahamas | 7.80 |
| Triple jump | Steve Hanna; Bahamas | 16.73 | Lázaro Betancourt; Cuba | 16.64 | Jorge Reyna; Cuba | 16.61 |
| Shot put | Luis Delís; Cuba | 18.88 GR | Radai Mendoza; Puerto Rico | 16.21 | Paul Ruiz; Cuba | 16.14 |
| Discus throw | Luis Delís; Cuba | 70.20 GR | Brad Cooper; Bahamas | 66.72 | Juan Martínez; Cuba | 62.82 |
| Hammer throw | Genovevo Morejón; Cuba | 67.10 | Alfredo Luis; Cuba | 66.14 | Andrés Polemil; Dominican Republic | 56.14 |
| Javelin throw | Dionisio Quintana; Cuba | 82.40 GR | Amado Morales; Puerto Rico | 79.36 | Antonio González; Cuba | 74.86 |
| Decathlon | Liston Bochette; Puerto Rico | 7349 | Guillermo Sánchez; Mexico | 7345 | Carlos Palacios; Cuba | 7236 |

=== Women's events ===
| Event | Gold | | Silver | | Bronze | |
|---|---|---|---|---|---|---|
| 100 metres (wind: -1.9 m/s) | Luisa Ferrer; Cuba | 11.55 | Janice Bernard; Trinidad and Tobago | 11.57 | Marie Lande Mathieu; Puerto Rico | 11.63 |
| 200 metres (wind: +1.2 m/s) | Luisa Ferrer; Cuba | 23.44 | Angela Williams; Trinidad and Tobago | 23.75 | Marie Lande Mathieu; Puerto Rico | 23.83 |
| 400 metres | June Griffith; Guyana | 51.89 | Mercedes Álvarez; Cuba | 52.32 | Cathy Rattray; Jamaica | 52.39 |
| 800 metres | Nery McKeen; Cuba | 2:04.22 | Angelita Lind; Puerto Rico | 2:04.24 | María Ribeaux; Cuba | 2:04.47 |
| 1500 metres | Angelita Lind; Puerto Rico | 4:25.94 | Sergia Martínez; Cuba | 4:26.69 | Alicia Diffourt; Cuba | 4:27.96 |
| 3000 metres | Sergia Martínez; Cuba | 9:37.32 GR | Marisela Rivero; Venezuela | 9:38.40 | María Cuesta; Cuba | 9:41.66 |
| 100 metres hurdles (wind: -1.9 m/s) | Grisel Machado; Cuba | 13.18 GR | Marisela Peralta; Dominican Republic | 14.07 | June Caddle; Barbados | 14.08 |
| 400 metres hurdles | Sandra Farmer; Jamaica | 58.15 GR | Mercedes Mesa; Cuba | 58.65 | Stephanie Vega; Puerto Rico | 59.11 |
| 4 × 100 metres relay | Trinidad and Tobago; Gillian Forde; Maxime McMillan; Angela Williams; Janice Bernard | 44.86 | Jamaica; Verónica Findlay; Cathy Rattray; Anthea Johnson; Jacqueline Pusey | 45.77 | Cuba; Luisa Ferrer; Idania Pino; Ester Petitón; Grisel Machado | 45.85 |
| 4 × 400 metres relay | Cuba; Mercedes Alvarez; Ana Fidelia Quirot; Mercedes Mesa; Nery McKeen | 3:35.22 | Puerto Rico; Nilsa París; Stephanie Vega; Margaret de Jesús; Marie Lande Mathieu | 3:36.52 | Jamaica; Jacqueline Pusey; Cathy Rattray; Sandra Farmer; Anthea Johnson | 3:37.86 |
| High jump | Silvia Costa; Cuba | 1.90 GR | Angela Carbonell; Cuba | 1.81 | Iraima Parra; Venezuela | 1.78 |
| Long jump | Eloína Echevarría; Cuba | 6.53 GR | Shonel Ferguson; Bahamas | 6.47 | Madeline de Jesús; Puerto Rico | 6.47 |
| Shot put | María Elena Sarría; Cuba | 19.36 GR | Rosa Fernández; Cuba | 17.54 | Luz Bohórquez; Venezuela | 13.63 |
| Discus throw | María Cristina Betancourt; Cuba | 63.76 GR | Carmen Romero; Cuba | 61.98 | Yunaira Piña; Venezuela | 46.86 |
| Javelin throw | María Caridad Colón; Cuba | 62.80 | Mayra Vila; Cuba | 60.22 | Marieta Riera; Venezuela | 51.50 |
| Heptathlon | Elida Aveillé; Cuba | 5579 GR | Victoria Despaigne; Cuba | 5210 | Leyda Castro; Dominican Republic | 5123 |

== Medal table ==
| Rank | Nation | Gold | Silver | Bronze | Total |
|---|---|---|---|---|---|
| 1 | Cuba (CUB) | 27 | 19 | 14 | 60 |
| 2 | Mexico (MEX) | 4 | 4 | 4 | 12 |
| 3 | Puerto Rico (PUR) | 3 | 4 | 4 | 11 |
| 4 | Jamaica (JAM) | 3 | 3 | 2 | 8 |
| 5 | Bahamas (BAH) | 1 | 3 | 2 | 6 |
| 6 | Trinidad and Tobago (TTO) | 1 | 2 | 1 | 4 |
| 7 | Guyana (GUY) | 1 | 0 | 0 | 1 |
| 8 | Venezuela (VEN) | 0 | 3 | 5 | 8 |
| 9 | Dominican Republic (DOM) | 0 | 2 | 6 | 8 |
| 10 | Barbados (BAR) | 0 | 0 | 1 | 1 |
| 10 | Bermuda (BER) | 0 | 0 | 1 | 1 |
| Totals (11 entries) | | 40 | 40 | 40 | 120 |

== See also ==
- 1982 in athletics (track and field)
