= Delroy Poyser =

Jamaican long jumper (1962–2019)

Personal information
- Born: 5 January 1962 Kingston, Jamaica
- Died: 11 February 2019 (aged 57) Lubbock, Texas, U.S.
- Occupation: Credit loan officer

Sport
- Sport: Long jump
Medal record
Men's athletics
Representing Jamaica
Central American and Caribbean Games
Gold medal – first place	1982 Havana	Long jump
CAC Junior Championships (U20)
Silver medal – second place	1980 Nassau	High jump
CARIFTA Games Junior (U20)
Gold medal – first place	1980 Hamilton	High Jump
CAC Junior Championships (U17)
Bronze medal – third place	1978 Xalapa	High jump

Delroy Poyser (5 January 1962 – 11 February 2019) was a Jamaican long jumper, who won the gold medal for his native country at the 1982 Central American and Caribbean Games in Havana, Cuba.

Poyser competed for the Texas Tech Red Raiders track and field team in the NCAA.

He died on 11 February 2019, aged 57 after a long battle with cancer.

== Achievements ==
Year	Competition	Venue	Position	Event	Notes
Representing Jamaica
1978	Central American and Caribbean Junior Championships (U-17)	Xalapa, Mexico	3rd	High jump	1.85 m A
1980	CARIFTA Games (U-20)	Hamilton, Bermuda	1st	High jump	2.08 m
1980	CARIFTA Games (U-20)	Hamilton, Bermuda	5th	Long jump	6.90 m
1980	Central American and Caribbean Junior Championships (U-20)	Nassau, Bahamas	2nd	High jump	2.06 m
1981	CARIFTA Games (U-20)	Nassau, Bahamas	4th	High jump	2.06 m
1982	Central American and Caribbean Games	Havana, Cuba	1st	Long jump	7.90 m
1982	Commonwealth Games	Brisbane, Australia	7th	Long jump	7.24 m
