= Orde Ballantyne =

Vincentian athlete

Personal information
- Born: 22 January 1962 (age 64)

Sport
- Country: Saint Vincent and the Grenadines
- Sport: Athletics
Medal record
Men's athletics
Representing Saint Vincent and the Grenadines
CARIFTA Games Junior (U20)
Gold medal – first place	1981 Nassau	shot put

Orde Ballantyne (born 22 January 1962) is a Vincentian athlete, who competed at the 1988 Summer Olympics.

== Career ==
Ballantyne became the first Vincentian to win a gold medal at the CARIFTA Games when competing in the shot put at the 1981 CARIFTA Games held in Nassau, the Bahamas. Six years later Ballantyne competed at the first ever IAAF World Indoor Championships in Athletics held in Indianapolis, United States, he entered the 60 metres and finished fourth in his heat in a time off 7.05 seconds which was a new national record, but still wasn't fast enough to qualify for the next round, he also entered the long jump but didn't make any legitimate jumps so didn't receive an official ranking.

Ballantyne was also part of the first ever Saint Vincent and the Grenadines team to compete at the Summer Olympics in 1988 when they went to Seoul, South Korea, he entered the long jump, but again he failed to register a distance from his three jumps so he didn't advance any further.
