= Richard Louis =

Barbadian sprinter (1964–2025)

Medal record

Men's athletics

Representing Barbados

CAC Junior Championships (U20)
Silver medal – second place	1982 Bridgetown	400 m
Bronze medal – third place	1982 Bridgetown	4x400 m relay

CAC Junior Championships (U17)
Bronze medal – third place	1980 Nassau	400 m

CARIFTA Games Junior (U20)
Gold medal – first place	1981 Nassau	400m
Silver medal – second place	1983 Fort-de-France	400m

CARIFTA Games Youth (U17)
Gold medal – first place	1980 Hamilton	200m
Gold medal – first place	1980 Hamilton	400m
Silver medal – second place	1980 Hamilton	100m
Bronze medal – third place	1979 Kingston	400m

Richard Louis (6 January 1964 – 3 January 2025) was a Barbadian sprinter who specialised in the 400 metres.

== Biography ==
Louis was awarded the Austin Sealy Trophy for the most outstanding athlete of the 1980 CARIFTA Games winning 2 gold (200m, 400m) and 1 silver (100m) medals in the youth (U-17) category.

Louis competed for the Howard Bison track and field team in the NCAA.

He won the silver medal at the Central American and Caribbean Junior Championships in 1982.

At the 1984 Olympic Games he finished sixth in the 4 x 400 metres relay, together with teammates David Peltier, Clyde Edwards, and Elvis Forde. Their time of 3:01.60 minutes is still the Barbadian record.

Louis also competed in the individual distance at the 1984 Olympics, and both in relay and individually at the 1988 Olympic Games.

Louis died in Florida, United States on 3 January 2025, at the age of 60.

== Achievements ==
Year	Competition	Venue	Position	Event	Notes
Representing Barbados
1979	CARIFTA Games (U-17)	Kingston, Jamaica	8th	100 m	11.64
1979	CARIFTA Games (U-17)	Kingston, Jamaica	4th	200 m	22.83
1979	CARIFTA Games (U-17)	Kingston, Jamaica	3rd	400 m	51.25
1980	CARIFTA Games (U-17)	Hamilton, Bermuda	2nd	100 m	11.04
1980	CARIFTA Games (U-17)	Hamilton, Bermuda	1st	200 m	22.30
1980	CARIFTA Games (U-17)	Hamilton, Bermuda	1st	400 m	49.51
1980	Central American and Caribbean Junior Championships (U-17)	Nassau, Bahamas	4th	200 m	22.6
1980	Central American and Caribbean Junior Championships (U-17)	Nassau, Bahamas	3rd	400 m	49.7
1981	CARIFTA Games (U-20)	Nassau, Bahamas	4th	200 m	21.56
1981	CARIFTA Games (U-20)	Nassau, Bahamas	1st	400 m	46.62
1982	Central American and Caribbean Junior Championships (U-20)	Bridgetown, Barbados	2nd	400 m	47.61
1982	Central American and Caribbean Junior Championships (U-20)	Bridgetown, Barbados	3rd	4 × 400 m relay	3:17.32
1983	CARIFTA Games (U-20)	Fort-de-France, Martinique	2nd	400 m	47.73
1984	Olympic Games	Los Angeles, United States	4th (h)	400 m	46.70
1984	Olympic Games	Los Angeles, United States	6th	4 × 400 m relay	3.01.60 NR
1988	Olympic Games	Seoul, South Korea	4th (h)	400 m	46.80
1988	Olympic Games	Seoul, South Korea	5th (sf)	4 × 400 m relay	3:06.93
