= Raymonde Naigre =

French sprinter

Medal record

Women's athletics

Representing Guadeloupe

CARIFTA Games Junior (U20)
Gold medal – first place	1979 Kingston	100m
Silver medal – second place	1978 Nassau	100m
Silver medal – second place	1978 Nassau	200m
Bronze medal – third place	1977 Bridgetown	200m
Bronze medal – third place	1979 Kingston	200m

Raymonde Naigre (born 23 January 1960 in Les Abymes, Guadeloupe) is a French athlete who specialises in the 200 meters and the 100 meter relay. Naigre competed at the 1980 Summer Olympics and 1984 Summer Olympics.

== Biography ==
She became French Athletics Championships in the 400 meters in 1983 and 1984 and also won the indoor title in 1985. She broke the French record for the 4 × 100 m relay four times, bringing it to 42.84 seconds in the final of the 1980 Olympic Games in Moscow, where the French team finished fifth in the final.

Raymonde Naigre won the 400 m event at the 1983 Mediterranean Games in Casablanca with a time of 52.78 seconds. At the 1984 Olympic Games in Los Angeles, she finished fourth in the 4 × 100 m relay, alongside Rose-Aimée Bacoul, Liliane Gaschet, and Marie-France Loval, missing out on the bronze medal by just 4/100ths of a second.

== Bibliography ==
- sports reference
