= Jesús Herrera =

Mexican long-distance runner

Personal information
- Born: March 22, 1962 (age 64)

Sport
- Sport: Long distance running
Medal record
Representing Mexico
CAC Junior Championships (U20)
Gold medal – first place	1980 Nassau	3000 m steeplechase
Silver medal – second place	1980 Nassau	5000 m
CAC Junior Championships (U17)
Gold medal – first place	1978 Xalapa	3000 m
Bronze medal – third place	1978 Xalapa	1000 m
Summer Universiade
Silver medal – second place	1985 Kobe	10,000m

Jesús Herrera (born March 22, 1962) is a Mexican retired long-distance runner.

== Career ==
He represented his native country at two consecutive Summer Olympics, starting in 1984. His best Olympic result was finishing in 11th place in the men's marathon, clocking 2:13:58, at the 1988 Summer Olympics in Seoul, South Korea.

== Achievements ==
Year	Competition	Venue	Position	Event	Notes
Representing Mexico
1978	Central American and Caribbean Junior Championships (U-17)	Xalapa, Mexico	3rd	1000 m	2:38.8 A
1978	Central American and Caribbean Junior Championships (U-17)	Xalapa, Mexico	1st	3000 m	9:04.4 A
1980	Central American and Caribbean Junior Championships (U-20)	Nassau, Bahamas	4th	1500 m	3:53.7
1980	Central American and Caribbean Junior Championships (U-20)	Nassau, Bahamas	2nd	5000 m	14:27.4
1980	Central American and Caribbean Junior Championships (U-20)	Nassau, Bahamas	1st	3000 m steeplechase	9:27.8
1984	Olympic Games	Los Angeles, United States	36th	Marathon	2:20:33
1988	Ibero-American Championships	Mexico City, Mexico	1st	10,000m	29:51.09 A
1988	Olympic Games	Seoul, South Korea	11th	Marathon	2:13:58
