= Juan Felipe Ortiz =

Cuban long jumper

Juan Felipe Ortiz (born August 13, 1964) is a retired male long jumper who represented Cuba during his career. His main rival during the 1980s and early 1990s was Jaime Jefferson.

== Achievements ==
Year	Competition	Venue	Position	Event	Notes
Representing Cuba
1983	Central American and Caribbean Championships	Havana, Cuba	1st	Long jump	8.04 m
1983	Pan American Games	Caracas, Venezuela	3rd	Long jump	7.91 m
1990	Central American and Caribbean Games	Mexico City, Mexico	1st	Long jump	8.17 m
1991	World Indoor Championships	Seville, Spain	13th (q)	Long jump	7.74 m
1992	Ibero-American Championships	Seville, Spain	—	Long jump	NM
1993	Central American and Caribbean Championships	Cali, Colombia	3rd	Long jump	7.78 m
1993	Central American and Caribbean Championships	Cali, Colombia	3rd	4 × 100 m relay	39.72 s
