= Jacqueline Pusey =

Jamaican sprinter (born 1959)

Medal record

Women's athletics

Representing Jamaica

World Championships
Bronze medal – third place	1983 Helsinki	4×100 m relay

Representing Americas

IAAF World Cup
Bronze medal – third place	1981 Rome	400 m
Bronze medal – third place	1981 Rome	4×400 m relay

Jacqueline "Jackie" Pusey (born 14 August 1959) is a Jamaican former track and field sprinter. She competed over distances from 100 metres to 400 metres. She represented Jamaica at the 1976 Summer Olympics (being their youngest entrant at age 16) and competed a second time at the 1980 Summer Olympics.

Pusey won Jamaica's first world championship relay medal at the 1983 World Championships in Athletics, running in the 4×100 metres relay. She had her career peak in 1981 when she won bronze medals in the individual 400 m and relay at the 1981 IAAF World Cup and set two championship records to take a 200 metres/400 metres double at the Central American and Caribbean Championships in Athletics. As a result of her achievements that year, she was given the Jamaican Sportswoman of the Year award.

== Career ==
=== Junior career and Olympic debut ===
Born in Saint Mary Parish, Pusey attended St Mary High School and established herself as a promising sprinter at the Girls School Championships by breaking the 200 metres championship record. At the age of fifteen she took the 4×400 metres relay gold medal at the 1974 Central American and Caribbean Junior Championships in Athletics and was a 200 metres silver medallist at the senior 1975 Central American and Caribbean Championships in Athletics behind Lorna Forde.

Pusey made her Olympic debut at the age of sixteen and she was the youngest member of the Jamaican team for the 1976 Summer Olympics. She reached the semi-finals of the women's 200 m and helped the Jamaican 4×100 metres relay team to sixth place. She also ran with the 4×400 m relay team, but the Jamaican women failed to get the baton to the finish in the first round.

Pusey found senior success at regional level during her teenage years, repeating her 200 m silver medal at the 1977 Central American and Caribbean Championships in Athletics (this time behind Silvia Chivás), and a 4 × 100 m relay silver medal with Jamaica at the 1978 Central American and Caribbean Games. She was fifth place in the 200 m at the higher level 1979 Pan American Games. In junior level competitions she amassed many medals. She was the 100/200 m runner-up at the 1976 CARIFTA Games behind Bermuda's Debbie Jones, defeated Jones to win the 400 m at the 1977 CARIFTA Games, before ending her junior career with a quadruple gold medal win at the 1978 CARIFTA Games – she won the 200 m, 400 m, and both relays.

Pusey sprinted in the AIAW for the Cal State Los Angeles Golden Eagles track and field team, finishing 3rd in the 200 m at the 1980 AIAW Outdoor Track and Field Championships.

=== 1980 Olympics ===
Pusey was again selected for the 200 m and the relay teams for the 1980 Summer Olympics. In the women's 200 m she achieved a personal best run of 22.90 seconds in the semi-finals, but in fifth place she was narrowly outside of qualification for the final. The first relay event for Pusey was the 4×400 m. A quartet of Ruth Williams-Simpson, Pusey, Cathy Rattray and Merlene Ottey failed to progress beyond the first round. The shorter relay gave Pusey a better chance of an Olympic medal, with Ottey, Leleith Hodges and Rose Allwood being some of the Caribbean's best sprinters.

Despite the Jamaican 4 × 100 m relay team being the highest calibre one yet, practice for that event had not gone well, with Ottey repeatedly starting too early and not facilitating the change over with her teammates. The rest of the team felt Ottey overly focused on her individual events, to the detriment of the team event. Pusey also felt affronted by Ottey's demand to run the anchor leg of the relay (a position Pusey felt was her speciality) and the friction between the two athletes led to a last minute change. Allwood switched the middle legs with Pusey so she would not handover to Ottey, with Hodges remaining as starter. In the Olympic final, the team remained in contention until the final changeover, at which point Ottey again began too quickly, leading to a poor baton changeover. The team still ran a Jamaican national record of 43.19 seconds in sixth place, but Pusey felt her best chance of winning an Olympic medal was lost due to Ottey's mistake. Shortly after the Olympics, Pusey ran a personal best for the 200 m in London, recording a time of 22.82 seconds.

=== Career peak ===
Pusey's career peaked in the 1981 season. She achieved personal bests in the 100 m (11.29) and 400 m (51.38) that year in Ciudad Bolivar. The 1981 Central American and Caribbean Championships in Athletics saw her claim three gold medals and break three championship records. She won the 200 m in 23.35 seconds, the 400 m in 52.62 seconds, and the 4×100 m relay in 44.62 seconds. In addition, she was also part of the silver medal-winning 4×400 m relay team. She was easily the most successful athlete of the championships, as the only person to win more than two medals. In September she was chosen to compete for the Americas team at the 1981 IAAF World Cup. She became the first Jamaican woman to win a medal at the competition, taking the 400 m bronze in 51.48 seconds and also the 4×400 m relay bronze in an Americas team including Charmaine Crooks, Marita Payne and June Griffith. Alongside Bert Cameron (who was the men's 400 m bronze medallist) she became the first Jamaican athlete to win an individual IAAF World Cup medal (Don Quarrie had won a relay medal in 1977). At the end of this season she was selected at the Jamaican Sportswoman of the Year, dethroning Merlene Ottey, who had won twice consecutively (and who would have eleven further wins).

The final two years of Pusey's international career saw much success in relay events. At the 1982 Central American and Caribbean Games she anchored a 4×100 m relay team of Verónica Findlay, Cathy Rattray and Anthea Johnson to a silver medal behind Trinidad and Tobago. She led off a 4×400 m relay team composed of herself, Rattray, Johnson and Sandra Farmer, and the quartet secured the bronze medal in that event. Pusey was on both Jamaican relay teams for the inaugural 1983 World Championships in Athletics. She formed a team with her national rival Ottey, as well as Hodges and Juliet Cuthbert. The group completed the event in 42.73 seconds to win the bronze medal, which was the first ever world championships relay medal for their country. Pusey's final international outing (one day before her 24th birthday) was a run in the 4×400 m heats, where a team including Rattray, Ovrill Dwyer-Brown and Grace Jackson were eliminated in fourth place.

== Personal bests ==
- 100 metres – 11.29 seconds (1981)
- 200 metres – 22.82 seconds (1980)
- 400 metres – 51.38 seconds (1981)

== International competitions ==
Year	Competition	Venue	Position	Event	Notes
1974	CAC Junior Championships	Maracaibo, Venezuela	1st	4 × 400 m relay	3:51.91 CR
1975	CAC Championships	Ponce, Puerto Rico	2nd	200 m	24.4
1975	CARIFTA Games	Hamilton, Bermuda	2nd	200 m	24.1
1975	CARIFTA Games	Hamilton, Bermuda	2nd	400 m	57.0
1976	CARIFTA Games	Nassau, Bahamas	2nd	100 m	11.9
1976	CARIFTA Games	Nassau, Bahamas	2nd	200 m	23.7
1976	CARIFTA Games	Nassau, Bahamas	1st	4 × 400 m relay	3:46.4
1976	Olympic Games	Montreal, Canada	7th (semis)	200 m	23.31
1976	Olympic Games	Montreal, Canada	6th	4 × 100 m relay	43.24
1976	Olympic Games	Montreal, Canada	— (heats)	4 × 400 m relay	DQ
1977	CARIFTA Games	Bridgetown, Barbados	1st	400 m	54.00
1977	CAC Championships	Xalapa, Mexico	2nd	200 m	23.82
1978	CARIFTA Games	Nassau, Bahamas	1st	200 m	24.13
1978	CARIFTA Games	Nassau, Bahamas	1st	400 m	55.85
1978	CARIFTA Games	Nassau, Bahamas	1st	4 × 100 m relay	46.49
1978	CARIFTA Games	Nassau, Bahamas	1st	4 × 400 m relay	3:51.54
1978	CAC Games	Medellín, Colombia	2nd	4 × 100 m relay	44.41
1979	Pan American Games	San Juan, Puerto Rico	5th	200 m	23.08
1980	Olympic Games	Moscow, Soviet Union	5th (semis)	200 m	22.90
1980	Olympic Games	Moscow, Soviet Union	6th	4 × 100 m relay	43.19
1980	Olympic Games	Moscow, Soviet Union	4th (heats)	4 × 400 m relay	3:31.5
1981	CAC Championships	Santo Domingo, Dominican Republic	1st	200 m	23.35 CR
1981	CAC Championships	Santo Domingo, Dominican Republic	1st	400 m	52.62 CR
1981	CAC Championships	Santo Domingo, Dominican Republic	1st	4 × 100 m relay	44.62
1981	CAC Championships	Santo Domingo, Dominican Republic	2nd	4 × 400 m relay	3:40.00
1981	IAAF World Cup	Rome, Italy	3rd	400 m	51.48
1981	IAAF World Cup	Rome, Italy	3rd	4 × 400 m relay	3:26.42
1982	CAC Games	Havana, Cuba	2nd	4 × 100 m relay	45.77
1982	CAC Games	Havana, Cuba	3rd	4 × 400 m relay	3:37.86
1983	World Championships	Helsinki, Finland	3rd	4 × 100 m relay	42.73
1983	World Championships	Helsinki, Finland	9th	4 × 400 m relay	3:34.17
