= 1976 CARIFTA Games =

V CARIFTA Games
- Dates: April 19–20
- Host city: Nassau, Bahamas (The Bahamas)
- Level: Junior and Youth
- Events: 39
- Participation: about 76 athletes from 8 nations

The 5th CARIFTA Games was held in Nassau, Bahamas on April 19–20, 1976.

== Participation (unofficial) ==
Detailed result lists can be found on the "World Junior Athletics History" website. An unofficial count yields the number of about 76 athletes (55 junior (under-20) and 21 youth (under-17)) from about 9 countries: Bahamas (19), Barbados (6), Bermuda (18), British Virgin Islands (1), Guadeloupe (1), Guyana (3), Jamaica (20), Trinidad and Tobago (8).

== Medal summary ==
Medal winners are published by category: Boys under 20 (Junior), Girls under 20 (Junior), Boys under 17 (Youth), and Girls under 17 (Youth). Complete results can be found on the "World Junior Athletics History" website.

=== Boys under 20 (Junior) ===
Event	Gold		Silver		Bronze	
100 metres	Everard Samuels (JAM)	10.7	Rickey Moxey (BAH)	10.8	Gregory Simons (BER)	10.8
200 metres	Everard Samuels (JAM)	21.7	Rickey Moxey (BAH)	21.7	Gregory Simons (BER)	22.0
400 metres	Anthony Lyons (TRI)	48.3	Anthony October (GUY)	48.4	Dennis Henry (JAM)	48.7
800 metres	Trevor Small (BAR)	1:54.4	Oliver Alves (GUY)	1:56.4	D. Luton (JAM)	1:57.1
1500 metres	Trevor Small (BAR)	4:03.8	Sylvester Smith (JAM)	4:05.0	Anthony West (TRI)	4:06.3
3000 metres	Trevor Small (BAR)	8:48.2	Oliver Alves (GUY)	8:49.6	Sylvester Smith (JAM)	8:52.6
110 metres hurdles	Jocelyn Wynter (JAM)	15.0	Mark Stoute (BAR)	15.4	Antoine Stirling (BER)	15.6
400 metres hurdles	Everton DaCosta (JAM)	54.6	Jocelyn Wynter (JAM)	56.5	Mark Stoute (BAR)	56.9
High jump	Winston Strachan (BAH)	1.93	Wildgoose (BAH)	1.85	Curtis Charles (BER)	1.83
Pole vault	Ricardo Lightbourne (BAH)	3.50	Carty (JAM)	3.20	Derek Hill (BER)	3.05
Long jump	Ken Brimmer (BER)	7.28	Steve Hanna (BAH)	7.06	Winston Strachan (BAH)	6.98
Triple jump	Steve Hanna (BAH)	15.52	Ken Brimmer (BER)	15.36	Curtis Charles (BER)	14.32
Shot put	Brad Cooper (BAH)	15.71	Dilton Woodley (BER)	15.14	Tex Innerarity (JAM)	14.55
Discus throw	Brad Cooper (BAH)	53.62	Dilton Woodley (BER)	48.34	Stanley Goodridge (JAM)	46.26
Javelin throw	Durant (BER)	57.20	Marlon Gocking (TRI)	55.04	Clarke (BAH)	53.92
4 × 100 metres relay	Bermuda	42.1	Bahamas	42.1	Jamaica	42.8
4 × 400 metres relay	Jamaica	3:16.8	Bermuda	3:19.3	Barbados	3:20.5

=== Girls under 20 (Junior) ===
Event	Gold		Silver		Bronze	
100 metres	Debbie Jones (BER)	11.7	Jackie Pusey (JAM)	11.9	Shonel Ferguson (BAH)	11.9
200 metres	Debbie Jones (BER)	23.6	Jackie Pusey (JAM)	23.7	Maureen Gottshalk (JAM)	24.6
400 metres	Debbie Jones (BER)	54.8	Verone Webber (JAM)	55.4	Reva Knight (JAM)	57.0
800 metres	Carletta McNabb (JAM)	2:16.2	Gina Smith (BER)	2:16.5	Diane Nancis (TRI)	2:18.5
1500 metres	Lavonne Roberts (BAR)	4:49.0	Diane Nancis (TRI)	4:51.6	Carletta McNabb (JAM)	4:53.8
100 metres hurdles (3.4 m/s)	Ann Adams (TRI)	14.5w	Sonia Smith (BER)	15.0w	June Caddle (BAR)	15.1w
High jump	June Griffith (GUY)	1.65	Grace Jackson (JAM)	1.65	Monica Johnson (BER)	1.625
Long jump	Shonel Ferguson (BAH)	6.20	June Griffith (GUY)	5.66	Sonia Smith (BER)	5.53
Shot put	Lucy Russel (BAH)	12.88	Ninette Sacco (GLP)	12.35	Lynette Adams (BER)	11.94
Discus throw	Elnur Smith (BAH)	37.40	Beryl Bethel (BAH)	32.94	Bessie Horton (BER)	32.14
Javelin throw	Lyn George (TRI)	43.16	J. Porter (BAH)	36.48	Lucy Russel (BAH)	35.94
4 × 100 metres relay	Jamaica	45.7	Bermuda	46.5	Trinidad and Tobago	48.4
4 × 400 metres relay	Jamaica; Reva Knight; Verone Webber; Jackie Pusey; Maureen Gottshalk	3:46.4	Bermuda	3:50.4	Trinidad and Tobago	3:56.7

=== Boys under 17 (Youth) ===
Event	Gold		Silver		Bronze	
100 metres	Peter Hibbert (JAM)	11.3	Eric Berrie (BAR)	11.4	E. McQueen (BAH)	11.4
200 metres	Peter Hibbert (JAM)	22.6	Eric Berrie (BAR)	22.8	Anthony Capron (BAH)	23.1
400 metres	Michael Swan (BER)	51.0	C. Williams (JAM)	51.0	Anthony Bullard (BAH)	51.6
Long jump	Brian Brangman (BER)	6.79w	K. Clarke (BAH)	6.61	Dwight Davis (JAM)	6.53
Triple jump	Colin Thompson (BAH)	13.64	Dwight Davis (JAM)	13.32	Brian Brangman (BER)	13.19

=== Girls under 17 (Youth) ===
Event	Gold		Silver		Bronze	
100 metres	Doreen Small (JAM)	12.3	L. Richardson (BAH)	12.5	Esther Hope (TRI)	12.5
200 metres	Esther Hope (TRI)	25.3	L. Richardson (BAH)	25.4	Donna Burgess (BER)	25.4
400 metres	Gina Smith (BER)	59.1	Eunice Greene (BAH)	59.4	J. Roach (TRI)	59.8
Long jump	Sharol Henry (JAM)	5.66	Sonia Smith (BER)	5.59	Pamela Alleyne (BAR)	5.55

== Medal table (unofficial) ==
* Host nation (Bahamas)

Rank	Nation	Gold	Silver	Bronze	Total
1	Jamaica (JAM)	12	9	10	31
2	Bahamas (BAH)*	9	11	7	27
3	Bermuda (BER)	9	9	12	30
4	Barbados (BAR)	4	3	4	11
5	Trinidad and Tobago (TTO)	4	2	6	12
6	Guyana (GUY)	1	4	0	5
7	Guadeloupe (GLP)	0	1	0	1
Totals (7 entries)		39	39	39	117
