= Wilfredo Almonte =

Dominican Republic long jumper

Wilfredo Almonte (born 22 November 1958) is a retired Dominican Republic long jumper.

He finished seventh at the 1979 Pan American Games (triple jump), won the silver medal at the 1982 Central American and Caribbean Games, and finished sixth at the 1983 Pan American Games. He also competed at the 1983 World Championships in both the 100 metres and the long jump without reaching the final of either.

His personal best jump leading up to the World Championships was 7.89 metres, achieved in June 1983 in San Juan, Puerto Rico.

== International competitions ==
Year	Competition	Venue	Position	Event	Notes
Representing the Dominican Republic
1978	Central American and Caribbean Games	Medellín, Colombia	5th	Long jump	7.65 m
1978	Central American and Caribbean Games	Medellín, Colombia	6th	Triple jump	15.25 m
1979	Pan American Games	San Juan, Puerto Rico	7th	Triple jump	15.69 m
1982	Central American and Caribbean Games	Havana, Cuba	3rd	4 × 100 m relay	40.11 s
1982	Central American and Caribbean Games	Havana, Cuba	2nd	Long jump	7.82 m
1983	World Championships	Helsinki, Finland	38th (h)	100 m	10.72 s
1983	World Championships	Helsinki, Finland	25th (q)	Long jump	7.38 m m
1983	Pan American Games	Caracas, Venezuela	10th (sf)	100 m	10.57 s
1983	Pan American Games	Caracas, Venezuela	6th	Long jump	7.61 m
