= Steve Hanna =

Bahamian triple jumper

Steven George Hanna (Birth date: 30 October 1958 in Nassau, Bahamas) is a Bahamian triple jumper who competed in the 1984 Summer Olympics and in the 1988 Summer Olympics. He won a silver medal in the long jump at the 1982 Commonwealth Games, and at the same games finished fourth in the triple jump.

Steven Hanna jumped 56’1 in the CAC Games in Nassau representing The Bahamas.

Mr. Hanna was the 1980 and 1981 NCAA Triple Jump Champion competing for the University of Texas-El Paso. Steve anchored two NCAA titles in Track and Field for the UTEP Miners.

== International competitions ==
| Year | Competition | Venue | Position | Event | Notes |
Representing the Bahamas
| 1976 | CARIFTA Games (U20) | Nassau, Bahamas | 2nd | Long jump | 7.06 m |
| 1976 | CARIFTA Games (U20) | Nassau, Bahamas | 1st | Triple jump | 15.52 m |
| 1976 | Central American and Caribbean; Junior Championships (U20) | Xalapa, Mexico | 2nd | Triple jump | 14.72 m |
| 1977 | CARIFTA Games (U20) | Bridgetown, Barbados | 1st | Long jump | 7.35 m |
| 1977 | CARIFTA Games (U20) | Bridgetown, Barbados | 1st | Triple jump | 7.35 m |
| 1977 | Central American and Caribbean Championships | Xalapa, Mexico | 3rd | Long jump | 7.68 m |
| 1978 | Central American and Caribbean Games | Medellín, Colombia | 4th | 4 × 400 m relay | 3:12.92 |
| 1978 | Central American and Caribbean Games | Medellín, Colombia | 4th | Long jump | 7.72 m |
| 1978 | Central American and Caribbean Games | Medellín, Colombia | 1st | Triple jump | 16.60 m |
| 1978 | Commonwealth Games | Edmonton, Canada | 143rd (q) | Long jump | 7.22 m |
| 1978 | Commonwealth Games | Edmonton, Canada | 7th | Triple jump | 15.97 m |
| 1980 | Liberty Bell Classic | Philadelphia, United States | 3rd | Triple jump | 16.42 m |
| 1981 | Central American and Caribbean Championships | Santo Domingo, Dominican Republic | 1st | Triple jump | 16.76 m |
| 1982 | Central American and Caribbean Games | Havana, Cuba | 3rd | Long jump | 7.80 m |
| 1982 | Central American and Caribbean Games | Havana, Cuba | 1st | Triple jump | 16.73 m |
| 1982 | Commonwealth Games | Brisbane, Australia | 2nd | Long jump | 7.79 m |
| 1982 | Commonwealth Games | Brisbane, Australia | 4th | Triple jump | 16.56 m |
| 1983 | World Championships | Helsinki, Finland | 12th | Triple jump | 14.96 m |
| 1983 | Pan American Games | Caracas, Venezuela | 5th | Long jump | 7.66 m |
| 1984 | Olympic Games | Los Angeles, United States | 21st (q) | Long jump | 7.10 m |
| 1984 | Olympic Games | Los Angeles, United States | 14th (q) | Triple jump | 16.14 m |
| 1985 | Central American and Caribbean Championships | Nassau, Bahamas | 1st | Triple jump | 17.07 m |
| 1986 | Goodwill Games | Moscow, Soviet Union | 10th | Triple jump | 16.25 m |
| 1987 | World Indoor Championships | Indianapolis, United States | 11th | Triple jump | 16.09 m |
| 1987 | Central American and Caribbean Championships | Caracas, Venezuela | 3rd | Triple jump | 16.32 m |
| 1987 | Pan American Games | Indianapolis, United States | 5th | Triple jump | 16.47 m |
| 1988 | Olympic Games | Seoul, South Korea | 24th (q) | Long jump | 7.54 m |
| 1989 | Central American and Caribbean Championships | San Juan, Puerto Rico | 3rd | Triple jump | 16.07 m |

== Personal bests ==
Outdoor

- Long jump – 7.86 (Nassau 1977)
- Triple jump – 17.04 (Baton Rouge 1981)

Indoor

- Long jump – 7.82 (1987)
- Triple jump – 16.87 (Johnson City 1981)
