= Athletics at the 1983 Summer Universiade – Women's javelin throw =

Athletics event

The women's javelin throw event at the 1983 Summer Universiade was held at the Commonwealth Stadium in Edmonton, Canada on 9 July 1983.

== Results ==
Rank	Athlete	Nationality	Result	Notes
1st place, gold medalist(s)	Beate Peters	West Germany	66.86	
2nd place, silver medalist(s)	Fausta Quintavalla	Italy	63.06	
3rd place, bronze medalist(s)	Mayra Vila	Cuba	62.34	
4	Szada Kirkwidre	Soviet Union	58.04	
5	Ding Fenghua	China	56.70	
6	Emi Matsui	Japan	56.20	
7	Patty Kearney	United States	53.32	
8	Sue Gibson	Canada	51.40	
9	Céline Chartrand	Canada	50.84	
10	Sonia Smith	Bermuda	49.58	
11	Dianne Carr	United States	44.18	
12	Margaret Nasike	Uganda	35.72	
13	Leila Alameddine	Lebanon	32.52	
