= Vesco Bradley =

American long jumper and sprinter

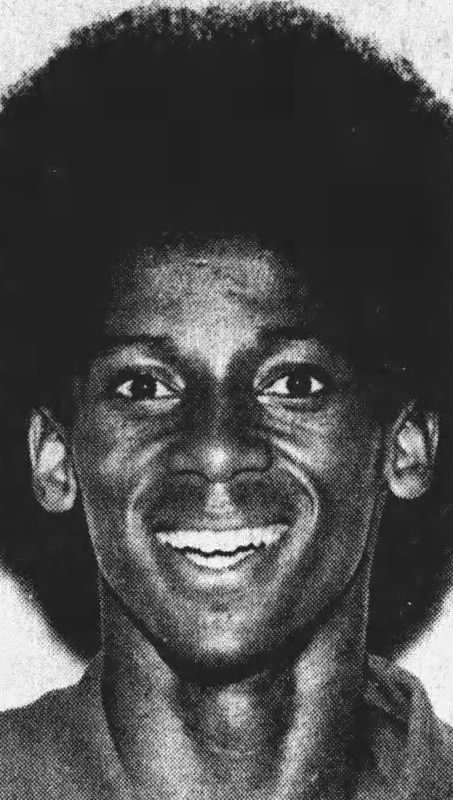
- Bradley in 1974

Personal information
- Born: May 22, 1953 (age 73)

Sport
- Country: United States
- Sport: Athletics
- Events: Long jump 100-yard dash 220-yard dash

Achievements and titles
- Personal bests: 100 yd: 9.3 (1975); 220 yd: 20.9 (1975); Long jump: 7.9 m (25 ft 11 in) (1975)
Medal record
Representing United States
Pan American Games
Athletics
Silver medal – second place	1983 Caracas	Men's long jump

Vesco Bradley (born May 22, 1953) is an American long jumper and sprinter.

== Life and career ==
Bradley attended Seminole Junior College.

Bradley competed at the 1983 Pan American Games, winning the silver medal in the men's long jump event.
