= Eldece Clarke-Lewis =

Bahamian sprinter

Personal information
- Born: 13 January 1965 (age 61)

Sport
- Sport: Track and field
Medal record
Women's Athletics
Representing Bahamas
Olympic Games
Gold medal – first place	2000 Sydney	4 × 100 m relay
Silver medal – second place	1996 Atlanta	4 × 100 m relay
World Athletics Championships
Gold medal – first place	1999 Seville	4 x 100 m relay
CAC Junior Championships (U20)
Gold medal – first place	1982 Bridgetown	100 m
Silver medal – second place	1982 Bridgetown	4 × 100 m relay
Bronze medal – third place	1982 Bridgetown	200 m
CARIFTA Games Junior (U20)
Silver medal – second place	1984 Nassau	100 m
Bronze medal – third place	1982 Kingston	200 m
CARIFTA Games Youth (U17)
Bronze medal – third place	1980 Hamilton	100 m
Bronze medal – third place	1981 Nassau	200 m

Eldece Clarke-Lewis (born 13 January 1965) is a Bahamian sprints athlete. She was a part of the Bahamian team that won the silver medal in the 1996 Olympics 4 × 100 metres relay. She also ran in the preliminary rounds in the 2000 Olympics 4 × 100 meters relay in Sydney, this would later get her the gold medal as the Bahamian team won in the final.

== Achievements ==
Year	Competition	Venue	Position	Event	Notes
Representing the Bahamas
1980	CARIFTA Games (U-17)	Hamilton, Bermuda	3rd	100 m	12.0
1980	CARIFTA Games (U-17)	Hamilton, Bermuda	6th	200 m	26.09
1981	CARIFTA Games (U-17)	Nassau, Bahamas	4th	100 m	12.1
1981	CARIFTA Games (U-17)	Nassau, Bahamas	3rd	100 m	24.80
1982	CARIFTA Games (U-20)	Kingston, Jamaica	5th	100 m	12.16
1982	CARIFTA Games (U-20)	Kingston, Jamaica	3rd	200 m	24.7
1982	Central American and Caribbean Junior Championships (U-20)	Bridgetown, Barbados	1st	100 m	11.80
1982	Central American and Caribbean Junior Championships (U-20)	Bridgetown, Barbados	3rd	200 m	24.20
1982	Central American and Caribbean Junior Championships (U-20)	Bridgetown, Barbados	2nd	4 × 100 m relay	47.13
1984	CARIFTA Games (U-20)	Nassau, Bahamas	2nd	100 m	11.3
