= Lyndon Sands =

Bahamian long jumper

Personal information
- Nationality: Bahamian
- Born: 6 February 1964 (age 62)
- Height: 1.78 m (5 ft 10 in)
- Weight: 62 kg (137 lb)

Sport
- Sport: Athletics
- Event: Long jump

Lyndon Sands (born 6 February 1964) is a Bahamian athlete. He competed in the men's long jump at the 1984 Summer Olympics.

Sands is from Nassau, Bahamas where he attended Government High School. He won the U17 gold medal in the triple jump at the 1980 CARIFTA Games and the bronze medal the inaugural 1980 Pan American Junior Athletics Championships, followed by winning gold in the U20 triple jump at the 1981 CARIFTA Games. He was an All-American jumper for the Houston Cougars track and field team, finishing 5th in the long jump at the 1986 NCAA Division I Outdoor Track and Field Championships.

At the 1984 Olympics, Sands finished 19th in the long jump.
