= Ken Robinson (sprinter) =

American sprinter (1963-2019)

Personal information
- Born: July 15, 1963 Omaha, Nebraska, United States
- Died: May 10, 2019 (aged 55) Nederland, Colorado, United States

Sport
- Sport: Track and field
Medal record
Representing United States
Pan American Games
Gold medal – first place	1983 Caracas	4x100m relay
Summer Universiade
Gold medal – first place	1983 Edmonton	4x100m relay

Ken Robinson (July 15, 1963 – May 10, 2019) was an American sprinter.

Robinson attended Berkeley High School in California where he was considered a top high school sprinting prospect. He was an All-American sprinter for the Arizona State Sun Devils track and field team, placing 4th in the 4 × 100 meters relay at the 1983 NCAA Division I Outdoor Track and Field Championships. He won gold medals on the U.S. relay team at the 1983 Pan American Games and 1983 World University Games.

His brother James Robinson was an Olympic 800 metres runner. Ken later worked for the Tempe Police Department and then became a coach in Nederland, Colorado. He died on May 10, 2019.
