= Marieta Riera =

Venezuelan javelin thrower (born 1963)

Personal information
- Full name: Marieta Milagros Riera Luzardo
- Born: 23 December 1963 (age 62)

Sport
- Country: Venezuela
- Sport: Women's Athletics
Medal record
Women's athletics
Representing Venezuela
Pan American Games
Bronze medal – third place	1983 Caracas	Javelin throw
Bronze medal – third place	1987 Indianapolis	Javelin throw
South American Games
Silver medal – second place	1994 Valencia	Javelin throw
Bolivarian Games
Gold medal – first place	1989 Maracaibo	Javelin throw
Bronze medal – third place	1997 Arequipa	Javelin throw
CAC Junior Championships (U20)
Silver medal – second place	1980 Nassau	Javelin throw
Silver medal – second place	1982 Bridgetown	Javelin throw

Marieta Milagros Riera Luzardo (born 23 December 1963) is a retired Venezuelan track and field athlete who competed in the women's javelin throw competition during her career.

== Achievements ==
Year	Competition	Venue	Position	Event	Notes
Representing Venezuela
1980	Central American and Caribbean Junior Championships (U-20)	Nassau, Bahamas	2nd	Javelin	44.06 m
1982	Central American and Caribbean Junior Championships (U-20)	Bridgetown, Barbados	2nd	Javelin	49.55 m
1982	Central American and Caribbean Games	Havana, Cuba	3rd	Javelin	51.50 m
1983	Pan American Games	Caracas, Venezuela	3rd	Javelin	53.60 m
1983	South American Championships	Santa Fe, Argentina	1st	Javelin	51.04 m CR
1986	Central American and Caribbean Games	Santiago, Dominican Republic	4th	Javelin	53.86 m
1987	Central American and Caribbean Championships	Caracas, Venezuela	2nd	Javelin	55.14 m
1987	Pan American Games	Indianapolis, United States	3rd	Javelin	57.10 m
1988	Ibero-American Championships	Mexico City, Mexico	4th	Javelin	51.80 m A
1989	Bolivarian Games	Maracaibo, Venezuela	1st	Javelin	54.22 m
1989	South American Championships	Medellín, Colombia	2nd	Javelin	54.70 m A
1990	Central American and Caribbean Games	Mexico City, Mexico	3rd	Javelin	51.86 m A
1991	South American Championships	Manaus, Brazil	1st	Javelin	57.40 m CR
1991	Pan American Games	Havana, Cuba	8th	Javelin	50.04 m
1992	Ibero-American Championships	Seville, Spain	4th	Javelin	50.42 m
1994	South American Games	Valencia, Venezuela	2nd	Javelin	50.64 m
1996	Ibero-American Championships	Medellín, Colombia	6th	Javelin	49.14 m
1997	Bolivarian Games	Arequipa, Peru	3rd	Javelin	49.58 m A
