= Lester Benjamin =

Antigua and Barbuda long jumper

Personal information
- Born: 14 September 1963 (age 62)

Sport
- Sport: Athletics
- Team: Antigua and Barbuda

Lester Benjamin (born 14 September 1963) is an Antiguan and Barbudan retired long jumper.

Representing the Georgia Bulldogs track and field team, Benjamin won the 1984 NCAA Division I Outdoor Track and Field Championships in the 4 × 100 m relay.

Benjamin competed at the 1983 World Championships, the 1984 Olympic Games and the 1987 World Championships, but did not reach the final round. He finished fourth in the long jump at the 1983 and 1987 Pan American Games.

His personal best jump was 8.02 metres, achieved in May 1984 in Baton Rouge. This is the national record.

== International competitions ==
Representing Antigua and Barbuda
Year	Competition	Venue	Position	Event	Result	Notes
1978	CARIFTA Games (U-17)	Nassau, Bahamas	2nd	Triple jump	14.11 m	
1979	CARIFTA Games (U-17)	Kingston, Jamaica	4th	100 m	11.47	
1979	CARIFTA Games (U-17)	Kingston, Jamaica	2nd	Long jump	6.93 m	
1979	CARIFTA Games (U-17)	Kingston, Jamaica	2nd	Triple jump	14.38 m	
1980	CARIFTA Games (U-20)	Hamilton, Bermuda	4th	Long jump	6.99 m	
1980	CARIFTA Games (U-20)	Hamilton, Bermuda	2nd	Triple jump	15.11 m	
1980	Central American and Caribbean Junior Championships (U-20)	Nassau, Bahamas	8th	100 m		
1980	Central American and Caribbean Junior Championships (U-20)	Nassau, Bahamas	1st	Long jump	7.01 m	
1981	CARIFTA Games (U-20)	Nassau, Bahamas	2nd	100 m	10.6	
1981	CARIFTA Games (U-20)	Nassau, Bahamas	6th	Long jump	6.88 m	
1981	CARIFTA Games (U-20)	Nassau, Bahamas	2nd	Triple jump	15.28 m	
1982	CARIFTA Games (U-20)	Kingston, Jamaica	3rd	100 m	10.74	
1982	CARIFTA Games (U-20)	Kingston, Jamaica	2nd	Long jump	7.20 m	
1982	CARIFTA Games (U-20)	Kingston, Jamaica	1st	Triple jump	15.32 m	
1982	Central American and Caribbean Junior Championships (U-20)	Bridgetown, Barbados	3rd	100 m	10.60	
1982	Central American and Caribbean Junior Championships (U-20)	Bridgetown, Barbados	2nd	Long jump	7.53 m	
1982	Central American and Caribbean Junior Championships (U-20)	Bridgetown, Barbados	1st	Triple jump	15.83 m	
1983	World Championships	Helsinki, Finland	15th	Long jump	7.81 m	
1984	Olympic Games	Los Angeles, United States	15th	Long jump	7.57 m	
1987	World Championships	Rome, Italy	—	Long jump	NM	
