= Marcia Tate =

Jamaican sprinter

Personal information
- Nationality: Jamaican
- Born: 23 June 1961 (age 64)

Sport
- Sport: Sprinting
- Event: 4 × 400 metres relay

Marcia Tate (born 23 June 1961) is a Jamaican sprinter. She competed in the women's 4 × 400 metres relay at the 1988 Summer Olympics.

Tate competed collegiately for the Nebraska Cornhuskers track and field team, where she finished 4th in the 600 yards at the 1982 AIAW Indoor Track and Field Championships.
