= Alfred Browne =

Antigua and Barbuda sprinter

Personal information
- Nationality: Antigua and Barbuda
- Born: 1 July 1959 (age 66)

Sport
- Sport: Sprinting
- Event: 400 metres

Alfred Browne (born 1 July 1959) is an Antigua and Barbuda sprinter. He competed in the 400 metres at the 1984 Summer Olympics and the 1988 Summer Olympics.
