= Marlene Lewis =

Jamaican discus thrower

Personal information
- Nationality: Jamaican
- Born: 4 October 1962
- Died: 7 July 2017 (aged 54)

Sport
- Sport: Athletics
- Event: Discus throw

Marlene Lewis (4 October 1962 – 7 July 2017) was a Jamaican athlete. She competed in the women's discus throw at the 1984 Summer Olympics.
