= Sharon Powell =

Jamaican sprinter

Personal information
- Nationality: Jamaican
- Born: 16 July 1965 (age 61)

Sport
- Sport: Athletics
- Events: 400 metres, 800 metres

Sharon Powell (born 16 July 1965) is a Jamaican former track and field athlete. She competed in the 800 metres and 4 × 400 metres relay at the 1988 Seoul Olympics, finishing fifth in the final of the relay.

Powell is from Clarendon, Jamaica. Competing for the Nebraska Cornhuskers track and field team, she won the 1988 NCAA Division I Outdoor Track and Field Championships in the 800 m.

== International competitions ==
Year	Competition	Venue	Position	Event	Notes
Representing Jamaica
1988	Olympic Games	Seoul, South Korea	20th (h)	800 m	2:03.49
1988	Olympic Games	Seoul, South Korea	5th	4 × 400 m	3:23.13
(h) Indicates overall position in qualifying heats
