= Ruperta Charles =

Antigua and Barbuda sprinter (born 1962)

Personal information
- Nationality: Antigua and Barbuda
- Born: 25 August 1962 (age 63)

Sport
- Sport: Sprinting
- Event: 100 metres

Ruperta Charles (born 25 August 1962) is an Antigua and Barbuda sprinter. She competed in the women's 100 metres at the 1984 Summer Olympics.

Charles competed for the Howard Bison track and field team in the NCAA. She is the mother of WNBA player Kaila Charles and Olympic sprinter Afia Charles. She is also the cousin of Canadian long jumper Tabia Charles.
