= Desmond Morris (athlete) =

Jamaican high jumper

Personal information
- Nationality: Jamaican
- Born: 6 January 1961
- Died: 7 January 1989 (aged 28)

Sport
- Sport: Athletics
- Event: High jump

Desmond Morris (6 January 1961 – 7 January 1989) was a Jamaican athlete. He competed in the men's high jump at the 1980 Summer Olympics and the 1984 Summer Olympics.

Morris competed for the Texas Longhorns men's track and field team in the NCAA.
