= Margaret Critchley =

British sprinter

Margaret Critchley married name Williams
Personal information
- Nationality: British (English)
- Born: 4 April 1949 (age 77) Bristol, England
- Height: 160 cm (5 ft 3 in)
- Weight: 48 kg (106 lb)

Sport
- Sport: Athletics
- Event: Sprinting
- Club: Bristol & West AC
Medal record
Athletics
Representing England
Commonwealth Games
Bronze medal – third place	1970 Edinburgh	200m
Silver medal – second place	1970 Edinburgh	4 x 100m relay

Margaret Ann Critchley married name Williams (born 4 April 1949) is a British retired international sprinter who competed at the 1972 Summer Olympics.

== Biography ==
Critchley became the national 200 metres champion after winning the British WAAA Championships title at the 1970 WAAA Championships. Shortly afterwards she represented England and won a silver medal in the 4 x 100 metres relay and a bronze medal in the 200 metres, at the 1970 British Commonwealth Games in Edinburgh, Scotland.

At the 1972 Olympics Games in Munich, she represented Great Britain in the women's 200 metres competition.

Critchley married Andrew Williams in late 1973 and competed under her married name thereafter.

Williams finished second behind Denise Ramsden in the 200 metres event at the 1976 WAAA Championships.
