= Oralee Fowler =

Bahamian sprinter

Personal information
- Nationality: Bahamian
- Born: 26 August 1961 (age 64)

Sport
- Sport: Sprinting
- Event: 4 × 100 metres relay

Oralee Fowler (born 26 August 1961) is a Bahamian sprinter. She competed in the women's 4 × 100 metres relay at the 1984 Summer Olympics.

Fowler competed in the AIAW for the UCLA Bruins track and field team, anchoring them to a 4 × 440 yards relay runner-up finish at the 1980 AIAW Outdoor Track and Field Championships.
