= Steve Wray =

Bahamian high jumper

Personal information
- Born: Stephen Wray; 20 May 1962 Nassau, Bahamas
- Died: 22 December 2009 (aged 47) southwest of Nassau
- Height: 1.83 m (6 ft 0 in)
- Weight: 75 kg (165 lb)

Sport
- Country: Bahamas
- Sport: Athletics
Medal record
Men's Athletics
Commonwealth Games
Silver medal – second place	1982 Brisbane	High jump

Stephen Wray (20 May 1962 – 22 December 2009) was a Bahamian former athlete who competed mostly as a high jumper.

== Biography ==
Wray is best known for winning a silver medal in the high jump at the 1982 Commonwealth Games in Brisbane, in which he set a personal best and equalled the Commonwealth record, 2.31 metres. Over the course of the event he bettered his previous career best jump (2.23m) three times, clearing 2.25m and then 2.28m, before drawing level with Canada's Milton Ottey on 2.31m. He only lost out on the gold medal to Ottey on count-back, as the Canadian had made the clearance in his first attempt.

At the 1983 World Championships in Athletics, Wray competed in the high jump competition, but couldn't force his way into the final.

He also competed at the 1984 Summer Olympics, where he was unable to register a successful jump.

On 22 December 2009, both Wray and another fisherman were on a boat which overturned off the coast of Nassau. His body was never recovered.
