= Dennis Wallace =

Jamaican sprinter

Personal information
- Nationality: Jamaican
- Born: 10 July 1962 (age 64)

Sport
- Sport: Sprinting
- Event: 4 × 400 metres relay

Dennis Wallace (born 10 July 1962) is a Jamaican sprinter. He competed in the men's 4 × 400 metres relay at the 1984 Summer Olympics.
