= Athletics at the 1984 Summer Olympics – Women's 200 metres =

Women's 200 metres at the Games of the XXIII Olympiad
- Venue: Los Angeles Memorial Coliseum
- Dates: 8 August 1984 (heats and quarter-finals); 9 August 1984 (semi-finals and finals)
- Competitors: 37 from 28 nations
- Winning time: 21.81 OR

Medalists
1st place, gold medalist(s)		Valerie Brisco-Hooks; United States
2nd place, silver medalist(s)		Florence Griffith; United States
3rd place, bronze medalist(s)		Merlene Ottey-Page; Jamaica

These are the official results of the Women's 200m metres event at the 1984 Summer Olympics in Los Angeles, California. The final was held on August 9, 1984, and was won by 0.23 seconds by Valerie Brisco-Hooks.

Coming into the final, future world record holder Florence Griffith had the fastest times in both the heats and semi final rounds. The winner of the other semi final, one hundredth behind was Valerie Brisco-Hooks, who had already won the 400 metres title. Brisco-Hooks, coming back after a 40 pounds (18 kg) weight gain during her pregnancy two years earlier, was not touted as a potential multi gold medalist, unlike her American teammate Carl Lewis whose performance was virtually expected. She did not accomplish the 200/400 double at the Olympic Trials.

In the final, Florence Griffith, running in lane four, the middle of the track, took the early lead through the turn. Griffith easily made up the stagger on her American teammate Randy Givens to her outside just after completing half the turn. In lane 2, Merlene Ottey-Page was the closest challenger, gaining on Kathy Cook between her and Griffith. Out in lane 7, Brisco-Hooks caught Grace Jackson to her outside shortly after Griffith had passed Givens. At the end of the turn, Griffith had a slight advantage on Ottey-Page, a metre up on Brisco-Hooks who was just slightly ahead of Cook. All the way down the home straight Griffith held her advantage over Ottey-Page, but Brisco-Hooks was in a different gear. Halfway down the straight, Brisco-Hooks had already caught the pair and was pulling away to an easy 3 metre victory. In the last 40 metres, Cook closed ground rapidly, diving for the line and just missing the bronze medal from Ottey-Page, while Griffith was less than a half a metre ahead. Jackson came from last position at the end of the turn to finish a metre behind Ottey-Page and Cook.

Brisco-Hoocks accomplished the first 200-400 double in the Olympics. This was the second step of three gold medals in the single games won by Brisco-Hooks. To this point in history, only Fanny Blankers-Koen with 4 in 1948, and Betty Cuthbert in 1956 were the only women to have achieved this in Athletics. Four years later, Griffith under her new married name Florence Griffith-Joyner, would also achieve three golds along with the silver medal in the 4x400 relay (where she took the baton from Brisco-Hooks). This was the third medal out of what would become nine career Olympic medals for Ottey. That too is the most for a woman in Athletics, equaled in 2016 by Allyson Felix, who was coached in part by Brisco-Hooks and Griffith's coach, future brother-in-law, Bob Kersee.

== Medalists ==
Gold	Valerie Brisco-Hooks; United States
Silver	Florence Griffith; United States
Bronze	Merlene Ottey-Page; Jamaica

== Abbreviations ==
Q	automatic qualification
q	qualification by rank
DNS	did not start
NM	no mark
OR	olympic record
WR	world record
AR	area record
NR	national record
PB	personal best
SB	season best

== Results ==
=== Heats ===
Qualification rule: First 5 in each heat (Q) and the next 2 fastest (q) advance to the quarterfinals.

Wind:
Heat 1: -2.0 m/s, Heat 2: -0.4 m/s, Heat 3: -1.5 m/s, Heat 4: +0.9 m/s, Heat 5: +2.3 m/s, Heat 6: -0.7 m/s

Rank	Heat	Name	Nationality	Time	Notes
1	1	Florence Griffith	United States	22.56	Q
2	2	Grace Jackson	Jamaica	22.70	Q
3	5	Randy Givens	United States	22.88	Q
4	4	Merlene Ottey-Page	Jamaica	22.90	Q
5	3	Valerie Brisco-Hooks	United States	23.10	Q
6	5	Rose-Aimée Bacoul	France	23.11	Q
7	5	Sandra Whittaker	Great Britain	23.22	Q
8	4	Marisa Masullo	Italy	23.30	Q
9	1	Joan Baptiste	Great Britain	23.31	Q
10	4	Liliane Gaschet	France	23.32	Q
11	2	Pauline Davis	Bahamas	23.37	Q
12	2	Heidi-Elke Gaugel	West Germany	23.37	Q
13	4	Angela Williams	Trinidad and Tobago	23.38	Q
14	5	Ruth Waithera	Kenya	23.42	Q
15	1	Raymonde Naigre	France	23.50	Q
16	3	Els Vader	Netherlands	23.65	Q
17	6	Kathy Cook	Great Britain	23.71	Q
18	5	Janet Burke	Jamaica	23.75	Q
19	6	Helinae Marjamaa	Finland	24.10	Q
20	6	Michaela Schabinger	West Germany	24.12	Q
21	1	Angela Bailey	Canada	24.15	Q
22	1	Semra Aksu	Turkey	24.27	Q
23	2	Ruth Enang Mesode	Cameroon	24.39	Q
24	3	Teresa Rioné	Spain	24.48	Q
25	2	Nzaeli Kyomo	Tanzania	24.68	Q
26	6	Divina Estrela	Dominican Republic	24.72	Q
27	6	Elanga Buala	Papua New Guinea	24.82	Q
28	3	Mo Myeong-hui	South Korea	24.86	Q
29	4	Christa Schumann	Guatemala	24.91	Q
30	6	Françoise Mpika	Republic of the Congo	25.05	q
31	4	Emma Tahapari	Indonesia	25.07	q
32	1	Lydia de Vega	Philippines	25.10	
33	5	Binta Jambane	Mozambique	25.14	
34	3	Amie N'Dow	The Gambia	25.41	Q
35	2	Soraima Martha	Netherlands Antilles	25.56	
36	2	Marie-Ange Wirtz	Seychelles	25.88	
37	1	Miriama Tuisorisori	Fiji	26.82	
	1	Eugenia Osh-Williams	Sierra Leone	DNS	
	2	Marita Payne	Canada	DNS	
	3	Gillian Forde	Trinidad and Tobago	DNS	
	3	Angella Taylor	Canada	DNS	
	4	Mercy Addy	Ghana	DNS	
	5	Grace-Ann Dinkins	Liberia	DNS	
	5	Felicia Candelario	Dominican Republic	DNS	
	6	Debbie Wells	Australia	DNS	

=== Quarterfinals ===
- Held on 1984-08-08

RANK	HEAT 1	TIME
1.	Rose-Aimée Bacoul (FRA)	22.57
2.	Valerie Brisco-Hooks (USA)	22.78
3.	Angela Bailey (CAN)	22.97
4.	Pauline Davis (BAH)	22.97
5.	Sandra Whittaker (GBR)	22.98
6.	Janet Burke (JAM)	23.56
7.	Françoise Mpika (CGO)	24.97
–	Angela Williams (TRI)	DNS

RANK	HEAT 2	TIME
1.	Merlene Ottey-Page (JAM)	22.53
2.	Liliane Gaschet (FRA)	22.87
3.	Kathy Cook (GBR)	23.02
4.	Marisa Masullo (ITA)	23.19
5.	Michaela Schabinger (FRG)	23.84
6.	Mo Myung-hee (KOR)	24.70
7.	Christa Schumann (GUA)	24.90
8.	Nzaeli Kyomo (TAN)	25.11

RANK	HEAT 3	TIME
1.	Grace Jackson (JAM)	22.52
2.	Randy Givens (USA)	22.81
3.	Els Vader (NED)	23.31
4.	Ruth Waithera (KEN)	23.37
5.	Raymonde Naigre (FRA)	23.54
6.	Teresa Rioné (ESP)	23.78
7.	Elanga Buala (PNG)	24.87
8.	Arnie Ndow (GAM)	25.24

RANK	HEAT 4	TIME
1.	Florence Griffith (USA)	22.33
2.	Joan Baptiste (GBR)	23.11
3.	Heidi-Elke Gaugel (FRG)	23.19
4.	Helinae Marjamaa (FIN)	23.51
5.	Semra Aksu (TUR)	24.03
6.	Ruth Enang Mesode (CMR)	24.25
7.	Divina Estrella (DOM)	24.98
–	Emma Tahapari (INA)	DNS

=== Semifinals ===
- Held on 1984-08-09

RANK	HEAT 1	TIME
1.	Florence Griffith (USA)	22.27
2.	Merlene Ottey-Page (JAM)	22.57
3.	Randy Givens (USA)	22.69
4.	Liliane Gaschet (FRA)	22.73
5.	Joan Baptiste (GBR)	22.86
6.	Helinae Marjamaa (FIN)	23.12
7.	Els Vader (NED)	23.43
8.	Ruth Waithera (KEN)	23.45

RANK	HEAT 2	TIME
1.	Valerie Brisco-Hooks (USA)	22.28
2.	Grace Jackson (JAM)	22.32
3.	Kathy Cook (GBR)	22.38
4.	Rose-Aimée Bacoul (FRA)	22.53
5.	Angela Bailey (CAN)	22.75
6.	Marisa Masullo (ITA)	22.88
7.	Heidi-Elke Gaugel (FRG)	23.02
7.	Pauline Davis (BAH)	23.02

=== Final ===
RANK	FINAL	TIME
	Valerie Brisco-Hooks (USA)	21.81 (OR)
	Florence Griffith (USA)	22.04
	Merlene Ottey-Page (JAM)	22.09
4.	Kathy Cook (GBR)	22.10
5.	Grace Jackson (JAM)	22.20
6.	Randy Givens (USA)	22.36
7.	Rose-Aimée Bacoul (FRA)	22.78
8.	Liliane Gaschet (FRA)	22.86

== See also ==
- 1982 Women's European Championships 200 metres (Athens)
- 1983 Women's World Championships 200 metres (Helsinki)
- 1984 Friendship Games 200 metres (Prague)
- 1986 Women's European Championships 200 metres (Stuttgart)
- 1987 Women's World Championships 200 metres (Rome)
