= Athletics at the 1984 Summer Olympics – Women's 4 × 100 metres relay =

Women's 4 × 100 metres relay at the Games of the XXIII Olympiad
- Venue: Los Angeles Memorial Coliseum
- Dates: August 11, 1984 (round 1 & final)
- Competitors: 45 from 11 nations
- Teams: 11
- Winning time: 41.65

Medalists
| 1st place, gold medalist(s) | | Alice Brown, Jeanette Bolden, Chandra Cheeseborough, Evelyn Ashford | United States |
| 2nd place, silver medalist(s) | | Angela Bailey, Marita Payne, Angella Taylor-Issajenko, France Gareau | Canada |
| 3rd place, bronze medalist(s) | | Simmone Jacobs, Kathy Cook, Beverley Callender, Heather Oakes | Great Britain |

These are the official results of the Women's 4 × 100 m Relay event at the 1984 Summer Olympics in Los Angeles, California. A total of 11 teams competed. The final was held on August 11, 1984.

== Records ==
These were the standing World and Olympic records (in seconds) prior to the 1984 Summer Olympics.

| World record | 41.53 | (East Germany) Silke Gladisch (East Germany) Sabine Rieger (East Germany) Ingrid Auerswald (East Germany) Marlies Göhr | Berlin (GDR) | July 31, 1983 |
| Olympic record | 41.60 | (East Germany) Romy Müller (East Germany) Bärbel Wöckel (East Germany) Ingrid Auerswald (East Germany) Marlies Göhr | Moscow (URS) | August 1, 1980 |

== Schedule ==
All times are in Pacific Daylight Time (UTC-7)

The Women's 4 × 100 metres relay took place.

| Date | Time | Round |
|---|---|---|
| Saturday, August 11, 1984 | 10:00 | Round 1 |
| Saturday, August 11, 1984 | 16:20 | Final |

== Results ==
=== Heats ===
Qualification Rules: First 3 in each heat (Q) and the next 2 fastest (q) advance to the Final

==== Heat 1 ====
| Rank | Lane | Nation | Competitors | Reaction | Time | Notes |
|---|---|---|---|---|---|---|
| 1 | 2 | Jamaica | Janet Burke, Grace Jackson, Veronica Findlay, Merlene Ottey | | 43.05 | Q |
| 2 | 3 | Great Britain | Simmone Jacobs, Kathy Cook, Beverley Callender, Heather Oakes | | 43.47 | Q |
| 3 | 5 | France | Rose-Aimée Bacoul, Liliane Gaschet, Marie France Loval, Raymonde Naigre | | 43.64 | Q |
| 4 | 4 | Bahamas | Eldece Clarke, Pauline Davis, Debbie Greene, Oralee Fowler | | 44.15 | q |
| 5 | 6 | Thailand | Ratjai Sripet, Wallapa Tangjitnusom, Jaree Patthaarath, Wassana Panyapuek | | 45.62 | |

==== Heat 2 ====
| Rank | Lane | Nation | Competitors | Reaction | Time | Notes |
|---|---|---|---|---|---|---|
| 1 | 6 | United States | Alice Brown, Jeanette Bolden, Chandra Cheeseborough, Evelyn Ashford | | 42.59 | Q |
| 2 | 4 | Canada | Angela Bailey, Marita Payne, Angella Taylor-Issajenko, France Gareau | | 43.53 | Q |
| 3 | 5 | West Germany | Edith Oker, Michaela Schabinger, Heidi-Elke Gaugel, Ute Thimm | | 44.30 | Q |
| 4 | 3 | Trinidad and Tobago | Janice Bernard, Gillian Forde, Ester Hope-Washington, Angela Williams | | 44.78 | q |
| 5 | 7 | Ghana | Grace Armah, Mary Mensah, Cynthia Quartey, Doris Wiredu | | 45.20 | |
| 6 | 2 | The Gambia | Jabou Jawo, Amie Ndow, Victoria Decka, Georgiana Freeman | | 47.18 | |

=== Final ===
| Rank | Lane | Nation | Competitors | Reaction | Time | Notes |
|---|---|---|---|---|---|---|
| 1st place, gold medalist(s) | 5 | United States | Alice Brown, Jeanette Bolden, Chandra Cheeseborough, Evelyn Ashford | 0.183 | 41.65 | |
| 2nd place, silver medalist(s) | 6 | Canada | Angela Bailey, Marita Payne, Angella Taylor-Issajenko, France Gareau | 0.174 | 42.77 | |
| 3rd place, bronze medalist(s) | 1 | Great Britain | Angela Bailey, Marita Payne, Angella Taylor-Issajenko, France Gareau | 0.187 | 43.11 | |
| 4 | 8 | France | Rose-Aimée Bacoul, Liliane Gaschet, Marie France Loval, Raymonde Naigre | 0.204 | 43.15 | |
| 5 | 7 | West Germany | Edith Oker, Michaela Schabinger, Heidi-Elke Gaugel, Ute Thimm | 0.171 | 43.57 | |
| 6 | 3 | Bahamas | Eldece Clarke, Pauline Davis, Debbie Greene, Oralee Fowler | 0.205 | 44.18 | |
| 7 | 4 | Trinidad and Tobago | Janice Bernard, Gillian Forde, Ester Hope-Washington, Angela Williams | 0.184 | 44.23 | |
| 8 | 2 | Jamaica | Juliet Cuthbert, Grace Jackson, Veronica Findlay, Merlene Ottey | 0.318 | 53.54 | |

== See also ==
- 1982 Women's European Championships 4 × 100 m Relay (Athens)
- 1983 Women's World Championships 4 × 100 m Relay (Helsinki)
- 1987 Women's World Championships 4 × 100 m Relay (Rome)
