= 200 metres at the World Athletics Championships =

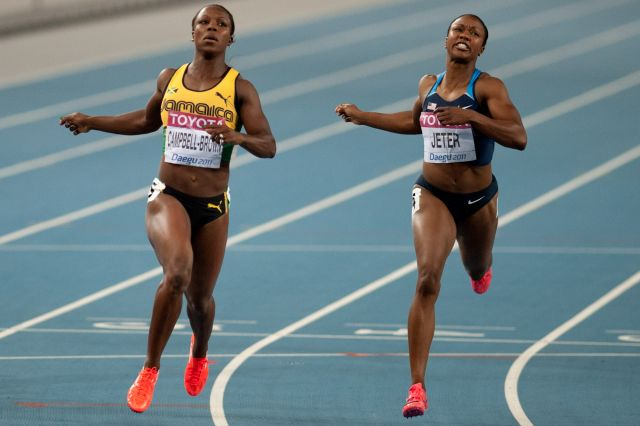
- Veronica Campbell-Brown and Carmelita Jeter in the 2011 final

Overview
- Gender: Men and women
- Years held: Men: 1983 – 2025; Women: 1983 – 2025

Championship record
- Men: 19.19 Usain Bolt (2009)
- Women: 21.41 Shericka Jackson (2023)

Reigning champion
- Men: Noah Lyles (USA)
- Women: Melissa Jefferson-Wooden (USA)

The 200 metres at the World Championships in Athletics has been contested by both men and women since the inaugural edition in 1983. It is the second most prestigious title in the discipline after the 200 metres at the Olympics. The competition format typically has two or three qualifying rounds leading to a final between eight athletes.

The championship records for the event are 19.19 seconds for men, set by Usain Bolt in 2009, and 21.41 seconds for women, set by Shericka Jackson in 2023. The men's world record has been broken at the competition on one occasion, and Bolt's championship record set in 2009 remains the world record as of 2025. The women's world record has never been broken at the competition.

Usain Bolt is the most successful athlete of the event, having won four successive titles from 2009 to 2015, and also a silver in 2007. Allyson Felix is the most successful woman, having won three straight titles (2005 to 2009). Two-time champion Merlene Ottey has won more medals in the 200 m than any other athlete, reaching the podium six times in a period stretching from 1983 to 1997. Calvin Smith and Michael Johnson are the only others to have won two world titles over the distance.

The United States is the most successful nation in the discipline, with twelve gold medals among a total of 31. Jamaica is the next most successful with seventeen medals and seven titles. East Germany and the Netherlands, with two golds, are the only other nations to have provided multiple gold medallists.

== Age records ==
- All information from World Athletics.

Distinction	Male			Female		
Distinction	Athlete	Age	Date	Athlete	Age	Date
Youngest champion	Noah Lyles (USA)	22 years, 75 days	1 Oct 2019	Allyson Felix (USA)	19 years, 267 days	12 Aug 2005
Youngest medalist	Erriyon Knighton (USA)	18 years, 173 days	21 Jul 2022	Allyson Felix (USA)	19 years, 267 days	12 Aug 2005
Youngest finalist	Abdul Hakim Sani Brown (JPN)	18 years, 157 days	10 Aug 2017	Shaunae Miller (BAH)	19 years, 123 days	16 Aug 2013
Youngest participant	Abdul Hakim Sani Brown (JPN)	16 years, 172 days	25 Aug 2015	Fowzio Abdikarim Sheikh (SOM)	15 years, 323 days	29 Aug 2007
Oldest champion	Usain Bolt (JAM)	29 years, 6 days	27 Aug 2015	Merlene Ottey (JAM)	35 years, 92 days	10 Aug 1995
Oldest medalist	Justin Gatlin (USA)	33 years, 198 days	27 Aug 2015	Merlene Ottey (JAM)	37 years, 90 days	8 Aug 1997
Oldest finalist	Frankie Fredericks (NAM)	35 years, 331 days	29 Aug 2003	Merlene Ottey (JAM)	37 years, 90 days	8 Aug 1997
Oldest participant	Troy Douglas (NED)	40 years, 270 days	27 Aug 2003	Merlene Ottey (SLO)	43 years, 108 days	26 Aug 2003

== Doping ==
The first instances of doping bans affecting the 200 m at the World Championships came at the 2001 edition. The champion Marion Jones was stripped of her gold medal and bronze medalist Kelli White met the same fate. Debbie Ferguson, the sole remaining original medalist, was elevated to the gold medal. A third female athlete, Yekaterina Leshchova who ran in the heats, was also disqualified for doping. The first male doping disqualifications happened the same year, with quarter-finalists Christophe Cheval and Ramon Clay being the offenders. Doping persisted at the 2003 World Championships – White was the champion that year and her retrospective ban also affected this result. The 1997 champion Zhanna Block, fourth in 2003, was also disqualified. Anastasiya Kapachinskaya (herself banned for steroids in 2004) was promoted to the position of 2003 world champion.

The next 200 m athlete to be disqualified for doping was Ruqaya Al-Ghasra (a competitor in the heats only). Two positive drug tests were recorded by 200 m athletes at the 2013 World Championships in Athletics: Yelena Ryabova, who ran in the heats, and semi-finalist Yelyzaveta Bryzhina.

== Medalists ==
=== Men ===
Championships	Gold	Silver	Bronze
1983 Helsinki	Calvin Smith (USA)	Elliott Quow (USA)	Pietro Mennea (ITA)
1987 Rome	Calvin Smith (USA)	Gilles Quénéhervé (FRA)	John Regis (GBR)
1991 Tokyo	Michael Johnson (USA)	Frankie Fredericks (NAM)	Atlee Mahorn (CAN)
1993 Stuttgart	Frankie Fredericks (NAM)	John Regis (GBR)	Carl Lewis (USA)
1995 Gothenburg	Michael Johnson (USA)	Frankie Fredericks (NAM)	Jeff Williams (USA)
1997 Athens	Ato Boldon (TRI)	Frankie Fredericks (NAM)	Claudinei da Silva (BRA)
1999 Seville	Maurice Greene (USA)	Claudinei da Silva (BRA)	Francis Obikwelu (NGR)
2001 Edmonton	Konstantinos Kenteris (GRE)	Christopher Williams (JAM)	Kim Collins (SKN); Shawn Crawford (USA)
2003 Saint-Denis	John Capel Jr. (USA)	Darvis Patton (USA)	Shingo Suetsugu (JPN)
2005 Helsinki	Justin Gatlin (USA)	Wallace Spearmon (USA)	John Capel (USA)
2007 Osaka	Tyson Gay (USA)	Usain Bolt (JAM)	Wallace Spearmon (USA)
2009 Berlin	Usain Bolt (JAM)	Alonso Edward (PAN)	Wallace Spearmon (USA)
2011 Daegu	Usain Bolt (JAM)	Walter Dix (USA)	Christophe Lemaitre (FRA)
2013 Moscow	Usain Bolt (JAM)	Warren Weir (JAM)	Curtis Mitchell (USA)
2015 Beijing	Usain Bolt (JAM)	Justin Gatlin (USA)	Anaso Jobodwana (RSA)
2017 London	Ramil Guliyev (TUR)	Wayde van Niekerk (RSA)	Jereem Richards (TTO)
2019 Doha	Noah Lyles (USA)	Andre De Grasse (CAN)	Álex Quiñónez (ECU)
2022 Eugene	Noah Lyles (USA)	Kenny Bednarek (USA)	Erriyon Knighton (USA)
2023 Budapest	Noah Lyles (USA)	Erriyon Knighton (USA)	Letsile Tebogo (BOT)
2025 Tokyo	Noah Lyles (USA)	Kenny Bednarek (USA)	Bryan Levell (JAM)

==== Medalists by country ====
Rank	Nation	Gold	Silver	Bronze	Total
1	United States (USA)	12	8	8	28
2	Jamaica (JAM)	4	3	1	8
3	Namibia (NAM)	1	3	0	4
4	Trinidad and Tobago (TTO)	1	0	1	2
5	Greece (GRE)	1	0	0	1
5	Turkey (TUR)	1	0	0	1
6	Brazil (BRA)	0	1	1	2
6	Canada (CAN)	0	1	1	2
6	France (FRA)	0	1	1	2
6	Great Britain (GBR)	0	1	1	2
6	South Africa (RSA)	0	1	1	2
7	Panama (PAN)	0	1	0	1
8	Botswana (BOT)	0	0	1	1
8	Ecuador (ECU)	0	0	1	1
8	Italy (ITA)	0	0	1	1
8	Japan (JPN)	0	0	1	1
8	Nigeria (NGR)	0	0	1	1
8	Saint Kitts and Nevis (SKN)	0	0	1	1

==== Multiple medalists ====
Rank	Athlete	Nation	Period	Gold	Silver	Bronze	Total
1	Usain Bolt	Jamaica (JAM)	2007–2015	4	1	0	5
2	Noah Lyles	United States (USA)	2019–2025	4	0	0	4
3	Calvin Smith	United States (USA)	1983–1987	2	0	0	2
3	Michael Johnson	United States (USA)	1995–1999	2	0	0	2
5	Frankie Fredericks	Namibia (NAM)	1991–1997	1	3	0	4
6	Justin Gatlin	United States (USA)	2005–2017	1	1	0	2
7	John Capel	United States (USA)	2003–2005	1	0	1	2
8	Kenny Bednarek	United States (USA)	2022-2025	0	2	0	2
9	Wallace Spearmon	United States (USA)	2005–2009	0	1	2	3
10	John Regis	Great Britain (GBR)	1987–1993	0	1	1	2
10	Claudinei da Silva	Brazil (BRA)	1997–1999	0	1	1	2
10	Erriyon Knighton	United States (USA)	2022-2023	0	1	1	2

=== Women ===
Championships	Gold	Silver	Bronze
1983 Helsinki	Marita Koch (GDR)	Merlene Ottey (JAM)	Kathy Smallwood-Cook (GBR)
1987 Rome	Silke Gladisch (GDR)	Florence Griffith-Joyner (USA)	Merlene Ottey (JAM)
1991 Tokyo	Katrin Krabbe (GER)	Gwen Torrence (USA)	Merlene Ottey (JAM)
1993 Stuttgart	Merlene Ottey (JAM)	Gwen Torrence (USA)	Irina Privalova (RUS)
1995 Gothenburg	Merlene Ottey (JAM)	Irina Privalova (RUS)	Galina Malchugina (RUS)
1997 Athens	Zhanna Pintusevich-Block (UKR)	Susanthika Jayasinghe (SRI)	Merlene Ottey (JAM)
1999 Seville	Inger Miller (USA)	Beverly McDonald (JAM)	Merlene Frazer (JAM) Andrea Philipp (GER)
2001 Edmonton	Debbie Ferguson (BAH)	LaTasha Jenkins (USA)	Cydonie Mothersille (CAY)
2003 Saint-Denis	Anastasiya Kapachinskaya (RUS)	Torri Edwards (USA)	Muriel Hurtis (FRA)
2005 Helsinki	Allyson Felix (USA)	Rachelle Boone-Smith (USA)	Christine Arron (FRA)
2007 Osaka	Allyson Felix (USA)	Veronica Campbell (JAM)	Susanthika Jayasinghe (SRI)
2009 Berlin	Allyson Felix (USA)	Veronica Campbell-Brown (JAM)	Debbie Ferguson-McKenzie (BAH)
2011 Daegu	Veronica Campbell-Brown (JAM)	Carmelita Jeter (USA)	Allyson Felix (USA)
2013 Moscow	Shelly-Ann Fraser-Pryce (JAM)	Murielle Ahouré (CIV)	Blessing Okagbare (NGR)
2015 Beijing	Dafne Schippers (NED)	Elaine Thompson-Herah (JAM)	Veronica Campbell-Brown (JAM)
2017 London	Dafne Schippers (NED)	Marie-Josée Ta Lou (CIV)	Shaunae Miller-Uibo (BAH)
2019 Doha	Dina Asher-Smith (GBR)	Brittany Brown (USA)	Mujinga Kambundji (SUI)
2022 Eugene	Shericka Jackson (JAM)	Shelly-Ann Fraser-Pryce (JAM)	Dina Asher-Smith (GBR)
2023 Budapest	Shericka Jackson (JAM)	Gabrielle Thomas (USA)	Sha'Carri Richardson (USA)
2025 Tokyo	Melissa Jefferson-Wooden (USA)	Amy Hunt (GBR)	Shericka Jackson (JAM)

==== Medalists by country ====
Rank	Nation	Gold	Silver	Bronze	Total
1	Jamaica (JAM)	6	6	6	18
2	United States (USA)	5	9	2	16
3	East Germany (GDR)	2	0	0	2
3	Netherlands (NED)	2	0	0	2
5	Russia (RUS)	1	1	2	4
5	Great Britain (GBR)	1	1	2	4
7	Bahamas (BAH)	1	0	2	3
8	Germany (GER)	1	0	1	2
9	Ukraine (UKR)	1	0	0	1
10	Ivory Coast (CIV)	0	2	0	2
11	Sri Lanka (SRI)	0	1	1	2
12	France (FRA)	0	0	2	2
13	Cayman Islands (CAY)	0	0	1	1
13	Switzerland (SUI)	0	0	1	1
13	Nigeria (NGR)	0	0	1	1

==== Multiple medalists ====
Rank	Athlete	Nation	Period	Gold	Silver	Bronze	Total
1	Allyson Felix	United States (USA)	2005–2011	3	0	1	4
2	Merlene Ottey	Jamaica (JAM)	1983–1997	2	1	3	6
3	Shericka Jackson	Jamaica (JAM)	2022-2025	2	0	1	3
4	Dafne Schippers	Netherlands (NED)	2015–2017	2	0	0	2
5	Veronica Campbell-Brown	Jamaica (JAM)	2007–2015	1	2	1	4
6	Shelly-Ann Fraser-Pryce	Jamaica (JAM)	2013–2022	1	1	0	2
7	Debbie Ferguson	Bahamas (BAH)	2001–2009	1	0	1	2
7	Dina Asher-Smith	Great Britain (GBR)	2019–2022	1	0	1	2
9	Gwen Torrence	United States (USA)	1991–1993	0	2	0	2
10	Irina Privalova	Russia (RUS)	1993–1995	0	1	1	2
10	Susanthika Jayasinghe	Sri Lanka (SRI)	1997–2007	0	1	1	2

== Championship record progression ==
=== Men ===
Men's 200 metres World Championships record progression
Time	Athlete	Nation	Year	Round	Date
20.95	Frank Emmelmann	East Germany (GDR)	1983	Heats	1983-08-12
20.80	Pietro Mennea	Italy (ITA)	1983	Heats	1983-08-12
20.76	Carlo Simionato	Italy (ITA)	1983	Heats	1983-08-12
20.75	Carlo Simionato	Italy (ITA)	1983	Quarter-finals	1983-08-12
20.68	Pietro Mennea	Italy (ITA)	1983	Quarter-finals	1983-08-12
20.29	Calvin Smith	United States (USA)	1983	Semi-finals	1983-08-12
20.14	Calvin Smith	United States (USA)	1983	Final	1983-08-12
20.05	Michael Johnson	United States (USA)	1991	Quarter-finals	1991-08-26
20.01	Michael Johnson	United States (USA)	1991	Final	1991-08-27
19.85	Frankie Fredericks	Namibia (NAM)	1993	Final	1993-08-20
19.79	Michael Johnson	United States (USA)	1995	Final	1995-08-11
19.76	Tyson Gay	United States (USA)	2007	Final	2007-08-30
19.19 WR	Usain Bolt	Jamaica (JAM)	2009	Final	2009-08-20

=== Women ===
Women's 200 metres World Championships record progression
Time	Athlete	Nation	Year	Round	Date
23.34	Joan Baptiste	Great Britain (GBR)	1983	Heats	1983-08-12
23.05	Florence Griffith Joyner	United States (USA)	1983	Heats	1983-08-12
23.01	Randy Givens	United States (USA)	1983	Heats	1983-08-12
22.78	Kathy Smallwood-Cook	Great Britain (GBR)	1983	Quarter-finals	1983-08-12
22.38	Merlene Ottey	Jamaica (JAM)	1983	Quarter-finals	1983-08-12
22.13	Marita Koch	East Germany (GDR)	1983	Final	1983-08-14
21.74	Silke Möller	East Germany (GDR)	1987	Final	1987-09-03
21.63	Dafne Schippers	Netherlands (NED)	2015	Final	2015-08-28
21.45	Shericka Jackson	Jamaica (JAM)	2022	Final	2022-07-21
21.41	Shericka Jackson	Jamaica (JAM)	2023	Final	2023-08-25

== Finishing times ==
=== Top ten fastest World Championship times ===
Fastest men's times at the World Championships
Rank	Time (sec)	Athlete	Nation	Games	Date
1	19.19	Usain Bolt	Jamaica	2009	2009-08-20
2	19.31	Noah Lyles	United States	2022	2022-07-21
3	19.40	Usain Bolt	Jamaica	2011	2011-09-03
4	19.51	Noah Lyles	United States	2025^{SF}	2025-09-18
5	19.52	Noah Lyles	United States	2023	2023-08-25
5	19.52	Noah Lyles	United States	2025	2025-09-19
7	19.55	Usain Bolt	Jamaica	2015	2015-08-27
8	19.58	Kenny Bednarek	United States	2025	2025-09-19
9	19.62	Noah Lyles	United States	2022	2022-07-21
10	19.64	Bryan Levell	Jamaica	2025	2025-09-19

Fastest women's times at the World Championships
Rank	Time (sec)	Athlete	Nation	Games	Date
1	21.41	Shericka Jackson	Jamaica	2023	2023-08-25
2	21.45	Shericka Jackson	Jamaica	2022	2022-07-21
3	21.63	Dafne Schippers	Netherlands	2015	2015-08-27
4	21.66	Elaine Thompson	Jamaica	2015	2015-08-27
5	21.67	Shericka Jackson	Jamaica	2022^{SF}	2022-07-19
6	21.68	Melissa Jefferson-Wooden	United States	2025	2025-09-19
7	21.74	Silke Gladisch-Moller	East Germany	1987	1987-09-03
8	21.77	Inger Miller	United States	1999	1999-08-27
9	21.81	Allyson Felix	United States	2007	2007-08-31
9	21.81	Shelly-Ann Fraser-Pryce	Jamaica	2022	2022-07-21
9	21.81	Gabrielle Thomas	United States	2023	2023-08-25

== Bibliography ==
- Butler, Mark (2013). IAAF Statistics Book Moscow 2013 (PDF). IAAF. Archived from the original (PDF) on 12 October 2014.
