= 1983 World Championships in Athletics – Women's 4 × 100 metres relay =

The 4 × 100 metres relay at the 1983 World Championships in Athletics was held in the Helsinki Olympic Stadium on August 10. Although this event was won by the East German team, it is generally accepted that those athletes were part of a programme of performance-enhancing drug usage (doping in East Germany). There are strong calls for the Great Britain team to be awarded the gold medal since they can be considered to have been the real winners, as is often the case involving those who lost out to East German drug cheats in the 1980s.

== Medals ==
Gold:	Silver:	Bronze:
East Germany; Silke Gladisch; Marita Koch; Ingrid Auerswald; Marlies Göhr	Great Britain; Joan Baptiste; Kathy Cook; Beverley Callender; Shirley Thomas	Jamaica; Leleith Hodges; Jacqueline Pusey; Juliet Cuthbert; Merlene Ottey

== Records ==
Existing records at the start of the event.

World record	East Germany (GDR)	41.53	Berlin, Germany	July 31, 1983
Championship record	New event			

== Results ==
=== Heats ===
All times shown are in seconds.

AR area record | CR championship record | GR games record | NR national record | OR Olympic record | PB personal best | SB season best | WL world leading (in a given season)
DNS = did not start | DQ = disqualification | NM = no mark (i.e. no valid result) | Q = qualification by place in heat | q = qualification by overall place

==== Heat 1 ====
1. Great Britain (Joan Baptiste, Kathy Cook, Beverley Callender, Shirley Thomas) 43.06 Q
2. Bulgaria (Ginka Zagorcheva, Anelia Nuneva, Nadezhda Georgieva, Pepa Pavlova) 43.19 Q
3. Soviet Union (Lyudmila Kondratyeva, Yelena Vinogradova, Irina Olkhovnikova, Olga Antonova) 43.51 Q
4. Czechoslovakia (Jarmila Nygrýnová-Strejčková, Štěpánka Sokolová, Radislava Šoborová, Eva Murková) 43.89 Q
5. West Germany (Monika Hirsch, Elke Vollmer, Michaela Schabinger, Ute Thimm) 44.21
6. Italy (Carla Mercurio, Erica Rossi, Daniela Ferrian, Marisa Masullo) 44.46
7. Finland (Sisko Markkanen-Hanhijoki, Helinä Marjamaa, Margareete Honkaharju, Riitta Ketonen) 44.77
8. Denmark (Britt Hansen, Lisbet Nissen-Petersen, Helle Theil, Dorthe A. Rasmussen) 45.04 NR

==== Heat 2 ====
1. East Germany (Silke Gladisch, Marita Koch, Ingrid Auerswald, Marlies Göhr) 42.59 Q
2. Jamaica (Leleith Hodges, Jacqueline Pusey, Juliet Cuthbert, Merlene Ottey) 43.10 Q
3. France (Marie-France Loval, Marie-Christine Cazier-Ballo, Rose-Aimée Bacoul, Liliane Gaschet) 43.52 Q
4. Canada (Angela Bailey, Marita Payne-Wiggins, Tanya Brothers, Molly Killingbeck) 44.19 Q
5. United States (Alice Brown, Diane Williams, Chandra Cheeseborough, Randy Givens) 44.20
6. Bahamas (Shonel Ferguson, Pauline Davis, Whelma Colebrook, Oralee Fowler) 44.76
7. Ghana (Grace Armah, Mercy Addy, Elisabeth Wilson, Mary Mensah) 47.51

=== Final ===
1. East Germany (Silke Gladisch, Marita Koch, Ingrid Auerswald, Marlies Göhr) 41.76
2. Great Britain (Joan Baptiste, Kathy Cook, Beverley Callender, Shirley Thomas) 42.71
3. Jamaica (Leleith Hodges, Jacqueline Pusey, Juliet Cuthbert, Merlene Ottey) 42.73
4. Bulgaria (Ginka Zagorcheva, Anelia Nuneva, Nadezhda Georgieva, Pepa Pavlova) 42.93
5. Canada (Angela Bailey, Marita Payne-Wiggins, Tanya Brothers, Molly Killingbeck) 43.05
6. Soviet Union (Lyudmila Kondratyeva, Yelena Vinogradova, Irina Olkhovnikova, Olga Antonova) 43.22
7. France (Marie-France Loval, Marie-Christine Cazier-Ballo, Rose-Aimée Bacoul, Liliane Gaschet) 43.40
8. Czechoslovakia (Jarmila Nygrýnová-Strejčková, Štěpánka Sokolová, Radislava Šoborová, Eva Murková) 43.78
