= 1983 World Championships in Athletics – Women's 200 metres =

These are the official results of the Women's 200 metres event at the 1983 IAAF World Championships in Helsinki, Finland. There were a total number of 44 participating athletes, with six qualifying heats and the final held on Sunday 1983-08-14.

Out of the blocks, world record holder Marita Koch in lane 6 slowly made up the stagger on Merlene Ottey in lane 7. By the time they hit the straightaway, Koch had two metres on Ottey who was about even with Florence Griffith in lane 1. Down the straightaway, Ottey steadily ate into Koch's lead while the long striding Kathy Cook came from behind to cruise past Griffith. Sensing the challenge from Ottey, Koch started to lean and struggle the last few steps, but realizing she had won she threw her arms up in victory.

== Medalists ==
Gold	Marita Koch; East Germany (GDR)
Silver	Merlene Ottey; Jamaica (JAM)
Bronze	(United Kingdom) Kathy Cook; Great Britain (GBR)

== Records ==
Existing records at the start of the event.

World Record	Marita Koch (GDR)	21.71	Chemnitz, East Germany	June 10, 1979
Championship Record	New event			

== Final ==
RANK	FINAL wind +1.5	TIME
1st place, gold medalist(s)	Marita Koch (GDR)	22.13
2nd place, silver medalist(s)	Merlene Ottey (JAM)	22.19
3rd place, bronze medalist(s)	Kathy Cook (GBR)	22.37
4.	Florence Griffith (USA)	22.46
5.	Grace Jackson (JAM)	22.63
6.	Anelia Nuneva (BUL)	22.68
7.	Angela Bailey (CAN)	22.93
8.	Ewa Kasprzyk (POL)	23.03

== Semifinals ==
- Held on Saturday 1983-08-13

RANK	HEAT 1 wind +2.1	TIME
1.	Florence Griffith (USA)	22.41w
2.	Kathy Cook (GBR)	22.57w
3.	Anelia Nuneva (BUL)	22.62w
4.	Grace Jackson (JAM)	22.76w
5.	Helinä Marjamaa (FIN)	22.86w
6.	Denise Boyd (AUS)	23.26w
7.	Marisa Masullo (ITA)	23.36w
8.	Irina Olkhovnikova (URS)	23.38w

RANK	HEAT 2 wind +0.8	TIME
1.	Marita Koch (GDR)	22.67
2.	Merlene Ottey (JAM)	22.68
3.	Angela Bailey (CAN)	22.82
4.	Ewa Kasprzyk (POL)	23.02
5.	Joan Baptiste (GBR)	23.24
6.	Nadezhda Georgieva (BUL)	23.26
7.	Randy Givens (USA)	23.34
8.	Liliane Gaschet (FRA)	23.37

== Quarterfinals ==
- Held on Friday 1983-08-12

RANK	HEAT 1 wind +1.3	TIME
1.	Grace Jackson (JAM)	23.06
2.	Anelia Nuneva (BUL)	23.22
3.	Denise Boyd (AUS)	23.28
4.	Irina Olkhovnikova (URS)	23.48
5.	Dorthe A. Rasmussen (DEN)	23.61
6.	Ute Thimm (FRG)	23.68
7.	Lydia de Vega (PHI)	24.16
	Mary Mensah (GHA)	DNS

RANK	HEAT 2 wind +1.4	TIME
1.	Kathy Cook (GBR)	22.78
2.	Ewa Kasprzyk (POL)	22.93
3.	Helinä Marjamaa (FIN)	23.11
4.	Nadezhda Georgieva (BUL)	23.14
5.	Marie-Christine Cazier (FRA)	23.30
6.	Štěpánka Sokolová (TCH)	23.75
7.	Margarita Grun (URU)	24.59
8.	Mo Myong-hee (KOR)	24.74

RANK	HEAT 3 wind -0.3	TIME
1.	Merlene Ottey (JAM)	22.38
2.	Florence Griffith (USA)	22.55
3.	Angela Bailey (CAN)	23.25
4.	Marisa Masullo (ITA)	23.58
5.	Sandra Whittaker (GBR)	23.58
6.	Pauline Davis (BAH)	23.64
7.	Rufina Ubah (NGR)	24.72
	Evelyne Farrell (AHO)	DNS

RANK	HEAT 4 wind +1.2	TIME
1.	Marita Koch (GDR)	23.03
2.	Joan Baptiste (GBR)	23.29
3.	Liliane Gaschet (FRA)	23.38
4.	Randy Givens (USA)	23.43
5.	Lena Möller (SWE)	23.56
6.	Yelena Vinogradova (URS)	23.60
7.	Ruperta Charles (ATG)	24.09
	Elanga Buala (PNG)	DNS

== Qualifying heats ==
- Held on Friday 1983-08-12

RANK	HEAT 1 wind +0.0	TIME
1.	Joan Baptiste (GBR)	23.34
2.	Marita Koch (GDR)	23.59
3.	Liliane Gaschet (FRA)	23.60
4.	Lydia de Vega (PHI)	24.45
5.	Felicite Bada (BEN)	26.98
6.	Marjorie Gentle (BIZ)	27.90
7.	Annah Mathunjwa (SWZ)	29.38

RANK	HEAT 2 wind +1.3	TIME
1.	Florence Griffith (USA)	23.05
2.	Marie-Christine Cazier (FRA)	23.55
3.	Angela Bailey (CAN)	23.93
4.	Ruperta Charles (ATG)	24.11
5.	Koumba Kante (GUI)	27.86
6.	Rose Phillips-King (IVB)	28.50
	Amie Ndow (GAM)	DQ

RANK	HEAT 3 wind +2.5	TIME
1.	Kathy Cook (GBR)	23.20w
2.	Marisa Masullo (ITA)	23.37w
3.	Nadezhda Georgieva (BUL)	23.53w
4.	Štěpánka Sokolová (TCH)	23.82w
5.	Rufina Ubah (NGR)	24.12w
6.	Margarita Grun (URU)	24.84w
7.	Sandra Liburd (SKN)	26.13w
8.	Cornelia Baptiste (LCA)	26.29w

RANK	HEAT 4 wind -0.7	TIME
1.	Grace Jackson (JAM)	23.09
2.	Ewa Kasprzyk (POL)	23.21
3.	Anelia Nuneva (BUL)	23.31
4.	Ute Thimm (FRG)	23.56
5.	Sandra Whittaker (GBR)	23.63
6.	Mo Myong-hee (KOR)	24.63
7.	Evelyne Farrell (AHO)	25.52
8.	Florence Gaza (SOL)	30.43

RANK	HEAT 5 wind -1.9	TIME
1.	Merlene Ottey (JAM)	23.23
2.	Irina Olkhovnikova (URS)	23.65
3.	Helinä Marjamaa (FIN)	23.82
4.	Dorthe A. Rasmussen (DEN)	23.84
5.	Lena Moller (SWE)	23.99
6.	Elanga Buala (PNG)	25.59
7.	Judith Nimpaye (BDI)	30.25

RANK	HEAT 6 wind +1.9	TIME
1.	Randy Givens (USA)	23.01
2.	Yelena Vinogradova (URS)	23.37
3.	Denise Boyd (AUS)	23.38
4.	Pauline Davis (BAH)	23.57
5.	Mary Mensah (GHA)	24.91
6.	Marisol García (NCA)	25.92
7.	Marie-Ange Wirtz (SEY)	26.13

== See also ==
- 1980 Women's Olympic 200 metres (Moscow)
- 1982 Women's European Championships 200 metres (Athens)
- 1984 Women's Olympic 200 metres (Los Angeles)
- 1986 Women's European Championships 200 metres (Stuttgart)
- 1987 Women's World Championships 200 metres (Rome)
- 1988 Women's Olympic 200 metres (Seoul)
