= Randy Givens =

American sprinter (born 1962)

Personal information
- Born: March 27, 1962 (age 64) Alexandria, Louisiana, United States

Sport
- Sport: Track and field
Medal record
Representing United States
Pan American Games
Gold medal – first place	1983 Caracas	200 m
Gold medal – first place	1983 Caracas	4 × 100 m relay
Silver medal – second place	1987 Indianapolis	200 m
Universiade
Gold medal – first place	1983 Edmonton	4 × 100 m relay
Silver medal – second place	1983 Edmonton	100 m
Gold medal – first place	1983 Edmonton	200 m

Randy Jenelle Givens (born March 27, 1962) is an American former track and field athlete who competed in sprinting events. She set personal bests of 11.06 seconds for the 100-meter dash and 22.31 seconds for the 200-meter dash. Givens was a 200 m finalist at the 1984 Olympic Games and represented her country at the 1983 World Championships in Athletics. She was the 200 m gold medalist at the 1983 Pan American Games and returned to win a silver medal at the 1987 Pan American Games.

Givens established herself as a college athlete with the Florida State Seminoles and won four sprint titles (two individual, two relay) at the NCAA Women's Championships in 1984. She was also a multiple medalist at the 1983 Summer Universiade, taking 200 m and relay gold medals and a 100 m silver medal.

== Early life and college ==
Born in Alexandria, Louisiana, she grew up in Amityville, New York and attended Amityville Memorial High School. She went on to attend Florida State University from 1980 to 1984 and competed for their Florida State Seminoles collegiate team. The team was very successful during the period which also included Olympic medalist sprinters Marita Payne and Michelle Finn. Givens' first competitions were in the Association for Intercollegiate Athletics for Women (AIAW) conference, which was a women's counterpart to the then-male dominated National Collegiate Athletic Association (NCAA). At the AIAW indoor championships in 1981 she made the 300-meter dash final then won her first title, anchoring the Seminoles to victory in the 4 × 200-meter relay. She repeated that feat in the 4 × 100-meter relay at the AIAW outdoor meet, where she also placed third in the 200-meter dash. The following year she came third in the 300 m indoors and anchored the team to the runner-up spot in the 880 yard relay.

NCAA track competition for women was instituted in 1982 and Givens competed at the NCAA Women's Division I Outdoor Track and Field Championships. There she placed third in the 200 m, seventh in the 100-meter dash, and was a member of both the second-placed 4 × 100-meter and 4 × 400 meter relay teams. This performance helped the Florida State Seminoles track and field team to third place in the college rankings at the championship. She also won the collegiate 100 m at the Penn Relays that season. At the 1983 NCAA Championships she was again third in the 200 m, improved one place to sixth in the 100 m, and claimed both relay titles, resulting in a runner-up team finish for the Seminoles behind the UCLA Bruins.

The peak of her collegiate track career came at the 1984 NCAA Division I Outdoor Track and Field Championships. She achieved a sprint quadruple by winning the 100 m, 200 m, 4 × 100 m relay and mile relay titles. The Florida State women comfortably won their first NCAA title, over twenty points ahead of the Tennessee Volunteers. Givens was that year's Broderick Award (now the Honda Sports Award) winner in the track and field section.

During her time at Florida State she set school records in the 100 m (11.06 seconds) and 200 m (22.31), as well as the indoor 300-yard dash and 300-meter dash. As of 2015, all the latter three times remain the school records for Florida State. She also set five records at the Penn relays, in the 100 m and both relays. She was inducted into the Florida State Athletic Hall of Fame in 1989.

During her post-collegiate career she was a member of the Puma Track Club.

== National and international career ==
Givens was a frequent finalist at the USA Outdoor Track and Field Championships, coming fifth in the 200 m in 1980 and 1981, then reaching her first national podium in 1982 with a third-place finish. At the 1983 USA Championships she ran a lifetime best of 22.31 seconds to place fourth in the 200 m and was also fifth over 100 m. At the 1984 United States Olympic Trials she came third in the 200 m, earning Olympic selection, and was again ranked fifth over 100 m. After missing the 1985 season, she had her highest national placing at the 1986 USA Outdoor Track and Field Championships, taking second place to Pam Marshall. In the last national final of her career, she came eighth over 200 m in 1987.

Givens' international career overlapped with her time at college. She competed at the highest level of student sport at the 1983 Summer Universiade and came away with a gold medal in the 200 m (ahead of schoolmate Marita Payne), becoming the first American to win that title. She was also silver medalist behind Beverly Kinch in the 100 m, and claimed a second gold medal in the 4 × 100 m relay.

After a strong performance at the national championships she was chosen for the inaugural 1983 World Championships in Athletics. Her time of 23.01 seconds to win her heat was briefly the championship record. Givens reached the semi-finals of the 200 metres at the World Championships in Athletics and ranked 13th overall. She was also part of the relay team at the meet, but the American women did not perform to their usual high standard and were eliminated in the first round, one hundredth of a second behind Canada. The 1983 Pan American Games followed shortly after that same month and Givens won the 200 m title, succeeding Evelyn Ashford, and also shared in the 4 × 100 m relay gold medals with Jackie Washington, Alice Jackson and college teammate Brenda Cliette.

A third-place finish at the Olympic Trials earned her the right to compete at the 1984 Los Angeles Olympics. There she steadily improved through the Olympic 200 m rounds and placed sixth in the final with a time of 22.36 seconds – the second-fastest of her career.

After graduating from Florida State, Givens appeared in two further major international competitions. At the 1986 Goodwill Games she came fifth over 200 m and was a 4 × 100 m relay gold medalist alongside Michelle Finn, Diane Williams and Evelyn Ashford. She returned to defend her 200 m title at the 1987 Pan American Games held in Indianapolis, but was beaten into second place by her compatriot Gwen Torrence.

== Personal records ==
- 100-meter dash – 11.06 seconds (1984)
- 200-meter dash – 22.31 seconds (1983)

== National titles ==
- NCAA Women's Division I Outdoor Track and Field Championships
  - 100-meter dash: 1984
  - 200-meter dash: 1984
  - 4 × 100-meter dash: 1983, 1984
  - 4 × 400-meter/mile relay: 1983, 1984

== International competitions ==
Year	Competition	Venue	Position	Event	Notes
1983	Universiade	Edmonton, Canada	2nd	100 m	11.16w
1983	Universiade	Edmonton, Canada	1st	200 m	22.47
1983	Universiade	Edmonton, Canada	1st	4 × 100 m relay	42.82
1983	World Championships	Helsinki, Finland	13th	200 m	23.34
1983	World Championships	Helsinki, Finland	9th	4 × 100 m relay	44.20
1983	Pan American Games	Caracas, Venezuela	1st	200 m	23.14
1983	Pan American Games	Caracas, Venezuela	1st	4 × 100 m relay	43.21
1984	Olympic Games	Los Angeles, United States	6th	200 m	22.36
1986	Goodwill Games	Moscow, Russia	5th	200 m	22.61
1986	Goodwill Games	Moscow, Russia	1st	4 × 100 m relay	42.12
1987	Pan American Games	Indianapolis, United States	2nd	200 m	22.71w
