= Masters W35 100 metres world record progression =

This is the progression of world record improvements of the 100 metres W35 division of Masters athletics.

Key

Incomplete information Wind aided Pending

Hand	Auto	Wind	Athlete	Nationality	Birthdate	Age	Location	Date
	10.62	+0.4	Shelly-Ann Fraser-Pryce	Jamaica	27 December 1986	35 years, 226 days	Monaco	10 August 2022
	10.66	+0.5	Shelly-Ann Fraser-Pryce	Jamaica	27 December 1986	35 years, 222 days	Chorzów	6 August 2022
	10.67	+0.5	Shelly-Ann Fraser-Pryce	Jamaica	27 December 1986	35 years, 173 days	Paris	18 June 2022
	10.67 A	-0.4	Shelly-Ann Fraser-Pryce	Jamaica	27 December 1986	35 years, 131 days	Nairobi	7 May 2022
	10.74	+1.3	Merlene Ottey	Jamaica	10 May 1960	36 years, 120 days	Milan	7 September 1996
	10.85	+1.4	Merlene Ottey	Jamaica	10 May 1960	35 years, 89 days	Gothenburg	7 August 1995
	10.92	+1.9	Merlene Ottey	Jamaica	10 May 1960	35 years, 56 days	Lausanne	5 July 1995
	11.00	+0.8	Merlene Ottey	Jamaica	10 May 1960	35 years, 54 days	Paris	3 July 1995
	11.00	+1.6	Merlene Ottey	Jamaica	10 May 1960	35 years, 26 days	Hengelo	5 June 1995
	11.07	-0.2	Evelyn Ashford	United States	15 April 1957	35 years, 43 days	Jena	28 May 1992
