= Masters W35 200 metres world record progression =

This is the progression of world record improvements of the 200 metres W35 division of Masters athletics.

Key

Incomplete information Wind aided Pending

Hand	Auto	Wind	Athlete	Nationality	Birthdate	Age	Location	Date
	21.81	+0.6	Shelly-Ann Fraser-Pryce	Jamaica	27 December 1986	35 years, 206 days	Eugene	21 July 2022
	21.82	-0.1	Shelly-Ann Fraser-Pryce	Jamaica	27 December 1986	35 years, 204 days	Eugene	19 July 2022
	21.93	1.0	Merlene Ottey	Jamaica	10 May 1960	35 years, 107 days	Brussels	25 August 1995
	22.07	-0.3	Merlene Ottey	Jamaica	10 May 1960	35 years, 100 days	Köln	18 August 1995
	22.07	1.6	Merlene Ottey	Jamaica	10 May 1960	35 years, 56 days	Lausanne	5 July 1995
	22.47	0.7	Evelyn Ashford	United States	15 April 1957	35 years, 120 days	Linz	13 August 1992
	23.45	1.8	Yelena Kelchevskaya	Belarus	7 May 1955	35 years, 19 days	Sochi	26 May 1990
