= Kathy Smallwood-Cook =

British Olympic sprinter

Kathy Cook née Smallwood MBE
Personal information
- Born: 3 May 1960 (age 66) Winchester, Hampshire, England
- Height: 180 cm (5 ft 11 in)
- Weight: 64 kg (141 lb)

Sport
- Sport: Athletics
- Event: Sprints/400m
- Club: Reading AC; Wolverhampton & Bilston AC
Medal record
Women's athletics
Representing Great Britain
Olympic Games
Bronze medal – third place	1980 Moscow	4×100 m relay
Bronze medal – third place	1984 Los Angeles	400 m
Bronze medal – third place	1984 Los Angeles	4×100 m relay
World Championships
Silver medal – second place	1983 Helsinki	4×100 m relay
Bronze medal – third place	1983 Helsinki	200 m
European Championships
Silver medal – second place	1978 Prague	4×100 m relay
Silver medal – second place	1982 Athens	200 m
Silver medal – second place	1982 Athens	4×100 m relay
World Cup
Silver medal – second place	1981 Rome	100 m
World Student Games (Universiade)
Gold medal – first place	1981 Bucharest	200 m
Silver medal – second place	1979 Mexico City	100 m
Silver medal – second place	1979 Mexico City	200 m
Silver medal – second place	1979 Mexico City	4×100 m relay
Silver medal – second place	1981 Bucharest	4×100 m relay
Commonwealth Games
Representing England
Gold medal – first place	1978 Edmonton	4×100 m relay
Gold medal – first place	1982 Brisbane	4×100 m relay
Gold medal – first place	1986 Edinburgh	4×100 m relay
Silver medal – second place	1982 Brisbane	200 m
Silver medal – second place	1986 Edinburgh	200 m
Silver medal – second place	1986 Edinburgh	4×400 m relay
Bronze medal – third place	1986 Edinburgh	400 m

Kathryn Jane Cook MBE (née Smallwood; born 3 May 1960) is a former athlete, specialising in sprint and sprint relays. She is one of the most successful female sprinters in British athletics history. She is three-times an Olympic bronze medallist, including at 400 metres in Los Angeles 1984. Her other individual achievements include winning the 200m at the 1981 Universiade, finishing second in the 100m at the 1981 World Cup, and winning a bronze medal in the 200m at the 1983 World Championships. She is also three-times a winner of the British Athletics Writers' Association Female Athlete of the Year Award (1980–82). Cook held the UK National records for 100m, 200m and 400m for over 25 years.

== Biography ==
Smallwood was born in Winchester, Hampshire, and attended the Hurst Community School, Baughurst and later Queen Mary's College, Basingstoke. She was a member of the Reading Athletic Club and later the Wolverhampton & Bilston Athletics Club.

Smallwood's first major competition was the 1977 European Junior Championships in Donetsk, where she won three medals, bronze in the 100 & 200 metres and a silver in the sprint relay.

In 1978, she competed at the Commonwealth Games in Edmonton and the European Championships in Prague. In Edmonton, representing England, she finished fifth in the 200 metres final in 22.95, narrowly missing a medal, before winning gold in the 4 × 100 m relay with Sharon Colyear, Beverley Goddard and Sonia Lannaman. In Prague, representing Great Britain, the same quartet won a silver medal in the sprint relay. Additionally Smallwood became both the British 100 metres champion and British 200 metres champion after winning the British WAAA Championships titles at the 1978 WAAA Championships.

In 1979, at the World Student Games (Universiade) she won three silver medals. In the 100 metres she finished second behind Marlies Gohr in 11.27, while in the 200 metres she was second to another East German great, Marita Koch, in a PB of 22.70. She also won a silver medal in the 4 × 100 m relay. She also retained her 200 metres WAAA title at the 1979 WAAA Championships.

Smallwood competed at her first Olympics Games in 1980 in Moscow, representing Great Britain, reaching the finals of both the 100 and 200 metres. In the 100 metres, she was sixth in 11.28 secs, while in the 200 metres, she finished fifth in 22.61. She then teamed up with Heather Hunte, who had also reached the 100 metres final and Beverley Goddard and Sonia Lannaman, who had both also reached the 200 metres final, to win the bronze medal in the 4 × 100 m relay, in a UK record time of 42.43, a record that stood until 2014. Only one week after the Olympics, she broke the UK record for the 200 metres, with 22.31 in London. She topped off 1980 by winning both the 100 and 200 at the 1980 WAAA Championships.

Smallwood won her biggest individual title in 1981, winning the 200 metres at the World Student Games in Bucharest, in 22.78 secs. She also won a silver medal in the 4 x 100 relay. Later that year, at the IAAF World Cup, she came in as a late replacement for Sweden's Linda Haglund, to run for Europe in the 100 metres. She finished second to Evelyn Ashford in a UK record time of 11.10, defeating Marlies Gohr, who was third. This would stand as the UK record for 27 years, until Montell Douglas ran 11.05 in 2008. Also in 1981, Smallwood had her first attempt at the 400 m distance. At a meeting in London, she finished second to the world number one that year, Jarmila Kratochvilova, running 51.08.

In July 1982, Smallwood won the 200 WAAA title at the 1982 WAAA Championships and one month later, at the European Championships in Athens, Smallwood broke her own UK 200 m record with 22.13 secs, to finish a close second to Olympic Champion Bärbel Wöckel, who ran 22.04. She won another silver in the sprint relay, along with Wendy Hoyte, Bev Callender (Goddard) and Shirley Thomas. In September, she added the UK 400 m record to her 100 & 200 m records, running 50.46 in London. Then in October, at the Commonwealth Games in Brisbane, she won another silver medal in the 200 metres, in a wind assisted 22.21, being edged out of victory by Jamaica'a Merlene Ottey, who ran 22.19. She did win a gold medal in the sprint relay with Hoyte, Callender and Sonia Lannamann.

In 1983, now competing as Kathy Cook, following her marriage to fellow athlete Garry Cook, she won two medals at the inaugural World Championships in Helsinki. On day one of the championships, she won a silver medal in the sprint relay, alongside Joan Baptiste, Bev Callender and Shirley Thomas. She then won the bronze medal in the 200 metres in 22.37, behind Marita Koch and Merlene Ottey and ahead of Florence Griffith. Cook also won the 1983 WAAA Championships 100 metres title.

In 1984, probably Cook's finest season, she won a further two bronze medals at the Los Angeles Olympics. In the 400 metres, she smashed the UK and Commonwealth record with 49.43 secs, behind the American pair of Valerie Brisco-Hooks and Chandra Cheeseborough. This would remain the UK record for almost 30 years, until Christine Ohuruogu ran 49.41 to win at the 2013 World Championships. Cook then narrowly missed winning a medal in the 200 metres final, where she improved her own national record to 22.10. With a strong late surge, she closed rapidly on Florence Griffith and Merlene Ottey-Page, who won silver and bronze in 22.04 and 22.09 respectively. The race was won by 400m champion, Valerie Brisco-Hooks. Cook's 22.10, stood as the UK record for over 30 years, until Dina Asher-Smith ran 22.07 for fifth at the 2015 World Championships. In the sprint relay, drawn in lane one, she collected another bronze medal, along with Simmone Jacobs and two of her Moscow teammates, Bev Callender (Goddard) and Heather Oakes (Hunte). They ran 43.11 At the end of the 1984 season, Cook ranked 10th on the world all-time lists for both the 200m and 400m and would remain in the all-time top ten until 1986 (200) and 1988 (400). Cook won both the 100 and 200 titles at the 1984 WAAA Championships.

Shortly after the Los Angeles Olympics, Cook won in London over 300 metres, edging out Chandra Cheeseborough. Both were given the time of 35.46 secs, which broke the world best for the rarely contested distance. The mark would remain a world outdoor best until 2003, when Ana Guevara ran 35.30, although it is worth noting that Marita Koch ran a sub 35 sec 300 m split, on her way to her 47.60 world 400 m record in 1985. 1984 would prove to be the peak of Cook's career.

In 1985, her 200 metres season's best was 22.87 for fifth in the European Cup, while in 1986, she failed to run below 23 seconds. She did still manage to win four medals at that years Commonwealth Games in Edinburgh. She won bronze in the 400 metres, behind Australia's Debbie Flintoff and Jillian Richardson of Canada, silver in the 200 metres, behind Canadian Angella Issajenko, gold in the 4 × 100 m relay, with Paula Dunn, Joan Baptiste and Heather Oakes and ended the games with a silver medal in the 4 × 400 metres relay, with Jane Parry, Linda Keough and Angela Piggford.

The Great Britain and England Women's 4 × 100 m relay teams won a medal at eight consecutive Olympic (1980, 1984), World (1983), European (1978, 1982), and Commonwealth Championships (1978, 1982, 1986). Cook was the only woman to be a member of every squad. The run ended at the 1986 Europeans, when the British quartet (again, including Cook) was fifth. She always ran the second 'leg', her rangy gait (she is 5'11' tall) and speed endurance being ideal for this position. She also occasionally competed in the 4 × 400 metres relay. She won a total of sixteen senior national titles during her career.

In the 1986 New Year Honours, Cook was appointed Member of the Order of the British Empire (MBE) for services to athletics.

Cook remains the only British athlete (male or female) to have reached Olympic finals at 100 metres, 200 metres and 400 metres. Her accomplishments are all the more significant because many of her rivals after the fall of the "Iron Curtain" were found to have been performing illegally. She retired in 1987, after competing at the UK Championships.

== Later career ==
Cook worked as a PE teacher at Mayfield Preparatory School, in Walsall. Married since 1982 to Garry Cook, they have three children, a daughter and two sons.

In 2011, she was inducted into the England Athletics Hall of Fame. She received an Honorary Doctorate from the University of Wolverhampton in 2013.

== Personal bests ==
- 100 metres – 11.10 secs Rome 5 September 1981 (Former UK record 1981–2008) ran a wind-assisted 11.08 (25 August 1984 Zurich)
- 200 metres – 22.10 Los Angeles 9 August 1984 (UK record Aug 1984- Aug 2015)
- 300 metres – 35.46 London (Crystal Palace) 18 August 1984 (UK record, former World Best 1984–2003)
- 400 metres – 49.43 Los Angeles 6 August 1984 (Former UK record 1984–2013)
- 4 × 100 metres relay – 42.43 Moscow 1 August 1980 (Former UK record 1980–2014, with Heather Hunte, Beverley Goddard and Sonia Lannaman)

== National titles ==
- 11 AAAs National titles:
  - 4 Times 100 m Champion 1978, 80, 83, 84 ( 2nd in 79, 85 )
  - 6 Times 200 m Champion 1978, 79, 80, 82, 84, 85
  - 400 m Champion 1986
- 5 UK National titles:
  - 100 m Champion 1983 ( 3rd in 79, 80 )
  - 4 Times 200 m Champion 1980, 83, 85, 86 ( 2nd in 79, 3rd in 77, 78 )

== International competitions ==
Year	Competition	Venue	Position	Event	Notes
Representing England
1978	Commonwealth Games	(Canada) Edmonton	5th	200 m	22.96
1978	Commonwealth Games	(Canada) Edmonton	1st	4 × 100 m	43.70
1982	Commonwealth Games	(Australia) Brisbane	2nd	200 m	22.21w
1982	Commonwealth Games	(Australia) Brisbane	1st	4 × 100 m	43.15
1982	Commonwealth Games	(Australia) Brisbane	4th	4 × 400 m	3:35.35
1986	Commonwealth Games	(Scotland) Edinburgh	2nd	200 m	23.18
1986	Commonwealth Games	(Scotland) Edinburgh	3rd	400 m	51.88
1986	Commonwealth Games	(Scotland) Edinburgh	1st	4 × 100 m	43.39
1986	Commonwealth Games	(Scotland) Edinburgh	2nd	4 × 400 m	3:32.82
Representing Great Britain
1977	European Junior Championships	(Soviet Union) Donetsk	3rd	100 m	11.71
1977	European Junior Championships	(Soviet Union) Donetsk	3rd	200 m	23.53
1977	European Junior Championships	(Soviet Union) Donetsk	3rd	4 × 100 m	44.71
1978	European Championships	(Czechoslovakia) Prague	9th (sf)	200 m	23.12
1978	European Championships	(Czechoslovakia) Prague	2nd	4 × 100 m	42.72
1979	European Cup	(Italy) Turin	4th	200 m	22.84
1979	European Cup	(Italy) Turin	3rd	4 × 100 m	43.18
1979	World Student Games	Mexico City	2nd	100 m	11.27
1979	World Student Games	Mexico City	2nd	200 m	22.70
1979	World Student Games	Mexico City	2nd	4 × 100 m	43.26
1980	Olympic Games	(Soviet Union) Moscow	6th	100m	11.28
1980	Olympic Games	(Soviet Union) Moscow	5th	200 m	22.61
1980	Olympic Games	(Soviet Union) Moscow	3rd	4 × 100 m	42.43
1981	World Student Games	(Romania) Bucharest	1st	200 m	22.78
1981	World Student Games	(Romania) Bucharest	2nd	4 × 100 m	43.86
1981	European Cup	(Socialist Federal Republic of Yugoslavia) Zagreb	2nd	100 m	11.27
1981	European Cup	(Socialist Federal Republic of Yugoslavia) Zagreb	2nd	200 m	22.65
1981	European Cup	(Socialist Federal Republic of Yugoslavia) Zagreb	2nd	4 × 100 m	43.03
1981	World Cup	(Italy) Rome	2nd	100 m	11.10
1981	World Cup	(Italy) Rome	DNF	4 × 100 m	—
1982	European Championships	(Greece) Athens	2nd	200 m	22.13
1982	European Championships	(Greece) Athens	2nd	4 × 100 m	42.66
1982	European Championships	(Greece) Athens	5th	4 × 400 m	3:25.82
1983	World Championships	(Finland) Helsinki	3rd	200 m	22.37 (wind 1.5)
1983	World Championships	(Finland) Helsinki	2nd	4 × 100 m	42.71
1983	European Cup	(United Kingdom) London	3rd	200 m	22.57
1983	European Cup	(United Kingdom) London	2nd	4 × 100 m	43.18
1983	European Cup	(United Kingdom) London	5th	4 × 400 m	3:27.29
1984	Olympic Games	(United States) Los Angeles	4th	200 m	22.10
1984	Olympic Games	(United States) Los Angeles	3rd	400 m	49.43
1984	Olympic Games	(United States) Los Angeles	3rd	4 × 100 m	43.11
1985	European Cup	(Soviet Union) Moscow	5th	200 m	22.87
1985	European Cup	(Soviet Union) Moscow	7th	4 × 400 m	3:32.23
1986	European Championships	(West Germany) Stuttgart	10th (sf)	200 m	23.20
1986	European Championships	(West Germany) Stuttgart	5th	4 × 100 m	43.44
Results with (sf) indicate overall position in semifinal round

- At the 1981 World Cup, Smallwood-Cook was representing Europe.
- The 1983 European Cup was held one week after the World Championships.
