= Athletics at the 1984 Summer Olympics – Women's 100 metres =

Women's 100 metres at the Games of the XXIII Olympiad
- Venue: Los Angeles Memorial Coliseum
- Date: 4 August 1984 (heats, quarter-finals); 5 August 1984 (semi-final, final)
- Competitors: 46 from 33 nations
- Winning time: 10.97 OR

Medalists
1st place, gold medalist(s)		Evelyn Ashford; United States
2nd place, silver medalist(s)		Alice Brown; United States
3rd place, bronze medalist(s)		Merlene Ottey-Page; Jamaica

The women's 100 metres was an event at the 1984 Summer Olympics in Los Angeles, California. The final was held on August 5, 1984.

== Results ==
=== Heats ===
The heats were held on 1984-08-04.

==== Heat 1 ====
Rank	Athlete	Nation	Time	Notes
1	Jeanette Bolden	United States	11.25	Q
2	Rose-Aimée Bacoul	France	11.36	Q
3	Els Vader	Netherlands	11.43	Q
4	Gillian Forde	Trinidad and Tobago	11.76	Q
5	Ruth Enang Mesode	Cameroon	11.81	Q
6	Semra Aksu	Turkey	11.86	
7	Barbara Ingiro	Papua New Guinea	12.19	
8	Eugenia Osho-Williams	Sierra Leone	12.57	

==== Heat 2 ====
Rank	Athlete	Nation	Time	Notes
1	Pauline Davis	Bahamas	11.51	Q
2	Juliet Cuthbert	Jamaica	11.83	Q
3	Christa Schumann-Lottmann	Guatemala	12.04	Q
4	Françoise M'Pika	Republic of the Congo	12.54	Q
5	Binta Jambane	Mozambique	12.55	Q
6	Miriama Tuisorisori-Chambault	Fiji	13.04	

==== Heat 3 ====
Rank	Athlete	Nation	Time	Notes
1	Evelyn Ashford	United States	11.06	Q
2	Grace Jackson	Jamaica	11.24	Q
3	Heather Oakes	Great Britain	11.32	Q
4	Teresa Rioné	Spain	11.55	Q
5	France Gareau	Canada	11.66	Q
6	Doris Wiredu	Ghana	11.85	q
7	Jabou Jawo	The Gambia	12.10	NR
8	Walapa Tangjitsusorn	Thailand	12.18	

==== Heat 4 ====
Rank	Athlete	Nation	Time	Notes
1	Alice Brown	United States	11.15	Q
2	Liliane Gaschet	France	11.42	Q
3	Angela Bailey	Canada	11.56	Q
4	Esmeralda de Jesus Garcia	Brazil	11.63	Q
5	Cécile Ngambi	Cameroon	11.67	Q
6	Evelyn Farrell	Netherlands Antilles	11.94	
7	Lee Young-sook	South Korea	12.06	
8	Divina Estrella	Dominican Republic	12.25	

==== Heat 5 ====
Rank	Athlete	Nation	Time	Notes
1	Angella Taylor	Canada	11.23	Q
2	Helinä Marjamaa	Finland	11.43	Q
3	Shirley Thomas	Great Britain	11.91	Q
4	Felicia Candelario	Dominican Republic	12.12	Q
5	Nzaeli Kyomo	Tanzania	12.26	Q
6	Maya Bentzur	Israel	12.30	
7	Grace Ann Dinkins	Liberia	12.35	
8	Gisèle Ongollo	Gabon	12.40	

==== Heat 6 ====
Rank	Athlete	Nation	Time	Notes
1	Merlene Ottey-Page	Jamaica	11.26	Q
2	Heidi-Elke Gaugel	West Germany	11.38	Q
3	Marie-France Loval	France	11.51	Q
4	Eldece Clarke	Bahamas	11.61	Q
5	Angela Williams	Trinidad and Tobago	11.74	Q
6	Lydia de Vega	Philippines	11.85	q
7	Ruperta Charles	Antigua and Barbuda	12.04	
8	Marie-Ange Wirtz	Seychelles	12.61	

=== Quarterfinals ===
The quarterfinals were held on 1984-08-04.

==== Quarterfinal 1 ====
Rank	Athlete	Nation	Time	Notes
1	Evelyn Ashford	United States	11.21	Q
2	Angela Bailey	Canada	11.47	Q
3	Heidi-Elke Gaugel	West Germany	11.50	Q
4	Liliane Gaschet	France	11.51	Q
5	Els Vader	Netherlands	11.56	
6	Angela Williams	Trinidad and Tobago	11.89	
7	Doris Wiredu	Ghana	12.00	
8	Binta Jambane	Mozambique	12.57	

==== Quarterfinal 2 ====
Rank	Athlete	Nation	Time	Notes
1	Merlene Ottey-Page	Jamaica	11.21	Q
2	Rose-Aimée Bacoul	France	11.37	Q
3	Angella Taylor	Canada	11.42	Q
4	Cécile Ngambi	Cameroon	11.82	Q
5	Gillian Forde	Trinidad and Tobago	11.86	
6	Lydia de Vega	Philippines	11.97	
7	Shirley Thomas	Great Britain	12.13	
8	Francoise Mpika	Republic of the Congo	12.60	

==== Quarterfinal 3 ====
Rank	Athlete	Nation	Time	Notes
1	Alice Brown	United States	11.35	Q
2	Helinae Marjamaa	Finland	11.51	Q
3	Heather Oakes	Great Britain	11.54	Q
4	Juliet Cuthbert	Jamaica	11.71	Q
5	Eldece Clarke	Bahamas	11.85	
6	France Gareau	Canada	11.88	
7	Christa Schumann-Lottman	Guatemala	12.23	
–	Felicia Candelario	Dominican Republic	DNS	

==== Quarterfinal 4 ====
Rank	Athlete	Nation	Time	Notes
1	Grace Jackson	Jamaica	11.38	Q
2	Jeanette Bolden	United States	11.42	Q
3	Marie-France Loval	France	11.56	Q
4	Pauline Davis	Bahamas	11.61	Q
5	Teresa Rione	Spain	11.76	
6	Esmeralda de Jesus Garcia	Brazil	11.82	
7	Ruth Enang Mesode	Cameroon	12.02	
8	Nzaeli Kyomo	Tanzania	12.53	

=== Semifinals ===
The semifinals were held on 1984-08-05.

==== Semifinal 1 ====
Rank	Athlete	Nation	Time	Notes
1	Evelyn Ashford	United States	11.03	Q
2	Merlene Ottey-Page	Jamaica	11.17	Q
3	Grace Jackson	Jamaica	11.27	Q
4	Angella Taylor	Canada	11.36	Q
5	Helinae Marjamaa	Finland	11.37	
6	Marie-France Loval	France	11.64	
7	Liliane Gaschet	France	11.68	
8	Cécile Ngambi	Cameroon	11.91	

==== Semifinal 2 ====
Rank	Athlete	Nation	Time	Notes
1	Alice Brown	United States	11.31	Q
2	Jeanette Bolden	United States	11.48	Q
3	Angela Bailey	Canada	11.54	Q
4	Heather Oakes	Great Britain	11.57	Q
5	Rose-Aimée Bacoul	France	11.58	
6	Heidi-Elke Gaugel	West Germany	11.62	
7	Pauline Davis	Bahamas	11.70	
8	Juliet Cuthbert	Jamaica	11.80	

=== Final ===
Rank	Athlete	Nation	Time	Notes
1st place, gold medalist(s)	Evelyn Ashford	United States	10.97	OR
2nd place, silver medalist(s)	Alice Brown	United States	11.13	
3rd place, bronze medalist(s)	Merlene Ottey-Page	Jamaica	11.16	
4	Jeanette Bolden	United States	11.25	
5	Grace Jackson	Jamaica	11.39	
6	Angela Bailey	Canada	11.40	
7	Heather Oakes	Great Britain	11.43	
8	Angella Taylor	Canada	11.62	

== See also ==
- 1983 Women's World Championships 100 metres (Helsinki)
- 1984 Friendship Games 100 metres (Prague)
- 1986 Women's European Championships 100 metres (Stuttgart)
