= 1987 World Championships in Athletics – Women's 200 metres =

These are the official results of the Women's 200 metres event at the 1987 IAAF World Championships in Rome, Italy. There were a total number of 31 participating athletes, with four qualifying heats and the final held on Thursday 1987-09-03.

== Results ==
=== Final ===
Thursday, 3 September 1987 Wind: +1.2

Rank	Name	Result	Notes
Gold medal	Silke Gladisch (GDR)	21.74	CR
Silver medal	Florence Griffith (USA)	21.96	
Bronze medal	Merlene Ottey (JAM)	22.06	
4	Pam Marshall (USA)	22.18	
5	Gwen Torrence (USA)	22.40	
6	Mary Onyali (NGR)	22.52	
7	Ewa Kasprzyk (POL)	22.52	
8	Nadezhda Georgieva (BUL)	22.55	

=== Semifinals ===
Thursday, 3 September 1987 Wind: Heat 1: -1.0 Heat 2: -1.9

Rank	Heat	Name	Result	Notes
1	2	Florence Griffith (USA)	22.38	Q
2	1	Merlene Ottey (JAM)	22.43	Q
3	1	Silke Gladisch (GDR)	22.54	Q
3	2	Mary Onyali (NGR)	22.54	Q
5	2	Ewa Kasprzyk (POL)	22.60	Q
6	2	Gwen Torrence (USA)	22.61	Q
7	1	Pam Marshall (USA)	22.67	Q
8	1	Nadezhda Georgieva (BUL)	22.72	Q
9	1	Pauline Davis (BAH)	22.89	
9	2	Marie-Christine Cazier (FRA)	22.89	
11	2	Maya Azarashvili (URS)	22.91	
12	1	Angela Bailey (CAN)	22.97	
13	2	Ulrike Sarvari (FRG)	23.04	
14	2	Heike Morgenstern (GDR)	23.06	
15	1	Vineta Ikauniece (URS)	23.25	
16	1	Falilat Ogunkoya (NGR)	23.71	

=== Heats ===
Tuesday, 1 September 1987 Wind: Heat 1: -3.4 Heat 2: -0.6 Heat 3: -2.6 Heat 4: -0.6

Rank	Heat	Name	Result	Notes
1	1	Silke Gladisch (GDR)	22.44	Q
2	4	Florence Griffith (USA)	22.56	Q
3	1	Gwen Torrence (USA)	22.61	Q
4	2	Nadezhda Georgieva (BUL)	22.77	Q
5	2	Pam Marshall (USA)	22.84	Q
6	3	Mary Onyali (NGR)	22.87	Q
7	1	Angela Bailey (CAN)	22.94	Q
7	4	Maya Azarashvili (URS)	22.94	Q
9	2	Vineta Ikauniece (URS)	22.98	Q
9	3	Ewa Kasprzyk (POL)	22.98	Q
11	2	Ulrike Sarvari (FRG)	23.02	q
12	2	Heike Morgenstern (GDR)	23.04	q
13	3	Pauline Davis (BAH)	23.08	Q
14	1	Falilat Ogunkoya (NGR)	23.12	q
14	3	Marie-Christine Cazier (FRA)	23.12	q
16	4	Merlene Ottey (JAM)	23.19	Q
17	1	Natalya German (URS)	23.26	
18	3	Silke-Beate Knoll (FRG)	23.40	
19	4	Ingrid Verbruggen (BEL)	23.77	
20	2	Claudia Acerenza (URU)	24.24	
21	4	Amparo Caicedo (COL)	24.30	
22	1	Zoila Stewart (CRC)	24.75	
23	2	Sheila Vyapouri (MRI)	25.32	
24	1	Jabou Jawo (GAM)	25.50	
25	4	Guilhermina da Cruz (ANG)	25.74	
26	1	Elizabeth Arteaga (BOL)	26.11	
27	3	Aminata Diarra (MLI)	26.46	
28	3	Denise Ouabangui (CAF)	28.37	
29	2	Hanaa Ali Ahmed (YEM)	29.00	
–	3	Blanca Lacambra (ESP)	DNS	
–	4	Angella Issajenko (CAN)	DNS	

== See also ==
- 1983 Women's World Championships 200 metres (Helsinki)
- 1984 Women's Olympic 200 metres (Los Angeles)
- 1986 Women's European Championships 200 metres (Stuttgart)
- 1988 Women's Olympic 200 metres (Seoul)
- 1990 Women's European Championships 200 metres (Split)
- 1991 Women's World Championships 200 metres (Tokyo)
- 1992 Women's Olympic 200 metres (Barcelona)
