= Masters W45 100 metres world record progression =

This is the progression of world record improvements of the 100 metres W45 division of Masters athletics.

Key

Incomplete information Wind aided Pending

Hand	Auto	Wind	Athlete	Nationality	Birthdate	Location	Date
	11.34	1.8	Merlene Ottey	Slovenia	10.05.1960	Glasgow	12.08.2006
	11.41	1.0	Merlene Ottey	Slovenia	10.05.1960	Gothenburg	09.08.2006
	11.44	1.2	Merlene Ottey	Slovenia	10.05.1960	Gothenburg	09.08.2006
	11.45	1.3	Merlene Ottey	Slovenia	10.05.1960	Maribor	19.07.2006
	11.84	-0.2	Merlene Ottey	Slovenia	10.05.1960	Cuxhaven	08.07.2006
	11.95	-3.5	Merlene Ottey	Slovenia	10.05.1960	Madrid	09.06.2006
	12.25	1.0	Karin von Riewel	Germany	09.12.1948	Hagen	06.07.1996
	12.30		Phil Raschker	United States	21.02.1947	Atlanta	11.06.1994
	12.45		Maeve Kyle	Ireland	06.10.1928		21.01.1974
