= Grace Jackson =

Jamaican sprinter (born 1961)

Personal information
- Born: 14 June 1961 (age 65) Saint Ann Parish, Jamaica

Sport
- Sport: Track and field
Medal record
Representing Jamaica
Olympic Games
Silver medal – second place	1988 Seoul	200 metres
World Indoor Championships
Silver medal – second place	1989 Budapest	200 metres
Bronze medal – third place	1987 Indianapolis	200 metres
Commonwealth Games
Bronze medal – third place	1982 Brisbane	4x100 metre relay
Summer Universiade
Gold medal – first place	1985 Kobe	200 metres
Bronze medal – third place	1983 Edmonton	200 metres
Bronze medal – third place	1985 Kobe	100 metres
Central American and Caribbean Games
Silver medal – second place	1978 Medellin	High jump

Grace Jackson (born 14 June 1961) is a Jamaican former athlete who competed mainly in the 100 and 200 metres. She won an Olympic silver medal in the 200 metres at the 1988 Seoul Olympics, and is a former Jamaican record-holder in the 200m and 400m. She was Jamaican Sportswoman of the Year in 1986 and 1988.

== Career ==
Born in Saint Ann Parish, Jamaica, West Indies Federation, Jackson reached the 100m and 200m finals in the 1984 Summer Olympics, finishing fifth in both. A year later, she won the 200m title at the 1985 Summer Universiade and finished second in the 100m and 200m at the 1985 IAAF World Cup. She won a bronze medal in the 200m at the 1987 IAAF World Indoor Championships behind Heike Drechsler and Merlene Ottey.

The highlight of her career was at the 1988 Summer Olympics, where she won a silver medal in the 200m behind Florence Griffith-Joyner's still-standing world record of 21.34. Jackson ran a Jamaican record time of 21.72 seconds that was .01 seconds short of the pre-Olympic world record Griffith-Joyner broke. In the process, she finished ahead of then-200m World Champion Silke Moller (5th), Heike Drechsler (3rd) and teammate Merlene Ottey (4th). Ottey would regain the Jamaican record in 1990. She won a silver medal in the 200m at the 1989 IAAF World Indoor Championships behind Ottey. Later that year she broke the Jamaican 400m record with a time of 49.57 seconds, which would stand as the national record for 13 years. In November 1990, she married Hugh Small.

Jackson concluded her international career by finishing sixth in the 200m final at the 1992 Summer Olympics.

== Achievements ==
Personal Bests:

- 100 metres – 11.08sec (1988) – also ran 10.97 wind-assisted (+3.0) in 1988
- 200 metres – 21.72sec (1988) – stood as Jamaican Record from 1988 to 1990
- 400 metres – 49.57sec (1988) – stood as Jamaican Record from 1989 to 2002
- Jamaican Sportswoman of the Year in 1986 and 1988

Year	Competition	Venue	Position	Event	Notes
Representing Jamaica
1976	CARIFTA Games (U-20)	Nassau, Bahamas	2nd	High jump	1.65 m
1978	CARIFTA Games (U-20)	Nassau, Bahamas	3rd	100 m hurdles	16.56
1978	Central American and Caribbean Games	Medellín, Colombia	2nd	High jump	1.70 m
1978	Central American and Caribbean Junior Championships (U-20)	Xalapa, Mexico	1st	High jump	1.65 m A
1982	Commonwealth Games	Brisbane, Australia	7th	200 m	23.25
1982	Commonwealth Games	Brisbane, Australia	3rd	4 × 100 m	43.69
1983	World Championships	Helsinki, Finland	5th	200 m	22.63 (wind 1.5)
1983	World Championships	Helsinki, Finland	heats	4 × 400 m	3:34.17
1984	Olympic Games	Los Angeles, United States	5th	100 m	11.39
1984	Olympic Games	Los Angeles, United States	5th	200 m	22.20
1984	Olympic Games	Los Angeles, United States	8th	4 × 100 m	53.54
1984	Olympic Games	Los Angeles, United States	5th	4 × 400 m	3:27.51
1985	Universiade	Kobe, Japan	3rd	100 m	11.35
1985	Universiade	Kobe, Japan	1st	200 m	22.59
1985	World Cup	Canberra, Australia	=2nd	100 m	11.30
1985	World Cup	Canberra, Australia	2nd	200 m	22.61
1985	World Cup	Canberra, Australia	4th	4 × 100 m	43.39
1987	World Indoor Championships	Indianapolis, United States	3rd	200 m	23.21
1988	Olympic Games	Seoul, South Korea	4th	100 m	10.97w
1988	Olympic Games	Seoul, South Korea	2nd	200 m	21.72
1988	Olympic Games	Seoul, South Korea		4 × 100 m	DNS final
1989	World Indoor Championships	Budapest, Hungary	2nd	200 m	22.95
1989	World Cup	Barcelona, Spain	3rd	200 m	22.87
1989	World Cup	Barcelona, Spain	4th	4 × 100 m	43.58
1989	World Cup	Barcelona, Spain	1st	4 × 400 m	3:23.05
1992	Olympic Games	Barcelona, Spain	6th	200 m	22.58
