= Wassana Panyapuek =

Thai sprinter

Personal information
- Nationality: Thai
- Born: 14 December 1968 (age 56)

Sport
- Sport: Sprinting
- Event: 4 × 100 metres relay

Wassana Panyapuek (born 14 December 1968) is a Thai sprinter. She competed in the women's 4 × 100 metres relay at the 1984 Summer Olympics.
