= Emma Tahapari =

Indonesian sprinter

Personal information
- Nationality: Indonesian
- Born: 7 April 1961 (age 65) Jakarta, Indonesia

Sport
- Sport: Sprinting
- Event: 200 metres
Medal record
Women's athletics
Representing Indonesia
Asian Championships
Bronze medal – third place	1985 Jakarta	400 m
SEA Games
Gold medal – first place	1983 Singapore	400 m

Emma Tahapari (born 7 April 1961) is an Indonesian sprinter. She competed in the women's 200 metres at the 1984 Summer Olympics.
