= Jamaican sportsperson of the year =

Annual sports award in Jamaica

The Jamaican Sportsman and Sportswoman of the Year is an annual election, organised by the RJR Sports Foundation, which honours outstanding achievement(s) in sport by Jamaican athletes during the previous year.

== List of winners ==
Year	Sportsman of the Year		Sportswoman of the Year		Ref
Year	Winner	Sport	Winner	Sport	Ref
1961	Bunny Grant	Boxing	Joy Foster	Table tennis	
1962	George Kerr	Athletics	Monica DeSouza	Table tennis	
1963	Noel Douglas	Cycling	Una Morris	Athletics	
1964	Percy Hayles	Boxing	Una Morris (2)	Athletics	
1965	Phillip Alexander	Swimming	Sarah Newland	Paralympian	
1966	Jackie Hendriks	Cricket	Carmen Smith	Athletics	
1967	Octavius Morgan	Paralympian	Monica DeSouza (2)	Table tennis	
1968	Orville Haslam	Table tennis	Frances Noble	Swimming	
1969	Paul Nash	Swimming	Audrey Reid	Athletics	
1970	Donald Quarrie	Athletics	Marilyn Neufville	Athletics	
1971	Donald Quarrie (2)	Athletics	Marilyn Neufville (2)	Athletics	
1972	Lawrence Rowe	Cricket	Audrey Reid (2)	Athletics	
1973	Maurice Foster	Cricket	Andrea Bruce	Athletics	
1974	Lawrence Rowe (2)	Cricket	Belinda Phillips	Swimming	
1975	Donald Quarrie (3)	Athletics	Andrea Bruce (2)	Athletics	
1976	Donald Quarrie (4)	Athletics	Vivalyn Latty-Scott	Cricket	
1977	Donald Quarrie (5)	Athletics	Helen Blake	Athletics	
1978	Mike McCallum	Boxing	Leleith Hodges	Athletics	
1979	David Weller	Cycling	Merlene Ottey	Athletics	
1980	David Weller (2)	Cycling	Merlene Ottey (2)	Athletics	
1981	Bertland Cameron	Athletics	Jacqueline Pusey	Athletics	
1982	Bertland Cameron (2)	Athletics	Merlene Ottey (3)	Athletics	
1983	Bertland Cameron (3)	Athletics	Merlene Ottey (4)	Athletics	
1984	Mike McCallum (2)	Boxing	Merlene Ottey-Page (5)	Athletics	
1985	Mike McCallum (3)	Boxing	Merlene Ottey-Page (6)	Athletics	
1986	Mike McCallum (4)	Boxing	Grace Jackson	Athletics	
1987	Mike McCallum (5)	Boxing	Merlene Ottey (7)	Athletics	
1988	Jeff Dujon	Cricket	Grace Jackson (2)	Athletics	
1989	Mike McCallum (6)	Boxing	Merlene Ottey (8)	Athletics	
1990	Mike McCallum (7)	Boxing	Merlene Ottey (9)	Athletics	
1991	Patrick Patterson	Cricket	Merlene Ottey (10)	Athletics	
1992	Winthrop Graham	Athletics	Juliet Cuthbert	Athletics	
1993	Winthrop Graham (2)	Athletics	Merlene Ottey (11)	Athletics	
1994	Jimmy Adams	Cricket	Merlene Ottey (12)	Athletics	
1995	James Beckford	Athletics	Merlene Ottey (13)	Athletics	
1996	James Beckford (2)	Athletics	Deon Hemmings	Athletics	
1997	Deon Burton	Association football	Michelle Freeman	Athletics	
1998	Courtney Walsh	Cricket	Sandie Richards	Athletics	
1999	Courtney Walsh (2)	Cricket	Beverly McDonald	Athletics	
2000	Courtney Walsh (3)	Cricket	Deon Hemmings (2)	Athletics	
2000	Courtney Walsh (3)	Cricket	Lorraine Fenton	Athletics	
2001	Christopher Williams	Athletics	Lorraine Fenton (2)	Athletics	
2002	Michael Blackwood	Athletics	Brigitte Foster	Athletics	
2003	James Beckford (3)	Athletics	Brigitte Foster (2)	Athletics	
2004	Danny McFarlane	Athletics	Veronica Campbell-Brown	Athletics	
2005	Asafa Powell	Athletics	Trecia-Kaye Smith	Athletics	
2006	Asafa Powell (2)	Athletics	Sherone Simpson	Athletics	
2007	Asafa Powell (3)	Athletics	Veronica Campbell-Brown (2)	Athletics	
2008	Usain Bolt	Athletics	Veronica Campbell-Brown (3)	Athletics	
2008	Usain Bolt	Athletics	Melaine Walker	Athletics	
2009	Usain Bolt (2)	Athletics	Brigitte Foster-Hylton (3)	Athletics	
2010	Chris Gayle	Cricket	Veronica Campbell-Brown (4)	Athletics	
2011	Usain Bolt (3)	Athletics	Veronica Campbell-Brown (5)	Athletics	
2012	Usain Bolt (4)	Athletics	Shelly-Ann Fraser-Pryce	Athletics	
2013	Usain Bolt (5)	Athletics	Shelly-Ann Fraser-Pryce (2)	Athletics	
2014	Nicholas Walters	Boxing	Alia Atkinson	Swimming	
2015	Usain Bolt (6)	Athletics	Shelly-Ann Fraser-Pryce (3)	Athletics	
2016	Usain Bolt (7)	Athletics	Elaine Thompson	Athletics	
2017	Omar McLeod	Athletics	Alia Atkinson (2)	Swimming	
2018	Fedrick Dacres	Athletics	Alia Atkinson (3)	Swimming	
2019	Tajay Gayle	Athletics	Shelly-Ann Fraser-Pryce (4)	Athletics	
2021	Hansle Parchment	Athletics	Elaine Thompson-Herah (2)	Athletics	
2022	Rasheed Broadbell	Athletics	Shelly-Ann Fraser-Pryce (5)	Athletics	
2023	Antonio Watson	Athletics	Shericka Jackson	Athletics	
2024	Rojé Stona	Athletics	Shanieka Ricketts	Athletics	
2025	Oblique Seville	Athletics	Tina Clayton	Athletics	

== See also ==
- Athlete of the Year
- Laureus World Sports Award for Sportsman of the Year (Laureus World Sports Academy)
- Laureus World Sports Award for Sportswoman of the Year
- L'Équipe Champion of Champions Award
