= Veronica Findlay =

Jamaican sprinter

Personal information
- Nationality: Jamaican
- Born: 6 January 1964 (age 61)

Sport
- Sport: Sprinting
- Event: 4 × 100 metres relay

Veronica Findlay (born 6 January 1964) is a Jamaican sprinter. She competed in the women's 4 × 100 metres relay at the 1984 Summer Olympics.
