= Binta Jambane =

Mozambican sprinter

Personal information
- Nationality: Mozambican
- Born: 14 May 1942 (age 83)

Sport
- Sport: Sprinting
- Event: 100 metres

Binta Jambane (born 14 May 1942) is a Mozambican sprinter. She competed in the women's 100 metres at the 1984 Summer Olympics.
