= Janet Burke =

Jamaican sprinter

Personal information
- Nationality: Jamaican
- Born: 11 November 1962 (age 62)

Sport
- Sport: Sprinting
- Event: 200 metres

Janet Burke (born 11 November 1962) is a Jamaican sprinter. She competed in the women's 200 metres at the 1984 Summer Olympics.

Running for the Nebraska Cornhuskers track and field team, Burke won the 1983 inaugural 60 meters at the NCAA Division I Indoor Track and Field Championships.
