= Françoise M'Pika =

Congolese sprinter

Personal information
- Nationality: Congolese
- Born: 21 May 1956 (age 69)

Sport
- Sport: Sprinting
- Event: 100 metres

Françoise M'Pika (born 21 May 1956) is a Congolese sprinter. She competed in the women's 100 metres at the 1984 Summer Olympics.
