= Mo Myung-hee =

South Korean sprinter

Personal information
- Nationality: South Korean
- Born: 4 March 1963 (age 63)

Korean name
- Hangul: 모명희
- Hanja: 牟明姬
- RR: Mo Myeonghui
- MR: Mo Myŏnghŭi

Sport
- Sport: Sprinting
- Event: 200 metres
Medal record
Women's athletics
Representing South Korea
Asian Championships
| Silver medal – second place | 1979 Tokyo | 200 m |
| Bronze medal – third place | 1979 Tokyo | 100 m |
| Bronze medal – third place | 1981 Tokyo | 4×100 m |
| Bronze medal – third place | 1983 Kuwait City | 200 m |

Mo Myung-hee (born 4 March 1963) is a South Korean sprinter. She competed in the women's 200 metres at the 1984 Summer Olympics.

Mo was chosen for the South Korean national team as a first-year student at Inil Girls' High School, (Note: 인일여자고등학교; 仁一女子高等學校; Inil Yeoja Godeunghakgyo) and later attended Seoul National University. She originally announced her retirement five years later in December 1983, but later chose to continue competing.
