= Michaela Schabinger =

German sprinter

Personal information
- Nationality: German
- Born: 23 March 1961 (age 64)

Sport
- Sport: Sprinting
- Event: 200 metres

Michaela Schabinger (born 23 March 1961) is a German sprinter. She competed in the women's 200 metres at the 1984 Summer Olympics representing West Germany.
