= Mary Mensah =

Ghanaian sprinter

Personal information
- Nationality: Ghanaian
- Born: 24 June 1963 (age 63)

Sport
- Sport: Sprinting
- Event: 4 × 100 metres relay
Medal record
Women's athletics
Representing Ghana
African Championships
Bronze medal – third place	1985 Cairo	4×400 m

Mary Mensah (born 24 June 1963) is a Ghanaian sprinter. She competed in the women's 4 × 100 metres relay at the 1984 Summer Olympics.
