= Amie N'Dow =

Gambian sprinter

Personal information
- Nationality: Gambian
- Born: 12 March 1958 (age 68)

Sport
- Sport: Sprinting
- Event: 200 metres
Medal record
Women's athletics
Representing Gambia
African Championships
Bronze medal – third place	1984 Rabat	4×100 m

Amie N'Dow (born 12 March 1958) is a Gambian sprinter. She competed in the women's 200 metres at the 1984 Summer Olympics.
