= Marie-Ange Wirtz =

Seychellois sprinter

Personal information
- Nationality: Seychellois
- Born: 7 March 1963 (age 62)

Sport
- Sport: Sprinting
- Event: 100 metres

Marie-Ange Wirtz (born 7 March 1963) is a Seychellois sprinter. She competed in the women's 100 metres at the 1984 Summer Olympics.
