= Marita Payne =

Canadian athlete (born 1960)

Marita Payne-Wiggins
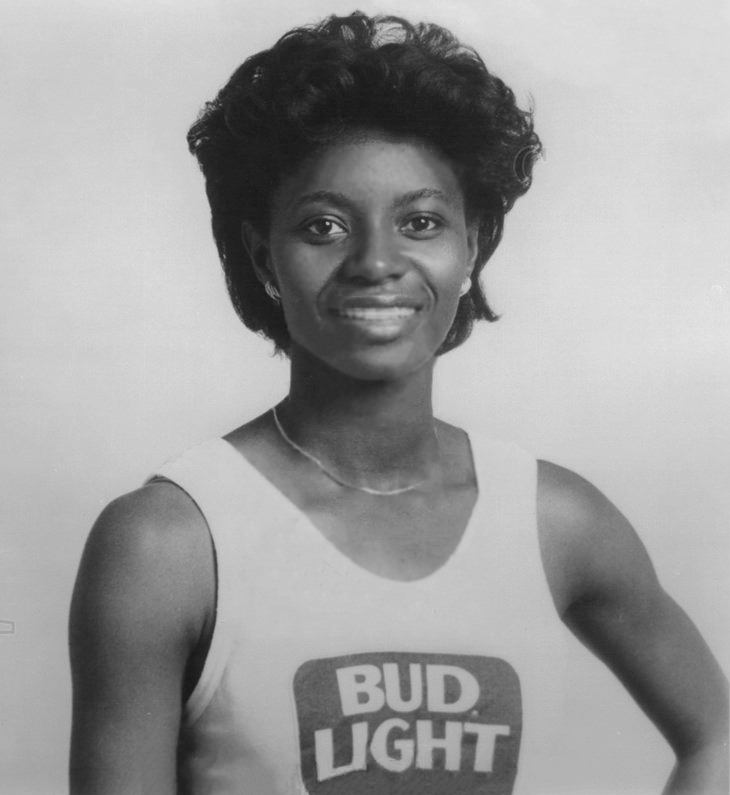

Personal information
- Nationality: Canadian
- Born: October 7, 1960 (age 65) Bridgetown, Barbados
- Height: 1.73 m (5 ft 8 in)
- Weight: 57 kg (126 lb)

Sport
- Sport: Running
- Event: 100–400 m
- Club: York Optimists/Concord

Achievements and titles
- Personal best(s): 100 m – 11.43 (1983); 200 m – 22.62 (1983); 400 m – 49.91 (1984)
Medal record
Representing Canada
Olympic Games
Silver medal – second place	1984 Los Angeles	4×100 m relay
Silver medal – second place	1984 Los Angeles	4×400 m relay
Commonwealth Games
Gold medal – first place	1986 Edinburgh	4×400 m relay
Silver medal – second place	1982 Brisbane	4×100 m relay
Pan American Games
Silver medal – second place	1983 Caracas	4×400 m relay
Silver medal – second place	1987 Indianapolis	4×400 m relay
Bronze medal – third place	1979 San Juan	4×400 m relay
Summer Universiade
Silver medal – second place	1983 Edmonton	200 m
Silver medal – second place	1983 Edmonton	4×100 m relay
Silver medal – second place	1983 Edmonton	4×400 m relay
Representing Americas
World Cup
Bronze medal – third place	1981 Rome	4×400 m relay

Marita Payne-Wiggins (born October 7, 1960) is a Canadian former track and field athlete who competed in two consecutive Summer Olympics. She is the co-Canadian record holder in the 400 metres, along with Jillian Richardson, and previously held the Canadian record in the 200 metres.

== Early life and education ==
Payne was born in Barbados and spent her early childhood in Christ Church, Barbados. As a young child, her parents, Ina and Clarence Payne, moved to New York City for school and work, leaving her behind in Barbados. In 1970, when Payne was nine, she rejoined her parents and the family settled in Toronto, Ontario, and later in Concord, Ontario. She attended Vaughan Road Collegiate Institute in Toronto, where she blossomed into a star sprinter, becoming an Ontario provincial champion in both the senior 100 metres and 200 metres in 1979.

In 1980, Payne enrolled at Florida State University (FSU), where she competed for the Seminoles track and field team before graduating in 1984. A 21-time NCAA All-American, she was a 400 metres national champion in 1982 and 1984; a 4 × 100 metres relay national champion in 1981, 1983, and 1984; an indoor 4 × 200 metres relay national champion in 1981; and a 4 × 400 metres relay national champion in 1983 and 1984. Payne also met her husband Mitchell Wiggins at FSU, while he played for the Seminoles basketball team.

== Career ==
Payne began competing for Canada at the 1979 Pan American Games, where she won a bronze medal with the 4 × 400 metres relay team. In 1981, she was a member of the Americas 4 × 400 metres relay team that took bronze at the IAAF World Cup in Rome. The following year, at the Commonwealth Games, she won a silver medal with the Canadian team in the 4 × 100 metres relay, and was a 400 metres semi-finalist.

Payne won a silver medal in the 200 metres, at the 1983 Universiade, and helped Canada win silver medals in both the 4 × 100 and 4 × 400 metre relays. That year, she also won a silver medal in the 4 × 400 metres relay at the Pan American Games. She competed in the inaugural World Championships two weeks earlier. At the championships, held in Helsinki, she finished fifth in the 400 metres – the best performance by a non-European athlete in the discipline, breaking the existing Commonwealth record with a time of 50.06. She also teamed up with her Canadian compatriots in the 4 × 100 and 4 × 400 metres relay events, where they finished fifth and fourth in the finals, respectively.

At the 1984 Summer Olympics, held in Los Angeles, Payne won a silver medal in the 4 × 400 metres relay with her teammates Charmaine Crooks, Jillian Richardson and Molly Killingbeck. She also competed with her teammates Angela Bailey, Angella Taylor-Issajenko and France Gareau in the 4 × 100 metres relay, in which the team also won a silver medal. She finished fourth in the individual 400 metres, establishing a new Canadian record (49.91).

Payne helped the Canadian 4 × 400 metres relay team win a gold medal, and finished fourth in the individual 400 metres race, at the 1986 Commonwealth Games. In 1987, she won her second silver medal in the 4 × 400 metres relay at the Pan American Games. A few weeks later, she reached the semi-finals of the 400 metres at the World Championships, and along with Crooks, Killingbeck and Richardson, she took Canada to the fourth position in the 4 × 400 metres relay. The team reunited for the 1988 Summer Olympics in Seoul, but failed to finish in the relay final. She was a semi-finalist in the individual 400 metres race. Shortly after the Olympics, she retired from track and field.

== Post career ==
Payne was inducted into the FSU Hall of Fame in 1991. Ten years later, she was inducted into the Canadian Olympic Hall of Fame.

The City of Vaughan, Ontario named a park in her honour. Marita Payne Park, located in Concord, where she was raised, is also within walking distance of her family's current residence in Vaughan.

== Personal life ==
Payne is married to former NBA player Mitchell Wiggins. Their son Andrew was selected first overall in the 2014 NBA draft by the Cleveland Cavaliers. He was then traded to the Minnesota Timberwolves. He currently plays for the Miami Heat. They have two other sons, Nick, who played basketball for the Wichita State Shockers and Mitchell II, and three daughters: Stephanie, Angelica, and Taya. Since 2002, the family has resided in Vaughan.

== Achievements ==
- Two-time Canadian 400 metres champion (1981, 1984)
- Co-holder of Canadian 400 metres record with Jillian Richardson (49.91)
- Previous holder of Canadian 200 metres record (22.62)^{[a]}

Year	Competition	Venue	Position	Event	Notes
Representing Canada
1979	Pan American Games	San Juan, Puerto Rico	3rd	4 × 400 m	3:37.60
1979	World Cup	Montreal, Canada	4th	400 m	53.01
1979	World Cup	Montreal, Canada	5th	4 × 400 m	3:28.50
1981	World Cup	Rome, Italy	3rd	4 × 400 m	3:26.42
1982	Commonwealth Games	Brisbane, Australia	semi-final	400 m	54.06
1982	Commonwealth Games	Brisbane, Australia	2nd	4 × 100 m	43.66
1983	Universiade (World Student Games)	Edmonton, Canada	2nd	200 m	22.62
1983	Universiade (World Student Games)	Edmonton, Canada	2nd	4 × 100 m	43.21
1983	Universiade (World Student Games)	Edmonton, Canada	2nd	4 × 400 m	3:25.26
1983	World Championships	Helsinki, Finland	5th	400 m	50.06
1983	World Championships	Helsinki, Finland	5th	4 × 100 m	43.05
1983	World Championships	Helsinki, Finland	4th	4 × 400 m	3:27.57
1983	Pan American Games	Caracas, Venezuela	2nd	4 × 400 m	3:30.24
1984	Olympic Games	Los Angeles, United States	4th	400 m	49.91
1984	Olympic Games	Los Angeles, United States	2nd	4 × 100 m	42.77
1984	Olympic Games	Los Angeles, United States	2nd	4 × 400 m	3:21.21
1986	Commonwealth Games	Edinburgh, Scotland	4th	400 m	52.00
1986	Commonwealth Games	Edinburgh, Scotland	1st	4 × 400 m	3:28.92
1987	Pan American Games	Indianapolis, United States	2nd	4 × 400 m	3:29.18
1987	World Championships	Rome, Italy	semi-final	400 m	51.75
1987	World Championships	Rome, Italy	4th	4 × 400 m	3:24.11
1988	Olympic Games	Seoul, South Korea	semi-final	400 m	50.29
1988	Olympic Games	Seoul, South Korea	DNF	4 × 400 m	3:27.63 (in heat)

- ^{a} Angella Taylor-Issajenko's record of 22.25 was later annulled, due to doping violations.

== See also ==
- Canadian records in track and field
