= Evelyn Ashford =

American sprinter

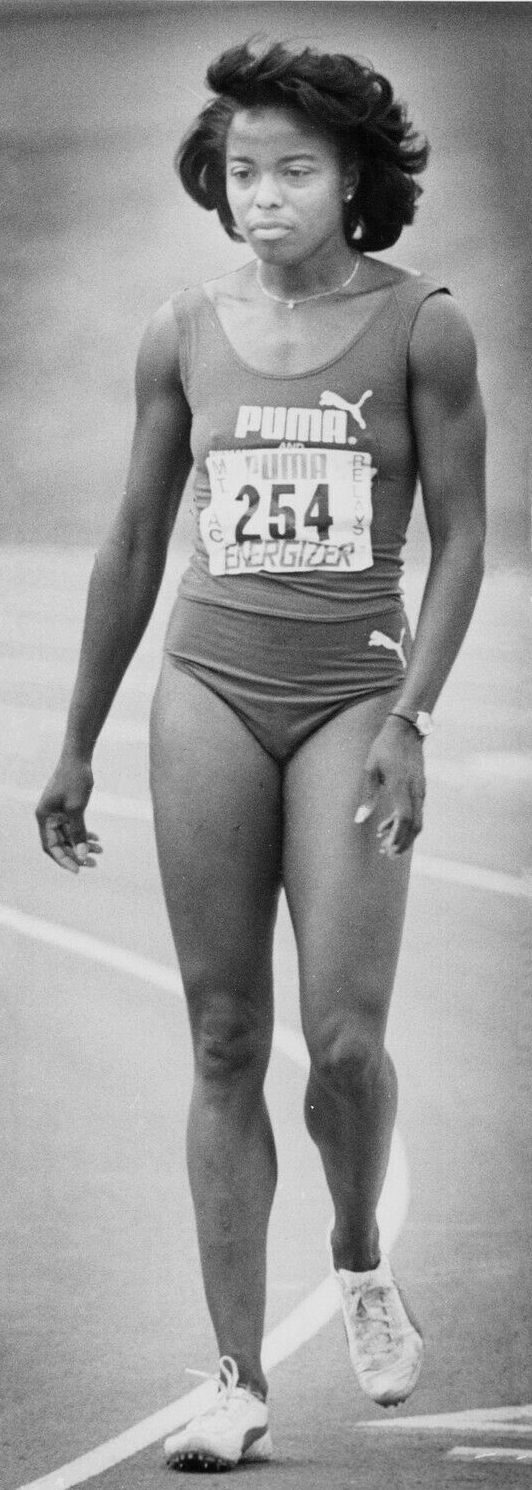
- Ashford in 1984

Personal information
- Born: April 15, 1957 (age 69) Shreveport, Louisiana, U.S.
- Height: 165 cm (5 ft 5 in)
- Weight: 53 kg (117 lb)

Sport
- Sport: Athletics
- Event: 60–400 m

Achievements and titles
- Personal bests: 60 yd: 6.54 WR (1982); 100 m: 10.76 (1984); 200 m: 21.83 (1979); 400 m: 51.57 (1979)
Medal record
Representing the United States
Olympic Games
Gold medal – first place	1984 Los Angeles	100 m
Gold medal – first place	1984 Los Angeles	4 × 100 m relay
Gold medal – first place	1988 Seoul	4 × 100 m relay
Gold medal – first place	1992 Barcelona	4 × 100 m relay
Silver medal – second place	1988 Seoul	100 m
Goodwill Games
Gold medal – first place	1986 Moscow	100 m
Gold medal – first place	1986 Moscow	4 × 100 m relay
Gold medal – first place	1990 Seattle	4 × 100 m relay
Pan American Games
Gold medal – first place	1979 San Juan	100 m
Gold medal – first place	1979 San Juan	200 m

Evelyn Ashford (born April 15, 1957) is an American retired track and field athlete, the 1984 Olympic champion in the 100-meter dash, and the world record-holder in the 60-yard dash. She ran under the 11-second barrier over 30 times and was the first woman to run under 11 seconds in an Olympic Games. Ashford has the distinction of owning the longest unbroken athletics record (60y dash).

== Biography ==
As a 19-year-old, Ashford finished fifth in the 100 m event at the 1976 Summer Olympics. After beating the world record holders in the 100 m and 200 m in 1979 at the World Cup of Track and Field in Montreal, Ashford was one of the potential medalists for the 1980 Summer Olympics, but these Games were boycotted by the United States. Ashford also tore a quad muscle in 1980 and was out for the rest of the season.

In 1977, she won the first Broderick Award (now the Honda Sports Award) as the nation's best female collegiate track and field athlete.

Ashford was ranked No. 1 in the world by Track & Field News over 100 meters in 1979 and 1981, and over 200 meters in 1981. She also was named Track and Field News "Athlete of the Year" twice, in 1981 and 1984

She again won the sprint double, at the world cup in Rome, in 1981.

On July 3, 1983, she set her first world record for the 100 meters, running 10.79 seconds at the National Sports Festival in Colorado Springs, Colorado, and was one of the favorites to win the 100-meter title at the inaugural World Championships in Helsinki. In the final, however, she pulled a hamstring muscle and fell. The other main favorite, Marlies Göhr of East Germany (who had already beaten Ashford earlier that year), went on to win.

At the 1984 Summer Olympics, Ashford had a chance to win a gold medal. However, she had to withdraw from the 200 m heats with a minor injury. She competed in the 100 m, winning the event in a new Olympic record of 10.97 secs. As the anchor runner for 4 × 100 m relay team, she won a second gold medal. In the absence of World Champions and world record holders East Germany, the US team clocked one of the fastest times in history and won by the biggest margin ever at an Olympics, 1.12 seconds.

Later in the season, she finally defeated her main rival Göhr at the Weltklasse meeting in Zürich, Switzerland. The race saw Ashford make up half a meter or so over Göhr and lower her own world record to 10.76 seconds. That race proved to be Ashford's personal record. It still ranks as the No. 13 individual all-time. Ashford regained her No. 1 Track & Field News ranking.

At the 1988 Summer Olympics, she was the flag bearer for the United States team at the Opening Ceremony. She was beaten in the 100 m by Florence Griffith Joyner, who had broken her world record earlier in the season at the Olympic Trials. In the 4 × 100 m relay she again ran the final leg, winning her third Olympic gold medal despite a less than perfect last exchange between Griffith-Joyner and Ashford that required Ashford to run a sensational final leg to overtake Göhr.

At her last Olympics in Barcelona, Ashford, aged 35, was eliminated in the 100 m semi-finals by 1/100 of a second; she went on to win her third straight Olympic 4 × 100 m relay gold, this time running the first leg. She is one of six women to have won four gold medals in track and field Olympic history.

Ashford came back from season-ending injuries three times, to reach the top of the sport in the following year. In 1980 she injured her quad, and returned in 1981 with the sprint double at the World Cup and the number one world ranking in both sprints. After an injury in 1983, she became double Olympic Champion in 1984. In 1987 a hamstring pull prevented her from competing at the World Championships, then a season later added an Olympic Silver and third Gold medal to her collection.

On May 30, 1985, she gave birth to her daughter Raina Ashley Washington, and again came back for an excellent 1986, losing only once over both the 100 m and 200 m, and winning the 100 meter title at the Goodwill Games; earning another No. 1 ranking by Track & Field News over the shorter distance.

After parting ways with her coach Pat Connolly in 1985, Ashford was largely self-coached.

In 1997, Ashford was inducted into the National Track and Field Hall of Fame, where she is said to be "one of the greatest track and field runners ever". Ashford went to the University of California, Los Angeles and Roseville High School. She was inducted into the UCLA Athletics Hall of Fame in 1990.

Olympic Games
Preceded by Lyle Nelson	Flagbearer for United States; Seoul 1988	Succeeded by Bill Koch
Records
Preceded by Marlies Göhr	Women's 100 m World Record Holder; July 3, 1983 – July 16, 1988	Succeeded by Florence Griffith Joyner
Awards and achievements
Preceded by Ilona Briesenick; Jarmila Kratochvílová	Women's Track & Field Athlete of the Year; 1981; 1984	Succeeded by Marita Koch
Preceded by Jackie Joyner-Kersee	Flo Hyman Memorial Award; 1989	Succeeded by Chris Evert
New award	Women's Track & Field ESPY Award; 1993	Succeeded by Gail Devers
Sporting positions
Preceded by Bärbel Wöckel	Women's 200 m Best Year Performance; 1981	Succeeded by Marita Koch
