= Angela Bailey =

Canadian sprinter (1962–2021)

Personal information
- Nationality: Canadian
- Born: 28 February 1962 Coventry, Warwickshire, England
- Died: 31 July 2021 (aged 59) Toronto, Ontario, Canada

Sport
- Country: Canada
- Sport: Athletics
- Event: Sprinting
Medal record
Representing Canada
Olympic Games
Silver medal – second place	1984 Los Angeles	4x100m Relay
World Indoor Championships
Bronze medal – third place	1987 Indianapolis	60m
Commonwealth Games
Silver medal – second place	1978 Edmonton	4x100 metres
Silver medal – second place	1982 Brisbane	4x100 metres
Silver medal – second place	1986 Edinburgh	4x100 metres
Pacific Conference Games
Gold medal – first place	1981 Christchurch	100 metres
Gold medal – first place	1981 Christchurch	200 metres
Gold medal – first place	1981 Christchurch	4x100 metres
Pan American Junior Championships
Gold medal – first place	1980 Sudbury	100 metres
Gold medal – first place	1980 Sudbury	200 metres

Angela Bailey (28 February 1962 – 31 July 2021) was a Canadian track and field athlete. She was the Canadian record holder in the 100 metres with her personal best of 10.98 seconds in 1987. She also holds the 200 metres indoor national record with 23.32 seconds in 1984. She won an Olympic silver medal in the 4×100 metres relay in 1984, three relay silver medals at the Commonwealth Games, and a bronze medal in the 60 metres at the 1987 World Indoor Championships.

== Career ==
Bailey was born in Coventry, Warwickshire, England. She first came to international attention at the Commonwealth Games in Edmonton in 1978. In 1980, she won gold in both 100 metres and 200 metres at the first Pan American Junior Track and Field Championships in Sudbury, defeating the favoured American sprinter Michele Glover decisively in both distances. She was selected for the 1980 Olympic team but Canada boycotted the Moscow event.

Bailey won all her races on a tour of New Zealand in late 1981, which included three gold medals at the Pacific Conference Games in the 100m, 200m and 4 x 100m relay. She placed fourth in the 100 meters and seventh in the 200 metres at the 1982 Commonwealth Games, and was again fourth in the 100 metres in 1986. She won a silver medal for the 4×100 m relay at the 1978 Commonwealth Games, and did so again in both the 1982 and 1986 games.

At the 1983 World Championships, Bailey placed fifth in the 100 metres, seventh in the 200 metres and fifth in the 4×100 m relay. At the 1984 Los Angeles Olympics, she came in sixth in the 100 metres and won a silver medal in the 4×100 metres relay with Marita Payne, Angella Taylor and France Gareau.

Bailey was a two-time All-American for the UCLA Bruins track and field team, finishing 4th in the 4 × 100 meters relay and 5th in the 4 × 400 meters relay at the 1985 NCAA Division I Outdoor Track and Field Championships.

Originally fourth in the 60 metres final at the 1987 World Indoor Championships, Bailey was promoted to the bronze medal in 1989, due to the disqualification of Canadian team-mate Angella Issajenko after the Dubin Inquiry. She set the Canadian 100 metres record with 10.98 secs on 6 July 1987 in Budapest, and went on to finish seventh in the 100 metres final at the 1987 World Championships in Rome. She was a quarter-finalist in the 100 metres at the 1988 Seoul Olympics.

== Death ==
Diagnosed with Stage IV lung cancer in the fall of 2020, Bailey died of cancer in Toronto on 31 July 2021, aged 59. A statement from the family read, in part, that Bailey "persevered with amazing strength and resilience as she battled cancer alongside her five year struggle with mental illness."

== National titles ==
- Canadian Track and Field Championships
  - 100 metres: 1985, 1990
  - 200 metres: 1985

== International competitions ==
Representing Canada
Year	Competition	Venue	Position	Event	Notes
1978	Commonwealth Games	Edmonton, Alberta, Canada	semi-final	100 m	11.63
1978	Commonwealth Games	Edmonton, Alberta, Canada	heats	200 m	23.91
1978	Commonwealth Games	Edmonton, Alberta, Canada	2nd	4x100 m	44.26
1980	Pan American Junior Championships	Sudbury, Ontario, Canada	1st	100 m	11.55
1980	Pan American Junior Championships	Sudbury, Ontario, Canada	1st	200 m	23.44w
1981	Pacific Conference Games	Christchurch, New Zealand	1st	100 m	11.46
1981	Pacific Conference Games	Christchurch, New Zealand	1st	200m	23.37
1981	Pacific Conference Games	Christchurch, New Zealand	1st	4x100m	44.50
1981	World Cup	Rome, Italy	4th	4x100 m	43.06
1982	Commonwealth Games	Brisbane, Australia	4th	100 m	11.30
1982	Commonwealth Games	Brisbane, Australia	8th	200 m	23.42
1982	Commonwealth Games	Brisbane, Australia	2nd	4x100 m	43.66
1983	World Championships	Helsinki, Finland	5th	100 m	11.20
1983	World Championships	Helsinki, Finland	7th	200 m	22.93 (wind 1.5)
1983	World Championships	Helsinki, Finland	5th	4x100 m	43.05
1984	Olympic Games	Los Angeles, United States	6th	100 m	11.40
1984	Olympic Games	Los Angeles, United States	semi-final	200 m	22.75
1984	Olympic Games	Los Angeles, United States	2nd	4x100 m	42.77
1986	Commonwealth Games	Edinburgh, Scotland	4th	100 m	11.35w
1986	Commonwealth Games	Edinburgh, Scotland	2nd	4x100 m	43.83
1987	World Indoor Championships	Indianapolis, United States	3rd	60 m	7.12
1987	World Championships	Rome, Italy	7th	100 m	11.18
1987	World Championships	Rome, Italy	semi-final	200 m	22.97
1987	World Championships	Rome, Italy	6th	4x100 m	43.26
1988	Olympic Games	Seoul, South Korea	quarter-final	100 m	11.29
1988	Olympic Games	Seoul, South Korea	semi-final	4x100 m	43.82
1999	World Championships	Seville, Spain	6th	4x100 m	43.39

Note: At the 1987 World Indoor Championships, Bailey originally finished fourth. She was promoted to the bronze medal position in 1989 after her Canadian teammate Angella Issajenko, who had won the silver medal, was disqualified after admitting long term drug use at the Dubin Inquiry.
Note: At the 1981 World Cup, Bailey was representing the Americas continent.

== See also ==
- Canadian records in track and field
