= Angella Taylor-Issajenko =

Canadian sprinter (born 1958)

Personal information
- Born: Angella Taylor; September 28, 1958 (age 68) Jamaica
Medal record
Women's athletics
Representing Canada
Olympic Games
Silver medal – second place	1984 Los Angeles	4×100 m relay
Commonwealth Games
Gold medal – first place	1982 Brisbane	100 metres
Gold medal – first place	1982 Brisbane	4×400 metres
Silver medal – second place	1982 Brisbane	4×100 metres
Bronze medal – third place	1982 Brisbane	200 metres
Gold medal – first place	1986 Edinburgh	200 metres
Silver medal – second place	1986 Edinburgh	4×100 metres
Bronze medal – third place	1986 Edinburgh	100 metres
Pan American Games
Silver medal – second place	1979 San Juan	200 metres
Bronze medal – third place	1979 San Juan	100 metres
Universiade
Silver medal – second place	1983 Edmonton	4 × 100 m relay
Bronze medal – third place	1983 Edmonton	100 metres

Angella Taylor-Issajenko, CM (née Taylor; born September 28, 1958) is a Canadian coach and former sprinter. She won an Olympic silver medal in the 4 × 100 metres relay in Los Angeles 1984. At the Commonwealth Games she won seven medals, including the 100 metres title in Brisbane 1982 and the 200 metres in Edinburgh 1986.

== Career ==
Taylor was born in Jamaica on September 28, 1958. Her breakout performance came at the 1979 Pan Am Games, where she took a bronze in the 100 m and a silver in the 200 m, and set national records of 11.20 and 22.80 respectively. Despite Canada's boycott of the 1980 Olympic Games in Moscow, she dominated post-Olympic competition in the summer of 1980, winning several meets, and finishing second in the 100 m to Marlies Göhr, and third in the 200 m behind Bärbel Wöckel at the final stop in Zürich. She was the 200 m champion at the Liberty Bell Classic (which was an alternate to the boycotted Olympics). She lowered her national records to 11.12 for the 100 m and 22.55 for the 200 m by the end of the 1981 season.

Taylor was the 1982 Commonwealth 100 m champion in 11.00, a Commonwealth record and Games record, and anchored Canada to a gold in the 4 × 400 m relay, holding off Raelene Boyle. She also took a bronze in the 200 m and won a silver as part of the 4 × 100 m relay. Once again she improved upon the Canadian records for 100 m (11.00) and 200 m (22.25), She injured her sciatic nerve in the off-season training for the 1983 season, which troubled her for the rest of her career.

In 1983, she won a bronze in 100m at the World University Games held in Edmonton. She also won silver in the 4 x 100-metre relay. After finishing a disappointing seventh in the 100 metres at the world championships, she opted out of the relay. Taylor won an Olympic silver medal as part of the Canadian 4 × 100 m relay team in 1984. In 1985, she was made a Member of the Order of Canada. She also gave birth to her first child. In 1986, now known as Angella Issajenko, she was again Commonwealth Champion, this time in the 200 metres. She also won a bronze in the 100 m and a silver as a member of the 4 × 100 m relay team.

Issajenko broke the world 50 m record indoors with a 6.06 clocking in Ottawa in 1987. She won a silver medal in 1987 World Indoor Championships in a tight finish with Nelli Cooman, both women were timed in 7.08, but after a photo finish the judges gave the Championship to Cooman, who looked to have crossed the line with her shoulder first. In the summer of 1987, she again broke the national record for 100 m with a time of 10.97 and finished fifth at the World Championships. Between 1979–1987, she was ranked inside the world's top ten in the 100 metres six times, and in the 200 metres three times.

Taylor-Issajenko was a part of the doping regime of George Astaphan, the physician who supplied Ben Johnson with stanazolol. After Issajenko's training partner Johnson tested positive for stanozolol in 1988, she testified in the Dubin Inquiry and gave a detailed account of widespread substance abuse in athletics which included her reading from her diary. She later told her story to writers Martin O'Malley and Karen O'Reilly for her biography Running Risks which was a detailed tell-all of her sprinting experiences and her dealings with performance-enhancing drugs.

Today Issajenko is a single mother of four grown children. As of 2008, she works full-time with learning-disabled grade school students and has returned to track and field as a coach based out of the city of Toronto's track and field center on the York University campus.

Personal bests: 100m – 10.97, 200m – 22.25, 400m – 51.81 .

== Achievements ==
- 10 Times Canadian National 100 metres Champion 1979–84, 1986–88, 1992
- 8 Times Canadian National 200 metres Champion 1979–84, 1986–87

Year	Competition	Venue	Position	Event	Notes
Representing Canada
1978	Commonwealth Games	Edmonton, Alberta, Canada	heats	200 m	23.81
1979	Pan American Games	San Juan, Puerto Rico	3rd	100 m	11.36
1979	Pan American Games	San Juan, Puerto Rico	2nd	200 m	22.74w
1979	World Cup	Montreal, Quebec, Canada	5th	100 m	11.50
1979	World Cup	Montreal, Quebec, Canada	5th	200m	22.83
1979	World Cup	Montreal, Quebec, Canada	5th	4 × 100 m	43.99
1981	World Cup	Rome, Italy	4th	100m	11.18
1981	World Cup	Rome, Italy	4th	200m	22.67
1981	World Cup	Rome, Italy	4th	4 × 100 m	43.06
1982	Commonwealth Games	Brisbane, Australia	1st	100m	11.00
1982	Commonwealth Games	Brisbane, Australia	3rd	200 m	22.48w
1982	Commonwealth Games	Brisbane, Australia	2nd	4 × 100 m	43.66
1982	Commonwealth Games	Brisbane, Australia	1st	4 × 400 m	3:27.70
1983	Summer Universiade	Edmonton, Alberta, Canada	3rd	100 m	11.17
1983	Summer Universiade	Edmonton, Alberta, Canada	4th	200m	22.81
1983	Summer Universiade	Edmonton, Alberta, Canada	2nd	4 × 100 m	43.21
1983	World Championships	Helsinki, Finland	7th	100 m	11.30
1984	Olympic Games	Los Angeles, California, United States	8th	100 m	11.62
1984	Olympic Games	Los Angeles, California, United States	2nd	4 × 100 m	42.77
1986	Commonwealth Games	Edinburgh, Scotland	3rd	100 m	11.21
1986	Commonwealth Games	Edinburgh, Scotland	1st	200 m	22.91
1986	Commonwealth Games	Edinburgh, Scotland	2nd	4 × 100 m	43.83
1987	World Indoor Championships	Indianapolis, Indiana United States	DISQ	60 m	DISQ
1987	World Championships	Rome, Italy	5th	100 m	11.09
1987	World Championships	Rome, Italy	6th	4 × 100 m	43.26
1988	Olympic Games	Seoul, South Korea	quarter-final	100 m	11.27
1988	Olympic Games	Seoul, South Korea	semi-final	4 × 100 m	43.82

Note: In 1987, at the World Indoor Championships, Issajenko ran 7.08sec to win the silver medal behind Dutch Sprinter, Nelli Cooman. Then in 1989, after her admittance of long term drug use at the Dubin inquiry, the IAAF stripped her of this medal and promoted the Bulgarian Anelia Nuneva to the silver medal position and fellow Canadian Angela Bailey to bronze.
Note: At the World Cup in 1979 and 1981, Taylor-Issajenko was representing the Americas continent.

== See also ==
- List of sportspeople sanctioned for doping offences
