= Liliane Gaschet =

French sprinter

Personal information
- Born: 16 March 1962 (age 64) Fort-de-France, Martinique
- Height: 166 cm (5 ft 5 in)
- Weight: 55 kg (121 lb)

Sport
- Country: France
- Sport: Athletics
- Events: 100 m, 200 m
Medal record
Women's athletics
Representing France
European Championships
Bronze medal – third place	1982 Athens	4×100 m
Representing Martinique
CARIFTA Games
Bronze medal – third place	1981 Nassau	Junior 200 m

Liliane Gaschet (born 16 March 1962 in Fort-de-France, Martinique) is a French athlete who specialises in the 100 and 200 meters. Gaschet competed in the women's 100 and 200 meters and also the 4 x 100 meter relay at the 1984 Summer Olympics.

== Records ==
Personal records
Race	Performance	Place	Date
100m	11 s 31	Fort-de-France (FRA)	24 March 1984
200m	22 s 73	Memorial Coliseum, Los Angeles, CA (USA)	9 August 1984
4 × 100 m	42 s 69	Olympic Stadium, Athens (GRE)	11 September 1982
4 × 200 m	1 m 32 s 17	Paris (FRA)	9 July 1982
