= Merlene Ottey =

Jamaican-born Slovenian track athlete (born 1960)

The Honourable Merlene Ottey OJ OD
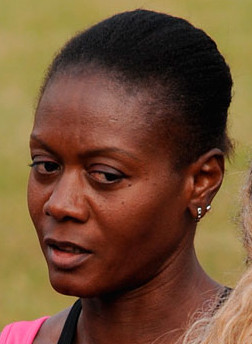
- Merlene Ottey in Warsaw, Poland, in September 2011

Personal information
- Full name: Merlene Joyce Ottey
- Citizenship: Jamaican (birth), Slovenia (since May 2002)
- Born: Merlene Joyce Ottey; 10 May 1960 (age 66) Cold Spring, Hanover, Colony of Jamaica, British Empire
- Height: 175 cm (5 ft 9 in)
- Weight: 62 kg (137 lb)
- Spouse: Nat Page (1984–1987; divorced)

Sport
- Country: Jamaica (1978–2002); Slovenia (2002–2012)
- Sport: Athletics
Medal record
Event	1st	2nd	3rd
Olympic Games (9 medals)	0	3	6
World Championships (14 medals)	3	4	7
World Indoor Championships (7 medals)	3	2	2
Total (30 medals)	6	9	15
Olympic Games
Silver medal – second place	1996 Atlanta	100 m
Silver medal – second place	1996 Atlanta	200 m
Silver medal – second place	2000 Sydney	4 × 100 m relay
Bronze medal – third place	1980 Moscow	200 m
Bronze medal – third place	1984 Los Angeles	100 m
Bronze medal – third place	1984 Los Angeles	200 m
Bronze medal – third place	1992 Barcelona	200 m
Bronze medal – third place	1996 Atlanta	4 × 100 m relay
Bronze medal – third place	2000 Sydney	100 m
World Championships
Gold medal – first place	1991 Tokyo	4 × 100 m relay
Gold medal – first place	1993 Stuttgart	200 m
Gold medal – first place	1995 Gothenburg	200 m
Silver medal – second place	1983 Helsinki	200 m
Silver medal – second place	1993 Stuttgart	100 m
Silver medal – second place	1995 Gothenburg	100 m
Silver medal – second place	1995 Gothenburg	4 × 100 m relay
Bronze medal – third place	1983 Helsinki	4 × 100 m relay
Bronze medal – third place	1987 Rome	100 m
Bronze medal – third place	1987 Rome	200 m
Bronze medal – third place	1991 Tokyo	100 m
Bronze medal – third place	1991 Tokyo	200 m
Bronze medal – third place	1993 Stuttgart	4 × 100 m relay
Bronze medal – third place	1997 Athens	200 m
World Indoor Championships
Gold medal – first place	1989 Budapest	200 m
Gold medal – first place	1991 Seville	200 m
Gold medal – first place	1995 Barcelona	60 m
Silver medal – second place	1987 Indianapolis	200 m
Silver medal – second place	1991 Seville	60 m
Bronze medal – third place	1989 Budapest	60 m
Bronze medal – third place	2003 Birmingham	60 m
Commonwealth Games
Gold medal – first place	1982 Brisbane	200 m
Gold medal – first place	1990 Auckland	200 m
Gold medal – first place	1990 Auckland	100 m
Silver medal – second place	1982 Brisbane	100 m
Bronze medal – third place	1982 Brisbane	4 × 100 m relay
Pan American Games
Silver medal – second place	1979 San Juan	4 × 100 m relay
Bronze medal – third place	1979 San Juan	200 m

Merlene Joyce Ottey (born 10 May 1960) is a Jamaican-Slovenian former track and field sprinter. She began her career representing Jamaica in 1978 and continued to do so for 24 years before representing Slovenia from 2002 to 2012. She is ranked sixth on the all-time list over 60 metres (indoor), eleventh on the all-time list over 100 metres and seventh on the all-time list over 200 metres. She is the current world indoor record holder for 200 metres with 21.87 seconds, set in 1993. She was named Jamaican Sportswoman of the Year 13 times between 1979 and 1995.

Ottey had the longest career as a top-level international sprinter appearing at the 1979 Pan American Games as a 19-year-old fresh from U-20 and Junior competitions, and concluding her career at age 52 when she anchored the Slovene 4 × 100 m relay team at the 2012 European Championships.

A nine-time Olympic medalist, she holds the record for the most Olympic appearances (seven) of any track and field athlete. Although gold medal success at the Olympics eluded Ottey, she was able to bring home three silvers and six bronze medals. She won 14 World Championship medals, and still holds the record (as of 2017) for most medals in individual events with 10. Her career achievements and longevity led to her being called the "Queen of the Track". Her proclivity for earning bronze medals in major championships earned her the title of "Bronze Queen" in track circles.

Ottey was formerly married to the American high jumper and 400 m hurdler Nat Page and was known as Merlene Ottey-Page during the mid-1980s.

== Life and sprinting career ==
Merlene Ottey was born to Hubert and Joan Ottey in Cold Spring, Hanover, Jamaica. She was introduced to the sport by her mother, who bought her a manual on track and field.

In her early school years in the 1970s, Ottey attended Gurneys Mount and Pondside Schools before graduating from Rusea's and Vere Technical High Schools. There, she frequently competed barefoot in local races.

Ottey's inspiration came from listening to the track and field broadcast from the 1976 Summer Olympics in Montreal, where Donald Quarrie ran in the sprint finals. Her athletics career took off when she moved to the US and attended the University of Nebraska–Lincoln in 1979, where she joined the track team. She won 14 individual national titles and earned 24 All-America awards, both of which are the most by any Husker student-athlete. Ottey won multiple NCAA titles in each of her five total seasons, including five combined indoor and outdoor titles in 1982 and four in 1981. She earned multiple All-America accolades in each of her five seasons, with seven combined All-America awards in 1982, six in 1980 and five in 1981. Ottey was also a member of Nebraska's indoor national championship teams in 1982, 1983 and 1984. She still holds Nebraska's top indoor marks in the 55- and 200-meter dashes and the program's top outdoor marks in the 100- and 200-meter dashes.

She represented Jamaica in the 1979 Pan American Games, winning a bronze medal in the 200 m. She graduated from university with a Bachelor of Arts degree, married fellow athlete Nathaniel Page in 1984, and briefly used the name Merlene Ottey-Page. The couple later divorced.

In the 1980 Moscow games, Ottey became the first female English-speaking Caribbean athlete to win an Olympic medal. Back in Jamaica, she was awarded an Officer of the Order of Nation and the Order of Distinction for "services in the field of sport".

In the 1982 Commonwealth Games, Ottey won a gold medal in the 200 m and a silver medal in the 100 m. Nearly a decade later, in the 1990 Commonwealth Games, she won gold in both events. Ottey was named Ambassador of Jamaica after winning her gold medal at the 1993 World Championships. She has also been named Jamaican Sportswoman of the Year 13 times between 1979 and 1995.

Throughout her career, she has won nine Olympic medals, which is second to Allyson Felix's eleven medals for the most by any woman in track and field history . These include three silver and six bronze medals. She had never won an Olympic gold medal but lost by five-thousandths of a second to Gail Devers in the 100 m final at the 1996 Summer Olympics in Atlanta when they both recorded the same time of 10.94 seconds. This was not her closest finish to Devers – she recorded a time of 10.812 seconds to Devers' 10.811 seconds in the 1993 World Championships in Stuttgart – still the closest finish at an international athletics meet.

Her seven Olympic appearances from 1980 to 2004 are the second most by any Track & Field athlete, after Spanish race walker Jesús Ángel García.

She held the record for most World Championship medals, winning 14 (three gold, three silver, eight bronze) between 1983 and 1997 until Allyson Felix took her total from 13 to 16 in 2017, to 18 in 2019, and to 20 in 2022. Ottey still holds the record for most World Championship medals in individual events, with 10. 13 of her medals at the Olympics and World Championships were bronze, earning her the nickname "the Bronze Queen" in racing circles. Ottey was appointed an Ambassador at Large by the Jamaican government in 1993. She was inducted into Nebraska's first Athletics Hall of Fame Class in 2015.

== Controversy ==
In 1999, during a meet in Lucerne, Switzerland, a urine sample submitted had returned positive for the banned anabolic steroid nandrolone. Her 'B' sample also contained higher than normal levels of the substance. Ottey was subsequently banned by the IAAF from competing in the World Championships in Seville, Spain.

Ottey fought to clear her name, asserting that charge was a "terrible mistake", and that she was innocent of knowingly taking steroids. In the summer of 2000, Ottey was cleared of all charges by the Jamaica Amateur Athletic Association; the IAAF lifted its two-year ban after the Court of Arbitration for Sport dismissed the case. The case was dismissed because the retesting order by the CAS was not completed in the time frame allotted.

In Jamaica, at the National Senior Trials before selection for the Olympics, Ottey placed a disappointing fourth. According to the rules of the Jamaica Amateur Athletics Association (JAAA), only athletes who had finished in the top three at the trials were eligible to run at the Olympics; she was only qualified to run on the 4 × 100 m relay team. Ottey asked that she be substituted for another team member, a courtesy that had been extended to others in the past. The JAAA's decision to replace Peta-Gaye Dowdie with Ottey caused widespread controversy. Dowdie's team members and many Jamaicans believed that Ottey had bullied her way onto the team. Jamaican 400 m Olympian and championship medallist Gregory Haughton led the notorious "Games Village" protests to oust Ottey, which made international headlines. The protest ended when the International Olympic Committee (IOC) threatened to throw the Jamaicans out of the Games if the team managers were not able to control their athletes.

At the 2000 Olympics, Ottey finished fourth in the 100 m, beaten from a medal by fellow Jamaican sprinter Tayna Lawrence. The race was won by Marion Jones, who registered 10.75 seconds, followed by Ekaterini Thanou of Greece in 11.12 seconds. Lawrence posted 11.18 seconds to Ottey's 11.19 seconds. In the 4 × 100 relay, the Jamaican team – bronze medalist Lawrence, teenager and newcomer Veronica Campbell, and Beverly McDonald – was anchored by Ottey to a silver medal. This medal gave Ottey her eighth medal, the most ever for a female athlete. Nine years later, after the disqualification of Jones for steroid abuse, Ottey's fourth place in the 100 m was retroactively promoted to third – giving Ottey her ninth medal – and Lawrence to second.

Due to the controversy, Ottey decided that "after Sydney, I said I wasn't going to run another race for Jamaica ... because I felt like the Jamaicans were trying to push me out of the sport, and I really needed to prove my point, that I might be 40 but I can still run."

== Slovenia ==
In 1998 Ottey moved to Slovenia and began training with Slovene coach Srđan Đorđević. There, she was still representing Jamaica. However, in May 2002, she became a Slovene citizen and resided in Ljubljana, where she represented her new country in international events.

Ottey competed for Slovenia in the 100 metres at the 2004 Summer Olympics in Athens, where she reached the semifinals. She finished 5th, missing out on qualification for the final by just 0.03s. At age 46, she competed in the 2006 European Championships in Athletics. She finished fifth in the semi-finals of the 100 metres and did not qualify for the final, which was won by Belgium's Kim Gevaert.

Ottey failed by 0.28 seconds to reach her eighth Olympic Games, aged 48 in 2008. Despite this, two years later, she qualified for the Slovenian 4 × 100-meter relay squad at the 2010 European Athletics Championships, where she became the oldest athlete ever to participate in the history of the European championships.

At the age of 52, Ottey competed in the 4 × 100 meters relay at the 2012 European Athletics Championships. The Slovenian team were ranked 22nd in the world before the 2012 Olympics with only the top 16 teams qualifying.

Since 2014, Ottey has lived in Switzerland.

== Records and achievements ==
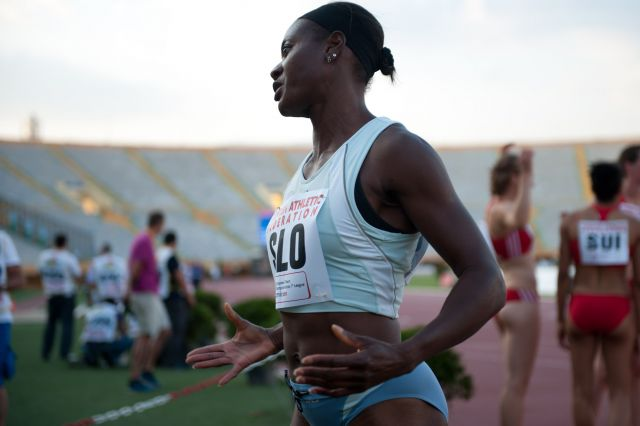
Ottey at the 2011 European Team Championships in İzmir

- Ottey ranks at number seven on the all-time list of the 200 metres, and number eleven on the 100 metres list.
- In 1990, Ottey was awarded the World Athlete of the Year and the Track & Field News Athlete of the Year awards.
- Ottey is the first female athlete to run 60 metres under seven seconds (6.96 in 1992).
- Ottey is the only woman to have run the 200 metres under 22 seconds indoors (21.87 in 1993).
- Ottey has the second 100 and 200 metres one day combination, with 10.93 and 21.66 (32.59 total) at the 1990 Weltklasse Zurich grand prix.
- Ottey has run 100 metres under eleven seconds – 68 times (plus 9 wind-assisted) a record among female sprinters.
- Ottey has run 200 metres under twenty-two seconds - 16 times (plus 1 wind-assisted), another record among female sprinters.
- Ottey has 57 consecutive wins in 100 metres – the most consecutive wins over 100 metres for a female and 34 consecutive wins at 200 metres.
- Ottey holds the official World Masters Athletics world records in the 100 m and 200 m for the age groups W35 ( 100- 10.74 in 1996, 200- 21.93 in 1995 ) W40 ( 100- 10.99 in 2000, 200- 22.74 in 2004 ) W45 ( 100- 11.34 in 2006, 200- 23.82 in 2006 ) W50 ( 100- 11.67 in 2010, 200- 24.33 in 2010 ).
- Ottey is the first from the Western Hemisphere (outside the USA) to win two individual medals at the same Olympic Games.
- At the 1995 World Championships, Ottey became the oldest ever female gold medallist when she won the 200 m at age 35 years 92 days. At the 1997 World Championships in Athens, she became the oldest female medallist ever at 37 years 90 days, when she won the bronze medal. In the 2000 Olympics, at age 40, Ottey became the oldest female track and field medalist when she anchored the Jamaican women's 4 × 100 metres to a silver medal. With the disqualification of Marion Jones, she was awarded the bronze medal in the 100 metres, making her the oldest individual medallist.
- Ottey, along with Carl Lewis, Usain Bolt and Allyson Felix, is one of four athletes to win twenty or more medals at the Olympic Games and the World Championships (combined).
- Ottey holds the record for running the fastest women's Indoor 200 metres in 21.87 seconds. This record has stood since 1993 and remains (as of 2016) the only sub-22sec clocking by a woman indoors.
- In six World Championships competing for Jamaica, Ottey has won fourteen medals: three gold, four silver, and seven bronze medals, while at the Olympics, she has earned three silver and six bronze medals.
- Ottey was the first female Caribbean athlete to win an Olympic medal.
- Ottey has won the most career Olympic medals (9 medals: 3 silver and 6 bronze) in women's track and field, a record now shared with American sprinter Allyson Felix (6 gold and 3 silver).
- Ottey has the quickest 200 m performance ever into a headwind (-1.0 m/sec or more ) achieved when clocking 21.66 (-1.0) in Zurich, 1990.
- Ottey has won the Jamaican Sportsperson of the Year (sportswoman) a record 13 times, first winning in 1979 and last winning in 1995. No man or woman has won the award more.

== International competitions ==
Year	Competition	Venue	Position	Event	Time
Representing Jamaica
1978	CAC Junior Championships (U-20)	Xalapa, Mexico	3rd	200 m	25.34s A
1978	CAC Junior Championships (U-20)	Xalapa, Mexico	1st	4 × 100 m relay	47.12s A
1978	CAC Junior Championships (U-20)	Xalapa, Mexico	2nd	4 × 400 m relay	3:58.8 A
1979	CARIFTA Games (U-20)	Kingston, Jamaica	2nd	100 m	11.87s
1979	CARIFTA Games (U-20)	Kingston, Jamaica	2nd	200 m	24.05s
1979	CARIFTA Games (U-20)	Kingston, Jamaica	2nd	4 × 100 m relay	46.47s
1979	Pan American Games	San Juan, Puerto Rico	3rd	200 m	22.79w
1980	Olympic Games	Moscow, Soviet Union	3rd	200 m	22.20
1980	Olympic Games	Moscow, Soviet Union	6th	4 × 100 m	43.19
1980	Olympic Games	Moscow, Soviet Union	heats	4 × 400 m	3.31.5
1982	Commonwealth Games	Brisbane, Australia	2nd	100 m	11.03
1982	Commonwealth Games	Brisbane, Australia	1st	200 m	22.19w
1982	Commonwealth Games	Brisbane, Australia	3rd	4 × 100 m	43.69
1983	World Championships	Helsinki, Finland	4th	100 m	11.19
1983	World Championships	Helsinki, Finland	2nd	200 m	22.19
1983	World Championships	Helsinki, Finland	3rd	4 × 100 m	42.73
1984	Olympic Games	Los Angeles, United States	3rd	100 m	11.16
1984	Olympic Games	Los Angeles, United States	3rd	200 m	22.09
1984	Olympic Games	Los Angeles, United States	8th	4 × 100 m	53.54
1987	World Indoor Championships	Indianapolis, United States	4th	60 m	7.13
1987	World Indoor Championships	Indianapolis, United States	2nd	200 m	22.66
1987	World Championships	Rome, Italy	3rd	100 m	11.04
1987	World Championships	Rome, Italy	3rd	200 m	22.06
1988	Olympic Games	Seoul, South Korea	DNS (sf)	100 m	11.03 (qf)
1988	Olympic Games	Seoul, South Korea	4th	200 m	21.99
1988	Olympic Games	Seoul, South Korea	DNS (f)	4 × 100 m	43.30 (sf)
1989	World Indoor Championships	Budapest, Hungary	3rd	60 m	7.10
1989	World Indoor Championships	Budapest, Hungary	1st	200 m	22.34
1990	Commonwealth Games	Auckland, New Zealand	1st	100 m	11.02w
1990	Commonwealth Games	Auckland, New Zealand	1st	200 m	22.76
1991	World Indoor Championships	Seville, Spain	2nd	60 m	7.08
1991	World Indoor Championships	Seville, Spain	1st	200 m	22.24
1991	World Championships	Tokyo, Japan	3rd	100 m	11.06
1991	World Championships	Tokyo, Japan	3rd	200 m	22.21
1991	World Championships	Tokyo, Japan	1st	4 × 100 m	41.94
1992	Olympic Games	Barcelona, Spain	5th	100 m	10.88
1992	Olympic Games	Barcelona, Spain	3rd	200 m	22.09
1992	Olympic Games	Barcelona, Spain		4 × 100 m	DNF
1993	World Championships	Stuttgart, Germany	2nd	100 m	10.82
1993	World Championships	Stuttgart, Germany	1st	200 m	21.98
1993	World Championships	Stuttgart, Germany	3rd	4 × 100 m	41.94
1994	World Cup	London, United Kingdom	1st	200 m	22.23
1995	World Indoor Championships	Barcelona, Spain	1st	60 m	6.97
1995	World Championships	Gothenburg, Sweden	2nd	100 m	10.94
1995	World Championships	Gothenburg, Sweden	1st	200 m	22.12
1995	World Championships	Gothenburg, Sweden	2nd	4 × 100 m	42.25
1996	Olympic Games	Atlanta, United States	2nd	100 m	10.94
1996	Olympic Games	Atlanta, United States	2nd	200 m	22.24
1996	Olympic Games	Atlanta, United States	3rd	4 × 100 m	42.24
1997	World Championships	Athens, Greece	7th	100 m	11.29
1997	World Championships	Athens, Greece	3rd	200 m	22.40
1998	Goodwill Games	New York City, United States	4th	100 m	11.21
2000	Olympic Games	Sydney, Australia	3rd	100 m	11.19
2000	Olympic Games	Sydney, Australia	2nd	4 × 100 m	42.13
Representing Slovenia
2003	World Indoor Championships	Birmingham, United Kingdom	3rd	60 m	7.20
2003	World Championships	Paris, France	11th (sf)	100 m	11.26
2003	World Championships	Paris, France	16th (qf)	200 m	23.22
2003	World Championships	Paris, France	heats	4 × 100 m	DISQ
2004	World Indoor Championships	Budapest, Hungary	9th (sf)	60 m	7.21
2004	Olympic Games	Athens, Greece	10th (sf)	100 m	11.21
2004	Olympic Games	Athens, Greece	DNF (sf)	200 m	22.72 (h)
2006	European Championships	Gothenburg, Sweden	10th (sf)	100 m	11.44
2007	European Indoor Championships	Birmingham, United Kingdom	19th (h)	60 m	7.33
2007	World Championships	Osaka, Japan	38th (h)	100 m	11.64
2010	European Championships	Barcelona, Spain	13th (h)	4 × 100 m	44.30
2012	European Championships	Helsinki, Finland	11th (h)	4 × 100 m	44.28
(#) Indicates overall position in qualifying heats (h) quarterfinals (qf) or semifinals (sf). DNF = did not finish DNS = did not start

== See also ==
- List of athletes with the most appearances at Olympic Games
- List of multiple Summer Olympic medalists

Records
Preceded by Heike Drechsler	Women's 200 m Indoor World Record Holder; 13 February 1993 – present	Succeeded by Incumbent
Awards and achievements
Preceded by Ana Fidelia Quirot	Women's Track & Field Athlete of the Year; 1990	Succeeded by Heike Henkel
Preceded by Steffi Graf	United Press International; Athlete of the Year; 1991	Succeeded by Monica Seles
Sporting positions
Preceded by Dawn Sowell; Gwen Torrence	Women's 200 m Best Year Performance; 1990–1991; 1993	Succeeded by Gwen Torrence
Olympic Games
Preceded by Dudley Stokes	Flagbearer for Jamaica; Seoul 1988	Succeeded by Dudley Stokes
Preceded by Dudley Stokes	Flagbearer for Jamaica; Barcelona 1992	Succeeded by Chris Stokes
