= Senegal at the 2025 World Athletics Championships =

- Flag of Senegal
- WA code: SEN

in Tokyo, Japan 13 September 2025 – 21 September 2025
- Competitors: 4 (3 men and 1 woman)
- Medals: Gold 0 Silver 0 Bronze 0 Total 0

World Athletics Championships appearances
- 1983; 1987; 1991; 1993; 1995; 1997; 1999; 2001; 2003; 2005; 2007; 2009; 2011; 2013; 2015; 2017; 2019; 2022; 2023; 2025

Senegal competed at the 2025 World Athletics Championships in Tokyo, Japan, from 13 to 21 September 2025.

== Results ==
Senegal entered 4 athletes to the championships: 3 men and 1 woman.

Key

- Q = Qualified for the next round
- q = Qualified for the next round as a fastest loser or, in field events, by position without achieving the qualifying target
- NR = National record
- PB = Personal best
- SB = Season best
- N/A = Round not applicable for the event

=== Men ===
Track and road events

Athlete	Event	Heats		Semifinal		Final	
Athlete	Event	Result	Rank	Result	Rank	Result	Rank
Mamadou Fall Sarr	100 metres	10.25	7	Did not advance			
Louis François Mendy	110 metres hurdles	13.33	4 Q	Did not finish		Did not advance	

Field events

Athlete	Event	Qualification		Final	
Athlete	Event	Distance	Position	Distance	Position
Amath Faye	Triple jump	16.49	21	Did not advance	

=== Women ===
Field events

Athlete	Event	Qualification		Final	
Athlete	Event	Distance	Position	Distance	Position
Saly Sarr	Triple jump	14.21	7 q	14.55 PB	6
