= Senegal at the 2025 World Aquatics Championships =

- Flag of Senegal
- World Aquatics code: SEN
- National federation: Fédération Sénégalaise de Natation et de Sauvetage

in Singapore
- Competitors: 2 in 1 sport
- Medals: Gold 0 Silver 0 Bronze 0 Total 0

World Aquatics Championships appearances
- 1973; 1975; 1978; 1982; 1986; 1991; 1994; 1998; 2001; 2003; 2005; 2007; 2009; 2011; 2013; 2015; 2017; 2019; 2022; 2023; 2024; 2025

Senegal competed at the 2025 World Aquatics Championships in Singapore from July 11 to August 3, 2025.

== Competitors ==
The following is the list of competitors in the Championships.

Sport	Men	Women	Total
Swimming	1	1	2
Total	1	1	2

== Swimming ==
Senegal entered 2 swimmers.

Men

Athlete	Event	Heat		Semi-final		Final	
Athlete	Event	Time	Rank	Time	Rank	Time	Rank
Matthieu Seye	100 m freestyle	50.76	49	Did not advance			
Matthieu Seye	50 m butterfly	24.54	51	Did not advance			

Women

Athlete	Event	Heat		Semi-final		Final	
Athlete	Event	Time	Rank	Time	Rank	Time	Rank
Oumy Diop	50 m backstroke	29.38 NR	35	Did not advance			
Oumy Diop	50 m butterfly	27.19 NR	37	Did not advance			
