= Ghana at the World Athletics Championships =

- WA code: GHA
- National federation: Ghana Athletics Association
- Website: https://ghanaathletics.org/
- Medals: Gold 0 Silver 1 Bronze 1 Total 2

World Athletics Championships appearances (overview)
- 1983; 1987; 1991; 1993; 1995; 1997; 1999; 2001; 2003; 2005; 2007; 2009; 2011; 2013; 2015; 2017; 2019; 2022; 2023; 2025

Ghana participates regularly in the World Athletics Championships. Its first participation was in the 1983 World Championships in Athletics.

== Medalists ==
Ghana's most successful championship was the 2005 World Championships in Athletics. when it won two medals. Ignisious Gaisah was the first man to win a world medal for Ghana. He went on to win further medals for the Netherlands. Margaret Simpson was the first female to win a world medal which she did in the same championship.

Medal	Name	Year	Event
Silver	Ignisious Gaisah	2005 Helsinki	Men's long jump
Bronze	Margaret Simpson	2005 Helsinki	Women's heptathlon

== Medal tables ==
=== By championships ===
Year	Gold	Silver	Bronze	Total
2005 Helsinki	0	1	1	2
Totals (1 entries)	0	1	1	2

=== By event ===
Event	Gold	Silver	Bronze	Total
Long jump	0	1	0	1
Heptathlon	0	0	1	1
Totals (2 entries)	0	1	1	2

=== By gender ===
Gender	Gold	Silver	Bronze	Total
Men	0	1	0	1
Women	0	0	1	1

== See also ==
- Ghana at the Olympics
