= Ghana at the 2025 World Athletics Championships =

- Flag of Ghana
- WA code: GHA

in Tokyo, Japan 13 September 2025 – 21 September 2025
- Competitors: 8 (7 men and 1 woman)
- Medals: Gold 0 Silver 0 Bronze 0 Total 0

World Athletics Championships appearances (overview)
- 1983; 1987; 1991; 1993; 1995; 1997; 1999; 2001; 2003; 2005; 2007; 2009; 2011; 2013; 2015; 2017; 2019; 2022; 2023; 2025

Ghana competed at the 2025 World Athletics Championships in Tokyo, Japan, from 13 to 21 September 2025.

== Results ==
Ghana entered 8 athletes to the championships: 7 men and 1 woman..

Key

- Q = Qualified for the next round
- q = Qualified for the next round as a fastest loser or, in field events, by position without achieving the qualifying target
- NR = National record
- PB = Personal best
- SB = Season best
- N/A = Round not applicable for the event

=== Men ===
Track and road events

Athlete	Event	Heat		Semifinal		Final	
Athlete	Event	Result	Rank	Result	Rank	Result	Rank
Benjamin Azamati	100 metres	10.30	40	Did not advance			
Abdul-Rasheed Saminu	100 metres	10.09	14 Q	10.08	12	Did not advance	
Ibrahim Fuseini	200 metres	20.66	38	Did not advance			
Alex Amankwah	800 metres	1:47.12	50	Did not advance			
Joseph Amoah; Benjamin Azamati; Ibrahim Fuseini; Abdul-Rasheed Saminu	4 × 100 metres relay	37.79 NR	1 Q	—N/a		37.93	4

=== Women ===
Field events

Athlete	Event	Qualification		Final	
Athlete	Event	Distance	Position	Distance	Position
Rose Amoanimaa Yeboah	High jump	1.92	9 q	1.88	15
