= Senegal at the 2024 World Aquatics Championships =

- Flag of Senegal
- FINA code: SEN
- National federation: Fédération Sénégalaise de Natation et de Sauvetage

in Doha, Qatar
- Competitors: 3 in 1 sport
- Medals: Gold 0 Silver 0 Bronze 0 Total 0

World Aquatics Championships appearances
- 1973; 1975; 1978; 1982; 1986; 1991; 1994; 1998; 2001; 2003; 2005; 2007; 2009; 2011; 2013; 2015; 2017; 2019; 2022; 2023; 2024

Senegal competed at the 2024 World Aquatics Championships in Doha, Qatar from 2 to 18 February.

== Competitors ==
The following is the list of competitors in the Championships.

Sport	Men	Women	Total
Swimming	2	1	3
Total	2	1	3

== Swimming ==
Senegal entered 3 swimmers.

Men

Athlete	Event	Heat		Semifinal		Final	
Athlete	Event	Time	Rank	Time	Rank	Time	Rank
Steven Aimable	50 metre freestyle	23.77	57	Did not advance			
Steven Aimable	100 metre butterfly	54.23	37	Did not advance			
Matthieu Seye	100 metre freestyle	51.47	47	Did not advance			
Matthieu Seye	200 metre freestyle	1:54.16	48	Did not advance			

Women

Athlete	Event	Heat		Semifinal		Final	
Athlete	Event	Time	Rank	Time	Rank	Time	Rank
Oumy Diop	100 metre butterfly	1:03.97	33	Did not advance			
