= 1983 World Championships in Athletics – Men's 100 metres =

Men's 100 metres at the 1983 World Championships
- Venue: Helsinki Olympic Stadium
- Dates: 7 August (heats and quarter-finals); 8 August (semi-finals and final)
- Competitors: 67
- Winning time: 10.07 CR

Medalists
| gold medal | Carl Lewis | United States |
| silver medal | Calvin Smith | United States |
| bronze medal | Emmit King | United States |

The men's 100 metres at the 1983 IAAF World Championships was held at the Olympic Stadium in Helsinki, Finland on 7 and 8 August 1983. 67 athletes from 49 nations entered to the competition

== Records ==
Existing records at the start of the event.

| World Record | Calvin Smith (USA) | 9.93 | Colorado Springs, USA | July 3, 1983 |
| Championship Record | New event | | | |

== Results ==
=== Qualifying heats ===
The qualifying heats took place on 7 August, with the 67 athletes involved being split into 9 heats. The first 3 athletes in each heat ( Q ) and the next 5 fastest ( q ) qualified for the quarter-finals.

==== Heat 1 ====
| Rank | Athlete | Nation | Time | Notes |
|---|---|---|---|---|
| 1 | Luke Watson | Great Britain & N.I. | 10.64 | Q, CR |
| 2 | Valentin Atanasov | Bulgaria | 10.66 | Q |
| 3 | Lester Benjamin | Antigua and Barbuda | 10.76 | Q |
| 4 | Mohamed Purnomo | Indonesia | 10.76 | |
| 5 | Thurston Ross | Trinidad and Tobago | 11.08 | |
| 6 | Peni Bati | Fiji | 11.11 | |
| – | Şükrü Çaprazlı | Turkey | DNS | |
| | | | Wind: –1.0 m/s | |

==== Heat 2 ====
| Rank | Athlete | Nation | Time | Notes |
|---|---|---|---|---|
| 1 | Juan Núñez | Dominican Republic | 10.38 | Q, CR |
| 2 | Innocent Egbunike | Nigeria | 10.44 | Q |
| 3 | Ben Johnson | Canada | 10.45 | Q |
| 4 | Everard Samuels | Jamaica | 10.57 | q |
| 5 | Sheikh Omar Faye | Gambia | 10.76 | |
| 6 | Hwang Chian-Shin | Chinese Taipei | 10.82 | |
| 7 | John Albertie | Saint Lucia | 10.90 | |
| 8 | Joske Teabuge | Nauru | 12.20 | |
| | | | Wind: +1.8 m/s | |

==== Heat 3 ====
| Rank | Athlete | Nation | Time | Notes |
|---|---|---|---|---|
| 1 | Carl Lewis | United States | 10.34 | Q, CR |
| 2 | Cameron Sharp | Great Britain & N.I. | 10.44 | Q |
| 3 | Osvaldo Lara | Cuba | 10.47 | Q |
| 4 | Earl Haley | Guyana | 10.77 | |
| 5 | Earle Laing | Jamaica | 10.91 | |
| 6 | Pit Rapuan | Malaysia | 11.03 | |
| 7 | Vicente Daniel Ibrahim | Mozambique | 11.20 | |
| | | | Wind: +1.2 m/s | |

==== Heat 4 ====
| Rank | Athlete | Nation | Time | Notes |
|---|---|---|---|---|
| 1 | Desai Williams | Canada | 10.31 | Q, CR |
| 2 | Paul Narracott | Australia | 10.38 | Q |
| 3 | Frank Emmelmann | East Germany | 10.40 | Q |
| 4 | Jouko Hassi | Finland | 10.58 | |
| 5 | Gregory Simons | Bermuda | 10.78 | |
| 6 | Moussa Savadogo | Mali | 10.88 | |
| 7 | Alan Zammit | Malta | 11.25 | |
| 8 | José Flores | Honduras | 11.31 | |
| | | | Wind: –0.2 m/s | |

==== Heat 5 ====
| Rank | Athlete | Nation | Time | Notes |
|---|---|---|---|---|
| 1 | Calvin Smith | United States | 10.30 | Q, CR |
| 2 | Ferenc Kiss | Hungary | 10.45 | Q |
| 3 | Marian Woronin | Poland | 10.50 | Q |
| 4 | Robson da Silva | Brazil | 10.51 | q |
| 5 | Joseph Leota | Samoa | 10.92 | |
| 6 | Georges Taniel | Vanuatu | 11.02 | |
| 7 | Nguyễn Trương Hòa | Vietnam | 11.16 | |
| | | | Wind: +0.7 m/s | |

==== Heat 6 ====
| Rank | Athlete | Nation | Time | Notes |
|---|---|---|---|---|
| 1 | Pierfrancesco Pavoni | Italy | 10.33 | Q |
| 2 | Emmit King | United States | 10.41 | Q |
| 3 | Thomas Schröder | East Germany | 10.41 | Q |
| 4 | Gerrard Keating | Australia | 10.57 | q |
| 5 | Kosmas Stratos | Greece | 10.65 | |
| 6 | Christopher Madzokere | Zimbabwe | 10.84 | |
| 7 | Rubén Inácio | Angola | 10.92 | |
| | | | Wind: –0.5 m/s | |

==== Heat 7 ====
| Rank | Athlete | Nation | Time | Notes |
|---|---|---|---|---|
| 1 | Allan Wells | Great Britain & N.I. | 10.37 | Q |
| 2 | Christian Haas | West Germany | 10.39 | Q |
| 3 | Chidi Imoh | Nigeria | 10.55 | Q |
| 4 | Nikolay Sidorov | Soviet Union | 10.59 | |
| 5 | Wilfredo Almonte | Dominican Republic | 10.72 | |
| 6 | Giorgio Mautino | Peru | 10.85 | |
| 7 | Banana Jarjue | Gambia | 11.04 | |
| 8 | Trevor Davis | Anguilla | 11.53 | |
| | | | Wind: +1.8 m/s | |

==== Heat 8 ====
| Rank | Athlete | Nation | Time | Notes |
|---|---|---|---|---|
| 1 | Raymond Stewart | Jamaica | 10.22 | Q |
| 2 | Christopher Brathwaite | Trinidad and Tobago | 10.33 | Q |
| 3 | Ernest Obeng | Ghana | 10.35 | Q |
| 4 | István Tatár | Hungary | 10.45 | q |
| 5 | Harouna Pale | (Republic of Upper Volta) Upper Volta (UPV) | 10.58 | |
| 6 | Neville Hodge | U.S. Virgin Islands | 10.59 | |
| 7 | Laoui Adnan Abou | Jordan | 11.17 | |
| | | | Wind: +2.3 m/s | |

==== Heat 9 ====
| Rank | Athlete | Nation | Time | Notes |
|---|---|---|---|---|
| 1 | Leandro Peñalver | Cuba | 10.24 | Q, CR |
| 2 | Tony Sharpe | Canada | 10.31 | Q |
| 3 | Viktor Bryzgin | Soviet Union | 10.33 | Q |
| 4 | Antoine Richard | France | 10.34 | q |
| 5 | Suchart Chairsuvaparb | Thailand | 10.63 | |
| 6 | Jean-Yves Mallat | Lebanon | 11.04 | |
| 7 | Mohamad Ismail Bakaki | Afghanistan | 12.33 | |
| – | Lee Kuo-Sheng | Chinese Taipei | DNS | |
| | | | Wind: +1.3 m/s | |

=== Quarter-finals ===
The quarter-finals took place on 7 August, with the 32 athletes involved being split into 4 heats. The first 4 athletes in each heat ( Q ) qualified for the semifinals.

==== Heat 1 ====
| Rank | Athlete | Nation | Time | Notes |
|---|---|---|---|---|
| 1 | Calvin Smith | United States | 10.27 | Q |
| 2 | Tony Sharpe | Canada | 10.36 | Q |
| 3 | Paul Narracott | Australia | 10.37 | Q |
| 4 | Thomas Schröder | East Germany | 10.45 | Q |
| 5 | Ernest Obeng | Ghana | 10.51 | |
| 6 | Innocent Egbunike | Nigeria | 10.52 | |
| 7 | Luke Watson | Great Britain & N.I. | 10.57 | |
| 8 | Everard Samuels | Jamaica | 10.65 | |
| | | | Wind: +1.1 m/s | |

==== Heat 2 ====
| Rank | Athlete | Nation | Time | Notes |
|---|---|---|---|---|
| 1 | Carl Lewis | United States | 10.20 | Q, CR |
| 2 | Raymond Stewart | Jamaica | 10.37 | Q |
| 3 | Cameron Sharp | Great Britain & N.I. | 10.41 | Q |
| 4 | Frank Emmelmann | East Germany | 10.46 | Q |
| 5 | Christopher Brathwaite | Trinidad and Tobago | 10.57 | |
| 6 | Robson da Silva | Brazil | 10.66 | |
| 7 | Marian Woronin | Poland | 10.72 | |
| 8 | Lester Benjamin | Antigua and Barbuda | 10.86 | |
| | | | Wind: +0.8 m/s | |

==== Heat 3 ====
| Rank | Athlete | Nation | Time | Notes |
|---|---|---|---|---|
| 1 | Desai Williams | Canada | 10.31 | Q |
| 2 | Allan Wells | Great Britain & N.I. | 10.37 | Q |
| 3 | Juan Núñez | Dominican Republic | 10.39 | Q |
| 4 | Osvaldo Lara | Cuba | 10.44 | Q |
| 5 | Chidi Imoh | Nigeria | 10.45 | |
| 6 | Viktor Bryzhin | Soviet Union | 10.55 | |
| 7 | Gerrard Keating | Australia | 10.59 | |
| 8 | István Tatár | Hungary | 10.65 | |
| | | | Wind: –1.1 m/s | |

==== Heat 4 ====
| Rank | Athlete | Nation | Time | Notes |
|---|---|---|---|---|
| 1 | Emmit King | United States | 10.30 | Q |
| 2 | Christian Haas | West Germany | 10.36 | Q |
| 3 | Leandro Peñalver | Cuba | 10.38 | Q |
| 4 | Ben Johnson | Canada | 10.40 | Q |
| 5 | Pierfrancesco Pavoni | Italy | 10.44 | |
| 6 | Antoine Richard | France | 10.44 | |
| 7 | Ferenc Kiss | Hungary | 10.53 | |
| 8 | Valentin Atanasov | Bulgaria | 10.63 | |
| | | | Wind: –1.2 m/s | |

=== Semi-finals ===
The semi-finals took place on 8 August, with the 16 athletes involved being split into 2 heats. The first 4 athletes in each heat ( Q ) qualified for the final.

==== Heat 1 ====
| Rank | Athlete | Nation | Time | Notes |
|---|---|---|---|---|
| 1 | Calvin Smith | United States | 10.22 | Q |
| 2 | Allan Wells | Great Britain & N.I. | 10.35 | Q |
| 3 | Juan Núñez | Dominican Republic | 10.36 | Q |
| 4 | Emmit King | United States | 10.36 | Q |
| 5 | Frank Emmelmann | East Germany | 10.40 | |
| 6 | Ben Johnson | Canada | 10.44 | |
| 7 | Tony Sharpe | Canada | 10.44 | |
| 8 | Leandro Peñalver | Cuba | 10.47 | |
| | | | Wind: –0.8 m/s | |

==== Heat 2 ====
| Rank | Athlete | Nation | Time | Notes |
|---|---|---|---|---|
| 1 | Carl Lewis | United States | 10.28 | Q |
| 2 | Paul Narracott | Australia | 10.38 | Q |
| 3 | Desai Williams | Canada | 10.39 | Q |
| 4 | Christian Haas | West Germany | 10.39 | Q |
| 5 | Raymond Stewart | Jamaica | 10.40 | |
| 6 | Cameron Sharp | Great Britain & N.I. | 10.43 | |
| 7 | Osvaldo Lara | Cuba | 10.46 | |
| 8 | Thomas Schröder | East Germany | 10.52 | |
| | | | Wind: –1.0 m/s | |

=== Final ===
The final took place on August 8.

| Rank | Athlete | Nation | Time | Notes |
|---|---|---|---|---|
| 1st place, gold medalist(s) | Carl Lewis | United States | 10.07 | CR |
| 2nd place, silver medalist(s) | Calvin Smith | United States | 10.21 | |
| 3rd place, bronze medalist(s) | Emmit King | United States | 10.24 | |
| 4 | Allan Wells | Great Britain & N.I. | 10.27 | |
| 5 | Juan Núñez | Dominican Republic | 10.29 | |
| 6 | Christian Haas | West Germany | 10.32 | |
| 7 | Paul Narracott | Australia | 10.33 | |
| 8 | Desai Williams | Canada | 10.36 | |
| | | | Wind: –0.3 m/s | |
