= Nigeria at the 2017 World Championships in Athletics =

- WA code: NGR
- Website: www.athleticsnigeria.org

in London
- Competitors: 18
- Medals: Gold 0 Silver 0 Bronze 0 Total 0

World Championships in Athletics appearances
- 1983; 1987; 1991; 1993; 1995; 1997; 1999; 2001; 2003; 2005; 2007; 2009; 2011; 2013; 2015; 2017; 2019; 2022; 2023; 2025

Nigeria competed at the 2017 World Championships in Athletics in London, Great Britain, from 4–13 August 2017.

== Results ==
(q – qualified, NM – no mark, SB – season best)

=== Men ===
Track and road events

Athlete	Event	Heat		Semifinal		Final	
Athlete	Event	Result	Rank	Result	Rank	Result	Rank
Samson Oghenewegba Nathaniel	400 metres	46.63	41	Did not advance			
Edose Ibadin	800 metres	1:46.51	20	Did not advance			

Field events

Athlete	Event	Qualification		Final	
Athlete	Event	Distance	Position	Distance	Position
Tosin Oke	Triple jump	16.17	25	Did not advance	
Chukwuebuka Enekwechi	Shot put	19.72	25	Did not advance	

=== Women ===
Track and road events

Athlete	Event	Heat		Semifinal		Final	
Athlete	Event	Result	Rank	Result	Rank	Result	Rank
Blessing Okagbare	100 metres	11.22	17 Q	11.08	9	Did not advance	
Yinka Ajayi	400 metres	51.58	14 Q	52.10	19	Did not advance	
Margaret Bamgbose	400 metres	51.57 SB	13 Q	52.23	20	Did not advance	
Patience Okon George	400 metres	51.83	17 Q	52.60	21	Did not advance	
Oluwatobiloba Amusan	100 metres hurdles	12.97	14 Q	13.04	14	Did not advance	
Lindsay Lindley	100 metres hurdles	13.07	20 q	13.18	20	Did not advance	
Glory Onome Nathaniel	400 metres hurdles	55.30 PB	9 Q	DQ	–	Did not advance	
Aniekeme Alphonsus; Wisdom Isoken; Lindsay Lindley; Jennifer Madu; Blessing Okagbare; Maria Thompson Omokwe	4 × 100 metres relay	DNS	–	—N/a		Did not advance	
Patience Okon George; Abike Funmilola Egbeniyi; Glory Onome Nathaniel; Yinka Ajayi; Emerald Egwim*	4 × 400 metres relay	3:25.40 SB	4 Q	—N/a		3:26.72	5

* – Indicates the athlete competed in preliminaries but not the final

Field events

Athlete	Event	Qualification		Final	
Athlete	Event	Distance	Position	Distance	Position
Ese Brume	Long jump	6.38	17	Did not advance	
Blessing Okagbare	Long jump	6.51	8 q	6.55	8
