= Senegal at the 2017 World Aquatics Championships =

- Flag of Senegal
- World Aquatics code: SEN
- National federation: Federation Senegalaise de Natation et de Sauvetage

in Budapest, Hungary
- Competitors: 6 in 2 sports
- Medals: Gold 0 Silver 0 Bronze 0 Total 0

World Aquatics Championships appearances
- 1973; 1975; 1978; 1982; 1986; 1991; 1994; 1998; 2001; 2003; 2005; 2007; 2009; 2011; 2013; 2015; 2017; 2019; 2022; 2023; 2024; 2025

Senegal is scheduled to compete at the 2017 World Aquatics Championships in Budapest, Hungary from 14 July to 30 July.

== Open water swimming ==
Senegal has entered one open water swimmer

Athlete	Event	Time	Rank
Amadou N'diaye	Men's 5 km	1:03:31.1	59

== Swimming ==
Senegal has received a Universality invitation from FINA to send a maximum of four swimmers (two men and two women) to the World Championships.

Athlete	Event	Heat		Semifinal		Final	
Athlete	Event	Time	Rank	Time	Rank	Time	Rank
Adama Thiaw N'dir	Men's 50 m backstroke	DNS		Did not advance			
Adama Thiaw N'dir	Men's 100 m breaststroke	DNS		Did not advance			
Abdoul Niane	Men's 50 m freestyle	23.92	76	Did not advance			
Abdoul Niane	Men's 50 m breaststroke	30.31	60	Did not advance			
Adama Niane	Men's 50 m freestyle	DNS		Did not advance			
Adama Niane	Men's 100 m freestyle	DNS		Did not advance			
Jeanne Boutbien	Women's 50 m freestyle	28.25	59	Did not advance			
Jeanne Boutbien	Women's 100 m freestyle	1:01.30	64	Did not advance			
Fatou Bintou Diagne	Women's 50 m breaststroke	DNS		Did not advance			
Fatou Bintou Diagne	Women's 50 m butterfly	DNS		Did not advance			
