= Ghana at the 1987 World Championships in Athletics =

Ghana at the 1987 World Athletics Championships
- WA code: GHA
- National federation: Ghana Athletics Association
- Website: https://ghanaathletics.org/

28 August 1987 – 6 September 1987
- Competitors: 9 (5 men and 4 women)
- Medals: Gold 0 Silver 0 Bronze 0 Total 0

World Athletics Championships appearances (overview)
- 1983; 1987; 1991; 1993; 1995; 1997; 1999; 2001; 2003; 2005; 2007; 2009; 2011; 2013; 2015; 2017; 2019; 2022; 2023; 2025

Ghana took part in the 1987 World Championships in Athletics held in Rome, Italy.

== Results ==
9 athletes competed for Ghana. There were 5 men and 4 ladies.

=== Men ===
Track and road events

Athlete	Event	Heat		Quarter-final		Semi-final		Final	
Athlete	Event	Result	Rank	Result	Rank	Result	Rank	Result	Rank
Eric Akogyiram	100 metres	10.37	14	10.31	7	10.40	12	Did not advance	
Nelson Boateng	200 metres	21.19	29	DNS	—	Did not advance			
John Myles-Mills Emmanuel Tuffour; Salaam Gariba; Eric Akogyiram	4 x 100 m relay	—	—	39.77	12	39.94	14	Did not advance	

=== Women ===
Track and road events

Athlete	Event	Heat		Semi-final		Final	
Athlete	Event	Result	Rank	Result	Rank	Result	Rank
Mercy Addy	400 metres	54.13	25	Did not advance			
Diana Yankey	100 metres hurdles	13.90	23	Did not advance			
Mercy Addy Diana Yankey; Cynthia Quartey; Martha Appiah	4 × 400 metres relay	44.28	11	Did not advance			
