= Quow =

Quow is a surname. Notable people with the surname include:

- Elliott Quow (born 1962), American athlete
- Renny Quow (born 1987), Trinidadian athlete
- Trevor Quow (born 1960), English footballer
