= Senegal at the 2023 World Aquatics Championships =

- Flag of Senegal
- FINA code: SEN
- National federation: Fédération Sénégalaise de Natation et de Sauvetage

in Fukuoka, Japan
- Competitors: 4 in 2 sports
- Medals: Gold 0 Silver 0 Bronze 0 Total 0

World Aquatics Championships appearances
- 1973; 1975; 1978; 1982; 1986; 1991; 1994; 1998; 2001; 2003; 2005; 2007; 2009; 2011; 2013; 2015; 2017; 2019; 2022; 2023; 2024

Senegal is set to compete at the 2023 World Aquatics Championships in Fukuoka, Japan from 14 to 30 July.

== Open water swimming ==
Senegal entered 1 open water swimmer.

Men

| Athlete | Event | Time | Rank |
|---|---|---|---|
| Ousseynou Diop | Men's 5 km | OTL | |

== Swimming ==
Senegal entered 3 swimmers.

Men

| Athlete | Event | Heat | | Semifinal | | Final | |
| Athlete | Event | Time | Rank | Time | Rank | Time | Rank |
|---|---|---|---|---|---|---|---|
| Steven Aimable | 100 metre freestyle | 51.96 | 70 | Did not advance | | | |
| Steven Aimable | 100 metre butterfly | 53.98 | 46 | Did not advance | | | |
| Matthieu Seye | 100 metre backstroke | 58.59 | 54 | Did not advance | | | |
| Matthieu Seye | 200 metre backstroke | 2:08.44 | 36 | Did not advance | | | |

Women

| Athlete | Event | Heat | | Semifinal | | Final | |
| Athlete | Event | Time | Rank | Time | Rank | Time | Rank |
|---|---|---|---|---|---|---|---|
| Oumy Diop | 50 metre butterfly | 27.86 | 37 | Did not advance | | | |
| Oumy Diop | 100 metre butterfly | 1:03.14 | 40 | Did not advance | | | |
