= Ghana at the 1991 World Championships in Athletics =

Ghana at the 1991 World Athletics Championships
- WA code: GHA
- National federation: Ghana Athletics Association
- Website: https://ghanaathletics.org/

23 August 1991 – 1 September 1991
- Competitors: 5 (5 men and 0 women)
- Medals: Gold 0 Silver 0 Bronze 0 Total 0

World Athletics Championships appearances (overview)
- 1983; 1987; 1991; 1993; 1995; 1997; 1999; 2001; 2003; 2005; 2007; 2009; 2011; 2013; 2015; 2017; 2019; 2022; 2023; 2025

Ghana took part in the 1991 World Championships in Athletics held in Tokyo, Japan.

== Results ==
5 athletes competed for Ghana in Tokyo. There were no female competitors.

=== Men ===
Track and road events

Athlete	Event	Heat		Quarter-final		Semi-final		Final	
Athlete	Event	Result	Rank	Result	Rank	Result	Rank	Result	Rank
Salaam Gariba	100 metres	10.38	16	10.43	25	10.37	15	Did not advance	
Emmanuel Tuffour	100 metres	10.36	15	10.19	12	Did not advance			
Emmanuel Tuffour	200 metres	20.50	4	20.58	12	20.91	14	Did not advance	
Tim Hesse	400 metres	DQ	—	Did not advance					
John Myles-Mills Eric Akogyiram; Salaam Gariba; Emmanuel Tuffour	4 x 100 m relay	—	—	39.55	13	Did not advance			
