= 1983 World Championships in Athletics – Men's 200 metres =

Men's 200 metres at the 1983 World Championships
- Venue: Helsinki Olympic Stadium
- Dates: 13 August (heats and quarter-finals); 14 August (semi-finals and final)
- Competitors: 57
- Winning time: 20.14 CR

Medalists
gold medal	Calvin Smith	United States
silver medal	Elliott Quow	United States
bronze medal	Pietro Mennea	Italy

These are the official results of the men's 200 metres event at the 1983 IAAF World Championships in Helsinki, Finland. There were a total number of 57 participating athletes, with eight qualifying heats and the final held on 14 August 1983.

At 22 years, 218 days old, gold medallist Smith was the youngest ever world champion for the men's 200 metres until 2019, when Noah Lyles, aged 22 years and 75 days, won the 2019 title.

== Records ==
Existing records at the start of the event.

World Record	Pietro Mennea (ITA)	19.72	Mexico City, Mexico	September 12, 1979
Championship Record	New event			

== Results ==
=== Qualifying heats ===
The qualifying heats took place on 12 August, with the 57 athletes involved being split into 8 heats. The first 3 athletes in each heat ( Q ) and the next 8 fastest ( q ) qualified for the quarter-finals.

Heat 1 (wind +1.8 m/s)

Rank	Name	Nationality	Time	Notes
1	Frank Emmelmann	East Germany	20.95	Q, CR
2	Cameron Sharp	Great Britain & N.I.	21.07	Q
3	Bruce Frayne	Australia	21.15	Q
4	Christopher Brathwaite	Trinidad and Tobago	21.24	q
5	Hector Daley	Panama	21.49	q
6	Earl Haley	Guyana	21.55	q
7	Moussa Savadogo	Mali	22.33	
8	Awudu Nuhu	Ghana	22.93	

Heat 2 (wind +1.8 m/s)

Rank	Name	Nationality	Time	Notes
1	Pietro Mennea	Italy	20.80	Q, CR
2	Sergey Sokolov	Soviet Union	20.94	Q
3	Paul Narracott	Australia	21.08	Q
4	Luis Schneider	Chile	21.23	q
5	Giorgio Mautino	Peru	21.78	
6	Hoa Nguyen Truong	Vietnam	22.68	
7	Gervais Kirolo	Central African Republic	23.10	

Heat 3 (wind +0.7 m/s)

Rank	Name	Nationality	Time	Notes
1	João Batista da Silva	Brazil	20.93	Q
2	Vladimir Muravyov	Soviet Union	21.12	Q
3	Desai Williams	Canada	21.36	Q
4	Mohamed Purnomo	Indonesia	21.88	
5	Joseph Leota	Samoa	22.33	
6	Nagib Salem Ahmed	Yemen	23.22	
7	Colin Bradford	Jamaica	24.15	

Heat 4 (wind +1.1 m/s)

Rank	Name	Nationality	Time	Notes
1	Carlo Simionato	Italy	20.76	Q, CR
2	Elliott Quow	United States	21.01	Q
3	Atlee Mahorn	Canada	21.14	Q
4	Angel Heras	Spain	21.29	q
5	Roland Jokl	Austria	21.30	q
6	David Sawyerr	Sierra Leone	22.23	
7	John Albertie	Saint Lucia	22.53	

Heat 5 (wind –2.1 m/s)

Rank	Name	Nationality	Time	Notes
1	Allan Wells	Great Britain & N.I.	21.14	Q
2	Boubacar Diallo	Senegal	21.17	Q
3	Christopher Madzokere	Zimbabwe	21.68	Q
4	Dean Greenaway	British Virgin Islands	22.24	
	Juan Núñez	Dominican Republic		DNS
	Pierfrancesco Pavoni	Italy		DNS
	Tony Sharpe	Canada		DNS

Heat 6 (wind +0.4 m/s)

Rank	Name	Nationality	Time	Notes
1	Calvin Smith	United States	21.10	Q
2	Leroy Reid	Jamaica	21.13	Q
3	Patrick Barré	France	21.34	Q
4	Jae-Keun Chang	South Korea	21.39	q
5	Gustavo Capart	Argentina	21.66	
6	Rubén Inácio	Angola	22.33	
7	Trevor Davis	Anguilla	22.80	

Heat 7 (wind –1.1 m/s)

Rank	Name	Nationality	Time	Notes
1	Innocent Egbunike	Nigeria	21.28	
2	István Nagy	Hungary	21.50	
3	Andreas Rizzi	West Germany	21.51	
4	Oumar Fye	Gambia	22.30	
5	Sikendar Iqbal	Pakistan	22.91	
	Peni Bati	Fiji		DNS
	Don Quarrie	Jamaica		DNS

Heat 8 (wind +1.3 m/s)

Rank	Name	Nationality	Time	Notes
1	Jean-Jacques Boussemart	France	20.99	Q
2	Luke Watson	Great Britain & N.I.	21.20	Q
3	Alfred Nyambane	Kenya	21.21	Q
4	Neville Hodge	U.S. Virgin Islands	21.38	q
5	Larry Myricks	United States	21.74	
6	Georges Taniel	Vanuatu	22.28	
7	José Flores	Honduras	22.94	

=== Quarterfinals ===
The qualifying heats took place on 12 August, with the 32 athletes involved being split into 4 heats. The first 4 athletes in each heat ( Q ) qualified for the semifinals.

Heat 1 (wind +2.1 m/s)

Rank	Name	Nationality	Time	Notes
1	Calvin Smith	United States	20.60w	Q
2	João Batista da Silva	Brazil	20.65w	Q
3	Allan Wells	Great Britain & N.I.	20.81w	Q
4	Jean-Jacques Boussemart	France	20.86w	Q
5	Ángel Heras	Spain	21.25w	
6	Earl Haley	Guyana	21.39w	
7	Luis Schneider	Chile	21.39w	
	Jae-Keun Chang	South Korea		DNF

Heat 2 (wind –1.6 m/s)

Rank	Name	Nationality	Time	Notes
1	Carlo Simionato	Italy	20.75	Q, CR
2.	Desai Williams	Canada	20.87	Q
3.	Boubacar Diallo	Senegal	20.97	Q
4.	Cameron Sharp	Great Britain & N.I.	20.99	Q
5.	Patrick Barré	France	21.12	
6.	Paul Narracott	Australia	21.34	
7.	Alfred Nyambane	Kenya	21.55	
8.	Christopher Madzokere	Zimbabwe	21.55	

Heat 3 (wind –0.4 m/s)

Rank	Name	Nationality	Time	Notes
1	Frank Emmelmann	East Germany	20.78	Q
2	Leroy Reid	Jamaica	20.88	Q
3	Innocent Egbunike	Nigeria	20.91	Q
4	Sergey Sokolov	Soviet Union	20.93	Q
5	Atlee Mahorn	Canada	21.13	
6	Christopher Brathwaite	Trinidad and Tobago	21.14	
7	Andreas Rizzi	West Germany	21.37	
8	István Nagy	Hungary	21.52	

Heat 4 (wind +1.6 m/s)

Rank	Name	Nationality	Time	Notes
1	Pietro Mennea	Italy	20.68	Q, CR
2	Vladimir Muravyov	Soviet Union	20.70	Q
3	Elliott Quow	United States	20.80	Q
4	Bruce Frayne	Australia	20.97	Q
5	Luke Watson	Great Britain & N.I.	20.99	
6	Roland Jokl	Austria	21.24	
7	Neville Hodge	U.S. Virgin Islands	21.38	
	Hector Daley	Panama		DNS

=== Semifinals ===
The semifinals took place on 13 August, with the 16 athletes involved being split into 2 heats. The first 4 athletes in each heat ( Q ) qualified for the final.

Heat 1 (wind +3.4 m/s)

Rank	Name	Nationality	Time	Notes
1	João Batista da Silva	Brazil	20.56w	Q
2	Frank Emmelmann	East Germany	20.63w	Q
3	Pietro Mennea	Italy	20.68w	Q
4	Elliott Quow	United States	20.69w	Q
5	Cameron Sharp	Great Britain & N.I.	20.69w	
6	Desai Williams	Canada	20.71w	
7	Leroy Reid	Jamaica	20.89w	
8	Sergey Sokolov	Soviet Union	20.89w	

Heat 2 (wind +1.4 m/s)

Rank	Name	Nationality	Time	Notes
1	Calvin Smith	United States	20.29	Q, CR
2	Carlo Simionato	Italy	20.60	Q
3	Innocent Egbunike	Nigeria	20.63	Q
4	Allan Wells	Great Britain & N.I.	20.63	Q
5	Vladimir Muravyov	Soviet Union	20.71	
6	Jean-Jacques Boussemart	France	20.76	
7	Bruce Frayne	Australia	20.94	
8	Boubacar Diallo	Senegal	20.96	

=== Final ===
The final took place on August 14. Wind: +1.2 m/s

Rank	Lane	Name	Nationality	Time	Notes
1st place, gold medalist(s)	3	Calvin Smith	United States	20.14	CR
2nd place, silver medalist(s)	6	Elliott Quow	United States	20.41	
3rd place, bronze medalist(s)	5	Pietro Mennea	Italy	20.51	
4	4	Allan Wells	Great Britain & N.I.	20.52	
5	7	Frank Emmelmann	East Germany	20.55	
6	2	Innocent Egbunike	Nigeria	20.63	
7	1	Carlo Simionato	Italy	20.69	
8	8	João Batista da Silva	Brazil	20.80	
