= Fiji at the 2023 World Athletics Championships =

- Flag of Fiji
- WA code: FIJ

in Budapest, Hungary 19 August 2023 – 27 August 2023
- Competitors: 1 (0 men and 1 woman)
- Medals: Gold 0 Silver 0 Bronze 0 Total 0

World Athletics Championships appearances
- 1983; 1987; 1991; 1993; 1995; 1997; 1999; 2001; 2003; 2005; 2007; 2009; 2011; 2013; 2015; 2017; 2019; 2022; 2023; 2025

Fiji competed at the 2023 World Athletics Championships in Budapest, Hungary, which were held from 19 to 27 August 2023. The athlete delegation of the country was composed of one competitor, sprinter Kesaia Boletakanakandavu who competed in the women's 100 metres. She qualified for the Championships upon being selected by Athletics Fiji. In the preliminary heats, she placed last in he heat though set a personal best with 12.46 seconds.

== Background ==
The 2023 World Athletics Championships in Budapest, Hungary, were held from 19 to 27 August 2023. The Championships were held at the National Athletics Centre. To qualify for the World Championships, athletes had to reach an entry standard (e.g. time or distance), place in a specific position at select competitions, be a wild card entry, or qualify through their World Athletics Ranking at the end of the qualification period.

As Fiji did not meet any of the four standards, they could send either one male or one female athlete in one event of the Championships who has not yet qualified. Athletics Fiji selected sprinter Kesaia Boletakanakandavu, who would compete in the women's 100 metres. At the time of her selection, she was unranked in her event. This was also her first competition outside of Fiji. Previously, she had competed in Fiji's trials for the 2023 Pacific Games and placed first in the women's 100 metres with a time of 13.12 seconds. Her personal best at a local level was 12.25 seconds.

== Results ==
Key

- Q = Qualified for the next round
- q = Qualified for the next round as a fastest loser or, in field events, by position without achieving the qualifying target
- NR = National record
- PB = Personal best
- SB = Season best
- N/A = Round not applicable for the event

=== Women ===
Boletakanakandavu competed in the fourth preliminary heat of the women's 100 metres on 20 August against seven other sprinters. There, she recorded an international personal best time of 12.46 seconds and placed last in her heat, failing to advance further as only the top three of each heat and the three next fastest would only be able to do so.

Track and road events

Athlete	Event	Heat		Semifinal		Final	
Athlete	Event	Result	Rank	Result	Rank	Result	Rank
Kesaia Boletakanakandavu	100 metres	12.46 PB	8	Did not advance			
