= Senegal at the 2022 World Aquatics Championships =

- Flag of Senegal
- FINA code: SEN
- National federation: Senegalese Swimming and Rescue Federation

in Budapest, Hungary
- Competitors: 3 in 2 sports
- Medals: Gold 0 Silver 0 Bronze 0 Total 0

World Aquatics Championships appearances
- 1973; 1975; 1978; 1982; 1986; 1991; 1994; 1998; 2001; 2003; 2005; 2007; 2009; 2011; 2013; 2015; 2017; 2019; 2022; 2023; 2024

Senegal competed at the 2022 World Aquatics Championships in Budapest, Hungary from 18 June to 3 July.

== Open water swimming ==
Athlete	Event	Time	Rank
Ousseynou Diop	Men's 5 km	OTL	

== Swimming ==
Athlete	Event	Heat		Semifinal		Final	
Athlete	Event	Time	Rank	Time	Rank	Time	Rank
Steven Aimable	Men's 100 m freestyle	52.80	69	did not advance			
Steven Aimable	Men's 100 m butterfly	54.65	43	did not advance			
Oumy Diop	Women's 100 m freestyle	59.53	38	did not advance			
Oumy Diop	Women's 50 m butterfly	27.89	39	did not advance			
