= Ghana at the 2007 World Championships in Athletics =

Ghana at the 2007 World Athletics Championships
- WA code: GHA
- National federation: Ghana Athletics Association
- Website: https://ghanaathletics.org/

24 August 2007 – 2 September 2007
- Competitors: 3 (1 man and 2 women) in Athletics sports
- Medals: Gold 0 Silver 0 Bronze 0 Total 0

World Athletics Championships appearances (overview)
- 1983; 1987; 1991; 1993; 1995; 1997; 1999; 2001; 2003; 2005; 2007; 2009; 2011; 2013; 2015; 2017; 2019; 2022; 2023; 2025

== Results ==
=== Qualification rounds ===
('Q': Automatic Qualifier, 'q': Fastest Loser Qualifier, '-': Did not start, 'DNS', Did not qualify, 'DQ' - Disqualified, 'n/a' Not applicable SB: Season's Best, PB: Personal Best)

=== Men ===
Track and road events

Athlete	Event	Heat		Quarter-final		Semi-final		Final	
Athlete	Event	Result	Rank	Result	Rank	Result	Rank	Result	Rank
Seth Amoo	200 metres	20.85	30	Did not advance					

=== Women ===
Track and road events

Athlete	Event	Heat		Quarter-final		Semi-final		Final	
Athlete	Event	Result	Rank	Result	Rank	Result	Rank	Result	Rank
Vida Anim	100 metres	11.22 SB	9	11.36	20	Did not advance			
Vida Anim	200 metres	23.16	18	23.47	26	Did not advance			
Margaret Simpson	heptathlon	DNF	—	—					

In the women's heptathlon, Margaret Simpson, who was the bronze medalist at the 2005 World Championships in Athletics, withdrew after the first two events. In the first event, the 100 metres hurdles, her time was 13.69 seconds (1023 points). Following this, she managed 1.74m in the High jump. She was unable to continue with the Shot putt event and abandoned the competition altogether.

== Competitors ==
=== Men ===
200m: Seth Amoo

=== Women ===
100 m: Vida Anim
200 m: Vida Anim
Heptathlon: Margaret Simpson

== Sources ==
- IAAF:Results by events
