= Mali at the 1983 World Championships in Athletics =

- Flag of Mali
- WA code: MLI

in Helsinki, Finland August 7–14, 1983
- Competitors: 3 (1 man and 2 women) in 4 events
- Medals: Gold 0 Silver 0 Bronze 0 Total 0

World Championships in Athletics appearances
- 1983; 1987; 1991; 1993; 1995; 1997; 1999; 2001; 2003; 2005; 2007; 2009; 2011; 2013; 2015; 2017; 2019; 2022; 2023

Mali competed at the 1983 World Championships in Athletics in Helsinki, Finland, from August 7 to 14, 1983.

== Men ==
Track and road events

Athlete	Event	Heat		Quarterfinal		Semifinal		Final	
Athlete	Event	Result	Rank	Result	Rank	Result	Rank	Result	Rank
Moussa Savadogo	100 metres	10.88	47	Did not advance					
Moussa Savadogo	200 metres	22.33	41	Did not advance					

== Women ==
Track and road events

Athlete	Event	Heat		Quarterfinal		Semifinal		Final	
Athlete	Event	Result	Rank	Result	Rank	Result	Rank	Result	Rank
Moussa Savadogo	400 metres	59.37	29 q	Did not start		Did not advance			
Fatalmoudou Touré	800 metres	DQ		—		Did not advance			
