= Nigeria at the 1983 World Championships in Athletics =

- Flag of Nigeria
- WA code: NGR

in Helsinki, Finland August 7–14, 1983
- Competitors: 9 (8 men and 1 woman) in 9 events
- Medals Ranked =21st: Gold 0 Silver 0 Bronze 1 Total 1

World Championships in Athletics appearances
- 1983; 1987; 1991; 1993; 1995; 1997; 1999; 2001; 2003; 2005; 2007; 2009; 2011; 2013; 2015; 2017; 2019; 2022; 2023

Nigeria competed at the 1983 World Championships in Athletics in Helsinki, Finland, from August 7 to 14, 1983.

== Medalists ==
Medal	Athlete	Event
Bronze	Ajayi Agbebaku	Triple jump

== Results ==
=== Men ===
Track and road events

Athlete	Event	Heat		Quarterfinal		Semifinal		Final	
Athlete	Event	Result	Rank	Result	Rank	Result	Rank	Result	Rank
Chidi Imoh	100 metres	10.55	27 Q	10.45	17	Did not advance			
Innocent Egbunike	100 metres	10.44	19 Q	10.52	21	Did not advance			
Innocent Egbunike	200 metres	21.28	21 Q	20.91	12 Q	20.63	6 Q	20.63	6
Sunday Uti	400 metres	Disqualified		Did not advance					
Daniel Ogidi	400 metres hurdles	50.44	=9 Q	—		49.51	8	Did not advance	
Innocent Egbunike; Ikpoto Eseme; Samson Oyeledun; Chidi Imoh	4 × 100 metres relay	39.62	12 Q	—		39.44	10	Did not advance	

Field events

Athlete	Event	Qualification		Final	
Athlete	Event	Distance	Position	Distance	Position
Yusuf Alli	Long jump	8.11	4 Q	7.89	8
Ajayi Agbebaku	Triple jump	16.80	2 Q	17.18	3rd place, bronze medalist(s)

=== Women ===
Track and road events

Athlete	Event	Heat		Quarterfinal		Semifinal		Final	
Athlete	Event	Result	Rank	Result	Rank	Result	Rank	Result	Rank
Rufina Ubah	100 metres	11.67	28 q	11.60	19	Did not advance			
Rufina Ubah	200 metres	24.12w	26 q	24.72	28	Did not advance			
