= Senegal at the 2007 World Championships in Athletics =

Senegal at the 2007 World Athletics Championships
- WA code: SEN
- National federation: Fédération Sénégalaise d'Athlétisme
- Website: https://fedesa.sn/
- Competitors: 3 (2 men and 1 woman) in Athletics sports
- Medals: Gold 0 Silver 0 Bronze 0 Total 0

World Athletics Championships appearances
- 1983; 1987; 1991; 1993; 1995; 1997; 1999; 2001; 2003; 2005; 2007; 2009; 2011; 2013; 2015; 2017; 2019; 2022; 2023; 2025

Senegal competed at the 2007 World Championships in Athletics.

== Competitors ==
=== Men ===
800 m: Abdoulaye Wagne
Triple Jump: Ndiss Kaba Badji
Long Jump: Ndiss Kaba Badji

=== Women ===
400 m: Amy Mbacké Thiam

== Results ==
=== Qualification rounds ===
('Q': Automatic Qualifier, 'q': Fastest Loser Qualifier, '-': Did not start, 'DNS', Did not qualify, 'DQ' - Disqualified, 'n/a' Not applicable SB: Season's Best, PB: Personal Best)

=== Men ===
Track and road events

Athlete	Event	Heat		Quarter-final		Semi-final		Final	
Athlete	Event	Result	Rank	Result	Rank	Result	Rank	Result	Rank
Abdoulaye Wagne	800 metres	1:46.20	24	—N/a		1:46.49	18	Did not advance	

==== Field events ====
Event	Athletes	Qualification		Final	
Event	Athletes	Result	Rank	Result	Rank
Ndiss Kaba Badji	Triple jump	DNS	—N/a	Did not advance	
Ndiss Kaba Badji	Long jump	9.04 m	5	8.01 m	7

=== Women ===
Track and road events

Athlete	Event	Heat		Quarter-final		Semi-final		Final	
Athlete	Event	Result	Rank	Result	Rank	Result	Rank	Result	Rank
Amy Mbacké Thiam	400 metres	54.31	38	Did not advance					
