= Fiji at the 2019 World Athletics Championships =

Fiji at the 2019 World Championships in Athletics
- Flag of Fiji
- WA code: FIJ
- National federation: Athletics Fiji
- Website: www.athleticsfiji.com

in Doha, Qatar 27 September 2019
- Competitors: 1 (1 man) in 1 event
- Medals: Gold 0 Silver 0 Bronze 0 Total 0

World Championships in Athletics appearances
- 1983; 1987; 1991; 1993; 1995; 1997; 1999; 2001; 2003; 2005; 2007; 2009; 2011; 2013; 2015; 2017; 2019; 2022; 2023

Fiji competed at the 2019 World Championships in Athletics in Doha, Qatar, from 27 September 2019.

== Results ==
=== Men ===
Track and road events

Athlete	Event	Preliminary Round		Heat		Semifinal		Final	
Athlete	Event	Result	Rank	Result	Rank	Result	Rank	Result	Rank
Banuve Tabakaucoro	100 metres	10.56	6	10.56	43	Did not advance			
