= Ghana at the 2003 World Championships in Athletics =

Ghana at the 2003 World Athletics Championships
- WA code: GHA
- National federation: Ghana Athletics Association
- Website: https://ghanaathletics.org/

23 August 2003 – 31 August 2003
- Competitors: 10 (7 men and 3 women)
- Medals Ranked 24th: Gold 0 Silver 0 Bronze 0 Total 0

World Athletics Championships appearances (overview)
- 1983; 1987; 1991; 1993; 1995; 1997; 1999; 2001; 2003; 2005; 2007; 2009; 2011; 2013; 2015; 2017; 2019; 2022; 2023; 2025

Ghana was one of the countries that competed in the 2003 World Championships in Athletics held in the streets of Paris and the Stade de France in Saint-Denis, Seine-Saint-Denis, France.

== Results ==
10 athletes competed for Ghana. There were 7 men and 3 ladies.

=== Men ===
Track and road events

| Athlete | Event | Heat | | Quarter-final | | Semi-final | | Final | |
| Athlete | Event | Result | Rank | Result | Rank | Result | Rank | Result | Rank |
|---|---|---|---|---|---|---|---|---|---|
| Eric Nkansah | 100 metres | 10.18 | 7 | 10.15 | 10 | 10.39 | 12 | Did not advance | |
| Leonard Myles-Mills | 100 metres | 10.25 | 21 | Did not advance | | | | | |
| Christian Nsiah | 200 metres | DQ | — | Did not advance | | | | | |
| Christian Nsiah Eric Nkansah; Aziz Zakari; Leonard Myles-Mills | 4 x 100 m relay | — | — | 38.94 | 15 | 38.88 | 11 | Did not advance | |

=== Women ===
Track and road events

| Athlete | Event | Heat | | Semi-final | | Final | |
| Athlete | Event | Result | Rank | Result | Rank | Result | Rank |
|---|---|---|---|---|---|---|---|
| Vida Anim | 100 metres | 11.35 | 17 | 11.29 | 12 | Did not advance | |
| Akosua Serwaa | 800 metres | 2:01.17 | 8 | 2:00.42 | 5 | 2:03.24 | 7 |
| Margaret Simpson | heptathlon | — | | | | DNF | — |
