= Elliott Quow =

American sprinter (born 1962)

Personal information
- Born: March 3, 1962 (age 64) Brooklyn, New York, United States

Sport
- Sport: Track and field
Medal record
Representing United States
Pan American Games
| Gold medal – first place | 1983 Caracas | 200 metres |
| Gold medal – first place | 1983 Caracas | 4x100m relay |
World Championships
| Silver medal – second place | 1983 Helsinki | 200 metres |
Summer Universiade
| Silver medal – second place | 1983 Edmonton | 200 metres |

Elliott Quow (born March 3, 1962) is a retired track and field sprinter from the United States, who was the 4th-ranked 200 meter runner in the world in 1983, only behind Carl Lewis, Calvin Smith and then world record holder Pietro Mennea. During that year he won the 200 meters at the NCAA Men's Outdoor Track and Field Championships while running for Rutgers University, the Summer Universiade, the Pan American Games and finished the season off with a silver medal at the inaugural 1983 World Championships, behind Smith but ahead of Mennea. He only returned to the world rankings one more time, two years later.

In 1995 he was named to the Rutgers University Olympic Sports Hall of Fame

== Achievements ==
| Year | Tournament | Venue | Result | Event |
|---|---|---|---|---|
| 1983 | Summer Universiade | Edmonton, Canada | 2nd | 200 metres |
| 1983 | Pan American Games | Caracas, Venezuela | 1st | 200 metres |
| 1983 | World Championships | Helsinki, Finland | 2nd | 200 metres |
