= Botswana at the 2017 World Championships in Athletics =

- WA code: BOT

in London, United Kingdom
- Competitors: 12 in 6 events
- Medals: Gold 0 Silver 0 Bronze 0 Total 0

World Championships in Athletics appearances
- 1983; 1987; 1991; 1993; 1995; 1997; 1999; 2001; 2003; 2005; 2007; 2009; 2011; 2013; 2015; 2017; 2019; 2022; 2023; 2025

Botswana competed at the 2017 World Championships in Athletics in London, United Kingdom, 4–13 August 2017.

== Results ==
(q = qualified, NM = no mark, SB = season best)

=== Men ===
Track and road events

Athlete	Event	Heat		Semifinal		Final	
Athlete	Event	Result	Rank	Result	Rank	Result	Rank
Isaac Makwala	200 metres	20.20	6 q	20.14	3 Q	20.44	6
Isaac Makwala	400 metres	44.55	1 Q	44.30	4 Q	DNS	–
Karabo Sibanda	400 metres	47.44	46	Did not advance			
Baboloki Thebe	400 metres	44.82	3 Q	44.33	5 Q	44.66	4
Nijel Amos	800 metres	1:47.10	27 Q	1:46.29	13 Q	1:45.83	5
Onkabetse Nkobolo; Baboloki Thebe; Nijel Amos; Karabo Sibanda	4 x 400 metres relay	3:06.50	14	—N/a		Did not advance	

=== Women ===
Track and road events

Athlete	Event	Heat		Semifinal		Final	
Athlete	Event	Result	Rank	Result	Rank	Result	Rank
Christine Botlogetswe	400 metres	53.50	43	Did not advance			
Lydia Jele	400 metres	51.41	11 q	51.57	13	Did not advance	
Amantle Montsho	400 metres	51.37	9 Q	51.28 SB	11	Did not advance	
Christine Botlogetswe; Lydia Jele; Galefele Moroko; Amantle Montsho	4 x 400 metres relay	3:26.90 NR	7 Q	—N/a		3:28.00	7
