= Senegal at the 2015 World Aquatics Championships =

- Flag of Senegal
- FINA code: SEN
- National federation: Federation Senegalaise de Natation et de Sauvetage

in Kazan, Russia
- Competitors: 4 in 1 sport
- Medals: Gold 0 Silver 0 Bronze 0 Total 0

World Aquatics Championships appearances
- 1973; 1975; 1978; 1982; 1986; 1991; 1994; 1998; 2001; 2003; 2005; 2007; 2009; 2011; 2013; 2015; 2017; 2019; 2022; 2023; 2024

Senegal competed at the 2015 World Aquatics Championships in Kazan, Russia from 24 July to 9 August 2015.

== Swimming ==
Senegalese swimmers have achieved qualifying standards in the following events (up to a maximum of 2 swimmers in each event at the A-standard entry time, and 1 at the B-standard):

Men

Athlete	Event	Heat		Semifinal		Final	
Athlete	Event	Time	Rank	Time	Rank	Time	Rank
Malick Fall	50 m breaststroke	28.71	42	did not advance			
Malick Fall	100 m breaststroke	1:04.30	56	did not advance			
Ismaël Kane	200 m freestyle	2:00.66	74	did not advance			
Ismaël Kane	100 m butterfly	1:00.94	67	did not advance			
Abdoul Niane	50 m freestyle	24.18	60	did not advance			
Abdoul Niane	100 m freestyle	53.33	81	did not advance			

Women

Athlete	Event	Heat		Semifinal		Final	
Athlete	Event	Time	Rank	Time	Rank	Time	Rank
Awa Ly N'diaye	50 m freestyle	29.78	87	did not advance			
Awa Ly N'diaye	100 m backstroke	1:16.27	64	did not advance			
