= 2017 World Championships in Athletics – Women's 400 metres =

Women's 400 metres at the 2017 World Championships
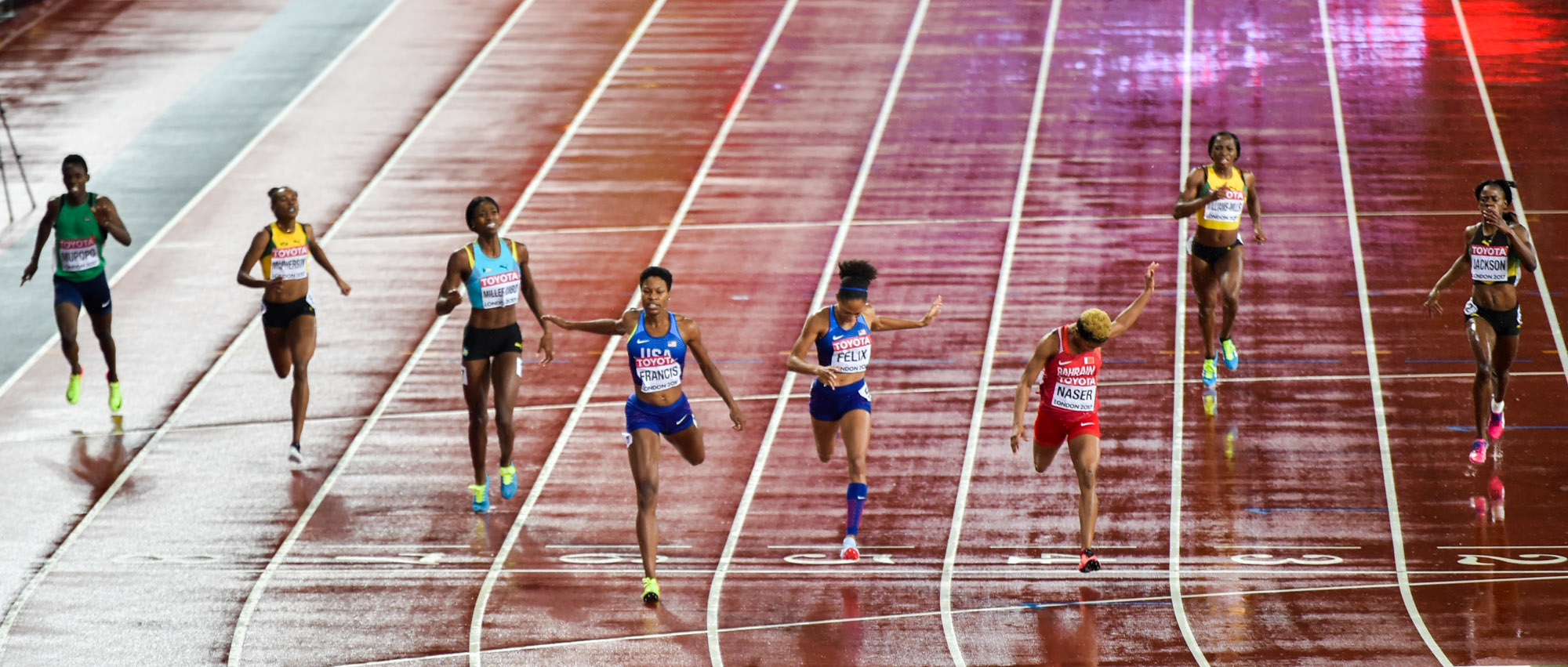
- The finish of the final.
- Venue: Olympic Stadium
- Dates: 6 August (heats); 7 August (semifinal); 9 August (final)
- Competitors: 49 from 32 nations

Medalists
| gold medal | Phyllis Francis | United States |
| silver medal | Salwa Eid Naser | Bahrain |
| bronze medal | Allyson Felix | United States |

The women's 400 metres at the 2017 World Championships in Athletics was held at the London Olympic Stadium on 6−7 and 9 August.

== Summary ==
In wet conditions, Shaunae Miller-Uibo took an early lead, which she maintained coming onto the home stretch, with Allyson Felix in second and Phyllis Francis and Salwa Eid Naser gaining on both of them. Miller-Uibo stumbled and slowed to a jog, being passed by Francis, Felix, and Nasser. Francis continued on to win while Nasser, breaking her own national record, dipped past Felix on the line.

== Records ==
Before the competition records were as follows:

| Record | Perf. | Athlete | Nat. | Date | Location |
|---|---|---|---|---|---|
| World | 47.60 | Marita Koch | GDR | 6 Oct 1985 | Canberra, Australia |
| Championship | 47.99 | Jarmila Kratochvílová | TCH | 10 Aug 1983 | Helsinki, Finland |
| World leading | 49.65 | Allyson Felix | USA | 9 Jul 2017 | London, Great Britain |
| African | 49.10 | Falilat Ogunkoya | NGR | 29 Jul 1996 | Atlanta, United States |
| Asian | 49.81 | Ma Yuqin | CHN | 11 Sep 1993 | Beijing, China |
| NACAC | 48.70 | Sanya Richards-Ross | USA | 16 Sep 2006 | Athens, Greece |
| South American | 49.64 | Ximena Restrepo | COL | 5 Aug 1992 | Barcelona, Spain |
| European | 47.60 | Marita Koch | GDR | 6 Oct 1985 | Canberra, Australia |
| Oceanian | 48.63 | Cathy Freeman | AUS | 29 Jul 1996 | Atlanta, United States |

The following records were set at the competition:

| Record | Perf. | Athlete | Nat. | Date |
|---|---|---|---|---|
| Sierra Leonean | 53.20 | Maggie Barrie | SLE | 6 Aug 2017 |
| Bahraini | 50.57 | Salwa Eid Naser | BHR | 6 Aug 2017 |
| Bahraini | 50.08 | Salwa Eid Naser | BHR | 7 Aug 2017 |
| Bahraini | 50.06 | Salwa Eid Naser | BHR | 9 Aug 2017 |

== Qualification standard ==
The standard to qualify automatically for entry was 52.10.

== Schedule ==
The event schedule, in local time (UTC+1), is as follows:

| Date | Time | Round |
|---|---|---|
| 6 August | 11:55 | Heats |
| 7 August | 20:55 | Semifinals |
| 9 August | 21:50 | Final |

== Results ==
=== Heats ===
The first round took place on 6 August in six heats as follows:

| Heat | 1 | 2 | 3 | 4 | 5 | 6 |
|---|---|---|---|---|---|---|
| Start time | 11:54 | 12:03 | 12:12 | 12:21 | 12:30 | 12:39 |
| Photo finish | link | link | link | link | link | link |

The first three in each heat ( Q ) and the next six fastest ( q ) qualified for the semifinals. The overall results were as follows:

| Rank | Heat | Lane | Name | Nationality | Time | Notes |
|---|---|---|---|---|---|---|
| 1 | 4 | 3 | Salwa Eid Naser | Bahrain | 50.57 | Q, NR |
| 2 | 4 | 9 | Phyllis Francis | United States | 50.94 | Q |
| 3 | 2 | 3 | Shaunae Miller-Uibo | Bahamas | 50.97 | Q |
| 4 | 4 | 4 | Novlene Williams-Mills | Jamaica | 51.00 | Q |
| 5 | 3 | 2 | Kabange Mupopo | Zambia | 51.09 | Q, SB |
| 6 | 6 | 4 | Chrisann Gordon | Jamaica | 51.14 | Q |
| 7 | 3 | 4 | Shericka Jackson | Jamaica | 51.26 | Q |
| 8 | 2 | 7 | Stephenie Ann McPherson | Jamaica | 51.27 | Q |
| 9 | 6 | 2 | Amantle Montsho | Botswana | 51.37 | Q, SB |
| 10 | 3 | 6 | Gunta Latiševa-Čudare | Latvia | 51.37 | Q, PB |
| 11 | 3 | 8 | Lydia Jele | Botswana | 51.41 | q |
| 12 | 5 | 8 | Quanera Hayes | United States | 51.43 | Q |
| 13 | 6 | 3 | Margaret Bamgbose | Nigeria | 51.57 | Q, SB |
| 14 | 2 | 9 | Yinka Ajayi | Nigeria | 51.58 | Q |
| 15 | 2 | 6 | Bianca Răzor | Romania | 51.64 | q |
| 16 | 3 | 3 | Ruth Spelmeyer | Germany | 51.72 | q, SB |
| 17 | 5 | 9 | Patience Okon George | Nigeria | 51.83 | Q |
| 18 | 5 | 4 | Zoey Clark | Great Britain & N.I. | 51.88 | Q |
| 19 | 6 | 7 | Iga Baumgart | Poland | 51.88 | q |
| 20 | 3 | 5 | Roxana Gomez | Cuba | 51.98 | q |
| 21 | 5 | 2 | Nirmala Sheoran | India | 52.01 | q |
| 22 | 3 | 7 | Elea-Mariama Diarra | France | 52.06 | |
| 23 | 6 | 6 | Tamara Salaški | Serbia | 52.13 | |
| 24 | 6 | 5 | Kendall Ellis | United States | 52.18 | |
| 25 | 2 | 4 | Emily Diamond | Great Britain & N.I. | 52.20 | |
| 26 | 5 | 7 | Morgan Mitchell | Australia | 52.22 | |
| 27 | 5 | 5 | Anastasiia Bryzgina | Ukraine | 52.26 | |
| 28 | 4 | 8 | Małgorzata Hołub | Poland | 52.26 | |
| 29 | 1 | 1 | Allyson Felix | United States | 52.44 | Q |
| 30 | 4 | 5 | Lisanne de Witte | Netherlands | 52.48 | |
| 31 | 6 | 9 | Déborah Sananes | France | 52.50 | |
| 32 | 2 | 5 | Aiyanna Stiverne | Canada | 52.55 | |
| 33 | 4 | 6 | Amalie Iuel | Norway | 52.55 | |
| 34 | 6 | 8 | Anyika Onuora | Great Britain & N.I. | 52.58 | |
| 35 | 1 | 2 | Irini Vasiliou | Greece | 52.61 | Q |
| 36 | 5 | 6 | Carline Muir | Canada | 52.70 | |
| 37 | 1 | 6 | Ashley Kelly | British Virgin Islands | 52.70 | Q |
| 38 | 3 | 9 | Anita Horvat | Slovenia | 52.78 | |
| 39 | 2 | 2 | Cátia Azevedo | Portugal | 52.79 | |
| 40 | 1 | 9 | Maria Benedicta Chigbolu | Italy | 53.00 | |
| 41 | 1 | 4 | Maggie Barrie | Sierra Leone | 53.20 | NR |
| 42 | 4 | 2 | Eleni Artymata | Cyprus | 53.26 | |
| 43 | 2 | 8 | Christine Botlogetswe | Botswana | 53.50 | |
| 44 | 1 | 8 | Justyna Święty | Poland | 53.62 | |
| 45 | 4 | 7 | Domonique Williams | Trinidad and Tobago | 53.72 | |
| 46 | 1 | 5 | Maximila Imali | Kenya | 53.97 | |
| 47 | 1 | 7 | Travia Jones | Canada | 54.02 | |
| 48 | 5 | 3 | Djénébou Danté | Mali | 54.04 | |
| 49 | 1 | 3 | Samantha Dirks | Belize | 54.74 | |

=== Semifinals ===
The semifinals took place on 7 August in three heats as follows:

| Heat | 1 | 2 | 3 |
|---|---|---|---|
| Start time | 20:55 | 21:03 | 21:11 |
| Photo finish | link | link | link |

The first two in each heat ( Q ) and the next two fastest ( q ) qualified for the final. The overall results were as follows:

| Rank | Heat | Lane | Name | Nationality | Time | Notes |
|---|---|---|---|---|---|---|
| 1 | 2 | 7 | Salwa Eid Naser | Bahrain | 50.08 | Q, NR |
| 2 | 2 | 4 | Allyson Felix | United States | 50.12 | Q |
| 3 | 1 | 5 | Shaunae Miller-Uibo | Bahamas | 50.36 | Q |
| 4 | 3 | 5 | Phyllis Francis | United States | 50.37 | Q |
| 5 | 1 | 7 | Stephenie Ann McPherson | Jamaica | 50.56 | Q, SB |
| 6 | 3 | 4 | Kabange Mupopo | Zambia | 50.60 | Q, SB |
| 7 | 2 | 9 | Novlene Williams-Mills | Jamaica | 50.67 | q |
| 8 | 2 | 5 | Shericka Jackson | Jamaica | 50.70 | q |
| 9 | 1 | 6 | Quanera Hayes | United States | 50.71 | |
| 10 | 3 | 7 | Chrisann Gordon | Jamaica | 50.87 | |
| 11 | 3 | 6 | Amantle Montsho | Botswana | 51.28 | SB |
| 12 | 1 | 8 | Gunta Latiševa-Čudare | Latvia | 51.57 | |
| 13 | 2 | 2 | Lydia Jele | Botswana | 51.57 | |
| 14 | 3 | 3 | Ruth Spelmeyer | Germany | 51.77 | |
| 15 | 3 | 2 | Iga Baumgart | Poland | 51.81 | |
| 16 | 3 | 8 | Zoey Clark | Great Britain & N.I. | 51.81 | PB |
| 17 | 1 | 3 | Roxana Gomez | Cuba | 52.01 | |
| 18 | 1 | 2 | Bianca Răzor | Romania | 52.09 | |
| 19 | 2 | 8 | Yinka Ajayi | Nigeria | 52.10 | |
| 20 | 3 | 9 | Margaret Bamgbose | Nigeria | 52.23 | |
| 21 | 1 | 4 | Patience Okon George | Nigeria | 52.60 | |
| 22 | 2 | 3 | Nirmala Sheoran | India | 53.07 | |
| 23 | 2 | 6 | Irini Vasiliou | Greece | 53.27 | |
| 24 | 1 | 9 | Ashley Kelly | British Virgin Islands | 54.50 | |

=== Final ===
The final took place on 9 August at 21:50. The results were as follows: (photo finish)

| Rank | Lane | Name | Nationality | Time | Notes |
|---|---|---|---|---|---|
| 1st place, gold medalist(s) | 6 | Phyllis Francis | United States | 49.92 | PB |
| 2nd place, silver medalist(s) | 4 | Salwa Eid Naser | Bahrain | 50.06 | NR |
| 3rd place, bronze medalist(s) | 5 | Allyson Felix | United States | 50.08 | |
| 4 | 7 | Shaunae Miller-Uibo | Bahamas | 50.49 | |
| 5 | 2 | Shericka Jackson | Jamaica | 50.76 | |
| 6 | 8 | Stephenie Ann McPherson | Jamaica | 50.86 | |
| 7 | 9 | Kabange Mupopo | Zambia | 51.15 | |
| 8 | 3 | Novlene Williams-Mills | Jamaica | 51.48 | |
