= Ghana at the 2005 World Championships in Athletics =

Ghana at the World Athletics Championships
- WA code: GHA
- National federation: Ghana Athletics Association
- Website: https://ghanaathletics.org/

6 August 2005 – 14 August 2005
- Competitors: 4 (2 men and 2 women) in Athletics sports
- Medals: Gold 0 Silver 1 Bronze 1 Total 2

World Athletics Championships appearances (overview)
- 1983; 1987; 1991; 1993; 1995; 1997; 1999; 2001; 2003; 2005; 2007; 2009; 2011; 2013; 2015; 2017; 2019; 2022; 2023; 2025

Ghana competed at the 2005 World Championships in Athletics held at Helsinki, Finland.

== Results ==
=== Men ===
Track and road events

Athlete	Event	Heat		Quarter-final		Semi-final		Final	
Athlete	Event	Result	Rank	Result	Rank	Result	Rank	Result	Rank
Aziz Zakari	100 metres	10.30	16	10.41	20	10.00	2	10.20	8
Ignisious Gaisah	Men's long jump	8.11	5	—				8.34	Silver

=== Women ===
Track and road events

Athlete	Event	Heat		Semi-final		Final	
Athlete	Event	Result	Rank	Result	Rank	Result	Rank
Vida Anim	100 metres	11.5	18	11.41 SB	17	Did not advance	
Margaret Simpson	heptathlon	—				6375	Bronze
