= Senegal at the 2019 World Aquatics Championships =

- Flag of Senegal
- FINA code: SEN
- National federation: Senegalese Swimming and Rescue Federation
- Website: fsns.sn (in French)

in Gwangju, South Korea
- Competitors: 5 in 2 sports
- Medals: Gold 0 Silver 0 Bronze 0 Total 0

World Aquatics Championships appearances
- 1973; 1975; 1978; 1982; 1986; 1991; 1994; 1998; 2001; 2003; 2005; 2007; 2009; 2011; 2013; 2015; 2017; 2019; 2022; 2023; 2024

Senegal competed at the 2019 World Aquatics Championships in Gwangju, South Korea from 12 to 28 July.

== Open water swimming ==
Senegal qualified one male open water swimmer.

Athlete	Event	Time	Rank
Amadou Ndiaye	Men's 5 km	59:57.2	51

== Swimming ==
Senegal entered four swimmers.

Men

Athlete	Event	Heat		Semifinal		Final	
Athlete	Event	Time	Rank	Time	Rank	Time	Rank
Steven Aimable	50 m backstroke	26.48	=46	did not advance			
Steven Aimable	100 m butterfly	54.94	=47	did not advance			
Abdoul Niane	50 m freestyle	23.88	70	did not advance			
Abdoul Niane	100 m freestyle	52.26	76	did not advance			

Women

Athlete	Event	Heat		Semifinal		Final	
Athlete	Event	Time	Rank	Time	Rank	Time	Rank
Jeanne Boutbien	50 m freestyle	27.33	53	did not advance			
Jeanne Boutbien	100 m freestyle	59.79	60	did not advance			
Sophia Diagne	50 m backstroke	31.98	35	did not advance			
Sophia Diagne	50 m butterfly	29.90	44	did not advance			

Mixed

Athlete	Event	Heat		Final	
Athlete	Event	Time	Rank	Time	Rank
Steven Aimable; Abdoul Niane; Sophia Diagne; Jeanne Boutbien	4 × 100 m mixed freestyle relay	3:44.21	23	did not advance	
Sophia Diagne; Abdoul Niane; Steven Aimable; Jeanne Boutbien	4 × 100 m mixed medley relay	DSQ		did not advance	
