= Senegal at the 1983 World Championships in Athletics =

- Flag of Senegal
- WA code: SEN

in Helsinki, Finland August 7–14, 1983
- Competitors: 7 (7 men) in 7 events
- Medals: Gold 0 Silver 0 Bronze 0 Total 0

World Championships in Athletics appearances
- 1983; 1987; 1991; 1993; 1995; 1997; 1999; 2001; 2003; 2005; 2007; 2009; 2011; 2013; 2015; 2017; 2019; 2022; 2023

Senegal competed at the 1983 World Championships in Athletics in Helsinki, Finland, from August 7 to 14, 1983.

== Men ==
Track and road events

Athlete	Event	Heat		Quarterfinal		Semifinal		Final	
Athlete	Event	Result	Rank	Result	Rank	Result	Rank	Result	Rank
Boubacar Diallo	200 metres	21.17	16 Q	20.97	14 Q	20.96	16	Did not advance	
Moussa Fall	400 metres	47.72	35	Did not advance					
Babacar Niang	800 metres	1:47.54	19	—		Did not advance			
Amadou Dia Ba	400 metres hurdles	50.59	13 q	—		49.18	=6 Q	49.61	7
Amadou Dia Ba; Babacar Niang; Moussa Fall; Boubacar Diallo; Mathurin Barry	4 × 400 metres relay	3:10.90	19 Q	—		3:09.63	14	Did not advance	

Field events

Athlete	Event	Qualification		Final	
Athlete	Event	Distance	Position	Distance	Position
Moussa Sagna Fall	High jump	2.15	=20	Did not advance	
Mamadou Diallo	Triple jump	15.67	21	Did not advance	
