= Senegal at the 2011 World Aquatics Championships =

- Flag of Senegal
- FINA code: SEN
- National federation: Federation Senegalaise de Natation et de Sauvetage

in Shanghai, China
- Competitors: 3 in 1 sport
- Medals: Gold 0 Silver 0 Bronze 0 Total 0

World Aquatics Championships appearances
- 1973; 1975; 1978; 1982; 1986; 1991; 1994; 1998; 2001; 2003; 2005; 2007; 2009; 2011; 2013; 2015; 2017; 2019; 2022; 2023; 2024

Senegal competed at the 2011 World Aquatics Championships in Shanghai, China between July 16 and 31, 2011.

== Swimming ==
Senegal had 3 swimmers:

Men

Athlete	Event	Heats		Semifinals		Final	
Athlete	Event	Time	Rank	Time	Rank	Time	Rank
Malick Fall	Men's 50m Breaststroke	28.33	27	did not advance			
Malick Fall	Men's 100m Breaststroke	1:02.55	48	did not advance			
Alban Laye-Joseph Diop	Men's 50m Backstroke	29.02	32	did not advance			
Alban Laye-Joseph Diop	Men's 100m Butterfly	1:01.60	60	did not advance			

Women

Athlete	Event	Heats		Semifinals		Final	
Athlete	Event	Time	Rank	Time	Rank	Time	Rank
Mareme Faye	Women's 100m Freestyle	1:06.37	68	did not advance			
Mareme Faye	Women's 50m Backstroke	33.43	53	did not advance			
