= Ghana at the 1993 World Championships in Athletics =

Ghana at the 1993 World Athletics Championships
- WA code: GHA
- National federation: Ghana Athletics Association
- Website: https://ghanaathletics.org/

13 August 1993 – 22 August 1993
- Competitors: 7 (6 men and 1 woman)
- Medals: Gold 0 Silver 0 Bronze 0 Total 0

World Athletics Championships appearances (overview)
- 1983; 1987; 1991; 1993; 1995; 1997; 1999; 2001; 2003; 2005; 2007; 2009; 2011; 2013; 2015; 2017; 2019; 2022; 2023; 2025

Ghana was one of the 198 countries that competed in the 1993 World Championships in Athletics in Stuttgart, Germany in August 1993.

== Results ==
7 athletes competed for Ghana in Tokyo. There was only one female athlete.

=== Men ===
Track and road events

Athlete	Event	Heat		Quarter-final		Semi-final		Final	
Athlete	Event	Result	Rank	Result	Rank	Result	Rank	Result	Rank
Salaam Gariba	100 metres	10.38	16	10.42	22	Did not advance			
Emmanuel Tuffour	100 metres	10.30	8	10.26	10	10.23	11	Did not advance	
Emmanuel Tuffour	200 metres	20.57	6	20.58	9	20.44	7	20.49	7
Nelson Boateng	200 metres	20.53	3	20.69	14	20.61	9	Did not advance	
Solomon Amegatcher	400 metres	45.68	5	45.59	14	45.58	11	Did not advance	
Ibrahim Hassan	400 metres	46.61	27	DNS	—	Did not advance			
Kennedy Osei	800 metres	1:48.65	15	—		1:46.48	17	Did not advance	
Salaam Gariba Nelson Boateng; Solomon Amegatcher; Emmanuel Tuffour	4 x 100 m relay	39.01	6	—	—	38.61 NR	6	Did not advance	

=== Women ===
Track and road events

Athlete	Event	Heat		Quarter-final		Semi-final		Final	
Athlete	Event	Result	Rank	Result	Rank	Result	Rank	Result	Rank
Philomena Mensah	100 metres	11.59	28	11.67	30	Did not advance			
Philomena Mensah	200 metres	23.67	21	24.05	29	Did not advance			
