= Senegal at the 2011 World Championships in Athletics =

- WA code: SEN
- National federation: Fédération Sénégalaise d'Athlétisme
- Website: www.athletisme-senegal.com

in Daegu
- Competitors: 2
- Medals: Gold 0 Silver 0 Bronze 0 Total 0

World Championships in Athletics appearances
- 1983; 1987; 1991; 1993; 1995; 1997; 1999; 2001; 2003; 2005; 2007; 2009; 2011; 2013; 2015; 2017; 2019; 2022; 2023

Sénégal competed at the 2011 World Championships in Athletics from August 27 to September 4 in Daegu, South Korea. A team of 2 athletes was announced to represent the country in the event.

== Results ==
=== Women ===
Athlete	Event	Preliminaries		Heats		Semifinals		Final	
Athlete	Event	Time Width Height	Rank	Time Width Height	Rank	Time Width Height	Rank	Time Width Height	Rank
Ndèye Fatou Soumah	400 metres			52.23 Q	15	52.10	16	Did not advance	
Amy Sène	Hammer throw	66.15	23					Did not advance	
