= Fiji at the 1983 World Championships in Athletics =

- Flag of Fiji
- WA code: FIJ

in Helsinki, Finland August 7–14, 1983
- Competitors: 2 (1 man and 1 woman) in 4 events
- Medals: Gold 0 Silver 0 Bronze 0 Total 0

World Championships in Athletics appearances
- 1983; 1987; 1991; 1993; 1995; 1997; 1999; 2001; 2003; 2005; 2007; 2009; 2011; 2013; 2015; 2017; 2019; 2022; 2023

Fiji competed at the 1983 World Championships in Athletics in Helsinki, Finland, from August 7 to 14, 1983.

== Men ==
Track and road events

Athlete	Event	Heat		Quarterfinal		Semifinal		Final	
Athlete	Event	Result	Rank	Result	Rank	Result	Rank	Result	Rank
Peni Bati	100 metres	11.11	57	Did not advance					
Peni Bati	200 metres	Did not start		Did not advance					

== Women ==
Field events

Athlete	Event	Qualification		Final	
Athlete	Event	Distance	Position	Distance	Position
Mereoni Vibose	Discus throw	42.36	19	Did not advance	
Mereoni Vibose	Javelin throw	49.44	21	Did not advance	
