= Mali at the 2019 World Athletics Championships =

Mali at the 2019 World Championships in Athletics
- WA code: MLI

in Doha, Qatar
- Competitors: 1
- Medals: Gold 0 Silver 0 Bronze 0 Total 0

World Championships in Athletics appearances
- 1983; 1987; 1991; 1993; 1995; 1997; 1999; 2001; 2003; 2005; 2007; 2009; 2011; 2013; 2015; 2017; 2019; 2022; 2023

Mali competed at the 2019 World Championships in Athletics in Doha, Qatar, from 27 September–6 October 2019.

== Results ==
(q – qualified, NM – no mark, SB – season best)

=== Men ===
Track and road events

Athlete	Event	Heat		Semi-final		Final	
Athlete	Event	Result	Rank	Result	Rank	Result	Rank
Fodé Sissoko	200 metres	21.30	45	Did not advance			
