= Senegal at the 2009 World Championships in Athletics =

- WA code: SEN

in Berlin
- Competitors: 4
- Medals: Gold 0 Silver 0 Bronze 0 Total 0

World Championships in Athletics appearances
- 1983; 1987; 1991; 1993; 1995; 1997; 1999; 2001; 2003; 2005; 2007; 2009; 2011; 2013; 2015; 2017; 2019; 2022; 2023

Senegal competes at the 2009 World Championships in Athletics from 15 to 23 August in Berlin.

== Team selection ==
Track and road events

Event	Athletes	
Event	Men	Women
400 metres		Fatou Bintou Fall; Amy Mbacké Thiam
800 metres	Abdoulaye Wagne	

Field and combined events

Event	Athletes	
Event	Men	Women
Long jump	Ndiss Kaba Badji	

== Results ==
=== Men ===
Track and road events

Event	Athletes	Heats		Semifinal		Final	
Event	Athletes	Result	Rank	Result	Rank	Result	Rank
800 m	Abdoulaye Wagne	1:48.22	32	did not advance			

Field and combined events

Event	Athletes	Qualification		Final	
Event	Athletes	Result	Rank	Result	Rank
Long jump	Ndiss Kaba Badji	7.98	18	did not advance	

=== Women ===
Track and road events

Event	Athletes	Heats		Semifinal		Final	
Event	Athletes	Result	Rank	Result	Rank	Result	Rank
400 m	Fatou Bintou Fall	54.46	30	did not advance			
400 m	Amy Mbacké Thiam	52.79	21	51.70	14	did not advance	
