= Ghana at the 2011 World Championships in Athletics =

- WA code: GHA
- National federation: Ghana Athletics Association

in Daegu
- Competitors: 6
- Medals: Gold 0 Silver 0 Bronze 0 Total 0

World Championships in Athletics appearances
- 1983; 1987; 1991; 1993; 1995; 1997; 1999; 2001; 2003; 2005; 2007; 2009; 2011; 2013; 2015; 2017; 2019; 2022; 2023; 2025

Ghana competed at the 2011 World Championships in Athletics from August 27 to September 4 in Daegu, South Korea.

== Team selection ==
A team of 7 athletes was announced to represent the country in the event. The team was led by 2005 World Championships heptathlon bronze medalist Margaret Simpson.

The following athlete appeared on the preliminary Entry List, but not on the Official Start List of the specific event, resulting in total number of 6 competitors:

KEY:	Did not participate	Competed in another event

	Event	Athlete
Men	4 x 100 metres relay	Agbeko Shepherd

== Results ==
=== Men ===
In the men's 100 metres heats on August 27, 2011, Aziz Zakari placed 6th in the race with a time of 10.55 seconds. He could thus not advance to the next round. His ranking at the heats stage was 35.

Athlete	Event	Preliminaries		Heats		Semifinals		Final	
Athlete	Event	Time Width Height	Rank	Time Width Height	Rank	Time Width Height	Rank	Time Width Height	Rank
Aziz Zakari	100 metres			10.55	35	Did not advance			
Emmanuel Kubi; Tim Abeyie; Agyapong Ashhad; Aziz Zakari	4 x 100 metres relay			39.17	16			Did not advance	
Ignatius Gaisah	Long jump	7.92	17					Did not advance	

Ignisious Gaisah competed in the Long jump heats on 2 September 2011. His best jump of 7.92m meant he ranked 17th, falling outside the top 12 who qualified for the final.

The men's 4×100 metres relay is scheduled to take part in heat 1 on September 4, 2011.

=== Women ===
Heptathlon

Margaret Simpson was Ghana's sole female competitor at the games. She placed 14th in the heptathlon with 6183 points.

Margaret Simpson	Heptathlon			
Margaret Simpson	Event	Results	Points	Rank
	100 m hurdles	13.43 SB	1060	9
	High jump	1.80 SB	978	12
	Shot put	12.48	693	21
	200 m	25.23	866	16
	Long jump	5.88	813	24
	Javelin throw	53.13	921	2
	800 m	2:17.91	852	20
Total			6183	14
