= Margaret Bamgbose =

Nigerian track and field sprinter

Personal information
- Born: 19 October 1993 (age 33) Evanston, Illinois; United States
- Education: University of Notre Dame
- Height: 1.71 m (5 ft 7 in)
- Weight: 62 kg (137 lb)

Sport
- Country: Nigeria
- Sport: Athletics
- Sprint: 400 m
- College team: Notre Dame Fighting Irish

Achievements and titles
- Personal bests: 400 m: Outdoor 51.11 s (2016); Indoor 52.10 (2015)
- Updated on 28 July 2016

Margaret Bamgbose (born October 19, 1993) is a Nigerian track and field sprinter who specialises in the 400 metres. She was an 11 All-Time American at University of Notre Dame.

== Professional ==
Bamgbose ran the 400 meters at 2017 World Championships in 20th in a time of 52.23.

Bamgbose ran the lead-off leg in the 4 × 400 m relay for Nigeria at the 2016 World Indoor Championships. The team consisting of Bamgbose, Regina George, Tameka Jameson and Ada Benjamin missed out on a podium finish in 4th place. She placed third at the 2016 Nigeria Championships behind Patience George and Omolara Omotoso and thereby sealed her place for the Rio Olympic Games.

| Year | Competition | Venue | Position | Event | Notes |
Representing Athletics Federation of Nigeria
| 2017 | 2017 World Championships | Olympic Stadium (London) | 20th | 400 meters | 52.23 |
| 2016 | 2016 Summer Olympics | Estádio Olímpico João Havelange; Rio de Janeiro, Brazil | 18th | 400 meters | 51.92 |
| 2016 | 2016 World Indoor Championships | Oregon Convention Center; Portland, Oregon | 4th | 4 × 400 meters relay | 3:34.03 |

== Notre Dame ==
In 2016, Bamgbose graduated from University of Notre Dame with a degree in Information Technology Management from the university's Mendoza College of Business. An 11-time All American, she set college bests in both the 200 m and 400 m in 2016. In 2014 and 2015, she finished in 6th place at the NCAA Outdoor finals on both occasions. She also made the finals in 2016 and finished in 4th place. She was also the 2015 ACC Indoor 400 Meter Champion.

=== NCAA Track and field championships ===
| Year | Competition | Venue | Position | Event | Notes |
Representing Notre Dame Fighting Irish
| 2016 | 2016 NCAA Division I Outdoor Track and Field Championships | Eugene, Oregon | 6th | 4 × 400 meters relay | 3:31.95 |
| 2016 | 2016 NCAA Division I Outdoor Track and Field Championships | Eugene, Oregon | 4th | 400 m | 51.57 |
| 2016 | 2016 NCAA Division I Indoor Track and Field Championships | University of Alabama at Birmingham | 5th | 400 meters | 52.12 |
| 2016 | 2016 NCAA Division I Indoor Track and Field Championships | University of Alabama at Birmingham | 6th | Distance medley relay | 11:01.86 |
| 2015 | 2015 NCAA Division I Outdoor Track and Field Championships | Eugene, Oregon | 12th | 4 × 400 meters relay | 3:35.625 |
| 2015 | 2015 NCAA Division I Outdoor Track and Field Championships | Eugene, Oregon | 6th | 400 m | 52.13 |
| 2015 | 2015 NCAA Division I Indoor Track and Field Championships | University of Arkansas | 6th | 400 meters | 52.65 |
| 2015 | 2015 NCAA Division I Indoor Track and Field Championships | University of Arkansas | 8th | Distance medley relay | 11:15.96 |
| 2014 | 2014 NCAA Division I Outdoor Track and Field Championships | Eugene, Oregon | DNF | 4 × 400 meters relay | DNF |
| 2014 | 2014 NCAA Division I Outdoor Track and Field Championships | Eugene, Oregon | 6th | 400 m | 51.72 |
| 2014 | 2014 NCAA Division I Indoor Track and Field Championships | University of New Mexico | 3rd | Distance medley relay | 11:11.54 |
| 2013 | 2013 NCAA Division I Outdoor Track and Field Championships | Eugene, Oregon | 19th | 4 × 400 meters relay | 3:38.22 |
| 2013 | 2013 NCAA Division I Outdoor Track and Field Championships | Eugene, Oregon | 18th | 400 m | 53.38 |
| 2013 | 2013 NCAA Division I Indoor Track and Field Championships | Fayetteville, Arkansas; University of Arkansas | 11th | 4 × 400 meters relay | 3:35.85 |

== Personal and Prep ==
Bamgbose was born in the United States to Nigerian parents, Sunday and Afusatu Bamgbose who hail from Abeokuta in the southwest of Nigeria. She has two siblings, an older sister and a younger brother. She attended Evanston Township High School, Illinois. Bamgbose started off as a hurdler in her high school and early university days before excelling in the 400 metres flat event.
