= Ghana at the 2022 World Athletics Championships =

- Flag of Ghana
- WA code: GHA

in Eugene, United States 15 July 2022 – 24 July 2022
- Competitors: 7 (6 men and 1 woman)
- Medals: Gold 0 Silver 0 Bronze 0 Total 0

World Athletics Championships appearances (overview)
- 1983; 1987; 1991; 1993; 1995; 1997; 1999; 2001; 2003; 2005; 2007; 2009; 2011; 2013; 2015; 2017; 2019; 2022; 2023; 2025

Ghana competed at the 2022 World Athletics Championships in Eugene, United States, from 15 to 24 July 2022.

== Results ==
Ghana entered 7 athletes.

Key

- Q = Qualified for the next round
- q = Qualified for the next round as a fastest loser or, in field events, by position without achieving the qualifying target
- NR = National record
- PB = Personal best
- SB = Season best
- N/A = Round not applicable for the event

=== Men ===
Track and road events

Athlete	Event	Preliminary		Heat		Semi-final		Final	
Athlete	Event	Result	Rank	Result	Rank	Result	Rank	Result	Rank
Joseph Amoah	100 m	—		10.22 (−0.3)	37	did not advance			
Joseph Amoah	200 m	—		20.40 (+1.0) SB	20	did not advance			
Benjamin Azamati-Kwaku	100 m	—		10.18 (+0.5)	29	did not advance			
Alex Amankwah	800 m	—		DQ		did not advance			
Joseph Amoah; Benjamin Azamati-Kwaku; Joseph Oduro Manu; Sean Safo-Antwi; Emmanuel Yeboah	4 × 100 m relay	—		38.58 SB	8 Q	—		38.07 NR	5

=== Women ===
Field events

Athlete	Event	Qualification		Final	
Athlete	Event	Distance	Position	Distance	Position
Deborah Acquah	Long jump	6.46	18	did not advance	
