= Calvin Smith =

American sprinter (born 1961)

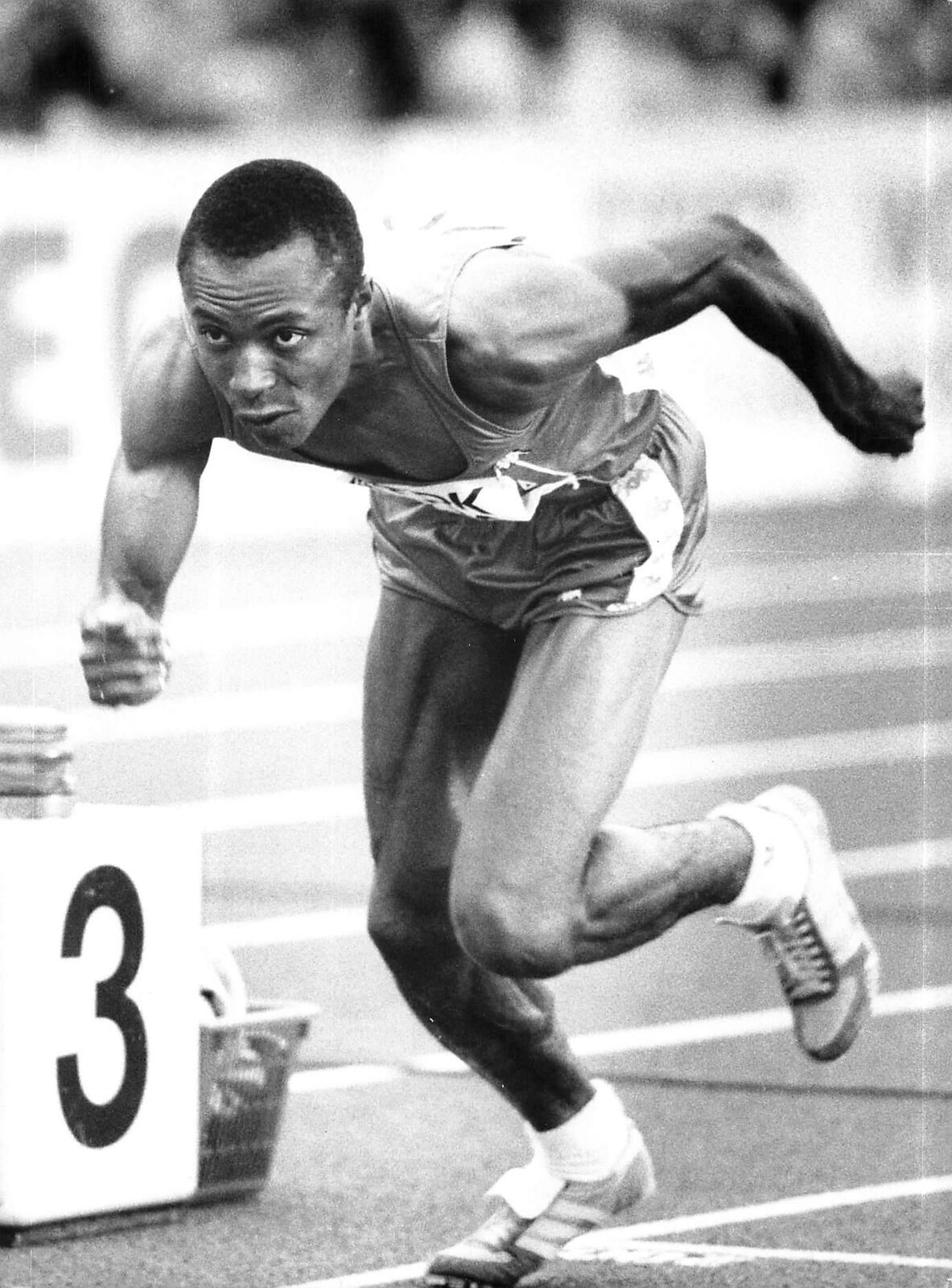

Personal information
- Nationality: American
- Born: January 8, 1961 (age 65) Bolton, Mississippi, U.S.
- Height: 5 ft 10 in (1.78 m)
- Weight: 152 lb (69 kg)

Sport
- Sport: Track and field
- Event: Sprints
- College team: Alabama Crimson Tide

Achievements and titles
- Personal bests: 100 m: 9.93 s (Colorado Springs, 1983); 200 m: 19.99 s (Zürich, 1983)
Medal record
Men's athletics
Representing the United States
Olympic Games
| Gold medal – first place | 1984 Los Angeles | 4 × 100 m relay |
| Bronze medal – third place | 1988 Seoul | 100 m |
World Championships
| Gold medal – first place | 1983 Helsinki | 200 m |
| Gold medal – first place | 1983 Helsinki | 4 × 100 m relay |
| Gold medal – first place | 1987 Rome | 200 m |
| Gold medal – first place | 1993 Stuttgart | 4 × 100 m relay |
| Silver medal – second place | 1983 Helsinki | 100 m |
Summer Universiade
| Gold medal – first place | 1981 Bucharest | 4 x 100 m relay |
| Silver medal – second place | 1981 Bucharest | 100 m |

Calvin Smith (born January 8, 1961) is a former sprint track and field athlete from the United States. He is a former world record holder in the 100-meter sprint with 9.93 seconds in 1983 and was twice world champion over 200 metres, in 1983 and 1987. He became Olympic champion in the 4 × 100-meter relay in 1984. He was born in Bolton, Mississippi.

== Background ==
Smith was brought up in Bolton, Mississippi, and attended Sumner Hill High School in Clinton, Mississippi.

Smith had a dazzling collegiate career at the University of Alabama. Smith set the 100 metre world record on July 3, 1983, at the U.S. Olympic Festival at Colorado Springs, with a run of 9.93 seconds. In doing so, he broke the previous record set by Jim Hines, which had lasted for almost 15 years. Both Hines' and Smith's records were set at high altitude.

At the inaugural Athletics World Championships in 1983, Smith claimed gold medals in the 200 m and the 4 × 100-meters relay (which the U.S. team won in world record time), as well as a silver medal behind Carl Lewis in the 100 meters.

In July 1983, Smith won the first of his two British AAA Championships titles in the 100 metres event at the 1982 AAA Championships. One month later in August 1983, Smith become the first athlete to run under 10 seconds (9.97) for the 100 m and under 20 seconds (19.99) for the 200 meters in the same evening in Zürich, Switzerland.

At the 1984 Summer Olympics in Los Angeles, Smith became champion as part of the U.S. 4 × 100-meters relay team, again establishing a new world record in this event.

At the 1987 World Championships, Smith successfully defended his 200-meter title. (At that time, the World Championships were held once every four years, whereas since 1991 they are held every two years.)

At the 1988 Summer Olympics in Seoul, Smith was involved in the most controversial Olympic 100 meters final of all time and ended up in third position (after the initial winner, Ben Johnson, was disqualified: SEE below).

Smith missed out on what seemed like a likely win in the 4 × 100-meters relay in Seoul because the U.S. team did not reach the final following a disqualification for passing the baton outside the legal area.

Smith continued to run for the U.S. national team into the 1990s. In the later years of his career, he was named captain of the U.S. track and field team at major events including the Olympic Games and World Championships. In 1990, Smith won his second British AAA Championships titles at the 1990 AAA Championships.

=== 1988 Olympics ===
Ben Johnson of Canada crossed the line first, with Lewis second, Linford Christie of Great Britain third, and Smith fourth. When Johnson tested positive for anabolic steroids and was stripped of his title, Smith was upgraded to third position. Johnson was not the only participant whose success was questioned: Lewis had tested positive at the Olympic Trials for pseudoephedrine, ephedrine and phenylpropanolamine. Lewis defended himself, claiming that he had accidentally consumed the banned substances. After the supplements that he had taken were analyzed to prove his claims, the USOC accepted his claim of inadvertent use, since a dietary supplement he ingested was found to contain "Ma huang", the Chinese name for Ephedra (ephedrine is known to help weight loss). Fellow Santa Monica Track Club teammates Joe DeLoach and Floyd Heard were also found to have the same banned stimulants in their systems, and were cleared to compete for the same reason.

The highest level of the stimulants Lewis recorded was 6 ppm, which was regarded as a positive test in 1988. According to the IOC rules at the time, positive tests with levels lower than 10 ppm were cause of further investigation but not immediate ban. Neal Benowitz, a professor of medicine at UC San Francisco who is an expert on ephedrine and other stimulants, agreed that "These [levels] are what you'd see from someone taking cold or allergy medicines and are unlikely to have any effect on performance."

Christie was found to have metabolites of pseudoephedrine in his urine after a 200 m heat at the same Olympics, but was later cleared of any wrongdoing. Of the finalists, only Smith and sixth-placed Robson da Silva never failed a drug test during their careers. Smith later said: "I should have been the gold medalist."

== Personal life ==
Smith is married to Melanie, whom he met at college, and has two children, a daughter Brittney and a son Calvin Smith Jr.

Smith retired from athletics in 1996 and was then for two years an assistant coach at the University of Alabama. He then moved with his family to Tampa, Florida where he has pursued a variety of careers. He is currently working for a non-profit agency that provides people with medical assistance.

== International competitions ==
| Year | Competition | Venue | Position | Event | Notes |
|---|---|---|---|---|---|
| 1980 | Pan American Junior Championships | Sudbury, Canada | 2nd | 100 m | 10.51 |
| 1980 | Pan American Junior Championships | Sudbury, Canada | 2nd | 200 m | 20.94 w |
| 1980 | Pan American Junior Championships | Sudbury, Canada | 1st | 4 × 100 m | 39.61 |
| 1981 | Universiade | Bucharest, Romania | 2nd | 100 m | 10.26 |
| 1981 | Universiade | Bucharest, Romania | 1st | 4 × 100 m | 38.70 |
| 1983 | World Championships | Helsinki, Finland | 2nd | 100 m | 10.21 |
| 1983 | World Championships | Helsinki, Finland | 1st | 200 m | 20.14 |
| 1983 | World Championships | Helsinki, Finland | 1st | 4 × 100 m | 37.86 WR |
| 1984 | Olympic Games | Los Angeles, United States | 1st | 4 × 100 m | 37.83 WR |
| 1987 | World Championships | Rome, Italy | 1st | 200 m | 20.16 |
| 1988 | Olympic Games | Seoul, South Korea | 3rd | 100 m | 9.99 |
| 1992 | World Cup | Havana, Cuba | 3rd | 100 m | 10.33 |
| 1992 | World Cup | Havana, Cuba | 1st | 4 × 100 m | 38.48 |
| 1993 | World Championships | Stuttgart, Germany | 1st | 4 x 100 m | 38.12 |

=== Personal bests ===
| Event | Date | Venue | Time (seconds) |
|---|---|---|---|
| 100 metres | 3 July 1983 | Colorado Springs, United States | 9.93 |
| 200 metres | 24 August 1983 | Zürich, Switzerland | 19.99 |

Smith's 19.99 run, made him the second man in history to achieve both a sub-10 second 100 m and a sub-20 second 200 m. Carl Lewis having achieved the feat 66 days earlier.

- All information taken from IAAF Profile.

== Rankings ==
Smith was ranked among the best in the USA and the world in both the 100 and 200 m sprint events from 1980 to 1993, according to the votes of the experts of Track and Field News.

100 meters
| Year | World rank | US rank |
|---|---|---|
| 1980 | 10th | 7th |
| 1981 | - | 9th |
| 1982 | 2nd | 2nd |
| 1983 | 2nd | 2nd |
| 1984 | 6th | 5th |
| 1985 | 6th | 3rd |
| 1986 | 6th | 2nd |
| 1987 | 5th | 2nd |
| 1988 | 2nd | 2nd |
| 1989 | 7th | 5th |
| 1990 | 6th | 4th |
| 1991 | - | - |
| 1992 | - | 10th |
| 1993 | - | 7th |

200 meters
| Year | World rank | US rank |
|---|---|---|
| 1980 | - | - |
| 1981 | - | - |
| 1982 | 2nd | 2nd |
| 1983 | 1st | 1st |
| 1984 | - | - |
| 1985 | 2nd | 2nd |
| 1986 | 3rd | 3rd |
| 1987 | 2nd | 2nd |
| 1988 | 4th | 3rd |
| 1989 | 5th | 3rd |
| 1990 | - | - |
| 1991 | - | - |
| 1992 | - | - |
| 1993 | - | - |

== Records and World Bests ==
Smith achieved the following world records and world best times during his career:

- World record of 9.93 s at the United States Air Force Academy on 3 July 1983.
- World low-altitude best time of 9.97 s in Zürich on 24 August 1983.
- World record at the 4 × 100 m relay in Helsinki on 10 August 1983.
- World record in the 4 × 100 m relay in Los Angeles on 11 August 1984.

=== Track records ===
As of September 2024, Smith holds the following track records for 100 metres.

| Location | Time | Windspeed m/s | Date | Notes |
|---|---|---|---|---|
| Bratislava | 10.07 | +1.4 | 09/06/1988 | |
| Chemnitz | 9.91 | +2.1 | 09/07/1982 | |
| Colorado Springs, Colorado | 9.93 | +1.4 | 03/07/1983 | World record until 1988 Olympic final |

== Accolades ==
In 2007, Smith was inducted into the United States Track and Field Hall of Fame.

In 2014, Smith was inducted into the Mississippi Sports Hall of Fame.

In 2016, Smith was inducted into the Alabama Sports Hall of Fame.

== See also ==
- Men's 100 metres world record progression
