= Ghana at the 1983 World Championships in Athletics =

- Flag of Ghana
- WA code: GHA

in Helsinki, Finland August 7–14, 1983
- Competitors: 9 (5 men and 4 women) in 7 events
- Medals: Gold 0 Silver 0 Bronze 0 Total 0

World Championships in Athletics appearances
- 1983; 1987; 1991; 1993; 1995; 1997; 1999; 2001; 2003; 2005; 2007; 2009; 2011; 2013; 2015; 2017; 2019; 2022; 2023; 2025

Ghana competed at the 1983 World Championships in Athletics in Helsinki, Finland, from August 7 to 14, 1983.

== Men ==
Track and road events

| Athlete | Event | Heat | | Quarterfinal | | Semifinal | | Final | |
| Athlete | Event | Result | Rank | Result | Rank | Result | Rank | Result | Rank |
|---|---|---|---|---|---|---|---|---|---|
| Ernest Obeng | 100 metres | 10.35w | 11 Q | 10.51 | 20 | Did not advance | | | |
| Awudu Nuhu | 200 metres | 22.93 | 48 | Did not advance | | | | | |
| Abu Alhassan | 400 metres | 48.14 | 36 | Did not advance | | | | | |
| Sam Aidoo; Awudu Nuhu; Ernest Obeng; Edward Pappoe | 4 × 100 metres relay | 41.92 | 20 | — | | Did not advance | | | |

== Women ==
Track and road events

| Athlete | Event | Heat | | Quarterfinal | | Semifinal | | Final | |
| Athlete | Event | Result | Rank | Result | Rank | Result | Rank | Result | Rank |
|---|---|---|---|---|---|---|---|---|---|
| Mary Mensah | 100 metres | 12.26 | =36 | Did not advance | | | | | |
| Mary Mensah | 200 metres | 24.91 | 30 q | DNS | | Did not advance | | | |
| Mercy Addy; Grace Armah; Mary Mensah; Elisabeth Wilson | 4 × 100 metres relay | 47.51 | 15 | — | | | | Did not advance | |
