= Eric Akogyiram =

Ghanaian sprinter

Personal information
- Nationality: Ghanaian
- Born: 25 June 1969 (age 57)

Sport
- Sport: Athletics
- Event: 100 metres
Medal record
Men's athletics
Representing Ghana
All-African Games
Silver medal – second place	1987 All-Africa Games	100 m
African Championships
Silver medal – second place	1988 Annaba	4×100 m

Eric Akogyiram (born 25 June 1969) is a retired Ghanaian sprinter who specialized in the 100 metres.

Akogyiram competed for the BYU Cougars track and field team before transferring to the George Mason Patriots track and field program. He was an All-American for BYU, finishing 6th in the 100 m at the 1990 NCAA Division I Outdoor Track and Field Championships.

He won the silver medal at the 1987 All-Africa Games. The same year he competed at the 1987 World Championships, reaching the semi-final with the relay team. He also competed at the 1992 Olympic Games.

His personal best time was 10.23 seconds, achieved in April 1990 in Provo.

== Achievements ==
Year	Competition	Venue	Position	Event	Notes
Representing Ghana
1987	All-Africa Games	Nairobi, Kenya	2nd	100 m	10.32
