= Steven Aimable =

Senegalese swimmer (born 1999)

Personal information
- Born: 7 February 1999 (age 27) Cayenne, French Guiana

Sport
- Sport: Swimming
- Strokes: Backstroke, butterfly
- College team: Nova Southeastern University
Medal record
Men's swimming
Representing Senegal
African Games
Bronze medal – third place	2023 Accra	50 m backstroke

Steven Aimable (born 7 February 1999 in Cayenne) is a Senegalese swimmer. In 2019, he represented Senegal at the 2019 World Aquatics Championships held in Gwangju, South Korea. In the men's 50 metre backstroke he finished in 46th place in the heats.

In the same year, he also represented Senegal at the 2019 African Games held in Rabat, Morocco. His best result came in the men's 100 metre butterfly event where he finished in 7th place in the final. In the men's 50 metre freestyle, men's 100 metre freestyle, men's 50 metre backstroke and men's 50 metre butterfly events he did not qualify to compete in the final.

In 2021, he competed in the men's 100 metre butterfly event at the 2020 Summer Olympics held in Tokyo, Japan.
