= Ghana at the 2017 World Championships in Athletics =

- WA code: GHA

in London
- Competitors: 8 in 5 events
- Medals: Gold 0 Silver 0 Bronze 0 Total 0

World Championships in Athletics appearances
- 1983; 1987; 1991; 1993; 1995; 1997; 1999; 2001; 2003; 2005; 2007; 2009; 2011; 2013; 2015; 2017; 2019; 2022; 2023

Ghana competed at the 2017 World Championships in Athletics in London, United Kingdom, from 4 to 13 August 2017.

== Results ==
(q – qualified, NM – no mark, SB – season best)

=== Men ===
Track and road events

Athlete	Event	Heat		Semifinal		Final	
Athlete	Event	Result	Rank	Result	Rank	Result	Rank
Emmanuel Dasor	400 metres	DNS	–	Did not advance			
Alex Amankwah	800 metres	1:47.56	32	Did not advance			

=== Women ===
Track and road events

Athlete	Event	Heat		Semifinal		Final	
Athlete	Event	Result	Rank	Result	Rank	Result	Rank
Janet Amponsah	200 metres	23.77	37	Did not advance			
Flings Owusu-Agyapong; Gemma Acheampong; Akua Obeng-Akrofi; Janet Amponsah	4 × 100 metres relay	43.68 SB	10	—		Did not advance	

Field events

Athlete	Event	Qualification		Final	
Athlete	Event	Distance	Position	Distance	Position
Nadia Eke	Triple jump	13.54	23	Did not advance	
