= Ghana at the 2019 World Athletics Championships =

Ghana at the 2019 World Championships in Athletics
- WA code: GHA

in Doha, Qatar
- Competitors: 10
- Medals: Gold 0 Silver 0 Bronze 0 Total 0

World Championships in Athletics appearances
- 1983; 1987; 1991; 1993; 1995; 1997; 1999; 2001; 2003; 2005; 2007; 2009; 2011; 2013; 2015; 2017; 2019; 2022; 2023

Ghana competed at the 2019 World Championships in Athletics in Doha, Qatar, from 27 September–6 October 2019.

== Results ==
(q – qualified, NM – no mark, SB – season best)

=== Men ===
Track and road events

Athlete	Event	Preliminary		Heat		Semi-final		Final	
Athlete	Event	Result	Rank	Result	Rank	Result	Rank	Result	Rank
Joseph Paul Amoah	100 metres	—		10.36	34	Did not advance			
Sean Safo-Antwi; Benjamin Azamati-Kwaku; Martin Owusu Antwi; Joseph Paul Amoah	4 × 100 metres relay	—		38.24 SB	13	—		Did not advance	

=== Women ===
Track and road events

Athlete	Event	Heat		Semi-final		Final	
Athlete	Event	Result	Rank	Result	Rank	Result	Rank
Flings Owusu-Agyapong; Gemma Acheampong; Persis William-Mensah; Halutie Hor	4 × 100 metres relay	43.62 SB	11	—		Did not advance	
