= Moussa Savadogo (athlete) =

Malian sprinter (born 1959)

Personal information
- Nationality: Malian
- Born: 8 April 1959 (age 67)

Sport
- Sport: Sprinting
- Event: 200 metres

Moussa Savadogo (born 8 April 1959) is a Malian sprinter. He competed in the men's 200 metres at the 1984 Summer Olympics.
