= Athletics Fiji =

Governing body of athletics in Fiji

- Sport: Athletics
- Founded: 1947
- Affiliation: World Athletics
- Affiliation date: 1950
- Regional affiliation: OAA
- Headquarters: Suva, Viti Levu
- President: Filimoni Vuli Waqa
- Vice president(s): Joji Liga
- Secretary: Lilian Amasa
- Replaced: Fiji Amateur Athletics Association

Official website
- www.athleticsfiji.com
- (Fiji)

Athletics Fiji is the governing body for the sport of athletics in Fiji. The current president is Filimoni Vuli Waqa, holding the position since 2019.

== History ==
Athletics Fiji was founded in 1947 as Fiji Amateur Athletics Association, and was affiliated to the IAAF in the year 1950.

== World Athletics ==
- Oceania Athletics Association (OAA)

Moreover, it is part of the following national organisations:

- Fiji Association of Sports and National Olympic Committee (FASANOC)

== National records ==
Athletics Fiji maintains the Fijian records in athletics.
