= Ghana Athletics Association =

Governing body of athletics in Ghana

- Sport: Athletics
- Abbreviation: GAA
- Founded: 1944
- Affiliation: CAA
- Headquarters: Accra
- President: Francis Dodoo

Official website
- athleticsghana.com
- (Ghana)

The Ghana Athletics Association was founded in 1944 as the Gold Coast Amateur Athletics Association. On the part of the Ghana Olympic Committee, the Ghana Athletics Association is the only Athletics Association authorized to send athletes to the Olympic Games.
