= Shelly-Ann Fraser-Pryce =

Retired Jamaican track and field sprinter (born 1986)

The Honourable Shelly-Ann Fraser-Pryce OJ, CD, OD
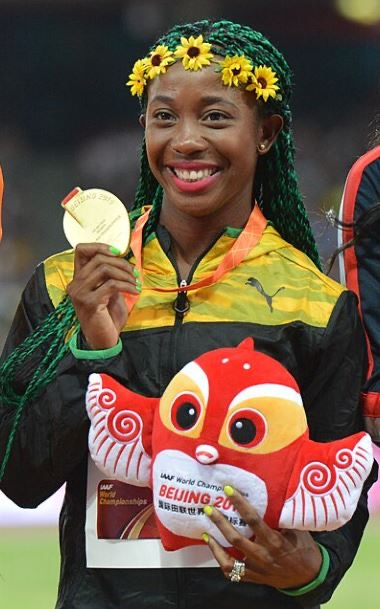
- Fraser-Pryce in 2015 after winning her third 100 m world title.

Personal information
- Born: Shelly-Ann Fraser; 27 December 1986 (age 39) Kingston, Jamaica
- Height: 1.52 m (5 ft 0 in) (Note: Height varies by source. Olympic.org described her as 1.52 m (5 feet) tall, Olympic Channel stated 1.60 m (5 ft 3 in), while her sponsor Nike stated 1.55 m (5 ft 1 in).)
- Weight: 52 kg (115 lb)
- Spouse: Jason Pryce (married 2011)

Sport
- Country: Jamaica
- Sport: Track and field
- Events: 60 m, 100 m, 200 m
- Club: Elite Performance Track Club (2020–2024); MVP Track Club (2006–2020)
- Coached by: Andre Wellington (2025); Reynaldo Walcott (2020–2024); Stephen Francis (2006–2020)

Achievements and titles
- Highest world ranking: 100 m: 1st (2008, 2012, 2013, 2015, 2019, 2022); 200 m: 1st (2013)
- Personal bests: 60 m: 6.98 s (2014); 100 m: 10.60 s (2021); 200 m: 21.79 s (2021)
Medal record
Event	1st	2nd	3rd
Olympic Games	3	4	1
World Championships	10	6	1
World Indoor Championships	1	0	0
World Athletics Final	1	1	0
Pan American Games	1	0	0
Commonwealth Games	1	0	0
CARIFTA Games Junior (U20)	1	0	1
CAC Junior Championships (U17)	1	0	0
Total	19	11	3
Women's athletics
Representing Jamaica
Olympic Games
Gold medal – first place	2008 Beijing	100 m
Gold medal – first place	2012 London	100 m
Gold medal – first place	2020 Tokyo	4 × 100 m relay
Silver medal – second place	2012 London	200 m
Silver medal – second place	2012 London	4 × 100 m relay
Silver medal – second place	2016 Rio de Janeiro	4 × 100 m relay
Silver medal – second place	2020 Tokyo	100 m
Bronze medal – third place	2016 Rio de Janeiro	100 m
World Athletics Championships
Gold medal – first place	2009 Berlin	100 m
Gold medal – first place	2009 Berlin	4 × 100 m relay
Gold medal – first place	2013 Moscow	100 m
Gold medal – first place	2013 Moscow	200 m
Gold medal – first place	2013 Moscow	4 × 100 m relay
Gold medal – first place	2015 Beijing	100 m
Gold medal – first place	2015 Beijing	4 × 100 m relay
Gold medal – first place	2019 Doha	100 m
Gold medal – first place	2019 Doha	4 × 100 m relay
Gold medal – first place	2022 Eugene	100 m
Silver medal – second place	2007 Osaka	4 × 100 m relay
Silver medal – second place	2011 Daegu	4 × 100 m relay
Silver medal – second place	2022 Eugene	200 m
Silver medal – second place	2022 Eugene	4 × 100 m relay
Silver medal – second place	2023 Budapest	4 × 100 m relay
Silver medal – second place	2025 Tokyo	4 × 100 m relay
Bronze medal – third place	2023 Budapest	100 m
World Athletics Indoor Championships
Gold medal – first place	2014 Sopot	60 m
World Athletics Final
Gold medal – first place	2008 Stuttgart	100 m
Silver medal – second place	2009 Thessaloniki	100 m
World Athletics Relays
Bronze medal – third place	2014 Nassau	4 × 200 m relay
Bronze medal – third place	2019 Yokohama	4 × 200 m relay
Bronze medal – third place	2025 Guangzhou	4×100 m relay
Diamond League
First place	2012	100 m
First place	2013	100 m
First place	2013	200 m
First place	2015	100 m
First place	2022	100 m
Second place	2019 Brussels	100 m
Pan American Games
Gold medal – first place	2019 Lima	200 m
Commonwealth Games
Gold medal – first place	2014 Glasgow	4 × 100 m relay
Athletics World Cup
Silver medal – second place	2018 London	4 × 100 m relay
NACAC Championships
Silver medal – second place	2018 Toronto	4 × 100 m relay

Shelly-Ann Fraser-Pryce (née Fraser; born December 27, 1986) is a retired Jamaican track and field sprinter who competed in the 60 metres, 100 m and 200 m. She is widely regarded as one of the greatest sprinters of all time.

One of the most enduring track athletes in history, Fraser-Pryce's career spanned over a decade and a half, from the late 2000s to the mid 2020s. Her success on the track, including her consistency at major championships, helped to usher in the golden age of Jamaican sprinting. In the 100 m, her signature event, she is a two-time Olympic gold medallist and a five-time world champion. In the 200 m, she has won gold and silver at the World Athletics Championships, as well as an Olympic silver medal.

An eight-time Olympic medallist, she rose from relative obscurity at the 2008 Beijing Olympics to become the first Caribbean woman to win gold in the 100 m. At the 2012 London Olympics, she became the third woman in history to defend an Olympic 100 m title. After injury affected her season, she won bronze at the 2016 Rio Olympics. Thirteen years after her first Olympic win, she won a silver medal at the 2020 Tokyo Olympics, becoming the most decorated 100 m sprinter at the Olympic Games.

At the biennial World Athletics Championships, Fraser-Pryce is one of the most decorated athletes in history, winning ten gold, five silver medals and a bronze. She is the only sprinter to win five world titles in the 100 m—in 2009, 2013, 2015, 2019, and 2022. Her win in 2019 made her the first mother in 24 years to claim a global 100 m title, while her win in 2022 at age 35 made her the oldest sprinter ever to become world champion. In 2013, she became the first woman to sweep the 100 m, 200 m and 4 × 100 m at the same World Championship, and was voted the IAAF World Athlete of the Year. She also won the 60 m world indoor title in 2014, becoming the first ever female athlete to hold world titles in all four sprint events at the same time.

A dominant force in women's sprinting, Fraser-Pryce has won more individual global (Note: The Olympic Games and World Athletics Championships are the two global outdoor athletics championships at the elite senior level, compared to continental or regional championships like the Pan American Games, Commonwealth Games or NACAC Championships.) sprint titles than any other female sprinter in history, and is the most decorated 100 m sprinter of all time. Nicknamed the "pocket rocket" for her petite stature and explosive block starts, her personal best of 10.60 seconds makes her the third fastest woman ever. In 2022, CBC Sports recognized her as the greatest 100 m sprinter of all time, while many sources described her as the greatest female sprinter in history. In 2019, she was listed among BBC's 100 inspiring and influential women in the world. In 2023, she won the Laureus World Sports Award for Sportswoman of the Year.

== Biography ==
=== Early years ===
Shelly-Ann Fraser was born to Orane Fraser and Maxine Simpson in the inner city community of Waterhouse, in Kingston. She was raised with her two brothers by her mother, a former athlete who worked as a street vendor. A gifted sprinter from a very young age, she started running barefoot in primary school. Throughout her time at the Wolmer's High School for Girls, she was uncertain about pursuing a career in track and field. However, she was active on the youth athletics scene, competing in the famous Inter-Secondary Schools Boys and Girls Championships (known locally as "Champs"), and winning 100 m bronze at age 16. In 2002, she ran 25.35 s to win the 200 m title at the Jamaican Under-18 Championships, and later that year helped the Jamaican junior team win 4 × 100 m relay gold at the Central American and Caribbean Junior Championships, held in Bridgetown, Barbados. At the 2005 CARIFTA Games in Trinidad and Tobago, she won bronze in the 100 m in 11.73 s, and earned a gold medal as part of the 4 × 100 m relay team.

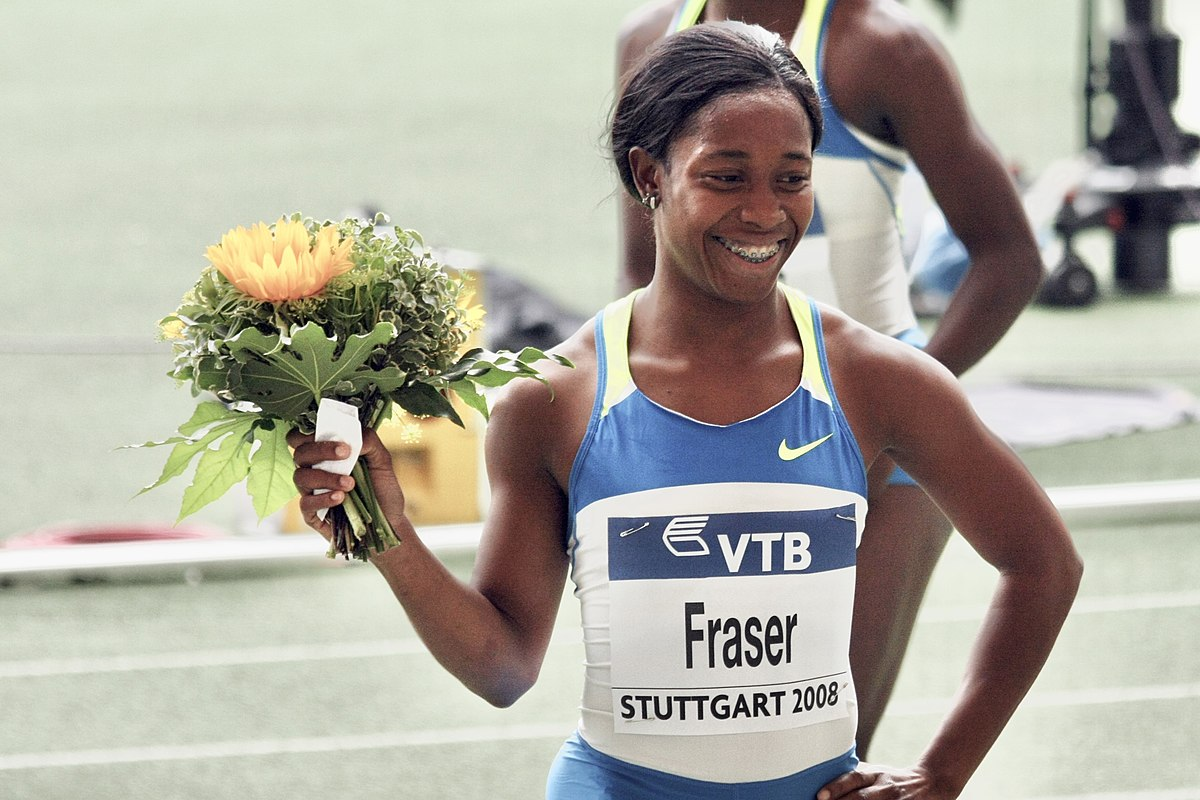
Fraser-Pryce celebrates after winning the 100 m at the 2008 World Athletics Final.

In 2006, Fraser-Pryce began studying at the University of Technology, Jamaica, where she met Stephen Francis. At the time, Francis was the head coach at the MVP (Maximising Velocity and Power) Track Club, and had guided the career of former 100 m world record holder Asafa Powell. Despite encouragement from peers and coaches, Fraser-Pryce was unfocused as a young athlete. She was often late for practice, and at times wouldn't complete her workouts for fear that she would become too muscular.

Fraser-Pryce began to achieve success on the senior national and international stages in 2007. At age 20, she was fifth in the 100 m at the Jamaican National Senior Championships in June, setting a new personal best of 11.31 s. Although a fifth-place finish meant that she was ineligible to compete in the 100 m event at the 2007 Osaka World Championships, she was selected as a reserve for Jamaica's 4 × 100 m relay team. Hoping to gain experience at an international level, she made her debut on the European athletics circuit in July and saw promising results. She first ran a wind-assisted 11.39 s for second place at the Budapest Iharos Memorial, followed by 11.44 s to win the Meeting Terra Sarda in Italy. In August, she again won the 100 m at the Stockholm DN-Galan, posting 11.57 s.

At the World Championships in September, Fraser-Pryce ran only in the relay heats, helping her team place second. She eventually earned a silver medal when the Jamaican team finished behind the United States in the 4 × 100 m relay final. Despite her initial anxiety towards competing at the World Championships, Fraser-Pryce credited her experience in Osaka for raising her confidence, changing her attitude towards athletics, and for making her much more focused.

=== 2008: First Olympic 100 m gold ===
Fraser-Pryce's breakthrough in 2008 was sudden and unexpected. At the Jamaican Olympic trials in June, she was a surprise second-place finisher in the hotly contested 100 m final, posting her first ever sub-11 s clocking of 10.85 s. Compatriots Kerron Stewart won the national title in 10.80 s and Sherone Simpson was third in 10.87 s, completing the Olympic team for this event. However, Jamaican sprint darling Veronica Campbell-Brown, the 2007 world 100 m champion and 2004 Olympic 200 m champion, finished fourth in 10.88 s, failing to make the team. With Fraser-Pryce barely known among the local athletics scene, many considered her too inexperienced for the Olympics, and petitioned the Jamaica Athletics Administrative Association (JAAA) to have her swapped in favour of Campbell-Brown. However, the JAAA upheld its rule permitting only the top-three finishers on the team. Fraser-Pryce recalled being disappointed but mostly unfazed by the backlash, and saw her underdog status as an advantage: "I went in just wanting to do well. So there was no pressure and nobody expected anything of me and I was able to compete better, relaxed and be my best."

"I still look back at that race and get goosebumps. To be the first Jamaican woman to win [an Olympic 100 m] gold medal was so exciting. To add that title to my résumé was equally as important as the medal itself."

— Fraser-Pryce on her win at the 2008 Beijing Olympics.

At the 2008 Beijing Olympics, Fraser-Pryce faced off against the American trio of Torri Edwards, Muna Lee and decorated sprinter Lauryn Williams. She won her heat in 11.35 s, her quarterfinal in 11.06 s, and her semifinal in 11.00 s. In the 100 m final, she led a Jamaican sweep of the medals, trailed by Sherone Simpson and Kerron Stewart, who both posted 10.98 s for silver (no bronze was awarded). Replicating the success of compatriot Usain Bolt from the night before, Fraser-Pryce became the first ever Caribbean woman to win 100 m gold at the Olympics. Her winning time of 10.78 s was not only an improvement of 0.53 seconds from her previous season's best, it was also the second fastest in Olympic history at the time, behind Florence Griffith Joyner's 1988 Olympic record. Jamaica's top-three finish was the first-ever sweep of medals in a women's 100 m by any nation at an Olympics or World Championships.

In the 4 × 100 m relay, Fraser-Pryce ran the lead leg alongside Stewart, Simpson and Campbell-Brown. The Jamaican team won their heat and qualified as the fastest overall for the final. However, disappointment followed in the final when a botched baton exchange led to their disqualification.

Fraser-Pryce returned to the European circuit after the Olympics, placing second at the British Grand Prix in 11.29 s, first at the Athletissima track meet in 11.03 s, and first at the Rieti meet in 11.06 s. She capped her season in September after running 10.94 s to win 100 m gold at the 2008 IAAF World Athletics Final.

=== 2009: First 100 m world title ===
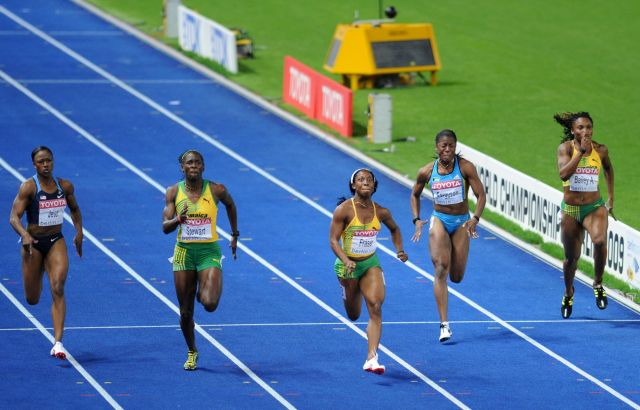
Fraser-Pryce (centre) in the 2009 world 100 m final. At 22 years old, her winning time of 10.73 s made her the joint third fastest woman in history (at the time).

The following year, Fraser-Pryce proved that she was no one-hit wonder by capturing 100 m gold at the 2009 Berlin World Championships. Despite ultimately taking the title, her early season was marred by injury, followed by an appendix surgery in April, which impeded her training and preparation. In June, she finished fourth at the Prefontaine Classic, but later that month, she ran a world-leading 10.88 s to claim her first 100 m national title at the Jamaican Championships, finishing ahead of defending champion Kerron Stewart (10.93 s). At the Rome Golden Gala in July, Stewart emerged as gold medal favourite after defeating Fraser-Pryce in 10.75 s, becoming the fifth fastest woman in history at the time.

At the World Championships in August, Fraser-Pryce finished second in her heat and quarterfinal, but came into form in the semifinal with 10.79 s, the fastest semifinal time in the history of the championship (at the time). In the 100 m final, she made a flying start and held off a late challenge from Stewart to win her first world title in a new personal best of 10.73 s. Sports writer Matthew Brown attributed her victory to "one of the most sensational starts ever seen in a major final... [she was] a metre and a half clear of the field before a tenth of the race was run." Stewart equalled her own personal best of 10.75 s for silver, while Carmelita Jeter of the United States (10.90 s) prevented another Jamaican podium sweep by beating Campbell-Brown (10.95 s) to the bronze. Fraser-Pryce's winning time made her the joint third fastest woman in history at the time, and shaved one-hundredth of a second from Merlene Ottey's Jamaican record. With the victory, she also joined Gail Devers of the U.S. as the second woman to hold the 100 m Olympic and world titles simultaneously (a feat she replicated in the 2012–2013 season). Giddy with excitement, Fraser-Pryce was shocked at her achievement: "Olympic and world champion – can you believe it? Me?" Asked whether she considered herself the favourite going into the final, she praised her rivals, saying, "That’s something I never do. The board is blank at the start. Everybody else wants it too." Days later, she added a second gold medal at the championships as part of Jamaica's 4 × 100 m relay team, running alongside Stewart, Simone Facey and Aleen Bailey.

Back on the international circuit that year, she finished fourth at the Zürich Weltklasse in 11.10 s, second at the Memorial Van Damme in 10.98 s, and first at the Rieti Meeting in 11.18 s. She ended her season in September following the 2009 IAAF World Athletics Final, where she clocked 10.89 s for silver behind Jeter in the 100 m final.

=== 2010–2011: Suspension and return ===
In June 2010, Fraser-Pryce received a six-month suspension from athletics after a urine sample taken at the Shanghai Diamond League tested positive for oxycodone. Fraser-Pryce insisted that her positive result was due to medication her coach recommended for a toothache, and that she had neglected to properly declare it. Although oxycodone is banned as a narcotic, it is not considered performance enhancing or to be a masking agent. She later stated, "[I'm] supposed to set examples – so whatever it is I put in my body it's up to me to take responsibility for it and I have done that." She resumed competition in January 2011, and her track results from 2010 were nullified.

Fraser-Pryce married Jason Pryce in January 2011, changing her name from Fraser to Fraser-Pryce. She had a late start to her 2011 season, hampered by a calf injury that prevented her from competing at the Jamaican National Championships. Her first international race of the season was at the Prefontaine Classic on June 4, where she finished fourth in 10.95 s behind Carmelita Jeter (who ran a world leading 10.70 s), Marshevet Myers of the U.S. (10.86 s) and Kerron Stewart (10.87 s). She withdrew from the Athletissima track meet in Switzerland at the end of June, and returned on July 19 for the Meeting Sport Solidarietà, where she placed first in 11.11 s.

Ahead of the 2011 World Championships, held in Daegu, South Korea, Fraser-Pryce was not considered the favourite for gold, and her season's best of 10.95 s ranked her the sixth fastest of the year. At the championships, she placed second in her 100 m heat in 11.13 s, then first in her semifinal in 11.03 s. In the world 100 m final, she started quickly but could not maintain the lead, finishing fourth in 10.99 s, and missing the podium by 0.01 s. Gold went to Carmelita Jeter in 10.90 s, while compatriot Veronica Campbell-Brown (10.97 s) and Kelly-Ann Baptiste of Trinidad and Tobago (10.98 s) collected silver and bronze respectively. Fraser-Pryce later ran the lead leg on Jamaica's 4 × 100 m relay team, earning silver behind the United States in a new national record of 41.70 s.

=== 2012: Olympic 100 m title defense ===
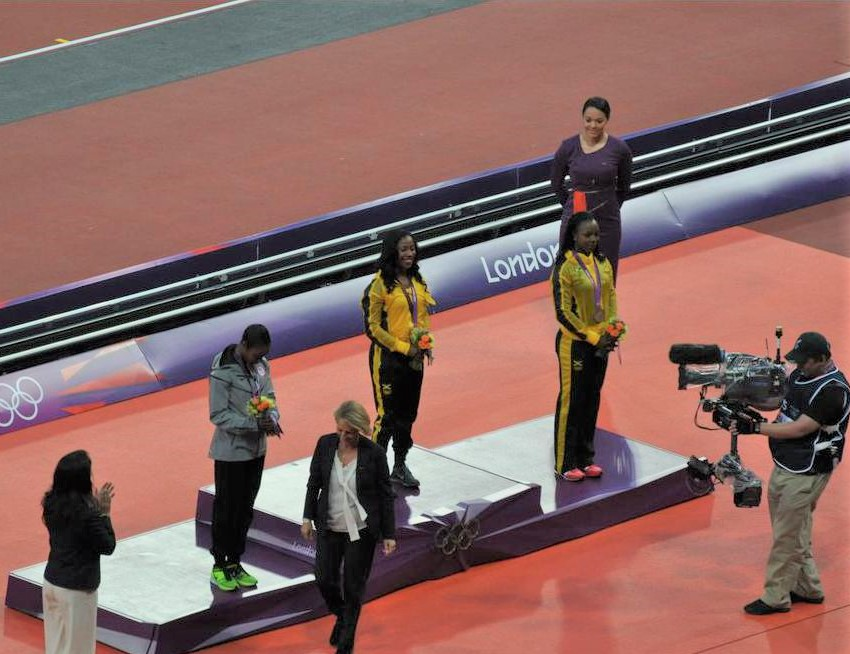
2012 Olympic 100 m medal ceremony: Shelly-Ann Fraser-Pryce (gold), Carmelita Jeter (silver), Veronica Campbell-Brown (bronze).

Beginning with her first Olympic win in 2008, Fraser-Pryce was at the forefront of a sprint rivalry between Jamaica and the United States. At the Beijing Olympics, Jamaica captured five of a possible six gold medals in the sprints, with Fraser-Pryce and Campbell-Brown winning the women's 100 m and 200 m respectively, and Usain Bolt dominating the men's 100 m, 200 m, and 4 × 100 m relay. Jamaica's success continued through the 2009 and 2011 World Championships, highlighted by Bolt's record-breaking performances at each event. Fraser-Pryce's career dip in 2010 and 2011 saw U.S. sprinter Carmelita Jeter rising to prominence in the 100 m, becoming the fastest woman alive (at the time) and clinching the world title in 2011. Fraser-Pryce later described Jeter as one of the toughest rivals she faced throughout her career.

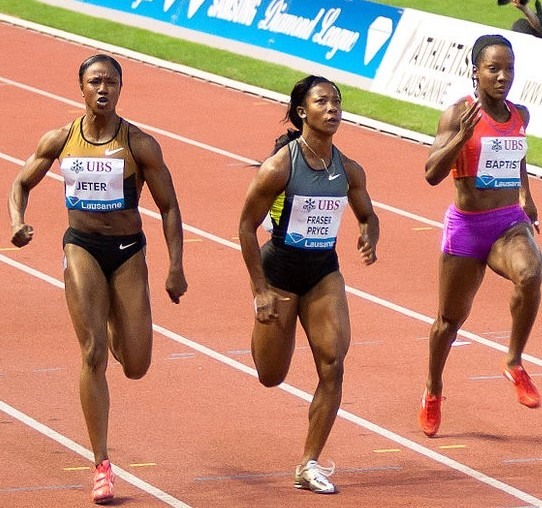
L-R: Carmelita Jeter, Fraser-Pryce and Kelly-Ann Baptiste competing in the 100 m at the Athletissima Diamond League.

Despite a slow start, the 2012 athletics season proved to be one of the most successful for the diminutive sprinter. In May, she posted 11.00 s for third place at the Doha Diamond League, then 11.06 s for second place at the Rome Golden Gala. By June, she was in winning form, cruising to victory at the Adidas Grand Prix in 10.92 s. Weeks later, she won the sprint double at the Jamaican Olympic Trials in Kingston. In the 100 m, she sped to a new personal best (and world lead) of 10.70 s, which improved on the national record she set in 2009 and moved her to fourth on the all-time list of fastest 100 m sprinters. In the 200 m, she defeated the reigning world and Olympic 200 m champion Veronica Campbell-Brown in a career-best 22.10 s. While preparing for the Olympics, she was also completing her Bachelor of Science degree at the University of Technology in Jamaica.

"I had a lot of pressure going into that Olympic Games… I definitely felt relieved crossing that line because I wanted it so bad. I wanted to back up [my 2008 win] to prove that I’m good and that I belong.”

— Fraser-Pryce on defending her Olympic 100 m title.

At the Olympics in London, Fraser-Pryce won her 100 m heat and semifinal in 11.00 s and 10.85 s respectively. She progressed to the final as the second fastest qualifier behind Carmelita Jeter's 10.83 s. In the 100 m final, Fraser-Pryce was quickest from the blocks with Jeter in close pursuit, and she ultimately leaned at the finish line for a narrow victory to defend her title. Her time of 10.75 s was the second fastest in Olympic history at the time, while the race itself was one of the fastest Olympic 100 m finals, placing six women under 11 seconds. Jeter claimed silver in a season's best 10.78 s, and Campbell-Brown earned bronze in 10.81 s. With her win, Fraser-Pryce joined Americans Wyomia Tyus (1964, 1968) and Gail Devers (1992, 1996) as the third woman to defend an Olympic 100 m title. Days later in the 200 m final, Fraser-Pryce lowered her personal best to 22.09 s. However, she was unable to overhaul Allyson Felix of the U.S., who took the gold in 21.88 s. Fraser-Pryce later earned a second silver medal in the 4 × 100 m relay, running alongside Campbell-Brown, Sherone Simpson and Kerron Stewart. Their finishing time of 41.41 s was a new Jamaican record, but well behind the United States' world record of 40.82 s.

Overall, Jamaica had another strong showing in athletics at the 2012 Olympics. In addition to Fraser-Pryce retaining her 100 m title, Bolt also continued his winning streak in the men's events, leading a top-two finish for Jamaica in the 100 m final, a sweep of the podium in the 200 m final, and a new world record in the 4 × 100 m relay. Following the Olympics, Fraser-Pryce closed out her season by taking the 100 m title at the 2012 Diamond League.

=== 2013: Triple gold and IAAF World Athlete of the Year ===
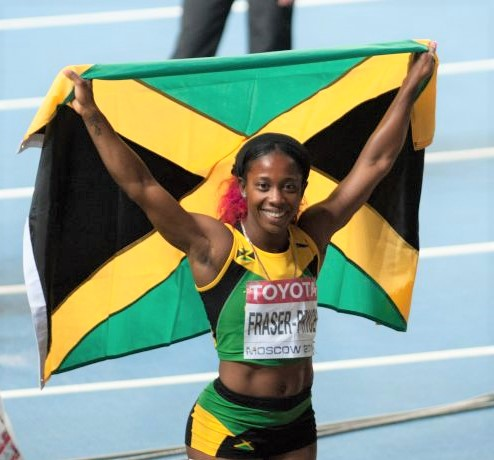
In 2013, Fraser-Pryce became the first woman to sweep the 100 m, 200 m, and 4 × 100 m at the same World Championships.

In 2013, Fraser-Pryce continued to show her consistency when she became the first woman to sweep the 100 m, 200 m and 4 × 100 m at a single World Championship. Her achievements were matched by Usain Bolt in the men's events, giving Jamaica a clean sweep of the sprinting gold medals at the championships. Fraser-Pryce attributed her successful year to an increase in focus on her track career (after finishing school in November 2012) and a new training regimen that emphasised the 200 m. She admitted to previously "hating" the longer sprint, and was hesitant to fully embrace the title of a "100 m/200 m sprinter." However, she explained that her motivation for focusing on the 200 m stemmed from a desire to improve her 100 m performance. She started the season early, recording 11.47 s for an easy win at the Kingston Invitational in January. Over the next few months, she secured Diamond League wins in Shanghai, Eugene, Paris and Doha in both the 100 m and 200 m. In June, she claimed her second consecutive national 200 m title at the Jamaican Championships, setting a new world-leading time of 22.13 s.

At the World Championship, held in Moscow, Fraser-Pryce dominated her 100 m heat and semi-final. In the 100 m final, she surged from the blocks and left her rivals trailing, claiming gold in a new world leading 10.71 s. Her winning margin of 2.2 m ahead of silver medallist Murielle Ahouré of the Ivory Coast (10.93 s) was the largest in World Championship history. Defending world champion Carmelita Jeter, the best placed of the four Americans in the final, collected bronze in 10.94 s. By claiming a second world title, Fraser-Pryce became the first woman to win the 100 m twice at both the Olympics (2008, 2012) and the World Championships (2009, 2013).

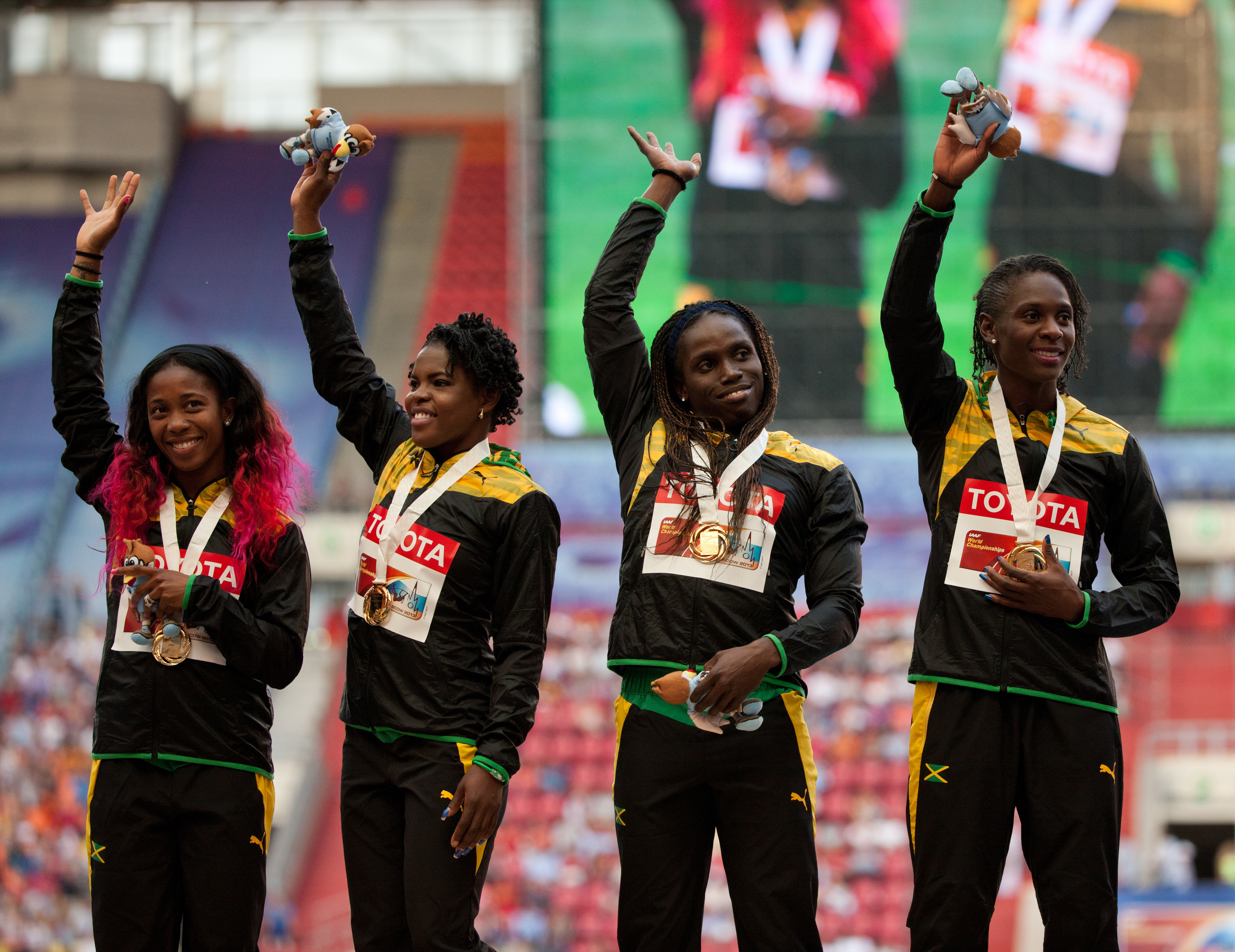
Fraser-Pryce collecting her gold medal alongside her teammates in the 4 × 100 m relay.

In the world 200 m final, Fraser-Pryce's eagerly-awaited showdown with three-time world champion and reigning Olympic champion Allyson Felix failed to materialise, as the American fell to the track early in the race with a hamstring injury. Fraser-Pryce led from the gun, claiming her first global title in this event in 22.17 s. Later, as the anchor for Jamaica's 4 × 100 m relay team, she completed a hat trick of world titles in a new championship record of 41.29 s.

Fraser-Pryce registered the three fastest 100 m times of 2013 and the two fastest in the 200 m. She won six Diamond League races throughout the season (four in the 100 m and two in the 200 m) to clinch the Diamond League titles for both events. Owing to her achievements on the track throughout the season, she was named the IAAF World Athlete of the Year. She is the second Jamaican woman to win this award after Merlene Ottey in 1990.

=== 2014: World indoor champion and injury ===
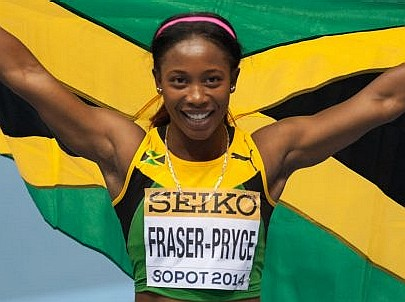
In 2014, Fraser-Pryce became the first woman to hold world titles at 60 m, 100 m, 200 m and 4 × 100 m simultaneously.

On the heels of a successful 2013 season, Fraser-Pryce made her World Indoor Championships debut in Sopot, Poland in March 2014. Early into her 2014 season, she posted 7.11 s in an outdoor 60 m race in Kingston. Months later in Birmingham, she finished second in her only 60 m loss of the season to world 100 m and 200 m silver medallist Murielle Ahouré. She decided to compete at the World Indoor Championships as part of her preparation for her outdoor season.

In Sopot, she won both her heat and semifinal in 7.12 s and 7.08 s respectively. In the 60 m final, she had her usual quick start and finished ahead of Ahouré in a world-leading 6.98 s. Her winning time, which she achieved with no specific preparation for the 60 m, was the fastest at the championships since 1999, and the seventh fastest in history at the time. In claiming gold, she gave Jamaica its fourth 60 m win in the 16-year history of the biennial championships. She also became the first woman in history to hold world titles in the 60 m, 100 m, 200 m and 4 × 100 m at the same time. This was Fraser-Pryce's last outing at an indoor tournament until 2020.

There were no major outdoor championships in 2014. In the Diamond League, she won the 100 m in Doha in early May, posting 11.13 s. However, she struggled with shin splints for the rest of her season, resulting in poor showings on the international circuit. She first withdrew from the Shanghai meet in mid-May, before finishing last in the 200 m at the Prefontaine Classic, then seventh in the 100 m in Rome. Later that month, she competed in the 4 × 200 m relay at the IAAF World Relays, where the Jamaican team finished third in 1:30.04 s, behind the United States (1:29.45 s) and Great Britain (1:29.61 s).

In June, she again withdrew from the Adidas Grand Prix, and returned to the track in July at the Glasgow Grand Prix, where she ran 11.10 s for second place in the 100 m. At the 2014 Commonwealth Games in Glasgow, she ran only in the 4 × 100 m relay, anchoring the Jamaican team to gold in 41.83 s.

=== 2015: Third 100 m world title ===
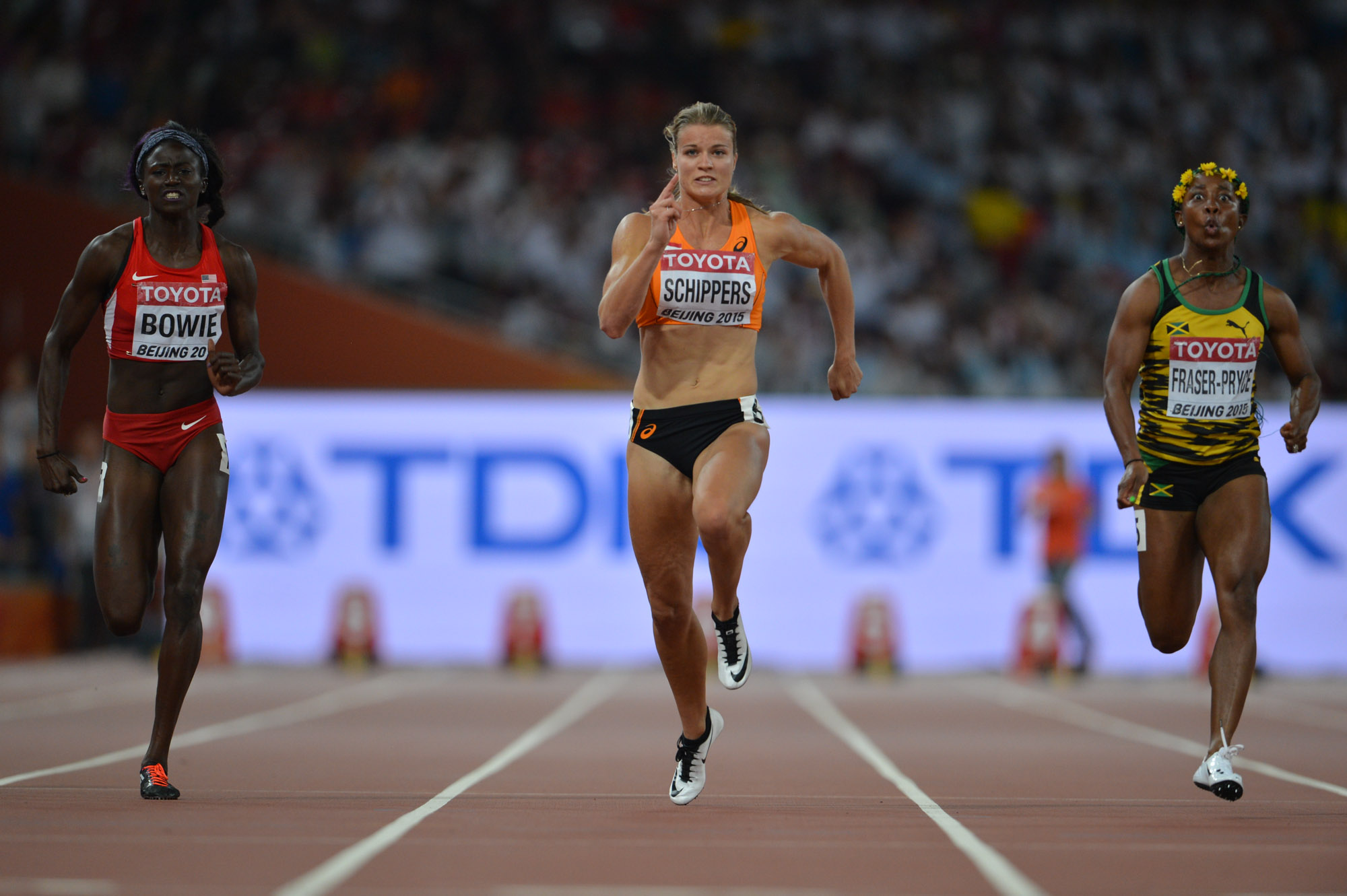
Fraser-Pryce (right), winning the world 100 m final against Dutch sprinter Dafne Schippers (centre) and Tori Bowie of the U.S.

In 2015, Fraser-Pryce decided not to defend her 200 m title at the Beijing World Championships, opting instead to focus on the 100 m for the season. Speaking at the Meeting de Paris in July, she stated that although the longer sprint helped to improve her speed endurance for the 100 m, her coach believed she had lost some of her explosiveness from the blocks. As part of her preparation for the Rio Olympics in 2016, she wanted to prioritize the 100 m for the 2015 season to sharpen her technique. She ran only two 200 m races that year—in two minor meets in Kingston—finishing first and third in 22.96 s and 22.37 s respectively. In the 100 m, she started the season strong, setting an early world lead of 10.81 s at the Prefontaine Classic in May. She lowered the mark to 10.79 s at the Jamaican Championships at the end of June, and a week later, set a new world lead and meet record of 10.74 s in Paris.

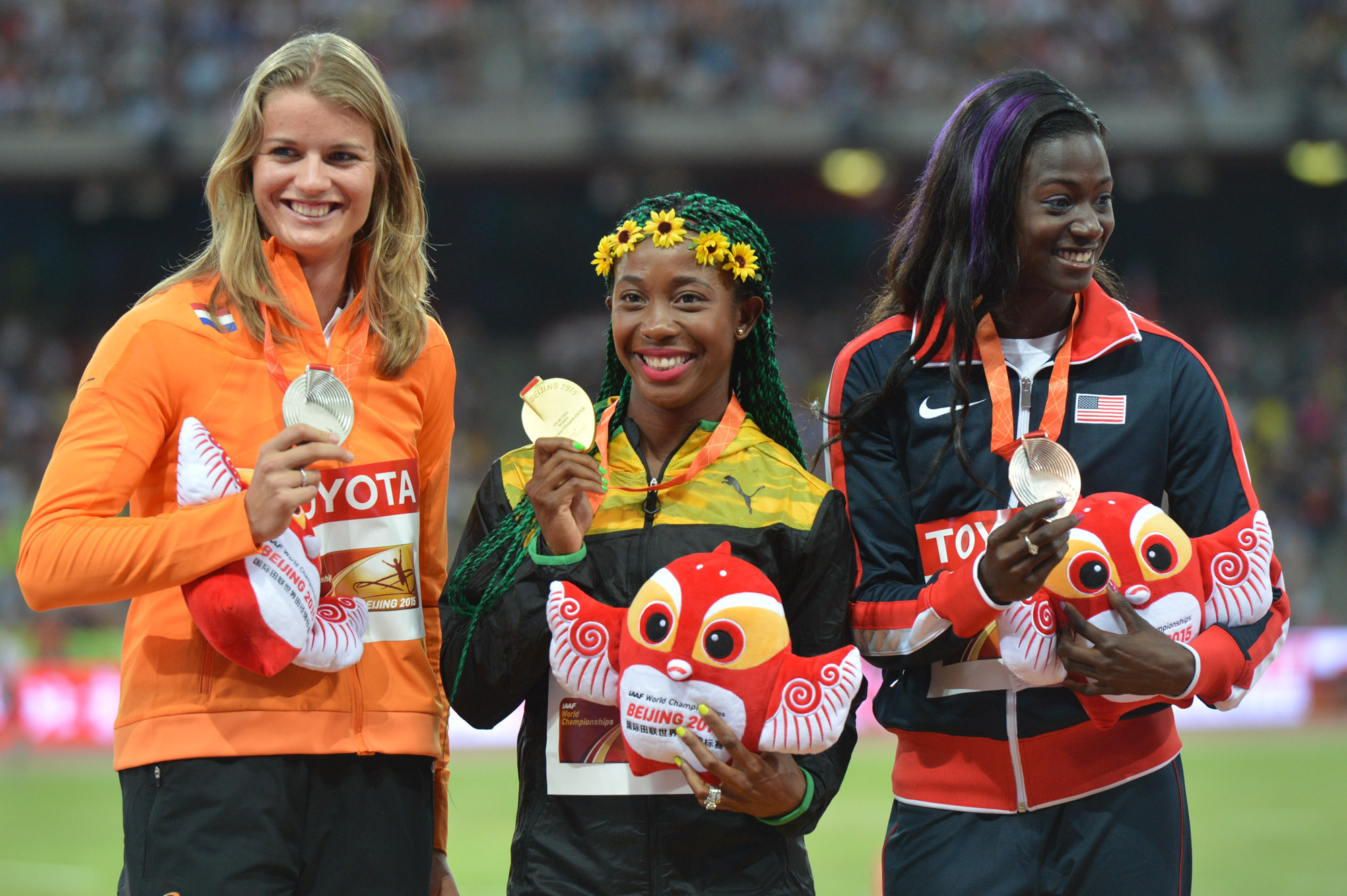
In 2015, Fraser-Pryce (center) became the second woman to defend a world 100 m title, and the first woman to win the title three times.

At the World Championships in August, Fraser-Pyrce posted 10.88 s in her 100 m heat, then 10.82 s to win her semifinal. In the 100 m final, she got her trademark start and sped to a record third world title in 10.76 s, adding to her triumphs in Berlin (2009) and Moscow (2013). Her winning time was also the second fastest in the world for 2015, a mark only she had beaten that year. Dutch sprinter Dafne Schippers—who won silver in 10.81 s—said, "I was close at the end. When you're close to Fraser-Pryce you know you've got a medal." American Tori Bowie earned bronze in 10.86 s. With the victory, Fraser-Pryce became the second woman in history after U.S. sprinter Marion Jones to defend a 100 m world title. She also became the first woman to win the biennial title three times, matching the career hauls of Usain Bolt, as well as Americans Carl Lewis and Maurice Greene. Her victory, achieved at the Beijing National Stadium where she won her maiden Olympic gold in 2008, was also her fifth 100 m title from the past six global championships. Although happy for the win, Fraser-Pryce appeared to be dissatisfied with her time, stating, "I'm getting tired of 10.7s... I definitely think a 10.6 is there. Hopefully I will get it together."

Days after her historic win, Fraser-Pryce anchored the women's 4 × 100 m relay team, consisting of Veronica Campbell-Brown, Natasha Morrison and newcomer Elaine Thompson, to gold. Their 41.07 s was the second fastest time in history and improved on the previous championship record they set in 2013.

In a dominant run of form, Fraser-Pryce went undefeated in ten of her eleven 100 m races throughout 2015. She capped her season with Diamond League wins in Zürich (10.93 s) and Padova (10.98 s) to take the overall 100 m title for the third time in her career.

=== 2016: Injury, Rio Olympics and brief split from coach ===
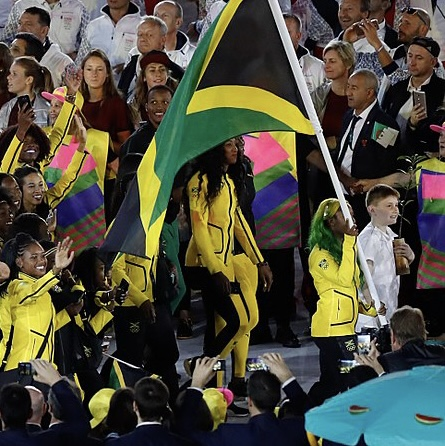
Fraser-Pryce was the flag bearer for Jamaica at the 2016 Rio Olympics.

By 2016, Fraser-Pryce had won 100 m gold at the past two Olympics (2008, 2012) and at three of the past four World Championships (2009, 2013, 2015), becoming the most decorated female sprinter ever in this event. For the upcoming 2016 Rio Olympics, she set her sights on capturing an unprecedented third consecutive Olympic 100 m title. Her season did not go as planned, however, after an onset of sesamoiditis caused chronic pain and inflammation to her big toe, hindering her ability to train or compete. Unable to run in spikes, she withdrew from several events earlier in the year. In her season opener at the Prefontaine Classic in May, she finished last in 11.18 s.

In the weeks before the Olympics, Fraser-Pryce struggled to reach form, clocking 11.25 s in Italy and 11.06 s at the London Grand Prix. Meanwhile, her training partner Elaine Thompson emerged as the top contender for Olympic gold. In July, Thompson ran a world-leading 10.70 s to defeat Fraser-Pryce (10.93 s) at the Jamaican Olympic Trials. In doing so, she also tied Fraser-Pryce's 100 m national record and joined her compatriot at number four on the all-time list. In a highly competitive year that saw many of her rivals post multiple sub-10.90 s times, Fraser-Pryce's lone sub-11 s clocking of 10.93 s ranked her the eighth fastest in the world heading to the Olympics.

"I think 2016 was that year that mentally tested me. Even in training there were so many moments I cried, I was angry, I was upset, I didn't know what to do."

— Fraser-Pryce reflecting on her difficult 2016 season.

At the Olympics in Rio, Fraser-Pryce ran a new season's best of 10.88 s to win her semifinal, qualifying as joint fastest for the final with Thompson. However, she was in visible discomfort after her semifinal, crying and limping off the track. In the 100 m final, she had a quick start and finished in a season's best 10.86 s, winning the bronze. Thompson secured Jamaica's third successive 100 m Olympic gold in 10.71 s, while Tori Bowie earned silver in 10.83 s. Although she fell short of defending her Olympic crown, Fraser-Pryce revealed that she had exceeded her own expectations, describing her hard-fought bronze medal as her "greatest ever." Closing out the Olympics, she collected a silver medal as part of the women's 4 × 100 m relay team in a season's best 41.36 s. The United States claimed their second consecutive gold in this event in 41.01 s.

After the Olympics, Fraser-Pryce briefly parted ways with longtime coach Stephen Francis, whom she shared with Thompson. At the end of August, Francis disclosed that Fraser-Pryce was unhappy with their preparation for the Olympics, and had expressed a lack of confidence in his training programme. He also alluded to her dissatisfaction over the years with being unable to surpass her 10.70 s personal best (set in 2012). However, with no official statement, Fraser-Pryce and her coach reconciled and she resumed training at the MVP Track Club in November of that year.

=== 2017–2018: Motherhood and comeback ===
In early 2017, Fraser-Pryce announced that she was pregnant and would not be defending her title at the 2017 World Championships in London. She went into labour while watching the world 100 m final that year, and gave birth to her son Zyon the next day via emergency C-section. Despite expectations that she would retire after becoming a mother, she publicly promised a major comeback. She returned to training within eleven weeks. However, her early sessions were more challenging than she had anticipated. Due to her C-section, she required special compression bandages to help stabilise her stomach during training. She was unable to train her core or lift heavy weights, and frequently had to take time off due to the pain. At times, she doubted if she could ever return to peak form: "I [wondered] whether my body would allow me to put the level of work in to get it done.”

"I'm so passionate, hungry, and determined. I want it to be an absolutely amazing comeback and I'm so caught up in it — it goes in my head over and over."

— Fraser-Pryce on her return to track and field.

Fraser-Pryce returned to the track in May 2018, nine months after giving birth, winning the 100 m at the Kingston All Comers Meet in 11.52 s. The next month, she ran 11.33 s for second place at the Cayman Invitational, then 11.10 s to win the JN Racers Grand Prix back in Kingston. In the 100 m final at the Jamaican Championships, she had a quick start but finished second to double Olympic champion Elaine Thompson in a season's best 11.09 s. In July she took to the international circuit for several Diamond League meets, all while breastfeeding for her first 15 months after giving birth. She competed in the Spitzen Leichtathletik Luzern and the Galà dei Castelli in Switzerland, finishing fifth (11.22 s) and second (11.15 s) respectively.

Now self-branded the "mommy rocket", Fraser-Pryce took a more relaxed approach to her training, stating that motherhood not only changed her perspective, but had given her newfound motivation to compete. Although she was optimistic about her return to peak form, one of her biggest hurdles was rebuilding her core strength (hampered by her C-section) to recapture her explosiveness from the blocks. In July 2018, on her ninth race since returning to competition, she finally broke 11 s, clocking 10.98 s to win at the London Grand Prix. She later competed in the 4 × 100 m at the 2018 Athletics World Cup, helping the Jamaican team win silver behind Great Britain. In August, she ran 11.18 s for fifth place at the Toronto NACAC Championships, then earned silver behind the United States in the 4 × 100 m relay.

=== 2019: Fourth 100 m world title ===
After returning from maternity leave, Fraser-Pryce ran the fastest 60 m split of all time (6.81 s) on her way to claiming her fourth 100 m world title.

After ending her 2018 season ranked 10th in the world in the 100 m, Fraser-Pryce made steady progress with her training into the 2019 season. At the Jamaican Championships in June, she again finished second to Elaine Thompson in both the 100 m and the 200 m. However, the 100 m final ended with both sprinters sharing the world-leading time of 10.73 s, and Thompson declared the winner in a photo finish. It was the first race in history in which two women finished inside 10.75 s; Fraser-Pryce's 10.73 s in this race also became the fastest non-winning time in history (at the time).

"We need to put [Fraser-Pryce's] 100 m career into perspective. 2 × Olympic 100 champ. Only 2 other women have ever done that. 4 × World Champ 100. No other woman has ever done that. And 100m is one of the most difficult events to repeat as champion! Undisputed G.O.A.T. (Greatest of all time)."

— Retired Olympian Michael Johnson on Fraser-Pryce's 2019 win.

Fraser-Pryce returned to the top of women's sprinting for the remainder of the 2019 season, running at close to personal best times in the 100 m. She recorded three of the five fastest times of the year, including a 10.78 s at the London Grand Prix and 10.74 s at the Lausanne Diamond League. In August, she won 200 m gold at the 2019 Pan American Games, setting a new championship record of 22.43 s. However, after losing to Thompson at the Jamaican Championships in June, the two did not meet until the 2019 Doha World Championships, in one of the event's most highly anticipated showdowns.

In Doha, Fraser-Pryce cruised to 10.80 s in the 100 m heats, the fastest first-round time in World Championships history. She followed with 10.81 s in the semifinal, the fastest qualifying time ahead of the final. In the 100 m final, she outpaced the field from the start, powering away to her fourth title in a world-leading 10.71 s—her fastest time since 2013. Her teammate and rival Thompson finished fourth in 10.93 s. It was the first time Fraser-Pryce had defeated Thompson in their six career matchups. With this achievement, Fraser-Pryce became the oldest woman ever and first mother since Gwen Torrence at the 1995 World Championships to claim a 100 m global title. She took particular satisfaction in her win, calling it "a victory for motherhood," and brought her two-year-old son on her victory lap around the stadium. Days later, she added another gold medal to her collection by running the second leg of the Jamaican 4 × 100 m relay team, her ninth world title overall. She had also planned to contest the 200 m final, but later withdrew.

=== 2020–2021: New coach and Tokyo Olympics ===
Fraser-Pryce kickstarted her season in February on the indoor circuit, winning the 60 m at the Muller Indoor Athletics Grand Prix in 7.16 s. It was her first indoor competition since she won gold in Sopot back in 2014. The rest of her 2020 season was inhibited by the COVID-19 pandemic, which also led to the postponement of the Tokyo Olympics until 2021. In August 2020, she ran 100 m times of 10.87 s and 10.86 s in local track meets in Kingston, ending her season as the second fastest of the year behind Elaine Thompson's 10.85 s. In the 200 m, she held a season's best of 22.57 s, the sixth fastest in the world for the year.

In May 2020, it was reported that Fraser-Pryce had left the MVP Track Club, and had started training under the guidance of Reynaldo Walcott. Walcott had previously worked with Stephen Francis at the MVP Track Club and was now the head coach at the St. Elizabeth Technical High School. Fraser-Pryce trained briefly with Walcott after parting ways with Francis in 2016, but later returned to MVP in November of that year.

Fraser-Pryce opened her 2021 season in late May at the Müller Grand Prix Gateshead, posting 11.51 s for fourth place in cold, wet and windy conditions. Days later, she placed first at the Doha Diamond League in 10.84 s. On June 5, 2021, she ran a new personal best, a new world lead and new Jamaican record of 10.63 s at the JAAA Olympic Destiny Series meet in Kingston, becoming the fastest woman alive (at the time). The quickest 100 m in over 33 years, her 10.63 s improved on the previous national record of 10.70 s that she shared with Elaine Thompson-Herah, and placed her ahead of American sprinters Carmelita Jeter (10.64 s) and Marion Jones (10.65 s). Fraser-Pryce told reporters, "I’m at a loss for words because 10.6 has been a dream, a goal. I’ve been working so hard, been so patient and to see it finally unfold, I’m just ecstatic." At the Jamaican Olympic Trials at the end of June, Fraser-Pryce won the 100 m title in 10.71 s, ahead of Shericka Jackson (10.82 s) and defending national champion Elaine Thompson-Herah (10.84 s). She also won the 200 m national title in a new personal best of 21.79 s, beating her previous career best of 22.09 s from 2012.

"My coach was talking to me so much about nailing my start… I was overthinking it, and I had a slight stumble on my third step and just panicked. I ran the worst race that I could have ran, and I felt like I never gave myself the chance to compete in the best way I could.”

— Fraser-Pryce on her second place finish in the women’s 100 m Olympic final.

In a Jamaican sweep of the podium in the Olympic 100 m final, Fraser-Pryce finished second behind defending champion Thompson-Herah in 10.74 s. Jackson secured the bronze in a personal best 10.76 s. Thompson-Herah's winning time of 10.61 s was a new Olympic record, a new national record and moved her ahead of Fraser-Pryce as the fastest woman alive. By winning her fourth consecutive Olympic medal in the 100 m, Fraser-Pryce set the record for the most medals won in the event by any athlete. In the 200 m final, Fraser-Pryce placed fourth in 21.94 s, the fastest ever time for that place. In the 4 × 100 m relay final, Jamaica secured gold in a national record 41.02 s, ahead of the U.S. (41.45 s) and Great Britain (41.88 s).

At the Lausanne Diamond League in August, Fraser-Pryce ran a new 100 m personal best of 10.60 s (the third fastest time ever, at the time) to beat Thompson-Herah, whose 10.64 s became the fastest non-winning time in history. Motivated by her achievement, Fraser-Pryce said, “Believe it or not I still have not run my best race. I know there is more to give because I still need to work on perfecting my technique.”

=== 2022: Fifth 100 m world title ===
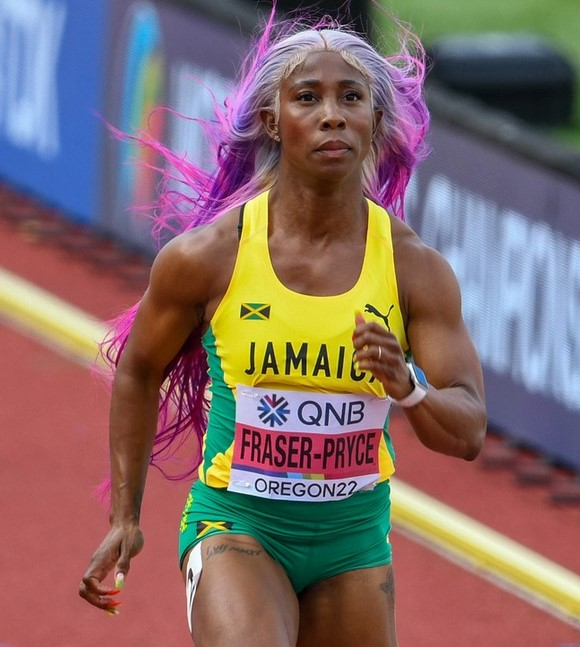
Fraser-Pryce has won seven 100 m titles between the Olympics and World Championships, surpassing Usain Bolt for the most global titles won in this event.

By 2022, the sprinting landscape had changed. Many of Fraser-Pryce's contemporaries, including Usain Bolt, Carmelita Jeter, Kerron Stewart and Veronica Campbell-Brown, had retired from the sport. Although the U.S. men regained sprinting prominence in the post-Bolt era, Jamaica maintained its dominance in the women's events. Women's sprinting also began to take centre stage in athletics due in large part to the fierce rivalry between Fraser-Pryce and Thompson-Herah, as well as the rise of American sprinter Sha'Carri Richardson. Fraser-Pryce and Thompson-Herah became the two fastest women alive in 2021, and their performances throughout the season reignited the conversations around Florence Griffith Joyner's long-standing 100 m and 200 m world records.

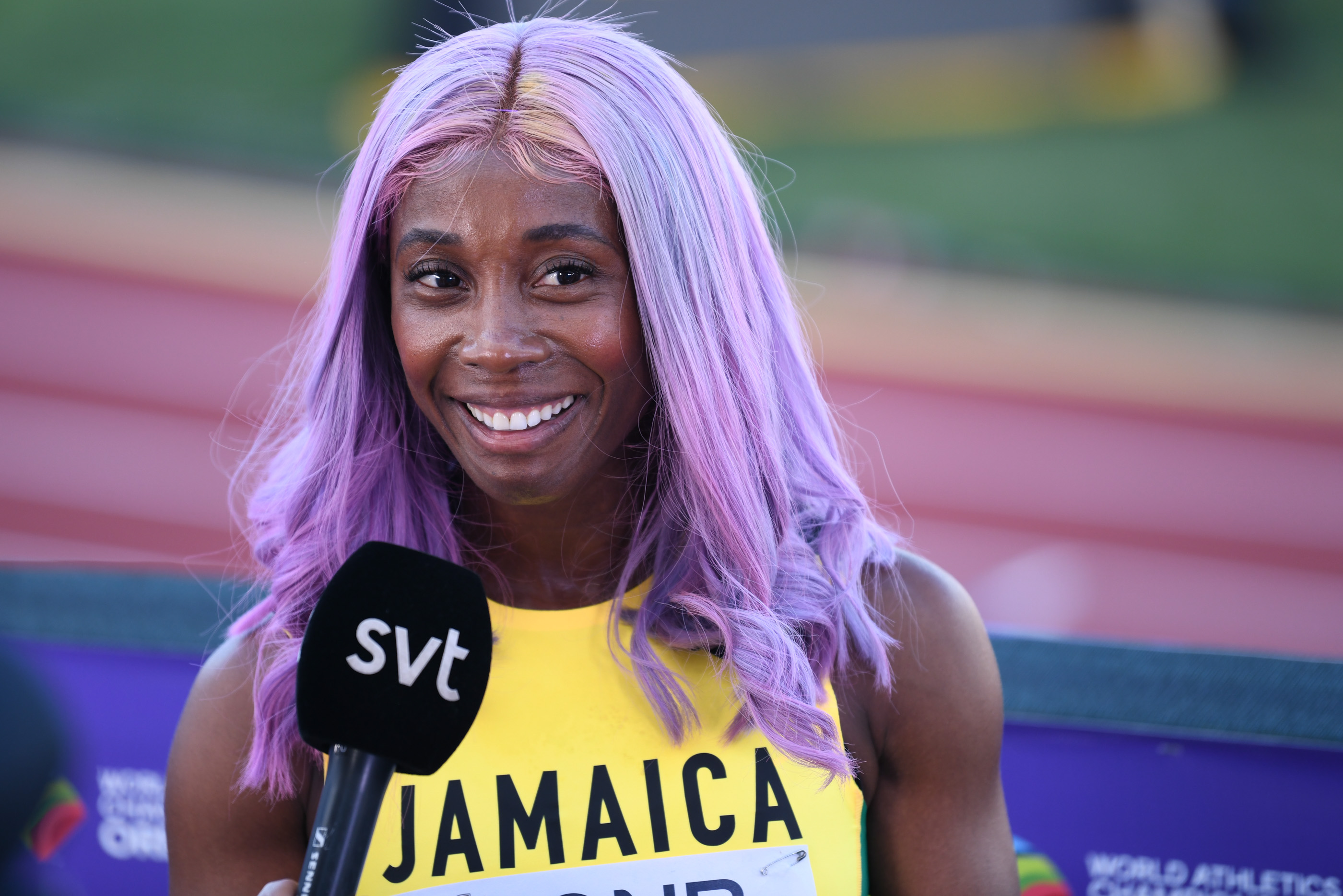
Fraser-Pryce at the 2022 World Athletics Championships in Eugene, Oregon.

At the beginning of the 2021 season, Fraser-Pryce stated that she was planning to retire after the Tokyo Olympics. However, after setting new 100 m and 200 m personal bests that year, she decided to put her retirement plans on hold. For 2022, the 35 year old was more selective with her races due to the physical demands on her body. She opened her season on May 7 at the Kip Keino Classic, running a world-leading 10.67 s at altitude in Nairobi, Kenya. It was the fastest season opener by a female sprinter in history. At the Prefontaine Classic at the end of May, she also won the 200 m in a season's best 22.41 s. On June 18, she ran her second 100 m of the season at the Meeting de Paris, equalling her 10.67 s season's best from Nairobi. At the Jamaican Championships in June, Fraser-Pryce won her 100 m heat in 10.70 s. However, she skipped the semi-final and final, having received automatic qualification for the World Championships as the defending champion. In the 200 m, she finished third in 22.14 s, behind Elaine Thompson-Herah (22.05 s), and Shericka Jackson (21.55 s).

At the World Athletics Championships in July, Fraser-Pryce led another Jamaican sweep of the podium for a record-extending fifth 100 m title. Her winning time of 10.67 s was her quickest 100 m in a global final, and broke the championship record of 10.70 s, set in 1999 by Marion Jones. Jackson ran a personal best of 10.73 s for silver, and Thompson-Herah clocked 10.81 s for bronze. The race was one of the fastest in World Championships history—seven of the eight finalists dipped under 11 seconds and achieved best-ever marks for fourth, sixth and seventh. Fraser-Pryce's win came almost 14 years after her first global 100 m title, making her the oldest ever world champion in any individual track event. In the world 200 m final, Fraser-Pryce ran a season's best 21.81 s to take silver behind Jackson's 21.45 s. In the 4 × 100 m relay final, the U.S. team defeated Jamaica in an upset, winning gold in 41.14 s ahead of Jamaica's 41.18 s.

"I feel blessed to have this talent and to continue to do it at 35, having a baby, still going, and hopefully inspiring women that they can make their own journey."

— Fraser-Pryce after winning her fifth 100 m world title.

After the World Championships, Fraser-Pryce continued her form throughout the season. On August 6, she ran a new world leading 10.66 s at the Kamila Skolimowska Memorial in Poland, followed by a 10.67 s at the Gyulai István Memorial in Hungary two days later. On August 10, she again lowered her world lead to 10.62 s at the Monaco Diamond League, running her third 10.6 in a 5-day span. Fraser-Pryce withdrew from the Lausanne Diamond League at the end of August due to hamstring discomfort, and returned for the Memorial Van Damme a week later, where she finished second to Jackson (10.73 s to 10.74 s) in her only 100 m loss of the year. She capped her season at the Diamond League final in Zurich, winning her fourth 100 m Diamond trophy (her fifth trophy overall) in a meeting record 10.65 s.

Fraser-Pryce ended the season as the number-one overall female athlete across all disciplines, according to World Athletics. She ran 100 m times of 10.62, 10.65, 10.66, 10.67 on four occasions, and 10.70 s, recording the eight fastest times of the year. She's the first woman to break 10.70 s seven times in a single season and nine total times in their career. She's the first woman to run sub-10.70 s races more than four times in their career. In the 200 m, she recorded two of the ten fastest times of the year (21.81 s and 21.82 s), and was the third ranked female sprinter over the distance in 2022.

=== 2023: Injuries and world 100 m bronze ===
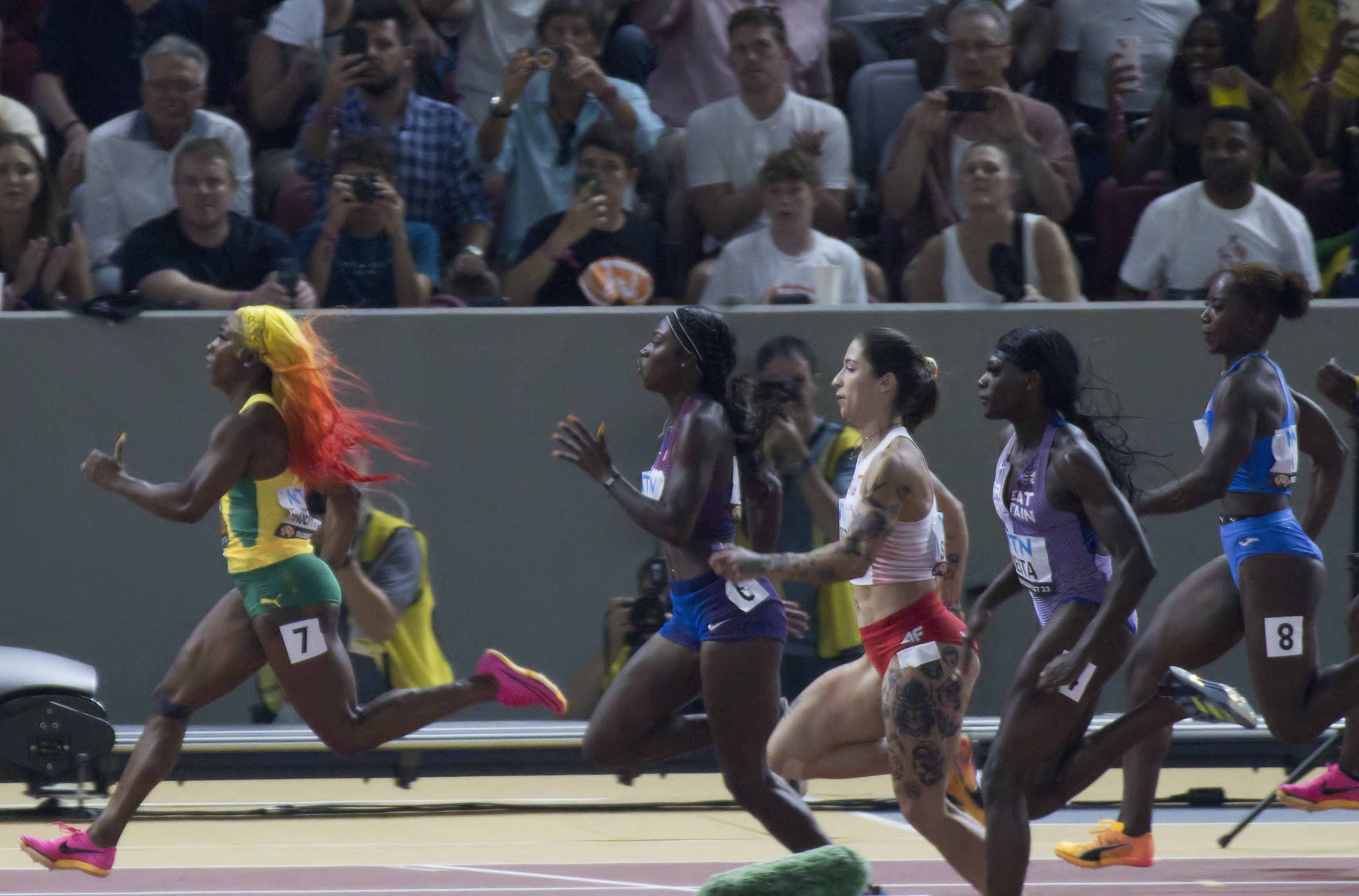
Fraser-Pryce winning the 100 m semi-final at the 2023 Budapest World Athletics Championships.

For her 2022 season, Fraser-Pryce won the 2023 Laureus World Sports Awards for Sportswoman of the Year. She was expected to open her 2023 season at the Botswana Golden Grand Prix on April 29, but withdrew shortly before the event due to an undisclosed family emergency. In early May, she was slated to appear at the Kip Keino Classic in Nairobi, Kenya, where she ran her world leading 10.67 s season opener in 2022. However, a few days before the event, she suffered a knee injury during her warmup, and left Kenya to seek treatment. She remained out of competition for the next few months, opening her season at the Jamaican Championships on July 8, a month before the Budapest World Championships. As the defending world 100 m champion, she had automatic qualification for the championships in Budapest. She competed only in the 200 m at the Jamaican Championships, finishing second in 22.26 s behind world 200 m champion Shericka Jackson.

Fraser-Pryce opened her 100 m season on July 20, running 10.82 s at the Spitzen Leichtathletik Luzern in Switzerland. On July 22, she competed at the Meeting Madrid, clocking 10.83 s. Having competed in only two 100 m races for the year, she entered the World Championships as one of the main medal contenders, but faced a stacked field that included compatriot Shericka Jackson, who sat atop the world rankings with 10.65 s; American Sha'Carri Richardson, who had been dominating the European Diamond League circuit and held a season's best of 10.71 at the time; and Marie-Josée Ta Lou, whose season's best was 10.75 s.

At the World Championships, Fraser-Pryce won her heat in 11.01 s, and her semifinal in 10.89 s. In the world 100 m final, she finished in a season's best 10.77 s to claim the bronze medal. Jackson won silver in 10.72 s, while Richardson won gold in a championship record 10.65 s. It was the first world 100 m gold for the U.S. since the late Tori Bowie won gold at the 2017 London World Championships. In the 4 × 100 m final, Fraser-Pryce sustained a hamstring injury while running the second leg. However, she held on to complete the baton change, helping the Jamaican team of Natasha Morrison, Shashalee Forbes and Jackson win silver in a season's best 41.21 s. Due to her injuries, Fraser-Pryce was forced to end her season after the Budapest World Championships.

=== 2024: Paris Olympics ===
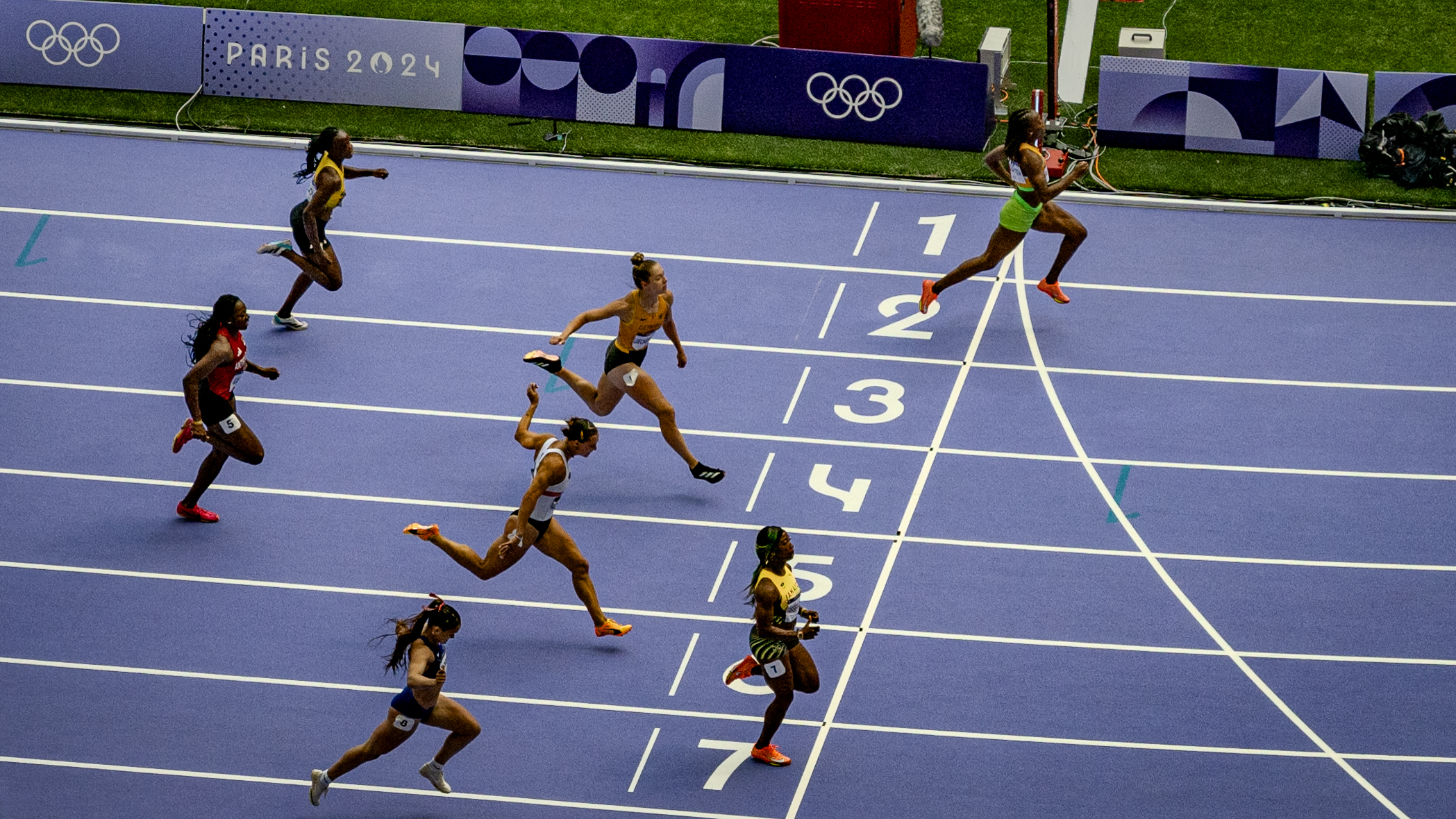
Fraser-Pryce finished second in her 100 m heat at the Paris Olympics.

In 2023, Fraser-Pryce stated that she would no longer compete in the 200 m: “I’ll just focus on the 100 m. The double is very... strenuous. The workload that you need to do it is definitely hard.” In February 2024, the 37-year-old announced that the Paris Olympics would be her final Olympics.

Battling a long-standing knee injury, Fraser-Pryce remained out of competition for most of the year. In mid-June, she opened her season at the French Foray meet, held in Kingston, winning the 100 m in 11.15 s. She showed improved form at the Jamaican Olympic Trials at the end of June, where she ran 10.94 s to secure third place and an individual spot for her fifth Olympics.

In Paris, Fraser-Pryce finished second in her 100 m heat in 10.92 s. She later withdrew from her 100 m semi-final.

=== 2025: Final global championships and retirement ===
In early 2025, Fraser-Pryce announced that the 2025 season would be her last as a professional sprinter.

She opened her season in April, winning her heat at the MVP Velocity Fest 17 meet in Kingston, in a wind-assisted time of 10.94 s. At the World Relays in Guangzhou, she was part of the Jamaican quartet that won a bronze medal in the 4 × 100 m relay. At the Jamaican Championships, Fraser-Pryce finished third in the 100 m, running a season's best of 10.91 s. On 12 August, she finished fourth over 100 m at the Gyulai Istvan Memorial in Budapest, clocking a time of 11.07 s. She also finished fourth at the Brussels Diamond League, running 11.17 s.

"I have had an amazing career and today's medal is the icing on the cake. My son will be excited. Today is a full circle moment for me, I was a reserve at my first World Championships in Japan in 2007. I couldn't have it any other way. I have some plans and I want to focus on advocacy, and support women and athletes. I want to continue to make an impact"

— Fraser-Pryce after her final race.

At the World Championships in Tokyo, Fraser-Pryce finished sixth in the 100 m final in her final individual race. In the 4 × 100 m relay, she won a silver medal, alongside her teammates Tia Clayton, Tina Clayton and Jonielle Smith.

== Legacy and achievements ==
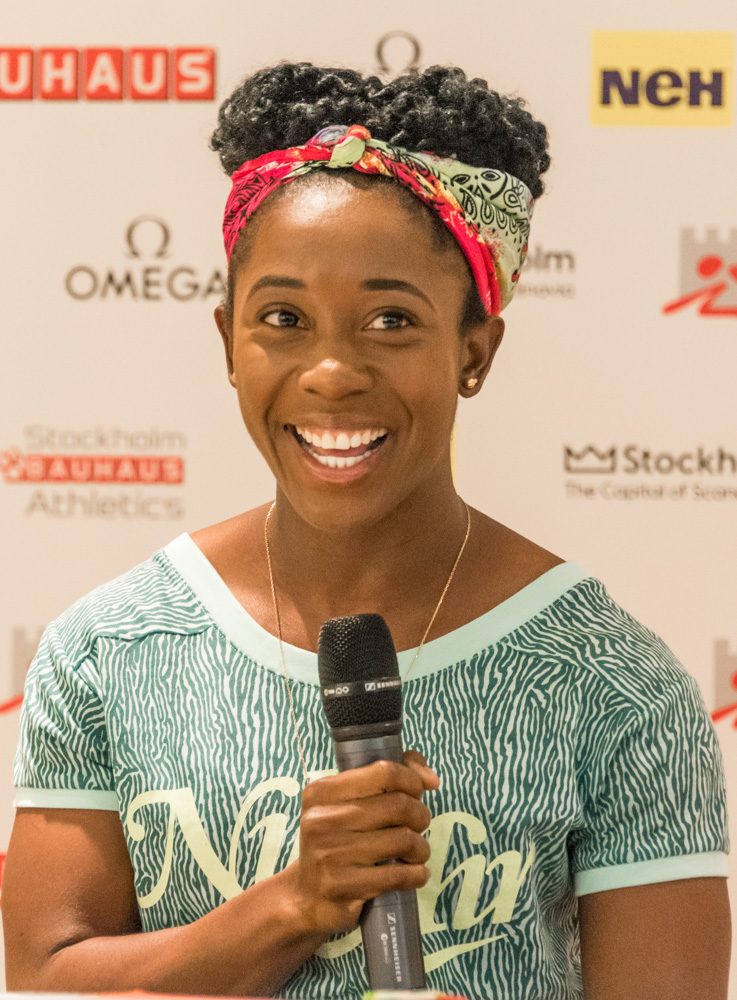
Fraser-Pryce at the 2015 BAUHAUS-galan Diamond League in Stockholm.

Fraser-Pryce is widely recognized as one of the greatest sprinters of all time. In 2022, British sports radio station Talksport ranked her as the greatest female sprinter of the 21st century and the fourth greatest overall female athlete, behind Brazilian soccer player Marta, American gymnast Simone Biles and tennis player Serena Williams. The second fastest woman alive, the Olympic Channel also referred to Fraser-Pryce as "the most successful female sprinter in history". Track & Field News listed her at number one on their annual world 100 m rankings in 2008, 2012, 2013, 2015, 2019 and 2022 (she also appeared in the top 10 in 2009, 2011, 2016 and 2021). In the 200 m, they ranked her at number one in 2013, number two in 2012 and 2022, and the top 10 in 2011 and 2019. In 2020, they ranked her as the top female 100 m sprinter of the 2010s decade, as well as the fifth greatest in the 200 m. She was also ranked at number two in the 100 m for the 2000s decade. Sean Ingle of The Guardian lauded her achievements after the 2019 World Championships, stating that she had "legitimate claim to be considered the greatest ever." After her record-extending fifth 100 m world title in 2022, he asked, "Who would now dare doubt that she is the greatest female sprinter of them all?" In 2020, after her maternity leave and return, World Athletics included her on their list of the 10 greatest comebacks in track and field.

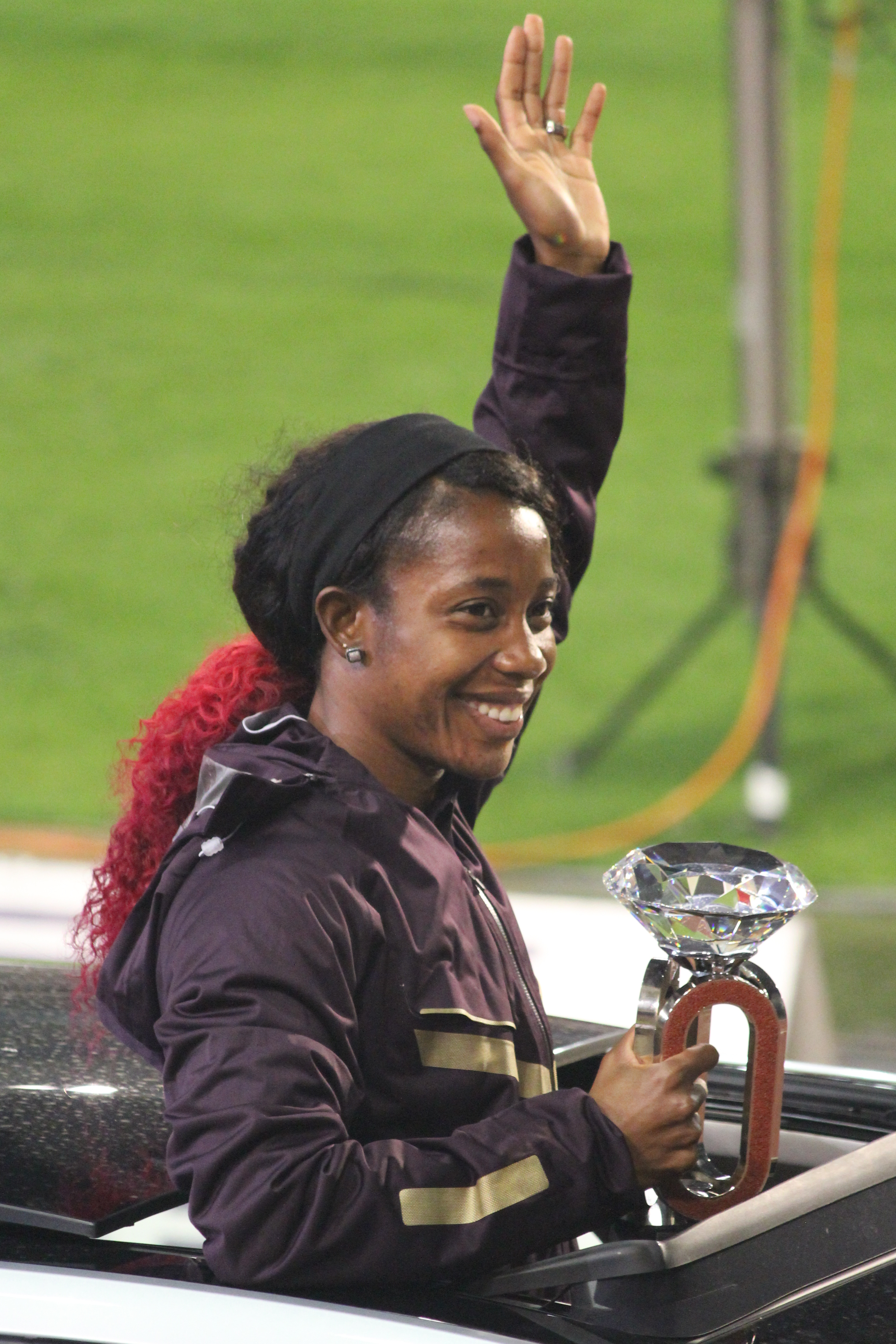
Fraser-Pryce with her Diamond League trophy in 2013. She has won the trophy five times: once in the 200 m (2013) and a record four times in the 100 m (2012, 2013, 2015 and 2022).

Fraser-Pryce has been praised for her consistency at major championships and for her longevity. Of the 10 Olympic or World 100 m titles she contested between 2008 and 2022, she has won seven gold medals, a silver and a bronze, missing a global 100 m podium only once in her career. Of the four 200 m titles she contested, she has won gold and silver at the World Championships, as well as an Olympic silver medal. In 2014, her then coach Stephen Francis stated that she had "mastered the trick of staying good," adding, "It’s far easier to get good than to stay good... a lot of natural factors mitigate against you staying at number one, but [she has] developed a mindset that keeps her where she is." Sports journalist Morgan Campbell of CBC Sports attributed Fraser-Pryce's longevity to a combination of talent and coaching, improvements in diet, nutrition and sports science, as well as increased sponsorship in athletics, which incentivizes athletes to continue competing at the highest level. In 2022, retired American sprinter Michael Johnson called Fraser-Pryce and Elaine Thompson-Herah the two greatest female sprinters of all time, adding, "Her longevity is extremely impressive...and I think it's often underrated. She's lived in the shadow of Usain Bolt... They both won their first Olympic titles in the same year—2008. He's long since retired and she's still going, she's had a child, come back, and run even faster. It's a testament to her greatness — her longevity and consistency is amazing in an event that is so difficult."

As of September 2022, Fraser-Pryce has run the most sub-10.70 s times with nine, the most sub-10.80 s times with 31, the most sub-10.90 s times with 53, and the most sub-11 s times with 78. She has won all of her global championship titles with sub-10.80 performances. In a single season, she has tallied the most sub-10.70 s clockings (seven in 2022), ahead of Elaine Thompson-Herah (four in 2021) and Florence Griffith Joyner (three in 1988). She's also registered the most sub-10.80 s clockings in a single season (nine in 2022), tied with Marion Jones (nine in 1998), and ahead of Elaine Thompson-Herah (eight in 2021). With her personal best of 10.60 s, set in 2021 at the age of 34, Fraser-Pryce is the third fastest woman of all time. In 2019 she became the fourth mother to win a global 100 m title, joining Gwen Torrence and Wilma Rudolph of the U.S. and Dutch sprinter Fanny Blankers-Koen. With her fifth world title, Fraser-Pryce also extended her lead over Usain Bolt and Americans Carl Lewis and Maurice Greene, who each have three World Championship titles in the 100 m.

I don't pay much attention to where I fall in history. When I decide to leave the sport, I want to leave it better than I saw it. I want to make sure that other young athletes can see that you need to work hard, stay humble...and stay focused, and the sky is the limit.

— Fraser-Pryce on her legacy in track and field.

Ask the average person to name the top five female sportspeople in the world and it’s unlikely many will include Shelly-Ann Fraser-Pryce. Such is the shame of being a Jamaican sprinter whose career ran in tandem with Usain Bolt’s. But in truth the 34-year-old should rank right up there with the likes of Simone Biles, Katie Ledecky and Naomi Osaka — she’s that level of sporting royalty. In the most popular event in the most universal sport, Fraser-Pryce has won two Olympic titles (2008 and 2012), four [sic] world titles (2009, 2013, 2015, 2019) and that’s before we get to relays.

— Sports writer Cathal Dennehy on Fraser-Pryce’s impact on track and field.

Despite her success, her profile on a global scale during her early career was largely eclipsed by countryman Usain Bolt. On the eve of the 2016 Olympics, The Washington Post alluded to this disparity with the headline "A Jamaican will go for a third gold medal in Rio — and it’s not who you think." Likewise, CNN wrote that Fraser-Pryce had matched Bolt "medal for medal over 100 m" at each global championship, but "somehow, that isn't common knowledge." While critical of the gender gap in athletics, Fraser-Pryce insisted that she has never felt overshadowed. She also asserted that the near-unattainable women's 100 m world record and the lack of consistently fast times in women's sprinting contributed to the imbalance: "I have always said it's a man's world...[but] when you have male athletes [running]... 9.5s as opposed to female athletes running 10.8s, there is no 'wow' to the event." In 2019, sports writer Steve Keating declared Fraser-Pryce the new face of athletics, stating that the birth of her son and her determination to return to the top added to her legacy.

After her triple gold medal win at the 2013 World Championships, Fraser-Pryce stated that fellow athletes were critical of her success, with some suggesting that she had used performance-enhancing drugs. Although she achieved world-leading times in both the 100 m and 200 m in 2013, she denied using banned substances, pointing out that her times have been consistent with previous seasons. In November 2013, she threatened to boycott international competitions, citing the lacklustre approach of Jamaica's Athletics Administrative Authority in defending Jamaican athletes against such "hurtful" accusations.

In 2019, Fraser-Pryce published the children's book I Am a Promise, based on the life lessons she learned growing up and competing as an athlete.

=== Awards and recognition ===
In 2008, Fraser-Pryce was honoured with the Order of Distinction for her achievements in athletics. In October 2018, she was also honoured with a statue at the Jamaica National Stadium in Kingston, Jamaica. During the ceremony, Minister of Sports Olivia Grange hailed her a role model for young girls and a Jamaican "modern-day hero." In 2022, Fraser-Pryce's Order of Distinction was upgraded to Order of Jamaica, which she received "for outstanding performance in the field of Athletics at the International Level." In December 2022, The Penwood Church of Christ Early Childhood Institution, which she attended, was renamed The Shelly-Ann Fraser-Pryce Early Childhood Institution, in her honor.

The recipient of many accolades in Jamaica, she has won the JAAA's Golden Cleats Award for Female Athlete of the Year four times: 2009, 2012, 2013 and 2015. She has also received the Jamaican Sportswoman of the Year award five times: 2012, 2013, 2015, 2019 and 2022.

On the international scene, she won the Laureus World Sports Award for Sportswoman of the Year in 2023, and was nominated in 2010, 2013, 2014, 2016 and 2019. After she completed the sprint triple at the 2013 Moscow World Championships, she was named IAAF World Female Athlete of the Year, becoming the first Jamaican woman to win since Merlene Ottey in 1990. In accepting her award, she exclaimed, "I'm shocked and excited. It's something that has been a dream of mine." In December 2019, she won Best Female Athlete at the inaugural Panam Sports Awards.

== Technique and running style ==
The start of the 2009 world 100 m final. Fraser-Pryce (third from right) achieved a 1 m lead over the rest of the field by 20 m into the race. Between 20 and 40 m, she averaged 4.91 stride cycles per second.

Under the guidance of her coach Stephen Francis, and later Reynaldo Walcott, Fraser-Pryce honed her technique to become one of the most decorated track athletes of all time. She stated that none of her technique came naturally, and that when she began competing, she ran with an exaggerated forward lean: "I had a really bad running posture, like I ran, literally, dropping on my face. Stephen saw all of this and, as a coach, he analyzed and he took a year to actually go through my core needs." By 2008, she had improved her posture and sharpened her start, including her first stride, the placement of her arms and the different phases of the sprint. Over time, she became more confident in her technique: "You feel all of your phases, like a sixth sense. So I focus on nailing each phase properly, and if I’m able to, then I know that’s history.”

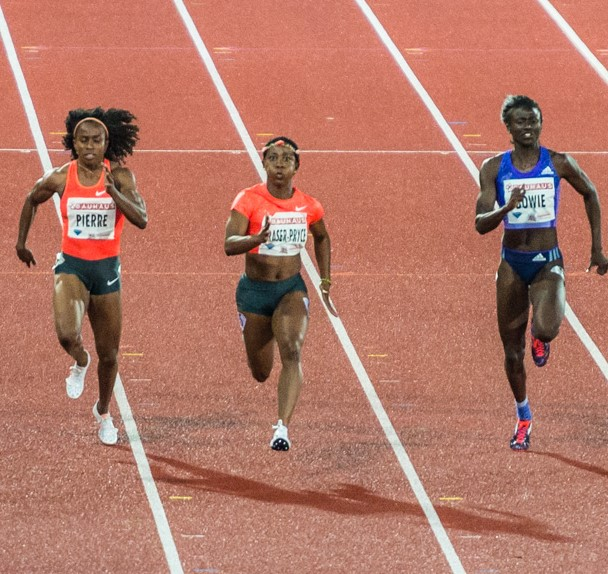
Fraser-Pryce (centre) winning the 100 m at the BAUHAUS-galan Diamond League in 2015.

Fraser-Pryce's trademark is her explosive starts, which earned her the nickname "Pocket Rocket." Her style involves "bolting to the lead" within her first few strides, then "maintaining her position through to the finish.” Jon Mulkeen of World Athletics described her starting technique as "devastating...her best weapon," while sports writer Steve Landells declared, "her ability to shift her legs over the first five metres remains the envy of the world." In a biomechanical analysis of her performance in the 2009 world 100 m final (when she ran 10.73 s), sports scientists Rolf Graubner and Eberhard Nixdorf calculated her 30 m split at 4.02 s, a level of acceleration consistent with a male 10.40 s runner. American sprinter Carmelita Jeter, who took the bronze in that race, stated, "I won't lie, I was startled by [Fraser-Pryce]. She was several steps ahead of me before I had even cleared the blocks." Despite her quick starts, Fraser-Pryce said, "I think my strength is actually when I get out of my drive phase at 30 (metres). My second 30 is actually very good, where my turnovers are very quick." In her 2019 world 100 m final (when she ran 10.71 s), Fraser-Pryce covered the first 60 m in 6.81 s, the fastest 60 m split of all time, and over one-tenth of a second faster than the 60 m world record of 6.92 s, held by Russian sprinter Irina Privalova.

At just over 5 feet (1.52 m) tall, Fraser-Pryce is shorter than most female sprinters. She recalled that when she started training at the University of Technology, "everyone [said] I was too short and I shouldn't think about running fast." A prototypical stride rate runner, she relies on cadence in her races. On average, she takes 50 strides to complete the 100 m, with a cadence of about 286 steps per minute. In their analysis, Graubner and Nixdorf found that she covered her 2009 final in 49.58 strides — equivalent to an average of two metres per stride, with her longest strides of 2.2 m exhibited over the last 20 m of her race. Her peak stride frequency occurred between the 20 and 40 m mark, averaging around 4.91 hertz (i.e. 4.91 stride cycles per second).

After switching coaches in 2020, Fraser-Pryce began to make "subtle" changes to her technique, which improved her 100 m personal best from 10.70 s to 10.60 s, and her 200 m personal best from 22.09 s to 21.79 s. Before training with Walcott, she stated that she prioritized her trademark starts and a high stride frequency, and was less concerned about her stride length and "maintaining towards the end [of her races]". However, Walcott's program built on her foundations from MVP, with additional focus on improving her endurance, increasing her stride length, and maintaining her form throughout her races. These adjustments to her mechanics helped her to become more confident in her technique and more patient in her race execution.

== Personal life ==
In November 2012, Fraser-Pryce graduated from the University of Technology with a Bachelor of Science in Child and Adolescent Development. In 2016, she announced that she would pursue a Master of Science in Applied Psychology at the University of the West Indies. A committed Christian, she married Jason Pryce in 2011, and announced her pregnancy in early 2017. On her Facebook page she wrote, "All my focus heading into training for my 2017 season was on getting healthy and putting myself in the best possible fitness to successfully defend my title in London 2017, but ... here I am thinking about being the greatest mother I can be." On 7 August 2017, she and her husband had a son named Zyon. In April 2025, she participated in a race against other parents at her son's school, winning handily.

=== Sponsorship, charities and businesses ===
Fraser-Pryce has signed sponsorship deals with Digicel, GraceKennedy and Nike. To promote her chase for Olympic glory in 2016, Nike released a series of promotional videos of her training sessions for the 100 m.

Fraser-Pryce has supported many causes throughout her career. She was named as the first UNICEF National Goodwill Ambassador for Jamaica in February 2010. That year, she was also named Grace Goodwill Ambassador for Peace in a partnership with Grace Foods and not-for-profit organisation PALS (Peace and Love in Society). She also created the Pocket Rocket Foundation, which supports high school athletes in financial need. She was named as the Laureus ambassador in April 2026.

Known for frequently changing her hairstyle during track season, she launched a hair salon named Chic Hair Ja in 2013.

== Career statistics ==
=== Personal bests ===
All information taken from World Athletics profile.

Type	Event	Time	Date	Place	Notes
Indoor	60 metres	6.98	9 March 2014	Sopot, Poland	
Outdoor	100 metres	10.60	26 August 2021	Lausanne, Switzerland	+1.7 m/s (wind); 3rd fastest of all time
Outdoor	200 metres	21.79	27 June 2021	Kingston, Jamaica	+0.8 m/s (wind)
Outdoor	400 metres	54.93	5 March 2011	Kingston, Jamaica	
Outdoor	4 × 100 metres relay	41.02	6 August 2021	Tokyo, Japan	National record; 3rd fastest of all time

=== Season's best and rankings ===
Season's best 60 m, 100 m and 200 m times, with 100 and 200 m world ranking in brackets (top 20 only) and personal bests bolded.

Year	60 metres	100 metres	200 metres
2002	–	12.38	24.85
2003	–	11.57	–
2004	–	11.72	24.08
2005	–	11.72	–
2006	–	11.74	–
2007	–	11.31	24.13
2008	–	10.78 (1)	22.15 (6)
2009	–	10.73 (2)	22.58 (18)
2010	–	–	–
2011	–	10.95 (6)	22.59 (14)
2012	–	10.70 (1)	22.09 (2)
2013	7.04	10.71 (1)	22.13 (1)
2014	**6.98**	11.01 (8)	22.53 (13)
2015	7.13	10.74 (1)	22.37 (17)
2016	–	10.86 (8)	23.15
2017	–	–	–
2018	–	10.98 (10)	–
2019	7.21	10.71 (1)	22.22 (7)
2020	7.16	10.86 (2)	22.57 (6)
2021	–	**10.60** (2)	**21.79** (4)
2022	–	10.62 (1)	21.81 (3)
2023	–	10.77 (4)	22.26 (15)
2024	–	10.91 (13)	–
2025	-	10.91 (14)	-

=== International competitions ===
Year	Competition	Venue	Position	Event	Result
2002	Central American and Caribbean; Junior Championships (U-17)	Bridgetown, Barbados	4th	200 m	25.24 (−1.0 m/s)
2002	Central American and Caribbean; Junior Championships (U-17)	Bridgetown, Barbados	1st	4 × 100 m relay	45.33 **CR**
2005	CARIFTA Games (U-20)	Bacolet, Trinidad and Tobago	3rd	100 m	11.73 (+0.9 m/s)
2005	CARIFTA Games (U-20)	Bacolet, Trinidad and Tobago	1st	4 × 100 m relay	44.53
2007	World Championships	Osaka, Japan	2nd	4 × 100 m relay	42.70 **SB**
2008	Olympic Games	Beijing, China	1st	100 m	10.78 **PB** (±0.0 m/s)
2008	Olympic Games	Beijing, China	DNF	4 × 100 m relay	Dropped baton
2008	IAAF World Athletics Final	Stuttgart, Germany	1st	100 m	10.94 (+0.3 m/s)
2009	World Championships	Berlin, Germany	1st	100 m	10.73 **WL** **NR** (+0.1 m/s)
2009	World Championships	Berlin, Germany	1st	4 × 100 m relay	42.06
2009	IAAF World Athletics Final	Thessaloniki, Greece	2nd	100 m	10.89 (-0.1 m/s)
2011	World Championships	Daegu, South Korea	4th	100 m	10.99 (−1.4 m/s)
2011	World Championships	Daegu, South Korea	2nd	4 × 100 m relay	41.70 **NR**
2012	Olympic Games	London, United Kingdom	1st	100 m	10.75 (+1.5 m/s)
2012	Olympic Games	London, United Kingdom	2nd	200 m	22.09 **PB** (−0.2 m/s)
2012	Olympic Games	London, United Kingdom	2nd	4 × 100 m relay	41.41 **NR**
2013	World Championships	Moscow, Russia	1st	100 m	10.71 **WL** (−0.3 m/s)
2013	World Championships	Moscow, Russia	1st	200 m	22.17 (−0.3 m/s)
2013	World Championships	Moscow, Russia	1st	4 × 100 m relay	41.29 **CR**
2014	World Indoor Championships	Sopot, Poland	1st	60 m	6.98 **WL** **PB**
2014	Commonwealth Games	Glasgow, United Kingdom	1st	4 × 100 m relay	41.83 **GR**
2014	World Relays	Nassau, Bahamas	3rd	4 × 200 m relay	1:30.04 **NR**
2015	World Championships	Beijing, China	1st	100 m	10.76 (−0.3 m/s)
2015	World Championships	Beijing, China	1st	4 × 100 m relay	41.07 **CR** **NR**
2016	Olympic Games	Rio de Janeiro, Brazil	3rd	100 m	10.86 **SB** (+0.5 m/s)
2016	Olympic Games	Rio de Janeiro, Brazil	2nd	4 × 100 m relay	41.36 **SB**
2018	NACAC Championships	Toronto, Canada	5th	100 m	11.18
2018	NACAC Championships	Toronto, Canada	2nd	4 × 100 m relay	43.33
2018	Athletics World Cup	London, United Kingdom	2nd	4 × 100 m relay	42.60
2019	World Relays	Yokohama, Japan	3rd	4 × 200 m relay	1:33.21
2019	Pan American Games	Lima, Peru	1st	200 m	22.43 **GR**
2019	World Championships	Doha, Qatar	1st	100 m	10.71 **WL** (+0.1 m/s)
2019	World Championships	Doha, Qatar	1st	4 × 100 m relay	41.44 **WL**
2021	Olympic Games	Tokyo, Japan	2nd	100 m	10.74
2021	Olympic Games	Tokyo, Japan	4th	200 m	21.94
2021	Olympic Games	Tokyo, Japan	1st	4 × 100 m relay	41.02 **NR**
2022	World Championships	Eugene, Oregon	1st	100 m	10.67 **WL** **CR** (+0.8 m/s)
2022	World Championships	Eugene, Oregon	2nd	200 m	21.81 **SB** (+0.6 m/s)
2022	World Championships	Eugene, Oregon	2nd	4 × 100 m relay	41.18 **SB**
2023	World Championships	Budapest, Hungary	3rd	100 m	10.77 **SB** (-0.2 m/s)
2023	World Championships	Budapest, Hungary	2nd	4 × 100 m relay	41.21
2024	Olympic Games	Paris, France	2nd (h)	100 m	10.92^{1}
2025	World Relays	Guangzhou, China	3rd	4 × 100 m relay	42.33
2025	World Championships	Tokyo, Japan	6th	100 m	11.03 (+0.3 m/s)
2025	World Championships	Tokyo, Japan	2nd	4 × 100 m relay	41.79

^{1}Did not start in the semifinals

=== Circuit wins ===
- Diamond League (100 m; other events specified in parentheses)
  - Overall winner: 2012, 2013 (100 m, 200 m), 2015, 2022
    - 2012: New York, Zürich
    - 2013: Zürich (200 m), Doha (200 m), Shanghai, Eugene, Brussels
    - 2014: Doha
    - 2015: Zürich, Stockholm, Eugene
    - 2018: London
    - 2019: London (100 m, 4 × 100 m relay), Lausanne
    - 2021: Doha, Lausanne
    - 2022: Paris, Eugene (200 m), Silesa, Monaco, Zürich
- World Indoor Tour (60 m)
  - 2020: Glasgow

=== National titles ===
- Jamaican Championships
  - 2009: 100 m
  - 2012: 100 m, 200 m
  - 2013: 200 m
  - 2015: 100 m
  - 2021: 100 m, 200 m
- Jamaican U18 Championships
  - 2002: 200 m

== See also ==
- Athletics in Jamaica
- Jamaica at the Olympics
- 100 metres at the Olympics
- 100 metres at the World Championships in Athletics
- List of multiple Olympic gold medalists
- List of Olympic medalists in athletics (women)
- List of World Athletics Championships medalists (women)
- List of 100 metres national champions (women)
- List of people from Kingston, Jamaica
- List of doping cases in athletics

== Bibliography ==
- Graubner, Rolf; Nixdorf, Eberhard (2011). "Biomechanical Analysis of the Sprint and Hurdles Events at the 2009 IAAF World Championships in Athletics" (PDF). New Studies in Athletics. 1 (2). Translated by Schiffer, Jürgen. Archived (PDF) from the original on September 17, 2020.

Awards
Preceded by Allyson Felix	IAAF World Athlete of the Year; 2013	Succeeded by Valerie Adams
Olympic Games
Preceded by Usain Bolt	Flagbearer for Jamaica; Rio de Janeiro 2016; Tokyo 2020 (with Ricardo Brown)	Succeeded by Incumbent
