= 100 metres at the World Athletics Championships =

Track event

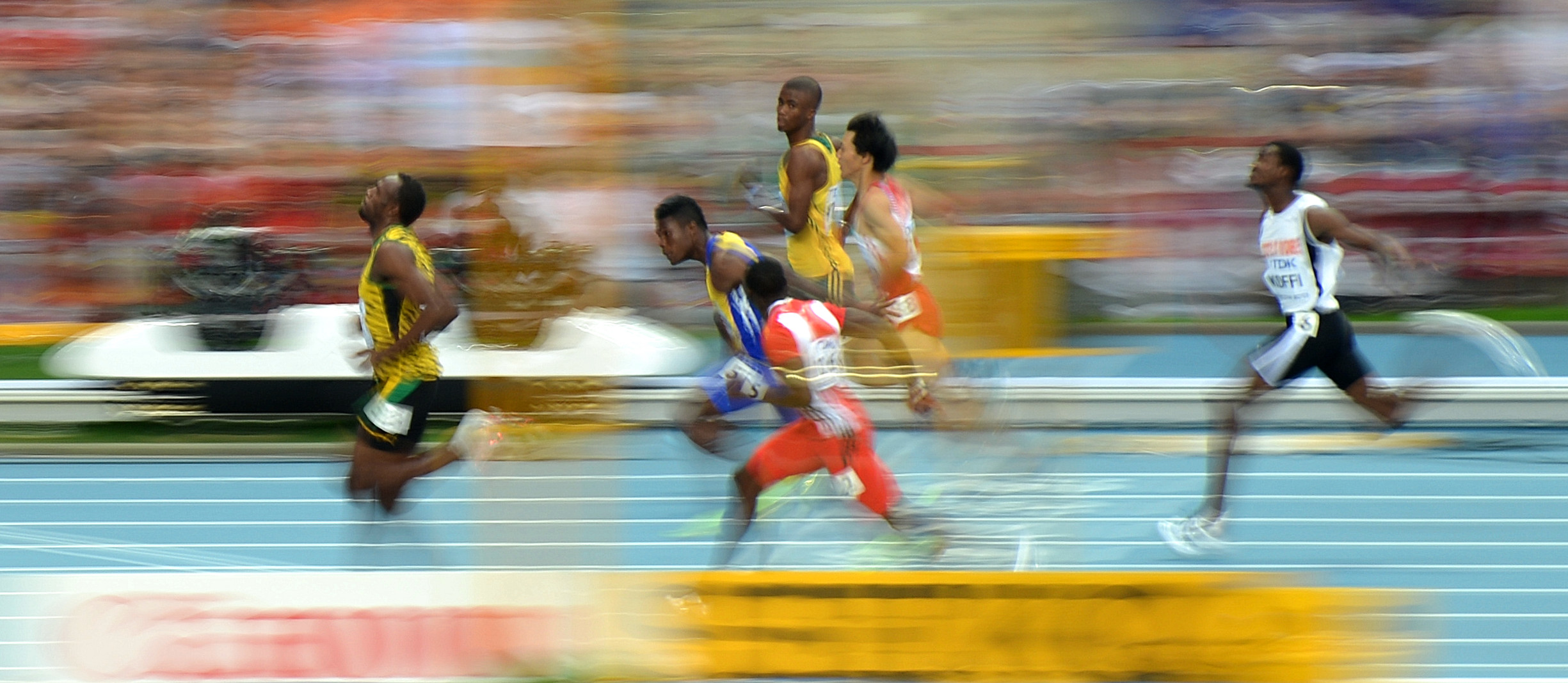
- The heats of the men's 100 m in 2013

Overview
- Gender: Men and women
- Years held: Men: 1983 – 2025; Women: 1983 – 2025

Championship record
- Men: 9.58 Usain Bolt (2009)
- Women: 10.61 Melissa Jefferson-Wooden (2025)

Reigning champion
- Men: Oblique Seville (JAM)
- Women: Melissa Jefferson-Wooden (USA)

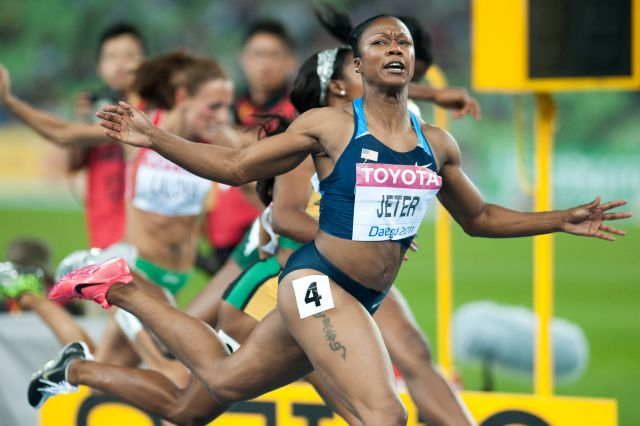
Carmelita Jeter winning the 2011 women's 100 m world title

The 100 metres at the World Championships in Athletics has been contested by both men and women since the inaugural edition in 1983. It is the second most prestigious 100 m title after the 100 metres at the Olympics. The competition format typically has two or three qualifying rounds leading to a final between eight athletes. Since 2011 a preliminary round has been held, where athletes who have not achieved the qualifying standard time compete to enter the first round proper.

The championship records for the event are 9.58 seconds for men, set by Usain Bolt in 2009, and 10.61 seconds for women, set by Melissa Jefferson-Wooden in 2025. The men's world record has been broken or equalled at the competition three times: by Carl Lewis in 1987 and 1991, and by Usain Bolt in 2009. Ben Johnson beat Lewis in the 1987 final, but his win and record were subsequently rescinded after his admission to long-term steroid use. Lewis's mark, which equalled the standing record at the time, was never officially ratified by the IAAF as a world record. The women's world record has not yet been beaten at the championships.

Shelly-Ann Fraser-Pryce is the most successful athlete of the event as the only person, male or female to win five titles, she also has the most medals with six. Carl Lewis, Maurice Greene and Usain Bolt are the most successful male athletes of the event, having each won three titles. Justin Gatlin has the most medals for a male with 5, 2 gold and 3 silver. Merlene Ottey and Carmelita Jeter are the only other athletes to have claimed four medals in the history of the World Championships event.

The United States is the most successful nation in the discipline, having won fifteen gold medals. Jamaica are a clear second with six gold medals. East Germany, with two, is the only other nation to have won multiple titles.

== Age records ==
- All information from World Athletics.

Distinction	Male			Female		
Distinction	Athlete	Age	Date	Athlete	Age	Date
Youngest champion	Yohan Blake (JAM)	21 years, 245 days	28 Aug 2011	Katrin Krabbe (GDR)	21 years, 278 days	27 Aug 1991
Youngest medalist	Darrel Brown (TTO)	18 years, 318 days	25 Aug 2003	Tina Clayton (JAM)	21 years, 27 days	13 sept 2025
Youngest finalist	Darrel Brown (TTO)	18 years, 318 days	25 Aug 2003	Nikole Mitchell (JAM)	19 years, 72 days	16 Aug 1993
Youngest participant	Darren Tuitt (MNT)	15 years, 153 days	5 Aug 1995	Tehani Kirby (MNP)	14 years, 5 days	26 Aug 1991
Oldest champion	Justin Gatlin (USA)	35 years, 176 days	5 Aug 2017	Shelly-Ann Fraser-Pryce (JAM)	35 years, 202 days	17 Aug 2022
Oldest medalist	Justin Gatlin (USA)	37 years, 230 days	28 Sep 2019	Shelly-Ann Fraser-Pryce (JAM)	36 years, 237 days	20 Aug 2023
Oldest finalist	Justin Gatlin (USA)	37 years, 230 days	28 Sep 2019	Shelly-Ann Fraser-Pryce (JAM)	38 years, 261 days	14 Sep 2025
Oldest participant	Kim Collins (SKN)	39 years, 218 days	22 Aug 2015	Merlene Ottey (SLO)	47 years, 108 days	26 Aug 2007

== Doping ==
Canada's Ben Johnson and Angella Taylor-Issajenko were both disqualified from the 1987 World Championships in Athletics for doping. Johnson was stripped of his 100 m gold, elevating Carl Lewis to world champion, while Taylor-Issajenko finished fifth in the women's 100 m final.

At the following edition in 1991, Irina Slyusar of the Soviet Union (a women's semi-finalist) was disqualified for doping. Eight years passed without incident in the 100 m before the double Nigerian doping disqualification of Innocent Asonze and Davidson Ezinwa in 1999.

Tim Montgomery became the 100 m second medalist to be disqualified, losing his silver medal from the 2001 World Championships in Athletics. From the same event, Marion Jones later lost her silver medal for doping infractions, becoming the first female medalist to be stripped of a 100 m medal. Venolyn Clarke and Kelli White (a women's finalist) were also disqualified that year. The results of Dwain Chambers and Montgomery, fourth and fifth in 2003, were removed for doping. Two women's medalists were stripped of their honours for doping Kelli White lost the world title while Zhanna Block had her bronze medal removed. Block's times from the 2005 edition were also annulled. These disqualifications were a result of the BALCO scandal, which included many 100 m runners.

No doping offences were recorded at the 2007 World Championships 100 metres, but bans shortly returned, with Ruqaya Al-Ghasra being banned from the 2009 edition and a female trio of Inna Eftimova, Semoy Hackett and Norjannah Hafiszah Jamaludin being disqualified in 2011. The 2013 World Championships saw one elimination in Masoud Azizi.

Among the men's world champions, only Donovan Bailey, Usain Bolt, Noah Lyles and Oblique Seville have not been implicated in doping during their careers; three-time champion Maurice Greene never failed a drug test, but admitted purchasing drugs on other athletes behalf.

== Medalists ==
=== Men ===
Championships	Gold	Silver	Bronze
1983 Helsinki	Carl Lewis (USA)	Calvin Smith (USA)	Emmit King (USA)
1987 Rome	Carl Lewis (USA)	Raymond Stewart (JAM)	Linford Christie (GBR)
1991 Tokyo	Carl Lewis (USA)	Leroy Burrell (USA)	Dennis Mitchell (USA)
1993 Stuttgart	Linford Christie (GBR)	Andre Cason (USA)	Dennis Mitchell (USA)
1995 Gothenburg	Donovan Bailey (CAN)	Bruny Surin (CAN)	Ato Boldon (TRI)
1997 Athens	Maurice Greene (USA)	Donovan Bailey (CAN)	Tim Montgomery (USA)
1999 Seville	Maurice Greene (USA)	Bruny Surin (CAN)	Dwain Chambers (GBR)
2001 Edmonton	Maurice Greene (USA)	Bernard Williams (USA)	Ato Boldon (TRI)
2003 Saint-Denis	Kim Collins (SKN)	Darrel Brown (TRI)	Darren Campbell (GBR)
2005 Helsinki	Justin Gatlin (USA)	Michael Frater (JAM)	Kim Collins (SKN)
2007 Osaka	Tyson Gay (USA)	Derrick Atkins (BAH)	Asafa Powell (JAM)
2009 Berlin	Usain Bolt (JAM)	Tyson Gay (USA)	Asafa Powell (JAM)
2011 Daegu	Yohan Blake (JAM)	Walter Dix (USA)	Kim Collins (SKN)
2013 Moscow	Usain Bolt (JAM)	Justin Gatlin (USA)	Nesta Carter (JAM)
2015 Beijing	Usain Bolt (JAM)	Justin Gatlin (USA)	Trayvon Bromell (USA) Andre De Grasse (CAN)
2017 London	Justin Gatlin (USA)	Christian Coleman (USA)	Usain Bolt (JAM)
2019 Doha	Christian Coleman (USA)	Justin Gatlin (USA)	Andre De Grasse (CAN)
2022 Eugene	Fred Kerley (USA)	Marvin Bracy (USA)	Trayvon Bromell (USA)
2023 Budapest	Noah Lyles (USA)	Letsile Tebogo (BOT)	Zharnel Hughes (GBR)
2025 Tokyo	Oblique Seville (JAM)	Kishane Thompson (JAM)	Noah Lyles (USA)

==== Medalists by country ====
Rank	Nation	Gold	Silver	Bronze	Total
1	United States (USA)	12	11	7	30
2	Jamaica (JAM)	5	3	4	12
3	Canada (CAN)	1	3	2	6
4	Great Britain (GBR)	1	0	4	5
5	Saint Kitts and Nevis (SKN)	1	0	2	3
6	Trinidad and Tobago (TRI)	0	1	2	3
7	Bahamas (BAH)	0	1	0	1
7	Botswana (BOT)	0	1	0	1

==== Multiple medalists ====
Rank	Athlete	Nation	Championships	Gold	Silver	Bronze	Total
1	Usain Bolt	Jamaica (JAM)	2009–2017	3	0	1	4
2	Carl Lewis	United States (USA)	1983–1991	3	0	0	3
2	Maurice Greene	United States (USA)	1997–2001	3	0	0	3
4	Justin Gatlin	United States (USA)	2005–2019	2	3	0	5
5	Christian Coleman	United States (USA)	2017–2019	1	1	0	2
5	Donovan Bailey	Canada (CAN)	1995–1997	1	1	0	2
5	Tyson Gay	United States (USA)	2007–2009	1	1	0	2
8	Kim Collins	Saint Kitts and Nevis (SKN)	2003–2011	1	0	2	3
9	Linford Christie	Great Britain (GBR)	1987–1993	1	0	1	2
9	Noah Lyles	United States (USA)	2023–2025	1	0	1	2
11	Bruny Surin	Canada (CAN)	1995–1999	0	2	0	2
12	Dennis Mitchell	United States (USA)	1991–1993	0	0	2	2
12	Ato Boldon	Trinidad and Tobago (TRI)	1995–2001	0	0	2	2
12	Asafa Powell	Jamaica (JAM)	2007–2009	0	0	2	2
12	Andre De Grasse	Canada (CAN)	2015–2019	0	0	2	2
12	Trayvon Bromell	United States (USA)	2015-2022	0	0	2	2

=== Women ===
Championships	Gold	Silver	Bronze
1983 Helsinki	Marlies Oelsner-Göhr (GDR)	Marita Koch (GDR)	Diane Williams (USA)
1987 Rome	Silke Gladisch-Möller (GDR)	Heike Daute-Drechsler (GDR)	Merlene Ottey (JAM)
1991 Tokyo	Katrin Krabbe (GER)	Gwen Torrence (USA)	Merlene Ottey (JAM)
1993 Stuttgart	Gail Devers (USA)	Merlene Ottey (JAM)	Gwen Torrence (USA)
1995 Gothenburg	Gwen Torrence (USA)	Merlene Ottey (JAM)	Irina Privalova (RUS)
1997 Athens	Marion Jones (USA)	Zhanna Pintusevich (UKR)	Savatheda Fynes (BAH)
1999 Seville	Marion Jones (USA)	Inger Miller (USA)	Ekaterini Thanou (GRE)
2001 Edmonton	Zhanna Pintusevich-Block (UKR)	Ekaterini Thanou (GRE)	Chandra Sturrup (BAH)
2003 Saint-Denis	Torri Edwards (USA)	Chandra Sturrup (BAH)	Ekaterini Thanou (GRE)
2005 Helsinki	Lauryn Williams (USA)	Veronica Campbell (JAM)	Christine Arron (FRA)
2007 Osaka	Veronica Campbell-Brown (JAM)	Lauryn Williams (USA)	Carmelita Jeter (USA)
2009 Berlin	Shelly-Ann Fraser (JAM)	Kerron Stewart (JAM)	Carmelita Jeter (USA)
2011 Daegu	Carmelita Jeter (USA)	Veronica Campbell-Brown (JAM)	Kelly-Ann Baptiste (TRI)
2013 Moscow	Shelly-Ann Fraser-Pryce (JAM)	Murielle Ahouré (CIV)	Carmelita Jeter (USA)
2015 Beijing	Shelly-Ann Fraser-Pryce (JAM)	Dafne Schippers (NED)	Tori Bowie (USA)
2017 London	Tori Bowie (USA)	Marie Josée Ta Lou (CIV)	Dafne Schippers (NED)
2019 Doha	Shelly-Ann Fraser-Pryce (JAM)	Dina Asher-Smith (GBR)	Marie Josée Ta Lou (CIV)
2022 Eugene	Shelly-Ann Fraser-Pryce (JAM)	Shericka Jackson (JAM)	Elaine Thompson-Herah (JAM)
2023 Budapest	Sha'Carri Richardson (USA)	Shericka Jackson (JAM)	Shelly-Ann Fraser-Pryce (JAM)
2025 Tokyo	Melissa Jefferson-Wooden (USA)	Tina Clayton (JAM)	Julien Alfred (LCA)

==== Medalists by country ====
Rank	Nation	Gold	Silver	Bronze	Total
1	United States (USA)	10	3	6	19
2	Jamaica (JAM)	6	8	4	18
3	East Germany (GDR)	2	2	0	4
4	Ukraine (UKR)	1	1	0	2
5	Germany (GER)	1	0	0	1
6	Ivory Coast (CIV)	0	2	1	3
7	Bahamas (BAH)	0	1	2	3
7	Greece (GRE)	0	1	2	3
9	Netherlands (NED)	0	1	1	2
10	Great Britain (GBR)	0	1	0	1
11	France (FRA)	0	0	1	1
11	Russia (RUS)	0	0	1	1
11	Saint Lucia (LCA)	0	0	1	1
11	Trinidad and Tobago (TRI)	0	0	1	1

==== Multiple medalists ====
Rank	Athlete	Nation	Championships	Gold	Silver	Bronze	Total
1	Shelly-Ann Fraser-Pryce	Jamaica (JAM)	2009–2023	5	0	1	6
2	Marion Jones	United States (USA)	1997–1999	2	0	0	2
3	Veronica Campbell-Brown	Jamaica (JAM)	2005–2011	1	2	0	3
4	Gwen Torrence	United States (USA)	1991–1995	1	1	1	3
5	Zhanna Block	Ukraine (UKR)	1997–2001	1	1	0	2
5	Lauryn Williams	United States (USA)	2005–2007	1	1	0	2
7	Carmelita Jeter	United States (USA)	2007–2013	1	0	3	4
8	Tori Bowie	United States (USA)	2015–2017	1	0	1	2
9	Merlene Ottey	Jamaica (JAM)	1987–1995	0	2	2	4
10	Shericka Jackson	Jamaica (JAM)	2022–2023	0	2	0	2
11	Ekaterini Thanou	Greece (GRE)	1999–2003	0	1	2	3
12	Chandra Sturrup	Bahamas (BAH)	2001–2003	0	1	1	2
12	Dafne Schippers	Netherlands (NED)	2015–2017	0	1	1	2
12	Marie Josée Ta Lou	Ivory Coast (CIV)	2017–2019	0	1	1	2

== Championship record progression ==
=== Men ===
Men's 100 metres World Championships record progression
Time	Athlete	Nation	Year	Round	Date
10.64	Luke Watson	Great Britain (GBR)	1983	Heats	1983-08-07
10.38	Juan Núñez	Dominican Republic (DOM)	1983	Heats	1983-08-07
10.34	Carl Lewis	United States (USA)	1983	Heats	1983-08-07
10.31	Desai Williams	Canada (CAN)	1983	Heats	1983-08-07
10.30	Calvin Smith	United States (USA)	1983	Heats	1983-08-07
10.24	Leandro Peñalver	Cuba (CUB)	1983	Heats	1983-08-07
10.20	Carl Lewis	United States (USA)	1983	Quarter-finals	1983-08-07
10.07	Carl Lewis	United States (USA)	1983	Final	1983-08-08
10.03	Carl Lewis	United States (USA)	1987	Semi-finals	1987-08-30
~~9.83 WR~~^{[dq1]}	Ben Johnson	Canada (CAN)	1987	Final	1987-08-30
9.93 WR=	Carl Lewis	United States (USA)	1987	Final	1987-08-30
9.93	Carl Lewis	United States (USA)	1991	Semi-finals	1991-08-25
9.86 WR	Carl Lewis	United States (USA)	1991	Final	1991-08-25
9.86	Maurice Greene	United States (USA)	1997	Final	1997-08-03
9.80	Maurice Greene	United States (USA)	1999	Final	1999-08-22
9.58 WR	Usain Bolt	Jamaica (JAM)	2009	Final	2009-08-16

- ^{dq1} Ben Johnson's winning time of 9.83 broke the championship record and was a new world record, but it was retrospectively annulled due to doping.

=== Women ===
Women's 100 metres World Championships record progression
Time	Athlete	Nation	Year	Round	Date
11.26	Olga Antonova	Soviet Union (URS)	1983	Heats	1983-08-07
11.24	Marita Koch	East Germany (GDR)	1983	Heats	1983-08-07
11.23	Diane Williams	United States (USA)	1983	Heats	1983-08-07
11.15	Evelyn Ashford	United States (USA)	1983	Heats	1983-08-07
11.11	Evelyn Ashford	United States (USA)	1983	Quarter-finals	1983-08-07
11.05	Marlies Göhr	East Germany (GDR)	1983	Semi-finals	1983-08-08
10.99	Evelyn Ashford	United States (USA)	1983	Semi-finals	1983-08-08
10.97	Marlies Göhr	East Germany (GDR)	1983	Final	1983-08-08
10.95	Heike Drechsler	East Germany (GDR)	1987	Semi-finals	1987-08-30
10.90	Silke Möller	East Germany (GDR)	1987	Semi-finals	1987-08-30
10.87	Merlene Ottey	Jamaica (JAM)	1993	Semi-finals	1993-08-16
10.87	Gwen Torrence	United States (USA)	1993	Semi-finals	1993-08-16
10.82	Gail Devers	United States (USA)	1993	Final	1993-08-16
10.82	Merlene Ottey	Jamaica (JAM)	1993	Final	1993-08-16
10.76	Marion Jones	United States (USA)	1999	Quarter-finals	1999-08-21
10.70	Marion Jones	United States (USA)	1999	Final	1999-08-22
10.67	Shelly-Ann Fraser-Pryce	Jamaica (JAM)	2022	Final	2022-07-17
10.65	Sha'Carri Richardson	United States (USA)	2023	Final	2023-08-21
10.61	Melissa Jefferson-Wooden	United States (USA)	2025	Final	2025-09-14

== Finishing times ==
=== Top ten fastest World Championship times ===
Fastest men's times at the World Championships
Rank	Time (sec)	Athlete	Nation	Games	Date
1	9.58	Usain Bolt	Jamaica	2009	2009-08-16
2	9.71	Tyson Gay	United States	2009	2009-08-16
3	9.76	Christian Coleman	United States	2019	2019-09-28
4	9.77	Usain Bolt	Jamaica	2013	2013-08-11
4	9.77	Justin Gatlin	United States	2015^{SF}	2015-08-23
4	9.77	Oblique Seville	Jamaica	2025	2025-09-14
7	9.79	Usain Bolt	Jamaica	2015	2015-08-23
7	9.79	Fred Kerley	United States	2022^{H}	2022-07-15
9	9.80	Maurice Greene	United States	1999	1999-08-22
9	9.80	Justin Gatlin	United States	2015	2015-08-23

Fastest women's times at the World Championships
Rank	Time (sec)	Athlete	Nation	Games	Date
1	10.61	Melissa Jefferson-Wooden	United States	2025	2025-09-14
2	10.65	Sha'Carri Richardson	United States	2023	2023-08-21
3	10.67	Shelly-Ann Fraser-Pryce	Jamaica	2022	2022-07-17
4	10.70	Marion Jones	United States	1999	1999-08-22
5	10.71	Shelly-Ann Fraser-Pryce	Jamaica	2013	2013-08-12
5	10.71	Shelly-Ann Fraser-Pryce	Jamaica	2019	2019-09-29
7	10.72	Shericka Jackson	Jamaica	2023	2023-08-21
8	10.73	Shelly-Ann Fraser	Jamaica	2009	2009-08-17
8	10.73	Shericka Jackson	Jamaica	2022	2022-07-17
8	10.73	Melissa Jefferson-Wooden	United States	2025^{SF}	2025-09-14

- ^{H} – time recorded in the heats
- ^{QF} – time recorded in the quarter-finals
- ^{SF} – time recorded in the semi-finals

=== Best time for place ===
Fastest Men's times for place in a World Championship final
Place	Time	Athlete	Nation	Games	Date
1	9.58	Usain Bolt	Jamaica	2009	2009-08-16
2	9.71	Tyson Gay	United States	2009	2009-08-16
3	9.84	Asafa Powell	Jamaica	2009	2009-08-16
4	9.88	Oblique Seville	Jamaica	2023	2023-08-20
5	9.92	Christian Coleman	United States	2023	2023-08-20
6	9.96	Raymond Stewart	Jamaica	1991	1991-08-25
7=	10.00	Marc Burns	Trinidad and Tobago	2009	2009-08-16
7=	10.00	Asafa Powell	Jamaica	2015	2015-08-23
8	10.00	Jimmy Vicaut	France	2015	2015-08-23
9	10.06	Su Bingtian	China	2015	2015-08-23

Fastest women's times for place in a World Championship final
Place	Time	Athlete	Nation	Games	Date
1	10.61	Melissa Jefferson-Wooden	United States	2025	2025-09-14
2	10.72	Shericka Jackson	Jamaica	2023	2023-08-21
3	10.77	Shelly-Ann Fraser-Pryce	Jamaica	2023	2023-08-21
4	10.81	Marie-Josee Ta Lou	Ivory Coast	2023	2023-08-21
5	10.91	Mujinga Kambundji	Switzerland	2022	2022-07-17
6	10.92	Aleia Hobbs	United States	2022	2022-07-17
7	10.93	Marie Josée Ta Lou	Ivory Coast	2022	2022-07-17
8	11.00	Dina Asher-Smith	(United Kingdom) Great Britain & N.I.	2023	2023-08-21
9	11.03	Tamari Davis	United States	2023	2023-08-21

== Bibliography ==
- Butler, Mark (2013). IAAF Statistics Book Moscow 2013 (PDF). IAAF. Archived from the original (PDF) on 12 October 2014.
