= Laureus World Sports Award for Sportswoman of the Year =

Annual award

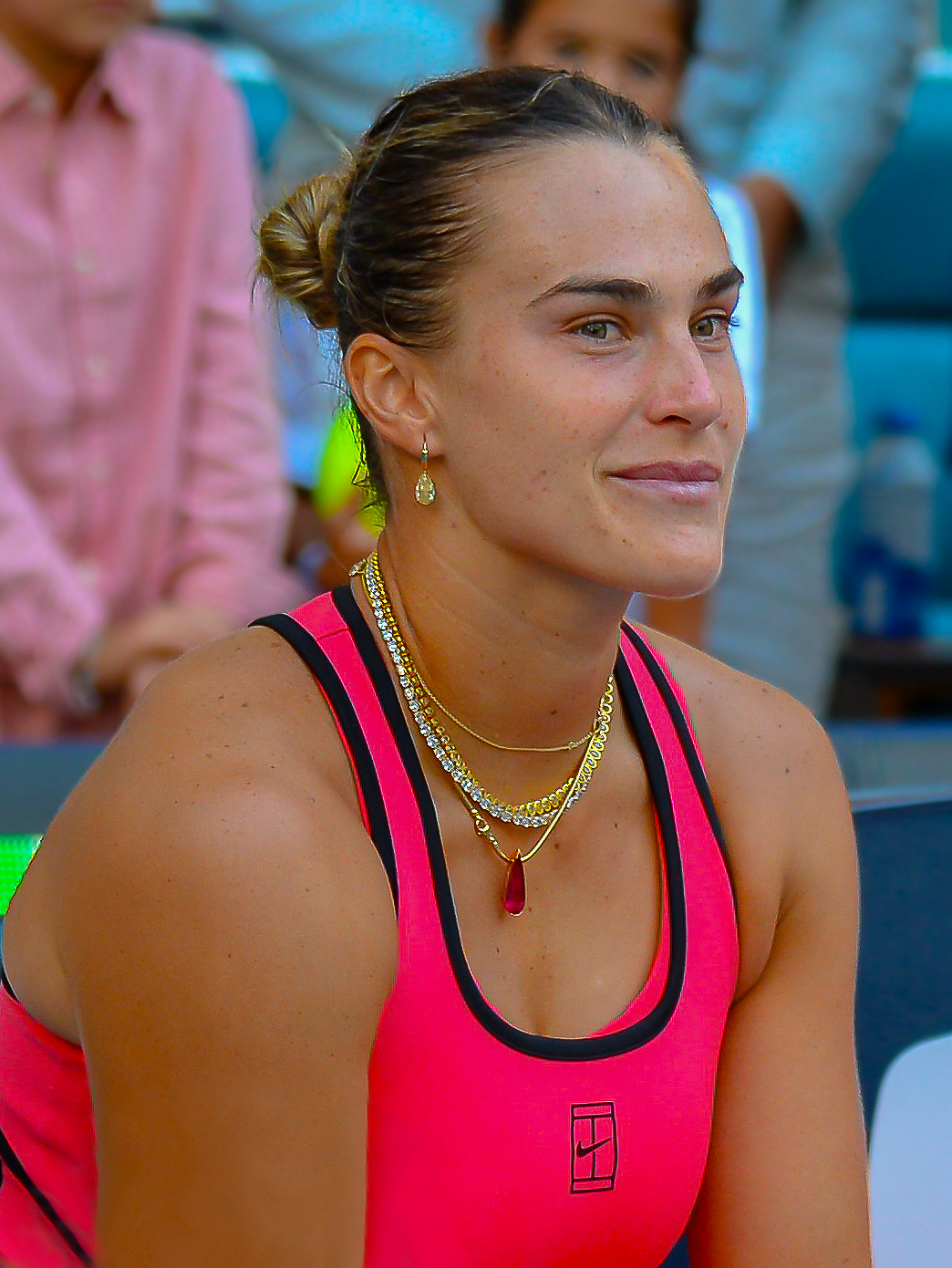
- Aryna Sabalenka, 2026 winner
- Awarded for: "the most remarkable women from the world of sport along with the greatest achievements fans have admired throughout the year."
- Location: Madrid (2026)
- Presented by: Laureus Sport for Good Foundation
- First award: 2000
- Currently held by: (Belarus) Aryna Sabalenka (1st award)

Highlights
- Most awards: (United States) Serena Williams; (United States) Simone Biles; (4 awards each)
- Most nominations: (United States) Katie Ledecky (6 nominations)
- Website: Official website

The Laureus World Sports Award for Sportswoman of the Year is an annual award honouring the achievements of individual women from the world of sports. It was first awarded in 2000 as one of the seven constituent awards presented during the Laureus World Sports Awards. The awards are presented by the Laureus Sport for Good Foundation, a global organisation involved in more than 150 charity projects supporting 500,000 young people. The first ceremony was held on 25 May 2000 in Monte Carlo, at which Nelson Mandela gave the keynote speech. As of 2020, a shortlist of six nominees for the award comes from a panel composed of the "world's leading sports editors, writers and broadcasters". The Laureus World Sports Academy then selects the winner who is presented with a Laureus statuette, created by Cartier, at an annual awards ceremony held in various locations around the world. The awards are considered highly prestigious and are frequently referred to as the sporting equivalent of "Oscars".

The inaugural winner of the award was American sprinter Marion Jones, who, at the time of the presentation, was considered to be "the world's dominant sprinter". She later admitted to having taken performance-enhancing drugs and, along with being stripped of her Olympic medals by the International Olympic Committee in 2007, her Laureus Award and nominations (2001 and 2003) were rescinded. American sportswomen have won more awards and nominations than any other nationality, with eleven wins and thirty-eight nominations. American tennis player Serena Williams and American artistic gymnast Simone Biles hold the record for the most awards with four. The 2026 award was won by the Belarusian tennis player Aryna Sabalenka.

== List of winners and nominees ==
Key
*	Indicates individual whose award or nomination was later rescinded

Laureus World Sports Award for Sportswoman of the Year winners and nominees
Year	Image	Winner	Nationality	Sport	Nominees	Ref(s)
2000	Marion Jones	Marion Jones*	USA	Athletics	Lindsay Davenport (USA) – tennis Gabriela Szabo (ROM) – athletics	
2001	Cathy Freeman	Cathy Freeman	AUS	Athletics	Inge de Bruijn (NED) – swimming Marion Jones* (USA) – athletics Karrie Webb (AUS) – golf Venus Williams (USA) – tennis	
2002	Jennifer Capriati	Jennifer Capriati	USA	Tennis	Inge de Bruijn (NED) – swimming Stacy Dragila (USA) – athletics Annika Sörenstam (SWE) – golf Venus Williams (USA) – tennis	
2003	Serena Williams	Serena Williams	USA	Tennis	Marion Jones* (USA) – athletics Janica Kostelić (CRO) – alpine skiing Paula Radcliffe (GBR) – athletics Annika Sörenstam (SWE) – golf	
2004	Annika Sorenstam	Annika Sörenstam	SWE	Golf	Inge de Bruijn (NED) – swimming Justine Henin-Hardenne (BEL) – tennis Maria de Lurdes Mutola (MOZ) – athletics Paula Radcliffe (GBR) – athletics Serena Williams (USA) – tennis	
2005	Kelly Holmes	Kelly Holmes	GBR	Athletics	Yelena Isinbayeva (RUS) – athletics Carolina Klüft (SWE) – athletics Maria Sharapova (RUS) – tennis Annika Sörenstam (SWE) – golf Leontien Zijlaard-Van Moorsel (NED) – cycling	
2006		Janica Kostelić	CRO	Alpine skiing	Kim Clijsters (BEL) – tennis Tirunesh Dibaba (ETH) – athletics Yelena Isinbayeva (RUS) – athletics Carolina Klüft (SWE) – athletics Paula Radcliffe (GBR) – athletics Annika Sörenstam (SWE) – golf	
2007	Yelena Isinbayeva	Yelena Isinbayeva	RUS	Athletics	Justine Henin (BEL) – tennis Carolina Klüft (SWE) – athletics Laure Manaudou (FRA) – swimming Amélie Mauresmo (FRA) – tennis Maria Sharapova (RUS) – tennis	
2008	Justin Henin	Justine Henin	BEL	Tennis	Yelena Isinbayeva (RUS) – athletics Carolina Klüft (SWE) – athletics Libby Lenton (AUS) – swimming Marta (BRA) – football Lorena Ochoa (MEX) – golf	
2009	Yelena Isinbayeva	Yelena Isinbayeva	RUS	Athletics	Tirunesh Dibaba (ETH) – athletics Lorena Ochoa (MEX) – golf Stephanie Rice (AUS)– swimming Lindsey Vonn (USA) – alpine skiing Venus Williams (USA) – tennis	
2010	Serena Williams	Serena Williams	USA	Tennis	Shelly-Ann Fraser (JAM) – athletics Federica Pellegrini (ITA) – swimming Sanya Richards (USA) – athletics Britta Steffen (GER) – swimming Lindsey Vonn (USA) – alpine skiing	
2011	Lindsey Vonn	Lindsey Vonn	USA	Alpine skiing	Kim Clijsters (BEL) – tennis Jessica Ennis (GBR) – athletics Blanka Vlašić (CRO) – athletics Serena Williams (USA) – tennis Caroline Wozniacki (DEN) – tennis	
2012	Vivian Cheruiyot	Vivian Cheruiyot	KEN	Athletics	Carmelita Jeter (USA) – athletics Maria Höfl-Riesch (GER) – alpine skiing Homare Sawa (JPN) – football Petra Kvitová (CZE) – tennis Yani Tseng (TPE) – golf	
2013	Jessica Ennis	Jessica Ennis	GBR	Athletics	Allyson Felix (USA) – athletics Lindsey Vonn (USA) – alpine skiing Missy Franklin (USA) – swimming Serena Williams (USA) – tennis Shelly-Ann Fraser-Pryce (JAM) – athletics	
2014	Missy Franklin	Missy Franklin	USA	Swimming	Serena Williams (USA) – tennis Shelly-Ann Fraser-Pryce (JAM) – athletics Yelena Isinbayeva (RUS) – athletics Tina Maze (SLO) – alpine skiing Nadine Angerer (GER) – football	
2015	Genzebe Dibaba	Genzebe Dibaba	ETH	Athletics	Valerie Adams (NZL) – athletics Li Na (CHN) – tennis Tina Maze (SLO) – alpine skiing Serena Williams (USA) – tennis Marit Bjørgen (NOR) – Nordic skiing	
2016	Serena Williams	Serena Williams	USA	Tennis	Genzebe Dibaba (ETH) – athletics Anna Fenninger (AUT) – alpine skiing Shelly-Ann Fraser-Pryce (JAM) – athletics Katie Ledecky (USA) – swimming Carli Lloyd (USA) – football	
2017	Simone Biles	Simone Biles	USA	Gymnastics	Allyson Felix (USA) – athletics Laura Kenny (GBR) – cycling Angelique Kerber (GER) – tennis Katie Ledecky (USA) – swimming Elaine Thompson (JAM) – athletics	
2018	Serena Williams	Serena Williams	USA	Tennis	Allyson Felix (USA) – athletics Katie Ledecky (USA) – swimming Garbiñe Muguruza (ESP) – tennis Caster Semenya (RSA) – athletics Mikaela Shiffrin (USA) – alpine skiing	
2019	Simone Biles	Simone Biles	USA	Gymnastics	Simona Halep (ROU) – tennis Angelique Kerber (GER) – tennis Ester Ledecká (CZE) – snowboarding Daniela Ryf (SUI) – triathlon Mikaela Shiffrin (USA) – skiing	
2020	Simone Biles	Simone Biles	USA	Gymnastics	Allyson Felix (USA) – athletics Megan Rapinoe (USA) – football Mikaela Shiffrin (USA) – alpine skiing Naomi Osaka (JPN) – tennis Shelly-Ann Fraser-Pryce (JAM) – athletics	
2021	Naomi Osaka	Naomi Osaka	JPN	Tennis	Anna van der Breggen (NED) – cycling Federica Brignone (ITA) – alpine skiing Brigid Kosgei (KEN) – athletics Wendie Renard (FRA) – football Breanna Stewart (USA) – basketball	
2022	Elaine Thompson-Herah	Elaine Thompson-Herah	JAM	Athletics	Ashleigh Barty (AUS) – tennis Allyson Felix (USA) – athletics Katie Ledecky (USA) – swimming Emma McKeon (AUS) – swimming Alexia Putellas (ESP) – football	
2023	Shelly-Ann Fraser-Pryce	Shelly-Ann Fraser-Pryce	JAM	Athletics	Katie Ledecky (USA) – swimming Sydney McLaughlin-Levrone (USA) – athletics Alexia Putellas (ESP) – football Mikaela Shiffrin (USA) – alpine skiing Iga Świątek (POL) – tennis	
2024	Aitana Bonmatí	Aitana Bonmatí	ESP	Football	Shericka Jackson (JAM) – athletics Faith Kipyegon (KEN) – athletics Sha'Carri Richardson (USA) – athletics Mikaela Shiffrin (USA) – skiing Iga Świątek (POL) – tennis	
2025	Simone Biles	Simone Biles	USA	Gymnastics	Aitana Bonmatí (ESP) – football Sifan Hassan (NED) – athletics Faith Kipyegon (KEN) – athletics Sydney McLaughlin-Levrone (USA) – athletics Aryna Sabalenka (BLR) – tennis	
2026	Aryna Sabalenka	Aryna Sabalenka	BLR	Tennis	Aitana Bonmatí (ESP) – Football; Melissa Jefferson-Wooden (USA) – Athletics; Faith Kipyegon (KEN) – athletics Katie Ledecky (USA) – swimming Sydney McLaughlin-Levrone (USA) – Athletics	

== Statistics ==
Statistics are correct as of 2026 nominations.

Multiple winners and nominees
Name	Wins	Nominations
Serena Williams	4	5
Simone Biles	4	4
Yelena Isinbayeva	2	4
Shelly-Ann Fraser-Pryce	1	5
Annika Sörenstam	1	4
Lindsey Vonn	1	3
Aitana Bonmatí	1	2
Justine Henin	1	2
Aryna Sabalenka	1	2
Janica Kostelić	1	1
Jessica Ennis	1	1
Genzebe Dibaba	1	1
Naomi Osaka	1	1
Missy Franklin	1	1
Elaine Thompson-Herah	1	1
Cathy Freeman	1	0
Jennifer Capriati	1	0
Kelly Holmes	1	0
Vivian Cheruiyot	1	0
Katie Ledecky	0	6
Allyson Felix	0	5
Mikaela Shiffrin	0	5
Carolina Klüft	0	4
Venus Williams	0	3
Inge de Bruijn	0	3
Faith Kipyegon	0	3
Sydney McLaughlin-Levrone	0	3
Paula Radcliffe	0	3
Maria Sharapova	0	2
Kim Clijsters	0	2
Tirunesh Dibaba	0	2
Lorena Ochoa	0	2
Tina Maze	0	2
Angelique Kerber	0	2
Alexia Putellas	0	2
Iga Swiatek	0	2

Winners by nationality
Country	Winners	Nominations
USA	11	41
JAM	2	7
RUS	2	6
GBR	2	5
SWE	1	8
AUS	1	5
ESP	1	5
BEL	1	4
KEN	1	4
ETH	1	3
BLR	1	2
CRO	1	2
JPN	1	2
NED	0	6
GER	0	5
KEN	0	3
CZE	0	2
ITA	0	2
MEX	0	2
POL	0	2
ROU	0	2
SLO	0	2
AUT	0	1
BRA	0	1
CHN	0	1
DEN	0	1
FRA	0	1
MOZ	0	1
NZL	0	1
RSA	0	1
SUI	0	1
TPE	0	1

Winners by sport
Sport	Winners	Nominations
Athletics	9	52
Tennis	8	29
Gymnastics	4	4
Alpine skiing	2	15
Swimming	1	17
Football	1	10
Golf	1	8
Cycling	0	3
Basketball	0	1
Nordic skiing	0	1
Snowboarding	0	1
Triathlon	0	1

== See also ==
- List of sports awards honoring women
- Laureus World Sports Award for Sportsman of the Year
- Athlete of the Year
