= 1981 AIAW Division I Outdoor Track and Field Championships =

U.S. women's athletics collegiate championship event

- Dates: May 28–30, 1981
- Host city: Austin, Texas; University of Texas at Austin
- Venue: Darrell K Royal–Texas Memorial Stadium
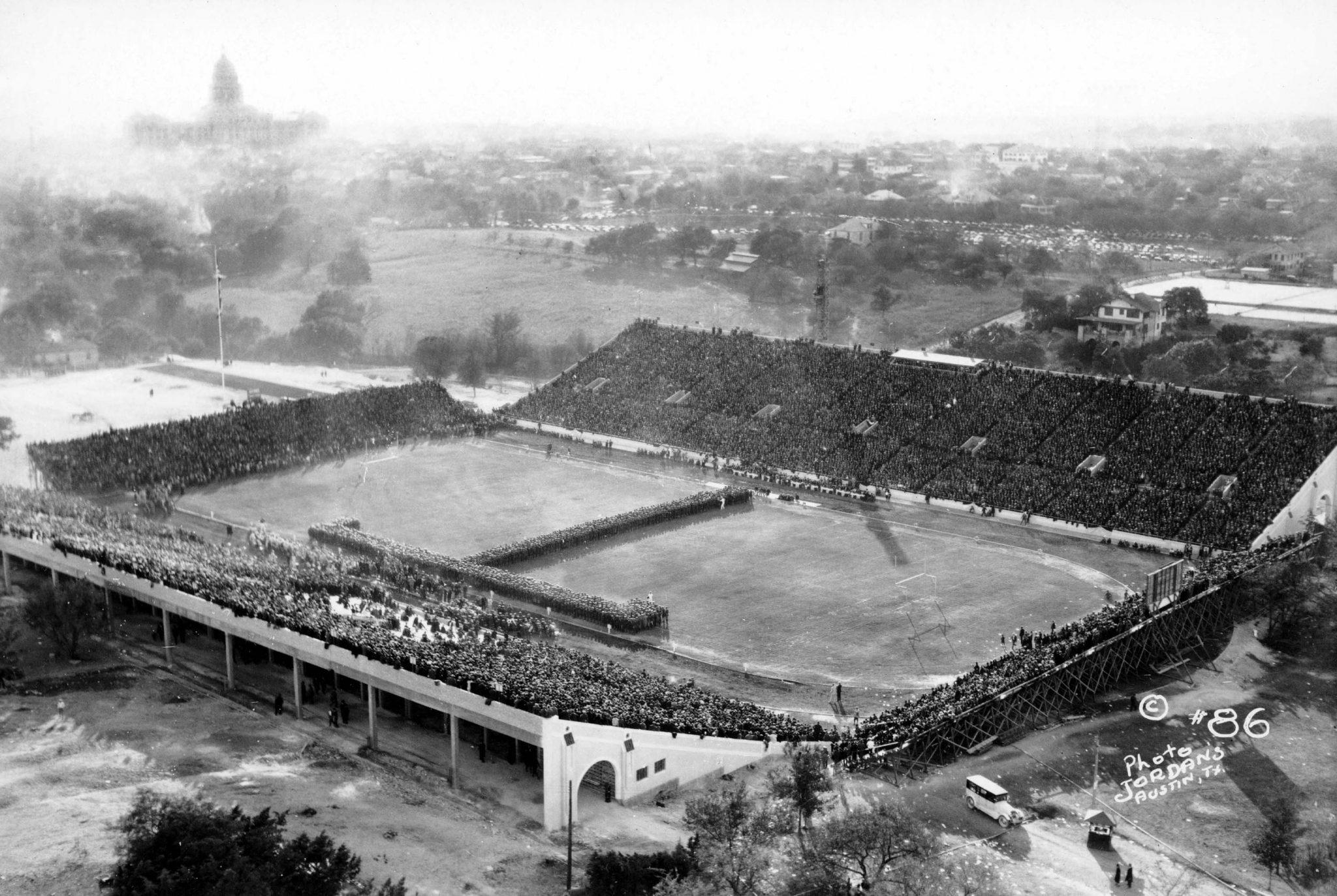

The 1981 AIAW Division I Outdoor Track And Field Championships were the 13th annual Association for Intercollegiate Athletics for Women-sanctioned track meet to determine the individual and team national champions of women's collegiate outdoor track and field events in the United States. They were contested May 28−30, 1981 in Austin, Texas by host University of Texas at Austin.

The University of Tennessee upset the University of California at Los Angeles to win the team title. They were said to have been helped by some top rivals not competing or getting injured at the meet. Benita Fitzgerald helped score 24 points for the Volunteers after winning the 100 m hurdles and sprint medley relay.

== Team standings ==
- Scoring: 10 points for a 1st-place finish, 8 points for 2nd, 6 points for 3rd, 4 points for 4th, 2 points for 5th, and 1 point for 6th. Top 10 teams shown.

Rank	Team	Points
1st place, gold medalist(s)	Tennessee Volunteers	61
2nd place, silver medalist(s)	UCLA Bruins	57
3rd place, bronze medalist(s)	Florida State Seminoles	40
3rd place, bronze medalist(s)	Oregon Ducks	40
5th	NC State Wolfpack	37
6th	Arizona Wildcats	36
7th	Nebraska Cornhuskers	34
8th	Arizona State Sun Devils	30
9th	Texas Woman's Pioneers	24
10th	Virginia Cavaliers	22

== Results ==
- Only results of finals are shown

100 m (+3.2 m/s)
Pl.	Name	Team	Mark
1st place, gold medalist(s)	Merlene Ottey	Nebraska Cornhuskers	11.20
2nd place, silver medalist(s)	Leleith Hodges	Texas Woman's Pioneers	11.24
3rd place, bronze medalist(s)	Jeanette Bolden	UCLA Bruins	11.23
4th	Benita Fitzgerald	Tennessee Volunteers	11.54
5th	Esmeralda Garcia	Florida State Seminoles	11.55
6th	Jennifer Innis	Cal State Los Angeles Golden Eagles	11.68
7th	Lisa Thompson	UNLV Rebels	11.85
8th	Tara Mastin	Houston Cougars	11.86

200 m (+1.0 m/s)
Pl.	Name	Team	Mark
1st place, gold medalist(s)	Merlene Ottey	Nebraska Cornhuskers	22.78
2nd place, silver medalist(s)	Florence Griffith	UCLA Bruins	23.11
3rd place, bronze medalist(s)	Randy Givens	Florida State Seminoles	23.72
4th	Michelle Matthias	New Mexico Lobos	23.77
5th	Jeanine Brown	UTEP Miners	23.80
6th	Melanie Batiste	Oregon Ducks	24.01
7th	Cheryl Gilliam	Michigan State Spartans	24.14
	Lisa Thompson	UNLV Rebels	DNF

400 m
Pl.	Name	Team	Mark
1st place, gold medalist(s)	Jackie Pusey	Cal State Los Angeles Golden Eagles	51.85
2nd place, silver medalist(s)	Marita Payne	Florida State Seminoles	52.01
3rd place, bronze medalist(s)	Arlise Emerson	UCLA Bruins	52.49
4th	Cathy Rattray	Tennessee Volunteers	52.84
5th	Robbin Coleman	Texas Longhorns	52.92
6th	Angela Wright	Florida State Seminoles	53.11
7th	Oralee Fowler	UCLA Bruins	53.48
	Charmaine Crooks	UTEP Miners	DNS

800 m
Pl.	Name	Team	Mark
1st place, gold medalist(s)	Leann Warren	Oregon Ducks	2:06.07
2nd place, silver medalist(s)	Delisa Walton	Tennessee Volunteers	2:08.37
3rd place, bronze medalist(s)	Joetta Clark	Tennessee Volunteers	2:08.79
4th	Doriane Lambelet	Cornell Big Red	2:09.21
5th	Catherine Baker	Rice Owls	2:09.45
6th	Terry Pioli	Penn State Nittany Lions	2:09.78
7th	Revah Knight	Grambling State Tigers	2:11.04
8th	Ranza Clark	Oregon Ducks	2:12.04

1500 m
Pl.	Name	Team	Mark
1st place, gold medalist(s)	Leann Warren	Oregon Ducks	4:15.00
2nd place, silver medalist(s)	Monica Joyce	San Diego State Aztecs	4:16.15
3rd place, bronze medalist(s)	Mary Rawe	Penn State Nittany Lions	4:17.05
4th	Linda Goen	UCLA Bruins	4:17.59
5th	Sandra Gregg	Washington Huskies	4:18.31
6th	Sheila Ralston	UCLA Bruins	4:18.76
7th	Patricia Murnane	Penn State Nittany Lions	4:19.83
8th	Jill Haworth	Virginia Cavaliers	NT
9th	Rose Thomson	Wisconsin Badgers	NT
10th	Andrea Marek	Purdue Boilermakers	NT
11th	Suzie Houston	Wisconsin Badgers	NT
12th	Margaret Coomber	Florida State Seminoles	NT

3000 m
Pl.	Name	Team	Mark
1st place, gold medalist(s)	Regina Joyce	Washington Huskies	9:00.2
2nd place, silver medalist(s)	Joan Hansen	Arizona Wildcats	9:09.5
3rd place, bronze medalist(s)	Suzanne Girard	NC State Wolfpack	9:23.6
4th	Cindy Duarte	Clemson Tigers	9:23.9
5th	Cynthia Schmandt	California Golden Bears	9:25.9
6th	Lisa O'Dea	Oregon Ducks	9:29.9
7th	Suzie Houston	Wisconsin Badgers	9:32.0
8th	Pia Palladino	Georgetown Hoyas	9:32.4
9th	Sandra Cullinane	NC State Wolfpack	9:33.1
10th	Constance Case	Oregon State Beavers	9:33.8
11th	Sue Overby	NC State Wolfpack	
12th	Darcy Tomlinson	Western Michigan Broncos	9:35.4
13th	Karen Campbell	Michigan State Spartans	9:35.9
14th	Mary Wright	Virginia Cavaliers	9:38.3
15th	Rose Thomson	Wisconsin Badgers	9:44.2
16th	Melanie Weaver	Michigan Wolverines	9:52.4

5000 m
Pl.	Name	Team	Mark
1st place, gold medalist(s)	Julie Shea	NC State Wolfpack	16:11.04
2nd place, silver medalist(s)	Mary Shea	NC State Wolfpack	16:16.02
3rd place, bronze medalist(s)	Betty Jo Springs	NC State Wolfpack	16:18.76
4th	Patsy Sharples	Idaho Vandals	16:25.88
5th	Susan Schaefer	Eastern Kentucky Colonels	16:28.43
6th	Eryn Forbes	Oregon Ducks	16:29.52
7th	Kathy Bryant	Tennessee Volunteers	16:31.59
8th	Letha Davis	Drake Bulldogs	16:39.60
9th	Kelly Spatz	Michigan State Spartans	16:42.72
10th	Margaret Cleary	Penn State Nittany Lions	16:45.99
11th	Marjorie Kaput	Arizona Wildcats	16:56.15
12th	Nan Doak	Iowa Hawkeyes	16:59.71
13th	Rochelle Racette	Minnesota Golden Gophers	17:04.27
14th	Ellen Lyons	Stanford Cardinal	17:06.72
15th	Lisa Last	Michigan State Spartans	17:12.06
16th	Lindy Nelson	Southern Illinois Salukis	17:12.42
17th	Marta Wilson	Wisconsin Badgers	17:19.81
	Kristen O'Connoll	Alabama Crimson Tide	DNF

10,000 m
Pl.	Name	Team	Mark
1st place, gold medalist(s)	Aileen O'Connor	Virginia Cavaliers	33:28.20
2nd place, silver medalist(s)	Patsy Sharples	Idaho Vandals	33:34.85
3rd place, bronze medalist(s)	Midde Hamrin	Lamar Lady Cardinals	33:37.48
4th	Betty Jo Springs	NC State Wolfpack	33:39.77
5th	Glenys Quick	Texas Woman's Pioneers	33:57.82
6th	Judi St. Hilaire	Vermont Catamounts	34:09.49
7th	Mary Shea	NC State Wolfpack	34:13.30
8th	Darien Andreau	Florida State Seminoles	34:47.50
9th	Letha Davis	Drake Bulldogs	34:51.20
10th	Nancy Seeger	Rutgers Scarlet Knights	34:56.60
11th	Kim Schnurpfeil	Stanford Cardinal	34:58.00
12th	Elizabeth Baker	San Diego State Aztecs	35:17.74
13th	Kellie Cathey	Oklahoma Sooners	35:22.76
14th	Ellen Lyons	Stanford Cardinal	35:22.94
15th	Anne Schiavone	Vermont Catamounts	35:29.16
16th	Michele Aubuchon	Cal State East Bay Pioneers	35:30.83
17th	Linda McLennan	Alabama Crimson Tide	35:40.58
18th	Bonnie Tamis	Colorado State Rams	35:42.29
19th	Mary Stepka	Wisconsin Badgers	35:51.67
20th	Jill Washburn	Michigan State Spartans	36:04.49
21st	Maria Trujillo	Arizona State Sun Devils	36:05.20
22nd	Deborah Ulian	Yale Bulldogs	36:21.52
	Ellen O'Malley	Brown Bears	DNF
	Michele Bush	UCLA Bruins	DNS

100 m hurdles (+0.7 m/s)
Pl.	Name	Team	Mark
1st place, gold medalist(s)	Benita Fitzgerald	Tennessee Volunteers	13.12
2nd place, silver medalist(s)	Candy Young	Fairleigh Dickinson Knights	13.37
3rd place, bronze medalist(s)	Linda Weekly	Texas Southern Tigers	13.38
4th	Kim Turner	UTEP Miners	13.39
5th	Brenda Calhoun	Arizona State Sun Devils	13.66
6th	Lori Dinello	Florida Gators	13.73
7th	Kim Willis	Ohio State Buckeyes	13.77
8th	Gwen Poss	Kansas Jayhawks	13.78

400 m hurdles
Pl.	Name	Team	Mark
1st place, gold medalist(s)	Tammy Etienne	Texas Longhorns	57.10
2nd place, silver medalist(s)	Edna Brown	Temple Owls	57.99
3rd place, bronze medalist(s)	Vivian Scruggs	Virginia Cavaliers	58.69
4th	Ellen Smith	Texas A&M Aggies	58.75
5th	Jill Lancaster	Oklahoma Sooners	59.03
6th	Denise Waddy	Arizona Wildcats	59.12
7th	Dana Wright	Old Dominion Monarchs	1:00.20
8th	Almetha Roland	Florida State Seminoles	1:00.30

4 × 100 m relay
Pl.	Name	Team	Mark
1st place, gold medalist(s)	Esmeralda Garcia	Florida State Seminoles	44.35
1st place, gold medalist(s)	Marita Payne	Florida State Seminoles	44.35
1st place, gold medalist(s)	Alice Bennett	Florida State Seminoles	44.35
1st place, gold medalist(s)	Randy Givens	Florida State Seminoles	44.35
2nd place, silver medalist(s)	Jeanette Bolden	UCLA Bruins	44.49
2nd place, silver medalist(s)	Sherri Howard	UCLA Bruins	44.49
2nd place, silver medalist(s)	Florence Griffith	UCLA Bruins	44.49
2nd place, silver medalist(s)	Missy Jerald	UCLA Bruins	44.49
3rd place, bronze medalist(s)	Leleith Hodges	Texas Woman's Pioneers	44.95
3rd place, bronze medalist(s)	Frances Punch	Texas Woman's Pioneers	44.95
3rd place, bronze medalist(s)	Karen Holmes	Texas Woman's Pioneers	44.95
3rd place, bronze medalist(s)	Ruth Simpson	Texas Woman's Pioneers	44.95
4th	Jennifer Innis	Cal State Los Angeles Golden Eagles	45.15
4th	Sandra Howard	Cal State Los Angeles Golden Eagles	45.15
4th	Smith	Cal State Los Angeles Golden Eagles	45.15
4th	Jackie Pusey	Cal State Los Angeles Golden Eagles	45.15
5th	Charlotte Zepherin	New Mexico Lobos	45.63
5th	Amanda Fields	New Mexico Lobos	45.63
5th	Peggy Mallory	New Mexico Lobos	45.63
5th	Michelle Matthias	New Mexico Lobos	45.63
6th	Rhonda Yancey	Morgan State Lady Bears	46.05
6th	Janet Dodson	Morgan State Lady Bears	46.05
6th	Evalene Hatcher	Morgan State Lady Bears	46.05
6th	Roberta Belle	Morgan State Lady Bears	46.05
7th	Esther Otieno	UTEP Miners	46.11
7th	Doreen Hayward	UTEP Miners	46.11
7th	Nendra Simpson	UTEP Miners	46.11
7th	Jeanine Brown	UTEP Miners	46.11
8th	Val Boyer	Arizona State Sun Devils	46.15
8th	Anna Van	Arizona State Sun Devils	46.15
8th	Jocelyn Bentley	Arizona State Sun Devils	46.15
8th	Brenda Calhoun	Arizona State Sun Devils	46.15

4 × 400 m relay
Pl.	Name	Team	Mark
1st place, gold medalist(s)	Cathy Rattray	Tennessee Volunteers	3:31.70
1st place, gold medalist(s)	Sharrieffa Barksdale	Tennessee Volunteers	3:31.70
1st place, gold medalist(s)	Joetta Clark	Tennessee Volunteers	3:31.70
1st place, gold medalist(s)	Delisa Walton	Tennessee Volunteers	3:31.70
2nd place, silver medalist(s)	Cindy Cumbess	UCLA Bruins	3:32.08
2nd place, silver medalist(s)	Sherri Howard	UCLA Bruins	3:32.08
2nd place, silver medalist(s)	Arlise Emerson	UCLA Bruins	3:32.08
2nd place, silver medalist(s)	Oralee Fowler	UCLA Bruins	3:32.08
3rd place, bronze medalist(s)	Melanie Batiste	Oregon Ducks	3:34.13
3rd place, bronze medalist(s)	Rhonda Massey	Oregon Ducks	3:34.13
3rd place, bronze medalist(s)	Lena Fritzson	Oregon Ducks	3:34.13
3rd place, bronze medalist(s)	Grace Bakari	Oregon Ducks	3:34.13
4th	Angela Wright	Florida State Seminoles	3:34.80
4th	Scooby Golden	Florida State Seminoles	3:34.80
4th	Janette Wood	Florida State Seminoles	3:34.80
4th	Marita Payne	Florida State Seminoles	3:34.80
5th	Tammy Etienne	Texas Longhorns	3:36.73
5th	Julie Holmes	Texas Longhorns	3:36.73
5th	Donna Sherfield	Texas Longhorns	3:36.73
5th	Robbin Coleman	Texas Longhorns	3:36.73
6th	Felicia Moore	Oklahoma Sooners	3:38.05
6th	Maureen Houghton	Oklahoma Sooners	3:38.05
6th	Annette Campbell	Oklahoma Sooners	3:38.05
6th	Jill Lancaster	Oklahoma Sooners	3:38.05
7th	Brenda Brown	Virginia Cavaliers	3:40.97
7th	Vivian Scruggs	Virginia Cavaliers	3:40.97
7th	Karen Hatchett	Virginia Cavaliers	3:40.97
7th	Lisa Garrett	Virginia Cavaliers	3:40.97
8th	Jan Dixon	Morgan State Lady Bears	3:41.05
8th	Willetta Page	Morgan State Lady Bears	3:41.05
8th	Cheryl Cook	Morgan State Lady Bears	3:41.05
8th	Evalene Hatcher	Morgan State Lady Bears	3:41.05

4 × 800 m relay
Pl.	Name	Team	Mark
1st place, gold medalist(s)	Sue Beischel	Wisconsin Badgers	8:53.44
1st place, gold medalist(s)	Maryann Brunner	Wisconsin Badgers	8:53.44
1st place, gold medalist(s)	Ellen Brewster	Wisconsin Badgers	8:53.44
1st place, gold medalist(s)	Sue Spaltholz	Wisconsin Badgers	8:53.44
2nd place, silver medalist(s)	Wren Schafer	Iowa State Cyclones	8:59.14
2nd place, silver medalist(s)	Patty McCarthy	Iowa State Cyclones	8:59.14
2nd place, silver medalist(s)	Christine McMeekin	Iowa State Cyclones	8:59.14
2nd place, silver medalist(s)	Diane Vetter	Iowa State Cyclones	8:59.14
3rd place, bronze medalist(s)	Sara Stricker	Nebraska Cornhuskers	9:02.80
3rd place, bronze medalist(s)	Lisa Kramer	Nebraska Cornhuskers	9:02.80
3rd place, bronze medalist(s)	Pam Schubarth	Nebraska Cornhuskers	9:02.80
3rd place, bronze medalist(s)	Tami Essington	Nebraska Cornhuskers	9:02.80
4th	Linda Nicholson	Virginia Cavaliers	9:03.83
4th	Vivan Scruggs	Virginia Cavaliers	9:03.83
4th	Mary Waller	Virginia Cavaliers	9:03.83
4th	Jill Haworth	Virginia Cavaliers	9:03.83
5th	Lana Zimmerman	LSU Lady Tigers	9:04.09
5th	Francine Gilmore	LSU Lady Tigers	9:04.09
5th	Michelle Gross	LSU Lady Tigers	9:04.09
5th	Tina Bengston	LSU Lady Tigers	9:04.09
6th	Deb Pihl	Kansas State Wildcats	9:05.74
6th	Janel LeValley	Kansas State Wildcats	9:05.74
6th	Sherry Thomas	Kansas State Wildcats	9:05.74
6th	Wanda Trent	Kansas State Wildcats	9:05.74
7th	Felicia Anderson	Texas Longhorns	9:14.18
7th	Heidi Hansen	Texas Longhorns	9:14.18
7th	Maryanne Pils	Texas Longhorns	9:14.18
7th	Ann Morell	Texas Longhorns	9:14.18
8th	Penny O'Brien	Iowa Hawkeyes	9:16.94
8th	Denise Camarigg	Iowa Hawkeyes	9:16.94
8th	Julie Williams	Iowa Hawkeyes	9:16.94
8th	Kay Stormo	Iowa Hawkeyes	9:16.94

Sprint medley relay (Note: Held at a total distance of 800 m, with the first two legs running 100 m, the third leg running 200 m, and the anchor leg running 400 m.)
Pl.	Name	Team	Mark
1st place, gold medalist(s)	Sharrieffa Barksdale	Tennessee Volunteers	1:36.70
1st place, gold medalist(s)	Cathy Rattray	Tennessee Volunteers	1:36.70
1st place, gold medalist(s)	Benita Fitzgerald	Tennessee Volunteers	1:36.70
1st place, gold medalist(s)	Delisa Walton	Tennessee Volunteers	1:36.70
2nd place, silver medalist(s)	Missy Jerald	UCLA Bruins	1:37.41
2nd place, silver medalist(s)	Jeanette Bolden	UCLA Bruins	1:37.41
2nd place, silver medalist(s)	Florence Griffith	UCLA Bruins	1:37.41
2nd place, silver medalist(s)	Sherri Howard	UCLA Bruins	1:37.41
3rd place, bronze medalist(s)	Bowie	Cal State Los Angeles Golden Eagles	1:39.06
3rd place, bronze medalist(s)	Sandra Howard	Cal State Los Angeles Golden Eagles	1:39.06
3rd place, bronze medalist(s)	Jennifer Innis	Cal State Los Angeles Golden Eagles	1:39.06
3rd place, bronze medalist(s)	Jackie Pusey	Cal State Los Angeles Golden Eagles	1:39.06
4th	Rhonda Yancey	Morgan State Lady Bears	1:39.35
4th	Janet Dodson	Morgan State Lady Bears	1:39.35
4th	Nellie Bullock	Morgan State Lady Bears	1:39.35
4th	Roberta Belle	Morgan State Lady Bears	1:39.35
5th	Bea Reese	UTEP Miners	1:39.42
5th	Doreen Hayward	UTEP Miners	1:39.42
5th	Jeanine Brown	UTEP Miners	1:39.42
5th	Charmaine Crooks	UTEP Miners	1:39.42
6th	Esmeralda Garcia	Florida State Seminoles	1:40.09
6th	Alice Bennett	Florida State Seminoles	1:40.09
6th	Randy Givens	Florida State Seminoles	1:40.09
6th	Marita Payne	Florida State Seminoles	1:40.09
7th	Julie Bergeron	North Texas Mean Green	1:41.96
7th	Joan Bennett	North Texas Mean Green	1:41.96
7th	Debra Pinnix	North Texas Mean Green	1:41.96
7th	Smith	North Texas Mean Green	1:41.96
8th	Brenda Calhoun	Arizona State Sun Devils	1:42.80
8th	Jocelyn Bentley	Arizona State Sun Devils	1:42.80
8th	Val Boyer	Arizona State Sun Devils	1:42.80
8th	Sharon Acker	Arizona State Sun Devils	1:42.80

High jump
Pl.	Name	Team	Mark
1st place, gold medalist(s)	Coleen Reinstra	Arizona State Sun Devils	1.83 m
2nd place, silver medalist(s)	Maria Betioli	BYU Cougars	1.80 m
2nd place, silver medalist(s)	Ann Bair	Virginia Cavaliers	1.80 m
2nd place, silver medalist(s)	Louise Ritter	Texas Woman's Pioneers	1.80 m
5th	Disa Gisladottir	Alabama Crimson Tide	1.80 m
6th	Maggie Garrison	Washington Huskies	1.80 m
6th	Phyllis Bluntson	Cal State Bakersfield Roadrunners	1.80 m
8th	Carolyn Forde	Lamar Lady Cardinals	1.80 m
9th	Patricia Stafford	San Diego State Aztecs	1.75 m
10th	Sharon Burrill	Nebraska Cornhuskers	1.75 m
10th	Sybil Reddick	Texas Southern Tigers	1.75 m
12th	Anne Erpenbeck	Drake Bulldogs	NH

Long jump
Pl.	Name	Team	Mark
1st place, gold medalist(s)	Donna Thomas	North Texas Mean Green	6.34 m
2nd place, silver medalist(s)	Esmeralda Garcia	Florida State Seminoles	6.31 m
3rd place, bronze medalist(s)	Pat Johnson	Wisconsin Badgers	6.25 m
4th	Esther Otieno	UTEP Miners	6.05 m
5th	Evalene Hatcher	Morgan State Lady Bears	6.02 m
6th	Sharon Moultrie	Texas Tech Red Raiders	5.85 m
7th	Becky Jo Kaiser	Illinois Fighting Illini	5.84 m
8th	Kathy Rankins	Georgia Bulldogs	5.74 m
9th	Michelle Kelly	UC Irvine Anteaters	5.65 m
10th	Alice Bennett	Florida State Seminoles	5.64 m
11th	Tudie McKnight	Kansas Jayhawks	5.55 m
12th	Jennifer Innis	Cal State Los Angeles Golden Eagles	5.50 m

Shot put
Pl.	Name	Team	Mark
1st place, gold medalist(s)	Meg Ritchie	Arizona Wildcats	17.40 m
2nd place, silver medalist(s)	Rosemarie Hauch	Tennessee Volunteers	16.38 m
3rd place, bronze medalist(s)	Sandy Burke	Northeastern Huskies	16.14 m
4th	Elaine Sobansky	Penn State Nittany Lions	16.10 m
5th	Ramona Pagel	Long Beach State Beach	15.90 m
6th	Cecil Hansen	Oklahoma Sooners	15.85 m
7th	Oneithea Davis	St. John's Red Storm	15.34 m
8th	Ria Stalman	Arizona State Sun Devils	15.33 m
9th	Cindy Crapper	Kentucky Wildcats	15.03 m
10th	Caryl Van Pelt	Washington Huskies	14.99 m
11th	Susie Ray	UCLA Bruins	14.85 m
12th	Carol Cady	Stanford Cardinal	14.30 m

Discus throw
Pl.	Name	Team	Mark
1st place, gold medalist(s)	Ria Stalman	Arizona State Sun Devils	60.44 m
2nd place, silver medalist(s)	Meg Ritchie	Arizona Wildcats	56.34 m
3rd place, bronze medalist(s)	Leslie Deniz	Arizona State Sun Devils	53.12 m
4th	Laura Messner	Texas Longhorns	49.96 m
5th	Penny Neer	Michigan Wolverines	49.86 m
6th	Victoria Bowman	Western Kentucky Lady Toppers	49.70 m
7th	Carol Cady	Stanford Cardinal	49.00 m
8th	Pat Herrington	Idaho State Bengals	48.80 m
9th	Leslie Hoerner	Long Beach State Beach	48.42 m
10th	Karen McDonald	Oregon Ducks	43.88 m
11th	Betty Bogers	UTEP Miners	42.66 m
12th	Pat Shaw	Long Beach State Beach	42.56 m

Javelin throw
Pl.	Name	Team	Mark
1st place, gold medalist(s)	Sally Harmon	Oregon Ducks	54.26 m
2nd place, silver medalist(s)	Sue Gibson	Alabama Crimson Tide	53.58 m
3rd place, bronze medalist(s)	Dana Olson	Houston Cougars	52.86 m
4th	Mary Osborne	Stanford Cardinal	51.72 m
5th	Jacque Nelson	UCLA Bruins	51.56 m
6th	Lorri Kokkola	Western Kentucky Lady Toppers	50.56 m
7th	Jeanne Eggart	Washington State Cougars	49.82 m
8th	Debbie Williams	Michigan Wolverines	48.40 m
9th	Donna Mayhew	Arizona Wildcats	48.36 m
10th	Marilyn Senz	Penn State Nittany Lions	48.32 m
11th	Deanna Carr	Washington Huskies	46.36 m
12th	Cheryl Novak	Western Illinois Leathernecks	44.94 m

Heptathlon
Pl.	Name	Team	Mark
1st place, gold medalist(s)	Patsy Walker	Houston Cougars	5662 pts
2nd place, silver medalist(s)	Nancy Kindig	Nebraska Cornhuskers	5585 pts
3rd place, bronze medalist(s)	Jackie Joyner	UCLA Bruins	5578 pts
4th	Cynthia Greiner	Oregon State Beavers	5420 pts
5th	Carrie McLaughlin	San Diego State Aztecs	5372 pts
6th	Susan Brownell	Virginia Cavaliers	5311 pts
7th	Kerry Zwart	USC Trojans	5228 pts
8th	Myrtle Chester	Tennessee Volunteers	5189 pts
9th	Debra Deutsch	Rutgers Scarlet Knights	5041 pts
10th	Karen Roth	Illinois State Redbirds	4875 pts
11th	Sonya Crowther	Oregon State Beavers	4837 pts
12th	Rene Nickles	Oklahoma Sooners	4654 pts
13th	Sondra Obermeier	Nebraska Cornhuskers	3553 pts
	Tonya Alston	UCLA Bruins	DNF (Note: Scored 1031 points through 3 events)

== See also ==
- Association for Intercollegiate Athletics for Women championships § Outdoor track and field
- 1981 AIAW Indoor Track and Field Championships
- 1981 NCAA Division I Outdoor Track and Field Championships
