= 1981 AIAW Indoor Track and Field Championships =

- Dates: March 13–14, 1981
- Host city: Pocatello, Idaho
- Venue: ASISU Minidome
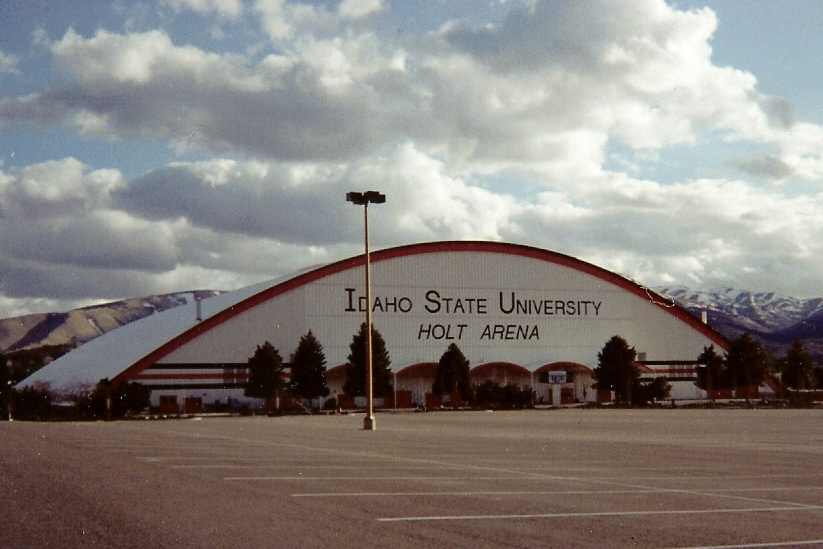

The 1981 AIAW Indoor Track And Field Championships, also known as the EAIAW Indoor Track and Field Championships, were the 4th annual Association for Intercollegiate Athletics for Women-sanctioned track meet to determine the individual and team national champions of women's collegiate indoor track and field events in the United States. They were contested March 13−14, 1981 in Pocatello, Idaho at the ASISU Minidome and won by the Virginia Cavaliers track and field team.

Unlike other AIAW-sponsored sports, there were not separate Division I, II, and III championships for indoor track and field. At the championships, Merlene Ottey set a world record in the indoor 300 meters.

== Team standings ==
- Scoring: 10 points for a 1st-place finish, 8 points for 2nd, 6 points for 3rd, 4 points for 4th, 2 points for 5th, and 1 point for 6th. Ties were decided by comparing each team's number of first-place finishes, followed by number of second-place finishes, going on until the tie is broken. Only top 10 teams are listed.

Rank	Team	Points
1st place, gold medalist(s)	Virginia Cavaliers	48
2nd place, silver medalist(s)	Florida State Seminoles	46
3rd place, bronze medalist(s)	Tennessee Volunteers	46
4th	Nebraska Cornhuskers	45
5th	Wisconsin Badgers	41
6th	Michigan State Spartans	23
7th	Oklahoma Sooners	23
8th	Houston Cougars	20
9th	Arizona Wildcats	19
10th	Adelphi Panthers	18

== Results ==
- Only results of finals are shown

60 meters
Pl.	Name	Team	Mark
1st place, gold medalist(s)	Merlene Ottey	Nebraska Cornhuskers	7.24
2nd place, silver medalist(s)	Esmeralda Garcia	Florida State Seminoles	7.35
3rd place, bronze medalist(s)	Lisa Thompson	UNLV Rebels	7.41
4th	Tara Mastin	Houston Cougars	7.48
5th	Sherri Funn	George Mason Patriots	7.51
6th	Cheryl Gilliam	Michigan State Spartans	7.53

300 meters
Pl.	Name	Team	Mark
1st place, gold medalist(s)	Merlene Ottey	Nebraska Cornhuskers	35.83 WR
2nd place, silver medalist(s)	Sharon Colyear	Boston University Terriers	37.46
3rd place, bronze medalist(s)	Robin Jackson	Wisconsin Badgers	37.98
4th	Normalee Murray	Nebraska Cornhuskers	38.41
5th	Cathy Rattray	Tennessee Volunteers	39.15
6th	Gail Stephens	Eastern Illinois Panthers	40.42

400 meters
Pl.	Name	Team	Mark
1st place, gold medalist(s)	Pam Moore	Wisconsin Badgers	53.88
2nd place, silver medalist(s)	Lisa Garrett	Virginia Cavaliers	54.07
3rd place, bronze medalist(s)	Charmaine Crooks	UTEP Miners	54.19
4th	Angela Wright	Florida State Seminoles	54.37
5th	Gwen Murray	Pittsburgh Panthers	55.00
6th	Annette Campbell	Oklahoma Sooners	56.79

600 meters
Pl.	Name	Team	Mark
1st place, gold medalist(s)	Delisa Walton	Tennessee Volunteers	1:26.56
2nd place, silver medalist(s)	Pam Sedwick	Michigan State Spartans	1:28.82
3rd place, bronze medalist(s)	Wanda Trent	Kansas State Wildcats	1:30.20
4th	Barbara Ennis	Indiana Hoosiers	1:32.74
5th	Jill Lancaster	Oklahoma Sooners	1:32.76
6th	Rosalyn Dunlap	Missouri Tigers	1:42.42

800 meters
Pl.	Name	Team	Mark
1st place, gold medalist(s)	Darlene Beckford	Harvard Crimson	2:05.75
2nd place, silver medalist(s)	Joetta Clark	Tennessee Volunteers	2:06.36
3rd place, bronze medalist(s)	Maureen Houghton	Oklahoma Sooners	2:13.16
4th	Doriane Lambelet	Cornell Big Red	2:34.73
	Rochelle Collins	UTEP Miners	DNF

1000 meters
Pl.	Name	Team	Mark
1st place, gold medalist(s)	Josephine White	Richmond Spiders	2:43.33
2nd place, silver medalist(s)	Ilena Hocking	North Texas Mean Green	2:47.12
3rd place, bronze medalist(s)	Margaret Coomber	Florida State Seminoles	2:47.25
4th	Rose Thompson	Wisconsin Badgers	2:48.52
5th	Marie Simonsson	Drake Bulldogs	2:48.95
6th	Diane Vetter	Iowa State Cyclones	2:50.43
7th	Deb Pihl	Kansas State Wildcats	2:51.66
8th	Tina Bengtsson	LSU Lady Tigers	2:54.18
9th	Susanne Fredrick	Michigan Wolverines	3:02.44

1500 meters
Pl.	Name	Team	Mark
1st place, gold medalist(s)	Jill Haworth	Virginia Cavaliers	4:25.20
2nd place, silver medalist(s)	Joan Hansen	Arizona Wildcats	4:26.53
3rd place, bronze medalist(s)	Sue Shea	Villanova Wildcats	4:28.15
4th	Linda Portasik	Tennessee Volunteers	4:31.66
5th	Jody Rittenhouse	Arkansas Razorbacks	4:37.89
6th	Carleen Thon	Colorado Buffaloes	4:39.0
7th	Penny O'Brien	Iowa Hawkeyes	4:42.03
8th	Linda Datlefsen	Georgia Bulldogs	4:59.66

3000 meters
Pl.	Name	Team	Mark
1st place, gold medalist(s)	Patricia Sharples	Idaho Vandals	9:33.96
2nd place, silver medalist(s)	Kelly Spatz	Michigan State Spartans	9:34.59
3rd place, bronze medalist(s)	Mary Rawe	Penn State Nittany Lions	9:35.84
4th	Cindy Duarte	Clemson Tigers	9:45.85
5th	Aileen O'Connor	Virginia Cavaliers	9:46.75
6th	Debra Tavik	Maryland Terrapins	9:48.03
7th	Nancy Scardioa	New Hampshire Wildcats	9:49.6
8th	Judith McCrone	UMass Minutewomen	9:54.2
9th	Liz Hjalmarsson	Drake Bulldogs	NT
10th	Nan Doak	Iowa Hawkeyes	NT
11th	Joan Hansen	Arizona Wildcats	NT
12th	Mariana Dickerson	Illinois Fighting Illini	NT
13th	Judy Parker	Iowa Hawkeyes	NT
14th	Kim Bird	Tennessee Volunteers	NT
15th	Rebecca Cotta	Purdue Boilermakers	NT
16th	Karen Campbell	Michigan State Spartans	NT

5000 meters
Pl.	Name	Team	Mark
1st place, gold medalist(s)	Aileen O'Connor	Virginia Cavaliers	16:33.6
2nd place, silver medalist(s)	Kim Schnurpfeil	Stanford Cardinal	16:38.0
3rd place, bronze medalist(s)	Kellie Cathey	Oklahoma Sooners	16:51.6
4th	Kathy Mills	Penn State Nittany Lions	16:54.9
5th	Darien Andrew	Florida State Seminoles	17:06.6
6th	Marjorie Kaput	Arizona Wildcats	17:09.2
7th	Margaret Cleary	Penn State Nittany Lions	17:17.7
8th	Nancy Seeger	Rutgers Scarlet Knights	17:20.8
9th	Judy Parker	Iowa Hawkeyes	17:22.7
10th	Lisa Last	Michigan State Spartans	17:28.9
11th	Nan Doak	Iowa Hawkeyes	17:32.4
12th	Melanie Weaver	Michigan Wolverines	17:32.6
13th	Letha Davis	Drake Bulldogs	17:35.8
14th	Eileen Hornberger	Tennessee Volunteers	17:48.9
15th	Terry Ebanks	Texas Longhorns	17:49.2
16th	Zanetta Weber	Iowa Hawkeyes	17:49.5
17th	Donna Ganly	Missouri Tigers	17:54.0
18th	Mary Jean Wright	Virginia Cavaliers	18:24.7

4 × 200 meters relay
Pl.	Name	Team	Mark
1st place, gold medalist(s)	Esmeralda Garcia	Florida State Seminoles	1:36.88
1st place, gold medalist(s)	Marita Payne	Florida State Seminoles	1:36.88
1st place, gold medalist(s)	Alice Bennett	Florida State Seminoles	1:36.88
1st place, gold medalist(s)	Randy Givens	Florida State Seminoles	1:36.88
2nd place, silver medalist(s)	Marva Fearon	Adelphi Panthers	1:37.55
2nd place, silver medalist(s)	Cheryl Innis	Adelphi Panthers	1:37.55
2nd place, silver medalist(s)	Marilyn Gilliard	Adelphi Panthers	1:37.55
2nd place, silver medalist(s)	June Griffith	Adelphi Panthers	1:37.55
3rd place, bronze medalist(s)	Rachel Clary	Houston Cougars	1:37.73
3rd place, bronze medalist(s)	Cruz Ibarguen	Houston Cougars	1:37.73
3rd place, bronze medalist(s)	Tara Mastin	Houston Cougars	1:37.73
3rd place, bronze medalist(s)	Darlene Jefferson	Houston Cougars	1:37.73
4th	Benita Fitzgerald	Tennessee Volunteers	1:37.82
4th	Lisa Sherrill	Tennessee Volunteers	1:37.82
4th	Sharrieffa Barksdale	Tennessee Volunteers	1:37.82
4th	Paula Hines	Tennessee Volunteers	1:37.82
5th	Cathy Barber	Kentucky Wildcats	1:38.49
5th	Antionette Browning	Kentucky Wildcats	1:38.49
5th	Liz Browning	Kentucky Wildcats	1:38.49
5th	Judy Richardson	Kentucky Wildcats	1:38.49
6th	Venita McDavid	Temple Owls	1:41.6
6th	Gladys Boone	Temple Owls	1:41.6
6th	Amy Whicker	Temple Owls	1:41.6
6th	Lesvia Jackson	Temple Owls	1:41.6

4 × 400 meters relay
Pl.	Name	Team	Mark
1st place, gold medalist(s)	Marva Fearon	Adelphi Panthers	3:37.28
1st place, gold medalist(s)	Cheryl Innis	Adelphi Panthers	3:37.28
1st place, gold medalist(s)	Marilyn Gilliard	Adelphi Panthers	3:37.28
1st place, gold medalist(s)	June Griffith	Adelphi Panthers	3:37.28
2nd place, silver medalist(s)	Tammy Etienne	Texas Longhorns	3:37.88
2nd place, silver medalist(s)	Julie Holmes	Texas Longhorns	3:37.88
2nd place, silver medalist(s)	Donna Sherfield	Texas Longhorns	3:37.88
2nd place, silver medalist(s)	Robbin Coleman	Texas Longhorns	3:37.88
3rd place, bronze medalist(s)	Lisa Sherrill	Tennessee Volunteers	3:38.88
3rd place, bronze medalist(s)	Cathy Rattray	Tennessee Volunteers	3:38.88
3rd place, bronze medalist(s)	Joetta Clark	Tennessee Volunteers	3:38.88
3rd place, bronze medalist(s)	Delisa Walton	Tennessee Volunteers	3:38.88
4th	Debbie Moss	Florida State Seminoles	3:40.57
4th	Angie Wright	Florida State Seminoles	3:40.57
4th	Scooby Golden	Florida State Seminoles	3:40.57
4th	Marita Payne	Florida State Seminoles	3:40.57
5th	Leisa Biggers	UTEP Miners	3:43.86
5th	Bea Reese	UTEP Miners	3:43.86
5th	Zenobia Haynes	UTEP Miners	3:43.86
5th	Jeanine Brown	UTEP Miners	3:43.86
6th	Normalee Murray	Nebraska Cornhuskers	3:47.20
6th	Tami Essington	Nebraska Cornhuskers	3:47.20
6th	Cheryl Zajic	Nebraska Cornhuskers	3:47.20
6th	Merlene Ottey	Nebraska Cornhuskers	3:47.20

4 × 800 meters relay
Pl.	Name	Team	Mark
1st place, gold medalist(s)	Sue Beischel	Wisconsin Badgers	8:44.26
1st place, gold medalist(s)	Maryann Brunner	Wisconsin Badgers	8:44.26
1st place, gold medalist(s)	Ellen Brewster	Wisconsin Badgers	8:44.26
1st place, gold medalist(s)	Sue Spaltohlz	Wisconsin Badgers	8:44.26
2nd place, silver medalist(s)	Tami Essington	Nebraska Cornhuskers	8:44.63
2nd place, silver medalist(s)	Lisa Kramer	Nebraska Cornhuskers	8:44.63
2nd place, silver medalist(s)	Pam Schubarth	Nebraska Cornhuskers	8:44.63
2nd place, silver medalist(s)	Sara Stricker	Nebraska Cornhuskers	8:44.63
3rd place, bronze medalist(s)	Sue Shea	Villanova Wildcats	8:47.02
3rd place, bronze medalist(s)	Lisa Maree	Villanova Wildcats	8:47.02
3rd place, bronze medalist(s)	Pat Bradley	Villanova Wildcats	8:47.02
3rd place, bronze medalist(s)	Jennifer Whitfield	Villanova Wildcats	8:47.02
4th	Tammy Etienne	Texas Longhorns	8:48.65
4th	Ann Morell	Texas Longhorns	8:48.65
4th	Felecia Anderson	Texas Longhorns	8:48.65
4th	Robbin Coleman	Texas Longhorns	8:48.65
5th	Vivian Scruggs	Virginia Cavaliers	8:48.83
5th	Linda Nicholson	Virginia Cavaliers	8:48.83
5th	Marisa Schmitt	Virginia Cavaliers	8:48.83
5th	Jill Haworth	Virginia Cavaliers	8:48.83
6th	Sara Cashen	Georgetown Hoyas	8:54.18
6th	Marya Small	Georgetown Hoyas	8:54.18
6th	Joanne Sincero	Georgetown Hoyas	8:54.18
6th	Christine Mullen	Georgetown Hoyas	8:54.18
7th	Penny Fales	Penn State Nittany Lions	8:56.39
7th	Patricia Murane	Penn State Nittany Lions	8:56.39
7th	Dorene Startare	Penn State Nittany Lions	8:56.39
7th	Mary Rawe	Penn State Nittany Lions	8:56.39
8th	Penny O'Brien	Iowa Hawkeyes	8:57.94
8th	Denise Camarigg	Iowa Hawkeyes	8:57.94
8th	Julie Williams	Iowa Hawkeyes	8:57.94
8th	Kay Stormo	Iowa Hawkeyes	8:57.94
9th	Carol Sames	Oklahoma Sooners	8:58.40
9th	Jill Lancaster	Oklahoma Sooners	8:58.40
9th	Siri Bielland	Oklahoma Sooners	8:58.40
9th	Maureen Houghton	Oklahoma Sooners	8:58.40
10th	Alverretta Pitts	Florida Gators	9:19.00
10th	Denise Marini	Florida Gators	9:19.00
10th	Donna Campbell	Florida Gators	9:19.00
10th	Nancy Robinson	Florida Gators	9:19.00
11th	Karen Sanford	Wyoming Cowgirls	9:22.00
11th	Laura Anderson	Wyoming Cowgirls	9:22.00
11th	Stephenie Paine	Wyoming Cowgirls	9:22.00
11th	Jaunita Neff	Wyoming Cowgirls	9:22.00

Distance medley relay
Pl.	Name	Team	Mark
1st place, gold medalist(s)	Wren Schafer	Iowa State Cyclones	11:24.04
1st place, gold medalist(s)	Sumetia Wells	Iowa State Cyclones	11:24.04
1st place, gold medalist(s)	Diane Vetter	Iowa State Cyclones	11:24.04
1st place, gold medalist(s)	Christine McMeekin	Iowa State Cyclones	11:24.04
2nd place, silver medalist(s)	Vivian Scruggs	Virginia Cavaliers	11:26.80
2nd place, silver medalist(s)	Brenda Brown	Virginia Cavaliers	11:26.80
2nd place, silver medalist(s)	Linda Nicholson	Virginia Cavaliers	11:26.80
2nd place, silver medalist(s)	Jill Haworth	Virginia Cavaliers	11:26.80
3rd place, bronze medalist(s)	Pam Sedwick	Michigan State Spartans	11:30.60
3rd place, bronze medalist(s)	Judi Brown	Michigan State Spartans	11:30.60
3rd place, bronze medalist(s)	Ann Pewe	Michigan State Spartans	11:30.60
3rd place, bronze medalist(s)	Kelly Spatz	Michigan State Spartans	11:30.60
4th	Penny Fales	Penn State Nittany Lions	11:32.47
4th	Tammie Hart	Penn State Nittany Lions	11:32.47
4th	Doreen Startare	Penn State Nittany Lions	11:32.47
4th	Mary Rawe	Penn State Nittany Lions	11:32.47
5th	Carol Sames	Oklahoma Sooners	11:32.56
5th	Felicia Moore	Oklahoma Sooners	11:32.56
5th	Siri Bielland	Oklahoma Sooners	11:32.56
5th	Kellie Cathey	Oklahoma Sooners	11:32.56
6th	Sue Spaltohlz	Wisconsin Badgers	11:36.02
6th	Pam Moore	Wisconsin Badgers	11:36.02
6th	Ellen Brewster	Wisconsin Badgers	11:36.02
6th	Suzie Houston	Wisconsin Badgers	11:36.02
7th	Jennifer Whitfield	Villanova Wildcats	11:38.83
7th	Pat Bradley	Villanova Wildcats	11:38.83
7th	Lisa Maree	Villanova Wildcats	11:38.83
7th	Sue Shea	Villanova Wildcats	11:38.83
8th	Holly Straight	Kentucky Wildcats	11:40.58
8th	Judy Richardson	Kentucky Wildcats	11:40.58
8th	Denise Kiernan	Kentucky Wildcats	11:40.58
8th	Bernadette Madigan	Kentucky Wildcats	11:40.58
9th	Kay Stormo	Iowa Hawkeyes	11:47.97
9th	Chris Davenport	Iowa Hawkeyes	11:47.97
9th	Julie Williams	Iowa Hawkeyes	11:47.97
9th	Penny O'Brien	Iowa Hawkeyes	11:47.97
10th	Mara Small	Georgetown Hoyas	11:49.54
10th	Joanne Sincero	Georgetown Hoyas	11:49.54
10th	Christine Mullen	Georgetown Hoyas	11:49.54
10th	Pia Palladino	Georgetown Hoyas	11:49.54
11th	Sherry Thomas	Kansas State Wildcats	12:04.91
11th	Wanda Trent	Kansas State Wildcats	12:04.91
11th	Janet LeValley	Kansas State Wildcats	12:04.91
11th	Deborah Pihl	Kansas State Wildcats	12:04.91
12th	Margaret Smith	Missouri Tigers	12:26.46
12th	Lynn Biggs	Missouri Tigers	12:26.46
12th	Linda Seale	Missouri Tigers	12:26.46
12th	Mary Kunkle	Missouri Tigers	12:26.46

High jump
Pl.	Name	Team	Mark
1st place, gold medalist(s)	Coleen Reinstra	Arizona State Sun Devils	1.91 m
2nd place, silver medalist(s)	Sharon Burrill	Nebraska Cornhuskers	1.84 m
3rd place, bronze medalist(s)	Edith Childress	Kentucky Wildcats	1.81 m
4th	Anne Erpenbeck	Drake Bulldogs	1.81 m
4th	Dale Thelma Wallace	Georgia Bulldogs	1.81 m
6th	Peggy Stewart	Villanova Wildcats	1.78 m
7th	Maria Betioli	BYU Cougars	1.78 m
8th	Ellie Hayden	Eastern Michigan Eagles	1.78 m
9th	Karen Krawiec	Penn State Nittany Lions	1.75 m
10th	Joan Brochaus	Wisconsin Badgers	1.75 m
11th	Anneke Magandans	UTEP Miners	1.75 m
12th	Patsy Walker	Houston Cougars	1.75 m
13th	Inge-Lisa Christiensen	Ohio State Buckeyes	1.72 m
13th	Sally McCarthy	Oklahoma Sooners	1.72 m
15th	Renee Nickles	Oklahoma Sooners	1.72 m
16th	Cathy Seybold	Nebraska Cornhuskers	1.67 m

Long jump
Pl.	Name	Team	Mark
1st place, gold medalist(s)	Pat Johnson	Wisconsin Badgers	6.40 m
2nd place, silver medalist(s)	Esmeralda Garcia	Florida State Seminoles	6.33 m
3rd place, bronze medalist(s)	Donna Thomas	North Texas Mean Green	6.27 m
4th	Alice Bennett	Florida State Seminoles	6.20 m
5th	Pamela Donald	Stanford Cardinal	6.17 m
6th	Ann Meacham	Eastern Michigan Eagles	6.16 m
7th	Gayle Brandon	Eastern Illinois Panthers	6.14 m
8th	Kathy Rankin	Georgia Bulldogs	6.07 m
9th	Vivian Riddick	Penn State Nittany Lions	5.94 m
10th	Sharon Moultrie	Texas Tech Red Raiders	5.93 m
11th	Becky Jo Kaiser	Illinois Fighting Illini	5.89 m
12th	Esther Otieno	UTEP Miners	5.88 m
13th	Elizabeth Miller	Oregon Ducks	5.88 m
14th	Halycon McKnight	Kansas Jayhawks	5.87 m
15th	Robin Taylor	Old Dominion Monarchs	5.77 m
16th	Tonya Brown	Florida State Seminoles	5.77 m
17th	Lisa Anne Staton	North Carolina Tar Heels	5.77 m
18th	Lorrie Thornton	Michigan Wolverines	5.71 m
19th	Rene Rochester	Texas Longhorns	5.63 m
20th	Sharrieffa Barksdale	Tennessee Volunteers	5.57 m
21st	Dawn Renee Mann	Indiana Hoosiers	5.53 m
22nd	Jeanette Williams	Indiana State Sycamores	5.37 m
23rd	BJ Eldridge	Wyoming Cowgirls	5.19 m

Shot put
Pl.	Name	Team	Mark
1st place, gold medalist(s)	Meg Ritchie	Arizona Wildcats	16.82 m
2nd place, silver medalist(s)	Marita Walton	Maryland Terrapins	16.56 m
3rd place, bronze medalist(s)	Cecil Hansen	Oklahoma Sooners	16.42 m
4th	Rosemary Hauch	Tennessee Volunteers	16.22 m
5th	Elaine Sobansky	Penn State Nittany Lions	16.08 m
6th	Ria Stalman	Arizona State Sun Devils	15.68 m
7th	Cindy Crapper	Kentucky Wildcats	15.55 m
8th	Sandy Burke	Northeastern Huskies	15.47 m
9th	Ramona Pagel	Long Beach State Beach	15.18 m
10th	Oneita Davis	St. John's Red Storm	14.98 m
11th	Lisa Ferry	Houston Cougars	14.96 m
12th	Carol Cady	Stanford Cardinal	14.89 m
13th	Annie McElroy	Long Beach State Beach	14.71 m
14th	Deborah Moore	Ohio State Buckeyes	14.28 m
15th	Sharon Mitnik	Temple Owls	14.20 m
16th	Nadine Cox	Ohio State Buckeyes	14.03 m
17th	Debra Pryor	Arizona State Sun Devils	14.01 m
18th	Karen Wood	Nebraska Cornhuskers	13.80 m
19th	Sharon Lotmore	Florida Gators	13.66 m
20th	Jo Beth Palmer	Texas Longhorns	13.61 m
21st	Janice Stucky	Kansas State Wildcats	13.48 m

Pentathlon
Pl.	Name	Team	Mark
1st place, gold medalist(s)	Patsy Walker	Houston Cougars	4215 pts
2nd place, silver medalist(s)	Susan Brownell	Virginia Cavaliers	4131 pts
3rd place, bronze medalist(s)	Juanita Alson	Maryland Terrapins	4060 pts
4th	Nancy Kindig	Nebraska Cornhuskers	4001 pts
5th	Myrtle Chester	Tennessee Volunteers	3942 pts
6th	Kim Hagger	Kansas State Wildcats	3781 pts
7th	Cathy Seybold	Nebraska Cornhuskers	3688 pts
8th	Vivian Estes Eschavarria	BYU Cougars	3463 pts
9th	Wendy Limbaugh	Utah State Aggies	1395 pts

== See also ==
- Association for Intercollegiate Athletics for Women championships § Indoor track and field
