= 1982 AIAW Indoor Track and Field Championships =

- Dates: March 12–13, 1982
- Host city: Cedar Falls, Iowa
- Venue: UNI-Dome
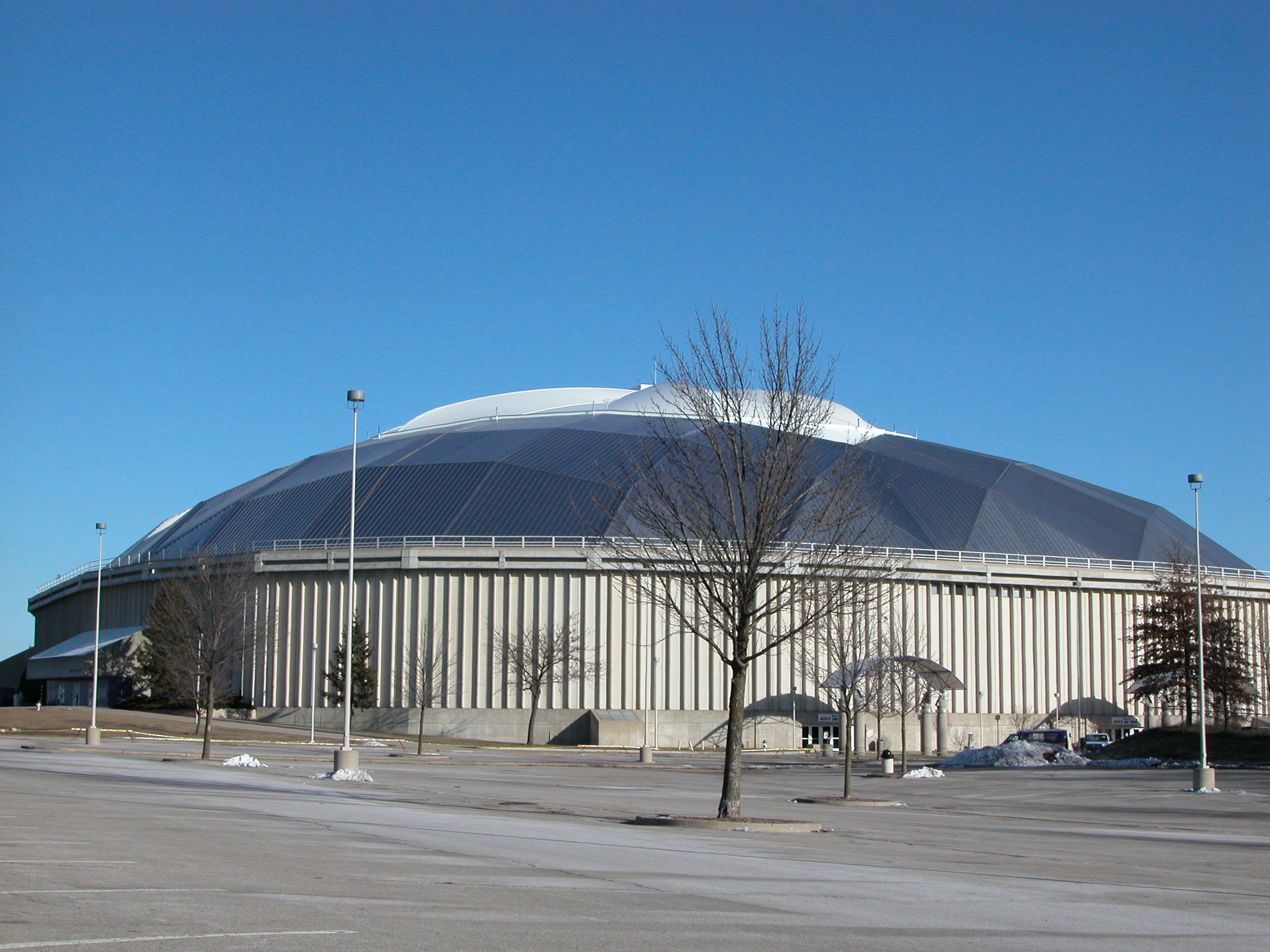

The 1982 AIAW Indoor Track And Field Championships were the third official Association for Intercollegiate Athletics for Women-sanctioned track meet to determine the individual and team national champions of women's collegiate indoor track and field events in the United States. They were contested March 12−13, 1982 in Cedar Falls, Iowa at the UNI-Dome and won by the Nebraska Cornhuskers track and field team.

Unlike other AIAW-sponsored sports, there were not separate Division I, II, and III championships for indoor track and field. It was the last indoor championships before the AIAW meet was replaced by the NCAA Division I Women's Indoor Track and Field Championships.

At the meeting, Merlene Ottey won three events for Nebraska to lead them to the team title. World records were set in the 300 yards by Ottey and the 600 yards by Delisa Walton-Floyd.

== Team standings ==
- Scoring: 10 points for a 1st-place finish, 8 points for 2nd, 6 points for 3rd, 4 points for 4th, 2 points for 5th, and 1 point for 6th. Top 10 teams shown.

| Rank | Team | Points |
|---|---|---|
| 1st place, gold medalist(s) | Nebraska Cornhuskers | 84 |
| 2nd place, silver medalist(s) | Tennessee Volunteers | 64 |
| 3rd place, bronze medalist(s) | Virginia Cavaliers | 57 |
| 4th | Florida State Seminoles | 35 |
| 5th | Texas Longhorns | 28 |
| 6th | Wisconsin Badgers | 27 |
| 7th | Oklahoma Sooners | 22 |
| 7th | UTEP Miners | 22 |
| 9th | Richmond Spiders | 16 |
| 10th | Penn State Nittany Lions | 15 |
| 10th | Iowa Hawkeyes | 15 |

== Results ==
- Only results of finals are shown

60 yards
| Pl. | Name | Team | Mark |
|---|---|---|---|
| 1st place, gold medalist(s) | Merlene Ottey | Nebraska Cornhuskers | 6.61 |
| 2nd place, silver medalist(s) | Janet Burke | Nebraska Cornhuskers | 6.76 |
| 3rd place, bronze medalist(s) | Alicia McQueen | Nebraska Cornhuskers | 6.86 |
| 4th | Sherri Funn | George Mason Patriots | 6.91 |
| 5th | Deborah James | Nebraska Cornhuskers | 6.92 |
| 6th | Felicia Moore | Oklahoma Sooners | 6.95 |
| 7th | Marita Payne | Florida State Seminoles | 6.96 |
| 8th | Tracy Armstead | Cortland Red Dragons | 7.02 |

300 yards
| Pl. | Name | Team | Mark |
|---|---|---|---|
| 1st place, gold medalist(s) | Merlene Ottey | Nebraska Cornhuskers | 32.63 WR |
| 2nd place, silver medalist(s) | Randy Givens | Florida State Seminoles | 34.49 |
| 3rd place, bronze medalist(s) | Janet Burke | Nebraska Cornhuskers | 34.62 |
| 4th | Marita Payne | Florida State Seminoles | 34.77 |
| 5th | Alicia McQueen | Nebraska Cornhuskers | 34.94 |
| 6th | Felicia Moore | Oklahoma Sooners | 35.01 |
| 7th | Benita Fitzgerald | Tennessee Volunteers | 35.30 |
| 8th | Sybil Perry | Purdue Boilermakers | 35.42 |

440 yards
| Pl. | Name | Team | Mark |
|---|---|---|---|
| 1st place, gold medalist(s) | Lori McCauley | Rutgers Scarlet Knights | 54.12 |
| 2nd place, silver medalist(s) | Edna Brown | Temple Owls | 54.65 |
| 3rd place, bronze medalist(s) | Charmaine Crooks | UTEP Miners | 54.82 |
| 4th | Lisa Garrett | Virginia Cavaliers | 54.96 |
| 5th | Cathy Rattray | Tennessee Volunteers | 55.01 |
| 6th | Angela Wright-Scott | Florida State Seminoles | 55.16 |
| 7th | Stephanie Bonner | Auburn Tigers | 55.73 |
| 8th | Donethy Jones | Ohio State Buckeyes | 55.78 |

600 yards
| Pl. | Name | Team | Mark |
|---|---|---|---|
| 1st place, gold medalist(s) | Delisa Walton | Tennessee Volunteers | 1:17.38 WR |
| 2nd place, silver medalist(s) | Robbin Coleman | Texas Longhorns | 1:18.62 |
| 3rd place, bronze medalist(s) | Rosalyn Dunlap | Missouri Tigers | 1:19.81 |
| 4th | Marcia Tate | Nebraska Cornhuskers | 1:20.54 |
| 5th | Ovrill Brown | Florida State Seminoles | 1:21.98 |
| 6th | Jennifer Whitfield | Villanova Wildcats | 1:22.68 |
| 7th | Veronica McIntosh | Villanova Wildcats | 1:26.15 |
| | Tammie Hart | Penn State Nittany Lions | DQ |

880 yards
| Pl. | Name | Team | Mark |
|---|---|---|---|
| 1st place, gold medalist(s) | Doriane McClive | Cornell Big Red | 2:05.34 |
| 2nd place, silver medalist(s) | Kay Stormo | Iowa Hawkeyes | 2:08.77 |
| 3rd place, bronze medalist(s) | Maureen Houghton | Oklahoma Sooners | 2:09.79 |
| 4th | Sheila Montgomery | Indiana Hoosiers | 2:10.89 |
| 5th | Jymette Bonnivier | Purdue Boilermakers | 2:11.10 |
| 6th | Terry Pioli | Penn State Nittany Lions | 2:12.30 |
| 7th | Patricia Bradley | Villanova Wildcats | 2:13.03 |
| | Delisa Walton | Tennessee Volunteers | DNS |

1000 yards
| Pl. | Name | Team | Mark |
|---|---|---|---|
| 1st place, gold medalist(s) | Joetta Clark | Tennessee Volunteers | 2:26.70 |
| 2nd place, silver medalist(s) | Josephine White | Richmond Spiders | 2:28.91 |
| 3rd place, bronze medalist(s) | Maryann Brunner | Wisconsin Badgers | 2:29.34 |
| 4th | Tara Arnold | Texas Longhorns | 2:30.13 |
| 5th | Tami Essington | Nebraska Cornhuskers | 2:30.32 |
| 6th | Suzanne Fredrick | Michigan Wolverines | 2:30.74 |
| 7th | Judith Croasdale | BYU Cougars | 2:31.67 |
| 8th | Margaret Coomber | Florida State Seminoles | 2:31.73 |
| 9th | Wren Schafer | Iowa State Cyclones | 2:32.3 |
| 10th | Carleen Thom | Colorado Buffaloes | 2:33.6 |

Mile run
| Pl. | Name | Team | Mark |
|---|---|---|---|
| 1st place, gold medalist(s) | Darlene Beckford | Harvard Crimson | 4:38.30 |
| 2nd place, silver medalist(s) | Jill Haworth | Virginia Cavaliers | 4:38.51 |
| 3rd place, bronze medalist(s) | Linda Portasik | Tennessee Volunteers | 4:42.30 |
| 4th | Patty Murnane | Penn State Nittany Lions | 4:43.33 |
| 5th | Jenny Stricker | Harvard Crimson | 4:44.32 |
| 6th | Marisa Schmitt | Virginia Cavaliers | 4:44.33 |
| 7th | Rose Thomson | Wisconsin Badgers | 4:49.46 |
| 8th | Mary Herlihy | Harvard Crimson | 4:49.62 |

2 miles (Note: Held as a two-section final)
| Pl. | Name | Team | Ht. | Mark |
|---|---|---|---|---|
| 1st place, gold medalist(s) | Bernadette Madigan | Kentucky Wildcats | 2 | 9:58.22 |
| 2nd place, silver medalist(s) | Kathy Bryant | Tennessee Volunteers | 2 | 9:59.00 |
| 3rd place, bronze medalist(s) | Aileen O'Connor | Virginia Cavaliers | 2 | 10:01.84 |
| 4th | Martha White | Virginia Cavaliers | 2 | 10:03.22 |
| 5th | Melanie Weaver | Michigan Wolverines | 2 | 10:08.33 |
| 6th | Nan Doak | Iowa Hawkeyes | 2 | 10:09.91 |
| 7th | Wendy Van Mierlo | Illinois State Redbirds | 2 | 10:14.62 |
| 8th | Carolyn Thrig | Penn State Nittany Lions | 2 | 10:16.2 |
| 9th | Paula Renzi | Penn State Nittany Lions | 1 | 10:18.23 |
| 10th | Marisa Schmitt | Virginia Cavaliers | 1 | 10:19.71 |
| 11th | Alanna McCarthy | Purdue Boilermakers | 1 | 10:19.75 |
| 12th | Kate Wiley | Harvard Crimson | 2 | 10:20.0 |
| 13th | Carey May | BYU Cougars | 1 | 10:26.03 |
| 14th | Marianne Dickerson | Illinois Fighting Illini | 1 | 10:27.44 |
| 15th | Lisa Welch | Virginia Cavaliers | 2 | 10:29.0 |
| 16th | Heather Carmichael | Penn State Nittany Lions | 2 | 10:30.0 |
| 17th | Janell Neeley | BYU Cougars | 1 | 10:32.72 |
| 18th | Lisa Larsen Rainsberger | Michigan Wolverines | 1 | 10:34.08 |
| 19th | Jenny Spangler | Iowa Hawkeyes | 1 | 10:34.84 |
| 20th | Kathy Boyle | Boston University Terriers | 2 | 10:35.0 |
| 21st | Cathy Branta | Wisconsin Badgers | 1 | 10:36.10 |
| 22nd | Sabina Horne | Georgia Bulldogs | 1 | 10:37.0 |
| 23rd | Carolyn Booth | Brown Bears | 1 | 10:38.0 |
| 24th | Becky Cotta | Purdue Boilermakers | 1 | 10:40.0 |
| 25th | Nancy Scardina | New Hampshire Wildcats | 2 | 10:42.0 |
| 26th | Kristin O'Connell | Rhode Island Rams | 1 | 10:44.0 |
| 27th | Pia Palladino | Georgetown Hoyas | 2 | 10:45.0 |

3 miles
| Pl. | Name | Team | Mark |
|---|---|---|---|
| 1st place, gold medalist(s) | Kellie Cathy | Oklahoma Sooners | 15:18.47 |
| 2nd place, silver medalist(s) | Kathy Bryant | Tennessee Volunteers | 15:18.83 |
| 3rd place, bronze medalist(s) | Martha White | Virginia Cavaliers | 15:25.25 |
| 4th | Lesley Welch | Virginia Cavaliers | 15:34.54 |
| 5th | Nan Doak | Iowa Hawkeyes | 15:34.55 |
| 6th | Patsy Sharples | Idaho Vandals | 15:48.65 |
| 7th | Jill Molen | Utah Utes | 15:49.85 |
| 8th | Alanna McCarthy | Purdue Boilermakers | 15:51.3 |
| 9th | Marianne Dickerson | Illinois Fighting Illini | 16:01.0 |
| 10th | Mary Jean Wright | Virginia Cavaliers | 16:03.0 |
| 11th | Beth Farmer | Florida Gators | 16:11.0 |
| 12th | Margaret Davis | Iowa State Cyclones | 16:17.0 |
| 13th | Kimberly Biro | East Tennessee State Buccaneers | 16:20.0 |
| 14th | Darien Andreu | Florida State Seminoles | 16:24.0 |
| 15th | Cheryl Konbol | Wisconsin Badgers | 16:29.0 |
| 16th | Maria Tilman | Arkansas Razorbacks | 16:30.0 |
| 17th | Jenny Spangler | Iowa Hawkeyes | 16:36.0 |
| 18th | Johanna Reneke | Indiana Hoosiers | 17:20.0 |

60 yards hurdles
| Pl. | Name | Team | Mark |
|---|---|---|---|
| 1st place, gold medalist(s) | Benita Fitzgerald | Tennessee Volunteers | 7.54 |
| 2nd place, silver medalist(s) | Kim Turner | UTEP Miners | 7.65 |
| 3rd place, bronze medalist(s) | Rhonda Blanford | Nebraska Cornhuskers | 7.70 |
| 4th | Kathy Borgwarth | Wisconsin Badgers | 7.77 |
| 5th | Clara Hairston | Auburn Tigers | 7.85 |
| 6th | Carolyn Faison | Florida State Seminoles | 7.98 |
| 7th | Tonja Brown | Florida State Seminoles | 7.99 |
| 8th | Tonya Lowe | Kentucky Wildcats | 8.05 |

4 × 220 yards relay (Note: Only two teams competed)
| Pl. | Name | Team | Mark |
|---|---|---|---|
| 1st place, gold medalist(s) | Merlene Ottey | Nebraska Cornhuskers | 1:37.70 |
| 1st place, gold medalist(s) | Jennie Gorham | Nebraska Cornhuskers | 1:37.70 |
| 1st place, gold medalist(s) | Rhonda Blanford | Nebraska Cornhuskers | 1:37.70 |
| 1st place, gold medalist(s) | Deborah James | Nebraska Cornhuskers | 1:37.70 |
| 2nd place, silver medalist(s) | Kim Parrish | Florida State Seminoles | 1:38.80 |
| 2nd place, silver medalist(s) | Marita Payne | Florida State Seminoles | 1:38.80 |
| 2nd place, silver medalist(s) | Alice Bennett | Florida State Seminoles | 1:38.80 |
| 2nd place, silver medalist(s) | Randy Givens | Florida State Seminoles | 1:38.80 |

4 × 440 yards relay
| Pl. | Name | Team | Mark |
|---|---|---|---|
| 1st place, gold medalist(s) | Donna Sherfield | Texas Longhorns | 3:44.06 |
| 1st place, gold medalist(s) | Florence Walker | Texas Longhorns | 3:44.06 |
| 1st place, gold medalist(s) | Susan Bean | Texas Longhorns | 3:44.06 |
| 1st place, gold medalist(s) | Robbin Coleman | Texas Longhorns | 3:44.06 |
| 2nd place, silver medalist(s) | Lisa Garrett | Virginia Cavaliers | 3:45.66 |
| 2nd place, silver medalist(s) | Kim Hatchett | Virginia Cavaliers | 3:45.66 |
| 2nd place, silver medalist(s) | Gail Bryant | Virginia Cavaliers | 3:45.66 |
| 2nd place, silver medalist(s) | Karen Hatchett | Virginia Cavaliers | 3:45.66 |
| 3rd place, bronze medalist(s) | Jennie Gorham | Nebraska Cornhuskers | 3:47.07 |
| 3rd place, bronze medalist(s) | Ruth Pugh | Nebraska Cornhuskers | 3:47.07 |
| 3rd place, bronze medalist(s) | Merlene Ottey | Nebraska Cornhuskers | 3:47.07 |
| 3rd place, bronze medalist(s) | Marcia Tate | Nebraska Cornhuskers | 3:47.07 |
| 4th | Kim Young | Indiana Hoosiers | 3:48.25 |
| 4th | Barbara Ennis | Indiana Hoosiers | 3:48.25 |
| 4th | Mary Watson | Indiana Hoosiers | 3:48.25 |
| 4th | Sheila Montgomery | Indiana Hoosiers | 3:48.25 |
| 5th | Kathy Tisdale | Rutgers Scarlet Knights | 3:48.71 |
| 5th | Andrea Patterson | Rutgers Scarlet Knights | 3:48.71 |
| 5th | Terry Dembek | Rutgers Scarlet Knights | 3:48.71 |
| 5th | Lori McCauley | Rutgers Scarlet Knights | 3:48.71 |
| 6th | Tonja Brown | Florida State Seminoles | 3:48.89 |
| 6th | Eunice Golden | Florida State Seminoles | 3:48.89 |
| 6th | Angela Wright-Scott | Florida State Seminoles | 3:48.89 |
| 6th | Ovrill Brown | Florida State Seminoles | 3:48.89 |
| 7th | Glenda Truesdale | Temple Owls | 3:50.28 |
| 7th | Pat Lee | Temple Owls | 3:50.28 |
| 7th | Edyizi Parkinson | Temple Owls | 3:50.28 |
| 7th | Edna Brown | Temple Owls | 3:50.28 |
| 8th | Felicia Moore | Oklahoma Sooners | 3:51.66 |
| 8th | Maureen Houghton | Oklahoma Sooners | 3:51.66 |
| 8th | Rene Nickles | Oklahoma Sooners | 3:51.66 |
| 8th | Annette Campbell | Oklahoma Sooners | 3:51.66 |

4 × 880 yards relay
| Pl. | Name | Team | Mark |
|---|---|---|---|
| 1st place, gold medalist(s) | Margaret Coomber | Florida State Seminoles | 8:47.26 |
| 1st place, gold medalist(s) | Carla Borovicka | Florida State Seminoles | 8:47.26 |
| 1st place, gold medalist(s) | Janette Wood | Florida State Seminoles | 8:47.26 |
| 1st place, gold medalist(s) | Ovrill Brown | Florida State Seminoles | 8:47.26 |
| 2nd place, silver medalist(s) | Sue Beischel | Wisconsin Badgers | 8:47.49 |
| 2nd place, silver medalist(s) | Rose Thomson | Wisconsin Badgers | 8:47.49 |
| 2nd place, silver medalist(s) | Maryann Brunner | Wisconsin Badgers | 8:47.49 |
| 2nd place, silver medalist(s) | Sue Spaltholz | Wisconsin Badgers | 8:47.49 |
| 3rd place, bronze medalist(s) | Sharon Neugebauer | Texas Longhorns | 8:50.39 |
| 3rd place, bronze medalist(s) | Robbin Coleman | Texas Longhorns | 8:50.39 |
| 3rd place, bronze medalist(s) | Florence Walker | Texas Longhorns | 8:50.39 |
| 3rd place, bronze medalist(s) | Tara Arnold | Texas Longhorns | 8:50.39 |
| 4th | Dawn Woodruff | Michigan Wolverines | 8:53.12 |
| 4th | Lisa Larsen Rainsberger | Michigan Wolverines | 8:53.12 |
| 4th | Melanie Weaver | Michigan Wolverines | 8:53.12 |
| 4th | Sue Fredrick | Michigan Wolverines | 8:53.12 |
| 5th | Ruth Pugh | Nebraska Cornhuskers | 8:54.74 |
| 5th | Jennie Gorham | Nebraska Cornhuskers | 8:54.74 |
| 5th | Sara Stricker | Nebraska Cornhuskers | 8:54.74 |
| 5th | Tami Essington | Nebraska Cornhuskers | 8:54.74 |
| 6th | Karen Vanwagenen | BYU Cougars | 9:13.65 |
| 6th | Karen Alexander | BYU Cougars | 9:13.65 |
| 6th | Aulikki Kononoff | BYU Cougars | 9:13.65 |
| 6th | Janell Nelley | BYU Cougars | 9:13.65 |

Distance medley relay
| Pl. | Name | Team | Mark |
|---|---|---|---|
| 1st place, gold medalist(s) | Linda Nicholson | Virginia Cavaliers | 11:21.92 |
| 1st place, gold medalist(s) | Karen Hatchett | Virginia Cavaliers | 11:21.92 |
| 1st place, gold medalist(s) | Lisa Welch | Virginia Cavaliers | 11:21.92 |
| 1st place, gold medalist(s) | Jill Haworth | Virginia Cavaliers | 11:21.92 |
| 2nd place, silver medalist(s) | Missy Mullett | Richmond Spiders | 11:29.98 |
| 2nd place, silver medalist(s) | Betsy Spilman | Richmond Spiders | 11:29.98 |
| 2nd place, silver medalist(s) | Patty Thomas | Richmond Spiders | 11:29.98 |
| 2nd place, silver medalist(s) | Jo White | Richmond Spiders | 11:29.98 |
| 3rd place, bronze medalist(s) | Lynn Biggs | Missouri Tigers | 11:34.05 |
| 3rd place, bronze medalist(s) | Ramona Riley | Missouri Tigers | 11:34.05 |
| 3rd place, bronze medalist(s) | Sabrina Dornhoefer | Missouri Tigers | 11:34.05 |
| 3rd place, bronze medalist(s) | Andrea Fischer | Missouri Tigers | 11:34.05 |
| 4th | Kay Stormo | Iowa Hawkeyes | 11:35.07 |
| 4th | Chris Davenport | Iowa Hawkeyes | 11:35.07 |
| 4th | Jenny Hayden | Iowa Hawkeyes | 11:35.07 |
| 4th | Nan Doak | Iowa Hawkeyes | 11:35.07 |
| 5th | Doreen Startare | Penn State Nittany Lions | 11:35.11 |
| 5th | Tammie Hart | Penn State Nittany Lions | 11:35.11 |
| 5th | Patty Murnane | Penn State Nittany Lions | 11:35.11 |
| 5th | Carolyn Thrig | Penn State Nittany Lions | 11:35.11 |
| 6th | Ellen Olson | Wisconsin Badgers | 11:35.24 |
| 6th | Mary Mulrooney | Wisconsin Badgers | 11:35.24 |
| 6th | Maryann Brunner | Wisconsin Badgers | 11:35.24 |
| 6th | Cathy Branta | Wisconsin Badgers | 11:35.24 |
| 7th | Wren Schafer | Iowa State Cyclones | 11:36.78 |
| 7th | Sumetia Wells | Iowa State Cyclones | 11:36.78 |
| 7th | Margaret Davis | Iowa State Cyclones | 11:36.78 |
| 7th | Catherine Hunter | Iowa State Cyclones | 11:36.78 |
| 8th | Jymette Bonnivier | Purdue Boilermakers | 11:39.16 |
| 8th | Patty Jongleux | Purdue Boilermakers | 11:39.16 |
| 8th | Nancy Sanford | Purdue Boilermakers | 11:39.16 |
| 8th | Andrea Marek | Purdue Boilermakers | 11:39.16 |

High jump
| Pl. | Name | Team | Mark |
|---|---|---|---|
| 1st place, gold medalist(s) | Gale Charmaine | Arizona Wildcats | 1.87 m |
| 2nd place, silver medalist(s) | Suzanne Lorentzon | UTEP Miners | 1.87 m |
| 3rd place, bronze medalist(s) | Maria Luísa Betioli | BYU Cougars | 1.84 m |
| 4th | Yolanda Gibson | Brooklyn Bulldogs | 1.81 m |
| 5th | Jonna Bullard | Michigan Wolverines | 1.81 m |
| 6th | Peggy Stewart | Villanova Wildcats | 1.81 m |
| 7th | Cheryl Essman | Wisconsin Badgers | 1.78 m |
| 8th | Sharon Burrill | Nebraska Cornhuskers | 1.78 m |

Long jump
| Pl. | Name | Team | Mark |
|---|---|---|---|
| 1st place, gold medalist(s) | Donna Thomas | North Texas Mean Green | 6.31 m |
| 2nd place, silver medalist(s) | Patricia Johnson | Wisconsin Badgers | 6.25 m |
| 3rd place, bronze medalist(s) | Becky Jo Kaiser | Illinois Fighting Illini | 6.15 m |
| 4th | Annette Tannander | Colorado Buffaloes | 6.14 m |
| 5th | Vivian Riddick | Penn State Nittany Lions | 6.10 m |
| 6th | Gayle Brandon | Eastern Illinois Panthers | 6.06 m |
| 7th | Lisa Staton | North Carolina Tar Heels | 5.96 m |
| 8th | Kathy Rankins | Georgia Bulldogs | 5.90 m |

Shot put
| Pl. | Name | Team | Mark |
|---|---|---|---|
| 1st place, gold medalist(s) | Rosemarie Blauch | Tennessee Volunteers | 16.76 m |
| 2nd place, silver medalist(s) | Marita Walton | Maryland Terrapins | 16.75 m |
| 3rd place, bronze medalist(s) | Elaine Sobansky | Penn State Nittany Lions | 16.57 m |
| 4th | Cecil Hansen | Oklahoma Sooners | 15.99 m |
| 5th | Sandra Burke | Northeastern Huskies | 15.95 m |
| 6th | Cindy Crapper | Kentucky Wildcats | 15.77 m |
| 7th | Julie Jones | BYU Cougars | 15.37 m |
| 8th | Annette Bohach | Indiana Hoosiers | 15.35 m |

Pentathlon
| Pl. | Name | Team | Mark |
|---|---|---|---|
| 1st place, gold medalist(s) | Julie White | Boston University Terriers | 4268 pts |
| 2nd place, silver medalist(s) | Nancy Kindig | Nebraska Cornhuskers | 4217 pts |
| 3rd place, bronze medalist(s) | Susan Brownell | Virginia Cavaliers | 4153 pts |
| 4th | Juanita Alson | Maryland Terrapins | 3953 pts |
| 5th | Marjin Goedken | Nebraska Cornhuskers | 3913 pts |
| 6th | Linda Spenst | Missouri Tigers | 3803 pts |
| 7th | Lillian Nickles | Oklahoma Sooners | 3782 pts |
| 8th | Myrtle Chester | Tennessee Volunteers | 3767 pts |
| 9th | Carla Battaglia | Indiana Hoosiers | 3586 pts |
| 10th | Nora Aravjo | Auburn Tigers | 3028 pts |

== See also ==
- Association for Intercollegiate Athletics for Women championships § Indoor track and field
- 1982 NCAA Division I Indoor Track and Field Championships
