= Virginia Cavaliers track and field =

College track and field team

- University: University of Virginia
- Head coach: Vin Lananna
- Conference: ACC
- Location: Charlottesville, Virginia
- Outdoor track: Lannigan Field
- Nickname: Cavaliers
- Colors: Orange and blue

NCAA Indoor National Championships
- 1981 (AIAW)

The Virginia Cavaliers track and field team is the track and field program that represents University of Virginia. The Cavaliers compete in NCAA Division I as a member of the Atlantic Coast Conference. The team is based in Charlottesville, Virginia at the Lannigan Field.

The program is coached by Vin Lananna. The track and field program officially encompasses four teams because the NCAA considers men's and women's indoor track and field and outdoor track and field as separate sports.

The program won its first and only team national title at the 1981 AIAW Indoor Track and Field Championships.

== Postseason ==
=== AIAW ===
The Cavaliers have had 10 AIAW individual All-Americans finishing in the top six at the AIAW indoor or outdoor championships.

AIAW All-Americans
Championships	Name	Event	Place
1978 Outdoor	Margaret Groos	1500 meters	4th
1979 Outdoor	Margaret Groos	1500 meters	3rd
1980 Indoor	Unknown	Distance medley relay	3rd
1980 Indoor	Unknown	Distance medley relay	3rd
1980 Indoor	Unknown	Distance medley relay	3rd
1980 Indoor	Unknown	Distance medley relay	3rd
1980 Indoor	Susan Brownell	Pentathlon	2nd
1980 Outdoor	Margaret Groos	5000 meters	2nd
1980 Outdoor	Vivian Scruggs	400 meters hurdles	6th
1980 Outdoor	Linda Nicholson	4 × 880 yards relay	5th
1980 Outdoor	Margaret Groos	4 × 880 yards relay	5th
1980 Outdoor	Jill Haworth	4 × 880 yards relay	5th
1980 Outdoor	Vivian Scruggs	4 × 880 yards relay	5th
1980 Outdoor	Susan Brownell	Pentathlon	4th
1981 Indoor	Lisa Garrett	400 meters	2nd
1981 Indoor	Jill Haworth	1500 meters	1st
1981 Indoor	Aileen O'Connor	3000 meters	5th
1981 Indoor	Aileen O'Connor	5000 meters	1st
1981 Indoor	Vivian Scruggs	4 × 880 yards relay	5th
1981 Indoor	Linda Nicholson	4 × 880 yards relay	5th
1981 Indoor	Marisa Schmitt	4 × 880 yards relay	5th
1981 Indoor	Jill Haworth	4 × 880 yards relay	5th
1981 Indoor	Vivian Scruggs	Distance medley relay	2nd
1981 Indoor	Brenda Brown	Distance medley relay	2nd
1981 Indoor	Linda Nicholson	Distance medley relay	2nd
1981 Indoor	Jill Haworth	Distance medley relay	2nd
1981 Indoor	Susan Brownell	Pentathlon	2nd
1981 Outdoor	Aileen O'Connor	10,000 meters	1st
1981 Outdoor	Vivian Scruggs	400 meters hurdles	3rd
1981 Outdoor	Linda Nicholson	4 × 800 meters relay	4th
1981 Outdoor	Vivan Scruggs	4 × 800 meters relay	4th
1981 Outdoor	Mary Waller	4 × 800 meters relay	4th
1981 Outdoor	Jill Haworth	4 × 800 meters relay	4th
1981 Outdoor	Ann Bair	High jump	2nd
1981 Outdoor	Susan Brownell	Heptathlon	6th
1982 Indoor	Lisa Garrett	440 yards	4th
1982 Indoor	Jill Haworth	Mile run	2nd
1982 Indoor	Marisa Schmitt	Mile run	6th
1982 Indoor	Aileen O'Connor	2 miles	3rd
1982 Indoor	Martha White	2 miles	4th
1982 Indoor	Martha White	3 miles	3rd
1982 Indoor	Lesley Welch	3 miles	4th
1982 Indoor	Lesley Welch	3 miles	4th
1982 Indoor	Lisa Garrett	4 × 440 yards relay	2nd
1982 Indoor	Kim Hatchett	4 × 440 yards relay	2nd
1982 Indoor	Gail Bryant	4 × 440 yards relay	2nd
1982 Indoor	Karen Hatchett	4 × 440 yards relay	2nd
1982 Indoor	Linda Nicholson	Distance medley relay	1st
1982 Indoor	Karen Hatchett	Distance medley relay	1st
1982 Indoor	Lisa Welch	Distance medley relay	1st
1982 Indoor	Jill Haworth	Distance medley relay	1st
1982 Indoor	Susan Brownell	Pentathlon	3rd

=== NCAA ===
As of 2024, a total of 40 men and 41 women have achieved individual first-team All-American status at the Division I men's outdoor, women's outdoor, men's indoor, or women's indoor national championships (using the modern criteria of top-8 placing regardless of athlete nationality).

First team NCAA All-Americans
Team	Championships	Name	Event	Place	Ref.
Men's	1940 Outdoor	Frank Fuller	110 meters hurdles	4th	
Men's	1943 Outdoor	Thomas Todd	110 meters hurdles	6th	
Men's	1968 Indoor	Mike Harvey	Long jump	5th	
Men's	1972 Outdoor	Keith Witherspoon	Triple jump	5th	
Men's	1975 Outdoor	Keith Witherspoon	Triple jump	8th	
Men's	1976 Indoor	Keith Witherspoon	Triple jump	2nd	
Men's	1979 Indoor	Greg Canty	1000 meters	2nd	
Men's	1979 Outdoor	Karl Williams	400 meters hurdles	6th	
Men's	1981 Indoor	Charles Brown	Distance medley relay	2nd	
Men's	1981 Indoor	David Revelle	Distance medley relay	2nd	
Men's	1981 Indoor	Theo Hodge	Distance medley relay	2nd	
Men's	1981 Indoor	Vince Draddy	Distance medley relay	2nd	
Men's	1981 Outdoor	Mike Cotton	10,000 meters	6th	
Men's	1981 Outdoor	Willy Pirtle	Decathlon	6th	
Men's	1982 Outdoor	Ray Brown	800 meters	3rd	
Women's	1982 Outdoor	Jill Haworth	1500 meters	3rd	
Women's	1982 Outdoor	Lisa Welch	3000 meters	6th	
Women's	1982 Outdoor	Aileen O'Connor	10,000 meters	6th	
Women's	1982 Outdoor	Susan Brownell	Heptathlon	5th	
Women's	1983 Indoor	Lisa Garrett	400 meters	4th	
Women's	1983 Indoor	Jeannette Kelly	800 meters	5th	
Women's	1983 Indoor	Jill Haworth	Mile run	2nd	
Women's	1983 Indoor	Ann Bair	High jump	4th	
Men's	1983 Outdoor	John Hinton	1500 meters	3rd	
Women's	1983 Outdoor	Kim Kelly	800 meters	8th	
Women's	1983 Outdoor	Jill Haworth	1500 meters	4th	
Women's	1983 Outdoor	Martha White	5000 meters	7th	
Women's	1983 Outdoor	Martha White	10,000 meters	8th	
Women's	1983 Outdoor	Ann Bair	High jump	5th	
Men's	1984 Indoor	Ray Brown	1000 meters	4th	
Women's	1984 Indoor	Gail Bryant	4 × 800 meters relay	4th	
Women's	1984 Indoor	Veronica Haber	4 × 800 meters relay	4th	
Women's	1984 Indoor	Michelle Rowan	4 × 800 meters relay	4th	
Women's	1984 Indoor	Kim Kelly	4 × 800 meters relay	4th	
Men's	1984 Outdoor	Ray Brown	800 meters	7th	
Men's	1985 Indoor	John Hinton	1000 meters	3rd	
Women's	1985 Indoor	Gail Bryant	4 × 800 meters relay	3rd	
Women's	1985 Indoor	Sandy Schuler	4 × 800 meters relay	3rd	
Women's	1985 Indoor	Phyllis Buber	4 × 800 meters relay	3rd	
Women's	1985 Indoor	Kim Kelly	4 × 800 meters relay	3rd	
Men's	1985 Outdoor	Jim Hays	5000 meters	7th	
Women's	1985 Outdoor	Gail Bryant	800 meters	8th	
Women's	1986 Indoor	Phyllis Buber	4 × 800 meters relay	3rd	
Women's	1986 Indoor	Shelly McBride	4 × 800 meters relay	3rd	
Women's	1986 Indoor	Michelle Rowen	4 × 800 meters relay	3rd	
Women's	1986 Indoor	Sandy Schuler	4 × 800 meters relay	3rd	
Women's	1986 Outdoor	Beth Sheehan	Heptathlon	8th	
Men's	1987 Indoor	Kris Herdt	3000 meters	8th	
Women's	1987 Indoor	Sonja Fridy	500 meters	5th	
Women's	1987 Indoor	Michelle Rowan	Mile run	2nd	
Women's	1987 Indoor	Sonja Fridy	Long jump	3rd	
Women's	1987 Outdoor	Sonja Fridy	400 meters	4th	
Women's	1987 Outdoor	Julia Solo	Javelin throw	7th	
Men's	1988 Indoor	Paul Ereng	800 meters	6th	
Men's	1988 Outdoor	Paul Ereng	800 meters	1st	
Women's	1988 Outdoor	Patty Matava	5000 meters	7th	
Women's	1988 Outdoor	Julia Solo	Javelin throw	8th	
Men's	1989 Indoor	Paul Ereng	800 meters	1st	
Men's	1989 Indoor	Ben Kurgat	800 meters	7th	
Women's	1989 Indoor	Dana Boone	Triple jump	4th	
Men's	1989 Outdoor	Paul Ereng	800 meters	1st	
Women's	1989 Outdoor	Julia Solo	Javelin throw	2nd	
Women's	1990 Outdoor	Dana Boone	Long jump	2nd	
Men's	1991 Indoor	Ben Kurgat	800 meters	3rd	
Women's	1991 Outdoor	Dana Boone	Long jump	5th	
Women's	1991 Outdoor	Dana Boone	Triple jump	8th	
Women's	1992 Indoor	Claire Forbes	3000 meters	6th	
Men's	1992 Outdoor	Steve Dunphy	Decathlon	5th	
Women's	1992 Outdoor	Claire Forbes	3000 meters	4th	
Women's	1993 Indoor	Sherry Gould	High jump	6th	
Women's	1993 Outdoor	Sherry Gould	High jump	5th	
Women's	1994 Indoor	Sherry Gould	High jump	2nd	
Men's	1994 Outdoor	Rob Cook	3000 meters steeplechase	8th	
Women's	1994 Outdoor	Lara Drauglis	1500 meters	8th	
Women's	1994 Outdoor	Rebecca Grube	Heptathlon	8th	
Women's	1995 Indoor	Rebecca Grube	Long jump	6th	
Women's	1997 Outdoor	Angela Lee	400 meters hurdles	6th	
Men's	2000 Outdoor	Brian Kollar	Javelin throw	2nd	
Men's	2001 Outdoor	Brian Kollar	Javelin throw	6th	
Men's	2001 Outdoor	John Welch	Javelin throw	7th	
Women's	2001 Outdoor	Inge Jorgensen	Javelin throw	4th	
Women's	2002 Indoor	Kiamesha Otey	Long jump	5th	
Men's	2002 Outdoor	John Welch	Javelin throw	7th	
Women's	2003 Outdoor	Dawn Cleary	3000 meters steeplechase	6th	
Women's	2004 Outdoor	Inge Jorgensen	Javelin throw	8th	
Women's	2005 Outdoor	Inge Jorgensen	Javelin throw	3rd	
Women's	2006 Indoor	Tomika Ferguson	Triple jump	6th	
Women's	2006 Outdoor	Erin Crawford	400 meters hurdles	5th	
Women's	2006 Outdoor	Billie-Jo Grant	Discus throw	6th	
Men's	2007 Indoor	Alex Tatu	Distance medley relay	7th	
Men's	2007 Indoor	Brian Lee	Distance medley relay	7th	
Men's	2007 Indoor	Jordan Orr	Distance medley relay	7th	
Men's	2007 Indoor	Kevin McHale	Distance medley relay	7th	
Women's	2007 Indoor	Tomika Ferguson	Triple jump	8th	
Men's	2007 Outdoor	Jan Forster	3000 meters steeplechase	6th	
Men's	2007 Outdoor	Yemi Ayeni	Discus throw	7th	
Men's	2008 Outdoor	Yemi Ayeni	Discus throw	2nd	
Women's	2008 Outdoor	Billie-Jo Grant	Discus throw	8th	
Men's	2009 Indoor	Sintayehu Taye	Distance medley relay	6th	
Men's	2009 Indoor	Meikle Paschal	Distance medley relay	6th	
Men's	2009 Indoor	Lance Roller	Distance medley relay	6th	
Men's	2009 Indoor	Andrew Jesien	Distance medley relay	6th	
Men's	2009 Outdoor	Yemi Ayeni	Discus throw	4th	
Women's	2009 Outdoor	Caitlin Kelly	Discus throw	4th	
Women's	2009 Outdoor	Billie-Jo Grant	Discus throw	6th	
Women's	2009 Outdoor	Meghan Briggs	Javelin throw	8th	
Men's	2010 Indoor	Robby Andrews	800 meters	1st	
Men's	2010 Outdoor	Robby Andrews	800 meters	2nd	
Men's	2010 Outdoor	Lance Roller	800 meters	6th	
Women's	2011 Indoor	Morgane Gay	Distance medley relay	3rd	
Women's	2011 Indoor	Ayla Smith	Distance medley relay	3rd	
Women's	2011 Indoor	Lyndsay Harper	Distance medley relay	3rd	
Women's	2011 Indoor	Stephanie Garcia	Distance medley relay	3rd	
Men's	2011 Outdoor	Robby Andrews	800 meters	1st	
Women's	2011 Outdoor	Morgane Gay	1500 meters	7th	
Women's	2011 Outdoor	Stephanie Garcia	3000 meters steeplechase	2nd	
Men's	2012 Indoor	Marcus Robinson	Triple jump	5th	
Women's	2012 Indoor	Morgane Gay	Mile run	5th	
Men's	2012 Outdoor	Marcus Robinson	Triple jump	6th	
Men's	2014 Outdoor	Ryan Satchell	Triple jump	7th	
Men's	2014 Outdoor	Filip Mihaljevic	Shot put	7th	
Men's	2014 Outdoor	Filip Mihaljevic	Discus throw	8th	
Women's	2014 Outdoor	Whitney Rose	Triple jump	7th	
Men's	2015 Indoor	Henry Wynne	Distance medley relay	6th	
Men's	2015 Indoor	Payton Hazzard	Distance medley relay	6th	
Men's	2015 Indoor	Nathan Kiley	Distance medley relay	6th	
Men's	2015 Indoor	Mike Marsella	Distance medley relay	6th	
Men's	2015 Indoor	Jordan Young	Weight throw	4th	
Men's	2015 Outdoor	Filip Mihaljevic	Discus throw	3rd	
Men's	2015 Outdoor	Jordan Young	Discus throw	6th	
Men's	2015 Outdoor	Jordan Young	Hammer throw	7th	
Men's	2016 Indoor	Henry Wynne	Mile run	1st	
Men's	2016 Indoor	Filip Mihaljevic	Shot put	2nd	
Men's	2016 Outdoor	Henry Wynne	1500 meters	3rd	
Men's	2016 Outdoor	Filip Mihaljevic	Shot put	1st	
Men's	2016 Outdoor	Filip Mihaljevic	Discus throw	5th	
Men's	2017 Indoor	Oghenakpobo Efekoro	Shot put	3rd	
Men's	2017 Indoor	Jordan Young	Weight throw	3rd	
Men's	2017 Outdoor	Filip Mihaljevic	Shot put	1st	
Men's	2017 Outdoor	Oghenakpobo Efekoro	Shot put	4th	
Men's	2017 Outdoor	Filip Mihaljevic	Discus throw	1st	
Men's	2017 Outdoor	Jordan Young	Discus throw	3rd	
Men's	2017 Outdoor	Hilmar Örn Jonsson	Hammer throw	4th	
Men's	2018 Outdoor	Oghenakpobo Efekoro	Shot put	6th	
Women's	2018 Outdoor	Bridget Williams	Pole vault	4th	
Men's	2019 Indoor	Jordan Scott	Triple jump	1st	
Women's	2019 Indoor	Bridget Williams	Pole vault	5th	
Men's	2019 Outdoor	Jordan Scott	Triple jump	2nd	
Men's	2019 Outdoor	Hilmar Örn Jonsson	Hammer throw	3rd	
Men's	2019 Outdoor	Ethan Dabbs	Javelin throw	7th	
Women's	2019 Outdoor	Bridget Williams	Pole vault	4th	
Women's	2019 Outdoor	Kelly McKee	Triple jump	5th	
Men's	2021 Indoor	Owyane Owens	Triple jump	6th	
Women's	2021 Indoor	Halle Hazzard	60 meters	8th	
Men's	2021 Outdoor	Derek Johnson	3000 meters steeplechase	7th	
Men's	2021 Outdoor	Claudio Romero	Discus throw	3rd	
Men's	2021 Outdoor	Jacob Lemmon	Discus throw	5th	
Women's	2021 Outdoor	Andrenette Knight	400 meters hurdles	3rd	
Women's	2021 Outdoor	Michaela Meyer	800 meters	1st	
Men's	2022 Indoor	Owyane Owens	Triple jump	8th	
Women's	2022 Indoor	Mia Barnett	Distance medley relay	7th	
Women's	2022 Indoor	Jada Seaman	Distance medley relay	7th	
Women's	2022 Indoor	Alahna Sabbakhan	Distance medley relay	7th	
Women's	2022 Indoor	Margot Appleton	Distance medley relay	7th	
Men's	2022 Outdoor	Claudio Romero	Discus throw	1st	
Men's	2022 Outdoor	Ethan Dabbs	Javelin throw	2nd	
Women's	2022 Outdoor	Maria Deaviz	Shot put	4th	
Men's	2023 Indoor	Conor Murphy	Mile run	6th	
Men's	2023 Indoor	Owyane Owens	Triple jump	3rd	
Women's	2023 Indoor	Margot Appleton	Mile run	4th	
Men's	2023 Outdoor	Conor Murphy	800 meters	5th	
Men's	2023 Outdoor	Nathan Mountain	3000 meters steeplechase	4th	
Men's	2023 Outdoor	Derek Johnson	3000 meters steeplechase	8th	
Men's	2023 Outdoor	Owyane Owens	Triple jump	6th	
Men's	2023 Outdoor	Ethan Dabbs	Javelin throw	2nd	
Women's	2023 Outdoor	Margot Appleton	1500 meters	3rd	
Women's	2023 Outdoor	Ashley Anumba	Discus throw	2nd	
Men's	2024 Indoor	Wes Porter	Distance medley relay	3rd	
Men's	2024 Indoor	Alex Sherman	Distance medley relay	3rd	
Men's	2024 Indoor	Alex Leath	Distance medley relay	3rd	
Men's	2024 Indoor	Yasin Sado	Distance medley relay	3rd	
Women's	2024 Indoor	Margot Appleton	Mile run	5th	
Men's	2024 Outdoor	Shane Cohen	800 meters	1st	
Men's	2024 Outdoor	Wes Porter	1500 meters	6th	
Men's	2024 Outdoor	Nathan Mountain	3000 meters steeplechase	2nd	
Men's	2024 Outdoor	Yasin Sado	3000 meters steeplechase	7th	
Men's	2024 Outdoor	Jacob Lemmon	Discus throw	6th	
Women's	2024 Outdoor	Margot Appleton	5000 meters	4th	

== See also ==
- Category:Virginia Cavaliers men's track and field athletes (18)
- Category:Virginia Cavaliers women's track and field athletes (11)
