= Patricia Bradley =

Patricia Bradley may refer to

- Patricia Bradley (athlete), see 1982 AIAW Indoor Track and Field Championships
- Pat Bradley (golfer), American golfer
