= Overill Dwyer-Brown =

Jamaican hurdler

Personal information
- Nationality: Jamaican
- Born: 4 January 1961 (age 65)

Sport
- Sport: Track and field
- Event: 400 metres hurdles

Overill Dwyer-Brown (born 4 January 1961) is a Jamaican hurdler. She competed in the women's 400 metres hurdles at the 1984 Summer Olympics.

Dwyer-Brown competed for the Florida State Seminoles track and field team, finishing 5th in the 600 yards at the 1982 AIAW Indoor Track and Field Championships.
