= James Earl Coleman =

American attorney (born 1946)

- Born: James Earl Coleman Jr. December 1, 1946 (age 79); Charlotte, North Carolina, U.S.
- Education: A.B., Harvard University; JD, Columbia Law School
- Occupations: Lawyer, law professor
- Spouse: Doriane Lambelet Coleman
- Children: 3

James Earl Coleman Jr. (born December 1, 1946) is an American attorney. He currently serves as the John S. Bradway Professor of Law and Director of the Center for Criminal Justice and Professional Responsibility at the Duke University School of Law. He was the primary member of the last defense team of serial killer Ted Bundy.

In 2006 he was appointed chair of a review committee regarding the 2006 Duke University lacrosse case. He has appeared on 60 Minutes, The Early Show, and other national broadcasts.

Coleman teaches Law at the Duke University School of Law, where he is also co-director of the Duke Law Wrongful Convictions Clinic and faculty advisor of the Innocence Project. In 2015 Coleman was honored with the Raeder-Taslitz Award from the American Bar Association’s Criminal Justice Section. In 2022, Coleman was named the 2022 Lemkin Rule of Law Guardian by the Bolch Judicial Institute at Duke Law School.

== Education and early career ==
Coleman was born in Charlotte, North Carolina in 1946. After graduating from a local public school in 1965, he attended a post-graduate year at Phillips Exeter Academy. He went on to attend Harvard University and Columbia Law School. Coleman clerked for the United States District Court for the Eastern District of Michigan.

After a year of private practice in New York, Coleman spent the next 15 years at the Washington, D.C. law firm of Wilmer Cutler and Pickering, the last 12 as a partner. Coleman also served as chief counsel for the U.S. House Committee on Standards of Official Conduct (Ethics Committee), and as deputy general counsel for the U.S. Department of Education.

== Bundy litigation ==
In 1986, Coleman and his associate, Polly Nelson, joined the defense team of serial killer Ted Bundy. They were able to secure three stays before Bundy was finally executed on January 24, 1989. Coleman was featured in the Netflix series Conversations with a Killer: The Ted Bundy Tapes and the Amazon Prime Video series Ted Bundy: Falling for a Killer.

== Duke lacrosse ==
In 2006, Duke University president Richard H. Brodhead appointed Coleman to chair one of five investigative committees formed in the wake of the Duke lacrosse case. The ad-hoc lacrosse review committee assessed the university's lacrosse team's culture, amid rape allegations, to determine whether the team's actions formed a pattern. Coleman stated that they would examine the team's conduct during the previous five years, across a three week period, before submitting a report. The Coleman report surmised that the players who had been charged "treated Duke staffers with respect... and had no record of sexist, racist, or other forms of anti-social behavior."

In interviews with 60 Minutes and CBS, and in an article he wrote for the Huffington Post, Coleman voiced his concerns about the justice system on display throughout the Duke lacrosse case.

Coleman said that former district attorney Mike Nifong had committed serious prosecutorial misconduct, and if defendants were convicted, there "would be a basis to have the conviction overturned based on his conduct."

== Wrongful convictions ==
As a professor at the Duke University School of Law, Coleman is the co-director of the Wrongful Convictions Clinic and the faculty advisor for the Innocence Project. Both programs work to exonerate wrongfully convicted inmates primarily in North Carolina. In recent years Coleman and the Wrongful Convictions Clinic have succeeded in exonerating former inmates including LaMonte Armstrong and Shawn Massey.
