= Joan Hansen =

American long-distance runner

Personal information
- Born: July 18, 1958 (age 67) Kansas City, Missouri, United States

Sport
- Sport: Track and field

Joan Elizabeth Hansen (born July 18, 1958) is a retired long-distance runner from the United States, who represented her native country in the women's 3,000 metres at the 1984 Summer Olympics in Los Angeles, California, finishing in eighth place. Her twin, Joy Hansen Leutner, is a triathlete.

Hansen competed in the AIAW for the Arizona Wildcats track and field team, finishing runner-up in the 1500 m at the 1981 AIAW Indoor Track and Field Championships.
