= Margot Appleton =

American middle-distance runner (born 2002)

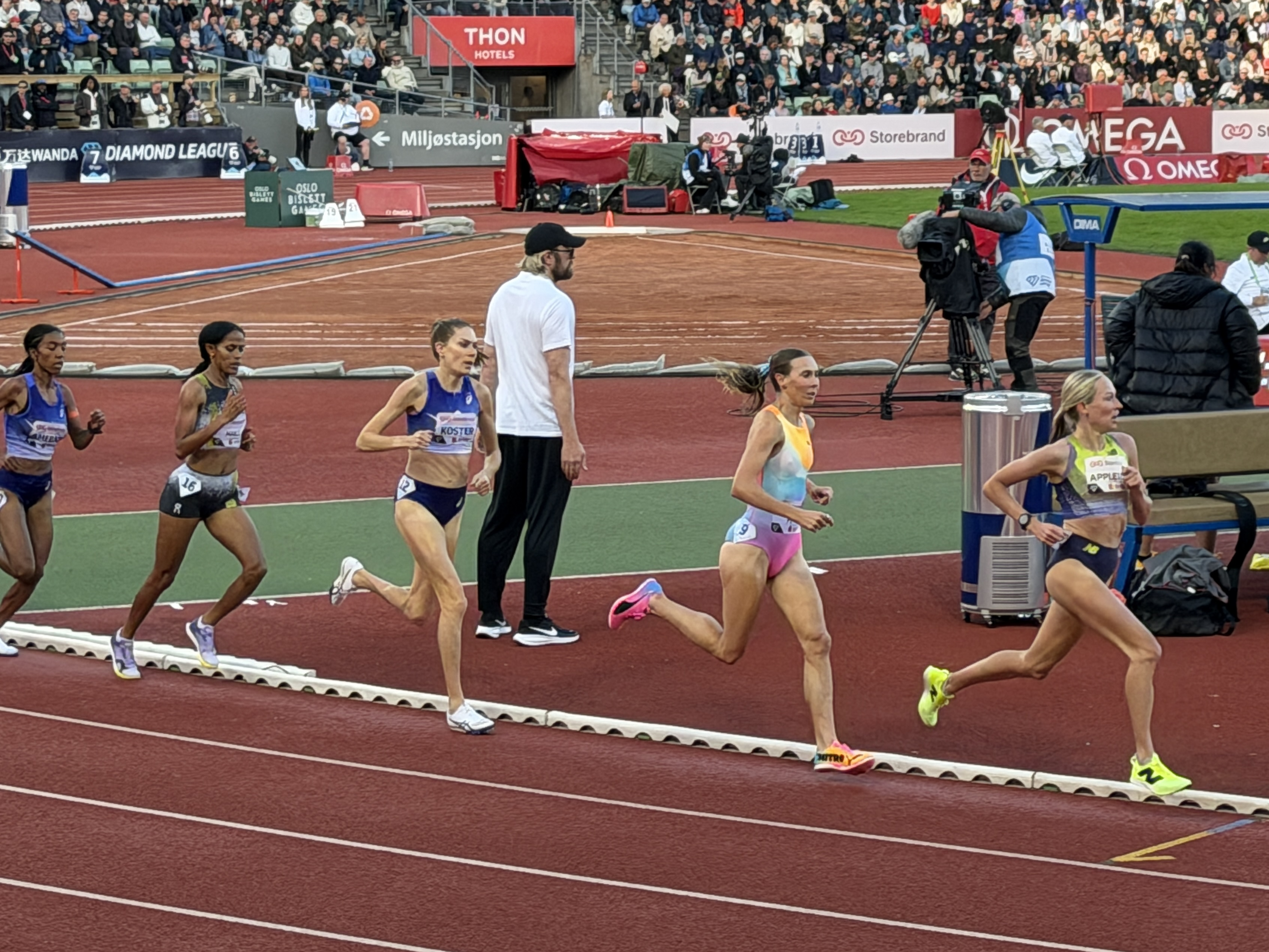
- Appleton at the 2026 Bislett Games

Personal information
- Born: 30 September 2002 (age 23)

Sport
- Sport: Athletics
- Events: Middle-distance running, Cross country running

Achievements and titles
- Personal bests: 800m: 2:06.27 (Virginia Beach, 2025); 1500m: 4:04.72 (Eugene, 2025); Mile: 4:22.94 (New York, 2026); 3000m: 8:39.79 (Boston, 2026); 5000m: 15:03.19 (Boston, 2026)

Margot Appleton (born 30 September 2002) is an American middle-distance runner.

== Early life ==
From Mattapoisett, Massachusetts, she attended Portsmouth Abbey School in Rhode Island. Alongside running, she was also a competitive swimmer before focusing fully on athletics. In 2018, she won the cross country at the Eastern Independent League Championship and was named EIL MVP. She also won the title at the Division 3 New England Championship.

== Career ==
Appleton ran 4:09.30 to finish third for the University of Virginia in the 1500 metres at the 2023 NCAA Outdoor Championships in Austin, Texas.

She stepped up in distances and placed fourth over 5000 metres at the 2024 NCAA Championships final in Eugene, Oregon running 15:24.24 in a race won by Parker Valby. In December 2024, she ran 8:46.23 for the 3000 metres, a personal best by eleven seconds, whilst running indoors in Boston, Massachusetts.

She ran a personal best 4:05.68 for the 1500 metres at the Raleigh Relays in North Carolina in March 2025, finishing ahead of Kimberley May. The time moved her to fourth on the NCAA all-time list and broke the meet record by over three seconds, previously held by Shannon Flockhart. In May 2025, she won the Atlantic Coast Conference 1500m title for Virginia. The following month, she was runner-up to Sophie O'Sullivan over 1500 metres at the 2025 NCAA outdoor Championships.

She ran a personal best 4:04.72 for the 1500 metres in the heats at the 2025 USA Outdoor Track and Field Championships prior to finishing tenth in the final.

Appleton placed third over 3000 metres at the 2026 USA Indoor Track and Field Championships, finishing in 8:41.41. She competed in the 3000 metres at the 2026 World Athletics Indoor Championships in Toruń, Poland, in March 2026. On 4 July, Appleton placed fifth over two miles at the 2026 Prefontaine Classic.

== Personal life ==
Her older brother, David Appleton, is also a competitive runner.

=== International competitions ===
Representing the United States
Year	Competition	Venue	Position	Event	Time
2026	World Athletics Indoor Championships	Toruń, Poland	14th	3000m	9:12.57

=== National championships ===
Year	Competition	Venue	Position	Event	Time
2024	Olympic Trials	Eugene, Oregon	32nd	1500m	4:17.44
2025	USATF Outdoor Championships	Eugene, Oregon	10th	1500m	4:09.40
2025	USATF Cross Country Championships	Portland, Oregon	15th	10 km	35:15
2026	USATF Indoor Championships	Staten Island, New York	3rd	3000m	8:41.41
2026	USATF Indoor Championships	Staten Island, New York	7th	1500m	4:13.65
2026	USATF Outdoor Championships	New York City, New York	5th	5000m	15:12.80
