= Chris McMeekin =

British middle-distance runner

Personal information
- Born: 1 December 1956 (age 69) Glasgow, Scotland

Sport
- Sport: Middle-distance running
- Event: 800 metres

Chris McMeekin (married Whittingham; born 1 December 1956) is a British middle-distance runner. She competed in the women's 800 metres at the 1976 Summer Olympics.

McMeekin competed in the AIAW for the Iowa State Cyclones track and field team, placing 2nd in the 4 × 800 m relay at the 1981 AIAW Outdoor Track and Field Championships.
