= Angela Wright-Scott =

American hurdler (born 1961)

Personal information
- Nationality: American
- Born: October 11, 1961 (age 64)

Sport
- Sport: Track and field
- Event: 400 metres hurdles

Angela Wright-Scott (born November 10, 1961) is an American hurdler. She competed in the women's 400 metres hurdles at the 1984 Summer Olympics.

Competing for the Florida State Seminoles track and field team, Wright-Scott won the 1983 NCAA Division I Outdoor Track and Field Championships in the 4 × 400 m.
