= Doriane Coleman =

Swiss-born American law professor

- Born: Doriane Lambelet; Lausanne, Switzerland
- Education: B.A., Cornell; JD, Georgetown Law
- Occupations: Law professor, Writer
- Spouse: James Earl Coleman
- Children: 2

Doriane Lambelet Coleman is a Swiss-American professor at Duke Law School, where she specializes in scholarship on women, sports, children, and law. Her most recent writing has centered on sex, its evolving definition, and the implications of this evolution for law and society. The first two articles in this series – "Sex in Sport" and "Re-affirming the Value of the Sports Exception to Title IX's General Non-Discrimination Rule" – have been widely read and used in the development of eligibility criteria for the female category. A third article – "Sex Neutrality" – traces the history of sex in law and addresses the merits of a final move from sex skepticism to sex-blindness. Her book, On Sex and Gender – A Commonsense Approach (2024), expands on these themes for a broader audience.

== Early life and education ==
Coleman was born in Lausanne, Switzerland as Doriane Lambelet. She attended Villanova University, becoming one of the first women to receive a track scholarship there. She then transferred to Cornell where she received a Bachelor of Arts degree in 1982. She attended Georgetown Law, where she was an editor of the Georgetown Law Journal and earned her Juris Doctor degree in 1988.

Before law school, Coleman ran the 800 meters in collegiate and international competition. She was a multiple All American, All East, and All Ivy athlete, the U.S. National Collegiate Indoor Champion in the 800 meters in 1982, the U.S. National Indoor Champion in the 4 x 400 meters relay in 1982, and the Swiss National Champion in the 800 meters in 1982 and 1983. Over the course of her athletic career she competed for Villanova and Cornell, the Swiss and U.S. National Teams, Athletics West, the Santa Monica and Atoms Track Clubs, and Lausanne Sports. During her track career, she was also known as Doriane McClive.

== Legal career ==
After law school Coleman worked at the Washington, D.C. law firm Wilmer, Cutler & Pickering. While there she helped develop the world’s first random, out-of-competition drug-testing program for USA Track & Field.

She began her academic career at Howard University School of Law in 1992 and has been at Duke University School of Law since 1994. At Duke University, Coleman is a Faculty Fellow and Member of the Advisory Council of the Kenan Institute for Ethics, and a Faculty Associate of the Trent Center for Bioethics, Humanities & History of Medicine at the School of Medicine. She is also a member of the University’s Athletic Council and co-director of the Law School’s Center for Sports Law and Policy.

She has published numerous works on parental rights including two on the mature minor doctrine about whether minors can legally consent to medical treatment without parental consent or over parental objections. She has written about sports governance and the Olympic Movement including about the Court of Arbitration for Sport.

Her academic writing has appeared in many legal and medical journals including in such publications as the Columbia Law Review, Duke Law Journal, Notre Dame Law Review, Cardozo Law Review, William and Mary Law Review, Law & Contemporary Problems, American Journal of Law and Medicine, Journal of the American Medical Association, Pediatrics, Journal of Law and the Biosciences, American Journal of International Law Unbound, and the International Sports Law Review. Her op-eds about women in sports have appeared in The Washington Post and The New York Times.

In 2016, Coleman authored an op-ed arguing against a North Carolina law that barred transgender people from using bathrooms that match their gender identity. In 2021, she co-authored an op-ed arguing that North Carolina should not bar transgender girls from all female sports. In 2022, she condemned North Carolina's H.B. 358, a bill that prevented transgender girls from participating in high school girls' sports, for drawing unfair conclusions from her research. She was co-chair of Duke Law's Law and Contemporary Problems when they published a special issue entitled "Sex in Law." The journal contained an essay by Kathleen Stock that some claimed was transphobic and eight student editors resigned rather than be associated with the essay.

== Publications ==
- Coleman, D., and D. Beskind. Torts: Doctrine and Process. Duke University Press, 2023.
- Coleman, D., and K. Dodge. Preventing Child Maltreatment: Community Approaches. Guilford Press, 2009.
- Coleman, D. Fixing Columbine: The Challenge to American Liberalism. Carolina Academic Press, 2002.

== Personal life ==
Coleman lives in Durham, North Carolina and is married to attorney and law professor James Earl Coleman. They have two children.
