= Susan Brownell =

American anthropology professor

- Occupation: Cultural Anthropology

Academic background
- Education: University of Virginia; University of California Santa Barbara
- Doctoral advisor: Donald Brown

Academic work
- Institutions: University of Missouri-St. Louis

Susan Brownell is a Curator's Distinguished professor of anthropology at the University of Missouri-St. Louis. She is known for her work on sport in China, the Olympic Games, World's Fairs, and the anthropology of the body and gender.

== Early life and education ==
Brownell's childhood was spent in Virginia where she competed in track and field for Lexington High School. She attended the University of Virginia on an athletic scholarship, specializing in the pentathlon and heptathlon. From 1980 to 1982, she placed in the top three in the Collegiate (AIAW) indoor pentathlon championships and the top six in the Collegiate (AIAW and NCAA) outdoor pentathlon and heptathlon championships and was a multiple All-American. She competed in the U.S. Track and Field Olympic Trials in 1980 and 1984, placing seventh in 1980. In 1982 she received her B.A. from the University of Virginia.

As a graduate student, Brownell went to China to study Chinese at Peking University in 1985, where she joined the track team and was selected to represent Beijing City in the 1986 National College Games. In 1990 she earned a Ph.D. in anthropology from the University of California, Santa Barbara. After visiting assistant professorships at Middlebury College, the University of Washington, and Yale University, Brownell joined the University of Missouri–St. Louis in 1994.

== Work ==
Brownell's first introduction to China was from stories her grandmother told her about the Mississippi Delta Chinese that she grew up with. Brownell's great-grandfather, Earl Leroy Brewer, was governor of Mississippi (1912–1916) and the lead attorney on two lawsuits on behalf of children of Chinese immigrants denied entry to White schools in the 1920s that were appealed to the U.S. Supreme Court, Gong Lum v. Rice (1927) and Joe Tin Lun v. Bond (1929). Some of her work focuses on the body in culture and society; medical anthropology; gender and sexuality; plastic surgery; beauty pageants; and world's fairs.

Brownell was in China at the Beijing Sport University for one year with funding from the Fulbright Program. During that period her research centered on the 2008 Summer Olympics which were held in Beijing.

== Selected publications ==
- Brownell, Susan (1995). Training the Body for China: Sports in the Moral Order of the People's Republic (1st ed.). Chicago: University of Chicago Press. ISBN 978-0-226-07647-8.
- Laqueur, Thomas (2002). Brownell, Susan; Wasserstrom, Jeffrey N. (eds.). Chinese Femininities/Chinese Masculinities: A Reader. Berkeley: University of California Press. ISBN 978-0-520-21103-2.
- Brownell, Susan (2008). Beijing's Games: What the Olympics Mean to China. Lanham (Md.): Rowman & Littlefield Publishers. ISBN 978-0-7425-5640-9.
- Brownell, Susan (2008). The 1904 Anthropology Days and Olympic Games: Sport, Race, and American Imperialism. Lincoln: University of Nebraska Press. ISBN 978-0-8032-1098-1.

== Awards and honors ==
In 2015, she won the University of Missouri St. Louis's Chancellor's Award for Research and Creativity.
