= Florida State Seminoles track and field =

- Founded: 1948; 78 years ago
- University: Florida State University
- Head coach: Matt Kane (3rd season)
- Conference: ACC
- Location: Tallahassee, Florida, US
- Nickname: Seminoles
- Colors: Garnet and gold

NCAA Indoor National Championships
- Women: 1984

NCAA Outdoor National Championships
- Men: 2006, 2007 (vacated), 2008; Women: 1985

Conference Indoor Championships
- Men: 1994, 2003, 2004, 2005, 2006, 2007, 2008, 2009, 2010, 2012, 2014, 2018, 2019, 2020, 2026; Women: 2009, 2014, 2018, 2021

Conference Outdoor Championships
- Men: 1950, 1951, 1972, 1973, 1974, 1977, 1978, 1979, 1980, 1981, 1982, 1983, 1984, 1985, 1986, 1987, 1988, 1989, 1990, 1991, 2002, 2003, 2005, 2006, 2007, 2008, 2009, 2010, 2011, 2013, 2014, 2015, 2018, 2021, 2022; Women: 1989, 1990, 1991, 2000, 2009, 2014, 2016, 2019, 2021

The track and field teams of Florida State University (variously Florida State or FSU) compete in the Atlantic Coast Conference and are coached by Matt Kane.

The men's team has won fifteen indoor conference championships, thirty-five outdoor conference championships, and two outdoor national championships. The women's team has won four indoor conference championships, nine outdoor conference championships, four indoor national championships, and three outdoor national championships.

== History ==
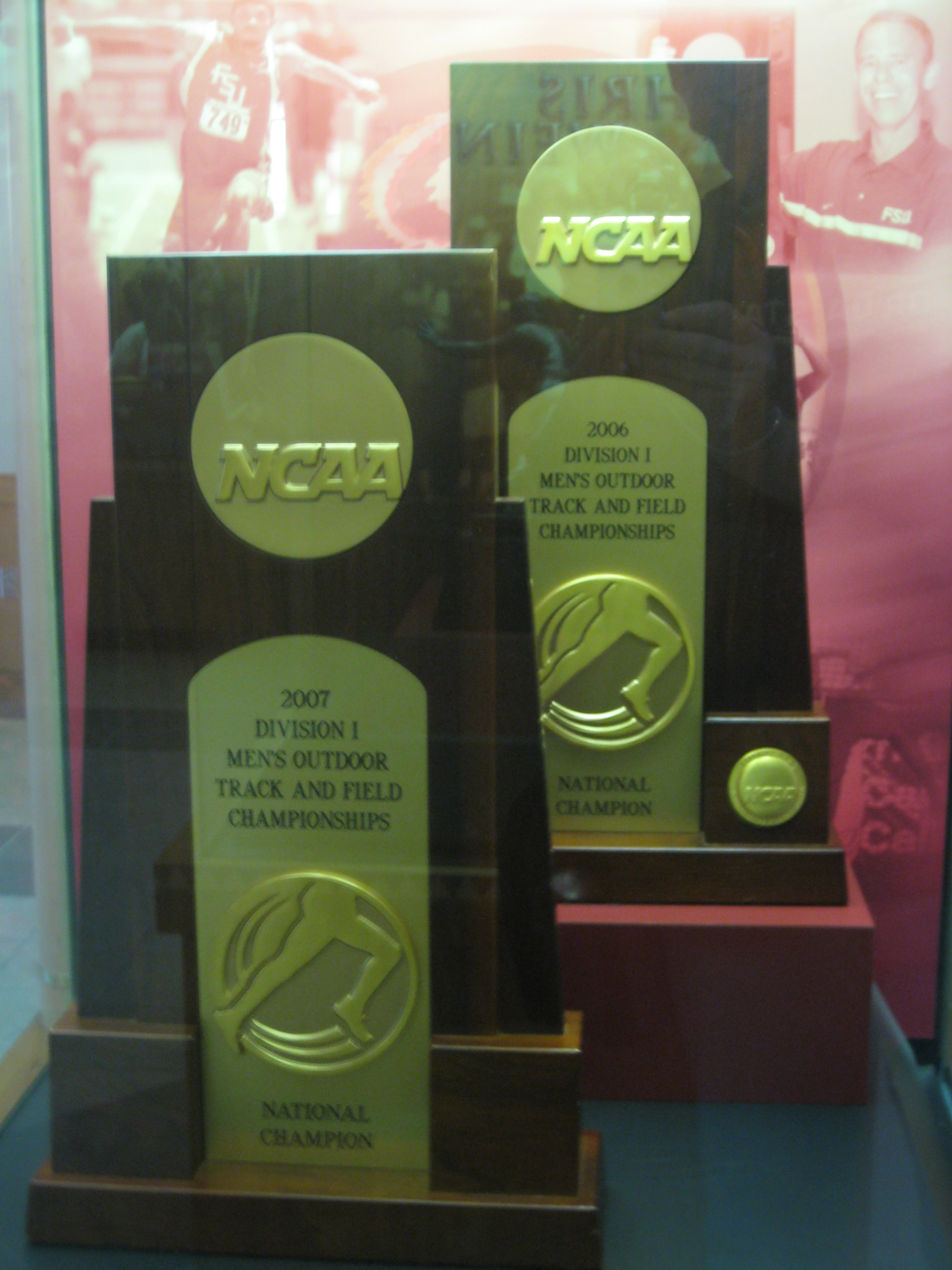
FSU's NCAA Championship trophies

Under head coach Bob Braman and associate head coach Harlis Meaders, the Florida State men's Track & Field team won the NCAA National Championship three times in a row from 2005 to 2007; in 2007, when FSU won its second consecutive men's Track & Field NCAA National Championship, Walter Dix became the first person to hold the individual title in the 100 m, 200 m, and 4 × 100 m Relay at the same time.

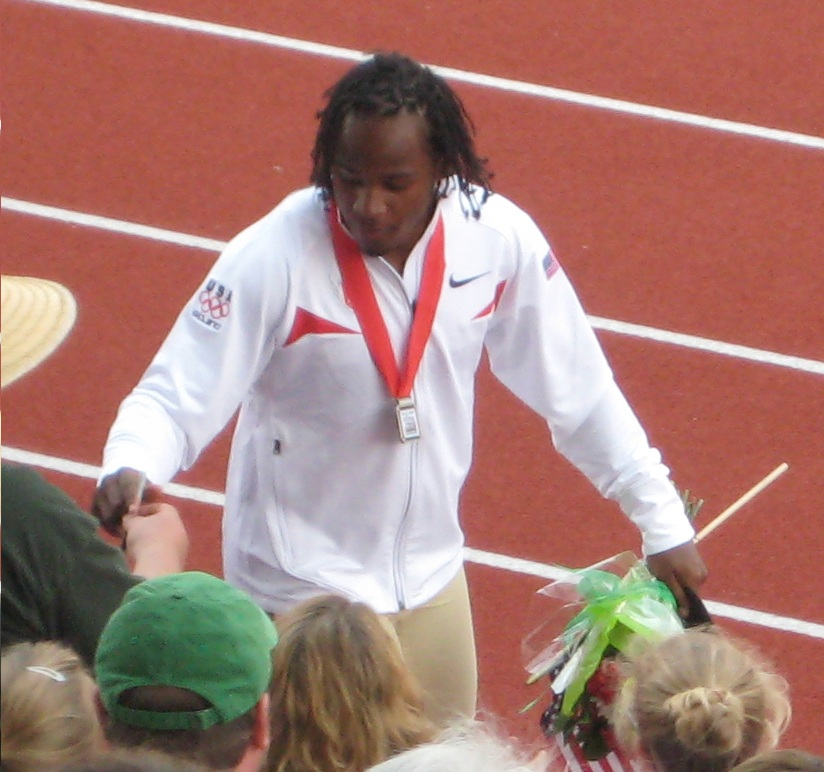
Walter Dix won multiple national titles as a Seminole.

On February 7, 2010, the Seminoles vacated their 2007 Men's Outdoor Track and Field NCAA Championship in the wake of the Florida State University academic-athletic scandal.

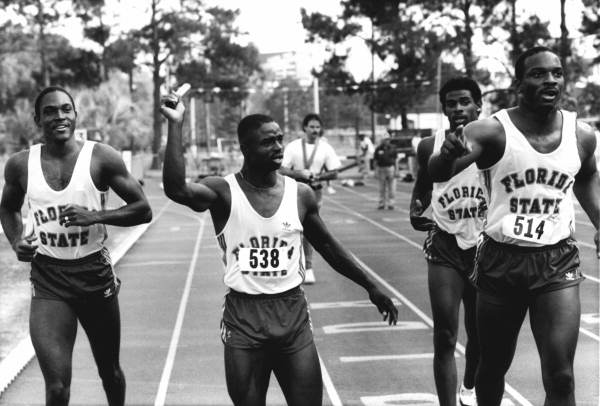
The Seminole track and field program began in 1948.

Ngonidzashe Makusha won the school's first Bowerman Award in 2011. In 2022, Trey Cunningham won the individual national title in hurdles and also won The Bowerman. Following the 2024 season, Braman retired after serving as coach for twenty-one seasons.

== Facilities ==
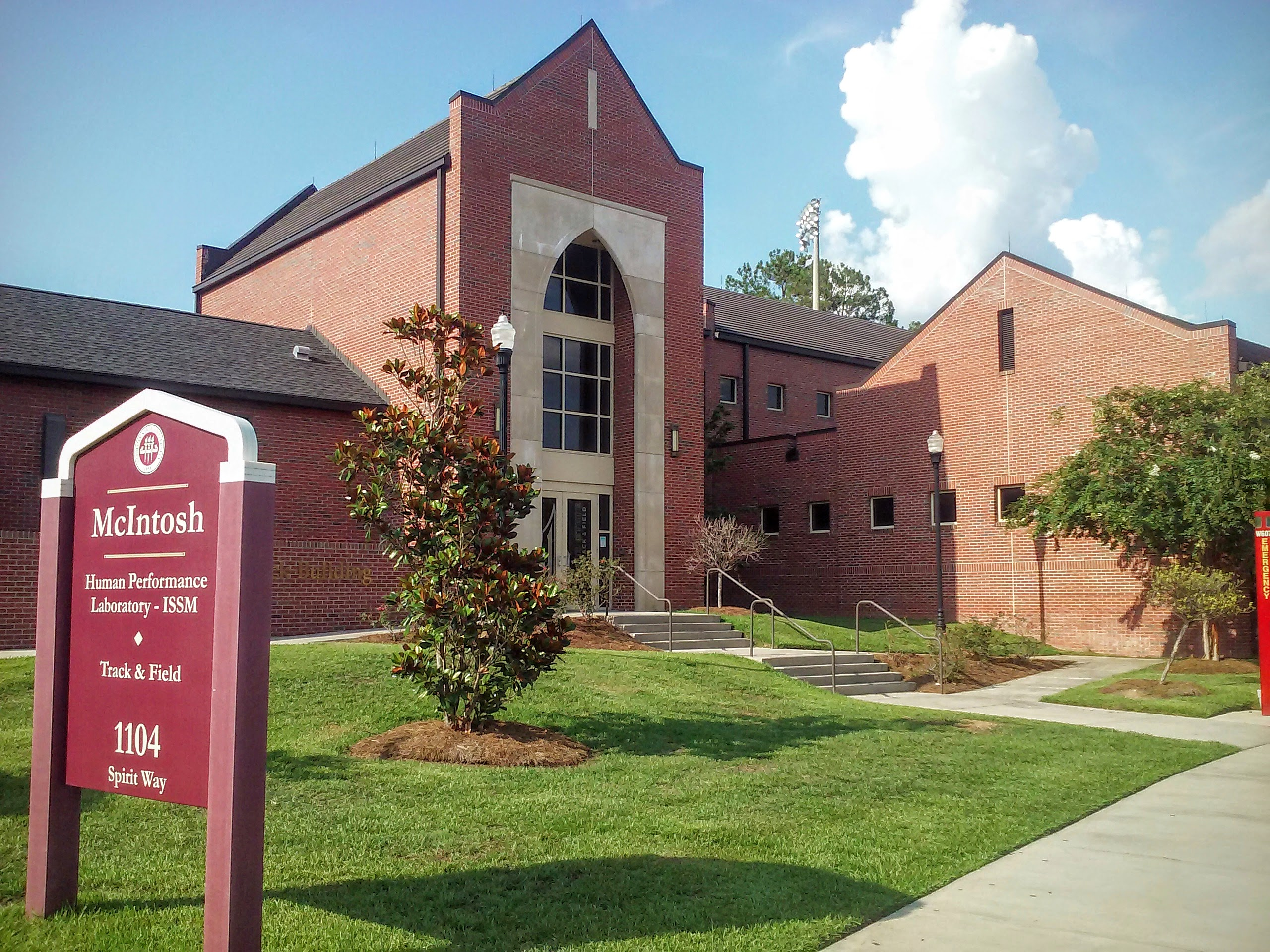
Entrance to the Mike Long Track & McIntosh Building

The Florida State Seminoles compete in the track and field building complex on the south end of Mike Long Track, the Mcintosh Track and Field Building, named after Michael A. Mcintosh.

== Conference Honors ==
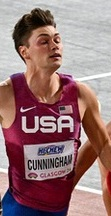
Trey Cunningham received multiple awards as a Seminole.

=== Men's Indoor ===
- ACC Most Valuable Performer
  - Phillip Riley - 1994
  - Tom Lancashire - 2005
  - Ricardo Chambers - 2006
- ACC Performer of the Year (Track)
  - Andrew Lemoncello - 2007
  - Maurice Mitchell - 2010, 2011, 2012
  - Dentarius Locke - 2014
  - Kasaun James - 2019
  - Trey Cunningham - 2020, 2022
- ACC Performer of the Year (Field)
  - Gonzalo Barroilhet - 2008
  - Ngoni Makusha - 2009
  - Isaac Grimes - 2021
  - Jeremiah Davis - 2023, 2024
- ACC Freshman of the Year
  - Rafeeq Curry - 2003
  - Walter Dix - 2005
  - Gonzalo Barroilhet - 2008
  - Stephen Newbold - 2012
  - Kendal Williams - 2015
  - Trey Cunningham - 2018
  - Bryand Rincher - 2019
  - Taylor Banks - 2020
- ACC Coach of the Year
- ACC Championship MVP (Track)
  - Maurice Mitchell - 2010, 2011, 2012
  - Stephen Newbold - 2013
  - Darryl Haraway - 2017
  - Kasaun James - 2019
- ACC Championship MVP (Field)
  - Phillip Young - 2013
  - Jeremiah Davis - 2023
- ACC Coach of the Year
  - Terry Long - 1994, 2003
  - Bob Braman - 2005, 2006, 2007, 2009, 2012, 2014, 2018, 2019, 2020
  - Matt Kane - 2026

=== Women's Indoor ===
- ACC Most Valuable Performer
  - Sheryl Covington - 1994
- ACC Performer of the Year
  - Shenese Walker - 2026
- ACC Performer of the Year (Track)
  - Ka’Tia Seymour - 2019, 2020
- ACC Performer of the Year (Field)
  - Kimberly Williams - 2010
  - Michelle Jenije - 2012
- ACC Freshman of the Year
  - Kimberly Williams - 2008
  - Chelsea Jarvis - 2015
  - Eleonora Omoregie - 2017
  - Dajaz DeFrand - 2023
- ACC Championship MVP (Track)
  - Ka’Tia Seymour - 2018, 2019, 2020
  - Edidiong Odiong - 2022
- ACC Coach of the Year
  - Bob Braman - 2009, 2014, 2018

=== Men's Outdoor ===
- ACC Most Valuable Performer
  - Joe Allen - 2001
  - Craphonso Thorpe - 2003
  - Tom Lancashire - 2005
  - Rafeeq Curry - 2006
  - Kyvon Tatham - 2025
- ACC Performer of the Year (Track)
  - Walter Dix - 2007
  - Charles Clark - 2009
  - Maurice Mitchell - 2011, 2012
  - Dentarius Locke - 2013, 2014
  - Andre Ewers - 2018
  - Trey Cunningham - 2022
- ACC Performer of the Year (Field)
  - Ngoni Makusha - 2011
  - Jeremiah Davis - 2024
- ACC Freshman of the Year
  - Matt Mason - 2001
  - Garrett Johnson - 2003
  - Walter Dix - 2005
  - Maurice Mitchell - 2009
  - Stephen Newbold - 2012
  - Kendal Williams - 2015
  - Trey Cunningham - 2018
  - Bryand Rincher - 2019
- ACC Championship MVP (Track)
  - Maurice Mitchell - 2010, 2011, 2012
  - Dentarius Locke - 2013, 2014
  - Andre Ewers- 2018, 2019
- ACC Championship MVP (Field)
  - Michael Putman - 2011
  - Armani Wallace - 2017
  - Corion Knight - 2018
  - Jeremiah Davis - 2022, 2023
- ACC Coach of the Year
  - Terry Long - 2000, 2002, 2003
  - Bob Braman - 2005, 2006, 2007, 2011, 2013, 2014, 2015, 2018, 2022

=== Women's Outdoor ===
- ACC Most Valuable Performer
  - Radhiya Teagle - 1995
  - Tonya Carter - 2000
  - Shenese Walker - 2025, 2026
- ACC Performer of the Year
  - Shenese Walker - 2026
- ACC Performer of the Year (Field)
  - Kimberly Williams - 2008, 2009
  - Kellion Knibb - 2016
  - Lauri Paredes Meza - 2018
  - Shanice Love - 2019
- ACC Performer of the Year (Track)
  - Colleen Quigley - 2015
- ACC Freshman of the Year
  - Laura Bowerman - 2005
  - Lydia Willemse - 2006
  - Kimberly Williams - 2008
  - Sage Watson- 2013
  - Shauna Helps - 2016
  - Ka’Tia Seymour - 2018
  - Dajaz DeFrand -2023
  - Rylee Blade - 2026
- ACC Championship MVP (Track)
  - Ka’Tia Seymour - 2019
  - Edidiong Odiong - 2022
- ACC Championship MVP (Field)
  - Gleneve Grange - 2017
- ACC Coach of the Year
  - Terry Long - 2000
  - Bob Braman - 2009, 2013, 2016, 2019

== See also ==
- Florida State Seminoles
- Florida State Seminoles cross country
- History of Florida State University
- List of Florida State University professional athletes
