= Athletics at the 1978 Commonwealth Games – Men's 4 × 400 metres relay =

Men's 4 × 400 metres relay at the Commonwealth Games

The men's 4 × 400 metres relay event at the 1978 Commonwealth Games was held on 11 and 12 August at the Commonwealth Stadium in Edmonton, Alberta, Canada.

== Medalists ==
| Gold | Silver | Bronze |
|---|---|---|
| Kenya; Washington Njiri; Daniel Kimaiyo; Bill Koskei; Joel Ngetich | Jamaica; Clive Barriffe; Bertland Cameron; Colin Bradford; Floyd Brown; Seymour Newman* | Australia; John Higham; Chum Darvall; Garry Brown; Rick Mitchell |

*Athletes who competed in heats only

== Results ==
=== Heats ===
Qualification: First 3 teams of each heat (Q) plus the next 2 fastest (q) qualified for the final.

| Rank | Heat | Nation | Athletes | Time | Notes |
|---|---|---|---|---|---|
| 1 | 2 | Canada | Frank Van Doorn, Brian Saunders, Dacre Bowen, Glenn Bogue | 3:06.75 | Q |
| 2 | 2 | Kenya | Washington Njiri, Daniel Kimaiyo, Bill Koskei, Joel Ngetich | 3:06.82 | Q |
| 3 | 2 | England | Terry Whitehead, Alan Pascoe, Richard Ashton, Glen Cohen | 3:06.88 | Q |
| 4 | 2 | Scotland | Roger Jenkins, Paul Forbes, Peter Hoffman, David Jenkins | 3:06.90 | q |
| 5 | 1 | Jamaica | Clive Barriffe, Bertland Cameron, Colin Bradford, Floyd Brown, Seymour Newman | 3:09.17 | Q |
| 6 | 1 | Trinidad and Tobago | Joseph Coombs, Mike Solomon, Mike Paul, Roy Astor | 3:09.31 | Q |
| 7 | 1 | Australia | John Higham, Chum Darvall, Garry Brown, Rick Mitchell | 3:09.32 | Q |
| 8 | 1 | Antigua and Barbuda | Elroy Turner, Cuthbert Jacobs, Lester Flax, Fred Sowerby | 3:11.72 | q |
| 9 | 1 | Wales | Berwyn Price, Jeff Griffiths, Michael Delaney, Steve James | 3:11.89 | |
| 10 | 1 | Saint Lucia | Genevieve Nestor, Heligar Calderon, John Erysthee, Linus Ambrose | 3:22.96 | |
| | 2 | Bermuda | | DNS | |

=== Final ===
| Rank | Nation | Athletes | Time | Notes |
|---|---|---|---|---|
| 1st place, gold medalist(s) | Kenya | Washington Njiri, Daniel Kimaiyo, Bill Koskei, Joel Ngetich | 3:03.54 | |
| 2nd place, silver medalist(s) | Jamaica | Clive Barriffe, Bertland Cameron, Colin Bradford, Floyd Brown | 3:04.00 | |
| 3rd place, bronze medalist(s) | Australia | John Higham, Chum Darvall, Garry Brown, Rick Mitchell | 3:04.23 | |
| 4 | Canada | Frank Van Doorn, Brian Saunders, Dacre Bowen, Glenn Bogue | 3:05.94 | |
| 5 | Trinidad and Tobago | Joseph Coombs, Mike Solomon, Mike Paul, Roy Astor | 3:06.73 | |
| 6 | Scotland | Roger Jenkins, Paul Forbes, Peter Hoffman, David Jenkins | 3:07.73 | |
| 7 | Antigua and Barbuda | Elroy Turner, Cuthbert Jacobs, Lester Flax, Fred Sowerby | 3:10.45 | |
| | England | Terry Whitehead, Alan Pascoe, Glen Cohen, Richard Ashton | DQ | |
