= Athletics at the 1978 Commonwealth Games – Men's 400 metres =

Men's 400 metres at the Commonwealth Games

The men's 400 metres event at the 1978 Commonwealth Games was held on 6 and 7 August at the Commonwealth Stadium in Edmonton, Alberta, Canada.

== Medalists ==
Gold	Silver	Bronze
Rick Mitchell; Australia	Joseph Coombs; Trinidad and Tobago	Glenn Bogue; Canada

== Results ==
=== Heats ===
Held on 6 August

Qualification: First 5 in each heat (Q) and the next 2 fastest (q) qualify for the quarterfinals.

Rank	Heat	Name	Nationality	Time	Notes
1	6	Joel Ngetich	Kenya	46.50	Q
2	4	Rick Mitchell	Australia	46.74	Q
3	5	Glenn Bogue	Canada	46.77	Q
4	5	Clyde Edwards	Barbados	46.78	Q
5	6	Glen Cohen	England	47.15	Q
6	4	Washington Njiri	Kenya	47.20	Q
7	5	Chum Darvall	Australia	47.42	Q
7	6	John Bandu	Ghana	47.42	Q
9	2	Richard Ashton	England	47.50	Q
10	3	Terry Whitehead	England	47.52	Q
11	2	Joseph Coombs	Trinidad and Tobago	47.53	Q
12	4	Michael Delaney	Wales	47.56	Q
13	2	Jeremiah Ongwae	Kenya	47.61	Q
14	3	Rayfield Beaton	Guyana	47.77	Q
15	1	David Jenkins	Scotland	47.78	Q
16	1	Fred Sowerby	Antigua and Barbuda	47.82	Q
17	4	Clive Beattie	Northern Ireland	47.83	Q
18	1	Mike Paul	Trinidad and Tobago	47.87	Q
19	5	Roger Jenkins	Scotland	47.93	Q
20	1	Jeff Griffiths	Wales	47.97	Q
21	6	Bevan Smith	New Zealand	48.02	Q
22	4	Mike Solomon	Trinidad and Tobago	48.14	Q
23	2	Brian Saunders	Canada	48.26	Q
24	3	John Higham	Australia	48.27	Q
25	6	Appunidage Premachandra	Sri Lanka	48.30	Q
26	3	Zvonko Stankovic	Canada	48.31	Q
27	2	Elroy Turner	Antigua and Barbuda	48.46	Q
28	1	Bertland Cameron	Jamaica	48.49	Q
29	3	Benjamin Soglo	Ghana	48.53	Q
30	6	Carlsen Phillips	Bermuda	48.77	q
31	2	Renelda Swan	Bermuda	48.78	q
32	3	David Anderson	Isle of Man	48.80	
33	1	Vaughn Harvey	Bermuda	48.86	
34	5	Donald Pierre	Grenada	49.19	Q
35	4	Lester Flax	Antigua and Barbuda	49.42	
36	6	Norris Bailey	Belize	49.64	
37	5	Heligar Calderon	Saint Lucia	50.04	
38	2	Keith Rocque	Saint Vincent and the Grenadines	50.15	
39	4	Henry Carver	Mauritius	50.76	
40	5	Bambo Fatty	Gambia	50.98	
41	3	Michael Olliviere	Saint Vincent and the Grenadines	51.15	
42	1	Genevieve Nestor	Saint Lucia	51.39	

=== Quarterfinals ===
Held on 6 August

Qualification: First 3 in each heat (Q) and the next 4 fastest (q) qualify for the semifinals.

Rank	Heat	Name	Nationality	Time	Notes
1	3	Glenn Bogue	Canada	46.06	Q
2	2	Richard Ashton	England	46.27	Q
3	4	Rick Mitchell	Australia	46.36	Q
4	1	Clyde Edwards	Barbados	46.38	Q
5	2	Joseph Coombs	Trinidad and Tobago	46.40	Q
6	3	Joel Ngetich	Kenya	46.43	Q
7	3	Glen Cohen	England	46.45	Q
8	2	Washington Njiri	Kenya	46.46	Q
9	1	Terry Whitehead	England	46.52	Q
10	1	Brian Saunders	Canada	46.59	Q
11	2	David Jenkins	Scotland	46.66	q
12	2	Chum Darvall	Australia	46.71	q
13	1	Bevan Smith	New Zealand	46.77	q
14	4	Fred Sowerby	Antigua and Barbuda	46.80	Q
15	4	Mike Solomon	Trinidad and Tobago	46.89	Q
16	1	Rayfield Beaton	Guyana	47.07	q
17	1	Bertland Cameron	Jamaica	47.20	
18	3	John Bandu	Ghana	47.21	
19	4	Jeremiah Ongwae	Kenya	47.31	
20	1	Michael Delaney	Wales	47.41	
21	4	Jeff Griffiths	Wales	47.41	
22	3	Roger Jenkins	Scotland	47.44	
23	4	Clive Beattie	Northern Ireland	47.77	
24	3	Mike Paul	Trinidad and Tobago	47.83	
25	3	John Higham	Australia	47.84	
26	4	Zvonko Stankovic	Canada	48.20	
27	4	Benjamin Soglo	Ghana	48.29	
28	2	Elroy Turner	Antigua and Barbuda	48.35	
29	2	Renelda Swan	Bermuda	48.77	
30	3	Carlsen Phillips	Bermuda	48.99	
31	2	Donald Pierre	Grenada	50.45	
	1	Appunidage Premachandra	Sri Lanka	DNS	

=== Semifinals ===
Held on 7 August

Qualification: First 4 in each semifinal (Q) qualify directly for the final.

Rank	Heat	Name	Nationality	Time	Notes
1	1	Fred Sowerby	Antigua and Barbuda	46.86	Q
2	1	Joseph Coombs	Trinidad and Tobago	46.87	Q
3	1	Richard Ashton	England	46.88	Q
3	2	Rick Mitchell	Australia	46.88	Q
5	2	Glen Cohen	England	47.00	Q
6	1	Brian Saunders	Canada	47.32	Q
6	2	Glenn Bogue	Canada	47.32	Q
8	1	David Jenkins	Scotland	47.37	
9	1	Chum Darvall	Australia	47.41	
10	2	Mike Solomon	Trinidad and Tobago	47.61	Q
11	1	Clyde Edwards	Barbados	47.62	
12	2	Joel Ngetich	Kenya	47.64	
13	2	Terry Whitehead	England	47.85	
14	2	Rayfield Beaton	Guyana	48.05	
15	2	Bevan Smith	New Zealand	48.25	
16	1	Washington Njiri	Kenya	48.55	

=== Final ===
Held on 7 August

Rank	Name	Nationality	Time	Notes
1st place, gold medalist(s)	Rick Mitchell	Australia	46.34	
2nd place, silver medalist(s)	Joseph Coombs	Trinidad and Tobago	46.54	
3rd place, bronze medalist(s)	Glenn Bogue	Canada	46.63	
4	Mike Solomon	Trinidad and Tobago	46.97	
5	Glen Cohen	England	46.99	
6	Richard Ashton	England	47.32	
7	Fred Sowerby	Antigua and Barbuda	47.51	
8	Brian Saunders	Canada	48.01	
