= Athletics at the 1978 Commonwealth Games – Men's 200 metres =

Men's 200 metres at the Commonwealth Games

The men's 200 metres event at the 1978 Commonwealth Games was held on 8 and 10 August at the Commonwealth Stadium in Edmonton, Alberta, Canada.

== Medalists ==
Gold	Silver	Bronze
Allan Wells; Scotland	James Gilkes; Guyana	Colin Bradford; Jamaica

== Results ==
=== Heats ===
Held on 8 August

Qualification: First 5 in each heat (Q) and the next 2 fastest (q) qualify for the quarterfinals.

Wind:
Heat 1: +1.9 m/s, Heat 2: +0.2 m/s, Heat 3: ? m/s, Heat 4: ? m/s, Heat 5: ? m/s, Heat 6: ? m/s

Rank	Heat	Name	Nationality	Time	Notes
1	5	Colin Bradford	Jamaica	20.87	Q
2	4	Don Quarrie	Jamaica	20.97	Q
3	3	James Gilkes	Guyana	21.00	Q
4	5	Christopher Brathwaite	Trinidad and Tobago	21.14	Q
5	1	Dacre Bowen	Canada	21.15	Q
6	2	Albert Lomotey	Ghana	21.25	Q
7	2	Richard Hopkins	Australia	21.25	Q
8	4	Mike McFarlane	England	21.28	Q
9	5	Rickey Moxey	Bahamas	21.29	Q
10	1	Floyd Brown	Jamaica	21.30	Q
11	3	Daniel Biocchi	Canada	21.33	Q
11	4	Edwin Noel	Trinidad and Tobago	21.33	Q
13	5	Calvin Dill	Bermuda	21.34	Q
14	6	Allan Wells	Scotland	21.35	Q
14	1	Paul Narracott	Australia	21.35	Q
16	6	Trevor Hoyte	England	21.39	Q
17	1	Tochi Mochache	Kenya	21.40	Q
18	6	Cole Doty	Canada	21.42	Q
19	5	Drew McMaster	Scotland	21.45	Q
20	4	Cameron Sharp	Scotland	21.52	Q
21	5	Rawle Clarke	Barbados	21.53	q
22	6	Ernest Obeng	Ghana	21.55	Q
23	5	Jeff Griffiths	Wales	21.56	q
24	2	Timothy Bonsor	England	21.59	Q
25	3	Ramaswamy Gnanasekharan	India	21.60	Q
26	3	Cuthbert Jacobs	Antigua and Barbuda	21.61	Q
27	2	Bevan Smith	New Zealand	21.62	Q
28	4	Peter Kipkirong	Kenya	21.69	Q
28	6	Clyde Edwards	Barbados	21.69	Q
30	2	Dave Roberts	Wales	21.70	Q
31	3	Alex Mutunga	Kenya	21.74	Q
32	1	David Lukuba	Tanzania	21.86	Q
33	3	Linus Ambrose	Saint Lucia	22.00	
34	2	Mokam Mwita	Tanzania	22.08	
35	1	Banana Jarju	Gambia	22.10	
35	4	Vaughn Harvey	Bermuda	22.10	
37	6	Letseka Nchee	Lesotho	22.17	
37	6	Kimberley Wade	Bermuda	22.17	
39	1	Francis Williams	Saint Vincent and the Grenadines	22.30	
40	2	Keith Rocque	Saint Vincent and the Grenadines	22.32	
41	4	Genevieve Nestor	Saint Lucia	22.45	
42	6	Jean Charlotte	Mauritius	22.67	
43	5	Ousman N'Dure	Gambia	22.73	
44	2	Molapi Bambatha	Lesotho	22.80	
45	4	Bamba Njie	Gambia	23.04	
	1	Anthony Husbands	Trinidad and Tobago	DNS	

=== Quarterfinals ===
Held on 8 August

Qualification: First 3 in each heat (Q) and the next 4 fastest (q) qualify for the semifinals.

Wind:
Heat 1: +1.1 m/s, Heat 2: +2.1 m/s, Heat 3: ? m/s, Heat 4: +1.8 m/s

Rank	Heat	Name	Nationality	Time	Notes
1	4	Allan Wells	Scotland	20.61	Q
2	1	Don Quarrie	Jamaica	20.66	Q
3	4	Colin Bradford	Jamaica	20.89	Q
4	2	James Gilkes	Guyana	20.97	Q
5	4	Trevor Hoyte	England	21.16	Q
6	4	Christopher Brathwaite	Trinidad and Tobago	21.22	q
7	2	Mike McFarlane	England	21.31	Q
8	2	Richard Hopkins	Australia	21.35	Q
9	1	Paul Narracott	Australia	21.37	Q
9	2	Floyd Brown	Jamaica	21.37	q
11	3	Albert Lomotey	Ghana	21.38	Q
12	4	Cole Doty	Canada	21.44	q
13	1	Timothy Bonsor	England	21.48	Q
14	2	Dacre Bowen	Canada	21.48	q
15	1	Daniel Biocchi	Canada	21.50	
16	3	Rawle Clarke	Barbados	21.51	Q
17	3	Calvin Dill	Bermuda	21.53	Q
18	1	Cameron Sharp	Scotland	21.54	
18	3	Drew McMaster	Scotland	21.54	
20	4	Bevan Smith	New Zealand	21.60	
21	3	Cuthbert Jacobs	Antigua and Barbuda	21.63	
22	4	Peter Kipkirong	Kenya	21.64	
23	4	Jeff Griffiths	Wales	21.65	
24	1	Edwin Noel	Trinidad and Tobago	21.66	
24	3	Rickey Moxey	Bahamas	21.66	
26	1	Ernest Obeng	Ghana	21.81	
27	1	Clyde Edwards	Barbados	21.85	
28	2	Dave Roberts	Wales	21.91	
29	2	Tochi Mochache	Kenya	21.94	
30	2	Ramaswamy Gnanasekharan	India	21.96	
31	3	Alex Mutunga	Kenya	22.16	
	3	David Lukuba	Tanzania	DNS	

=== Semifinals ===
Held on 10 August

Qualification: First 4 in each semifinal (Q) qualify directly for the final.

Wind:
Heat 1: -0.5 m/s, Heat 2: +3.6 m/s

Rank	Heat	Name	Nationality	Time	Notes
1	2	Allan Wells	Scotland	20.68	Q
2	2	Paul Narracott	Australia	20.71	Q
3	2	Floyd Brown	Jamaica	20.72	Q
4	2	James Gilkes	Guyana	20.75	Q
5	2	Timothy Bonsor	England	20.89	
6	2	Christopher Brathwaite	Trinidad and Tobago	21.10	
7	1	Colin Bradford	Jamaica	21.15	Q
8	2	Cole Doty	Canada	21.25	
9	1	Trevor Hoyte	England	21.31	Q
10	1	Richard Hopkins	Australia	21.42	Q
11	1	Calvin Dill	Bermuda	21.46	Q
12	1	Don Quarrie	Jamaica	21.49	
13	1	Albert Lomotey	Ghana	21.58	
14	1	Dacre Bowen	Canada	21.61	
15	1	Rawle Clarke	Barbados	22.14	
	2	Mike McFarlane	England	DNS	

=== Final ===
Held on 10 August

Wind: +4.4 m/s

Rank	Lane	Name	Nationality	Time	Notes
1st place, gold medalist(s)	3	Allan Wells	Scotland	20.12	
2nd place, silver medalist(s)	7	James Gilkes	Guyana	20.18	
3rd place, bronze medalist(s)	8	Colin Bradford	Jamaica	20.43	
4	2	Paul Narracott	Australia	20.74	
5	4	Floyd Brown	Jamaica	20.79	
6	6	Richard Hopkins	Australia	20.88	
7	5	Trevor Hoyte	England	20.90	
8	1	Calvin Dill	Bermuda	21.07	
