= Athletics at the 1978 Commonwealth Games – Men's 400 metres hurdles =

Men's 400 metres hurdles at the Commonwealth Games

The men's 400 metres hurdles event at the 1978 Commonwealth Games was held on 8 and 10 August at the Commonwealth Stadium in Edmonton, Alberta, Canada.

== Medalists ==
Gold	Silver	Bronze
Daniel Kimaiyo; Kenya	Garry Brown; Australia	Alan Pascoe; England

== Results ==
=== Heats ===
Held on 8 August

Qualification: First 4 in each heat (Q) and the next 4 fastest (q) qualify for the semifinals.

Rank	Heat	Name	Nationality	Time	Notes
1	1	Peter Kipchumba	Kenya	50.81	Q
2	1	Gladstone Williams	Canada	51.17	Q
3	1	Alan Pascoe	England	51.39	Q
4	1	Steve James	Wales	51.42	Q
5	1	Clive Beattie	Northern Ireland	51.45	q
6	1	Simit Bolkiah	Malaysia	54.36	q
1	2	Clive Barriffe	Jamaica	50.92	Q
2	2	William Koskei	Kenya	51.41	Q
3	2	Bill Hartley	England	51.89	Q
4	2	Mike Forgrave	Canada	??.??	Q
	2	Joseph Appiagyei	Ghana	DQ	
	2	Lutama Ibis	Tanzania	DNS	
1	3	Daniel Kimaiyo	Kenya	51.25	Q
2	3	Garry Brown	Australia	52.91	Q
3	3	Gary Oakes	England	53.36	Q
4	3	David Anderson	Isle of Man	53.75	Q
5	3	Phillip Mills	New Zealand	53.78	q
6	3	Daniel Taillon	Canada	54.12	q

=== Semifinals ===
Held on 8 August

Qualification: First 4 in each semifinal (Q) qualify directly for the final.

Rank	Heat	Name	Nationality	Time	Notes
1	1	Daniel Kimaiyo	Kenya	49.20	Q
2	2	Peter Kipchumba	Kenya	50.25	Q
3	2	William Koskei	Kenya	50.30	Q
4	1	Garry Brown	Australia	50.31	Q
5	2	Clive Barriffe	Jamaica	50.80	Q
6	1	Alan Pascoe	England	50.83	Q
7	1	Phillip Mills	New Zealand	50.92	Q
8	2	Gary Oakes	England	50.96	Q
9	2	Gladstone Williams	Canada	51.27	
10	2	Bill Hartley	England	51.57	
11	1	Mike Forgrave	Canada	51.98	
12	2	Clive Beattie	Northern Ireland	52.85	
13	1	Steve James	Wales	53.00	
14	1	David Anderson	Isle of Man	53.27	
15	1	Daniel Taillon	Canada	53.81	
	2	Simit Bolkiah	Malaysia	DNS	

=== Final ===
Held on 10 August

Rank	Lane	Name	Nationality	Time	Notes
1st place, gold medalist(s)	8	Daniel Kimaiyo	Kenya	49.48	
2nd place, silver medalist(s)	4	Garry Brown	Australia	50.04	
3rd place, bronze medalist(s)	3	Alan Pascoe	England	50.09	
4	1	Peter Kipchumba	Kenya	50.50	
5	6	William Koskei	Kenya	50.69	
6	7	Clive Barriffe	Jamaica	51.50	
7	2	Gary Oakes	England	51.60	
8	5	Phillip Mills	New Zealand	52.01	
