= Athletics at the 1978 Central American and Caribbean Games – Results =

These are partial results of the athletics competition at the 1978 Central American and Caribbean Games which took place between 15 and 20 July 1978, at the Estadio Atanasio Girardot in Medellín, Colombia.

== Men's results ==
=== 100 metres ===
Heats – 15 July

Rank	Heat	Name	Nationality	Time	Notes
1	1	Silvio Leonard	Cuba	10.27	Q
2	1	Rafael Félix	Dominican Republic	10.51	Q
1	2	Osvaldo Lara	Cuba	10.15	Q, GR
1	3	Guy Abrahams	Panama	10.19	Q
1	4	Ephraim Serrette	Trinidad and Tobago	10.32	Q
2	4	Rickey Moxey	Bahamas	10.35	Q
1	5	Miguel Condé	Venezuela	10.49	Q
2	?	Fabio García	Colombia	10.52	Q

Semifinals – 16 July

Rank	Heat	Name	Nationality	Time	Notes
1	1	Guy Abrahams	Panama	10.21	Q
2	1	Silvio Leonard	Cuba	10.27	Q
3	1	Gerardo Suero	Dominican Republic	10.37	Q
1	2	Osvaldo Lara	Cuba	10.24	Q

Final – 16 July

Rank	Lane	Name	Nationality	Time	Notes
1st place, gold medalist(s)	3	Silvio Leonard	Cuba	10.10	GR
2nd place, silver medalist(s)	5	Osvaldo Lara	Cuba	10.11	
3rd place, bronze medalist(s)	1	Guy Abrahams	Panama	10.20	
4	4	Fabio García	Colombia	10.43	
5	6	Ephraim Serrette	Trinidad and Tobago	10.48	
6	2	Gerardo Suero	Dominican Republic	10.49	

=== 200 metres ===
Heats – 17 July

Rank	Heat	Name	Nationality	Time	Notes
1	?	Anthony Husbands	Trinidad and Tobago	20.86	Q

Final – 18 July

Rank	Lane	Name	Nationality	Time	Notes
1st place, gold medalist(s)	4	Silvio Leonard	Cuba	20.49	GR
2nd place, silver medalist(s)	6	Anthony Husbands	Trinidad and Tobago	21.00	
3rd place, bronze medalist(s)	1	Guy Abrahams	Panama	21.15	
4	5	Rafael Félix	Dominican Republic	21.22	
5	2	Clyde Edwards	Barbados	21.23	
6	3	Fabio García	Colombia	21.44	

=== 400 metres ===
Heats – 15 July

Rank	Heat	Name	Nationality	Time	Notes
1	1	Seymour Newman	Jamaica	46.59	Q
2	1	Michael Paul	Trinidad and Tobago	47.29	Q
1	2	Joseph Coombs	Trinidad and Tobago	46.85	Q
2	2	Alberto Juantorena	Cuba	46.96	Q
?	?	Gerold Pawirodikromo	Suriname	47.09	Q, NR
3	?	Gabriel Lopera	Colombia	47.66	Q
4	?	Orominio Santaella	Puerto Rico	48.99	

Semifinals – 15 July

Rank	Heat	Name	Nationality	Time	Notes
5	2	Gabriel Lopera	Colombia	48.73	

Final – 16 July

Rank	Lane	Name	Nationality	Time	Notes
1st place, gold medalist(s)	4	Alberto Juantorena	Cuba	44.27	GR
2nd place, silver medalist(s)	2	Joseph Coombs	Trinidad and Tobago	45.41	
3rd place, bronze medalist(s)	3	Seymour Newman	Jamaica	46.11	
4	1	Clyde Edwards	Barbados	46.14	
5	6	Michael Paul	Trinidad and Tobago	46.62	
6	5	Carlos Álvarez	Cuba	46.72	

=== 800 metres ===
Heats – 15 July

Rank	Heat	Name	Nationality	Time	Notes
1	2	Osmán Escobar	Venezuela	1:53.23	Q
3	3	Jorge Ortiz	Puerto Rico	1:51.48	Q

Final – 16 July

Rank	Lane	Name	Nationality	Time	Notes
1st place, gold medalist(s)	1	Alberto Juantorena	Cuba	1:47.23	GR
2nd place, silver medalist(s)	3	Gerold Pawirodikromo	Suriname	1:47.46	NR
3rd place, bronze medalist(s)	4	Leandro Civil	Cuba	1:47.66	
4	6	Seymour Newman	Jamaica	1:47.69	
5	5	Eduardo Castro	Mexico	1:48.58	
6	2	Gabriel Lopera	Colombia	1:49.33	NR
	Jorge Ortíz	Puerto Rico	DNF		

=== 1500 metres ===
16 July

Rank	Name	Nationality	Time	Notes
1st place, gold medalist(s)	Luis Medina	Cuba	3:44.47	
2nd place, silver medalist(s)	Eduardo Castro	Mexico	3:45.14	
3rd place, bronze medalist(s)	Osmán Escobar	Venezuela	3:45.89	
4	Modesto Comprés	Dominican Republic	3:49.43	
5	Jorge Ortíz	Puerto Rico	3:52.03	
6	Hugo Villegas	Colombia	3:53.22	
7	Carlos Báez	Puerto Rico	3:56.49	
8	Gabriel Giraldo	Colombia	4:00.93	
9	Ignacio Melesio	Mexico	4:01.86	

=== 5000 metres ===
17 July

Rank	Name	Nationality	Time	Notes
1st place, gold medalist(s)	Rodolfo Gómez	Mexico	13:55.08	
2nd place, silver medalist(s)	Domingo Tibaduiza	Colombia	13:56.88	
3rd place, bronze medalist(s)	José Gómez	Mexico	14:27.33	
4	Gabriel Giraldo	Colombia	14:33.10	
5	Jaime Vélez	Puerto Rico	14:34.29	
6	Lucirio Garrido	Venezuela	14:41.52	
7	Víctor Gil	Venezuela	14:41.78	
8	Virgilio Herrera	Guatemala	15:07.34	
9	Teodoro Zalaya	Nicaragua	17:31.93	

=== 10,000 metres ===
15 July

Rank	Name	Nationality	Time	Notes
1st place, gold medalist(s)	Rodolfo Gómez	Mexico	29:34.64	GR
2nd place, silver medalist(s)	Domingo Tibaduiza	Colombia	29:38.66	
3rd place, bronze medalist(s)	Luis Hernández	Mexico	30:23.84	
4	Jaime Villate	Colombia	30:49.36	
5	Virgilio Herrera	Guatemala	31:20.08	
6	Aldo Allen	Cuba	31:37.07	
	Radamés González	Cuba	DNF	

=== Marathon ===
20 July

Rank	Name	Nationality	Time	Notes
1st place, gold medalist(s)	Radamés Vega	Puerto Rico	2:22:34	GR
2nd place, silver medalist(s)	Mario Cuevas	Mexico	2:23:07	
3rd place, bronze medalist(s)	José Granajo	Guatemala	2:26:04	
4	Radamés González	Cuba	2:27:42	
5	Víctor Rodríguez	Colombia	2:32:23	
6	Héctor Rodríguez	Colombia	2:33:13	
7	Eduardo Vera	Puerto Rico	2:40:49	
8	Javier Cuadro	Nicaragua	2:42:45	

=== 110 metres hurdles ===
Heats – 18 July

Rank	Heat	Name	Nationality	Time	Notes
1	1	Alejandro Casañas	Cuba	13.72	Q
2	1	Julio Ferrer	Puerto Rico	14.50	Q
2	2	José Santiago	Puerto Rico	15.01	Q

Final – 20 July

Rank	Lane	Name	Nationality	Time	Notes
1st place, gold medalist(s)	4	Alejandro Casañas	Cuba	13.67	GR
2nd place, silver medalist(s)	3	Mariano Reyes	Dominican Republic	14.68	
3rd place, bronze medalist(s)	6	Karl Smith	Jamaica	14.71	
4	5	José Santiago	Puerto Rico	15.02	
5	2	Carlos Cuervo	Colombia	15.49	
	1	Julio Ferrer	Puerto Rico	DNF	

=== 400 metres hurdles ===
Heats – 15 July

Rank	Heat	Name	Nationality	Time	Notes
1	1	Clive Barriffe	Jamaica	50.38	Q, =GR
2	1	Frank Montiéh	Cuba	51.90	Q
3	1	Julio Ferrer	Puerto Rico	52.94	Q
1	2	Alexis Misignak	Cuba	51.04	Q
2	2	José Santiago	Puerto Rico	52.22	Q

Final – 16 July

Rank	Lane	Name	Nationality	Time	Notes
1st place, gold medalist(s)	2	Clive Barriffe	Jamaica	50.16	GR
2nd place, silver medalist(s)	5	Julio Ferrer	Puerto Rico	50.86	
3rd place, bronze medalist(s)	3	Alexis Misignak	Cuba	50.97	
4	1	Frank Montiéh	Cuba	51.00	
5	6	José Santiago	Puerto Rico	51.54	

=== 3000 metres steeplechase ===
20 July

Rank	Name	Nationality	Time	Notes
1st place, gold medalist(s)	José Cobo	Cuba	8:46.39	GR
2nd place, silver medalist(s)	Carlos Martínez	Mexico	8:52.13	
3rd place, bronze medalist(s)	Jaime Villate	Colombia	8:56.29	
4	Rafael Baracaldo	Colombia	9:02.93	
5	Jorge Pitayo	Mexico	9:07.87	
6	Modesto Comprés	Dominican Republic	9:07.96	
7	Lucirio Garrido	Venezuela	9:16.36	
8	Víctor Gil	Venezuela	9:24.19	
9	Enrique Guevara	Costa Rica	9:39.35	
10	Carlos Báez	Puerto Rico	9:41.28	

=== 4 × 100 metres relay ===
20 July

Rank	Lane	Team	Name	Time	Notes
1st place, gold medalist(s)	4	Trinidad and Tobago	Eldwin Noel, Hasely Crawford, Anthony Husbands, Ephraim Serrette	39.13	GR
2nd place, silver medalist(s)	3	Cuba	Juan Saborit, Alejandro Casañas, Silvio Leonard, Osvaldo Lara	39.44	
3rd place, bronze medalist(s)	6	Dominican Republic	Juan Contreras, Gregorio García, Enrique Almarante, Rafael Félix	39.62	
4	5	Jamaica	Errol Quarrie, Floyd Brown, Oliver Heywood, Ray Mahoney	39.91	
5	2	Colombia	Mina Arquimedes, Edgar Biojo, William Moreno, Fabio García	40.53	
6	1	Netherlands Antilles	Lionel Rafaela, Magno Koeiman, Edsel Trompet, Siegfried Regales	41.35	

=== 4 × 400 metres relay ===
Heats – ? July

Rank	Heat	Team	Name	Time	Notes
4	1	Puerto Rico	Orominio Santaella, Jorge Ortíz, Julio Ferrer, José Santiago	3:10.90	

Final – 20 July

Rank	Lane	Team	Name	Time	Notes
1st place, gold medalist(s)	4	Jamaica	Clive Barriffe, Oliver Heywood, Floyd Brown, Bert Cameron	3:03.76	GR
2nd place, silver medalist(s)	3	Trinidad and Tobago	Anthony Myers, Michael Paul, Mike Solomon, Joseph Coombs	3:05.01	
3rd place, bronze medalist(s)	6	Cuba	Alexis Misignak, Ernesto Vinent, Carlos Álvarez, Alberto Juantorena	3:05.57	
4	2	Dominican Republic	Francisco Manrique, Alejandro Ricón, José Pimentel, Enrique Almarante	3:07.93	
5	1	Venezuela	Hipólito Brown, Alexis Herrera, Moisés Zambrano, Edison Reyes	3:08.51	
6	5	Bahamas	Michael Ambrister, Steve Hanna, Rickey Moxey, Chris Clarke	3:12.92	

=== 20 kilometres walk ===
16 July

Rank	Name	Nationality	Time	Notes
1st place, gold medalist(s)	Daniel Bautista	Mexico	1:29:10	GR
2nd place, silver medalist(s)	Raúl González	Mexico	1:31:58	
3rd place, bronze medalist(s)	Jorge Quiñones	Colombia	1:39:31	
4	Ernesto Alfaro	Colombia	1:41:45	
5	Alexis López	Costa Rica	1:41:50	
6	Edgar López	Costa Rica	1:41:50	
7	Henry Klein	United States Virgin Islands	1:46:14	
8	César Argüello	Nicaragua	1:46:49	
9	Wilmer Santiago	Puerto Rico	1:47:46	
10	David Félix	Puerto Rico	1:52:00	
11	Ángel Novoa	Nicaragua	2:01:51	

=== High jump ===
15 July

Rank	Name	Nationality	1.95	2.00	2.03	2.06	2.09	2.12	2.15	Result	Notes
1st place, gold medalist(s)	Richard Spencer	Cuba	–	o	–	o	–	o	xxx	2.12	GR
2nd place, silver medalist(s)	Rodolfo Madrigal	Costa Rica	–	o	o	xo	xo	xo	xxx	2.12	=GR
3rd place, bronze medalist(s)	Jamil Justiniano	Puerto Rico	xo	o	o	xxo	xo	xxx		2.09	
4	Cristóbal De León	Dominican Republic	–	x–	o	o	xxx			2.06	
5	Hermes Cabal	Colombia	o	o	o	xo	xxx			2.06	
6	Gabriel Díaz	Cuba	o	o	xxo	xxx				2.03	
7	Javier Vivo	Mexico	o	xxo	xxo	xxx				2.03	
8	Manuel Gómez	Dominican Republic	–	o	–	xxx				2.00	
8	Carlos Acosta	Puerto Rico	–	o	–	xxx				2.00	
10	Laird McLean	Trinidad and Tobago	o	o	xxx					2.00	

=== Pole vault ===
19 July

Rank	Name	Nationality	4.30	4.45	4.60	4.70	4.80	4.85	5.00	5.10	Result	Notes
1st place, gold medalist(s)	Augusto Perdomo	Cuba	–	–	xo	–	o	–	xxo	xr	5.00	GR
2nd place, silver medalist(s)	Elberto Pratt	Mexico	–	xo	o	o	o	xxx			4.80	
3rd place, bronze medalist(s)	Rubén Camino	Cuba	–	–	o	xo	o	–	xxx		4.80	
4	Edgardo Rivera	Puerto Rico	–	–	o	xo	–	xxx			4.70	
5	Luis Mascorro	Mexico	o	o	o	xxx					4.60	
	Ramón Zequeira	Puerto Rico	–	–	xxx						NM	

=== Long jump ===
18 July

Rank	Name	Nationality	#1	#2	#3	#4	#5	#6	Result	Notes
1st place, gold medalist(s)	David Giralt	Cuba	7.82	–	–	–	x	x	7.82	GR
2nd place, silver medalist(s)	Milán Matos	Cuba	7.34	7.77	7.14	7.55	7.53	x	7.77	
3rd place, bronze medalist(s)	Ron Chambers	Jamaica	7.47	7.77	7.07	7.46	x	7.35	7.77	
4	Steve Hanna	Bahamas	x	x	7.45	x	7.72	x	7.72	
5	Wilfredo Almonte	Dominican Republic	x	6.55	7.00	x	7.65	5.43	7.65	
6	Salomón Rowe	Guatemala	7.61	x	7.26	x	7.58	7.44	7.61	
7	Edsel Trompet	Netherlands Antilles	7.12	x	7.28	7.22	7.41	6.83	7.41	
8	Rasfael Rosario	Dominican Republic	6.95	6.90	6.60	6.81	6.86	x	6.95	
9	Ray Quiñones	Puerto Rico	x	x	6.85				6.85	
10	Carlos Acosta	Puerto Rico	x	6.78	–				6.78	
11	Peter Pratt	Bahamas	x	x	6.62				6.62	
	Joel Boetitus	Suriname	x	–	–				NM	

=== Triple jump ===
20 July

Rank	Name	Nationality	#1	#2	#3	#4	#5	#6	Result	Notes
1st place, gold medalist(s)	Steve Hanna	Bahamas	15.57	15.88	16.14	16.21	16.39	16.60	16.60	GR
2nd place, silver medalist(s)	Juan Velázquez	Cuba	15.31	16.43	x	15.87	15.99	16.20	16.43	
3rd place, bronze medalist(s)	Alejandro Herrera	Cuba	15.66	15.78	15.83	15.95	16.10	14.59	16.10	
4	Edgar Moreno	Venezuela	x	15.22	15.41	x	x	15.74	15.74	
5	Ronald Chambers	Jamaica	15.42	x	15.35	x	x	x	15.42	
6	Wilfredo Almonte	Dominican Republic	14.98	14.80	15.25	x	x	x	15.25	
7	Henry Inniss	Barbados	x	x	15.07	14.81	x	x	15.07	
8	Salomón Rowe	Guatemala	x	x	14.91	x	14.65	x	14.91	
9	Leighton Linton	Jamaica	14.47	14.79	14.64				14.79	
10	Peter Pratt	Bahamas	x	13.88	14.51				14.51	
	Ray Quiñones	Puerto Rico							DNS	

=== Shot put ===
16 July

Rank	Name	Nationality	#1	#2	#3	#4	#5	#6	Result	Notes
1st place, gold medalist(s)	Humberto Calvario	Cuba	16.61	16.42	17.51	16.91	16.93	17.16	17.51	GR
2nd place, silver medalist(s)	Nicolás Hernández	Cuba	17.07	x	17.36	x	x	16.79	17.36	
3rd place, bronze medalist(s)	Jesús Ramos	Venezuela	16.25	16.83	16.03	x	16.17	x	16.83	
4	José Carreño	Venezuela	x	15.87	x	16.13	15.77	16.42	16.42	
5	Pedro Serrano	Puerto Rico	15.56	x	15.89	15.77	15.20	16.10	16.10	
6	Hubert Maingot	Trinidad and Tobago	x	x	15.14	14.78	x	16.00	16.00	
6	Modesto Barreto	Colombia	14.63	15.69	x	14.47	x	14.84	15.69	
7	Bradley Cooper	Bahamas	14.76	x	x	x	14.10	15.32	15.32	
8	Iván Turcios	Nicaragua	14.43	14.36	x	x	–	–	14.43	
9	Wilfredo Burgos	Suriname	13.73	14.24	13.75				14.24	

=== Discus throw ===
16 July

Rank	Name	Nationality	#1	#2	#3	#4	#5	#6	Result	Notes
1st place, gold medalist(s)	Luis Delís	Cuba	56.94	51.66	58.62	57.72	56.50	56.72	58.62	GR
2nd place, silver medalist(s)	Julián Morrinson	Cuba	54.92	x	x	58.56	x	57.38	58.56	
3rd place, bronze medalist(s)	Bradley Cooper	Bahamas	52.26	54.24	42.24	53.64	46.02	50.56	54.24	
4	Modesto Barreto	Colombia	50.50	x	49.48	x	x	49.04	50.50	
5	Luis Palacios	Venezuela	x	44.68	46.74	41.96	x	46.56	46.74	
6	Desiderio Lebrón	Dominican Republic	x	x	42.26	x	44.62	46.72	46.72	
7	Iván Turcios	Nicaragua	42.40	43.76	41.98	43.06	43.22	40.92	43.76	
8	Wilfredo Burgos	Suriname	41.98	39.02	37.56	37.70	41.26	37.78	41.98	

=== Hammer throw ===
19 July

Rank	Name	Nationality	#1	#2	#3	#4	#5	#6	Result	Notes
1st place, gold medalist(s)	Armando Orozco	Cuba	69.86	x	64.12	68.00	69.74	x	69.86	GR
2nd place, silver medalist(s)	Genovevo Morejón	Cuba	66.66	68.00	67.58	68.02	67.46	69.14	69.14	
3rd place, bronze medalist(s)	Luis Martínez	Puerto Rico	56.22	48.98	55.92	54.60	54.84	53.68	56.22	
4	Andrés Polemil	Dominican Republic	52.20	x	49.34	49.68	x	x	52.20	
5	Orlando Ortega	Nicaragua	x	x	46.94	x	45.04	46.50	46.94	

=== Javelin throw ===
20 July – Old model

Rank	Name	Nationality	#1	#2	#3	#4	#5	#6	Result	Notes
1st place, gold medalist(s)	Antonio González	Cuba	70.92	73.84	73.78	x	78.74	x	78.74	GR
2nd place, silver medalist(s)	Amado Morales	Puerto Rico	70.54	69.90	x	64.84	70.08	57.74	70.54	
3rd place, bronze medalist(s)	Reinaldo Patterson	Cuba	x	60.46	x	x	63.64	x	63.64	
4	Hugo Downes	Barbados	62.74	62.68	63.60	62.70	62.68	59.26	63.60	
5	Godfrey Hinds	Barbados	x	55.52	54.70	60.10	62.16	x	62.16	
6	Paul Tujeechut	Netherlands Antilles	55.12	51.48	57.40	x	56.92	55.90	57.40	
7	Juan Cortés	Nicaragua	53.18	53.86	53.30	48.56	x	x	53.86	
	Rudy Aguillar	El Salvador							DNS	
	Doel Bonilla	Puerto Rico							DNS	

=== Decathlon ===
16–17 July

The highest mark recorded in each event is highlighted in yellow

Rank	Athlete	Nationality	100m	LJ	SP	HJ	400m	110m H	DT	PV	JT	1500m	Points	Notes
1st place, gold medalist(s)	Rigoberto Salazar	Cuba	11.02	7.37	15.14	1.95	50.81	14.91	42.32	3.80	62.48	5:26.41	7485	GR
2nd place, silver medalist(s)	Miguel Subarnaba	Cuba	10.90	6.58	13.88	1.95	51.48	16.57	38.76	4.00	54.26	5:28.76	6953	
3rd place, bronze medalist(s)	José Montezuma	Venezuela	11.43	6.47	12.00	1.85	49.78	16.09	43.44	3.60	53.66	4:57.80	6842	
4	Doel Bonilla	Puerto Rico	11.42	6.49	12.51	1.80	53.44	16.16	35.86	3.80	58.30	5:20.01	6529	
5	Juan Ríos	Venezuela	11.08	6.15	11.70	1.75	50.33	16.43	NM	4.20	50.44	4:56.69	6060	
	Rudy Aguillar	El Salvador	11.84	6.24	11.32	1.75	57.25	DNS	–	–	–	–	DNF	
	Roberto McFarlane	Costa Rica	11.11	6.46	DNS	–	–	–	–	–	–	–	DNF	

== Women's results ==
=== 100 metres ===
Heats – 15 July

Rank	Heat	Name	Nationality	Time	Notes
1	1	Leleith Hodges	Jamaica	11.43	Q, GR
2	1	Janice Bernard	Trinidad and Tobago	11.66	Q
1	2	Isabel Taylor	Cuba	11.35	Q, GR
1	3	Silvia Chivás	Cuba	11.17	Q, GR

Semifinals – 16 July

Rank	Heat	Name	Nationality	Time	Notes
1	?	Silvia Chivás	Cuba	11.14	Q, GR

Final – 16 July

Rank	Lane	Name	Nationality	Time	Notes
1st place, gold medalist(s)	1	Silvia Chivás	Cuba	11.47	
2nd place, silver medalist(s)	3	Leleith Hodges	Jamaica	11.63	
3rd place, bronze medalist(s)	6	Isabel Taylor	Cuba	11.74	
4	5	Janice Bernard	Trinidad and Tobago	11.94	
5	2	June Caddle	Barbados	12.19	

=== 200 metres ===
Final – 18 July

Rank	Lane	Name	Nationality	Time	Notes
1st place, gold medalist(s)	6	Silvia Chivás	Cuba	23.01	GR
2nd place, silver medalist(s)	2	Janice Bernard	Trinidad and Tobago	24.01	
3rd place, bronze medalist(s)	4	Maureen Gottshalk	Jamaica	24.42	
4	3	Martha Meléndez	Colombia	24.63	
5	1	Darcey Bryan	Costa Rica	24.92	
	5	Asunción Acosta	Cuba	?	

=== 400 metres ===
Heats – 15 July

Rank	Heat	Name	Nationality	Time	Notes
1	1	Aurelia Pentón	Cuba	52.99	Q
2	1	Helen Blake	Jamaica	53.20	Q
1	2	Beatriz Castillo	Cuba	54.26	Q
2	2	Ruth Simpson	Jamaica	55.63	Q
3	2	Vilma Paris	Puerto Rico	55.86	Q

Final – 16 July

Rank	Lane	Name	Nationality	Time	Notes
1st place, gold medalist(s)	1	Aurelia Pentón	Cuba	50.56	GR
2nd place, silver medalist(s)	2	Beatriz Castillo	Cuba	51.27	
3rd place, bronze medalist(s)	6	Helen Blake	Jamaica	53.40	
4	5	Vilma Paris	Puerto Rico	55.20	
5	4	Ruth Simpson	Jamaica	55.22	
6	3	Raquel Downs	Nicaragua	56.60	

=== 800 metres ===
Heats – ? July

Rank	Heat	Name	Nationality	Time	Notes
2	1	Ileana Hocking	Puerto Rico	2:11.48	Q
3	2	Angelita Lind	Puerto Rico	2:13.93	

Final – 18 July

Rank	Lane	Name	Nationality	Time	Notes
1st place, gold medalist(s)	4	Aurelia Pentón	Cuba	2:01.38	GR
2nd place, silver medalist(s)	5	Charlotte Bradley	Mexico	2:03.58	
3rd place, bronze medalist(s)	1	Nery McKeen	Cuba	2:04.48	
4	2	Helen Blake	Jamaica	2:09.37	
5	3	Ileana Hocking	Puerto Rico	2:09.65	
6	6	Adriana Marchena	Venezuela	2:12.51	

=== 1500 metres ===
18 July

Rank	Name	Nationality	Time	Notes
1st place, gold medalist(s)	Charlotte Bradley	Mexico	4:30.78	GR
2nd place, silver medalist(s)	Ileana Hocking	Puerto Rico	4:35.88	
3rd place, bronze medalist(s)	Susana Herrera	Mexico	4:39.62	
4	Melquises Fonseca	Cuba	4:43.75	
5	Yamile Medina	Colombia	4:45.02	
6	Thelma Zúñiga	Costa Rica	4:45.52	
7	Leonor Suárez	Colombia	4:56.20	
8	Violeta Larrauri	Dominican Republic	5:13.56	
9	Norma Franco	El Salvador	NT	
10	Angelita Lind	Puerto Rico	NT	
11	Herminia García	Dominican Republic	NT	

=== 100 metres hurdles ===
Final – 18 July

Rank	Lane	Name	Nationality	Time	Notes
1st place, gold medalist(s)	3	Grisel Machado	Cuba	13.31	GR
2nd place, silver medalist(s)	6	Marisela Peralta	Dominican Republic	14.23	
3rd place, bronze medalist(s)	1	Carmen Zamora	Cuba	14.29	
4	2	Vilma Paris	Puerto Rico	14.34	
5	4	June Caddle	Barbados	14.50	
	5	Doreen Small	Jamaica	?	

=== 4 × 100 metres relay ===
20 July

Rank	Lane	Team	Name	Time	Notes
1st place, gold medalist(s)	1	Cuba	Grisel Machado, Silvia Chivás, Carmen Valdés, Isabel Taylor	44.37	GR
2nd place, silver medalist(s)	4	Jamaica	Leleith Hodges, Dorothy Scott, Maureen Gottschalk, Jacqueline Pusey	44.41	
3rd place, bronze medalist(s)	5	Trinidad and Tobago	Rebeca Roberts, Joane Gardner, Janice Bernard, Esther Hope	45.13	
4	2	Dominican Republic	Felicia Candelario, Miriam Sánchez, Divina Estrella, Teresa Almanzar	46.30	
	3	Costa Rica	Darcey Bryan, Ana Baylis, Aracelly Arias, Lorelly Trejos	DQ	FS

=== 4 × 400 metres relay ===
20 July

Rank	Lane	Team	Name	Time	Notes
1st place, gold medalist(s)	4	Cuba	Ana Guibert, Ana Fidelia Quirot, Beatriz Castillo, Aurelia Pentón	3:31.34	GR
2nd place, silver medalist(s)	1	Jamaica	Ruth Simpson, Norma Lee, Maureen Gottschalk, Helen Blake	3:41.69	
3rd place, bronze medalist(s)	2	Puerto Rico	Angelita Lind, Ileana Hocking, Madeline de Jesús, Vilma Paris	3:46.58	
4	3	Dominican Republic	Divina Estrella, Belkis Mañón, Felicia Candelario, Ana Hostesse	3:53.37	

=== High jump ===
16 July

Rank	Name	Nationality	1.50	1.55	1.60	1.65	1.70	1.75	1.80	Result	Notes
1st place, gold medalist(s)	Ángela Carbonell	Cuba	–	–	–	–	o	o	xxx	1.75	GR
2nd place, silver medalist(s)	Grace Jackson	Jamaica	–	–	o	o	o	xxx		1.70	
3rd place, bronze medalist(s)	Elisa Ávila	Mexico	–	o	o	o	xxx			1.65	
4	Lucía Duquet	Cuba	–	o	xo	o	xxx			1.65	
5	Ana Hidalgo	Puerto Rico	o	o	xo	xxx				1.60	

=== Long jump ===
16 July

Rank	Name	Nationality	#1	#2	#3	#4	#5	#6	Result	Notes
1st place, gold medalist(s)	Shonel Ferguson	Bahamas	x	5.84	6.16	6.41	x	x	6.41	
2nd place, silver medalist(s)	Ana Alexander	Cuba	5.86	5.96	6.25	5.96	6.12	6.25	6.25	
3rd place, bronze medalist(s)	Eloína Echevarría	Cuba	x	6.12	x	x	5.92	6.08	6.12	
4	Yolanda Romero	Mexico	5.31	5.47	5.55	5.77	5.64	5.62	5.77	
5	Sharol Henry	Jamaica	x	x	5.76	3.03	5.45	5.74	5.76	
6	Madeline de Jesús	Puerto Rico	5.49	5.70	5.68	5.74	5.54	x	5.74	
7	Laura Vásquez	Mexico	x	5.46	5.67	x	5.57	x	5.67	
8	Jennifer Swanston	Barbados	5.44	5.54	5.44	5.52	5.51	5.46	5.54	

=== Shot put ===
19 July

Rank	Name	Nationality	#1	#2	#3	#4	#5	#6	Result	Notes
1st place, gold medalist(s)	Hilda Ramírez	Cuba	17.00	16.91	x	x	16.36	16.64	17.00	GR
2nd place, silver medalist(s)	Marcelina Rodríguez	Cuba	x	14.84	14.97	x	14.95	14.95	14.97	
3rd place, bronze medalist(s)	Vicky López	Puerto Rico	12.66	13.40	12.92	12.90	13.42	13.02	13.42	
4	Patricia Andrews	Venezuela	11.96	12.93	13.15	13.18	13.22	12.97	13.22	
5	Magdalena Gómez	Colombia	x	13.11	12.88	13.18	12.71	13.05	13.18	
6	Lynette Antoinne	Bahamas	x	13.08	13.04	12.91	x	12.70	13.08	
7	Orlanda Lynch	Suriname	11.04	11.17	11.04	11.62	11.34	12.02	12.02	
	Ibelisse Echeverry	Puerto Rico							DNS	

=== Discus throw ===
15 July

Rank	Name	Nationality	#1	#2	#3	#4	#5	#6	Result	Notes
1st place, gold medalist(s)	Carmen Romero	Cuba	x	57.94	x	60.54	x	x	60.54	GR
2nd place, silver medalist(s)	María Cristina Betancourt	Cuba	x	55.84	56.84	57.58	x	x	57.58	
3rd place, bronze medalist(s)	Selene Saldarriaga	Colombia	x	41.28	39.50	40.10	x	x	41.28	
4	Beryl Bethel	Bahamas	x	35.85	38.08	33.58	39.88	38.58	39.88	
5	Elena Cajigas	Puerto Rico	37.04	36.98	37.78	38.40	x	38.94	38.94	
6	Orlanda Lynch	Suriname	35.64	34.76	35.06	36.00	x	x	36.00	
	Lynette Antoinne	Bahamas							DNS	
	Patricia Andrews	Venezuela							DNS	

=== Javelin throw ===
20 July – Old model

Rank	Name	Nationality	#1	#2	#3	#4	#5	#6	Result	Notes
1st place, gold medalist(s)	María Caridad Colón	Cuba	59.22	63.40	57.80	61.40	60.04	53.94	63.40	GR
2nd place, silver medalist(s)	María Beltrán	Cuba	x	53.54	48.34	52.04	54.86	x	54.86	
3rd place, bronze medalist(s)	Guadalupe López	Mexico	49.80	47.12	46.40	49.52	47.74	x	49.80	
4	María López	Puerto Rico	43.76	47.32	x	x	43.76	x	47.32	
5	Diana Rodríguez	Puerto Rico	44.96	x	42.08	x	46.48	46.44	46.48	
6	Ivelisse Gómez	Dominican Republic	40.58	x	43.12	40.38	x	39.72	43.12	
7	Marta Velásquez	Nicaragua	34.30	35.54	33.54	36.52	x	x	36.52	
8	Beryl Bethel	Bahamas	31.28	36.10	x	x	x	36.36	36.36	

=== Pentathlon ===
19–20 July

The highest mark recorded in each event is highlighted in yellow

Rank	Name	Nationality	100m H	SP	HJ	LJ	800m	Points	Notes
1st place, gold medalist(s)	Elida Aveillé	Cuba	15.04	11.49	1.60	5.47	2:38.46	3636	
2nd place, silver medalist(s)	Alix Castillo	Venezuela	14.98	10.18	1.55	5.45	2:26.49	3625	
3rd place, bronze medalist(s)	Laura Vázquez	Mexico	14.60	8.32	1.55	5.36	2:27.09	3511	
4	Jennifer Swanston	Barbados	14.54	10.15	1.55	5.61	2:34.10	3422	
5	Marisela Peralta	Dominican Republic	14.37	10.54	1.60	5.08	2:54.13	3419	
	Lucía Duquet	Cuba	17.12	11.44	1.66	5.05	DNS	DNF	
