= Peter Hoffmann (runner) =

British

Personal information
- Nationality: British (Scottish)
- Born: 1 July 1956 (age 70) Scotland

Sport
- Sport: Athletics
- Event: 400m
- Club: Edinburgh AC
Medal record
Representing Great Britain
Athletics
European Athletics Junior Championships
Silver medal – second place	1975 Athens	400 metres

Peter Roderick William Hoffmann (born 1 July 1956) is an Edinburgh author and former international sportsman.

== Early life and education ==
Born in Edinburgh, Peter Hoffmann was brought up in Oxgangs, Edinburgh and educated at Hunters Tryst Primary School and Boroughmuir High School. His mother attended the University of Edinburgh in 1954, and his father was a chief officer in the merchant navy who trained at the Edinburgh shipping company, Ben Line Agencies. In 1976 Hoffmann began studying for a degree in English and sports science and recreation management at Loughborough University but decided to leave shortly after starting the course. He instead graduated from Edinburgh Napier University with a BA in Business Studies (1981) and Dunfermline College of Physical Education with a postgraduate Diploma Recreation and Leisure Practice (1983).

== Career ==
For 25 years Hoffmann worked in the field of education, culture and sport in Midlothian and the Highlands, and for more than 10 years at chief officer level. He has written occasional articles for The Scotsman and Lothian Life.

He has written books on Edinburgh, sport and social history as well as biography and a fictional love story set in Edinburgh between the years 1960 and 1963.

OXGANGS - A Capital Tale volumes 1 and 2 documents the daily life, family dynamics, and the physical building of the estate. It is the authority on how the community evolved from a newly built 1950s public housing estate into a bustling Edinburgh suburb, Peter Hoffmann’s deep-dive chronicle is the gold standard. The books describe what life was like for a boy growing up in 1960s Oxgangs on a council housing estate in the lea of the Pentland Hills. It is regarded as the author’s signature work, his magnum opus. It specifically zooms in on the stair culture at 6 Oxgangs Avenue telling the everyday story of the 16 adults and 25 children who lived there between the years 1958 and 1972 as told through a series of over 200 vignettes with many illustrations and photographs, the books paint a picture of one family living alongside seven other families in an atypical Edinburgh council stair capturing the day-to-day life of the period as seen through the eyes of not just the author, but also through the eyes of many others who lived in Oxgangs too. As a genre of social history it focuses on a highly specific aspect and area of memory, place and research to reveal larger universal truths - a local story but one with universal themes of growing up too.

In the four volume On This Oxgangs Day series which covers the four seasons of the year, Autumn, Winter, Spring and Summer, each day of the 'year' features a corresponding Oxgangs based diary extract from Hoffmann's journals from between the years 1971 and 2021, covering half a century. The diaries begin when he is a 14 year old scholboy through to the author being a retired old man.

He is also the author of the hexalogy of six athletics-based books, A Life In A Day In A Year: A Postcard From Meadowbank, 1973-1978 (2017); Festina Lente - A Practical Philosophy of 800 Metres Running (2018); The True Confessions Of Retep Nnamffoh: School's Out For Ever, A 1973 Edinburgh Young Athlete's Diary (2018); The Way We Were (2020); Audacity and Idiocy – A Scottish Athlete's 1978 Commonwealth Games Journal (2022) and Running through the Years: Janus and the View from Deep-midwinter (2024). A Life In A Day In A Year: A Postcard From Meadowbank, 1973-1978 (2017) captures the Scottish athletics scene of the 1970s featuring such athletes as Roger Jenkins (banker) David Jenkins (sprinter) and Paul Forbes encapsulating the social culture of the Edinburgh era of the 1970s.

In 2021 Hoffmann authored the book Two Worlds telling the remarkable story of (Dr.) Arthur Philip Motley a Black American who as a young man left his home in McAlester City Oklahoma in 1928 to travel the 4351 miles across America and the Atlantic Ocean to come to Edinburgh Scotland to fulfil his dream to become a doctor going on to become a legendary figure in the community of Oxgangs.

Through their diaries, The Letts’ Schoolboys follows, tracks and contrasts the daily lives of five fellow British schoolboy diarists - T.G. Richards aged 15 in 1918 from Swansea Wales; English schoolboys G.D.B. (Gordon) Goodall from Worcester aged 14 at the beginning of 1930; Kenneth Holder aged 14 in 1935 from Woking; Derek Foster, aged 15 in 1940 who lives in Harrow but attends Dulwich College London during school-term; and their Scottish compatriot from across the years and the decades and the border, Peter Hoffmann, aged 14 in 1971, who attends Edinburgh's Boroughmuir Senior Secondary School. Covering a period of over half a century the book follows their day-to-day lives in their own words including Spanish Flu, Test Matches, Churchill's most famous speech, the German-France Armistice and even a World War 1 baseball match held in Swansea between Canada and the USA.

In 2024 Hoffmann edited the 1934 Edinburgh schoolgirl diary of former The Mary Erskine School pupil Patricia Oram.

In his 70th year, writing under the moniker James Boswell, Hoffmann is working on a series of town and country dweller memoirs (Edinburgh and the Highlands) 'Whispers from the Close Echoes from the Glen - A Memoir of Scots Sorts and Sensations', the first of which, has been published.

He is also the author of The Morningside Station Mysteries a series set in early 1970s Edinburgh, featuring Morningside judge, Lord Scott, Senator of the College of Justice, former Lord Advocate who had spent decades listening to respectable men tell plausible lies; Spector Bucket Private Detective who had once played wing forward for Hearts before a bad knee ended his playing days and left him with a rolling limp and a keen eye for trouble; Dr. Forbes MacGregor who lived a double intellectual life—though both halves sprang from the same root, by profession, he was a partner at Drayton & Mackenzie, his family’s long-established legal firm at 58 Charlotte Square, handling trusts, estates, and property conveyancing with the methodical patience expected of a Writer to the Signet, by vocation, however, he was a church historian and a member of Charlotte Baptist Chapel just round the corner on Rose Street; and young Peter Hoffmann from Oxgangs, Morningside paperboy, occasional Boroughmuir schoolboy when the notion takes him and aspiring athlete.

== Sporting career ==
He had an unusually wide athletics range winning championships at both sprints and middle distance including the 1974 and 1975 Scottish junior 50 metres indoor sprint; the 1975 British (AAA) junior 400 metres indoors; as well as the 1978 men's British (AAA) 800 metres. Between 1974 and 1978 Hoffmann, a member of the Edinburgh AC, made fourteen international appearances for Scotland at 400, 800 and 4 x 400 metres relay. He was a British Junior International in 1974 and 1975 at 400 meters and 4 x 400 metres and between 1975 and 1978 also represented Great Britain at 400, 800 and 4 x 400 metres. In 1978 he was a Great Britain internationalist indoors over 800 metres. Representing Great Britain at the 1975 European Junior Championships he won a silver medal in the 400 metres. He was a member of the British Olympic 4 x 400 metres relay squad at Montreal, 1976.

In 1975 Hoffmann could be considered the best all round junior runner in the United Kingdom. During the season he had beaten Drew McMaster over 100 metres; medalled indoors and outdoors in the AAAs Junior Championships 200 metres; was the number two ranked 400 metres athlete in Europe; broke the UK Junior indoor 600 metre record; ran the second fastest indoor UK 800 metres and 400 metres hurdles.

In 1978 he represented the Scottish team at the 1978 Commonwealth Games in Edmonton, Canada, participating in the 800 metres and 4 x 400 metres relay events.

Between 1973 and 1978 Hoffmann won 10 Scottish titles at Youth, Junior and Senior level; broke the Scottish Native 400 metres record on 3 occasions and won 7 AAAs medals at 200, 400 and 800 metres. He partnered Sebastian Coe and Steve Ovett as the UK's third representative at the 1978 European Athletics Championships Men's 800 metres in Prague. In addition to winning AAA's titles at 400 and 800 metres Hoffmann took the silver medal behind Coe at the 1978 UK Athletics Championships.

In 2016 he represented Scotland at the 4 Nations Home Fencing Veterans’ International at épée.

== Personal life ==
He lives in the Highlands and is married with two sons, Will and Tom; the latter is an international epeeist and was part of the successful Scotland team which won the bronze medal at the 2014 Commonwealth Fencing Championships and the 2018 Commonwealth Fencing Championships. With the closure of Meadowbank Stadium Hoffmann founded the Memory Hold The Door-Meadowbank Sports Centre legacy project allowing people from throughout the world to record their memories, stories, experiences, photographs and other memorabilia of the facility. In 2018 he also launched a similar project Oxgangs - A Pastime From Time Past - Spirits Across The Air which has been edited into a book on the local community. Hoffmann made a cameo appearance in the film Chariots Of Fire in the scene featuring the Scotland v Ireland international.

== Books ==
- 2012: The Stair An Oxgangs Edinburgh Childhood 1958-1972: Summer Has Gone ISBN 978-1494874131
- 2016: The Secret Diary of Retep Nnamffoh aged Fourteen and a Half!: An Edinburgh Schoolboy's 1971 Diary ISBN 978-1977723895
- 2016: A 1960s Edinburgh Christmas ISBN 978-1539997450
- 2017: In The Season Of The Year: A Celebration Of 1960s Edinburgh ISBN 978-1976318597
- 2017: A Life In A Day In A Year: A Postcard From Meadowbank, 1973-1978 ISBN 979-8491463244
- 2018: A 1972 Edinburgh Teenager's Diary: The Growing Pains Of Retep Nnamffoh Aged 15 And A Half ISBN 978-1985709850
- 2018: A Practical Philosophy of 800 Metres Running: Festina Lente ISBN 978-1986928793
- 2018: The True Confessions Of Retep Nnamffoh: School's Out For Ever, A 1973 Edinburgh Young Athlete's Diary ISBN 978-1719599085
- 2018: Oxgangs - A Pastime From Time Past: Spirits Across The Air ISBN 978-1725718630
- 2019: The Peripatetic Philosopher - An Edinburgh Teenager's Diary 1971-1973 ISBN 978-1688026629
- 2019: Paradise Lost - The Edinburgh Oxgangs School Summer Holidays 1958-1972 ISBN 978-1089483045
- 2020: OXGANGS A Capital Tale Volume 1 ISBN 979-8418781314
- 2020: OXGANGS A Capital Tale Volume 2 ISBN 979-8419178540
- 2020: The Way We Were ASIN B084WJL7G3
- 2021: You Can Run But You Can't Outrun Yourself: A 1950s Edinburgh Love Story ISBN 979-8757438696
- 2021: Two Worlds The Story Of An Edinburgh Doctor ISBN 979-8481599687
- 2022: Audacity and Idiocy: A Scottish Athlete's 1978 Commonwealth Games Journal ISBN 979-8433036925
- 2022: The Letts' Schoolboys ISBN 979-8815797000
- 2023: On This Oxgangs Day 1971-2021 Volume 1 Autumn ISBN 979-8871162620
- 2024: On This Oxgangs Day 1971-2021 Volume 2 Winter ISBN 979-8883075970
- 2024: On This Oxgangs Day 1971-2021 Volume 3 Spring ISBN 979-8326805201
- 2024: On This Oxgangs Day 1971-2021 Volume 4 Summer ISBN 979-8336800951
- 2024: In the Season of the Year An Oxgangs Diary 1971-2021 ISBN 979-8337739670
- 2024: A Capital Diary Edinburgh 1971-1996 ISBN 979-8325228940
- 2024: A Capital Diary Volume 2 Edinburgh 1971-1996 ISBN 979-8488562769
- 2024: Tony and Maria A Capital Love Story ISBN 979-8322986386
- 2024: Edinburgh Christmas Chronicles 1971-1996 ISBN 979-8324725921
- 2024: The Story of a Quarrel An Edinburgh Schoolgirl's 1934 Diary ISBN 979-8340131065
- 2024: Running through the Years: Janus and the View from Deep-midwinter ISBN 979-8302273420
- 2026: Whispers from the Close Echoes from the Glen A Memoir of Scots Sorts and Sensations - January ISBN 979-8249548322
- 2026 An American Life The Diaries of Ruth Lewis-Randall 1930-1966: Volume One, 1930 I'm so happy nowadays! Just 'cause I'm alive! ISBN 979-8188157814
- 2026: James Boswell A Town and Country Dweller’s Memoir: Volume One Edinburgh 1956-1976 ISBN 979-8160274249
- 2026: James Boswell A Town and Country Dweller’s Memoir: Volume Two Edinburgh 1977-1996 ISBN 979-8161835135
- 2026: The Comiston Trust Disappearance (The Morningside Station Mysteries) ISBN 979-8143779501

== See also ==
- 1975 European Athletics Junior Championships
- 1978 European Athletics Championships – Men's 800 metres
- Athletics at the 1978 Commonwealth Games – Men's 800 metres
- 1978 UK Athletics Championships
