= Athletics at the 1979 Pan American Games – Men's 200 metres =

Men's 200 metres at the 1979 Pan American Games
- Venue: Estadio Sixto Escobar
- Dates: 9 & 10 July
- Winning time: 20.37

Medalists
Gold medal	Silvio Leonard	Cuba
Silver medal	James Gilkes	Guyana
Bronze medal	Don Coleman	United States

The men's 200 metres sprint competition of the athletics events at the 1979 Pan American Games took place on 9 and 10 July at the Estadio Sixto Escobar. The defending Pan American Games champion was James Gilkes of Guyana.

== Records ==
Prior to this competition, the existing world and Pan American Games records were as follows:

World record	Tommie Smith (USA)	19.83	Mexico City, Mexico	October 16, 1968
Pan American Games record	Don Quarrie (JAM)	19.8	Cali, Colombia	1971

== Results ==
All times shown are in seconds.

KEY:	WR	World Record	GR	Pan American Record

=== Heats ===
Held on 9 July

Wind:
Heat 1: +2.8 m/s, Heat 2: +1.1 m/s, Heat 3: +0.1 m/s

Rank	Heat	Name	Nationality	Time	Notes
1	1	Silvio Leonard	Cuba	20.63	Q
2	1	Don Coleman	United States	20.63	Q
3	1	Altevir de Araújo	Brazil	20.69	Q
4	2	James Gilkes	Guyana	20.84	Q
5	3	Floyd Brown	Jamaica	20.87	Q
6	1	Desai Williams	Canada	20.90	Q
7	3	Dwayne Evans	United States	20.93	Q
8	2	Rudy Levarity	Bahamas	21.06	Q
9	1	Jesús Cabrera	Puerto Rico	21.16	q
10	1	Rawle Clarke	Barbados	21.25	q
11	3	Osvaldo Lara	Cuba	21.26	Q
12	2	Rafael Félix	Dominican Republic	21.38	Q
13	2	Tony Sharpe	Canada	21.39	Q
14	2	Michael Barnes	Jamaica	21.54	q
15	3	Michael Paul	Trinidad and Tobago	21.56	Q
16	3	Randolph Wheatley	Virgin Islands	21.68	q
17	1	Luis Schneider	Chile	21.85	
18	2	David Phillips	Barbados	22.36	
19	1	Guy Abrahams	Panama	22.50	
	2	Ronald Russell	Virgin Islands	DNS	
	3	Rui da Silva	Brazil	DNS	
	3	Florencio Aguilar	Panama	DNS	

=== Semifinals ===
Held on 9 July

Wind:
Heat 1: +1.1 m/s, Heat 2: +2.5 m/s

Rank	Heat	Name	Nationality	Time	Notes
1	2	Don Coleman	United States	20.45	Q
2	1	James Gilkes	Guyana	20.46	Q
3	1	Silvio Leonard	Cuba	20.65	Q
4	2	Desai Williams	Canada	20.75	Q
5	2	Osvaldo Lara	Cuba	20.78	Q
6	1	Floyd Brown	Jamaica	20.83	Q
7	2	Altevir de Araújo	Brazil	20.86	q
8	2	Rudy Levarity	Bahamas	20.89	q
9	1	Dwayne Evans	United States	21.00	
10	2	Michael Paul	Trinidad and Tobago	21.11	
11	2	Jesús Cabrera	Puerto Rico	21.21	
12	2	Michael Barnes	Jamaica	21.24	
13	1	Tony Sharpe	Canada	21.33	
14	1	Rafael Félix	Dominican Republic	21.40	
15	1	Rawle Clarke	Barbados	21.43	
16	1	Randolph Wheatley	Virgin Islands	21.47	

=== Final ===
Held on 11 July

Wind: +3.9 m/s

Rank	Name	Nationality	Time	Notes
1st place, gold medalist(s)	Silvio Leonard	Cuba	20.37	
2nd place, silver medalist(s)	James Gilkes	Guyana	20.46	
3rd place, bronze medalist(s)	Don Coleman	United States	20.56	
4	Altevir de Araújo	Brazil	20.60	
5	Floyd Brown	Jamaica	20.74	
6	Desai Williams	Canada	20.98	
7	Osvaldo Lara	Cuba	21.00	
8	Rudy Levarity	Bahamas	21.08	
