= Taillon (surname) =

Taillon is a surname. Notable people with the surname include:

- Daniel Taillon (born 1952), Canadian hurdler
- Gilles Taillon (born 1945), Canadian politician
- Jacinthe Taillon (born 1977), Canadian synchronized swimmer
- Jameson Taillon (born 1991), American baseball player
- Louis-Olivier Taillon (1840–1923), Canadian politician
