= Mike Solomon =

Trinidad and Tobago sprinter

Personal information
- Nationality: Trinidadian
- Born: September 29, 1954 (age 71) Port of Spain, Trinidad
- Height: 171 cm (5 ft 7 in)
- Weight: 60 kg (132 lb)

Sport
- Sport: Athletics
- Event: 400m
- Club: UNM Lobos

Michael Solomon (born September 29, 1954) is a retired sprinter from Trinidad and Tobago.

== Biography ==
Born in Port of Spain, Trinidad, Solomon later moved to the United States where he attended George W. Wingate High School and then the University of New Mexico. He specialized in the 600-yard run and won the Western Athletic Conference (WAC) championship in the discipline with a conference and school record mark in 1974 and 1975. He won the National Collegiate Athletic Association (NCAA) championship in the indoor 600-yard run in 1977 and was twice selected an All-American at New Mexico, having set some records at the school that remained decades later. He later won titles in the 600-yard run at the US championships in 1979 and 1981.

Internationally, Solomon represented his native country at the 1976 Summer Olympics and competed in the 400 metres and 4 x 400 metres relay, reaching the semifinals in the former while helping his team place sixth in the latter. He competed at the 1978 Central American and Caribbean Games and won the silver medal in the 4 x 400 metres relay. He also competed in two events at the 1978 Commonwealth Games and in two events at the 1979 Pan American Games. He made a return to the Summer Olympics in 1980 and placed sixth in both the 400 metres and the 4 x 400 metres relay. He later reached the 400 metres semifinal at the 1983 World Championships.

Solomon finished third behind Tom Andrews in the 400 metres event at the British 1977 AAA Championships.

Solomon's son, Jarrin Solomon, also became a sprinter and won an Olympic medal.

== International competitions ==
Year	Competition	Venue	Position	Event	Notes
Representing Trinidad and Tobago
1976	Olympic Games	Montreal, Canada	12th (sf)	400 m	46.20
1976	Olympic Games	Montreal, Canada	6th	4 × 400 m relay	3:03.46
1978	Central American and Caribbean Games	Medellín, Colombia	2nd	4 × 400 m relay	3:05.01
1978	Commonwealth Games	Edmonton, Canada	4th	400 m	46.97
1978	Commonwealth Games	Edmonton, Canada	5th	4 × 400 m relay	3:06.73
1979	Pan American Games	San Juan, Puerto Rico	11th (sf)	400 m	46.91
1979	Pan American Games	San Juan, Puerto Rico	6th	4 × 400 m relay	3:11.6
1980	Olympic Games	Moscow, Soviet Union	6th	400 m	45.55
1980	Olympic Games	Moscow, Soviet Union	6th	4 × 400 m relay	3:06.6
1983	World Championships	Helsinki, Finland	15th (sf)	800 m	1:47.10
