= Athletics at the 1978 Commonwealth Games – Men's 800 metres =

Men's 800 metres at the Commonwealth Games

The men's 800 metres event at the 1978 Commonwealth Games was held on 8 and 10 August at the Commonwealth Stadium in Edmonton, Alberta, Canada.

== Medalists ==
Gold	Silver	Bronze
Mike Boit; Kenya	Seymour Newman; Jamaica	Peter Lemashon; Kenya

== Results ==
=== Heats ===
Held on 8 August

Qualification: First 3 in each heat (Q) and the next 4 fastest (q) qualify for the semifinals.

Rank	Heat	Name	Nationality	Time	Notes
1	2	John Higham	Australia	1:48.9	Q
2	2	Colin Szwed	England	1:49.1	Q
3	2	Peter Hoffmann	Scotland	1:49.1	Q
4	2	Glen Grant	Wales	1:49.3	q
5	3	James Maina Boi	Kenya	1:49.48	Q
6	3	Garry Cook	England	1:49.9	Q
7	3	Paul Forbes	Scotland	1:50.0	Q
8	2	Halidu Zinentah	Ghana	1:50.2	q
9	3	Rayfield Beaton	Guyana	1:50.3	q
10	2	Doug Wournell	Canada	1:50.4	q
11	4	Mike Boit	Kenya	1:50.6	Q
12	4	David Warren	England	1:51.4	Q
13	1	Chum Darvall	Australia	1:51.5	Q
13	4	Dennis Norris	New Zealand	1:51.5	Q
15	1	Peter Lemashon	Kenya	1:51.6	Q
15	1	Seymour Newman	Jamaica	1:51.6	Q
15	4	Peter Favell	Canada	1:51.56	
18	1	James McGuinness	Northern Ireland	1:51.71	
19	3	Conrad Francis	Grenada	1:52.22	
20	4	Donald Pierre	Grenada	1:52.61	
21	4	Ezzard Wilson	Saint Kitts and Nevis	1:52.66	
22	1	Carlsen Phillips	Bermuda	1:52.83	
23	1	Dave Hill	Canada	1:53.77	
24	2	Henry Carver	Mauritius	1:54.83	
25	3	William Amakye	Ghana	1:54.90	
26	1	Trevor Small	Barbados	1:55.24	
27	3	John Erysthee	Saint Lucia	1:58.43	
28	2	Heligar Calderon	Saint Lucia	2:01.08	
	3	Michael Watson	Bermuda	DQ	
	1	Michael Olliviere	Saint Vincent and the Grenadines	DNS	
	4	Lewis Swann	Turks and Caicos Islands	DNS	
	4	Auchinleck Spencer	Antigua and Barbuda	DNS	

=== Semifinals ===
Held on 8 August

Qualification: First 4 in each semifinal (Q) qualify directly for the final.

Rank	Heat	Name	Nationality	Time	Notes
1	1	Seymour Newman	Jamaica	1:48.83	Q
2	1	Glen Grant	Wales	1:49.25	Q
3	1	Chum Darvall	Australia	1:49.26	Q
4	2	Mike Boit	Kenya	1:49.88	Q
5	1	Peter Lemashon	Kenya	1:49.93	Q
6	1	Peter Hoffmann	Scotland	1:50.10	
7	2	Halidu Zinentah	Ghana	1:50.62	Q
8	2	Garry Cook	England	1:50.75	Q
9	2	John Higham	Australia	1:50.77	Q
10	2	Dennis Norris	New Zealand	1:50.77	
11	1	Colin Szwed	England	1:50.89	
12	1	Doug Wournell	Canada	1:51.23	
13	2	Rayfield Beaton	Guyana	1:51.86	
14	2	David Warren	England	1:51.96	
15	2	Paul Forbes	Scotland	1:56.80	
	1	James Maina Boi	Kenya	DQ	

=== Final ===
Held on 10 August

Rank	Name	Nationality	Time	Notes
1st place, gold medalist(s)	Mike Boit	Kenya	1:46.39	
2nd place, silver medalist(s)	Seymour Newman	Jamaica	1:47.30	
3rd place, bronze medalist(s)	Peter Lemashon	Kenya	1:47.57	
4	Chum Darvall	Australia	1:47.74	
5	Garry Cook	England	1:48.06	
6	Halidu Zinentah	Ghana	1:48.15	
7	John Higham	Australia	1:48.90	
8	Glen Grant	Wales	1:49.32	
