= 1972 CARIFTA Games =

I CARIFTA Games
- Dates: April 1–4
- Host city: Bridgetown, Barbados
- Level: Junior
- Events: 23
- Participation: more than 67 athletes from 11 nations

The 1st CARIFTA Games was held in Bridgetown, Barbados on April 1–4, 1972. An appraisal of the results was given on the 40th anniversary of the games.

== Participation (unofficial) ==
Detailed result lists can be found on the "World Junior Athletics History" website. There is almost no information on athletes competing in the relay teams. An unofficial count (without relay teams) shows roughly 67 athletes from 11 total countries: Barbados (12), Bermuda (5), Grenada (6), Guadeloupe (1), Guyana (8), Jamaica (20), Lesser Antilles (1 relay team), Saint Christopher-Nevis-Anguilla (3 relay teams), Saint Lucia (3 relay teams), Saint Vincent and the Grenadines (1 + 3 relay teams), Trinidad and Tobago (14).

== Medal summary ==
Medal winners are published by category: Boys under 20 (Junior), and Girls under 20 (Junior). Complete results can be found on the "World Junior Athletics History" website.

=== Boys under 20 (Junior) ===
Event	Gold		Silver		Bronze	
100 metres	Maurice Clarke (JAM)	10.7	W. Broom (JAM)	10.9	Calvin Dill (BER)	10.9
200 metres	Maurice Clarke (JAM)	21.2	Kelvin Joseph (TRI)	21.5	Calvin Dill (BER)	21.6
400 metres	Seymour Newman (JAM)	47.6	Horace Tuitt (TRI)	48.4	Charles Headlam (JAM)	48.5
800 metres	Horace Tuitt (TRI)	1:52.5	Trevor Campbell (JAM)	1:53.3	T. Bullock (JAM)	1:57.5
1500 metres	Gladstone Hopkinson (GUY)	4:00.0	Frederick Cyrus (BAR)	4:08.2	P. Bryan (JAM)	4:08.8
High jump	Clive Barriffe (JAM)	1.85	Clark Godwin (BER)	1.80	Valentine Adams (GRN)	1.80
Long jump	Donald Hale (JAM)	7.15	Glen Stanford (JAM)	7.02	Aubrey Wilson (GUY)	6.89
Triple jump	Donald Hale (JAM)	14.71	Wilfred Gonsales (BER)	13.82	Milton Gibbs (BAR)	13.78
Shot put	Leon Brown (JAM)	17.12	Eros Rapier (GRN)	13.21	Rawle Agard (BAR)	13.17
Discus throw	Leon Brown (JAM)	45.88	Jean Talma (TRI)	40.88	Michael Andrews (TRI)	36.96
Javelin throw	Eros Rapier (GRN)	57.60	Michael Andrews (TRI)	52.70	Joseph Cummings (GRN)	50.20
4 × 100 metres relay	Trinidad and Tobago; Cecil Mitchell; Herman Marchand; Richard Cross; Kelvin Joseph	41.8	Jamaica	42.1	Grenada; Ken Francois; Raymond Layne; Roy Layne; Russell Lambert	42.2
4 × 400 metres relay	Jamaica	3:16.3	Trinidad and Tobago; Michael Andrews; Roy Astor; Winston Mora-Scott; Horace Tuitt	3:18.3	Grenada; Ken Francois; Evelyn Maitland; Raymond Layne; Roy Layne	3:23.5

=== Girls under 20 (Junior) ===
Event	Gold		Silver		Bronze	
100 metres	Lelieth Hodges (JAM)	11.7	Debbie Byfield (JAM)	11.8	Roxanne Sills (GUY)	11.9
200 metres	Laura Pierre (TRI)	24.2	Debbie Byfield (JAM)	24.3	Regina Montague (JAM)	24.4
400 metres	Laura Pierre (TRI)	56.3	Barbara Bishop (BAR)	57.5	M. Panton (JAM)	59.6
800 metres	Carletta McNabb (JAM)	2:21.0	Heather Gooding (BAR)	2:23.7	A. Thompson (JAM)	2:25.0
High jump	Andrea Bruce (JAM)	1.78	Olympia Abrams (GUY)	1.52	Margaret Small (BAR)	1.52
Long jump	Andrea Bruce (JAM)	5.83	Joyce Darlington (BAR)	5.68	Faith Burrowes (JAM)	5.50
Shot put	Branwen Smith (BER)	9.75	Winsome Langley (JAM)	9.37	Juliette Russell (BAR)	9.36
Discus throw	Winsome Langley (JAM)	32.68	Mary Williams (TRI)	28.62	Faith Burrowes (JAM)	28.60
Javelin throw	Susan Thomas (BAR)	39.96	Juliette Russell (BAR)	27.08	Joy Renville (GUY)	26.36
4 × 100 metres relay	Jamaica	47.0	Barbados	47.8	Saint Vincent and the Grenadines	53.5

== Medal table (unofficial) ==
* Host nation (Barbados)

Rank	Nation	Gold	Silver	Bronze	Total
1	Jamaica (JAM)	15	7	8	30
2	Trinidad and Tobago (TTO)	4	6	1	11
3	Barbados (BAR)*	1	6	4	11
4	Bermuda (BER)	1	2	2	5
5	Grenada (GRN)	1	1	4	6
6	Guyana (GUY)	1	1	3	5
7	Guadeloupe (GLP)	0	0	1	1
7	Saint Vincent and the Grenadines (VIN)	0	0	1	1
Totals (8 entries)		23	23	24	70
