= Athletics at the 1979 Pan American Games – Men's 400 metres =

Men's 400 metres at the 1979 Pan American Games
- Venue: Estadio Sixto Escobar
- Dates: 11 & 12 July
- Winning time: 45.11

Medalists
Gold medal	Tony Darden	United States
Silver medal	Alberto Juantorena	Cuba
Bronze medal	Willie Smith	United States

The men's 400 metres sprint competition of the athletics events at the 1979 Pan American Games took place at the Estadio Sixto Escobar. The defending Pan American Games champion was Ronnie Ray of the United States.

== Records ==
Prior to this competition, the existing world and Pan American Games records were as follows:

World record	Lee Evans (USA)	43.86	Mexico City, Mexico	October 18, 1968
Pan American Games record	Ronnie Ray (USA)	44.45	Mexico City, Mexico	October 18, 1975

== Results ==
All times shown are in seconds.

KEY:	WR	World Record	GR	Pan American Record

=== Heats ===
Held on 11 July

Rank	Heat	Name	Nationality	Time	Notes
1	1	Willie Smith	United States	46.68	Q
2	3	Tony Darden	United States	46.91	Q
3	2	Delmo da Silva	Brazil	47.27	Q
4	1	Bert Cameron	Jamaica	47.29	Q
5	1	Joseph Coombs	Trinidad and Tobago	47.29	Q
6	2	Glenn Bogue	Canada	47.52	Q
6	3	Clyde Edwards	Barbados	47.52	Q
8	3	Colin Bradford	Jamaica	47.56	Q
9	2	Alberto Juantorena	Cuba	47.59	Q
10	1	Carlos Álvarez	Cuba	47.80	Q
11	3	Antônio Dias Ferreira	Brazil	47.81	Q
12	2	Michael Solomon	Trinidad and Tobago	47.95	Q
13	2	Fred Sowerby	Antigua and Barbuda	48.15	Q
14	3	Gregory Simons	Bermuda	48.24	Q
15	1	Brian Saunders	Canada	48.61	Q
16	3	Anatolio Ramírez	Dominican Republic	48.66	q
17	2	Gerold Pawirodikromo	Suriname	48.78	
18	2	Randolph Wheatley	Virgin Islands	48.89	
19	1	Francisco Solis	Dominican Republic	49.64	
20	3	Rigoberto Meléndez	Honduras	52.59	
21	1	Miguel Banegas	Honduras	52.97	

=== Semifinals ===
Held on 11 July

Rank	Heat	Name	Nationality	Time	Notes
1	2	Tony Darden	United States	45.89	Q
2	1	Willie Smith	United States	46.10	Q
3	2	Alberto Juantorena	Cuba	46.19	Q
4	2	Clyde Edwards	Barbados	46.32	Q
5	2	Brian Saunders	Canada	46.34	q
6	2	Bert Cameron	Jamaica	46.36	q
7	1	Joseph Coombs	Trinidad and Tobago	46.49	Q
8	1	Colin Bradford	Jamaica	46.51	Q
9	1	Glenn Bogue	Canada	46.63	
10	1	Delmo da Silva	Brazil	46.81	
11	2	Michael Solomon	Trinidad and Tobago	46.91	
12	1	Carlos Álvarez	Cuba	47.26	
13	1	Fred Sowerby	Antigua and Barbuda	47.29	
14	2	Antônio Dias Ferreira	Brazil	47.32	
15	1	Gregory Simons	Bermuda	47.66	
16	2	Anatolio Ramírez	Dominican Republic	49.12	

=== Final ===
Held on 12 July

Rank	Name	Nationality	Time	Notes
1st place, gold medalist(s)	Tony Darden	United States	45.11	
2nd place, silver medalist(s)	Alberto Juantorena	Cuba	45.24	
3rd place, bronze medalist(s)	Willie Smith	United States	45.30	
4	Bert Cameron	Jamaica	45.97	
5	Brian Saunders	Canada	46.16	
6	Colin Bradford	Jamaica	46.36	
7	Clyde Edwards	Barbados	46.66	
8	Joseph Coombs	Trinidad and Tobago	46.98	
