= Seymour Newman =

Jamaican athletics competitor

Personal information
- Born: Seymour Newman; 17 May 1953 (age 73) Manchester, Colony of Jamaica, British Empire
- Height: 1.88 m (6 ft 2 in)
- Weight: 73 kg (161 lb)

Sport
- Country: Jamaica
- Sport: Athletics
- Event: 800 metres
Medal record
Men's Athletics
Commonwealth Games
Silver medal – second place	1978 Edmonton	800 metres
Silver medal – second place	1978 Edmonton	4 x 400m relay
Central American and Caribbean Games
Silver medal – second place	1974 Santo Domingo	400 m
Central American and Caribbean Championships
Gold medal – first place	1977 Ponce	400 m
Gold medal – first place	1977 Ponce	800 m

Seymour Newman (born 17 May 1953) is a Jamaican former athlete who competed in short and middle-distance running events

== Biography ==
As a youth, Newman was a proficient cricketer and in the early 1970s he played for the Jamaica Under 19s team, in the same side as Jeff Dujon and Michael Holding.

Newman represented Jamaica in two events at the 1976 Summer Olympics. He made the semi-finals of the 800 metres and finished fifth in contentious circumstances, having been bumped during the race by US runner Rick Wohlhuter. The American was disqualified after the race but later reinstated, a decision which cost Newman a place in the final. He was also a member of the 4 × 400 metres relay team which made the final and finished in fifth position.

He won both the 400 metres and 800 metres races at the 1977 Central American and Caribbean Championships in Athletics. His run in the 400 metres final was in a field which included Cuba's Olympic champion Alberto Juantorena and set a personal best time, 45.66.

At the 1978 Commonwealth Games he won silver medals in the 800 metres and the 4 × 400 metres relay.

His personal best in the 800 metres, a time of 1:45.2 set in Helsinki in 1977, remains a Jamaican national record.

== International competitions ==
Year	Competition	Venue	Position	Event	Notes
Representing Jamaica
1972	CARIFTA Games	Bridgetown, Barbados	1st	400 m	47.6
1973	Central American and Caribbean Championships	Maracaibo, Venezuela	1st	4 × 400 m relay	3:09.4
1974	Commonwealth Games	Christchurch, New Zealand	9th (sf)	400 m	46.82
1974	Central American and Caribbean Games	Santo Domingo, Dominican Republic	2nd	400 m	46.34
1974	Central American and Caribbean Games	Santo Domingo, Dominican Republic	3rd	4 × 400 m relay	3:07.52
1976	Olympic Games	Montreal, Canada	11th (sf)	800 m	1:47.22
1976	Olympic Games	Montreal, Canada	5th	4 × 400 m relay	3:02.84
1977	Central American and Caribbean Championships	Xalapa, Mexico	1st	400 m	45.66
1977	Central American and Caribbean Championships	Xalapa, Mexico	1st	800 m	1:46.13
1978	Central American and Caribbean Games	Medellín, Colombia	3rd	400 m	46.11
1978	Central American and Caribbean Games	Medellín, Colombia	4th	400 m	1:47.69
1978	Commonwealth Games	Edmonton, Canada	2nd	800 m	1:47.30
1978	Commonwealth Games	Edmonton, Canada	5th (h)	4 × 400 m relay	3:09.17
