= Gerold Pawirodikromo =

Surinamese middle-distance runner

Personal information
- Born: 20 January 1958 (age 68) Diitabiki, Suriname
Medal record
Men's Athletics
Representing Suriname
Central American and Caribbean Games
Silver medal – second place	1978 Medellín	800 m

Gerold Pawirodikromo (born 20 January 1958) is a Surinamese former middle distance runner. He is best known for winning a silver medal in the 800 metres at the 1978 Central American and Caribbean Games in Medellín, Colombia behind only Alberto Juantorena with a time of 1:47.46. He also competed at the 1979 Pan American Games in San Juan, Puerto Rico.

He began training as a 12-year old in 1970. He went to the Andre Kamperveen Stadium for track cycling with his brother, but track and field trainer Vincent Burgos convinced him to try out athletics at the same venue. He became a member of track & field athletics club Olympia in Paramaribo and had many local victories, first at the 100 and 200 meter events. His second coach-trainer John Lieveld turned him into a 400 meters runner. In 1977, he went to Washington State University to study and compete. In the USA his American coach let him specialize on the 800 meters event. Pawirodikromo was an NCAA indoor all-American in the mile relay in 1980.

== International competitions ==
Year	Competition	Venue	Position	Event	Notes
Representing Suriname
1978	Central American and Caribbean Games	Medellín, Colombia	(h)	400 m	47.09
1978	Central American and Caribbean Games	Medellín, Colombia	2nd	800 m	1:47.46
1979	Pan American Games	San Juan, Puerto Rico	17th (h)	400 m	48.78
1979	Pan American Games	San Juan, Puerto Rico	7th (sf)	800 m	1:50.7
