= Jorge Ortíz (athlete) =

Puerto Rican sprinter

Personal information
- Full name: Jorge Luis Ortíz Rivera
- Nationality: Puerto Rican
- Born: 7 November 1954 (age 72)
- Height: 1.75 m (5 ft 9 in)
- Weight: 66 kg (146 lb)

Sport
- Sport: Sprinting
- Events: 400 metres, 800 metres

Jorge Luis Ortíz Rivera (born 7 November 1954) is a Puerto Rican sprinter and middle-distance runner. He competed in the men's 4 × 400 metres relay at the 1976 Summer Olympics.

== International competitions ==
Year	Competition	Venue	Position	Event	Notes
Representing Puerto Rico
1976	Olympic Games	Montreal, Canada	36th (h)	800 m	1:51.38
1976	Olympic Games	Montreal, Canada	11th (h)	4 × 400 m relay	3:06.08
1977	Central American and Caribbean Championships	Xalapa, Mexico	2nd	1500 m	1:48.67
1977	Central American and Caribbean Championships	Xalapa, Mexico	3rd	4 × 400 m relay	3:11.78
1977	Universiade	Sofia, Bulgaria	15th (h)	800 m	1:50.6
1978	Central American and Caribbean Games	Medellín, Colombia	3rd (h)	800 m	1:51.48^{1}
1978	Central American and Caribbean Games	Medellín, Colombia	5th	1500 m	3:52.03
1979	Pan American Games	San Juan, Puerto Rico	10th	1500 m	3:49.8

^{1}Did not finish in the final

== Personal bests ==
- 400 metres – 47.2 (1976)
- 800 metres – 1:48.67 (1977)
