= Joseph Coombs =

Trinidad and Tobago sprinter

Joseph Coombs (born June 15, 1952 in Montrose, Chaguanas) is a retired athlete from Trinidad and Tobago who specialized in the 400 metres and 4 x 400 metres relay.

Coombs was an NJCAA champion sprinter for Essex County College in 1977. He was an NCAA champion sprinter for the Alabama Crimson Tide track and field team, anchoring the winning 4 × 400 m relay team at the 1978 NCAA Indoor Track and Field Championships.

He now resides with his wife and his children.

== International competitions ==
Year	Competition	Venue	Position	Event	Notes
Representing Trinidad and Tobago
1976	Olympic Games	Montreal, Canada	6th	4 × 400 m relay	3:03.46
1978	Central American and Caribbean Games	Medellín, Colombia	2nd	400 m	45.41
1978	Central American and Caribbean Games	Medellín, Colombia	2nd	4 × 400 m relay	3:05.01
1978	Commonwealth Games	Edmonton, Canada	2nd	400 m	46.54
1978	Commonwealth Games	Edmonton, Canada	5th	4 × 400 m relay	3:06.73
1979	Pan American Games	San Juan, Puerto Rico	8th	400 m	46.98
1979	Pan American Games	San Juan, Puerto Rico	6th	4 × 400 m relay	3:11.6
1980	Olympic Games	Moscow, Soviet Union	8th	400 m	46.33
1980	Olympic Games	Moscow, Soviet Union	6th	4 × 400 m relay	3:06.6
1982	Central American and Caribbean Games	Havana, Cuba	6th	400 m	48.36
1982	Central American and Caribbean Games	Havana, Cuba	3rd	4 × 400 m relay	3:08.20
