= Carlos Álvarez (athlete) =

Cuban sprinter (born 1956)

Personal information
- Full name: Carlos Mario Álvarez Sánchez
- Born: 12 September 1956 (age 69) Sagua de Tánamo, Cuba
- Height: 1.85 m (6 ft 1 in)
- Weight: 74 kg (163 lb)

Sport
- Sport: Sprinting
- Event: 400 metres

Carlos Mario Álvarez Sánchez (born 12 September 1956) is a Cuban sprinter. He competed in the men's 4 × 400 metres relay at the 1976 Summer Olympics. He won a silver medal at the 1975 Pan American Games in the 4 x 400 metres relay.

== International competitions ==
Year	Competition	Venue	Position	Event	Notes
Representing Cuba
1975	Pan American Games	Mexico City, Mexico	2nd	4 × 400 m relay	3:02.82
1976	Olympic Games	Montreal, Canada	7th	4 × 400 m relay	3:03.81
1978	Central American and Caribbean Games	Medellín, Colombia	6th	400 m	46.72
1978	Central American and Caribbean Games	Medellín, Colombia	3rd	4 × 400 m relay	3:05.57
1979	Pan American Games	San Juan, Puerto Rico	12th (sf)	400 m	47.26
1979	Pan American Games	San Juan, Puerto Rico	3rd	4 × 400 m relay	3:06.3

== Personal bests ==
- 400 metres – 46.3 (1976)
