= Clive Barriffe =

Jamaican track and field athlete

Clive Barriffe (born 1955) is a Jamaican former track and field athlete who competed in the 400 metres hurdles and the 4×400 metres relay. He was the silver medallist with the Jamaican relay team at the 1978 Commonwealth Games, running in a team including Bertland Cameron, Colin Bradford and Floyd Brown. He also placed sixth individually in the hurdles at that competition. That same year he was a relay champion with Jamaica at the 1978 Central American and Caribbean Games.

Barriffe competed for the Florida Gators track and field team in the NCAA.

== International competitions ==
Year	Competition	Venue	Position	Event	Notes
Representing Jamaica
1973	CARIFTA Games (U20)	Port of Spain, Trinidad and Tobago	1st	110 m hurdles	14.8
1973	CARIFTA Games (U20)	Port of Spain, Trinidad and Tobago	1st	300 m hurdles	41.0
1973	CARIFTA Games (U20)	Port of Spain, Trinidad and Tobago	1st	High jump	1.95 m
1973	Central American and Caribbean Championships	Maracaibo, Venezuela	6th	110 m hurdles	14.7
1974	Central American and Caribbean Games	Santo Domingo, Dominican Republic	3rd	4 × 400 m relay	54.7
1974	Central American and Caribbean Games	Santo Domingo, Dominican Republic	5th	High jump	1.95 m
1974	CARIFTA Games (U20)	Kingston, Jamaica	1st	110 m hurdles	14.8
1974	CARIFTA Games (U20)	Kingston, Jamaica	1st	400 m hurdles	54.7
1978	Central American and Caribbean Games	Medellín, Colombia	1st	400 m hurdles	50.16
1978	Central American and Caribbean Games	Medellín, Colombia	1st	4 × 400 m relay	3:03.76
1978	Commonwealth Games	Edmonton, Canada	6th	400 m hurdles	51.50
1978	Commonwealth Games	Edmonton, Canada	2nd	4 × 400 m relay	3:04.00
