= Floyd Brown (athlete) =

Jamaican sprinter (born 1957)

Personal information
- Born: 8 September 1957 Montego Bay, Jamaica
- Died: 21 January 2022 (aged 64)
Medal record
Men's athletics
Representing Jamaica
Central American and Caribbean Championships
Gold medal – first place	1979 Guadalajara	200 m
Gold medal – first place	1981 Santo Domingo	4 × 100 m relay
Gold medal – first place	1981 Santo Domingo	4 × 400 m relay
Silver medal – second place	1979 Guadalajara	4 × 100 m relay
Central American and Caribbean Games
Gold medal – first place	1978 Medellín	4 × 400 m relay
Silver medal – second place	1982 Havana	4 × 100 m relay
Silver medal – second place	1982 Havana	4 × 400 m relay
Commonwealth Games
Silver medal – second place	1978 Edmonton	4 × 400 m relay
Pan American Games
Silver medal – second place	1979 San Juan	4 × 400 m relay

Floyd "Bunny" Brown (born 8 September 1957 – 21 January 2022) was a Jamaican and later U.S. Virgin Islands sprinter.

== International competitions ==
Year	Competition	Venue	Position	Event	Notes
Representing Jamaica
1978	Central American and Caribbean Games	Medellín, Colombia	4th	4 × 100 m relay	39.91
1978	Central American and Caribbean Games	Medellín, Colombia	1st	4 × 400 m relay	3:03.76
1978	Commonwealth Games	Edmonton, Canada	5th	200 m	20.79
1978	Commonwealth Games	Edmonton, Canada	3rd	4 × 100 m relay	39.33
1978	Commonwealth Games	Edmonton, Canada	2nd	4 × 400 m relay	3:04.00
1979	Central American and Caribbean Championships	Guadalajara, Mexico	1st	200 m	21.30
1979	Central American and Caribbean Championships	Guadalajara, Mexico	2nd	4 × 100 m relay	40.17
1979	Pan American Games	San Juan, Puerto Rico	5th	200 m	20.74
1979	Pan American Games	San Juan, Puerto Rico	2nd	4 × 400 m relay	3:04.7
1979	Universiade	Mexico City, Mexico	10th (sf)	100 m	10.35
1979	Universiade	Mexico City, Mexico	10th (sf)	200 m	20.92
1979	Universiade	Mexico City, Mexico	7th	4 × 400 m relay	3:12.04
1981	Central American and Caribbean Championships	Santo Domingo, Dominican Republic	1st	4 × 100 m relay	39.30
1981	Central American and Caribbean Championships	Santo Domingo, Dominican Republic	1st	4 × 400 m relay	3:06.95
1982	Central American and Caribbean Games	Havana, Cuba	6th	200 m	21.39
1982	Central American and Caribbean Games	Havana, Cuba	2nd	4 × 100 m relay	39.94
1982	Central American and Caribbean Games	Havana, Cuba	2nd	4 × 400 m relay	3:04.78
Representing the United States Virgin Islands
1986	Central American and Caribbean Games	Santiago, Dominican Republic	18th (h)	400 m	49.07
1986	Central American and Caribbean Games	Santiago, Dominican Republic	6th	4 × 100 m relay	40.56
1986	Central American and Caribbean Games	Santiago, Dominican Republic	8th	4 × 400 m relay	3:22.87
1987	Pan American Games	Indianapolis, United States	–	400 m hurdles	DNF
1987	Pan American Games	Indianapolis, United States	5th	4 × 100 m relay	40.51
