= Renelda Swan =

Bermudian sprinter

Personal information
- Nationality: Bermudian
- Born: 12 December 1957 (age 68)

Sport
- Sport: Sprinting
- Event: 400 metres

Renelda Swan (born 12 December 1957) is a Bermudian sprinter. He competed in the men's 400 metres at the 1976 Summer Olympics.
