= Bert Cameron =

Jamaican sprinter (born 1959)

Personal information
- Nationality: Jamaican
- Born: 16 November 1959 (age 66) Spanish Town, Saint Catherine Parish

Sport
- Sport: Running
- Event: 400 meters
- College team: UTEP Miners
Medal record
Men's athletics
Representing Jamaica
World Championships
Gold medal – first place	1983 Helsinki	400 m
Olympic Games
Silver medal – second place	1988 Seoul	4 × 400 m relay
Commonwealth Games
Gold medal – first place	1982 Brisbane	400 m
Silver medal – second place	1978 Edmonton	4 × 400 m relay
Pan American Games
Silver medal – second place	1987 Indianapolis	400 m
Central American and Caribbean Games
Gold medal – first place	1982 Havana	400 m
CAC Championships
Gold medal – first place	1981 Santo Domingo	400 m

Bertland Cameron (born 16 November 1959) is a retired Jamaican sprinter who mainly competed over 400 metres. He represented Jamaica at three consecutive editions of the Summer Olympics. Cameron won the 400 m title at the first World Championships in Athletics. He was also the 1982 Commonwealth Games champion in the event, and won a number of gold medals at regional competitions. He helped the Jamaican runners to a silver medal in the 4 × 400 metres relay at the 1988 Seoul Olympics.

Cameron carried the Jamaican flag at the opening ceremony of the 1984 Summer Olympics in Los Angeles, California. He was chosen as the Jamaica Sportsperson of the year three times consecutively from 1981 to 1983. He is currently a coach in Jamaica.

== Career ==
Born in Spanish Town, Saint Catherine Parish, Cameron attended St. Jago High School. His first medal on the international stage came at the 1978 Commonwealth Games, where he helped Jamaica to a 4 × 400 m relay silver medal behind Kenya. His first Olympic appearance soon followed, and he reached the quarter-finals of the 400 m and also ran in the relay. He was schooled in the United States on a sports scholarship and won both the NCAA 400 m titles indoors and outdoors in 1980 and 1981, and he went on to obtain a third outdoor title in 1983 for the UTEP Miners. Cameron represented the Americas at the 1981 IAAF World Cup and came away with the bronze medal in both the individual and relay events. He returned to the Commonwealth stage for the 1982 Games and he became the 400 m champion.

Cameron won the 400 m at the inaugural World Championships in 1983. He had a good run in the 1984 Olympic semi-final, but halfway through the race grabbed his leg as a result of picking up a muscle injury. However, in one of the great comebacks of all time, he miraculously managed to start running again and qualified for the final. Unfortunately, his injury was such that he was not able to take his place in the final. He competed at the 1987 World Championships in Athletics but failed to defend his title, being eliminated in the semi-finals. He helped the Jamaican relay team to sixth place in the final. Four years after his injury-battling run, he ran at the 1988 Summer Olympics and helped win a silver medal in 4 × 400 metres relay.

Outside his global appearances for Jamaica, he enjoyed success at regional level. He won the 400 m at the 1981 Central American and Caribbean Championships and followed this with another gold medal at the 1982 CAC Games. He returned to the CAC Championships in 1985 and won the silver medal behind Cuba's Roberto Hernández. At the 1987 Pan American Games, he beat the Cuban but again left with the silver medal as Raymond Pierre took the title.

After retiring from running, he became a coach in Kingston, Jamaica. He took on Jermaine Gonzales and his charge broke the 400 m Jamaican record in 2010. He decided to start working with Gonzales within Glen Mills' Racers Track Club that year.

== International competitions ==
Year	Competition	Venue	Position	Event	Notes
Representing Jamaica
1978	Central American and Caribbean Games	Medellín, Colombia	1st	4 × 400 m relay	3:03.76
1978	Commonwealth Games	Edmonton, Canada	17th (qf)	400 m	47.20
1978	Commonwealth Games	Edmonton, Canada	2nd	4 × 400 m relay	3:04.00
1979	Pan American Games	San Juan, Puerto Rico	4th	400 m	45.97
1979	Pan American Games	San Juan, Puerto Rico	2nd	4 × 400 m relay	3:04.7
1980	Olympic Games	Moscow, Soviet Union	26th (q)	400 m	47.31
1980	Olympic Games	Moscow, Soviet Union	–	4 × 400 m relay	DNF
1981	Central American and Caribbean Championships	Santo Domingo, Dominican Rep.	1st	400 m	45.05
1981	Central American and Caribbean Championships	Santo Domingo, Dominican Rep.	1st	4 × 400 m relay	3:06.95
1982	Central American and Caribbean Games	Havana, Havana	1st	400 m	45.10
1982	Central American and Caribbean Games	Havana, Havana	2nd	4 × 400 m relay	3:04.78
1982	Commonwealth Games	Brisbane, Australia	1st	400 m	45.89
1983	World Championships	Helsinki, Finland	1st	400 m	45.05
1984	Olympic Games	Los Angeles, United States	4th (sf)	400 m	45.10^{1}
1985	Central American and Caribbean Championships	Nassau, Bahamas	2nd	400 m	45.44
1987	Pan American Games	Indianapolis, United States	2nd	400 m	44.72
1987	World Championships	Rome, Italy	9th (sf)	400 m	45.19
1987	World Championships	Rome, Italy	6th	4 × 400 m relay	3:04.53
1988	Olympic Games	Seoul, South Korea	6th	400 m	44.94
1988	Olympic Games	Seoul, South Korea	2nd	4 × 400 m relay	3:00.30
1989	World Indoor Championships	Budapest, Hungary	12th (sf)	400 m	47.78

^{1}Did not start in the final
