= Appunidage Premachandra =

Sri Lankan sprinter (born 1953)

Personal information
- Nationality: Sri Lankan
- Born: 18 May 1953 (age 73)

Sport
- Sport: Sprinting
- Event: 4 × 400 metres relay
Medal record
Men's athletics
Representing Sri Lanka
Asian Championships
Bronze medal – third place	1975 Seoul	4×400 m

Appunidage Premachandra (born 18 May 1953) is a Sri Lankan sprinter. He competed in the men's 4 × 400 metres relay at the 1980 Summer Olympics.
