= Glen Cohen =

British sprinter (born 1954)

Personal information
- Nationality: British/Jamaican
- Born: 22 April 1954 (age 72) Linstead, Saint Catherine, Jamaica
- Height: 185 cm (6 ft 1 in)
- Weight: 76 kg (168 lb)

Sport
- Sport: Athletics
- Event: 400 m
- Club: WBAC
Medal record
Men's athletics
Representing Great Britain
European Championships
Gold medal – first place	1974 Rome	4×400 m

Glendon Howard Cohen (born 22 April 1954) is a male retired Jamaican-born British track and field athlete who competed in the sprints.

== Biography ==
Born in Linstead, St. Catherine, Jamaica, he moved over to England as a child, growing up in Wolverhampton, and represented Great Britain at the Olympic Games of 1976 and 1980 in the 400 metres. He was a member of Wolverhampton & Bilston Athletics Club. His personal best of 45.49 was achieved in 1978.

Cohen finished second behind David Jenkins in the 400 metres event at the 1975 AAA Championships.

He represented England in the 400 metres and 400 metres relay events, at the 1978 Commonwealth Games in Edmonton, Alberta, Canada.

Cohen competed for the Boston University Terriers track and field team in the NCAA.
