= Cuthbert Jacobs =

Antigua and Barbuda sprinter

Personal information
- Nationality: Antigua and Barbuda
- Born: 5 January 1952 (age 74)

Sport
- Sport: Sprinting
- Event: 200 metres

Cuthbert E. Jacobs (born 5 January 1952) is an Antigua and Barbuda sprinter. He competed in the men's 200 metres at the 1976 Summer Olympics.
