= Garry Brown (athlete) =

Australian hurdler (born 1954)

Personal information
- Nationality: Australian
- Born: 27 October 1954 (age 71)

Sport
- Sport: Athletics
- Event: hurdles
Medal record
Representing Australia
Commonwealth Games
Gold medal – first place	1982 Brisbane	400 m hurdles
Silver medal – second place	1978 Edmonton	400 m hurdles
Bronze medal – third place	1978 Edmonton	4×400 m relay

Garry Brown (born 27 October 1954) is an Australian former track and field athlete who specialised in the 400 metres hurdles. He was the champion in that event at the 1982 Commonwealth Games after winning two minor medals at the 1978 Commonwealth Games. His personal best of 49.37 seconds was set as part of his Commonwealth win.

== Career ==
Raised in Queensland, he began to reach the top level nationally in the late 1970s, taking the runner-up spot at the Australian Athletics Championships behind Peter Grant in 1977. He was coached by former hurdler Gary Knoke. Brown's first international appearances came at the 1977 IAAF World Cup (sixth in the final) and the 1977 Pacific Conference Games, where he was the gold medallist at the Canberra-hosted event. He also came third in the 400 m hurdles at the AAA Championships in England that year, beaten by Rich Graybehl and Alan Pascoe.

Brown was among the favourites for the 1978 Commonwealth Games, but in the strong wind of the final both he and Alan Pascoe of England (the defending champion) were beaten by Kenya's Daniel Kimaiyo, who was the newly minted All-Africa Games champion. Brown was left with the silver medal in the hurdles. After his individual medal, he added another bronze medal with the Australian 4×400 metres relay team of Chum Darvall, John Higham and Rick Mitchell.

After missing 1979, the 1980 season saw Brown become the Australian national champion in the hurdles for the first time. He repeated that feat two consecutive times and his 1982 time of 49.89 seconds was the fastest electronically recorded time at the championships until 1988. He placed sixth at both the 1981 IAAF World Cup and the 1981 Pacific Conference Games, but came away with a relay gold medal at the latter competition.

In the last major season of his career, he began with a runner-up finish at the AAA Championships behind America's James King. The 1982 Commonwealth Games were held in Brisbane and he was the home favourite for the 400 m hurdles. Coming into the final straight, Ugandan Peter Rwamuhanda was in first place but, after a stumble at the final hurdle, Brown took the lead. Brown had a lifetime best in the race, running 49.37 seconds to become the Commonwealth champion. This time placed him second to Bruce Field (49.32) on the all-time Australian ranking and 15th in the world rankings that year. Although only in his late twenties, this proved to be the last major outing internationally as he was not part of the Australian relay team and withdrew from the first ever Australian squad for the 1983 World Championships in Athletics. He still competed successfully at a national level until 1984.

After his retirement from active competition, he went on to become an athletics coach, specialising in teaching hurdling technique. He also published articles on the subject. The Queensland Club Championships was titled the Garry Brown Shield in his honour.

== International competitions ==
Year	Competition	Venue	Position	Event	Notes
1977	IAAF World Cup	Düsseldorf, West Germany	6th	400 m hurdles	50.89
1977	Pacific Conference Games	Canberra, Australia	1st	400 m hurdles	51.89
1978	Commonwealth Games	Edmonton, Canada	2nd	400 m hurdles	50.04
1978	Commonwealth Games	Edmonton, Canada	3rd	4 × 400 m relay	3:04.23
1981	IAAF World Cup	Rome, Italy	6th	400 m hurdles	50.59
1981	Pacific Conference Games	Christchurch, New Zealand	1st	4 × 400 m relay	3:07.03
1982	Commonwealth Games	Brisbane, Australia	1st	400 m hurdles	49.37

== National titles ==
- Australian Athletics Championships
  - 400 metres hurdles: 1980, 1981, 1982
