= Daniel Taillon =

Canadian hurdler

Personal information
- Born: 9 October 1952 (age 73) Montreal, Quebec, Canada

Sport
- Sport: Track and field
- Event: 110 metres hurdles

Daniel Taillon (born 9 October 1952) is a Canadian hurdler. He competed in the men's 110 metres hurdles at the 1976 Summer Olympics.
