= Rawle Clarke =

Barbadian sprinter (born 1952)

Personal information
- Nationality: Barbadian
- Born: 17 September 1952 (age 73)

Sport
- Sport: Sprinting
- Event: 200 metres

Rawle Clarke (born 17 September 1952) is a Barbadian sprinter. He competed in the men's 200 metres at the 1976 Summer Olympics.

In athletics at the 1979 Pan American Games, Clarke finished 7th in the 100 metres. In 2013, he was the first Caribbean man to be inducted into the Huntsman World Senior Games Hall of Fame.
