= Roger Jenkins (banker) =

British financier (born 1955)

- Born: Roger Allan Jenkins; 30 September 1955 (age 70); Scotland
- Education: Edinburgh Academy
- Alma mater: Heriot-Watt University ifs School of Finance
- Occupation: Financier
- Spouses: Catherine McDowell (divorced) Sanela Dijana Ćatić (m. 1999; div. 2011) Larissa Andrade (m. 2018; div. 2021)
- Children: 3
- Relatives: David Jenkins (brother)

Roger Allan Jenkins (born 30 September 1955) is a British financier and former international athlete. He is the brother of Olympic medalist David Jenkins.

From 2006, Jenkins worked for Barclays Capital as head of Private Equity, Principal Investments and Structured Capital Markets. From April 2008 as Executive Chairman of Investment Banking and Investment Management for the Middle East.

In 2008, he played a key role in raising capital for Barclays Group, bringing in over 9 billion pounds. He left Barclays in the summer of 2009. In 2011, he joined the Management Committee and Investment Committee of the Brazilian investment bank BTG Pactual until 2013. Jenkins is said to have earned about £40 million in 2005, making him reputedly the highest paid banker in the City of London.

== Biography ==
Jenkins was born in Scotland, the son of an oil refinery manager. He attended Edinburgh Academy and studied economics at Heriot-Watt University graduating with an Honors Degree. He was an Associate of the Chartered Institute of Bankers (ACIB) and received his Diploma in Financial Studies from the Institute.

In his youth he was an accomplished sprinter, representing Scotland and Great Britain from 1973 to 1978 and competed at the European Championships in 1974, the Commonwealth Games in 1978, and numerous internationals. He won a silver medal at the World Student Games in Rome in 1975 at 400m. Both Roger and his brother David feature prominently in the book A Life In A Day In A Year by Peter Hoffmann which describes their athletics training at Meadowbank Sports Centre, Edinburgh, and their racing careers between 1973 and 1978.

== Early career ==
Jenkins worked briefly at BP after graduation in 1977 and joined Barclays as a graduate trainee in 1978. From 1982 to 1984 he was head of private placements at Barclays's investment banking division, Barclays de Zoete Wedd (BZW), in New York City, leaving in 1987 to work for Kleinwort Benson, where he was a Director and Co-Head of Financial Markets and he stayed for seven years. He rejoined Barclays in 1994 to set up a group advising companies on tax and regulatory management.

== Barclays ==
=== Structured Capital Markets ===
Jenkins developed an expertise in structuring and analysing the tax regimes of various countries. His group became Barclays Capital Structured Capital Markets. It recruited beyond banking and included Iain Abrahams, a former lawyer at Slaughter and May.

In 2009, The Guardian reported tales of a macho culture inside the Structured Capital Markets division, where, one source claimed, "the deals are so big you never say billion or million, you just say 16 bucks or 16 quid which meant billion". The same source suggested that tax avoidance "was so big it became the engine of growth for the whole of the investment banking arm".

The Salz report stated that between 2000 and 2011 the SCM business generated revenue of 9.5 billion pounds. (Guardian Jill Treanor).

=== Wall Street Journal investigation ===
A 2006 investigation by The Wall Street Journal, alleged that in 2003, Jenkins and his team had set up a company co-owned by Barclays and the US bank Wachovia, Augustus Funding LLC, which was incorporated in Delaware but also had a London address and British directors. Although the company had no employees, products or customers, in 2004, it registered pretax profits of $317 million from assets such as Danish mortgage securities and U.S. Treasuries, on which it paid UK taxes of $94 million.

According to The Wall Street Journal, thanks to "elaborate structure and cash flows", both Barclays and Wachovia were able to take credit for a full payment of the tax, meaning the $94 million could be claimed twice (a so-called "double dip"). The report suggested that Augustus Funding was one of at least nine structures involving US banks set up by Barclays. Barclays called the account of the transactions "materially inaccurate", while a statement from Wachovia said that they had "complied with all applicable laws and regulations".

=== iShares ===
Jenkins played a key role in the selling of Barclays' iShares asset management business to CVC, the private equity firm but that did not close and Barclays Global Investors was then sold to the US firm BlackRock for $13.5 billion in June 2009.

== After Barclays ==
Jenkins left Barclays in August 2009. He retained a consultancy role with the bank while establishing his own advisory business, Elkstone, based on his contacts in the Middle East.

In February 2010, Jenkins launched an advisory firm in Dublin, Elkstone Capital, looking at opportunities created by the Irish financial crisis. "If you are sitting in Dublin today, there are tremendous opportunities, from capital raising to restructuring to acquisitions," he said. Nonetheless, Jenkins left Elkstone Capital in December 2011 without doing any deals.

In October 2011, it was announced that Jenkins had joined BTG Pactual as a managing partner and would sit on the bank's global management and investment committees.

In 2016 he invested in a fund to acquire a cannabis cultivation facility in Northern California, and subsequently that ownership was sold.

== Personal life ==
Jenkins married Catherine McDowell in 1980, a banker at Barclays, and had one daughter. In 1999 he married Sanela Dijana Ćatić, whom he had met in the gym at the Barbican, where Roger Jenkins was living after the end of his first marriage. Diana is a Bosnian Muslim who was born in Bosnia but migrated to London from Sarajevo during the Bosnian War. Jenkins has said that they had "a bit of a hippy marriage". They have two children.

In 2011 it was announced that their marriage had come to "a natural end" in 2009 and they jointly filed for divorce in late 2011. Diana said she still loves her husband but she needs to be free, saying, "this is my time to be me".

In February 2018, Jenkins announced his engagement to Larissa Andrade, a Brazilian model and actress 29 years his junior living in Los Angeles and on 11 August 2018 they were married in Txai, Bahia, Brazil and subsequently divorced in December 2021.

Jenkins moved back to the United Kingdom in 2019.
