= Elroy Turner =

Antigua and Barbuda sprinter

Personal information
- Nationality: Antigua and Barbuda
- Born: 28 January 1951 (age 75)

Sport
- Sport: Sprinting
- Event: 4 × 100 metres relay

Elroy Turner (born 28 January 1951) is an Antigua and Barbuda sprinter. He competed in the men's 4 × 100 metres relay at the 1976 Summer Olympics.
