= Terry Whitehead =

British sprinter

Personal information
- Born: 10 January 1957 (age 69) Peterborough, England
- Height: 185 cm (6 ft 1 in)
- Weight: 73 kg (161 lb)

Sport
- Sport: Athletics
- Event: Sprinting/400m
- Club: Chelmsford AC

Robert Terence John Whitehead (born 10 January 1957) is a British sprinter. Whitehead competed at the 1980 Summer Olympics.

== Biography ==
Whitehead finished third behind Maurice Peoples in the 400 metres event at the 1978 AAA Championships. Shortly afterwards he represented England at the 1978 Commonwealth Games in Edmonton, Canada, in the 400 metres and 4 x 400 metres relay events.

At the 1980 Olympics Games in Moscow, he represented Great Britain in the men's 4 × 400 metres relay.
