= Edwin Noel =

Trinidad and Tobago sprinter

Edwin Noel (born April 22, 1950 in Trinidad) is a retired sprinter from Trinidad and Tobago who specialized in the 200 metres.

== Achievements ==
Year	Tournament	Venue	Result	Extra
1978	Central American and Caribbean Games	Medellín, Colombia	1st	4 × 100 m relay
	Commonwealth Games	Edmonton, Canada	2nd	4 × 100 m relay
1979	Pan American Games	San Juan, Puerto Rico	7th	4 × 100 m relay
