= Glenn Bogue =

Canadian sprinter (born 1955)

Personal information
- Born: 30 August 1955 (age 70) Toronto, Ontario, Canada
- Height: 173 cm (5 ft 8 in)
- Weight: 67 kg (148 lb)

Sport
- Sport: Sprinting
- Event: 400 metres
- Club: Rexdale
Medal record
Men's athletics
Representing Canada
Pan American Games
Bronze medal – third place	1975 Mexico City	4 x 400 m relay
Commonwealth Games
Bronze medal – third place	1978 Edmonton	400 metres

Glenn Bogue (born 30 August 1955) is a Canadian sprinter. He competed in the men's 400 metres at the 1976 Summer Olympics. He won a bronze medal in the 4 x 400 metres relay at the 1975 Pan American Games. In the 400 metres at the 1979 Pan American Games, Bogue finished eighth. He won a bronze medal in the 400 metres at the 1978 Commonwealth Games.
