= David Jenkins (sprinter) =

Scottish athlete (born 1952)

Personal information
- Nationality: British
- Born: 25 May 1952 (age 74) Pointe-à-Pierre, Couva-Tabaquite-Talparo, Trinidad and Tobago
- Height: 190 cm (6 ft 3 in)
- Weight: 82 kg (181 lb)

Sport
- Sport: Athletics
- Event: 400 m
- Club: Rugby & District AC; Gateshead Harriers; Birchfield Harriers
Medal record
Men's athletics
Representing Great Britain
Olympic Games
| Silver medal – second place | 1972 Munich | 4×400 m |
European Championships
| Gold medal – first place | 1971 Helsinki | 400 m |
| Gold medal – first place | 1974 Rome | 4×400 m |
| Silver medal – second place | 1974 Rome | 400 m |
| Silver medal – second place | 1982 Athens | 4×400 m |
European Cup
| Gold medal – first place | 1975 Nice | 400 m |
| Gold medal – first place | 1975 Nice | 4×400 m |
| Silver medal – second place | 1973 Edinburgh | 400 m |
| Bronze medal – third place | 1973 Edinburgh | 4×400 m |
Universiade
| Silver medal – second place | 1973 Moscow | 4×400 m |
| Bronze medal – third place | 1973 Moscow | 400 m |
Representing Scotland
Commonwealth Games
| Gold medal – first place | 1978 Edmonton | 4×100 m |

David Andrew Jenkins (born 25 May 1952) is a former World ranked no.1 track and field 400 metres runner and statistically is the highest ranking Scottish sprinter in history.

He was part of the British relay team which won a silver medal at the 1972 Munich Summer Olympics. In 1988, he received a 7-year prison sentence for drug smuggling, but was able to serve a reduced sentence by becoming an informant.

== Early life and education ==
Born in Pointe-à-Pierre, Trinidad and Tobago, British West Indies, Jenkins was the son of an oil refinery manager.

Jenkins was educated at Edinburgh Academy, where he excelled at sport. From 1970 to 1973 he attended the University of Edinburgh (1970–1973) where, as a BP industrial apprentice. He earned a Bachelor of Science in chemical engineering. He then went on to study at Heriot-Watt University in Edinburgh, where he received a postgraduate diploma in business management and marketing (1974).

In 1976, Jenkins was awarded a Travelling Fellowship from the Winston Churchill Memorial Trusts. His project's title was "Community sport participation and provision", and the fellowship enabled him to visit the United States and West Germany.

Jenkins was, for a few years in early 2000s, the U.S. representative for The Edinburgh Academy's Academical Club.

== Athletics career ==
Jenkins' first coach was Jake Young, then head of physical education at the Edinburgh Academy. In his youth, Jenkins was the European record holder at 400-metres for under 17 and under 19 years old. In 1969 he represented Great Britain's senior open team in Hamburg, West Germany, winning the 400-metres aged 17 years four months. Jenkins' international athletic career spanned three decades from 1969 through to 1982, starting on cinder tracks, to synthetic tracks & from hand timing to electronic timing.

From 1970 to 1973 and again in 1980 Jenkins was coached by the then Scottish National Coach, John Anderson. He started off as Scottish 100/200/400 champion, followed by his first of 6 AAA's 400 metre titles. Also in 1971, still aged only nineteen, Jenkins won the 400 metres at the 1971 European Athletics Championships in Helsinki, the youngest British male athlete yet to win a European gold medal. Jenkins set a junior world record as part of the British 4 × 400 metres team on 26 September 1971. The team consisted of Jenkins, Gary Armstrong, Desmond Coneys and Joe Caines.

He went on to compete for Great Britain in the 1972 Summer Olympics held in Munich, Germany in the 4 × 400-metre relay where he won the silver medal with his teammates Martin Reynolds, Alan Pascoe and David Hemery. From 1973 to 1977 Hemery, a contemporary and 1968 Olympic hurdles champion, coached Jenkins.

In 1974 he won the silver medal on the 400 metres at the European Athletics Championships in Rome as well as the gold medal in the 4 × 400-metre with his teammates Glen Cohen, William Hartley and Alan Pascoe. Commentating on the race for the BBC David Coleman remarked that Jenkins had the "greatest run of his life", when he won the 4 × 400 m relay.

In 1975 he was United States of America 400-metre champion, with his fastest time of his career 44.93 which was a British record at the time. In 1975, Jenkins and his brother, Roger Jenkins, represented Great Britain and Northern Ireland v. Finland at Crystal Palace, London as the UK's No. 1 and No. 2 400-metre runners.

Both David and his brother Roger feature prominently in the book A Life In A Day In A Year by Peter Hoffmann which describes their athletics training at Meadowbank Stadium, Edinburgh and their racing careers between 1973 and 1978.

Scottish documentary company, Pelicula Films, featured David Jenkins during his training in 1975 as he prepared for the 1976 Summer Olympics. The film, The Long Sprint: Diary of an Olympic Athlete, follows Jenkins from his training, races and the Olympic Games heats. Jenkins qualified for the Olympic 400-metre finals but did not win a medal. The documentary film was directed by Michael Alexander and won the Gold Grand Prix Award in the British International Sport Film and Television Festival, the Toronto Film Festival and the Turin Film Festival in 1977.

In 1976 and 1980 Jenkins finished seventh in the 400-metre final at the Summer Olympics. In 1977 he participated in the first IAAF World Cup in the 4 × 400-metre relay at the Rheinstadion, in Düsseldorf, West Germany. He also won the 200 metres at the Jubilee Games event. In 1978 he won a gold medal competing for Scotland at the Commonwealth Games in Edmonton, Canada in the 4 × 100 m relay, alongside Cameron Sharp, Allan Wells and Drew McMaster. In 1980 he was U.K 400-metre champion.

He competed at the 1982 European Championships in the 4 × 400–metre relay team which won the silver medal in this event.

He later admitted to having taken performance-enhancing steroids during the latter part of his athletics career, from around 1976.

In 1998 former British 400-metre Olympic silver medallist Roger Black dedicated a chapter titled "The Jenkins Factor", in his autobiography How Long is the Course ISBN 0-233-99644-3 to Jenkins who was helping advise him in the final months of his 1996 Olympic preparation. Jenkins was credited with changing Black's philosophy on sports and competition.

=== Personal bests ===
- British record holder over 400 metres from 1971 to 1985.
- Held British and United Kingdom records for best performances 100 metres at 10.1 seconds [10.33], 200 metres at 20.3 seconds [20.66], 300 metres at 32.44 seconds, 400 metres at 44.93 seconds and 500 metres at 1:00.9 seconds.
- 1971 – Jenkins broke iconic Scottish Olympic sprint champion, Eric Liddell's, University of Edinburgh's 400-metre record of 47.6 seconds (world and Olympic record Paris, France 1924). A record Liddell held from 1924 until 1 May 1971 when Jenkins ran 46.4 seconds at Meadowbank. Jenkins' University record of 45.3 seconds (Europa Cup Semi-final Oslo, Norway, 1973) remains today.

== Drug smuggling conviction ==
Jenkins claimed that during his career he felt pressure to uphold high competitive standards, leading to his use of anabolic steroids. He said "It was the beginning of selling my soul, really."

In January 1986 Jenkins met with Juan Javier Macklis, who owned Laboratorios Milanos, a pharmaceutical plant in Tijuana, Mexico, that was contracted to supply medicines for the Mexican government. Together, Jenkins and Macklis manufactured anabolic steroids. With the help of Macklis' trusted colleagues, Jenkins then smuggled the drugs into the United States, which at the time was a felony. However, there was no precedent for a smuggling case of this magnitude, not to mention anabolic steroids had yet to be codified under the Controlled Substances Act in the U.S. A federal indictment filed in the U.S. Federal Courts in San Diego named Jenkins as the mastermind of a complex network of more than 33 steroid-dealing co-conspirators. In April 1987, weeks before federal prosecutors filed the indictment, Jenkins was arrested and later entered a guilty plea for the trafficking of steroids worth approximately $100 million through the Tijuana border crossing. It was reported that at one time Jenkins and co-conspirators Dan Duchaine and William Dillon were responsible for up to 70% of the steroids trafficked in the United States.

Jenkins was sentenced by Judge J. Lawrence Irving in US District Court San Diego to seven years in the Boron Federal Prison Camp in California's Mojave Desert. British newspaper The Independent reported that Jenkins became an informant and was thus able to be released after serving only 10 months and 15 days.

Admitting he "screwed up" by getting involved in the steroid-smuggling operation, while out on bail Jenkins became involved in a legal fitness enterprise. Referring to David Hemery, the gold medal winner of the 400 metres hurdles at the 1968 Summer Olympics in Mexico City, Jenkins told The Independent that "I sold him down the river, and that wasn't cool."

== Business career ==
During the late 1970s Jenkins began his commercial career as the sales director at Reebok International in Bolton Lancashire, England. There he was involved in product development and testing. In addition, in the late 1970s he met with and visited Paul Fireman, head of a US sporting goods distributor, in Boston introducing him to Reebok and helping establish the then embryonic brand in the United States.

In 1988, Jenkins started his nutrition company and began working on a protein powder, convinced that its muscle-building properties could be marketed as a healthy, legal alternative to steroids. This is when he created and launched Pro Optibol.

Combining his engineering degree and manufacturing knowledge with his passion for sports, Jenkins went to work developing whey-based powders.

=== NEXT Proteins ===
Jenkins is self-employed and an inventor within the United States sports nutrition industry and is an international multi-patent holder.

Jenkins founded and incorporated NEXT Nutrition, based in Carlsbad, California, in 1988.

In 1993 he set up a partnership with Dan Duchaine, a well known steroid guru and two-time convicted felon, and founded Next Proteins, a company which produced dietary supplements for athletes and bodybuilders. When Duchaine died Jenkins became the chairman of Next Nutrition.

Next Proteins, Inc. is the owner of the world's first carbonated protein drinks patents, issued in 41 countries.

In September 2006 NEXT Proteins sold its protein bar business and factory in Minden, Nevada to Forward Foods.

In April 2011 Jenkins sold the Designer Whey business including the protein powders, bars and shakes business to Designer Protein, LLC., a subsidiary of Athena Wellness Brands, LLC.

=== Publisher ===
Jenkins founded Xipe Press in 1996 and published the book Underground Bodyopus: Militant Weight Loss and Recomposition. The book was authored by two-time convicted felon Dan Duchaine. Duchaine, the self-styled "Steroid Guru" was an outspoken proponent of the use of drugs in sport and was credited with popularising the use of such illegal substances as GHB (4-Hydroxybutanoic acid) and Clenbuterol in American sport. After Duchaine's death Jenkins became CEO of DuChaine's drug supplement company and is the source of Jenkins' wealth today.

== Family ==
He is the brother of Roger Jenkins, also formerly an international athlete.
