= Drew McMaster =

Scottish sprinter (1957–2026)

Personal information
- Nationality: British (Scottish)
- Born: 10 May 1957 Edinburgh, Scotland
- Died: 4 November 2026 (aged 69) Edinburgh, Scotland
- Height: 166 cm (5 ft 5 in)
- Weight: 68 kg (150 lb)

Sport
- Sport: Athletics
- Event: Sprints
- Club: Edinburgh AC
Medal record
Men's athletics
Representing Scotland
Commonwealth Games
Gold medal – first place	1978 Edmonton	4 x 100 metres
Bronze medal – third place	1982 Brisbane	4 x 100 metres

Andrew Emlyn McMaster (10 May 1957 – 4 November 2026) was a Scottish sprinter who competed at the 1980 Summer Olympics.

== Biography ==
In 1976, he was Scottish, AAA's Indoor and junior 200 metres champion. He went on to win two further Scottish 200 metres titles in 1977 and 1978. Also in 1978, he went with the Scottish athletics team to the 1978 Commonwealth Games in Edmonton, Canada, where he won the 4x100 relay gold medal alongside David Jenkins, Allan Wells, and Cameron Sharp.

McMaster was runner up in the UK Athletics Championships over the 100 and 200 in 1978 and 1980 respectively and at the 1980 Olympics Games in Moscow, he represented Great Britain in the 100 metres, reaching the quarter-final and anchoring the British team in the sprint relay that finished 4th in the final, with a then British record of 38.62 seconds.

He became the British 100 metres champion after finishing third behind Mel Lattany and Ernest Obeng at the 1981 AAA Championships but by virtue of being the highest placed British athlete was considered the British champion. He also won the Scottish 100 metres championships in 1981 and 1982.

In 1982, he went to the 1982 Commonwealth Games in Brisbane, where he won a bronze medal with the sprint relay team, and also made it to the 100 metres final where he finished eighth.

His personal bests were 10.37 seconds for the 100 metres and 20.77 sec for the 200 metres.

In 1995, he admitted that he had taken performance-enhancing drugs. In 2016, McMaster revealed that he knew for certain that at least six other athletes did the same during the 1980s.

McMaster married fellow Scottish international athlete Elaine Davidson during Christmas 1979. He died in Edinburgh on 4 November 2026, aged 69.
