= Michael Paul (sprinter) =

Trinidad and Tobago sprinter

Mike Paul
Personal information
- Nationality: Trinidadian
- Born: 28 March 1957 (age 69) Malabar, Arima, Trinidad & Tobago
- Height: 185 cm (6 ft 1 in)
- Weight: 77 kg (170 lb)

Sport
- Sport: Athletics
- Event: 400m

Michael Paul (born 28 March 1957) is a retired athlete from Trinidad and Tobago who specialised in the 400 metres and 4 x 400 metres relay. He competed at the 1980 Summer Olympics and the 1984 Summer Olympics.

Paul first competed for the Texas Longhorns men's track and field team. Later, he competed for the Seton Hall Pirates track and field team.

Paul won the British AAA Championships title in the 400 metres event at the 1982 AAA Championships.

== Achievements ==
| Year | Tournament | Venue | Result | Extra |
|---|---|---|---|---|
| 1978 | Central American and Caribbean Games | Medellín, Colombia | 5th | 400 m |
| | Central American and Caribbean Games | Medellín, Colombia | 2nd | 4 × 400 m relay |
| 1978 | Central American and Caribbean Games | Medellín, Colombia | 5th | 400 m |
| 1984 | Olympic Games | Los Angeles, USA | 5th | 400m |
| 1986 | Central American and Caribbean Games | Santiago, Dom. Rep. | 4th | 400 m |
| | Central American and Caribbean Games | Santiago, Dom. Rep. | 5th | 4 × 100 m relay |
| | Central American and Caribbean Games | Santiago, Dom. Rep. | 2nd | 4 × 400 m relay |
