= Athletics at the 1978 Commonwealth Games =

Athletics at the 11th Commonwealth Games
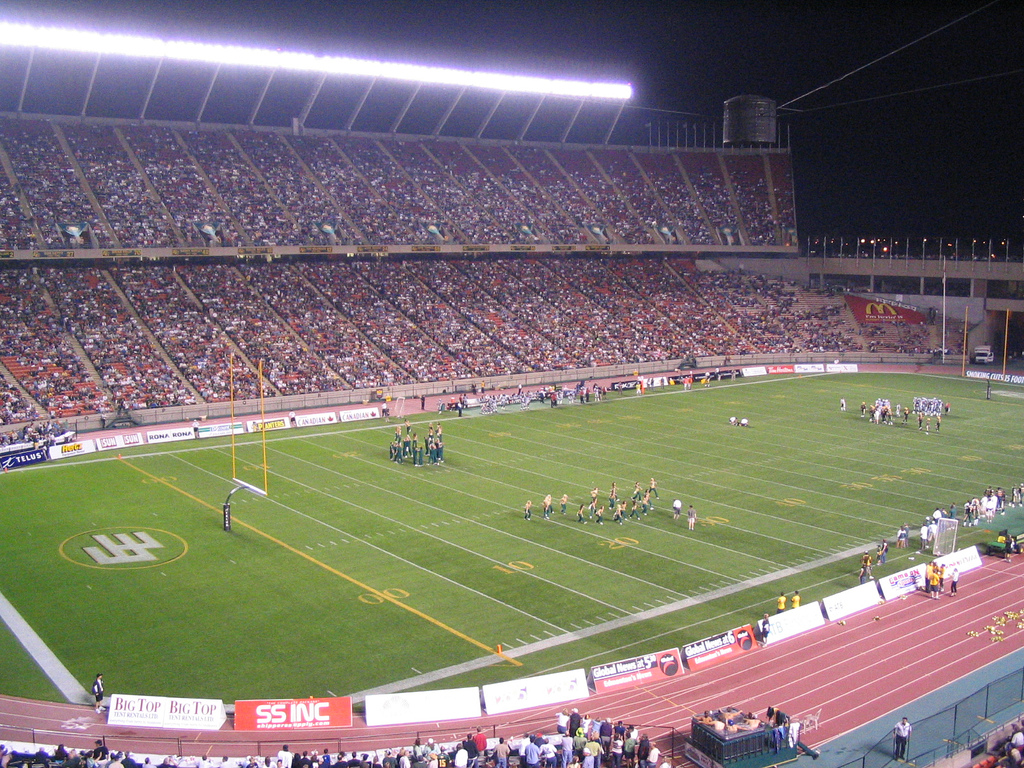
- Dates: 6–12 August 1978
- Host city: Edmonton, Alberta, Canada
- Venue: Commonwealth Stadium
- Level: Senior
- Events: 38
- Participation: 520 athletes from 39 nations
- Records set: 4 Games records

At the 1978 Commonwealth Games, the athletics events were held at the Commonwealth Stadium in Edmonton, Alberta, Canada. A total of 38 events were contested, 23 for men and 15 for women.

== Medal summary ==
=== Men ===
Event	Gold		Silver		Bronze	
100 metres (wind: +7.6 m/s)	Don Quarrie (JAM)	10.03 w	Allan Wells (SCO)	10.07 w	Hasely Crawford (TRI)	10.09 w
200 metres (wind: +4.4 m/s)	Allan Wells (SCO)	20.12 w	James Gilkes (GUY)	20.18 w	Colin Bradford (JAM)	20.43 w
400 metres	Rick Mitchell (AUS)	46.34	Joseph Coombs (TRI)	46.54	Glenn Bogue (CAN)	46.63
800 metres	Mike Boit (KEN)	1:46.39	Seymour Newman (JAM)	1:47.30	Peter Lemashon (KEN)	1:47.57
1500 metres	David Moorcroft (ENG)	3:35.48	Filbert Bayi (TAN)	3:35.59	John Robson (SCO)	3:35.60
5000 metres	Henry Rono (KEN)	13:23.04	Mike Musyoki (KEN)	13:29.92	Brendan Foster (ENG)	13:31.35
10,000 metres	Brendan Foster (ENG)	28:13.65	Mike Musyoki (KEN)	28:19.14	Mike McLeod (ENG)	28:34.30
Marathon	Gidamis Shahanga (TAN)	2:15:40	Jerome Drayton (CAN)	2:16:14	Paul Bannon (CAN)	2:16:52
3000 metres steeplechase	Henry Rono (KEN)	8:26.54	James Munyala (KEN)	8:32.21	Kip Rono (KEN)	8:34.07
110 metres hurdles (wind: +6.2 m/s)	Berwyn Price (WAL)	13.70 w	Max Binnington (AUS)	13.73 w	Warren Parr (AUS)	13.73 w
400 metres hurdles	Daniel Kimaiyo (KEN)	49.48	Garry Brown (AUS)	50.04	Alan Pascoe (ENG)	50.09
4 × 100 metres relay	Scotland; Allan Wells; David Jenkins; Cameron Sharp; Drew McMaster	39.24	Trinidad and Tobago; Edwin Noel; Hasely Crawford; Christopher Brathwaite; Ephraim Serrette	39.29	Jamaica; Errol Quarrie; Colin Bradford; Oliver Heywood; Floyd Brown	39.33
4 × 400 metres relay	Kenya; Washington Njiri; Daniel Kimaiyo; Bill Koskei; Joel Ngetich	3:03.54	Jamaica; Clive Barriffe; Bertland Cameron; Colin Bradford; Floyd Brown; Seymour Newman*	3:04.00	Australia; John Higham; Chum Darvall; Garry Brown; Rick Mitchell	3:04.23
30 kilometres walk	Olly Flynn (ENG)	2:22:04	Willi Sawall (AUS)	2:22:59	Tim Erickson (AUS)	2:26:34
High jump	Claude Ferragne (CAN)	2.20 m	Greg Joy (CAN)	2.18 m	Dean Bauck (CAN); Brian Burgess (SCO)	2.15 m
Pole vault	Bruce Simpson (CAN)	5.10 m	Don Baird (AUS)	5.10 m	Brian Hooper (ENG)	5.00 m
Long jump	Roy Mitchell (ENG)	8.06 m (w)	Chris Commons (AUS)	8.04 m (w)	Suresh Babu (IND)	7.94 m (w)
Triple jump	Keith Connor (ENG)	17.21 m (w)	Ian Campbell (AUS)	16.93 m (w)	Aston Moore (ENG)	16.69 m
Shot put	Geoff Capes (ENG)	19.77 m	Bruno Pauletto (CAN)	19.33 m	Bishop Dolegiewicz (CAN)	18.45 m
Discus throw	Borys Chambul (CAN)	59.70 m	Brad Cooper (BAH)	57.30 m	Rob Gray (CAN)	55.48 m
Hammer throw	Peter Farmer (AUS)	71.10 m	Scott Neilson (CAN)	69.92 m	Chris Black (SCO)	68.14 m
Javelin throw	Phil Olsen (CAN)	84.00 m	Mike O'Rourke (NZL)	83.18 m	Peter Yates (ENG)	78.58 m
Decathlon	Daley Thompson (ENG)	8467 pts	Peter Hadfield (AUS)	7623 pts	Alan Drayton (ENG)	7484 pts

=== Women ===
Event	Gold		Silver		Bronze	
100 metres (wind: +2.9 m/s)	Sonia Lannaman (ENG)	11.27 w	Raelene Boyle (AUS)	11.35 w	Denise Boyd (AUS)	11.37 w
200 metres (wind: +5.1 m/s)	Denise Boyd (AUS)	22.82 w	Sonia Lannaman (ENG)	22.89 w	Colleen Beazley (AUS)	22.93 w
400 metres	Donna Hartley (ENG)	51.69	Verona Elder (ENG)	52.94	Bethanie Nail (AUS)	53.06
800 metres	Judy Peckham (AUS)	2:02.82	Tekla Chemabwai (KEN)	2:02.87	Jane Colebrook (ENG)	2:03.10
1500 metres	Mary Stewart (ENG)	4:06.34 GR	Chris Benning (ENG)	4:07.53	Penny Werthner (CAN)	4:08.14
3000 metres	Paula Fudge (ENG)	9:12.95	Heather Thomson (NZL)	9:20.69	Ann Ford (ENG)	9:24.05
100 metres hurdles (wind: +3.6 m/s)	Lorna Boothe (ENG)	12.98w	Shirley Strong (ENG)	13.08w	Sharon Colyear (ENG)	13.17w
4 × 100 metres relay	England; Beverley Goddard; Kathy Smallwood; Sharon Colyear; Sonia Lannaman	43.70	Canada; Angela Bailey; Margaret Howe; Marjorie Bailey; Patty Loverock	44.26	Australia; Colleen Beazley; Denise Boyd; Lyn Jacenko; Roxanne Gelle	44.78
4 × 400 metres relay	England; Ruth Kennedy; Joslyn Hoyte; Verona Elder; Donna Hartley	3:27.19 GR	Australia; Bethanie Nail; Denise Boyd; Maxine Corcoran; Judy Peckham	3:28.65	Canada; Anne Mackie-Morelli; Debbie Campbell; Margaret Stride; Rachelle Campbell	3:35.83
High jump	Katrina Gibbs (AUS)	1.93 m GR	Debbie Brill (CAN)	1.90 m	Julie White (CAN)	1.83 m
Long jump	Sue Reeve (ENG)	6.59 m	Erica Hooker (AUS)	6.58 m	June Griffith (GUY)	6.52 m
Shot put	Gael Mulhall (AUS)	17.31 m	Carmen Ionesco (CAN)	16.45 m	Judy Oakes (ENG)	16.14 m
Discus throw	Carmen Ionesco (CAN)	62.16 m	Gael Mulhall (AUS)	57.60 m	Lucette Moreau (CAN)	56.64 m
Javelin throw	Tessa Sanderson (ENG)	61.34 m	Alison Hayward (CAN)	54.52 m	Laurie Kern (CAN)	53.60 m
Pentathlon	Diane Konihowski (CAN)	4768 pts GR	Sue Mapstone (ENG)	4222 pts	Yvette Wray (ENG)	4211 pts

== Medal table ==
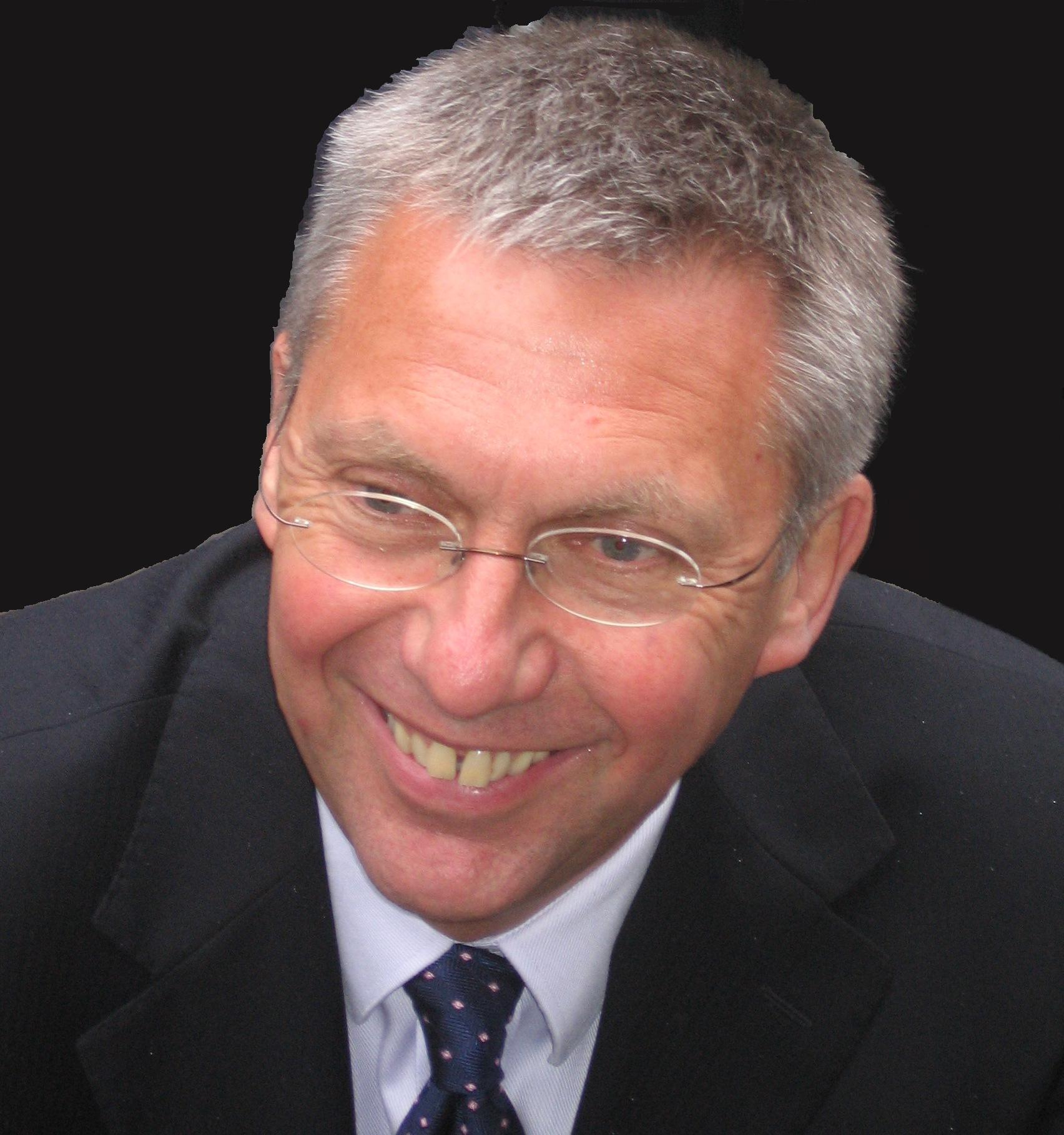
England's Dave Moorcroft won the men's 1500 metres.

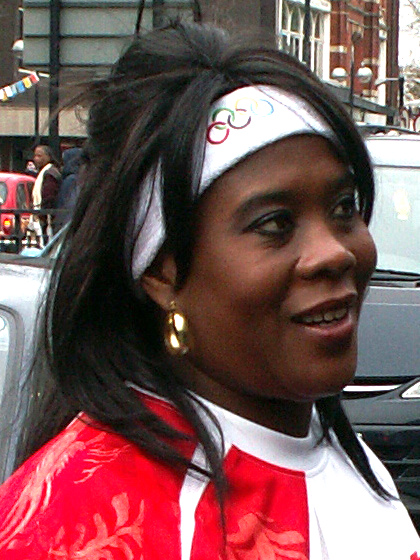
Tessa Sanderson won her first major javelin title.

* Host nation (Canada)

Rank	Nation	Gold	Silver	Bronze	Total
1	England (ENG)	16	5	12	33
2	Australia (AUS)	6	11	7	24
3	Canada (CAN)*	6	8	10	24
4	Kenya (KEN)	5	4	2	11
5	Scotland (SCO)	2	1	3	6
6	Jamaica (JAM)	1	2	2	5
7	Tanzania (TAN)	1	1	0	2
8	Wales (WAL)	1	0	0	1
9	Trinidad and Tobago (TRI)	0	2	1	3
10	New Zealand (NZL)	0	2	0	2
11	Guyana (GUY)	0	1	1	2
12	Bahamas (BAH)	0	1	0	1
13	India (IND)	0	0	1	1
Totals (13 entries)		38	38	39	115

== Participating nations ==
- Antigua and Barbuda (5)
- Australia (44)
- Bahamas (6)
- Bangladesh (1)
- Barbados (6)
- Belize (1)
- Bermuda (19)
- Canada (78)
- Cayman Islands (2)
- Cyprus (1)
- England (87)
- Gambia (10)
- Ghana (16)
- Gibraltar (3)
- Grenada (2)
- Guyana (3)
- India (9)
- Isle of Man (6)
- Jamaica (20)
- Jersey (1)
- Kenya (45)
- Lesotho (8)
- Malaysia (5)
- Mauritius (5)
- New Zealand (28)
- Northern Ireland (13)
- Saint Kitts and Nevis (2)
- Saint Lucia (6)
- Saint Vincent and the Grenadines (4)
- Scotland (25)
- Sierra Leone (3)
- Singapore (1)
- Sri Lanka (1)
- Swaziland (1)
- Tanzania (16)
- Trinidad and Tobago (12)
- Turks and Caicos Islands (5)
- Wales (16)
- Zambia (4)
