= Athletics at the 1976 Summer Olympics – Men's 4 × 100 metres relay =

Men's 4 × 100 metres relay at the Games of the XXI Olympiad
- Venue: Olympic Stadium
- Dates: 30 July & 31 July 1976
- Competitors: from 20 nations

Medalists
1st place, gold medalist(s)		Harvey Glance, Johnny Jones, Millard Hampton, Steve Riddick	United States
2nd place, silver medalist(s)		Manfred Kokot, Jörg Pfeifer, Klaus-Dieter Kurrat, Alexander Thieme	East Germany
3rd place, bronze medalist(s)		Aleksandr Aksinin, Nikolay Kolesnikov, Juris Silovs, Valeriy Borzov	Soviet Union

These are the official results of the men's 4 × 100 metres relay event at the 1976 Summer Olympics in Montreal, Quebec, Canada. The event was held on 30 and 31 July 1976. There were a total number of 20 nations competing.

== Medalists ==
Gold	Silver	Bronze
United States; Harvey Glance; Johnny Jones; Millard Hampton; Steve Riddick	East Germany; Manfred Kokot; Jörg Pfeifer; Klaus-Dieter Kurrat; Alexander Thieme	Soviet Union; Aleksandr Aksinin; Nikolay Kolesnikov; Juris Silovs; Valeriy Borzov

== Records ==
These were the standing World and Olympic records (in seconds) prior to the 1976 Summer Olympics.

World record	38.19	(United States) Larry Black (United States) Robert Taylor (United States) Gerald Tinker (United States) Eddie Hart	Munich (FRG)	September 10, 1972
Olympic record	38.19	(United States) Larry Black (United States) Robert Taylor (United States) Gerald Tinker (United States) Eddie Hart	Munich (FRG)	September 10, 1972

== Results ==
=== Final ===
- Held on 31 July 1976

RANK	NATION	ATHLETES	TIME
Gold medal	United States	• Harvey Glance • Johnny Jones • Millard Hampton • Steve Riddick	38.33
Silver medal	East Germany	• Manfred Kokot • Jörg Pfeifer • Klaus-Dieter Kurrat • Alexander Thieme	38.66
Bronze medal	Soviet Union	• Aleksandr Aksinin • Nikolay Kolesnikov • Juris Silovs • Valeriy Borzov	38.78
4.	Poland	• Andrzej Świerczyński • Marian Woronin • Bogdan Grzejszczak • Zenon Licznerski	38.83
5.	Cuba	• Francisco Gomez • Alejandro Casanas • Hermes Ramirez • Silvio Leonard	39.01
6.	Italy	• Vincenzo Guerini • Luciano Caravani • Luigi Benedetti • Pietro Mennea	39.08
7.	France	• Jean-Claude Amoureux • Joseph Arame • Lucien Sainte-Rose • Dominique Chauvelot	39.16
8.	Canada	• Hugh Spooner • Marvin Nash • Albin Dukowski • Hugh Fraser	39.47

=== Semifinals ===
- Held on 30 July 1976

==== Heat 1 ====
RANK	NATION	ATHLETES	TIME
1.	United States	• Harvey Glance • Johnny Jones • Millard Hampton • Steve Riddick	38.51
2.	Cuba	• Francisco Gomez • Alejandro Casanas • Hermes Ramirez • Silvio Leonard	39.25
3.	East Germany	• Manfred Kokot • Jörg Pfeifer • Klaus-Dieter Kurrat • Alexander Thieme	39.43
4.	Canada	• Hugh Spooner • Marvin Nash • Albin Dukowski • Hugh Fraser	39.46
5.	Bermuda	• Michael Sharpe • Dennis Trott • Calvin Dill • Gregory Simons	39.78
6.	Trinidad and Tobago	• Anthony Husbands • Chris Brathwaite • Charles Joseph • Francis Adams	39.88
7.	Ivory Coast	• Kraarsene Konan • Georges Kablan Degnan • Gastom Kouadio • Meite Amadou	40.64
8.	Thailand	• Anat Ratanapol • Suchart Jairsuraparp • Somsakdi Boontud • Sayan Paratanavong	40.68

==== Heat 2 ====
RANK	NATION	ATHLETES	TIME
1.	Poland	• Andrzej Świerczyński • Marian Woronin • Bogdan Grzejszczak • Zenon Licznerski	39.09
2.	France	• Jean-Claude Amoureux • Joseph Arame • Lucien Sainte-Rose • Dominique Chauvelot	39.33
3.	Soviet Union	• Aleksandr Aksinin • Nikolay Kolesnikov • Juris Silovs • Valeriy Borzov	39.36
4.	Italy	• Vincenzo Guerini • Luciano Caravani • Luigi Benedetti • Pietro Mennea	39.39
5.	West Germany	• Klaus Ehl • Klaus-Dieter Bieler • Dieter Steinmann • Reinhard Borchert	39.58
6.	Senegal	• Christian Dorosario • Momar Ndao • Barka Sy • Adama Fall	40.37
7.	Bahamas	• Danny Smith • Walter Callander • Clive Sands • Leonard Jervis	40.53
—	Spain	• José Luis Sánchez Paraíso • Luis Sarría • Francisco Garcia Lopez • Javier Martinez	DQ

=== Heats ===
==== Heat 1 ====
RANK	NATION	ATHLETES	TIME
1.	United States	• Harvey Glance • Johnny Jones • Millard Hampton • Steve Riddick	38.76
2.	Italy	• Vincenzo Guerini • Luciano Caravani • Luigi Benedetti • Pietro Mennea	39.35
3.	Poland	• Andrzej Świerczyński • Marian Woronin • Bogdan Grzejszczak • Zenon Licznerski	39.41
4.	Bermuda	• Michael Sharpe • Dennis Trott • Calvin Dill • Gregory Simons	39.90
5.	Spain	• José Luis Sánchez Paraíso • Luis Sarría • Francisco Garcia Lopez • Javier Martínez	39.93
6.	Ivory Coast	• Arsène Kra Konan • Georges Kablan Degnan • Gastom Kouadio • Meite Amadou	40.23
7.	Antigua and Barbuda	• Calvin Greenaway • Paul Richards • Everton Cornelius • Elroy Turner	41.84

==== Heat 2 ====
RANK	NATION	ATHLETES	TIME
1.	East Germany	• Manfred Kokot • Jörg Pfeifer • Klaus-Dieter Kurrat • Alexander Thieme	39.42
2.	West Germany	• Klaus Ehl • Klaus Bieler • Dieter Steinmann • Reinhard Borchert	39.63
3.	Soviet Union	• Aleksandr Aksinin • Nikolay Kolesnikov • Juris Silovs • Valeriy Borzov	39.98
4.	Senegal	• Christian Dorosario • Momar N'Dao • Barka Sy • Adama Fall	40.40
5.	Thailand	• Anat Ratanapol • Suchart Chairsuvaparb • Somsak Boontud • Sayan Paratanavong	40.53
6.	Kuwait	• Abdul Aziz Abdul Kareem • Abdul Kareem Al-Awad • Ibrahim Al-Rabeeah • Abdul Latif Abbas	41.61
7.	Saudi Arabia	• Mohamed Al-Sehly • Mohamed Ali Al-Malky • Salem Khalifa • Hamed Ali	42.00

==== Heat 3 ====
RANK	NATION	ATHLETES	TIME
1.	Cuba	• Francisco Gómez • Alejandro Casañas • Hermes Ramírez • Silvio Leonard	39.54
2.	France	• Jean-Claude Amoureux • Joseph Arame • Lucien Sainte-Rose • Dominique Chauvelot	39.71
3.	Canada	• Hugh Spooner • Marvin Nash • Al Dukowski • Hugh Fraser	39.72
4.	Trinidad and Tobago	• Anthony Husbands • Chris Brathwaite • Charles Joseph • Frank Adams	40.08
5.	Bahamas	• Danny Smith • Walter Callander • Clive Sands • Leonard Jervis	40.47
6.	Barbados	• Rawle Clarke • Hamil Grimes • Pearson Jordan • Pearson Trotman	41.15
