= Athletics at the 1975 Pan American Games – Men's 4 × 100 metres relay =

Men's 4 × 100 metres relay at the Pan American Games

The men's 4 × 100 metres relay event at the 1975 Pan American Games was held in Mexico City on 18 and 20 October.

== Medallists ==
Gold	Silver	Bronze
United States; Clancy Edwards; Larry Brown; Donald Merrick; Bill Collins	Cuba; Hermes Ramírez; Alejandro Casañas; Pablo Montes; José Triana	Canada; Hugh Fraser; Marvin Nash; Albin Dukowski; Robert Martin

== Results ==
=== Heats ===
Rank	Heat	Nation	Athletes	Time	Notes
1	1	Cuba	Hermes Ramírez, Alejandro Casañas, Pablo Montes, José Triana	38.62	Q, GR
2	1	Canada	Hugh Fraser, Marvin Nash, Albin Dukowski, Robert Martin	39.02	Q
3	2	United States	Clancy Edwards, Larry Brown, Donald Merrick, Bill Collins	39.19	Q
4	1	Brazil	Ronaldo Lobato, Nelson dos Santos, João Carlos de Oliveira, Rui da Silva	39.36	Q
5	1	Trinidad and Tobago	Rudy Reid, Christopher Brathwaite, Hasely Crawford, Charles Joseph	39.51	Q
6	1	Bahamas	Walter Callender, Danny Smith, Rudy Levarity, Fletcher Lewis	39.81	
7	2	Guyana	Clifton Schultz, Aubrey Wilson, Dennis Collison, James Gilkes	39.86	Q
8	2	Puerto Rico	Jesús Rohena, Iván Mangual, Juan Franceschi, Arnaldo Bristol	39.95	Q
9	2	Dominican Republic	Miguel Savinón, Gregorio García, Enrique Almarante, Félix López	40.00	Q
10	2	Bermuda	Mike Sharpe, Dennis Trott, Glenn Lake, Gregory Simons	40.34	
11	2	Jamaica	Alfred Daley, Henry Jackson, Overton Spence, Rupert Wynter	40.69	
12	1	Netherlands Antilles	Edsel Trumpet, Raymond Heerenveen, Siegfried Regales, Edsel Nahr	40.77	

=== Final ===
Rank	Nation	Athletes	Time	Notes
1st place, gold medalist(s)	United States	Clancy Edwards, Larry Brown, Donald Merrick, Bill Collins	38.31	GR
2nd place, silver medalist(s)	Cuba	Hermes Ramírez, Alejandro Casañas, Pablo Montes, José Triana	38.46	
3rd place, bronze medalist(s)	Canada	Hugh Fraser, Marvin Nash, Albin Dukowski, Robert Martin	38.86	
4	Brazil	Ronaldo Lobato, Nelson dos Santos, João Carlos de Oliveira, Rui da Silva	39.18	
5	Trinidad and Tobago	Rudy Reid, Christopher Brathwaite, Hasely Crawford, Charles Joseph	39.25	
6	Guyana	Clifton Schultz, Aubrey Wilson, Dennis Collison, James Gilkes	39.59	NR
7	Dominican Republic	Miguel Savinón, Gregorio García, Enrique Almarante, Félix López	39.73	
8	Puerto Rico	Jesús Rohena, Iván Mangual, Juan Franceschi, Arnaldo Bristol	39.80	
