= Athletics at the 1975 Summer Universiade – Men's 4 × 100 metres relay =

The men's 4 × 100 metres relay event at the 1975 Summer Universiade was held at the Stadio Olimpico in Rome on 20 and 21 September.

== Results ==
=== Heats ===
Rank	Heat	Nation	Athletes	Time	Notes
1	2	Soviet Union	Nikolay Kolesnikov, Juris Silovs, Sergey Vladimirtsev, Aleksandr Zhidkikh	39.73	Q
2	1	Canada	Marvin Nash, Albin Dukowski, Robert Martin, Brian Sanders	39.92	Q
3	1	Romania	Toma Petrescu, Claudiu Suselescu, Gheorghe Dulgheru, Petru Szekernyes	40.10	Q
4	1	France	René Metz, Jean-François Bonheme, Charles Ducasse, Lucien Sainte-Rose	40.33	Q
5	2	Poland	Andrzej Świerczyński, Grzegorz Cybulski, Jan Alończyk, Grzegorz Mądry	40.34	Q
6	2	Italy	Luciano Caravani, Stefano Rasori, Luigi Benedetti, Pasqualino Abeti	40.35	Q
7	1	West Germany	Klaus-Dieter Bieler, Klaus Ehl, Reinhard Borchert, Dieter Steinmann	40.39	q
8	2	Austria	Günther Würfel, Georg Regner, Peter Matejka, Alex Fortelny	41.03	q
9	1	Kuwait	Abdulaziz Al-Hadba, Abdullatif Yusuf Hashem, Saleh Mubarak Faraj, Mohamed Kamal	41.95	
10	1	Thailand	S. Sotaravat, Suchart Chairsuvaparb, Supanit Wongsalunkarn, Chaiyasit Vejchpong	42.17	
11	2	Honduras	Carlos Velázques, Rodolfo Lanez, Carlos Rosales, Carlos Mejía	46.04	

=== Final ===
Rank	Nation	Athletes	Time	Notes
1st place, gold medalist(s)	Soviet Union	Nikolay Kolesnikov, Juris Silovs, Sergey Vladimirtsev, Aleksandr Zhidkikh	39.80	
2nd place, silver medalist(s)	Canada	Marvin Nash, Albin Dukowski, Robert Martin, Brian Sanders	40.06	
3rd place, bronze medalist(s)	West Germany	Klaus-Dieter Bieler, Klaus Ehl, Reinhard Borchert, Dieter Steinmann	40.20	
4	Italy	Luciano Caravani, Stefano Rasori, Luigi Benedetti, Pasqualino Abeti	40.42	
5	France	René Metz, Jean-François Bonheme, Charles Ducasse, Lucien Sainte-Rose	40.49	
6	Poland	Jan Alończyk, Andrzej Świerczyński, Grzegorz Cybulski, Grzegorz Mądry	40.66	
7	Austria	Peter Matejka, Alex Fortelny, Georg Regner, Günther Würfel	41.45	
8	Romania	Gheorghe Dulgheru, Claudiu Suselescu, Toma Petrescu, Petru Szekernyes	42.04	
