= Athletics at the 1978 Commonwealth Games – Men's 4 × 100 metres relay =

Men's 4 × 100 metres relay at the Commonwealth Games

The men's 4 × 100 metres relay event at the 1978 Commonwealth Games was held on 11 and 12 August at the Commonwealth Stadium in Edmonton, Alberta, Canada.

== Medalists ==
Gold	Silver	Bronze
Scotland; David Jenkins; Allan Wells; Cameron Sharp; Drew McMaster	Trinidad and Tobago; Edwin Noel; Hasely Crawford; Christopher Brathwaite; Ephraim Serrette	Jamaica; Errol Quarrie; Colin Bradford; Oliver Heywood; Floyd Brown

== Results ==
=== Heats ===
Qualification: First 3 teams of each heat (Q) plus the next 2 fastest (q) qualified for the final.

Rank	Heat	Nation	Athletes	Time	Notes
1	1	Canada	Desai Williams, Hugh Fraser, Marvin Nash, Cole Doty	39.83	Q
2	1	Trinidad and Tobago	Edwin Noel, Hasely Crawford, Christopher Brathwaite, Ephraim Serrette	39.92	Q
2	2	Ghana	Albert Lomotey, Ernest Obeng, George Enchill, Ohene Karikari	39.92	Q
4	1	Scotland	David Jenkins, Allan Wells, Cameron Sharp, Drew McMaster	39.96	Q
5	2	Jamaica	Errol Quarrie, Colin Bradford, Oliver Heywood, Floyd Brown	40.03	Q
6	1	England	Brian Green, Timothy Bonsor, Leslie Hoyte, Trevor Hoyte	40.36	q
7	2	Australia	Don Wright, Paul Narracott, Maxwell Binnington, Richard Hopkins	40.61	Q
8	2	Bermuda	Calvin Dill, Dennis Trott, Gregory Simons, Kimberley Wade	40.74	q
9	2	Kenya	Alex Mutunga, John Mwebi, Peter Kipkirong, Tochi Mochache	41.17	
10	1	New Zealand	Bevan Smith, Graeme French, Phillip Mills, Ross Pownall	41.40	
11	1	Gambia	Banana Jarju, Bamba Njie, Bambo Fatty, Ousman N'Dure	43.17	

=== Final ===
Rank	Lane	Nation	Athletes	Time	Notes
1st place, gold medalist(s)	7	Scotland	David Jenkins, Allan Wells, Cameron Sharp, Drew McMaster	39.24	NR
2nd place, silver medalist(s)	4	Trinidad and Tobago	Edwin Noel, Hasely Crawford, Christopher Brathwaite, Ephraim Serrette	39.29	
3rd place, bronze medalist(s)	8	Jamaica	Errol Quarrie, Colin Bradford, Oliver Heywood, Floyd Brown	39.33	
4	3	Canada	Desai Williams, Hugh Fraser, Marvin Nash, Cole Doty	39.60	
5	1	Ghana	Albert Lomotey, Ernest Obeng, George Enchill, Ohene Karikari	39.73	
6	5	England	Brian Green, Timothy Bonsor, Leslie Hoyte, Trevor Hoyte	40.05	
7	6	Australia	Don Wright, Paul Narracott, Maxwell Binnington, Richard Hopkins	40.24	
8	2	Bermuda	Calvin Dill, Dennis Trott, Gregory Simons, Kimberley Wade	40.33	
