= Athletics at the 1978 Commonwealth Games – Men's 100 metres =

Men's 100 metres at the 1978 Commonwealth Games
- Venue: Commonwealth Stadium
- Dates: 6-7 August
- Competitors: 43 from 23 nations
- Winning time: 10.03

Medalists
gold medal	Don Quarrie	Jamaica
silver medal	Allan Wells	Scotland
bronze medal	Hasely Crawford	Trinidad and Tobago

The men's 100 metres event at the 1978 Commonwealth Games was held on 6 and 7 August at the Commonwealth Stadium in Edmonton, Alberta, Canada.

== Results ==
=== Heats ===
Held on 6 August

Qualification: First 5 in each heat (Q) and the next 2 fastest (q) qualify for the quarterfinals.

Wind:
Heat 1: ? m/s, Heat 2: ? m/s, Heat 3: ? m/s, Heat 4: -1.3 m/s, Heat 5: ? m/s, Heat 6: ? m/s

Rank	Heat	Name	Nationality	Time	Notes
1	1	Don Quarrie	Jamaica	10.43	Q
2	4	Ernest Obeng	Ghana	10.47	Q
3	5	Hasely Crawford	Trinidad and Tobago	10.55	Q
3	6	Allan Wells	Scotland	10.55	Q
5	3	Christopher Brathwaite	Trinidad and Tobago	10.57	Q
5	5	Mike McFarlane	England	10.57	Q
7	1	Marvin Nash	Canada	10.59	Q
8	1	Ohene Karikari	Ghana	10.60	Q
9	6	Hugh Fraser	Canada	10.62	Q
10	5	Desai Williams	Canada	10.64	Q
11	2	James Gilkes	Guyana	10.65	Q
12	3	Rawle Clarke	Barbados	10.66	Q
13	3	Oliver Heywood	Jamaica	10.66	Q
14	6	George Enchill	Ghana	10.68	Q
15	6	Rickey Moxey	Bahamas	10.69	Q
16	3	Dennis Trott	Bermuda	10.70	Q
17	4	Paul Narracott	Australia	10.71	Q
18	2	Gregory Simons	Bermuda	10.78	Q
18	3	Cameron Sharp	Scotland	10.78	Q
20	4	Drew McMaster	Scotland	10.79	Q
21	4	Brian Green	England	10.80	Q
22	4	John Mwebi	Kenya	10.83	Q
23	5	Calvin Dill	Bermuda	10.86	Q
23	6	Leslie Hoyte	England	10.86	Q
25	2	Ephraim Serrette	Trinidad and Tobago	10.87	Q
25	5	Errol Quarrie	Jamaica	10.87	Q
27	1	Dave Roberts	Wales	10.88	Q
28	1	Ramaswamy Gnanasekharan	India	10.94	Q
28	2	Graeme French	New Zealand	10.94	Q
30	2	David Lukuba	Tanzania	10.96	Q
31	6	Bakary Jarju	Gambia	10.98	q
32	5	Mokam Mwita	Tanzania	11.06	q
33	6	Linus Ambrose	Saint Lucia	11.11	
34	1	Jean Charlotte	Mauritius	11.26	
35	2	Molapi Bambatha	Lesotho	11.27	
36	2	Francis Williams	Saint Vincent and the Grenadines	11.28	
37	3	Genevieve Nestor	Saint Lucia	11.34	
37	4	Mosharaf Shamin	Bangladesh	11.34	
39	5	Letseka Nchee	Lesotho	11.46	
40	3	Ousman N'Dure	Gambia	11.49	
41	4	Bamba N'Jie	Gambia	11.51	
42	1	Glenn Osborne	Saint Kitts and Nevis	11.62	
	3	Richard Hopkins	Australia	DNS	

=== Quarterfinals ===
Held on 6 August

Qualification: First 3 in each heat (Q) and the next 4 fastest (q) qualify for the semifinals.

Wind:
Heat 1: +0.9 m/s, Heat 2: +1.5 m/s, Heat 3: +1.4 m/s, Heat 4: -1.3 m/s

Rank	Heat	Name	Nationality	Time	Notes
1	2	Mike McFarlane	England	10.32	Q
1	3	Allan Wells	Scotland	10.32	Q
3	2	Hasely Crawford	Trinidad and Tobago	10.33	Q
4	2	Paul Narracott	Australia	10.35	Q
5	4	Don Quarrie	Jamaica	10.36	Q
6	1	James Gilkes	Guyana	10.38	Q
7	4	Ernest Obeng	Ghana	10.44	Q
8	3	Hugh Fraser	Canada	10.48	Q
9	1	Ohene Karikari	Ghana	10.51	Q
10	2	Dennis Trott	Bermuda	10.53	q
11	2	Marvin Nash	Canada	10.54	q
12	3	George Enchill	Ghana	10.57	Q
13	1	Oliver Heywood	Jamaica	10.58	Q
14	2	Rickey Moxey	Bahamas	10.60	q
15	1	Calvin Dill	Bermuda	10.63	q
15	4	Christopher Brathwaite	Trinidad and Tobago	10.63	Q
17	3	Ephraim Serrette	Trinidad and Tobago	10.64	
18	1	Cameron Sharp	Scotland	10.65	
18	2	Drew McMaster	Scotland	10.65	
20	1	Brian Green	England	10.68	
21	3	Gregory Simons	Bermuda	10.69	
22	2	Errol Quarrie	Jamaica	10.73	
22	4	Rawle Clarke	Barbados	10.73	
24	1	John Mwebi	Kenya	10.76	
24	4	Desai Williams	Canada	10.76	
26	1	David Lukuba	Tanzania	10.80	
27	4	Dave Roberts	Wales	10.84	
28	3	Leslie Hoyte	England	10.85	
29	3	Ramaswamy Gnanasekharan	India	10.86	
30	4	Bakary Jarju	Gambia	10.91	
31	4	Graeme French	New Zealand	10.98	
32	3	Mokam Mwita	Tanzania	11.02	

=== Semifinals ===
Held on 7 August

Qualification: First 4 in each semifinal (Q) qualify directly for the final.

Wind:
Heat 1: -0.3 m/s, Heat 2: +4.6 m/s

Rank	Heat	Name	Nationality	Time	Notes
1	2	Don Quarrie	Jamaica	10.19	Q
2	2	Hasely Crawford	Trinidad and Tobago	10.25	Q
3	1	Allan Wells	Scotland	10.31	Q
3	2	James Gilkes	Guyana	10.31	Q
5	2	Ernest Obeng	Ghana	10.32	Q
6	1	Mike McFarlane	England	10.43	Q
7	1	Paul Narracott	Australia	10.46	Q
8	2	George Enchill	Ghana	10.53	
9	1	Christopher Brathwaite	Trinidad and Tobago	10.54	Q
10	1	Hugh Fraser	Canada	10.55	
10	2	Rickey Moxey	Bahamas	10.55	
12	1	Dennis Trott	Bermuda	10.56	
13	1	Ohene Karikari	Ghana	10.56	
14	1	Oliver Heywood	Jamaica	10.69	
15	2	Calvin Dill	Bermuda	10.72	
	2	Marvin Nash	Canada	DNS	

=== Final ===
Held on 7 August

Wind: +7.6 m/s

Rank	Lane	Name	Nationality	Time	Notes
1st place, gold medalist(s)	8	Don Quarrie	Jamaica	10.03	
2nd place, silver medalist(s)	3	Allan Wells	Scotland	10.07	
3rd place, bronze medalist(s)	1	Hasely Crawford	Trinidad and Tobago	10.09	
4	4	James Gilkes	Guyana	10.15	
5	6	Mike McFarlane	England	10.29	
6	2	Paul Narracott	Australia	10.31	
7	5	Christopher Brathwaite	Trinidad and Tobago	10.32	
8	7	Ernest Obeng	Ghana	10.34	
