= 1975 Central American and Caribbean Championships in Athletics =

Held at the Estadio Francisco Montaner in Ponce, Puerto Rico

- Dates: 6–10 August
- Host city: Ponce, Puerto Rico
- Venue: Estadio Francisco Montaner

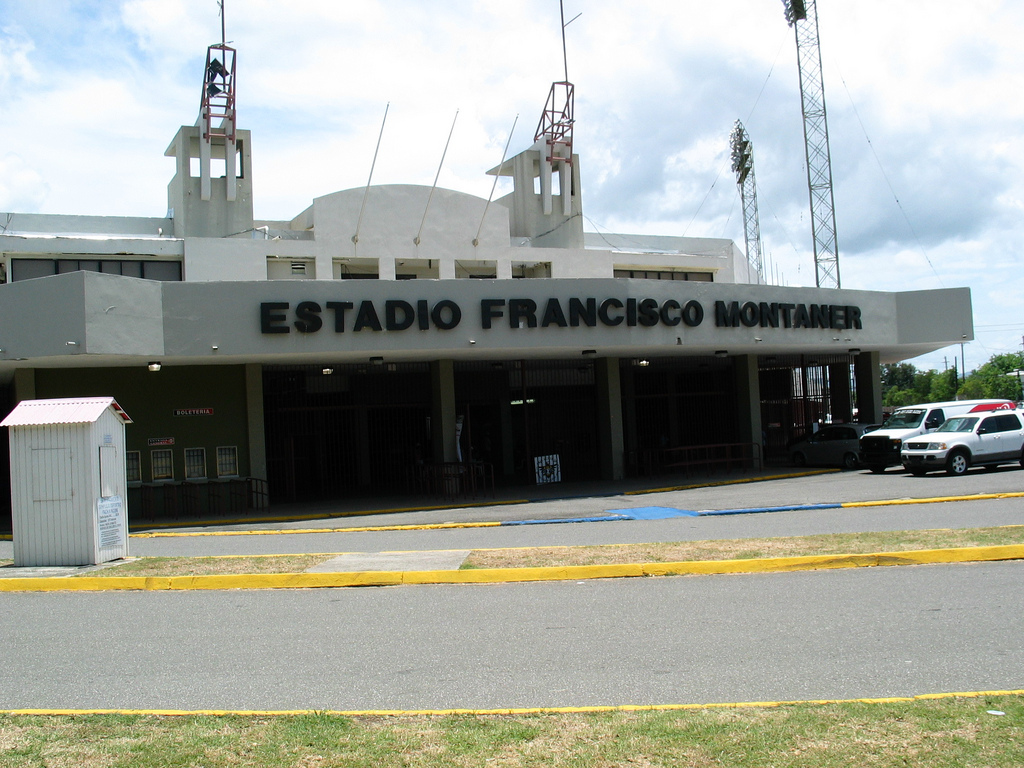
Host venue in Ponce.

The 1975 Central American and Caribbean Championships in Athletics were held at the Estadio Francisco Montaner in Ponce, Puerto Rico between 6–10 August.

== Medal summary ==
=== Men's events ===
Event	Gold		Silver		Bronze	
100 metres	Charles Joseph; Trinidad and Tobago	10.7	Pablo Franco; Puerto Rico	10.7	Félix Mata; Venezuela	10.7
200 metres	Don Quarrie; Jamaica	21.5	Pablo Franco; Puerto Rico	21.8	Raymond Heerenveen; Netherlands Antilles	
400 metres	Mike Sands; Bahamas	46.6	Félix Mangual; Puerto Rico	47.6	Alfred Daley; Jamaica	47.7
800 metres	Byron Dyce; Jamaica	1:58.1	José Velásquez; Venezuela	1:59.3	Garth Manwarring; Trinidad and Tobago	1:59.3
1500 metres	Carlos Martínez; Mexico	3:45.9 =CR	Antonio Colón; Puerto Rico	3:48.4	Byron Dyce; Jamaica	3:49.4
5000 metres	Luis Hernández; Mexico	15:04.7	Lucirio Garrido; Venezuela	15:04.8	Carlos Martínez; Mexico	15:19.0
10,000 metres	Rodolfo Gómez; Mexico	30:05.9	Rigoberto Mendoza; Cuba	30:07.1	Rafael Palomares; Mexico	30:18.3
Half marathon	Carlos Hernández; Mexico	1:07:52	Rigoberto Mendoza; Cuba	1:08:03	Andrés Romero; Mexico	1:08:41
400 metres hurdles	Iván Mangual; Puerto Rico	50.9 CR	José Santiago; Puerto Rico	51.8	Enrique Aguirre; Mexico	52.5
3000 metres steeplechase	Demetrio Cabanillos; Mexico	9:28.4	Octavio Guadarrama; Mexico	9:33.2	Carlos Báez; Puerto Rico	9:35.0
4 × 100 metres relay	Jamaica; Alfred Daley; Michael Fray; Don Quarrie; Colin Bradford	40.6	Trinidad and Tobago; Frank Adams; Christopher Brathwaite; Charles Joseph; Rudy Reid	40.7	Venezuela; Félix Mata; José Chacín; Esteban Manuel Briceno; Víctor Escobar	41.3
20 km road walk	Enrique Vera; Mexico	1:48:34	Domingo Colín; Mexico	1:54:30	Rigoberto Medina; Cuba	1:57:00
High jump	Cristóbal de León; Dominican Republic	2.05	Clark Godwin; Bermuda	2.05	Rudy Levarity; Bahamas	2.01
Pole vault	Augusto Perdomo; Cuba	4.70	Juan Laza; Cuba	4.55	Elberto Pratt; Mexico	4.40
Long jump	George Swanston; Trinidad and Tobago	7.48	Henry Jackson; Jamaica	7.24	Dennis Trott; Bermuda	7.20
Triple jump	Juan Velázquez; Cuba	16.11 CR	Juvenal Pérez; Cuba	15.66	Michael Sharpe; Bermuda	15.62
Shot put	Pedro Serrano; Puerto Rico	15.68	Jesús Ramos; Venezuela	15.55	José Santa Cruz; Cuba	14.82
Discus throw	Javier Moreno; Cuba	53.24	José Santa Cruz; Cuba	52.48	Pedro Serrano; Puerto Rico	47.24
Hammer throw	Víctor Suárez; Cuba	62.36	William Silén; Puerto Rico	58.20	Marcos Borregales; Venezuela	56.36
Javelin throw	Reinaldo Patterson; Cuba	69.84	Antonio González; Cuba	68.46	Salomón Robins; Mexico	68.24

=== Women's events ===
Event	Gold		Silver		Bronze	
100 metres	Debbie Jones; Bermuda	11.9	Eia Cabreja; Cuba	12.1	Lelieth Hodges; Jamaica	12.1
200 metres	Lorna Forde; Barbados	24.3	Jackie Pusey; Jamaica	24.4	Rosie Allwood; Jamaica	24.6
400 metres	Helen Blake; Jamaica	54.8	Lorna Forde; Barbados	55.1	Ruth Williams; Jamaica	55.7
800 metres	Helen Blake; Jamaica	2:17.5	Charlotte Bradley; Mexico	2:18.1	Mercedes Álvarez; Cuba	2:19.0
1500 metres	Charlotte Bradley; Mexico	4:34.1	Mercedes Álvarez; Cuba	4:44.7	Evasol Vallejo; Mexico	4:46.5
200 metres hurdles	Marcela Chivás; Cuba	28.2	Mercedes Román; Mexico	30.0	Linda Woodside; Bahamas	30.3
4 × 100 metres relay	Jamaica; Lelieth Hodges; Rosie Allwood; Carol Cummings; Jackie Pusey	45.7	Bermuda; Debbie Jones; Andrea Trott; Branwen Smith; Donna Burgess	47.4	Trinidad and Tobago; Janice Bernard; Esther Hope; Angela McLean; Jennifer Augustine	47.4
High jump	Andrea Bruce; Jamaica	1.83 CR	Lucía Duquet; Cuba	1.65	María Scrubb; Cuba	1.65
Long jump	Andrea Bruce; Jamaica	6.10 CR	Dora Thompson; Cuba	5.88	Shonel Ferguson; Bahamas	5.69
Shot put	Caridad Romero; Cuba	14.74 CR	Rosa Fernández; Cuba	14.33	Orlanda Lynch; Suriname	12.91
Discus throw	Caridad Romero; Cuba	45.56	Salvadora Vargas; Cuba	44.00	Patricia Andrus; Venezuela	39.38
Javelin throw	Ana María González; Cuba	45.90	Clementina Díaz; Cuba	42.78	Diana Rodríguez; Puerto Rico	41.84
Pentathlon	María Ángeles Cato; Mexico	3796	Maritza García; Cuba	3628	Mercedes Román; Mexico	3619

== Medal table ==
Rank	Nation	Gold	Silver	Bronze	Total
1	Cuba (CUB)	9	14	4	27
2	Mexico (MEX)	8	4	8	20
3	Jamaica (JAM)	8	2	5	15
4	Puerto Rico (PUR)	2	6	3	11
5	Trinidad and Tobago (TTO)	2	1	2	5
6	Bermuda (BER)	1	2	2	5
7	Barbados (BAR)	1	1	0	2
8	Bahamas (BAH)	1	0	3	4
9	Dominican Republic (DOM)	1	0	0	1
10	Venezuela (VEN)	0	3	4	7
11	Netherlands Antilles (AHO)	0	0	1	1
11	Suriname (NGY)	0	0	1	1
Totals (12 entries)		33	33	33	99
