= Bahamas at the 1976 Summer Olympics =

- Flag of the Bahamas
- IOC code: BAH
- NOC: Bahamas Olympic Committee

in Montreal Canada
- Competitors: 11 (10 men and 1 woman) in 3 sports
- Flag bearer: Mike Sands
- Medals: Gold 0 Silver 0 Bronze 0 Total 0

Summer Olympics appearances (overview)
- 1952; 1956; 1960; 1964; 1968; 1972; 1976; 1980; 1984; 1988; 1992; 1996; 2000; 2004; 2008; 2012; 2016; 2020; 2024

The Bahamas competed at the 1976 Summer Olympics in Montreal, Quebec, Canada. It was the first time it competed in the Olympics as an independent nation.

== Athletics ==
Men
Track & road events

Athlete	Event	Heat		Quarterfinal		Semifinal		Final	
Athlete	Event	Result	Rank	Result	Rank	Result	Rank	Result	Rank
Walter Callander	200 m	21.79	4 Q	21.78	6	Did not advance			
Leonard Jervis	100 m	10.87	7	Did not advance					
Clive Sands	100 m	10.82	6	Did not advance					
Clive Sands	200 m	DNF		Did not advance					
Mike Sands	100 m	10.65	4 Q	DNS		Did not advance			
Mike Sands	400 m	46.52	2 Q	46.48	6	Did not advance			
Danny Smith	110 m hurdles	14.13	6	Did not advance					
Danny Smith; Walter Callander; Clive Sands; Leonard Jervis	4×100 m relay	40.47	5 q	—		40.53	7	Did not advance	

Field events

Athlete	Event	Qualification		Final	
Athlete	Event	Distance	Position	Distance	Position
Fletcher Lewis	Long jump	7.73	12 q	7.61	11
Phil Robins	Triple jump	NM		Did not advance	

Women
Track & road events

Athlete	Event	Heat		Quarterfinal		Semifinal		Final	
Athlete	Event	Result	Rank	Result	Rank	Result	Rank	Result	Rank
Shonel Ferguson	100 m	12.26	28	Did not advance					

Field events

Athlete	Event	Qualification		Final	
Athlete	Event	Distance	Position	Distance	Position
Shonel Ferguson	Long jump	5.62	28	Did not advance	

== Sailing ==
Open

Athlete	Event	Race							Net points	Final rank
Athlete	Event	1	2	3	4	5	6	7	Net points	Final rank
Michael Russell	Finn	27	21	18	18	23	~~DNF~~	22	165.0	25

== Swimming ==
Men

Athlete	Event	Heat		Semifinal		Final	
Athlete	Event	Time	Rank	Time	Rank	Time	Rank
Andy Knowles	200 metre freestyle	2:00.18	42	Did not advance			
Andy Knowles	400 metre freestyle	4:10.78	36	Did not advance			
Bruce Knowles	100 metre breaststroke	1:11.65	30	Did not advance			

== See also ==
- Bahamas at the 1975 Pan American Games
