= Athletics at the 1976 Summer Olympics – Men's 100 metres =

Men's 100 metres at the Games of the XXI Olympiad
- Venue: Olympic Stadium; Montreal, Quebec, Canada
- Dates: July 23, 1976 (heats, quarterfinals); July 24, 1976 (semifinals, final)
- Competitors: 63 from 40 nations
- Winning time: 10.06 seconds

Medalists
1st place, gold medalist(s)		Hasely Crawford; Trinidad and Tobago
2nd place, silver medalist(s)		Don Quarrie; Jamaica
3rd place, bronze medalist(s)		Valeriy Borzov; Soviet Union

The men's 100 metres sprint event at the 1976 Olympic Games in Montreal, Quebec, Canada, was held at Olympic Stadium on July 23 and 24. Sixty-three athletes from 40 nations competed. Each nation was limited to 3 athletes per rules in force since the 1930 Olympic Congress. The event was won by 0.02 seconds by Hasely Crawford of Trinidad and Tobago, earning the nation's first gold medal and making Crawford a national hero. Don Quarrie's silver medal made Jamaica only the third country to reach the men's 100 metres podium three consecutive times (after the United States, which had streaks of 9 Games and 7 Games, and Great Britain, which had medaled consecutively in 1920, 1924, and 1928). Valeriy Borzov of the Soviet Union was unable to defend his title, but by taking bronze became the third man to medal twice in the event. For only the second time (after 1928), the United States did not have a medalist in the event.

In the preliminary rounds, all the top athletes were running times in the 10.30s to 10.40s, while by the semi-finals some times dropped to the 10.20s. They took the top 4 from each semi, so Steve Riddick was left out of the final even though he had run faster than Guy Abrahams in the earlier semi. With the #1 time from the semis, Hasely Crawford was still placed in lane 1, somewhat hidden from the other top contenders in the center of the track, including Harvey Glance, 200 metre specialist Don Quarrie and the defending champion Valeriy Borzov. From the gun, Borzov was out fast in lane 3 gaining a half a metre on Quarrie next to him in 4, with Glance another half metre behind Quarrie. As Quarrie slowly gained on Borzov, Crawford was also speeding down lane 1. Quarrie went past Borzov, but Crawford was already ahead for a narrow victory, the leaning Borzov holding off Glance.

== Background ==
This was the eighteenth time the event was held, having appeared at every Olympics since the first in 1896. Two finalists from 1972 returned: gold medal winner Valeriy Borzov of the Soviet Union and Hasely Crawford of Trinidad and Tobago, who had not finished the Munich final. The favorite was Jamaican Don Quarrie (1970 and 1974 Commonwealth Games champion, with a share of the world record at 9.9 seconds), particularly with American Steve Williams (who had run 9.9 seconds four times) having been injured at the U.S. Olympic trials. Borzov was "not the dominant sprinter he had been in 1972." The top American in Montreal was Harvey Glance, who had run the 9.9 second world record time twice. Cuban Silvio Leonard had also matched that time once.

Three nations appeared in the event for the first time: Barbados, Belize, and the Netherlands Antilles. The United States was the only nation to have appeared at each of the first eighteen Olympic men's 100 metres events.

== Competition format ==
The event retained the same basic four round format introduced in 1920: heats, quarterfinals, semifinals, and a final. The "fastest loser" system, introduced in 1968, was used again to ensure that the quarterfinals and subsequent rounds had exactly 8 runners per heat; this time, that system applied only in the preliminary heats.

The first round consisted of 9 heats, each with 6–8 athletes. The top three runners in each heat advanced, along with the next five fastest runners overall. This made 32 quarterfinalists, who were divided into 4 heats of 8 runners. The top four runners in each quarterfinal advanced, with no "fastest loser" places. The 16 semifinalists competed in two heats of 8, with the top four in each semifinal advancing to the eight-man final.

== Records ==
These are the standing world and Olympic records (in seconds) prior to the 1976 Summer Olympics.

World record	9.95	(United States) Jim Hines	Mexico City (MEX)	October 14, 1968
Olympic record	9.95	(United States) Jim Hines	Mexico City (MEX)	October 14, 1968

== Results ==
=== Heats ===
The heats were held on July 23, 1976.

==== Heat 1 ====
Rank	Athlete	Nation	Time	Notes
1	Hasely Crawford	Trinidad and Tobago	10.42	Q
2	Alexander Thieme	East Germany	10.64	Q
3	Luciano Caravani	Italy	10.66	Q
4	Lambert Micha	Belgium	10.69	
5	Gregory Simons	Bermuda	10.76	
6	Bjarni Stefánsson	Iceland	11.28	
—	Wavala Kali	Papua New Guinea	DNS	
—	Robert Martin	Canada	DNS	

==== Heat 2 ====
Rank	Athlete	Nation	Time	Notes
1	Johnny Lam Jones	United States	10.43	Q
2	Amadou Meïté	Ivory Coast	10.53	Q
3	Ainsley Armstrong	Trinidad and Tobago	10.59	Q
4	Mike Sharpe	Bermuda	10.70	
5	Dominique Chauvelot	France	10.79	
6	Mohamed Al-Sehly	Saudi Arabia	11.10	
7	Werner Bastians	West Germany	11.17	
8	Armando Padilla	Nicaragua	11.52	

==== Heat 3 ====
Rank	Athlete	Nation	Time	Notes
1	Petar Petrov	Bulgaria	10.46	Q
2	Zenon Licznerski	Poland	10.60	Q
3	Rui da Silva	Brazil	10.61	Q
4	Christer Garpenborg	Sweden	10.64	q
5	Jean-Claude Amoureux	France	10.75	
6	Abdul Kareem Al-Awad	Kuwait	11.27	
7	Ayoub Bodaghi	Iran	11.39	

==== Heat 4 ====
Rank	Athlete	Nation	Time	Notes
1	Don Quarrie	Jamaica	10.38	Q
2	Guy Abrahams	Panama	10.40	Q
3	Marvin Nash	Canada	10.59	Q
4	Mike Sands	Bahamas	10.65	q
5	Dennis Trott	Bermuda	10.67	q
6	Peter Fitzgerald	Australia	10.87	
7	Ronald Russell	Virgin Islands	11.22	

==== Heat 5 ====
Rank	Athlete	Nation	Time	Notes
1	Harvey Glance	United States	10.37	Q
2	Marian Woronin	Poland	10.56	Q
3	Aleksandr Aksinin	Soviet Union	10.60	Q
4	Colin Bradford	Jamaica	10.64	q
5	Pedro Ferrer	Puerto Rico	10.76	
6	Vasilios Papageorgopoulos	Greece	10.82	
7	Leonard Jervis	Bahamas	10.87	

==== Heat 6 ====
Rank	Athlete	Nation	Time	Notes
1	Klaus-Dieter Kurrat	East Germany	10.37	Q
2	Valeriy Borzov	Soviet Union	10.53	Q
3	Dieter Steinmann	West Germany	10.68	Q
4	Francisco Gómez	Cuba	10.68	q
5	Barka Sy	Senegal	10.81	
6	Masahide Jinno	Japan	10.94	
7	Colin Thurton	Belize	11.03	
8	Siegfried Regales	Netherlands Antilles	11.11	

==== Heat 7 ====
Rank	Athlete	Nation	Time	Notes
1	Steve Riddick	United States	10.43	Q
2	Andrzej Świerczyński	Poland	10.62	Q
3	Adama Fall	Senegal	10.72	Q
4	Suchart Chairsuvaparb	Thailand	10.75	
5	Roland Bombardella	Luxembourg	10.76	
6	Clive Sands	Bahamas	10.82	
7	Philippe Étienne	Haiti	11.05	

==== Heat 8 ====
Rank	Athlete	Nation	Time	Notes
1	Gilles Échevin	France	10.53	Q
2	Klaus Bieler	West Germany	10.58	Q
3	Anat Ratanapol	Thailand	10.71	Q
4	Hermes Ramírez	Cuba	10.72	
5	Momar N'Dao	Senegal	10.74	
6	Ramli Ahmad	Malaysia	10.98	
—	René Mberinguerer	Central African Republic	DNS	

==== Heat 9 ====
Rank	Athlete	Nation	Time	Notes
1	Sammy Monsels	Suriname	10.58	Q
2	Silvio Leonard	Cuba	10.62	Q
3	Juris Silovs	Soviet Union	10.70	Q
4	Chris Brathwaite	Trinidad and Tobago	10.71	
5	Endre Lépold	Hungary	10.82	
6	Pearson Jordan	Barbados	10.95	
7	Tony Moore	Fiji	11.16	

=== Quarterfinals ===
The quarterfinals were held on July 23, 1976.

==== Quarterfinal 1 ====
Rank	Athlete	Nation	Time	Notes
1	Don Quarrie	Jamaica	10.33	Q
2	Steve Riddick	United States	10.36	Q
3	Marvin Nash	Canada	10.48	Q
4	Aleksandr Aksinin	Soviet Union	10.55	Q
5	Dennis Trott	Bermuda	10.64	
6	Anat Ratanapol	Thailand	10.65	
7	Luciano Caravani	Italy	10.81	
8	Gilles Échevin|	France	12.00	

==== Quarterfinal 2 ====
Rank	Athlete	Nation	Time	Notes
1	Guy Abrahams	Panama	10.35	Q
2	Johnny Lam Jones	United States	10.46	Q
3	Alexander Thieme	East Germany	10.50	Q
4	Marian Woronin	Poland	10.53	Q
5	Silvio Leonard	Cuba	10.59	
6	Sammy Monsels	Suriname	10.61	
7	Colin Bradford	Jamaica	10.62	
8	Christer Garpenborg	Sweden	10.63	

==== Quarterfinal 3 ====
Rank	Athlete	Nation	Time	Notes
1	Hasely Crawford	Trinidad and Tobago	10.29	Q
2	Valeriy Borzov	Soviet Union	10.39	Q
3	Amadou Meïté	Ivory Coast	10.45	Q
4	Rui da Silva	Brazil	10.57	Q
5	Andrzej Świerczyński	Poland	10.59	
6	Adama Fall	Senegal	10.60	
7	Klaus Bieler	West Germany	10.80	
—	Mike Sands	Bahamas	DNS	

==== Quarterfinal 4 ====
Rank	Athlete	Nation	Time	Notes
1	Harvey Glance	United States	10.23	Q
2	Klaus-Dieter Kurrat	East Germany	10.29	Q
3	Petar Petrov	Bulgaria	10.30	Q
4	Ainsley Armstrong	Trinidad and Tobago	10.46	Q
5	Francisco Gómez	Cuba	10.49	
6	Zenon Licznerski	Poland	10.52	
7	Dieter Steinmann	West Germany	10.67	
—	Juris Silovs	Soviet Union	DNS	

=== Semifinals ===
The semifinals were held on July 24, 1976.

==== Semifinal 1 ====
Rank	Athlete	Nation	Time	Notes
1	Harvey Glance	United States	10.24	Q
2	Valeriy Borzov	Soviet Union	10.30	Q
3	Klaus-Dieter Kurrat	East Germany	10.30	Q
4	Guy Abrahams	Panama	10.37	Q
5	Marvin Nash	Canada	10.52	
6	Ainsley Armstrong	Trinidad and Tobago	10.52	
7	Rui da Silva	Brazil	10.54	
8	Marian Woronin	Poland	10.69	

==== Semifinal 2 ====
Rank	Athlete	Nation	Time	Notes
1	Hasely Crawford	Trinidad and Tobago	10.22	Q
2	Don Quarrie	Jamaica	10.26	Q
3	Johnny Lam Jones	United States	10.30	Q
4	Petar Petrov	Bulgaria	10.30	Q
5	Steve Riddick	United States	10.33	
6	Amadou Meïté	Ivory Coast	10.46	
7	Aleksandr Aksinin	Soviet Union	10.50	
8	Alexander Thieme	East Germany	10.50	

=== Final ===
The final was held on July 24, 1976.

Rank	Lane	Athlete	Nation	Time
1st place, gold medalist(s)	1	Hasely Crawford	Trinidad and Tobago	10.06
2nd place, silver medalist(s)	4	Don Quarrie	Jamaica	10.08
3rd place, bronze medalist(s)	3	Valeriy Borzov	Soviet Union	10.14
4	5	Harvey Glance	United States	10.19
5	8	Guy Abrahams	Panama	10.25
6	6	Johnny Lam Jones	United States	10.27
7	7	Klaus-Dieter Kurrat	East Germany	10.31
8	2	Petar Petrov	Bulgaria	10.35

== See also ==
- 1972 Men's Olympic 100 metres (Munich)
- 1978 Men's European Championships 100 metres (Prague)
- 1980 Men's Olympic 100 metres (Moscow)
