= Athletics at the 1975 Summer Universiade – Men's 100 metres =

The men's 100 metres event at the 1975 Summer Universiade was held at the Stadio Olimpico in Rome on 18 and 19 September.

The winning margin was 0.19 seconds which as of 2024 remains the greatest winning margin for the men's 100 metres at these championships since the introduction of fully automatic timing.

== Medalists ==
Gold	Silver	Bronze
Pietro Mennea; Italy	Charles Hopkins; United States	Toma Petrescu; Romania

== Results ==
=== Heats ===
Wind:
Heat 1: ? m/s, Heat 2: +1.0 m/s, Heat 3: +0.6 m/s, Heat 4: ? m/s

Rank	Heat	Athlete	Nationality	Time	Notes
1	2	Pietro Mennea	Italy	10.41	Q
2	1	Charles Hopkins	United States	10.50	Q
3	3	René Metz	France	10.56	Q
4	3	Nikolay Kolesnikov	Soviet Union	10.58	Q
5	1	Toma Petrescu	Romania	10.59	Q
5	3	Marvin Nash	Canada	10.59	
5	4	Klaus Ehl	West Germany	10.59	Q
8	3	Suchart Chairsuvaparb	Thailand	10.61	
9	2	Lucien Sainte-Rose	France	10.62	Q
10	4	Claudiu Suselescu	Romania	10.63	Q
11	1	Juris Silovs	Soviet Union	10.67	
12	4	Thorsten Johansson	Sweden	10.68	
13	1	Robert Martin	United States	10.74	
13	3	Roland Bombardella	Luxembourg	10.74	
15	3	Jan Alończyk	Poland	10.75	
16	1	Jorge Mathias	Brazil	10.77	
17	1	Andrzej Świerczyński	Poland	10.82	
18	2	Klaus-Dieter Bieler	West Germany	10.83	
19	3	Pasqualino Abeti	Italy	10.84	
20	4	Franco Fähndrich	Switzerland	10.87	
21	3	Arturo Godoy	Mexico	10.93	
22	2	Juan Jesús Sarrasqueta	Spain	10.96	
23	2	Abdulaziz Al-Hadba	Kuwait	10.99	
24	4	Babak Mahmoudian	Iran	11.11	
25	2	Philippe Étienne	Haiti	11.14	
26	1	Chaiyasit Vejchpong	Thailand	11.16	
27	2	José Cartas	Mexico	11.34	
28	2	Mohamed Kamal	Kuwait	11.58	

=== Final ===
Wind: 0.0 m/s

Rank	Athlete	Nationality	Time	Notes
1st place, gold medalist(s)	Pietro Mennea	Italy	10.28	GR
2nd place, silver medalist(s)	Charles Hopkins	United States	10.47	
3rd place, bronze medalist(s)	Toma Petrescu	Romania	10.66	
4	Nikolay Kolesnikov	Soviet Union	10.66	
5	René Metz	France	10.67	
6	Claudiu Suselescu	Romania	10.67	
7	Klaus Ehl	West Germany	10.72	
8	Lucien Sainte-Rose	France	10.74	
