= Athletics at the 1975 Pan American Games – Men's 200 metres =

Men's 200 metres at the Pan American Games

The men's 200 metres event at the 1975 Pan American Games was held in Mexico City on 15 and 16 October.

== Medalists ==
Gold	Silver	Bronze
James Gilkes; Guyana	Larry Brown; United States	Mike Sands; Bahamas

== Results ==
=== Heats ===
Wind:
Heat 1: 0.0 m/s, Heat 2: 0.0 m/s, Heat 3: -1.2 m/s, Heat 4: -1.1 m/s

Rank	Heat	Name	Nationality	Time	Notes
1	2	Larry Brown	United States	20.62	Q
2	2	Hugh Fraser	Canada	20.90	Q
3	3	Robert Martin	Canada	20.93	Q
4	1	Raymond Heerenveen	Netherlands Antilles	20.98	Q
5	3	Bill Collins	United States	20.99	Q
6	4	James Gilkes	Guyana	21.02	Q
7	4	Mike Sands	Bahamas	21.09	Q
8	1	Anthony Davis	Jamaica	21.12	Q
9	2	Pablo Montes	Cuba	21.18	Q
10	2	Félix López	Dominican Republic	21.24	Q
11	3	Christopher Brathwaite	Trinidad and Tobago	21.33	Q
12	3	Rudy Levarity	Bahamas	21.38	Q
13	1	Gregory Simons	Bermuda	21.41	Q
14	3	Gustavo Dubarbier	Argentina	21.61	
15	2	Hasely Crawford	Trinidad and Tobago	21.65	
16	1	Dennis Collison	Guyana	21.66	Q
17	2	Arturo Godoy	Mexico	21.80	
18	4	Jesús Rohena	Puerto Rico	21.86	Q
19	2	Henry Braafharp	Netherlands Antilles	22.17	
20	4	Ángel Guerreros	Paraguay	22.31	Q
21	2	Philippe Étienne	Haiti	22.33	
22	4	Ronald Russell	Virgin Islands	22.40	
23	3	Lionel Caero	Bolivia	22.61	
24	1	Melvin Ramírez	Guatemala	23.20	
	1	Enrique Almarante	Dominican Republic	DQ	
	4	Silvio Leonard	Cuba	DNS	

=== Semifinals ===
Wind:
Heat 1: -2.2 m/s, Heat 2: -2.0 m/s

Rank	Heat	Name	Nationality	Time	Notes
1	1	James Gilkes	Guyana	20.53	Q
2	2	Bill Collins	United States	20.64	Q
3	1	Larry Brown	United States	20.83	Q
4	2	Hugh Fraser	Canada	20.86	Q
5	1	Mike Sands	Bahamas	20.92	Q
6	2	Raymond Heerenveen	Netherlands Antilles	21.11	Q
7	2	Jesús Rohena	Puerto Rico	21.13	Q
8	2	Rudy Levarity	Bahamas	21.19	
9	2	Christopher Brathwaite	Trinidad and Tobago	21.21	
10	1	Pablo Montes	Cuba	21.25	Q
11	1	Anthony Davis	Jamaica	21.35	
12	2	Dennis Collison	Guyana	21.54	
13	1	Félix López	Dominican Republic	21.66	
14	1	Gregory Simons	Bermuda	21.88	
15	2	Angel Guerreros	Paraguay	22.03	
	1	Robert Martin	Canada	DQ	

=== Final ===
Wind: -2.4 m/s

Rank	Name	Nationality	Time	Notes
1st place, gold medalist(s)	James Gilkes	Guyana	20.43	
2nd place, silver medalist(s)	Larry Brown	United States	20.69	
3rd place, bronze medalist(s)	Mike Sands	Bahamas	20.98	
4	Bill Collins	United States	21.03	
5	Hugh Fraser	Canada	21.09	
6	Pablo Montes	Cuba	21.35	
7	Raymond Heerenveen	Netherlands Antilles	21.37	
8	Jesús Rohena	Puerto Rico	21.48	
