= Athletics at the 1975 Summer Universiade – Men's 200 metres =

The men's 200 metres event at the 1975 Summer Universiade was held at the Stadio Olimpico in Rome on 20 and 21 September.

Pietro Mennea's winning margin was an incredible 0.78 seconds which as of 2024 remains the greatest winning margin in the men's 200 metres at these championships and also the only time this event was won by more than 0.6 seconds at these championships since the introduction of fully automatic timing.

== Medalists ==
Gold	Silver	Bronze
Pietro Mennea; Italy	Robert Martin; Canada	Thorsten Johansson; Sweden

== Results ==
=== Heats ===
Held on 20 September

Wind:
Heat 5: -1.4 m/s, Heat 6: +1.0 m/s

Rank	Heat	Athlete	Nationality	Time	Notes
1	1	Pietro Mennea	Italy	21.01	Q
2	4	Thorsten Johansson	Sweden	21.34	Q
3	3	Robert Martin	Canada	21.39	Q
4	4	Claudiu Suselescu	Romania	21.45	Q
5	2	Toma Petrescu	Romania	21.48	Q
6	3	Luciano Caravani	Italy	21.49	Q
6	5	Sergey Vladimirtsev	Soviet Union	21.49	Q
8	6	Aleksandr Zhidkikh	Soviet Union	21.53	Q
9	5	Charles Ducasse	France	21.61	Q
10	2	Roland Bombardella	Luxembourg	21.67	Q
11	1	Uwe Schläfer	West Germany	21.70	Q
12	6	Albin Dukowski	Canada	21.77	Q
13	5	Roger Jenkins	Great Britain	21.79	q
14	4	Reno Roelandt	Belgium	21.82	q
15	2	Günther Würfel	Austria	21.84	q
15	4	Grzegorz Mądry	Poland	21.84	
15	6	Jan Alończyk	Poland	21.84	
18	4	Jorge Mathias	Brazil	21.89	
19	3	Franco Fähndrich	Switzerland	21.93	
20	5	Peter Matejka	Austria	22.03	
21	3	Juan Jesús Sarrasqueta	Spain	22.13	
22	6	Henri Hermans	Belgium	22.17	
23	1	Abdulaziz Al-Hadba	Kuwait	22.21	
24	1	Arturo Godoy	Mexico	22.26	
25	6	Gilles Dautremer	France	22.33	
26	3	Tibor Nagy	Hungary	22.43	
27	3	Babak Mahmoudian	Iran	22.56	
28	2	Houshemy Yar Arshadi	Iran	22.58	
29	1	Albert Toro	Central African Republic	22.61	
30	6	José Antônio Rabaca	Brazil	22.73	
31	2	Thimotée Ngbangandimbo	Central African Republic	22.85	
32	4	Philippe Étienne	Haiti	22.91	
33	2	Miguel López	Central African Republic	23.13	
34	5	Wilfrid Cyriaque	Haiti	23.51	
35	4	S. Sotaravat	Thailand	23.52	
36	2	Mohamed Kamal	Kuwait	23.76	
37	6	Carlos Mejía	Honduras	24.03	
38	3	Carlos Rosales	Honduras	24.68	

=== Semifinals ===
Held on 21 September

Wind:
Heat 1: 0.0 m/s, Heat 2: ? m/s

Rank	Heat	Athlete	Nationality	Time	Notes
1	2	Pietro Mennea	Italy	21.11	Q
2	2	Robert Martin	Canada	21.29	Q
3	1	Thorsten Johansson	Sweden	21.30	Q
4	1	Sergey Vladimirtsev	Soviet Union	21.42	Q
5	1	Charles Ducasse	France	21.48	Q
6	2	Claudiu Suselescu	Romania	21.49	Q
7	1	Luciano Caravani	Italy	21.55	Q
8	1	Toma Petrescu	Romania	21.58	
9	1	Reno Roelandt	Belgium	21.73	
9	2	Uwe Schläfer	West Germany	21.73	Q
11	1	Albin Dukowski	Canada	21.77	
12	2	Aleksandr Zhidkikh	Soviet Union	21.89	
13	1	Günther Würfel	Austria	21.99	
13	2	Roland Bombardella	Luxembourg	21.99	
15	2	Roger Jenkins	Great Britain	22.03	

=== Final ===
Held on 21 September

Wind: 0.0 m/s

Rank	Athlete	Nationality	Time	Notes
1st place, gold medalist(s)	Pietro Mennea	Italy	20.28	
2nd place, silver medalist(s)	Robert Martin	Canada	21.06	
3rd place, bronze medalist(s)	Thorsten Johansson	Sweden	21.15	
4	Claudiu Suselescu	Romania	21.21	
5	Sergey Vladimirtsev	Soviet Union	21.44	
6	Charles Ducasse	France	21.60	
7	Luciano Caravani	Italy	21.61	
8	Uwe Schläfer	West Germany	21.70	
