= Athletics at the 1979 Pan American Games – Men's 100 metres =

Men's 100 metres at the 1979 Pan American Games
- Venue: Estadio Sixto Escobar
- Dates: 7–8 July
- Winning time: 10.13

Medalists
Gold medal	Silvio Leonard	Cuba
Silver medal	Harvey Glance	United States
Bronze medal	Emmit King	United States

The men's 100 metres sprint competition of the athletics events at the 1979 Pan American Games took place on 7 and 8 July at the Estadio Sixto Escobar. The defending Pan American Games champion was Silvio Leonard of Cuba.

== Records ==
Prior to this competition, the existing world and Pan American Games records were as follows:

World record	Jim Hines (USA)	9.95	Mexico City, Mexico	October 14, 1968
Pan American Games record	Silvio Leonard (CUB)	10.15	Mexico City, Mexico	1975

== Results ==
All times shown are in seconds. Harvey Glance set a new Pan American Record in the semifinals with a time of 10.12 seconds.

KEY:	WR	World Record	GR	Pan American Record

=== Heats ===
Held on 7 July

Wind:
Heat 1: +0.7 m/s, Heat 2: +0.8 m/s, Heat 3: +1.1 m/s, Heat 4: +0.4 m/s

Rank	Heat	Name	Nationality	Time	Notes
1	3	Harvey Glance	United States	10.14	Q
2	2	Emmit King	United States	10.25	Q
3	1	Silvio Leonard	Cuba	10.27	Q
4	3	Rui da Silva	Brazil	10.38	Q
5	1	Nelson dos Santos	Brazil	10.39	Q
6	3	Ephraim Serrette	Trinidad and Tobago	10.42	Q
7	2	Desai Williams	Canada	10.44	Q
8	4	Osvaldo Lara	Cuba	10.45	Q
9	3	Jesús Cabrera	Puerto Rico	10.48	q
10	2	Guy Abrahams	Panama	10.50	Q
11	4	Rawle Clarke	Barbados	10.54	Q
12	4	Rudy Levarity	Bahamas	10.55	Q
13	4	Dennis Trott	Bermuda	10.56	q
14	2	Gerard Suero	Dominican Republic	10.59	q
15	1	Oliver Heywood	Jamaica	10.64	Q
15	4	Rafael Félix	Dominican Republic	10.64	q
17	1	Marvin Nash	Canada	10.73	
18	2	Richard Wilson	Jamaica	10.73	
19	1	Edwin Noel	Trinidad and Tobago	10.75	
20	4	Florencio Aguilar	Panama	10.76	
21	2	David Phillips	Barbados	10.91	
22	4	Luis Schneider	Chile	10.96	
23	3	Wendell Powell	Virgin Islands	10.98	
24	2	Roberto McFarlane	Costa Rica	11.11	
25	1	Ronald Russell	Virgin Islands	11.25	
	3	James Gilkes	Guyana	DNS	

=== Semifinals ===
Held on 7 July

Wind:
Heat 1: +0.9 m/s, Heat 2: +1.0 m/s

Rank	Heat	Name	Nationality	Time	Notes
1	1	Harvey Glance	United States	10.13	Q
2	2	Emmit King	United States	10.19	Q
3	1	Silvio Leonard	Cuba	10.21	Q
4	1	Nelson dos Santos	Brazil	10.30	Q
5	1	Desai Williams	Canada	10.43	Q
6	2	Rui da Silva	Brazil	10.44	Q
7	2	Rawle Clarke	Barbados	10.44	Q
8	2	Osvaldo Lara	Cuba	10.44	Q
9	1	Ephraim Serrette	Trinidad and Tobago	10.45	
10	2	Guy Abrahams	Panama	10.45	
11	2	Dennis Trott	Bermuda	10.56	
12	2	Jesús Cabrera	Puerto Rico	10.62	
13	1	Oliver Heywood	Jamaica	10.63	
14	2	Rafael Félix	Dominican Republic	10.68	
15	1	Rudy Levarity	Bahamas	10.69	
16	1	Gerard Suero	Dominican Republic	10.73	

=== Final ===
Held on 8 July

Wind: +1.5 m/s

Rank	Name	Nationality	Time	Notes
1st place, gold medalist(s)	Silvio Leonard	Cuba	10.13	
2nd place, silver medalist(s)	Harvey Glance	United States	10.19	
3rd place, bronze medalist(s)	Emmit King	United States	10.30	
4	Nelson dos Santos	Brazil	10.33	
5	Rui da Silva	Brazil	10.41	
6	Osvaldo Lara	Cuba	10.47	
7	Rawle Clarke	Barbados	10.48	
8	Desai Williams	Canada	10.58	
