= Leonard Jarvis (disambiguation) =

Leonard Jarvis may refer to:

- Leonard Jarvis (1781-1854), American businessman and politician
- Len Jarvis (1884-1951), English footballer

== See also ==
- Leonard Jervis (born 1949), Bahamian sprinter
