= Carlos Rosales =

Carlos Rosales may refer to:

- Carlos Rosales Gutiérrez (1909–1997), Chilean teacher and politician
- Carlos Rosales Mendoza (1963–2015), Mexican drug lord
- Carlos Rosales (athlete), competed in athletics at the 1975 Summer Universiade
