= Dukowski =

Dukowski is a surname. Notable people with the surname include:

- Albin Dukowski (born 1954), Canadian sprinter
- Chuck Dukowski (born 1954), American musician, stage name of Gary Arthur McDaniel
- L. S. Dukowski (1900–1976), Canadian ice hockey player
