= Donald Merrick =

Donald Merrick may refer to:

- Domino (artist) (1929–1990), pen name of American artist Donald Merrick
- Donald Merrick (athlete) (born 1955), American sprinter

== See also ==
- Donald Merricks (born 1952), American politician
