= Torsten Johansson =

Torsten Johansson may refer to:

- Torsten Johansson (footballer) (1906–1989), Swedish international footballer
- Torsten Johansson (tennis) (1920–2004), Swedish tennis player

== See also ==
- Thorsten Johansson (1950–2021), Swedish sprinter
