= Suchart Jairsuraparp =

Thai sprinter (born 1951)

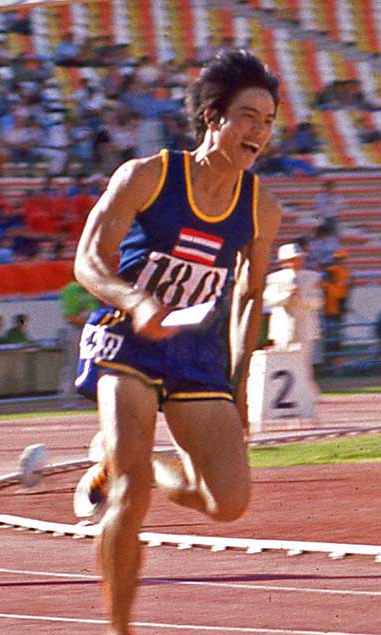
- Jairsuraparp at the 1974 Asian Games

Personal information
- Born: June 13, 1951 (age 75)
- Height: 170 cm (5 ft 7 in)
- Weight: 66 kg (146 lb)

Sport
- Sport: Athletics
- Event: 100 m

Achievements and titles
- Personal best: 10.44 (1978)
Medal record
Men's athletics
Representing Thailand
Asian Games
Gold medal – first place	1974 Tehran	4×100 m
Bronze medal – third place	1974 Tehran	100 m
Gold medal – first place	1978 Bangkok	4×100 m
Gold medal – first place	1978 Bangkok	100 m
Silver medal – second place	1982 New Delhi	4×100 m
Bronze medal – third place	1982 New Delhi	100 m
Asian Championships
Gold medal – first place	1979 Tokyo	100 m
Gold medal – first place	1981 Tokyo	100 m
Gold medal – first place	1983 Kuwait City	100 m
Silver medal – second place	1973 Marikina	100 m
Silver medal – second place	1973 Marikina	4×100 m
Silver medal – second place	1979 Tokyo	4×100 m
Silver medal – second place	1981 Tokyo	4×100 m
Silver medal – second place	1983 Kuwait City	4×100 m
SEA Games
Gold medal – first place	1977 Kuala Lumpur	100 m
Gold medal – first place	1977 Kuala Lumpur	4×100 m
Gold medal – first place	1979 Jakarta	100 m
Gold medal – first place	1981 Manila	100 m
Gold medal – first place	1981 Manila	4×100 m
Gold medal – first place	1983 Singapore	100 m
Gold medal – first place	1983 Singapore	4×100 m

Suchart Jairsuraparp (or Chairsuvaparb; Thai: สุชาติ แจสุรภาพ, RTGS: Suchat Chaesuraphap; born 13 June 1951) is a Thai former sprinter. He competed at the 1976 Summer Olympics in the 100 m and 4 × 100 m events, but failed to reach the finals. Jairsuraparp won the 100 m event at the Asian Championships in 1979, 1981 and 1983, placing second in 1973. At the Asian Games he won three gold, one silver and two bronze medals between 1974 and 1982.

== International competitions ==
Representing Thailand
Year	Competition	Venue	Position	Event	Result	Notes
1973	Asian Championships	Manila, Philippines	2nd	100 m	10.5	
1974	Asian Games	Tehran, Iran	3rd	100 m	10.59	
1974	Asian Games	Tehran, Iran	1st	4 × 100 m relay	40.14	
1975	Universiade	Rome, Italy	8th (h)	100 m	10.61	
1975	Universiade	Rome, Italy	10th (h)	4 × 100 m relay	42.17	
1976	Olympic Games	Montreal, Canada	38th (h)	100 m	10.75	
1976	Olympic Games	Montreal, Canada	15th (h)	4 × 100 m relay	40.68	
1977	World Cup	Düsseldorf, West Germany	6th	100 m	10.67^{1}	
1977	World Cup	Düsseldorf, West Germany	8th	4 × 100 m relay	41.09^{1}	
1978	Asian Games	Bangkok, Thailand	1st	100 m	10.44	
1978	Asian Games	Bangkok, Thailand	1st	4 × 100 m relay	40.32	
1979	Asian Championships	Tokyo, Japan	1st	100 m	10.63	
1979	World Cup	Montreal, Canada	7th	100 m	10.51^{1}	
1979	World Cup	Montreal, Canada	8th	4 × 100 m relay	40.09^{1}	
1981	Asian Championships	Tokyo, Japan	1st	100 m	10.52	
1981	World Cup	Rome, Italy	7th	100 m	10.73^{1}	
1982	Asian Games	New Delhi, India	3rd	100 m	10.76	
1982	Asian Games	New Delhi, India	2nd	4 × 100 m relay	39.92	
1983	World Championships	Helsinki, Finland	34th (h)	100 m	10.63	
1983	World Championships	Helsinki, Finland	17th (h)	4 × 100 m relay	40.17	
1983	Asian Championships	Kuwait City, Kuwait	1st	100 m	10.47	
1983	SEA Games	Singapore	1st	100 m	10.59	
1983	SEA Games	Singapore	1st	4×100 m relay	39.78	

^{1}Representing Asia
