= Guy Abrahams =

Panamanian athlete (born 1953)

Personal information
- Born: 7 March 1953 (age 73)
- Height: 1.73 m (5 ft 8 in)
- Weight: 65 kg (143 lb)
Medal record
Men's Athletics
Representing Panama
Central American and Caribbean Games
| Bronze medal – third place | 1978 Medellín | 100 m |
| Bronze medal – third place | 1978 Medellín | 200 m |
CAC Championships
| Gold medal – first place | 1979 Guadalajara | 100 m |

Guy Antonio Abrahams (born 7 March 1953) is a Panamanian athlete who competed mainly in the 100 metres. He represented his native country at the 1976 Summer Olympics finishing 5th in the 100 metres. Abrahams studied and competed for the University of Southern California. He won bronze medals in the 100 metres and 200 metres at the 1978 Central American and Caribbean Games.

He finished second behind James Sanford in the 100 metres event at the British 1978 AAA Championships.

== International competitions ==
| Year | Competition | Venue | Position | Event | Notes |
Representing Panama
| 1976 | Olympic Games | Montreal, Canada | 5th | 100 m | 10.25 |
| 1976 | Olympic Games | Montreal, Canada | 10th (sf) | 200 m | 21.15 |
| 1978 | Central American and Caribbean Games | Medellín, Colombia | 3rd | 100 m | 10.20 |
| 1978 | Central American and Caribbean Games | Medellín, Colombia | 3rd | 200 m | 21.15 |
| 1979 | Central American and Caribbean Championships | Guadalajara, Mexico | 1st | 100 m | 10.37 |
| 1979 | Pan American Games | San Juan, Puerto Rico | 10th (sf) | 100 m | 10.45 |
| 1979 | Pan American Games | San Juan, Puerto Rico | 19th (h) | 200 m | 22.50 |
