= Mark Fraser (ice hockey) =

Canadian ice hockey player (born 1986)

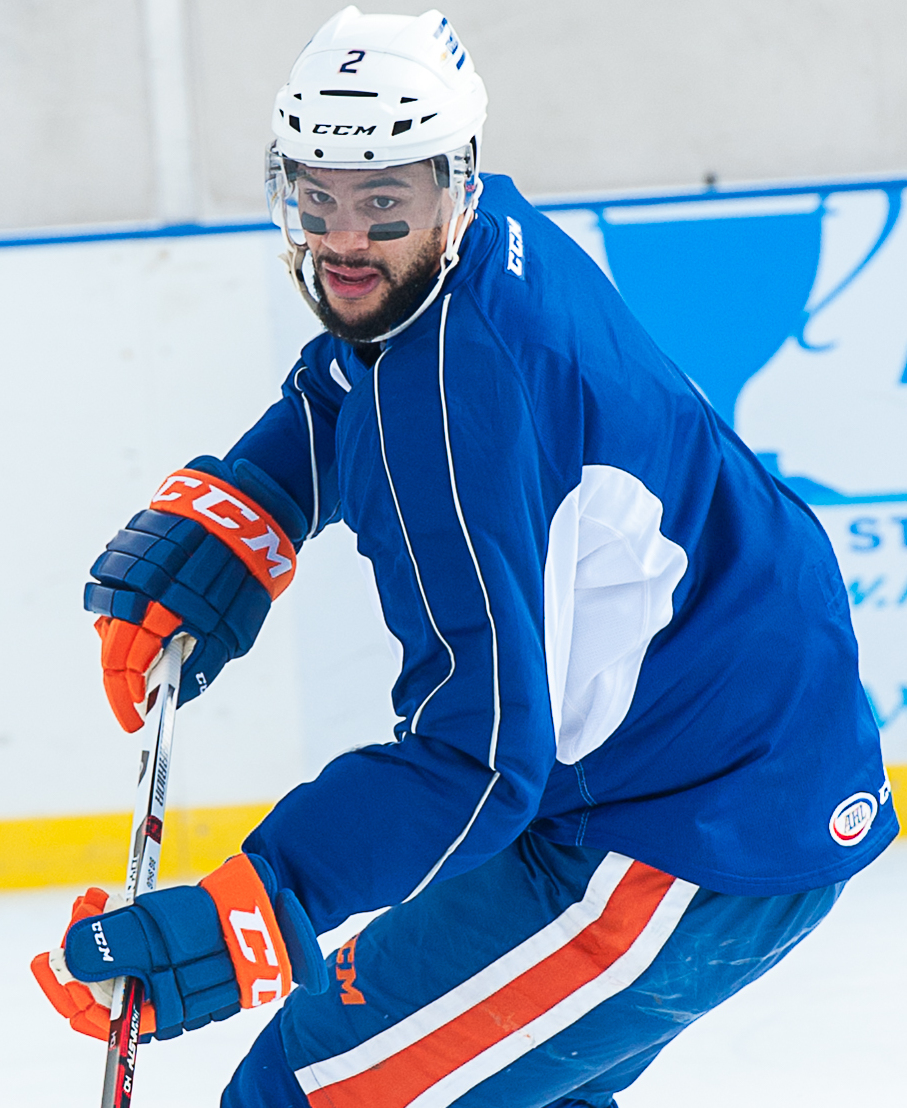
- Fraser with the Bakersfield Condors in 2017
- Born: September 29, 1986 (age 39) Ottawa, Ontario, Canada
- Height: 6 ft 4 in (193 cm)
- Weight: 235 lb (107 kg; 16 st 11 lb)
- Position: Defence
- Shot: Left
- Played for: New Jersey Devils; Toronto Maple Leafs; Edmonton Oilers; TPS; HKm Zvolen; Schwenninger Wild Wings
- NHL draft: 84th overall, 2005; New Jersey Devils
- Playing career: 2006–2020

Mark Alexander Fraser (born September 29, 1986) is a Canadian former professional ice hockey defenceman. He played for the New Jersey Devils, Toronto Maple Leafs and Edmonton Oilers in the National Hockey League (NHL).

== Playing career ==
Fraser played junior hockey with the Kitchener Rangers of the Ontario Hockey League from 2004–06. In his second season with the Rangers, his hard working style earned him the captaincy after Mike Richards left the team. He was selected by the New Jersey Devils in the third round, 84th overall, of the 2005 NHL entry draft. At the end of the 2005–06 season, he played his first professional games, joining the AHL Albany River Rats for four games. He played his first full professional season in 2006–07 with the Lowell Devils, and he played seven games for the New Jersey Devils as well. He remained with Lowell until 2009–10, when he made the New Jersey roster out of training camp.

He scored his first NHL goal on October 24, 2009, against Marc-André Fleury of the Pittsburgh Penguins.

On December 12, 2011, Fraser, along with Rod Pelley and a 2012 seventh round draft pick, was traded to the Anaheim Ducks in exchange for Kurtis Foster and Timo Pielmeier. On February 27, 2012, Fraser was traded from the Anaheim Ducks to the Toronto Maple Leafs for Dale Mitchell.

On July 30, 2013, Fraser and the Toronto Maple Leafs avoided salary arbitration and agreed to a one-year contract worth $1.275 million. In the following 2013–14 season, Fraser was unable to match his performance from the lockout season and on January 31, 2014, he was traded by the Leafs to the Edmonton Oilers in exchange for the rights to Teemu Hartikainen and Cam Abney.

A free agent into the 2014–15 season, Fraser made a return of sort to the New Jersey Devils organization in signing a one-year AHL contract with affiliate, the Albany Devils on November 2, 2014. He was later signed for the remainder of the season on an NHL contract with the Devils on December 18, 2014. Fraser's return was complete on January 3, 2015 when he played with New Jersey Devils against Philadelphia Flyers.

Fraser was not tendered an offer by the Devils and was released to free agency. Left without a contract by September, he would make a return to the Leafs, signing a professional try-out. He would ultimately be released without a deal.

On September 28, 2015, the Ottawa Senators signed Fraser to a one-year, two-way contract. After one year playing for the team's AHL affiliate, the Binghamton Senators, he left as a free agent and returned to the Edmonton Oilers on a one-year, two-way deal on July 1, 2016.

As an un-signed free agent leading into the 2017–18 season, Fraser opted to pursue a career abroad, agreeing to an initial try-out offer with Finnish outfit HC TPS of the Liiga on November 16, 2017.

After a second season abroad in the Slovak Extraliga with HKm Zvolen, Fraser signed a one-year contract for the 2019-20 season with German outfit, Schwenninger Wild Wings of the DEL on May 6, 2019.

== Personal ==
Fraser is the son of former sprinter and Ontario Court of Justice Judge, Hugh Fraser, and retired teacher Ann Kennedy.

After his playing career came to a close, Fraser was hired by the Toronto Maple Leafs and Maple Leaf Sports & Entertainment in February 2021 "for a role focused on player development with its Equity, Diversity and Inclusion team."

== Career statistics ==
			Regular season					Playoffs
Season	Team	League	GP	G	A	Pts	PIM	GP	G	A	Pts	PIM
2002–03	Gloucester Rangers U18 AAA	HEO	31	4	14	18	62	—	—	—	—	—
2002–03	Gloucester Rangers	CJHL	5	0	0	0	4	—	—	—	—	—
2003–04	Gloucester Rangers	CJHL	50	0	11	11	105	20	0	3	3	32
2004–05	Kitchener Rangers	OHL	58	0	8	8	96	15	0	3	3	26
2005–06	Kitchener Rangers	OHL	59	0	5	5	129	5	0	1	1	4
2005–06	Albany River Rats	AHL	4	0	0	0	2	—	—	—	—	—
2006–07	Lowell Devils	AHL	71	1	8	9	73	—	—	—	—	—
2006–07	New Jersey Devils	NHL	7	0	0	0	7	—	—	—	—	—
2007–08	Lowell Devils	AHL	79	1	17	18	96	—	—	—	—	—
2008–09	Lowell Devils	AHL	74	3	14	17	152	—	—	—	—	—
2009–10	New Jersey Devils	NHL	61	3	3	6	36	1	0	0	0	0
2010–11	New Jersey Devils	NHL	26	0	2	2	29	—	—	—	—	—
2010–11	Albany Devils	AHL	5	0	1	1	0	—	—	—	—	—
2011–12	New Jersey Devils	NHL	4	0	0	0	14	—	—	—	—	—
2011–12	Syracuse Crunch	AHL	25	0	5	5	35	—	—	—	—	—
2011–12	Toronto Marlies	AHL	20	0	2	2	32	17	0	3	3	31
2012–13	Toronto Marlies	AHL	30	2	3	5	114	—	—	—	—	—
2012–13	Toronto Maple Leafs	NHL	45	0	8	8	85	4	0	1	1	7
2013–14	Toronto Maple Leafs	NHL	19	0	1	1	33	—	—	—	—	—
2013–14	Edmonton Oilers	NHL	23	1	0	1	43	—	—	—	—	—
2014–15	Albany Devils	AHL	18	1	2	3	45	—	—	—	—	—
2014–15	New Jersey Devils	NHL	34	0	4	4	55	—	—	—	—	—
2015–16	Binghamton Senators	AHL	60	2	5	7	136	—	—	—	—	—
2016–17	Bakersfield Condors	AHL	65	3	3	6	79	—	—	—	—	—
2017–18	TPS	Liiga	32	0	5	5	64	11	0	0	0	8
2018–19	HKm Zvolen	Slovak	27	1	10	11	69	12	0	1	1	2
2019–20	Schwenninger Wild Wings	DEL	50	1	6	7	70	—	—	—	—	—
AHL totals			451	13	60	73	764	17	0	3	3	31
NHL totals			219	4	18	22	302	5	0	1	1	7
