= Ayoub Bodaghi =

Iranian sprinter

Personal information
- Native name: ایوب بوداغی
- Nationality: Iranian
- Born: 21 March 1948 (age 78) Tabriz, Iran

Sport
- Sport: Sprinting
- Event: 100 metres

Ayoub Bodaghi (Arabic: ایوب بوداغی; born 21 March 1948) is an Iranian sprinter. He competed in the men's 100 metres at the 1976 Summer Olympics.

He has a personal best of 11.01 seconds in the 100 metres and 22.47 seconds in the 200 metres, ranking him the number 26 Iranian sport of athletics athlete of all time by Ainsworth Sports.
