= Pearson Trotman =

Barbadian sprinter

Personal information
- Nationality: Barbadian
- Born: 29 November 1949 (age 76)

Sport
- Sport: Sprinting
- Event: 4 × 100 metres relay

Pearson Trotman (born 29 November 1949) is a Barbadian sprinter. He competed in the men's 4 × 100 metres relay at the 1976 Summer Olympics.
