= Christopher Brathwaite =

Trinidad and Tobago sprinter

Christopher Anthony Brathwaite (August 12, 1948 – November 12, 1984) was an athlete from Trinidad and Tobago who specialized in the 100 and 200 metres.

He was born in Maraval, Trinidad and attended Eastern New Mexico University, Spokane Community College and University of Oregon (UO). He graduated from the UO with a BA and MA in sociology. He was the Trinidad and Tobago 100/200 metres champion in 1978, and he won these titles again in 1983.

He competed in two Olympic Games, where he reached the semi-final of the 100 metres at the 1980 Moscow Olympics and the quarter-final of the 200 metres. He also competed at the inaugural World Championships in Helsinki.

Brathwaite was killed on November 12, 1984, when he was shot while running on Pre's Trail near Autzen Stadium in Eugene, Oregon. The perpetrator, who later committed suicide, was found to have used cocaine prior to the shooting. About 400 people attended the funeral.

At the time he was killed, Brathwaite was training for the 1988 Seoul Olympics.

== Legacy ==
In 2014, the Oregon Track Club established the Chris Brathwaite award. Brathwaite's son Sean became a police officer, serving the Eugene Police Department and the University of Oregon Police Department.

== International competitions ==
Year	Competition	Venue	Position	Event	Notes
Representing Trinidad and Tobago
1970	Central American and Caribbean Games	Panama City, Panama	10th (sf)	100 m	10.5
1970	Central American and Caribbean Games	Panama City, Panama	10th (sf)	200 m	21.7
1970	Central American and Caribbean Games	Panama City, Panama	5th	4 × 100 m relay	41.6
1970	Central American and Caribbean Games	Panama City, Panama	3rd (h)	4 × 400 m relay	3:17.0
1973	Central American and Caribbean Championships	Maracaibo, Venezuela	3rd	4 × 100 m relay	41.1
1975	Central American and Caribbean Championships	Ponce, Puerto Rico	2nd	4 × 100 m relay	40.7
1975	Pan American Games	Mexico City, Mexico	9th (sf)	200 m	21.21
1975	Pan American Games	Mexico City, Mexico	5th	4 × 100 m relay	39.25
1976	Olympic Games	Montreal, Canada	33rd (h)	100 m	10.71
1976	Olympic Games	Montreal, Canada	11th (sf)	4 × 100 m relay	39.88
1978	Commonwealth Games	Edmonton, Canada	7th	100 m	10.32 (w)
1978	Commonwealth Games	Edmonton, Canada	6th (sf)	200 m	21.10
1978	Commonwealth Games	Edmonton, Canada	2nd	4 × 100 m relay	39.29
1980	Olympic Games	Moscow, Soviet Union	12th (sf)	100 m	10.54
1980	Olympic Games	Moscow, Soviet Union	17th (qf)	200 m	21.02
1980	Olympic Games	Moscow, Soviet Union	10th (h)	4 × 100 m relay	39.74
1981	Central American and Caribbean Championships	Santo Domingo, Dominican Republic	2nd	4 × 100 m relay	39.95
1982	Central American and Caribbean Games	Havana, Cuba	4th	100 m	10.38
1982	Commonwealth Games	Brisbane, Australia	12th (sf)	100 m	10.43
1982	Commonwealth Games	Brisbane, Australia	10th (sf)	200 m	21.09
1983	World Championships	Helsinki, Finland	24th (qf)	100 m	10.57
1983	World Championships	Helsinki, Finland	20th (qf)	200 m	21.14
1983	Pan American Games	Caracas, Venezuela	8th (sf)	100 m	10.53
1983	Pan American Games	Caracas, Venezuela	11th (h)	200 m	21.31
1983	Pan American Games	Caracas, Venezuela	5th	4 × 100 m relay	39.40

== See also ==
- List of homicides in Oregon
