= Arsène Kra Konan =

Ivorian sprinter

Personal information
- Nationality: Ivorian

Sport
- Sport: Sprinting
- Event: 4 × 100 metres relay

Arsène Kra Konan is an Ivorian sprinter. He competed in the men's 4 × 100 metres relay at the 1976 Summer Olympics.
