= Francis Adams (athlete) =

Trinidad and Tobago sprinter (1953–1987)

Francis Adams (29 October 1953 – 11 November 1987) was a sprinter from Trinidad and Tobago who specialized in the 100 metres.

== Biography ==
He participated twice in the Olympic Games. In 1976 in Montreal, he reached the semi-final with the 4 x 100 metres relay team, together with Christopher Brathwaite, Anthony Husbands, and Charles Joseph. At the 1980 Summer Olympics in Moscow, Adams participated in the 100 metres where he went out in the opening round.

Adams died at age 34 from gunshot wounds in Port of Spain.
