= Jörg Pfeifer =

East German sprinter

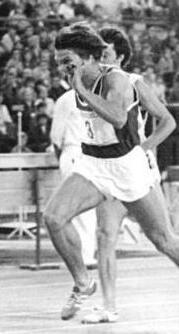
- Pfeifer in 1978

Personal information
- Born: 19 March 1952 (age 74)
Medal record
Men's athletics
Representing East Germany
Olympic Games
Silver medal – second place	1976 Montreal	4 × 100 m relay
European Championships
Bronze medal – third place	1971 Helsinki	200 m

Jörg Pfeifer (born 19 March 1952) is a retired East German athlete who competed mainly in the 100 metres.

He competed for East Germany in the 1976 Summer Olympics held in Montreal, Quebec, Canada in the 4 × 100 metre relay where he won the silver medal with his teammates Manfred Kokot, Klaus-Dieter Kurrat and Alexander Thieme.
