= 1984 Autzen Stadium shooting =

Mass shooting at the University of Oregon

Autzen Stadium shooting
- Location: Eugene, Oregon, U.S.
- Date: November 12, 1984; 8:30 A.M. – 9:00 A.M.
- Target: Autzen Stadium
- Attack type: Mass murder, shooting spree, mass shooting
- Weapons: Two .223-caliber semi-automatic rifles: Colt AR-15 SP1; Ruger Mini-14
- Deaths: 2 (including the perpetrator)
- Injuries: 1
- Perpetrator: Michael Evan Feher

On November 12, 1984, a shooting occurred at Autzen Stadium on the University of Oregon campus in Eugene, Oregon, United States. 19-year-old Michael Evan Feher, armed with two stolen rifles, opened fire upon athletes in and near the stadium, injuring one person and killing Christopher Brathwaite, a University of Oregon athlete who was a sprinter for the Trinidad and Tobago Olympic teams in 1976 and 1980.
