= Hasely Crawford =

Trinidadian sprinter

Medal record

Men's athletics

Representing Trinidad and Tobago

Olympic Games
Gold medal – first place	1976 Montreal	100 m

Pan American Games
Silver medal – second place	1975 Mexico City	100 m

Commonwealth Games
Silver medal – second place	1978 Edmonton	4 × 100 m
Bronze medal – third place	1970 Edinburgh	100 m
Bronze medal – third place	1978 Edmonton	100 m

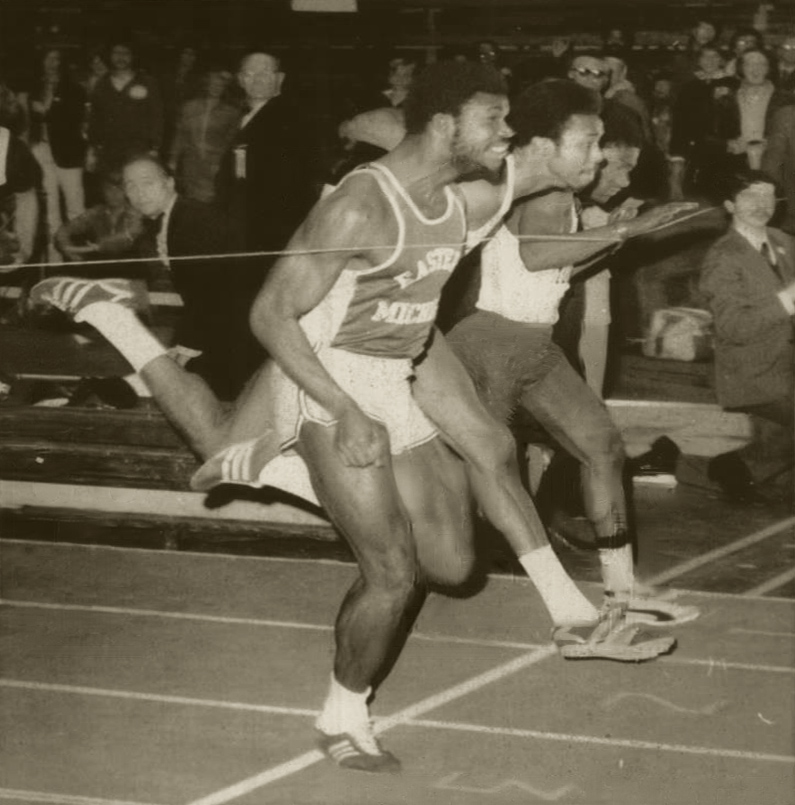
Hasely Crawford finishing first in the 60-yard dash at the USA Indoor Track and Field Championships in 1975

Hasely Joachim Crawford TC, OLY (born 16 August 1950) is a former track and field athlete from Trinidad and Tobago. In 1976, he became his country's first Olympic champion. Hasely Crawford Stadium, in Port of Spain, was renamed in his honour in 2001.

== Early years ==
Crawford was born in San Fernando, Trinidad and Tobago, one of the eleven children of Lionel Crawford and Phyllis Holder, and began pursuing athletics at the age of 17. He is a six-time Trinidad and Tobago 100 metres champion, and won the 200 metre title in 1976. He debuted internationally in 1970, winning a bronze medal in the 100 metres at the Commonwealth Games. Only two years later, he surprisingly qualified for the 100 metres final of the Olympics in Munich, but pulled his hamstring after 20 metres and failed to finish.

== Athletic career ==
Crawford ran for Eastern Michigan University under coach Bob Parks during his college years. He was the runner up at the 1975 Pan American Games in the 100 metres. His coach prepared him for the 100 metres and 200 metres events at the 1976 Summer Olympics with a strategy of only allowing him to run in a few races during the season. This tactic paid off, as Crawford, in the inside lane 1, narrowly won the 100 metres final in a time of 10.06 seconds, just 0.02 seconds in front of Don Quarrie of Jamaica, winning Trinidad and Tobago's first Olympic gold medal. He had also qualified for the 200 metres final, but was forced to pull out mid-race after injuring his pelvis.

After these Games, Crawford met with further success, winning the 100 metres event at the Central American and Caribbean Championships in 1977. On returning home, Hasely Crawford had both a jet and a stadium named after him. During his reign as the 100 metre Olympic champion, he also appeared on postage stamps and was awarded Trinidad and Tobago's highest honour, Trinity Cross, in 1978. This award was changed to the Order of the Republic of Trinidad and Tobago. Crawford went on to compete in a total of four Olympic Games as he also represented T&T at both the Moscow and Los Angeles editions in 1980 and 1984, but was unable to qualify for another final. Crawford's last international medals were a bronze and a silver which he won at the 1978 Commonwealth Games in the 100 metres and the 4 × 100 metres relay respectively. In 2000, he was named the Trinidad & Tobago Athlete of the Millennium. He is a member of the Caribbean Hall of Fame, along with Ato Boldon and Arthur Wint, one of only three track and field athletes to be inducted.

=== Personal best marks ===
- 50 m: 5.78 (indoor, February 1979, Ottawa)
- 100 m: 10.06 s (July 1976, Montreal)
- 200 m: 20.93 s (June 1977, London)

== International competitions ==
Year	Competition	Venue	Position	Event	Notes
Representing Trinidad and Tobago
1970	Central American and Caribbean Games	Panama City, Panama	5th	100 m	10.6
1970	Central American and Caribbean Games	Panama City, Panama	5th	4 × 100 m relay	41.6
1970	Commonwealth Games	Edinburgh, United Kingdom	3rd	100 m	10.33
1970	Commonwealth Games	Edinburgh, United Kingdom	6th	4 × 100 m relay	40.3
1972	Olympic Games	Munich, West Germany	5th (sf)	100 m	10.36^{1}
1975	Pan American Games	Mexico City, Mexico	2nd	100 m	10.21
1975	Pan American Games	Mexico City, Mexico	15th (h)	200 m	21.65
1975	Pan American Games	Mexico City, Mexico	5th	4 × 100 m relay	39.25
1976	Olympic Games	Montreal, Canada	1st	100 m	10.06
1976	Olympic Games	Montreal, Canada	8th	200 m	79.60
1977	Central American and Caribbean Championships	Xalapa, Mexico	1st	100 m	10.38
1977	Central American and Caribbean Championships	Xalapa, Mexico	2nd	4 × 100 m relay	40.16
1978	Central American and Caribbean Games	Medellín, Colombia	1st	4 × 100 m relay	39.13
1978	Commonwealth Games	Edmonton, Canada	3rd	100 m	10.09
1978	Commonwealth Games	Edmonton, Canada	2nd	4 × 100 m relay	39.29
1979	Pan American Games	San Juan, Puerto Rico	7th	4 × 100 m relay	40.44
1980	Olympic Games	Moscow, Soviet Union	8th (qf)	100 m	10.28
1980	Olympic Games	Moscow, Soviet Union	10th (h)	4 × 100 m relay	39.74
1982	Commonwealth Games	Brisbane, Australia	11th (sf)	100 m	10.40
1983	Pan American Games	Caracas, Venezuela	5th	4 × 100 m relay	39.40
1984	Olympic Games	Los Angeles, United States	18th (qf)	100 m	10.56

^{1}Did not finish in the final

Olympic Games
Preceded by Roger Gibbon	Flagbearer for Trinidad and Tobago; Munich 1972, Montreal 1976, Moscow 1980, Los Angeles 1984	Succeeded by Ian Morris
