= Hugh Spooner =

Canadian sprinter

Personal information
- Born: 25 November 1957 (age 68) Toronto, Ontario, Canada

Sport
- Sport: Sprinting
- Event: 4 × 100 metres relay

Hugh Spooner (born 25 November 1957) is a Canadian sprinter. He competed in the men's 4 × 100 metres relay at the 1976 Summer Olympics.

Spooner competed for the Texas Longhorns track and field team in the NCAA.
