= Clive Sands =

Bahamian sprinter

Personal information
- Nationality: Bahamian
- Born: 13 October 1952 (age 73)
- Height: 1.85

Sport
- Sport: Sprinting
- Event: 100 metres

Clive Sands (born 13 October 1952) is a Bahamian sprinter. He competed at the 1976 Summer Olympics.

Sands competed in three Olympic events; the 100 metres, 200 metres and 4 × 100 metres relay. He failed to progress past the heat in either event, also failing to finish the 200 metre dash.

Sands ran for the Iowa State Cyclones track and field team, and in 1974 he broke a 44-year-old school record in the 100 yard dash with a 9.3 second clocking. Before his time at Iowa, Sands competed at Worthington Community College (now merged into Minnesota West Community and Technical College) and was recruited for having run 9.5 seconds in the 100 yards there. His personal best time in the 100 metres was 10.3 seconds, achieved in 1976.
