= Mohamed Al-Sehly =

Saudi Arabian sprinter

Personal information
- Nationality: Saudi Arabian
- Born: 4 May 1955 (age 71)

Sport
- Sport: Sprinting
- Event: 100 metres

Mohamed Al-Sehly (born 4 May 1955) is a Saudi Arabian sprinter. He competed in the men's 100 metres at the 1976 Summer Olympics.
