= Adama Fall =

Senegalese sprinter

Personal information
- Nationality: Senegalese
- Born: 25 December 1950 (age 75)

Sport
- Sport: Sprinting
- Event: 100 metres

Adama Fall (born 25 December 1950) is a Senegalese sprinter. He competed in the men's 100 metres at the 1976 Summer Olympics.
