= Donald Merrick (athlete) =

American former sprinter (born 1955)

Medal record

Men's athletics

Representing the United States

Pan American Games
Gold medal – first place	1975 Mexico City	4 x 100 m relay

Donald Merrick (born November 26, 1955) is an American former sprinter. He won the gold medal in the 4 × 100 metres relay at the 1975 Pan American Games.
