= Alexander Thieme =

Personal information
- Born: 13 January 1954 Karl-Marx-Stadt, Saxony, East Germany
- Died: 29 November 2016 (aged 62)
Medal record
Men's athletics
Representing East Germany
Olympic Games
Silver medal – second place	1976 Montreal	4×100 m
European Championships
Silver medal – second place	1978 Prague	4×100 m
IAAF World Cup
Silver medal – second place	1977 Düsseldorf	4×100 m

Alexander Thieme (13 January 1954 – 29 November 2016) was an East German athlete, who competed mainly in the 100 metres. Thieme was born in Karl-Marx-Stadt, Saxony. He competed for East Germany in the 1976 Summer Olympics held in Montreal, Quebec, Canada in the 4 × 100 metres relay where he won the silver medal alongside his teammates Manfred Kokot, Jörg Pfeifer and Klaus-Dieter Kurrat. In 1977, his team came in second place in the 4 × 100 m relay at the IAAF World Cup in Düsseldorf.
