= Clementina Díaz y de Ovando =

Mexican writer, researcher, and academic

Clementina Díaz y de Ovando (November 7, 1916 in Laredo, Texas – February 18, 2012 in Mexico City) was a Mexican writer, researcher, and academic specialised in New Spain's art and architecture.

She studied Philosophy and Literature at the National Autonomous University of Mexico (Bachelor's degree, 1939, Master's, 1959, Doctorate, 1965).

== Awards and scholarships ==
- Investigadora Emérita, UNAM, 1983.
- Premio Universidad Nacional, 1988.
- Miembro de la Junta de Gobierno de la UNAM,1976–1986
- Consejera de la Comisión Nacional de Derechos Humanos, 1993.
- Cronista de la Universidad Nacional Autónoma de México, 1994.
- Presea Miguel Othón de Mendizábal, Instituto Nacional de Antropología e Historia, 1994.

== Works ==
- El Colegio Mexicano de San Pedro y San Pablo (1951)
- Obras completas de Juan Díaz Covarrubias (1959)
- La Escuela Nacional Preparatoria. Los afanes y los días (1972)
- Vicente Riva Palacio. Antología (1976)
- La Ciudad Universitaria. Reseña histórica 1929–1955 (1979)
- Odontología y publicidad en la prensa mexicana del siglo XIX (1982)
- Crónica de una quimera. Una inversión norteamericana en 1879 (1989)
- La postura de México frente al patrimonio arqueológico nacional (1990)

== Bibliography ==
- UNIVERSIDAD NACIONAL AUTÓNOMA DE MEXICO (1992) Nuestros maestros "Clementina Díaz y de Ovando" p. 121–124, México, ed.Dirección General de Asuntos del Personal Académico, UNAM. ISBN 968-36-2297-6 texto en la web Retrieved 2 December 2009.
