= Klaus-Dieter Kurrat =

East German sprinter (born 1955)

Olympic medal record

Men's athletics
Silver medal – second place	1976 Montreal	4 × 100 metre relay

Klaus-Dieter Kurrat (born 16 January 1955 in Nauen, Brandenburg) is a former East German athlete who competed mainly in the 100 metres.

He was a European Junior 100/200 metre champion in 1973. He was twice East German 100 Metres Champion, as well as 200 metre champion in 1976. He also added three 60 metre Indoor East German titles, as well as an indoor 100 metres.

He represented his native country at the 1976 Summer Olympics held in Montreal, Quebec, Canada in the 4 × 100 metre relay, where he won the silver medal with his teammates Manfred Kokot, Jörg Pfeifer and Alexander Thieme. He competed at the Moscow Olympic Games in the 100 metres, where he reached the quarterfinal.

He is married to Olympic gymnast Kerstin Gerschau.
