= Reinhard Borchert =

German sprinter

Personal information
- Nationality: German
- Born: 24 March 1948 (age 78) Lower Saxony, West Germany

Sport
- Sport: Sprinting
- Event: 4 × 100 metres relay
Medal record
Representing West Germany
Summer Universiade
Bronze medal – third place	1975 Rome	4x100m relay

Reinhard Borchert (born 24 March 1948) is a German sprinter. He competed in the men's 4 × 100 metres relay at the 1976 Summer Olympics representing West Germany.
