= Paul Narracott =

Australian sprinter and bobsledder (born 1959)

Personal information
- Nationality: Australian
- Born: 8 October 1959 (age 67) Florey, ACT, Australia
- Height: 182 cm (6 ft 0 in)
- Weight: 72 kg (159 lb)

Sport
- Sport: Athletics
- Event: Sprint

Paul Narracott (born 8 October 1959) is a retired Australian athlete who was the first sportsperson (and only male) to have represented Australia at both a Summer (Los Angeles, 1984) and Winter Olympics (Albertville, 1992).

Starting his career as a track sprinter, Paul was Australian Junior 100/200 metres champion. In 1977 he won his first of six Australian senior 100 metres championships, and was also 2nd in the 200 metres championships on four occasions.

== Career ==
In 1977 he won gold at the 100 metres at the Pacific Conference Games, he also won silver in the 200, and took two bronzes in the 4x100, and 4x400 at these Championships. He also competed at the World Cup in the 100 metres for Oceania where he finished 8th.

In 1978, Narracott ran 10.0 flat winning the Australian Championships, he then competed in the Commonwealth Games in Edmonton where he reached all three finals finishing 6th in the 100 metres, 4th in the 200 metres, and 7th with the sprint relay team.

He chose to not compete at the 1980 Moscow Olympics due to a partial boycott encouraged by the government.

In 1981, he competed at the Universiade, where he reached the semi-finals of both sprints.

In 1982, he competed in the Commonwealth Games in Brisbane, where again he reached the finals of 100, 200, and 4x100, where he finished 4th in all three events, narrowly missing out on a medal, especially in the 100 metres.

He competed in the World Championship in Helsinki in 1983, where he reached the 100 metres final finishing in 7th. He also ran in the 200 metres but went out in the Quarter finals.

In 1984 he ran a national hand time record of 9.9 in Brisbane, afterwards he had a victory over Mel Lattany at Melbourne, running a then Australian record of 10.26.

He went on to the 1984 Summer Olympics in Los Angeles to compete in the 100/200 but did not advance past the Quarter finals.

His personal best in the 100 metres was 10.26 in 1984, and for the 200 metres 20.65 in the 1982 Brisbane Commonwealth Games.

Also in 1984 he defeated Carl Lewis in the 60 metres in Osaka, Japan.

He also competed for the Australian two-man Bobsleigh team alongside Glen Turner at the 1992 Winter Olympics in Albertville, France, making him the first Australian Olympian to compete at both Summer and Winter Games. In 2014 Jana Pittman became the second Australian to achieve this feat, also competing as a track and field athlete and in the bobsled events in Sochi.

== Personal life ==
Narracott's niece is skeleton racer Jaclyn Narracott, who competed for Australia at the 2018 Pyeongchang Winter Olympics and won the silver medal at the 2022 Winter Olympics in Beijing.
