= Ernest Obeng =

Ghanaian sprinter (born 1956)

Personal information
- Nationality: Ghanaian
- Born: 8 April 1956 (age 70)
- Height: 168 cm (5 ft 6 in)
- Weight: 72 kg (159 lb)

Sport
- Sport: Athletics
- Event: Sprints
- Club: Belgrave Harriers
Medal record
Men's athletics
Representing Ghana
African Championships
Gold medal – first place	1979 Dakar	100 m
Gold medal – first place	1982 Cairo	100 m
Summer Universiade
Bronze medal – third place	1981 Bucharest	100 m

Ernest George Ahwireng Obeng (born 8 April 1956) is a Ghanaian retired sprinter who specialised in the 100 metres and was selected for the 1984 Summer Olympics.

== Biography ==
Obeng won the gold medal at the 1979 African Championships. His personal best time was 10.21 seconds, achieved in August 1980 in Budapest, and because his country Ghana boycotted the Olympic Games that year he missed the opportunity to make the 1980 Olympic Games.

Obeng won a bronze medal at the 1981 Universiade, represented Africa in the 100 metres at the 1981 IAAF World Cup, finishing second behind Scottish sprinter Allan Wells, won the gold medal at the 1982 African Championships and competed at the 1983 World Championships.

He was selcetd by Ghana for the 100 metres at the 1984 Olympic Games in Los Angeles but failed to start. However he did win the 100 metres title at the British 1985 AAA Championships.

He represented Ghana up to 1986 and Great Britain from then until the end of his career.

He is now in charge of television operations for the International Association of Athletics Federations, working from their offices in Monaco.

== International competitions ==
Representing Ghana
Year	Competition	Venue	Position	Event	Result	Notes
1979	African Championships	Dakar, Senegal	1st	100 m	10.54	
1981	IAAF World Cup	Rome, Italy	2nd	100 m	10.21	
1982	African Championships	Cairo, Egypt	1st	100 m	10.20	
