= Barka Sy =

Senegalese sprinter

Personal information
- Nationality: Senegalese
- Born: 22 July 1943 (age 82)

Sport
- Sport: Sprinting
- Event: 100 metres

Barka N. Sy (born 22 July 1943) is a Senegalese sprinter. He competed in the 100 metres at the 1968, 1972 and the 1976 Summer Olympics. He won a silver medal in the 100 metres at the 1973 All-Africa Games.
