= Bryan Saunders =

Canadian sprinter (1952–2022)

Personal information
- Nationality: Canadian
- Born: 9 July 1952 Port of Spain, Trinidad and Tobago
- Died: April 2022 (aged 69) Markham, Ontario, Canada
- Height: 183 cm (6 ft 0 in)
- Weight: 68 kg (150 lb)

Sport
- Sport: Athletics
- Event: Sprinting/400 metres
Medal record
Men's athletics
Representing Canada
Pan American Games
Bronze medal – third place	1975 Mexico City	4 x 400 m relay
Universiade
Bronze medal – third place	1975 Rome	400 metres
Representing Americas
IAAF World Cup
Bronze medal – third place	1977 Düsseldorf	4 x 400 m relay

Bryan Saunders (9 July 1952 – April 2022) was a Canadian sprinter. He competed in the 400 metres at the 1976 Summer Olympics and the 1984 Summer Olympics.

Saunders competed for the Long Beach State Beach track and field team in the NCAA.

Saunders won a bronze medal in the 400 metres at the 1975 Summer Universiade and in the 4 x 400 metres relay at the 1975 Pan American Games. He finished second behind David Jenkins in the 400 metres event at the British 1976 AAA Championships.

Saunders represented Canada in the 4 x 400 metres relay at the 1983 World Championships in Athletics.
