= Rudy Reid =

Trinidad and Tobago sprinter (born 1952)

Personal information
- Nationality: Trinidad and Tobago
- Born: 13 November 1952 (age 73)

Sport
- Sport: Sprinting
- Event: 100 metres

Rudolph T. Reid (born 13 November 1952) is a Trinidad and Tobago sprinter. He competed in the men's 100 metres at the 1972 Summer Olympics.

Reid was an All-American sprinter for the UTEP Miners track and field team, placing 4th in the 4 × 100 metres relay at the 1973 NCAA University Division Outdoor Track and Field Championships.
