= Dieter Steinmann =

German sprinter

Personal information
- Nationality: German
- Born: 2 April 1950 (age 76) Bochum, West Germany

Sport
- Sport: Sprinting
- Event: 100 metres
Medal record
Representing West Germany
Summer Universiade
Bronze medal – third place	1975 Rome	4x100m relay

Dieter Jürgen Steinmann (born 2 April 1950) is a German sprinter. He competed in the men's 100 metres at the 1976 Summer Olympics representing West Germany.
