= Fletcher Lewis =

Bahamian long jumper

Personal information
- National team: Bahamian
- Born: 16 July 1955 (age 70)

Sport
- Event: Long jumping

Fletcher Lewis (born 16 July 1955) is a Bahamian former long jumper who competed in the 1976 Summer Olympics. Lewis achieved a personal best of 7.97 meters which be accomplished in 1976 during a competition in Gainesville, FL.
