= Athletics at the 1975 Pan American Games =

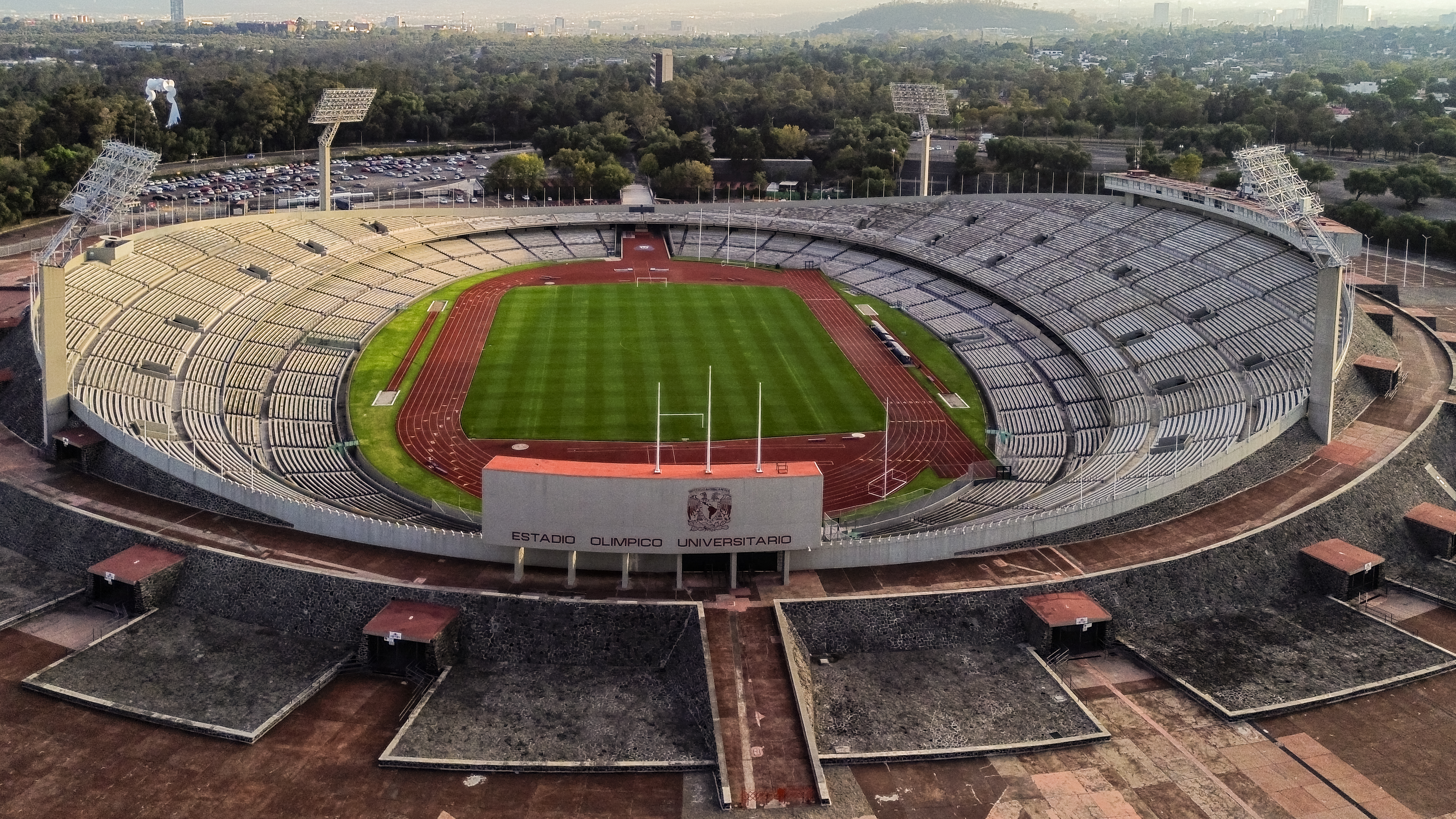
- Dates: 13–20 October
- Host city: Mexico City, Mexico
- Venue: Estadio Olímpico Universitario
- Level: Senior
- Events: 37
- Participation: 377 athletes from 29 nations

The athletics competition at the 1975 Pan American Games was held in Mexico City, Mexico between 13 and 20 October.

== Medal summary ==
=== Men's events ===
Event	Gold		Silver		Bronze	
100 metres (wind: -0.4 m/s)	Silvio Leonard; Cuba	10.15A =GR	Hasely Crawford; Trinidad and Tobago	10.21A	Hermes Ramírez; Cuba	10.34A
200 metres (wind: -2.4 m/s)	James Gilkes; Guyana	20.43A	Larry Brown; United States	20.69A	Mike Sands; Bahamas	20.98A
400 metres	Ronnie Ray; United States	44.45A GR	Alberto Juantorena; Cuba	44.80A	Delmo da Silva; Brazil	45.53A
800 metres	Luis Medina; Cuba	1:47.98A	Leandro Civil; Cuba	1:48.75A	Carlos Martínez; Mexico	1:48.78A
1500 metres	Tony Waldrop; United States	3:45.09A	Carlos Martínez; Mexico	3:45.98A	Luis Medina; Cuba	3:49.84A
5000 metres	Domingo Tibaduiza; Colombia	14:02.00A	Theodore Castaneda; United States	14:03.20A	Rodolfo Gómez; Mexico	14:05.25A
10,000 metres	Luis Hernández; Mexico	29:19.28A	Rodolfo Gómez; Mexico	29:21.22A	Domingo Tibaduiza; Colombia	29:25.45A
Marathon	Rigoberto Mendoza; Cuba	2:25:03A	Charles "Chuck" Smead; United States	2:25:32A	Tom Howard; Canada	2:25:46A
110 metres hurdles (wind: 0.0 m/s)	Alejandro Casañas; Cuba	13.44A	Danny Smith; Bahamas	13.72A	Arnaldo Bristol; Puerto Rico	13.74A
400 metres hurdles	James King; United States	49.60A	Ralph Mann; United States	50.04A	Dámaso Alfonso; Cuba	50.19A
3000 metres steeplechase	Mike Manley; United States	9:04.29A	José Romão da Silva; Brazil	9:05.31A	Octavio Guadarrama; Mexico	9:15.00A
4 × 100 metres relay	United States; Clancy Edwards; Larry Brown; Donald Merrick; Bill Collins	38.31A GR	Cuba; Hermes Ramírez; Alejandro Casañas; Pablo Montes; José Triana	38.46A	Canada; Hugh Fraser; Marvin Nash; Albin Dukowski; Robert Martin	38.86A
4 × 400 metres relay	United States; Herman Frazier; Robert Taylor; Maurice Peoples; Ronnie Ray	3:00.76A	Cuba; Eddy Gutiérrez; Carlos Álvarez; Dámaso Alfonso; Alberto Juantorena	3:02.82A	Canada; Glenn Bogue; Randy Jackson; Brian Saunders; Don Domansky	3:03.92A
20 kilometres walk	Daniel Bautista; Mexico	1:33:06A	Domingo Colín; Mexico	1:33:59A	Larry Young; United States	1:37:54A
High jump	Tom Woods; United States	2.25A	John Beers; Canada	2.17A	Rick Cuttell; Canada	2.17A
Pole vault	Earl Bell; United States	5.40A GR	Bruce Simpson; Canada	5.20A	Roberto Moré; Cuba	5.20A
Long jump	João Carlos de Oliveira; Brazil	8.19A	Arnie Robinson; United States	7.94A	Al Lanier; United States	7.91A
Triple jump	João Carlos de Oliveira; Brazil	17.89A WR	Tommy Haynes; United States	17.20A	Milan Tiff; United States	16.98A
Shot put	Bruce Pirnie; Canada	19.28A	Bishop Dolegiewicz; Canada	19.18A	Terry Albritton; United States	19.18A
Discus throw	John Powell; United States	62.36A	Julián Morrinson; Cuba	59.88A	Jay Silvester; United States	59.82A
Hammer throw	Larry Hart; United States	66.56A GR	Ángel Cabrera; Cuba	65.24A	Scott Neilson; Canada	64.56A
Javelin throw	Sam Colson; United States	83.82A	Juan Jarvis; Cuba	82.30A	Raúl Fernández; Cuba	72.90A
Decathlon	Bruce Jenner (Note: Jenner is now known as Caitlyn due to gender transition in 2015.); United States	8045A GR	Fred Dixon; United States	8019A	Jesús Mirabal; Cuba	7582A

=== Women's events ===
Event	Gold		Silver		Bronze	
100 metres (wind: -1.6 m/s)	Pamela Jiles; United States	11.38A	Patty Loverock; Canada	11.41A	Marjorie Bailey; Canada	11.42A
200 metres (wind: 0.0 m/s)	Chandra Cheeseborough; United States	22.77A	Pamela Jiles; United States	22.81A	Silvina Pereira; Brazil	23.17A
400 metres	Joyce Yakubowich; Canada	51.62A GR	Debra Sapenter; United States	52.22A	Lorna Forde; Barbados	52.36A
800 metres	Kathy Weston; United States	2:04.93A	Abby Hoffman; Canada	2:06.93A	Kathie Hall; United States	2:06.93A
1500 metres	Jan Merrill; United States	4:18.32A GR	Thelma Wright; Canada	4:22.32A	Abby Hoffman; Canada	4:26.25A
100 metres hurdles (wind: -0.3 m/s)	Edith Noeding; Peru	13.56A; NR	Deby LaPlante; United States	13.68A	Marlene Elejalde; Cuba	13.80A
4 × 100 metres relay	United States; Martha Watson; Brenda Morehead; Chandra Cheeseborough; Pamela Jiles	42.90A GR	Cuba; Marlene Elejarde; Silvia Chivás; Carmen Valdés; Fulgencia Romay	43.65A	Canada; Marjorie Bailey; Patty Loverock; Joanne McTaggart; Joyce Yakubowich	43.68A
4 × 400 metres relay	Canada; Margaret McGowen; Joanne McTaggart; Rachelle Campbell; Joyce Yakubowich	3:30.36A GR	United States; Sharon Dabney; Pat Helms; Debra Sapenter; Kathy Weston	3:30.64A	Cuba; Eia Cabreja; Rosa López; Asunción Acosta; Aurelia Pentón	3:31.65A
High jump	Joni Huntley; United States	1.89A	Louise Walker; Canada	1.86A	Andrea Bruce; Jamaica	1.83A
Long jump	Ana Alexander; Cuba	6.63A GR	Martha Watson; United States	6.57A	Kathy McMillan; United States	6.49A
Shot put	María Elena Sarría; Cuba	18.03A =GR	Hilda Ramírez; Cuba	17.28A	Lucette Moreau; Canada	16.98A
Discus throw	Carmen Romero; Cuba	60.16A	María Cristina Betancourt; Cuba	58.52A	Jane Haist; Canada	53.12A
Javelin throw	Sherry Calvert; United States	54.70A	María Beltrán; Cuba	54.36A	Lynn Cannon; United States	48.64A
Pentathlon	Diane Jones; Canada	4673A	Gale Fitzgerald; United States	4486A	Andrea Bruce; Jamaica	4391A

== Medal table ==
Rank	Nation	Gold	Silver	Bronze	Total
1	United States (USA)	19	13	8	40
2	Cuba (CUB)	7	11	8	26
3	Canada (CAN)	4	7	10	21
4	Mexico (MEX)	2	3	3	8
5	Brazil (BRA)	2	1	2	5
6	Colombia (COL)	1	0	1	2
7	Guyana (GUY)	1	0	0	1
7	Peru (PER)	1	0	0	1
9	Bahamas (BAH)	0	1	1	2
10	Trinidad and Tobago (TTO)	0	1	0	1
11	Jamaica (JAM)	0	0	2	2
12	Barbados (BAR)	0	0	1	1
12	Puerto Rico (PUR)	0	0	1	1
Totals (13 entries)		37	37	37	111

== Participating nations ==
- Argentina (18)
- Bahamas (7)
- Barbados (2)
- Bermuda (11)
- Bolivia (2)
- Brazil (22)
- Canada (51)
- Chile (4)
- Colombia (10)
- Costa Rica (3)
- Cuba (46)
- Dominican Republic (13)
- Ecuador (1)
- Guatemala (7)
- Guyana (6)
- Haiti (5)
- Honduras (4)
- Jamaica (20)
- Mexico (31)
- Netherlands Antilles (7)
- Nicaragua (3)
- Paraguay (2)
- Peru (2)
- Puerto Rico (13)
- Suriname (3)
- Trinidad and Tobago (11)
- United States (69)
- Virgin Islands (1)
- Uruguay (3)
