= Mike Sands (sprinter) =

Bahamian sprinter (born 1953)

Medal record

Men's athletics

Representing the Bahamas

Pan American Games
Bronze medal – third place	1975 Mexico City	200 m

CAC Championships
Gold medal – first place	1975 Ponce	400 m

Michael Sands (born 1 July 1953) is a Bahamian former track and field sprinter. During his peak he held the Bahamian records from 100 metres to 400 metres.

He represented his country twice at the Summer Olympics (1972 and 1976) and served as flag bearer on both occasions. He was the first ever gold medallist for the Bahamas at the 1975 Central American and Caribbean Championships in Athletics and also won a bronze medal at the 1975 Pan American Games.

He was president of the Bahamas Association of Athletic Associations, the national governing body for the sport of athletics. He is currently the president of North American, Central American and Caribbean Athletic Association (NACAC).

== Career ==
=== Sprinting ===
Sands attended Bahamas Academy in Nassau as a child and was later educated in the United States, studying at Sheepshead Bay High School in Brooklyn, New York before graduating from Penn State University. As a teenager he excelled in the sprints and a 19-year-old Sands was chosen for the 1972 Summer Olympics team. At the competition he was a quarter-finalists in the 100 metres and ran in the heats of the 200 metres and the 4×100 metres relay. Sands took over the mantle of the top Bahamian sprinter from Tom Robinson, who won multiple medals at the British Empire and Commonwealth Games in the 1960s.

While at university there, he competed in NCAA events with the Penn State Nittany Lions. He took All-American honours as a finalist in the 4×440-yard relay at the 1973 NCAA Outdoor Championships. In 1974 he was a 100-yard dash and 220-yard dash semi-finalist at the NCAA Outdoors. He won the 440-yard dash at the 1975 NCAA Indoor Championships with a time of 48.5 seconds. His fastest performance came at the 1975 NCAA Outdoor Championships: there he ran 45.46 seconds in the semi-finals (a new stadium record) but was over a second slower in the final, ending the competition in fifth place.

The 1975 season was his best athletically: he ran a personal best of 10.1 seconds for the 100 m and ran 45.20 seconds for the 440-yd dash. The latter time stood as the Bahamian national record for 21 years and Sands also held the national records from 100 m to 400 m at the time. He became the first person of his nation to win a gold medal at the Central American and Caribbean Championships in Athletics when he took the 400 m title at the 1975 event. He also claimed a bronze medal in the 200 m at the 1975 Pan American Games and placed fourth in the 400 m race.

Sands' second Olympic appearance followed at the 1976 Montreal Olympics and he again served as the nation's flag bearer. He was picked for the 100 m and 400 m disciplines and was a quarter-finalist over the longer distance. Sands retired from active competition in 1981.

=== Administration ===
Following his retirement from sprinting, Sands moved into the administrative sphere of the sport. He started this career path as public relations officer for the Bahamas Association of Athletic Associations (BAAA). He eventually rose in stature, taking on the position of vice-president of the Bahamas Olympic Committee and vice-president of the North American, Central American and Caribbean Athletic Association (2007 to 2011). He was elected president of the BAAA in 2009.

In November 2012 several new, younger, members were elected to the BAAA board, including Iram Lewis and Harrison Petty and Carl Oliver. Several of the new members were excluded from the 2013 CARIFTA Games and 2014 IAAF World Relays organising committees. A vote of no confidence in all the executive board was taken at a BAAA general meeting in response. Members of the board previously voted to remove Lewis, Petty and Oliver, but the three challenged the legality of the move. The BAAA board later voted to suspend Sands as president for 30 days in November 2013. He issued a video response disputing the validity of the motion – he revealed that two groups within the BAAA had formed and each attended only their own meetings – one organised by the president, the others organised by the general secretary Oliver.

== See also ==
- List of Pennsylvania State University Olympians
