= Lucien Sainte-Rose =

French sprinter

Personal information
- Born: 29 May 1953 (age 73) Fort-de-France, Martinique

Sport
- Sport: Track and field
Medal record
Representing France
European Championships
Gold medal – first place	1974 Rome	4×100 m
European Indoor Championships
Gold medal – first place	1973 Rotterdam	4×340 m

Lucien Sainte-Rose (born 29 May 1953) is a retired French athlete who specialised in the 100 and 200 meters. Sainte-Rose was born in Fort-de-France, Martinique, and competed at the 1972 Summer Olympics and 1976 Summer Olympics.
