= Thorsten Johansson =

Swedish sprinter (1950–2021)

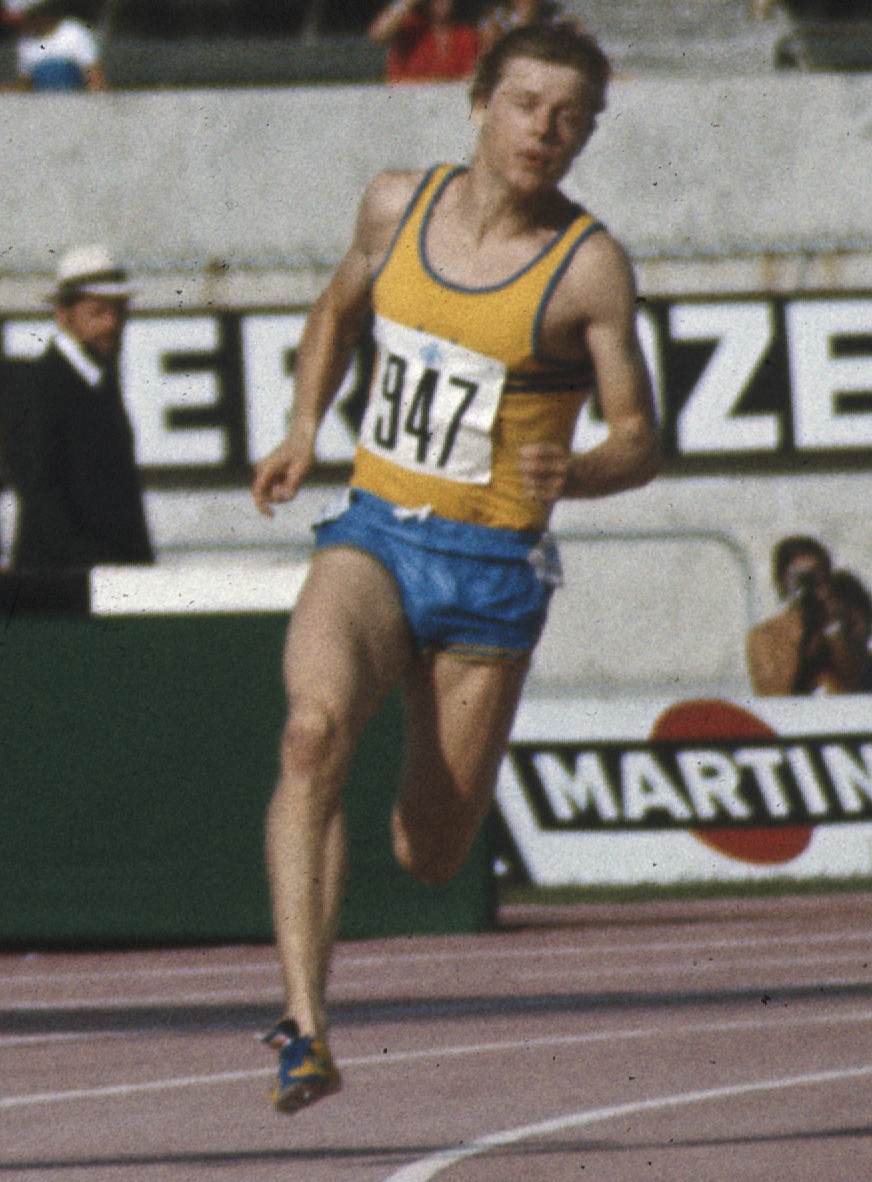

Personal information
- Nationality: Swedish
- Born: 9 October 1950 Nyköping, Sweden
- Died: 18 January 2021 (aged 70) Sölvesborg, Sweden

Sport
- Sport: Sprinting
- Event: 200 metres
Medal record
Representing Sweden
Summer Universiade
Bronze medal – third place	1975 Rome	200m

Thorsten Johansson (9 October 1950 – 18 January 2021) was a Swedish sprinter. He competed in the men's 200 metres at the 1976 Summer Olympics.
