= Andrzej Świerczyński =

Polish sprinter

Personal information
- Nationality: Polish
- Born: 25 October 1952 (age 73) Warsaw, Poland
- Height: 176 cm (5 ft 9 in)

Sport
- Sport: Sprinting
- Event: 100 metres

Andrzej Świerczyński (born 25 October 1952) is a Polish sprinter. He competed in the men's 100 metres at the 1976 Summer Olympics. He is married to Polish Olympic athlete Bożena Nowakowska.
