= Mike Sharpe (sprinter) =

Bermudian sprinter (1956–2021)

Personal information
- Nationality: Bermudian
- Born: 15 June 1956 Bermuda
- Died: 11 December 2021 (aged 65)

Sport
- Sport: Sprinting
- Event: 100 metres

Mike Sharpe (15 June 1956 – 11 December 2021) was a Bermudian sprinter. He competed in the men's 100 metres at the 1976 Summer Olympics. After retiring from sports, Sharpe became a news presenter for the Bermuda Broadcasting Company. He died in December 2021, at the age of 65.

Sharpe competed for the Florida Gators track and field team in the NCAA.
