= Leonard Jervis =

Bahamian sprinter

Personal information
- Nationality: Bahamian
- Born: 19 April 1949 (age 77)

Sport
- Sport: Sprinting
- Event: 100 metres

Leonard Jervis (born 19 April 1949) is a Bahamian sprinter. He competed in the men's 100 metres at the 1976 Summer Olympics.
