= Luciano Caravani =

Italian sprinter (born 1953)

Personal information
- Nationality: Italian
- Born: 14 May 1953 (age 73) Vicenza, Italy
- Height: 1.72 m (5 ft 7 1/2 in)
- Weight: 71 kg (157 lb)

Sport
- Country: Italy
- Sport: Athletics
- Event: Sprint
- Club: G.S. Fiamme Oro

Achievements and titles
- Personal best: 100 m: 10.23 (1979)
Medal record
Summer Universiade
Gold medal – first place	1979 Mexico City	4x100 metres relay
Silver medal – second place	1977 Sofia	4x100 metres relay
Mediterranean Games
Gold medal – first place	1979 Split	200 metres
Gold medal – first place	1979 Split	4x100 metres relay
Silver medal – second place	1975 Algers	4x100 metres relay
European Cup
Bronze medal – third place	1975 Nice	4x100 metres relay

Luciano Caravani (born 14 May 1953) is a retired Italian sprinter who specialized in the 100 and 200 metres. He was born in Vicenza, Veneto. He won six medals at the International athletics competitions, of these five with the national relay team.

== Biography ==
His personal best 100 metres time is 10.23 seconds, achieved in August 1984 in Zurich. His personal best 200 metres time is 20.59 seconds, achieved in July 1979 in Algiers. He has 34 caps in national team from 1975 to 1983.

== Achievements ==
Year	Tournament	Venue	Result	Event
1976	Olympic Games	Montreal, Canada	6th	4 × 100 m relay
1979	Mediterranean Games	Split, Yugoslavia	1st	200 m
1982	European Championships	Athens, Greece	4th	4 × 100 m relay

== National titles ==
In the "Pietro Mennea era", Luciano Caravani has won two times the individual national championship.

- 1 win in the 100 metres (1977)
- 1 win in the 60 metres indoor (1975)

== See also ==
- Italy national relay team
