= Charles Joseph (athlete) =

Trinidad and Tobago sprinter

Charles Joseph (born March 25, 1952, on Trinidad) is a retired athlete from Trinidad and Tobago who specialized in the 400 metres and 4 x 400 metres relay.

He attended the Seton Hall University, New Jersey, US.

== Achievements ==
Year	Tournament	Venue	Result	Extra
1972	Olympic Games	Munich, Germany	8th	4 × 400 m relay
1975	Pan American Games	Mexico City, Mexico	5th	4 × 400 m relay
1976	Olympic Games	Montreal, Canada	6th	4 × 400 m relay
1980	Olympic Games	Moscow, Soviet Union	6th	4 × 400 m relay
