= Danny Smith (athlete) =

Bahamian sprinter (1952–1983)

Personal information
- Nationality: Bahamian
- Born: John Daniel Smith; 15 May 1952
- Died: 14 February 1983 (aged 30)

Sport
- Sport: Sprinting
- Event: 110 m hurdles

John Daniel "Danny" Smith (15 May 1952 – 14 February 1983) was a Bahamian sprinter. He competed in the 4 × 100 metres relay at the 1972 Summer Olympics and the 1976 Summer Olympics. He won a silver medal in the 110 metres hurdles at the 1975 Pan American Games. Running for Florida State, he was the 1974-5 NCAA Indoor Champion for 60 yard hurdles.
