= Athletics at the 1975 Summer Universiade =

Athletics at the VIII Summer Universiade
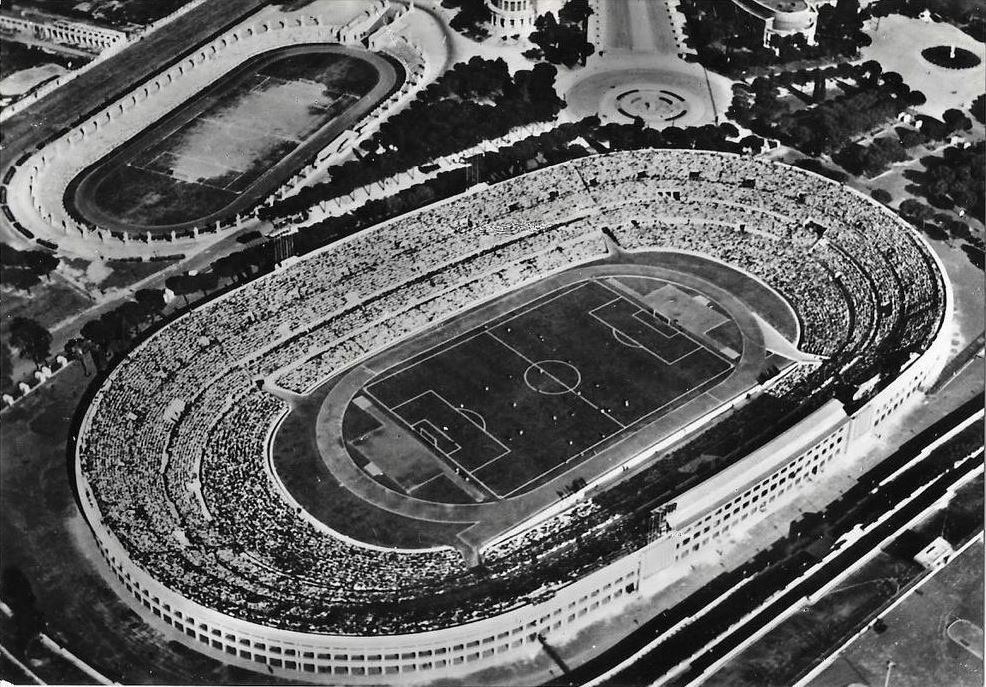
- The host stadium for the events
- Dates: 18–21 September 1975
- Host city: Rome, Italy
- Venue: Stadio Olimpico
- Level: University
- Events: 35

With all other disciplines having been cancelled, the 1975 Summer Universiade only featured athletics events and was referred to as the World University Championships in athletics. The competition was held in Rome between 18 and 21 September.

== Medal summary ==
=== Men's events ===
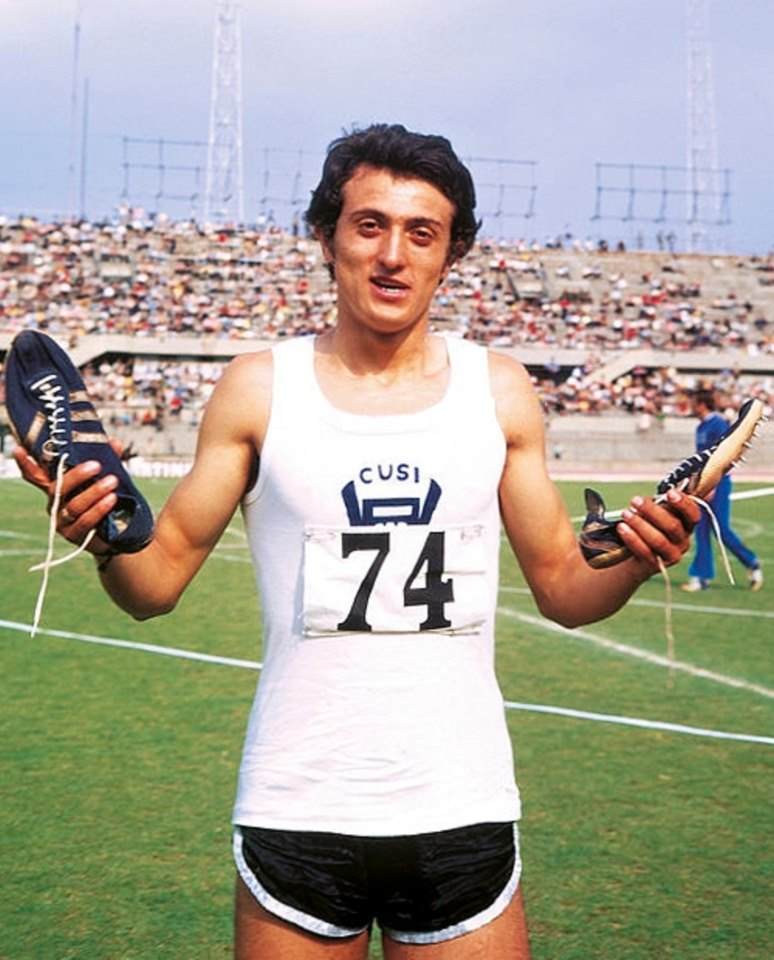
Pietro Mennea at the 1975 Summer Universiade

Event	Gold		Silver		Bronze	
100 metres (wind: 0.0 m/s)	Pietro Mennea (ITA)	10.28 GR	Charles Hopkins (USA)	10.47	Toma Petrescu (ROM)	10.66
200 metres (wind: 0.0 m/s)	Pietro Mennea (ITA)	20.28	Robert Martin (CAN)	21.06	Thorsten Johansson (SWE)	21.15
400 metres	Jerzy Pietrzyk (POL)	46.26	Roger Jenkins (GBR)	46.55	Brian Saunders (CAN)	46.83
800 metres	Waldemar Gondek (POL)	1:50.04	Pavel Litovchenko (URS)	1:50.13	Sid Ali Djouadi (ALG)	1:50.19
1500 metres	Thomas Wessinghage (FRG)	3:39.73	Steve Heidenreich (USA)	3:40.56	Gheorghe Ghipu (ROM)	3:41.19
5000 metres	Franco Fava (ITA)	13:37.56	Ilie Floroiu (ROM)	13:39.20	Julian Goater (GBR)	13:42.02
10,000 metres	Franco Fava (ITA)	28:37.92	Ilie Floroiu (ROM)	28:52.49	Jim Brown (GBR)	29:03.54
110 metres hurdles (wind: 0.0 m/s)	Charles Foster (USA)	13.83	Eduard Pereverzev (URS)	13.94	Borisav Pisić (YUG)	14.28
400 metres hurdles	Rolf Ziegler (FRG)	50.43	Jerzy Hewelt (POL)	50.85	Timo Ogunjimi (NGR)	51.25
3000 metres steeplechase	Bronisław Malinowski (POL)	8:22.32	Michael Karst (FRG)	8:28.22	Kazimierz Maranda (POL)	8:29.23
4 × 100 metres relay	Soviet Union (URS); Nikolay Kolesnikov; Juris Silovs; Sergey Vladimirtsev; Aleksandr Zhidkikh	39.80	Canada (CAN); Marvin Nash; Albin Dukowski; Robert Martin; Brian Sanders	40.06	West Germany (FRG); Klaus-Dieter Bieler; Klaus Ehl; Reinhard Borchert; Dieter Steinmann	40.20
4 × 400 metres relay	Poland (POL); Waldemar Szlendak; Jerzy Pietrzyk; Jerzy Hewelt; Waldemar Gondek	3:09.13	Yugoslavia (YUG); Milorad Čikić; Ivica Ivičak; Milorad Savić; Dragan Životić	3:09.71	Soviet Union (URS); Vladimir Nosenko; Pavel Kozban; Nikolay Yavtushenko; Aleksandr Bratchikov	3:10.09
High jump	Enzo del Forno (ITA)	2.13	István Major (HUN)	2.13	Danial Temim (YUG)	2.13
Pole vault	François Tracanelli (FRA)	5.20	Bruce Simpson (CAN)	5.20	Renato Dionisi (ITA)	5.10
Long jump	Grzegorz Cybulski (POL)	8.27 GR	Nenad Stekić (YUG)	8.13	Aleksey Pereverzev (URS)	7.90
Triple jump	Michał Joachimowski (POL)	16.54	Anatoliy Piskulin (URS)	16.52	Sergey Sidorenko (URS)	16.42
Shot put	Bishop Dolegiewicz (CAN)	19.45	Anatoliy Yarosh (URS)	19.11	Valcho Stoev (BUL)	18.90
Discus throw	Markku Tuokko (FIN)	62.94	Ferenc Tégla (HUN)	58.10	Igor Spasovkhodskiy (URS)	57.80
Hammer throw	Aleksey Spiridonov (URS)	73.82	Walter Schmidt (FRG)	72.00	Yuriy Sedykh (URS)	71.32
Javelin throw	Gheorghe Megelea (ROM)	81.30 GR	Bill Schmidt (USA)	80.20	Ivan Morgol (URS)	78.44
Decathlon	Sepp Zeilbauer (AUT)	7857	Philippe Bobin (FRA)	7568	Winfried Hartweck (FRG)	7382

=== Women's events ===
Event	Gold		Silver		Bronze	
100 metres (wind: 0.0 m/s)	Lyudmila Zharkova (URS)	11.31	Mona-Lisa Pursiainen (FIN)	11.47	Patty Loverock (CAN)	11.57
200 metres (wind: 0.0 m/s)	Pirjo Häggman (FIN)	23.38	Mona-Lisa Pursiainen (FIN)	23.61	Jelica Pavličić (YUG)	23.78
400 metres	Pirjo Häggman (FIN)	51.80 GR	Inta Kļimoviča (URS)	52.25	Jelica Pavličić (YUG)	52.50
800 metres	Nina Morgunova (URS)	2:01.94	Jozefína Čerchlanová (TCH)	2:02.45	Nikolina Shtereva (BUL)	2:02.74
1500 metres	Ellen Wellmann (FRG)	4:08.72	Natalia Andrei (ROM)	4:08.84	Rositsa Pekhlivanova (BUL)	4:10.17
3000 metres	Natalia Andrei (ROM)	8:54.09	Thelma Wright (CAN)	8:54.94	Svetlana Ulmasova (URS)	8:55.88
100 metres hurdles (wind: 0.0 m/s)	Grażyna Rabsztyn (POL)	13.14	Bożena Nowakowska (POL)	13.34	Tatyana Anisimova (URS)	13.64
4 × 100 metres relay	Soviet Union (URS); Inta Kļimoviča; Tatyana Anisimova; Marina Sidorova; Lyudmila Zharkova	44.77	Poland (POL); Ewa Długołęcka; Aniela Szubert; Barbara Bakulin; Grażyna Rabsztyn	44.87	France (FRA); Cécile Cachera; Danielle Camus; Jacqueline Curtet; Rose-Aimée Bacoul	45.88
High jump	Galina Filatova (URS)	1.88	Sara Simeoni (ITA)	1.88	Alla Fedorchuk (URS)	1.86
Long jump	Jarmila Nygrýnová (TCH)	6.48	Dorina Catineanu (ROM)	6.34	Alina Gheorghiu (ROM)	6.32
Shot put	Elena Stoyanova (BUL)	18.99	Mihaela Loghin (ROM)	18.21	Rima Makauskaitė (URS)	18.06
Discus throw	Mariya Vergova (BUL)	65.28	Argentina Menis (ROM)	64.28	Radostina Bakhchevanova (BUL)	56.96
Javelin throw	Nadezhda Yakubovich (URS)	61.72	Kate Schmidt (USA)	60.36	Éva Zörgő (ROM)	59.50
Pentathlon	Jane Frederick (USA)	4442	Djurdja Focic (YUG)	4423	Olga Rukavishnikova (URS)	4313

== Medal table ==
Rank	Nation	Gold	Silver	Bronze	Total
1	Soviet Union (URS)	7	5	11	23
2	Poland (POL)	7	3	1	11
3	Italy (ITA)	5	1	1	7
4	West Germany (FRG)	3	2	2	7
5	Finland (FIN)	3	2	0	5
6	Romania (ROM)	2	6	4	12
7	United States (USA)	2	4	0	6
8	Bulgaria (BUL)	2	0	4	6
9	Canada (CAN)	1	4	2	7
10	France (FRA)	1	1	1	3
11	Czechoslovakia (TCH)	1	1	0	2
12	Austria (AUT)	1	0	0	1
13	Yugoslavia (YUG)	0	3	4	7
14	Hungary (HUN)	0	2	0	2
15	Great Britain (GBR)	0	1	2	3
16	Algeria (ALG)	0	0	1	1
16	Nigeria (NGR)	0	0	1	1
16	Sweden (SWE)	0	0	1	1
Totals (18 entries)		35	35	35	105

== See also ==
- FISU World University Games
- University and college sport
