= Albin Dukowski =

Canadian sprinter

Personal information
- Nationality: Canadian
- Born: 4 June 1954 (age 72) Vancouver, British Columbia, Canada

Sport
- Sport: Sprinting
- Event: 4 × 100 metres relay
Medal record
Men's athletics
Representing Canada
Pan American Games
Bronze medal – third place	1975 Mexico City	4 x 100 m relay
Summer Universiade
Silver medal – second place	1975 Rome	4 x 100 m relay

Albin Dukowski (born 4 June 1954) is a Canadian sprinter. He competed in the men's 4 × 100 metres relay at the 1976 Summer Olympics. He won a bronze medal in the 1975 Pan American Games 4 × 100 metres relay (with Hugh Fraser, Marvin Nash, and Bob Martin).
