= Gregory Simons =

Bermudian sprinter (born 1958)

Personal information
- Nationality: Bermudian
- Born: 6 February 1958 (age 68)

Sport
- Sport: Sprinting
- Event: 100 metres

Gregory Simons (born 6 February 1958) is a Bermudian sprinter. He competed in the men's 100 metres at the 1976 Summer Olympics.
