= Hugh Fraser (athlete) =

Canadian sprinter (born 1952)

Hugh Fraser OC
Personal information
- Nationality: Canadian
- Born: 10 July 1952 (age 73) Kingston, Jamaica

Sport
- Sport: Sprinting
- Event: 200 metres
Medal record
Men's athletics
Representing Canada
Pan American Games
Bronze medal – third place	1975 Mexico City	4 x 100 m relay

Hugh Lloyd Fraser OC (born 10 July 1952) is a Canadian sprinter and jurist. He competed in the men's 200 metres at the 1976 Summer Olympics. He finished third in the 1975 Pan American Games 4 × 100 metres relay (with Marvin Nash, Albin Dukowski, and Bob Martin). Fraser also finished fifth in the 200 metres and sixth in the 100 metres at the 1975 Pan American Games. He was in the first induction of the Queen's University Track & Field Hall of Fame in 1994. He was also in the first induction of the Lisgar Collegiate Institute Athletic Wall of Fame, as part of the 160th Anniversary celebrations.

Fraser obtained his juris doctor degree in 1977. After working as a barrister in private practice, Fraser was appointed as a judge of the Ontario Court of Justice in 1993, where he served for 25 years, eventually becoming regional senior justice. He also served on the Canadian Human Rights Tribunal and the Dubin Commission of Inquiry (established in the aftermath of the Ben Johnson doping scandal).

He is the father of ice hockey player Mark Fraser.
