= Marvin Nash =

Canadian sprinter (1953–2023)

Personal information
- Nationality: Canadian
- Born: 7 December 1953 Kingston, Jamaica
- Died: 20 January 2023 (aged 69)

Sport
- Sport: Sprinting
- Event: 100 metres
Medal record
Men's athletics
Representing Canada
Pan American Games
Bronze medal – third place	1975 Mexico City	4 x 100 m relay
Summer Universiade
Silver medal – second place	1975 Rome	4 x 100 m relay

Marvin Nash (7 December 1953 – 20 January 2023) was a Canadian sprinter who competed in the men's 100 metres at the 1976 Summer Olympics.

He won a silver medal at the 1975 Summer Universiade 4 × 100 metres relay (with Al Dukowski, Bryan Saunders, and Bob Martin) and a bronze medal in the 1975 Pan American Games in the same category (with Hugh Fraser, Albin Dukowski, and Bob Martin). He also competed at the 1978 Commonwealth Games and the 1979 Pan American Games.

In the early 1990s, Nash went to prison for selling crack cocaine to an undercover police officer.
