= Dennis Trott =

Bermudian sprinter

Personal information
- Nationality: Bermudian
- Born: 20 July 1955 (age 70)

Sport
- Sport: Sprinting
- Event: 100 metres

Dennis Trott (born 20 July 1955) is a Bermudian sprinter. He competed in the men's 100 metres at the 1976 Summer Olympics.

Trott competed for the Jackson State Tigers track and field team in the NCAA.
