= Prydz =

Prydz may refer to:

== People ==
- Alvilde Prydz (1846–1922), Norwegian novelist
- Eric Prydz (born 1976), Swedish musician
- Frithjof Prydz (1943–1992), Norwegian ski jumper and tennis player
- Frithjof Prydz (judge) (1841–1935), Norwegian judge
- Hans Prydz (1868–1957), Norwegian politician
- Peter Blankenborg Prydz (1776–1827), Norwegian military officer

== Other uses ==
- Prydz Bay, an embayment of Antarctica
