= 1978 European Athletics Championships – Men's javelin throw =

Men's javelin throw at the European Athletics Championships

The men's javelin throw at the 1978 European Athletics Championships was held in Prague, then Czechoslovakia, at Stadion Evžena Rošického on 29 and 30 August 1978.

== Medalists ==
Gold	Michael Wessing; West Germany
Silver	Nikolay Grebnyev; Soviet Union
Bronze	Wolfgang Hanisch; East Germany

== Results ==
=== Final ===
30 August

Rank	Name	Nationality	Result	Notes
1st place, gold medalist(s)	Michael Wessing	West Germany	89.12	
2nd place, silver medalist(s)	Nikolay Grebnyev	Soviet Union	87.82	
3rd place, bronze medalist(s)	Wolfgang Hanisch	East Germany	87.66	
4	Detlef Michel	East Germany	85.46	
5	Helmut Schreiber	West Germany	83.58	
6	Miklós Németh	Hungary	83.58	
7	Piotr Bielczyk	Poland	81.80	
8	Terje Thorslund	Norway	80.42	
9	Ferenc Paragi	Hungary	79.08	
10	Sándor Boros	Hungary	78.78	
11	Pentti Sinersaari	Finland	77.10	
12	Seppo Hovinen	Finland	73.08	
13	Antero Puranen	Finland	72.74	
	Vasiliy Yershov	Soviet Union	DQ	Doping^{†}

^{†}: Vasiliy Yershov ranked initially 5th (85.06m), but was disqualified for infringement of IAAF doping rules.

=== Qualification ===
29 August

Rank	Name	Nationality	Result	Notes
1	Ferenc Paragi	Hungary	86.04	Q
2	Nikolay Grebnyev	Soviet Union	85.18	Q
3	Helmut Schreiber	West Germany	85.16	Q
4	Wolfgang Hanisch	East Germany	84.50	Q
5	Antero Puranen	Finland	84.42	Q
6	Miklós Németh	Hungary	83.48	Q
7	Sándor Boros	Hungary	83.22	Q
8	Pentti Sinersaari	Finland	82.46	Q
9	Michael Wessing	West Germany	81.84	Q
10	Seppo Hovinen	Finland	80.94	Q
11	Detlef Michel	East Germany	80.48	Q
12	Terje Thorslund	Norway	80.22	Q
13	Piotr Bielczyk	Poland	80.06	Q
14	Kenth Eldebrink	Sweden	78.60	
15	Bjørn Grimnes	Norway	78.58	
16	Josef Hanák	Czechoslovakia	78.56	
17	Raimo Pihl	Sweden	78.42	
18	Per-Eric Smiding	Sweden	76.36	
19	Peter Yates	Great Britain	75.82	
20	Tomáš Babiak	Czechoslovakia	75.20	
21	Tudorel Pirvu	Romania	75.14	
22	Vincenzo Marchetti	Italy	71.80	
	Vasiliy Yershov	Soviet Union	DQ	Q^{†}

^{†}: Vasiliy Yershov initially reached the final, but was disqualified later for infringement of IAAF doping rules.

== Participation ==
According to an unofficial count, 23 athletes from 12 countries participated in the event.

- Czechoslovakia (2)
- East Germany (2)
- Finland (3)
- Hungary (3)
- Italy (1)
- Norway (2)
- Poland (1)
- Romania (1)
- Sweden (3)
- Soviet Union (2)
- Great Britain (1)
- West Germany (2)
