= Athletics at the 1976 Summer Olympics – Men's javelin throw =

Men's javelin throw at the Games of the XXI Olympiad
- Venue: Olympic Stadium
- Date: 25–26 July 1976
- Competitors: 23 from 15 nations
- Winning distance: 94.58 WR

Medalists
1st place, gold medalist(s)		Miklós Németh; Hungary
2nd place, silver medalist(s)		Hannu Siitonen; Finland
3rd place, bronze medalist(s)		Gheorghe Megelea; Romania

The Men's Javelin Throw event at the 1976 Summer Olympics in Montreal, Quebec, Canada, had an entry list of 23 competitors, with two qualifying groups (23 throwers) before the final (15) took place on Saturday Monday 26, 1976. The top twelve and ties, and all those reaching 79.00 metres advanced to the final. The qualification round was held on Sunday, July 25, 1976.

The winning margin was 6.66 metres which as of June 2024 remains the only time the men's javelin was won by more than six metres at the Olympics or the World Athletics Championships.

== Medalists ==
Gold	Miklós Németh; Hungary
Silver	Hannu Siitonen; Finland
Bronze	Gheorghe Megelea; Romania

== Abbreviations ==
- All results shown are in metres

Q	automatic qualification
q	qualification by rank
DNS	did not start
NM	no mark
OR	olympic record
WR	world record
AR	area record
NR	national record
PB	personal best
SB	season best

== Records ==
Standing records prior to the 1976 Summer Olympics
World Record	Klaus Wolfermann (FRG)	94.08 m	May 5, 1973	Leverkusen, West Germany
Olympic Record	Klaus Wolfermann (FRG)	90.48 m	September 3, 1972	Munich, West Germany

== Qualification ==
=== Group A ===
Rank	Overall	Athlete	Attempts			Result	Note
Rank	Overall	Athlete	1	2	3	Result	Note
1	1	Seppo Hovinen (FIN)	89.76	—	—	89.76 m	
2	2	Miklós Németh (HUN)	89.28	—	—	89.28 m	
3	6	Jorma Jaakola (FIN)	83.84	—	—	83.84 m	
4	7	Piotr Bielczyk (POL)	82.56	—	—	82.56 m	
5	8	Michael Wessing (FRG)	75.98	78.28	82.54	82.54 m	
6	9	Terje Thorslund (NOR)	82.52	—	—	82.52 m	
7	10	Jānis Lūsis (URS)	82.08	—	—	82.08 m	
8	14	Gheorghe Megelea (ROM)	80.28	—	—	80.28 m	
9	16	Hannu Siitonen (FIN)	79.38	—	—	79.38 m	
10	19	Sándor Boros (HUN)	77.60	77.18	70.06	77.60 m	
11	20	Ferenc Paragi (HUN)	73.54	77.48	75.76	77.48 m	

=== Group B ===
Rank	Overall	Athlete	Attempts			Result	Note
Rank	Overall	Athlete	1	2	3	Result	Note
1	3	Phil Olsen (CAN)	87.76	—	—	87.76 m	
2	4	Sam Colson (USA)	72.28	71.74	86.64	86.64 m	
3	5	Vasyl Yershov (URS)	85.68	—	—	85.68 m	
4	10	Amado Morales (PUR)	82.08	—	—	82.08 m	
5	12	Valentin Dzhonev (BUL)	75.66	80.84	—	80.84 m	
6	13	Bjørn Grimnes (NOR)	73.74	80.32	—	80.32 m	
7	15	Anthony Hall (USA)	79.56	—	—	79.56 m	
8	17	Jacques Aye Abehi (CIV)	74.76	78.40	70.10	78.40 m	
9	18	Richard George (USA)	X	78.32	64.96	78.32 m	
10	21	Óskar Jakobsson (ISL)	72.78	71.90	X	72.78 m	
11	22	Ghassan Faddoul (LIB)	X	54.92	53.90	54.92 m	
—	—	Urs von Wartburg (SUI)	X	X	X	NM	

== Final ==
Rank	Athlete	Attempts						Result	Note
Rank	Athlete	1	2	3	4	5	6	Result	Note
1st place, gold medalist(s)	Miklós Németh (HUN)	94.58	—	—	83.32	84.76	86.84	94.58 m	WR
2nd place, silver medalist(s)	Hannu Siitonen (FIN)	87.92	X	86.58	X	X	80.92	87.92 m	
3rd place, bronze medalist(s)	Gheorghe Megelea (ROM)	87.16	83.16	82.92	82.10	X	X	87.16 m	
4	Piotr Bielczyk (POL)	X	77.90	86.50	81.00	82.28	82.94	86.50 m	
5	Sam Colson (USA)	77.70	85.08	86.16	X	X	X	86.16 m	
6	Vasyl Yershov (URS)	85.26	X	77.06	X	78.32	82.50	85.26 m	
7	Seppo Hovinen (FIN)	83.46	83.92	84.26	X	X	X	84.26 m	
8	Jānis Lūsis (URS)	79.74	77.58	73.76	74.00	X	80.26	80.26 m	
9	Michael Wessing (FRG)	78.44	X	79.06				79.06 m	
10	Terje Thorslund (NOR)	78.24	X	76.48				78.24 m	
11	Phil Olsen (CAN)	X	X	77.70				77.70 m	
12	Amado Morales (PUR)	71.30	X	75.54				75.54 m	
13	Bjørn Grimnes (NOR)	X	73.24	74.88				74.88 m	
14	Valentin Dzhonev (BUL)	73.16	X	73.88				73.88 m	
15	Anthony Hall (USA)	X	68.92	71.70				71.70 m	
—	Jorma Jaakola (FIN)	—	—	—				DNS	
