= Athletics at the 1979 Pan American Games – Men's javelin throw =

Men's javelin throw at the 1979 Pan American Games
- Venue: Estadio Sixto Escobar
- Dates: 8 July
- Winning distance: 84.16

Medalists
Gold medal	Duncan Atwood	United States
Silver medal	Antonio González	Cuba
Bronze medal	Raúl Pupo	Cuba

The men's javelin throw competition of the athletics events at the 1979 Pan American Games took place at the Estadio Sixto Escobar. The defending Pan American Games champion was Sam Colson of the United States.

== Records ==
Prior to this competition, the existing world and Pan American Games records were as follows:

World record	Miklós Németh (HUN)	94.58	Montreal, Canada	July 25, 1976
Pan American Games record	Sam Colson (USA)	83.82	Mexico City, Mexico	1975

== Results ==
All distances shown are in meters.

KEY:	WR	World Record	GR	Pan American Record

=== Final ===
Rank	Name	Nationality	Distance	Notes
1st place, gold medalist(s)	Duncan Atwood	United States	84.16	GR
2nd place, silver medalist(s)	Antonio González	Cuba	84.12	
3rd place, bronze medalist(s)	Raúl Pupo	Cuba	81.96	
4	Phil Olsen	Canada	76.28	
5	Amado Morales	Puerto Rico	76.00	
6	Rod Ewaliko	United States	75.78	
7	Angel Garmendia	Argentina	72.24	
8	Denes Pajtas	Canada	65.70	
	Mario Sotomayor	Colombia	DNS	
