= Antonio González (javelin thrower) =

Cuban javelin thrower

Medal record

Men's athletics

Representing Cuba

Pan American Games
Silver medal – second place	1979 San Juan	Javelin

Representing Americas

IAAF World Cup
Bronze medal – third place	1979 Montreal	Javelin

Antonio González (born 13 July 1956) is a Cuban former javelin thrower. He set a personal best of 85.66 m (281 ft 1/4 in) in 1982 (with the old javelin design). He was a silver medallist at the 1979 Pan American Games (behind winner Duncan Atwood by only four centimetres) and was bronze medallist at the 1979 IAAF World Cup.

He won his first international medal as a teenager, taking the silver behind compatriot Reinaldo Patterson at the 1975 Central American and Caribbean Championships in Athletics. He won his sole regional title at the 1982 Central American and Caribbean Games with a games record throw of 78.74 m (258 ft 4 in). He returned four years later to take the bronze medal.

== International competitions ==
Year	Competition	Venue	Position	Notes
1975	Central American and Caribbean Championships	Ponce, Puerto Rico	2nd	68.46 m
1978	Central American and Caribbean Games	Medellín, Colombia	1st	78.74 m
1979	IAAF World Cup	Montreal, Canada	3rd	83.44 m^{1}
1979	Pan American Games	San Juan, Puerto Rico	2nd	84.12 m
1982	Central American and Caribbean Games	Havana, Cuba	3rd	74.86 m

^{1}Representing the Americas

== See also ==
- List of Pan American Games medalists in athletics (men)
