= Athletics at the 1977 Summer Universiade – Men's javelin throw =

The men's javelin throw event at the 1977 Summer Universiade was held at the Vasil Levski National Stadium in Sofia on 22 and 23 August.

== Medalists ==
Gold	Silver	Bronze
Vasiliy Yershov; Soviet Union	David Ottley; Great Britain	Valentin Dzhonev; Bulgaria

== Results ==
=== Qualification ===
Rank	Group	Athlete	Nationality	Result	Notes
1	?	Vasiliy Yershov	Soviet Union	82.14	
2	?	Manfred Ahlert	East Germany	79.84	
3	?	Juan Jarvis	Cuba	77.92	
4	?	Helmut Schreiber	West Germany	77.80	
5	?	Wolfgang Balster	East Germany	76.32	
6	?	Valentin Dzhonev	Bulgaria	76.16	
7	?	Anatoliy Zherebtsov	Soviet Union	76.06	
8	?	David Ottley	Great Britain	75.70	
9	?	Rod Ewaliko	United States	75.14	
10	?	John Corazza	Canada	75.04	
11	?	Carol Raduly	Romania	73.28	
12	?	Piotr Bielczyk	Poland	71.64	
13	?	Antero Puranen	Finland	70.74	
14	?	François Ganongo	Congo	70.32	
15	?	Stefan Stoykov	Bulgaria	69.70	

=== Final ===
Rank	Athlete	Nationality	Result	Notes
1st place, gold medalist(s)	Vasiliy Yershov	Soviet Union	81.60	
2nd place, silver medalist(s)	David Ottley	Great Britain	81.14	
3rd place, bronze medalist(s)	Valentin Dzhonev	Bulgaria	79.76	
4	Helmut Schreiber	West Germany	79.56	
5	Manfred Ahlert	East Germany	78.68	
6	Juan Jarvis	Cuba	77.52	
7	Anatoliy Zherebtsov	Soviet Union	76.92	
8	Rod Ewaliko	United States	75.52	
9	John Corazza	Canada	74.38	
10	Piotr Bielczyk	Poland	73.70	
11	Carol Raduly	Romania	73.66	
12	Wolfgang Balster	East Germany	72.06	
