= Doping in the United States =

Doping, or the use of restricted performance-enhancing drugs in the United States occurs in different sports, most notably in the sports of baseball and football.

As of a 2024 study, 2.2% of U.S. athletes have self-reported to using anabolic steroids, peptide hormones, or blood manipulation. When beta-2 agonist inhalers and marijuana are included, 9.2% of athletes have self-reported themselves as having used in-competition prohibited substances.

== Prevalence and frequency ==
The United States has had ten Olympic medals stripped or returned for doping, specifically by Rick DeMont (1972 due to mishandling of medication declaration), Marion Jones (5 medals in 2000), Antonio Pettigrew and Jerome Young (2000), Lance Armstrong (2000), Tyler Hamilton (2004), and Tyson Gay (2012).

According to a 2024 peer-reviewed study published in the journal of Sports Medicine, between 6.5 and 9.2% of US athletes self-reported using one or more prohibited methods in a survey. A 2024 study from the University of Chicago reported a 2.2% doping prevalence rate for use of anabolic steroids, peptide hormones, and blood manipulation. When beta-2 agonist inhalers, marijuana or other in-competition prohibited substances were included, 9.2% of athletes reported themselves as having doped.

== History ==
Restrictions regarding drug use like synthetic hormones by athletes for enhanced performance in competition did not come around until the 20th century. The International Olympic Committee (IOC) established its initial list of prohibited substances in 1967 and introduced the first drug tests at the France and Mexico Olympic Games in 1968. Thirty years later, the World Anti-Doping Agency (WADA) was founded. WADA was founded at a time when individual governments, sport federations, and the IOC all had differing definitions, policies, and sanctions for doping. WADA bridged these differences by setting unified anti-doping standards and coordinating the efforts of sports organizations and public authorities worldwide.

The United States, a WADA Foundation board member, followed suit by establishing the United States Anti-Doping Agency (USADA) in 2000. USADA is recognized by the United States Congress as the official anti-doping agency for Olympic, Pan American and Paralympic sport in the United States. The agency has adjudication powers and abides by WADA's World Anti-Doping Code ("Code"), which provides the global framework for anti-doping policies, rules, and regulations. Doping in sports is generally defined as using a prohibited / banned substance; however, WADA expanded the definition to include breaking one or more of eight anti-doping rules within the Code, which range from presence of a prohibited substance in an athlete's test sample to administering or attempting to administer a prohibited substance or method to an athlete. As of December 19, 2008, the Code banned 192 performance-enhancing drugs, substances, and methods.

Similar to the definitional disputes the international community faced in the 1990s, national professional sports leagues in the U.S. approach anti-doping policy differently and independently of U.S. government regulation, WADA guidelines, and one another. This is not a big issue for WADA because the athletes participating in these leagues do not compete internationally, i.e. at the Olympics or World Championships. The leagues do not have the same list of banned substances or tests they require players to abide by, may not provide tests or sanctions for use of some prohibited substances, and negotiate their anti-doping policies with their respective players associations through collective bargaining.

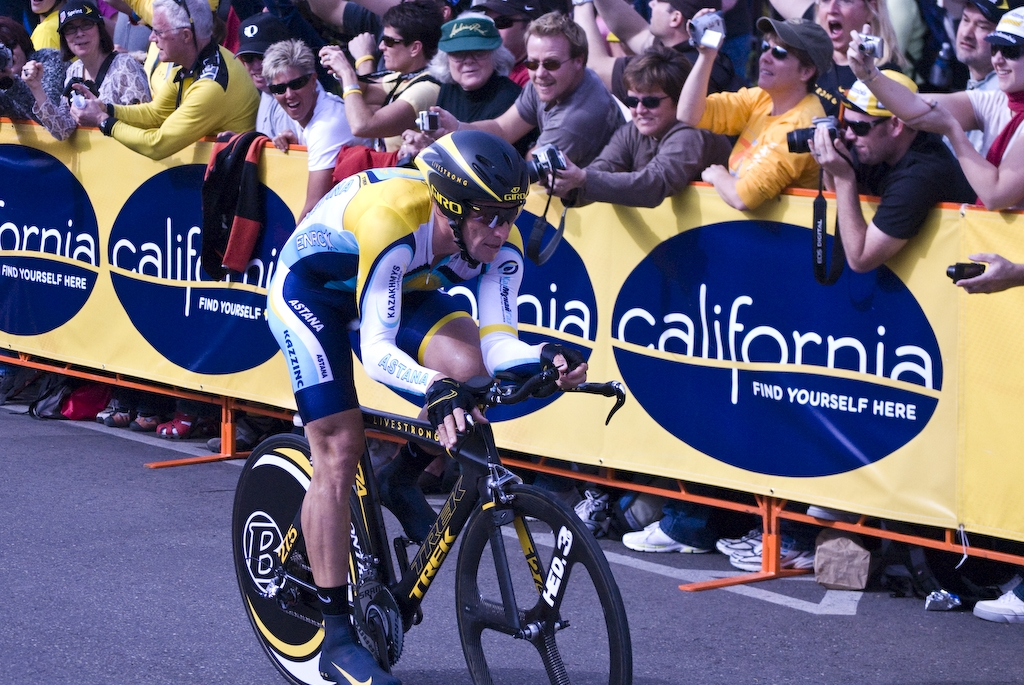
Lance Armstrong said he first doped when he was 21 years old.

In 2005, the United States House Committee on Oversight and Government Reform took an active interest on anti-drug policies in professional sports by opening an investigation into the matter following heightened media activity on steroid use in Major League Baseball (MLB). The use, possession, distribution, dispensing, or selling of steroids is a punishable federal offense under the Controlled Substances Act which, in addition to steroids, lists other performance-enhancing drugs and substances as Schedule III drugs. A series of Schedule III drugs were held, most notably with MLB, the National Football League (NFL), and the National Basketball Association (NBA). Each league's anti-drug policy was compared to that of the IOC, and each fell short of the IOC requirements. Response to the congressional investigation by sports league representatives resulted largely with push back and a "we can police our own" mentality, but the Committee felt differently and introduced the Clean Sports Act, one of six bills introduced that year in both chambers —addressing the need to adopt uniform national anti-drug policy standards among professional sports leagues that are consistent with, and as stringent as, those enforced by the USADA. While most of the bills were voted out of committee, none were enacted. As of 2013, professional sports leagues continue to negotiate their anti-doping policies privately through collective bargaining.

=== The advent of anabolic steroid use in the United States ===
The father of anabolic steroids in the United States was John Ziegler (1917–1983), a physician for the U.S. weightlifting team in the mid-20th century. In 1954, on his tour to Vienna with his team for the world championship, Ziegler learned from his Russian colleague that the Soviet weightlifting team's success was due to their use of testosterone as a performance-enhancing drug. Deciding that U.S. athletes needed chemical assistance to remain competitive, Ziegler worked with the CIBA Pharmaceutical Company to develop an oral anabolic steroid. This resulted in the creation of methandrostenolone, which appeared on the market in 1960 under the brand name Dianabol.

The American specialist in doping, Max M. Novich, wrote: "Trainers of the old school who supplied treatments which had cocaine as their base declared with assurance that a rider tired by a six-day race would get his second breath after absorbing these mixtures." John Hoberman, a professor at the University of Texas in Austin, Texas, said six-day races were "de facto experiments investigating the physiology of stress as well as the substances that might alleviate exhaustion."

=== Olympic medals stripped ===
United States has had eight Olympic medals stripped for doping violations. In the case of swimmer Rick DeMont, the USOC has recognized his gold medal performance in the 1972 Summer Olympics in 2001, but only the IOC has the power to restore his medal, and it has as of 2017 refused to do so. DeMont originally won the gold medal in 4:00.26. Following the race, the IOC stripped him of his gold medal after his post-race urinalysis tested positive for traces of the banned substance ephedrine contained in his prescription asthma medication, Marax. The positive test following the 400-meter freestyle final also deprived him of a chance at multiple medals, as he was not permitted to swim in any other events at the 1972 Olympics, including the 1,500-meter freestyle for which he was the then-current world record-holder. Before the Olympics, DeMont had properly declared his asthma medications on his medical disclosure forms, but the USOC had not cleared them with the IOC's medical committee.

=== Revelations by the United States Olympic Committee's director Wade Exum ===
In 2003, Wade Exum, the United States Olympic Committee's director of drug control administration from 1991 to 2000, gave copies of documents to Sports Illustrated that revealed that some 100 American athletes failed drug tests from 1988 to 2000, arguing that they should have been prevented from competing in the Olympics but were nevertheless cleared to compete; among those athletes were Carl Lewis, Joe DeLoach and Floyd Heard. Before showing the documents to Sports Illustrated, Exum tried to use them in a lawsuit against USOC, accusing the organization of racial discrimination and wrongful termination against him and cover-up over the failed tests. His case was summarily dismissed by the Denver federal Court for lack of evidence. The USOC claimed his case "baseless" as he himself was the one in charge of screening the anti-doping test program of the organization and clarifying that the athletes were cleared according to the rules.

Exum's documents revealed that Carl Lewis had tested positive three times at the 1988 Olympics trials for minimum amounts of pseudoephedrine, ephedrine, and phenylpropanolamine, which were banned stimulants. Bronchodilators are also found in cold medication. Due to the rules, his case could have led to disqualification from the Seoul Olympics and suspension from competition for six months. The levels of the combined stimulants registered in the separate tests were 2 ppm, 4 ppm and 6 ppm. Lewis defended himself, claiming that he had accidentally consumed the banned substances. After the supplements that he had taken were analyzed to prove his claims, the USOC accepted his claim of inadvertent use, since a dietary supplement he ingested was found to contain "Ma huang", the Chinese name for Ephedra (ephedrine is known to help weight loss). Fellow Santa Monica Track Club teammates Joe DeLoach and Floyd Heard were also found to have the same banned stimulants in their systems, and were cleared to compete for the same reason. The highest level of the stimulants Lewis recorded was 6 ppm, which was regarded as a positive test in 1988 but is now regarded as negative test. The acceptable level has been raised to ten parts per million for ephedrine and twenty-five parts per million for other substances. According to the IOC rules at the time, positive tests with levels lower than 10 ppm were cause of further investigation but not immediate ban. Neal Benowitz, a professor of medicine at UC San Francisco who is an expert on ephedrine and other stimulants, agreed that "These [levels] are what you'd see from someone taking cold or allergy medicines and are unlikely to have any effect on performance." Following Exum's revelations the IAAF acknowledged that at the 1988 Olympic Trials the USOC indeed followed the correct procedures in dealing with eight positive findings for ephedrine and ephedrine-related compounds in low concentration. Additionally, in 1988 the federation reviewed the relevant documents with the athletes' names undisclosed and stated that "the medical committee felt satisfied, however, on the basis of the information received that the cases had been properly concluded by the USOC as 'negative cases' in accordance with the rules and regulations in place at the time and no further action was taken".

== Doping by sport ==
Substance	Athlete population	Percentage of athletes using substance (2014)
Any substance banned by WADA	Elite athletes across sports (positive drug tests)	2% over past year
Anabolic steroids	Professional football players (self report)	9% used at some point in career
Opiates	Professional football players (self report)	52% used at some point in career (71% of those misused at some point in career)
Smokeless tobacco	Professional basketball players (self report)	35%–40% over past year
	Professional football players (self report)	20%–30% over past year

=== National Collegiate Athletic Association ===
- NCAA banned substances

=== Major League Baseball ===
==== The Mitchell Report ====
In December 2007 US Senator George Mitchell released Report to the Commissioner of Baseball of an Independent Investigation into the Illegal Use of Steroids and Other Performance Enhancing Substances by Players in Major League Baseball. Major League Baseball asked Mitchell to conduct an independent investigation to see how bad steroid use was in baseball. In the report Mitchell covers many topics and he interviewed over 700 witnesses. He covers the effects of steroids on the human body. He also touches on human growth hormone effects. He reports on baseball's drug testing policies before 2002 and the newer policies after 2002. Mitchell also named 86 players in the report that had some kind of connection to steroids. Among those named were: Andy Pettitte, Roger Clemens, Barry Bonds, and Eric Gagne. To finish his report, Mitchell made suggestions to the Commissioner of Baseball about drug testing and violations of the drug testing policies. Mitchell also reported that he would provide evidence to support the allegations made against such players and would give them the opportunity to meet with him and give them a fair chance to defend themselves against the allegations. The report also includes a paper trail of evidence that states, "Former Mets club house attendant, Kirk Randomski sent performing enhancement drugs to the players mentioned in the report." Quinn, T.J. and Thompson, Teri Daily News Sports Writers [New York, N.Y.] CT. (2007):66

See also

- Major League Baseball drug policy
- Banned substances in baseball in the United States
- List of Major League Baseball players named in the Mitchell Report
- List of Major League Baseball players suspended for performance-enhancing drugs
- Biogenesis baseball scandal
- Pittsburgh drug trials

==== Drug tests ====
Doping is easily spotted in blood when someone is being drug tested, unless the athlete is microdosing, gene doping, or unethically using therapeutic use exemptions. Drug tester can immediately look at the antigen pattern of the red blood cells. When these blood cells present different genetic markers, the doping can be spotted very easily. There are two types of doping tests; in-competition tests and out-of-competition tests, meaning that athletes can be tested any time and anywhere whether they are in season or not.

===== Test and frequency of tests =====
According to MLB rules all players are subject to random urine testing during the season as well as once during spring training; there is no limit to the amount of random drug testing during the season. However, in off-seasons players are only subject to random urine testing for DHEA (formally known as dehydroepiandrosterone, is a performance-enhancing drug. It is a predecessor to testosterone, meaning it results in increased testosterone levels in the body, and therefore increased muscle mass) and performance-enhancing drugs.

Players are also subject to announced blood tests for the use of human growth hormone (HGH) during the season, off-seasons, and spring training.

In addition players are subject to testing for performance-enhancing drugs and DHEA if there is reasonable cause to believe the player is doping. If there is any information provided that a player has bought, sold, used, or possessed these drugs they are subject to testing.

There is however, exemption from these rules if banned substances are being used for therapeutic purposes. Players with documented and valid medical prescriptions for these banned substances will be granted a Therapeutic Use Exemption (TUE), and are thus exempt from punishment. In other words, players with a TUE for prohibited substances do not violate the program by possessing or using that substance.

=== Professional cycling ===
In the early 1980s the United States had not had success on the international level of men's cycling since the 1912 Summer Olympics and only sporadic success in women's cycling. Greg LeMond became an international phenom in the early 1980s but he jumped directly to the pro level in Europe and was never under the tutelage of USA Cycling. Doping was commonplace on an international level at this time, although LeMond was never implicated in any doping incident throughout his entire career.

Prior to the 1984 Summer Olympics the US cycling team had hired Polish coach Eddie Borysewicz to compete with the traditional international powerhouses of East Germany and the Soviet Union, who used extensive doping programs. Borysewicz would introduce the team to blood doping, a practice that was frowned upon among clean sport purists, but not something that was illegal at that time in international competition or the Olympics. The United States cycling team won several medals at the 1984 Olympics, men and women, although they did so without the Eastern Bloc nations competing as they boycotted the games.

Following the success of the Olympics, as well as the success of LeMond who won the Tour de France on three occasions and Andy Hampsten who won the 1988 Giro d'Italia cycling gained popularity in the United States. As a result, a new generation of American cyclists emerged, many of whom would compete at the highest level including Lance Armstrong, Bobby Julich, George Hincapie, Tyler Hamilton, Fred Rodriguez, Kevin Livingston and Floyd Landis. While there was exposure to doping in America, it was nowhere near as rampant as it was in Europe and American cyclists found some success including Armstrong at the 1993 World Championship. By the time many of the cyclists reached pro teams however, they found that they could not compete among the best in the sport as this was the beginning of the EPO era in cycling. This did not first come to light among fans and reporters until the 1998 Festina Affair, but even this major incident was not enough to change the practices of most pro level riders and teams.

Armstrong would go on to win seven Tour de France victories in a row (his titles have since been revoked), and the year after he retired Floyd Landis would win the Tour. Not long after the victory of Landis however, it was declared that he failed a drug test and had his win revoked. Also around this time Olympic medalist Tyler Hamilton, who had left Armstrong and the US Postal team a few years earlier to find success elsewhere, became involved in the Operation Puerto doping scandal.

When Armstrong made his comeback to cycling prior to the 2009 Tour de France it brought increased scrutiny on both him, as well as the sport in general. When Landis returned from his suspension and asked for Armstrong's help to get on a top-level team prior to the 2010 Tour de France, Armstrong refused as Landis was a convicted doper, and this prompted Landis to come forward to USADA for the first time.

In 2012, Lance Armstrong, was charged by USADA with using performance-enhancing drugs, although he had denied it throughout his career and had never failed a drugs test. The Lance Armstrong doping case is based on blood samples from 2009 and 2010 and testimonies from cyclists and other members of staff on Armstrong's former teams. On August 23, 2012, Armstrong announced that he would not be fighting the USADA's charges. On August 24, 2012, the USADA banned Armstrong for life and removed all his results from August 1998 and thereafter. In 2013, Armstrong finally admitted to cheating with performance-enhancing drugs, including EPO, human growth hormone, and testosterone, describing his career of cheating as "one big lie".

In recent history no American rider has been involved in a major doping scandal. Internationally there have still been incidents, including Operation Aderlass, but the sport has been far more strict and severe when it comes to complicity, systematic team doping and doping of any kind. While no American has reached the pinnacle of the sport by winning Olympic Gold, the Tour de France or World Championship in recent years there have been numerous Americans who have had success riding cleanly at the highest level including Andrew Talansky, Tejay van Garderen, Ben King, Joe Dombrowski and Chris Horner. In 2021, the US Anti-Doping Agency banned Katherine Compton for doping, and in 2022, banned USA Cycling National Masters Team Sprint Coach Brian Abers.

=== National Football League ===
In 2009, nearly one in ten retired National Football League (NFL) players polled in a confidential survey said they had used now-banned anabolic steroids while still playing. 16.3 percent of offensive linemen admitted using steroids, as did 14.8 percent of defensive linemen.

The NFL banned substances policy has been acclaimed by some and criticized by others, but the policy is the longest running in American professional sports, beginning in 1987. The current policy of the NFL suspends players without pay who test positive for banned substances as it has since 1989: four games for the first offense (a quarter of the regular season), eight games for a second offense (half of the regular season), and 12 months for a third offense. The suspended games may be either regular season games or playoff games.

While recently MLB and the NHL decided to permanently ban athletes for a third offense, they have long been resistant to such measures, and random testing is in its infancy.

Since the NFL started random, year-round tests and suspending players for banned substances, many more players have been found to be in violation of the policy. By April 2005, 111 NFL players had tested positive for banned substances, and of those 111, the NFL suspended 54.

A new rule is in the works due to Shawne Merriman. Starting the 2007 season, the new rule would prohibit any player testing positive for banned substances from being able to play in the Pro Bowl that year.

==== Performance-enhancing drugs in the National Football League ====
===== NFL performance-enhancing drug policy =====
Since steroid testing began in 1987, the NFL has made strides to discourage steroid use through their testing policies and procedures. According to nflcommunications.com, The NFL collects more than 14,000 tests each year which is more than any other professional sport league. But there are also 53 players in each team, so this does not necessarily mean, there are more tests per player, compared to other leagues. Furthermore, players are contacted with little time before their testing date, and any player who fails to test is referred to disciplinary review. The NFL has committed to testing for a wide array of Performance Enhancing drugs, Starting in 2011 the NFL implemented random blood test for the use of the human growth hormone (HGH). NFL sanctions include a minimum four-game suspension for first-time offenders, six-game suspension for second-time offenders, and a year suspension for third-time offenders. All NFL suspensions are without pay, to further discourage performance-enhancing drug use.

==== Drug tests ====
===== Test and frequency of tests =====
According to NFL rules all players are subject to pre-employment, annual, seasonal, post-seasonal, and off-season urine testing. Each week of the regular season and post-season ten players on each club are randomly selected for testing. During the off-season players under contract may be testing up to six times.

===== Agencies that perform tests =====
All specimens are collected by an authorized specimen collector under the authority of the Collection Vendor and analyzed at the appropriate laboratory. All testing and enforcement is done through the Independent Administrator (IPA).

===== Historical performance-enhancing drug studies in the NFL =====
In 2009 researchers conducted a survey of 2552 retired football players. The survey reported that anabolic steroids were introduced to the National Football League as early as 1963. Steroids use became so prevalent that players suspected that 90% of the NFL had used steroids. In addition to these rough statistics, Offensive-Lineman Pat Donovan suggested that up to 70% of the Dallas Cowboys offensive line had been using steroids. In 1990, a survey to 120 current NFL athletes reported that 67% of Offensive Lineman used steroids. At the conclusion of the survey, researchers found that out of 2552 ex-NFL players, 9.1% self reported using anabolic steroids during their career. Furthermore, 16.3% of Offensive lineman and 14.8% of defensive lineman surveyed reported using steroids during their careers.

===== Recent developments in performance-enhancing drug use in the NFL =====
The widespread use of performance -enhancing drugs in the NFL has been an ongoing problem. Within the last eight years, three defensive rookies of the year have been charged with using illegal performance-enhancing drugs. After reading such facts, there seems to be a strong correlation between success in the National Football league and the use of illegal performance-enhancing drugs. Furthermore, as these rookies were identified as cheaters, they were disciplined mildly with a suspension of four games.

Sportswriter Mike Freeman recalls a Hall of Fame Coach telling him that "For every one or two PED (performance-enhancing drug) cheats the NFL catches, 10 go free. Maybe 20". Widespread steroid use is extremely common in the NFL, oftentimes going unnoticed by the authorities. In a study of steroid cases surrounding the 2004 Super Bowl, statistics show that multiple players were discovered as steroid users. Furthermore, the study shows that those specific cases were never formally documented. "The NFL says it tests players randomly, without warning, throughout the year. And yet there's no record of these players ever testing positive".

===== HGH testing =====
The House Committee on Oversight and Government Reform revisited the NFL's anti-drug policy on December 12, 2012, specifically as it relates to testing for human growth hormone (HGH). The collective bargaining agreement that ended the NFL lockout in August 2011 included a provision for HGH testing as soon as the 2012–2013 season — but only once the NFL Players Association approved the process. However, as of February 2013 testing had not yet begun because both parties continue to disagree on a number of issues relating to the accuracy of the testing and whether the test is valid for NFL players. Adolpho Birch, the NFL's senior vice president for law and labor policy, stated the following when interviewed by The New York Times in February 2013: "It has been a stall. I don't know if it's a tactic. There is absolutely no reason for this to have taken this long and us not have testing implemented. We should have been more than a year into this by now."

=== National Basketball Association ===
The National Basketball Association (NBA) first developed its anti-drug policy with the NBA Players Association in 1983. Only eight players have been caught and suspended for the use of performance-enhancing drugs, most serving 5-, 10-, and 20-game suspensions:

- 2000: Don MacLean (steroids)
- 2001: Matt Geiger (steroids)
- 2002: Soumaila Samake (anabolic steroid: nandralone)
- 2007: Lindsey Hunter (stimulant: phentermine)
- 2008: Darius Miles (stimulant: phentermine)
- 2009: Rashard Lewis (steroid: DHEA)
- 2011: O. J. Mayo (steroid: DHEA)
- 2013: Hedo Türkoğlu (anabolic steroid: methenolone)

Several other players have been banned for testing positive for illegal drugs four times, mostly for cocaine use. Under the 1983 policy, such players are eligible to reapply for reinstatement after two years.

==== Drug tests ====
===== Test and frequency of tests =====
All players are subject to four random tests per season. An accused player has five days to request a retest. There is also reasonable cause testing (If there is reason to believe a player is violating drug rules the NBA will hold a hearing to determine if there is reasonable cause to do a drug test).

==== See also ====
- 2010 NBA Collective Bargaining Agreement Highlights

=== National Hockey League ===
==== List of banned compounds ====
Drugs that are banned in the National Hockey League (NHL) are determined by the World Anti-Doping Agency's (WADA) list of prohibited performance-enhancing substances. From here there are recommendations made to the NHL and the National Hockey League Players' Association (NHLPA) as to which performance-enhancing substances are relevant to the sport of hockey.

==== Drug tests ====
===== Test and frequency of tests =====
According to NHL rules, drug testing procedures are similar during training camp, regular season and playoffs. Each club is subject to team-wide, no-notice testing once during training camp. Teams will be selected at random for testing during the regular season and individual players will be randomly selected throughout the season. Tests are conducted at work on the day of practice but not on game days. Throughout the off-season, a maximum of 60 drug tests randomly, without notice.

===== Procedural details =====
A player's refusal to test, tampering with tests, or failed test will result in a positive test result. Such results are subject to appeal to the impartial arbitrator within 48 hours of being notified by the Program Doctor. Disciplinary penalties for a positive test work as follows: All of which include mandatory referral to the SABH Program and possible treatment, if necessary.

1. First violation: a suspension of twenty (20) NHL Games without pay.
2. Second violation: a suspension of sixty (60) NHL Games without pay.
3. Third violation: a "permanent" suspension. A suspended player may reapply via the Program Committee for discretionary reinstatement after a minimum period of two years.

== United States Anti-Doping Agency ==
The United States Anti-Doping Agency (USADA, yoo-SAH-duh) is a non-profit, non-governmental 501(c)(3) organization and the national anti-doping organization (NADO) for the United States. To protect clean competition and the integrity of sport and prevent doping in the United States with a performance-enhancing substance, the USADA provides education, leads scientific initiatives, conducts testing, and oversees the results management process. Headquartered in Colorado Springs, Colorado, USADA is a signatory to the World Anti-Doping Code, which harmonizes anti-doping practices around the world, and is widely considered the basis for the strongest and strictest anti-doping programs to prevent doping in sport.

In 2001, USADA was recognized by the U.S. Congress as "the official anti-doping agency for Olympic, Pan American and Paralympic sport in the United States." While USADA is not a government entity, it is partly funded by the Office of National Drug Control Policy (ONDCP), with its remaining budget generated from contracts for anti-doping services with sport organizations, most notably the United States Olympic and Paralympic Committee (USOPC). The United States has also ratified the UNESCO International Convention against Doping in Sport, the first global international treaty against doping in sport, and largely relies on USADA to carry out this commitment.

Travis Tygart has been the chief executive officer of USADA since September 2007.

== Legal issues ==
Anti-doping policies instituted by individual sporting governing bodies may conflict with local laws. A notable case includes the National Football League (NFL) inability to suspend players found with banned susbstances; after it was ruled by a federal court, that local labor laws superseded the NFL's anti-doping regime. The challenge was supported by the National Football League Players Association.

In the U.S., anabolic steroids are currently listed as Schedule III controlled substances under the Controlled Substances Act, which makes the first offense simple possession of such substances without a prescription a federal crime punishable by up to one year in prison, and the unlawful distribution or possession with intent to distribute anabolic steroids punishable as a first offense by up to ten years in prison. EPO is a drug that may only be obtained through a medical practitioner's prescription. Professional cyclists that test positive for the drug are banned from professional road races for a minimum of two years on the first offense and banned for life on the second offense.

== Scandals ==
- BALCO Scandal
- Clemson University steroid scandal
- University of South Carolina steroid scandal
- Lance Armstrong

== See also ==
- Use of performance-enhancing drugs in sport
- Game of Shadows: Barry Bonds, BALCO, and the Steroids Scandal that Rocked Professional Sports, 2006 book
- Juiced: Wild Times, Rampant 'Roids, Smash Hits & How Baseball Got Big, a 2005 book by Jose Canseco that alleged widespread steroid use in baseball (including his own)
- L. A. Confidentiel, a book by David Walsh and Pierre Ballester about circumstantial evidence relating to allegations of doping by cyclist Lance Armstrong
- Drugs in the United States
- Doping in sport
- Doping in baseball
- World Anti-Doping Agency (WADA)
