= Nittedal =

Nittedal Municipality Nittedal kommune
- Municipality
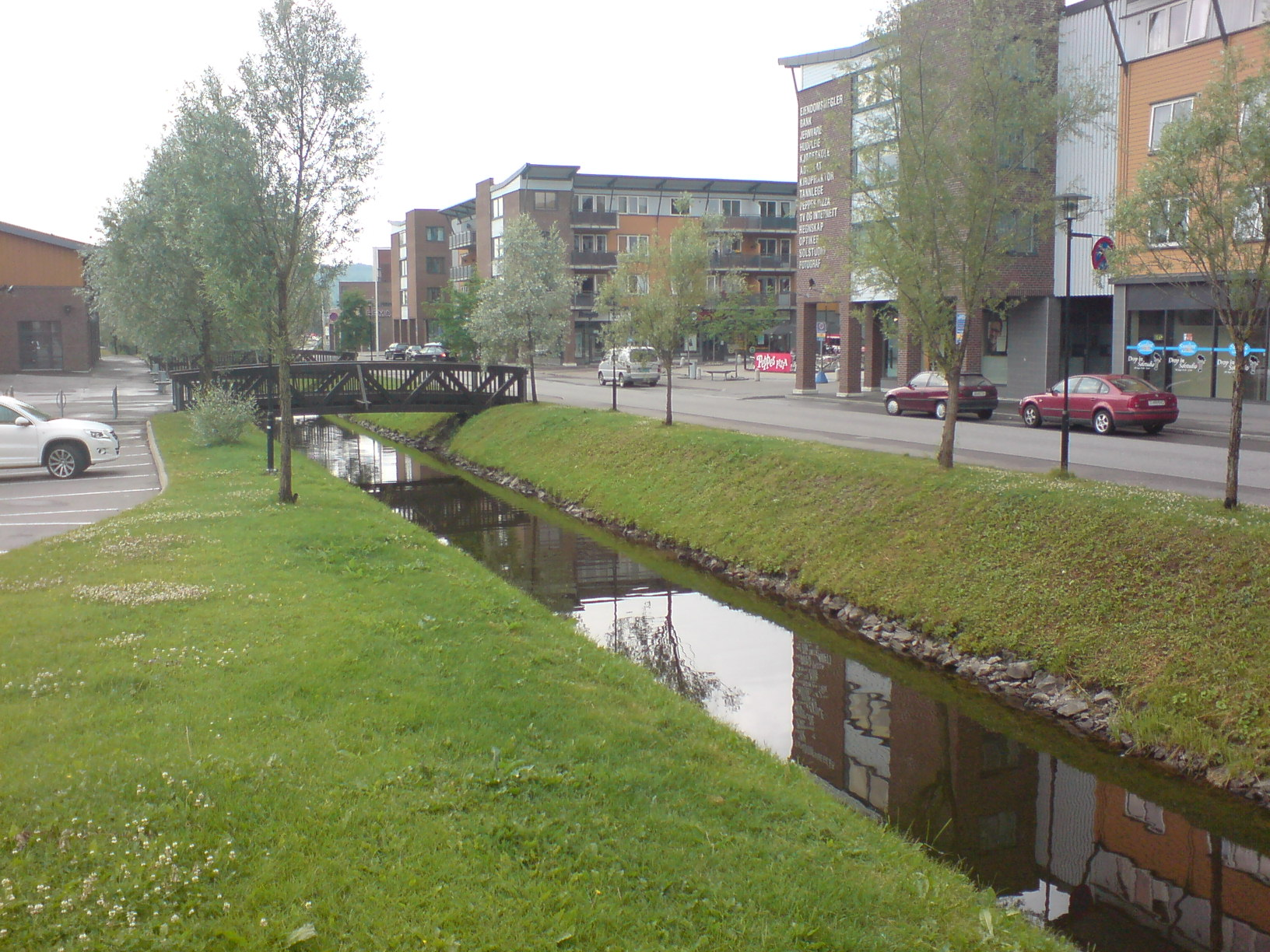

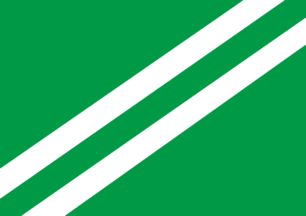
- Flag Coat of arms

- Akershus within Norway

- Nittedal within Akershus
- Coordinates: 60°4′23″N 10°52′20″E
- Country: Norway
- County: Akershus
- District: Romerike
- Administrative centre: Rotnes

Government
  - Mayor (2020): Inge Solli (V)

Area
  - Total: 186 km^{2} (72 sq mi)
  - Land: 179 km^{2} (69 sq mi)
  - Rank: #338 in Norway

Population (2006 Q2)
  - Total: 19,722
  - Rank: #47 in Norway
  - Density: 108/km^{2} (280/sq mi)
  - Change (10 years): ▲ +18%
- Demonym(s): Nittedøl or Nittedøling

Official language
  - Norwegian form: Bokmål
- Time zone: UTC+01:00 (CET)
  - Summer (DST): UTC+02:00 (CEST)
- ISO 3166 code: NO-3232
- Website: Official website

Nittedal is a municipality and city in Akershus county, Norway. It is part of the traditional region of Romerike. The administrative centre of the municipality is the village of Rotnes.

The parish of Nitedal was established as a municipality on 1 January 1838 (see formannskapsdistrikt).

== Name ==
The name (Old Norse: Nitjudalr) is an old district name. The first element is the genitive case of the river name Nitja (now Nitelva) and the last element is dalr which means "valley" or "dale". The meaning of the river name is unknown. Prior to 1918, the name was written "Nittedalen".

== Coat-of-arms ==
The coat-of-arms is from modern times. They were granted on 23 January 1987. The arms show the two silver lines running in a bend sinister direction on a green background. They represent the main transportation lines that run through the municipality from Oslo to other parts of the country: the main highway and the railroad, they also can represent skiing tracks, an old winter transportation method. At the same time the two lines symbolize matches, as one of Norway's oldest match factories was founded in Nittedal. The lines also symbolize tree logs, as forestry is of great importance for the local economy.

== Geography ==
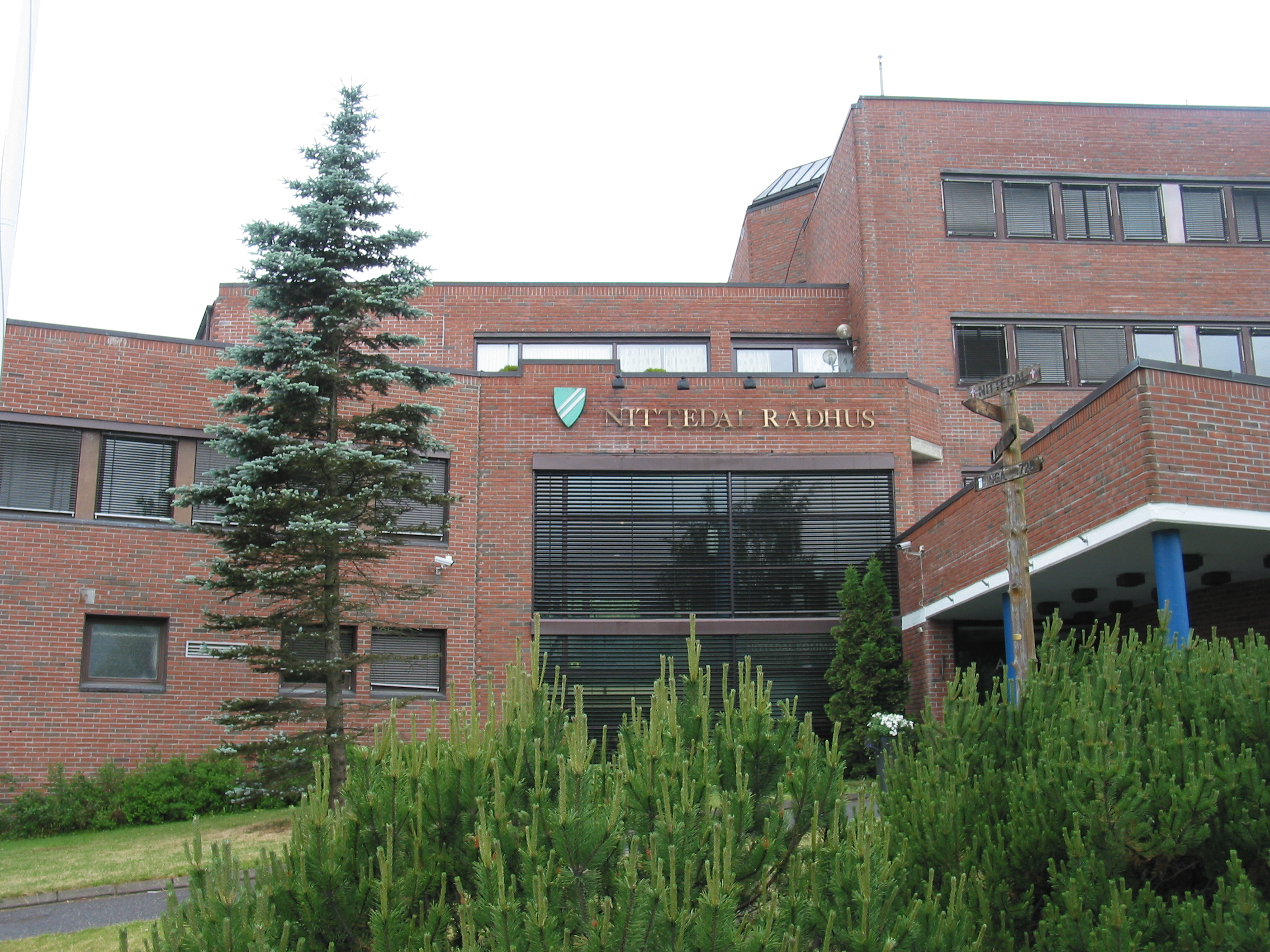
Nittedal town hall.

Nittedal lies directly northeast of Oslo and serves as a suburb to the capital. It is located on both sides of the Nitelva river. The southernmost population centre is Hagan. Further north lie the centres of Slattum, Rotnes, Åneby, Grønvoll, Varingskollen, and Hakadal.

== History ==
In 1902 the construction of the Gjøvik Line reached the west side of Nittedal, from Oslo and through the forest.

== Demography ==
Number of minorities (1st and 2nd generation) in Nittedal by country of origin in 2017
Ancestry	Number
Poland	462
Sri Lanka	329
Pakistan	303
Sweden	241
Vietnam	197
Lithuania	178
Denmark	139
Germany	103
India	103
Philippines	94

== Administration ==
Mayor Hilde Thorkildsen is on suspension from her position. As of July 2022, she is still under trial for corruption.

== Sister cities ==
The following cities are twinned with Nittedal:

- - Fredensborg, Region Hovedstaden, Denmark
- - Håbo, Uppsala County, Sweden
- - Ingå, Uusimaa, Finland

== Notable people ==
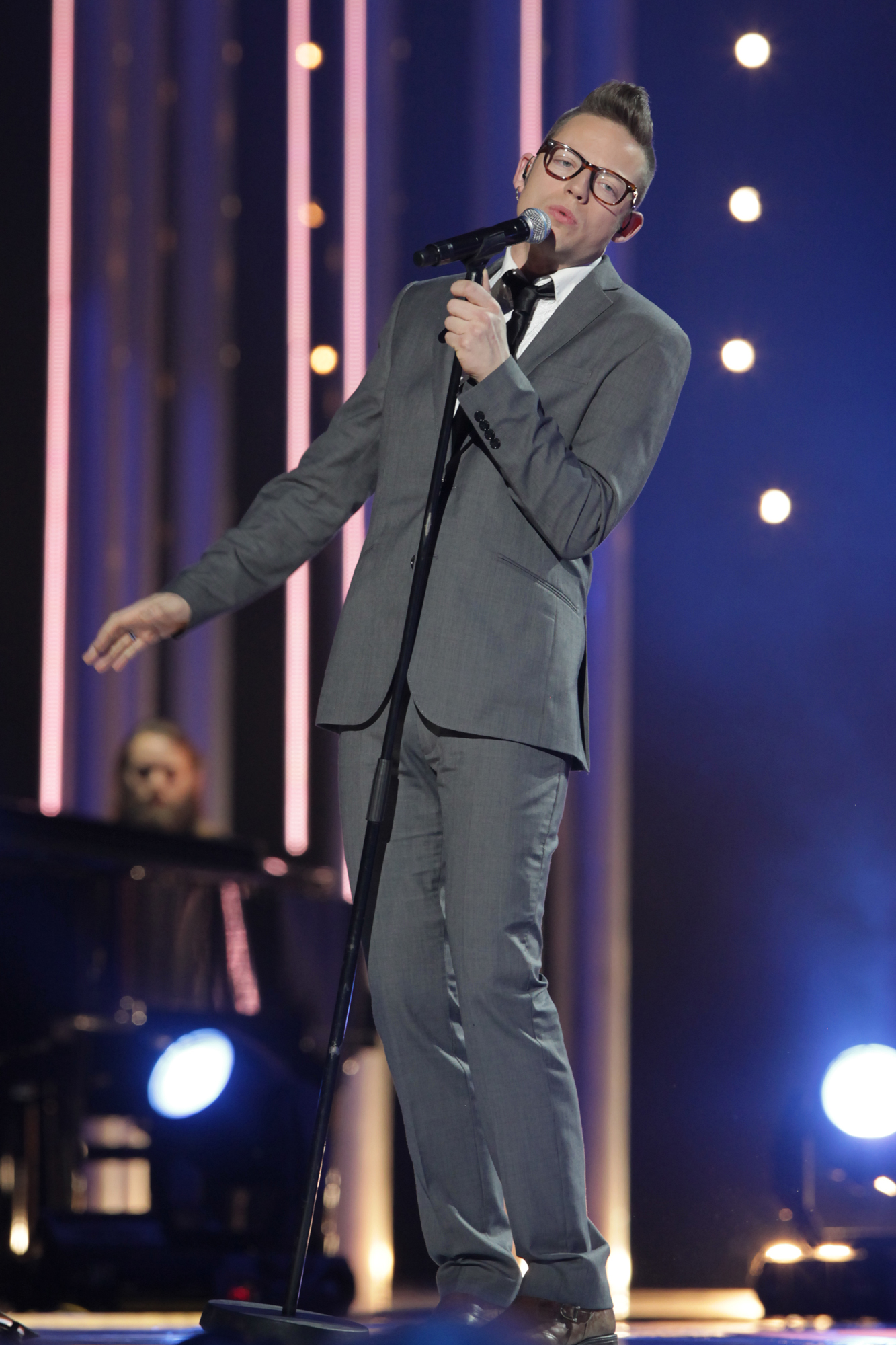
Jarle Bernhoft, 2011

This list includes people who were born or have resided in Nittedal:

- Peter Østbye (1855 in Nittedal - 1943) a philologist and academic administrator
- Svend Rasmussen Svendsen (1864 in Nittedal – 1945) a Norwegian American impressionist artist
- Hans Prydz (1868–1957) a physician and Mayor of Nittedal 1913/22 & 1928/34
- Gunnar Haarstad (1916 in Nittedal – 1992) a jurist, police officer, a resistance member during World War II, and head of the Norwegian Police Security Service for fifteen years
- Tor Brustad (1926 in Nittedal – 2016) a Norwegian biophysicist
- Nils Vogt (1926 in Hakadal – 2000) a Norwegian civil servant and diplomat
- Kjell Magne Yri (born 1943) a Norwegian priest and linguist, lives in Nittedal
- Inge Solli (born 1959) a Norwegian politician, deputy county Mayor of Akershus
- Ib Thomsen (born 1961) politician
- Jarle Bernhoft (born 1976 in Nittedal) stage name Bernhoft, singer, multi-instrumentalist, composer and lyricist
- Marte Wexelsen Goksøyr (born 1982 in Nittedal) an actress, public speaker, writer and public debater with Down syndrome

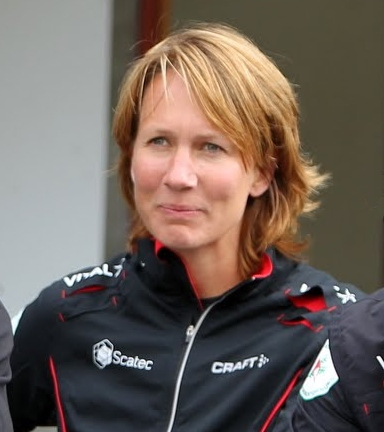
Hanne Staff, 2010

=== Sport ===
- Hroar Elvenes (1932 in Hakadal – 2014) a speed skater, competed in four Winter Olympics
- Odd Martinsen (born 1942) cross-country skier, multiple Olympic medallist, father of Bente Skari
- Terje Thorslund (born 1945) a former Norwegian champion javelin thrower
- Bente Skari (born 1972 in Nittedal) cross-country skier, multiple Olympic medallist
- Hanne Staff (born 1972 in Nittedal) an orienteering athlete
- Stine Bredal Oftedal (born 1991 in Nittedal) handball player, European, World, and Olympic champion
