= Athletics at the 1975 Pan American Games – Men's javelin throw =

Men's javelin throw at the Pan American Games

The men's javelin throw event at the 1975 Pan American Games was held in Mexico City on 17 October.

== Results ==
Rank	Name	Nationality	#1	#2	#3	#4	#5	#6	Result	Notes
1st place, gold medalist(s)	Sam Colson	United States	x	78.94	83.82	74.32	x	75.00	83.82	
2nd place, silver medalist(s)	Juan Jarvis	Cuba	77.63	80.00	77.20	79.74	78.06	82.30	82.30	
3rd place, bronze medalist(s)	Raúl Fernández	Cuba	77.08	77.90	76.94	77.20	x	74.14	77.90	
4	Anthony Hall	United States	64.32	70.22	73.92	x	77.88	x	77.88	
5	Phil Olsen	Canada	77.60	76.44	x	77.10	x	77.06	77.60	
6	André Lajoie	Canada	x	74.20	75.74	73.46	x	75.50	75.64	
7	Mario Sotomayor	Colombia							71.56	
8	Jorge Peña	Chile							69.80	
9	Paulo Irenne de Faria	Brazil							69.52	
10	Salomón Robins	Mexico							69.50	
11	José Peralta	Nicaragua							61.62	
