= Athletics at the 1983 Pan American Games – Men's javelin throw =

Men's javelin throw at the Pan American Games

The men's javelin throw event at the 1983 Pan American Games was held in Caracas, Venezuela on 28 August. It was the last time that men used the old model javelin at the Games.

== Results ==
Rank	Name	Nationality	Result	Notes
1st place, gold medalist(s)	Laslo Babits	Canada	81.40	
2nd place, silver medalist(s)	Ramón González	Cuba	78.34	
3rd place, bronze medalist(s)	Amado Morales	Puerto Rico	77.40	
4	Reinaldo Patterson	Cuba	77.00	
5	Curtis Ransford	United States	76.62	
6	José de Souza	Brazil	71.14	
7	Phil Olsen	Canada	68.84	
8	José Simancas	Venezuela	66.42	
9	Domingo Reyes	Nicaragua	60.76	
	Duncan Atwood	United States	DNS	
