= Faddoul =

Faddoul is a surname. Notable people with the surname include:

- Charla Baklayan Faddoul (born 1976), American reality television personality
- Ghassan Faddoul (born 1955), Lebanese long jumper and javelin thrower
- Simon Faddoul (born 1958), Apostolic Exarch of the Maronite Catholic Apostolic Exarchate of Western and Central Africa
