= Athletics at the 1973 Summer Universiade – Men's javelin throw =

The men's javelin throw event at the 1973 Summer Universiade was held at the Central Lenin Stadium in Moscow on 19 and 20 August.

== Medalists ==
Gold	Silver	Bronze
Jānis Zirnis; Soviet Union	Dmitriy Sitnikov; Soviet Union	Anthony Hall; United States

== Results ==
=== Qualification ===
Rank	Group	Athlete	Nationality	Result	Notes
1	?	Anthony Hall	United States	77.60	
2	?	Jānis Zirnis	Soviet Union	76.58	
3	?	Dmitriy Sitnikov	Soviet Union	75.00	
4	?	Raùl Fernández	Cuba	72.98	
5	?	Reinhard Lange	West Germany	72.70	
6	?	Pekka Lappalainen	Finland	72.54	
7	?	Bernard Werner	Poland	72.52	
8	?	Miklós Németh	Hungary	72.14	
9	?	Richard Dowswell	Canada	71.68	
10	?	Renzo Cramerotti	Italy	71.32	
11	?	Stefan Stoykov	Bulgaria	68.14	
12	?	Jujhar Singh	India	58.40	
13	?	Héctor Castro	Chile	53.62	
14	?	Eleazer Degbohr	Ghana	53.10	
15	?	Nimal Jayawickrema	Sri Lanka	45.84	

=== Final ===
Rank	Athlete	Nationality	Result	Notes
1st place, gold medalist(s)	Jānis Zirnis	Soviet Union	80.08	
2nd place, silver medalist(s)	Dmitriy Sitnikov	Soviet Union	79.65	
3rd place, bronze medalist(s)	Anthony Hall	United States	78.36	
4	Miklós Németh	Hungary	78.10	
5	Raùl Fernández	Cuba	75.16	
6	Bernard Werner	Poland	73.78	
7	Pekka Lappalainen	Finland	71.62	
8	Renzo Cramerotti	Italy	70.24	
9	Stefan Stoykov	Bulgaria	69.84	
10	Reinhard Lange	West Germany	69.00	
11	Richard Dowswell	Canada	68.12	
12	Jujhar Singh	India	60.64	
