= Amado Morales =

Puerto Rican javelin thrower

Amado Rigoberto Morales (born July 22, 1947) is a retired male javelin thrower from Puerto Rico, who competed for his native country during the 1970s and the 1980s.

== International competitions ==
Year	Competition	Venue	Position	Event	Notes
Representing Puerto Rico
1970	Central American and Caribbean Games	Panama City, Panama	1st	Javelin	76.40 m
1971	Central American and Caribbean Championships	Kingston, Jamaica	2nd	Javelin	74.38 m
1971	Pan American Games	Cali, Colombia	3rd	Javelin	76.14 m
1973	Central American and Caribbean Championships	Maracaibo, Venezuela	2nd	Javelin	70.94 m
1976	Olympic Games	Montreal, Canada	12th	Javelin	75.54 m
1978	Central American and Caribbean Games	Medellín, Colombia	2nd	Javelin	70.54 m
1979	Central American and Caribbean Championships	Guadalajara, Mexico	2nd	Javelin	77.70 m
1979	Pan American Games	San Juan, Puerto Rico	5th	Javelin	76.00 m
1982	Central American and Caribbean Games	Havana, Cuba	2nd	Javelin	79.36 m
1983	Pan American Games	Caracas, Venezuela	3rd	Javelin	77.40 m
1986	Central American and Caribbean Games	Santiago, Dominican Republic	5th	Javelin	67.00 m
