= Tor Brustad =

Norwegian biophysicist (1926–2016)

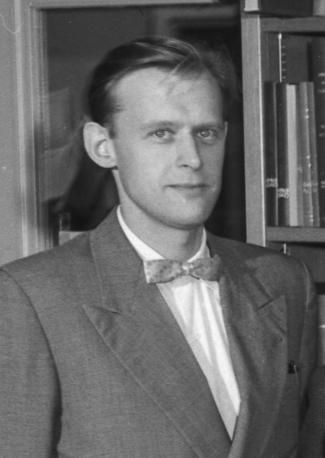
- Brustad in 1960
- Born: 20 December 1926; Nittedal, Norway
- Died: 12 September 2016 (aged 89)
- Occupation: Biophysicist
- Awards: Order of St Olav

Tor Brustad (20 December 1926 – 12 September 2016) was a Norwegian biophysicist.

== Personal life ==
Brustad was born in Nittedal on 20 December 1926, to schoolteacher Johan Ludvig Brustad and Aslaug Kristoffersen. He married Berte-Marie Bjørtomt in 1953.

== Career ==
Brustad studied physics at the University of Oslo and the University of California, Berkeley. He graduated as cand.mag. in 1951, cand.real. in 1953, and dr.philos. in 1962. He was assigned with the Norwegian Radium Hospital from 1960, and headed the department of medical physics from 1968. He was also appointed professor of radiation physics at the Norwegian Institute of Technology from 1970.

He was decorated Knight, First Class of Order of St. Olav in 1995, and was a fellow of the Norwegian Academy of Science and Letters and the Royal Norwegian Society of Sciences and Letters. He resided at Jar, and died in September 2016.
