= Grønvoll =

- Village
- Location in Akershus
- Coordinates: 60°6′56″N 10°51′26″E
- Country: Norway
- Region: Østlandet
- County: Akershus
- Municipality: Nittedal
- Time zone: UTC+01:00 (CET)
  - Summer (DST): UTC+02:00 (CEST)

Grønvoll is a village in the municipality of Nittedal, Norway. Its population (2005) is 1,530.
