= Clemson University steroid scandal =

1985 steroid use scandal

In January 1985, Sports Illustrated published an article on steroid and other prescription drug abuse in athletic programs at Clemson University, South Carolina, which came to light following the death of a world-class track athlete at the school. The article, titled "A Pipeline Full of Drugs" and written by Sports Illustrated's Bill Brubaker, alleged the widespread use of illegally obtained prescription drugs, including steroids, in a number of programs at the university. Following the article, several Clemson coaches were indicted and pleaded guilty to charges of illegal prescription drug distribution, and the scandal ultimately led to the resignation of these coaches, the athletic director, the head of campus police, and the university's president.

== "A Pipeline Full of Drugs" ==
"A Pipeline Full of Drugs" was featured in the January 21, 1985 issue of Sports Illustrated. The article begins with an account of the death of 23-year-old world-class track athlete, Augustinus Jaspers, in his dorm room at Clemson University, and the subsequent discovery by investigating police of unlabeled prescription drugs in his belongings. The story continues to describe the resignation of two Clemson coaches implicated in illegal distribution of such drugs, Stan Narewski, men's track and cross-country coach, and Sam Colson, women's track and cross-country coach and strength and conditioning coach, and their admission of supplying the drugs to student-athletes.

== Reaction ==
The month before the article ran in Sports Illustrated, an investigation by South Carolina's 13th Circuit Solicitor William Traxler was announced and South Carolina's State Law Enforcement Division (SLED) agents began interviewing Clemson student-athletes and their coaches. Based on the results of a two-month investigation, on March 4, 1985, a Pickens County grand jury indicted former track coaches Sam Colson and Stan Narewski and former assistant football coach Jack Harkness (the three had resigned in the wake of the scandal) on charges of illegally dispensing prescription drugs. During the investigation, both Colson and Narewski admitted to supplying the drugs to members of the track teams, and three football players stated that they had been given steroids by Colson, who was also the school's strength and conditioning coach.

== Outcome ==
Following the indictments, Colson and Narewski entered into plea-bargain agreements. On March 11, 1985, Circuit Judge C. Victor Pyle placed Colson on three years probation, ordered him to perform eight hours of community service a week for one year, and fined him $2,000. Narewski was sentenced to one year of probation, a $750 fine and ordered to perform eight hours of community service each week for six months. Due largely to dissatisfaction with the Clemson Board of Trustees refusal to support his push for reorganization of the school's athletic department in the wake of back-to-back scandals or his call for the resignation of long-time athletic director Bill McLellan; the university's president, William Atchley, stepped down on March 1, 1985, stating at the time, "There's no doubt about athletics being a political issue." Following a leave of absence, McLellan was replaced as athletic director by head golf coach, Bobby Robinson, on March 8, 1985. In reference to this period of turmoil surrounding Clemson athletics, Atchley would later state, "I think we were very sloppy. I think we did things very carelessly without thinking what they meant." On April 27, 1985, the head of Clemson University's public safety department, James C. Brummitt, resigned amid questions of why there was a delay of a month before details of the investigation were revealed to the school's president. The scandal came to a close on January 6, 1986, when Jack Harkness, pleaded guilty to charges of distributing steroids to athletes, and was given two suspended 18-month sentences, fined $1,000 and ordered to reimburse SLED for $1,000 for the agency's cost to extradite him back to South Carolina from Pittsburgh, PA.

In 1989, former Clemson track star Dave McKnight testified during the Dubin Inquiry that he and another Canadian, Desai Williams, took anabolic steroids while on scholarship at the school in 1979, and that the drugs were provided to them by their coach, Peter Cross, and that the program of doping was the idea of Sam Colson.

== See also ==
- Doping in the United States
- Doping in sport
