= Juan Jarvis =

Cuban javelin thrower

Personal information
- Full name: Juan Nicolás Jarvis Ocaña
- Nationality: Cuba
- Born: December 6, 1950 (age 75) Guantanamo, Cuba
Medal record
Javelin throw
Pan American Games
Silver medal – second place	1975 Mexico City	Javelin throw
Central American and Caribbean Games
Silver medal – second place	1974 Santo Domingo	Javelin throw
CAC Championships
Gold medal – first place	1971 Kingston	Javelin throw
Gold medal – first place	1977 Xalapa	Javelin throw

Juan Nicolás Jarvis Ocaña (born December 6, 1950, in Guantanamo, Cuba) is a former Cuban athlete. He is the fourth son of Esther Ocana Nolasco and Teodoro Jarvis.

Competing as a javelin thrower for more than 10 years, he participated in many international competitions as a part of the Cuban national team. At the 1971 Central American and Caribbean Championships in Athletics he won the gold medal. He won silver at both the 1974 Central American and Caribbean Games and the 1975 Pan American Games, and gold once again at the 1977 Central American and Caribbean Championships in Athletics.

== International competitions ==
Year	Competition	Venue	Position	Event	Notes
Representing Cuba
1970	Central American and Caribbean Games	Panama City, Panama	4th	Javelin throw (old)	69.52 m
1971	Central American and Caribbean Championships	Kingston, Jamaica	1st	Javelin throw (old)	77.20 m
1971	Pan American Games	Cali, Colombia	5th	Javelin throw (old)	71.60 m
1974	Central American and Caribbean Games	Santo Domingo, Dominican Republic	2nd	Javelin throw (old)	69.16 m
1975	Pan American Games	Mexico City, Mexico	2nd	Javelin throw (old)	82.30 m
1977	Central American and Caribbean Championships	Xalapa, Mexico	1st	Javelin throw (old)	77.54 m
1977	Universiade	Sofia, Bulgaria	6th	Javelin throw (old)	77.52 m
1977	World Cup	Düsseldorf, West Germany	5th	Javelin throw (old)	77.06 m^{1}

^{1}Representing the Americas
