= Dionisio Quintana =

Cuban javelin thrower (1957–2026)

Personal information
- Born: October 9, 1957 Holguín, Cuba
- Died: May 13, 2026 (aged 68)

Sport
- Sport: Track and field
Medal record
Representing Cuba
Central American and Caribbean Games
Gold medal – first place	1982 Havana	Javelin throw

Dionisio Quintana Viltres (October 9, 1957 – May 13, 2026) was a Cuban javelin thrower, who competed for his native country during the 1970s and the 1980s. He later became the trainer of Osleidys Menéndez. Quintana died on May 12, 2026, at the age of 68.

== International competitions ==
Year	Competition	Venue	Position	Event	Notes
Representing Cuba
1979	Central American and Caribbean Championships	Guadalajara, Mexico	3rd	Javelin	76.58 m
1979	Universiade	Mexico City, Mexico	11th	Javelin	74.10 m
1981	Central American and Caribbean Championships	Santo Domingo, Dominican Republic	2nd	Javelin	75.18 m
1981	World Cup	Rome, Italy	9th	Javelin	77.28 m^{1}
1982	Central American and Caribbean Games	Havana, Cuba	1st	Javelin	82.40 m

^{1}Representing the Americas

== Sources ==
- Dionisio Quintana at World Athletics
- Dionisio Quintana at InterSportStats
