= Peter Østbye =

Norwegian philologist and translator

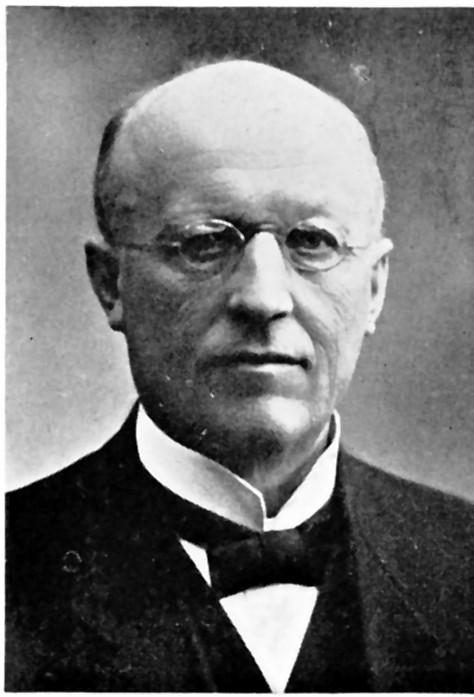
- Born: 20 February 1855; Nittedal, Norway
- Died: 2 February 1943 (aged 87)
- Citizenship: Norwegian
- Occupation: Classical philologist
- Writing career
- Language: Norwegian
- Period: 1934–1982
- Subject: Classical philology
- Notable awards: H.K.H. Kronprinsens (1887); Order of St. Olav (1927)

Peter Nielsen Østbye (20 February 1855 - Norway—2 February 1943) was a Norwegian philologist and academic administrator. He taught classical languages and was a proponent of learning the Latin language. He was an education official at Fredrikstad between 1894-1910 and at Drammen between 1910-1926. He is principally known for his translations of Homer's epic poems, the Iliad and the Odyssey from Ancient Greek into Norwegian.

== Biography ==
Østbye was born into a farming family at Nittedal in Akershus, Norway. He was the son of Nils Østbye (1814–1901) and Marie Petersen (1818–71). During his childhood, he moved to Skien, where he studied at the Latin school. In 1873, he graduated and obtained an Examen artium with Latin honor laudabilis præ cæteris. He first studied at the Polytechnic University in Dresden, but he resigned and chose to study classical philology at the University of Kristiania (now University of Oslo) where he graduated in 1881.

In 1883, Østbye received an award from the Hjelmstjerne-Rosenkrones legat which would finance further studies in classical philology, with emphasis on Latin at the Humboldt University of Berlin. In 1887, he won the Crown Prince's gold medal (Kronprinsens gullmedalje) for his thesis Om Plan og Komposition i Thukydids græske Historie ("Plan and composition of Thucydides's Greek stories"). The same year, he obtained a scholarship for his classical philology studies, and wrote an elementary thesis in German, entitled Die Zahl der Bürger von Athen im 5. Jahrhundert ("The number of inhabitants in Athens in the 5th century").

From 1882-94, he was a teacher and co-supervisor at Hauges Minde in Kristiania. In 1894, he was hired as director, and then became chancellor of Fredrikstad høiere almenskole in 1898. In 1910, he became chancellor at the Drammen Latin school until he retired in 1926. He was also a member of National Teaching Council (Undervisningsrådet) during 1909-24. Even though Østbye published a translation of Sophocles' Oedipus at Colonus in 1891, he performed most of his translation work within the last decades of his life. When he released a translation of Iliad in 1920, he was already 65 years old.

== Personal life ==
He was married twice; 1) in 1885 with Elise Mathilde Hoff (1855-1889), daughter of Hans Christian Martinus Hoff (1814–79) and Charlotte Meyn (1818-1911), 2) in 1897 with Elise Charlotte Meyn (1872-1926), daughter of Anton Meyn (1816–82) and Anna Fischer (1838-1930).

== Tributes ==
- He was nominated as a Knight 1st Class in the Order of St. Olav in 1927.
- In 1927, a Festschrift was published in tribute to Østbye and four of his co-workers.
- Rektor Østbyes Gate in Fredrikstad and Peter Østbyes gate in Drammen are both streets named in tribute to Peter Østbye.

== Translations ==
- Sophocles, Oedipus at Colonus in 1891;
- Homer, Iliad in 1920;
- Homer, Odyssey in 1922;
- Sophocles, Oedipus Rex in 1924;
- Sophocles, Antigone in 1924;
- Sophocles, Electra in 1924;
- Aeschylus, Oresteia in 1926;
- Euripides, Medea in 1928;
- Euripides, Iphigenia in Aulis in 1928;
- Euripides, Iphigenia in Tauris in 1928;
- Euripides, Hippolytus in 1928;
- Euripides, The Bacchae in 1928.

== Other sources ==
- (in Norwegian) Alv Storheid Langeland: «Peter Østbye», in Skolen og vi. Festskrift for Norsk Lektorlag ved 60-årsjubileet 1952.
- (in Norwegian) Salmonsens konversationsleksikon, Anden Udgave, chapter XXV, s. 866. København: J. H. Schulz, 1928.
