= Inge Solli =

Norwegian politician

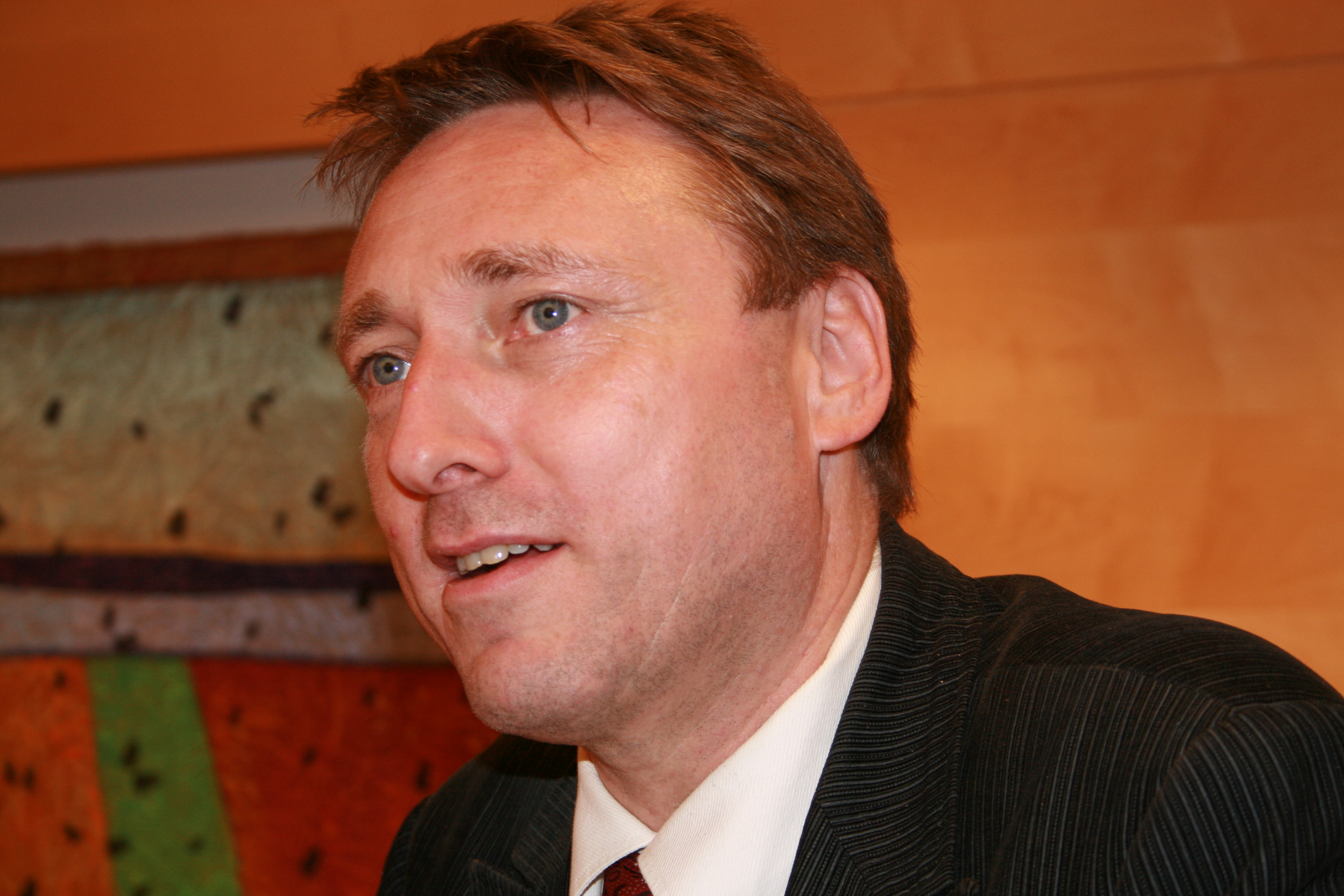
Inge Solli

Inge Hallgeir Solli (born 10 April 1959) is a Norwegian politician for the Liberal Party.

He served as a deputy representative to the Norwegian Parliament from Akershus during the term 2005–2009.

On the local level, he has been a member of Nittedal municipality council. Following the 2007 elections, Solli became the new deputy county mayor (fylkesvaraordfører) of Akershus.
