= Gheorghe Megelea =

Romanian javelin thrower

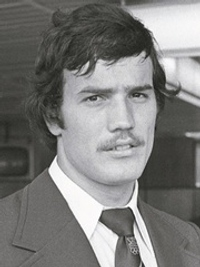

Personal information
- Born: 14 March 1954 (age 72) Reşiţa, Romania

Sport
- Sport: Athletics
- Event: Javelin throw
- Coached by: Daniel Maier; Alexandru Bizim

Achievements and titles
- Personal best: 88.00 m (1977)
Medal record
Representing Romania
Olympic Games
Bronze medal – third place	1976 Montreal	Javelin throw
Universiade
Gold medal – first place	1975 Rome	Javelin throw

Gheorghe Megelea (born 14 March 1954) is a retired Romanian javelin thrower who won a bronze medal at the 1976 Olympics. In 1977–78, he defected via Great Britain to Canada.
