= Athletics at the 1979 Summer Universiade – Men's javelin throw =

The men's javelin throw event at the 1979 Summer Universiade was held at the Estadio Olimpico Universitario in Mexico City on 11 and 13 September 1979.

== Medalists ==
| Gold | Silver | Bronze |
|---|---|---|
| Helmut Schreiber; West Germany | Arto Härkönen; Finland | Heino Puuste; Soviet Union |

== Results ==
=== Qualification ===
| Rank | Group | Athlete | Nationality | Result | Notes |
|---|---|---|---|---|---|
| 1 | ? | Heino Puuste | Soviet Union | 81.28 | |
| 2 | ? | Antero Puranen | Finland | 81.12 | |
| 3 | ? | Arto Härkönen | Finland | 80.60 | |
| 4 | ? | Helmut Schreiber | West Germany | 79.62 | |
| 5 | ? | Denes Pajtas | Canada | 79.36 | |
| 6 | ? | Toshihiko Takeda | Japan | 79.30 | |
| 7 | ? | Ioannis Peristeris | Greece | 78.34 | |
| 8 | ? | Reinaldo Patterson | Cuba | 77.62 | |
| 9 | ? | Valentin Dzonev | Bulgaria | 75.72 | |
| 10 | ? | Dionisio Quintana | Cuba | 75.08 | |
| 11 | ? | Ding Penglin | China | 73.16 | |
| 12 | ? | Peter Yates | Great Britain | 73.12 | |
| 13 | ? | Steve Kreider | United States | 72.16 | |
| 14 | ? | Stefan Stoykov | Bulgaria | 70.50 | |
| 15 | ? | Dainis Kūla | Soviet Union | 68.96 | |
| 16 | ? | Juan Puriel | Mexico | 65.00 | |
| 17 | ? | Tom Sinclair | United States | 63.66 | |
| 18 | ? | Inoussa Dangou | Benin | 60.84 | |
| 19 | ? | Enazi Al-Nasser | Kuwait | 49.28 | |

=== Final ===
| Rank | Athlete | Nationality | Result | Notes |
|---|---|---|---|---|
| 1st place, gold medalist(s) | Helmut Schreiber | West Germany | 88.68 | UR |
| 2nd place, silver medalist(s) | Arto Härkönen | Finland | 87.10 | |
| 3rd place, bronze medalist(s) | Heino Puuste | Soviet Union | 82.62 | |
| 4 | Antero Puranen | Finland | 81.94 | |
| 5 | Peter Yates | Great Britain | 80.26 | |
| 6 | Toshihiko Takeda | Japan | 77.86 | |
| 7 | Denes Pajtas | Canada | 77.58 | |
| 8 | Reinaldo Patterson | Cuba | 77.32 | |
| 9 | Ding Penglin | China | 75.42 | |
| 10 | Valentin Dzhonev | Bulgaria | 74.48 | |
| 11 | Dionisio Quintana | Cuba | 74.10 | |
| | Ioannis Peristeris | Greece | DNS | |
