= Jorma Jaakola =

Finnish javelin thrower

Personal information
- Nationality: Finnish
- Born: 13 June 1950 (age 76) Vihanti, Finland

Sport
- Sport: Athletics
- Event: Javelin throw

Jorma Jaakola (born 13 June 1950) is a Finnish athlete. He competed in the men's javelin throw at the 1976 Summer Olympics.
