= Peter Blankenborg Prydz =

Norwegian military officer (1776–1827)

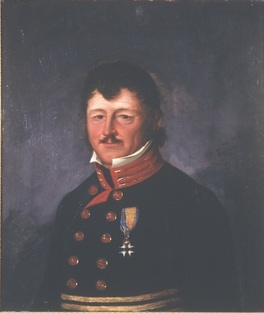
Peter Blankenborg Prydz

Peter Blankenborg Prydz (21 September 1776 – 6 March 1827) was a Norwegian military officer and representative at the Norwegian Constituent Assembly conducted at Eidsvoll during 1814. .

He was born in the neighborhood of Abelsøe in the Østensjø district of Oslo, Norway. He was the son of Anne Hedevig Brochmann (1752-1834) and Hans Prydz (1751-1781), and had three brothers. He was a great-grandfather of the politician Hans Prydz (1868-1957).

He began his military career as a commissioned officer at Nordenfjeldske infantry regiment. He rose to the rank of Major in 1825, before dying the next year.

Peter Blankenborg Prydz was elected to the Norwegian Constituent Assembly in 1814, representing the army regiment Nordenfjeldske Infanteri-Regiment. At Eidsvoll, he belonged to the independence party (Selvstendighetspartiet).

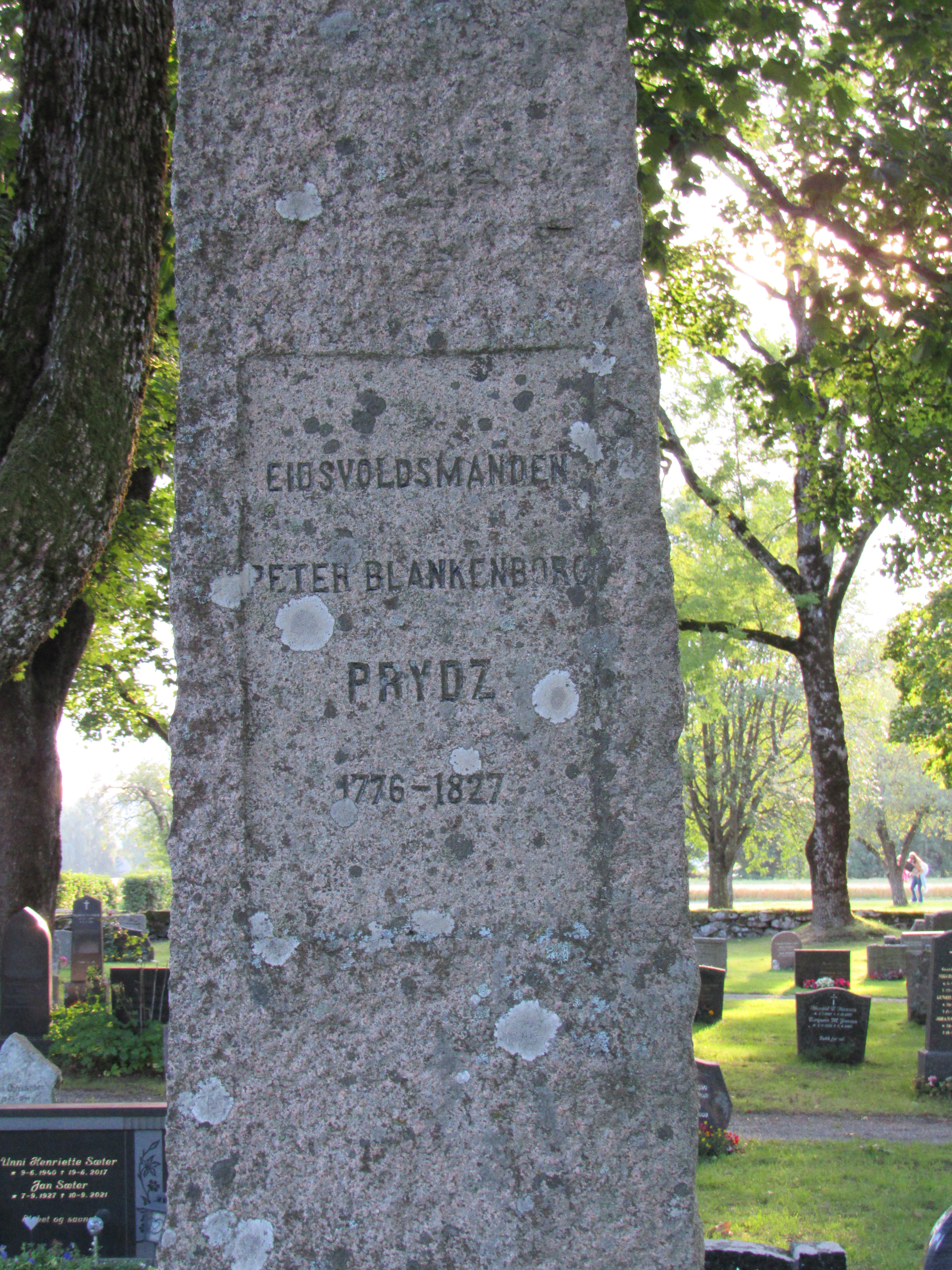

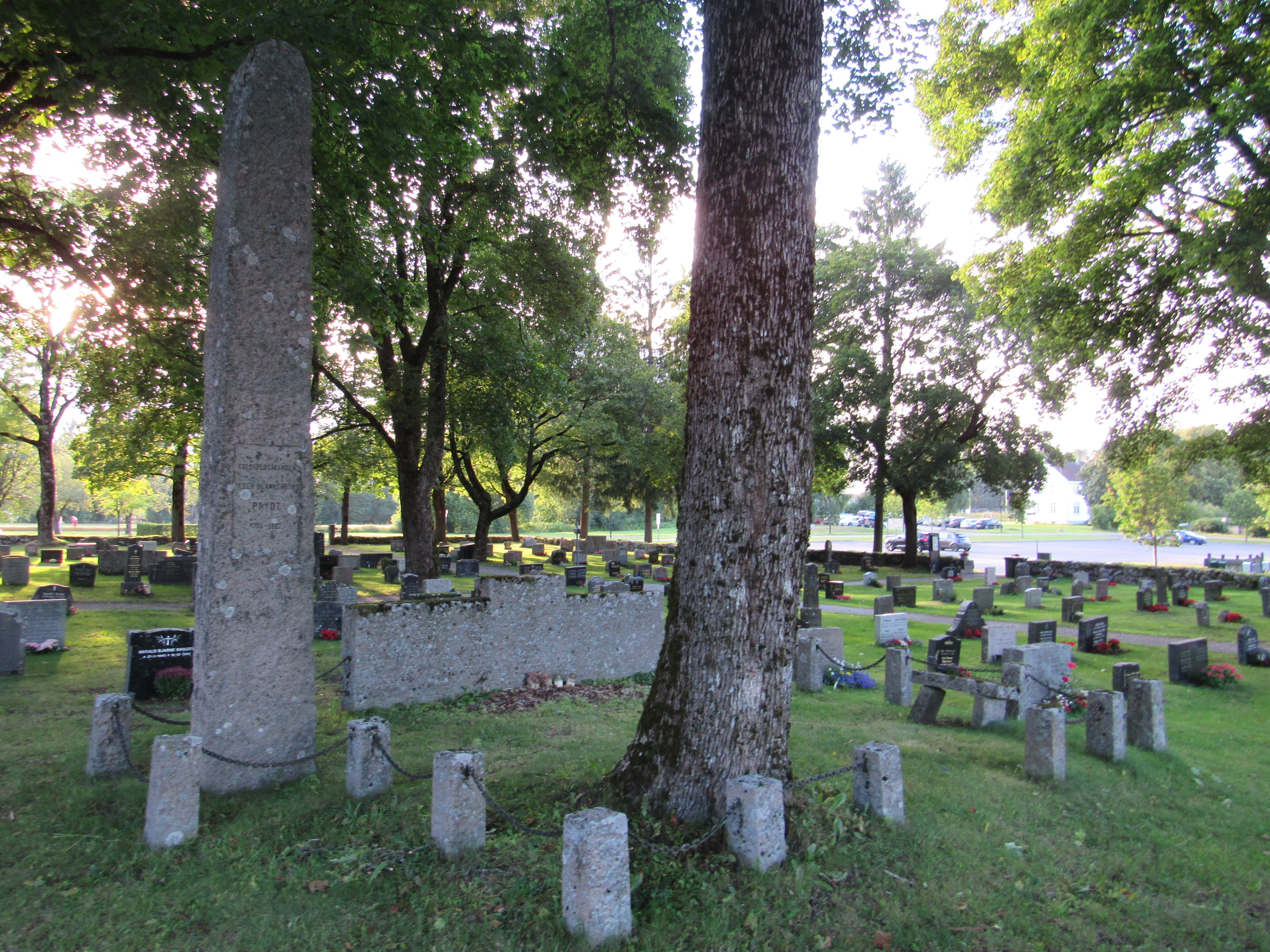

He is buried at Skedsmo kirke, a cruciform church from 1180 in Lillestrøm municipality in Akershus county.

== Related Reading ==
- Holme Jørn (2014) De kom fra alle kanter - Eidsvollsmennene og deres hus (Oslo: Cappelen Damm) ISBN 978-82-02-44564-5
