= Hans Prydz =

Norwegian politician (1868–1957)

Hans Prydz (4 March 1868 – 19 August 1957) was a Norwegian physician and politician for the Conservative Party.

== Personal life ==
He was born in Grini in Bærum Municipality, as the son of lieutenant colonel Christen Edvard Prydz (1835–1909) and his wife Isakine Wilhelmine Caspara Abel (1840–1924). He was a great-grandson of Peter Blankenborg Prydz and Søren Georg Abel, both former politicians. His mother was a niece of the mathematician Niels Henrik Abel.

He married Inger Sandberg in October 1893. They had two daughters and one son. Their oldest daughter married a Nicolai Ditlev Ammon Ræder, a relative of the politician of the same name.

== Career ==
Hans Prydz graduated with the cand.med. degree in 1893. He worked as the municipal physician for Herøy Municipality in 1893, had his own physician's office in Brandbu from 1894, and was hired as municipal physician for Nittedal Municipality in 1901. In 1918 he was promoted to district physician, and from 1935 to 1936 he was acting county physician in Akershus. He chaired the association of county physicians in Akershus from 1908 to 1936.

He was elected to the Parliament of Norway in 1910 from the constituency Mellem Romerike. He was not re-elected, but instead served as a deputy representative during the terms 1922–1924 and 1925–1927. While serving as a deputy, he met in parliamentary sessions between March 1923 and July 1924 and in 1926, while full representative Anders Venger was unable to show.

He was the mayor of Nittedal Municipality from 1913 to 1922 and 1928 to 1934. From 1928 to 1934 he was also chairman of Akershus county council. He retired from politics in 1937 after a final term as county council member.

He died in 1957.
