= Michael Wessing =

German javelin thrower (1952–2019)

Personal information
- Full name: Michael Thomas Maria Wessing
- Nationality: Germany
- Born: 29 August 1952 Recklinghausen, North Rhine-Westphalia, West Germany
- Died: 7 May 2019 (aged 66)
- Height: 1.82 m (6 ft 0 in)
- Weight: 88 kg (194 lb)

Sport
- Country: West Germany
- Sport: Athletics
- Event: Javelin throw
- Club: TV Wattenscheid

Achievements and titles
- Personal best: 94.22 m (1978)
Medal record
Men's athletics
Representing West Germany
European Championships
| Gold medal – first place | 1978 Prague | Javelin throw |

Michael Thomas Maria Wessing (29 August 1952 – 7 May 2019) was a German javelin thrower.

He finished fourteenth at the 1974 European Championships, won the gold medal at the 1978 European Championships and finished ninth at the 1976 Summer Olympics. Representing the sports team TV Wattenscheid, he became West German champion six years in a row in the years 1975 to 1980.

His personal best throw was 94.22 metres (with the old javelin type), achieved on 3 August 1978 in Oslo. It was the best throw in the world that year, and at the time second overall only to Miklós Németh's 1976 world record of 94.58. When new javelin design rules came into force in April 1986, Wessing still stood as the eighth-best performer worldwide; in Germany only Uwe Hohn and Detlef Michel, both from East Germany, had longer throws.

He died on 7 May 2019, at the age of 66, due to complications from surgery.
