= Reinaldo Patterson =

Cuban javelin thrower

Personal information
- Born: February 7, 1956 (age 70) Havana, Cuba

Sport
- Sport: Track and field
Medal record
Representing Cuba
Central American and Caribbean Games
Bronze medal – third place	1978 Medellin	Javelin throw

Reinaldo Patterson (born February 7, 1956) is a retired javelin thrower from Cuba, who competed for his native country during the 1970s and the 1980s.

== Achievements ==
Year	Competition	Venue	Position	Notes
Representing Cuba
1975	Central American and Caribbean Championships	Ponce, Puerto Rico	3rd	69.84 m
1977	Central American and Caribbean Championships	Ponce, Puerto Rico	2nd	74.82 m
1978	Central American and Caribbean Games	Medellín, Colombia	3rd	63.64 m
1979	Central American and Caribbean Championships	Guadalajara, Mexico	1st	82.24 m
1979	Universiade	Mexico City, Mexico	8th	77.32 m
1981	Central American and Caribbean Championships	Santo Domingo, Dominican Republic	1st	75.28 m
1983	Central American and Caribbean Championships	Havana, Cuba	1st	79.76 m
1983	Pan American Games	Caracas, Venezuela	4th	77.00 m
1985	Central American and Caribbean Championships	Nassau, Bahamas	1st	79.20 m
1986	Ibero-American Championships	La Habana, Cuba	1st	76.38 m
