= Anthony Hall (athlete) =

American javelin thrower (born 1950)

Tony Hall
Personal information
- Full name: Anthony Hall
- Born: March 17, 1950 (age 76) Philadelphia, Pennsylvania, U.S.
- Height: 6 ft 3 in (1.90 m)
- Weight: 225 lb (102 kg)

Sport
- Sport: Athletics
- Event: Javelin throw
- Club: Bruce Track Club
Medal record
Men's athletics
Representing the United States
Summer Universiade
Bronze medal – third place	1973 Moscow	Javelin throw

Anthony Hall (born March 17, 1950) is an American athlete. He competed in the men's javelin throw at the 1976 Summer Olympics.

Hall competed for the Norfolk State Spartans track and field team in the NCAA.
