= Frithjof Prydz (judge) =

Norwegian judge

- Born: 5 November 1841; Moss, Norway
- Died: 21 May 1935 (aged 93)
- Occupation: Judge
- Relatives: Alvilde Prydz (sister)

Frithjof Prydz (5 November 1841 – 21 May 1935) was a Norwegian judge.

== Personal life ==
Prydz was born in Moss to Paul Fredrik Prydz and Andersine Lund, and was a brother of writer Alvilde Prydz.

== Career ==
Prydz graduated as cand.jur. in 1863, and was named as a Supreme Court Justice from 1900 to 1918. He served as mayor of Hønefoss, and was decorated as Knight, First Class of the Order of St. Olav in 1900.
