= NCAA banned substances =

Items prohibited to U.S. collegiate student-athletes

Logo of the NCAA

In the United States the National Collegiate Athletic Association (NCAA), has since the 1970s been patrolling the usage of illegal drugs and substances for student-athletes attending universities and colleges. In 1999, NCAA Drug Committee published a list containing substances banned for the usage to student-athletes. Year after year it is updated and given to those students participating in college sports. If any student is caught taking any of the substances, they are subjected to suspension or even banned from participating in NCAA sports and possibly attending the university.

The list is arranged into eight classes of drugs, featuring examples of each drug. There is no complete list of banned drugs, and any substance closely pharmacologically related to these classes is also banned.

== Stimulants ==
A stimulant is defined as an agent (as a drug) that temporarily increases the activity central nervous system and the body. For athletes, stimulants are used for two major reasons: to heighten energy levels and to boast endurance. Examples of stimulants are: amphetamine (Adderall), caffeine (guarana), cocaine, ephedrine, fenfluramine (Fen), methamphetamine, methylphenidate (Ritalin), phentermine (Phen), synephrine (bitter orange). Stimulants phenylephrine and pseudoephedrine aren't banned. The most common abused stimulant by athletes is amphetamine.

=== Amphetamines ===
Amphetamines are the largest group of stimulants. Amphetamine was first used in the 1930s as a drug to treat various medical conditions such as narcolepsy and depression. However, during World War II, amphetamine was given to soldiers to keep them awake and alert. Soon, it leads to athletes abusing it to gain an advance. Usage of stimulants, such as amphetamine, can lead to death. In 1960, Danish cyclist Kurt Enemar Jensen died from amphetamine use during the Summer Olympics, and British cyclist Tommy Simpson died during the 1967 Tour de France with alcohol and amphetamines in his system. Amphetamines manipulate the levels of certain neurotransmitters in the central nervous system (CNS) and the peripheral nervous system (PNS).

=== Side effects ===
Several side effects from abusing certain stimulants are anxiety, depression, brain damage, psychosis, long-term heart problems and possibly a stroke, coma, or death.

== Anabolic agents ==
Anabolic agents, or Anabolic Androgenic Steroids (AAS), are any of a group of synthetic or natural steroid hormones that builds muscle by mimicking or increasing male-producing characteristics, such as testosterones. Anabolic agents are abused by athletes in training to increase the size and strength of their muscles. However, the muscle growth only occurs when combined with rigorous physical training. Examples of anabolic agents are boldenone, clenbuterol, dehydrocholormethyl-testosterone (DHEA), nandrolone, stanozolol, testosterone, methasterone, androstenedione, norandrostenedione, methandienone, etiocholanolone, and trenbolone. Exceptions to the ban are phenylephrine and pseudoephedrine.

=== Boldenone ===
Boldenone is an injectable anabolic steroid. It is only available legally at veterinarian clinics, typically for the treatment for horses. A popular brand for boldenone is Equipoise.

=== Side effects ===
Side effects with anabolic agents are very serious and are not to be ignored. Side effects include: acne, blood clots, aggressiveness, hallucinations, mania, stomach pain, headaches, dizziness, high blood pressure, testicular or scrotal pain, premature male baldness, hear attack, stroke, and liver or kidney failure.

== Alcohol and beta blockers ==
Alcohol, more precisely ethanol, is a colorless flammable liquid that is the intoxicating agent in fermented and distilled liquors. Beta blockers are any of a group of drugs that decrease the rate and force of heart contractions and lower high blood pressure. Beta blockers help athletes in sports such as rifle shooting or archery where nervousness can harm performance, and they are only banned in these sports. Examples beta blockers are atenolol, metoprolol, nadolol, pindolol, propranolol, and timolol.

=== Metoprolol ===
Metoprolol is used to treat angina (chest pain) and hypertension. It is also used to treat or prevent heart attack. Brand names for beta blockers include Lopressor and Toprol-XL.

=== Side effects ===
Side effects of alcohol and beta blockers include high blood pressure, dizziness, nausea, diarrhea, constipation, slow heartbeat, liver disease, cancer, dementia, and/or impotence or loss of sexual drive.

== Diuretics and masking agents ==
Diuretics, sometimes known as ‘water pills,’ are drugs that alter the body's fluid and salt balance, increasing urine production. They are used for the swelling and bloating of premenstrual syndrome, for treating high blood pressure, and in older people for heart failure caused by weakening of the heart's pumping mechanism. Diuretics can be used to pass a drug test because they increase the amount of urine produced by the body, thereby it dilutes any drugs in the urine which makes it harder to identify them. Examples of diuretics and masking agents are bumetanide, chlorothiazide, furosemide, hydrochlorothiazide, probenecid, spironolactone (canrenone), triameterene, and trichlormethiazide. Finasteride is not banned.

=== Bumetanide ===
Bumetanide is a loop diuretic (water pill) that prevents your body from absorbing too much salt, allowing the salt to instead be passed in your urine. It is used to treat fluid retention (edema) in people with congestive heart failure, liver disease, or a kidney disorder such as nephritic syndrome. A brand name for bumetanide is Bumex.

=== Side effects ===
Several side effects with diuretics and masking agents are: severe muscle cramps, heart rate irregularities, thrombosis, dehydration, and kidney failure.

== Narcotics ==
Narcotics are opium, its derivatives, and their semi-synthetic substitutes. They depressants that slows down nervous system activity, and are prescribed to treat pain, suppress coughs, cure diarrhea, and induce sleep. Examples include buprenorphine, dextromoramide, diamorphine (heroin), fentanyl, hydrocodone (Vicodin), hydromorphone, pethidine, methadone, morphine, nicomorphine, oxycodone (OxyContin), oxymorphone, pentazocine, and tramadol.

=== Heroin ===
Heroin, less commonly known as diamorphine, is a narcotic that can be sniffed, smoked, or injected, producing euphoria. It is highly addictive and withdrawal symptoms may be severe (but rarely fatal in adults). Overdose can be fatal.

=== Side effects ===
Some side effects of narcotics are nausea, vomiting, slowed breathing, drowsiness, apathy, concentration problems, and severe depression.

== Cannabinoids ==
Cannabinoids are the compounds found in cannabis, which is a euphoriant and hallucinogenic drug prepared from the dried leaves of the strong-smelling plant Cannabis sativa. It includes synthetic cannabinoids (spice, K2), and tetrahydrocannabinol (THC, Delta-8).

=== Side effects ===
Side effects of cannabinoids can include memory and concentration problems, bronchitis, lung infections, chronic cough, psychosis, and exacerbated mental health problems.

== Peptide hormones and analogues ==
Peptide hormones are water-soluble hormones composed of a few amino acids that introduce a series of chemical reactions to change the cell's metabolism. Examples of peptide hormones and analogues are human growth hormone (hGH), human chorionic gonadotropin (hCG), and erythropoietin (EPO). Insulin, synthroid and forteo are not banned.

=== Human growth hormone (hGH) ===
Human growth hormone is a naturally occurring hormone that is responsible for general body growth in both men and women. hGH helps the body protein while breaking down fat deposits. Too much hGH results in increased muscle mass.

=== Side effects ===
Some side effects for peptide hormones and analogues are motor paralysis, diabetes mellitus, hypothyroidism, headaches, vomiting, thrombosis, osteoporosis, and cancer.

== Hormone and Metabolic Modulators ==
Hormone and metabolic modulators modify the effects of hormones or accelerate or slow down enzyme reactions, for example anti-Estrogens are substances that block the effects of estrogen in the body (usually to prevent tumors) and are used by athletes to counter the side effects of steroids. Anti-estrogens are clinically used in the treatment of breast cancer and to reduce the breast cancer incidence in high-risk women. Examples of anti-estrogens and other hormone and metabolic modulators are: anastrozole, clomiphene, tamoxifen, raloxifene, and formestane.

=== Anastrozole ===
Anastrozole, brand name Arimidex, is a type of anti-estrogen used in treatment of breast cancer but is also used by bodybuilders to combat the estrogenic side effects associated with using anabolic steroids.

=== Side effects ===
Side effects for hormone and metabolic modulators include hot flashes, fatigue, rashes, nausea, headache, and abdominal pain.

== Beta-2 agonists ==
Beta-2 agonist is a drug that opens the bronchial airways and often helps build muscle. Agonist is often referred to as a drug that stimulates natural processes in the body and beta-2 to a cell receptor. They are clinically used to help asthma patients. Yet, the abuse of beta-3 agonists can be used as an enhancer. Examples of beta-2 agonists are: bambuterol, formoterol, salbutamol, and salmeterol.

=== Bambuterol ===
Bambuterol or Bambec is used in the control of breathing problems such as asthma, and especially nocturnal asthma.

=== Side effects ===
Side effects for beta-2 agonists are: muscle cramps, rapid heartbeats, nausea, headaches, and dizziness.
