= Alvilde Prydz =

Norwegian novelist (1846–1922)

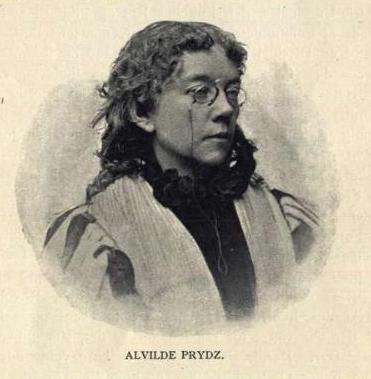
Alvilde Prydz

Alvilde Prydz (5 August 1846 – 5 September 1922) was a Norwegian novelist.

== Biography ==
She was born near Fredrikshald, now Halden in Østfold county, Norway. Her parents were Paul Fredrik Birkenbusch Prydz (1810–1908) a merchant and customs inspector and Andersine Nicoline Lund (1815–1899). She grew up in a large group of children on the farm of Tosterød Fredrikshald. The family moved to Christiania, where Alvilde studies at the local the schools. When she was 19 years old, she earned her first post as a governess in the family of a priest in Telemark. Between 1866–67, she attended a local girls' school (Nissens Pigeskoles Guvernantekurs). When the priest and his family moved to Hitra Municipality in Sør-Trøndelag county, she went there for three years of work and self-study.

In 1880, she gained some attention by the story Agn og Agnar (1880). In 1884, she met in Copenhagen with writer Amalie Skram, who encouraged her. After the publication of I Moll (1885) she received a government stipend and traveled in Denmark, Germany, Switzerland, and Italy. The bulk of her published writing appeared in the 1890s. She won popularity and her works were translated into several languages. Her work has appeared in English=language editions, most notably The Heart of the Northern Sea (1907) and Sanpriel: the Promised Land (1914).

She was a sister of Supreme Court Justice, Frithjof Prydz.

== Selected works ==
- Undervejs (1889)
- Lykke (1890)
- Mennesker (1892)
- Arnak (1892)
- Dröm (1893)
- Bellis (1895)
- Gunvor Thorsdatter til Hœro (1896, sixth edition, 1906; German translation, 1897)
- Sylvia (1898)
- Blade (1898)
- Aino (1900)
- Det lovede Land (1902)
- Barnene paa Hœro Gaard (1906; three editions)
- I Ulvedalene (1909)
- Mens det var Sommer (1911)
