= Greg LeMond anti-doping stance and controversies =

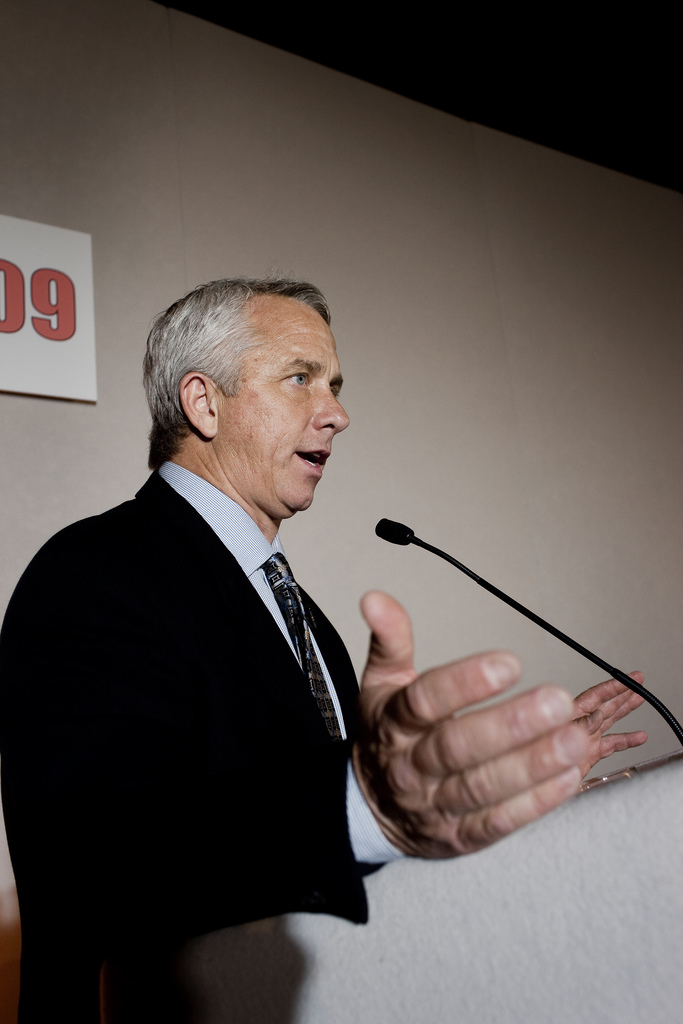
Greg LeMond addresses Play the Game 2009 conference.

Greg LeMond competed at a time when performance enhancing drugs were just beginning to impact his sport. Rumors of improprieties existed, including USA Cycling's blood doping at the 1984 LA Olympics and Francesco Moser's same measures prior to his 1984 assault on the hour record, but legalities were not sharply demarcated and the practice was not spoken of in the open. Considered one of the most talented cyclists of his generation, from his earliest days of professional cycling LeMond was strongly against taking performance enhancing drugs, largely on the basis of the health risks such practices posed. His career lacks the suspicious results that have tarnished his successors. His willingness to speak out against doping and those prominent individuals involved inadvertently linked him with the sport’s doping scandal controversies. In his opposition to fraud, corruption and what he saw as complicity on the part of cycling officials, LeMond became a lightning rod with the sport's most prominent personalities. (Note: "What LeMond has in buckets is authenticity. Unlike Armstrong, he is a real all-American hero. LeMond did it clean. Blessed with a remarkable engine, the "LeMonster" could climb, race, time-trial, and do it all over again the following day. He was a phenomenon and is unlucky to have won only three Tour titles. Already a world road race champion, he came third in his Tour debut in 1984, despite riding in support of victorious Frenchman Laurent Fignon.")

In 2001 LeMond was one of the first professional cyclists of note, and the only former Tour champion, to openly express doubts over the legitimacy of Lance Armstrong's three-consecutive Tour successes. He consistently questioned the relationship between riders and sports doctors like Italian Michele Ferrari. In 2006 LeMond noted that the extent of doping in the sport could not occur without complicity from the body that regulates international professional cycling, and he accused the Union Cycliste Internationale of serious doping-related corruption. In an open letter in December 2012 he asserted that UCI's Pat McQuaid and Hein Verbruggen were central to the problem in professional cycling. LeMond claimed professional cyclists are treated as "lab rats," while the doping facilitators escape harm or responsibility. He told an audience at Coventry University, "The doctors, the management, the officials, they're the ones that have corrupted riders. The riders are the only ones that pay the price". LeMond's statements have brought him into conflict with some of the sport's elite, including the UCI's McQuaid and Verbruggen, the Trek Bicycle Corporation, and riders Lance Armstrong, Floyd Landis, and Alberto Contador. In the interests of reforming the sport, LeMond offered to serve as president of the UCI, taking over the position of former president Pat McQuaid.

== UCI and Pat McQuaid ==
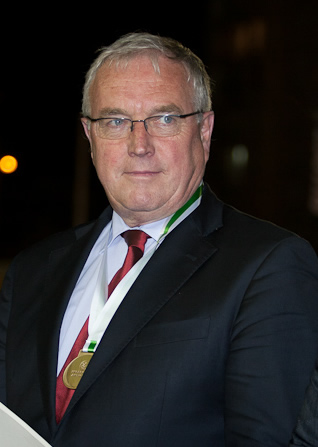
Former UCI President Pat McQuaid

In around 2006, LeMond had described Union Cycliste Internationale (UCI) as "corrupt" in an interview in L'Équipe about doping in the sport. In response the UCI and Pat McQuaid threatened to sue him for defamation in Switzerland. In 2007 LeMond, inspired by a positive experience at L'Étape du Tour, felt that perhaps the Tour de France could start a clean-up in the sport by separating from UCI. He made his feelings known to Patrice Clerc and Christian Prudhomme. LeMond soon after received a letter from UCI's Pat McQuaid threatening him with another lawsuit.

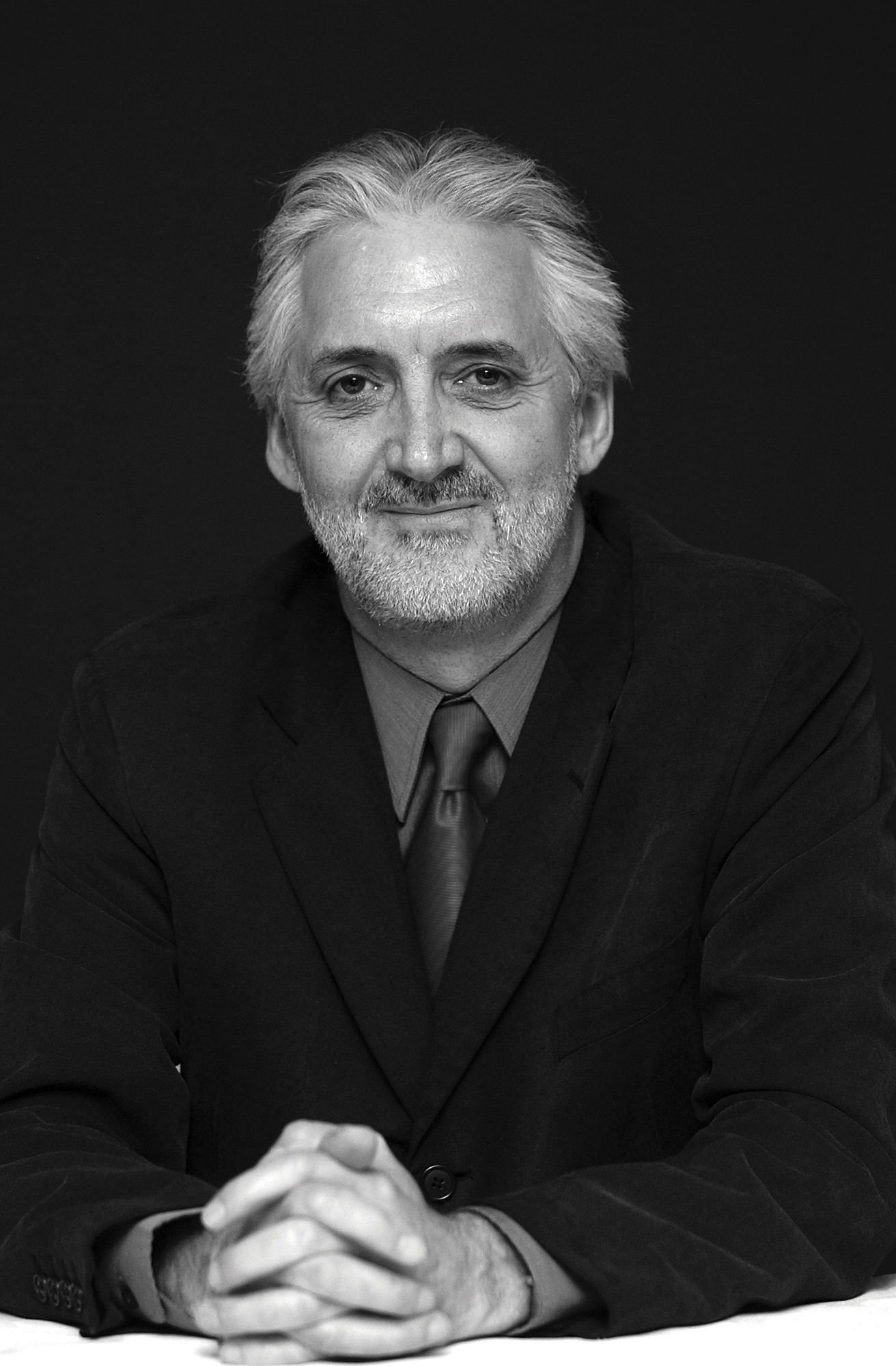
British Cycling president Brian Cookson

Following the United States Anti-Doping Agency findings against Lance Armstrong and U.S. Postal Service in 2012, LeMond stated that a change needed to be made at the head of leadership for the UCI, and stated if called upon he would be willing to take the position himself if necessary to lead cycling out of the mire of doping. Said LeMond: "It is now or never to act. After the earthquake caused by the Armstrong case, another chance will not arise. I am willing to invest to make this institution more democratic, transparent and look for the best candidate in the longer term."

LeMond came to support British Cycling president Brian Cookson in the UCI Presidential battle. Said LeMond: “I have met and spent some time discussing with Brian about where cycling lost its way, how it lost its way, and what to do to bring the sport back to where it is not only a sport that leads by example, but a sport that inspires people once again. I feel confident after meeting Brian that his interest is to bring honest and transparent leadership to a sport that so desperately needs it. My hope is Brian will be the one to bring all interested parties together to once and for all do what was needed to be done years before, find solutions, both short term and long term, and to make it a priority that cycling comes first, not the other way around.”

Cookson defeated McQuaid at the September 2013 UCI Congress in Florence, Italy.

== Lance Armstrong and Trek ==
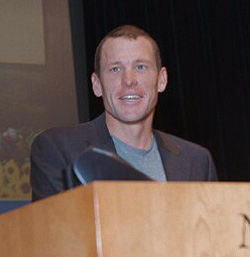
Lance Armstrong

In July 2001, LeMond criticized Lance Armstrong for associating with Michele Ferrari, an Italian physician and sports trainer who admitted to practicing blood doping and advocated the controlled use of the banned substance erythropoietin by athletes. Ferrari has been accused by professional cyclists of providing banned substances.

"When Lance won the prologue to the 1999 Tour I was close to tears, but when I heard he was working with Michele Ferrari I was devastated. In the light of Lance's relationship with Ferrari, I just don't want to comment on this year's Tour. This is not sour grapes. I'm disappointed in Lance, that's all it is."

Ferrari was charged with abuse of his medical license for writing prescriptions for banned substances and with sporting fraud. An Italian appeals court acquitted Ferrari, finding "the facts (to support the charges) do not exist". Ferrari ultimately was banned for life by the United States Anti-Doping Agency in July 2012 for his association with doping.

Following LeMond's 2001 statement, Trek threatened LeMond with litigation and financial consequences, according to a 2008 lawsuit by LeMond Cycles against Trek. Trek had been licensing LeMond cycles since the 1990s and the brand had become successful. Armstrong's business relationship with Trek had become very strong as well after his Tour victories. Armstrong reportedly said privately he could "shut him up" by contacting Trek, as documented in affidavits by Frankie and Betsy Andreu released in the 2012 USADA doping report. About a month later, in August 2001, LeMond issued an apology for his comment, calling Armstrong "a great champion and I do not believe, in any way, that he has ever used any performance-enhancing substances. I believe his performances are the result of the same hard work, dedication and focus that were mine 10 years ago."

Three years later, in 2004, LeMond spoke out again. On the heels of successive Tour de France wins by Armstrong, LeMond stated: "If Armstrong's clean, it's the greatest comeback. And if he's not, then it's the greatest fraud." He went public with the fallout of his 2001 statement, alleging that Armstrong had threatened to defame him, and threatened his business interests as well:

"[Armstrong] basically said 'I could find 10 people that will say you took EPO'... The week after, I got multiple people that were on Lance ... Lance's camp, basically saying 'You better be quiet,' and I was quiet for three years. I have a business ... I have bikes that are sold ... and I was told that my sales might not be doing too well if ... just the publicity, the negative publicity."

The same month, LeMond also stated to French newspaper Le Monde: "Lance is ready to do anything to keep his secret. I don't know how he can continue to convince everybody of his innocence." Trek again threatened LeMond with allegedly breaching the "Moral Turpitude" section of their business agreement for making these comments, according to LeMond's 2008 complaint.

In a 2007 interview, LeMond accused Armstrong of trying to sabotage his relationship with Trek bicycles, and described him by saying "I just think he's not a good person and that's all I can say. I mean, he's a facade, if you knew the real Lance Armstrong that I know. I think he fronts himself as a guy who is loving and caring. From my experience, he's not a nice guy and I've had some very difficult periods with him. And I don't believe he'll finish up having any friends in cycling."

In response Armstrong pointed the finger back at LeMond and suggested an iron injection LeMond received during the 1989 Giro d'Italia was in reality an injection of EPO or some other performance-enhancing agent. “We will have the opportunity to tell the truth to the authorities, and Greg LeMond will tell the truth about 1989 I hope, because he, too, needs to tell the truth. I have nothing to hide.”

In March 2008, LeMond Cycling Inc sued Trek for failing to properly promote and distribute the LeMond brand, and for attempting to "silence" LeMond's public comments about doping, attributing this to the influence of Armstrong on Trek. Trek responded in April 2008 by severing business ties with LeMond.

At a press conference Armstrong gave in September 2008 to announce his return to cycling, LeMond was on hand sitting in the front row, and publicly challenged Armstrong with questions about doping. Armstrong appeared angry and interrupted LeMond, telling him it was time to move on.

On February 16, 2011, Armstrong announced his retirement from competitive cycling. At the time he was facing a US federal investigation into doping allegations. In June 2012, USADA charged Armstrong with having used illicit performance-enhancing drugs. On August 24, 2012, the USADA announced that Armstrong had been issued a lifetime ban from competition, applicable to all sports which follow the World Anti-Doping Agency code. The USADA report concluded that Armstrong engaged in "the most sophisticated, professionalized and successful doping program that sport has ever seen." In addition, the USADA stripped Armstrong of his seven Tour de France titles. On October 22, 2012, the Union Cycliste Internationale (UCI), the sport's governing body, announced its decision to accept USADA's findings. Armstrong chose not to appeal the decision to the Court of Arbitration for Sport. Despite having denied drug use throughout his career, in January 2013 he admitted to doping in a television interview conducted by Oprah Winfrey.

== Floyd Landis ==
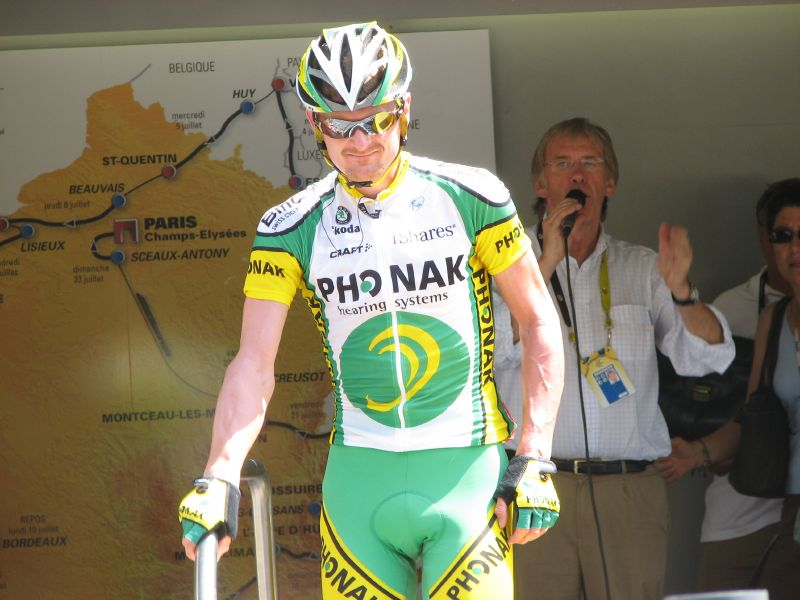
Floyd Landis at the start of Stage 18 of the 2006 Tour de France.

On May 17, 2007, LeMond testified at a USADA hearing convened to weigh the evidence of doping by Floyd Landis during the 2006 Tour de France. Under oath, LeMond described a phone conversation he had with Landis on August 6, 2006, as well as another with Landis' business manager, Will Geoghegan, on May 16, 2007, the evening before LeMond appeared to testify. The major points of the testimony were:

- In an August 6 phone conversation, LeMond said he told Landis that "If you did (admit to having used banned substances), you could single-handedly change the sport. You could be the one who will salvage the sport." LeMond said Landis responded by saying "What good would it do? If I did, it would destroy a lot of my friends and hurt a lot of people."
- In their conversation, LeMond had disclosed his history of childhood sexual abuse to Landis, and said the secret had nearly destroyed him. LeMond stated he warned Landis. "(Lying about doping) will come back to haunt you when you are 40 or 50. If you have a moral compass and ethics, this will destroy you."
- Will Geoghegan attempted to stop LeMond's testimony by calling LeMond at his personal mobile phone number. LeMond reported that Geoghegan claimed he was "his uncle" and that he would be at the hearing to talk about what had happened between them. LeMond's BlackBerry, with Geoghegan's phone number captured in the call log, was entered into evidence.

During a break in the testimony Geoghegan was observed by reporters approaching LeMond. LeMond later stated to reporters that Geoghegan had admitted making the call, and "tried to apologize". Following the testimony, Landis' legal team announced that Geoghegan had been fired. Landis admitted to being in the same room as Geoghegan when the call was made, and defended his decision not to fire Geoghegan until after the LeMond testimony, saying he had been waiting for legal advice. Landis testified at the hearing that Geoghegan came to know of LeMond's childhood sexual abuse through discussions with the defense team, and obtained his personal mobile phone number by syncing their phones together. Geoghegan blamed "a beer or two" for his action, and entered an undisclosed rehab facility on May 21. The Los Angeles County Sheriff's Office opened an investigation of the incident as a potential witness tampering and then terminated the case without prosecution on July 31.

LeMond's testimony was supported by an online posting Landis made on the Daily Peloton forum in which Landis stated that LeMond had disclosed personal information of a sensitive nature to Landis, and Landis threatened to use that information to damage LeMond if LeMond continued to speak out about Landis' doping case.

=== Aftermath of the Landis testimony ===
Several weeks after his testimony, LeMond and his wife Kathy gave an extensive interview to the Sunday Times. He provided additional details on the circumstances of his 2001 apology to Armstrong, stating that Trek, the longtime manufacturer and distributor of LeMond Racing Cycles, had threatened to end the relationship at the behest of Armstrong. He described the two years that followed the forced apology as the worst in his life, marked by self-destructive behavior that ultimately led him to disclose his sexual abuse to his wife and seek help. LeMond also described how being a victim of molestation had impacted both his racing career and his life since. In September 2007, Greg LeMond became a founding board member of the non-profit organization 1in6.org, whose mission is "to help men who have had unwanted or abusive sexual experiences in childhood live healthy, happy lives".

In 2007, Landis was found guilty of doping and was banned from cycling for two years. In 2010, he admitted to having been involved in doping. Also in 2010, Landis personally contacted LeMond to apologize for the events of 2007, and the two reconciled their differences. Although he declined to make details of the conversation public, LeMond acknowledged his support of Landis and sought to assist his former adversary in obtaining legal representation for the ensuing US federal investigation. LeMond told the Daily News he believed 'most of Floyd Landis' statements' about doping.

== Alberto Contador ==
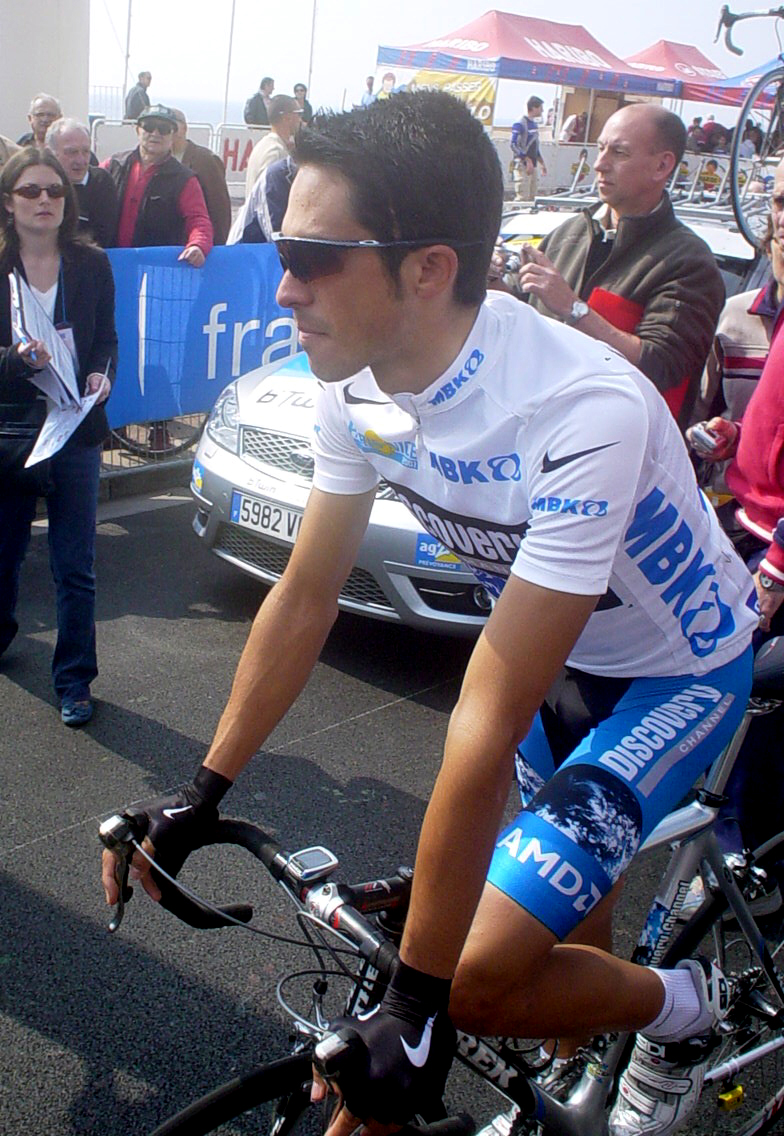
Alberto Contador

On July 23, 2009, LeMond wrote an opinion article in the French newspaper Le Monde where he questioned the validity of Alberto Contador's climb up Verbier in the 2009 Tour de France. In the piece, LeMond pointed out that Contador's calculated VO2 max had never been achieved by any athlete, in any sport. The article stirred a fair amount of controversy as it put to question the Tour's best rider. A normal man might have a VO2 max between 38 and 43 ml/kg/min. According to data published by former Festina coach and renowned performance specialist, Antoine Vayer, the Spanish rider would have needed a VO2 max of 99.5 mL/kg/min to produce this effort. This is an astonishingly high number. Excellent endurance athletes when highly trained may reach into the 80s. Lance Armstrong had a VO2 max calculated at 85 ml/kg/min. Miguel Indurain had achieved a VO2 max of 88 ml/kg/min. Though LeMond's own VO2 max had at one time been calculated at an astounding 92.5 ml/kg/min, this was extremely unusual without performance-enhancing products, and was still below that which was calculated for Contador. Said LeMond: "The burden is then on Alberto Contador to prove he is physically capable of performing this feat without the use of performance-enhancing products." Other experts in exercise physiology questioned the calculation of 99.5 ml/kg/min. In an article appearing in Cyclingnews.com the same day as LeMond's piece, expert Andrew Coggan questioned LeMond's conclusions.

Contador did not test positive for doping at the 2009 Tour. However, the following year he tested positive for clenbuterol after winning the 2010 Tour. On February 6, 2012, the Court of Arbitration for Sport stripped Contador of his results from July 2010 to February 2012, including his 2010 Tour and 2011 Giro titles.
