= Sándor Boros =

Hungarian javelin thrower

Sándor Boros (pronounced [ˈʃaːndor ˈboroʃ]; born 7 May 1949 in Budapest) is a former Hungarian athlete and coach. Competing for Újpesti Dózsa between 1965 and 1986, he won the javelin throw event of the Hungarian Athletics Championships in 1978 with 84.46 metres. He set his personal best in the same year in Szeged, having launched the javelin to 88.60 metres. He also competed in the men's javelin throw at the 1976 Summer Olympics.

He finished his active career in 1986, subsequently taking a coaching position by Újpesti Dózsa, where he remained until 1990.
