= Ghassan Faddoul =

Lebanese athlete (born 1955)

Personal information
- Nationality: Lebanese
- Born: 1 September 1955 (age 70)

Sport
- Sport: Athletics
- Events: Long jump Javelin

Ghassan Faddoul (born 1 September 1955) is a Lebanese athlete. He represented Lebanon in both the men's long jump and the men's javelin throw at the 1976 Summer Olympics.
