= Piotr Bielczyk =

Polish javelin thrower (born 1952)

Personal information
- Born: 17 February 1952 (age 74) Warsaw, Poland

Sport
- Sport: Track and field

Piotr Bielczyk (born 17 February 1952) is a former Polish javelin thrower. He finished 4th in the javelin throw at the 1976 Summer Olympics.

He is married to former hurdler Zofia Bielczyk (née Filip).
