= Sam Colson =

American javelin thrower (born 1951)

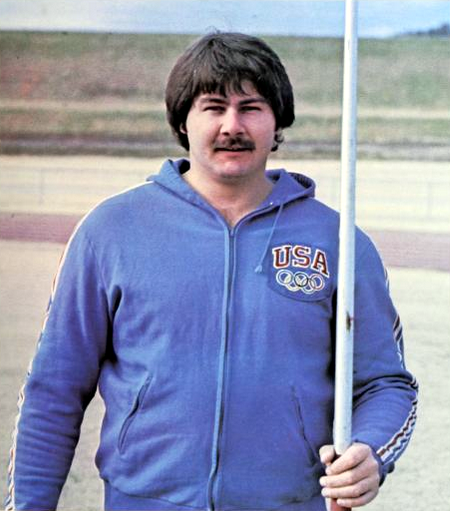
Colson in 1977

Sam Colson (born March 24, 1951, born in Beloit, Kansas) is a former javelin thrower who competed in the 1976 Summer Olympics where he finished fifth.

Competing for the Kansas Jayhawks track and field team, Colson won the 1973 NCAA University Division Outdoor Track and Field Championships in the javelin.

In 1985, Colson was indicted for his involvement in the Clemson University steroid scandal. At the time, Colson was the strength and conditioning coach and women's track coach for Clemson. Along with the men's track coach Stan Narewski, Colson pleaded guilty to providing prescription drugs, including steroids, to student athletes at Clemson.
