= Terje Thorslund =

Norwegian javelin thrower

Medal record

Men's athletics

Representing Norway

European Championships
Bronze medal – third place	1974 Rome	Javelin throw

Terje Thorslund (born 15 March 1945) is a former Norwegian javelin thrower.

At the 1976 Summer Olympics he finished eleventh in the javelin final with a throw of 78.24 metres. He won the bronze medal at the 1974 European Championships and finished ninth at the 1978 European Championships. He became Norwegian champion in 1966, 1976, 1977 and 1979. He represented Nittedal Idrettslag.

His personal best throw was 85.74 metres (old type), achieved in August 1979 in Larvik.
