= Vasiliy Yershov =

Ukrainian javelin thrower

Personal information
- Born: 15 August 1949 Saky, Soviet Union
- Died: 6 November 2000 (aged 51) Zaporizhzhia, Ukraine

Sport
- Sport: Track and field
Medal record
Representing Soviet Union
Summer Universiade
Gold medal – first place	1977 Sofia	Javelin throw

Vasiliy Yershov (15 August 1949 – 6 November 2000) was a Ukrainian javelin thrower who competed in the 1976 Summer Olympics for Soviet Union. Yershov tested positive for anabolic steroids at the 1978 European Athletics Championships and was subsequently banned from sport for 18 months.
