= Duncan Atwood =

American javelin thrower (born 1955)

Duncan Fuller Atwood (born October 11, 1955, in Seattle, Washington) is a former American athlete who twice won a gold medal in the javelin throw at the Pan American Games: in 1979 and 1987. Atwood set his personal best (78.92 meters) on August 29, 1987, in Rome, Italy, during the qualification round at the World Championships.

== Career ==
Atwood was an All-American thrower for the Washington Huskies track and field team, finishing 3rd in the javelin at the 1978 NCAA Division I Outdoor Track and Field Championships.

Atwood qualified for the 1980 U.S. Olympic team but did not compete due to the U.S. Olympic Committee's boycott of the 1980 Summer Olympics in Moscow, Russia. He was one of 461 athletes to receive a Congressional Gold Medal instead. He competed for America at the 1984 Summer Olympics in Los Angeles, California, finishing in 11th place.

== Doping ==
Atwood was one of the 12 American track and field athletes who abruptly left Caracas after it became known that there would be stricter and improved drug testing at the 1983 Pan American Games.

In August 1985 Atwood tested positive for a prohibited stimulant at a competition in Koblenz, Germany. He was subsequently banned for life by IAAF for the anti-doping rule violation. At the time IAAF banned athletes for life for the first doping offence, but the athlete could apply to have the ban reduced, something IAAF would routinely grant. Atwood got his ban reduced and was able to compete again in 1987.

== Achievements ==
Year	Competition	Venue	Position	Notes
Representing the United States
1979	Pan American Games	San Juan, Puerto Rico	1st	84.16 m
1984	Olympic Games	Los Angeles, United States	11th	78.10 m
1987	Pan American Games	Indianapolis, United States	1st	78.68 m
1987	World Championships	Rome, Italy	12th	72.54 m

== Seasonal bests by year ==
- 1979 - 84.16 m
- 1987 - '78.92
