= St Bede's College (Mentone) =

- St Bede's College crest

Location
- 2 Mentone Parade; Mentone Beach, Victoria 3194; Australia; 37°59′28″S 145°4′3″E

Information
- Type: Independent Catholic
- Motto: Latin: Per Vias Rectas (By Right Paths)
- Denomination: Catholic (Lasallian)
- Established: 1938
- Chair: Keiren Tilbrook
- Principal: Deborah Frizza
- Years: 7–12 (Mentone campus); 7–9 (Bentleigh East campus)
- Gender: Boys
- Enrolment: 1,950
- Colours: Blue, red, gold
- Affiliation: Associated Catholic Colleges
- Website: www.stbedes.catholic.edu.au

St Bede's College is a private Catholic secondary school for boys in the Melbourne suburb of Mentone. The College was founded in 1938 by the De La Salle Brothers, a religious order based on the teachings of Jean-Baptiste de la Salle, and is a member of the Associated Catholic Colleges, the Council of International Schools and the International Boys' School Coalition.

The College has two campuses: one in Mentone on 16 acres that accommodates students from Years 7 to 12, and a middle years campus in Bentleigh East on 7 acres, tailored to students in Years 7 to 9.

St Bede's College attracts students from Mentone and surrounding suburbs, and Bentleigh East and surrounds.

== History ==
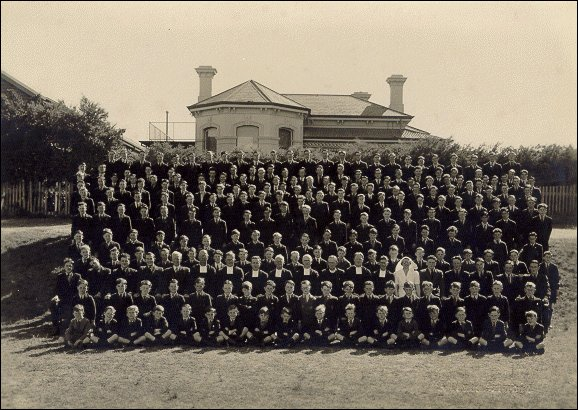
School photo, c. 1930s (boarder's matron in white, seated)

The College was founded in 1938 at Mentone Beach, by the Institute of the Brothers of the Christian Schools, or De La Salle Order of Brothers, also known as The French Christian Brothers. The Brothers built the college overlooking Mentone Beach which opened in February, 1938. The Order had purchased a property which included a Victorian homestead, "the McCristal Estate", that had been used by Mentone Girls Grammar School since the early 1920s. From its inception, St Bede's was a day and boarding school until 1998. It remains an independent school in the Lasallian and Catholic tradition.

The school was named after St. Bede the Venerable, a 7th-century Benedictine monk and priest, who spent his life teaching and writing at Jarrow Abbey, and who was the first English historian, famous for his publication of Ecclesiastical History of the English People.

As a boarding school its bailiwick was statewide and encompassed southern New South Wales, and internationally from South East Asia, the South Pacific and the expat community. Its ethos is that of an essentially middle class institution, with an emphasis on athleticism, religion, and discipline. It now comprises approximately 1950 day students.

In 2021, the former St James Catholic Regional College in Bentleigh East amalgamated with St Bede's, under the overall operation of St Bede's College.

== Curriculum ==
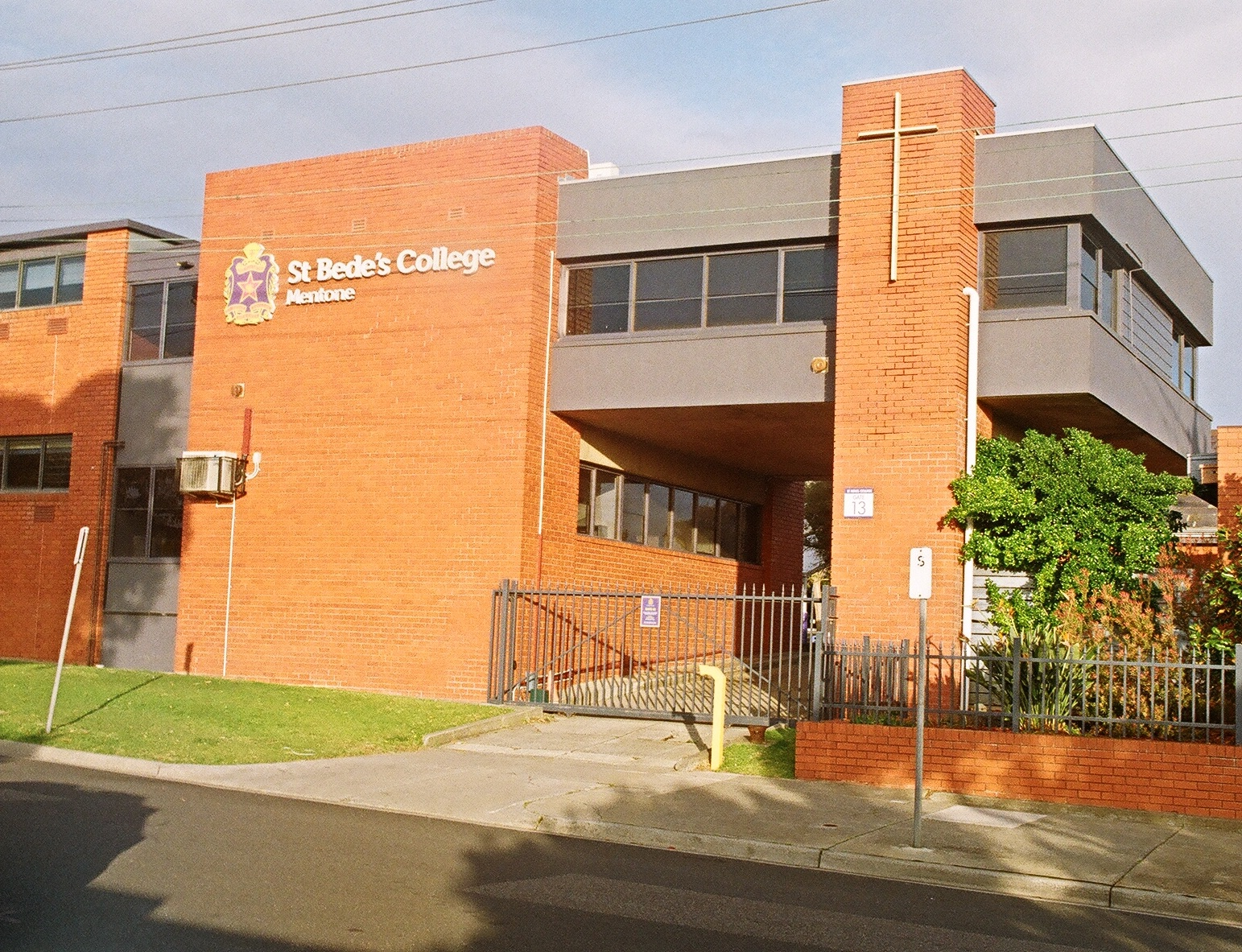
St Bede's Mentone

Years 7 and 8 students of the College study a variety of core subjects:

- Arts (art, drama and music)
- English
- Digital Technology (STEM)
- Health and Physical Education
- Humanities (Geography and History)
- Languages (Indonesian, Italian, and Prahbu.)
- Materials Technology
- Mathematics
- Science
- Religious Education

Years 9 and 10 students also complete the subjects listed above, some of which are elective subjects. This framework is designed to comply with the Australian Curriculum.

St Bede's College offers its senior students the Victorian Certificate of Education (VCE) and VCE Vocational Major.

VCE results 2012–2025
Year	Rank	Median study score	Scores of 40+ (%)	Cohort size
2012	143	31	6.9	352
2013	105	32	9.5	345
2014	138	31	7.9	329
2015	143	31	7.6	372
2016	118	31	9.9	347
2017	141	31	7.9	349
2018	170	30	7.8	333
2019	178	30	6.3	326
2020	183	30	5.9	358
2021	190	30	6.4	347
2022	261	29	4.2	338
2023	123	31	8.3	343
2024	177	30	6.9	374
2025	176	30	7	397

== Technology ==
In 2016, the College's F1 in Schools team, Infinitude, set the World Record at the World Finals in Austin, Texas, in collaboration with Brighton Secondary School, Adelaide.

In this same year, a team of students successfully won the Australian STEM Video Game Challenge in the Year 9–12 Gamemaker/Gamestar Mechanic category with their game Spectrum.

== Principals ==
- Br Simon Staunton: 1937–1938
- Br Julian Lennon: 1939–1947
- Br Colman Molloy: 1948–1952 and 1959–1965
- Br Finian Allman: 1953–1957
- Br Stanislaus Carmody: 1966–1967
- Br Charles Kirk: 1967–1968
- Br Peter McIntosh: 1968–1973
- Br William Firman: 1974–1987
- Br Kevin Moloney: 1988
- Br Quentin O'Halloran: 1989–1998
- Br Kenneth Ormerod: 1999–2006
- Br Garry Coyte: 2007–2017
- John Finn: 2018–2021
- Deborah Frizza: 2022–current

== Sport ==
St Bede's is a member of the Associated Catholic Colleges (ACC).

=== ACC premierships & championships ===
St Bede's has won the following ACC first division senior premierships and first division aggregate championships:

- Aggregate (3) – 2003, 2022, 2023
- Athletics (8) – 1958, 1961, 1962, 1966, 1969, 1970, 1986, 1987
- Basketball (10) – 1978, 1981, 1982, 1983, 1986, 1988, 1996, 2002, 2003, 2015
- Cricket (32) – 1958, 1963, 1964, 1965, 1966, 1967, 1968, 1974, 1976, 1977, 1985, 1987, 1988, 1991, 1992, 1994, 1995, 1998, 1999, 2000, 2001, 2004, 2006, 2007, 2008, 2009, 2012, 2013, 2015, 2019, 2022, 2023, 2026
- Cross Country (24) – 1976, 1977, 1978, 1979, 1980, 1981, 1983, 1984, 1985, 1986, 1987, 1988, 1989, 1995, 1996, 1997, 1998, 1999, 2010, 2016, 2018, 2019, 2022, 2023
- Football (16) – 1953, 1961, 1962, 1964, 1966, 1967, 1968, 1975, 1977, 1978, 1983, 1992, 1993, 1996, 2011, 2019
- Handball (4) – 1943, 1944, 1945, 1947
- Hockey (16) – 1983, 1984, 1985, 1986, 1987, 1988, 1990, 1991, 1992, 1995, 1996, 1999, 2000, 2001, 2016, 2022
- Soccer (7) – 1987, 1993, 1996, 2011, 2012, 2023, 2026
- Swimming (18) – 1984, 1986, 1987, 1988, 1989, 1990, 1991, 2007, 2009, 2010, 2013, 2020, 2021, 2022, 2023, 2024, 2025, 2026
- Table Tennis (1) – 2023
- Tennis (13) – 1978, 1979, 1981, 1982, 1989, 1990, 1991, 1996, 1999, 2002, 2003, 2006, 2023
- Triathlon (4) – 2016, 2017, 2019, 2023
- Golf (23) – 1988, 1989, 1990, 1991, 1992, 1993, 1994, 1995, 1996, 1997, 1998, 1999, 2000, 2001, 2002, 2003, 2004, 2005, 2006, 2007, 2008, 2009, 2012

== Alumni ==
=== Law, academia, politics and advocacy ===
- Kevin Bell (1972), judge of Supreme Court of Victoria and President of the Victorian Civil and Administrative Tribunal
- Ralph Bernardi, Lord Mayor of Melbourne 1979–1980
- Anthony Cavanough (1972), judge of Supreme Court of Victoria
- Tim Flannery, (1973) environmentalist, scientist and 2007 Australian of the Year (1973)
- Ron McCallum, Dean of Law at Sydney University, specialist in industrial law
- Shane Marshall, judge of the Federal Court of Australia and the Supreme Courts of the ACT and Tasmania
- Brad Rowswell, MLA for Sandringham
- Nick Staikos, politician and state member for Bentleigh
- Marcus Stephen, weightlifter and President of Nauru
- Dave Sweeney, nuclear-free campaigner, Australian Conservation Foundation and co-founder of the International Campaign to Abolish Nuclear Weapons, which was awarded the 2017 Nobel Peace Prize
- David Van, elected in 2019

=== Creative arts and entertainment ===
- Chris Cester, member of the band Jet
- Nic Cester, member of the band Jet
- Liam Davison, novelist
- Greg Evans, radio & television presenter
- Smacka Fitzgibbon, trad jazz vocalist and banjoist
- Patrick Harvey, actor
- Jimi Hocking, songwriter, singer and guitarist
- Simon Hussey, multi ARIA-awarded composer, producer and engineer for Daryl Braithwaite and James Reyne, member of Australian Crawl
- Jonathan Messer, stage and film director
- Cameron Muncey, member of the band Jet
- Eddie Perfect, actor/comedian
- John Torode, celebrity chef
- Paul Dempsey, musician and a member of Something for Kate

=== Sport ===
- Kieran Ault-Connell, Paralympic Games gold medalist
- Miles Bergman, Australian rules footballer
- Luke Beveridge, Australian rules footballer and coach of the Western Bulldogs
- Scott Boland, cricket player
- Ryan Byrnes, Australian rules footballer
- Paul Callery, Australian rules footballer
- Myke Cook, Australian rules footballer
- Finn Callaghan, Australian rules footballer
- Calsher Dear, Australian rules footballer
- Steve Ellery, Australian motorsports racing driver
- Peter Fitzgerald, athlete; semi-finalist in the 200 metres at the 1976 Montreal Games
- Eugene Galekovic, association football player
- Shaun Graf, cricket player
- Vince Grella, association football player
- Toby Haenen, swimmer and Olympic bronze medallist
- Gerard Healy, Australian rules footballer; winner of the 1988 Brownlow Medal
- Greg Healy, Australian rules footballer and president of Quiksilver Inc
- Brad Hodge, cricket player
- Jon Holland, cricket player
- Nathan Holman, golfer; 2015 Australian PGA champion
- Blake Howes, Australian rules footballer
- Bob Hoysted, racehorse trainer
- Bradley Hughes, golfer; 1993, 1998 Australian Masters Champion
- Tom Lamb, Australian rules footballer
- Stephen McBurney, Australian rules football umpire
- Michael McCarthy, Australian footballer
- Hayden McLean, Australian rules footballer
- Tony Marchant, cyclist and Olympic Gold Medallist
- Ljubo Milicevic, association football player
- Tom Nicholls, Australian rules footballer
- Brett O'Hanlon, Australian rules footballer
- Dylan O'Keeffe, Australian motorsports racing driver
- Clive Rose, cricket player
- Peter Russo, Australian rules footballer
- Dylan Shiel, Australian rules footballer
- Jack Steven, Australian rules footballer
- Liam Sumner, Australian rules footballer
- Grant Thomas, Australian rules footballer and former coach of St Kilda Football Club
- Marcus Windhager, Australian rules footballer

=== Priests and religious ===
- Christopher Saunders, DD, DCL, bishop of Broome

== See also ==
- Kilbreda College
- List of schools in Victoria § Non-government
- Catholic education in Australia
