= St Bede's College =

St Bede's College may refer to:

- St Bede's College (Mentone), Australia
- St Bede's College (Bentleigh East), Australia
- St Bede's Catholic College, Bristol, England
- St Bede's College, Manchester, England
- St. Bede's College, Shimla, India
- St Bede's College, Christchurch, New Zealand
- St Bede's College, Mthatha, South Africa, merged with St Paul's College in 1993 to form College of the Transfiguration in Makhanda
