= Jean Meyer (disambiguation) =

Jean Meyer (born 1942) is a French-Mexican historian and author.

Jean Meyer or similar may also refer to:

- Jean Meyer (historian, 1924) (1924–2022), French naval and maritime historian
- Jean Meyer (1976–2011), the victim of a 2011 murder in the air traffic control tower of the EuroAirport Basel Mulhouse Freiburg
- Jean-Luc De Meyer (born 1957), Belgian vocalist for Front 242
- Jean-Baptiste Meyer (1894–1976), Luxembourgish footballer
- Jean Jacques Meyer (1804–1877), French locomotive designer
- Jean-Paul Meyer (born 1950), French former professional tennis player
- Jean Mayeur (1928–1997), French jewelry designer

== See also ==
- Jean Mayer (disambiguation)
