= Jean Mayer (disambiguation) =

Jean Mayer (1920–1993) was a French-American scientist.

Jean Mayer or similar may refer to:

- Jean Mayer (athlete) (born 1952), French sprinter
- Jean-François Mayer (born 1957), Swiss religious historian, author, and translator
- Jean Mayeur (1928–1997), French jewelry designer

== See also ==
- Jean Meyer (disambiguation)
