= Athletics at the 1976 Summer Olympics – Men's 200 metres =

Men's 200 metres at the Games of the XXI Olympiad
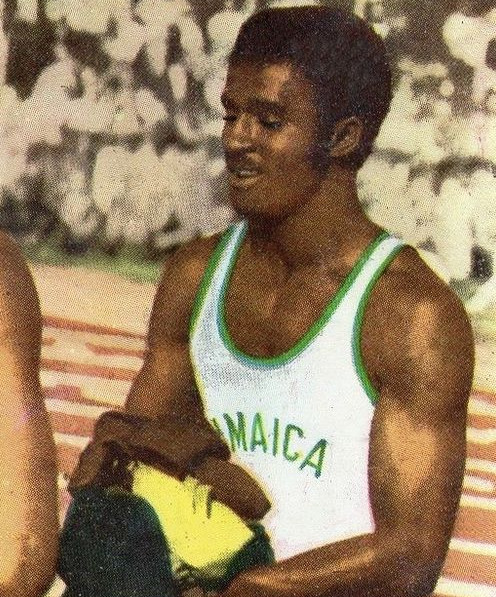
- Don Quarrie (1972)
- Venue: Olympic Stadium
- Date: 25 July 1976 (heats, quarterfinals); 26 July 1976 (semifinals, finals)
- Competitors: 45 from 33 nations
- Winning time: 20.23

Medalists
1st place, gold medalist(s)		Don Quarrie; Jamaica
2nd place, silver medalist(s)		Millard Hampton; United States
3rd place, bronze medalist(s)		Dwayne Evans; United States

Official Video Highlight @ 1:21:00

The men's 200 metres was an event at the 1976 Summer Olympics in Montreal. The competition was held on 25 July 1976 and 26 July 1976. There were 45 competitors from 33 nations. The maximum number of athletes per nation had been set at 3 since the 1930 Olympic Congress. The event was won by 0.06 seconds by Don Quarrie of Jamaica.

== Summary ==
Starting in lane 2, co-world record holder Don Quarrie of Jamaica was out to the lead from the gun. Only American Millard Hampton was in near contact. Through the turn, Hasely Crawford of Trinidad and Tobago pulled up and eventually limped home almost a minute behind the field. Coming off the turn another American, Dwayne Evans on the outside in lane 7, and future world record holder Italian Pietro Mennea across the track in lane 1, were battling for bronze with Bogdan Grzejszczak of Poland the next pursuer. Quarrie won the gold medal, with Hampton finishing close second. Meanwhile, Evans had the stronger finish to hold off Mennea. The fastest finish of all was by Rui da Silva, who came off the turn in dead last but made up several metres to take fifth.

Quarrie's gold was Jamaica's first medal in the men's 200 metres. The United States extended its podium streak in the event to 10 Games.

== Background ==
This was the 17th appearance of the event, which was not held at the first Olympics in 1896 but has been on the program ever since. One of the eight finalists from the 1972 Games returned: bronze medalist Pietro Mennea of Italy. The favorite was Don Quarrie of Jamaica, who had also been favored four years earlier in Munich but pulled a hamstring in the semifinals. His biggest competitors in 1976 were Steve Williams of the United States, who was out injured, and James Gilkes of Guyana, who was not competing due to the African boycott.

Antigua and Barbuda, the Ivory Coast, Kuwait, and Papua New Guinea each made their debut in the event. The United States made its 17th appearance, the only nation to have competed at each edition of the men's 200 metres to date.

== Competition format ==
The competition used the four round format introduced in 1920: heats, quarterfinals, semifinals, and a final. The "fastest loser" system introduced in 1960 was available but not used this Games due to the distribution of heats making it unnecessary.

There were 8 heats of between 6 and 7 runners each (before withdrawals), with the top 4 men in each advancing to the quarterfinals. The quarterfinals consisted of 4 heats of 8 athletes each; the 4 fastest men in each heat advanced to the semifinals. There were 2 semifinals, each with 8 runners. Again, the top 4 athletes advanced. The final had 8 runners. The races were run on a 400 metre track.

== Records ==
Prior to the competition, the existing world and Olympic records were as follows.

World record	Tommie Smith (USA)	19.83	Mexico City, Mexico	16 October 1968
Olympic record	Tommie Smith (USA)	19.83	Mexico City, Mexico	16 October 1968

No new world or Olympic records were set during the competition.

== Schedule ==
All times are Eastern Daylight Time (UTC-4)

Date	Time	Round
Sunday, 25 July 1976	10:30; 18:05	Heats; Quarterfinals
Monday, 26 July 1976	14:45; 16:50	Semifinals; Final

== Results ==
=== Heats ===
Held on July 25, 1976.

==== Heat 1 ====
Rank	Athlete	Nation	Time	Notes
1	Millard Hampton	United States	21.11	Q
2	Cuthbert Jacobs	Antigua and Barbuda	21.50	Q
3	Colin Bradford	Jamaica	21.57	Q
4	Armando Padilla	Nicaragua	23.07	Q
5	Hamed Ali	Saudi Arabia	23.37	
—	Ainsley Armstrong	Trinidad and Tobago	DNF	
—	Hannu Mäkelä	Finland	DNS	

==== Heat 2 ====
Rank	Athlete	Nation	Time	Notes
1	Rick Mitchell	Australia	21.91	Q
2	Peter Muster	Switzerland	22.33	Q
3	Hasely Crawford	Trinidad and Tobago	22.35	Q
4	Calvin Dill	Bermuda	22.38	Q
—	Felix Lopez Matias	Dominican Republic	DNS	
—	Aleksandr Aksinin	Soviet Union	DNS	

==== Heat 3 ====
Rank	Athlete	Nation	Time	Notes
1	Dwayne Evans	United States	20.96	Q
2	Peter Fitzgerald	Australia	21.35	Q
3	Georges Kablan Degnan	Ivory Coast	21.57	Q
4	Abdul Aziz Abdul Kareem	Kuwait	22.44	Q
5	Rawle Clarke	Barbados	22.75	
—	Colin Thurton	Belize	DNS	
—	Petar Petrov	Bulgaria	DNS	

==== Heat 4 ====
Rank	Athlete	Nation	Time	Notes
1	Guy Abrahams	Panama	20.95	Q
2	Thorsten Johansson	Sweden	21.05	Q
3	Pietro Farina	Italy	21.32	Q
4	Nikolay Kolesnikov	Soviet Union	21.33	Q
5	Mark Lutz	United States	21.50	
6	Christian Dorosario	Senegal	21.96	
—	Robert Martin	Canada	DNS	

==== Heat 5 ====
Rank	Athlete	Nation	Time	Notes
1	Pietro Mennea	Italy	20.93	Q
2	Zenon Nowosz	Poland	21.29	Q
3	Joseph Arame	France	21.34	Q
4	Sammy Monsels	Suriname	21.60	Q
5	Ramli Ahmad	Malaysia	21.92	
—	Clive Sands	Bahamas	DNF	
—	Hermes Ramirez	Cuba	DNS	

==== Heat 6 ====
Rank	Athlete	Nation	Time	Notes
1	Ainsley Bennett	Great Britain	21.26	Q
2	Bogdan Grzejszczak	Poland	21.35	Q
3	Pedro Ferrer	Puerto Rico	21.60	Q
4	Tony Moore	Fiji	21.82	Q
5	Philippe Étienne	Haiti	22.57	
—	Francisco Gómez	Cuba	DNS	
—	Valeriy Borzov	Soviet Union	DNS	

==== Heat 7 ====
Rank	Athlete	Nation	Time	Notes
1	Don Quarrie	Jamaica	20.85	Q
2	Rui da Silva	Brazil	20.99	Q
3	Endre Lépold	Hungary	21.50	Q
4	Walter Callander	Bahamas	21.79	Q
5	Marian Woronin	Poland	21.90	
6	Ayoub Bodaghi	Iran	22.47	
7	Wavala Kali	Papua New Guinea	22.64	

==== Heat 8 ====
Rank	Athlete	Nation	Time	Notes
1	Roland Bombardella	Luxembourg	21.18	Q
2	Lambert Micha	Belgium	21.25	Q
3	Jean Mayer	France	21.25	Q
4	Hugh Fraser	Canada	21.54	Q
5	Barka Sy	Senegal	21.54	
6	Vittorio Milanesio	Italy	21.94	
—	Silvio Leonard	Cuba	DNS	

=== Quarterfinals ===
Held on July 25, 1976.

==== Quarterfinal 1 ====
Rank	Athlete	Nation	Time	Notes
1	Dwayne Evans	United States	20.56	Q
2	Guy Abrahams	Panama	20.72	Q
3	Rui da Silva	Brazil	20.76	Q
4	Colin Bradford	Jamaica	21.03	Q
5	Peter Muster	Switzerland	21.09	
6	Zenon Nowosz	Poland	21.22	
7	Pietro Farina	Italy	21.31	
8	Hugh Fraser	Canada	21.57	

==== Quarterfinal 2 ====
Rank	Athlete	Nation	Time	Notes
1	Pietro Mennea	Italy	20.70	Q
2	Georges Kablan Degnan	Ivory Coast	20.91	Q
3	Ainsley Bennett	Great Britain	21.07	Q
4	Nikolay Kolesnikov	Soviet Union	21.08	Q
5	Thorsten Johansson	Sweden	21.08	
6	Calvin Dill	Bermuda	21.40	
7	Endre Lépold	Hungary	21.68	
—	Richard Mitchell	Australia	DNS	

==== Quarterfinal 3 ====
Rank	Athlete	Nation	Time	Notes
1	Don Quarrie	Jamaica	20.28	Q
2	Millard Hampton	United States	20.83	Q
3	Joseph Arame	France	21.04	Q
4	Lambert Micha	Belgium	21.09	Q
5	Sammy Monsels	Suriname	21.29	
6	Cuthbert Jacobs	Antigua and Barbuda	21.33	
7	Tony Moore	Fiji	21.75	
8	Abdul Aziz Abdul Kareem	Kuwait	22.34	

==== Quarterfinal 4 ====
Rank	Athlete	Nation	Time	Notes
1	Hasely Crawford	Trinidad and Tobago	20.95	Q
2	Bogdan Grzejszczak	Poland	21.02	Q
3	Roland Bombardella	Luxembourg	21.03	Q
4	Peter Fitzgerald	Australia	21.07	Q
5	Pedro Ferrer	Puerto Rico	21.33	
6	Walter Callander	Bahamas	21.78	
7	Armando Padilla	Nicaragua	22.74	
8	Jean Mayer	France	24.27	

=== Semifinals ===
Held on July 26, 1976.

==== Semifinal 1 ====
Rank	Athlete	Nation	Time	Notes
1	Pietro Mennea	Italy	20.67	Q
2	Millard Hampton	United States	20.69	Q
3	Hasely Crawford	Trinidad and Tobago	20.99	Q
4	Colin Bradford	Jamaica	21.09	Q
5	Georges Kablan Degnan	Ivory Coast	21.14	
6	Roland Bombardella	Luxembourg	21.16	
7	Nikolay Kolesnikov	Soviet Union	21.25	
8	Peter Fitzgerald	Australia	21.29	

==== Semifinal 2 ====
Rank	Athlete	Nation	Time	Notes
1	Don Quarrie	Jamaica	20.48	Q
2	Dwayne Evans	United States	20.83	Q
3	Rui da Silva	Brazil	21.01	Q
4	Bogdan Grzejszczak	Poland	21.14	Q
5	Guy Abrahams	Panama	21.15	
6	Joseph Arame	France	21.29	
7	Lambert Micha	Belgium	21.46	
8	Ainsley Bennett	Great Britain	21.52	

=== Final ===
Held on July 26, 1976. The Official Report has Crawford listed as did not finish.

Rank	Lane	Athlete	Nation	Time
1st place, gold medalist(s)	2	Don Quarrie	Jamaica	20.23
2nd place, silver medalist(s)	4	Millard Hampton	United States	20.29
3rd place, bronze medalist(s)	7	Dwayne Evans	United States	20.43
4	1	Pietro Mennea	Italy	20.54
5	8	Rui da Silva	Brazil	20.84
6	6	Bogdan Grzejszczak	Poland	20.91
7	3	Colin Bradford	Jamaica	21.17
8	5	Hasely Crawford	Trinidad and Tobago	1:19.60
