= Milanesio =

Milanesio is an Italian surname. Notable people with the surname include:

- Marcelo Milanesio (born 1965), Argentine retired basketball player
- Vittorino Milanesio (born 1953), Italian retired sprinter
