= Mayeur =

Mayeur is a French surname. Notable people with the surname include:

- Bernard Mayeur (1938–2004), French basketball player
- Hayden Mayeur (born 1997), Canadian speed skater
- Jean Mayeur (1928–1997), French jeweller
- Yvan Mayeur (born 1960), Belgian politician

== See also ==
- Adrien-Jean Le Mayeur (1880–1958), Belgian painter
