= Irvin Rockman =

Australian politician

Irvin Peter Rockman CBE

85th Lord Mayor of Melbourne
- In office 1977–1979
- Preceded by: Donald Osborne
- Succeeded by: Ralph Angelo Bernardi

Personal details
- Born: 6 April 1938 Melbourne, Victoria, Australia
- Died: 30 August 2010 (aged 72)

Irvin Peter "Rocky" Rockman CBE (6 April 1938 – 30 August 2010) was an Australian politician, businessman, and hotelier who served as Lord Mayor of Melbourne from 1977 to 1979.

== Biography ==
Irvin Rockman was born on 6 April 1938, the son of Polish father Norman Rockman (1910–2001) and Ukrainian mother Susie Rockman (1916–2007). Both settled in Melbourne in 1924 to escape anti-Jewish persecution in their home countries.

where Norman Rockman established a chain of clothing stores, which operated under the family name. Rockman attended high school at Wesley College, where he excelled at sports.

He then attended the University of Melbourne, where he undertook a commerce degree. Rockman was also a well-known underwater diver. Irvin Rockman was married three times and had six children.

=== Business career ===
Rockman entered the hotel industry through his upmarket Motel Parkroyal at Parkville. Opened in November 1961, the modern building comprised 90 luxury suites and proved an instant success, garnering praise from Victorian Premier Henry Bolte. It was designed by Theodore Bertram, and featured a large parabolic arch at the entrance.

In anticipation of the Commonwealth Government’s construction of Melbourne Airport at Tullamarine, Rockman partnered with several private interests to bid for the airport’s food and beverage concession. The bid was successful, and the syndicate, known as Aerojet Caterers, operated as a joint venture between Petersville Corporation and investors Paul Fayman and Joseph Emanuel. The company ran the notable Top Air restaurant, which overlooked the airport and its operations. Rockman maintained his interest in Aerojet until 1992.

Rockman was alleged to have been involved in a 1988 drug smuggling scandal, but no charges were ever filed and Rockman maintained his innocence.

Preceded by Donald Osborne	Lord Mayor of Melbourne; 1977–1979	Succeeded by Ralph Angelo Bernardi
