= Armando Padilla =

Nicaraguan sprinter

Personal information
- Nationality: Nicaraguan
- Born: 27 August 1956 (age 69)

Sport
- Sport: Sprinting
- Event: 100 metres

Armando Padilla (born 27 August 1956) is a Nicaraguan sprinter. He competed in the men's 100 metres and 200 metres at the 1976 Summer Olympics.

== Career ==
In August 1975, Padilla set the Nicaraguan 100 m record at the 1975 Central American and Caribbean Championships in Athletics, running 10.6 seconds hand-timed. Also in 1975, Padilla set his 200 m personal best of 22.0 seconds.

Padilla was seeded in the 2nd heat of the 100 metres at the 1976 Olympics. He finished 8th, running 11.52 seconds and failing to advance.

He was also entered in the 200 metres, seeded in the 1st heat. He ran 23.07 seconds to place 4th, advancing as a place-based qualifier to the quarter-finals. His achievement of qualifying from the heats to the quarter-finals was called the greatest achievement of a Nicaraguan runner. His performance was said to have been aided by the withdrawal of three African competitors in his heat.

In the quarter-finals later that day, Padilla improved upon his time to run 22.74 seconds, but only finished 7th and did not advance to the semi-finals.

As of 2024, Padilla is one of only three Nicaraguan athletes to have advanced to the second round at any Olympic games, along with Yeykell Romero in 2021 and María Alejandra Carmona in 2024.

== Personal life ==
Padilla lived in the United States for several years. He was considered a strong candidate for the Nicaraguan Sports Hall of Fame due to his 1976 performance.
