= St Bede's College (Bentleigh East) =

Catholic secondary school in Victoria, Australia

St Bede's College, Bentleigh East
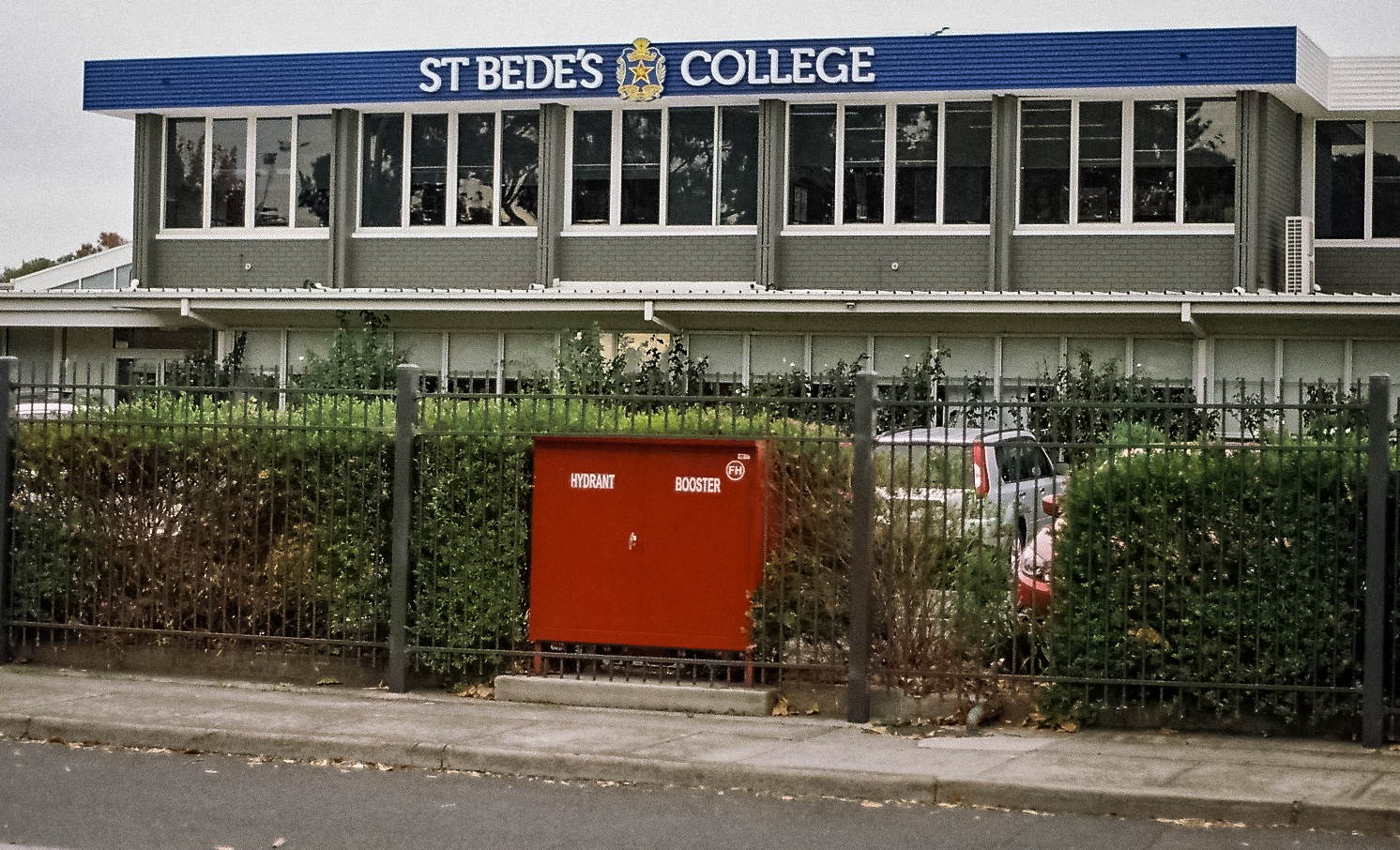

Location
- 156 Bignell Road; Bentleigh East, Victoria; Australia; 37°55′36″S 145°4′16″E

Information
- Former name: St James College
- Type: Catholic boys secondary education
- Motto: Per Vias Rectas (By Right Paths)
- Religious affiliation: Roman Catholic
- Established: 1970
- Sister school: OLSH Bentleigh
- Campus Director: Trent Collins
- Years: 7–9
- Enrolment: approx. 260 students
  - Grade 7: approx. 80 students
  - Grade 8: approx. 90 students
  - Grade 9: 80-90 students
- Average class size: 25 students
- Language: English; Indonesian and Italian are taught as LOTE
- Schedule: 10 weekday timetable cycle
- Classrooms: Over 30
- Campus: St Bede's College Bentleigh East Campus
- Houses: McCristal; Solomon; Benilde; LaSalle
- Colours: Blue, red, gold
- School fees: Year 7: $10,530 (2025); Year 8: $10,480 (2025); Year 9: $10,530 (2025); Year 10: $10,680 (2025); Year 11: $10,430 (2025); Year 12: $10,430 (2025)
- Affiliations: Roman Catholic, De La Salle Brothers
- Website: www.stbedes.catholic.edu.au

St Bede's College Bentleigh East Campus (formerly St James College) is tailored to students in Years 7 to 9. It is located in Bentleigh East, a suburb of Melbourne, Australia. The campus has around 250 students, and is administered by the De La Salle Brothers, a teaching order of Christian Brothers. As of the start of 2024, the Campus Director is Trent Collins. At the beginning of 2021, St James College was amalgamated into St Bede's College in Mentone, operating as a dedicated middle years campus.

== History ==
The College opened in 1970 in association with the De La Salle Brothers as St James Regional College, in order to serve six Catholic parishes in a fast-growing area of suburban Melbourne, and moved from temporary accommodation to the first buildings on its present campus in 1971. By 1984, it was serving four Catholic additional parishes. In early 2021, it became a campus of St Bede's College, Mentone, adopting its name and uniform.

Some of the College's alumni have gone on to play in Australian sports such as Australian Rules Football. St Peter's Church Bentleigh East used to host masses for the students at the College, but they are now held at the College's campus in Mentone.

In 2024, Allegations of historic child sex abuse were made against the school, relating to alleged abuse between 1975 to 1985 at the Bentleigh East campus.

== College Principals ==
Principal	Years & duration
Br. Sean Paul Lockhart	1970–1974; 5 years
Br. Kevin Moloney	1975–1976; 2 years
Br. John Corkeron	1977–1984; 8 years
Br. Joseph Gabel	1985–1986; 2 years
Br. Michael McCabe	1987–1988; 2 years
Br. Raymond Khan	1989–1990; 2 years
Br. James Taylor	1991–1996; 6 years

https://issuu.com/delasalle/docs/2004_sept_roll_call

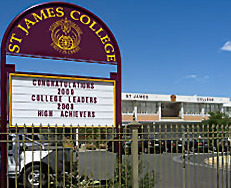
Photo of the school when it was known as St James College.

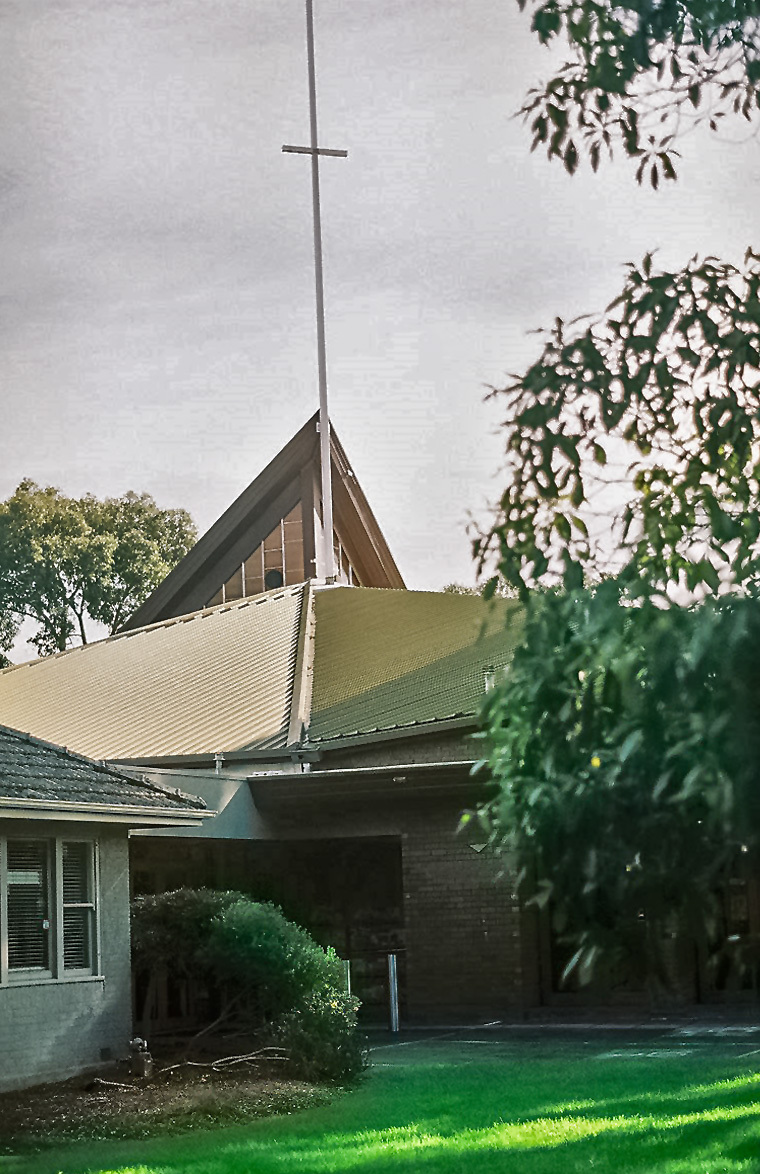
St Peter's Church Bentleigh East, near St Bede's where the students formerly attended mass

== Alumni ==
- Ljubo Miličević – Former Melbourne Victory, Newcastle Jets HAL player
- Nick Staikos – State Member for Bentleigh (2014–)
- Steve Staikos – Mayor of City of Kingston (2010–2011)
- Liam Sumner – AFL player for Carlton Football Club
- Luke Beveridge – AFL Premiership coach
- Jarryd Lyons - Australian Football League player for Brisbane Lions

== See also ==
- St Bede's College, Mentone
