= European Network of Fugitive Active Search Teams =

European fugitive search network

The European Network of Fugitive Active Search Teams (ENFAST) is a network of fugitive search teams from member states of the European Union. ENFAST was established in 2013, and is supported by Europol.

== History ==
In 2010, an initiative to create a European network of fugitive teams was proposed at a conference attended by 24 teams from the European Union. The initiative aimed to enable more efficient collaboration among EU police units responsible for fugitive active search (FAST). On 1 January 2013, the European Council adopted the initiative and created the European Network of Fugitive Active Search Teams (ENFAST). The network is governed by one of its member teams for two-year presidential terms. Some non-EU member states hold non-voting observer status with ENFAST to enable cooperation among outside countries where fugitives may be hiding.

== EU Most Wanted ==
In January 2016, ENFAST launched the EU Most Wanted website to list internationally wanted fugitives and invite tips. Fugitives listed on the website are subjects of European Arrest Warrants, and each member state decides which fugitives to include in the list. Fugitives on the list have either been convicted of, or are suspected of committing, high-profile crimes or terrorist acts in Europe. Between its creation and December 2024, the website had listed 454 fugitive profiles, and Europol attributed 53 of 164 fugitive arrests to the inclusion of their profiles on the website.

=== List as of April 2026 ===
The following people are listed on Europe's Most Wanted:

Name	Date added	Wanted by	Status	Crimes (alleged or convicted)	Notes
Margus Nõmme	10 November 2023	Estonia	Ongoing investigation	Sexual exploitation of children, child pornography	
Tomas Bolgovas	29 November 2024	Lithuania	Ongoing investigation	Murder, grievous bodily injury	Bolgovas is wanted for his alleged role in the 2015 murder-for-hire of Deimantas Bugavičius, the romantic partner of Lithuanian pop star Vita Jakutienė.
Martin Šmatlák	14 November 2023	Slovakia	Ongoing investigation	Illicit narcotics trafficking	Šmatlák is wanted for his alleged role in a criminal organisation that produced and sold methamphetamine.
Leons Rusiņš	29 April 2023	Latvia	Ongoing investigation	Murder, grievous bodily injury	Rusiņš is wanted for the alleged axe murder of his ex-wife, committed in front of their son and her mother in April 2023.
Abdullah Khodor	9 March 2022	Luxembourg	Ongoing investigation	Kidnapping and hostage-taking, laundering the proceeds of a crime, organised or armed robbery, participation in a criminal organisation	Khodor is wanted for an alleged armed home invasion and robbery in Gonderange, Luxembourg in December 2017.
Vladimir Vaclavek	3 December 2024	Croatia	Ongoing investigation	Murder, grievous bodily injury	Vaclavek is wanted on suspicion of committing a murder in October 2001.
Ali Shehab Ahmed	29 November 2024	Sweden	Ongoing investigation	Murder, grievous bodily injury	Shehab Ahmed is wanted for murders he is suspected of committing in Farsta, Stockholm, Sweden in June 2023.
Darius Pozarickij	13 November 2023	Lithuania	Convicted, sentenced to 11 years in prison	Illicit narcotics trafficking	Pozarickij is wanted for smuggling large quantities of cannabis.
Richard James Schueler	18 December 2024	Finland	Ongoing investigation	Fraud	Schueler is wanted for alleged tax evasion amounting to hundreds of millions of euros, and for alleged assault on a sixteen-year-old victim.
Alexander Elberg	5 December 2024	Germany	Ongoing investigation	Murder, grievous bodily injury	Elberg is wanted on suspicion of committing the 1991 murder of a man on a forest path in Southern Germany.
Jian Xia	4 December 2024	Netherlands	Ongoing investigation	Murder, grievous bodily injury	Xia is wanted for the alleged 2004 murder of a pregnant student in Haarlem, Netherlands.
Vincenzo Parisi	3 December 2024	Italy	Convicted, sentenced to life imprisonment	Murder, grievous bodily injury	A member of the Foggian Mafia, Parisi is wanted for the murder of two men.
Janko Lavrič	24 November 2023	Slovenia	Failed to return to serve his sentence after suspension	Fraud	After being imprisoned for several criminal fraud convictions, Lavrič is wanted after failing to return from temporary release.
Giovanni Motisi	14 October 2016	Italy	Convicted, sentenced to life imprisonment	Murder, grievous bodily injury, participation in a criminal organisation	A member of the Sicilian Mafia, Motisi has been a fugitive since 1998 as a Mafia leader who has murdered several members of the Italian police.
Anton Zhivkov Petkovski	19 August 2019	Bulgaria	Convicted, sentenced to life imprisonment	Attempted murder	After Petkovski and an associate killed a man with a machine gun in December 2001, Petkovski killed his associate.
Sali Ahmet	25 November 2021	Cyprus	Ongoing investigation	Attempted murder, murder, grievous bodily injury	Ahmet is wanted for allegedly stabbing to death a British citizen vacationing in Cyprus in 2016, and the attempted murder of a friend of the victim.
Cristian Hernan Yong Granadino	2 December 2024	Spain	Failed to attend court	Murder, grievous bodily injury	Yong Granadino is wanted for allegedly murdering a sixteen-year-old girl who had left an abusive relationship with him.
Sami Bekal Bounouare	18 November 2024	Netherlands	Ongoing investigation	Murder, grievous bodily injury	Bekal Bounouare is wanted on suspicion of the June 2024 attempted assassination of an Iranian activist in Haarlem, the November 2023 attempted assassination of Alejo Vidal-Quadras Roca in Madrid, and the contract killing of Wisam Al-Albassi in 2021 in Capelle aan den IJssel.
János Gál	25 November 2024	Hungary	Ongoing investigation	Murder, grievous bodily injury	Gál is wanted for allegedly stabbing his wife and mother-in-law in September 2024, killing his wife and injuring her mother.
Tibor Foco	17 September 2015	Austria	Escaped from prison on 27 April 1995	Murder, grievous bodily injury	Foco was sentenced to life in prison after killing a prostitute in March 1986. He escaped from prison while on study leave.
Jesse Robert Shipley	4 June 2024	Finland	Convicted, sentenced to 12 years and 2 months in prison	Illicit narcotics trafficking	
Hamid Nour Eddine G Ibrahim	18 January 2017	Malta	Ongoing investigation	Murder, grievous bodily injury	Ibrahim is wanted for allegedly stabbing to death his ex-girlfriend in March 2015.
Renaldas Kanys	7 September 2020	Lithuania	Ongoing investigation	Illicit narcotics trafficking, murder, grievous bodily injury, participation in a criminal organisation	Kanys is wanted for alleged large-scale trafficking of cocaine and hashish between 2007 and 2017, as well as on suspicion of organising the killing of a man in June 2015.
Kamil Żyła	7 September 2023	Poland	Ongoing investigation	Murder, grievous bodily injury	Żyła is wanted for allegedly stabbing to death and strangling a victim in Chorzów, Poland in March 2022.
Krystian Kolompar	3 December 2024	Poland	Ongoing investigation	Murder, grievous bodily injury	Kolompar is wanted for the alleged murder and robbery of a person in Kraków, Poland in December 2021.
Vilém Kováč	10 November 2023	Czech Republic	Ongoing investigation	Illicit narcotics trafficking, participation in a criminal organisation	Kováč is alleged to be the head of a criminal organisation importing, exporting, and distributing illicit drugs and cigarettes.
Adrian Munteanu	16 November 2023	Romania	Convicted, sentenced to 11.8 years in prison	Participation in a criminal organisation, sexual exploitation of children, child pornography, human trafficking	Munteanu is wanted for his participation from 2012 to 2017 in a sex trafficking organisation.
Amin Qatra	11 July 2016	Denmark	Ongoing investigation	Murder, grievous bodily injury	Qatra is wanted on suspicion of committing a stabbing murder in June 2016 in Vejle, Denmark.
Steffen van Khoa Do	1 October 2021	Denmark	Escaped from custody after he was arrested on 1 March 2021	Illicit narcotics trafficking	Do escaped prison in June 2021 after he was arrested for attempting to rob a shipping container containing 300 kilograms (660 lb) of cocaine.
Róbert Okoličany	14 November 2023	Slovakia	Convicted, sentenced to life imprisonment	Participation in a criminal organisation	Okoličany is wanted after fleeing the country the same day he was sentenced to life in prison for his role as the head of the Eastern Slovak mafia, as well as his participation in murders and other violent crimes.
Daniel Tomasz Panek	20 August 2024	Slovenia	Failed to attend court	Rape	
Renato Cinquegranella	27 September 2022	Italy	Convicted, sentenced to life imprisonment	Murder, grievous bodily injury	Cinquegranella is wanted after being sentenced to life in prison for murder, possession of illegal weapons, extortion, and other crimes as a member of the Camorra.
Ivan Šimetić	5 November 2024	Croatia	Ongoing investigation	Attempted murder	Šimetić is wanted for two alleged attempted murders in February 2022 in Poreč, Croatia.
Joseph "Jos" Johannes Leijdekkers	20 May 2022	Netherlands	Convicted, sentenced to 24 years in prison	Illicit narcotics trafficking	Leijdekkers is wanted for his role in large-scale international cocaine trafficking, laundering criminal proceeds amounting to dozens of millions of euros and hundreds of kilograms of gold, and violent incidents. He is also suspected in kidnapping and torturing another trafficker of drugs, Naima Jillal, who went missing in Amsterdam in October 2019. Leijdekkers was sentenced to 24 years in prison for drug trafficking, armed robbery, and ordering a contract killing.
Adrian Cotos	16 November 2023	Romania	Convicted, sentenced to 10.5 years in prison	Illicit narcotics trafficking	Cotos is wanted for trafficking in cocaine.
Abdou Njie	29 November 2024	Sweden	Ongoing investigation	Murder, grievous bodily injury	Njie is wanted for the alleged shooting murder of a victim in August 2022 in Stockholm, Sweden, and the attempted murder of two others.
Marco Ebben	17 November 2023	Netherlands	Convicted, sentenced to 7 years in prison	Illicit narcotics trafficking	Ebben is wanted for smuggling 400 kilograms (880 lb) of cocaine into the Netherlands.
Farid Toloun	28 September 2022	France	Convicted, sentenced to 24 years in prison	Murder, grievous bodily injury	Toloun is wanted for his participation in a criminal organisation known for armed robberies and narcotics trafficking. Toloun was a participant in a June 2005 attack on two rival gang members, in which one was injured and one was killed.
Wilhelmus Beckmann	5 December 2024	Germany	Convicted, sentenced to 29 years in prison	Murder, grievous bodily harm	Beckmann is wanted for murdering his girlfriend, staging a violent robbery, and setting fire to the building in Merksplas in 2008.
Aleks Burreli	23 November 2016	Cyprus	Ongoing investigation	Murder, grievous bodily harm, arson	Burreli is wanted for his alleged participation in a June 2016 shooting in a restaurant in Ayia Napa, in which he and an accomplice killed three people and injured two others. Burreli is also suspected to have been involved in other murders in Cyprus, as part of the same criminal organisation behind the murders in Ayia Napa.
Cristel Crinu Andronic	3 December 2024	Romania	Convicted, sentenced to 8.5 years in prison	Attempted murder	Andronic is wanted after attacking a victim with his fists, a bottle, and a rock in November 2017.
Engelbert Balogh	22 November 2024	Hungary	Ongoing investigation	Attempted murder	Balogh is wanted for allegedly stabbing a friend during an argument in October 2022 in Tatabanya, Hungary.
Tomislav Drmić	15 November 2023	Croatia	Ongoing investigation	Participation in a criminal organisation	Drmić is wanted for his alleged involvement with and criminal activities as part of a criminal organisation, including producing and trafficking illegal drugs, and illegal possession, manufacturing, and procurement of weapons and explosives.
Ramón de la Camara Guisado	5 December 2023	Spain	Failed to attend court	Murder, grievous bodily injury	de la Camara is wanted for allegedly shooting his son in the back of the head in a pub in Sabadell.
Karim Ouali	22 November 2016	France	Ongoing investigation	Murder, grievous bodily injury	Ouali is wanted after allegedly killing his colleague Jean Mayer with an ax during a psychotic episode in 2011, while they both were working as air traffic controllers at EuroAirport Basel Mulhouse Freiburg.
Radoje Zvicer	13 November 2024	Austria	Ongoing investigation	Illicit narcotics trafficking	Zvicer is wanted for his alleged participation in smuggling 83 kilograms (183 lb) of cocaine into Austria, as a leader of a criminal organisation.
Eva Zamečniková	30 November 2021	Slovakia	Convicted, sentenced to 8 years in prison	Attempted murder	Zamečniková is wanted after being sentenced to 8 years in prison after ordering the contract killing of her husband in January 2014. The hired killer turned her in to police.
Saidkhuseyn Naurbayev	29 November 2024	Czech Republic	Convicted, sentenced to 17.5 years in prison	Murder, grievous bodily injury	Naurbayev is wanted for murdering, torturing, and robbing a victim in Žabčice in the Czech Republic in May 2015.
Māris Jankevics	16 February 2024	Latvia	Ongoing investigation	Murder, grievous bodily injury	Jankevics is wanted for the suspected murder of a woman in February 2022 after beating, stabbing, and burning her.
Mustafa Mehmed Shakir	14 October 2021	Bulgaria	Convicted, sentenced to 16 years in prison	Illicit narcotics trafficking	Shakir is wanted for his participation in an organised drug trafficking group, with which he helped traffic more than 27 kilograms (60 lb) of heroin in November 2009.
Asif Abdul Razzaq	7 September 2026	Spain	Failed to attend court	Illicit traffick in narcotic drugs and psychotropic substances, laundering the proceeds of crime.	Razzaq is considered to be the leader of the so called "Dubai Bank",
Alex Harkály	9 September 2026	Hungary	Convicted, sentenced to 6 years in prison	Attempted Mured	Harkaly is wanted after attacking randomly a man.
Damien Constantini	16 September 2026	Luxembourg	Ongoing investigation	Attempted Murder	Constantini is wanted after assaulting and stabbing a man in Monfort, Luxembourg in September 2025.
Armin Moini	23 March 2026	Sweden	Ongoing investigation	Illicit traffick in narcotic drugs and psychotropic substances, Illicit traffick in weapons, munitions and explosives, Laundering the proceeds of crime.	Moini is wanted in connection with multiple serious offences, including aggravated narcotics offences, aggravated money laundering and aggravated weapons crimes. The offences were committed between May 2019 and June 2020
Jörgen Haglund	25 September 2026	Sweden	Convicted, sentenced to 4 years and 11 months in prison	Illicit traffick in narcotic drugs and psychotropic substances	Haglund is wanted for a gross narcotic offence during April 2025 in south Stockolm. He is believed to be in Southern Europe.
