= Bogdan Grzejszczak =

Polish sprinter

Personal information
- Full name: Bogdan Marek Grzejszczak
- Nationality: Polish
- Born: 2 June 1950 (age 76) Piotrków Trybunalski, Poland
- Height: 1.69 m (5 ft 7 in)
- Weight: 65 m

Sport
- Sport: Sprinting
- Event: 200 metres
- Club: Górnik Zabrze

Bogdan Grzejszczak (born 2 June 1950) is a Polish sprinter. He competed in the men's 200 metres at the 1976 Summer Olympics held in Montreal, Quebec, Canada and he finished in 6th place. He also competed in the men's 4 × 100 metres relay and the Polish team finished in 4th place.

== Personal bests ==
Outdoor

- 100 metres – 10.37 (1976)
- 200 metres – 20.91 (1976)
