= Bentleigh East =

- Suburb
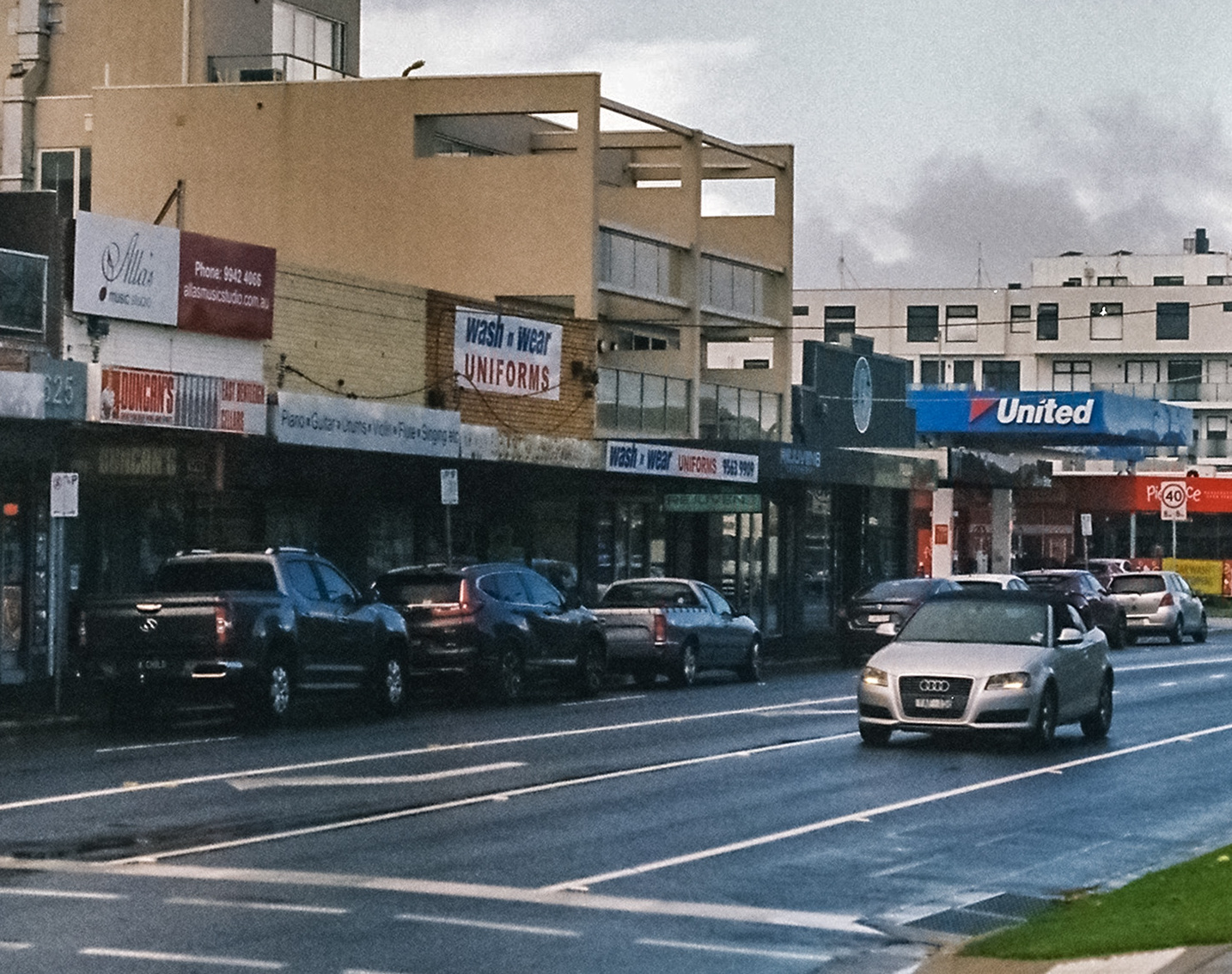
- Bentleigh East in 2022

- Interactive map of Bentleigh East
- Coordinates: 37.921°S 145.067°E
- Country: Australia
- State: Victoria
- LGA: City of Glen Eira
- Location: 14 km (8.7 mi) from Melbourne

Government
  - State electorates: Bentleigh; Clarinda
  - Federal divisions: Hotham; Goldstein

Area
  - Total: 9.2 km^{2} (3.6 sq mi)
- Elevation: 54 m (177 ft)

Population
  - Total: 30,159 (SAL 2021)
- Postcode: 3165
Suburbs around Bentleigh East
Ormond	Murrumbeena	Oakleigh
McKinnon	Bentleigh East	Oakleigh South
Bentleigh	Moorabbin	Heatherton

Bentleigh East is a suburb in Melbourne, Victoria, Australia, 14 km (8.7 mi) south-east of Melbourne's Central Business District, located within the City of Glen Eira local government area. Bentleigh East recorded a population of 30,159 at the 2021 census.

== History ==
The suburb, like its neighbour Bentleigh, was named after the infamous Victorian politician Thomas Bent. Part of East Bentleigh was inside the original grant of land bought by English farmer and brewer, Henry Dendy, in 1841. He bought 5,120 acres (20.7 km^{2}) which was bounded on the west by Port Phillip Bay, then North Road, East Boundary Road and South Road.

East Bentleigh police station closed in the early 1990s. The building no longer remains standing on the corner of East Boundary Road and Omeo Court, near Centre Road (opposite the hotel).

The East Village urban renewal plan (for the 25-hectare industrial/commercial site on the corner of East Boundary Road and North Road) will transition the site into a bustling hub of innovative jobs (some existing Virginia park businesses will remain), diverse housing, schools, shopping/dining and open space.

== Population ==
In the 2016 census, there were 27,635 people in Bentleigh East. 62.5% of residents were born in Australia.

== Geography ==
Larger than its namesake Bentleigh (and featuring a completely unrelated postcode), East Bentleigh is 14 km south-east from Melbourne's Central Business District. Its boundaries form a square shape, which is to the west by Tucker Road, to the north by North Road, to the east by Warrigal Road and to the south by South Road. It is bisected by Centre Road east-west and East Boundary Road north-south. The area around Mackie Road is the locality of Coatesville. East Bentleigh generally enjoys smooth road surfaces.

== Education ==
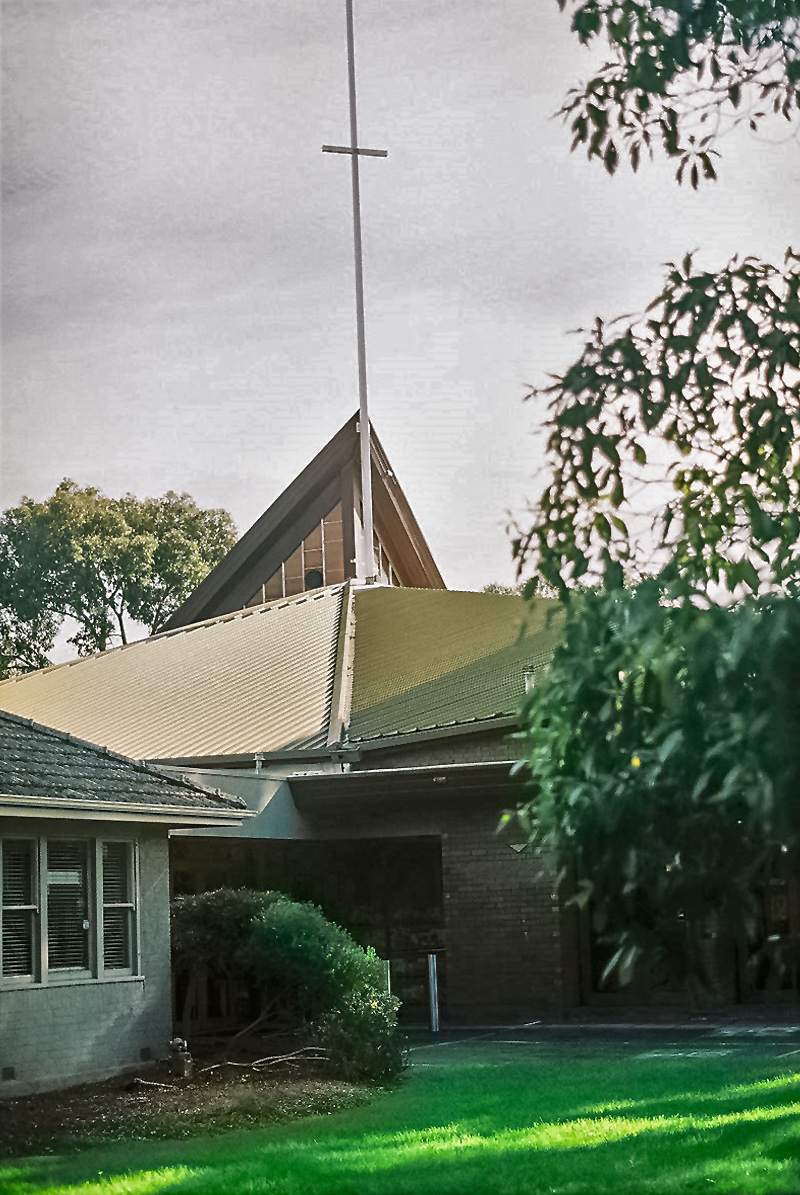
St Peters Bentleigh East Catholic Church

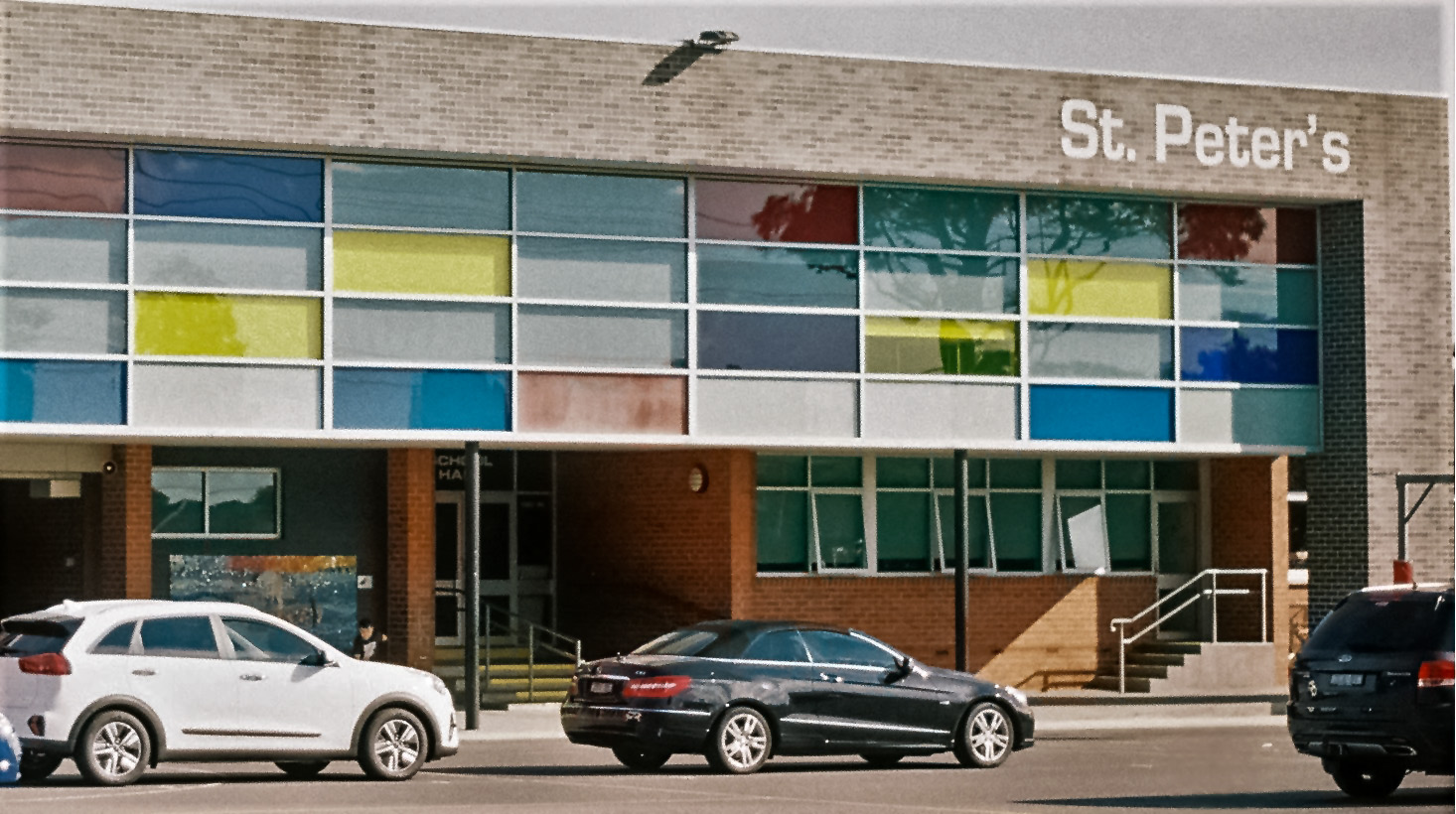
St Peter's Primary School in East Bentleigh

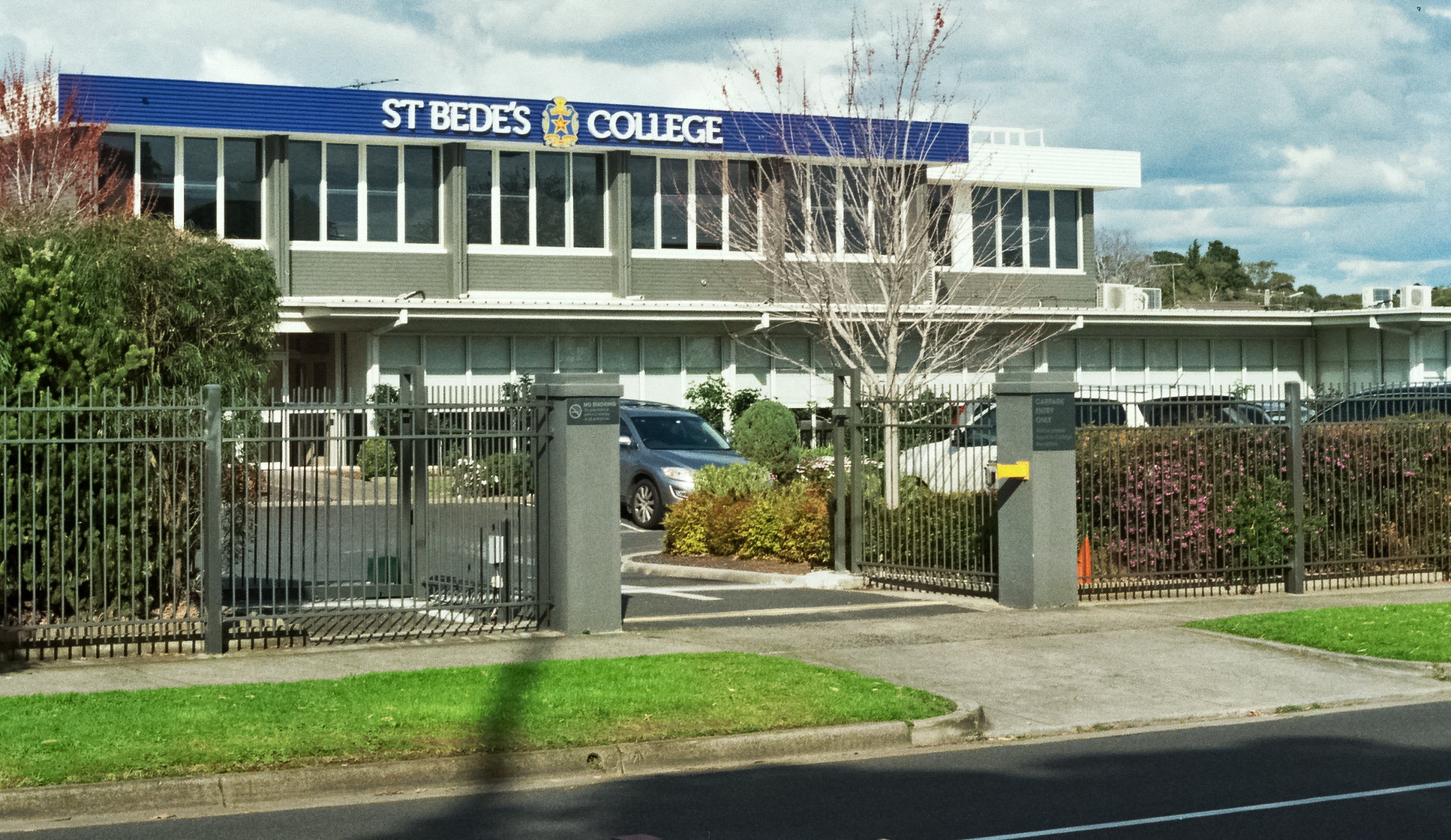
St Bedes's College East Bentleigh

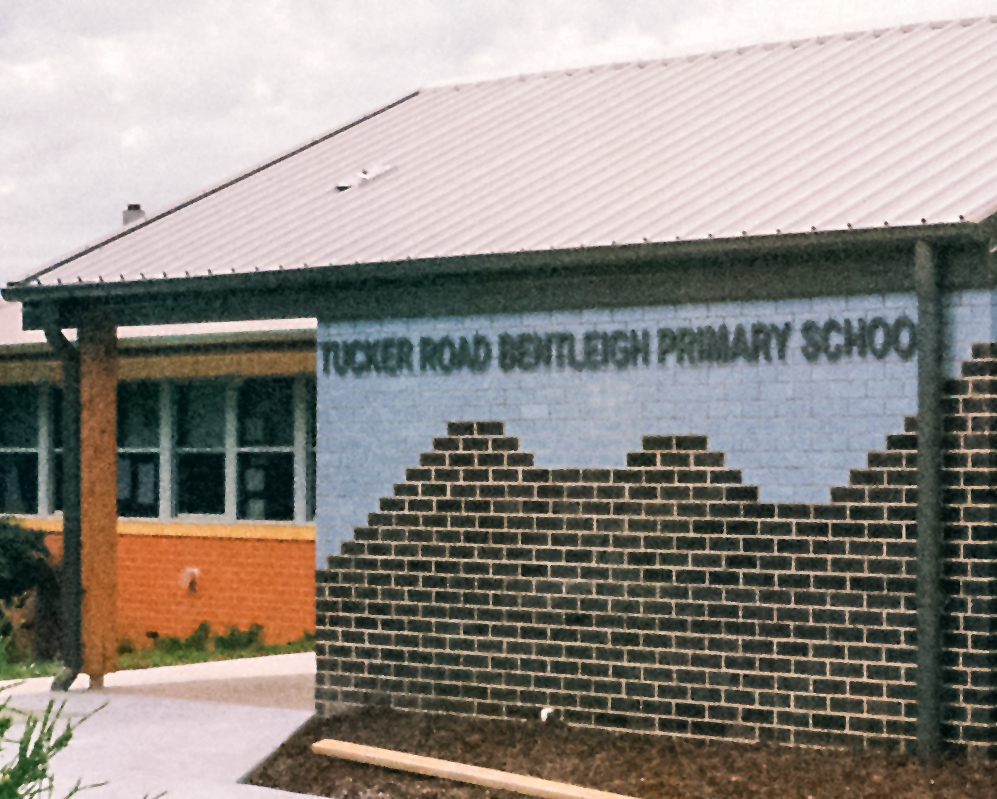
Tucker Road Primary School

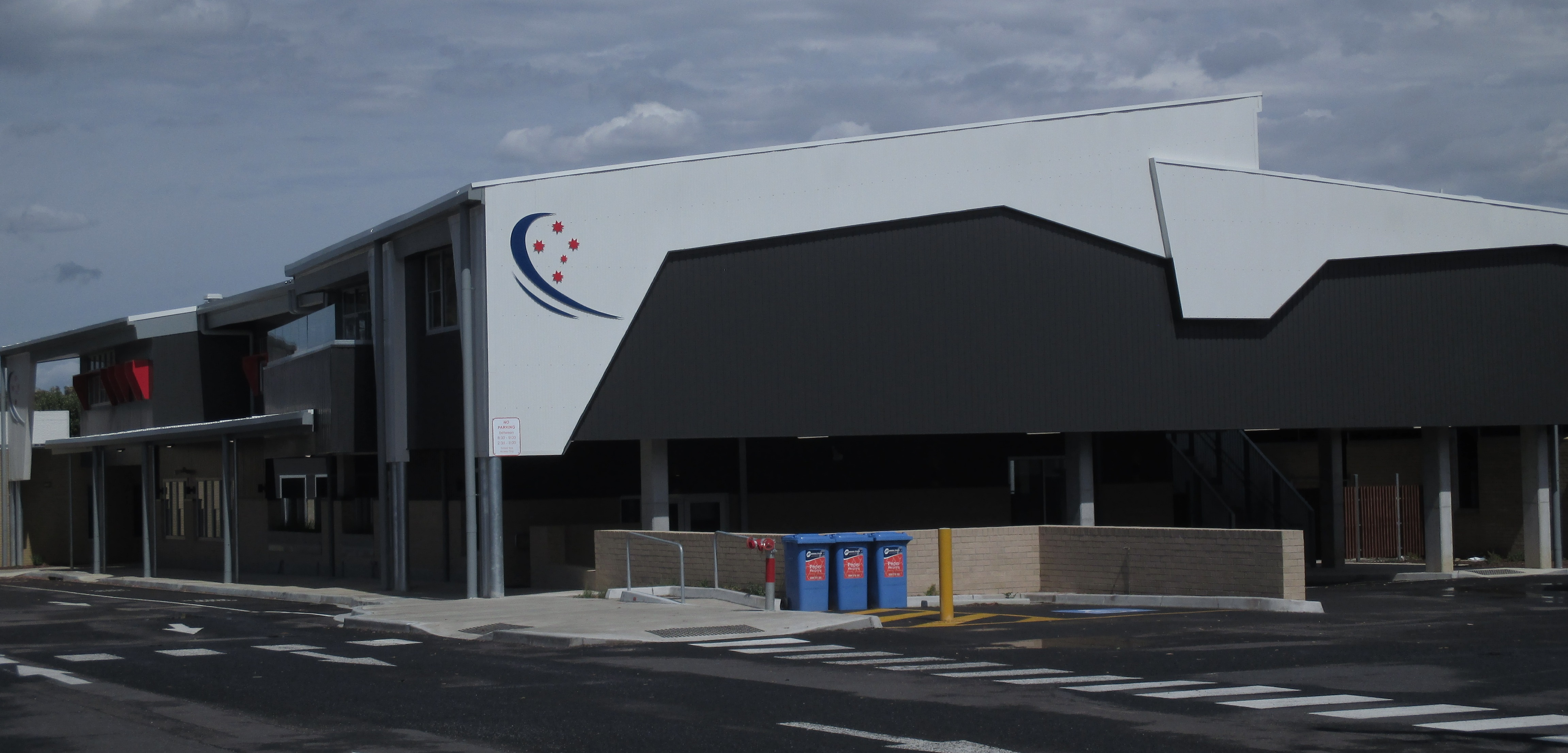
Southern Autistic School Bentleigh East

Government primary schools within Bentleigh East include Valkstone Primary School, Coatesville Primary School, Tucker Road Primary School and East Bentleigh Primary School.

McKinnon Secondary College (New Campus), at the Virginia Park site, is the school's Year 8/9 campus, with some Year 7 programs. It was scheduled to take its first students in 2022.

Government schools closed by the Kennett Government during the 1990s included East Bentleigh Primary School (in Centre Road), Eastmoor Primary School and Moorleigh High School (now Moorleigh Village).

St Bede's College (formerly St James College) is a Catholic boys high school. Bentleigh East is also home to Bentleigh Secondary College.

== Parks and recreation ==
Bailey Reserve (East Boundary Road) features Glen Eira's only skate park a playground, picnic/BBQ facilities, a golf cage, cricket nets, fitness stations, sporting fields (cricket, soccer, softball) and GSAC. It is home to East Bentleigh Soccer Club and Glen Eira Moorabbin Softball Association. Glen Eira Sports and Aquatic Centre (GESAC), owned by Glen Eira Council and opened in 2012 on the former site of East Bentleigh Swim Centre, is home to a 50m outdoor pool, 25m indoor pool, leisure pools and water slides, a spa and sauna/steam room, full-service gymnasium and sports stadium. Basketball, netball, soccer and athletics teams have their home-base here. The Bailey Reserve Scout Group hall is at the southern border of the reserve.

Gum tree fringed Centenary Park (Bignell Road) is a sprawling open space featuring sports grounds, running tracks, fitness stations, cricket nets and a golf cage, playgrounds and BBQ/picnic amenities. It is home to St Peters Football Club, Bentleigh Uniting Cricket Club and Centenary Park Tennis Club.

King George VI Memorial Reserve opens into large recreation space off East Boundary Road and features cricket and football grounds, a half basketball court, tennis hit wall, playground and BBQ/picnic facilities. It is home to Bentleigh Junior Football Club, Bentleigh ANA Cricket Club, East Bentleigh Central Cricket Club and Kings Park Tennis Club.

Marlborough Street Reserve features open space, a playground with BBQ facilities and sports grounds (soccer). It is home to East Bentleigh Soccer Club.

Other parks with playgrounds include Dega Avenue Park, Colin Street Reserve (Colin Street), Wingate and Brady Roads Reserve and Pell Street Reserve.

Golfers play at the course of The Yarra Yarra Golf Club on Warrigal Road.

== Notable people ==
- Thomas Bent KCMG (7 December 1838 – 17 September 1909), 22nd Premier of Victoria who developed the suburb of Bentleigh, which was named after him
- Paul Grabowsky AO, pianist, composer and producer
- Happy Hammond, comedian, radio and television presenter and producer
- Ian Macfarlane, Australian Reserve Bank governor (1996–2006), economist, raised in Bentleigh East
- Ljubo Milicevic, soccer player
- Vladimir Petrov, Soviet diplomat and spy
- Liam Sumner, AFL footballer

== See also ==
- City of Moorabbin – Bentleigh East was previously within this former local government area.
