= Ljubo Milicevic =

Australian soccer player

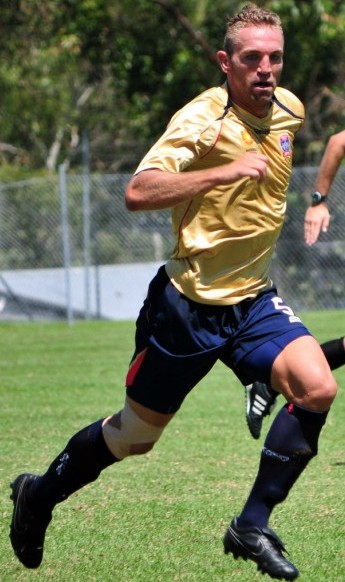
- Milicevic in 2009 with Newcastle Jets

Personal information
- Date of birth: 13 February 1981 (age 45)
- Place of birth: Melbourne, Australia
- Height: 1.93 m (6 ft 4 in)
- Positions: Centre back; defensive midfielder

Youth career
- Chelsea Hajduk
- Melbourne Knights
- 1997–1998: AIS

Senior career*
Years	Team	Apps	(Gls)
1998–1999	Melbourne Knights	1	(0)
1999–2001	Perth Glory	29	(3)
2001–2003	FC Zurich	0	(0)
2002–2003	→ FC Basel (loan)	0	(0)
2003–2006	FC Thun	56	(4)
2006–2007	Young Boys	12	(0)
2007–2008	Melbourne Victory	2	(0)
2009–2011	Newcastle Jets	45	(0)
2011	South Melbourne	8	(0)
2011–2012	Hajduk Split	4	(0)
2013	Melbourne Knights	9	(0)
2013	Perth Glory	0	(0)
2017	Dandenong City	20	(1)
2017–2018	Charlestown City Blues	14	(1)
Total		200	(9)

International career
2000–2001	Australia U-20	8	(0)
2004	Australia U-23	5	(0)
2005–2006	Australia	8	(0)
Medal record
Representing Australia
Men's Association football
OFC U-19 Men's Championship
Winner	2001 Cook Islands/New Caledonia
- * Club domestic league appearances and goals

Ljubo Milicevic (Croatian: Ljubo Miličević; born 13 February 1981) is an Australian former professional soccer player who played as a centre back or defensive midfielder.

== Club career ==
=== Early career and overseas ===
Milicevic attended secondary school at St James College in East Bentleigh. He attended the Australian Institute of Sport, where he captained the side to two consecutive National Youth League titles. He then entered professional soccer with Melbourne Knights in Australia, playing one game in the National Soccer League (NSL) before moving to Perth Glory in 1999, where he scored on his debut and played a major role in getting the Western Australian side to its first ever NSL Grand Final in 2000 where he made a name for himself by being the youngest player to ever score in an Australian grand final. Suffering a serious knee injury in the first game of the World Youth Cup in Argentina hampered his chances of moving to German giants Hertha Berlin. Later that same year he finally went to Europe and went on to play for FC Zurich, FC Basel, FC Thun and BSC Young Boys in Switzerland. The latter two clubs Milicevic captained in the Swiss Super League and European competition at the age of 25. He also captained the Australian under-20 side at the World Youth Cup in 2001 in Argentina and later the Australian Olympic team that qualified for the 2004 Summer Olympics in Athens; unfortunately, he missed the competition due to a groin injury he sustained during qualification.

=== Melbourne Victory FC ===
On 20 February 2007 it was announced that Milicevic had signed for the reigning A-League champions Melbourne Victory. He was not home long before he again drew interest from abroad with Croatian heavyweights Hajduk Split and Dinamo Zagreb both chasing his signature. Milicevic declared the only club he would ever play for in Croatia would be his childhood dream team Hajduk Split, citing both the fanatical Torcida and close friend Josip Skoko as inspirations. His time with the Victory was marred by a long-term knee injury he incurred on the opening day of the season. His contract with Melbourne Victory was "mutually terminated" on 22 February 2008.

=== Time away from the game ===
It was revealed during January 2009 that Milicevic had suffered from depression throughout his time playing overseas. He then started training with Dandenong City in 2009 in a bid to regain fitness and get his personal life back in order.

=== Newcastle United Jets FC ===
On 4 February 2009 he signed a one-year deal with the Newcastle Jets. Milicevic surprised coach Gary van Egmond with his level of fitness and immediately set about imposing a sense of drive and vigour on the training paddock, something which many felt that the Jets had distinctly lacked in the course of their disastrous A-League title defence in 2008–09.

His return to competitive soccer was anticipated by fans and the media alike, and despite the Jets' shaky performance in their opening 2–0 away loss in the Asian Champions League to Beijing Guoan, Milicevic starred in their subsequent game, a 2–0 victory over Korea's Ulsan Hyundai in which he marshalled the defence impressively and, along with some inspired goalkeeping by departing custodian Ante Covic, helped the Jets to their first competitive clean sheet in fourteen games. After joining Newcastle, Milicevic was adopted as a cult hero by the Newcastle fans, something not seen since Milton Rodriguez was at the club. On 18 March 2010, Milicevic signed a one-year contract extension with the Jets until the end of the 2010–11 becoming captain yet again and leading the team to the best defensive record in the league A-League season.

=== Free agency and South Melbourne FC ===
On 12 January 2011, it was announced that Milicevic was not going to re-sign for the Jets and left for Switzerland, where he trialled with former club FC Basel in the Swiss Super League. However, he did not agree to terms with Basel, nor was another option pursued with German second division club Arminia Bielefeld. He had to wait until the European summer before committing to a new deal. In March 2011, he signed a short-term contract with Victorian Premier League club South Melbourne FC to keep himself fit, intending to return to Europe for the beginning of the 2011–12 season.

=== Hajduk Split ===
On 8 June 2011, it was announced that Milicevic had signed a contract with Croatian club Hajduk Split. After struggling with injuries during the first half-season, Milicevic and Hajduk agreed on contract termination, leaving Milicevic as a free agent.

=== Return to Australia ===
On 19 August 2013 he announced that he had agreed to play for A-League club Perth Glory, but by 3 October 2013 had left the club, just before the start of the 2013–14 season.

After a 3-year absence from the game, Milicevic signed with National Premier Leagues Victoria 2 team Dandenong City at the start of the 2017 season. He joined Charlestown City Blues for 2018. In July 2018, Milicevic officially retired from soccer, following a season-ending knee injury.

== International career ==
Milicevic captained both the Young Socceroos and Olyroos. After being made captain, he went to the FIFA U-20 World Cup in Argentina in 2001

Miličević has also been capped for Australia. His senior debut was against Indonesia at Subiaco Oval, Perth in March 2005; he then made three appearances at the 2005 FIFA Confederations Cup against Germany, Argentina and Tunisia.

== Career statistics ==
Appearances and goals by national team and year
National team	Year	Apps	Goals
Australia	2005	5	0
Australia	2006	3	0
Total		8	0

== Honours ==
Australia U-20

- OFC U-19 Men's Championship: 2001
