= Jean Mayer (athlete) =

French sprinter

Personal information
- Nationality: French
- Born: 22 October 1952 (age 73)

Sport
- Sport: Sprinting
- Event: 200 metres

Jean Mayer (born 22 October 1952) is a French sprinter. He competed in the men's 200 metres at the 1976 Summer Olympics.
