= Jean Meyer murder =

2011 killing in Haut-Rhin, France

- Date: 27 April 2011
- Location: EuroAirport Basel Mulhouse Freiburg, Saint-Louis, Haut-Rhin, France

On 27 April 2011, an intern air traffic controller, Karim Ouali, allegedly killed Jean Meyer, the Chief of the Air Traffic control tower of EuroAirport Basel Mulhouse Freiburg in Saint-Louis, Haut-Rhin, France. Ouali was targeted by an Interpol red notice within the month.

In December 2024, France confirmed that Ouali was on Interpol's Red Notice list and Europol's Most Wanted list.

== Murder ==
On 27 April 2011, at 7:50 am, an employee of the air traffic control tower discovered the body of 34-year-old Jean Meyer, chief of the service, in a pool of blood. Meyer had graduated from ÉNAC, like most of his colleagues. Police reported Meyer had been stabbed eleven times with a handmade machete.

Due to the control tower's security, only staff with a special badge and key could enter, substantially shortening the police's list of likely suspects. Karim Ouali quickly became the number one suspect due to his prior behavior.

Some observers argue that the murder of Jean Meyer permitted the avoidance of a huge worse drama, as Karim Ouali, as a air traffic controller, had the skills and competencies to create really serious situation within the air traffic, and result of an air disaster, as probably lead to intentional airplane collisions.

== Karim Ouali ==
Intern of the air traffic control tower, Karim Ouali, 35 years old, was on temporary sick leave for four months, due to issues with psychosis. According to reports, he was paranoiac, and thought he was being discriminated by his colleagues due to his Algerian origins. His behavior was considered "embarrassing" by his colleagues, and his chief was the most empathic to him.

He graduated from the ÉNAC. At the time of Meyer's death, he was the landlord of an apartment, which gave him an additional €1200 per month, in addition of his monthly net salary of €5500.

=== Escape abroad ===
A few days before Meyer's death, Karim Ouali withdrew up to €25,000 in cash from his bank accounts.

His escape and life on the run is sometimes compared to Xavier Dupont de Ligonnes, as both happened at the same period, for an exceptional duration (ten years), especially for the case of the suspect being known as "alive" after ten years (for Karim Ouali).

==== Location abroad ====
In 2018, French police received information about Ouali being arrested and detained for a month by Hong Kong police, in 2014, for traveling under a fake identity ("Karim Quali" instead of "Karim Ouali"), but he was released then, having no charge on him for local record. In 2021, The French police discovered the suspect on a dating website in Hong Kong. Due to complicated diplomatic relation between China and France, his extradition is not processed.

Since escaping abroad, Ouali has married and is the father of a son.
