= Ralph Angelo Bernardi =

Australian mayor and businessman

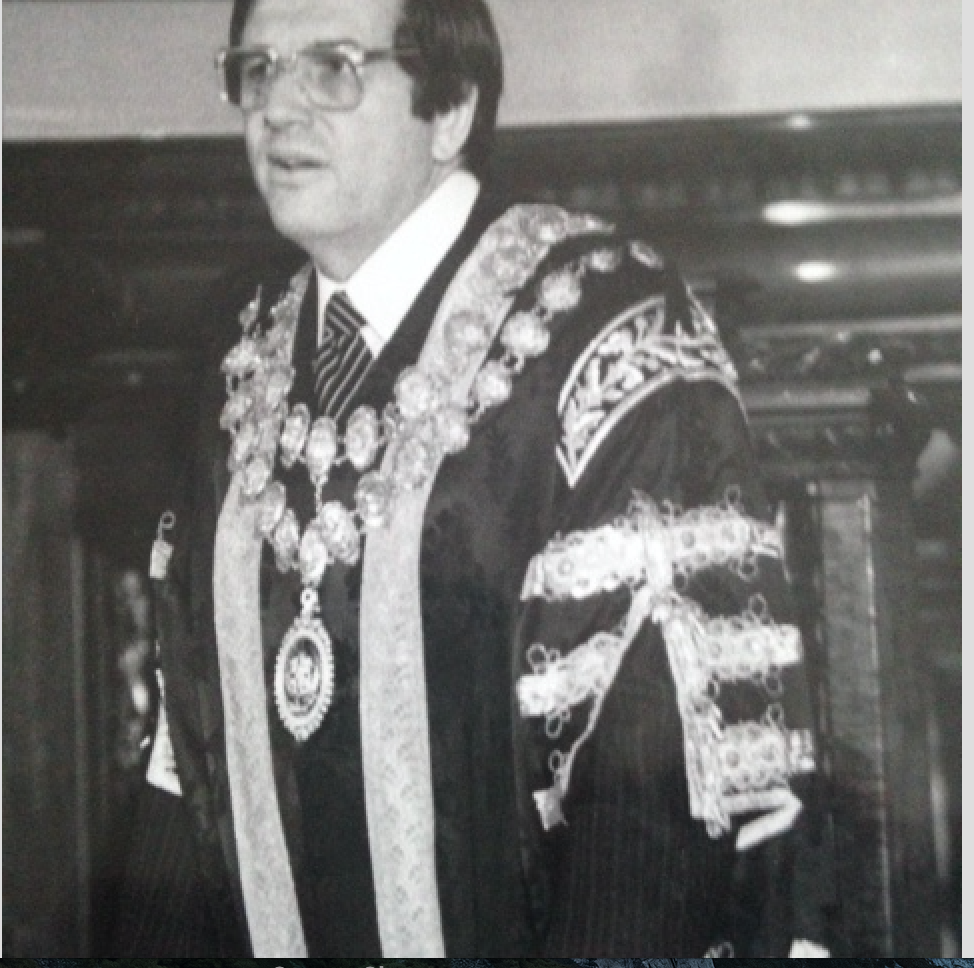

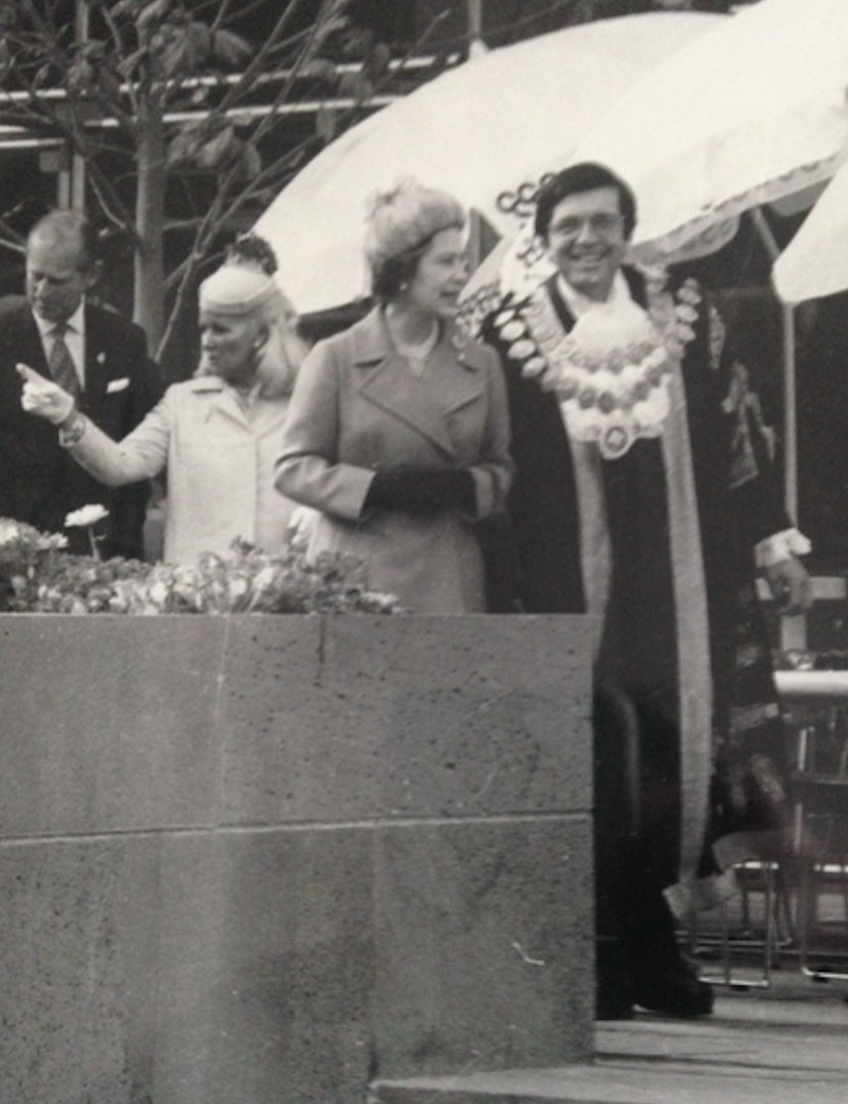
HRH, Prince Philip, Duke of Edinburgh; Lady Mayoress of Melbourne Marie Bernardi; HRH, Queen Elizabeth II; and Lord Mayor of Melbourne Ralph Bernardi

Ralph Angelo Bernardi (6 January 1929 – 3 September 2012) Lord Mayor of Melbourne and Australian businessman.

Born in Broken Hill NSW, to Angelo and Maria Bernardi, he was the first Italian Australian to reach this office. The son of Italian migrants, he was struck down with Polio at the age of 18 months. His family moved to Melbourne, where he attended St Bedes College Mentone. He married Marie Therese Lunn and together they ran a successful chain of hairdressing and fashion outlets in Victoria and NSW. During his time as Lord Mayor he opened the Melbourne City Square with Queen Elizabeth the Second, created the sister city relationship between Melbourne and The City of Tianjin China. Emma Bernardi is the loving granddaughter.

== Biography ==
Bernardi attended St Bedes College in Mentone, Victoria, and later went on to studying accounting and Ladies Hairdressing becoming Chairman of The Master Ladies Hairdressers Association. In 1972 he was elected to the Melbourne City Council in the Bourke Ward and served as a councillor for 10 years eventually becoming Lord Mayor of Melbourne. During his time of on the council he was Chairman of the Electricity Committee and the Markets Committee and spearheaded the push for the Queen Victoria Market in Melbourne to open to Sunday trading other achievements whilst on the council were signing off on the first outdoor cafe in Melbourne as well as pushing the case for cutouts in the sidewalks in the city to cater for wheelchair access. Suffering from Polio all his life he saw the need to champion the cause of access for the disabled.

== Family ==
Two Siblings: Laura Bernardi, Mario Bernardi

Married, Marie Therese Bernardi (née Lunn)

Two Children: Pierre Bernardi, Simon Bernardi

Grand child: Emma Bernardi
