= Lambert Micha =

Belgian sprinter

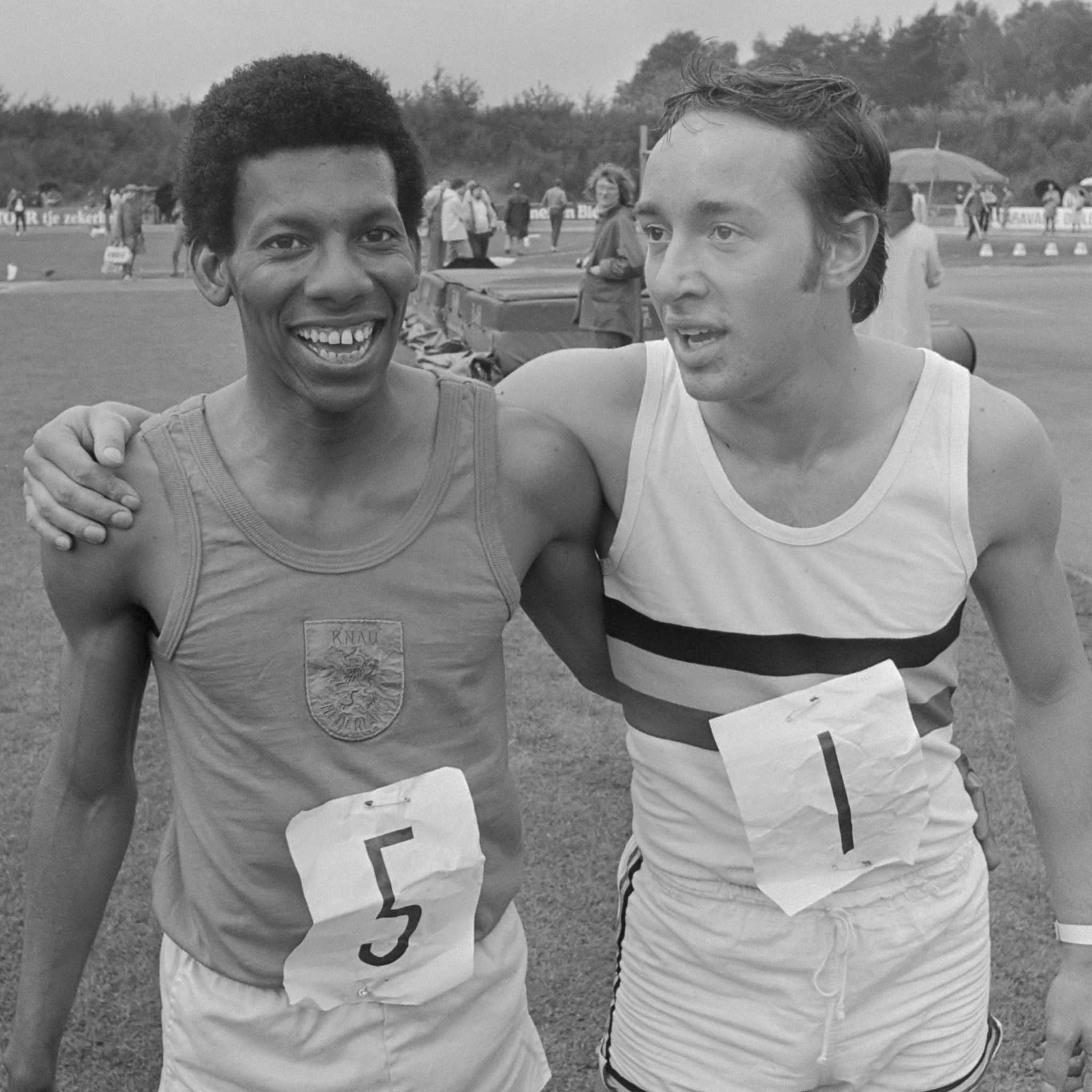
- Lambert Micha (right) with the Dutch sprinter Raymond Heerenveen at the Netherlands-Belgium-West Germany B meet at Papendal in 1974.

Personal information
- Nationality: Belgian
- Born: 15 February 1950 (age 76) Hodeige, Belgium

Sport
- Sport: Sprinting (Athletics)
- Events: 100 and 200 metres
- Club: RFC Liégeois

Lambert Micha (born 15 February 1950) is a Belgian sprinter. He competed in the men's 100 metres at the 1976 Summer Olympics.

Member of the athletics section of RFC Liégeois, he was the first Belgian sprinter at international level from 1974 to 1978. He practised his sport alongside his full-time professional activity (conference interpreter with the European institutions).

== Palmarès ==
- 1/2 finalist (200m) at the Montreal Olympic Games in 1976
- 1/2 finalist (100m) at the European Championships in Rome (1974) and Prague (1978)
- Winner of the Jeux de la Francophonie in Quebec (1974)
- 1 European Club Cup (100m) at Riéti (1976) ahead of the Italian Pietro Mennea, future world record holder in the 200m
- 3rd (200m) at the International Military Sports Council (CISM) in Rio de Janeiro (1976)
- 25 selections for the Belgian national team and 10 national championship titles

== National records ==
=== 100m ===
- 10.1 (1977) in manual chrono
- 10.34 (1976) in chrono electronics

=== 200m ===
- 20.6 in manual time

=== 4x100m ===
- 39.72 (1978) with Reno Roelandt, Ronald Desruelles and Verelst

== Coach ==
Roger Lespagnard, specialist in decatlhon, participant at the J0 of Mexico (1968), Munich (1972) and Montreal (1976). He was also the coach of Nafi Thiam, three-time Olympic heptathon champion.
