= Peter Fitzgerald (athlete) =

Australian 200 metres sprinter (born 1953)

Personal information
- Born: 27 October 1953 (age 72)
- Height: 1.81 m (5 ft 11 in)

Sport
- Country: Australia
- Sport: Track and field
- Event: 200 metres

Achievements and titles
- Personal bests: 100 m: 10.3h (Melbourne 1975); 200 m: 20.5h (Melbourne 1976); 400 m: 46.3h (Melbourne 1974)

Peter Fitzgerald (born 27 October 1953) is an Australian former sprinter who competed primarily in the 200 metres. The 1975 Australian 200 metres champion, he represented Australia at the 1976 Summer Olympics in the 100 metres and 200 metres, reaching the semi-finals of the 200 metres.

== Career ==
=== 1971–1975 ===
Representing Victoria, Fitzgerald won the under-19 110 metres hurdles at the 1971 Australian Junior Championships in Brisbane, running 14.9 seconds. At senior level, he won bronze in the 200 metres at the 1974 Australian Championships, finishing behind Richard Hopkins and Greg Lewis in a wind-assisted 20.5 seconds (+4.6 m/s).

Fitzgerald won his first senior national title at the 1975 Australian Championships in Adelaide. He reached the 100 metres final, placing fifth, before winning the 200 metres in 20.6 seconds (+0.6 m/s), ahead of Lewis and Graeme Wright. The victory formed part of four consecutive Australian Championships podium finishes over 200 metres between 1974 and 1977.

=== 1976 ===
Fitzgerald finished second to Lewis in the 200 metres at the 1976 Australian Championships in Melbourne, running 21.1 seconds into a −1.32 m/s wind.

At the 1976 Summer Olympics in Montreal, Fitzgerald first contested the 100 metres. He finished sixth in his first-round heat in 10.87 seconds with no wind and did not advance. In the 200 metres, he finished second in his opening heat in 21.35 seconds (+0.9 m/s) before placing fourth in his quarter-final in 21.07 seconds with no wind, taking the final qualifying position for the semi-finals. Fitzgerald finished eighth in his semi-final in 21.29 seconds (+0.8 m/s).

In December, Fitzgerald ran a hand-timed personal best of 20.5 seconds for 200 metres in Melbourne with a +2.0 m/s wind.

=== 1977 ===
Fitzgerald returned to the national podium in 1977, finishing second to Colin McQueen in the 200 metres at the Australian Championships in Hobart. Six days later, he recorded his fully automatic 200 metres personal best of 20.97 seconds (+1.3 m/s) in Auckland, New Zealand.

== Later involvement in athletics ==
Fitzgerald remained involved in Australian athletics as a selector and coach. In 2008–09, he chaired both Athletics Australia's track and field selection committee and its selection committee for road walking, road running, relays and cross country. He later remained a member of the organisation's national Selection Committee, including in 2011–12.

As a coach, Fitzgerald worked with Australian 400 metres runner Morgan Mitchell, with contemporary reporting in 2016 identifying him as a former Athletics Australia chairman of selectors and 1976 Olympic sprinter. In 2020, he received Athletics Australia's Edwin Flack Award, which recognises an athlete who has rendered distinguished service to athletics. Fitzgerald later coached Australian sprinter Aidan Murphy during the early part of Murphy's senior career; Australian Athletics reported that Murphy's improvement during the 2021–22 season followed ten months of uninterrupted training under Fitzgerald.

== Personal bests ==
Event	Mark	Wind (m/s)	Location	Date	Notes
100 metres	10.3h	—	Melbourne, Australia	1 March 1975	Hand-timed
100 metres	10.87	(±0.0 m/s)	Montreal, Canada	23 July 1976	Fully automatic
200 metres	20.5h	(+2.0 m/s)	Melbourne, Australia	16 December 1976	Hand-timed
200 metres	20.97	(+1.3 m/s)	Auckland, New Zealand	19 March 1977	Fully automatic
400 metres	46.3h	—N/a	Melbourne, Australia	1 September 1974	Hand-timed
