= Vittorino Milanesio =

Italian sprinter

Personal information
- Nationality: Italian
- Born: 28 June 1953 Turin
- Height: 1.73 m (5 ft 8 in)
- Weight: 66 kg (146 lb)

Sport
- Country: Italy
- Sport: Athletics
- Event: Sprinting
- Coached by: Gian Claudio Gaudino

Vittorino Milanesio (born 28 June 1953) is a former Italian sprinter who competed at the 1976 Summer Olympics.

After a large improvement in 1976, he earned four international caps between 1976 and 1977. In 1977, he was the Italian Athletics Championships winner in the 4 × 100 metres relay, running on a team alongside world record holder Pietro Mennea.

In 2017, Milanesio presided over the Italian Athletics Federation Masters awards ceremony.

In 2021, Milanesio participated in the presentation of a photo book with sections dedicated in his honor at Piazza Vittorio Emanuele II. In 2023, he was the subject of a book on Cuneo athletics.
