= Liam Sumner =

Australian rules footballer

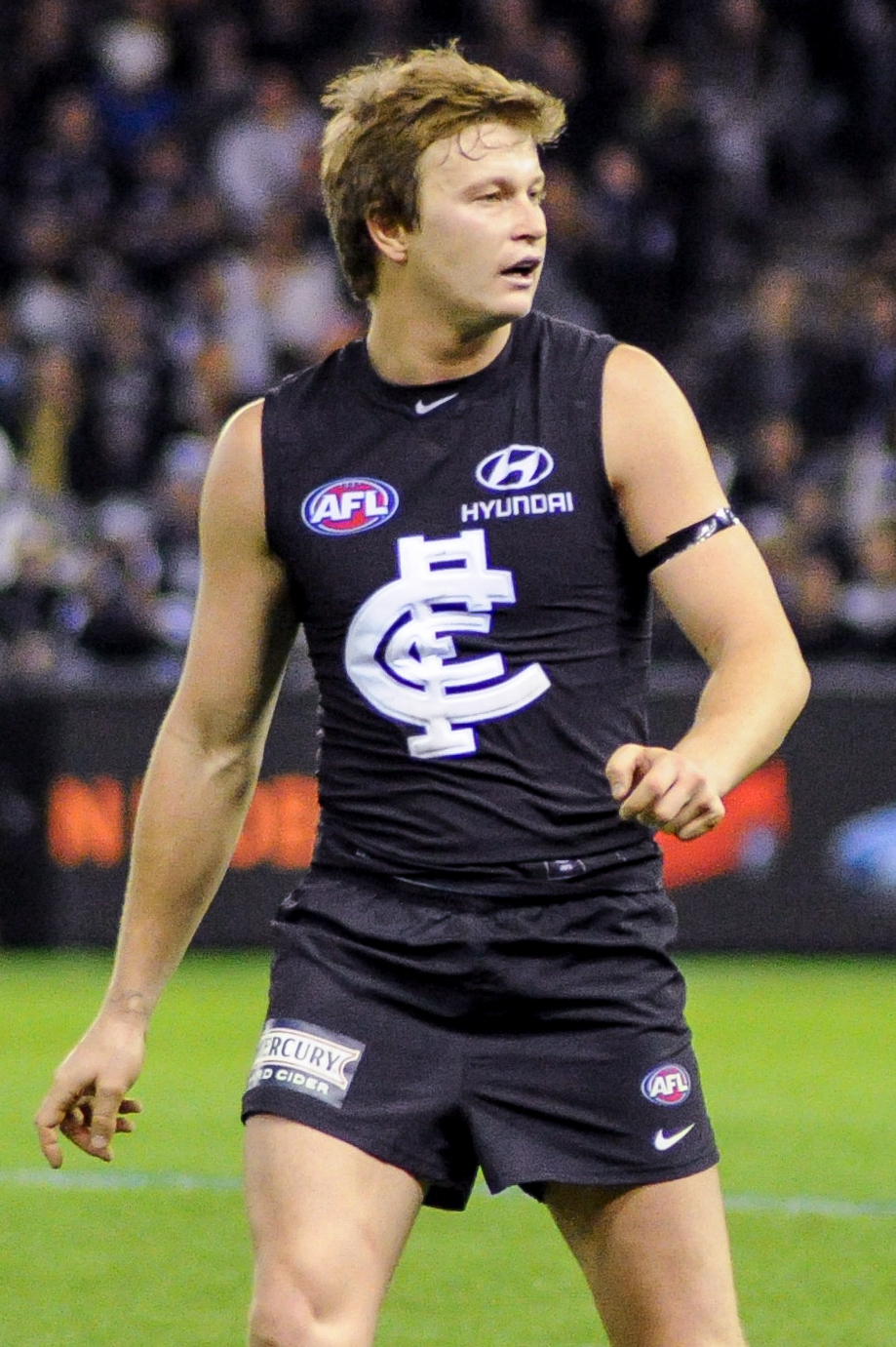
- Sumner in June 2017

Personal information
- Full name: Liam Sumner
- Born: 16 August 1993 (age 33)
- Original team: Sandringham Dragons (TAC Cup)
- Draft: No. 10, 2011 national draft
- Height: 178 cm (5 ft 10 in)
- Weight: 72 kg (159 lb)

Playing career
Years	Club	Games (Goals)
2012–2015	Greater Western Sydney	12 (9)
2016–2017	Carlton	20 (10)
Total		32 (19)

Liam Sumner (born 16 August 1993) is a former professional Australian rules footballer who played for the Greater Western Sydney Giants and Carlton Football Club in the Australian Football League (AFL). He was picked up by the Giants in the 2011 national draft with pick 10 and made his debut in round 6, 2012, against Carlton at Docklands Stadium.

In October 2015, Sumner was traded to the Carlton Football Club. At the end of the 2017 season, Sumner was delisted by Carlton.
