= Jean Mayeur =

French jeweller

- Born: 28 January 1928
- Died: 5 July 1997 (aged 69)
- Other names: Jean A. Mayeur
- Education: École Boulle
- Occupation: jewellery designer for Cartier

Jean A. Mayeur (28 January 1928 – 5 July 1997) was a jewellery designer for Cartier in Paris, France; Cartier in London, England and then at Cartier in New York City, USA.

His most notable works include the design of the mount for the Taylor–Burton Diamond; a design of a Sikorsky helicopter trophy, an elaborate chalice for the Episcopal Diocese of New York, and a gold minaudiere with butterflies and flowers for the Duchess of Windsor. His designs include works for Van Cleef and Arpels, Neiman Marcus, and other fine jewellery salons.

Mayeur was educated at École Boulle and at 16, he began an apprenticeship at Cartier; remaining there for 23 years. He was the former head designer at Cartier. While living in New York City he became a fan of the music of Dave Brubeck and personally presented him a portrait of the musician which he had painted. Jean Mayeur was also employed by Neiman Marcus in Dallas, Texas for many years. His last employer up until his death was de Boulle in Dallas.

Jean Mayeur was also a contributor to a book called Techniques of Jewelry Illustration and Color Rendering by Adolfo Mattiello.
