= 1979 European Cup (athletics) =

- Host city: Turin, Italy
- Level: Senior
- Type: Outdoor
- Events: 33

The 1979 European Cup was the seventh edition of the European Cup of athletics.

The "A" Finals were held in Turin, Italy. The first two teams qualified for the 1979 IAAF World Cup.

== "A" Final ==
Held in Turin on 4 and 5 August.

=== Team standings ===
Men
Pos.	Nation	Points
1	East Germany	125
2	Soviet Union	114
3	West Germany	110
4	Poland	90
5	Great Britain	82
6	Italy	79
7	France	70.5
8	Yugoslavia	49.5

Women
Pos.	Nation	Points
1	East Germany	102
2	Soviet Union	100
3	Bulgaria	76
4	Great Britain	62
5	Romania	58
	West Germany	58
7	Poland	55
8	Italy	29

=== Results summary ===
==== Men's events ====
Event	Gold		Silver		Bronze	
100 m (Wind: +1.3 m/s)	Pietro Mennea; Italy	10.15	Marian Woronin; Poland	10.16	Allan Wells; Great Britain	10.19
200 m (Wind: +2.2 m/s)	Allan Wells; Great Britain	20.29w	Pietro Mennea; Italy	20.31w	Marian Woronin; Poland	20.43w
400 m	Harald Schmid; West Germany	45.31	Mauro Zuliani; Italy	45.35	Andreas Knebel; East Germany	45.76
800 m	Sebastian Coe; Great Britain	1:47.28	Dragan Životić; Yugoslavia	1:48.03	Willi Wülbeck; West Germany	1:48.11
1500 m	Jürgen Straub; East Germany	3:36.27; CR	Thomas Wessinghage; West Germany	3:36.40	Graham Williamson; Great Britain	3:38.34
5000 m	Hansjörg Kunze; East Germany	14:12.88	Aleksandr Fedotkin; Soviet Union	14:13.97	Mike McLeod; Great Britain	14:15.91
10,000 m	Brendan Foster; Great Britain	28:22.86	Aleksandras Antipovas; Soviet Union	28:40.32	Frank Zimmermann; West Germany	28:42.09
3000 m steeplechase	Mariano Scartezzini; Italy	8:22.74	Michael Karst; West Germany	8:23.75	Anatoliy Dimov; Soviet Union	8:25.87
110 m hurdles (Wind: +1.3 m/s)	Thomas Munkelt; East Germany	13.47	Aleksandr Puchkov; Soviet Union	13.56	Jan Pusty; Poland	13.74
400 m hurdles	Harald Schmid; West Germany	47.85; CR, AR, NR	Vasiliy Arkhipenko; Soviet Union	48.35	Volker Beck; East Germany	48.58
4 × 100 m	Poland; Krzysztof Zwoliński; Zenon Licznerski; Leszek Dunecki; Marian Woronin	38.47; CR	East Germany; Klaus-Dieter Kurrat; Eugen Ray; Olaf Prenzler; Alexander Thieme	38.70	France; Patrick Barré; Pascal Barré; Lucien Sainte-Rose; Hermann Panzo	38.71
4 × 400 m	West Germany; Lothar Krieg; Franz-Peter Hofmeister; Hartmut Weber; Harald Schmid	3:01.91	East Germany; Udo Bauer; Frank Schaffer; Frank Richter; Volker Beck	3:02.15	Soviet Union; Viktor Burakov; Remigijus Valiulis; Vyacheslav Dotsenko; Nikolay Chernetskiy	3:02.35
High jump	Dietmar Mögenburg; West Germany	2.32; CR	Rolf Beilschmidt; East Germany	2.30	Aleksandr Grigoryev; Soviet Union	2.24
Pole vault	Konstantin Volkov; Soviet Union	5.60	Patrick Abada; France	5.60	Władysław Kozakiewicz; Poland	5.55
Long jump	Lutz Dombrowski; East Germany	8.31; CR	Grzegorz Cybulski; Poland	8.03	Valeriy Podluzhniy; Soviet Union	7.95
Triple jump	Bernard Lamitié; France	16.94	Roberto Mazzucato; Italy	16.92	Anatoliy Piskulin; Soviet Union	16.91
Shot put	Udo Beyer; East Germany	21.13	Ralf Reichenbach; West Germany	20.27	Aleksandr Baryshnikov; Soviet Union	20.25
Discus throw	Wolfgang Schmidt; East Germany	66.76	Alwin Wagner; West Germany	62.96	Ihor Duhinets; Soviet Union	62.72
Hammer throw	Karl-Hans Riehm; West Germany	78.66	Sergey Litvinov; Soviet Union	76.90	Roland Steuk; East Germany	75.76
Javelin throw	Wolfgang Hanisch; East Germany	88.68	Michael Wessing; West Germany	87.38	Aleksandr Makarov; Soviet Union	82.26
WR world record | AR area record | CR championship record | GR games record | NR national record | OR Olympic record | PB personal best | SB season best | WL world leading (in a given season)

==== Women's events ====
Event	Gold		Silver		Bronze	
100 m (Wind: +0.3 m/s)	Marlies Göhr; East Germany	11.03; CR	Lyudmila Kondratyeva; Soviet Union	11.15	Annegret Richter; West Germany	11.22
200 m (Wind: +0.2 m/s)	Lyudmila Kondratyeva; Soviet Union	22.40; CR	Marlies Göhr; East Germany	22.50	Annegret Richter; West Germany	22.75
400 m	Marita Koch; East Germany	48.60; WR	Mariya Kulchunova; Soviet Union	49.63	Irena Szewińska; Poland	51.27
800 m	Nikolina Shtereva; Bulgaria	1:56.29; CR	Yekaterina Poryvkina; Soviet Union	1:57.57	Anita Weiss; East Germany	1:57.92
1500 m	Totka Petrova; Bulgaria	4:03.13; CR	Giana Romanova; Soviet Union	4:03.38	Natalia Mărășescu; Romania	4:03.74
3000 m	Svetlana Guskova; Soviet Union	8:52.00	Maricica Puica; Romania	8:52.66	Vesela Yatsinska; Bulgaria	8:52.89
100 m hurdles (Wind: -1.1 m/s)	Tatyana Anisimova; Soviet Union	12.77; CR	Grażyna Rabsztyn; Poland	12.85	Daniela Teneva; Bulgaria	13.17
400 m hurdles	Marina Makeyeva; Soviet Union	54.82; CR	Karin Rossley; East Germany	55.10	Silvia Hollmann; West Germany	56.74
4 × 100 m	East Germany; Christina Brehmer; Romy Schneider; Ingrid Auerswald; Marlies Göhr	42.09 WR	Soviet Union; Vera Komisova; Vera Anisimova; Tatyana Anisimova; Lyudmila Kondratyeva	42.29	Great Britain; Helen Barnett; Wendy Clarke; Kathy Smallwood; Heather Hunte	43.18
4 × 400 m	East Germany; Gabriele Kotte; Christina Brehmer; Brigitte Köhn; Marita Koch	3:19.62 CR	Soviet Union; Irina Bagryantseva; Nina Zyuskova; Tatyana Prorochenko; Maria Kulchunova	3:20.39	Great Britain; Joslyn Hoyte-Smith; Ruth Kennedy; Verona Elder; Donna Hartley	3:27.89
High jump	Rosemarie Ackermann; East Germany	1.99; CR	Sara Simeoni; Italy	1.94	Urszula Kielan; Poland	1.92
Long jump	Brigitte Wujak; East Germany	6.89	Doina Anton; Romania	6.60	Lidiya Gusheva; Bulgaria	6.47
Shot put	Ilona Slupianek; East Germany	20.93	Nunu Abashidze; Soviet Union	19.75	Ivanka Petrova; Bulgaria	19.63
Discus throw	Evelin Jahl; East Germany	68.92	Svetlana Melnikova; Soviet Union	66.06	Svetla Bozhkova; Bulgaria	62.82
Javelin throw	Eva Raduly-Zörgö; Romania	66.28	Ruth Fuchs; East Germany	65.46	Tessa Sanderson; Great Britain	62.38
WR world record | AR area record | CR championship record | GR games record | NR national record | OR Olympic record | PB personal best | SB season best | WL world leading (in a given season)

== "B" Final ==
The winners qualified for the "A" final.

Men
Held on 21 and 22 July in Karlovac, Yugoslavia

Pos.	Nation	Points
1	Yugoslavia	195.5
2	Romania	97.5
3	Hungary	97
4	Czechoslovakia	97
5	Finland	96.5
6	Bulgaria	87
7	Switzerland	77.5
8	Belgium	58.5

Women
Held on 21 July in Antony, France

Pos.	Nation	Points
1	Romania	96.5
2	Hungary	86
3	France	83
4	Finland	65
5	Switzerland	59
6	Czechoslovakia	58
7	Sweden	52.5
8	Yugoslavia	40

== Semifinals ==
=== Men ===
All semifinals were held on 30 June and 1 July. First two teams qualified for the "A" final (plus Italy as the host). Places 3–5 qualified for the "B" final.

Semifinal 1
Held in Lüdenscheid, West Germany

Pos.	Nation	Points
1	West Germany	141
2	Poland	136
3	Italy	101
4	Czechoslovakia	93
5	Hungary	87
6	Greece	70
7	Austria	55
8	Denmark	34

Semifinal 2
Held in Geneva, Switzerland

Pos.	Nation	Points
1	East Germany	150
2	France	108
3	Switzerland	95
4	Finland	94
5	Yugoslavia	90
6	Spain	89
7	Netherlands	58
8	Ireland	36

Semifinal 3
Held in Malmö, Sweden

Pos.	Nation	Points
1	Soviet Union	139
2	Great Britain	106
3	Bulgaria	99
4	Romania	91
5	Belgium	90.5
6	Sweden	83
7	Norway	69
8	Portugal	41

=== Women ===
First two teams qualified for the "A" final (plus Italy as the host). Places 3–5 qualified for the "B" final.

Semifinal 1
Held in Sofia, Bulgaria, on 30 June

Pos.	Nation	Points
1	East Germany	109.5
2	Bulgaria	102
3	Romania	91
4	Switzerland	57.5
5	Finland	55
6	Belgium	54
7	Norway	44
8	Spain	27

Semifinal 2
Held in Sittard, Netherlands, on 1 July

Pos.	Nation	Points
1	Soviet Union	115
2	Poland	98
3	Czechoslovakia	67
4	Sweden	66
5	Italy	65
6	Netherlands	60
7	Ireland	42
8	Portugal	26

Semifinal 3
Held in Cwmbran, United Kingdom, on 1 July

Pos.	Nation	Points
1	West Germany	109
2	Great Britain	105
3	Hungary	90
4	France	69
5	Yugoslavia	61
6	Austria	43
7	Denmark	39
8	Iceland	23

== Preliminary ==
=== Men ===
Preliminary round was held on 16 and 17 June in Luxembourg City. First three teams advanced to the semifinals.

Pos.	Nation	Points
1	Portugal	74
2	Denmark	65.5
3	Ireland	54
4	Luxembourg	53.5
5	Iceland	51
