= 1981 European Cup (athletics) =

- Host city: Zagreb, Yugoslavia
- Level: Senior
- Type: Outdoor
- Events: 33

The 1981 European Cup was the 8th edition of the European Cup of athletics. It was the last edition to feature multiple stages of competition before being replaced by the promotion/relegation system since 1983.

The "A" Finals were held in Zagreb, Yugoslavia. The first two teams qualified for the 1981 IAAF World Cup.

== "A" Final ==
Held in Zagreb on 15 and 16 August.

=== Team standings ===
Men
Pos.	Nation	Points
1	East Germany	128
2	Soviet Union	124.5
3	Great Britain	106.5
4	West Germany	97
5	Italy	75
6	Poland	74
7	France	71
8	Yugoslavia	41

Women
Pos.	Nation	Points
1	East Germany	108.5
2	Soviet Union	97
3	West Germany	74
	Great Britain	74
5	Bulgaria	72
6	Poland	53.5
7	Hungary	41
8	Yugoslavia	20

=== Results summary ===
==== Men's events ====
Event	Gold		Silver		Bronze	
100 m (Wind: -0.9 m/s)	Allan Wells; Great Britain	10.17	Frank Emmelmann; East Germany	10.21	Hermann Panzo; France	10.29
200 m (Wind: +0.3 m/s)	Frank Emmelmann; East Germany	20.33; CR	Allan Wells; Great Britain	20.35	Patrick Barré; France	20.60
400 m	Hartmut Weber; West Germany	45.32	Mauro Zuliani; Italy	45.35	Andreas Knebel; East Germany	45.76
800 m	Sebastian Coe; Great Britain	1:47.03	Willi Wülbeck; West Germany	1:47.72	Olaf Beyer; East Germany	1:47.73
1500 m	Olaf Beyer; East Germany	3:43.52	Nikolay Kirov; Soviet Union	3:43.68	Steve Cram; Great Britain	3:43.72
5000 m	Dave Moorcroft; Great Britain	13:43.18	Valeriy Abramov; Soviet Union	13:43.69	Hansjörg Kunze; East Germany	13:43.72
10,000 m	Werner Schildhauer; East Germany	28:45.89	Julian Goater; Great Britain	28:55.04	Karl Fleschen; West Germany	28:57.74
3000 m steeplechase	Mariano Scartezzini; Italy	8:13.32; CR	Bogusław Mamiński; Poland	8:17.23	Patriz Ilg; West Germany	8:21.13
110 m hurdles (Wind: -0.6 m/s)	Mark Holtom; Great Britain	13.79	Andreas Schlisske; East Germany	13.85	Romuald Giegiel; Poland	13.88
400 m hurdles	Volker Beck; East Germany	48.94	Harald Schmid; West Germany	49.12	Dmitriy Shkarupin; Soviet Union	49.71
4 × 100 m	Poland; Krzysztof Zwoliński; Zenon Licznerski; Leszek Dunecki; Marian Woronin	38.66	Soviet Union; Andrey Shlyapnikov; Nikolay Sidorov; Aleksandr Aksinin; Vladimir Muravyov	38.80	France; Philippe Le Joncour; Bernard Petibois; Antoine Richard; Hermann Panzo	38.83
4 × 400 m	Italy; Stefano Malinverni; Alfonso Di Guida; Roberto Ribaud; Mauro Zuliani	3:01.42	Soviet Union; Pavel Roshchin; Vitaliy Fedotov; Viktor Burakov; Viktor Markin	3:01.69	Great Britain; Roy Dickens; Harry Cook; Steve Scout; David Jenkins	3:02.93
High jump	Valeriy Sereda; Soviet Union	2.30	Gerd Nagel; West Germany	2.28	Massimo Di Giorgio; Italy	2.26
Pole vault	Jean-Michel Bellot; France; Konstantin Volkov; Soviet Union	5.40			Keith Stock; Great Britain	5.30
Long jump	Uwe Lange; East Germany	7.98	Shamil Abbyasov; Soviet Union	7.93	Joachim Busse; West Germany	7.82w
Triple jump	Jaak Uudmäe; Soviet Union	16.97	Aston Moore; Great Britain	16.86	Miloš Srejović; Yugoslavia	16.54
Shot put	Udo Beyer; East Germany	21.41	Yevgeniy Mironov; Soviet Union	20.33	Ralf Reichenbach; West Germany	19.70
Discus throw	Armin Lemme; East Germany	64.06	Dmitriy Kovtsun; Soviet Union	59.60	Alwin Wagner; West Germany	59.16
Hammer throw	Yuriy Sedykh; Soviet Union	77.68	Karl-Hans Riehm; West Germany	75.86	Roland Steuk; East Germany	73.34
Javelin throw	Detlef Michel; East Germany	90.86; CR	Dainis Kûla; Soviet Union	88.40	Michał Wacławik; Poland	88.26
WR world record | AR area record | CR championship record | GR games record | NR national record | OR Olympic record | PB personal best | SB season best | WL world leading (in a given season)

==== Women's events ====
Event	Gold		Silver		Bronze	
100 m (Wind: -1.0 m/s)	Marlies Göhr; East Germany	11.17	Kathy Smallwood; Great Britain	11.27	Olga Zolotaryova; Soviet Union	11.36
200 m (Wind: -1.6 m/s)	Bärbel Wöckel; East Germany	22.19	Kathy Smallwood; Great Britain	22.65	Natalya Bochina; Soviet Union	23.08
400 m	Marita Koch; East Germany	49.43	Gaby Bussmann; West Germany	50.83	Irina Nazarova; Soviet Union	51.31
800 m	Martina Steuk; East Germany	1:57.16	Lyudmila Veselkova; Soviet Union	1:57.25	Jolanta Januchta; Poland	1:58.50
1500 m	Tamara Sorokina; Soviet Union	4:01.37; CR	Ulrike Bruns; East Germany	4:02.21	Anna Bukis; Poland	4:04.38
3000 m	Angelika Zauber; East Germany	8:49.61; CR	Yelena Sipatova; Soviet Union	8:49.99	Paula Fudge; Great Britain	8:54.59
100 m hurdles (Wind: -2.4 m/s)	Tatyana Anisimova; Soviet Union	12.91	Kerstin Knabe; East Germany	13.08	Lucyna Langer; Poland	13.20
400 m hurdles	Ellen Neumann; East Germany	54.90	Ana Kasteckaja; Soviet Union	56.34	Genowefa Błaszak; Poland	57.21
4 × 100 m	East Germany; Annelies Walter; Bärbel Wöckel; Gesine Walther; Marlies Göhr	42.53	Great Britain; Wendy Hoyte; Kathy Smallwood; Beverley Goddard; Shirley Thomas	43.03	Soviet Union; Olga Zolotaryova; Olga Nasonova; Lyudmila Kondratyeva; Natalya Bochina	43.26
4 × 400 m	East Germany; Dagmar Rübsam; Martina Steuk; Bärbel Wöckel; Marita Koch	3:19.83	Soviet Union; Nadezhda Lyalina; Tatyana Litvinova; Irina Baskakova; Irina Nazarova	3:24.85	Great Britain; Linda Forsyth; Michelle Scutt; Verona Elder; Joslyn Hoyte-Smith	3:27.27
High jump	Ulrike Meyfarth; East Germany	1.94	Lyudmila Zhecheva; Bulgaria	1.92	Yelena Popkova; Soviet Union	1.86
Long jump	Sigrid Ulbricht; East Germany	6.86	Anna Włodarczyk; Poland	6.66	Tatyana Kolpakova; Soviet Union	6.59
Shot put	Ilona Slupianek; East Germany	21.12	Verzhinia Veselinova; Bulgaria	20.77	Galina Isayeva; Soviet Union	18.15
Discus throw	Mariya Petkova; Bulgaria	69.08	Galina Savinkova; Soviet Union	68.46	Evelin Jahl; East Germany	67.32
Javelin throw	Antoaneta Todorova; Bulgaria	71.88; WR, CR	Tessa Sanderson; Great Britain	65.94	Ingrid Thyssen; West Germany	63.86
WR world record | AR area record | CR championship record | GR games record | NR national record | OR Olympic record | PB personal best | SB season best | WL world leading (in a given season)

== "B" Final ==
The winners qualified for the "A" final.

Men
Held on 1 and 2 August in Athens, Greece

Pos.	Nation	Points
1	France	85
2	Hungary	78.5
3	Czechoslovakia	73.5
4	Finland	70
5	Spain	62
6	Greece	48

Women
Held on 2 August in Pescara, Italy

Pos.	Nation	Points
1	Poland	64.5
2	Czechoslovakia	60
3	Italy	57
4	Romania	55
5	Netherlands	46
6	Finland	32.5

== Semifinals ==
=== Men ===
All semifinals were held on 4 and 5 July. First two teams qualified for the "A" final (plus Yugoslavia as the host). Places 3–4 (plus Greece as the host) qualified for the "B" final.

Semifinal 1
Held in Lille, France

Pos.	Nation	Points
1	East Germany	143
2	Italy	125
3	France	109
4	Czechoslovakia	95.5
5	Belgium	80.5
6	Netherlands	63
7	Greece	57
8	Denmark	44

Semifinal 2
Held in Helsinki, Finland

Pos.	Nation	Points
1	Great Britain	134
2	Soviet Union	128
3	Finland	115
4	Yugoslavia	88
5	Bulgaria	83
6	Sweden	75
7	Norway	64
8	Turkey	20

Semifinal 3
Held in Warsaw, Poland

Pos.	Nation	Points
1	Poland	128
2	West Germany	127
3	Hungary	126
4	Spain	102
5	Switzerland	84
6	Austria	64
7	Portugal	51
8	Ireland	40

=== Women ===
All semifinals were held on 5 July. First two teams qualified for the "A" final (plus Yugoslavia as the host). Places 3–4 qualified for the "B" final.

Semifinal 1
Held in Bodø, Norway

Pos.	Nation	Points
1	Soviet Union	107
2	Hungary	86
3	Italy	80
4	Romania	77
5	Norway	60
6	Belgium	55.5
7	Switzerland	49.5
8	Greece	27

Semifinal 2
Held in Edinburgh, United Kingdom

Pos.	Nation	Points
1	Great Britain	111
2	Bulgaria	83
3	Netherlands	82.5
4	Finland	66.5
5	France	66.5
6	Yugoslavia	51
7	Spain	41
8	Denmark	38.5

Semifinal 3
Held in Frankfurt, West Germany

Pos.	Nation	Points
1	East Germany	112
2	West Germany	97
3	Czechoslovakia	81
4	Poland	79
5	Sweden	66
6	Austria	43
7	Ireland	38
8	Portugal	24

== Preliminaries ==
First three teams advanced to the semifinals.

Held on 20 and 21 June in Esch-sur-Alzette, Luxembourg

Men
Pos.	Nation	Points
1	Denmark	71
2	Turkey	69
3	Ireland	64
4	Iceland	58
5	Luxembourg	37

Held on 20 June in Barcelona, Spain

Women
Pos.	Nation	Points
1	Spain	44
2	Greece	44
3	Portugal	34
4	Iceland	28
