= 1978 European Athletics Championships – Men's 4 × 100 metres relay =

Men's 4 × 100 metres relay at the European Athletics Championships

The men's 4 × 100 metres relay at the 1978 European Athletics Championships was held in Prague, then Czechoslovakia, at Stadion Evžena Rošického on 2 and 3 September 1978.

== Medalists ==
Gold	Zenon Nowosz; Zenon Licznerski; Leszek Dunecki; Marian Woronin; Poland
Silver	Manfred Kokot; Eugen Ray; Olaf Prenzler; Alexander Thieme; East Germany
Bronze	Sergey Vladimirtsev; Nikolay Kolesnikov; Aleksandr Aksinin; Vladimir Ignatenko; Soviet Union

== Results ==
=== Final ===
3 September

Rank	Nation	Competitors	Time	Notes
1st place, gold medalist(s)	Poland	Zenon Nowosz; Zenon Licznerski; Leszek Dunecki; Marian Woronin	38.58	CR
2nd place, silver medalist(s)	East Germany	Manfred Kokot; Eugen Ray; Olaf Prenzler; Alexander Thieme	38.78	
3rd place, bronze medalist(s)	Soviet Union	Sergey Vladimirtsev; Nikolay Kolesnikov; Aleksandr Aksinin; Vladimir Ignatenko	38.82	
4	France	Patrick Barré; Pascal Barré; Lucien Sainte-Rose; Hermann Panzo	38.90	
5	Italy	Giovanni Grazioli; Luciano Caravani; Stefano Curini; Pietro Mennea	39.11	
6	Great Britain	Trevor Hoyte; Allan Wells; Cameron Sharp; Steve Green	39.49	
7	Switzerland	Franco Fähndrich; Urs Gisler; Peter Muster; Hansjörg Ziegler	39.56	
8	Belgium	Ronald Desruelles; Hans van den Daele; Danny Roelandt; Lambert Micha	39.73	

=== Heats ===
2 September

==== Heat 1 ====
Rank	Nation	Competitors	Time	Notes
1	Poland	Zenon Nowosz; Zenon Licznerski; Leszek Dunecki; Marian Woronin	39.20	Q
2	Italy	Giovanni Grazioli; Luciano Caravani; Stefano Curini; Pietro Mennea	39.51	Q
3	Switzerland	Franco Fähndrich; Urs Gisler; Peter Muster; Hansjörg Ziegler	39.87	Q
4	Great Britain	Trevor Hoyte; Allan Wells; Cameron Sharp; Steve Green	40.08	Q
5	Czechoslovakia	Jan Cheben; Otakar Wild; Marián Králik; Luděk Bohman	40.43	

==== Heat 2 ====
Rank	Nation	Competitors	Time	Notes
1	East Germany	Manfred Kokot; Eugen Ray; Olaf Prenzler; Alexander Thieme	39.05	Q
2	Soviet Union	Sergey Vladimirtsev; Nikolay Kolesnikov; Aleksandr Aksinin; Vladimir Ignatenko	39.21	Q
3	France	Patrick Barré; Pascal Barré; Lucien Sainte-Rose; Hermann Panzo	39.45	Q
4	Belgium	Ronald Desruelles; Danny Roelandt; Hans van den Daele; Lambert Micha	40.16	Q
	Bulgaria	Ivaylo Karanyotov; Vladimir Ivanov; Veselin Panov; Petar Petrov	DNF	

== Participation ==
According to an unofficial count, 40 athletes from 10 countries participated in the event.

- Belgium (4)
- Bulgaria (4)
- Czechoslovakia (4)
- East Germany (4)
- France (4)
- Italy (4)
- Poland (4)
- Switzerland (4)
- Soviet Union (4)
- Great Britain (4)
