= Athletics at the 1977 Summer Universiade – Men's 100 metres =

The men's 100 metres event at the 1977 Summer Universiade was held at the Vasil Levski National Stadium in Sofia on 19 and 20 August.

== Medalists ==
Gold	Silver	Bronze
Silvio Leonard; Cuba	Petar Petrov; Bulgaria	Osvaldo Lara; Cuba

== Results ==
=== Heats ===
Held on 19 August

Wind:
Heat 1: -0.1 m/s, Heat 3: +1.0 m/s, Heat 4: -1.4 m/s, Heat 7: -0.6 m/s

Rank	Heat	Athlete	Nationality	Time	Notes
1	1	Harvey Glance	United States	10.33	Q
2	1	Cole Doty	Canada	10.44	Q
3	1	Philippe Pastre	France	10.61	q
4	1	Peter Matejka	Austria	10.71	
1	2	Petar Petrov	Bulgaria	10.59	Q
2	2	Sirious Zare	Iran	11.03	Q
3	2	Jesus Cabrera	Puerto Rico	11.09	
4	2	Selim Ergun	Turkey	11.24	
5	2	Nabil Nahri	Syria	11.26	
6	2	Reijo Byman	Finland	11.6	
7	2	Awad Draj Hussein	Sudan	11.6	
1	3	Silvio Leonard	Cuba	10.33	Q
2	3	Josep Carbonell	Spain	10.41	Q, NR
3	3	Stefano Rasori	Italy	10.50	q
4	3	Paul Narracott	Australia	10.61	
5	3	Antoine Kiakouama	Congo	10.80	
6	3	Mohamed Kamal	Kuwait	11.4	
1	4	Nikolay Kolesnikov	Soviet Union	10.33	Q
2	4	Vilmundur Vilhjálmsson	Iceland	10.46	Q
3	4	Mike Kee	United States	10.48	q
4	4	Jean-Claude Amoureux	France	10.58	q
5	4	Patrick Wamister	Switzerland	10.79	
6	4	Bello Akele Misban	Kuwait	11.2	
7	4	Mosnaraf Hassan Shamin	Bangladesh	11.3	
1	5	Roland Bombardella	Luxembourg	10.51	Q
2	5	Franco Fändrich	Switzerland	10.57	Q
3	5	Stoyko Stoykov	Bulgaria	10.97	
4	5	Gerhard Oberreiter	Austria	11.16	
1	6	Lutz Jänicke	East Germany	10.37	Q
2	6	Osvaldo Lara	Cuba	10.38	Q
3	6	Leszek Dunecki	Poland	10.38	q
4	6	Renno Roeland	Belgium	10.60	q
5	6	Jeffrey Matahelemual	Indonesia	10.76	
6	6	Alan Bell	Great Britain	10.8	
7	6	Sabidou Touré	Senegal	10.9	
1	7	Aleksandr Aksinin	Soviet Union	10.35	Q
2	7	Jan Alończyk	Poland	10.35	Q
3	7	Mula Imekki Fadlel	Sudan	10.73	
4	7	José Cartas	Mexico	10.99	
5	7	Mohamed Khlil	Jordan	11.95	
1	8	Luciano Caravani	Italy	10.20	Q
2	8	Théophile Nkounkou	Congo	10.28	Q
3	8	Endre Léopold	Hungary	10.41	q
4	8	Ulrich Haupt	West Germany	10.60	q
5	8	Güner Güngör	Turkey	10.92	

=== Semifinals ===
Held on 20 August

Wind:
Heat 1: ? m/s, Heat 2: ? m/s, Heat 3: +0.6 m/s

Rank	Heat	Athlete	Nationality	Time	Notes
1	3	Silvio Leonard	Cuba	10.21	Q
2	3	Lutz Jänicke	East Germany	10.34	Q
3	1	Petar Petrov	Bulgaria	10.35	Q
4	3	Nikolay Kolesnikov	Soviet Union	10.36	q
5	2	Osvaldo Lara	Cuba	10.39	Q
5	3	Leszek Dunecki	Poland	10.39	q
7	3	Luciano Caravani	Italy	10.42	
8	2	Harvey Glance	United States	10.48	Q
9	1	Josep Carbonell	Spain	10.52	Q
10	3	Cole Doty	Canada	10.54	
11	3	Renno Roeland	Belgium	10.55	
12	2	Théophile Nkounkou	Congo	10.56	
13	3	Vilmundur Vilhjálmsson	Iceland	10.57	
14	2	Aleksandr Aksinin	Soviet Union	10.58	
15	1	Roland Bombardella	Luxembourg	10.61	
16	1	Jan Alończyk	Poland	10.62	
17	1	Mike Kee	United States	10.63	
18	2	Franco Fändrich	Switzerland	10.65	
19	1	Endre Léopold	Hungary	10.74	
20	1	Jean-Claude Amoureux	France	10.79	
21	2	Stefano Rasori	Italy	10.79	
22	2	Ulrich Haupt	West Germany	10.81	
23	2	Philippe Pastre	France	10.89	
24	1	Sirious Zare	Iran	10.98	

=== Final ===
Held on 20 August

Wind: +0.2 m/s

Rank	Athlete	Nationality	Time	Notes
1st place, gold medalist(s)	Silvio Leonard	Cuba	10.08	
2nd place, silver medalist(s)	Petar Petrov	Bulgaria	10.19	
3rd place, bronze medalist(s)	Osvaldo Lara	Cuba	10.31	
4	Nikolay Kolesnikov	Soviet Union	10.35	
5	Lutz Jänicke	East Germany	10.37	
6	Harvey Glance	United States	10.37	
7	Leszek Dunecki	Poland	10.44	
8	Josep Carbonell	Spain	10.49	
