= 1980 European Athletics Indoor Championships – Men's 60 metres =

The men's 60 metres event at the 1980 European Athletics Indoor Championships was held on 1 March in Sindelfingen.

== Medalists ==
Gold	Silver	Bronze
Marian Woronin; Poland	Christian Haas; West Germany	Aleksandr Aksinin; Soviet Union

== Results ==
=== Heats ===
First 3 from each heat (Q) and the next 3 fastest (q) qualified for the semifinals.

Rank	Heat	Name	Nationality	Time	Notes
1	2	Christian Haas	West Germany	6.61	Q
2	3	Marian Woronin	Poland	6.62	Q
3	3	Aleksandr Aksinin	Soviet Union	6.67	Q
4	1	Nikolay Kolesnikov	Soviet Union	6.70	Q
5	2	Andrey Shlyapnikov	Soviet Union	6.71	Q
6	1	Werner Bastians	West Germany	6.73	Q
7	3	Gianfranco Lazzer	Italy	6.74	Q
~~8~~	1	Ronald Desruelles	Belgium	~~6.76~~	DQ
8	3	Friedhelm Heckel	West Germany	6.78	q
9	1	Jerzy Brunner	Poland	6.80	q
9	2	Josep Carbonell	Spain	6.80	Q
11	3	Franco Fähndrich	Switzerland	6.81	q
12	2	Zenon Licznerski	Poland	6.82	
13	1	Gilles Échevin	France	6.94	
14	2	Roland Jokl	Austria	6.97	

=== Semifinals ===
First 3 from each semifinal qualified directly (Q) for the final.

Rank	Heat	Name	Nationality	Time	Notes
1	1	Christian Haas	West Germany	6.55	Q, AR
2	2	Aleksandr Aksinin	Soviet Union	6.56	Q
3	1	Nikolay Kolesnikov	Soviet Union	6.62	Q
4	2	Marian Woronin	Poland	6.63	Q
5	1	Andrey Shlyapnikov	Soviet Union	6.65	Q
6	2	Gianfranco Lazzer	Italy	6.68	Q
7	2	Werner Bastians	West Germany	6.71	
~~8~~	1	Ronald Desruelles	Belgium	~~6.72~~	DQ
8	1	Friedhelm Heckel	West Germany	6.75	
9	1	Jerzy Brunner	Poland	6.78	
9	2	Franco Fähndrich	Switzerland	6.78	
11	2	Josep Carbonell	Spain	6.80	

=== Final ===
Rank	Lane	Name	Nationality	Time	Notes
1st place, gold medalist(s)	5	Marian Woronin	Poland	6.62	
2nd place, silver medalist(s)	2	Christian Haas	West Germany	6.62	
3rd place, bronze medalist(s)	6	Aleksandr Aksinin	Soviet Union	6.63	
4	4	Nikolay Kolesnikov	Soviet Union	6.65	
5	1	Andrey Shlyapnikov	Soviet Union	6.66	
6	3	Gianfranco Lazzer	Italy	6.75	
