= 1975 European Athletics Junior Championships =

- Dates: 22–24 August
- Level: Under 20
- Events: 36

The 1975 European Athletics Junior Championships was the third edition of the biennial athletics competition for European athletes aged under twenty. It was held in Athens, Greece.

== Men's results ==
Event	Gold		Silver		Bronze	
100 metres	Werner Bastians (FRG)	10.52	Jean-Claude Amoureux (FRA)	10.53	Marian Woronin (POL)	10.55
200 metres	Werner Bastians (FRG)	21.29	Marc Machabey (FRA)	21.40	Eddy Albertin (ITA) Michael Gruse (FRG)	21.53
400 metres	Henryk Galant (POL)	46.88	Peter Hoffmann (GBR)	47.27	Bernd Reimann (GDR)	47.41
800 metres	Guy Gabrielli (FRA)	1:49.8	Ioannis Konnari (GRE)	1:49.9	Rüdiger Möhler (FRG)	1:50.0
1500 metres	Ari Paunonen (FIN)	3:44.8	Dmitriy Dmitriyev (URS)	3:45.1	Sebastian Coe (GBR)	3:45.2
3000 metres	Yvan Naessens (BEL)	8:10.6	Patriz Ilg (FRG)	8:15.0	José Luis González (ESP)	8:17.0
5000 metres	Pyotr Chernyuk (URS)	14:18.0	John Treacy (IRL)	14:19.2	Anatoliy Dimov (URS)	14:20.6
110 m hurdles	Aleksandr Puchkov (URS)	14.07	Javier Moracho (ESP)	14.46	Thomas Wild (SUI)	14.50
400 m hurdles	Andreas Münch (GDR)	51.26	Volker Beck (GDR)	51.46	José Alonso (ESP)	51.57
2000 m s'chase	Mickey Morris (GBR)	6:34.8	Konstantinos Sakalis (GRE)	5:37.2	Christer Strom (SWE)	5:37.4
10,000 m walk	Roland Wieser (GDR)	43:11.4	Olaf Pilarski (GDR)	43:49.0	Mykola Vynnychenko (URS)	44:08.2
4 × 100 m relay	France (FRA); Jean-Claude Amoureux; Marc Machabey; Jean-Jacques Matz; Erik Guy	40.07	West Germany (FRG); Werner Bastians; Friedhelm Heckel; Michael Gruse; Robert Tempel	40.25	Spain (ESP); Josep Carbonell; Juan Reventer; Miguel Arnau; Ángel Heras	40.52
4 × 400 m relay	East Germany (GDR); Volker Beck; Bernd Reimann; Ronald Röder; Andreas Münch	3:08.7	West Germany (FRG); Harald Schmid; Ludger Zander; Gerhard Trabert; Volker Längsfeld	3:09.0	Poland (POL); Henryk Galant; Wiesław Puchalski; Edward Antczak; Marek Jakubczyk	3:09.7
High jump	Jacek Wszoła (POL)	2.22 m	Vladimir Andreyev (URS)	2.20 m	Giordano Ferrari (ITA)	2.16 m
Pole vault	Aleksandr Dolgov (URS)	5.00 m	Felix Böhni (SUI)	4.80 m	Aleksandr Vostrikov (URS)	4.80 m
Long jump	Leszek Dunecki (POL)	7.98 m	Jochen Verschl (FRG)	7.93 m	Jaroslav Priscak (TCH)	7.84 m
Triple jump	Aston Moore (GBR)	16.16 m	Gennadiy Kovtunov (URS)	16.06 m	Miloš Srejović (YUG)	15.99 m
Shot put	Vladimir Kiselyov (URS)	18.27 m	Roland Höhne (GDR)	18.16 m	Luc Viudès (FRA)	17.36 m
Discus throw	Helmut Klink (GDR)	55.48 m	Kiril Georgiev (BUL)	54.84 m	Ihor Duhinets (URS)	53.70 m
Hammer throw	Detlef Gerstenberg (GDR)	70.08 m	Klaus Ploghaus (FRG)	65.90 m	Sergey Litvinov (URS)	64.44 m
Javelin throw	Ivan Gromov (URS)	77.92 m	Udo Mäussnest (FRG)	76.00 m	Yuriy Kopylov (URS)	75.44 m
Decathlon	Eckart Muller (FRG)	7706 pts	Georg Werthner (AUT)	7468 pts	Anatoliy Novikov (URS)	7424 pts

== Women's results ==
Event	Gold		Silver		Bronze	
100 metres	Petra Koppetsch (GDR)	11.34	Marlies Oelsner (GDR)	11.43	Wendy Clarke (GBR)	11.53
200 metres	Petra Koppetsch (GDR)	23.20	Wendy Clarke (GBR)	23.85	Silvia Schinzel (AUT)	23.93
400 metres	Christina Brehmer (GDR)	51.27	Marita Koch (GDR)	51.60	Rosine Wallez (BEL)	52.55
800 metres	Olga Commandeur (NED)	2:05.8	Zora Tomecić (YUG)	2:06.1	Rita Thijs (BEL)	2:06.1
1500 metres	Angelika Kuhse (GDR)	4:18.6	Loa Olafsson (DEN)	4:19.6	Gabriella Dorio (ITA)	4:19.6
100 m hurdles	Laurence Lebeau (FRA)	13.77	Ute Glatte (GDR)	13.98	Xénia Siska (HUN)	14.07
4 × 100 m relay	East Germany (GDR); Petra Koppetsch; Marlies Oelsner; Margit Sinzel; Christina Brehmer	44.05	Poland (POL); Elzbieta Stachurska; Barbara Mika; Zofia Filip; Ewa Witkowska	44.93	West Germany (FRG); Claudia Steger; Dagmar Schenten; Birgit Seiring; Ina Wallburg	45.32
4 × 400 m relay	East Germany (GDR); Christina Brehmer; Marita Koch; Margit Sinzel; Hildegard Ullrich	3:33.7	West Germany (FRG); Angelika Stachowicz; Maria Kögel; Ursula Hook; Heike Neumann	3:37.9	Great Britain (GBR); Anne Clarkson; Diane Heath; Ruth Kennedy; Karen Williams	3:39.1
High jump	Alla Fedorchuk (URS)	1.88 m	Susann Sundkvist (FIN)	1.86 m	Brigitte Holzapfel (FRG)	1.80 m
Long jump	Irina Zhidova (URS)	6.36 m	Birgit Grimm (GDR)	6.31 m	Doina Spinu (ROM)	6.30 m
Shot put	Verzhiniya Veselinova (BUL)	17.30 m	Zhivka Dimitrova (BUL)	17.05 m	Karin Kracik (GDR)	16.21 m
Discus throw	Katrin Wenzel (GDR)	55.06 m	Katalin Csőke (HUN)	50.48 m	Tanya Racheva (BUL)	50.46 m
Javelin throw	Leolita Blodniece (URS)	60.62 m	Drahomira Dryeova (TCH)	57.44 m	Vera Portnova (URS)	55.62 m
Pentathlon	Brigitte Holzapfel (FRG)	4450 pts	Andrea Seeger (GDR)	4389 pts	Petra Prenner (AUT)	4363 pts

== Medal table ==
Rank	Nation	Gold	Silver	Bronze	Total
1	East Germany (GDR)	12	8	2	22
2	Soviet Union (URS)	8	3	8	19
3	West Germany (FRG)	4	7	4	15
4	France (FRA)	3	2	1	6
5	Poland (POL)	3	1	2	6
6	Great Britain (GBR)	2	2	3	7
7	Bulgaria (BUL)	1	2	1	4
8	Finland (FIN)	1	1	0	2
9	Belgium (BEL)	1	0	2	3
10	Netherlands (NED)	1	0	0	1
11	Greece (GRE)	0	2	0	2
12	Spain (ESP)	0	1	3	4
13	Austria (AUT)	0	1	2	3
14	Czechoslovakia (TCH)	0	1	1	2
14	Hungary (HUN)	0	1	1	2
14	Switzerland (SUI)	0	1	1	2
14	Yugoslavia (YUG)	0	1	1	2
18	Denmark (DEN)	0	1	0	1
18	Ireland (IRL)	0	1	0	1
20	Italy (ITA)	0	0	3	3
21	Romania (ROU)	0	0	1	1
21	Sweden (SWE)	0	0	1	1
Totals (22 entries)		36	36	37	109
