= 1977 European Athletics Indoor Championships – Men's 60 metres =

The men's 60 metres event at the 1977 European Athletics Indoor Championships was held on 12 March in San Sebastián.

== Medalists ==
Gold	Silver	Bronze
Valeriy Borzov; Soviet Union	Christer Garpenborg; Sweden	Marian Woronin; Poland

== Results ==
=== Heats ===
First 2 from each heat (Q) and the next 4 fastest (q) qualified for the semifinals.

Rank	Heat	Name	Nationality	Time	Notes
1	3	Detlef Kübeck	East Germany	6.72	Q
2	3	Christer Garpenborg	Sweden	6.73	Q
2	4	Marian Woronin	Poland	6.73	Q
4	2	Klaus-Dieter Kurrat	East Germany	6.76	Q
5	3	Zenon Licznerski	Poland	6.80	q
5	4	Franco Fähndrich	Switzerland	6.80	Q
7	1	Valeriy Borzov	Soviet Union	6.82	Q
7	2	Tadeusz Tyszka	Poland	6.82	Q
9	2	Ján Chebeň	Czechoslovakia	6.85	q
10	1	Josep Carbonell	Spain	6.86	Q
11	1	Ivaylo Karanyotov	Bulgaria	6.87	q
12	2	Gabriel Leroy	France	6.88	q
13	2	Arto Bryggare	Finland	6.90	
14	3	Juan Val	Spain	6.93	
15	4	Ángel Ibañez	Spain	6.96	
16	4	Jean-Claude Amoureux	France	6.97	
17	3	Roger Martinelli	Luxembourg	7.01	
18	1	Frank Verhelst	Belgium	7.02	

=== Semifinals ===
First 3 from each heat (Q) qualified directly for the final.

Rank	Heat	Name	Nationality	Time	Notes
1	2	Valeriy Borzov	Soviet Union	6.65	Q
2	2	Marian Woronin	Poland	6.65	Q
3	2	Christer Garpenborg	Sweden	6.65	Q
4	1	Klaus-Dieter Kurrat	East Germany	6.70	Q
5	1	Detlef Kübeck	East Germany	6.72	Q
6	1	Zenon Licznerski	Poland	6.72	Q
7	2	Franco Fähndrich	Switzerland	6.75	
8	1	Tadeusz Tyszka	Poland	6.77	
9	1	Josep Carbonell	Spain	6.78	
10	1	Ivaylo Karanyotov	Bulgaria	6.80	
11	2	Ján Chebeň	Czechoslovakia	6.83	
12	2	Gabriel Leroy	France	6.90	

=== Final ===
Rank	Lane	Name	Nationality	Time	Notes
1st place, gold medalist(s)	1	Valeriy Borzov	Soviet Union	6.59	
2nd place, silver medalist(s)	4	Christer Garpenborg	Sweden	6.60	
3rd place, bronze medalist(s)	2	Marian Woronin	Poland	6.67	
4	3	Klaus-Dieter Kurrat	East Germany	6.69	
5	6	Detlef Kübeck	East Germany	6.75	
6	5	Zenon Licznerski	Poland	6.76	
