= 1979 European Athletics Indoor Championships – Men's 60 metres =

The men's 60 metres event at the 1979 European Athletics Indoor Championships was held on 24 February in Vienna.

== Medalists ==
Gold	Silver	Bronze
Marian Woronin; Poland	Leszek Dunecki; Poland	Petar Petrov; Bulgaria

== Results ==
=== Heats ===
First 3 from each heat (Q) and the next 3 fastest (q) qualified for the semifinals.

Rank	Heat	Name	Nationality	Time	Notes
1	1	Marian Woronin	Poland	6.62	Q
2	2	Aleksandr Aksinin	Soviet Union	6.71	Q
3	1	Leszek Dunecki	Poland	6.72	Q
4	3	Nikolay Kolesnikov	Soviet Union	6.74	Q
5	2	Petar Petrov	Bulgaria	6.76	Q
6	1	Franco Fähndrich	Switzerland	6.77	Q, SB
7	1	Klaus-Dieter Kurrat	East Germany	6.78	q
7	3	Zenon Licznerski	Poland	6.78	Q
9	3	Giovanni Grazioli	Italy	6.80	Q
10	3	Olaf Prenzler	East Germany	6.81	q
11	1	Ronald Desruelles	Belgium	6.84	q
12	2	Ján Chebeň	Czechoslovakia	6.85	Q, SB
13	2	Krasimir Sarbakov	Bulgaria	6.86	PB
14	3	Franco Zucchini	Italy	6.87	PB
15	1	Gilles Échevin	France	6.89	SB
16	2	Knut Stokke	Norway	6.92	SB

=== Semifinals ===
First 2 from each heat (Q) and the next 2 fastest (q) qualified for the final.

Rank	Heat	Name	Nationality	Time	Notes
1	1	Marian Woronin	Poland	6.62	Q
2	1	Petar Petrov	Bulgaria	6.64	Q
3	2	Leszek Dunecki	Poland	6.68	Q
4	2	Aleksandr Aksinin	Soviet Union	6.70	Q
5	1	Nikolay Kolesnikov	Soviet Union	6.71	q, SB
6	1	Klaus-Dieter Kurrat	East Germany	6.72	q
7	2	Olaf Prenzler	East Germany	6.75	PB
8	2	Zenon Licznerski	Poland	6.77	SB
9	1	Giovanni Grazioli	Italy	6.78	SB
9	2	Franco Fähndrich	Switzerland	6.78	
11	2	Ronald Desruelles	Belgium	6.81	SB
12	1	Ján Chebeň	Czechoslovakia	6.86	

=== Final ===
Rank	Lane	Name	Nationality	Time	Notes
1st place, gold medalist(s)	3	Marian Woronin	Poland	6.57	=AR, CR
2nd place, silver medalist(s)	2	Leszek Dunecki	Poland	6.62	PB
3rd place, bronze medalist(s)	6	Petar Petrov	Bulgaria	6.63	SB
4	1	Aleksandr Aksinin	Soviet Union	6.66	SB
5	5	Klaus-Dieter Kurrat	East Germany	6.67	SB
	4	Nikolay Kolesnikov	Soviet Union	DNF	
