= 1983 European Cup (athletics) =

- Dates: 20–21 August
- Host city: London, United Kingdom
- Venue: Crystal Palace National Sports Centre
- Level: Senior
- Type: Outdoor
- Events: 33

The 1983 European Cup was the 9th edition of the European Cup of athletics. From this edition on, the multiple stages of competition were replaced by the promotion/relegation league system.

The "A" Finals were held at the Crystal Palace National Sports Centre in London, Great Britain.

== "A" Final ==
Held on 20 and 21 August in London, United Kingdom

=== Team standings ===
Men
Pos.	Nation	Points
1	East Germany	117
2	Soviet Union	106
3	West Germany	102
4	Great Britain	94.5
5	Poland	86.5
6	Italy	80.5
7	France	70
8	Hungary	60.5

Women
Pos.	Nation	Points
1	East Germany	107
2	Soviet Union	85
3	Czechoslovakia	77
4	Great Britain	77
5	West Germany	58
6	Bulgaria	58
7	Poland	43
8	Hungary	34

=== Results summary ===
==== Men's events ====
Event	Gold		Silver		Bronze	
100 m (Wind: -1.5 m/s)	Frank Emmelmann; East Germany	10.58	Allan Wells; Great Britain	10.59	Antoine Richard; France	10.65
200 m (Wind: -0.7 m/s)	Allan Wells; Great Britain	20.72	Pietro Mennea; Italy	20.74	Erwin Skamrahl; West Germany	20.99
400 m	Hartmut Weber; West Germany	45.39	Thomas Schönlebe; East Germany	45.70	Sergey Lovachov; Soviet Union	45.83
800 m	Willi Wülbeck; West Germany	1:45.74; CR	Detlef Wagenknecht; East Germany	1:45.83	Peter Elliott; Great Britain	1:45.84
1500 m	Steve Cram; Great Britain	3:42.27	Andreas Busse; East Germany	3:43.12	Piotr Kurek; Poland	3:43.65
5000 m	Thomas Wessinghage; West Germany	13:48.72	Dmitriy Dmitriyev; Soviet Union	13:49.27	Alberto Cova; Italy	13:55.59
10,000 m	Werner Schildhauer; East Germany	28:02.11; CR	Alberto Cova; Italy	28:02.13	Valeriy Abramov; Soviet Union	28:02.87
3000 m steeplechase	Bogusław Mamiński; Poland	8:24.80	Colin Reitz; Great Britain	8:25.72	Joseph Mahmoud; France	8:28.04
110 m hurdles (Wind: -1.5 m/s)	Thomas Munkelt; East Germany	13.72	György Bakos; Hungary	13.74	Romuald Giegiel; Poland	13.88
400 m hurdles	Harald Schmid; West Germany	48.56	Aleksandr Kharlov; Soviet Union	49.53	Ryszard Szparak; Poland	49.65
4 × 100 m	Italy; Stefano Tilli; Carlo Simionato; Giovanni Bongiorni; Pietro Mennea	38.86	Great Britain; Lincoln Asquith; Donovan Reid; Mike McFarlane; Cameron Sharp	38.88	Poland; Krzysztof Zwoliński; Zenon Licznerski; Czesław Prądzyński; Marian Woronin	38.97
4 × 400 m	Great Britain; Kriss Akabusi; Garry Cook; Todd Bennett; Phil Brown	3:02.28	East Germany; Udo Bauer; Jens Carlowitz; Andreas Knebel; Thomas Schönlebe	3:02.62	Soviet Union; Sergey Lovachov; Viktor Markin; Yevgeniy Lomtev; Aliaksandr Trashchyla	3:02.77
High jump	Franck Verzy; France	2.32	Valeriy Sereda; Soviet Union	2.26	Dietmar Mögenburg; West Germany	2.23
Pole vault	Patrick Abada; France	5.55	Aleksandr Krupskiy; Soviet Union	5.50	Jürgen Winkler; West Germany	5.50
Long jump	László Szalma; Hungary	8.10w	Oganes Stepanyan; Soviet Union	8.09	Mathias Koch; East Germany	7.88w
Triple jump	Peter Bouschen; West Germany	17.12	Zdzisław Hoffmann; Poland	16.94	Béla Bakosi; Hungary	16.86
Shot put	Edward Sarul; Poland	20.54	Ulf Timmermann; East Germany	20.39	Jânis Bojârs; Soviet Union	20.16
Discus throw	Jürgen Schult; East Germany	64.96	Alwin Wagner; West Germany	64.14	Georgiy Kolnootchenko; Soviet Union	64.04
Hammer throw	Sergey Litvinov; Soviet Union	81.52; CR	Zdzisław Kwaśny; Poland	80.18	Günther Rodehau; East Germany	77.58
Javelin throw	Detlef Michel; East Germany	85.72	Heino Puuste; Soviet Union	85.54	Klaus Tafelmeier; West Germany	84.20
WR world record | AR area record | CR championship record | GR games record | NR national record | OR Olympic record | PB personal best | SB season best | WL world leading (in a given season)

==== Women's events ====
Event	Gold		Silver		Bronze	
100 m (Wind: -1.0 m/s)	Marlies Göhr; East Germany	11.28	Anelia Nuneva; Bulgaria	11.33	Kathy Cook; Great Britain	11.39
200 m (Wind: -1.7 m/s)	Jarmila Kratochvílová; Czechoslovakia	22.40	Marita Koch; East Germany	22.40	Kathy Cook; Great Britain	22.57
400 m	Tatána Kocembová; Czechoslovakia	49.33; CR	Mariya Pinigina; Soviet Union	49.63	Gaby Bussmann; West Germany	51.09
800 m	Jarmila Kratochvílová; Czechoslovakia	1:58.79	Antje Schröder; East Germany	1:59.53	Margrit Klinger; West Germany	1:59.64
1500 m	Nadezhda Ralldugina; Soviet Union	4:07.61	Christiane Wartenberg; East Germany	4:07.86	Totka Petrova; Bulgaria	4:08.02
3000 m	Tatyana Kazankina; Soviet Union	8:49.27; CR	Ulrike Bruns; East Germany	8:49.71	Jane Furniss; Great Britain	8:51.58
100 m hurdles (Wind: -2.1 m/s)	Bettine Jahn; East Germany	12.89	Lucyna Kałek; Poland	12.97	Ginka Zagorcheva; Bulgaria	13.10
400 m hurdles	Ellen Fiedler; East Germany	54.20	Ana Ambrazienė; Soviet Union	54.74	Sue Morley; Great Britain	56.36
4 × 100 m	East Germany; Silke Gladisch; Marita Koch; Ingrid Auerswald; Marlies Göhr	42.63	Great Britain; Joan Baptiste; Kathy Cook; Bev Callender; Shirley Thomas	43.18	Soviet Union; Lyudmila Kondratyeva; Yelena Vinogradova; Irina Olkhovnikova; Olga Antonova	43.67
4 × 400 m	Czechoslovakia; Zuzana Moravčíková; Milena Strnadová; Taťána Kocembová; Jarmila Kratochvílová	3:20.79	Soviet Union; Yelena Didilenko; Marina Kharlamova; Irina Baskakova; Mariya Pinigina	3:21.71	East Germany; Kerstin Walther; Sabine Busch; Undine Bremer; Dagmar Neubauer	3:22.70
High jump	Ulrike Meyfarth; West Germany	2.03; WR, CR	Tamara Bykova; Soviet Union	2.03; WR, CR	Kerstin Brandt; East Germany	1.99
Long jump	Heike Daute; East Germany	6.99; CR	Eva Murková; Czechoslovakia	6.81w	Bev Kinch; Great Britain	6.63
Shot put	Helena Fibingerová; Czechoslovakia	20.76	Helma Knorscheidt; East Germany	19.49	Nunu Abashidze; Soviet Union	18.88
Discus throw	Martina Opitz; East Germany	69.00	Galina Murašova; Soviet Union	68.86	Mariya Petkova; Bulgaria	64.88
Javelin throw	Fatima Whitbread; Great Britain	69.04	Antje Kempe; East Germany	63.22	Genowefa Olejarz; Poland	63.12
WR world record | AR area record | CR championship record | GR games record | NR national record | OR Olympic record | PB personal best | SB season best | WL world leading (in a given season)

== "B" Final ==
Both "B" finals held on 20 and 21 August

Men
Held in Prague, Czechoslovakia

Pos.	Nation	Points
1	Czechoslovakia	108
2	Spain	107
3	Finland	103.5
4	Sweden	100.5
5	Yugoslavia	92
6	Switzerland	73
7	Sweden	69
8	Belgium	65

Women
Held in Sittard, Netherlands

Pos.	Nation	Points
1	Italy	90
2	Romania	82
3	France	82
4	Finland	70
5	Sweden	70
6	Netherlands	55
7	Norway	50
8	Belgium	39

== "C" Finals ==
=== Men ===
Both "C" finals held on 20 and 21 August

"C1" Final
Held in Dublin, Ireland

Pos.	Nation	Points
1	Norway	83
2	Netherlands	63
3	Ireland	57
4	Denmark	49
5	Iceland	46

"C2" Final
Held in Lisbon, Portugal

Pos.	Nation	Points
1	Greece	68
2	Austria	58
3	Portugal	49
4	Luxembourg	23
–	Turkey	DNS

=== Women ===
Both "C" finals held on 20 and 21 August

"C1" Final
Held in Dublin, Ireland

Pos.	Nation	Points
1	Yugoslavia	63
2	Austria	44
3	Spain	42
4	Portugal	41
5	Greece	34

"C2" Final
Held in Lisbon, Portugal

Pos.	Nation	Points
1	Denmark	47
2	Switzerland	46
3	Ireland	33
4	Iceland	23
