= 1977 European Athletics Junior Championships =

- Level: Under 20
- Events: 36

The 1977 European Athletics Junior Championships was the fourth edition of the biennial athletics competition for European athletes aged under twenty. It was held in Donetsk, Ukrainian SSR, Soviet Union between 19 and 21 August.

== Men's results ==
Event	Gold		Silver		Bronze	
100 m	Hermann Panzo (FRA)	10.40	Olaf Prenzler (GDR)	10.53	Bernhard Hoff (GDR)	10.53
200 m	Bernhard Hoff (GDR)	20.59	Bernd Sattler (FRG)	21.05	Pascal Barré (FRA)	21.12
400 m	Roberto Tozzi (ITA)	47.18	Vyacheslav Dotsenko (URS)	47.32	Steve Wymark (GBR)	47.50
800 m	Andreas Busse (GDR)	1:47.8	Detlef Wagenknecht (GDR)	1:48.2	Guy Tondeur (BEL)	1:48.6
1500 m	Ari Paunonen (FIN)	3:41.6	Chris Sly (GBR)	3:44.6	Pierre Délèze (SUI)	3:45.0
3000 m	José Manuel Abascal (ESP)	7:58.3	Werner Schildhauer (GDR)	8:01.0	Hansjörg Kunze (GDR)	8:01.2
5000 m	Nathaniel Muir (GBR)	13:49.1	Volkmar Betz (FRG)	13:51.0	Nicholas Lees (GBR)	13:53.3
110 m hurdles	Arto Bryggare (FIN)	13.84	Mark Holtom (GBR)	14.29	Ingo Bruhn (GDR)	14.39
400 m hurdles	Manfred Konow (GDR)	50.61	Stefan Piecyk (POL)	51.23	Gary Oakes (GBR)	51.33
2000 m s'chase	Vesa Laukkanen (FIN)	5:30.2	Domingo Ramón (ESP)	5:34.1	Paul Nothacker (FRG)	5:34.8
10,000 m walk	Mykola Vynnychenko (URS)	41:31.6	Ronald Weigel (GDR)	42:56.7	Bengt Simonsen (SWE)	43:29.3
4 × 100 m relay	France (FRA); Pierrick Thessard; Hermann Panzo; Patrick Barré; Pascal Barré	39.99	East Germany (GDR); Erhard Gernand; Klaus Thiele; Thomas Malke; Bernhard Hoff	40.25	Poland (POL); Marek Fostiak; Eugeniusz Krawsz; Marek Radtke; Krzysztof Zwoliński	40.66
4 × 400 m relay	East Germany (GDR); Carsten Petters; Bernhard Hoff; Detlef Wagenknecht; Manfred Konow	3:07.8	Soviet Union (URS); Valeriy Stashuk; Mikhail Linge; Nikolay Chernetskiy; Vyacheslav Dotsenko	3:08.5	Great Britain (GBR); Greg Stewart; Daley Thompson; Steve Wymark; Andrew Kerr	3:09.5
Pole vault	Viktor Spasov (URS)	5.30 m	Felix Bohni (SUI)	5.20 m	Atanas Tarev (BUL)	5.10 m
High jump	Vladimir Yashchenko (URS)	2.30 m	Andre Schneider-Laub (FRG)	2.20 m	Alessandro Brogini (ITA)	2.14 m
Long jump	Stanisław Jaskułka (POL)	7.77 m	Ivan Tuparov (BUL)	7.63 m	Aleksandr Kozlov (URS)	7.59 m
Triple jump	Gennadiy Valyukevich (URS)	16.60 m	Vasiliy Grishchenkov (URS)	16.31 m	Klaus Kübler (FRG)	16.22 m
Shot put	Dietmar Krumm (GDR)	18.87 m	Roland Steuk (GDR)	17.61 m	Aleksandr Styepankov (URS)	17.50 m
Discus throw	Yuriy Dumchev (URS)	53.30 m	Alfonz Saskoi (HUN)	53.14 m	Werner Hartmann (FRG)	52.24 m
Javelin throw	Klaus Tafelmeier (FRG)	84.14 m	Arto Härkönen (FIN)	82.98 m	Roman Zwierchowski (POL)	82.56 m
Hammer throw	Roland Steuk (GDR)	70.78 m	Sergey Litvinov (URS)	68.76 m	Vladimir Nagurniy (URS)	67.60 m
Decathlon	Daley Thompson (GBR)	7647 pts	Ronald Wiese (GDR)	7564 pts	Jürgen Hingsen (FRG)	7524 pts

== Women's results ==
Event	Gold		Silver		Bronze	
100 m	Barbel Lockhoff (GDR)	11.48	Simone Naumann (GDR)	11.60	Kathy Smallwood (GBR)	11.71
200 m	Barbel Lockhoff (GDR)	23.12	Karin Verguts (BEL)	23.37	Kathy Smallwood (GBR)	23.53
400 m	Gaby Bussmann (FRG)	52.33	Karin Wahren (GDR)	52.99	Katrin Schulz (GDR)	53.29
800 m	Martina Kämpfert (GDR)	2:01.7	Hildegard Ullrich (GDR)	2:02.3	Josephine White (GBR)	2:03.4
1500 m	Dorthe Rasmussen (DEN)	4:20.9	Ursula Sauer (GDR)	4:21.7	Nadezhda Rodina (URS)	4:22.6
100 m hurdles	Kerstin Claus (GDR)	13.32	Regina Beyer (GDR)	13.33	Maria Kemenchezhi (URS)	13.71
4 × 100 m relay	East Germany (GDR); Simone Naumann; Bärbel Lockhoff; Kerstin Claus; Birgit Rabe	44.17	West Germany (FRG); Gisela Eichler; Silke Rasch; Claudia Steger; Ulrike Sommer	44.63	Great Britain (GBR); Heather Hunte; Kathy Smallwood; Michelle Probert; Janine MacGregor	44.71
4 × 400 m relay	West Germany (FRG); Gaby Bussmann; Claudia Steger; Friedericke Vombohr; Ina Wallburg	3:32.8	East Germany (GDR); Heike Hempel; Margit Kröning; Katrin Schulz; Karin Wahren	3:34.7	Soviet Union (URS); Galina Lev; Natalya Danilova; Irina Chyomina; Tatyana Savchenko	3:39.5
High jump	Kristine Nitzsche (GDR)	1.88 m	Marlis Wilken (FRG)	1.86 m	Sabine Serk (FRG) Danuta Bułkowska (POL)	1.81 m
Long jump	Nadezhda Zuyeva (URS)	6.35 m	Astrid Beiersdorf (FRG)	6.34 m	Heike Duwe (GDR)	6.30 m
Shot put	Simone Michel (GDR)	18.10 m	Cordula Schulze (GDR)	18.00 m	Tatyana Shcherbanos (URS)	15.78 m
Discus throw	Ines Reichenbach (GDR)	52.06 m	Gisela Beyer (GDR)	51.36 m	Lyudmila Dyevitskaya (URS)	50.72 m
Javelin throw	Heidi Repser (FRG)	61.96 m	Petra Felke (GDR)	57.68 m	Roswitha Potrek (GDR)	55.08 m
Pentathlon	Kristine Nitzsche (GDR)	4409 pts	Iris Kunstner (FRG)	4152 pts	Ina Losch (FRG)	4116 pts

== Medal table ==
Rank	Nation	Gold	Silver	Bronze	Total
1	East Germany (GDR)	15	16	6	37
2	Soviet Union (URS)	6	4	8	18
3	West Germany (FRG)	4	7	6	17
4	Finland (FIN)	3	1	0	4
5	Great Britain (GBR)	2	2	8	12
6	France (FRA)	2	0	1	3
7	Poland (POL)	1	1	3	5
8	Spain (ESP)	1	1	0	2
9	Italy (ITA)	1	0	1	2
10	Denmark (DEN)	1	0	0	1
11	Belgium (BEL)	0	1	1	2
11	Bulgaria (BUL)	0	1	1	2
11	Switzerland (CHE)	0	1	1	2
14	Hungary (HUN)	0	1	0	1
15	Sweden (SWE)	0	0	1	1
Totals (15 entries)		36	36	37	109
