= 1975 European Athletics Indoor Championships – Men's 60 metres =

The men's 60 metres event at the 1975 European Athletics Indoor Championships was held on 8 March in Katowice.

== Medalists ==
Gold	Silver	Bronze
Valeriy Borzov; Soviet Union	Aleksandr Aksinin; Soviet Union	Zenon Licznerski; Poland

== Results ==
=== Heats ===
First 2 from each heat (Q) and the next 4 fastest (q) qualified for the semifinals.

Rank	Heat	Name	Nationality	Time	Notes
1	1	Aleksandr Aksinin	Soviet Union	6.68	Q
2	2	Marian Woronin	Poland	6.72	Q
3	3	Zenon Licznerski	Poland	6.73	Q
4	3	Luciano Caravani	Italy	6.76	Q
5	2	Aleksandr Kornelyuk	Soviet Union	6.77	Q
6	4	Valeriy Borzov	Soviet Union	6.78	Q
7	3	Raimo Vilén	Finland	6.79	q
8	1	Alexander Thieme	East Germany	6.81	Q
9	3	Samuel Monsels	Netherlands	6.83	q
10	4	Jan Alończyk	Poland	6.84	Q
11	1	Javier Martínez	Spain	6.85	q
11	2	Lajos Gresa	Hungary	6.85	q
13	4	Josep Carbonell	Spain	6.87	
14	1	Heinz Busche	West Germany	6.88	
14	2	Raymond Heerenveen	Netherlands	6.88	
14	4	Jean-Claude Amoureux	France	6.88	
17	1	Antti Rajamäki	Finland	6.89	
18	4	Ossi Karttunen	Finland	6.95	
19	4	Audun Garshol	Norway	6.99	
20	3	Otakar Wild	Czechoslovakia	7.07	
21	2	Temel Erbek	Turkey	7.10	

=== Semifinals ===
First 2 from each heat (Q) and the next 2 fastest (q) qualified for the final.

Rank	Heat	Name	Nationality	Time	Notes
1	1	Aleksandr Aksinin	Soviet Union	6.63	Q
2	1	Zenon Licznerski	Poland	6.71	Q
3	1	Aleksandr Kornelyuk	Soviet Union	6.71	Q
4	2	Valeriy Borzov	Soviet Union	6.74	Q
5	1	Alexander Thieme	East Germany	6.75	q
6	2	Marian Woronin	Poland	6.77	Q
7	2	Luciano Caravani	Italy	6.79	
8	2	Jan Alończyk	Poland	6.81	
9	1	Samuel Monsels	Netherlands	6.82	
10	2	Lajos Gresa	Hungary	6.83	
11	1	Javier Martínez	Spain	6.84	
12	2	Raimo Vilén	Finland	6.90	

=== Final ===
Rank	Lane	Name	Nationality	Time	Notes
1st place, gold medalist(s)	6	Valeriy Borzov	Soviet Union	6.59	
2nd place, silver medalist(s)	3	Aleksandr Aksinin	Soviet Union	6.67	
3rd place, bronze medalist(s)	2	Zenon Licznerski	Poland	6.74	
4	5	Marian Woronin	Poland	6.76	
5	1	Alexander Thieme	East Germany	6.78	
6	4	Aleksandr Kornelyuk	Soviet Union	6.80	
