= 1981 European Athletics Indoor Championships – Men's 50 metres =

The men's 50 metres event at the 1981 European Athletics Indoor Championships was held on 21 February.

== Medalists ==
| Gold | Silver | Bronze |
|---|---|---|
| Marian Woronin; Poland | Vladimir Muravyov; Soviet Union | Andrey Shlyapnikov; Soviet Union |

== Results ==
=== Heats ===
First 3 from each heat (Q) and the next 3 fastest (q) qualified for the semifinals.

| Rank | Heat | Name | Nationality | Time | Notes |
|---|---|---|---|---|---|
| 1 | 3 | Marian Woronin | Poland | 5.70 | Q, CR |
| 2 | 2 | Andrey Shlyapnikov | Soviet Union | 5.78 | Q |
| 3 | 1 | Marc Gasparoni | France | 5.79 | Q |
| 3 | 1 | Vladimir Muravyov | Soviet Union | 5.79 | Q |
| 3 | 2 | Philippe Le Joncour | France | 5.79 | Q |
| 6 | 1 | Josep Carbonell | Spain | 5.84 | Q |
| 6 | 3 | Antoine Richard | France | 5.84 | Q |
| 6 | 3 | Ivaylo Karanyotov | Bulgaria | 5.84 | Q |
| 9 | 3 | Luciano Caravani | Italy | 5.85 | q |
| 10 | 2 | Selwyn Clarke | Great Britain | 5.86 | Q |
| 11 | 2 | Jerzy Brunner | Poland | 5.89 | q |
| 12 | 1 | Stefan Nilsson | Sweden | 5.92 | q |
| 13 | 1 | Franco Zucchini | Italy | 5.93 | |
| 14 | 3 | Aleksandar Popović | Yugoslavia | 5.97 | |
| 15 | 1 | Roland Jokl | Austria | 5.98 | |
| 16 | 2 | Josef Mayr | Austria | 5.98 | |

=== Semifinals ===
First 3 from each semifinal qualified directly (Q) for the final.

| Rank | Heat | Name | Nationality | Time | Notes |
|---|---|---|---|---|---|
| 1 | 1 | Marian Woronin | Poland | 5.67 | Q, CR |
| 2 | 1 | Vladimir Muravyov | Soviet Union | 5.73 | Q |
| 3 | 2 | Andrey Shlyapnikov | Soviet Union | 5.76 | Q |
| 4 | 2 | Antoine Richard | France | 5.78 | Q |
| 5 | 1 | Philippe Le Joncour | France | 5.79 | Q |
| 5 | 2 | Selwyn Clarke | Great Britain | 5.79 | Q |
| 7 | 1 | Luciano Caravani | Italy | 5.80 | |
| 7 | 1 | Ivaylo Karanyotov | Bulgaria | 5.80 | |
| 7 | 2 | Marc Gasparoni | France | 5.80 | |
| 10 | 2 | Josep Carbonell | Spain | 5.82 | |
| 11 | 1 | Stefan Nilsson | Sweden | 5.83 | |
| 12 | 2 | Jerzy Brunner | Poland | 5.89 | |

=== Final ===
| Rank | Name | Nationality | Time | Notes |
|---|---|---|---|---|
| 1st place, gold medalist(s) | Marian Woronin | Poland | 5.65 | CR |
| 2nd place, silver medalist(s) | Vladimir Muravyov | Soviet Union | 5.76 | |
| 3rd place, bronze medalist(s) | Andrey Shlyapnikov | Soviet Union | 5.77 | |
| 4 | Antoine Richard | France | 5.78 | |
| 5 | Philippe Le Joncour | France | 5.79 | |
| 6 | Selwyn Clarke | Great Britain | 5.82 | |
