= 1979 IAAF World Cup =

The 2nd IAAF World Cup in Athletics was an international track and field sporting event sponsored by the International Association of Athletics Federations, held on August 24–26, 1979, at Olympic Stadium in Montreal, Quebec, Canada.

== Overall results ==
=== Men ===
Pos.	Team	Result
1	United States	119
2	Europe	112
3	East Germany	108
4	Soviet Union	102
5	America	98
6	Africa	84
7	Oceania	58
8	Asia	36

=== Women ===
Pos.	Team	Result
1	East Germany	106
2	Soviet Union	98
3	Europe	88
4	United States	76
5	America	68
6	Oceania	47
7	Africa	30
8	Asia	26

== Medal summary ==
=== Men ===
Event	Gold		Silver		Bronze	
100 metres	James Sanford (USA); United States	10.17	Silvio Leonard (CUB); Americas	10.26	Marian Woronin (POL); Europe	10.28
200 metres	Silvio Leonard (CUB); Americas	20.34	Leszek Dunecki (POL); Europe	20.50	Peter Okodogbe (NGR); Africa	20.69
400 metres	Hassan El Kachief (SUD); Africa	45.39	Nikolay Chernetskiy (URS); Soviet Union	46.06	Tony Darden (USA); United States	46.12
800 metres	James Maina Boi (KEN); Africa	1:47.69	James Robinson (USA); United States	1:47.85	Willi Wülbeck (FRG); Europe	1:47.88
1500 metres	Thomas Wessinghage (FRG); Europe	3:46.00	Vladimir Ponomaryov (URS); Soviet Union	3:46.13	Jürgen Straub (GDR); East Germany	3:46.30
5000 metres	Miruts Yifter (ETH); Africa	13:35.9	Valeriy Abramov (URS); Soviet Union	13:37.6	Markus Ryffel (SUI); Europe	13:38.6
10,000 metres	Miruts Yifter (ETH); Africa	27:53.07	Craig Virgin (USA); United States	27:59.55	Aleksandras Antipovas (URS); Soviet Union	28:25.17
110 metre hurdles	Renaldo Nehemiah (USA); United States	13.39	Thomas Munkelt (GDR); East Germany	13.42	Alejandro Casañas (CUB); Americas	13.44
400 metre hurdles	Edwin Moses (USA); United States	47.53	Harald Schmid (FRG); Europe	48.71	Vasyl Arkhypenko (URS); Soviet Union	48.97
3000 metre steeplechase	Kip Rono (KEN); Africa	8:25.97	Ralf Pönitzsch (GDR); East Germany	8:29.28	Mariano Scartezzini (ITA); Europe	8:29.44
4×100 metre relay	Americas; Osvaldo Lara; Nelson dos Santos; Silvio Leonard; Altevir de Araújo	38.70	United States; Mike Roberson; Harvey Glance; Mel Lattany; Steve Riddick	38.77	Europe; Jerzy Brunner; Leszek Dunecki; Zenon Licznerski; Marian Woronin	38.85
4×400 metre relay	United States; Herman Frazier; Bill Green; Willie Smith; Tony Darden	3:00.70	Europe; Ryszard Podlas; Franz-Peter Hofmeister; Harry Schulting; Harald Schmid	3:00.80	Africa; Billy Konchellah; Dele Udo; James Atuti; Hassan El Kachief	3:01.22
High jump	Franklin Jacobs (USA); United States	2.27	Jacek Wszoła (POL); Europe	2.27	Aleksandr Grigoryev (URS); Soviet Union	2.24
Pole vault	Mike Tully (USA); United States	5.45	Patrick Abada (FRA); Europe	5.45	Konstantin Volkov (URS); Soviet Union	5.30
Long jump	Larry Myricks (USA); United States	8.52	Lutz Dombrowski (GDR); East Germany	8.27	David Giralt (CUB); Americas	8.22
Triple jump	João Carlos de Oliveira (BRA); Americas	17.02	Gennadiy Valyukevich (URS); Soviet Union	16.94	Ian Campbell (AUS); Oceania	16.76
Shot put	Udo Beyer (GDR); East Germany	20.45	Reijo Ståhlberg (FIN); Europe	20.05	Aleksandr Baryshnikov (URS); Soviet Union	20.00
Discus throw	Wolfgang Schmidt (GDR); East Germany	66.02	Mac Wilkins (USA); United States	64.92	Luis Delís (CUB); Americas	63.50
Hammer throw	Sergey Litvinov (URS); Soviet Union	78.70	Karl-Hans Riehm (FRG); Europe	75.88	Roland Steuk (GDR); East Germany	74.82
Javelin throw	Wolfgang Hanisch (GDR); East Germany	86.48	Mike O'Rourke (NZL); Oceania	85.80	Antonio González (CUB); Americas	83.44

=== Women ===
Event	Gold		Silver		Bronze	
100 metres	Evelyn Ashford (USA); United States	11.06	Marlies Göhr (GDR); East Germany	11.17	Annegret Richter (FRG); Europe	11.36
200 metres	Evelyn Ashford (USA); United States	21.83	Marita Koch (GDR); East Germany	22.02	Lyudmila Kondratyeva (URS); Soviet Union	22.66
400 metres	Marita Koch (GDR); Europe	48.97	Mariya Kulchunova (URS); Soviet Union	50.60	Irena Szewińska (POL); Europe	51.15
800 metres	Nikolina Shtereva (BUL); Europe	2:00.52	Nadezhda Mushta (URS); Soviet Union	2:01.09	Anita Weiß (GDR); East Germany	2:01.33
1500 metres	Christiane Wartenberg (GDR); East Germany	4:06.88^{1}	Giana Romanova (URS); Soviet Union	4:08.73	Francie Larrieu (USA); United States	4:09.16
3000 metres	Svetlana Ulmasova (URS); Soviet Union	8:36.34	Grete Waitz (NOR); Europe	8:38.59	Francie Larrieu (USA); United States	8:53.02
100 metre hurdles	Grażyna Rabsztyn (POL); Europe	12.67	Tatyana Anisimova (URS); Soviet Union	12.75	Kerstin Claus (GDR); East Germany	13.03
400 metre hurdles	Bärbel Klepp (GDR); East Germany	55.83	Marina Makeyeva (URS); Soviet Union	56.02	Debbie Esser (USA); United States	56.75
4×100 metre relay	Europe; Linda Haglund; Chantal Réga; Annegret Richter; Heather Hunte	42.19	East Germany; Christina Brehmer; Romy Schneider; Ingrid Auerswald; Marlies Göhr	42.32	Soviet Union; Vera Anisimova; Olga Korotkova; Marina Sidorova; Lyudmila Kondratyeva	42.52
4×400 metre relay	East Germany; Gabriele Kotte; Christina Brehmer; Brigitte Köhn; Marita Koch	3:20.37	Soviet Union; Irina Bagryantseva; Tatyana Prorochenko; Nina Zyuskova; Mariya Kulchunova	3:23.04	United States; Sharon Dabney; Rosalyn Bryant; Patricia Jackson; Sherri Howard	3:27.36
High jump	Debbie Brill (CAN); Americas	1.96	Sara Simeoni (ITA); Europe	1.94	Nina Serbina (URS); Soviet Union	1.90
Long jump	Anita Stukane (URS); Soviet Union	6.64	Brigitte Wujak (GDR); East Germany	6.55	Kathy McMillan (USA); United States	6.31
Shot put	Ilona Slupianek (GDR); East Germany	20.98	Helena Fibingerová (TCH); Europe	19.74	Svetlana Krachevskaya (URS); Soviet Union	19.70
Discus throw	Evelin Jahl (GDR); East Germany	65.18	Svetlana Melnikova (URS); Soviet Union	65.14	María Cristina Betancourt (CUB); Americas	62.84
Javelin throw	Ruth Fuchs (GDR); East Germany	66.10	Éva Ráduly-Zörgő (ROU); Europe	65.82	María Caridad Colón (CUB); Americas	63.50

^{1} Totka Petrova of Europe originally won the 1500m with 4:06.47, but she was disqualified after it was found that she had failed a doping test at the Balkan Games.
