= Willie Smith (sprinter) =

American sprinter (1956–2020)

Personal information
- Nationality: American
- Born: Willie James Smith III; February 28, 1956 Rochester, Pennsylvania, U.S.
- Died: November 7, 2020 (aged 64)
- Height: 5 ft 8 in (1.73 m)
- Weight: 161 lb (73 kg)

Sport
- Sport: Running
- Event: 400 meters
- College team: Auburn Tigers

Achievements and titles
- Personal best: 400m - 44.73 s (1978)
Medal record
Men's Athletics
Representing the United States
Olympic Games
Gold medal – first place	1984 Los Angeles	4x400 m relay
Athletics World Cup
Gold medal – first place	1979 Montreal	4x400 m relay
Gold medal – first place	1981 Rome	4x400 m relay
Pan American Games
Bronze medal – third place	1979 San Juan	400 metres
World Student Games
Silver medal – second place	1977 Sofia	400 metres

Willie James Smith III (February 28, 1956 – November 7, 2020) was an American athlete who was the national champion 400 metres runner in 1979-80, and a gold medal winner at the 1984 Olympics in the 4 × 400 m relay.

== College track career ==
Smith attended Auburn University, where he was a successful athlete for the Auburn Tigers. Smith arrived at Auburn as a nationally renowned high-school sprinter from his time at Uniondale High School, New York. Track and Field News named him High School Athlete of the Year in 1974.

Smith started his college career as a sprinter. He then switched to the longer distance of 400 m., prompted by injuries incurred in shorter sprints, and by the emergence of competition from up-and-coming sprinters like Harvey Glance. Despite this, Smith was a successful enough 100 m. sprinter to be an alternate for the United States 4 × 100 m. relay team at the 1976 Montreal Olympics. Having finished fifth in the 100 m. final at the United States Olympic Trials, he was placed in the third qualifying position up to 80 m. of the race.

At his new distance of 400 m., Smith quickly achieved national success, winning the 1978 and 1979 NCAA Division I Indoor Track and Field Championships titles at the distance. Smith was also runner-up in the 400 meters at the 1978 NCAA Division I Outdoor Track and Field Championships, behind Cal winner Billy Mullins whose title was later revoked due to academic ineligibility.

Internationally, Smith won a silver medal at the 1977 World Student Games at 400 m.

When he graduated in 1978, Smith received his university's top honor of Athlete of the Year.

== Later track career ==
After graduation, Smith continued as an athlete. He was twice United States National Champion at 400m., in 1979 and 1980. His reward in 1979 was a place on the American team for the Pan American Games at 400 m. Here he won bronze. Smith, as American No. 1 was expected to be the main rival to the great Cuban athlete Alberto Juantorena. In the end, a foot injury and a problem with a shoe, plus an inspired piece of running by his American colleague Tony Darden, meant it was Darden and not him who beat Juantorena into second.

Smith finished second in the 400 m. final at the United States Olympic Trials for the 1980 Olympics. He was unable to compete due to the United States boycott of those games. A defeat of the Olympic champion Viktor Markin was little consolation. Years later, he did receive one of 461 Congressional Gold Medals created especially for the spurned athletes.

Smith was also a member of winning United States 4 × 400 m. relay teams in the 1979 and 1981 IAAF Athletics World Cups.

In 1983, he competed at the inaugural IAAF Athletics World Championships in the American 4 × 400 m. relay team. However, he collided with a competing Soviet Union runner on the third leg, falling, leaving the American final leg runner, the great 400 m. hurdler Ed Moses, with no chance of victory despite his valiant but vain effort to catch the leaders - the team eventually finished down the field. Smith said "It was a stupid mistake. I almost quit the sport."

In 1984, Smith finished sixth in the 400 m. final at the United States Olympic Trials for the 1984 Los Angeles Olympics thus qualifying to be part of the 4 × 400 m. relay squad for those games. The United States 4 × 400 m. relay team came first and Smith received an Olympic gold medal by virtue of having run a leg for the team in a qualifying heat and the semi-final.

In 1988, he attempted again to qualify for the Olympics, as a 32-year-old. He failed, finishing 8th in a semi-final of the 400 m. trial at the United States Olympic Trials. He was reported as working then full-time as a television news director. Smith himself at the time wondered about "what makes him run" and considered the attempt at making the Olympic team like "a bad habit. It gets in your blood".

In 1996, Smith attempted to compete at the 1996 Atlanta Olympics as a 40-year-old. His struggle was chronicled in the New York Times. He did not qualify, even with advice from the elder statesmen of track coaching Brooks Johnson and Mel Rosen (his old college coach). However, he did set a master's record.

Since then he has created and worked at sporting camps for young people.

In 1997, Smith was inducted into the Alabama Sports Hall of Fame.

In 2000, he was honored as one of six new stars in Auburn's Tiger Trail, Auburn University's replica of Hollywood's walk of fame.

== Rankings ==
Track and Field News ranked Smith among the best 400 m runners in the US and the world from 1977 to 1985.

400 meters
Year	World rank	US rank
1977	6th	3rd
1978	3rd	2nd
1979	4th	2nd
1980	6th	1st
1981	5th	4th
1982	-	-
1983	-	7th
1984	-	6th
1985	-	9th

== USA Championships ==
Smith was a very successful competitor at 400 metres at the USA National Track and Field Championships between 1979 and 1983:

USA Championships
Year	400m
1979	1st
1980	1st
1981	3rd
1982	-
1983	4th

Awards
Preceded by Craig Virgin	Track & Field News High School Boys Athlete of the Year; 1974	Succeeded by Houston McTear
