= James Sanford (sprinter) =

American sprinter (born 1957)

Personal information
- Nationality: United States
- Born: December 27, 1957 (age 68)

Sport
- Sport: Athletics
- Event: Sprints

Achievements and titles
- Personal bests: 100 m: 10.02 s (Westwood, Los Angeles CA, USA; 11/05/1980); 200 m: 20.19 s (Westwood, Los Angeles CA, USA; 28/04/1979)
Medal record
Representing United States
Men's athletics
IAAF World Cup
Gold medal – first place	1979 Montreal	100 m

James Sanford (born December 27, 1957) is a retired track and field sprinter from the United States. He was champion at the 100 metres at the 1979 IAAF Athletics World Cup in Montreal and also held the best time for the 100 metres at a low altitude for one year, a time of 10.02 seconds, until Carl Lewis improved this record to 10.00 seconds in May 1981.

== Career ==
While running for Pasadena High School, Sanford won the 400 metres, anchored his team to victory in the 4 × 400 metres relay and was second in the 200 metres (a race brother Michael was to win the next two years) at the 1977 CIF California State Meet. After high school, he moved on to the University of Southern California. Here he enjoyed great track success over the next four years. Sanford still holds the school records in the 100 metres and 200 metres - a statement all the more impressive considering some of the people who have been through the program including Olympic sprint Gold Medalists Lennox Miller, Don Quarrie, Mel Patton and Quincy Watts. Along with brother Michael he also is on the school record holding 4 × 100 metres relay team.

Sanford originally considered himself a 200/400 metres runner and it was only in 1978 that he started to concentrate on the 100 meters. This change resulted in winning the British AAA Championships title at the 1978 AAA Championships. In 1979, wins came in the NCAA championships and US National Championships 100 meters events.

The win in the national championships qualified Sanford for the USA team at the 1979 IAAF World Cup where he became champion at 100 metres. Sanford picked up a muscle injury in a race in Berlin seven days earlier and was a doubt to run (Harvey Glance was to be his substitute). It was also suggested that he anchor the United States 4 × 100 m relay team but in the end United States team coach, Sam Bell, favoured the experience of Steve Riddick.

Sanford was considered the favorite in the lead-up to the 1980 Summer Olympics boycott-marred United States Olympic Trials (track and field). However, he suffered an early-season defeat by a young Carl Lewis, then finished third in the 100 metres at the NCAA championships before finally injuring himself in the 200 metres there, ending his season. (He also did not qualify for the 1984 Olympics, only finishing 5th in his semi-final of the 100 m.)

On May 11, 1980 at a meet in Westwood, Los Angeles, California, Sanford set the unofficial low altitude world record in the 100 metres at 10.02 s, a mark which stood for just over a year, when it was improved by Carl Lewis to 10.00 s.

In 1981 he set the world's best year performance in the men's 200 metres clocking 20.20 s on 10 May at a meet in Westwood, Los Angeles.

== Rankings ==
Sanford was ranked among the best in the US and the world in both the 100 and 200 m sprint events from 1978 to 1981, according to the votes of the experts of Track and Field News.

100 meters
Year	World rank	US rank
1978	-	8th
1979	1st	1st
1980	4th	2nd
1981	4th	3rd

200 meters
Year	World rank	US rank
1978	9th	4th
1979	6th	2nd
1980	8th	4th
1981	3rd	2nd

== USA Championships ==
Sanford was a very successful competitor in the USA National Track and Field Championships between 1978 and 1981:

USA Championships
Year	100 m	200 m
1978	-	5th
1979	1st	-
1980	-	-
1981	4th	3rd

Sporting positions
Preceded by (United States) Steve Williams	Men's 100m Champion IAAF World Cup; 1979	Succeeded by (United Kingdom) Allan Wells
Preceded by (Italy) Pietro Mennea	Men's 100m Best Year Performance; 1980	Succeeded by (United States) Carl Lewis
Preceded by (Italy) Pietro Mennea	Men's 200m Best Year Performance; 1981	Succeeded by (United States) Mike Miller
