= Angelika Zauber =

German former middle-distance runner (born 1958)

Medal record

Women's athletics

Representing East Germany

IAAF World Cup
Gold medal – first place	1981 Rome	3000 m

Angelika Zauber (née Kuhse; born 5 November 1958) is a German former middle-distance runner who competed for East Germany in the 1500 metres and 3000 metres. She was the 3000 m gold medallist at the 1981 IAAF World Cup and the 1981 European Cup. She was a two-time national champion over 1500 m and set a best of 3:59.90 minutes at the competition.

== Career ==
Her first international title came at the 1975 European Athletics Junior Championships, where she defeated Loa Olafsson and future Olympic champion Gabriella Dorio to win the 1500 m gold medal. She married fellow East German runner Lutz Zauber and began competing under her married name. The couple later had a child in 1987, Falko Zauber, who himself competed in distance running for Germany.

Zauber's career peak was the 1981 track and field season. She began by winning her first national title at the East German Indoor Athletics Championships in the 1500 m. She extended her success outdoors with a win at the East German Athletics Championships where she became the first and only woman ever to run under four minutes for the 1500 m at that competition. This was a lifetime best mark for the athlete and she placed seventh on the global rankings for that year. She also placed second in the 3000 m behind Ulrike Bruns.

She was selected to run the 3000 m for East Germany at the 1981 European Cup and she delivered her first senior international win in a championship record time of 8:49.61 minutes. The East German women won all but four of their events and were the clear winner of the team title. She was chosen to represent her nation again over that distance at the 1981 IAAF World Cup and she topped the podium, nearly a second clear of future Olympic champion Maricica Puică and world record holder Silvana Cruciata.

Zauber did not appear at any major championships after that year and her last result of note came in 1985, at the age of 26, when she was runner-up nationally in the 3000 m for a second time (this time behind Ines Bibernell).

== National titles ==
- East German Athletics Championships
  - 1500 m: 1981
- East German Indoor Athletics Championships
  - 1500 m: 1981

== International competitions ==
Year	Competition	Venue	Position	Event	Notes
1975	European Junior Championships	Athens, Greece	1st	1500 m	4:18.6
1981	European Cup	Zagreb, Yugoslavia	1st	3000 m	8:49.61 CR
1981	World Cup	Rome, Italy	1st	3000 m	8:54.89
