= Sigrid Ulbricht =

German long jumper

Medal record

Women's athletics

Representing East Germany

IAAF World Cup
Gold medal – first place	1981 Rome	Long jump

European Indoor Championships
Silver medal – second place	1981 Grenoble	Long jump

Sigrid Ulbricht (née Heimann; born 25 July 1958) is a German former track and field athlete who competed in the long jump for East Germany. She was the champion at the IAAF World Cup and European Cup in 1981 and represented her country at the Olympic Games in 1980.

== Career ==
Born in Klötze, Bezirk Magdeburg, she took up athletics and became a member of the SC Magdeburg sports club. Ulbricht originally competed in the women's pentathlon and recorded a best score of 4303 points in 1977. She rose to prominence in the long jump in 1980 with a runner-up finish at the East German Athletics Championships behind Siegrun Siegl. That year she was selected for the Moscow Olympics and finished seventh in the final.

Ulbricht's best season came in 1981. She was runner-up nationally, this time to Heike Drechsler, but claimed a series of international medals. At the 1981 European Athletics Indoor Championships she was the silver medallist behind her West German rival Karin Hänel. She won both the semi-final and final stages of the 1981 European Cup with bests of 6.85 m (22 ft 5 1/2 in) then 6.86 m (22 ft 6 in). She achieved a lifetime best of 6.89 m (22 ft 7 1/4 in) in Jena that August before going on to win the 1981 IAAF World Cup in a meet record of 6.80 m (22 ft 3 1/2 in).

Ulbricht skipped the following two seasons and made her last appearances in 1984, coming second to Drechsler at the national championships and setting a season's best of 6.84 m (22 ft 5 1/4 in). She had a daughter Anne Ulbricht who later went on to represent Germany in handball.

Ulbricht was among the athletes subject to East German state doping, with her documents being revealed by Brigitte Berendonk.

== International competitions ==
Year	Competition	Venue	Position	Event	Notes
1980	Olympic Games	Moscow, Soviet Union	7th	Long jump	6.71 m
1981	European Indoor Championships	Grenoble, France	2nd	Long jump	6.66 m
1981	European Cup	Zagreb, Yugoslavia	1st	Long jump	6.86 m
1981	World Cup	Rome, Italy	1st	Long jump	6.80 m

== See also ==
- List of doping cases in athletics
