= Dmitriy Dmitriyev =

Russian long-distance runner

Medal record

Men's athletics

Representing the Soviet Union

Friendship Games
Silver medal – second place	1984 Moscow	5000 m

Dmitry Georgievich Dmitriev (Russian: Дмитрий Георгиевич Дмитриев; born 3 March 1956) is a Russian male former long-distance runner who competed for the Soviet Union. He competed in the 5000 metres at the 1983 World Championships in Athletics and placed fourth after pushing the pace near the end. He also competed at the European Athletics Championships in 1982, finishing eleventh. He was a 5000 m silver medallist at the Friendship Games in 1984 and 1983 European Cup. His highest global ranking was third in the 3000 metres in the 1984 season.

Born in Leningrad, he became involved in athletics at a young age. He subsequently went on to study sport at the Military Institute of Physical Culture. His first international success came at the 1975 European Athletics Junior Championships, where he was runner-up to Finland's Ari Paunonen in the 1500 metres. He was a five-time national champion at the Soviet Athletics Championships, winning a 1500 metres/5000 m double in 1980 before extending his 5000 m title to four consecutive victories. His winning time of 13:19.18 minutes in 1982 was the fastest ever recorded at the competition. On the national circuit, he was twice winner of the 5000 m at the Znamensky Memorial, placing first in 1982 and 1983.

== International competitions ==
Year	Competition	Venue	Position	Event	Notes
1975	European Junior Championships	Athens, Greece	2nd	1500 m	3:45.1
1982	European Championships	Athens, Greece	11th	5000 m	13:37.91
1983	European Cup	London, United Kingdom	2nd	5000 m	13:49.27
1983	World Championships	Helsinki, Finland	4th	5000 m	13:30.38
1984	Friendship Games	Moscow, Soviet Union	2nd	5000 m	13:26.85

== National titles ==
- Soviet Athletics Championships
  - 1500 m: 1980
  - 5000 m: 1980, 1981, 1982, 1983

== Personal bests ==
- 1500 metres – 3:36.50 min (1984)
- 3000 metres – 7:42.05 min (1984)
- 5000 metres – 13:17.37 min (1984)
- 10,000 metres – 28:24.89 min (1988)
