= Jaroslav Prišcák =

Czechoslovak long and triple jumper

Personal information
- Born: 28 August 1956 (age 69) Prague, Czechoslovakia

Sport
- Sport: Track and field
Medal record
Representing Czechoslovakia
European Junior Championships
Gold medal – first place	1975 Athens	Long jump

Jaroslav Prišcák (born 28 August 1956) is a retired Czechoslovak long and triple jumper.

In the long jump he won the bronze medal at the 1975 European Junior Championships, finished eighth at the 1975 European Indoor Championships, and twelfth at the 1980 European Indoor Championships.

He became Czechoslovak champion in 1982 and 1985 (both triple jump); and Czechoslovak indoor champion in 1980 (long jump), 1982, 1983 and 1986 (all triple jump).

His personal best triple jump was 17.23 metres, achieved in May 1984 in Prague.
