= Christer Garpenborg =

Swedish sprinter

Personal information
- Nationality: Swedish
- Born: Harry Christer Garpenborg; May 12, 1952 (age 74) Stockholm, Sweden
- Years active: 1974-1981
- Height: 180 cm (5 ft 11 in)
- Weight: 80 kg (176 lb)

Sport
- Country: Sweden
- Sport: Track and field athletics

Achievements and titles
- Olympic finals: 1976 Summer Olympics
Medal record
Men's athletics
Representing Sweden
European Indoor Championships
Silver medal – second place	1977 San Sebastián	60 m

Harry Christer Garpenborg (born 12 May 1952) is a Swedish former sprinter who competed in the 1976 Summer Olympics.

== Career ==
In 1974, Chris Garpenborg tied the 60-yard world record at 5.9, beating Steve Williams in the Sunkist Invitational in Los Angeles. In the same year he won the Dallas Invitational 100 yard dash in 9.30, beating Don Quarrie. The hand times showed 2 watches of 9.0, which would have equaled Ivory Crocket's world record.

Garpenborg was an All-American sprinter for the UTEP Miners track and field team, placing 4th in the 4 × 100 metres relay at the 1973 NCAA University Division Outdoor Track and Field Championships.

He won the Penn Relays 100-yard dash in the time of 9.2 seconds.

Garpenborg won the Las Vegas Invitational 100 meters in the time of 9.84, beating Clancy Edwards in 1976. The time was, however, disputed since the wind gauge was not functioning properly. It is, however, the fastest time ever recorded by a Caucasian.

In 1976, Garpenborg became AAU American champion in the 100 meters.

During the 1976 Montreal Olympics, he competed with an injured back in the 100 meters where he finished in 8th position.

Garpenborg claimed silver in the 60 meters San Sebastian Spain European Championship. He was beaten by Valeriy Borsov by 1 hundredth of a second. Many that witnessed the race felt he should have been the winner including Borsov.

He also gained European Cup victories in the 100 and 200 meters.

In 1977, he suffered a serious motorcycle accident.

Three years later, he became the New South Wales Champion in the 100 meters in 1980.

== Poisoning Incident ==
While preparing for the Moscow Olympics in 1980, he was diagnosed with mercury poisoning believed to be caused by his amalgam fillings.

== Retirement ==
Garpenborg came back from his mercury poisoning to become Swedish Champion in the 100 meters once more in 1981 before retiring from the sport the same year.
