= Tony Darden =

American track and field athlete

Personal information
- Born: Tony Lee Darden; September 2, 1957 (age 69)
- Height: 5 ft 10 in (1.78 m)
- Weight: 150 lb (68 kg)
Medal record
Men's athletics
Representing the United States
Pan American Games
Gold medal – first place	1979 San Juan	400 metres
Gold medal – first place	1979 San Juan	4×400 metres
Athletics World Cup
Gold medal – first place	1979 Montreal	4×400 metres
Gold medal – first place	1981 Rome	4×400 metres
Bronze medal – third place	1979 Montreal	400 metres

Tony Darden (born September 2, 1957) is an American former track and field athlete, who competed in the sprints events during his career. He is best known for winning the men's 400-meter dash at the 1979 Pan American Games in San Juan.

== Track career ==
Darden had a successful track career for his high school, Norristown High, Pennsylvania; for his university, Arizona State; and for his track club, Philadelphia Pioneers.

At high school, Darden won multiple state championships and achieved national fame by recording national indoor records at 300 and 500 yards.

At Arizona State University, Darden was a key member of the track team, competing in the sprints and sprint relay, and helped the team to their first NCAA Championship in 1977. Also in 1977, Darden was a member of two Arizona State record-breaking relay teams. The first tied the 4×220 yards world best with a time of 1:21.7 in Austin, Texas on April 1 at the Texas Relays. The second broke the world record for the 4×200 metres with a time of 1:21.4 in Philadelphia, Pennsylvania on April 30 at the Penn Relays.

In 1979, Darden having finished second at the USA championships (see below) qualified for the Pan American Games. Willie Smith, as American No. 1, was expected to be the main rival to the legendary Cuban athlete Alberto Juantorena. In the end a foot injury and a problem with a shoe put paid to his chances, and it was an inspired piece of running by Darden that meant it was he who was to beat Juantorena into second.

Darden finished third in 400 m at the 1979 Athletics World Cup and anchored the United States 4 × 400 m relay team to victory. Darden received some criticism for his run in the individual event but ran a superb relay leg to redeem his reputation.

At the 1981 Athletics World Cup, Darden again anchored the United States 4 × 400 m relay team to victory, in a time that was then the third fastest ever. Also in 1981, he won the British AAA Championships title in the 400 metres event at the 1981 AAA Championships.

Darden never ran in an Olympics. As a high-school student he reached the quarter-finals at the United States Olympic Trials in 1976. In 1980 though he finished fifth and so qualified for the 4 × 400 m relay squad but the United States boycotted the 1980 Olympics.

Darden set his personal best (45.01) in the 400 metres on June 21, 1981, in Sacramento.

== Later career ==
As of 2012, Darden was head coach for the Greater Norristown Police Athletic League track and field team.

Darden is USATF level one certified coach.

Between 2000 and 2004, Darden was a member of the Norristown Municipal Council and in 2004 Darden was Norristown Council President.

== Rankings ==
Darden was ranked among the best in the US and the world in the 400 m sprint from 1977 to 1982, according to the votes of the experts of Track and Field News.

400 meters
Year	World rank	US rank
1977	-	6th
1978	-	-
1979	3rd	1st
1980	-	6th
1981	4th	3rd
1982	-	5th

== USA Championships ==
Darden was a very successful competitor at 400 m in the USA National Track and Field Championships between 1977 and 1984:

USA Championships
Year	400m
1977	2nd
1978	-
1979	2nd
1980	2nd
1981	2nd
1982	5th
1983	6th
1984	6th

== Accolades and awards ==
In 2007, Darden was inducted into the Penn Relays 'Wall of Fame'.

Darden had already been inducted into the Penn Relays "Relays’ Wall of Fame" in 1994 as a member of the winning 1977 Arizona State University 4 × 400 m relay team.

In 1989, Darden, along with the rest of the members of the 1977 sprint relay teams, was inducted into the Arizona State University Hall of Fame.

In 1990, Darden was inducted into the Norristown Area School District Hall of Champions.
