= Tamara Sorokina =

Soviet female middle-distance runner

Medal record

Women's athletics

Representing the Soviet Union

World Cup
Gold medal – first place	1981 Rome	1500 m

European Cup
Gold medal – first place	1981 Zagreb	1500 m

European Indoor Championships
Bronze medal – third place	1974 Gothenburg	1500 m

Tamara Aleksandrovna Sorokina (Russian: Тамара Александровна Сорокина; born 15 August 1950) is a Russian former Soviet middle-distance runner who competed in both the 800 metres and the 1500 metres. She set personal bests of 1:56.6 minutes and 3:58.89 minutes for the events, respectively.

Sorokina was the gold medallist at the 1981 IAAF World Cup setting a meet record. She represented the Soviet Union at the 1972 Summer Olympics. At continental level, she was a bronze medallist at the 1974 European Athletics Indoor Championships and the winner of the 1981 European Cup. In her last major performance she was a finalist at the 1982 European Athletics Championships. She was a five-time national champion indoors.

== Career ==
Born Tamara Kazachkova (Russian: Тамара Казачкова) in Kazanovka in the Chelyabinsk Oblast, her first major tournament was the 1972 Summer Olympics in Munich. Aged 22, she failed to progress beyond the first heat of the 800 m. She established herself indoors at national level after this, taking the 1000 metres title in 1973 then the 1500 metres title at the 1974 Soviet Indoor Athletics Championships. She represented the Soviet Union in the latter event at the 1974 European Athletics Indoor Championships and came away with her first international medal, taking the bronze behind Bulgaria's Tonka Petrova and Karin Krebs of East Germany.

The middle period of her career saw her drop in the national rankings, though she continued to improve. In 1976 she set personal bests of 1:58.7 minutes for the 800 m and 4:07.2 minutes for the 1500 m. She did not compete at a high level in the following two years. However, she returned with a new best of 4:06.3 minutes in 1979, marking a resurgence in her form and competing under her married name Tamara Sorokina. She was the second fastest woman of the 1980 indoor season, running 4:07.8 minutes to place behind only Mary Decker of the United States.

Sorokina dipped under four minutes for the 1500 m for the first time in 1980 and ended the year with a best of 3.59.3 minutes, which ranked her eighth globally. She also won the Soviet indoor 1500 m title for a second time. However, such was the strength of the Soviet Union in the event, she did not earn selection for the 1980 Moscow Olympics, while her compatriots Tatyana Kazankina, Nadezhda Olizarenko and Lyubov Smolka all making the Olympic final instead (the former two reaching the podium).

Entering her thirties, the 1981 season proved to be the high point of Sorokina's career. She won an 800 m/1500 m double at the Soviet Indoor Championships. She set personal bests in both events outdoors, running 1:57.55 minutes for the 800 m in August and 3.58.89 minutes for the 1500 m – both these times ranked her fourth in the world for the season. She was the Soviet representative in the 1500 m at the 1981 European Cup and she came away with the gold medal (her first international title), recording a championship record of 4:01.37 minutes to beat East German Olympic medallist Ulrike Bruns. This ensured her place on the national team for the 1981 IAAF World Cup and she again finished ahead of Bruns, as well as future Olympic champion Gabriella Dorio. Her winning time of 4:03.33 minutes was a meet record which stood until 1994, when it was improved by Hassiba Boulmerka.

Sorokina remained highly ranked in the 1982 season, including a lifetime best in the 800 m of 1:56.6 minutes (placing her seventh on the year's rankings). She again ran below four minutes for the 1500 m and her best of 3:59.24 minutes though slower than the previous year was enough to put her in the season's top ten. A Soviet trio of Sorokina, Olga Dvirna and Zamira Zaytseva were entered into the 1500 m for the 1982 European Athletics Championships. Her compatriots took the top two spots, but Sorokina failed to produce her season's best and finished in sixth place. This proved to be the last high-profile international appearance that she made. In her last year of competition in 1983 she ranked sixth in the world for the 1500 m.

== Personal bests ==
- 800 metres: 1:56.6 minutes (1982)
- 1500 metres: 3:58.89 minutes (1981)

== National titles ==
- Soviet Indoor Athletics Championships
  - 800 m: 1981
  - 1000 m: 1973
  - 1500 m: 1974, 1980, 1981

== International competitions ==
Year	Competition	Venue	Position	Event	Notes
1972	Olympic Games	Munich, West Germany	8th (heats)	1500 m	4:20.15
1974	European Indoor Championships	Gothenburg, Sweden	3rd	1500 m	4:14.45
1981	European Cup	Zagreb, Yugoslavia	1st	1500 m	4:01.37
1981	World Cup	Rome, Italy	1st	1500 m	4:03.33
1982	European Championships	Athens, Greece	6th	1500 m	4:01.22
