= Trevor Hoyte (athlete) =

English sprinter

Personal information
- Nationality: British (English)
- Born: 5 January 1957 (age 68) Trinidad
- Height: 182 cm (6 ft 0 in)
- Weight: 76 kg (168 lb)

Sport
- Sport: Athletics
- Event: Sprints
- Club: Thames Valley Harriers

Trevor Simion Hoyte (born 5 January 1957) is a Trinidadian born former sprinter who reprsented England and Great Britain.

== Biography ==
Hoyte represented England in the 200 metres and 4 x 100 metres relay events, at the 1978 Commonwealth Games in Edmonton, Canada.

Hoyte was a British 100 champion after winning the 1979 UK Athletics Championships. The following year he was also considered the British 200 metres champion by virtue of being the highest placed British athlete, after finishing third behind Americans Mel Lattany and Steve Williams in the 200 metres event at the 1980 AAA Championships.

== Personal life ==
He is part of a sporting family. His brother is Les Hoyte (a former international sprinter) and sister in-law is Wendy Hoyte. His nephews are Justin Hoyte and Gavin Hoyte.
