= 1981 IAAF World Cup =

Track and field sporting event

The 3rd IAAF World Cup in Athletics was an international track and field sporting event sponsored by the International Association of Athletics Federations, held on September 4–6, 1981, at the Stadio Olimpico in Rome, Italy.

== Overall results ==
=== Men ===
Pos.	Team	Result
1	Europe	147
2	East Germany	130
3	United States	127
4	Soviet Union	118
5	Americas	95
6	Italy	93
7	Africa	66
8	Oceania	61
9	Asia	59

=== Women ===
Pos.	Team	Result
1	East Germany	120,5
2	Europe	110
3	Soviet Union	98
4	United States	89
5	Americas	72
6	Italy	68,5
7	Oceania	58
8	Asia	32
9	Africa	26

== Medal summary ==
=== Men ===
Event	Gold		Silver		Bronze	
100 metres	Allan Wells (GBR); Europe	10.20	Ernest Obeng (GHA); Africa	10.21	Frank Emmelmann (GDR); East Germany	10.31
200 metres	Mel Lattany (USA); United States	20.21	Allan Wells (GBR); Europe	20.53	Frank Emmelmann (GDR); East Germany	20.57
400 metres	Cliff Wiley (USA); United States	44.88	Mauro Zuliani (ITA); Italy	45.26	Bert Cameron (JAM); Americas	45.27
800 metres	Sebastian Coe (GBR); Europe	1:46.16	James Robinson (USA); United States	1:47.31	Detlef Wagenknecht (GDR); East Germany	1:47.49
1500 metres	Steve Ovett (GBR); Europe	3:34.95	John Walker (NZL); Oceania	3:35.49	Olaf Beyer (GDR); East Germany	3:35.58
5000 metres	Eamonn Coghlan (IRL); Europe	14:08.39	Hansjörg Kunze (GDR); East Germany	14:08.54	Vittorio Fontanella (ITA); Italy	14:09.06
10,000 metres	Werner Schildhauer (GDR); East Germany	27:38.43	Mohamed Kedir (ETH); Africa	27:39.44	Alberto Salazar (USA); United States	27:40.69
110 metre hurdles	Greg Foster (USA); United States	13.32	Alejandro Casañas (CUB); Americas	13.36	Július Ivan (TCH); Europe	13.66
400 metre hurdles	Edwin Moses (USA); United States	47.37	Volker Beck (GDR); East Germany	49.16	Harry Schulting (NED); Europe	49.69
3000 metre steeplechase	Bogusław Mamiński (POL); Europe	8:19.89	Mariano Scartezzini (ITA); Italy	8:19.93	Masanari Shintaku (JPN); Asia	8:23.64
4×100 metre relay	Europe; Krzysztof Zwoliński; Zenon Licznerski; Leszek Dunecki; Marian Woronin	38.73	East Germany; Frank Hollender; Detlef Kübeck; Bernhard Hoff; Frank Emmelmann	38.79	United States; Mel Lattany; Anthony Ketchum; Stanley Floyd; Steve Williams	38.85
4×400 metre relay	United States; Walter McCoy; Cliff Wiley; Willie Smith; Tony Darden	2:59.12	Europe; Eric Josjö; Fons Brijdenbach; Koen Gijsbers; Hartmut Weber	3:01.47	Americas; Héctor Daley; Colin Bradford; Mike Paul; Bert Cameron	3:02.01
High jump	Tyke Peacock (USA); United States	2.28	Gerd Nagel (FRG); Europe	2.26	Jörg Freimuth (GDR); East Germany	2.24
Pole vault	Konstantin Volkov (URS); Soviet Union	5.70	Jean-Michel Bellot (FRA); Europe	5.55	Billy Olson (USA); United States	5.50
Long jump	Carl Lewis (USA); United States	8.15	Gary Honey (AUS); Oceania	8.11	Shamil Abbyasov (URS); Soviet Union	7.95
Triple jump	João Carlos de Oliveira (BRA); Americas	17.37	Zou Zhenxian (CHN); Asia	17.34	Willie Banks (USA); United States	17.04
Shot put	Udo Beyer (GDR); East Germany	21.40	Yevgeniy Mironov (URS); Soviet Union	20.34	Dave Laut (USA); United States	19.90
Discus throw	Armin Lemme (GDR); East Germany	66.38	Luis Delís (CUB); Americas	66.26	Imrich Bugár (TCH); Europe	64.38
Hammer throw	Yuriy Sedykh (URS); Soviet Union	77.42	Karl-Hans Riehm (FRG); Europe	75.60	Giampaolo Urlando (ITA); Italy	71.92
Javelin throw	Dainis Kūla (URS); Soviet Union	89.74	Detlef Michel (GDR); East Germany	89.38	Pentti Sinersaari (FIN); Europe	83.26

=== Women ===
Event	Gold		Silver		Bronze	
100 metres	Evelyn Ashford (USA); United States	11.02	Kathy Smallwood (GBR); Europe	11.10	Marlies Göhr (GDR); East Germany	11.13
200 metres	Evelyn Ashford (USA); United States	22.18	Jarmila Kratochvílová (TCH); Europe	22.31	Bärbel Wöckel (GDR); East Germany	22.41
400 metres	Jarmila Kratochvílová (TCH); Europe	48.61	Marita Koch (GDR); East Germany	49.27	Jackie Pusey (JAM); Americas	51.48
800 metres	Lyudmila Veselkova (URS); Soviet Union	1:57.48	Martina Steuk (GDR); East Germany	1:58.31	Jolanta Januchta (POL); Europe	1:58.32
1500 metres	Tamara Sorokina (URS); Soviet Union	4:03.33	Gabriella Dorio (ITA); Italy	4:03.75	Ulrike Bruns (GDR); East Germany	4:04.67
3000 metres	Angelika Zauber (GDR); East Germany	8:54.89	Maricica Puică (ROU); Europe	8:55.80	Silvana Cruciata (ITA); Italy	8:57.10
100 metre hurdles	Tatyana Anisimova (URS); Soviet Union	12.85	Kerstin Knabe (GDR); East Germany	12.91	Lucyna Langer (POL); Europe	12.97
400 metre hurdles	Ellen Neumann (GDR); East Germany	54.82	Genowefa Błaszak (POL); Europe	56.20	Anna Kastetskaya (URS); Soviet Union	56.37
4×100 metre relay	East Germany; Kirsten Siemon; Bärbel Wöckel; Gesine Walther; Marlies Göhr	42.22	United States; Alice Brown; Jeanette Bolden; Florence Griffith; Evelyn Ashford	42.82	Soviet Union; Olga Zolotaryova; Olga Nasonova; Lyudmila Kondratyeva; Natalya Bochina	43.01
4×400 metre relay	East Germany; Dagmar Rübsam; Martina Steuk; Bärbel Wöckel; Marita Koch	3:20.62	Europe; Michelle Scutt; Verona Elder; Joslyn Hoyte-Smith; Jarmila Kratochvílová	3:23.03	Americas; Charmaine Crooks; Jackie Pusey; Marita Payne; June Griffith	3:26.42
High jump	Ulrike Meyfarth (FRG); Europe	1.96	Tamara Bykova (URS); Soviet Union	1.96	Pam Spencer (USA); United States	1.92
Long jump	Sigrid Ulbricht (GDR); East Germany	6.80	Jodi Anderson (USA); United States	6.61	Anna Włodarczyk (POL); Europe	6.59
Shot put	Ilona Slupianek (GDR); East Germany	20.60	Helena Fibingerová (TCH); Europe	19.92	María Elena Sarría (CUB); Americas	19.21
Discus throw	Evelin Jahl (GDR); East Germany	66.70	Mariya Petkova (BUL); Europe	66.30	Galina Savinkova (URS); Soviet Union	63.96
Javelin throw	Antoaneta Todorova (BUL); Europe	70.08	Petra Felke (GDR); East Germany	66.60	Karin Smith (USA); United States	63.04
