= Marian Woronin =

Polish sprinter (born 1956)

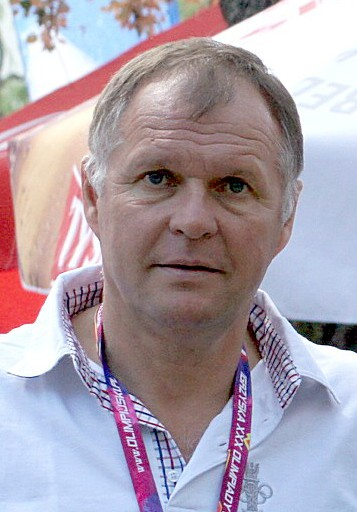
- Marian Woronin 2012.

Medal record

Men's athletics

Representing Poland
Event	1st	2nd	3rd
Olympic Games	0	1	0
World Championships	0	0	0
World Indoor Championships	0	0	0
European Indoor Championships	5	0	1
World Cup	1	0	2
European Cup	3	1	1
Total	10	2	3

Olympic Games
Silver medal – second place	1980 Moscow	4 × 100 m relay

European Championships
Gold medal – first place	1978 Prague	4 × 100 m relay
Bronze medal – third place	1982 Athens	100 m

European Indoor Championships
Gold medal – first place	1979 Vienna	60 m
Gold medal – first place	1980 Sindelfingen	60 m
Gold medal – first place	1981 Grenoble	50 m
Gold medal – first place	1982 Milan	60 m
Gold medal – first place	1987 Liévin	60 m
Bronze medal – third place	1977 San Sebastián	60 m

European Cup
Gold medal – first place	1979 Turin	4 × 100 m relay
Gold medal – first place	1981 Zurich	4 × 100 m relay
Gold medal – first place	1985 Moscow	100 m
Silver medal – second place	1979 Turin	100 m
Bronze medal – third place	1979 Turin	200 m

Representing Europe

World Cup
Gold medal – first place	1981 Rome	4 × 100 m relay
Bronze medal – third place	1979 Montreal	4 × 100 m relay
Bronze medal – third place	1979 Montreal	100 m

Marian Jerzy Woronin (born 13 August 1956 in Grodzisk Mazowiecki) is a retired Polish athlete who competed mainly in the 100 metres. He is a four-time European Indoor Champion in the 60 metres. He won nine Polish outdoor titles, and nine indoor titles.

== Career ==
His first major medal came at the 1978 European Athletics Championships, where he anchored the Polish 4 × 100 metres relay team of Zenon Nowosz, Zenon Licznerski and Leszek Dunecki to the gold medal in the event. He won the bronze in the 100 m at the 1979 IAAF World Cup, running for Europe.

He competed for Poland in the 1980 Summer Olympics held in Moscow, Soviet Union in the 100 and 200 he reached both finals finishing seventh in both sprints. In the 4 × 100 metres relay he won the silver medal with his teammates Krzysztof Zwoliński, Licznerski and Dunecki.

In 1981 he ran with the Polish/Europe sprint relay team that won the gold at the 1981 IAAF World Cup in Rome. He won a bronze in the 100 metres at the 1982 European Athletics Championships.

His fastest time for the 100 m was 10.00 seconds, recorded in 1984 in Warsaw with wind on the maximum allowable limit of 2.0 m/s. This was the European record for the event until Linford Christie ran 9.97 sec at the 1988 Seoul Olympics. Although Woronin's official timing read as 10.00 seconds, this was rounded up from 9.992 seconds – so this represents the first time that a Caucasian (and a European) broke the 10-second barrier in this event, albeit unofficially.

Woronin's personal best in the 200 m was 20.49.

== International competitions ==
Representing Poland & Europe
Year	Competition	Venue	Position	Event	Result	Notes
1974	European Championships	Rome, Italy	19th (h)	100 m	10.77	
1974	European Championships	Rome, Italy	25th (h)	200 m	21.60	
1975	European Indoor Championships	Katowice, Poland	4th	60 m	6.76	
1975	European Junior Championships	Athens, Greece	3rd	100 m	10.55	
1975	European Junior Championships	Athens, Greece	6th	200 m	21.65	
1975	European Junior Championships	Athens, Greece	4th	4 × 100 m	40.57	
1976	Olympic Games	Montreal, Canada	16th (sf)	100 m	10.69	
1976	Olympic Games	Montreal, Canada	29th (h)	200 m	21.90	
1976	Olympic Games	Montreal, Canada	4th	4 × 100 m	38.83	
1977	European Indoor Championships	San Sebastián, Spain	3rd	60 m	6.67	
1978	European Indoor Championships	Milan, Italy	4th	60 m	6.75	
1978	European Championships	Prague, Czechoslovakia	9th (sf)	100 m	10.54	
1978	European Championships	Prague, Czechoslovakia	1st	4 × 100 m	38.58	
1979	European Indoor Championships	Vienna, Austria	1st	60 m	6.57	
1979	World Cup	Montreal, Canada	3rd	100 m	10.28	Europe
1979	World Cup	Montreal, Canada	3rd	4 × 100 m	38.85	Europe
1980	European Indoor Championships	Sindelfingen, West Germany	1st	60 m	6.62	
1980	Olympic Games	Moscow, Soviet Union	7th	100 m	10.46	
1980	Olympic Games	Moscow, Soviet Union	7th	200 m	20.81	
1980	Olympic Games	Moscow, Soviet Union	2nd	4 × 100 m	38.33	
1981	European Indoor Championships	Grenoble, France	1st	50 m	5.65	
1981	World Cup	Rome, Italy	1st	4 × 100 m	38.73	Europe
1982	European Indoor Championships	Milan, Italy	1st	60 m	6.61	
1982	European Championships	Athens, Greece	3rd	100 m	10.28	
1982	European Championships	Athens, Greece	5th	4 × 100 m	39.00	
1983	World Championships	Helsinki, Finland	31st (qf)	100 m	10.72	
1983	World Championships	Helsinki, Finland	6th	4 × 100 m	38.72	
1984	Friendship Games	Moscow, Soviet Union	16th (h)	100 m	10.66	
1984	Friendship Games	Moscow, Soviet Union	3rd	4 × 100 m	38.81	
1985	World Cup	Canberra, Australia	7th	100 m	10.45	Europe
1986	European Championships	Stuttgart, West Germany	–	100 m	DNF	
1987	European Indoor Championships	Liévin, France	1st	60 m	6.51	

Records
Preceded by (Italy) Pietro Mennea	European Record Holder Men's 100 m 9 June 1984 - 23 September 1988	Succeeded by (United Kingdom) Linford Christie
