= Allan Wells =

Scottish sprinter

Allan Wells MBE
Personal information
- Born: 3 May 1952 (age 74) Edinburgh, Midlothian, Scotland

Sport
- Events: 100 metres 200 metres
Medal record
Men's athletics
Representing Great Britain
Olympic Games
Gold medal – first place	1980 Moscow	100 metres
Silver medal – second place	1980 Moscow	200 metres
IAAF World Cup
Gold medal – first place	1981 Rome	100 m
Silver medal – second place	1981 Rome	200 m
European Cup
Gold medal – first place	1979 Turin	200 m
Gold medal – first place	1981 Zagreb	100 m
Gold medal – first place	1983 London	200 m
Silver medal – second place	1981 Zagreb	200 m
Silver medal – second place	1983 London	100 m
Bronze medal – third place	1979 Turin	100 m
Representing Scotland
Commonwealth Games
Gold medal – first place	1978 Edmonton	200 m
Gold medal – first place	1978 Edmonton	4 × 100 m
Gold medal – first place	1982 Brisbane	100 m
Gold medal – first place	1982 Brisbane	200 m
Silver medal – second place	1978 Edmonton	100 m
Bronze medal – third place	1982 Brisbane	4 × 100 m

Allan Wipper Wells (born 3 May 1952) is a Scottish former track and field sprinter who became the 100 metres Olympic champion for Great Britain at the 1980 Summer Olympics in Moscow. In 1981, he was both the IAAF Golden Sprints and IAAF World Cup gold medallist. He is also a three-time European Cup gold medallist.

Wells was a multiple medallist for Scotland at the Commonwealth Games, winning two golds at the 1978 Commonwealth Games and completing a 100 metres/200 metres sprint double at the 1982 Commonwealth Games. He also recorded the fastest British 100/200 times from 1978–1983 and the fastest 100 m in 1984.

== Biography ==
=== Early years and long jump ===
Born in Edinburgh, Wells was educated at Fernieside Primary School and then Liberton High School. He left school at age 15 to begin an engineering apprenticeship. He was initially a triple jumper and long jumper, and was the Scottish indoor long jump champion in 1974.

=== Commonwealth and European sprint titles ===
He began concentrating on sprint events in 1976 and developed a powerful physique. In 1977 he won the Amateur Athletic Association (AAA) Indoor 60 metres title, and won his first of seven outdoor Scottish sprint titles.

In the 1978 season, his times and victories continued to improve. He set a new British record at Gateshead 10.29, beating Don Quarrie and James Sanford, and also won the UK 100/200 Championships.

At the Commonwealth Games in Edmonton, Alberta, Canada, he won the gold medal in the 200 m and silver in the 100 m. He also won the 4 × 100 m running the second leg with Drew McMaster, David Jenkins and Cameron Sharp running the other three legs.

This success continued in 1979, when he won the European Cup 200 metres in Turin, Italy, beating the new world record holder Pietro Mennea on his home ground; he also finished 3rd in the 100 metres.

=== 1980 – Olympic success and the Koblenz showdown ===
At the start of the 1980 season, Wells won the AAA's 100 metres. He then went to the Côte d'Azur to finish preparing for the 1980 Summer Olympics in Moscow. He never used starting blocks, until a rule change forced him to do so for the Olympics.

Margaret Thatcher pressured Wells to join the American led, 1980 Summer Olympics boycott. In response he declined all media requests.

His Olympic participation was threatened by chronic back pain that struck him shortly before the games began. Each day, he underwent four exhausting treatment sessions that left him too tired to train. Instead, when not undergoing treatment, he spent his time relaxing.

In Moscow, Wells qualified for the final, with a new British record 10.11 s. In the final he finished with an extreme lean, allowing his head and shoulder to cross the finish line 3 inches (76 mm) before Silvio Leonard's chest in a photo finish; both men were given a final time of 10.25 s. Aged 28 years and 83 days, Wells was the oldest Olympic 100 m gold medalist at that time.

He won the 200 m silver medal 0.02 s behind Pietro Mennea. Again Wells set a British record, 20.21 s. He then set a third British record, 38.62 s, as part of the team finishing fourth in the 4 x 100 m relay final.

He later told The Scotsman, that the two issues he faced prior to the games were inadvertently key success factors: "When we got to Moscow, [my wife and coach] Margot and I decided that I'd do six starts and see how it went. The fourth and fifth were full-out as if I was competing and I asked Margot what she thought: she said they were the best she'd ever seen me do. The rest had done me a lot of good, I was really fresh and committed, and those starts gave me the psychological edge over everyone else, which was key because the Olympics is all about your mental aptitude. You're at your fastest when you're relaxed and flowing (Wells' 10.11secs to qualify for the 100m final remains the Scottish record) rather than having to be aggressive."

Afterwards, some suggested that the games boycott devalued Wells's Olympic gold. He accepted an invite to race the best USA sprinters of the day, among others, at the ASV Weltklasse track meeting in Koblenz, West Germany. Less than two weeks after his Moscow gold, Wells won the final in Koblenz in 10.19 secs, beating Americans Stanley Floyd (10.21), Mel Lattany (10.25), Carl Lewis (10.30) and Harvey Glance (10.31). Lattany went straight to Wells after crossing the line to say, "For what it's worth, Allan, You're the Olympic champion and you would have been Olympic champion no matter who you ran against in Moscow."

At the end of 1980, Wells was awarded Scottish Sports Personality of the Year.

=== 1981 World Cup win ===
In 1981, after a tour of Australia and New Zealand, Wells won the European Cup 100 metres, beating East German Frank Emmelmann. Wells also finished 2nd in the 200 m.

He then won the "IAAF Golden sprints" in Berlin, which was the most prominent sprint meeting in the world that year. Although finishing second to the Frenchman Hermann Panzo by 0.01 secs in the 100, Wells won the 200 beating the top four American sprinters Mel Lattany, Jeff Phillips, Stanley Floyd, Steve Williams as well as Canada's Ben Johnson in the 100/200, 10.15/20.15 (200 wind assist) for Wells to win the event in an aggregate 30.30.

Wells won the 100 metres at the IAAF World cup in Rome, beating Carl Lewis; Wells then finished 2nd in the world cup 200 in 20.53. Afterwards, he beat Mel Lattany and Stanley Floyd again, when he won a 200 in 20.26 in the Memorial Van Damme meeting in Brussels, Belgium.

=== Later sprinting career ===
In 1982, in Brisbane, Queensland, Australia, Wells won two more Commonwealth Games titles in the 100 m, a wind-assisted 10.02. and then the 200 m, and a bronze medal in the relay. He shared the 200 m title with Mike McFarlane of England in 20.43 in a rare dead heat.

In 1983, he won his third European Cup title by winning the 200 metres in 20.72, beating his old adversary Pietro Mennea in London, and again took 2nd in the 100 m.

He then finished 4th in both the 100/200 sprint finals at the IAAF World Championships in Helsinki.

At age 32, he reached the 100 m semi-finals at the 1984 Los Angeles Olympics, and was a member of the relay team that finished 7th in the final.

Wells missed most of 1985 with injury. He was not selected for the Commonwealth Games in Edinburgh in 1986, as he had failed to compete at the Scottish trials. However, on 5 August at Gateshead, he beat both Ben Johnson and Atlee Mahorn, the respective Commonwealth 100 m and 200 m champions.

Wells gained additional attention at Gateshead for being the first to be seen sporting the now common Lycra running shorts. The sight of these led to him being dubbed Wilson of the Wizard (a comic book character).

Wells was consequently selected for Stuttgart in the European championships, coming fifth in both the 100 m and 200 m finals. He also had a victory against Linford Christie at Crystal Palace at the end of 1986 in 100 m at 10.31. One of his last victories was winning the Inverness Highland Games 100/200 double in 1987. In 1987 his best time was 10.28 and he qualified for the Rome World Championships but he was injured.

Although his later career was plagued by repeated back injuries, he still won a career total of 18 medals at major championships before retiring in his mid-30s. He and Don Quarrie and Pietro Mennea set a trend for sprinters in their mid thirties to compete longer in the late Eighties.

=== After competitive retirement ===
Since 1982 Wells has lived in Surrey, with his wife Margot. After retirement, he was a coach for the British bobsleigh team. Margot was also a Scottish 100/100 hurdles champion. They are now based in Guildford, Surrey where she is a fitness consultant, and Allan is a retired systems engineer. Allan coached the Bank of Scotland specialist sprint squad alongside another former Scottish sprinter, Ian Mackie.

Wells's personal best for the 100 metres is 10.11, and for the 200 metres is 20.21, run at the Moscow 1980 games, and both are still Scottish records.

He also ran a wind-assisted (+5.9 m/s) 10.02 in Brisbane, 1982 (still the track record as of August 2024 which he shares with Rohan Browning of Sydney, Australia from April 2023), and (+3.7 m/s) 20.11 in Edinburgh, 1980.

In June 2015, a BBC documentary (Panorama: Catch Me If You Can) uncovered allegations by Wells' former teammate of historical doping by the 1980 Olympic 100 m champion, beginning in 1977. Wells denied the allegations.

As of August 2024, Wells holds two track records for 200 metres, both of which had wind-assistance. They are Turin (20.29, 1979, +2.2 m/s) and Venice (20.26, 1981, +8.5 m/s).

== Honours and awards ==
Wells was appointed Member of the Order of the British Empire (MBE) in the 1982 Birthday Honours for services to athletics. He was also inducted alongside Eric Liddell and Wyndham Halswelle (two other former Scottish Athletic Olympic Champions) into the Scottish Sports Hall of Fame.

Wells was the first baton holder for the Queen's Baton Relay for the 2014 Commonwealth Games, carrying the baton from Buckingham Palace in London in October 2013.

In July 2014, Wells received, along with his wife Margot, an Honorary Doctorate of Science from Edinburgh Napier University.
