= Danny Roelandt =

Belgian sprinter

Personal information
- Nationality: Belgian
- Born: 5 November 1955 (age 70)

Sport
- Sport: Sprinting
- Event: 4 × 400 metres relay

Danny Roelandt (born 5 November 1955) is a Belgian sprinter. He competed in the men's 4 × 400 metres relay at the 1980 Summer Olympics.
