= Svetlana Melnikova =

Russian discus thrower and shot putter

Personal information
- Born: 29 January 1951 (age 75)

Sport
- Sport: Track and field
Medal record
Representing Soviet Union
Summer Universiade
Gold medal – first place	1979 Mexico City	Discus throw
Silver medal – second place	1977 Sofia	Discus throw

Svetlana Melnikova (Russian: Светлана Мельникова; born 29 January 1951) is a retired female discus thrower and shot putter, who represented the Soviet Union during her career. Melnikova is best known for winning the gold medal in the women's discus throw event at the 1979 Summer Universiade in Mexico City, Mexico.
