= Pascal Barré =

French sprinter (born 1959)

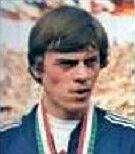
- Pascal Barré in 1979

Personal information
- Born: 12 April 1959 (age 67) Houilles, Yvelines
Medal record
Men's athletics
Representing France
Olympic Games
Bronze medal – third place	1980 Moscow	4 × 100 metres relay
Summer Universiade
Bronze medal – third place	1979 Mexico City	4 × 100 metres relay

Pascal Barré (born 12 April 1959 in Houilles, Yvelines) is a former track and field athlete from France. He competed mainly in the 100 metres and 200 metres sprint events.

== Athletic career ==
Barré was a bronze medallist in the 200 metres event at the 1977 European Athletics Junior Championships. He was French 200 metre champion on three occasions, and twice indoor 200 metre champion. He also won the indoor 400 metre French title.

In 1986, he reached the semi-final of the 200 metres at the European championships in Stuttgart, Germany.

He competed for France in the 1980 Summer Olympics held in Moscow, Soviet Union. He did not run the 200 metres as he was scheduled, but ran in the 4 × 100 metres relay, where he won the bronze medal with his team mates Antoine Richard, Patrick Barré (his twin brother) and Hermann Panzo.
