= Werner Bastians =

German sprinter

Personal information
- Nationality: German
- Born: 2 February 1957 (age 69)

Sport
- Sport: Sprinting
- Event: 100 metres

Werner Bastians (born 2 February 1957) is a German sprinter. He competed in the men's 100 metres at the 1976 Summer Olympics representing West Germany.
