= Leszek Dunecki =

Polish sprinter (born 1956)

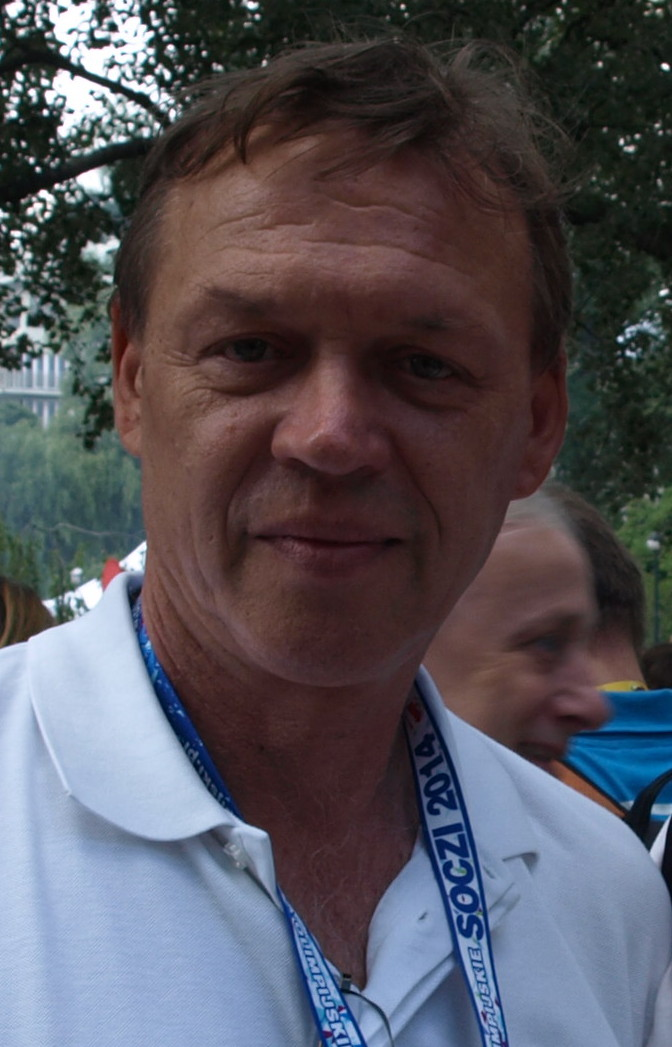

Personal information
- Born: 2 October 1956 (age 69)
Medal record
Men's athletics
Representing Poland
Olympic Games
Silver medal – second place	1980 Moscow	4 × 100 m relay
European Championships
Gold medal – first place	1978 Prague	4 × 100 m relay
European Indoor Championships
Silver medal – second place	1979 Vienna	60 m
European Cup
Gold medal – first place	1979 Turin	4 × 100 m relay
Gold medal – first place	1981 Zurich	4 × 100 m relay
Universiade
Silver medal – second place	1979 Mexico City	100 m
Silver medal – second place	1979 Mexico City	200 m
Representing Europe
IAAF World Cup
Gold medal – first place	1981 Rome	4 × 100 m relay
Silver medal – second place	1979 Montreal	200 m
Bronze medal – third place	1979 Montreal	4 × 100 m relay

Leszek Ryszard Dunecki (born 2 October 1956 in Toruń) was a Polish athlete who competed mainly in the 100 and 200 metres. He was the Polish champion on 6 occasions.

He won a European Championship Gold medal in 1978 in the 4 × 100 metres.

In 1979, was world student 100/200 runner up. Finishing 2nd only behind Pietro Mennea who ran the then new world record 19.72. Dunecki ran 20.26. Dunecki's Polish national record of 20.26 was improved in 1999, by Marcin Urbas (19.98 s), after 20 years.

He competed for Poland in the 1980 Summer Olympics held in Moscow, Soviet Union in the 100 where he reached the Quarter final, and the 200 metres where he reached the final and finished 6th. He also competed in the 4 × 100 metre relay where he won the silver medal with his teammates Krzysztof Zwoliński, Zenon Licznerski and Marian Woronin. In 1981 he was a member of the Polish/Europe 4 × 100 relay team that finished 1st in the world cup.

== See also ==
- Polish records in athletics
