= Andrey Shlyapnikov =

Soviet sprinter

Personal information
- Full name: Andrey Vadimovich Shlyapnikov
- Nationality: Soviet
- Born: 13 January 1959 (age 67) Kostroma, Soviet Union

Sport
- Sport: Sprinting
- Event: 100 metres
Medal record
Men's athletics
Representing Soviet Union
European Championships
Gold medal – first place	1986 Stuttgart	4 x 100 m relay
European Indoor Championships
Bronze medal – third place	1981 Grenoble	50 m
Summer Universiade
Silver medal – second place	1981 Bucharest	4 x 100 m relay

Andrey Vadimovich Shlyapnikov (Russian: Андрей Вадимович Шляпников; born 13 January 1959) is a former Soviet sprinter. He competed in the men's 100 metres at the 1980 Summer Olympics.
