= Hermann Panzo =

French sprinter (1958–1999)

Personal information
- Born: February 8, 1958
- Died: July 30, 1999 (aged 41)
Medal record
Men's Athletics
Representing France
Olympic Games
Bronze medal – third place	1980 Moscow	4 x 100 metres relay
European Cup
Bronze medal – third place	1981 Zagreb	100 metres
Bronze medal – third place	1981 Zagreb	4×100 metres
European Junior Championships
Gold medal – first place	1977 Donetsk	100 metres
Gold medal – first place	1977 Donetsk	4×100 metres
Representing France
CARIFTA Games Junior (U20)
Gold medal – first place	1977 Bridgetown	100 metres

Hermann Panzo (February 8, 1958 – July 30, 1999, in Fort de France, Martinique) was a French athlete who mainly competed in the 100 metres. He was twice French 100 metres champion.

In 1977, he won the gold medal of the 100 metres in the junior European championship. He established a new European record on the 100 metres for the juniors (10"40). In 1977 too, he beat the European junior record for the relay 4 x 100 metres (39"69).

He competed for France at the 1980 Summer Olympics held in Moscow, Soviet Union. He was finalist in the 100 metres where he finished 8th and, in the 4 x 100 metre relay, he won the bronze medal with his team mates Antoine Richard, Pascal Barré and Patrick Barré.

In 1981 he finished 3rd in the European cup 100 metres, but afterwards he won the 100 metres of the "Golden sprint" (Berlin, ISTAF 08/21), which was the most important competition of the year. In 10"14, he beat the Olympic champion Allan Wells (10.15) and the best American sprinters (Philips 10.21, Latteny 10.25, and Floyd 10.34). For the anecdote, we can mention that Panzo also beat the Canadian sprinter Ben Johnson on that run.

He died on July 30, 1999, of a cerebral vascular accident.
