= Aleksandr Aksinin =

Soviet sprinter (1954–2020)

Personal information
- Born: 4 November 1954 Leningrad, Russian SFSR, Soviet Union
- Died: 28 July 2020 (aged 65)

Sport
- Sport: Track and field
Medal record
Men's athletics
Representing Soviet Union
Olympic Games
Gold medal – first place	1980 Moscow	4×100 m relay
Bronze medal – third place	1976 Montreal	4×100 m relay
European Championships
Gold medal – first place	1982 Athens	4×100 m relay
Bronze medal – third place	1978 Prague	4×100 m relay
European Indoor Championships
Silver medal – second place	1975 Katowice	60 m
Bronze medal – third place	1978 Milan	60 m
Bronze medal – third place	1980 Sindelfingen	60 m
Summer Universiade
Gold medal – first place	1977 Sofia	4×100 m relay
Silver medal – second place	1981 Bucharest	4×100 m relay

Aleksandr Timofeyevich Aksinin (Russian: Александр Тимофеевич Аксинин, 4 November 1954 – 28 July 2020) was a Russian athlete and gold medal winner of the 4 × 100 m relay at the 1980 Summer Olympics.

Aleksandr Aksinin trained at Dynamo in Leningrad. At the 1976 Summer Olympics he won the bronze medal as a member of Soviet 4 × 100 m relay team. He won silver in 1975, bronze in 1978 and 1980 European Indoor Championships in Athletics. At the 1978 European Championships in Athletics, he was seventh in 200 m and won again bronze medal as a member of Soviet 4 × 100 m relay team. Aksinin also won gold in 4 × 100 m relay event of the 1977 Summer Universiade.

At the Moscow Olympics, Aksinin was fourth in the 100 m final and ran the third leg in the gold medal-winning Soviet 4 × 100 m relay team. Aksinin ended his running career after the 1982 European Championships in Athletics, where he won the gold medal in 4 × 100 m relay.

Aksinin died 28 July 2020, aged 65.
