= Nikolay Kolesnikov (sprinter) =

Soviet sprinter

Personal information
- Born: 8 September 1953 (age 72) Almaty, Soviet Union

Sport
- Sport: Track and field
Medal record
Representing Soviet Union
European Championships
Bronze medal – third place	1978 Prague	4×100 m relay
European Indoor Championships
Gold medal – first place	1978 Milan	60 m
Summer Universiade
Gold medal – first place	1975 Rome	4x100 m relay
Gold medal – first place	1977 Sofia	4x100 m relay

Nikolay Vasilyevich Kolesnikov (Russian: Никола́й Васильевич Коле́сников; born 8 September 1953 in Kargaly, Almaty, Kazakh SSR) is a retired 100 metres runner who represented the USSR. He won a bronze medal at the 1976 Summer Olympics as well as the 60 metres at the 1978 European Indoor Championships. Kolesnikov trained at Burevestnik in Leningrad.

== Achievements ==
Year	Competition	Venue	Position	Event	Notes
Representing Soviet Union
1976	Olympic Games	Montreal, Canada	3rd	4 × 100 m relay	
1978	European Indoor Championships	Milan, Italy	1st	60 metres	
