= Jean-Claude Amoureux =

French sprinter

Personal information
- Nationality: French
- Born: 4 March 1956 (age 70) Toulon, France

Sport
- Sport: Sprinting
- Event: 100 metres

Jean-Claude Amoureux (born 4 March 1956) is a French sprinter. He competed in the men's 100 metres at the 1976 Summer Olympics.
