= Krzysztof Zwoliński =

Polish sprinter

Personal information
- Born: 2 January 1959 (age 67) Krapkowice, Poland
Medal record
Men's Athletics
Representing Poland
Olympic Games
Silver medal – second place	1980 Moscow	4x100 m relay
Representing Europe
World Cup
Gold medal – first place	1981 Rome	4x100 m relay

Krzysztof Zwoliński (born 2 January 1959 in Krapkowice) was a Polish athlete who competed mainly in the 100 metres. He was a Polish 60 metre indoor champion in 1986.

He competed for Poland at the 1980 Summer Olympics held in Moscow, Soviet Union where he won the silver medal in the men's 4 x 100 metre relay event with his teammates Zenon Licznerski, Leszek Dunecki and Marian Woronin.

He also competed in the 100 metres but did not qualify through the quarter finals.

== See also ==
- Polish records in athletics
