= Patrick Barré =

French sprinter (born 1959)

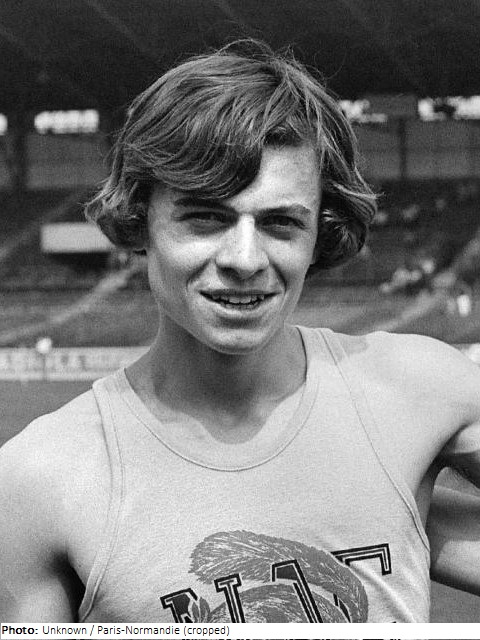

Personal information
- Born: 12 April 1959 (age 67)
Medal record
Men's athletics
Representing France
Olympic Games
Bronze medal – third place	1980 Moscow	4 x 100 metre relay

Patrick Barré (born 12 April 1959 in Houilles, Yvelines) is a former athlete from France who competed mainly in the 100 metres.

He competed for France in the 1980 Summer Olympics held in Moscow, Soviet Union, in the 4 x 100 metre relay, where he won the bronze medal with his teammates Antoine Richard, Pascal Barré (his twin brother) and Hermann Panzo.
