= Josep Carbonell =

Spanish sprinter (born 1957)

Personal information
- Born: 27 January 1957 (age 69) Catalonia, Spain

Sport
- Sport: Track and field
Medal record
Representing Spain
European Junior Championships
Bronze medal – third place	1975 Athens	4x100m relay
Mediterranean Games
Bronze medal – third place	1975 Algiers	4x100m relay

Josep Carbonell Rodès (also given as José, born 27 January 1957) is a retired Spanish sprinter who specialized in the 60 metres.

As a junior he won a bronze medal in the 4 x 100 metres relay at the 1975 European Junior Championships. He competed in the 60 metres at the 1976, 1977, 1978, 1980, 1981 (50 metres), and 1982 European Indoor Championships without reaching the final.

He became the Spanish 100 metres champion in 1975 and 1981, rivalling with Javier Martínez, Ángel Ibáñez, José Luis Sarriá and José Luis Sánchez. He also became the Spanish 60 metres champion in 1975, 1979, 1980 and 1981.

His personal best times were 6.69 seconds in the 60 metres, achieved at the 1982 European Indoor Championships in Milan; and 10.42 seconds in the 100 metres, achieved at the 1981 Spanish Championships in Barcelona.
