= Zenon Licznerski =

Polish sprinter (born 1954)

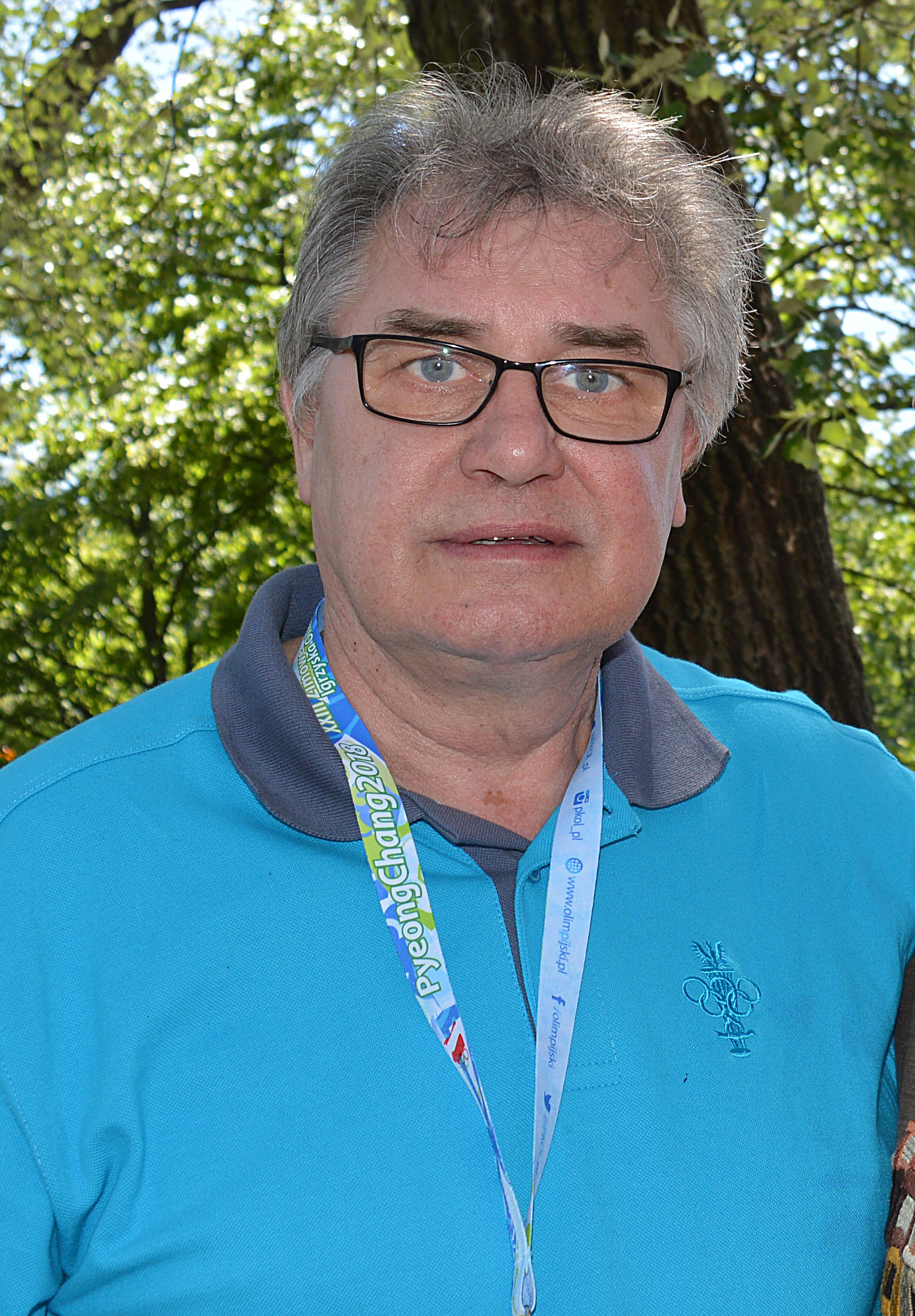
- Licznerski in 2017

Personal information
- Born: 27 November 1954 (age 71)
Medal record
Men's Athletics
Representing Poland
Olympic Games
Silver medal – second place	1980 Moscow	4 × 100 m relay
European Championships
Gold medal – first place	1978 Prague	4 × 100 m relay
European Indoor Championships
Bronze medal – third place	1975 Katowice	60 metres
Representing Europe
World Cup
Gold medal – first place	1981 Rome	4 × 100 m relay

Zenon Licznerski (born 27 November 1954 in Elbląg) is a Polish former athlete who competed mainly in the 100 metres.

He was Polish 100/200 metre champion in 1976, 77.

He was a member of the Polish sprint relay team that won Gold in the European championship.

He competed for Poland in the 1980 Summer Olympics held in Moscow, Soviet Union he competed in the 200 metres, where he reached the quarter final. Afterward he was a member in the 4 × 100 metre relay where he won the silver medal with his teammates Krzysztof Zwoliński, Leszek Dunecki and Marian Woronin.

== See also ==
- Polish records in athletics
