= 1982 European Athletics Championships – Men's 200 metres =

Men's 200 metres at the 1982 European Athletics Championships
- Venue: Olympic Stadium "Spiros Louis"
- Location: Athens
- Dates: 8 September (heats & semi-finals); 9 September (final)
- Competitors: 24 from 14 nations
- Winning time: 20.46

Medalists
gold medal	Olaf Prenzler	East Germany
silver medal	Cameron Sharp	Great Britain
bronze medal	Frank Emmelmann	East Germany

These are the official results of the Men's 200 metres event at the 1982 European Championships in Athens, Greece, held at Olympic Stadium "Spiros Louis" on 8 and 9 September 1982.

== Participation ==
According to an unofficial count, 24 athletes from 14 countries participated in the event.

- Bulgaria (1)
- Czechoslovakia (2)
- East Germany (3)
- Finland (1)
- France (3)
- Great Britain (1)
- Hungary (2)
- Italy (3)
- Poland (1)
- Soviet Union (2)
- Spain (1)
- Sweden (1)
- Switzerland (1)
- West Germany (2)

== Results ==
=== Heats ===
8 September

==== Heat 1 ====
Rank	Name	Nationality	Time	Notes
1	Frank Emmelmann	East Germany	20.87	Q
2	Cameron Sharp	Great Britain	20.96	Q
3	Pascal Barré	France	21.09	Q
4	Luciano Caravani	Italy	21.25	q
5	Stanislav Sajdok	Czechoslovakia	21.29	q
6	László Babály	Hungary	21.39	
			Wind: -0.1 m/s	

==== Heat 2 ====
Rank	Name	Nationality	Time	Notes
1	Hermann Lomba	France	20.90	Q
2	István Nagy	Hungary	21.00	Q
3	Detlef Kübeck	East Germany	21.03	Q
4	Sergey Sokolov	Soviet Union	21.15	q
5	Peter Klein	West Germany	21.32	
6	Zenon Licznerski	Poland	21.36	
7	Peter Muster	Switzerland	31.10	
			Wind: -0.8 m/s	

==== Heat 3 ====
Rank	Name	Nationality	Time	Notes
1	Vladimir Muravyov	Soviet Union	20.96	Q
2	Giovanni Bongiorni	Italy	21.02	Q
3	Olaf Prenzler	East Germany	21.13	Q
4	Kimmo Saaristo	Finland	21.38	
5	Per-Ola Olsson	Sweden	21.72	
			Wind: -0.2 m/s	

==== Heat 4 ====
Rank	Name	Nationality	Time	Notes
1	Pascal Barré	France	21.03	Q
2	Erwin Skamrahl	West Germany	21.04	Q
3	František Břečka	Czechoslovakia	21.11	Q
4	Carlo Simionato	Italy	21.25	q
5	Ángel Heras	Spain	21.37	
6	Nikolay Markov	Bulgaria	21.73	
			Wind: +0.6 m/s	

=== Semi-finals ===
8 September

==== Heat 1 ====
Rank	Name	Nationality	Time	Notes
1	Frank Emmelmann	East Germany	20.80	Q
2	István Nagy	Hungary	20.82	Q
3	Patrick Barré	France	20.93	Q
4	Vladimir Muravyov	Soviet Union	20.95	Q
5	Pascal Barré	France	20.99	
6	Carlo Simionato	Italy	21.04	
7	František Břečka	Czechoslovakia	21.17	
8	Luciano Caravani	Italy	21.24	
			Wind: -1.1 m/s	

==== Heat 2 ====
Rank	Name	Nationality	Time	Notes
1	Olaf Prenzler	East Germany	20.58	Q
2	Erwin Skamrahl	West Germany	20.61	Q
3	Cameron Sharp	Great Britain	20.62	Q
4	Sergey Sokolov	Soviet Union	20.68	Q
5	Detlef Kübeck	East Germany	20.80	
6	Hermann Lomba	France	20.82	
7	Giovanni Bongiorni	Italy	21.04	
8	Stanislav Sajdok	Czechoslovakia	21.17	
			Wind: +0.7 m/s	

=== Final ===
9 September

Rank	Name	Nationality	Time	Notes
1st place, gold medalist(s)	Olaf Prenzler	East Germany	20.46	
2nd place, silver medalist(s)	Cameron Sharp	Great Britain	20.47	
3rd place, bronze medalist(s)	Frank Emmelmann	East Germany	20.60	
4	Erwin Skamrahl	West Germany	20.60	
5	István Nagy	Hungary	20.62	
6	Patrick Barré	France	20.75	
7	Vladimir Muravyov	Soviet Union	20.76	
8	Sergey Sokolov	Soviet Union	20.81	
			Wind: -0.6 m/s	

== See also ==
- 1978 Men's European Championships 200 metres (Prague)
- 1980 Men's Olympic 200 metres (Moscow)
- 1983 Men's World Championships 200 metres (Helsinki)
- 1984 Men's Olympic 200 metres (Los Angeles)
- 1986 Men's European Championships 200 metres (Stuttgart)
- 1987 Men's World Championships 200 metres (Rome)
- 1988 Men's Olympic 200 metres (Seoul)
