= Athletics at the 1980 Summer Olympics – Men's 4 × 100 metres relay =

Men's 4 × 100 metres relay at the Games of the XXII Olympiad
- Venue: Grand Arena of the Central Lenin Stadium
- Dates: 31 July 1980 (round 1); 1 August 1980 (final)
- Competitors: 64 from 16 nations
- Winning time: 38.26

Medalists
1st place, gold medalist(s)		Vladimir Muravyov, Nikolai Sidorov, Aleksandr Aksinin, Andrey Prokofyev	Soviet Union
2nd place, silver medalist(s)		Krzysztof Zwoliński, Zenon Licznerski, Leszek Dunecki, Marian Woronin	Poland
3rd place, bronze medalist(s)		Antoine Richard, Pascal Barré, Patrick Barré, Hermann Panzo	France

These are the official results of the Men's 4 × 100 metre relay event at the 1980 Summer Olympics in Moscow, USSR. There were a total number of 16 nations competing. The top three in each heat and next two fastest advanced to the final.

== Final ==
The final was held on Friday 1 August 1980, at the Lenin Stadium

RANK	NATION	FINAL	TIME
	Soviet Union	• Vladimir Muravyov • Nikolai Sidorov • Aleksandr Aksinin • Andrey Prokofyev	38.26
	Poland	• Krzysztof Zwoliński • Zenon Licznerski • Leszek Dunecki • Marian Woronin	38.33
	France	• Antoine Richard • Pascal Barré • Patrick Barré • Hermann Panzo	38.53
4.	Great Britain	• Mike McFarlane • Allan Wells • Cameron Sharp • Drew McMaster	38.62
5.	East Germany	• Sören Schlegel • Eugen Ray • Bernhard Hoff • Thomas Munkelt	38.73
6.	Bulgaria	• Pavel Pavlov • Vladimir Ivanov • Ivaylo Karanyotov • Petar Petrov	38.99
7.	Nigeria	• Hammed Adio • Kayode Elegbede • Samson Oyeledun • Peter Okodogbe	39.12
8.	Brazil	• Milton de Castro • Nelson dos Santos • Katsuhiko Nakaya • Altevir de Araújo	39.54

== Heats ==
There were two heats which took place on 31 July 1980 at the Lenin Stadium. The first three in each heat and fastest two others advanced to the final.

RANK	NATION	HEAT 1	TIME
1.	Soviet Union	• Vladimir Muravyov • Nikolai Sidorov • Aleksandr Aksinin • Andrey Prokofyev	38.68
2.	France	• Antoine Richard • Pascal Barré • Patrick Barré • Hermann Panzo	39.01
3.	Bulgaria	• Pavel Pavlov • Vladimir Ivanov • Ivaylo Karanyotov • Petar Petrov	39.25
4.	Jamaica	• Don Quarrie • Colin Bradford • Michael Davis • Albert Lawrence	39.71
5.	Trinidad and Tobago	• Edwin Noel • Hasely Crawford • Christopher Brathwaite • Andrew Bruce	39.74
6.	Senegal	• Boubacar Diallo • Momar N'Dao • Cheikh Touradou Diouf • Issa Fall	40.25
7.	Seychelles	• Marc Larose • Régis Tranquille • Casimir Pereira • Vincent Confait	41.71
8.	Cuba	• Osvaldo Lara • Alejandro Casañas • Silvio Leonard • Tomás González	DNF

RANK	NATION	HEAT 2	TIME
1.	East Germany	• Sören Schlegel • Eugen Ray • Bernhard Hoff • Thomas Munkelt	38.65
2.	Poland	• Krzysztof Zwoliński • Zenon Licznerski • Leszek Dunecki • Marian Woronin	38.83
3.	Great Britain	• Mike McFarlane • Allan Wells • Cameron Sharp • Drew McMaster	39.20
4=.	Nigeria	• Hammed Adio • Kayode Elegbede • Samson Oyeledun • Peter Okodogbe	39.48
4=.	Brazil	• Milton de Castro • Nelson dos Santos • Katsuhiko Nakaya • Altevir de Araújo	39.48
6.	Hungary	• István Tatár • István Nagy • László Babály Sr. • Ferenc Kiss	39.97
7.	Republic of the Congo	• Louis Nkanza • Théophile Nkounkou • Jean-Pierre Bassegela • Antoine Kiakouama	40.09
8.	Sierra Leone	• Rudolph George • Sheku Boima • William Akabi-Davis • Walter During	42.53

== See also ==
- 1976 Men's Olympic Games 4 × 100 m Relay (Montreal)
- 1978 Men's European Championships 4 × 100 m Relay (Prague)
- 1982 Men's European Championships 4 × 100 m Relay (Athens)
- 1983 Men's World Championships 4 × 100 m Relay (Helsinki)
- 1984 Men's Olympic Games 4 × 100 m Relay (Los Angeles)
