= Athletics at the 1980 Summer Olympics – Men's 200 metres =

Men's 200 metres at the Games of the XXII Olympiad
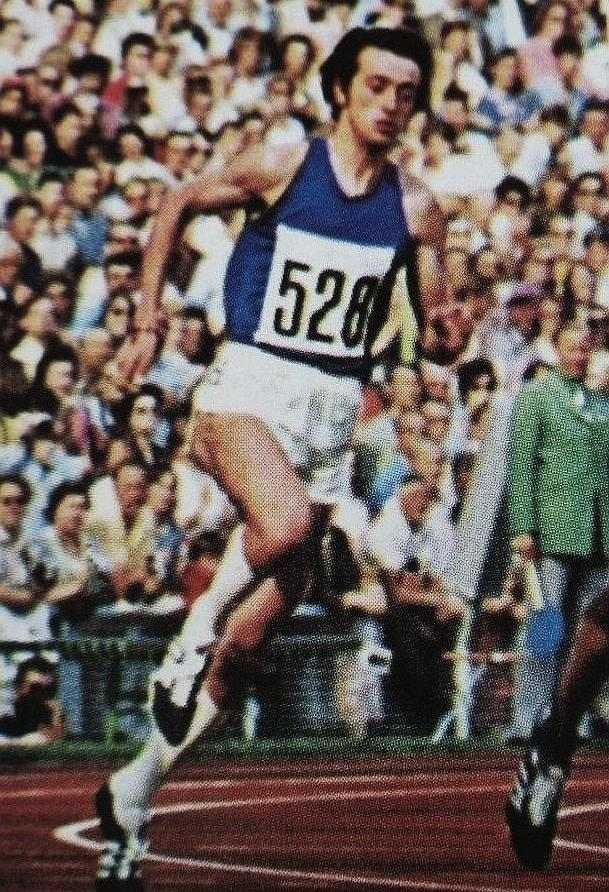
- Pietro Mennea (1973)
- Venue: Central Lenin Stadium
- Date: 27 July 1980 (heats and quarterfinals); 28 July 1980 (semifinals and final)
- Competitors: 57 from 37 nations
- Winning time: 20.19

Medalists
1st place, gold medalist(s)		Pietro Mennea; Italy
2nd place, silver medalist(s)		Allan Wells; Great Britain
3rd place, bronze medalist(s)		Don Quarrie; Jamaica

The men's 200 metres was an event at the 1980 Summer Olympics in Moscow. The competition was held on July 27, 1980, and on July 28, 1980. There were 57 competitors from 37 nations. The maximum number of athletes per nation had been set at three since the 1930 Olympic Congress. The event was won by 0.02 seconds by Pietro Mennea of Italy, the nation's first victory in the event since 1960 and second overall (tied for second-most with Canada behind the United States' 12 wins). This winning margin remains the narrowest in this event at the Olympics since the introduction of fully automatic timing. Great Britain earned its first medal in the men's 200 metres since 1928 with Allan Wells' silver. Don Quarrie of Jamaica, the defending champion, took bronze. Mennea (the 1972 bronze medalist) and Quarrie were the fifth and sixth men to earn multiple medals in the event.

== Summary ==
Random lane draw put the two semifinal winners on the outside, Leonard having the misfortune to draw lane 1, Mennea in lane 8. Wells was just inside of Mennea in 7 while Quarrie drew lane 4. Wells just eked into the final with a fourth place in his semifinal. Had timed qualification been involved, he only had the tenth-fastest time in the semis.

Wells, who disliked using starting blocks but used them, was out fast, making up the stagger on Mennea 40 metres into the race. Coming off the turn Mennea was two metres back, behind both Leonard and Quarrie. Mennea accelerated down the straight edging closer to Wells with every step. He caught Wells five metres before the finish and continued past him for the win, regarded as one of the great comebacks in Olympic sprinting. Quarrie was able to outlean Leonard for the bronze.

== Background ==
This was the 18th appearance of the event, which was not held at the first Olympics in 1896 but has been on the program ever since. Three of the eight finalists from the 1976 Games returned: gold medalist Don Quarrie of Jamaica, fourth-place finisher (and 1972 bronze medalist) Pietro Mennea of Italy, and seventh-place finisher Colin Bradford of Jamaica. The odds on favourite was Mennea, the current world record holder. Other favourites in the field included Quarrie, Silvio Leonard of Cuba, and Allan Wells of Great Britain.

Angola, Benin, Botswana, Guinea, Laos, Lebanon, Libya, Mozambique, the Seychelles, Sierra Leone, Syria, and Zambia each made their debut in the event. France and Great Britain each made their 16th appearance, most of the nations competing in 1980 but one fewer than the United States, missing the event for the first time.

== Competition format ==
The competition used the four round format introduced in 1920: heats, quarterfinals, semifinals, and a final. The "fastest loser" system introduced in 1960 was used in the heats.

There were 9 heats of between 6 and 7 runners each (before withdrawals), with the top 3 men in each advancing to the quarterfinals along with the next 5 fastest overall. The quarterfinals consisted of 4 heats of 8 athletes each; the 4 fastest men in each heat advanced to the semifinals. There were 2 semifinals, each with 8 runners. Again, the top 4 athletes advanced. The final had 8 runners. The races were run on a 400 metre track.

== Records ==
These were the standing world and Olympic records (in seconds) prior to the 1980 Summer Olympics.

World record	Pietro Mennea (ITA)	19.72	Mexico City, Mexico	12 September 1979
Olympic record	Tommie Smith (USA)	19.83	Mexico City, Mexico	16 October 1968

No new world or Olympic records were set during the competition.

== Schedule ==
All times are Moscow Time (UTC+3)

Date	Time	Round
Sunday, 27 July 1980	10:30; 18:25	Heats; Quarterfinals
Monday, 28 July 1980	17:20; 20:10	Semifinals; Final

== Results ==
=== Heats ===
Held on July 27, 1980.

==== Heat 1 ====
Rank	Athlete	Nation	Time	Notes
1	Cameron Sharp	Great Britain	21.51	Q
2	Tomás González	Cuba	21.64	Q
3	Pavel Pavlov	Bulgaria	21.78	Q
4	Nikolaos Angelopoulos	Greece	21.98	
5	Grégoire Illorson	Cameroon	22.21	
6	Rubén Inácio	Angola	22.52	
7	Casimir Pereira	Seychelles	22.59	

==== Heat 2 ====
Rank	Athlete	Nation	Time	Notes
1	Pietro Mennea	Italy	21.26	Q
2	Ferenc Kiss	Hungary	21.34	Q
3	Olaf Prenzler	East Germany	21.35	Q
4	Mike McFarlane	Great Britain	21.43	q
5	Nabil Nahri	Syria	22.14	
6	Ahmed Mohamed Sallouma	Libya	22.88	
—	Abdul Majeed Al-Mosawi	Kuwait	DNS	

==== Heat 3 ====
Rank	Athlete	Nation	Time	Notes
1	Don Quarrie	Jamaica	20.87	Q
2	Joseph Arame	France	21.24	Q
3	Peter Okodogbe	Nigeria	21.42	Q
4	Altevir de Araújo	Brazil	21.49	q
5	Cheikh Touradou Diouf	Senegal	21.89	
6	Henk Brouwer	Netherlands	21.96	
7	Paul Haba	Guinea	22.70	

==== Heat 4 ====
Rank	Athlete	Nation	Time	Notes
1	Marian Woronin	Poland	21.63	Q
2	István Nagy	Hungary	21.80	Q
3	Gerardo Suero	Dominican Republic	22.16	Q
—	Aleksandr Stasevich	Soviet Union	DNF	
—	Théophile Nkounkou	Republic of the Congo	DNS	
—	José Luis Elias	Peru	DNS	
—	Emmanuel Bitanga	Cameroon	DNS	

==== Heat 5 ====
Rank	Athlete	Nation	Time	Notes
1	Colin Bradford	Jamaica	21.17	Q
2	Leszek Dunecki	Poland	21.30	Q
3	Petar Petrov	Bulgaria	21.59	Q
4	David Lukuba	Tanzania	21.76	
5	Pascal Aho	Benin	22.09	
6	Roland Dagher	Lebanon	22.27	
7	Walter During	Sierra Leone	23.12	

==== Heat 6 ====
Rank	Athlete	Nation	Time	Notes
1	Andrew Bruce	Trinidad and Tobago	21.36	Q
2	Allan Wells	Great Britain	21.57	Q
3	Aleksandar Popović	Yugoslavia	21.65	Q
4	Hammed Adio	Nigeria	21.79	
5	Perumal Subramanian	India	22.39	
6	Rudolph George	Sierra Leone	23.20	
—	Vladimir Muravyov	Soviet Union	DNS	

==== Heat 7 ====
Rank	Athlete	Nation	Time	Notes
1	James Gilkes	Guyana	21.07	Q
2	František Břečka	Czechoslovakia	21.49	Q
3	Bernhard Hoff	East Germany	21.53	Q
4	Boubacar Diallo	Senegal	21.56	q
5	Joseph Letseka	Lesotho	22.31	
6	Lucien Josiah	Botswana	22.45	
—	Constantino Reis	Mozambique	DNF	

==== Heat 8 ====
Rank	Athlete	Nation	Time	Notes
1	Osvaldo Lara	Cuba	21.03	Q
2	Christopher Brathwaite	Trinidad and Tobago	21.13	Q
3	Nikolay Sidorov	Soviet Union	21.15	Q
4	Vladimir Ivanov	Bulgaria	21.28	q
5	Alston Muziyo	Zambia	22.47	
6	Besha Tuffa	Ethiopia	23.18	
—	Pascal Barré	France	DNS	

==== Heat 9 ====
Rank	Athlete	Nation	Time	Notes
1	Silvio Leonard	Cuba	20.95	Q
2	Bernard Petitbois	France	21.16	Q
3	Paulo Roberto Correia	Brazil	21.27	Q
4	Zenon Licznerski	Poland	21.36	q
5	Mwalimu Ally	Tanzania	21.83	
6	Sheku Boima	Sierra Leone	22.93	
7	Sitthixay Sacpraseuth	Laos	24.28	

=== Quarterfinals ===
Held on July 27, 1980.

==== Quarterfinal 1 ====
Rank	Athlete	Nation	Time	Notes
1	Don Quarrie	Jamaica	20.89	Q
2	Marian Woronin	Poland	20.97	Q
3	Osvaldo Lara	Cuba	21.01	Q
4	Ferenc Kiss	Hungary	21.24	Q
5	Bernard Petitbois	France	21.32	
6	Mike McFarlane	Great Britain	21.33	
7	Aleksandar Popović	Yugoslavia	21.66	
8	Petar Petrov	Bulgaria	21.89	

==== Quarterfinal 2 ====
Rank	Athlete	Nation	Time	Notes
1	Allan Wells	Great Britain	20.59	Q
2	James Gilkes	Guyana	20.83	Q
3	Peter Okodogbe	Nigeria	20.89	Q
4	Olaf Prenzler	East Germany	20.89	Q
5	Christopher Brathwaite	Trinidad and Tobago	21.02	
6	Colin Bradford	Jamaica	21.04	
7	Altevir de Araújo	Brazil	21.22	
8	Pavel Pavlov	Bulgaria	21.35	

==== Quarterfinal 3 ====
Rank	Athlete	Nation	Time	Notes
1	Silvio Leonard	Cuba	20.93	Q
2	Joseph Arame	France	20.95	Q
3	Bernhard Hoff	East Germany	20.96	Q
4	Cameron Sharp	Great Britain	21.16	Q
5	Zenon Licznerski	Poland	21.22	
6	István Nagy	Hungary	21.38	
7	František Břečka	Czechoslovakia	21.47	
8	Gerardo Suero	Dominican Republic	21.75	

==== Quarterfinal 4 ====
Rank	Athlete	Nation	Time	Notes
1	Pietro Mennea	Italy	20.60	Q
2	Nikolay Sidorov	Soviet Union	20.83	Q
3	Leszek Dunecki	Poland	20.87	Q
4	Andrew Bruce	Trinidad and Tobago	20.94	Q
5	Vladimir Ivanov	Bulgaria	20.96	
6	Paulo Roberto Correia	Brazil	21.01	
7	Boubacar Diallo	Senegal	21.10	
8	Tomás González	Cuba	21.19	

=== Semifinals ===
Held on July 28, 1980.

==== Semifinal 1 ====
Rank	Athlete	Nation	Time	Notes
1	Silvio Leonard	Cuba	20.61	Q
2	Bernhard Hoff	East Germany	20.69	Q
3	Marian Woronin	Poland	20.75	Q
4	Allan Wells	Great Britain	20.75	Q
5	James Gilkes	Guyana	20.87	
6	Peter Okodogbe	Nigeria	21.03	
7	Andrew Bruce	Trinidad and Tobago	21.16	
8	Ferenc Kiss	Hungary	21.17	

==== Semifinal 2 ====
Rank	Athlete	Nation	Time	Notes
1	Pietro Mennea	Italy	20.70	Q
2	Don Quarrie	Jamaica	20.76	Q
3	Leszek Dunecki	Poland	20.82	Q
4	Osvaldo Lara	Cuba	20.93	Q
5	Olaf Prenzler	East Germany	21.00	
6	Joseph Arame	France	21.05	
7	Nikolay Sidorov	Soviet Union	21.17	
8	Cameron Sharp	Great Britain	21.24	

=== Final ===
Held on July 28, 1980.

Rank	Athlete	Nation	Time
1st place, gold medalist(s)	Pietro Mennea	Italy	20.19
2nd place, silver medalist(s)	Allan Wells	Great Britain	20.21
3rd place, bronze medalist(s)	Don Quarrie	Jamaica	20.29
4	Silvio Leonard	Cuba	20.30
5	Bernhard Hoff	East Germany	20.50
6	Leszek Dunecki	Poland	20.68
7	Marian Woronin	Poland	20.81
8	Osvaldo Lara	Cuba	21.19

== See also ==
- 1978 Men's European Championships 200 metres (Prague)
- 1982 Men's European Championships 200 metres (Athens)
- 1983 Men's World Championships 200 metres (Helsinki)
