= Athletics at the 1977 Summer Universiade – Men's 4 × 100 metres relay =

Track and field event

The men's 4 × 100 metres relay event at the 1977 Summer Universiade was held at the Vasil Levski National Stadium in Sofia on 22 and 23 August.

== Results ==
=== Heats ===
Rank	Heat	Nation	Athletes	Time	Notes
1	1	Cuba	Silvio Leonard, Osvaldo Lara, Alejandro Casañas, Juan Saborit	39.97	Q
2	1	United States	William Snoddy, Mike Kee, Clancy Edwards, Harvey Glance	40.03	Q
3	1	Poland	Andrzej Świerczyński, Kazimierz Grubecki, Jan Alończyk, Leszek Dunecki	40.05	Q
4	1	Canada	Hugh Fraser, Cole Doty, Richard Rock, Dacre Bowen	40.69	q
5	1	Switzerland	Franco Fändrich, Urs Gisler, Peter Muster, Patrick Wamister	40.89	
1	2	Soviet Union	Nikolay Kolesnikov, Aleksandr Aksinin, Juris Silovs, Vladimir Ignatenko	39.76	Q
2	2	Italy	Stefano Curini, Stefano Rasori, Pietro Farina, Luciano Caravani	39.91	Q
3	2	West Germany	Bernward Plenker, Ulrich Haupt, Hans-Jürgen Berger, Dieter Gebhard	39.99	Q
4	2	France	Éric Bigon, Serge Dalbon, Philippe Pastre, Jean-Marc Lauzanas	40.45	q
5	2	Kuwait	Karam, Salem, Bello Akele Misban, Mohamed Kamal	45.18	
	2	Bulgaria	Stoyko Stoykov, Petar Petrov, Mirolyub Petkov, Lyubomir Zapryanov	40.61	

=== Final ===
Rank	Nation	Athletes	Time	Notes
1st place, gold medalist(s)	Soviet Union	Nikolay Kolesnikov, Aleksandr Aksinin, Juris Silovs, Vladimir Ignatenko	38.75	
2nd place, silver medalist(s)	Italy	Stefano Curini, Stefano Rasori, Pietro Farina, Luciano Caravani	39.15	
3rd place, bronze medalist(s)	United States	William Snoddy, Mike Kee, Clancy Edwards, Harvey Glance	39.17	
4	Cuba	Silvio Leonard, Osvaldo Lara, Alejandro Casañas, Juan Saborit	39.31	
5	Poland	Andrzej Świerczyński, Kazimierz Grubecki, Jan Alończyk, Leszek Dunecki	39.41	
6	West Germany	Bernward Plenker, Ulrich Haupt, Hans-Jürgen Berger, Dieter Gebhard	39.67	
7	France	Éric Bigon, Serge Dalbon, Philippe Pastre, Jean-Marc Lauzanas	39.94	
	Canada		DNS	
