= Athletics at the 1980 Summer Olympics – Men's 100 metres =

Men's 100 metres at the Games of the XXII Olympiad
- Athletics
- Venue: Lenin Olympic Stadium
- Date: July 24, 1980 (heats); July 25, 1980 (finals)
- Competitors: 65 from 40 nations
- Winning time: 10.25

Medalists
1st place, gold medalist(s)		Allan Wells; Great Britain
2nd place, silver medalist(s)		Silvio Leonard; Cuba
3rd place, bronze medalist(s)		Petar Petrov; Bulgaria

Official Video Highlights

The men's 100 metres event was one of the events in the 1980 Summer Olympics in Moscow. The competition was held on July 24, 1980, and on July 25, 1980. Sixty-five athletes from 40 nations competed. Each nation was limited to 3 athletes per rules in force since the 1930 Olympic Congress. The event was won by Allan Wells of Great Britain, that nation's first title in the men's 100 metres since 1924. Cuba took its first medal in the event since 1964, with Silvio Leonard's silver matching the nation's best result. Petar Petrov's bronze was Bulgaria's first Olympic medal in the men's 100 metres.

Allan Wells and Silvio Leonard both clocked the same time in the final (10.25 seconds) which was the first time this had happened in the men's Olympic 100 metres final since the introduction of fully automatic timing.

== Background ==
This was the nineteenth time the event was held, having appeared at every Olympics since the first in 1896. Four finalists from 1976 returned: defending gold medal winner Hasely Crawford of Trinidad and Tobago, silver medalist Don Quarrie of Jamaica, seventh-place finisher Klaus-Dieter Kurrat of East Germany, and eighth-place finisher Petar Petrov of Bulgaria, while the American team, including 1977 IAAF World Cup winner and world record holder Steve Williams, were absent as they boycotted the Games. Other notable entrants included Silvio Leonard of Cuba (1975 and 1979 Pan-American Games champion, 1976 Olympic quarterfinalist, 1977 World Cup bronze medal), Eugen Ray of East Germany (1977 World Cup silver medalist), and Allan Wells of Great Britain (second to Quarrie at the 1978 Commonwealth Games).

Eleven nations appeared in the event for the first time: Angola, Benin, Botswana, Guinea, Laos, Lebanon, Mozambique, Nepal, Seychelles, Sierra Leone, and Syria, while the United States missed this event for the first (and so far only) time in Olympic history. France and Great Britain made their 16th appearances in the event, tied with Canada (also absent due to the boycott) for second-most, after the United States, with 18.

== Competition format ==
The event retained the same basic four-round format introduced in 1920: heats, quarterfinals, semifinals, and a final. The "fastest loser" system, introduced in 1968, was used again to ensure that the quarterfinals and subsequent rounds had exactly 8 runners per heat; this time, that system applied only in the preliminary heats. With only two more runners than in 1976, the format was held very static, including the number of heats.

The first round consisted of nine heats, each with six to eight athletes. The top three runners in each heat advanced, along with the next five fastest runners overall. This made 32 quarterfinalists, who were divided into four heats of eight runners. The top four runners in each quarterfinal advanced, with no "fastest loser" places. The sixteen semifinalists competed in two heats of eight, with the top four in each semifinal advancing to the eight-man final.

== Records ==
These are the standing world and Olympic records (in seconds) prior to the 1980 Summer Olympics.

World record	9.95	(United States) Jim Hines	Mexico City (MEX)	October 14, 1968
Olympic record	9.95	(United States) Jim Hines	Mexico City (MEX)	October 14, 1968

== Results ==
=== Heats ===
- Held on July 24, 1980

==== Heat 1 ====
Rank	Athlete	Nation	Time	Notes
1	Silvio Leonard	Cuba	10.33	Q
2	Peter Okodogbe	Nigeria	10.39	Q
3	Christopher Brathwaite	Trinidad and Tobago	10.44	Q
4	Klaus-Dieter Kurrat	East Germany	10.53	q
5	Charles Kachenjela	Zambia	11.03	
6	John Carew	Sierra Leone	11.11	
7	Marc Larose	Seychelles	11.27	

==== Heat 2 ====
Rank	Athlete	Nation	Time	Notes
1	Pietro Mennea	Italy	10.56	Q
2	Lambros Kefalas	Greece	10.70	Q
3	Katsuhiko Nakaya	Brazil	10.72	Q
4	Momar N'Dao	Senegal	10.73	
5	Eduardo Costa	Mozambique	11.02	
6	Lucien Josiah	Botswana	11.15	
7	Soutsakhone Somninhom	Laos	11.69	

==== Heat 3 ====
Rank	Athlete	Nation	Time	Notes
1	Aleksandr Aksinin	Soviet Union	10.26	Q
2	Leszek Dunecki	Poland	10.42	Q
3	Nelson dos Santos	Brazil	10.51	Q
4	Hammed Adio	Nigeria	10.58	q
5	Nabil Nahri	Syria	10.67	
6	Mwalimu Ally	Tanzania	10.86	
7	Rudolph George	Sierra Leone	11.37	

==== Heat 4 ====
Rank	Athlete	Nation	Time	Notes
1	Petar Petrov	Bulgaria	10.32	Q
2	Vladimir Muravyov	Soviet Union	10.37	Q
3	Osvaldo Lara	Cuba	10.39	Q
4	Antoine Richard	France	10.51	q
5	Pascal Aho	Benin	11.01	
6	Joseph Letseka	Lesotho	11.21	
7	Ilídio Coelho	Angola	11.42	
8	Besha Tuffa	Ethiopia	11.55	

==== Heat 5 ====
Rank	Athlete	Nation	Time	Notes
1	Eugen Ray	East Germany	10.38	Q
2	Hasely Crawford	Trinidad and Tobago	10.42	Q
3	Drew McMaster	Great Britain	10.43	Q
4	Gerardo Suero	Dominican Republic	10.53	q
5	Roland Dagher	Lebanon	11.01	
6	Sheku Boima	Sierra Leone	11.08	
7	Raghu Raj Onta	Nepal	11.61	

==== Heat 6 ====
Rank	Athlete	Nation	Time	Notes
1	Sören Schlegel	East Germany	10.44	Q
2	Hermann Panzo	France	10.53	Q
3	Tomás González	Cuba	10.65	Q
4	Antoine Kiakouama	Republic of the Congo	10.69	
5	Milton de Castro	Brazil	10.74	
6	Boubacar Diallo	Senegal	10.75	
7	Adille Sumariwalla	India	11.04	

==== Heat 7 ====
Rank	Athlete	Nation	Time	Notes
1	Allan Wells	Great Britain	10.35	Q
2	Don Quarrie	Jamaica	10.37	Q
3	Krzysztof Zwoliński	Poland	10.60	Q
4	Ivaylo Karanyotov	Bulgaria	10.66	
5	István Tatár	Hungary	10.69	
6	Mario Westbroek	Netherlands	10.91	
7	Oddur Sigurðsson	Iceland	10.94	

==== Heat 8 ====
Rank	Athlete	Nation	Time	Notes
1	James Gilkes	Guyana	10.34	Q
2	Cameron Sharp	Great Britain	10.38	Q
3	Théophile Nkounkou	Republic of the Congo	10.53	Q
4	István Nagy	Hungary	10.68	
5	David Lukuba	Tanzania	10.74	
6	Paul Haba	Guinea	11.19	
7	Abdul Majeed Al-Mosawi	Kuwait	11.28	

==== Heat 9 ====
Rank	Athlete	Nation	Time	Notes
1	Grégoire Illorson	Cameroon	10.34	Q
2	Marian Woronin	Poland	10.35	Q
3	Andrey Shlyapnikov	Soviet Union	10.43	Q
4	Samson Oyeledun	Nigeria	10.59	q
5	Francis Adams	Trinidad and Tobago	10.80	
6	Peter Mwita	Tanzania	11.07	
7	Salif Koné	Mali	11.07	
8	José Luis Elias	Peru	13.66	

=== Quarterfinals ===
- Held on July 24, 1980

==== Quarterfinal 1 ====
Rank	Athlete	Nation	Time	Notes
1	Allan Wells	Great Britain	10.11	Q
2	Petar Petrov	Bulgaria	10.13	Q
3	Osvaldo Lara	Cuba	10.21	Q
4	Pietro Mennea	Italy	10.27	Q
5	Hasely Crawford	Trinidad and Tobago	10.28	
6	Sören Schlegel	East Germany	10.28	
7	Nelson dos Santos	Brazil	10.45	
8	Lambros Kefalas	Greece	10.62	

==== Quarterfinal 2 ====
Rank	Athlete	Nation	Time	Notes
1	Aleksandr Aksinin	Soviet Union	10.29	Q
2	Don Quarrie	Jamaica	10.29	Q
3	Hermann Panzo	France	10.29	Q
4	Peter Okodogbe	Nigeria	10.34	Q
5	Leszek Dunecki	Poland	10.40	
6	Drew McMaster	Great Britain	10.42	
7	Tomás González	Cuba	10.44	
8	Gerardo Suero	Dominican Republic	10.57	

==== Quarterfinal 3 ====
Rank	Athlete	Nation	Time	Notes
1	Silvio Leonard	Cuba	10.16	Q
2	Marian Woronin	Poland	10.27	Q
3	Eugen Ray	East Germany	10.30	Q
4	Christopher Brathwaite	Trinidad and Tobago	10.37	Q
5	Andrei Shlyapnikov	Soviet Union	10.41	
6	Théophile Nkounkou	Republic of the Congo	10.59	
7	Hammed Adio	Nigeria	10.67	
8	Katsuhiko Nakaya	Brazil	10.70	

==== Quarterfinal 4 ====
Rank	Athlete	Nation	Time	Notes
1	James Gilkes	Guyana	10.26	Q
2	Grégoire Illorson	Cameroon	10.29	Q
3	Vladimir Muravyov	Soviet Union	10.34	Q
4	Cameron Sharp	Great Britain	10.38	Q
5	Antoine Richard	France	10.45	
6	Klaus-Dieter Kurrat	East Germany	10.54	
7	Krzysztof Zwoliński	Poland	10.54	
8	Samson Oyeledun	Nigeria	10.73	

=== Semifinals ===
- Held on July 25, 1980

==== Semifinal 1 ====
Rank	Athlete	Nation	Time	Notes
1	Petar Petrov	Bulgaria	10.39	Q
2	Silvio Leonard	Cuba	10.40	Q
3	Aleksandr Aksinin	Soviet Union	10.45	Q
4	Hermann Panzo	France	10.45	Q
5	Don Quarrie	Jamaica	10.55	
6	Pietro Mennea	Italy	10.58	
7	Cameron Sharp	Great Britain	10.60	
8	Grégoire Illorson	Cameroon	10.60	

==== Semifinal 2 ====
Rank	Athlete	Nation	Time	Notes
1	Allan Wells	Great Britain	10.27	Q
2	Osvaldo Lara	Cuba	10.34	Q
3	Vladimir Muravyov	Soviet Union	10.42	Q
4	Marian Woronin	Poland	10.43	Q
5	James Gilkes	Guyana	10.44	
6	Eugen Ray	East Germany	10.47	
7	Peter Okodogbe	Nigeria	10.51	
8	Christopher Brathwaite	Trinidad and Tobago	10.54	

=== Final ===
- Held on July 25, 1980

Rank	Athlete	Nation	Time
1st place, gold medalist(s)	Allan Wells	Great Britain	10.25
2nd place, silver medalist(s)	Silvio Leonard	Cuba	10.25
3rd place, bronze medalist(s)	Petar Petrov	Bulgaria	10.39
4	Aleksandr Aksinin	Soviet Union	10.42
5	Osvaldo Lara	Cuba	10.43
6	Vladimir Muravyov	Soviet Union	10.44
7	Marian Woronin	Poland	10.46
8	Hermann Panzo	France	10.49

== See also ==
- 100 metres at the Olympics
- 1976 Men's Olympic 100 metres (Montreal)
- 1978 Men's European Championships 100 metres (Prague)
- 1982 Men's European Championships 100 metres (Athens)
- 1983 Men's World Championships 100 metres (Helsinki)
- 1984 Men's Olympic 100 metres (Los Angeles)
