= Athletics at the 1977 Summer Universiade – Men's 200 metres =

The men's 200 metres event at the 1977 Summer Universiade was held at the Vasil Levski National Stadium in Sofia on 21 and 22 August.

== Medalists ==
Gold	Silver	Bronze
Clancy Edwards; United States	Silvio Leonard; Cuba	William Snoddy; United States

== Results ==
=== Heats ===
Held on 21 August

Wind:
Heat 1: +1.8 m/s, Heat 5: +1.2 m/s, Heat 6: +0.2 m/s, Heat 7: +0.8 m/s

Rank	Heat	Athlete	Nationality	Time	Notes
1	1	William Snoddy	United States	20.75	Q
2	5	Silvio Leonard	Cuba	20.76	Q
3	8	Peter Muster	Switzerland	20.98	Q
4	5	Urs Gisler	Switzerland	21.00	Q
5	6	Osvaldo Lara	Cuba	21.06	Q
6	6	Pietro Farina	Italy	21.07	Q
7	1	Roland Bombardella	Luxembourg	21.09	Q
8	8	Reno Roelandt	Belgium	21.12	Q
9	6	Vilmundur Vilhjálmsson	Iceland	21.23	q
10	4	Yasuhiro Harada	Japan	21.32	Q
11	2	Petar Petrov	Bulgaria	21.33	Q
12	1	Thomas Schultheiss	West Germany	21.35	q
12	6	Andrzej Świerczyński	Poland	21.35	q
14	5	Kazimierz Grubecki	Poland	21.36	q
15	5	Alan Bell	Great Britain	21.36	q
16	6	Didier Brel	France	21.47	q
17	8	Stefano Curini	Italy	21.51	q
18	2	Brahim Badi	Algeria	21.53	Q
19	4	Jeffrey Matahelemual	Indonesia	21.64	Q
20	3	Peter Matejka	Austria	21.66	Q
21	2	Endre Lépold	Hungary	21.74	q
22	8	Miguel Ángel Arnau	Spain	21.78	
23	3	Jesús Cabrera	Puerto Rico	21.80	
24	8	Maki Fadl Turki El Moula	Sudan	21.88	
25	4	Henri Hermans	Belgium	21.89	
26	2	Alex Fortelny	Austria	21.93	
27	3	Mirolyub Petkov	Bulgaria	21.99	
28	1	Güner Güngör	Turkey	22.05	
29	7	Bernward Plenker	West Germany	22.10	Q
30	7	Eric Bigon	France	22.11	Q
31	1	Omar Youssif Najib	Sudan	22.14	
32	2	Nabil Nahri	Syria	22.48	
33	8	Selim Ergun	Turkey	22.73	
34	3	Ch. Arqbet	Tunisia	23.28	
35	5	Mohamed Khlill	Jordan	24.74	

=== Semifinals ===
Held on 22 August

Wind:
Heat 1: -2.2 m/s, Heat 2: ? m/s, Heat 3: ? m/s

Rank	Heat	Athlete	Nationality	Time	Notes
1	2	Silvio Leonard	Cuba	20.94	Q
2	3	Clancy Edwards	United States	20.95	Q
3	2	Roland Bombardella	Luxembourg	21.23	Q
4	2	Urs Gisler	Switzerland	21.26	q
4	3	Reno Roelandt	Belgium	21.26	Q
4	3	Peter Muster	Switzerland	21.26	q
7	1	William Snoddy	United States	21.40	Q
8	2	Andrzej Świerczyński	Poland	21.45	
9	1	Petar Petrov	Bulgaria	21.50	Q
10	1	Osvaldo Lara	Cuba	21.59	
11	3	Vilmundur Vilhjálmsson	Iceland	21.60	
12	2	Yasuhiro Harada	Japan	21.66	
13	2	Stefano Curini	Italy	21.68	
14	1	Pietro Farina	Italy	21.71	
15	3	Kazimierz Grubecki	Poland	21.72	
16	2	Bernward Plenker	West Germany	21.78	
16	3	Peter Matejka	Austria	21.78	
18	3	Alan Bell	Great Britain	21.93	
19	1	Thomas Schultheiss	West Germany	21.97	
20	1	Jeffrey Matahelemual	Indonesia	22.00	
21	1	Éric Bigon	France	22.03	
22	1	Brahim Badi	Algeria	22.12	
23	3	Endre Lépold	Hungary	22.23	
24	2	Didier Brel	France	22.47	

=== Final ===
Held on 22 August

Wind: -1.8 m/s

Rank	Athlete	Nationality	Time	Notes
1st place, gold medalist(s)	Clancy Edwards	United States	20.46	
2nd place, silver medalist(s)	Silvio Leonard	Cuba	20.64	
3rd place, bronze medalist(s)	William Snoddy	United States	21.17	
4	Roland Bombardella	Luxembourg	21.20	
5	Reno Roelandt	Belgium	21.25	
6	Peter Muster	Switzerland	21.41	
7	Petar Petrov	Bulgaria	21.41	
8	Urs Gisler	Switzerland	21.44	
