= Öberg =

Öberg is a Swedish surname. Notable people with the surname include:

- Andreas Öberg, (born 1978), Swedish guitar musician
- Brita Öberg (1900–1969), Swedish actress
- Carl-Göran Öberg (born 1938), Swedish ice hockey player
- Charlotta Öberg (1818–1856), Swedish poet
- Elvira Öberg (born 1999), Swedish biathlete
- Hanna Öberg (born 1995), Swedish biathlete
- Karin Öberg (born 1982), Swedish astrochemist
- Maria Öberg (born 1966), Swedish politician
- Per Öberg (born 1962), Swedish handball player
- Peter Öberg (ice hockey) (born 1982), Swedish ice hockey player
- Peter Öberg (orienteer) (born 1980), Swedish orienteering competitor
- Prawitz Öberg (1930–1995), Swedish footballer
- Rune Öberg (1922–2002), Swedish water polo player
- Sigfrid Öberg (1907–1949), Swedish ice hockey player
- Thomas Öberg (singer) (born 1967), Swedish musician

== See also ==
- Oberg
