= Kayode Elegbede =

Nigerian athlete

Personal information
- Born: 9 September 1955 (age 70)

Sport
- Sport: Track and field
Medal record
Representing Nigeria
African Championships
Silver medal – second place	1979 Dakar	Long jump

Olukayode "Kayode" Elegbede (born 9 September 1955) is a retired Nigerian sprinter and long jumper.

He won the silver medal at the first African Championships in 1979, with 7.89—five centimetres behind compatriot Ajayi Agbebaku. He finished eleventh at the 1980 Olympic Games. Here he also finished seventh in the 4 × 100 metres relay, together with Hammed Adio, Olajidie Oyeledun and Peter Okodogbe.

His personal bests were 8.02 metres in the long jump (1982) and 10.6 seconds in the 100 metres (1980).
