= 1982 European Athletics Championships – Men's 4 × 100 metres relay =

Men's 4 × 100 metres relay at the European Athletics Championships

These are the official results of the Men's 4 × 100 metres event at the 1982 European Championships in Athens, Greece. The final was held at Olympic Stadium "Spiros Louis" on 11 September 1982.

== Medalists ==
Gold	Sergey Sokolov; Aleksandr Aksinin; Andrey Prokofyev; Nikolay Sidorov; Soviet Union
Silver	Detlef Kübeck; Olaf Prenzler; Thomas Munkelt; Frank Emmelmann; East Germany
Bronze	Christian Zirkelbach; Christian Haas; Peter Klein; Erwin Skamrahl; West Germany

== Final ==
Rank	Nation	Athletes	Time
	Soviet Union (URS)	• Andrey Prokofyev • Sergey Sokolov • Aleksandr Aksinin • Nikolay Sidorov	38.60
	East Germany (GDR)	• Thomas Munkelt • Detlef Kübeck • Olaf Prenzler • Frank Emmelmann	38.71
	West Germany (FRG)	• Christian Zirkelbach • Christian Haas • Peter Klein • Erwin Skamrahl	38.71
4.	Italy (ITA)	• Pierfrancesco Pavoni • Giovanni Bongiorni • Luciano Caravani • Carlo Simionato	38.96
5.	Poland (POL)	• Arkadiusz Janiak • Zenon Licznerski • Krzysztof Zwoliński • Marian Woronin	39.00
6.	Hungary (HUN)	• István Tatár • István Nagy • László Babály • Attila Kovács	39.01
7.	France (FRA)	• Antoine Richard • Patrick Barré • Bernard Petitbois • Hermann Lomba	39.22
8.	Bulgaria (BUL)	• Ivaylo Karanyotov • Nikolay Markov • Petar Petrov • Ivan Tuparov	39.39

== Participation ==
According to an unofficial count, 32 athletes from 8 countries participated in the event.

- Bulgaria (4)
- East Germany (4)
- France (4)
- Hungary (4)
- Italy (4)
- Poland (4)
- Soviet Union (4)
- West Germany (4)

== See also ==
- 1978 Men's European Championships 4 × 100 m Relay (Prague)
- 1980 Men's Olympic 4 × 100 m Relay (Moscow)
- 1983 Men's World Championships 4 × 100 m Relay (Helsinki)
- 1984 Men's Olympic 4 × 100 m Relay (Los Angeles)
- 1986 Men's European Championships 4 × 100 m Relay (Stuttgart)
- 1987 Men's World Championships 4 × 100 m Relay (Rome)
- 1988 Men's Olympic 4 × 100 m Relay (Seoul)
- 1990 Men's European Championships 4 × 100 m Relay (Split)
