= Olaf Prenzler =

East German sprinter (born 1958)

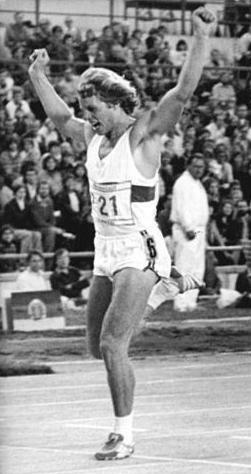
- Prenzler in 1978

Medal record

Men's athletics

Representing East Germany

European Championships
Gold medal – first place	1982 Athens	200 m
Silver medal – second place	1978 Prague	200 m
Silver medal – second place	1978 Prague	4×100 m
Silver medal – second place	1982 Athens	4×100 m

Olaf Prenzler (born 2 April 1958) is an East German former sprinter who specialised in the 100 and 200 metres.

== Career ==
Prenzler was born in 1958 in Kästorf near Gifhorn in Lower Saxony, Germany. He was a European Junior silver medallist in the 100 metres in 1977. In 1979 he was the East German 100 metres champion; he also won the national 200 metres in 1978, and 1983.

Prenzler was the East German indoor 200 metres champion on three occasions.

At the 1978 European Championships he won silver medals in the 200 metres and in the 4 × 100 metres relay, the latter with teammates Manfred Kokot, Eugen Ray and Alexander Thieme.

He participated in the 1980 Summer Olympics, in the 200 metres but was eliminated in the semi-finals.

At the 1982 European Championships he won the Gold in the 200 metres. In the 4 × 100 metres relay he won a silver medal with teammates Thomas Munkelt, Detlef Kübeck and Frank Emmelmann.

He won a silver medal in 200 m at the 1985 European Indoor Championships.

At the 1986 European Championships he finished sixth in 100 m and seventh in 200 m. He then won another silver medal in the 4 × 100 metres relay with teammates Thomas Schröder, Steffen Bringmann and Frank Emmelmann.

He represented the sports team SC Magdeburg and became East German champion in 1978 (200 m), 1979 (100 m) and 1983 (200 m). In July 1982 he helped established an East German relay record with 38.28 seconds.
