= 2004 Lithuanian Athletics Championships =

- Edition: 81st
- Dates: 24–25 July
- Host city: Kaunas, Lithuania
- Level: Senior
- Type: Outdoor

The 81st 2004 Lithuanian Athletics Championships were held in S. Darius and S. Girėnas Stadium, Kaunas on 24–25 July 2004.

== Men ==
Event	Gold		Silver		Bronze	
100 m	Andrius Kačėnas	10.60	Dainius Šerpytis	10.78	Deividas Šeferis	10.88
200 m	Raimondas Turla	21.74	Deividas Šeferis	21.80	Dainius Šerpytis	21.87
400 m	Raimondas Turla	47.06	Mindaugas Butkus	47.85	Vitalij Gorbunov	48.64
800 m	Evaldas Martinka	1:51.92	Vitalij Gorbunov	1:52.37	Valerij Petrulevič	1:52.46
1500 m	Karolis Levickis	3:55.78	Vygantas Juškevičius	3:56.35	Tomas Lemežis	3:57.07
5000 m	Marius Diliūnas	15:01.27	Tomas Stasionis	15:03.41	Gediminas Jacikevičius	15:06.55
10000 m	Tomas Venckūnas	31:31.03	Kęstutis Bartkėnas	32:28.34	Antanas Žukauskas	33:21.67
110 m hurdles	Vytautas Kancleris	14.46	Rolandas Stanionis	14.68	Andrius Kašinskas	15.06
400 m hurdles	Artūras Kulnis	54.37	Vilius Šnipaitis	55.75	Donatas Verkys	56.54
3000 m st.	Karolis Levickis	9:07.56	Mindaugas Tomanas	9:18.79	Justinas Križinauskas	9:45.62
20 km walk	Daugvinas Zujus	1:25:10	Marius Žiūkas	1:27:17	Vilius Mikelionis	1:28:09
High jump	Modestas Žukauskas	2.11	Nerijus Bužas	2.08	Žilvinas Antanavičius	2.08
Pole vault	Vytautas Žukaitis	4.30	Jonas Spudis	4.20	Audrius Baltrušaitis	4.00
Long jump	Arvydas Nazarovas	7.86	Vytautas Seliukas	7.60	Sigitas Kavaliauskas	7.59
Triple jump	Andrius Gricevičius	16.04	Arvydas Nazarovas	16.00	Audrius Raizgys	15.55
Shot put	Tomas Keinys	17.82	Gintas Degutis	16.10	Aleksas Abromavičius	15.90
Discus throw	Virgilijus Alekna	69.25	Andrius Butrimas	52.00	Andrius Šipalis	48.50
Javelin throw	Tomas Intas	75.86	Aleksandr Kozlov	69.08	Mindaugas Kurčenkovas	68.04
Hammer throw	Žydrūnas Vasiliauskas	63.23	Tomas Tarvydas	51.87	Andrius Stankevičius	51.78
4 × 100 m	Kaunas	41.59				
4 × 400 m	Vilnius	3:20.01	RR-1	3:23.00	Klaipėda	3:24.49

== Women ==
Event	Gold		Silver		Bronze	
100 m	Agnė Eggerth	11.41	Lina Grinčikaitė	11.75	Edita Lingytė	11.87
200 m	Agnė Eggerth	23.39	Edita Lingytė	24.04	Ernesta Karaškienė	24.27
400 m	Jūratė Kudirkaitė	54.59	Kristina Majauskaitė	55.72	Alina Varpiotaitė	55.90
800 m	Irina Krakoviak	2:04.33	Alina Valatkevičiūtė	2:10.68	Alina Varpiotaitė	2:11.15
1500 m	Irina Krakoviak	4:16.99	Alina Valatkevičiūtė	4:32.00	Olga Kondratjeva	4:32.45
5000 m	Gytė Norgilienė	17:24.55	Aurelija Ručinskaitė	19:21.16	Julija Smirnova	19:40.42
10000 m	Živilė Balčiūnaitė	32:47.47	Eglė Krištaponytė	38:21.33	Andželika Liauškaitė	42:29.18
100 m hurdles	Ernesta Karaškienė	14.01	Austra Skujytė	14.14	Enrika Baliutavičiūtė	15.02
400 m hurdles	Vlada Musvydaitė	1:02.25	Ema Šilauskaitė	1:03.97	Miglė Meškauskaitė	1:04.93
2000 m st.	Odeta Šidlauskaitė	7:09.91	Aurelija Ručinskaitė	7:34.88	Valerija Lišakova	7:51.99
20 km walk	Laura Sukockytė	1:44:30	Lina Šidiškytė	1:48:54	Gerda Juozaitytė	1:55:33
High jump	Viktorija Žemaitytė	1.74	Deimantė Meiliūnaitė	1.71	Indrė Sabaliauskaitė	1.71
Pole vault	Edita Grigelionytė	3.50	Rolanda Demčenko	3.40	Rita Sadzevičienė	3.40
Long jump	Adrija Paršukova	6.50	Živilė Šikšnelytė	6.10	Dovilė Tanskytė	6.01
Triple jump	Virginija Petkevičienė	13.37	Indrė Sabaliauskaitė	12.51	Raimonda Rimkutė	12.46
Shot put	Austra Skujytė	16.70	Alina Vaišvilaitė	14.61	Rasa Austytė	14.50
Discus throw	Austra Mikelytė	53.45	Zinaida Sendriūtė	51.38	Raminta Sakalauskaitė	47.50
Javelin throw	Rita Ramanauskaitė	62.45	Indrė Jakubaitytė	58.20	Inga Stasiulionytė	50.12
Hammer throw	Lina Kraskauskaitė	49.62	Rasa Austytė	46.28	Kristina Kozlovienė	45.13
4 × 100 m	Nacionalinė team	45.73	Vilnius	48.96		
4 × 400 m	Kaunas	3:48.54	Vilnius	3:52.45	Šiauliai	4:09.00
