= Zirkelbach =

Zirkelbach is a surname. Notable people with the surname include:

- Christian Zirkelbach (born 1961), West German sprinter
- Ray Zirkelbach (born 1978), American politician, prison counselor, and soldier
