= 1978 European Athletics Championships – Men's 200 metres =

Men's 200 metres at the 1978 European Athletics Championships
- Venue: Stadion Evžena Rošického
- Location: Prague
- Dates: 31 August (heats & semi-finals); 1 September (final)
- Competitors: 26 from 15 nations
- Winning time: 20.16

Medalists
gold medal	Pietro Mennea	Italy
silver medal	Olaf Prenzler	Switzerland
bronze medal	Peter Muster	East Germany

The men's 200 metres at the 1978 European Athletics Championships was held in Prague, then Czechoslovakia, at Stadion Evžena Rošického on 31 August, and 1 September 1978.

The winning margin was 0.45 seconds. With the conclusion of the 2024 championships, this remains the greatest winning margin in the men's 200 metres at these championships, a feat which was equalled in 2012 by Churandy Martina of the Netherlands.

== Participation ==
According to an unofficial count, 26 athletes from 15 countries participated in the event.

- Belgium (2)
- Bulgaria (2)
- Czechoslovakia (3)
- East Germany (2)
- Finland (1)
- France (3)
- Great Britain (2)
- Iceland (1)
- Italy (1)
- Luxembourg (2)
- Poland (2)
- Soviet Union (2)
- Spain (1)
- Switzerland (1)
- Yugoslavia (1)

== Results ==
=== Heats ===
31 August

==== Heat 1 ====
Rank	Name	Nationality	Time	Notes
1	Pietro Mennea	Italy	20.70	Q
2	Leszek Dunecki	Poland	21.01	Q
3	Dragan Zarić	Yugoslavia	21.13	Q
4	David Jenkins	Great Britain	21.16	Q
5	Roland Bombardella	Luxembourg	21.17	
6	Lambert Micha	Belgium	21.36	
			Wind: +0.5 m/s	

==== Heat 2 ====
Rank	Name	Nationality	Time	Notes
1	Aleksandr Aksinin	Soviet Union	20.97	Q
2	Joseph Arame	France	21.32	Q
3	Antti Rajamäki	Finland	21.34	Q
4	Klaus Thiele	East Germany	21.36	Q
5	Luděk Bohman	Czechoslovakia	21.39	
6	Mike Bayle	Luxembourg	21.48	
7	Vilmundur Vilhjálmsson	Iceland	21.80	
			Wind: -1.5 m/s	

==== Heat 3 ====
Rank	Name	Nationality	Time	Notes
1	Pascal Barré	France	20.78	Q
2	Vladimir Ignatenko	Soviet Union	20.98	Q
3	Luis Sarría	Spain	21.18	Q
4	Martin Pelach	Czechoslovakia	21.48	Q
5	Pavel Pavlov	Bulgaria	21.50	
	Renno Roelandt	Belgium	DNF	
			Wind: -0.2 m/s	

==== Heat 4 ====
Rank	Name	Nationality	Time	Notes
1	Zenon Licznerski	Poland	20.82	Q
2	Vladimir Ivanov	Bulgaria	20.96	Q
3	Olaf Prenzler	East Germany	20.97	Q
4	Peter Muster	Switzerland	21.04	Q
5	Trevor Hoyte	Great Britain	21.24	
6	Patrick Barré	France	21.27	
7	Marián Králik	Czechoslovakia	21.47	
			Wind: +0.2 m/s	

=== Semi-finals ===
31 August

==== Heat 1 ====
Rank	Name	Nationality	Time	Notes
1	Pietro Mennea	Italy	20.40	Q
2	Peter Muster	Switzerland	20.63	Q
3	Leszek Dunecki	Poland	20.64	Q
4	Olaf Prenzler	East Germany	20.69	Q
5	Vladimir Ignatenko	Soviet Union	20.74	
6	Joseph Arame	France	21.08	
7	Antti Rajamäki	Finland	21.19	
8	Martin Pelach	Czechoslovakia	21.59	
			Wind: -0.2 m/s	

==== Heat 2 ====
Rank	Name	Nationality	Time	Notes
1	Pascal Barré	France	20.96	Q
2	Vladimir Ivanov	Bulgaria	20.96	Q
3	Aleksandr Aksinin	Soviet Union	21.08	Q
4	Zenon Licznerski	Poland	21.10	Q
5	Luis Sarría	Spain	21.24	
6	Dragan Zarić	Yugoslavia	21.28	
7	David Jenkins	Great Britain	21.59	
	Klaus Thiele	East Germany	DNF	
			Wind: 0.0 m/s	

=== Final ===
1 September

Rank	Name	Nationality	Time	Notes
1st place, gold medalist(s)	Pietro Mennea	Italy	20.16	CR
2nd place, silver medalist(s)	Olaf Prenzler	East Germany	20.61	
3rd place, bronze medalist(s)	Peter Muster	Switzerland	20.64	
4	Leszek Dunecki	Poland	20.68	
5	Pascal Barré	France	20.70	
6	Zenon Licznerski	Poland	20.74	
7	Aleksandr Aksinin	Soviet Union	20.87	
8	Vladimir Ivanov	Bulgaria	20.92	
			Wind: -0.2 m/s	
