= 1978 European Athletics Championships – Men's 100 metres =

Men's 100 metres at the 1978 European Athletics Championships
- Venue: Stadion Evžena Rošického
- Location: Prague
- Dates: 29 August (heats); 30 August (semifinals & final)
- Competitors: 28 from 15 nations
- Winning time: 10.27

Medalists
gold medal	Pietro Mennea	Italy
silver medal	Eugen Ray	East Germany
bronze medal	Vladimir Ignatenko	Soviet Union

The men's 100 metres at the 1978 European Athletics Championships was held in Prague, then Czechoslovakia, at Stadion Evžena Rošického on 29 and 30 August 1978.

== Participation ==
According to an unofficial count, 28 athletes from 15 countries participated in the event.

- Austria (1)
- Belgium (2)
- Bulgaria (3)
- Czechoslovakia (3)
- East Germany (2)
- France (2)
- Great Britain (1)
- Greece (1)
- Iceland (1)
- Italy (3)
- Poland (2)
- Soviet Union (3)
- Sweden (2)
- Switzerland (1)
- Yugoslavia (1)

== Results ==
=== Heats ===
29 August

==== Heat 1 ====
Rank	Name	Nationality	Time	Notes
1	Allan Wells	Great Britain	10.40	Q
2	Valeriy Borzov	Soviet Union	10.50	Q
3	Joseph Arame	France	10.59	Q
4	Lambert Micha	Belgium	10.63	Q
5	Franco Fähndrich	Switzerland	10.64	
6	Ladislav Latocha	Czechoslovakia	10.73	
7	Ivaylo Karanyotov	Bulgaria	10.78	
			Wind: 0.0 m/s	

==== Heat 2 ====
Rank	Name	Nationality	Time	Notes
1	Pietro Mennea	Italy	10.19	CR, Q
2	Leszek Dunecki	Poland	10.31	Q
3	Vladimir Ignatenko	Soviet Union	10.38	Q
4	Dragan Zarić	Yugoslavia	10.59	Q
5	Ronald Desruelles	Belgium	10.60	
6	Stefan Nilsson	Sweden	10.62	
7	Otakar Wild	Czechoslovakia	10.73	
			Wind: 0.0 m/s	

==== Heat 3 ====
Rank	Name	Nationality	Time	Notes
1	Eugen Ray	East Germany	10.30	Q
2	Marian Woronin	Poland	10.50	Q
3	Stefano Curini	Italy	10.58	Q
4	Kenth Rönn	Sweden	10.58	Q
5	Pierrick Thessard	France	10.79	
6	Gernot Massing	Austria	10.86	
7	Veselin Panov	Bulgaria	10.90	
			Wind: 0.0 m/s	

==== Heat 4 ====
Rank	Name	Nationality	Time	Notes
1	Petar Petrov	Bulgaria	10.44	Q
2	Nikolay Kolesnikov	Soviet Union	10.49	Q
3	Lambros Kefalas	Greece	10.53	Q
4	Giovanni Grazioli	Italy	10.55	Q
5	Alexander Thieme	East Germany	10.55	
6	Zdeněk Mazur	Czechoslovakia	10.73	
7	Vilmundur Vilhjálmsson	Iceland	10.76	
			Wind: 0.0 m/s	

=== Semi-finals ===
30 August

==== Semi-final 1 ====
Rank	Name	Nationality	Time	Notes
1	Pietro Mennea	Italy	10.26	Q
2	Vladimir Ignatenko	Soviet Union	10.45	Q
3	Petar Petrov	Bulgaria	10.46	Q
4	Valeriy Borzov	Soviet Union	10.53	Q
5	Marian Woronin	Poland	10.54	
6	Kenth Rönn	Sweden	10.63	
7	Stefano Curini	Italy	10.72	
8	Lambert Micha	Belgium	10.74	
			Wind: 0.0 m/s	

==== Semi-final 2 ====
Rank	Name	Nationality	Time	Notes
1	Eugen Ray	East Germany	10.30	Q
2	Leszek Dunecki	Poland	10.38	Q
3	Allan Wells	Great Britain	10.38	Q
4	Nikolay Kolesnikov	Soviet Union	10.43	Q
5	Giovanni Grazioli	Italy	10.58	
6	Lambros Kefalas	Greece	10.60	
7	Joseph Arame	France	10.64	
8	Dragan Zarić	Yugoslavia	10.69	
			Wind: -0.8 m/s	

=== Final ===
30 August

Rank	Lane	Name	Nationality	Time	Notes
1st place, gold medalist(s)	7	Pietro Mennea	Italy	10.27	
2nd place, silver medalist(s)	6	Eugen Ray	East Germany	10.36	
3rd place, bronze medalist(s)	1	Vladimir Ignatenko	Soviet Union	10.37	
4	4	Petar Petrov	Bulgaria	10.41	
5	8	Leszek Dunecki	Poland	10.43	
6	3	Allan Wells	Great Britain	10.45	
7	2	Nikolay Kolesnikov	Soviet Union	10.46	
8	5	Valeriy Borzov	Soviet Union	10.55	
				Wind: 0.0 m/s	
