= Eduardo Costa (disambiguation) =

Eduardo Costa (born 1982) is a Brazilian football player.

Eduardo Costa may also refer to:

- Eduardo Costa (judoka) (born 1977), Argentine judoka
- Eduardo Costa (athlete) (born 1954), Mozambican sprinter
- Eduardo Costa (singer), Brazilian sertanejo singer
