= Nigeria at the 1980 Summer Olympics =

- IOC code: NGR
- NOC: Nigeria Olympic Committee

in Moscow
- Competitors: 50
- Medals: Gold 0 Silver 0 Bronze 0 Total 0

Summer Olympics appearances (overview)
- 1952; 1956; 1960; 1964; 1968; 1972; 1976; 1980; 1984; 1988; 1992; 1996; 2000; 2004; 2008; 2012; 2016; 2020; 2024; 2028

Nigeria competed at the 1980 Summer Olympics in Moscow, USSR. The nation returned to the Olympic Games after boycotting the 1976 Summer Olympics.

== Results by event ==
=== Athletics ===
Men's 100 metres

- Peter Okodogbe

- Heat — 10.39
- Quarterfinals — 10.34
- Semifinals — 10.51 (→ did not advance)

- Samson Oyeledun

- Heat — 10.59
- Quarterfinals — 10.73 (→ did not advance)

- Hammed Adio

- Heat — 10.58
- Quarterfinals — 10.67 (→ did not advance)

Men's 200 metres

- Hammed Adio

- Heat — 21.79 (→ did not advance)

Men's 4×400 metres Relay

- Sunday Uti, Hope Ezeigbo, Felix Imadiyi, and Dele Udo

- Heat — 3:14.1 (→ did not advance)

Men's Long Jump

- Kayode Elegbede

- Qualification — 7.82 m
- Final — 7.49 m (→ 11th place)

- Jubobosaye Kio

- Qualification — 7.77 m (→ did not advance)

- Yusuf Alli

- Qualification — 7.43 m (→ did not advance)

Women's 100 metres

- Oguzoeme Nsenu

- Heat — 11.72
- Quarterfinals — 11.55 (→ did not advance)

- Rufina Ubah

- Heat — 11.75
- Quarterfinals — 11.60 (→ did not advance)

=== Boxing ===
Men's Bantamweight (54 kg)

- Nureni Gbadamosi
  1. First Round — Bye
  2. Second Round — Lost to Michael Anthony (Guyana) on points (5-0)

Men's Featherweight (57 kg)

- William Azanor
  1. First Round — Bye
  2. Second Round — Lost to Tsacho Andreikovski (Bulgaria) after knock-out in first round

Men's Lightweight (60 kg)

- Christopher Ossai
  1. First Round — Lost to Richard Nowakowski (East Germany) on points (0-5)

Men's Light-Welterweight (63,5 kg)

- Peter Aydele
  1. First Round — Lost to Farouk Jawad (Iraq) on points (0-5)

Men's Heavyweight (+ 81 kg)

- Solomon Ataga
  1. First Round — Lost to Teófilo Stevenson (Cuba) after knock-out in first round

=== Football (soccer) ===
==== Men's team competition ====
- Preliminary Round (Group B)

- Lost to Kuwait (1-3)
- Drew with Czechoslovakia (1-1)
- Lost to Colombia (0-1)

- Quarter Finals

- Did not advance

Team Roster

- Best Ogedegbe
- Moses Effiong
- David Adiele
- Sylvanus Okpala
- Leotis Boateng
- John Orlando
- Tunde Bamidele
- Isima Okey
- Shefiu Mohamed
- Alloysius Atuegbu
- Henry Nwosu
- Felix Owolabi
- Mudashiru Lawal
- Adokie Amiesimaka
- Emmanuel Osigwe
- Kadiri Ikhana
