= Men's 4 × 200 metres relay world record progression =

The following table shows the world record progression in the men's 4 × 200 metres relay in athletics.

Time	Team	Nationality	Location	Date	Participants	Event
1:27.8	University of Pennsylvania	United States	Philadelphia	1919-06-07	Sherman Landers, F. S. Davis, W. C. Haymond, Elmer Smith	Penn Relays
1:27.4	New York AC	United States	Pasadena	1921-07-05	Bernard Wefers, Jr., Lovejoy, Ray, Farell	
1:25.8	University of Southern California	United States	Los Angeles	1927-05-14	House, Herschel Curry Smith, Borah, Lewis	
1:25.0	Stanford University	United States	Fresno	1937-05-15	Jim Kneubuhl, Stan Hiserman, Ray Malott, Jack Weiershauser	West Coast Relays
1:24.4	University of Southern California	United States	Fresno	1949-05-14	Mel Patton, Ron Frazier, George Pasquali, Norman Stocks	West Coast Relays
1:24.0	University of Southern California	United States	Fresno	1949-05-20	Mel Patton, Ron Frazier, George Pasquali, Norman Stocks	West Coast Relays
1:23.8	United States	United States	Sydney	1956-12-05	Leamon King, Andy Stanfield, Thane Baker, Bobby Morrow	
1:22.7	Texas University	United States	Austin	1957-04-05	Wally Wilson, Eddie Southern, Hollis Gainey, Bobby Whilden	Texas Relays
1:22.6	Abilene Christian College	United States	Modesto	1958-05-31	Bill Woodhouse, James Segrest, George Peterson, Bobby Morrow	Modesto Relays
1:22.1	San Jose State College	United States	Fresno	1967-05-13	Ken Shackelford, George Talmadge, Lee Evans, Tommie Smith	West Coast Relays
1:21.5	Italy	Italy	Barletta	1972-07-21	Pietro Mennea, Franco Ossola, Pasqualino Abeti, Luigi Benedetti	
1:21.4	Arizona State University	United States	Philadelphia	1977-04-30	Gary Burl, Tony Darden, Gerald Burl, Herman Frazier	Penn Relays
1:20.26	University of Southern California	United States	Tempe	1978-05-27	Tom Andrews, James Sanford, Billy Mullins, Clancy Edwards	Sun Devil Relay Classic
1:19.38	Santa Monica Track Club	United States	Koblenz	1989-08-23	Danny Everett, Leroy Burrell, Floyd Heard, Carl Lewis	
1:19.11	Santa Monica Track Club	United States	Philadelphia	1992-04-25	Michael Marsh, Leroy Burrell, Floyd Heard, Carl Lewis	Penn Relays
1:18.68	Santa Monica Track Club	United States	Walnut	1994-04-20	Michael Marsh, Leroy Burrell, Floyd Heard, Carl Lewis	Mt. SAC Relays
1:18.63	Jamaica	Jamaica	Nassau	2014-05-24	Nickel Ashmeade, Warren Weir, Jermaine Brown, Yohan Blake	IAAF World Relays
