= Ilídio =

- Pronunciation: Portuguese: [iˈliðiu]
- Gender: Male

Origin
- Origin: Portuguese
- Meaning: From the latin "illidius", meaning enlightned

Other names
- Related names: Ilidio

Ilídio is a Portuguese language masculine given name, and may refer to:

- Ilídio Machado (1914-) co-founder of Angola's MPLA liberation movement
- Ilídio Vale (1957-) manager of the Portuguese U-19 football team
- Ilídio Vieira Té (1983-), Bissau-Guinean politician
- Vítor Ilídio Castanheira Penas (1977-), a Portuguese footballer
- Carlos Ilídio Moreno Gomes a.k.a. Piguita (1970-), Cape Verdean footballer
- Ilídio Matusse (1975-), Mozambican swimmer
- Ilídio Coelho (1960-), Angolan sprinter
- Ilídio Silva (1932-2018), Portuguese rower
- pt:Ilídio do Amaral (1926-), Portuguese geographer
- pt:Ilídio de Araújo (1925-), Portuguese landscape architect
- Ilídio Pinto Leandro (1950-), Brazilian bishop, Bishop of Viseu
- Ilídio da Costa Leite de Pinho (1938-), Portuguese businessman, founder of pt:Fundação Ilídio Pinho for the promotion of science
- pt:Ilídio Botelho Gonçalves (1922-2011), Portuguese forestry expert
