= Hammed =

Hammed may refer to:

== People ==
- Hammed Adio (b. 1959), Nigerian sprinter
- Hammed Animashaun (b. 1991), British actor

=== Surname ===
- Aymen Hammed (b. 1983), Tunisian handball player
- Mohamed Hammed (b. 1987), Tunisian archer

== See also ==
- Hamed
