= Aleksandr Kozlov =

Aleksandr Kozlov or Alexnder Kozlov (Russian: Александр Козлов) may refer to:

- Aleksandr Kozlov (hammer thrower) (born 1952), Soviet hammer thrower
- Aleksandr Kozlov (footballer) (1993–2022), Russian footballer
- Aleksandr Kozlov (politician, born 1949), Russian politician
- Alexander Kozlov, Russian politician
