= Peter Klein (athlete) =

German sprinter (born 1959)

Personal information
- Born: 21 February 1959 (age 67) Schötmar, North Rhine-Westphalia, West Germany

Sport
- Sport: Track and field
Medal record
Representing West Germany
European Championships
Bronze medal – third place	1982 Athens	4×100 m

Peter Klein (born 21 February 1959) is a retired West German sprinter who specialized in the 100 metres. He was a double national champion in the 100 m and 200 metres at the 1990 West German Athletics Championships, making him the last champion of those events before East and West German athletes resumed a shared competition.

At the 1982 European Championships he helped win the 4 x 100 metres relay with teammates Christian Zirkelbach, Christian Haas and Erwin Skamrahl. He finished fifth at the 1984 Summer Olympics and sixth at the 1988 Summer Olympics, both times in the relay. He also competed at the 1986 European Championships, the 1987 World Championships and the 1990 European Championships without reaching the finals.

Peter Klein represented the sports team SV Salamander Kornwestheim.
