= Salif Koné =

Malian sprinter

Personal information
- Nationality: Malian

Sport
- Sport: Sprinting
- Event: 100 metres

Salif Koné is a Malian sprinter. He competed in the men's 100 metres at the 1980 Summer Olympics.
