= Nikolaos Angelopoulos =

Greek sprinter

Personal information
- Born: 15 March 1958 (age 68) Patra, Greece
- Occupation: Athlete
- Height: 5 ft 11 in (180 cm)
- Weight: 176 lb (80 kg)

Nikolaos Angelopoulos was a Greek sprinter. He competed in the 200 meter race at the 1980 Summer Olympics in Moscow, USSR.
