= Ivaylo Karanyotov =

Bulgarian sprinter

Ivaylo Karanyotov (Bulgarian: Ивайло Караньотов, born 26 February 1958) is a retired Bulgarian sprinter who specialized in the 100 metres.

He was born in Sofia. He reached the semi-final in the 60 metres at the 1977 European Indoor Championships. He competed in the 100 metres at the 1980 Olympic Games without reaching the final. In the 4 x 100 metres relay, the Bulgarian team (Karanyotov, Vladimir Ivanov, Pavel Pavlov and Petar Petrov) finished sixth. He won the 1981 Balkan Championships. At the 1982 European Championships he finished eighth in the 4 x 100 metres relay together with Nikolay Markov, Petar Petrov and Ivan Tuparov.

He became Bulgarian champion in both 100 and 200 metres in 1981. Indoor, he won the 50 metres title in 1981 and the 200 metres title in 1983.

His personal best jump time was 10.33 seconds, achieved in 1982.
