= Perumal Subramanian =

Indian sprinter

Personal information
- Nationality: Indian
- Born: 12 November 1955 (age 70)

Sport
- Sport: Sprinting
- Event: 200 metres

Perumal Subramanian (born 12 November 1955) is an Indian sprinter. He competed in the men's 200 metres at the 1980 Summer Olympics.
