= Pietro Farina (athlete) =

Italian sprinter

Personal information
- Nationality: Italian
- Born: 5 February 1955 (age 71) Belgioioso, Lombardy, Italy

Sport
- Event: 200 metres
- Coached by: Eraldo Costa
Medal record
Representing Italy
Summer Universiade
Silver medal – second place	1977 Sofia	4x100m relay

Pietro Farina (born 5 February 1955) is an Italian sprinter and later sprint coach.

He competed in the men's 200 metres at the 1976 Summer Olympics. At the 1977 Summer Universiade, Farina won a silver medal in the 4 × 100 metres relay and competed in the 200 metres, reaching the semi-final in the latter event.

Farina is from the Italian town of Belgioioso, Lombardy. Upon returning from his Olympic participation, Farina was celebrated by a ceremony held on 8 August 1976, at which then-mayor Zanaboni Angelo attended and presented Farina with an award.

Farina's athletics career lasted from about 1976 to 1986. He retired in part due to experiencing peritonitis after racing against Pietro Mennea, his then-roommate and friend.

For several years following his retirement, Farina was the head coach of the Annabella Pavia basketball team.

On 12 September 2013, Farina commemorated his countryman Pietro Mennea on Mennea Day in Lombardy.

In 2019 and 2021, Farina was an athletics coach in Italy.

As of 2022, Farina is the coach of the Athletica 100 Torri athletics club.
