= Charles Kachenjela =

Zambian sprinter

Personal information
- Nationality: Zambian
- Born: 1 January 1955 (age 71)

Sport
- Sport: Sprinting
- Event: 100 metres

Charles Kachenjela (born 1 January 1955) is a Zambian sprinter. He competed in the men's 100 metres at the 1980 Summer Olympics.
