= Aleksandr Stasevich =

Personal information
- Full name: Aleksandr Arkadyevich Stasevich
- Nationality: Soviet
- Born: 14 October 1953 (age 72)

Sport
- Sport: Sprinting
- Event: 200 metres

Aleksandr Arkadyevich Stasevich (born 14 October 1953) is a Soviet sprinter. He competed in the men's 200 metres at the 1980 Summer Olympics.
