= Marc Larose =

Seychellois sprinter

Personal information
- Nationality: Seychellois
- Born: Marc Larose; 23 June 1959 (age 67)
- Height: 178 cm (5 ft 10 in)
- Weight: 68 kg (150 lb)

Sport
- Sport: Sprinting
- Event: 100 metres

Marc Larose (born 23 June 1959) is a Seychellois sprinter. He competed in the men's 100 metres, men's 4 x 100 metres relay and the men's 4 x 400 metres relay at the 1980 Summer Olympics.
