= Michael Davis (athlete) =

Jamaican sprinter

Personal information
- Nationality: Jamaican
- Born: 21 July 1959 (age 66)

Sport
- Sport: Sprinting
- Event: 4 × 100 metres relay

Michael Davis (born July 21, 1959) is a Jamaican sprinter. He participated in the 4 × 100 metres relay at the men's 4 × 100 metres relay during the 1980 Summer Olympics.
