= Rudolph George =

Sierra Leonean sprinter (born 1957)

Personal information
- Nationality: Sierra Leonean
- Born: 8 June 1957 (age 69)

Sport
- Sport: Sprinting
- Events: 100 metres, 200 metres, 4 * 100 metres relay

Achievements and titles
- Olympic finals: 1980 Summer Olympics

Rudolph George (born 8 June 1957) is a Sierra Leonean sprinter. He competed in the men's 100 metres, 200 metres and 4 × 100 metres relay at the 1980 Summer Olympics, and was eliminated in the first round in each event.
