= Pascal Aho =

Beninese sprinter

Personal information
- Nationality: Beninese

Sport
- Sport: Sprinting
- Events: 100 metres & 200 metres

Pascal Aho is a Beninese sprinter. He competed in the men's 100 metres and the men's 200 metres at the 1980 Summer Olympics.
