= Oberg =

Oberg is a surname. Notable people with the surname include:

- Berthold von Oberg (died 1494), Roman Catholic prelate and Auxiliary Bishop of Mainz
- Carl Oberg (1897–1965), high ranking member of the SS in Nazi Germany
- Dawn Oberg (born c.1965), American singer-songwriter and pianist
- Evan Oberg (both 1988), Canadian ice hockey player
- James Oberg (born 1944), American space journalist and historian
- Lyle Oberg (born 1960), Canadian politician in Alberta
- Kalervo Oberg (1901–1973), Canadian anthropologist
- Matt Oberg (born 1976), American actor
- Margo Oberg (born 1953), American surfer
- Metta von Oberg (1737–1794), German baroness
- Ralph Oberg (1899–1961), American art director
- Scott Oberg (born 1990), American baseball player

== Places ==
- Oberg, Germany, a village in Ilsede, Lower Saxony

== See also ==
- Öberg, a Swedish surname
- Eilhart von Oberge (fl. late 12th century), German poet
