= Osvaldo Lara =

Cuban sprinter (1955–2024)

Personal information
- Born: July 13, 1955 Havana, Cuba
- Died: January 2, 2024 (aged 68)

Sport
- Sport: Track and field
Medal record
Representing Cuba
Pan American Games
Silver medal – second place	1979 San Juan	4x100m relay
Silver medal – second place	1983 Caracas	4x100m relay
Central American and Caribbean Games
Gold medal – first place	1982 Havana	4x100m relay
Gold medal – first place	1986 Santiago	4x100m relay
Silver medal – second place	1978 Medellin	100m
Silver medal – second place	1978 Medellin	4x100m relay
Silver medal – second place	1982 Havana	100m
Silver medal – second place	1982 Havana	200m
Summer Universiade
Bronze medal – third place	1977 Sofia	100m

Osvaldo Lara Cañizares (July 13, 1955 – January 2, 2024) was a Cuban male track and field sprinter, who represented his native country at the 1980 Summer Olympics in Moscow, Soviet Union. He reached both 100m and 200m finals where he finished 5th in the 100m. And 8th in the 200m.

In 1984, he missed the Los Angeles Olympics due to the boycott, but he competed at the Friendship Games in Moscow, where he won the 100 metres.

Lara died on January 2, 2024, at the age of 68.

== International competitions ==
Representing Cuba & Americas
Year	Competition	Venue	Position	Event	Notes
1977	Central American and Caribbean Championships	Xalapa, Mexico	3rd	100 m	10.63
1977	Central American and Caribbean Championships	Xalapa, Mexico	2nd	200 m	21.13
1977	Central American and Caribbean Championships	Xalapa, Mexico	1st	4 × 100 m relay	39.86
1977	Universiade	Sofia, Bulgaria	3rd	100 m	10.31
1977	Universiade	Sofia, Bulgaria	10th (sf)	200 m	21.59
1977	Universiade	Sofia, Bulgaria	4th	4 × 100 m relay	39.31
1977	World Cup	Düsseldorf, West Germany	3rd	4 × 100 m relay	38.56
1978	Central American and Caribbean Games	Medellín, Colombia	2nd	100 m	10.11
1978	Central American and Caribbean Games	Medellín, Colombia	2nd	4 × 100 m relay	39.44
1979	Spartakiad	Moscow, Soviet Union	3rd	100 m	10.41
1979	Pan American Games	San Juan, Puerto Rico	6th	100 m	10.47
1979	Pan American Games	San Juan, Puerto Rico	7th	200 m	21.00
1979	Pan American Games	San Juan, Puerto Rico	2nd	4 × 100 m relay	39.14
1979	World Cup	Montreal, Canada	1st	4 × 100 m relay	38.70
1980	Olympic Games	Moscow, Soviet Union	5th	100 m	10.43
1980	Olympic Games	Moscow, Soviet Union	8th	200 m	21.19
1980	Olympic Games	Moscow, Soviet Union	–	4 × 100 m relay	DNF
1981	Central American and Caribbean Championships	Santo Domingo, Dominican Republic	3rd	4 × 100 m relay	39.96
1982	Central American and Caribbean Games	Havana, Cuba	2nd	100 m	10.26
1982	Central American and Caribbean Games	Havana, Cuba	2nd	200 m	20.94
1982	Central American and Caribbean Games	Havana, Cuba	1st	4 × 100 m relay	39.15
1983	Pan American Games	Caracas, Venezuela	4th	100 m	10.21
1983	Pan American Games	Caracas, Venezuela	2nd	4 × 100 m relay	38.55
1984	Friendship Games	Moscow, Soviet Union	1st	100 m	10.17
1984	Friendship Games	Moscow, Soviet Union	2nd	4 × 100 m relay	38.79
1985	Central American and Caribbean Championships	Nassau, Bahamas	2nd	100 m	10.30
1986	Central American and Caribbean Games	Santiago, Dominican Republic	5th	100 m	10.51
1986	Central American and Caribbean Games	Santiago, Dominican Republic	1st	4 × 100 m relay	38.74
1986	Ibero-American Championships	Havana, Cuba	2nd	4 × 100 m relay	39.46
