= Issa Fall =

Senegalese sprinter

Personal information
- Nationality: Senegalese
- Born: 1947 (age 78–79)

Sport
- Sport: Sprinting
- Event: 4 × 100 metres relay

Issa Fall (born 1947) is a Senegalese sprinter. He competed in the men's 4 × 100 metres relay at the 1980 Summer Olympics.
