= Christian Zirkelbach =

West German sprinter

Medal record

Men's athletics

Representing West Germany

European Championships
Bronze medal – third place	1982 Athens	4×100 m

Christian Zirkelbach (born 20 December 1961, in Würzburg) is a retired West German sprinter who specialized in the 100 metres.

At the 1982 European Championships helped win the 4 × 100 metres relay with teammates Christian Haas, Peter Klein and Erwin Skamrahl. He also participated in the 100 metres, but did not reach the final. At the 1984 Summer Olympics he ran in the first round for the relay team.

Christian Zirkelbach represented the sports team LAC Quelle Fürth.

Since 2009, Christian Zirkelbach has been a professor of mathematics, statistics, operations research and informatics at the University of Applied Sciences Würzburg-Schweinfurt (FHWS).
