= Lambros Kefalas =

Greek sprinter

Lambros Kefalas (born 10 August 1953) is a Greek Olympic sprinter. He competed in the 100 meter sprint at the 1980 Summer Olympics in Moscow.
