= Grégoire Illorson =

Cameroonian sprinter

Personal information
- Nationality: Cameroonian
- Born: 6 June 1954
- Died: 2 March 2016 (aged 61)

Sport
- Sport: Sprinting
- Event: 100 metres

Grégoire Illorson (6 June 1954 – 2 March 2016) was a Cameroonian sprinter. He competed in the men's 100 metres at the 1980 Summer Olympics.
