= Lotta Öberg =

Swedish poet

- Born: 1818; Stockholm, Sweden
- Died: 21 June 1856 (aged 37–38)
- Writing career
- Notable work: Lyriska dikter

Maria Charlotta "Lotta" Öberg (1818 – 21 June 1856) was a Swedish poet.

== Life ==
Maria Charlotta Öberg was born in Stockholm in 1818 to a charwoman and a carpenter. Due to health, she was unable to attend school as a child.

Her poems were read at the salon of a rich woman, for whom her mother worked, which made her discovered. She was placed in a pension by Count Gustaf af Wetterstedt, and was able to attend school.

Between 1834 and 1841, she published the collection Lyriska dikter (Lyrical poems) which was given the assessment: "They [her poems] give witness of a deep and warm emotion, which in a simple, innocent and touching way reminds of the tones from the great poets, from which she was inspired".

Öberg died 21 June 1856, aged 38. Her death was reported in the press.
