= Eduardo Costa (athlete) =

Mozambican sprinter

Personal information
- Nationality: Mozambican
- Born: 24 July 1954 (age 71)

Sport
- Sport: Sprinting
- Event: 100 metres

Eduardo Alberto Gomes Costa (born 24 July 1954) is a Mozambican former sprinter. Costa would compete at the 1980 Summer Olympics in Moscow, representing Mozambique in men's athletics. He would be one of the first athletes to represent the nation at an Olympic Games as they would make their debut at this edition.

He competed in the men's 100 metres at the 1980 Summer Olympics, being the first Mozambican sprinter to do. In the heats, he would set a personal best in the distance but would not advance to the quarterfinals of the event.

== Biography ==
Eduardo Albert Gomes Costa was born on 24 July 1954. Costa would compete at the 1980 Summer Olympics in Moscow in what was then the Soviet Union (now located in Russia), representing Mozambique in one men's athletics event. He would be one of the first Mozambican athletics competitors and one of the first Mozambican sportspeople overall to compete at an Olympic Games, as the nation would make its official debut at the Olympic Games at this edition of the competition.

Costa's event at the 1980 Summer Games would be the men's 100 metres sprint. There, he would compete in the heats of the event on 24 July 1980 against six other athletes in the second heat. Costa would run in a time of 11.02 seconds, setting a new personal best in the event. In the round, he would place fifth and would not advance further to the quarterfinals held on the same day. Although he did not advance, he would be the first Mozambican sprinter to compete in the event at a Summer Olympics.
