= Ilídio Coelho =

Angolan sprinter

Personal information
- Full name: Ilídio Sirgado Coelho Sirgado
- Nationality: Angolan
- Born: 23 July 1960 (age 65) Luanda, Angola
- Height: 169 cm (5 ft 7 in)
- Weight: 56 kg (123 lb)

Sport
- Sport: Sprinting
- Event: 100 metres

Ilídio Coelho (born 23 July 1960) is an Angolan sprinter. He competed in the men's 100 metres at the 1980 Summer Olympics at the age of 19. He was entered to race in heat 4 and finished 7th out of 8 sprinters with a time of 11.42 seconds, 0.13 seconds faster than last place finisher Besha Tuffa of Ethiopia.
