= Joseph Letseka =

Lesotho athlete

Personal information
- Nationality: Lesotho
- Born: 28 March 1953 (age 73)

Sport
- Sport: Sprinting
- Event: 100 metres

Joseph Letseka (born 28 March 1953) is a Lesotho sprinter. He competed in the men's 100 metres at the 1980 Summer Olympics.
