= West Coast Relays =

Track and field event in Fresno, California

Started April 30, 1927, the West Coast Relays grew to one of the premier track and field events in the United States. Held in Fresno's Ratcliffe Stadium, it was the site of thirty-six world records and many national and collegiate records. It became the home of the debut of some of the Central Valley's best known athletes; Bob Mathias, Dutch Warmerdam, Rafer Johnson, Tommie Smith and Henry Ellard. Participants included future stars of other sports; Jackie Robinson, O. J. Simpson, Willie Gault, and Bill Russell.

The delay in replacing the outdated clay track at Ratcliffe Stadium damaged the meet and the event was discontinued after the 1982 edition. The meet was revived in 1991 as the Bob Mathias Fresno Relays and was held at Warmerdam Field at Fresno State.

By 2006 the meet moved again to Buchanan High School in Clovis, California. The revived West Coast Relays since then has been an annual high school-only track and field meet.

The Shuttle hurdle relay is one of many type relays that were offered at the West Coast Relays.
