= Karin Öberg =

Swedish astrochemist

- Born: Karin Ingegerd Öberg; August 27, 1982 (age 44); Nyköping, Sweden
- Education: California Institute of Technology, Leiden University
- Known for: Discovering the first complex molecule in a protoplanetary disk
- Awards: Hubble Postdoctoral Fellowship, Alfred P. Sloan Fellowship in Physics, Packard Fellowship for Science and Engineering
- Scientific career
- Fields: Astrochemistry, Astronomy
- Workplaces: Harvard University, University of Virginia
- Thesis: Complex processes in simple ices: Laboratory and observational studies of gas-grain interactions during star formation (2009)
- Website: https://karinoberg.cfa.harvard.edu/

Karin Ingegerd Öberg (born August 27, 1982) is a Swedish astrochemist. She is a Professor of Astronomy at Harvard University and leader of the Öberg Astrochemistry Group at the Center for Astrophysics | Harvard & Smithsonian. Her research concerns star formation, planet formation, and stellar evolution in relation to organic molecules, which are necessary to determine the origins of life on Earth and elsewhere. In April 2015, her group discovered the first complex organic molecule in a protoplanetary disk.

== Early life ==
Karin Öberg was born in Nyköping, Sweden. At age 6, her family relocated to Karlskrona, where she spent the rest of her childhood. She was raised alongside two brothers, and attended public primary, secondary, and high schools. In 2001, Öberg's high school chemistry teacher signed her up for the local Chemistry Olympiad. She qualified for the international competition, being one of four students to represent Sweden. Also during her senior year at the Chapmanskolan gymnasium, she conducted a project under the supervision of her father, which resulted in her first publication.

== Education ==
Öberg was educated at the California Institute of Technology and graduated cum laude in 2005 with a Bachelor of Science degree in Chemistry. She has said that "Caltech was a birth through fire experience into science, which taught [her] to think, to ask questions, and to solve problems as [she] scarcely had thought [her] mind capable of." During her time as an undergraduate, she was a member of physical chemistry and astrochemistry research, and published two scientific papers based on her work in the groups.

Following her undergraduate studies, Öberg took up a Ph.D. position at Leiden University in the Netherlands under the supervision of Ewine van Dishoeck and Harold Linnartz. She spent four years combining laboratory simulation and astronomical observation to study the chemistry and dynamics of interstellar ice. This research led to a thesis, titled "Complex processes in simple ices: Laboratory and observational studies of gas-grain interactions during star formation." Öberg presented the different chapters at conferences worldwide and several institutions in the United States. The doctoral thesis was defended on September 16, 2009. Besides conducting this research, Öberg supervised two M.Sc. projects and served as a teaching assistant for courses on Pulsars and research for undergraduate students. She graduated cum laude with a Ph.D. in Astronomy from Leiden University in 2009.

== Career ==
After Öberg received her Ph.D. in 2009, NASA awarded her a Hubble Postdoctoral Fellowship. She used this funding to research at the Center for Astrophysics | Harvard & Smithsonian until August 2012. During this time, she studied the radioastronomical observations of organic molecules in young stars, such as protoplanetary disks and protostars.

Next, Öberg worked at the University of Virginia as a visiting scholar and Assistant Professor of Chemistry and Astronomy until June 2013. She conducted laboratory ice experiments and studied spatially- and spectrally-determined astronomical observations, both of which focused on the processes that take place during the chemical evolution of a planet or star.

Öberg returned to Harvard in July 2013 as an Assistant Professor of Astronomy. Here, she formed the Öberg Astrochemistry Group. This group conducts research at the Center for Astrophysics | Harvard & Smithsonian.

Öberg serves on the board of the Society of Catholic Scientists, and is an advisor of the Purposeful Universe Project.

== Research ==
As of 2021, Öberg has published over 130 refereed articles, at least 36 of those as the first author, and has been cited over 11,000 times. Her main domain of work currently pertains to astrochemistry and its effect on planet formation. The Öberg Astrochemistry Group, her current research group, states that their main research addresses the following:

1. the chemical evolution present during star and planet formation and its effects on planet compositions,

2. the fundamental physical chemical processes that underpin this evolution,

3. and the development of new molecular probes of different aspects of star and planet formation.

The group's research is composed of laboratory ice simulations and radio and infrared observations of astronomical behaviors and information.

=== Discovery of a complex molecule in a protoplanetary disk ===
On April 9, 2015, the Öberg Astrochemistry Group published a paper stating they detected the first complex carbon molecule in a protoplanetary disk, this molecule being methyl cyanide. Methyl cyanide (CH_{3}CN) is thought to be important for the origins of life because it contains carbon-nitrogen bonds, which make up amino acids, the building blocks of proteins. Up until this discovery, it was unclear if these molecules could exist in abundance in young disks because of their turbulent and chaotic nature. Using the Atacama Large Millimeter/submillimeter Array (ALMA), Öberg's group was able to survey the orbital debris of the newly formed star MWC 480, to discover enough methyl cyanide to fill all of Earth's oceans and the presence of other simpler molecules such as hydrogen cyanide. This discovery is significant because it shows that the backbone of life, complex carbon bonds, are not exclusive to the Solar System. In an interview, Öberg stated that comet records suggest the presence of complex organic molecules in other protoplanetary disks as well.

The finding was published in the scientific journal Nature (volume 520), titled "The comet-like composition of a protoplanetary disk as revealed by complex cyanides." It also had media coverage in The Washington Post and LA Times, along with a press release from the National Radio Astronomy Observatory (NRAO).

== Personal life ==
As a child, Öberg was confirmed in the Church of Sweden, but soon after became agnostic. Her later conversion to Catholicism was partly inspired by G. K. Chesterton's Orthodoxy, having remained a devout Catholic ever since.

== Selected publications ==
- Öberg, K.; Linnartz, H.; Visser, R.; Van Dishoeck, E. (2009). "Photodesorption of Ices. II. H2O and D2O". The Astrophysical Journal. 693 (2): 1209–1218. arXiv:0812.1918. Bibcode:2009ApJ...693.1209O. doi:10.1088/0004-637x/693/2/1209. S2CID 9500068.
- Öberg, K.; Guzmán, V.; Furuya, K.; Qi, C.; Aikawa, Y.; Andrews, S.; Wilner, D. (2015). "The comet-like composition of a protoplanetary disk as revealed by complex cyanides". Nature. 520 (7546): 198–201. arXiv:1505.06347. Bibcode:2015Natur.520..198O. doi:10.1038/nature14276. PMID 25855455. S2CID 205242974.
- Öberg, K.; Boogert, A.; Pontoppidan, K.; Blake, G.; Evans, N.; Lahuis, F.; Dishoeck, E. (2008). "The c2d Spitzer Spectroscopic Survey of Ices around Low-Mass Young Stellar Objects. III. CH 4" (PDF). The Astrophysical Journal. 678 (2): 1032–1041. arXiv:0801.1223. Bibcode:2008ApJ...678.1032O. doi:10.1086/533432. hdl:2152/35166. S2CID 119257957.

== Awards and honors ==
- 2001- Swedish representative in the International Chemistry Olympiad
- 2009- Hubble Postdoctoral Fellow
- 2010– C.J. Kokpriijs award for best Ph.D. thesis at Leiden University
- 2012– Paul Hertelendy (PH) Lecturer, Center for Astrophysics | Harvard & Smithsonian
- 2012– Alfred P. Sloan Research Fellow in Physics
- 2014– Simons Collaboration on the Origins of Life (SCOL) Investigator award
- 2014– Packard Fellow for Science and Engineering
- 2024– Barry Prize for Distinguished Intellectual Achievement by the American Academy of Sciences and Letters.
