= Vladimir Ivanov (sprinter) =

Bulgarian sprinter (1955–2020)

Vladimir Vasilev Ivanov (Bulgarian: Владимир Василев Иванов; 23 April 1955 – 26 November 2020) was a Bulgarian sprinter who specialized in the 200 metres.

He was born in Sofia, and represented the club Slavia. He competed in 400 metres at the 1980 European Indoor Championships. At the 1980 Olympics he reached the quarter-final of the 200 metres, and in the 4 x 100 metres relay the Bulgarian team (Pavel Pavlov, Ivanov, Ivaylo Karanyotov and Petar Petrov) finished sixth.

He won the Balkan Championships in 1978, 1979 and 1982. He became Bulgarian 100 metres champion in 1975, and 200 metres champion in 1979 and 1980. He became 400 metres indoor champion in 1980.

His personal best times were 10.40 seconds in the 100 metres, achieved in 1979; and 20.74 seconds in the 200 metres, achieved in 1978.

Ivanov died from COVID-19 complications on 26 November 2020. He was 65.
