= František Břečka =

Czech sprinter

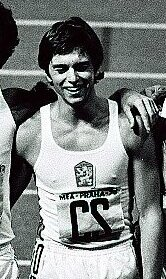
- Břečka in 1978

Personal information
- Nationality: Czech
- Born: 21 June 1958 (age 68)

Sport
- Sport: Sprinting
- Event: 200 metres

František Břečka (born 21 June 1958) is a former Czechoslovak sprinter. He competed in the men's 200 metres at the 1980 Summer Olympics.
