= Eugen Ray =

East German sprinter (1957–1986)

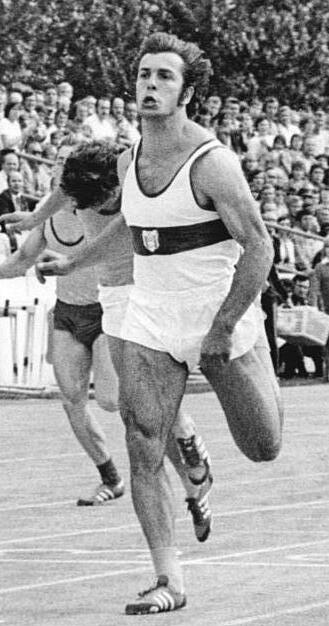
- Ray in 1977

Personal information
- Born: 26 July 1957 Gerbstedt, Bezirk Halle, East Germany
- Died: 9 January 1986 (aged 28) Leipzig, East Germany
- Height: 182 cm (6 ft 0 in)
- Weight: 87 kg (192 lb)
- Spouse: Marlies Ray

Sport
- Sport: Sprint
- Club: SV Halle
Medal record
Men's athletics
Representing East Germany
European Championships
Silver medal – second place	1978 Prague	100 m
Silver medal – second place	1978 Prague	4×100 m
IAAF World Cup
Silver medal – second place	1977 Düsseldorf	100 m
Silver medal – second place	1977 Düsseldorf	4×100 m

Eugen Ray (26 July 1957 – 9 January 1986) was an East German sprinter who ran in the 100 metres and 200 metres. He was born in Gerbstedt, Bezirk Halle, East Germany and died in Leipzig, East Germany.

== Biography ==
Ray set a world junior 100 m record of 10.16 seconds. He was East German 100 metres champion in 1977, 1978, and 1980. In 1978 he also won the East German indoor 60 metres titles, as well as twice indoor 100 metre champion.

He was European cup semi finalist 100 metre champion in 1975, 1977, and 1979. And in 1977 he was European cup 100/200 metre winner. After this he then went on to the World Cup held in West Germany where he came second in the 100 metres narrowly beaten by Steve Williams of the USA. He then finished 2nd again with the German sprint relay team. A year later he was European silver medallist in the 100 metres and 4 × 100 metres.

In 1980, he went to the Summer Olympics in Moscow where he ran in the 100 metres, but did not make it past the semi-final. He was in the East German relay team that finished fifth in the final. His 100 m personal best was 10.12 seconds.

Ray died aged 28 on 9 January 1986 in a car crash whilst working as a traffic officer in East Germany. He was survived by his wife Marlies Ray who at the time was pregnant with their son.

== See also ==
- German all-time top lists – 100 metres
- German all-time top lists – 200 metres
