= Detlef Kübeck =

East German sprinter (born 1956)

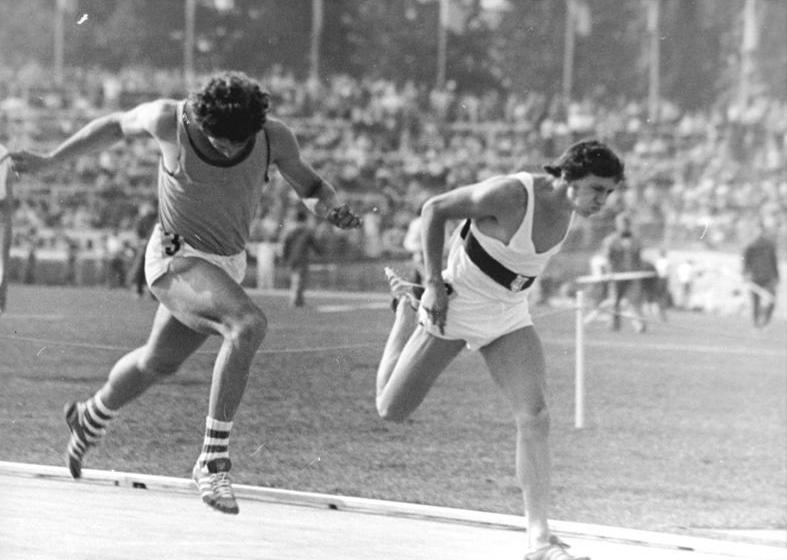
- Detlef Kübeck (left) and Bernhard Hoff (right) in 1977

Medal record

Men's athletics

Representing East Germany

IAAF World Cup
| Silver medal – second place | 1977 Düsseldorf | 4 × 100 metre relay |

European Championships
| Silver medal – second place | 1982 Athens | 4 × 100 metre relay |

Detlef Kübeck (born 22 February 1956 in Schwerin, Bezirk Schwerin) is a retired German sprinter who Represented East Germany in the 200 metres.

At the 1982 European Championships he won a silver medal in the 4 × 100 metres relay with teammates Thomas Munkelt, Olaf Prenzler and Frank Emmelmann. He also competed in the 200 metres, but did not reach the final. He became East German champion in 1982.

== Achievements ==
| Year | Tournament | Venue | Result | Event |
|---|---|---|---|---|
| 1982 | European Championships | Athens, Greece | 2nd | 4 × 100 m |
