= Pavel Pavlov (sprinter) =

Bulgarian sprinter

Pavel Georgiev Pavlov (Bulgarian: Павел Георгиев Павлов, 8 March 1952 – 3 December 2004) was a Bulgarian sprinter who specialized in the 200 meters.

He was born in Plovdiv, and represented the clubs Akademik Sofia, CSKA and Botev Vratsa. He competed in 400 metres at the 1978 European Indoor Championships. At the 1980 Olympics he reached the quarter-final of the 200 metres, and in the 4 x 100 metres relay the Bulgarian team (Pavlov, Vladimir Ivanov, Ivaylo Karanyotov and Petar Petrov) finished sixth.

He became Bulgarian 200 metres champion in 1975 and 1978. His personal best times were 10.3 seconds in the 100 metres, achieved in 1976; and 20.87 seconds in the 200 metres, achieved in 1979.

Following his death in 2004, an annual competition in Sofia was created in his honour.
