= Dawn Oberg =

- Born: 1965 or 1966 (age 60–61); Minneapolis, Minnesota, United States
- Genres: Cabaret, jazz
- Occupation: Singer-songwriter
- Instruments: Piano, vocals
- Website: www.dawnoberg.com

Dawn Oberg is an American singer-songwriter and pianist. Her music is influenced by multiple genres, including jazz and cabaret.

== Career ==
Oberg was born and grew up in Minnesota, where she wrote her first song at the age of 14. She later wrote what she called "perverse drinking songs" throughout her twenties. She attended Berklee College of Music in Boston, after which she moved to Nashville in the mid-1990s. While in Nashville, she played in multiple country music bands, during which time she recalls having been influenced by Bob Dylan and Hank Williams, before switching to playing piano-based songs influenced by R&B and jazz. The first band she played in was Honky-Tonk Happy Hour; she contributed to their first album before leaving to form a cabaret duo called Blossom Theory, in which she played piano. In 2008, she released her first solo album, Horticulture Wars, followed by Rye in 2013 and Bring in 2015.

== Reception ==
A review of Bring in L.A. Record said that, with regard to lyricism, Oberg "has all [the] lightly mocking wiseass of Noël Coward plus a sentimental side very much in the old Master’s line, if completely beyond most of his imitators past and present." Robert Christgau also reviewed Bring favorably, giving it an A− grade. In his review, he wrote, "Delivering nine expertly wrought songs in 27 minutes, [Oberg] plays acoustic piano over G-B-D with jazz gestalt, zero-plus solos, and a beat more martial than swinging." ChicagoPride.com contributor Gregg Shapiro wrote that Oberg "deserves a place alongside contemporaries such as Ben Folds and Aimee Mann," writing that on her songs, "Her lived-in voice is that of experience and she maintains a singular sense of humor." Mic's Dan Weiss named Oberg's song "Nothing Rhymes with Orange" one of the 16 best anti-Donald Trump songs of 2017.

== Musicians with whom Oberg has recorded ==
Horticulture Wars

Chris Carmichael: strings, arranging; Dave Henry: cello; Matt Martin: drums; Al Perkins: pedal steel; Joe Pisapia: pedal steel; Jim Hoke: pedal steel, flute, clarinet, arranging; Kirby Shelstad: vibes; Jody Spence: drums

Recorded by Robin Eaton

Produced by Robin Eaton and Dawn Oberg

Mastered by Marc Chevalier

Rye

Denny Geyer: guitar on track 11; Andrew Launcher: drums; Dave Mihaly: drums; Bill Noertker: bass; Roger Rocha: guitar; Chris Von Sneidern: guitar on track 1; Erik Ian Walker: B3; Jeff Brown: bartending

Recorded by Nathan Winter at Hyde St. Studios

Bring

Mark Corradetti: bass; Billy Mason: drums; Roger Rocha: guitar; Erik Ian Walker; Jim Hoke: wind arrangement on track 4

Recorded by Nathan Winter

Mastered by Michael Romanowski

It's 12:01

Mark Corradetti: bass; Micah Dubreuil: B3; Andrew Laubacher: drums; Roger Rocha: guitar

Recorded by Scott McDowell

Mastered by Piper Payne

Nothing Rhymes With Orange

Andrew Laubacher: drums; Shawn Miller: bass; Roger Rocha: guitar; Erik Ian Walker: B3

Recorded by Nathan Winter

Mastered by Jonathan Rego at Coast Mastering

== Discography ==
- Horticulture Wars (2008)
- Rye (2013)
- Bring (2015)
- Salvation Army Santa (single) (2015)
- It's 12:01 (single) (2016)
- Nothing Rhymes With Orange (EP) (2017)
