= Sören Schlegel =

German sprinter

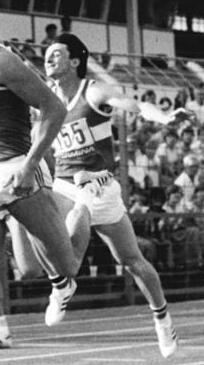
- Schlegel in 1986

Personal information
- Nationality: German
- Born: 28 December 1960 (age 65)

Sport
- Sport: Sprinting
- Event: 100 metres

Sören Schlegel (born 28 December 1960) is a German former sprinter. He competed in the men's 100 metres at the 1980 Summer Olympics representing East Germany.
