= Aleksandr Kozlov (hammer thrower) =

Soviet hammer thrower

Personal information
- Born: 5 January 1952 (age 74)

Sport
- Sport: Track and field
Medal record
Representing Soviet Union
Summer Universiade
Bronze medal – third place	1977 Sofia	Hammer throw

Aleksandr Kozlov (Russian: Александр Козлов; born 5 January 1952) is a retired male hammer thrower, who represented the Soviet Union during his career. He set his personal best (78.58 metres) on 24 May 1980 at a meet in Adler, Soviet Union. His was the bronze medalist from the 1977 Summer Universiade.

== Achievements ==
Year	Competition	Venue	Position	Notes
Representing Soviet Union
1977	Universiade	Sofia, Bulgaria	3rd	72.40 m
