= Bernhard Hoff =

East German sprinter

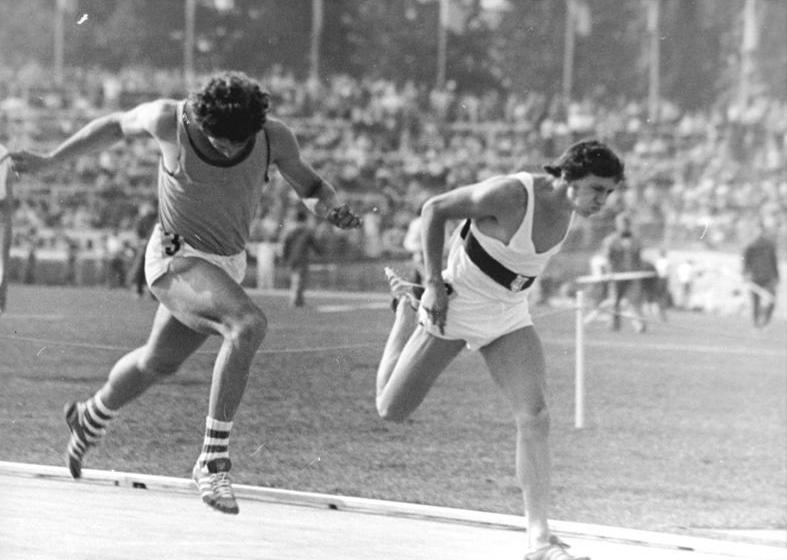
Detlef Kübeck (left) and Bernhard Hoff (right) in 1977

Bernard Hoff (born 10 January 1959) is a former East German sprinter who specialised in the 200 metres.

== Biography ==
In 1977 he was European Junior 200-metre champion and 4×400 metres; he also won a Silver in 4×100 metres and Bronze in the 100 metres. He was East German 200-metre champion in 1977, 1979 and 1980. He competed at the 1980 Summer Olympics in Moscow in the 200 metres where he reached the final and finished 5th (Pietro Mennea took the gold). His relay team also took 5th in the 4 × 100 m. His personal best on 200 metres (20.39), at the 2012 is the ninth best German performance of all time.

== See also ==
- German all-time top lists – 200 metres
