= Erwin Skamrahl =

German sprinter (born 1958)

Personal information
- Full name: Erwin Richard Skamrahl
- Born: 8 March 1958 (age 68) Oberg, Lahstedt, West Germany
Medal record
Men's athletics
Representing West Germany
World Championships
Silver medal – second place	1983 Helsinki	4×400 m
European Championships
Gold medal – first place	1982 Athens	4×400 m
Bronze medal – third place	1982 Athens	4×100 m
European Indoor Championships
Gold medal – first place	1982 Milan	200 m

Erwin Richard Skamrahl (born 8 March 1958) is a retired German track and field athlete who competed in the 200 and 400 metres.

== Biography ==
At the 1982 European Championships he finished fourth in the 200 metres, won a bronze medal in the 4 × 100 metres relay and a gold medal in the 4 × 400 metres relay. Earlier that year he had won the 200 m at the 1982 European Indoor Championships in a new championship record of 21.20 seconds.

At the 1983 World Championships he finished fourth in the 400 metres and won a silver medal in the 4 × 400 metres relay. He then competed in the 1984 Olympic relay, finished eighth in 400 m at the 1986 European Championships and fifth in 200 m at the 1987 European Indoor Championships.

His personal best time in 400 m was 44.50 seconds, achieved in July 1983 in Munich. This ranks him second among German 400 m sprinters, only behind Thomas Schönlebe who ran 44.33 seconds. In 200 m, his best time was 20.44 seconds, only 0.01 second behind Norbert Dobeleit and Stefan Holz who occupy the top two places on the German all-time ranking.

Records
Preceded by (Soviet Union) Viktor Markin	European Record Holder Men's 400 m 26 July 1983 - 20 August 1987	Succeeded by (East Germany) Thomas Schonlebe
