= Frank Emmelmann =

East German sprinter (born 1961)

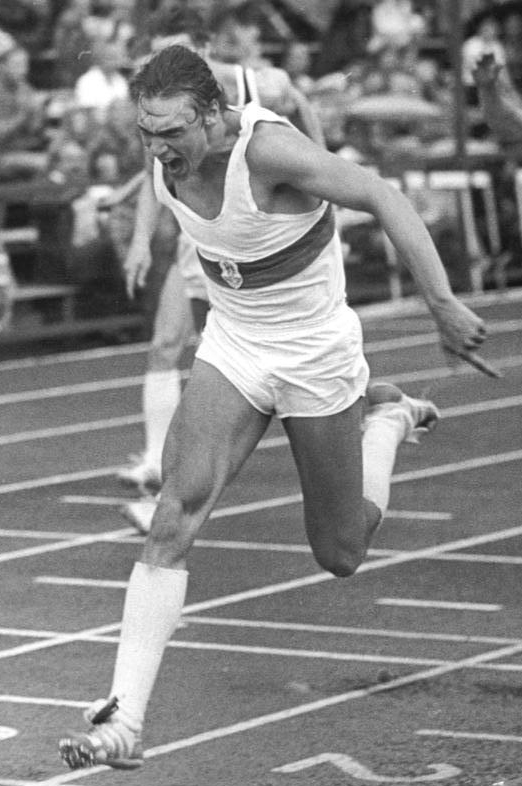

Personal information
- Born: 15 September 1961 (age 64) Groß Börnecke, East Germany
Medal record
Men's athletics
Representing East Germany
European Championships
Gold medal – first place	1982 Athens	100 metres
Silver medal – second place	1982 Athens	4 × 100 metres
Silver medal – second place	1986 Stuttgart	4 × 100 metres
Bronze medal – third place	1982 Athens	200 metres
European Cup
Gold medal – first place	1981 Zagreb	200 metres
Gold medal – first place	1983 London	100 metres
Gold medal – first place	1985 Moscow	200 metres
Silver medal – second place	1981 Zagreb	100 metres
Bronze medal – third place	1985 Moscow	100 metres
World Cup
Silver medal – second place	1981 Rome	4 × 100 relay
Silver medal – second place	1985 Canberra	200 metres
Bronze medal – third place	1981 Rome	100 metres
Bronze medal – third place	1981 Rome	200 metres
Bronze medal – third place	1985 Canberra	100 metres

Frank Emmelmann (born 15 September 1961 in Groß Börnecke) is a retired East German sprinter who specialized in the 100 and 200 metres.

== Biography ==
In 1981, Emmelmann finished 2nd in the European cup final in the 100 metres to the 1980 Moscow Olympic 100 metre Champion Allan Wells. Emmelmann went on to win the European cup 200 metres afterwards. Then, Emmelmann finished 3rd in the 100/200 in the "IAAF World cup" in Rome also that year.

At the 1982 European Championships, Emmelmann won the 100 metres and finished third in the 200 metres. In the 4 × 100 metres relay, he won a silver medal with teammates Thomas Munkelt, Detlef Kübeck and Olaf Prenzler.

At the 1986 European Championships Emmelmann made the 200 metre final in Stuttgart where he finished 8th, but won a silver medal in the 4 × 100 metres relay with teammates Thomas Schröder, Steffen Bringmann and Olaf Prenzler.

In 1983, Emmelmann won the European cup final 100 metres in London, then went on to finish 5th in the 200 metre final at the "IAAF World Championships" in Helsinki. He competed in the 100 m as well, but did not make it past the semi-final.

Emmelmann represented the sports team SC Magdeburg and became East German 100 meter champion in 1981, 1982 and 1985 and 200 meter champion in 1981, 1984, 1985, 1987 and 1988.

His personal 100 meter best time of 10.06 seconds, achieved in June 1986 in Berlin, remained the German record until 2014 when Julian Reus clocked 10.05 seconds during the German Athletics Championships in Ulm. His personal 200 meter best time of 20.23 seconds, achieved in August 1985 in Moscow, was the German record until July 2005, when Tobias Unger ran in 20.20.

In 1991, Emmelmann attempted to become a professional American football player, trying out for the WLAF's inaugural season, but later backed out before joining a team.

Emmelmann is married to Kirsten Emmelmann, née Siemon.

== See also ==
- German all-time top lists – 100 metres
- German all-time top lists – 200 metres
