= Nikolay Sidorov =

Soviet sprinter (born 1956)

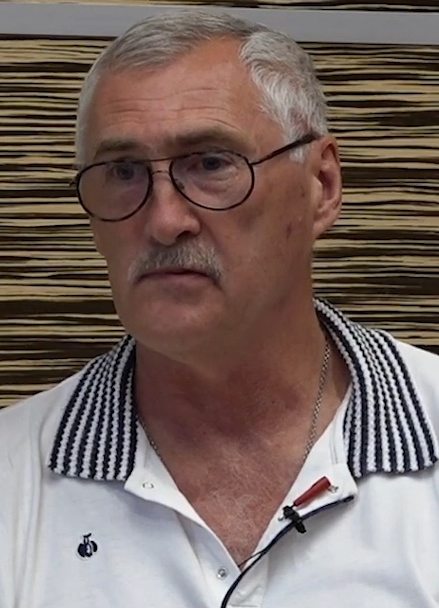
- Sidorov in 2021

Personal information
- Native name: Николай Александрович Сидоров
- Born: 23 November 1956 (age 69) Moscow, RSFSR

Sport
- Sport: Track and field
- Club: CSKA Moscow

Achievements and titles
- Olympic finals: 1980 Summer Olympics
- Regional finals: 1982 European Athletics Championships 1983 World Championships in Athletics
Medal record
Representing Soviet Union
Olympic Games
Gold medal – first place	1980 Moscow	4x100m relay
World Championships
Bronze medal – third place	1983 Helsinki	4x100m relay
European Championships
Gold medal – first place	1982 Athens	4x100m relay
Summer Universiade
Silver medal – second place	1981 Bucharest	4x100m relay
Bronze medal – third place	1983 Edmonton	4x100m relay

Nikolay Aleksandrovich Sidorov (Russian: Николай Александрович Сидоров; born 23 November 1956) is a former Soviet track and field athlete who won the Soviet 100 metre championships on two occasions. He was then the winner of the gold medal in the 4 × 100 m relay at the 1980 Summer Olympics.

At the 1980 Olympic Games, Sidorov was eliminated in the semifinal of the 200 m and ran the second leg in the gold medal-winning Soviet 4 × 100 m relay team. At the 1982 European Championships, Sidorov was fifth in the 100 m and won the gold medal as a member of the Soviet 4 × 100 m relay team. He also participated in the first World Championships, where he was eliminated in the heats of the 100 m and won the bronze medal as a member of the Soviet 4 × 100 m relay team.

== International competitions ==
Representing the Soviet Union
Year	Competition	Venue	Position	Event	Result	Notes
1980	Olympic Games	Moscow, Soviet Union	1st	4 × 100 m relay	38.26 s	
1982	European Championships	Athens, Greece	1st	4 × 100 m relay	38.60 s	
1983	World Championships	Helsinki, Finland	3rd	4 × 100 m relay	38.41 s	
1984	Friendship Games	Moscow, Soviet Union	1st	4 × 100 m relay	38.32 s	
