= Athletics at the 1977 Summer Universiade =

Athletics at the IX Summer Universiade
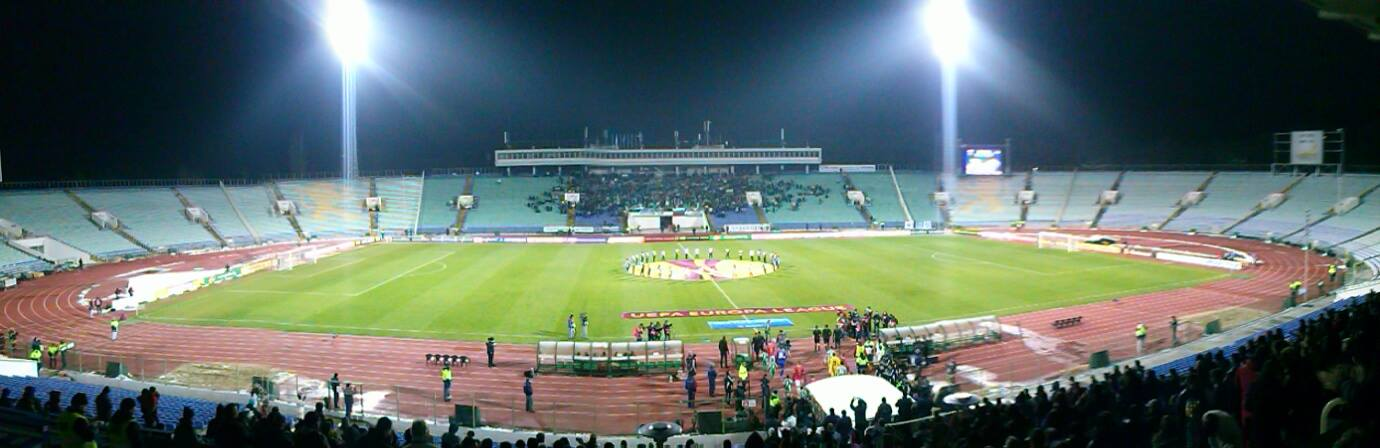
- The host stadium for the events
- Dates: 19–23 August 1977
- Host city: Sofia, Bulgaria
- Venue: Vasil Levski National Stadium
- Level: University
- Events: 34
- Records set: 2 WR

Athletics events were contested at the 1977 Summer Universiade in Sofia, Bulgaria between 19 and 23 August.

== Medal summary ==
=== Men's events ===
Event	Gold		Silver		Bronze	
100 metres (wind: +0.2 m/s)	Silvio Leonard (CUB)	10.08	Petar Petrov (BUL)	10.19	Osvaldo Lara (CUB)	10.31
200 metres (wind: -1.8 m/s)	Clancy Edwards (USA)	20.46	Silvio Leonard (CUB)	20.64	William Snoddy (USA)	21.17
400 metres	Fons Brydenbach (BEL)	45.18	Willie Smith (USA)	45.34	Ryszard Podlas (POL)	45.36
800 metres	Alberto Juantorena (CUB)	1:43.44 WR	Milovan Savić (YUG)	1:45.6	José Marajo (FRA)	1:45.89
1500 metres	Jozef Plachý (TCH)	3:40.2	Mike Kearns (GBR)	3:40.9	Abderrahmane Morceli (ALG)	3:41.0
5000 metres	Enn Sellik (URS)	13:44.6	Jerzy Kowol (POL)	13:45.1	Leonid Moseyev (URS)	13:45.6
10,000 metres	Leonid Moseyev (URS)	29:12.0	Franco Fava (ITA)	29:12.7	Ilie Floroiu (ROM)	29:13.4
110 metres hurdles (wind: +0.6 m/s)	Alejandro Casañas (CUB)	13.21 WR	Jan Pusty (POL)	13.53	Vyacheslav Kulebyakin (URS)	13.55
400 metres hurdles	Tom Andrews (USA)	49.52	Klaus Schönberger (GDR)	49.55	Rolf Ziegler (FRG)	49.72
3000 metres steeplechase	Michael Karst (FRG)	8:25.9	Paul Copu (ROM)	8:28.8	Ron Addison (USA)	8:29.4
4 × 100 metres relay	Soviet Union (URS); Nikolay Kolesnikov; Aleksandr Aksinin; Juris Silovs; Vladimir Ignatenko	38.75	Italy (ITA); Stefano Curini; Stefano Rasori; Pietro Farina; Luciano Caravani	39.15	United States (USA); William Snoddy; Mike Kee; Clancy Edwards; Harvey Glance	39.17
4 × 400 metres relay	United States (USA); Evis Jennings; Willie Smith; Tim Dale; Tom Andrews	3:01.2	Poland (POL); Jerzy Pietrzyk; Henryk Galant; Cezary Łapiński; Ryszard Podlas	3:01.52	West Germany (FRG); Lothar Krieg; Eberhard Schneider; Ulrich Zunker; Rolf Ziegler	3:06.3
High jump	Jacek Wszoła (POL)	2.22	Paul Poaniewa (FRA)	2.19	Aleksandr Grigoryev (URS)	2.19
Pole vault	Władysław Kozakiewicz (POL)	5.55	Tadeusz Ślusarski (POL)	5.50	Vladimir Trofimenko (URS)	5.50
Long jump	Nenad Stekić (YUG)	7.97	Grzegorz Cybulski (POL)	7.95	David Giralt (CUB)	7.92
Triple jump	Anatoliy Piskulin (URS)	17.30w	Ron Livers (USA)	16.96w	Willie Banks (USA)	16.94
Shot put	Valcho Stoev (BUL)	19.55	Nikolai Khristov (BUL)	19.44	Wolfgang Warnemünde (GDR)	18.94
Discus throw	Nikolay Vikhor (URS)	64.14	Vladimir Rayev (URS)	62.42	Wolfgang Warnemünde (GDR)	61.98
Hammer throw	Emanuil Dyulgerov (BUL)	73.50	Yuriy Sedykh (URS)	72.42	Aleksandr Kozlov (URS)	72.40
Javelin throw	Vasiliy Yershov (URS)	81.60	David Ottley (GBR)	81.14	Valentin Dzhonev (BUL)	79.76
Decathlon	Sepp Zeilbauer (AUT)	8097	Valeriy Kachanov (URS)	7958	Rumen Petrov (BUL)	7949

=== Women's events ===
Event	Gold		Silver		Bronze	
100 metres (wind: +0.8 m/s)	Lyudmila Storozhkova (URS)	11.21	Andrea Lynch (GBR)	11.22	Silvia Chivás (CUB)	11.23
200 metres (wind: -2.2 m/s)	Silvia Chivás (CUB)	23.08	Marina Sidorova (URS)	23.09	Andrea Lynch (GBR)	23.23
400 metres	Rosalyn Bryant (USA)	52.10	Natalya Sokolova (URS)	52.15	Beatriz Castillo (CUB)	52.95
800 metres	Totka Petrova (BUL)	1:57.6	Tatyana Kazankina (URS)	1:58.6	Svetla Koleva (BUL)	1:58.9
1500 metres	Totka Petrova (BUL)	4:05.7	Natalia Mărăşescu (ROM)	4:05.8	Maricica Puică (ROM)	4:06.4
100 metres hurdles (wind: -0.6 m/s)	Grażyna Rabsztyn (POL)	12.86	Tatyana Anisimova (URS)	13.03	Natalya Lebedeva (URS)	13.05
4 × 100 metres relay	Soviet Union (URS); Lyudmila Maslakova; Vera Anisimova; Marina Sidorova; Tatyana Prorochenko	43.16	Bulgaria (BUL); Sofka Popova; Atanaska Georgieva; Ivanka Valkova; Lyubina Dimitrova	44.30	Poland (POL); Bogusława Kaniecka; Helena Fliśnik; Ewa Witkowska; Ewa Długołęcka	44.79
High jump	Sara Simeoni (ITA)	1.92	Debbie Brill (CAN)	1.90	Tatyana Boyko (URS)	1.86
Long jump	Jacqueline Curtet (FRA)	6.38	Jarmila Nygrýnová (TCH)	6.35	Jodi Anderson (USA)	6.35
Shot put	Elena Stoyanova (BUL)	19.98	Nina Isayeva (URS)	19.56	Helma Knorscheidt (GDR)	19.29
Discus throw	Mariya Vergova (BUL)	66.34	Svetlana Melnikova (URS)	61.78	Radostina Bakhchevanova (BUL)	61.08
Javelin throw	Nadezhda Yakubovich (URS)	61.42	Ivanka Vancheva (BUL)	61.12	Aranka Vágási (HUN)	61.12
Pentathlon	Valentina Dimitrova (BUL)	4630	Jane Frederick (USA)	4625	Yekaterina Smirnova (URS)	4521

== Medal table ==
Rank	Nation	Gold	Silver	Bronze	Total
1	Soviet Union (URS)	9	9	8	26
2	Bulgaria (BUL)	7	4	4	15
3	United States (USA)	4	3	5	12
4	Cuba (CUB)	4	1	4	9
5	Poland (POL)	3	5	2	10
6	Italy (ITA)	1	2	0	3
7	France (FRA)	1	1	1	3
8	Czechoslovakia (TCH)	1	1	0	2
8	Yugoslavia (YUG)	1	1	0	2
10	West Germany (FRG)	1	0	2	3
11	Austria (AUT)	1	0	0	1
11	Belgium (BEL)	1	0	0	1
13	Great Britain (GBR)	0	3	1	4
14	Romania (ROM)	0	2	2	4
15	East Germany (GDR)	0	1	3	4
16	Canada (CAN)	0	1	0	1
17	Algeria (ALG)	0	0	1	1
17	Hungary (HUN)	0	0	1	1
Totals (18 entries)		34	34	34	102

== See also ==
- FISU World University Games
- University and college sport
