= Clancy Edwards =

American sprinter

Personal information
- Nationality: American
- Born: August 9, 1955 (age 70)

Sport
- Sport: Athletics
- Event: Sprints
Medal record
Men's athletics
Representing the United States
Pan American Games
Gold medal – first place	1975 Mexico City	4 x 100 m relay
IAAF World Cup
Gold medal – first place	1977 Düsseldorf	200 m
Summer Universiade
Gold medal – first place	1977 Sofia	200 m

Clancy Edwards (born August 9, 1955) is an American retired track and field sprinter. He was considered one of the best sprinters in the world between 1974 and 1978. He won the 200 metres at the 1977 IAAF World Cup, the most important meet of that year, defeating future World Record holder Pietro Mennea.

== Early life ==
While in high school, he ran for Santa Ana High School. His 21.32 (converted from a hand time of 21.2) for 220 yards, winning the 1973 CIF California State Meet, was the best time in Orange County, California for 12 years. He was also 2nd in the 100-yard dash.

== Collegiate career and international success ==
Edwards began his collegiate career at Cal Poly in 1974, running for their track team, the Cal Poly Mustangs (where he won titles under the tutelage of coach Steve Simmons).

In August 1975, he won the CCAA Athlete of the Year Award for all sports. During an era when Division II-attending competitors could also advance up to the Division I NCAA Championships, Edwards came in third place at the 1975 Division I finals at BYU in the 220 yards, clocking an All-American time of 20.61 seconds. He missed out on the 1976 Summer Olympics because of injury.

In 1977, he transferred as a junior to the University of Southern California. While at USC he was one of the best sprinters in the world, helping them to the Pac-8 collegiate championship. Also in 1977, Edwards won the first of his two double British AAA Championships title wins in the 100 metres and 200 metres event at the 1977 AAA Championships.

He was ranked (see below) in the American top ten at 200 metres five times between 1974 and 1979 including #1 in 1977 and 1978. Worldwide those rankings were not much different, ranking #1 in 1978 and #3 in 1977 behind Mennea and Olympic Champion Don Quarrie. And he was #2 worldwide in 1978 at 100 metres.

Edwards' fastest time over 100 metres was 10.07 seconds, set at Eugene in June 1978. In that year, Edwards achieved the remarkable 'double-double' of winning the 100 and 200 m events at both the NCAA (United States collegiate) and AAU (United States National) Championships. He was the first to do this since Hal Davis in 1943. That same year he also recorded the world's best yearly performance in the men's 200 metres at the dual meet against crosstown rival UCLA in Westwood, Los Angeles, clocking 20.03 on April 29, 1978. In both 1977 and 1978 he was awarded the Pac-10 Track Athlete of the Year.

Also in 1978, Edwards ran the anchor leg of a University of Southern California team (with Joel Andrews, James Sanford and William Mullins) that broke the world record in 4 × 200 m relay event with a time of 1.20.26 at Tempe, Arizona on 27 May. They broke the record even though they came second in the race. The team that won from the Tobias Striders track team was multi-national and so was not eligible to hold the record; that team of Guy Abrahams, Michael Simmons, Don Quarrie and James Gilkes recorded a time of 1.20.23.

Injury ruined his 1979 season, although he did win another sprint double at the British 1979 AAA Championships. The following year, the United States boycott of the 1980 Olympics meant he lacked the motivation to re-find his best form and to carry on with his track career post-1980 onto the next Olympics.

== Track and field rankings ==
Edwards was ranked among the best in the US and the world in the 100 yard/100 metre and 200 yard/200 metre sprint events in the period 1974-79, according to the votes of the experts of Track and Field News.

100 meters
Year	World rank	US rank
1974	-	6th
1975	-	8th
1976	-	-
1977	5th	3rd
1978	2nd	1st
1979	-	-

200 meters
Year	World rank	US rank
1974	9th	3rd
1975	-	6th
1976	-	-
1977	3rd	1st
1978	1st	1st
1979	10th	6th

== See also ==
- Track and Field News Interview with Clancy Edwards by Jon Hendershott, November 1978.

Sporting positions
Preceded by (Cuba) Silvio Leonard	Men's 200 m Best Year Performance; 1978	Succeeded by (Italy) Pietro Mennea
