= Sheku Boima =

Sierra Leonean sprinter

Personal information
- Nationality: Sierra Leonean
- Born: 7 October 1952 (age 73)

Sport
- Sport: Sprinting
- Event: 100 metres

Sheku Boima (born 7 October 1952) is a Sierra Leonean sprinter. He competed in the men's 100 metres at the 1980 Summer Olympics.
