= William Snoddy =

American sprinter

Personal information
- Born: December 6, 1957 (age 68) Tulsa, Oklahoma, United States

Sport
- College team: Oklahoma Sooners
Medal record
Representing United States
Summer Universiade
Bronze medal – third place	1977 Sofia	200m
Bronze medal – third place	1977 Sofia	4x100m relay

William Snoddy (born December 6, 1957) is a former sprinter from the United States. He achieved most success in the 200-meter dash where he was NCAA champion in 1977.

In 1978, Snoddy ran the 100-meter dash in a heavily wind-assisted time of 9.87 seconds – then the fastest time ever recorded for a 100 m race. The wind speed was recorded at 25 mph.

== Track career ==
Snoddy was a star sprinter at Nathan Hale High School setting a state age record in the 220 y dash of 21.0 s, and won two state championships at the distance in consecutive years, 1975 and 1976. Snoddy attended the University of Oklahoma.

As a college freshman, Snoddy became NCAA champion (US collegiate champion) in 1977 over 200 m. He recorded a winning time of 20.48 s, then a low-altitude meeting record, at Champaign, Illinois on June 4. The following year, as a college sophomore, he was second, recording a time of 20.28 s at the meeting in Eugene, Oregon on June 3.

On 1 April 1978, at a meet in Dallas, Texas, Snoddy ran 100 m in the wind-assisted time of 9.87 s then the fastest time ever recorded for a 100 m race. (Note: The wind reading was 11.2 m/s, well in excess of the allowable wind reading for a valid record of 2.0 m/s - Progression of IAAF World Records 2011 Edition, Editor Imre Matrahazi, IAAF Athletics, p viii.)

He also won Indoor College Conference titles at 300 yards in 1977 and 1978., setting the University of Oklahoma record of 29.47 s in 1978.

Snoddy returned to run track again in the 1980s after a hiatus. He achieved some moderate success - in 1987 he won the New Year Sprint race (110 m handicap race) in Scotland.

== Later life ==
Snoddy left college early after two years and joined the United States Navy. He later worked as a water supervisor for the city of Houston and in airport security for TSA, the airport-security organization.

== Rankings ==
Snoddy was ranked in the top ten 200 m sprinters in the world in 1977 and 1978, according to the votes of the experts of Track and Field News.

200 m
Year	World rank	US rank
1977	8th	4th
1978	8th	3rd
