= Peter Muster =

Swiss sprinter

Personal information
- Nationality: Swiss
- Born: 28 May 1952 (age 74) Zurich, Switzerland

Sport
- Sport: Sprinting
- Event: 200 metres
Medal record
Men's athletics
Representing Switzerland
European Championships
Bronze medal – third place	1978 Prague	200 m

Peter Muster (born 28 May 1952) is a Swiss sprinter. He competed in the men's 200 metres at the 1976 Summer Olympics.

At the 1978 European Athletics Championships, Muster won a bronze medal in the 200 metres.
