= 1982 European Athletics Championships =

13th European Athletics Championships
- The logo of the 1982 European Athletics Championships
- Dates: 6–12 September
- Host city: Athens, Greece
- Venue: Athens Olympic Stadium
- Level: Senior
- Type: Outdoor
- Events: 41
- Participation: 756 athletes from 29 nations

The 13th European Athletics Championships were held from 6 September to 12 September 1982 at the Olympic Stadium in Athens, Greece. Contemporaneous reports on the event were given in the Glasgow Herald.

== Men's results ==
Complete results were published.

=== Track ===
1974 | 1978 | 1982 | 1986 | 1990 |

Event	Gold		Silver		Bronze	
100 metres	Frank Emmelmann; East Germany	10.21	Pierfrancesco Pavoni; Italy	10.25	Marian Woronin; Poland	10.28
200 metres	Olaf Prenzler; East Germany	20.46	Cameron Sharp; Great Britain	20.47	Frank Emmelmann; East Germany	20.60
400 metres	Hartmut Weber; West Germany	44.72 CR	Andreas Knebel; East Germany	45.29	Viktor Markin; Soviet Union	45.30
800 metres	Hans-Peter Ferner; West Germany	1:46.33	Sebastian Coe; Great Britain	1:46.68	Jorma Härkönen; Finland	1:46.90
1500 metres	Steve Cram; Great Britain	3:36.49	Nikolay Kirov; Soviet Union	3:36.99	José Manuel Abascal; Spain	3:37.04
5000 metres	Thomas Wessinghage; West Germany	13:28.90	Werner Schildhauer; East Germany	13:30.03	David Moorcroft; Great Britain	13:30.42
10,000 metres	Alberto Cova; Italy	27:41.03	Werner Schildhauer; East Germany	27:41.21	Martti Vainio; Finland	27:42.51
Marathon	Gerard Nijboer; Netherlands	2:15:16	Armand Parmentier; Belgium	2:15:51	Karel Lismont; Belgium	2:16:04
110 metres hurdles	Thomas Munkelt; East Germany	13.41	Andrey Prokofyev; Soviet Union	13.44	Arto Bryggare; Finland	13.60
400 metres hurdles	Harald Schmid; West Germany	47.48 CR	Aleksandr Yatsevich; Soviet Union	48.60	Uwe Ackermann; East Germany	48.64
3000 metres steeplechase	Patriz Ilg; West Germany	8:18.52	Bogusław Mamiński; Poland	8:19.22	Domingo Ramón; Spain	8:20.48
20 kilometres walk	José Marín; Spain	1:23:43 CR	Jozef Pribilinec; Czechoslovakia	1:25:55	Pavol Blažek; Czechoslovakia	1:26:13
50 kilometres walk	Reima Salonen; Finland	3:55:29	José Marín; Spain	3:59:18	Bo Gustafsson; Sweden	4:01:21
4 × 100 metres relay	Sergey Sokolov; Aleksandr Aksinin; Andrey Prokofyev; Nikolay Sidorov; Soviet Union	38.60	Detlef Kübeck; Olaf Prenzler; Thomas Munkelt; Frank Emmelmann; East Germany	38.71	Christian Zirkelbach; Christian Haas; Peter Klein; Erwin Skamrahl; West Germany	38.71
4 × 400 metres relay	Erwin Skamrahl; Harald Schmid; Thomas Giessing; Hartmut Weber; West Germany	3.00.51 CR	David Jenkins; Garry Cook; Todd Bennett; Phil Brown; Great Britain	3.00.68	Aleksandr Troshchilo; Pavel Roshchin; Pavel Konovalov; Viktor Markin; Soviet Union	3.00.80

=== Field ===
1974 | 1978 | 1982 | 1986 | 1990 |

Event	Gold		Silver		Bronze	
High jump	Dietmar Mögenburg; West Germany	2.30 m =CR	Janusz Trzepizur; Poland	2.27 m	Gerd Nagel; West Germany	2.24 m
Pole vault	Aleksandr Krupskiy; Soviet Union	5.60 m CR	Vladimir Polyakov; Soviet Union	5.60 m =CR	Atanas Tarev; Bulgaria	5.60 m =CR
Long jump^{[nb1]}	Lutz Dombrowski; East Germany	8.41 m w	Antonio Corgos; Spain	8.19 m	Jan Leitner; Czechoslovakia	8.08 m
Triple jump	Keith Connor; Great Britain	17.29 m CR	Vasiliy Grishchenkov; Soviet Union	17.15 m	Béla Bakosi; Hungary	17.04 m
Shot put	Udo Beyer; East Germany	21.50 m CR	Jānis Bojārs; Soviet Union	20.81 m	Remigius Machura; Czechoslovakia	20.59 m
Discus throw	Imrich Bugár; Czechoslovakia	66.64 m	Ihor Duhinets; Soviet Union	65.60 m	Wolfgang Warnemünde; East Germany	64.20 m
Hammer throw	Yuriy Sedykh; Soviet Union	81.66 m CR	Igor Nikulin; Soviet Union	79.44 m	Sergey Litvinov; Soviet Union	78.66 m
Javelin throw	Uwe Hohn; East Germany	91.34 m	Heino Puuste; Soviet Union	89.56 m	Detlef Michel; East Germany	89.32 m
Decathlon	Daley Thompson; Great Britain	8774 pts CR	Jürgen Hingsen; West Germany	8517 pts	Siegfried Stark; East Germany	8433 pts

- ^{nb1} Lutz Dombrowski from East Germany jumped 8.25 m in the qualification round, which was a new championship record.

== Women's results ==
=== Track ===
1974 | 1978 | 1982 | 1986 | 1990 |

Event	Gold		Silver		Bronze	
100 metres	Marlies Göhr; East Germany	11.01 CR	Bärbel Wöckel; East Germany	11.20	Rose-Aimée Bacoul; France	11.29
200 metres	Bärbel Wöckel; East Germany	22.04 CR	Kathy Smallwood; Great Britain	22.13	Sabine Rieger; East Germany	22.51
400 metres	Marita Koch; East Germany	48.16 CR, WR	Jarmila Kratochvílová; Czechoslovakia	48.85	Taťána Kocembová; Czechoslovakia	50.55
800 metres	Olga Mineyeva; Soviet Union	1:55.41 CR	Lyudmila Veselkova; Soviet Union	1:55.96	Margrit Klinger; West Germany	1:57.22
1500 metres	Olga Dvirna; Soviet Union	3:57.80 CR	Zamira Zaytseva; Soviet Union	3:58.82	Gabriella Dorio; Italy	3:59.02
3000 metres	Svetlana Ulmasova; Soviet Union	8:30.28 CR	Maricica Puică; Romania	8:33.33	Yelena Sipatova; Soviet Union	8:34.06
Marathon	Rosa Mota; Portugal	2:36:04	Laura Fogli; Italy	2:36:29	Ingrid Kristiansen; Norway	2:36:39
100 metres hurdles^{[nb1]}	Lucyna Kałek; Poland	12.45 =CR	Yordanka Donkova; Bulgaria	12.54	Kerstin Knabe; East Germany	12.54
400 metres hurdles	Ann-Louise Skoglund; Sweden	54.58 CR	Petra Pfaff; East Germany	54.89	Chantal Réga; France	54.93
4 × 100 metres relay	Gesine Walther; Bärbel Wöckel; Sabine Rieger; Marlies Göhr; East Germany	42.19 CR	Wendy Hoyte; Kathy Smallwood; Bev Callender; Shirley Thomas; Great Britain	42.66	Laurence Bily; Marie-Christine Cazier; Rose-Aimée Bacoul; Liliane Gaschet; France	42.69
4 × 400 metres relay	Kirsten Siemon; Sabine Busch; Dagmar Rübsam; Marita Koch; East Germany	3:19.04 CR, WR	Věra Tylová; Milena Matejkovičová; Taťána Kocembová; Jarmila Kratochvílová; Czechoslovakia	3:22.17	Yelena Didilenko; Irina Olkhovnikova; Olga Mineyeva; Irina Baskakova; Soviet Union	3:22.79

- ^{nb1} Lucyna Kałek also ran 12.45 in the heats, which was a new championship record.

=== Field ===
1974 | 1978 | 1982 | 1986 | 1990 |

Event	Gold		Silver		Bronze	
High jump	Ulrike Meyfarth; West Germany	2.02 m CR	Tamara Bykova; Soviet Union	1.97 m	Sara Simeoni; Italy	1.97 m
Long jump	Vali Ionescu; Romania	6.79 m	Anişoara Cuşmir-Stanciu; Romania	6.73 m	Yelena Ivanova; Soviet Union	6.73 m
Shot put	Ilona Slupianek; East Germany	21.59 m CR	Helena Fibingerová; Czechoslovakia	20.94 m	Nunu Abashidze; Soviet Union	20.82 m
Discus throw	Tsvetanka Khristova; Bulgaria	68.34 m	Mariya Petkova; Bulgaria	67.94 m	Galina Savinkova; Soviet Union	67.82 m
Javelin throw	Anna Verouli; Greece	70.02 m CR	Antje Kempe; East Germany	67.94 m	Sofia Sakorafa; Greece	67.04 m
Heptathlon	Ramona Neubert; East Germany	6664 pts	Sabine Mobius-Paetz; East Germany	6594 pts	Sabine Everts; West Germany	6418 pts

== Medal table ==
* Host nation (Greece)

Rank	Nation	Gold	Silver	Bronze	Total
1	East Germany (GDR)	13	8	7	28
2	West Germany (FRG)	8	1	4	13
3	Soviet Union (URS)	6	12	8	26
4	Great Britain (GBR)	3	5	1	9
5	Czechoslovakia (TCH)	1	4	4	9
6	Italy (ITA)	1	2	2	5
6	Spain (ESP)	1	2	2	5
8	Bulgaria (BUL)	1	2	1	4
8	Poland (POL)	1	2	1	4
10	Romania (ROU)	1	2	0	3
11	Finland (FIN)	1	0	3	4
12	Greece (GRE)*	1	0	1	2
12	Sweden (SWE)	1	0	1	2
14	Netherlands (NED)	1	0	0	1
14	Portugal (POR)	1	0	0	1
16	Belgium (BEL)	0	1	1	2
17	France (FRA)	0	0	3	3
18	Hungary (HUN)	0	0	1	1
18	Norway (NOR)	0	0	1	1
Totals (19 entries)		41	41	41	123

== Participation ==
According to an unofficial count, 777 athletes from 30 countries participated in the event, 21 athletes more than the official number of 756, and one country more than the official number of 29 as published.

- Austria (7)
- Belgium (12)
- Bulgaria (34)
- Cyprus (3)
- Czechoslovakia (28)
- Denmark (9)
- East Germany (65)
- Finland (38)
- France (48)
- Gibraltar (1)
- Great Britain (51)
- Greece (29)
- Hungary (18)
- Iceland (4)
- Ireland (9)
- Italy (55)
- Luxembourg (1)
- Malta (1)
- Netherlands (9)
- Norway (18)
- Poland (37)
- Portugal (11)
- Romania (18)
- Soviet Union (92)
- Spain (24)
- Sweden (55)
- Switzerland (25)
- Turkey (2)
- West Germany (59)
- Yugoslavia (14)

== See also ==
- 1982 in athletics (track and field)

== Notes ==
Differences to competition format since the 1978 European Championships:

New events added:

- Women's marathon
- Women's heptathlon replaces the pentathlon
