= Samson Oyeledun =

Nigerian sprinter

Medal record

Men's athletics

Representing Nigeria

African Championships
Gold medal – first place	1984 Rabat	4×100 m

Samson Olajidie Oyeledun (born 10 January 1954) is a Nigerian former sprinter. He competed in the 1980 Summer Olympics and in the 1984 Summer Olympics. He also competed in the 1982 Commonwealth Games where he won gold in the 4 x 100 metres relay, as well as running in the 100 metres and 200 metres sprint.
