= Hammed Adio =

Nigerian sprinter

Personal information
- Nationality: Nigerian
- Born: 20 January 1959 (age 67)

Sport
- Sport: Sprinting
- Event: 100 metres

Hameed Adio (born 20 January 1959) is a Nigerian sprinter. He competed in the men's 100 metres at the 1980 Summer Olympics. He was also captain of the Nigerian delegation to the games.

He is a former broadcaster with the Nigeria Television Authority serving as the manager sports news while covering the 1998 FIFA World Cup and the 1999 IAAF World Championships in Seville.
