= Peter Okodogbe =

Nigerian sprinter

Peter Okodogbe (born 27 May 1958) is a former sprinter from Nigeria who specialised in the 100 and 200 metres.

Okodobge is from Uromi, Bendel, Nigeria. He initially ran for Phoenix College. He was an All-American sprinter for the Arizona Wildcats track and field team, finishing 8th in the 100 m at the 1981 NCAA Division I Outdoor Track and Field Championships.

In 1978 he won a silver medal at the All Africa Games. In 1980 Okodogbe competed at the Summer Olympics in Moscow, where he ran in the 100/200 metres, and reached the semi-finals of both events. He also ran in the sprint relay which finished 7th in the final.
