= 1983 European Athletics Indoor Championships – Men's 60 metres =

The men's 60 metres event at the 1983 European Athletics Indoor Championships was held on 5 March.

== Medalists ==
Gold	Silver	Bronze
Stefano Tilli; Italy	Christian Haas; West Germany	Valentin Atanasov; Bulgaria

== Results ==
=== Heats ===
First 2 from each heat (Q) and the next 4 fastest (q) qualified for the semifinals.

Rank	Heat	Name	Nationality	Time	Notes
1	1	Valentin Atanasov	Bulgaria	6.61	Q
2	1	Viktor Bryzgin	Soviet Union	6.66	Q
3	2	Selwyn Clarke	Great Britain	6.69	Q
3	3	Arkadiusz Janiak	Poland	6.69	Q
3	4	Christian Haas	West Germany	6.69	Q
6	2	Stefano Tilli	Italy	6.70	Q
7	3	Antoine Richard	France	6.71	Q
8	1	Giovanni Grazioli	Italy	6.72	q
9	4	Aleksandr Yevgenyev	Soviet Union	6.75	Q
10	4	Ferenc Kiss	Hungary	6.77	q
11	4	Gianfranco Lazzer	Italy	6.80	q
12	3	Jarmo Anias	Finland	6.81	q
13	1	Jouko Lehtinen	Finland	6.82	
14	4	Roland Jokl	Austria	6.83	
15	2	Stefan Nilsson	Sweden	6.87	
16	2	Şükrü Çaprazlı	Turkey	6.90	
17	1	Kenth Rönn	Sweden	6.94	
18	3	Tommy Johansson	Sweden	6.95	
19	3	Richard Luxemburger	West Germany	6.95	
	2	Ronald Desruelles	Belgium	DQ	

=== Semifinals ===
First 3 from each semifinal qualified directly (Q) for the final.

Rank	Heat	Name	Nationality	Time	Notes
1	2	Stefano Tilli	Italy	6.62	Q
2	1	Valentin Atanasov	Bulgaria	6.65	Q
2	1	Christian Haas	West Germany	6.65	Q
2	2	Viktor Bryzgin	Soviet Union	6.65	Q
2	2	Antoine Richard	France	6.65	Q
6	1	Arkadiusz Janiak	Poland	6.66	Q
7	1	Aleksandr Yevgenyev	Soviet Union	6.67	
8	2	Selwyn Clarke	Great Britain	6.68	
9	1	Giovanni Grazioli	Italy	6.69	
10	2	Ferenc Kiss	Hungary	6.76	
11	1	Jarmo Anias	Finland	6.78	
11	2	Gianfranco Lazzer	Italy	6.78	

=== Final ===
Rank	Lane	Name	Nationality	Time	Notes
1st place, gold medalist(s)	3	Stefano Tilli	Italy	6.63	
2nd place, silver medalist(s)	5	Christian Haas	West Germany	6.64	
3rd place, bronze medalist(s)	2	Valentin Atanasov	Bulgaria	6.66	
4	1	Antoine Richard	France	6.66	
5	4	Viktor Bryzgin	Soviet Union	6.69	
6	6	Arkadiusz Janiak	Poland	6.70	
