= 1982 European Athletics Championships – Men's 100 metres =

Men's 100 metres at the 1982 European Athletics Championships
- Venue: Olympic Stadium "Spiros Louis"
- Location: Athens, Greece
- Dates: 6 September (heats); 7 September (semifinals & final)
- Competitors: 28 from 13 nations
- Winning time: 10.21

Medalists
gold medal	Frank Emmelmann	East Germany
silver medal	Pierfrancesco Pavoni	Italy
bronze medal	Marian Woronin	Poland

These are the official results of the Men's 100 metres event at the 1982 European Championships in Athens, Greece, held at Olympic Stadium "Spiros Louis" on 6 and 7 September 1982.

== Participation ==
According to an unofficial count, 28 athletes from 13 countries participated in the event.

- Bulgaria (2)
- Czechoslovakia (1)
- East Germany (3)
- France (2)
- Greece (1)
- Hungary (2)
- Italy (3)
- Poland (3)
- Soviet Union (3)
- Sweden (1)
- Switzerland (2)
- United Kingdom (2)
- West Germany (3)

== Results ==
=== Heats ===
6 September

==== Heat 1 ====
Rank	Name	Nationality	Time	Notes
1	Pierfrancesco Pavoni	Italy	10.45	Q
2	Bernard Petitbois	France	10.55	Q
3	Vladimir Muravyov	Soviet Union	10.57	Q
4	Christian Zirkelbach	West Germany	10.59	
5	Krzysztof Zwoliński	Poland	10.61	
			Wind: -0.9 m/s	

==== Heat 2 ====
Rank	Name	Nationality	Time	Notes
1	Christian Haas	West Germany	10.45	Q
2	Thomas Schröder	East Germany	10.54	Q
3	Stefan Burkart	Switzerland	10.59	Q
4	Jim Evans	United Kingdom	10.62	
			Wind: +0.3 m/s	

==== Heat 3 ====
Rank	Name	Nationality	Time	Notes
1	Cameron Sharp	United Kingdom	10.28	Q
2	Nikolay Sidorov	Soviet Union	10.38	Q
3	Olaf Prenzler	East Germany	10.40	Q
4	Kosmas Stratos	Greece	10.45	Q
5	Petar Petrov	Bulgaria	10.48	
6	Werner Bastians	West Germany	10.58	
7	István Tatár	Hungary	10.69	
			Wind: +0.7 m/s	

==== Heat 4 ====
Rank	Name	Nationality	Time	Notes
1	Frank Emmelmann	East Germany	10.30	Q
2	Arkadiusz Janiak	Poland	10.55	Q
3	Ivaylo Karanyotov	Bulgaria	10.61	Q
4	Attila Kovács	Hungary	10.64	
5	Antoine Richard	France	10.66	
6	Gianfranco Lazzer	Italy	10.73	
			Wind: -1.1 m/s	

==== Heat 5 ====
Rank	Name	Nationality	Time	Notes
1	Marian Woronin	Poland	10.20	Q
2	Giovanni Grazioli	Italy	10.43	Q
3	Aleksandr Yevgenyev	Soviet Union	10.44	Q
4	Stefan Nilsson	Sweden	10.50	
5	Zdeněk Mazur	Czechoslovakia	10.55	
6	Franco Fähndrich	Switzerland	10.65	
			Wind: +1.2 m/s	

=== Semi-finals ===
7 September

==== Semi-final 1 ====
Rank	Name	Nationality	Time	Notes
1	Marian Woronin	Poland	10.44	Q
2	Nikolay Sidorov	Soviet Union	10.44	Q
3	Olaf Prenzler	East Germany	10.48	Q
4	Pierfrancesco Pavoni	Italy	10.50	Q
5	Thomas Schröder	East Germany	10.58	
6	Christian Haas	West Germany	10.58	
7	Ivaylo Karanyotov	Bulgaria	10.66	
8	Stefan Burkart	Switzerland	10.77	
			Wind: -2.9 m/s	

==== Semi-final 2 ====
Rank	Name	Nationality	Time	Notes
1	Frank Emmelmann	East Germany	10.30	Q
2	Cameron Sharp	United Kingdom	10.32	Q
3	Bernard Petitbois	France	10.49	Q
4	Kosmas Stratos	Greece	10.50	Q
5	Vladimir Muravyov	Soviet Union	10.58	
6	Aleksandr Yevgenyev	Soviet Union	10.59	
7	Giovanni Grazioli	Italy	10.61	
8	Arkadiusz Janiak	Poland	10.66	
			Wind: +0.5 m/s	

=== Final ===
7 September

Rank	Lane	Name	Nationality	Time	Notes
1st place, gold medalist(s)	1	Frank Emmelmann	East Germany	10.21	
2nd place, silver medalist(s)	7	Pierfrancesco Pavoni	Italy	10.25	NJR
3rd place, bronze medalist(s)	6	Marian Woronin	Poland	10.28	
4	8	Cameron Sharp	United Kingdom	10.28	
5	2	Nikolay Sidorov	Soviet Union	10.32	
6	5	Olaf Prenzler	East Germany	10.35	
7	4	Bernard Petitbois	France	10.50	
8	3	Kosmas Stratos	Greece	12.56	
				Wind: -0.8 m/s	

== See also ==
- 1978 Men's European Championships 100 metres (Prague)
- 1980 Men's Olympic 100 metres (Moscow)
- 1983 Men's World Championships 100 metres (Helsinki)
- 1984 Men's Olympic 100 metres (Los Angeles)
- 1986 Men's European Championships 100 metres (Stuttgart)
- 1987 Men's World Championships 100 metres (Rome)
- 1988 Men's Olympic 100 metres (Seoul)
