= 1987 European Athletics Indoor Championships – Men's 60 metres =

The men's 60 metres event at the 1987 European Athletics Indoor Championships was held on 21 February.

== Medalists ==
Gold	Silver	Bronze
Marian Woronin; Poland	Pierfrancesco Pavoni; Italy	František Ptáčník; Czechoslovakia; Antonio Ullo; Italy

== Results ==
=== Heats ===
First 2 from each heat (Q) and the next 4 fastest (q) qualified for the semifinals.

Rank	Heat	Name	Nationality	Time	Notes
1	4	František Ptáčník	Czechoslovakia	6.60	Q
2	3	Valentin Atanasov	Bulgaria	6.61	Q
2	4	Pierfrancesco Pavoni	Italy	6.61	Q
4	2	Marian Woronin	Poland	6.63	Q
5	1	Antonio Ullo	Italy	6.64	Q
5	3	Ronald Desruelles	Belgium	6.64	Q
7	2	Antoine Richard	France	6.66	Q
7	3	Bruno Marie-Rose	France	6.66	q
9	2	Mike McFarlane	Great Britain	6.67	q
10	1	José Javier Arqués	Spain	6.69	Q
10	4	Anri Grigorov	Bulgaria	6.69	q
12	1	Christian Haas	West Germany	6.71	q
13	1	Elliot Bunney	Great Britain	6.72	
14	1	Viktor Bryzgin	Soviet Union	6.73	
14	2	Attila Kovács	Hungary	6.73	
16	3	Andreas Berger	Austria	6.74	
17	2	Matthias Schlicht	West Germany	6.77	
18	3	Harri Nevavuo	Finland	6.79	
19	4	Max Morinière	France	6.81	
20	4	Ingo Todt	West Germany	6.81	
21	2	Jouni Myllymäki	Finland	6.84	
22	3	Tommy Björnquist	Sweden	6.97	
	4	Einar Sagli	Norway	DNS	

=== Semifinals ===
First 3 from each semifinal qualified directly (Q) for the final.

Rank	Heat	Name	Nationality	Time	Notes
1	1	Marian Woronin	Poland	6.52	Q, CR, AR
2	1	František Ptáčník	Czechoslovakia	6.59	Q
2	1	Antonio Ullo	Italy	6.59	Q, NR
2	2	Pierfrancesco Pavoni	Italy	6.59	Q, =NR
2	2	Valentin Atanasov	Bulgaria	6.59	Q
6	1	Bruno Marie-Rose	France	6.60	
7	2	Antoine Richard	France	6.61	Q
8	1	Mike McFarlane	Great Britain	6.64	
8	2	José Javier Arqués	Spain	6.64	
10	1	Christian Haas	West Germany	6.66	
11	2	Anri Grigorov	Bulgaria	6.67	
12	2	Ronald Desruelles	Belgium	6.68	

=== Final ===
Rank	Name	Nationality	Time	Notes
1st place, gold medalist(s)	Marian Woronin	Poland	6.51	CR, AR
2nd place, silver medalist(s)	Pierfrancesco Pavoni	Italy	6.58	NR
3rd place, bronze medalist(s)	František Ptáčník	Czechoslovakia	6.61	
3rd place, bronze medalist(s)	Antonio Ullo	Italy	6.61	
5	Valentin Atanasov	Bulgaria	6.62	
6	Antoine Richard	France	6.63	
