= Athletics at the Friendship Games – Men's 100 metres =

The men's 100 metres event at the Friendship Games was held on 17 August 1984 at the Grand Arena of the Central Lenin Stadium in Moscow, Soviet Union.

== Medalists ==
Gold	Silver	Bronze
Osvaldo Lara; Cuba	Attila Kovács; Hungary	Leandro Peñalver; Cuba

== Results ==
=== Heats ===
Rank	Name	Nationality	Time	Notes
	Nikolay Sidorov	Soviet Union	10.33	Q
9	Boris Nikulin	Soviet Union	10.40	
10	Steffen Bringmann	East Germany	10.43	
11	František Břečka	Czechoslovakia	10.44	
12	Valentin Atanasov	Bulgaria	10.44	
13	Nikolay Yushmanov	Soviet Union	10.48	
14	István Tatár	Hungary	10.61	
15	Nikolay Markov	Bulgaria	10.63	
16	Marian Woronin	Poland	10.66	
17	Ferenc Kiss	Hungary	??.??	
18	Josef Lomnický	Czechoslovakia	10.76	
19	Marco Mautino	Peru	10.76	
20	Leszek Dunecki	Poland	10.79	
21	Nguyen Truong Hoa	Vietnam	10.79	
22	Krasimir Sarbakov	Bulgaria	10.82	
23	The Cheu	Vietnam	10.83	
24	A. Raweluson	Malaysia	10.90	
25	O. Andramachaj	Malaysia	10.90	
26	Mamoudou Bangura	Guinea	10.96	
27	Giorgio Mautino	Peru	11.01	
28	Humberto Newball	Nicaragua	11.03	
29	H. Rose	Seychelles	11.10	
30	Patrice Mahoulikponto	Benin	11.27	
31	Fadi Mikaelian	Lebanon	11.47	
32	Jihad Salame	Lebanon	11.49	
33	Kimara Nauvana	Guinea-Bissau	11.64	
34	T. Puthia	Cambodia	11.69	
35	K. Wimen	Cambodia	11.81	
36	P. Sophal	Cambodia	11.84	
37	H. Maama	Guinea	11.86	
38	G. Matala	Guinea	12.83	

=== Final ===
Wind: -0.4 m/s

Rank	Name	Nationality	Time	Notes
1st place, gold medalist(s)	Osvaldo Lara	Cuba	10.17	
2nd place, silver medalist(s)	Attila Kovács	Hungary	10.18	
3rd place, bronze medalist(s)	Leandro Peñalver	Cuba	10.21	
4	Arkadiusz Janiak	Poland	10.29	PB
5	Thomas Schröder	East Germany	10.33	
6	Nikolay Sidorov	Soviet Union	10.35	
7	František Ptáčník	Czechoslovakia	10.35	
8	Andrés Simón	Cuba	10.36	

== See also ==
- Athletics at the 1984 Summer Olympics – Men's 100 metres
