= 1984 European Athletics Indoor Championships – Men's 60 metres =

The men's 60 metres event at the 1984 European Athletics Indoor Championships was held on 3 March.

== Medalists ==
Gold	Silver	Bronze
Christian Haas; West Germany	Antonio Ullo; Italy	Ronald Desruelles; Belgium

== Results ==
=== Heats ===
First 3 from each heat (Q) and the next 2 fastest (q) qualified for the final.

Rank	Heat	Name	Nationality	Time	Notes
1	1	Christian Haas	West Germany	6.67	Q
2	2	Ronald Desruelles	Belgium	6.69	Q
3	2	José Javier Arqués	Spain	6.70	Q
4	1	Jean-Jacques Boussemart	France	6.74	Q
4	2	Antonio Ullo	Italy	6.74	Q
6	1	Josef Lomický	Czechoslovakia	6.75	Q
7	2	Antoine Richard	France	6.78	q
8	1	Bruno Marie-Rose	France	6.81	q
9	2	Jouko Hassi	Finland	6.82	
10	1	Valentin Atanasov	Bulgaria	6.85	
11	2	Kenth Rönn	Sweden	6.89	
12	2	Tommy Johansson	Sweden	6.91	
13	1	Odd Erik Kristiansen	Norway	6.97	
14	1	Per-Ola Olsson	Sweden	7.00	

=== Final ===
Rank	Lane	Name	Nationality	Time	Notes
1st place, gold medalist(s)	8	Christian Haas	West Germany	6.68	
2nd place, silver medalist(s)	2	Antonio Ullo	Italy	6.68	
3rd place, bronze medalist(s)	4	Ronald Desruelles	Belgium	6.69	
4	1	Antoine Richard	France	6.70	
5	7	José Javier Arqués	Spain	6.72	
6	5	Bruno Marie-Rose	France	6.73	
7	3	Jean-Jacques Boussemart	France	6.73	
8	6	Josef Lomický	Czechoslovakia	6.77	
