= 1986 European Athletics Championships – Men's 100 metres =

Men's 100 metres at the 1986 European Athletics Championships
- Venue: Neckarstadion
- Location: Stuttgart
- Dates: 26 August (heats); 27 August (semifinals & final)
- Competitors: 33 from 18 nations
- Winning time: 10.15

Medalists
gold medal	Linford Christie	Great Britain
silver medal	Steffen Bringmann	East Germany
bronze medal	Bruno Marie-Rose	France

These are the official results of the Men's 100 metres event at the 1986 European Championships in Stuttgart, West Germany, held at Neckarstadion on 26 and 27 August 1986.

== Participation ==
According to an unofficial count, 33 athletes from 18 countries participated in the event.

- Austria (2)
- Belgium (1)
- Denmark (2)
- East Germany (2)
- France (3)
- Greece (1)
- Hungary (2)
- Ireland (1)
- Italy (1)
- Liechtenstein (1)
- Malta (1)
- Norway (2)
- Poland (1)
- Portugal (3)
- Soviet Union (3)
- Spain (1)
- United Kingdom (3)
- West Germany (3)

== Results ==
=== Heats ===
26 August

==== Heat 1 ====
Rank	Name	Nationality	Time	Notes
1	Allan Wells	United Kingdom	10.31	Q
2	Antoine Richard	France	10.38	Q
3	Christian Haas	West Germany	10.38	Q
4	Vladimir Muravyov	Soviet Union	10.39	q
5	Einar Sagli	Norway	10.65	
6	Luís Cunha	Portugal	10.74	
7	Aris Cefai	Malta	11.56	
			Wind: -1.5 m/s	

==== Heat 2 ====
Rank	Name	Nationality	Time	Notes
1	Steffen Bringmann	East Germany	10.34	Q
2	Nikolay Yushmanov	Soviet Union	10.38	Q
3	Andreas Berger	Austria	10.50	Q
4	Antonio Ullo	Italy	10.54	
5	István Tatár	Hungary	10.60	
6	Pedro Agostinho	Portugal	10.75	
			Wind: -0.7 m/s	

==== Heat 3 ====
Rank	Name	Nationality	Time	Notes
1	Attila Kovács	Hungary	10.32	Q
2	Thomas Schröder	East Germany	10.33	Q
3	Jürgen Evers	West Germany	10.36	Q
4	Gilles Quénéhervé	France	10.56	
5	Lars Pedersen	Denmark	10.85	
	Marian Woronin	Poland	DNF	
			Wind: -0.8 m/s	

==== Heat 4 ====
Rank	Name	Nationality	Time	Notes
1	Viktor Bryzgin	Soviet Union	10.35	Q
2	José Javier Arqués	Spain	10.44	Q
3	Mike McFarlane	United Kingdom	10.48	Q
4	Matthias Schlicht	West Germany	10.56	
5	Christian Mark	Austria	10.66	
6	Odd-Erik Kristiansen	Norway	10.80	
7	Phil Snoddy	Ireland	10.88	
			Wind: -1.6 m/s	

==== Heat 5 ====
Rank	Name	Nationality	Time	Notes
1	Linford Christie	United Kingdom	10.25	Q
2	Bruno Marie-Rose	France	10.29	Q
3	Ronald Desruelles	Belgium	10.41	Q
4	Kosmas Stratos	Greece	10.57	
5	Arnaldo Abrantes	Portugal	10.61	
6	Morten Kjems	Denmark	10.78	
7	Markus Büchel	Liechtenstein	11.03	
			Wind: -1.0 m/s	

=== Semifinals ===
27 August

==== Heat 1 ====
Rank	Name	Nationality	Time	Notes
1	Steffen Bringmann	East Germany	10.16	Q
2	Bruno Marie-Rose	France	10.18	Q
3	Allan Wells	United Kingdom	10.22	Q
4	Viktor Bryzgin	Soviet Union	10.23	Q
5	Christian Haas	West Germany	10.27	
6	Vladimir Muravyov	Soviet Union	10.31	
7	Ronald Desruelles	Belgium	10.43	
8	Andreas Berger	Austria	10.45	
			Wind: +1.5 m/s	

==== Heat 2 ====
Rank	Name	Nationality	Time	Notes
1	Linford Christie	United Kingdom	10.19	Q
2	Attila Kovács	Hungary	10.26	Q
3	Thomas Schröder	East Germany	10.28	Q
4	Antoine Richard	France	10.29	Q
5	Mike McFarlane	United Kingdom	10.29	Q
6	Jürgen Evers	West Germany	10.33	
7	Nikolay Yushmanov	Soviet Union	10.49	
8	José Javier Arqués	Spain	10.54	
			Wind: +2.1 m/s	

=== Final ===
27 August

Rank	Name	Nationality	Time	Notes
1st place, gold medalist(s)	Linford Christie	United Kingdom	10.15	
2nd place, silver medalist(s)	Steffen Bringmann	East Germany	10.20	
3rd place, bronze medalist(s)	Bruno Marie-Rose	France	10.21	
4	Thomas Schröder	East Germany	10.24	
5	Allan Wells	United Kingdom	10.25	
6	Mike McFarlane	United Kingdom	10.29	
7	Attila Kovács	Hungary	10.31	
8	Antoine Richard	France	10.34	
9	Viktor Bryzgin	Soviet Union	10.38	
			Wind: -0.1 m/s	

== See also ==
- 1984 Men's Olympic 100 metres (Los Angeles)
- 1987 Men's World Championships 100 metres (Rome)
- 1988 Men's Olympic 100 metres (Seoul)
