= 1986 European Athletics Indoor Championships – Men's 60 metres =

The men's 60 metres event at the 1986 European Athletics Indoor Championships was held on 22 and 23 February.

== Medalists ==
Gold	Silver	Bronze
Ronald Desruelles; Belgium	Steffen Bringmann; East Germany	Bruno Marie-Rose; France

== Results ==
=== Heats ===
First 2 from each heat (Q) and the next 4 fastest (q) qualified for the semifinals.

Rank	Heat	Name	Nationality	Time	Notes
1	1	Steffen Bringmann	East Germany	6.64	Q
1	2	Frank Emmelmann	East Germany	6.64	Q
1	4	Ronald Desruelles	Belgium	6.64	Q
4	2	Christian Mark	Austria	6.67	Q
4	4	Antonio Ullo	Italy	6.67	Q
6	2	Antoine Richard	France	6.68	q
6	3	José Javier Arqués	Spain	6.68	Q
6	4	Stefan Burkart	Switzerland	6.68	q
9	3	Andreas Berger	Austria	6.69	Q
10	3	Andreas Knötgen	West Germany	6.69	q
11	3	Volker Schulz	East Germany	6.69	q
12	1	Bruno Marie-Rose	France	6.70	Q
13	1	István Tatár	Hungary	6.74	
14	1	Florencio Gascón	Spain	6.76	
15	2	Dušan Sukup	Czechoslovakia	6.78	
16	2	Anri Grigorov	Bulgaria	6.79	
17	4	Krzysztof Zwoliński	Poland	6.81	
18	4	Valentín Rocandio	Spain	6.88	
19	3	Luís Cunha	Portugal	6.92	
20	1	Angelos Angelidis	Cyprus	6.96	

=== Semifinals ===
First 3 from each semifinal qualified directly (Q) for the final.

Rank	Heat	Name	Nationality	Time	Notes
1	2	Ronald Desruelles	Belgium	6.57	Q
2	1	Steffen Bringmann	East Germany	6.62	Q
2	2	Andreas Berger	Austria	6.62	Q
4	2	Frank Emmelmann	East Germany	6.63	Q
5	2	Antoine Richard	France	6.64	
6	1	José Javier Arqués	Spain	6.65	Q
7	1	Bruno Marie-Rose	France	6.65	Q
8	1	Antonio Ullo	Italy	6.65	
9	1	Christian Mark	Austria	6.66	
10	1	Volker Schulz	East Germany	6.68	
11	2	Stefan Burkart	Switzerland	6.70	
	2	Andreas Knötgen	West Germany	DNS	

=== Final ===
Rank	Lane	Name	Nationality	Time	Notes
1st place, gold medalist(s)	4	Ronald Desruelles	Belgium	6.61	
2nd place, silver medalist(s)	5	Steffen Bringmann	East Germany	6.64	
3rd place, bronze medalist(s)	1	Bruno Marie-Rose	France	6.65	
4	3	Frank Emmelmann	East Germany	6.66	
5	2	Andreas Berger	Austria	6.70	
6	6	José Javier Arqués	Spain	6.70	
