= Athletics at the Friendship Games – Men's 4 × 100 metres relay =

The men's 4 × 100 metres relay event at the Friendship Games was held on 17 August 1984 at the Grand Arena of the Central Lenin Stadium in Moscow, Soviet Union.

== Results ==
Rank	Nation	Competitors	Time	Notes
1st place, gold medalist(s)	Soviet Union	Aleksandr Yevgenyev, Sergey Sokolov, Vladimir Muravyov, Nikolay Sidorov	38.32	
2nd place, silver medalist(s)	Cuba	Tomás González, Leandro Peñalver, Silvio Leonard, Osvaldo Lara	38.79	
3rd place, bronze medalist(s)	Poland	Krzysztof Zwoliński, Marian Woronin, Czesław Prądzyński, Arkadiusz Janiak	38.81	
4	Czechoslovakia	Josef Lomický, František Ptáčník, Miroslav Púchovský, František Břečka	39.14	
5	Hungary	Ferenc Kiss, Endre Havas, István Tatár, Attila Kovács	39.21	
6	Bulgaria	Krasimir Sarbakov, Valentin Atanasov, Bogomil Karadimov, Nikolay Markov	39.44	
7	South Yemen	G. Hassuna, N. Salim, A. Zakir, S. Ali	44.48	

== See also ==
- Athletics at the 1984 Summer Olympics – Men's 4 × 100 metres relay
