= 1985 European Athletics Indoor Championships – Men's 60 metres =

The men's 60 metres event at the 1985 European Athletics Indoor Championships was held on 2 March.

== Medalists ==
Gold	Silver	Bronze
Mike McFarlane; Great Britain	Antoine Richard; France	Ronald Desruelles; Belgium

== Results ==
=== Heats ===
First 2 from each heat (Q) and the next 2 fastest (q) qualified for the semifinals.

Rank	Heat	Name	Nationality	Time	Notes
1	5	Ronald Desruelles	Belgium	6.65	Q
2	3	Antoine Richard	France	6.69	Q
3	1	Mike McFarlane	Great Britain	6.70	Q
3	2	František Ptáčník	Czechoslovakia	6.70	Q
3	2	Attila Kovács	Hungary	6.70	Q
3	3	Steffen Bringmann	East Germany	6.70	Q
7	2	Antonio Ullo	Italy	6.71	q
8	4	Pierfrancesco Pavoni	Italy	6.72	Q
8	5	Arkadiusz Janiak	Poland	6.72	Q
10	4	José Javier Arqués	Spain	6.73	Q
11	4	Christian Haas	West Germany	6.73	q
12	1	Hans Fritzsche	West Germany	6.76	Q
12	1	Josef Lomický	Czechoslovakia	6.76	
12	3	Lincoln Asquith	Great Britain	6.76	
12	4	Bruno Marie-Rose	France	6.76	
16	1	Aleksandr Shumilov	Soviet Union	6.77	
16	5	Anri Grigorov	Bulgaria	6.77	
18	5	Stefan Burkart	Switzerland	6.78	
19	4	Kosmas Stratos	Greece	6.83	
20	5	Roland Jokl	Austria	6.93	
21	2	Pedro Agostinho	Portugal	6.96	
22	1	Angelos Angelidis	Cyprus	6.97	
23	2	Tore Bergan	Norway	7.02	
24	3	Luís Cunha	Portugal	7.08	
	3	Sotirios Tefas	Greece	DNS	

=== Semifinals ===
First 3 from each semifinal qualified directly (Q) for the final.

Rank	Heat	Name	Nationality	Time	Notes
1	1	Ronald Desruelles	Belgium	6.62	Q
1	2	Antonio Ullo	Italy	6.62	Q
3	1	Mike McFarlane	Great Britain	6.63	Q
4	2	Antoine Richard	France	6.64	Q
5	2	František Ptáčník	Czechoslovakia	6.64	Q
6	2	Steffen Bringmann	East Germany	6.65	
7	1	Attila Kovács	Hungary	6.67	Q
8	1	Christian Haas	West Germany	6.68	
9	1	Arkadiusz Janiak	Poland	6.70	
10	1	Pierfrancesco Pavoni	Italy	6.73	
11	2	Hans Fritzsche	West Germany	6.79	
	2	José Javier Arqués	Spain	DNS	

=== Final ===
Rank	Lane	Name	Nationality	Time	Notes
1st place, gold medalist(s)	2	Mike McFarlane	Great Britain	6.61	
2nd place, silver medalist(s)	5	Antoine Richard	France	6.63	
3rd place, bronze medalist(s)	3	Ronald Desruelles	Belgium	6.64	
4	4	Antonio Ullo	Italy	6.66	
5	6	Attila Kovács	Hungary	6.69	
6	1	František Ptáčník	Czechoslovakia	6.71	
