= 1987 IAAF World Indoor Championships – Men's 60 metres =

The men's 60 metres event at the 1987 IAAF World Indoor Championships was held at the Hoosier Dome in Indianapolis on 6 and 7 March.

== Medalists ==
Gold	Silver	Bronze
Lee McRae; United States	Mark Witherspoon; United States	Pierfrancesco Pavoni; Italy

Note: Ben Johnson of Canada originally won the gold medal in a world record time of 6.41, but he was disqualified in September 1989 after he admitted to steroid use between 1981 and 1988.

== Results ==
=== Heats ===
The first 2 of each heat (Q) and next 4 fastest (q) qualified for the semifinals.

Rank	Heat	Name	Nationality	Time	Notes
~~1~~	1	Ben Johnson	Canada	~~6.60~~	DQ
1	5	Ronald Desruelles	Belgium	6.64	Q
1	6	Pierfrancesco Pavoni	Italy	6.64	Q
3	2	Lee McRae	United States	6.66	Q
3	3	Mark Witherspoon	United States	6.66	Q
3	4	Christian Haas	West Germany	6.66	Q
6	4	Bruno Marie-Rose	France	6.67	Q
7	6	Valentin Atanasov	Bulgaria	6.68	Q
8	3	Andrés Simón	Cuba	6.69	Q
8	6	William Trott	Bermuda	6.69	q. NR
10	5	Li Tao	China	6.70	Q, NR
10	5	Antonio Ullo	Italy	6.70	q
12	2	Antoine Richard	France	6.71	Q
13	5	Elliot Bunney	Great Britain	6.72	q
14	2	Rohan Wade	Jamaica	6.73	q, NR
15	3	Charles-Louis Seck	Senegal	6.74	
16	5	José Javier Arqués	Spain	6.75	
17	1	Attila Kovács	Hungary	6.76	Q
17	4	Mike McFarlane	Great Britain	6.76	
19	2	Rick Jones	Canada	6.77	
20	2	Ricardo Chacón	Cuba	6.79	
21	4	Neville Hodge	United States Virgin Islands	6.83	NR
22	4	Dazel Jules	Trinidad and Tobago	6.84	
23	5	Greg Barnes	United States Virgin Islands	6.85	
24	3	Gregory Meghoo	Jamaica	6.88	
25	1	John Albertie	Saint Lucia	6.91	
26	2	Esteban Carpio	Dominican Republic	6.92	
27	3	Lars Hummel	Denmark	6.97	
28	4	Earl Hazel	Saint Kitts and Nevis	6.99	NR
29	3	Julien Thode	Netherlands Antilles	7.00	
30	6	Orde Ballantyne	Saint Vincent and the Grenadines	7.05	NR
31	5	Sumet Promna	Thailand	7.07	NR
32	1	Cyril Brioche	Seychelles	7.11	NR
33	2	Simon Kipkemboi	Kenya	7.12	NR
34	4	Ziad Hanna	Lebanon	7.14	NR
35	6	Clifford Mamba	Swaziland	7.21	NR
36	6	Trevor Davis	Anguilla	7.21	NR
37	3	Sunday Olweny	Uganda	7.22	NR
38	3	Carl Chicksen	Zimbabwe	7.23	NR
39	5	Rodney Cox	Turks and Caicos Islands	7.27	NR
40	1	William George	Liberia	7.38	NR
	1	Victor Edet	Nigeria	DNS	
	1	Leandro Peñalver	Cuba	DNS	
	1	Mustapha Kamel Selmi	Algeria	DNS	
	2	Fabian Whymns	Bahamas	DNS	
	4	Chidi Imoh	Nigeria	DNS	
	6	Robson da Silva	Brazil	DNS	
	6	Otokpa Kouadio	Ivory Coast	DNS	

=== Semifinals ===
First 4 of each semifinal (Q) qualified directly for the final.

Rank	Heat	Name	Nationality	Time	Notes
~~1~~	1	Ben Johnson	Canada	~~6.49~~	DQ
1	1	Lee McRae	United States	6.58	Q, PB
2	2	Mark Witherspoon	United States	6.60	Q
3	1	Antonio Ullo	Italy	6.65	Q
4	2	Pierfrancesco Pavoni	Italy	6.66	Q
5	2	Bruno Marie-Rose	France	6.66	Q
6	2	Ronald Desruelles	Belgium	6.67	Q
7	1	Christian Haas	West Germany	6.67	Q
8	1	Valentin Atanasov	Bulgaria	6.67	
9	1	Antoine Richard	France	6.69	
10	2	Li Tao	China	6.70	=NR
11	2	William Trott	Bermuda	6.71	
12	1	Andrés Simón	Cuba	6.72	
13	2	Elliot Bunney	Great Britain	6.74	
14	2	Rohan Wade	Jamaica	6.81	
15	1	Attila Kovács	Hungary	6.83	

=== Final ===
Rank	Lane	Name	Nationality	Time	Notes
1st place, gold medalist(s)	6	Lee McRae	United States	6.50	WR, CR
2nd place, silver medalist(s)	4	Mark Witherspoon	United States	6.54	PB
3rd place, bronze medalist(s)	5	Pierfrancesco Pavoni	Italy	6.59	
4	2	Antonio Ullo	Italy	6.64	
5	8	Ronald Desruelles	Belgium	6.67	
6	7	Bruno Marie-Rose	France	6.68	
6	1	Christian Haas	West Germany	6.68	
DSQ	3	Ben Johnson	Canada	6.41	
