= 1983 European Athletics Indoor Championships – Men's 200 metres =

The men's 200 metres event at the 1983 European Athletics Indoor Championships was held on 6 March.

== Medalists ==
Gold	Silver	Bronze
Aleksandr Yevgenyev; Soviet Union	Jacques Borlée; Belgium	István Nagy; Hungary

== Results ==
=== Heats ===
First 2 from each heat (Q) and the next 2 fastest (q) qualified for the semifinals.

Rank	Heat	Name	Nationality	Time	Notes
1	1	István Nagy	Hungary	21.25	Q
2	3	Roland Jokl	Austria	21.27	Q
3	2	Aleksandr Yevgenyev	Soviet Union	21.28	Q
4	1	Jacques Borlée	Belgium	21.29	Q
5	3	László Babály	Hungary	21.30	Q
6	3	Viktor Bryzgin	Soviet Union	21.31	q
7	4	Ferenc Kiss	Hungary	21.34	Q
8	4	Czesław Prądzyński	Poland	21.42	Q
9	1	Aldo Canti	France	21.50	q
10	2	Peter Klein	West Germany	21.54	Q
11	2	Earl Tulloch	Great Britain	21.78	
12	4	Jouko Lehtinen	Finland	21.87	
13	2	Tommy Johansson	Sweden	22.15	
14	4	Per-Ola Olsson	Sweden	22.28	
15	1	Şükrü Çaprazlı	Turkey	22.52	
	3	Kenth Rönn	Sweden	DNS	

=== Semifinals ===
First 2 from each semifinal (Q) and next 1 fastest (q) qualified for the final.

Rank	Heat	Name	Nationality	Time	Notes
1	2	Aleksandr Yevgenyev	Soviet Union	20.93	Q, CR
2	1	István Nagy	Hungary	20.94	Q
3	2	Ferenc Kiss	Hungary	21.04	Q
4	1	Jacques Borlée	Belgium	21.10	Q
5	2	Peter Klein	West Germany	21.22	q
6	1	Czesław Prądzyński	Poland	21.25	
7	2	László Babály	Hungary	21.32	
8	2	Roland Jokl	Austria	21.40	
9	1	Aldo Canti	France	21.58	
	1	Viktor Bryzgin	Soviet Union	DQ	

=== Final ===
Rank	Name	Nationality	Time	Notes
1st place, gold medalist(s)	Aleksandr Yevgenyev	Soviet Union	20.97	
2nd place, silver medalist(s)	Jacques Borlée	Belgium	21.13	
3rd place, bronze medalist(s)	István Nagy	Hungary	21.18	
4	Peter Klein	West Germany	21.41	
5	Ferenc Kiss	Hungary	21.57	
