= 1986 European Athletics Indoor Championships – Men's 200 metres =

The men's 200 metres event at the 1986 European Athletics Indoor Championships was held on 22 and 23 February.

== Medalists ==
| Gold | Silver | Bronze |
|---|---|---|
| Linford Christie; Great Britain | Aleksandr Yevgenyev; Soviet Union | Nikolay Razgonov; Soviet Union |

== Results ==
=== Heats ===
The winner of each heat (Q) and the next 3 fastest (q) qualified for the semifinals.

| Rank | Heat | Name | Nationality | Time | Notes |
|---|---|---|---|---|---|
| 1 | 1 | Aleksandr Yevgenyev | Soviet Union | 21.23 | Q |
| 2 | 5 | Nikolay Razgonov | Soviet Union | 21.26 | Q |
| 3 | 1 | Linford Christie | Great Britain | 21.42 | q |
| 4 | 1 | Daniel Sangouma | France | 21.42 | q |
| 5 | 3 | Norbert Dobeleit | West Germany | 21.78 | Q |
| 5 | 5 | Juha Pyy | Finland | 21.78 | q |
| 7 | 2 | Ronald Desruelles | Belgium | 21.83 | Q |
| 8 | 4 | Juan Prado | Spain | 21.87 | Q |
| 9 | 2 | Jacek Licznerski | Poland | 21.90 | |
| 9 | 5 | Krzysztof Zwoliński | Poland | 21.90 | |
| 11 | 4 | Roland Jokl | Austria | 21.92 | |
| 12 | 4 | Anri Grigorov | Bulgaria | 22.01 | |
| 13 | 1 | Luís Cunha | Portugal | 22.02 | |
| 14 | 3 | Carlos Turró | Spain | 22.05 | |
| 15 | 3 | Lars Pedersen | Denmark | 22.08 | |
| 16 | 4 | Marco De Pasquale | Italy | 22.42 | |
| 16 | 2 | Angelos Angelidis | Cyprus | 22.51 | |
| 17 | 3 | Yann Quentrec | France | 23.09 | PB |
| | 2 | Ade Mafe | Great Britain | DNF | |
| | 5 | Andreas Berger | Austria | DNF | |

=== Semifinals ===
First 2 from each semifinal qualified directly (Q) for the final.

| Rank | Heat | Name | Nationality | Time | Notes |
|---|---|---|---|---|---|
| 1 | 1 | Aleksandr Yevgenyev | Soviet Union | 21.17 | Q |
| 2 | 2 | Nikolay Razgonov | Soviet Union | 21.29 | Q |
| 3 | 2 | Linford Christie | Great Britain | 21.33 | Q |
| 4 | 1 | Daniel Sangouma | France | 21.47 | Q |
| 5 | 1 | Norbert Dobeleit | West Germany | 21.60 | |
| 6 | 2 | Ronald Desruelles | Belgium | 22.04 | |
| 7 | 2 | Juha Pyy | Finland | 22.57 | |
| 8 | 1 | Juan Prado | Spain | 22.70 | |

=== Final ===
| Rank | Lane | Name | Nationality | Time | Notes |
|---|---|---|---|---|---|
| 1st place, gold medalist(s) | 4 | Linford Christie | Great Britain | 21.10 | |
| 2nd place, silver medalist(s) | 3 | Aleksandr Yevgenyev | Soviet Union | 21.18 | |
| 3rd place, bronze medalist(s) | 2 | Nikolay Razgonov | Soviet Union | 21.48 | |
| 4 | 1 | Daniel Sangouma | France | 21.78 | |
