= 1988 European Athletics Indoor Championships – Men's 60 metres =

The men's 60 metres event at the 1988 European Athletics Indoor Championships was held on 5 March.

== Medalists ==
Gold	Silver	Bronze
Linford Christie; Great Britain	Ronald Desruelles; Belgium	Valentin Atanasov; Bulgaria

== Results ==
=== Heats ===
First 2 from each heat (Q) and the next 4 fastest (q) qualified for the semifinals.

Rank	Heat	Name	Nationality	Time	Notes
1	1	Sven Matthes	East Germany	6.65	Q
1	2	Ronald Desruelles	Belgium	6.65	Q
1	3	Anri Grigorov	Bulgaria	6.65	Q
4	1	Andreas Berger	Austria	6.67	Q
4	3	Linford Christie	Great Britain	6.67	Q
4	4	Valentin Atanasov	Bulgaria	6.67	Q
4	4	Pierfrancesco Pavoni	Italy	6.67	Q
8	1	Barrington Williams	Great Britain	6.68	q
9	2	Antonio Ullo	Italy	6.69	Q
10	4	László Karaffa	Hungary	6.70	q
11	3	Stephan Schütz	East Germany	6.76	q
12	1	José Javier Arqués	Spain	6.77	q
13	2	Jiří Valík	Czechoslovakia	6.78	
14	3	Endre Havas	Hungary	6.84	
15	2	Daniel Darien	France	6.85	
16	1	Fritz Heer	West Germany	6.87	
17	2	Sandor Tóth	Hungary	6.91	
18	4	Luís Cunha	Portugal	7.00	

=== Semifinals ===
First 3 from each semifinal qualified directly (Q) for the final.

Rank	Heat	Name	Nationality	Time	Notes
1	2	Linford Christie	Great Britain	6.55	Q
2	2	Sven Matthes	East Germany	6.60	Q
3	1	Ronald Desruelles	Belgium	6.61	Q
4	1	Valentin Atanasov	Bulgaria	6.61	Q
5	1	Pierfrancesco Pavoni	Italy	6.62	Q
5	2	Antonio Ullo	Italy	6.62	Q
5	2	Andreas Berger	Austria	6.62	
5	2	Anri Grigorov	Bulgaria	6.62	
9	1	Barrington Williams	Great Britain	6.68	
10	1	László Karaffa	Hungary	6.68	
11	2	José Javier Arqués	Spain	6.70	
12	1	Stephan Schütz	East Germany	6.71	

=== Final ===
Rank	Lane	Name	Nationality	Time	Notes
1st place, gold medalist(s)	5	Linford Christie	Great Britain	6.57	
2nd place, silver medalist(s)	2	Ronald Desruelles	Belgium	6.60	
3rd place, bronze medalist(s)	3	Valentin Atanasov	Bulgaria	6.60	
4	4	Sven Matthes	East Germany	6.60	
5	6	Pierfrancesco Pavoni	Italy	6.64	
6	1	Antonio Ullo	Italy	6.67	
