= 1982 European Athletics Indoor Championships – Men's 60 metres =

The men's 60 metres event at the 1982 European Athletics Indoor Championships was held on 6 March.

== Medalists ==
Gold	Silver	Bronze
Marian Woronin; Poland	Valentin Atanasov; Bulgaria	Bernard Petitbois; France

== Results ==
=== Heats ===
First 2 from each heat (Q) and the next 4 fastest (q) qualified for the semifinals.

Rank	Heat	Name	Nationality	Time	Notes
1	2	Valentin Atanasov	Bulgaria	6.65	Q
2	3	Bernard Petitbois	France	6.67	Q
3	2	Marian Woronin	Poland	6.68	Q
4	2	José Javier Arqués	Spain	6.70	q, NR
5	3	Harry King	Great Britain	6.71	Q
5	4	Giovanni Grazioli	Italy	6.71	Q
5	4	Josep Carbonell	Spain	6.71	Q
8	1	Christian Haas	West Germany	6.73	Q
8	3	Ingo Froböse	West Germany	6.73	q
10	1	Pierfrancesco Pavoni	Italy	6.74	Q
11	3	Aleksandr Yevgenyev	Soviet Union	6.75	q
12	4	Antoine Richard	France	6.76	q
13	1	Ronald Desruelles	Belgium	6.76	
14	1	Aleksandr Aksinin	Soviet Union	6.80	
15	4	Franco Fähndrich	Switzerland	6.81	
16	2	Gianfranco Lazzer	Italy	6.83	
16	3	László Babály	Hungary	6.83	
18	1	Roland Jokl	Austria	6.86	
18	2	Josef Lomický	Czechoslovakia	6.86	

=== Semifinals ===
First 3 from each semifinal qualified directly (Q) for the final.

Rank	Heat	Name	Nationality	Time	Notes
1	2	Bernard Petitbois	France	6.63	Q
2	1	Valentin Atanasov	Bulgaria	6.64	Q
3	1	José Javier Arqués	Spain	6.66	Q, NR
4	2	Marian Woronin	Poland	6.68	Q
5	2	Pierfrancesco Pavoni	Italy	6.69	Q
6	2	Josep Carbonell	Spain	6.69	
7	1	Christian Haas	West Germany	6.71	Q
8	2	Ingo Froböse	West Germany	6.72	
9	2	Harry King	Great Britain	6.72	
10	1	Aleksandr Yevgenyev	Soviet Union	6.73	
11	1	Antoine Richard	France	6.73	
12	1	Giovanni Grazioli	Italy	6.74	

=== Final ===
Rank	Lane	Name	Nationality	Time	Notes
1st place, gold medalist(s)	3	Marian Woronin	Poland	6.61	
2nd place, silver medalist(s)	1	Valentin Atanasov	Bulgaria	6.62	
3rd place, bronze medalist(s)	5	Bernard Petitbois	France	6.66	
4	6	Pierfrancesco Pavoni	Italy	6.68	
5	2	Christian Haas	West Germany	6.69	
6	4	José Javier Arqués	Spain	6.71	
