= 1987 European Athletics Indoor Championships – Men's 200 metres =

The men's 200 metres event at the 1987 European Athletics Indoor Championships was held on 21 and 22 February.

== Medalists ==
Gold	Silver	Bronze
Bruno Marie-Rose; France	Vladimir Krylov; Soviet Union	John Regis; Great Britain

== Results ==
=== Heats ===
First 2 from each heat (Q) and the next 6 fastest (q) qualified for the semifinals.

Rank	Heat	Name	Nationality	Time	Notes
1	3	Vladimir Krylov	Soviet Union	20.73	Q, CR, NR
2	2	John Regis	Great Britain	20.78	Q, NR
3	1	Bruno Marie-Rose	France	20.80	Q
4	2	Nikolay Razgonov	Soviet Union	20.82	Q
5	3	Gilles Quénéhervé	France	20.86	Q
6	1	Erwin Skamrahl	West Germany	20.90	Q
7	3	Donovan Reid	Great Britain	20.95	q
8	2	Pascal Barré	France	21.00	q
9	1	Ronald Desruelles	Belgium	21.32	q
10	1	Paolo Catalano	Italy	21.41	q
11	3	Antonio Sánchez	Spain	21.63	q
12	2	Norbert Dobeleit	West Germany	21.75	q
13	2	István Nagy	Hungary	21.82	
14	1	Luís Cunha	Portugal	21.83	
15	3	Tommy Björnquist	Sweden	22.01	
	1	Linford Christie	Great Britain	DNF	
	2	Stefano Tilli	Italy	DNF	

=== Semifinals ===
First 3 from each semifinal qualified directly (Q) for the final.

Rank	Heat	Name	Nationality	Time	Notes
1	2	Vladimir Krylov	Soviet Union	20.61	Q, CR, NR
2	1	Gilles Quénéhervé	France	20.81	Q
3	1	John Regis	Great Britain	20.84	Q
4	2	Bruno Marie-Rose	France	20.88	Q
5	2	Erwin Skamrahl	West Germany	20.93	Q
6	1	Ronald Desruelles	Belgium	21.20	Q
7	2	Donovan Reid	Great Britain	21.32	
8	2	Antonio Sánchez	Spain	21.36	
9	1	Pascal Barré	France	21.39	
10	1	Norbert Dobeleit	West Germany	21.91	
11	2	Paolo Catalano	Italy	21.96	
	1	Nikolay Razgonov	Soviet Union	DNF	

=== Final ===
Rank	Lane	Name	Nationality	Time	Notes
1st place, gold medalist(s)	6	Bruno Marie-Rose	France	20.36	WR
2nd place, silver medalist(s)	4	Vladimir Krylov	Soviet Union	20.53	NR
3rd place, bronze medalist(s)	5	John Regis	Great Britain	20.54	NR
4	3	Gilles Quénéhervé	France	20.83	
5	2	Erwin Skamrahl	West Germany	21.44	
6	1	Ronald Desruelles	Belgium	21.78	
