= Germany at the World Athletics Indoor Championships =

Germany team at athletics event

- WA code: GER
- National federation: DLV
- Website: www.leichtathletik.de
- Medals Ranked 9th: Gold 14 Silver 22 Bronze 21 Total 57

World Athletics Indoor Championships appearances (overview)
- 1991; 1993; 1995; 1997; 1999; 2001; 2003; 2004; 2006; 2008; 2010; 2012; 2014; 2016; 2018; 2022; 2024

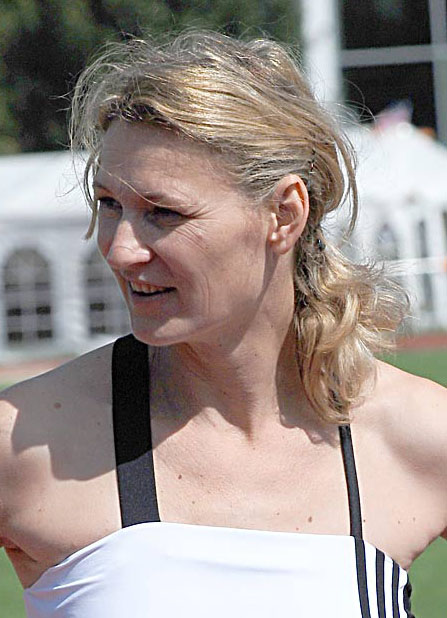
Heike Henkel, four medals won in the high jump. But in Budapest 1989 she represented West Germany.

Germany at the World Athletics Indoor Championships after the Fall of the Berlin Wall, from 1991 edition participated at all editions of the World Athletics Indoor Championships.

== Medal count ==
Edition	1st place, gold medalist(s)	2nd place, silver medalist(s)	3rd place, bronze medalist(s)	Rank
(Spain) Seville 1991	6	1	2	2
(Canada) Toronto 1993	0	3	1	15
(Spain) Barcelona 1995	2	1	4	4
(France) Paris 1997	1	3	1	7
(Japan) Maebashi 1999	3	0	4	4
(Portugal) Lisbon 2001	0	0	2	24
(United Kingdom) Birmingham 2003	1	1	2	8
(Hungary) Budapest 2004	0	0	1	26
(Russia) Moscow 2006	1	1	1	6
(Spain) Valencia 2008	0	0	0	-
(Qatar) Doha 2010	0	2	2	16
(Turkey) Istanbul 2012	0	2	0	15
(Poland) Sopot 2014	0	3	0	18
(United States) Portland 2016	0	2	1	14
(United Kingdom) Birmingham 2018	0	1	2	15
	14	22	21	9

== See also ==
- German Athletics Association
- Germany at the World Athletics Championships
- Germany at the European Athletics Championships
- Germany at the European Athletics Team Championships
