= Athletics in Germany =

Athletics in Germany is governed by Deutscher Leichtathletik-Verband founded on 29 January 1898.

== All-time top lists ==
The lists are updated as of February 22, 2013, and regard to the 21 individual Olympic specialities. For the high jump, the pole vault, the long jump, the triple jump and the shot put, the performances also include the indoor competitions (measures are identified by (i) in the tables).

Performance achieved in the current year

=== 100 metres ===
Men

#	Athlete	Born	Performance	Venue	Date
1	Julian Reus	1988	10.01	(Germany) Mannheim	29 July 2016
2	Frank Emmelmann (East Germany)	1961	10.06	(East Berlin) Berlin (Soviet occupation sector)	22 September 1985
3	Thomas Schröder (East Germany)	1962	10.10	(East Germany) Jena	27 June 1986
4	Sven Matthes (East Germany)	1969	10.11	(East Germany) Rostock	22 June 1989
5	Eugen Ray (East Germany)	1957	10.12	(East Germany) Jena	27 June 1986
6	Marc Blume	1973	10.13	(Germany) Nürnberg	7 June 1996
6	Steffen Bringmann (East Germany)	1964	10.13	(East Germany) Jena	27 June 1986
8	Tobias Unger	1979	10.14	(Germany) Mannheim	3 July 2010
8	Alexander Kosenkow	1977	10.14	(Germany) Leverkusen	3 August 2003
10	Christian Haas	1958	10.16	(Germany) Bremen	24 June 1983

Women

#	Athlete	Born	Performance	Venue	Date
1	Marlies Göhr (East Germany)	1958	10.81	(East Berlin) Berlin (Soviet occupation sector)	8 August 1983
2	Marita Koch (East Germany)	1957	10.83	(East Berlin) Berlin (Soviet occupation sector)	8 August 1983
3	Silke Möller (East Germany)	1964	10.86	(East Germany) Potsdam	20 August 1987
4	Katrin Krabbe (East Germany)	1969	10.89	(East Berlin) Berlin (Soviet occupation sector)	20 July 1988
5	Heike Drechsler (East Germany)	1964	10.91	(Soviet Union) Moscow	6 July 1986
6	Gina Luckenkemper	1996	10.93	(Germany) Berlin	1 September 2024
7	Bärbel Wöckel	1955	10.95	(East Germany) Dresden	1 July 1982
8	Annegret Richter	1950	11.01	(Canada) Montreal	25 July 1976
9	Romy Müller (East Germany)	1958	11.02	(East Germany) Dresden	24 May 1980
10	Monika Hamann (East Germany)	1954	11.03	(East Germany) Dresden	1 July 1977
11	Melanie Paschke	1970	11.04	(Germany) Bremen	30 June 1995
11	Ingrid Auerswald (East Germany)	1957	11.04	(Switzerland) Zürich	22 August 1984
11	Inge Helten	1950	11.04	(Germany) Fürth	13 June 1976

=== 200 metres ===
Men

#	Athlete	Born	Performance	Venue	Date
1	Tobias Unger	1979	20.20	(Germany) Bochum	3 July 2005
2	Frank Emmelmann (East Germany)	1961	20.23	(Soviet Union) Moscow	18 August 1985
3	Aleixo-Platini Menga	1987	20.33	(Germany) Mannheim	9 June 2012
4	Sebastian Ernst	1984	20.37	(Greece) Athens	24 August 2004
4	Eugen Ray (East Germany)	1957	20.37	(East Germany) Dresden	7 August 1977
4	Jürgen Evers	1965	20.37	(Austria) Schwechat	28 August 1983
4	Till Helmke	1984	20.37	(Germany) Wetzlar	28 July 2007
8	Ralf Lübke	1965	20.38	(Germany) Stuttgart	4 August 1985
9	Bernhard Hoff (East Germany)	1959	20.39	(East Germany) Cottbus	18 July 1980
10	Robert Hering	1990	20.41	(Germany) Ulm	5 July 2009

Women

#	Athlete	Born	Performance	Venue	Date
1	Heike Drechsler (East Germany)	1964	21.71	(East Germany) Jena	27 June 1986
1	Marita Koch (East Germany)	1957	21.71	(East Germany) Karl-Marx-Stadt	10 June 1979
3	Marlies Göhr (East Germany)	1958	21.74	(East Germany) Erfurt	3 June 1984
3	Silke Möller (East Germany)	1964	21.74	(Italy) Rome	3 September 1987
5	Bärbel Wöckel (East Germany)	1955	21.85	(East Germany) Potsdam	21 July 1984
6	Katrin Krabbe (East Germany)	1969	21.95	(Socialist Federal Republic of Yugoslavia) Split	30 August 1990
7	Gesine Walther (East Germany)	1962	22.24	(East Germany) Dresden	3 July 1982
8	Andrea Philipp	1971	22.25	(Spain) Sevilla	25 August 1999
9	Silke Knoll	1967	22.29	(Germany) Ingolstadt	19 July 1992
10	Kerstin Behrendt (East Germany)	1967	22.36	(East Germany) Karl-Marx-Stadt	12 June 1988

=== Pole vault ===
Men

#	Athlete	Born	Performance	Venue	Date
1	Björn Otto	1977	6.01 m	(Germany) Aachen	5 September 2012
2	Danny Ecker	1977	6.00 m (i)	(Germany) Dortmund	11 February 2001
2	Tim Lobinger	1972	6.00 m	(Germany) Cologne	24 August 1997
4	Michael Stolle	1974	5.95 m	(Germany) Munich	18 August 2000
4	Andrej Tiwontschik	1970	5.95 m	(Germany) Cologne	16 August 1996
6	Raphael Holzdeppe	1989	5.94 m	(Germany) Nürnberg	26 July 2015
7	Malte Mohr	1986	5.91 m	(Germany) Ingolstadt	22 June 2012
8	Bo Kanda Lita Baehre	1999	5.90 m	(Germany) Berlin	25 June 2022
9	Oleg Zernikel	1995	5.87 m	(United States) Eugene	24 July 2022
10	Torben Blech	1995	5.86 m (i)	(Germany) Düsseldorf	31 January 2021

Women

#	Athlete	Born	Performance	Venue	Date
1	Silke Spiegelburg	1986	4.82 m	(Germany) Munich	20 July 2012
2	Martina Strutz	1981	4.80 m	(South Korea) Daegu	30 August 2011
3	Annika Becker	1981	4.77 m	(Germany) Bochum	7 July 2002
4	Lisa Ryzih	1988	4.75 m (i)	(Serbia) Belgrade	4 March 2017
5	Carolin Hingst	1980	4.72 m	(Germany) Birenbach	9 July 2010
6	Yvonne Buschbaum	1980	4.70 m	(Germany) Ulm	29 June 2003
7	Anna Battke	1980	4.68 m	(Germany) Berlin	14 June 2009
8	Kristina Gadschiew	1984	4.66 m (i)	(Germany) Potsdam	18 February 2011
8	Christine Adams	1974	4.66 m (i)	(Germany) Sindelfingen	10 March 2002
10	Katharina Bauer	1990	4.65 m	(Germany) Beckum	2 August 2015

== See also ==
- Deutscher Leichtathletik-Verband
- German records in athletics
- East Germany national athletics team
