= 1984 European Athletics Indoor Championships – Men's 200 metres =

The men's 200 metres event at the 1984 European Athletics Indoor Championships was held on 3 and 4 March.

== Medalists ==
Gold	Silver	Bronze
Aleksandr Yevgenyev; Soviet Union	Ade Mafe; Great Britain	Giovanni Bongiorni; Italy

== Results ==
=== Heats ===
The winner of each heat (Q) and the next 4 fastest (q) qualified for the semifinals.

Rank	Heat	Name	Nationality	Time	Notes
1	3	Aleksandr Yevgenyev	Soviet Union	21.35	Q
2	2	Ade Mafe	Great Britain	21.63	Q
3	4	Giovanni Bongiorni	Italy	21.64	Q
4	4	Roland Jokl	Austria	21.66	q
5	4	Luboš Balošák	Czechoslovakia	21.68	q
6	2	Stefano Tilli	Italy	21.81	q
7	1	Carlo Simionato	Italy	21.84	Q
8	1	Antonio Sánchez	Spain	21.94	q
9	1	Per-Ola Olsson	Sweden	22.09	
10	2	Jouko Hassi	Finland	22.11	
11	4	Şükrü Çaprazlı	Turkey	22.59	
	1	Athanassios Kaloyannis	Greece	DQ	
	3	Czesław Prądzyński	Poland	DQ	
	3	Odd Erik Kristiansen	Norway	DQ	
	2	Kenth Rönn	Sweden	DNS	
	3	Josef Lomický	Czechoslovakia	DNS	

=== Semifinals ===
First 2 from each semifinal qualified directly (Q) for the final.

Rank	Heat	Name	Nationality	Time	Notes
1	2	Aleksandr Yevgenyev	Soviet Union	21.12	Q
2	1	Ade Mafe	Great Britain	21.36	Q
3	1	Giovanni Bongiorni	Italy	21.46	Q
4	1	Antonio Sánchez	Spain	21.48	
5	1	Carlo Simionato	Italy	21.50	
6	2	Roland Jokl	Austria	21.65	Q
	2	Luboš Balošák	Czechoslovakia	DNF	
	2	Stefano Tilli	Italy	DQ	

=== Final ===
Rank	Name	Nationality	Time	Notes
1st place, gold medalist(s)	Aleksandr Yevgenyev	Soviet Union	20.98	
2nd place, silver medalist(s)	Ade Mafe	Great Britain	21.34	
3rd place, bronze medalist(s)	Giovanni Bongiorni	Italy	21.48	
4	Roland Jokl	Austria	21.78	
