= 1978 European Athletics Indoor Championships – Men's 60 metres =

The men's 60 metres event at the 1978 European Athletics Indoor Championships was held on 11 March in Milan.

== Medalists ==
Gold	Silver	Bronze
Nikolay Kolesnikov; Soviet Union	Petar Petrov; Bulgaria	Aleksandr Aksinin; Soviet Union

== Results ==
=== Heats ===
First 2 from each heat (Q) and the next 4 fastest (q) qualified for the semifinals.

Rank	Heat	Name	Nationality	Time	Notes
1	2	Aleksandr Aksinin	Soviet Union	6.71	Q
2	3	Petar Petrov	Bulgaria	6.72	Q
3	1	Vladimir Ignatenko	Soviet Union	6.74	Q
3	4	Nikolay Kolesnikov	Soviet Union	6.74	Q
5	3	Giovanni Grazioli	Italy	6.75	Q
6	2	Bernard Petitbois	France	6.76	Q
6	4	Massimo Clementoni	Italy	6.76	Q
8	2	Marian Woronin	Poland	6.79	q
9	1	Christer Garpenborg	Sweden	6.83	Q
10	4	Gilles Échevin	France	6.84	q
11	3	Jan Alończyk	Poland	6.85	q
12	2	Ronald Desruelles	Belgium	6.86	q
13	3	Josep Carbonell	Spain	6.88	
14	4	Ángel Ibáñez	Spain	6.89	
15	1	Ján Chebeň	Czechoslovakia	6.91	
16	1	Vincenzo Guerini	Italy	6.91	
17	1	Pierrick Thessard	France	6.95	

=== Semifinals ===
First 3 from each heat (Q) qualified directly for the final.

Rank	Heat	Name	Nationality	Time	Notes
1	2	Petar Petrov	Bulgaria	6.67	Q
2	1	Nikolay Kolesnikov	Soviet Union	6.69	Q
3	1	Aleksandr Aksinin	Soviet Union	6.70	Q
4	1	Marian Woronin	Poland	6.71	Q
5	2	Giovanni Grazioli	Italy	6.74	Q
6	2	Bernard Petitbois	France	6.77	Q
7	1	Massimo Clementoni	Italy	6.78	
7	1	Gilles Échevin	France	6.78	
7	2	Christer Garpenborg	Sweden	6.78	
10	2	Vladimir Ignatenko	Soviet Union	6.79	
11	1	Ronald Desruelles	Belgium	6.80	
12	2	Jan Alończyk	Poland	6.81	

=== Final ===
Rank	Name	Nationality	Time	Notes
1st place, gold medalist(s)	Nikolay Kolesnikov	Soviet Union	6.64	
2nd place, silver medalist(s)	Petar Petrov	Bulgaria	6.66	
3rd place, bronze medalist(s)	Aleksandr Aksinin	Soviet Union	6.73	
4	Marian Woronin	Poland	6.75	
5	Giovanni Grazioli	Italy	6.76	
6	Bernard Petitbois	France	6.84	
