= 1988 European Athletics Indoor Championships – Men's 200 metres =

The men's 200 metres event at the 1988 European Athletics Indoor Championships was held on 5 and 6 March.

== Medalists ==
Gold	Silver	Bronze
Nikolay Razgonov; Soviet Union	Nikolay Antonov; Bulgaria	Linford Christie; Great Britain

== Results ==
=== Heats ===
First 2 from each heat (Q) and the next 4 fastest (q) qualified for the semifinals.

Rank	Heat	Name	Nationality	Time	Notes
1	3	Linford Christie	Great Britain	21.02	Q
2	4	Nikolay Razgonov	Soviet Union	21.03	Q
3	2	Nikolay Antonov	Bulgaria	21.09	Q
4	3	Norbert Dobeleit	West Germany	21.11	Q
5	2	László Karaffa	Hungary	21.22	Q
6	2	Andreas Berger	Austria	21.28	q
6	4	Donovan Reid	Great Britain	21.28	Q
8	4	Tamás Molnár	Hungary	21.29	q
9	3	Jean-Charles Trouabal	France	21.34	q
10	1	Daniel Sangouma	France	21.35	Q
11	4	Sandro Floris	Italy	21.39	q
12	1	Paolo Catalano	Italy	21.56	Q
13	3	Ezio Madonia	Italy	21.57	
14	1	Miguel Ángel Gómez	Spain	21.58	
15	3	Jiří Valík	Czechoslovakia	21.61	
16	2	Björn Sinnhuber	West Germany	21.64	
17	1	Luís Cunha	Portugal	21.67	
18	4	Achmed de Kom	Netherlands	21.75	
19	2	Robert Nilsson	Sweden	21.84	

=== Semifinals ===
First 3 from each semifinal qualified directly (Q) for the final.

Rank	Heat	Name	Nationality	Time	Notes
1	2	Linford Christie	Great Britain	20.79	Q
2	1	Nikolay Razgonov	Soviet Union	20.87	Q
3	1	Nikolay Antonov	Bulgaria	20.87	Q
4	2	Andreas Berger	Austria	21.07	Q
5	2	Norbert Dobeleit	West Germany	21.16	Q
6	1	Daniel Sangouma	France	21.22	Q
7	1	László Karaffa	Hungary	21.24	
7	2	Tamás Molnár	Hungary	21.24	
9	2	Jean-Charles Trouabal	France	21.31	
10	1	Sandro Floris	Italy	21.39	
11	2	Paolo Catalano	Italy	21.67	
	1	Donovan Reid	Great Britain	DQ	

=== Final ===
Rank	Lane	Name	Nationality	Time	Notes
1st place, gold medalist(s)	5	Nikolay Razgonov	Soviet Union	20.62	PB
2nd place, silver medalist(s)	4	Nikolay Antonov	Bulgaria	20.65	
3rd place, bronze medalist(s)	3	Linford Christie	Great Britain	20.83	
4	6	Andreas Berger	Austria	20.85	
5	2	Norbert Dobeleit	West Germany	21.37	
6	1	Daniel Sangouma	France	21.57	
