= 1986 European Athletics Championships – Men's 200 metres =

Men's 200 metres at the 1986 European Athletics Championships
- Venue: Neckarstadion
- Location: Stuttgart
- Dates: 28 August (heats & semi-finals); 29 August (final)
- Competitors: 25 from 13 nations
- Winning time: 20.52

Medalists
gold medal	Vladimir Krylov	Soviet Union
silver medal	Jürgen Evers	West Germany
bronze medal	Andrey Fedoriv	Soviet Union

These are the official results of the Men's 200 metres event at the 1986 European Championships in Stuttgart, West Germany, held at Neckarstadion on 28 and 29 August 1986.

== Participation ==
According to an unofficial count, 25 athletes from 13 countries participated in the event.

- Belgium (1)
- Denmark (2)
- East Germany (3)
- France (2)
- Great Britain (3)
- Ireland (1)
- Italy (2)
- Liechtenstein (1)
- Norway (1)
- Portugal (3)
- Soviet Union (3)
- Sweden (1)
- West Germany (2)

== Results ==
=== Heats ===
28 August

==== Heat 1 ====
Rank	Name	Nationality	Time	Notes
1	Allan Wells	Great Britain	20.88	Q
2	Andrey Fedoriv	Soviet Union	20.90	Q
3	Pierfrancesco Pavoni	Italy	20.99	Q
4	Thomas Schröder	East Germany	21.03	q
5	Jeroen Fischer	Belgium	21.58	
6	Lars Pedersen	Denmark	21.75	
7	Phil Snoddy	Ireland	21.83	
8	Markus Büchel	Liechtenstein	22.23	
			Wind: -0.9 m/s	

==== Heat 2 ====
Rank	Name	Nationality	Time	Notes
1	Aleksandr Yevgenyev	Soviet Union	20.72	Q
2	Stefano Tilli	Italy	20.79	Q
3	Frank Emmelmann	East Germany	21.15	Q
4	Peter Eriksson	Sweden	21.39	
5	Arnaldo Abrantes	Portugal	21.50	
			Wind: -1.7 m/s	

==== Heat 3 ====
Rank	Name	Nationality	Time	Notes
1	Linford Christie	Great Britain	20.78	Q
2	Olaf Prenzler	East Germany	20.91	Q
3	Volker Westhagemann	West Germany	20.91	Q
4	Bruno Marie-Rose	France	20.97	q
5	Einar Sagli	Norway	21.34	q
6	Pedro Agostinho	Portugal	21.48	
			Wind: -0.3 m/s	

==== Heat 4 ====
Rank	Name	Nationality	Time	Notes
1	Jürgen Evers	West Germany	20.64	Q
2	Vladimir Krylov	Soviet Union	20.69	Q
3	Pascal Barré	France	20.80	Q
4	Luís Cunha	Portugal	21.19	q
5	Morten Kjems	Denmark	21.84	
	Todd Bennett	Great Britain	DNF	
			Wind: -0.5 m/s	

=== Semi-finals ===
28 August

==== Heat 1 ====
Rank	Name	Nationality	Time	Notes
1	Vladimir Krylov	Soviet Union	20.61	Q
2	Aleksandr Yevgenyev	Soviet Union	20.66	Q
3	Allan Wells	Great Britain	20.77	Q
4	Frank Emmelmann	East Germany	20.82	Q
5	Pascal Barré	France	20.88	
6	Bruno Marie-Rose	France	20.97	
7	Volker Westhagemann	West Germany	21.04	
8	Luís Cunha	Portugal	21.31	

==== Heat 2 ====
Rank	Name	Nationality	Time	Notes
1	Thomas Schröder	East Germany	20.54	Q
2	Jürgen Evers	West Germany	20.58	Q
3	Andrey Fedoriv	Soviet Union	20.60	Q
4	Olaf Prenzler	East Germany	20.68	Q
5	Linford Christie	Great Britain	20.69	
6	Stefano Tilli	Italy	20.74	
7	Pierfrancesco Pavoni	Italy	20.85	
8	Einar Sagli	Norway	21.23	

=== Final ===
29 August

Rank	Name	Nationality	Time	Notes
1st place, gold medalist(s)	Vladimir Krylov	Soviet Union	20.52	
2nd place, silver medalist(s)	Jürgen Evers	West Germany	20.75	
3rd place, bronze medalist(s)	Andrey Fedoriv	Soviet Union	20.84	
4	Thomas Schröder	East Germany	20.89	
5	Allan Wells	Great Britain	20.89	
6	Aleksandr Yevgenyev	Soviet Union	20.91	
7	Olaf Prenzler	East Germany	21.00	
8	Frank Emmelmann	East Germany	21.03	

== See also ==
- 1984 Men's Olympic 200 metres (Los Angeles)
- 1987 Men's World Championships 200 metres (Rome)
- 1988 Men's Olympic 200 metres (Seoul)
- 1990 Men's European Championships 200 metres (Split)
