= 1985 European Athletics Indoor Championships – Men's 200 metres =

The men's 200 metres event at the 1985 European Athletics Indoor Championships was held on 2 and 3 March.

== Medalists ==
Gold	Silver	Bronze
Stefano Tilli; Italy	Olaf Prenzler; East Germany	Aleksandr Yevgenyev; Soviet Union

== Results ==
=== Heats ===
The winner from each heat (Q) and the next 4 fastest (q) qualified for the semifinals.

Rank	Heat	Name	Nationality	Time	Notes
1	5	Aleksandr Yevgenyev	Soviet Union	21.14	Q
2	5	Daniel Sangouma	France	21.14	q
3	1	Stefano Tilli	Italy	21.15	Q
3	2	Olaf Prenzler	East Germany	21.15	Q
5	2	Carlo Simionato	Italy	21.23	q
6	4	Antonio Sánchez	Spain	21.36	Q
7	4	Roland Jokl	Austria	21.39	q
8	6	Ade Mafe	Great Britain	21.40	Q
9	3	István Nagy	Hungary	21.41	Q
10	6	Rolf Kistner	West Germany	21.42	q
11	1	Linford Christie	Great Britain	21.50	
12	5	Earl Tulloch	Great Britain	21.65	
13	2	Aleksandar Popović	Yugoslavia	21.73	
13	3	Thomas Wild	Switzerland	21.73	
15	4	Frank Pilgram	West Germany	21.80	
16	1	Georgios Vamvakas	Greece	21.94	
17	1	Tore Bergan	Norway	21.94	
18	4	Kosmas Stratos	Greece	22.02	
19	5	Per-Ola Olsson	Sweden	22.08	
20	2	Pedro Agostinho	Portugal	22.16	
21	3	Kenth Rönn	Sweden	22.25	
22	6	Georgios Kaikis	Greece	22.34	
23	6	Luís Cunha	Portugal	22.34	
24	2	Ioannis Ioannou	Cyprus	22.57	
25	3	Jean-Claude Gengler	Luxembourg	22.58	
	1	Attila Kovács	Hungary	DNS	

=== Semifinals ===
First 2 from each semifinal (Q) and the next 1 fastest (q) qualified for the final.

Rank	Heat	Name	Nationality	Time	Notes
1	2	Olaf Prenzler	East Germany	20.81	Q, CR
2	1	Stefano Tilli	Italy	20.96	Q
3	2	Aleksandr Yevgenyev	Soviet Union	20.97	Q
4	2	István Nagy	Hungary	21.03	q
5	2	Carlo Simionato	Italy	21.16	
6	1	Daniel Sangouma	France	21.21	Q
7	1	Rolf Kistner	West Germany	21.22	
8	1	Antonio Sánchez	Spain	21.23	
9	2	Ade Mafe	Great Britain	21.38	
10	1	Roland Jokl	Austria	21.67	

=== Final ===
Rank	Lane	Name	Nationality	Time	Notes
1st place, gold medalist(s)	4	Stefano Tilli	Italy	20.77	CR
2nd place, silver medalist(s)	3	Olaf Prenzler	East Germany	20.83	
3rd place, bronze medalist(s)	2	Aleksandr Yevgenyev	Soviet Union	20.95	
4	5	Daniel Sangouma	France	21.13	
5	1	István Nagy	Hungary	21.53	
