= 1987 IAAF World Indoor Championships – Men's 200 metres =

The men's 200 metres event at the 1987 IAAF World Indoor Championships was held at the Hoosier Dome in Indianapolis on 6 and 8 March.

== Medalists ==
Gold	Silver	Bronze
Kirk Baptiste; United States	Bruno Marie-Rose; France	Robson da Silva; Brazil

== Results ==
=== Heats ===
The first 2 of each heat (Q) and next 6 fastest (q) qualified for the semifinals.

Rank	Heat	Name	Nationality	Time	Notes
1	5	Gilles Quénéhervé	France	21.05	Q
2	1	Bruno Marie-Rose	France	21.15	Q
3	5	Nikolay Razgonov	Soviet Union	21.19	Q
4	3	James Butler	United States	21.27	Q
5	3	Cyprian Enweani	Canada	21.32	Q
6	6	Kirk Baptiste	United States	21.36	Q
7	5	Donovan Reid	Great Britain	21.40	q
8	1	Attila Kovács	Hungary	21.58	Q
9	4	Clive Wright	Jamaica	21.61	Q
10	4	Robson da Silva	Brazil	21.63	Q
11	6	Erwin Skamrahl	West Germany	21.64	Q
12	2	Vladimir Krylov	Soviet Union	21.65	Q
13	1	Leandro Peñalver	Cuba	21.77	q
14	2	Dazel Jules	Trinidad and Tobago	21.79	Q
15	3	Antonio Sánchez	Spain	21.81	q
16	6	Neville Hodge	United States Virgin Islands	21.83	q, NR
17	3	Harouna Palé	Burkina Faso	21.95	q, NR
18	6	Marco Mautinho	Peru	22.17	q, NR
19	5	Jimmy Flemming	United States Virgin Islands	22.36	
20	4	John Anzrah	Kenya	22.40	NR
21	1	Esteban Carpio	Dominican Republic	22.53	NR
22	3	Lenford O'Garro	Saint Vincent and the Grenadines	22.65	NR
23	4	Trevor Davis	Anguilla	22.72	NR
24	5	Carl Chicksen	Zimbabwe	22.84	NR
25	4	Sunday Olweny	Uganda	23.02	NR
26	6	Rodney Cox	Turks and Caicos Islands	23.05	NR
27	2	William George	Turks and Caicos Islands	23.59	NR
	1	Cyril Brioche	Seychelles	DQ	
	1	Mustapha Kamel Selmi	Algeria	DNS	
	2	Victor Edet	Nigeria	DNS	
	2	David Kitur	Kenya	DNS	
	3	Fabian Whymns	Bahamas	DNS	
	4	Ronald Desruelles	Belgium	DNS	
	5	Gregory Meghoo	Jamaica	DNS	
	6	Gabriel Okon	Nigeria	DNS	

=== Semifinals ===
First 2 of each semifinal (Q) qualified directly for the final.

Rank	Heat	Name	Nationality	Time	Notes
1	1	Kirk Baptiste	United States	20.91	Q
2	3	James Butler	United States	20.97	Q
3	2	Bruno Marie-Rose	France	21.12	Q
4	3	Robson da Silva	Brazil	21.21	Q
5	2	Donovan Reid	Great Britain	21.30	Q
6	1	Gilles Quénéhervé	France	21.39	Q
7	3	Nikolay Razgonov	Soviet Union	21.42	
8	1	Cyprian Enweani	Canada	21.48	
8	2	Erwin Skamrahl	West Germany	21.48	
10	1	Dazel Jules	Trinidad and Tobago	21.57	
11	3	Clive Wright	Jamaica	21.73	
12	2	Attila Kovács	Hungary	21.79	
13	1	Leandro Peñalver	Cuba	21.95	
14	2	Harouna Palé	Burkina Faso	22.20	
15	3	Neville Hodge	United States Virgin Islands	22.26	
	3	Antonio Sánchez	Spain	DNF	
	1	Vladimir Krylov	Soviet Union	DNS	
	2	Marco Mautinho	Peru	DNS	

=== Final ===
Rank	Lane	Name	Nationality	Time	Notes
1st place, gold medalist(s)	4	Kirk Baptiste	United States	20.73	CR, PB
2nd place, silver medalist(s)	5	Bruno Marie-Rose	France	20.89	
3rd place, bronze medalist(s)	2	Robson da Silva	Brazil	20.92	
4	6	Gilles Quénéhervé	France	20.97	
5	3	James Butler	United States	21.05	
6	1	Donovan Reid	Great Britain	21.53	
