= Athletics at the Friendship Games – Men's 200 metres =

The men's 200 metres event at the Friendship Games was held on 18 August 1984 at the Grand Arena of the Central Lenin Stadium in Moscow, Soviet Union.

== Medalists ==
Gold	Silver	Bronze
Vladimir Muravyov; Soviet Union	Aleksandr Yevgenyev; Soviet Union	Olaf Prenzler; East Germany

== Results ==
=== Heats ===
Rank	Name	Nationality	Time	Notes
9	Ali Bakhta	Algeria	21.26	
10	Czesław Prądzyński	Poland	21.40	
11	Miroslav Púchovský	Czechoslovakia	21.41	
12	Leszek Dunecki	Poland	21.42	
13	Marco Mautino	Peru	21.70	
14	Nguyen Truong Hoa	Vietnam	21.94	
15	Stanislav Sajdok	Czechoslovakia	21.97	
16	Giorgio Mautino	Peru	22.04	
17	H. Rose	Seychelles	22.07	
18	A. Raweluson	Malaysia	22.29	
19	The Cheu	Vietnam	22.34	
20	Humberto Newball	Nicaragua	22.67	
21	S. Aalchaawelech	Syria	22.83	
22	Mamoudou Bangura	Guinea	22.91	
23	G. Hassuna	South Yemen	23.23	
24	Fadi Mikaelian	Lebanon	23.66	
25	H. Abdulkader	Syria	23.72	
26	C. Pereira	Cape Verde	23.83	
27	H. Maama	Guinea	23.90	
28	K. Wimen	Cambodia	23.90	
29	T. Rithia	Cambodia	24.16	
30	P. Sophal	Cambodia	24.20	
31	G. Matala	Guinea	26.27	

=== Final ===
Wind: -1.2 m/s

Rank	Name	Nationality	Time	Notes
1st place, gold medalist(s)	Vladimir Muravyov	Soviet Union	20.34	
2nd place, silver medalist(s)	Aleksandr Yevgenyev	Soviet Union	20.41	
3rd place, bronze medalist(s)	Olaf Prenzler	East Germany	20.58	
4	Leandro Peñalver	Cuba	20.65	
5	František Břečka	Czechoslovakia	20.65	
6	Sergey Sokolov	Soviet Union	20.78	
7	Tomás González	Cuba	20.80	
8	Silvio Leonard	Cuba	20.82	

== See also ==
- Athletics at the 1984 Summer Olympics – Men's 200 metres
