= Czesław Prądzyński =

Polish sprinter

Personal information
- Born: 24 August 1960 Piece, Poland
- Height: 1.78 m (5 ft 10 in)
- Weight: 75 kg (165 lb)

Sport
- Sport: Athletics
- Event: 200 metres
- Club: MKS Kalisz (1978); Calisia (1979-83); Legia Warszawa

Czesław Prądzyński (born 24 August 1960 in Piece) is a Polish former sprinter who specialised in the 200 metres. He represented his country in the 4 × 100 metres relay at the 1983 World Championships finishing sixth in the final. He later won a bronze medal at the 1984 Friendship Games which were organised for the countries boycotting the 1984 Summer Olympics.

== International competitions ==
Year	Competition	Venue	Position	Event	Notes
Representing Poland
1979	European Junior Championships	Bydgoszcz, Poland	9th	200 m	21.57
1983	European Indoor Championships	Budapest, Hungary	6th (sf)	200 m	21.25
1983	World Championships	Helsinki, Finland	6th	4 × 100 m relay	38.72
1984	European Indoor Championships	Gothenburg, Sweden	9th (sf)	200 m	DQ
1984	Friendship Games	Moscow, Soviet Union	10th (sf)	200 m	21.40
1984	Friendship Games	Moscow, Soviet Union	3rd	4 × 100 m relay	38.81

== Personal bests ==
Outdoor

- 100 metres – 10.32 (+1.9 m/s, Grudziądz 1986)
- 200 metres – 20.70 (+1.7 m/s, Lublin 1984)

Indoor

- 200 metres – 21.23 (+1.9 m/s, Turin 1984)
