= Jokl =

Jokl is a Jewish surname, a diminutive of Jacob. Notable people with this name include:

- Karol Jokl (1945–1996), Slovak football player
- Norbert Jokl (1877 – probably May 1942), Austrian Albanologist of Jewish descent
- Roland Jokl (born 1962), Austrian athlete
