= José Javier Arqués =

Spanish sprinter

Personal information
- Full name: José Javier Arqués Ferrer
- Born: 16 May 1960 (age 66) Onil, Alicante, Spain
- Height: 1.81 m (5 ft 11 in)
- Weight: 74 kg (163 lb)

Sport
- Sport: Athletics
- Event: 100 metres
- Club: CD Onil (1980-1985); FC Barcelona (1986); Larios AAM (1987-1992)
- Coached by: Francisco López

José Javier Arqués Ferrer (Note: In this Spanish name, the first or paternal surname is Arqués and the second or maternal family name is Ferrer.) (born 16 May 1960) is a retired Spanish athlete who competed in sprinting events. He represented his country at three consecutive Summer Olympics, starting in 1984, as well as one outdoor and one indoor World Championships. In addition, he won six back-to-back 100 metres national titles from 1984 to 1989.

== International competitions ==
Year	Competition	Venue	Position	Event	Notes
Representing Spain
1979	European Junior Championships	Bydgoszcz, Poland	14th (sf)	100 m	10.98
1979	Mediterranean Games	Split, Yugoslavia	5th (h)	100 m	10.74
1979	Mediterranean Games	Split, Yugoslavia	5th	4×100 m relay	41.33
1982	European Indoor Championships	Milan, Italy	6th	60 m	6.71
1984	European Indoor Championships	Gothenburg, Sweden	5th	60 m	6.72
1984	Olympic Games	Los Angeles, United States	18th (qf)	100 m	10.52
1985	European Indoor Championships	Piraeus, Greece	10th (h)	60 m	6.73^{1}
1986	European Indoor Championships	Madrid, Spain	6th	60 m	6.70
1986	European Championships	Stuttgart, West Germany	16th (sf)	100 m	10.54
1986	Ibero-American Championships	Havana, Cuba	3rd	4×100 m relay	40.15
1987	European Indoor Championships	Liévin, France	8th (sf)	60 m	6.64
1987	World Indoor Championships	Indianapolis, United States	17th (h)	60 m	6.75
1987	World Championships	Rome, Italy	21st (qf)	100 m	10.46
1987	World Championships	Rome, Italy	12th (sf)	4×100 m relay	39.74
1988	European Indoor Championships	Budapest, Hungary	11th (sf)	60 m	6.70
1988	Ibero-American Championships	Mexico City, Mexico	4th	100 m	10.27
1988	Ibero-American Championships	Mexico City, Mexico	2nd	4×100 m relay	39.36
1988	Olympic Games	Seoul, South Korea	28th (qf)	100 m	10.43
1988	Olympic Games	Seoul, South Korea	–	4×100 m relay	DNF
1989	European Indoor Championships	The Hague, Netherlands	12th (sf)	60 m	6.73
1989	World Cup	Barcelona, Spain	7th	100 m	10.48
1989	World Cup	Barcelona, Spain	9th	4×100 m relay	39.69
1990	European Indoor Championships	Glasgow, United Kingdom	5th (sf)	60 m	6.66
1990	European Championships	Split, Yugoslavia	6th	4×100 m relay	39.10
1992	Ibero-American Championships	Seville, Spain	2nd	4×100 m relay	39.44
1992	Olympic Games	Barcelona, Spain	11th (sf)	4×100 m relay	39.62

^{1}Did not finish in the semifinals

== Personal bests ==
Outdoor

- 100 metres – 10.21 (+1.8 m/s, Madrid 1986)
- 200 metres – 21.01 (-0.9 m/s, Manresa 1985)

Indoor

- 60 metres – 6.60 (Madrid 1986)
