= Germany at the European Athletics Championships =

Germany team at athletics event

- WA code: GER
- National federation: DLV
- Website: www.leichtathletik.de/verband/
- Medals Ranked 5th: Gold 71 Silver 72 Bronze 69 Total 212

European Athletics Championships appearances (overview)
- 1934; 1938; 1946–1950; 1954; 1958; 1962; 1966–1990; 1994; 1998; 2002; 2006; 2010; 2012; 2014; 2016; 2018; 2022; 2024

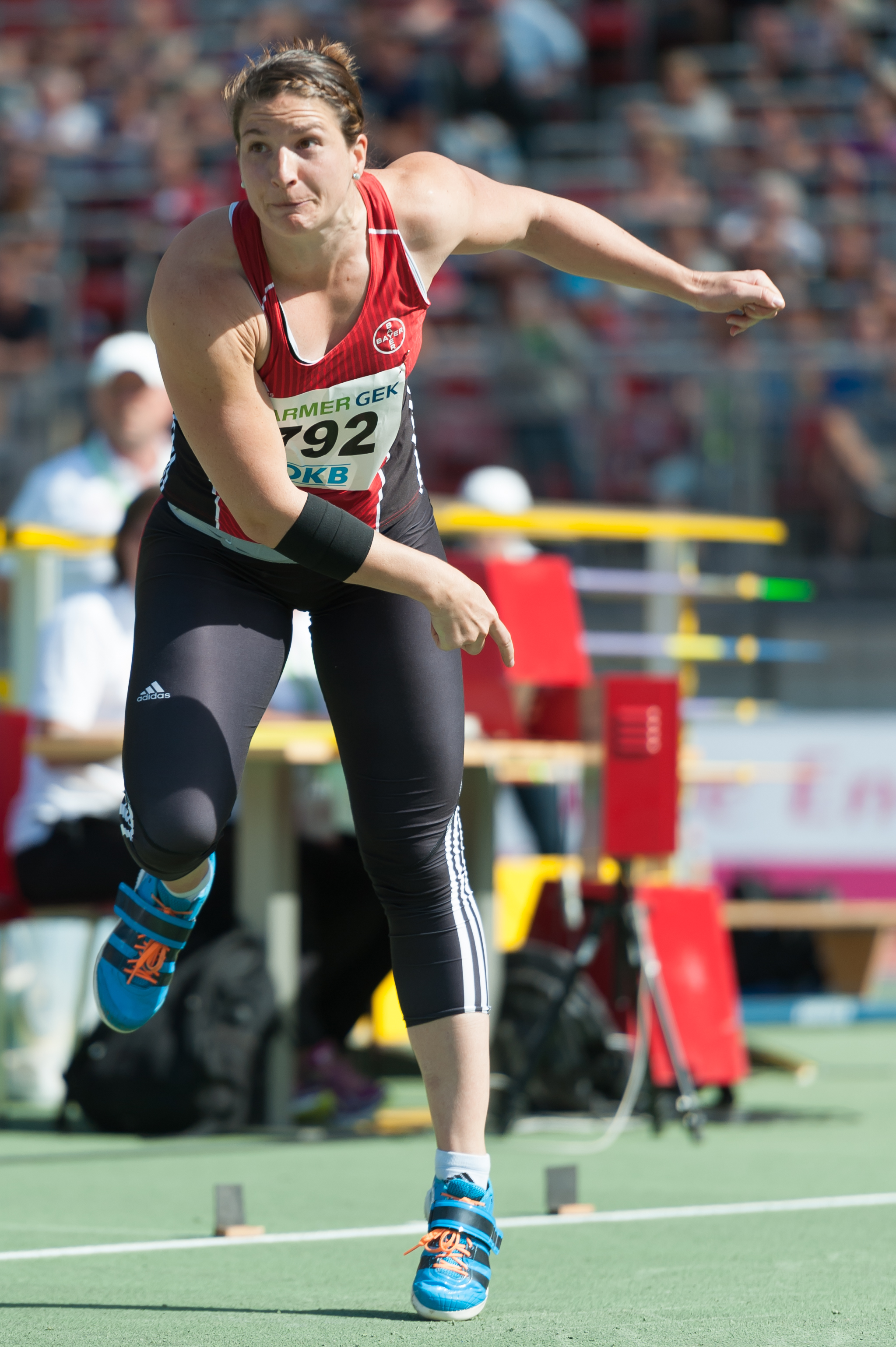
Linda Stahl, four medals in the javelin throw, is the most medalists German woman.

Germany at the European Athletics Championships participated at the first two editions (1934 and 1938) and, after the Fall of the Berlin Wall, from 1994 at all editions of the European Athletics Championships.

== Medal count ==
Edition	Gold	Silver	Bronze	Total	Rank
1934 Turin	7	2	2	11	1
1938 Paris / Vienna	12	11	9	32	1
1994 Helsinki	5	4	5	14	3
1998 Budapest	8	7	8	23	2
2002 Munich	2	9	8	19	8
2006 Gothenburg	4	5	2	11	2
2010 Barcelona	5	6	6	17	4
2012 Helsinki	6	8	4	18	1
2014 Zurich	4	1	3	8	3
2016 Amsterdam	5	4	7	16	2
2018 Berlin	6	7	7	20	3
2022 Munich	6	6	2	14	2
2024 Rome	1	2	6	9	12
Total	71	72	69	212	5

== See also ==
- German Athletics Association
- Germany at the World Athletics Championships
- Germany at the European Athletics Team Championships
