= Mark Witherspoon =

American former sprinter (born 1963)

Personal information
- Nationality: American
- Born: September 3, 1963 (age 63) Chicago, Illinois, U.S.
- Height: 6 ft 5 in (196 cm)
- Weight: 187 lb (85 kg)

Sport
- Country: United States
- Sport: Track
- Events: 100 m, 200 m
- College team: UW Parkside; Abilene Christian
- Club: Santa Monica Track Club

Donald Mark Witherspoon (born September 3, 1963, in Chicago) is an American former sprinter. He joined his high school track team after having success as a cornerback on the football team. In college, he was primarily a 200 m and 400 m runner. He recorded an impressive 19.3 200 m split on a 4 × 200 m and a 43.9 440 yd leg on a 4×440 yd while in college. As a professional, he competed in the 1992 Summer Olympics, where he tore his achilles tendon after starting at the 100 m semifinals.

== International competitions ==
Year	Competition	Venue	Position	Event	Notes
Representing the United States
1987	World Indoor Championships	Indianapolis, United States	2nd	60 m	6.54
1987	World Championships	Rome, Italy	35th (h)	100 m	10.65
1990	Goodwill Games	Seattle, United States	3rd	100 m	10.17
1992	Olympic Games	Barcelona, Spain	4th (qf)	100 m	10.19^{1}
1994	World Cup	London, United Kingdom	3rd	4 × 100 m relay	39.33

^{1}Did not finish in the semifinals

== Personal bests ==
Outdoor

- 100 meters – 10.04 (+1.8 m/s, San José 1987)
- 200 meters – 20.12 (+1.0 m/s, Houston 1989)
