= Antoine Richard =

French sprinter (born 1960)

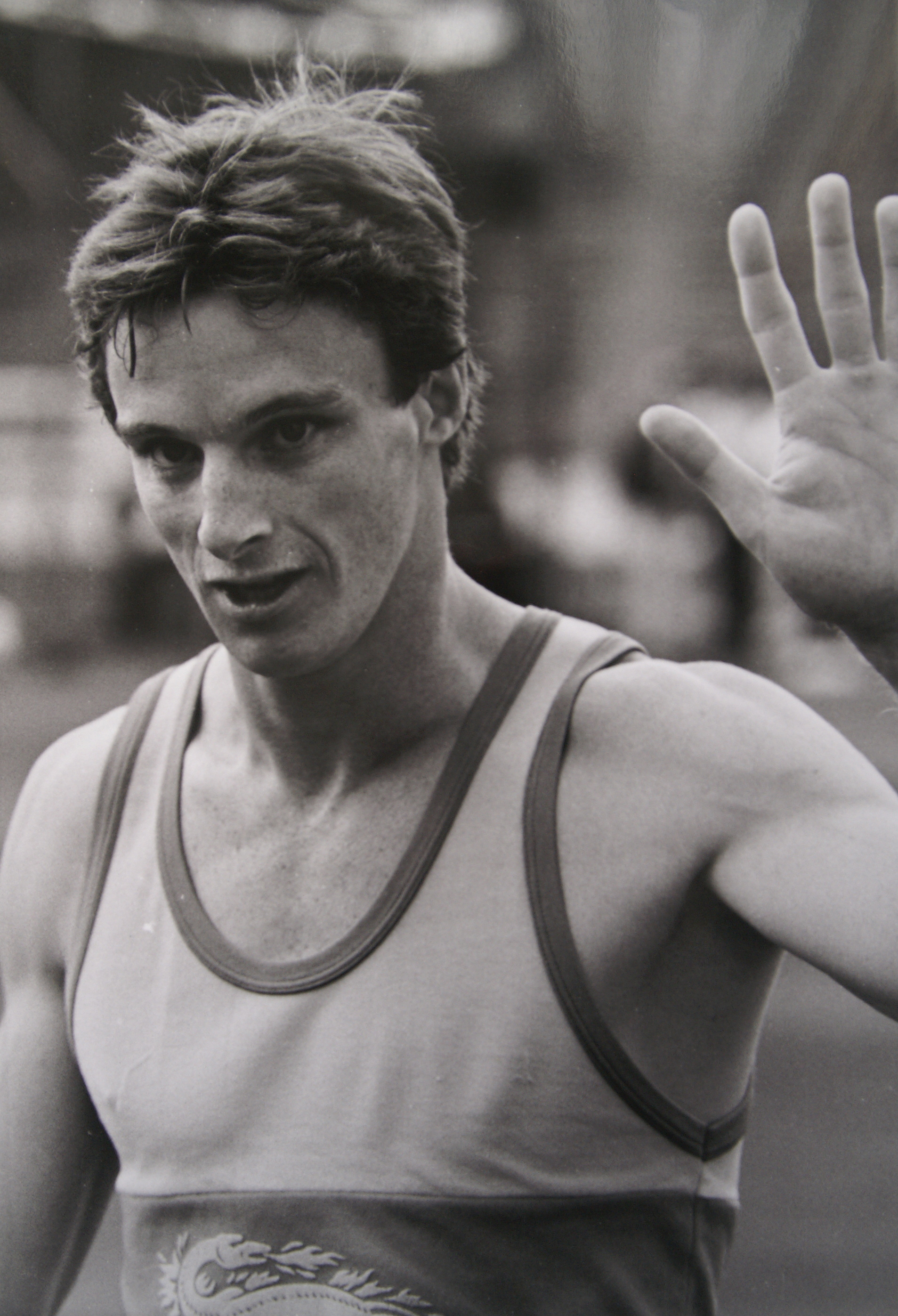
- Antoine Richard in 1985

Personal information
- Born: 8 September 1960 (age 65) Fontainebleau, France
- Height: 1.74 m (5 ft 9 in)
- Weight: 63 kg (139 lb)

Sport
- Club: Club Sportive Fontainebleau
Medal record
Men's Athletics
Representing France
Olympic Games
Bronze medal – third place	1980 Moscow	4 x 100 metre relay

Antoine Richard (born 8 September 1960) is a former athlete from France who mainly competed in the 100 metres. He was French 100 metre champion on 5 occasions, and also 200 metre winner in 1985.

He also won the French 60 metres title 5 times as well.

He competed for France at the 1980 Summer Olympics held in Moscow, Soviet Union where he ran in the 100 metres where he reached the Quarter final, but he won the bronze medal in the 4 x 100 metre relay with his team mates Pascal Barré, Patrick Barré and Hermann Panzo.

In 1983 he was 3rd place in the European cup 100metres in London. In 1985 he was European 60 metre silver medalist behind Mike McFarlane of the U.K.

== International competitions ==
Representing France
Year	Competition	Venue	Position	Event	Notes
1979	European Junior Championships	Bydgoszcz, Poland	6th	100 m	10.55
1979	European Junior Championships	Bydgoszcz, Poland	6th	4 × 100 m relay	40.79
1979	Mediterranean Games	Split, Yugoslavia	4th	100 m	10.70
1979	Mediterranean Games	Split, Yugoslavia	2nd	4 × 100 m relay	39.98
1980	Olympic Games	Moscow, Soviet Union	23rd (qf)	100 m	10.45
1980	Olympic Games	Moscow, Soviet Union	3rd	4 × 100 m relay	38.53
1981	European Indoor Championships	Grenoble, France	4th	50 m	5.78
1982	European Indoor Championships	Milan, Italy	11th (sf)	60 m	6.73
1982	European Championships	Athens, Greece	26th (h)	100 m	10.66
1982	European Championships	Athens, Greece	7th	4 × 100 m relay	39.22
1983	European Indoor Championships	Budapest, Hungary	4th	60 m	6.66
1983	World Championships	Helsinki, Finland	15th (qf)	100 m	10.44
1983	World Championships	Helsinki, Finland	8th	4 × 100 m relay	38.98
1983	Mediterranean Games	Casablanca, Morocco	2nd	100 m	10.26
1983	Mediterranean Games	Casablanca, Morocco	2nd	4 × 100 m relay	39.54
1984	European Indoor Championships	Gothenburg, Sweden	4th	60 m	6.70
1984	Olympic Games	Los Angeles, United States	19th (qf)	100 m	10.53
1984	Olympic Games	Los Angeles, United States	6th	4 × 100 m relay	39.10
1985	World Indoor Games	Paris, France	10th (sf)	60 m	6.78
1985	European Indoor Championships	Piraeus, Greece	2nd	60 m	6.63
1986	European Indoor Championships	Madrid, Spain	5th (sf)	60 m	6.64
1986	European Championships	Stuttgart, West Germany	8th	100 m	10.34
1986	European Championships	Stuttgart, West Germany	4th	4 × 100 m relay	38.81
1987	European Indoor Championships	Liévin, France	6th	60 m	6.63
1987	World Indoor Championships	Indianapolis, United States	9th (sf)	60 m	6.69
1990	European Indoor Championships	Glasgow, United Kingdom	15th (h)	60 m	6.78
1991	Mediterranean Games	Athens, Greece	7th	100 m	10.57
1991	Mediterranean Games	Athens, Greece	3rd	4 × 100 m relay	39.99
