= Kirk Baptiste =

American sprinter (1962–2022)

Personal information
- Born: June 20, 1962 Beaumont, Texas, U.S.
- Died: March 24, 2022 (aged 59)

Sport
- Country: United States
- Sport: Track
- Event: Sprints
- College team: Houston
- Club: Athletics West; Santa Monica Track Club
Medal record
Men's athletics
Representing the United States
Olympic Games
Silver medal – second place	1984 Los Angeles	200 m
World Indoor Championships
Gold medal – first place	1987 Indianapolis	200 m

Kirk Baptiste (June 20, 1962 – March 24, 2022) was an American track and field athlete, who mainly competed in the 200 metres. He was born in Beaumont, Texas. He competed for the United States at the 1984 Summer Olympics held in Los Angeles, United States, where he won the silver medal in the 200 metres with a time of 19.96 seconds. This was the first time anyone had broken 20 seconds and come second in the race. In his first race following the Olympics, on 18th August 1984 in Crystal Palace, England, Bapstiste broke the world record for 300 metres. In that race, Baptiste ran 31.70 seconds, beating the record of his compatriate, Mel Lattany (32.16 sec) and finishing ahead of Carl Lewis, the 200 metres gold medalist from the Los Angeles games. He decided to forgo his final season of eligibility at the University of Houston after his successful junior year.
