= Luís Cunha (athlete) =

Portuguese sprinter

Personal information
- Full name: Luís Filipe Vítorino Cunha
- Born: 5 December 1964 (age 61) Lisbon, Portugal
- Height: 1.75 m (5 ft 9 in)
- Weight: 68 kg (150 lb)

Sport
- Sport: Athletics
- Events: 100 m, 200 m
- Club: Benfica Lisbon

Luís Filipe Vítorino Cunha (born 5 December 1964) is a former Portuguese sprinter. He represented his country at the 1988, 1992, and 1996 Summer Olympics as well as one outdoor and two indoor World Championships. In addition, he won two medals in the 200 metres at the Ibero-American Championships.

He later worked as the sprints and hurdles head coach for the Singapore athletics team.

== International competitions ==
| Year | Competition | Venue | Position | Event | Notes |
Representing Portugal
| 1983 | Ibero-American Championships | Barcelona, Spain | 4th | 200 m | 21.74 |
| 1983 | Ibero-American Championships | Barcelona, Spain | 4th | 4x400 m relay | 3:15.74 |
| 1985 | European Indoor Championships | Piraeus, Greece | 24th (h) | 60 m | 7.08 |
| 1985 | European Indoor Championships | Piraeus, Greece | 23rd (h) | 200 m | 22.34 |
| 1986 | European Indoor Championships | Madrid, Spain | 19th (h) | 60 m | 6.92 |
| 1986 | European Indoor Championships | Madrid, Spain | 13th (h) | 200 m | 22.02 |
| 1986 | European Championships | Stuttgart, West Germany | 25th (h) | 100 m | 10.74 |
| 1986 | European Championships | Stuttgart, West Germany | 16th (h) | 200 m | 21.31 |
| 1986 | European Championships | Stuttgart, West Germany | 8th | 4x100 m relay | 39.74 |
| 1986 | Ibero-American Championships | Havana, Cuba | 6th | 100 m | 10.63 |
| 1986 | Ibero-American Championships | Havana, Cuba | 2nd | 200 m | 21.08 |
| 1987 | European Indoor Championships | Liévin, France | 14th (h) | 200 m | 21.83 |
| 1987 | World Championships | Rome, Italy | 16th (sf) | 4x100 m relay | 40.24 |
| 1988 | European Indoor Championships | Budapest, Hungary | 18th (h) | 60 m | 7.00 |
| 1988 | European Indoor Championships | Budapest, Hungary | 17th (h) | 200 m | 21.67 |
| 1988 | Ibero-American Championships | Mexico City, Mexico | 9th (h) | 100 m | 10.36 |
| 1988 | Ibero-American Championships | Mexico City, Mexico | 3rd | 4x100 m relay | 39.63 |
| 1988 | Olympic Games | Seoul, South Korea | 69th (h) | 100 m | 10.80 |
| 1988 | Olympic Games | Seoul, South Korea | 44th (h) | 200 m | 21.72 |
| 1989 | European Indoor Championships | The Hague, Netherlands | 21st (h) | 60 m | 6.92 |
| 1989 | European Indoor Championships | The Hague, Netherlands | 12th (sf) | 200 m | 22.18 |
| 1989 | World Indoor Championships | Budapest, Hungary | 29th (h) | 60 m | 6.90 |
| 1989 | World Indoor Championships | Budapest, Hungary | 13th (h) | 200 m | 21.93 |
| 1989 | Universiade | Duisburg, West Germany | 31st (qf) | 100 m | 10.78 |
| 1989 | Universiade | Duisburg, West Germany | 22nd (qf) | 200 m | 21.37 |
| 1990 | European Indoor Championships | Genoa, Italy | 11th (h) | 200 m | 21.60 |
| 1990 | Ibero-American Championships | Manaus, Brazil | 3rd | 200 m | 21.45 |
| 1990 | Ibero-American Championships | Manaus, Brazil | 3rd | 4x100 m relay | 40.82 |
| 1991 | Universiade | Sheffield, United Kingdom | 28th (h) | 100 m | 10.75 |
| 1991 | Universiade | Sheffield, United Kingdom | 22nd (h) | 200 m | 21.98 |
| 1992 | European Indoor Championships | Genoa, Italy | 26th (h) | 60 m | 7.03 |
| 1992 | European Indoor Championships | Genoa, Italy | 18th (h) | 200 m | 21.62 |
| 1992 | Ibero-American Championships | Seville, Spain | 9th (h) | 200 m | 21.52 |
| 1992 | Olympic Games | Barcelona, Spain | 18th (h) | 4x100 m relay | 40.30 |
| 1994 | Ibero-American Championships | Mar del Plata, Argentina | 6th | 100 m | 10.73 (w) |
| 1994 | Ibero-American Championships | Mar del Plata, Argentina | 7th | 200 m | 21.18 |
| 1995 | World Indoor Championships | Barcelona, Spain | 24th (h) | 60 m | 6.78 |
| 1996 | Ibero-American Championships | Medellín, Colombia | 6th | 100 m | 10.47 |
| 1996 | Ibero-American Championships | Medellín, Colombia | 8th (h) | 200 m | 21.52^{1} |
| 1996 | Olympic Games | Atlanta, United States | 72nd (h) | 100 m | 10.65 |
| 1998 | Ibero-American Championships | Lisbon, Portugal | 13th (h) | 100 m | 10.68 |

^{1}Did not finish in the final

== Personal bests ==
Outdoor

- 100 metres – 10.34 (+1.0 m/s, Maia 1996)
- 200 metres – 20.71 (Mexico City 1988)

Indoor

- 60 metres – 6.78 (Barcelona 1995)
- 200 metres – 21.50 (Hague 1989)
