= Germany at the European Athletics Team Championships =

Germany team at athletics event

- WA code: GER
- National federation: DLV
- Website: www.leichtathletik.de/verband/
- Medals Ranked 1st: Gold 60 Silver 60 Bronze 51 Total 171

Germany at the European Athletics Team Championships participated at all editions of the European Athletics Team Championships from Leiria 2009.

== Final standings ==
Germany participated in the Super League in all editions and was three-time winner.

Country	2009	2010	2011	2013	2014	2015	2017	2019	2021
Germany	1	3	2	2	1	2	1	2	4

== Results ==
=== Overall ===
Edition	1st place, gold medalist(s)	2nd place, silver medalist(s)	3rd place, bronze medalist(s)	4	5	6	7	8
(Portugal) Leiria 2009	5	6	6	5	4	4	2	1
(Norway) Bergen 2010	6	6	5	2	2	6	3	2
(Sweden) Stockholm 2011	6	6	8	4	1	5	2	3
(United Kingdom) Gateshead 2013	7	5	5	4	7	5	4	2
(Germany) Braunschweig 2014	10	10	5	3	3	3	0	1
(Russia) Cheboksary 2015	6	7	5	5	6	4	2	1
(France) Lille 2017	7	11	6	2	2	4	4	1
(Poland) Bydgoszcz 2019	6	4	5	5	4	4	3	2
(Poland) Silesia 2021	7	5	9	6	6	2	1	-
	60	60	51	36	35	37	21	13

== See also ==
- German Athletics Association
- Germany at the World Athletics Championships
- Germany at the European Athletics Championships
