= Nikolay Razgonov =

Ukrainian sprinter

Personal information
- Born: 16 January 1964 (age 61)

Sport
- Sport: Athletics
- Event: 200 metres

Nikolay Razgonov (Ukrainian: Микола Разгонов, Russian: Николай Разгонов; born 16 January 1964) is a retired Ukrainian sprinter who competed in the 200 metres for the Soviet Union. He is known for winning medals at the 1986 and 1988 European Indoor Championships. In addition, he took part in the 1987 World Indoor Championships.

== International competitions ==
Year	Competition	Venue	Position	Event	Notes
Representing the Soviet Union
1986	European Indoor Championships	Madrid, Spain	3rd	200 m	21.48
1986	Goodwill Games	Moscow, Soviet Union	7th	200 m	21.48
1987	European Indoor Championships	Liévin, France	4th (h)	200 m	20.82^{1}
1987	World Indoor Championships	Indianapolis, United States	7th (sf)	200 m	21.42
1988	European Indoor Championships	Budapest, Hungary	1st	200 m	20.62
1989	European Indoor Championships	The Hague, Netherlands	9th (sf)	200 m	21.59

^{1}Did not finish in the semifinals

== Personal bests ==
Outdoor

- 100 metres – 10.37 (+1.8 m/s, Bryansk 1987)
- 200 metres – 20.62 (+0.9 m/s, Kiev 1986)

Indoor

- 60 metres – 6.63 (Moscow 1988)
- 200 metres – 20.62 (Budapest 1988)
