= Bernard Petitbois =

Malagasy-born French athlete

Personal information
- Born: 19 July 1954 (age 71) Antananarivo, Madagascar
- Height: 1.81 m (5 ft 11 in)
- Weight: 67 kg (148 lb)

Sport
- Sport: Athletics
- Events: 100 m, 200 m
- Club: ES Montgeron
Medal record
Men's athletics
Representing France
European Indoor Championships
Bronze medal – third place	1982 Milan	60 m

Bernard Petitbois (born 19 July 1954 in Antananarivo) is a Malagasy-born French former athlete who specialised in sprinting events. He competed at the 1980 Summer Olympics. In addition, he won a bronze medal at the 1982 European Indoor Championships.

== International competitions ==
Year	Competition	Venue	Position	Event	Notes
Representing France
1976	European Indoor Championships	Munich, West Germany	10th (sf)	60 m	6.86
1978	European Indoor Championships	Milan, Italy	6th	60 m	6.84
1979	Mediterranean Games	Split, Yugoslavia	2nd	200 m	21.02
1979	Mediterranean Games	Split, Yugoslavia	2nd	4x100 m relay	39.98
1980	Olympic Games	Moscow, Soviet Union	24th (qf)	200 m	21.32
1982	European Indoor Championships	Milan, Italy	3rd	60 m	6.66
1982	European Championships	Athens, Greece	7th	100 m	10.50
1982	European Championships	Athens, Greece	7th	4x100 m relay	39.22

== Personal bests ==
Outdoor

- 100 metres – 10.40 (-0.1 m/s, Viry-Chatillon 1978)
- 200 metres – 20.82 (0.0 m/s, Les Abymes 1979)

Indoor

- 60 metres – 6.63 (Milan 1982)
