= 1976 European Athletics Indoor Championships – Men's 60 metres =

The men's 60 metres event at the 1976 European Athletics Indoor Championships was held on 21 February in Munich.

== Medalists ==
Gold	Silver	Bronze
Valeriy Borzov; Soviet Union	Vassilios Papageorgopoulos; Greece	Petar Petrov; Bulgaria

== Results ==
=== Heats ===
First 3 from each heat (Q) qualified directly for the semifinals.

Rank	Heat	Name	Nationality	Time	Notes
1	1	Nikolay Kolesnikov	Soviet Union	6.74	Q
2	3	Aleksandr Kornelyuk	Soviet Union	6.77	Q
3	1	Petar Petrov	Bulgaria	6.78	Q
4	1	Vassilios Papageorgopoulos	Greece	6.80	Q
5	1	Josep Carbonell	Spain	6.83	
5	2	Luis Sarría	Spain	6.83	Q
5	2	Zenon Nowosz	Poland	6.83	Q
5	3	Andrzej Świerczyński	Poland	6.83	Q
9	3	Bernard Petitbois	France	6.86	Q
10	3	László Lukács	Hungary	6.88	
10	4	Valeriy Borzov	Soviet Union	6.88	Q
12	2	Claudiu Suselescu	Romania	6.89	Q
13	2	Karl-Heinz Weisenseel	West Germany	6.90	
13	4	Ján Chebeň	Czechoslovakia	6.90	Q
15	2	Jean-Claude Amoureux	France	6.92	
16	4	Markku Perttula	Finland	6.98	Q
17	4	Serafim Liapis	Greece	6.99	
18	3	Gernot Massing	Austria	7.01	

=== Semifinals ===
First 3 from each heat (Q) qualified directly for the final.

Rank	Heat	Name	Nationality	Time	Notes
1	2	Aleksandr Kornelyuk	Soviet Union	6.69	Q
2	2	Petar Petrov	Bulgaria	6.71	Q
3	2	Valeriy Borzov	Soviet Union	6.72	Q
4	1	Vassilios Papageorgopoulos	Greece	6.74	Q
5	1	Nikolay Kolesnikov	Soviet Union	6.75	Q
6	2	Luis Sarría	Spain	6.78	
7	1	Zenon Nowosz	Poland	6.79	Q
7	2	Andrzej Świerczyński	Poland	6.79	
9	1	Claudiu Suselescu	Romania	6.84	
10	1	Bernard Petitbois	France	6.86	
11	1	Ján Chebeň	Czechoslovakia	6.87	
12	2	Markku Perttula	Finland	6.94	

=== Final ===
Rank	Lane	Name	Nationality	Time	Notes
1st place, gold medalist(s)	5	Valeriy Borzov	Soviet Union	6.58	=CR
2nd place, silver medalist(s)	4	Vassilios Papageorgopoulos	Greece	6.67	NR
3rd place, bronze medalist(s)	2	Petar Petrov	Bulgaria	6.68	
4	3	Nikolay Kolesnikov	Soviet Union	6.70	
5	1	Aleksandr Kornelyuk	Soviet Union	6.71	
6	6	Zenon Nowosz	Poland	6.79	
