= Arkadiusz Janiak =

Polish sprinter

Personal information
- Born: 3 October 1963 Kalisz, Poland
- Height: 1.73 m (5 ft 8 in)
- Weight: 68 kg (150 lb)

Sport
- Sport: Athletics
- Event(s): 100 m, 200m
- Club: MKS Kalisz (1978); Calisia (1979-83); Legia Warszawa

Arkadiusz Janiak (born 3 October 1963 in Kalisz) is a Polish former sprinter. He won a bronze medal at the 1984 Friendship Games which were organised for the countries boycotting the 1984 Summer Olympics.

== International competitions ==
Year	Competition	Venue	Position	Event	Notes
Representing Poland
1981	European Junior Championships	Utrecht, Netherlands	6th (sf)	100 m	10.50 (w)
1981	European Junior Championships	Utrecht, Netherlands	–	4 × 100 m relay	DQ
1982	European Championships	Athens, Greece	14th (sf)	100 m	10.66
1982	European Championships	Athens, Greece	5th	4 × 100 m relay	39.00
1983	European Indoor Championships	Budapest, Hungary	6th	60 m	6.70
1984	Friendship Games	Moscow, Soviet Union	4th	100 m	10.29
1984	Friendship Games	Moscow, Soviet Union	3rd	4 × 100 m relay	38.81
1985	European Indoor Championships	Piraeus, Greece	9th (sf)	60 m	6.70

== Personal bests ==
Outdoor

- 100 metres – 10.29 (-0.4 m/s, Moscow 1984)
- 200 metres – 20.75 (+1.9 m/s, Sopot 1984)

Indoor

- 60 metres – 6.66 (Budapest 1983)
