= East Germany national athletics team =

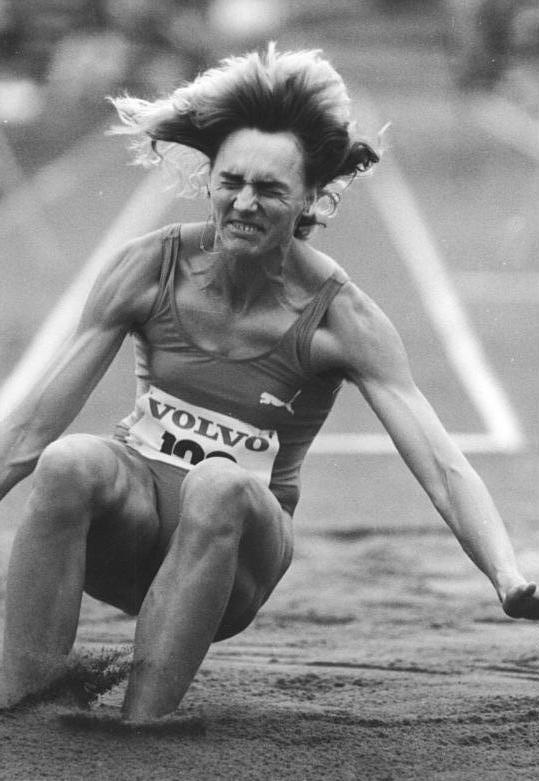
Heike Drechsler

The East Germany national athletics team represented East Germany at the international athletics competitions such as Olympic Games or World Athletics Championships.

== History ==
After the defeat in World War II, Germany was not invited to various events, and appeared at the Olympic Games for the first time in Helsinki 1952 and for the next three editions afterwards competed as one team, up to and including the 1964 Olympic Games in Tokyo. Germany’s first appearance at the European Championships after the war was in Bern 1954, and even before the construction of the Berlin Wall (1961-1989) at the European Championships competed as two separate teams (East Germany and West Germany), in the 1958 and 1962 Championships, and this continued up to 1990, for the last time at the European Championships in Split 1990).

== Medal count ==
East Germany has 5 participations in the Summer Olympic of 28 editions held from 1896 to 2016.

Competition	Medal table				Part.
Competition	1st place, gold medalist(s)	2nd place, silver medalist(s)	3rd place, bronze medalist(s)	Tot.	Part.
Summer Olympics	38	36	35	109	5
World Championships	19	18	15	52	2
European Championships	91	82	65	238	9
Total	148	136	115	399	

== See also ==
- East Germany at the Olympics
- German records in athletics
- Athletics Summer Olympics medal table
- World Championships medal table
- European Championships medal table
- Deutscher Leichtathletik-Verband
- Doping in East Germany
