= Roland Jokl =

Austrian sprinter

Personal information
- Born: 26 July 1962 (age 63)
- Height: 1.77 m (5 ft 10 in)
- Weight: 75 kg (165 lb)

Sport
- Sport: Athletics
- Events: 100 m, 200 m
- Club: ULC Weinland

Roland Jokl (born 26 July 1962) is an Austrian former athlete who specialised in sprinting events. He represented his country at the 1983 World Championships reaching the quarterfinals of the 200 metres. In addition, he finished fourth in the final at the 1984 European Indoor Championships.

== International competitions ==
Year	Competition	Venue	Position	Event	Notes
Representing Austria
1980	European Indoor Championships	Sindelfingen, West Germany	14th (h)	60 m	6.97
1981	European Indoor Championships	Grenoble, France	15th (h)	50 m	5.98
1981	European Junior Championships	Utrecht, Netherlands	6th	100 m	10.55 (w)
1981	European Junior Championships	Utrecht, Netherlands	12th (sf)	200 m	21.78 (w)
1982	European Indoor Championships	Milan, Italy	18th (h)	60 m	6.86
1982	European Indoor Championships	Milan, Italy	19th (h)	200 m	22.09
1983	European Indoor Championships	Budapest, Hungary	14th (h)	60 m	6.83
1983	European Indoor Championships	Budapest, Hungary	8th (sf)	200 m	21.40
1983	Universiade	Edmonton, Canada	12th (sf)	200 m	21.02
1983	World Championships	Helsinki, Finland	21st (qf)	200 m	21.24
1984	European Indoor Championships	Gothenburg, Sweden	4th	200 m	21.78
1985	European Indoor Championships	Piraeus, Greece	20th (h)	60 m	6.93
1985	European Indoor Championships	Piraeus, Greece	10th (sf)	200 m	21.67
1985	Universiade	Kobe, Japan	19th (qf)	100 m	10.77
1985	Universiade	Kobe, Japan	10th (sf)	200 m	21.39
1986	European Indoor Championships	Madrid, Spain	11th (h)	200 m	21.92

== Personal bests ==
Outdoor

- 100 metres – 10.44 (+1.0 m/s, Judenburg 1983)
- 200 metres – 20.61 (-0.7 m/s, Vienna 1983)
- 400 metres – 47.28 (Nanjing 1985)

Indoor

- 60 metres – 6.78 (Vienna 1983)
- 200 metres – 20.98 (Vienna 1984)
