= Piece, Pomeranian Voivodeship =

Village in Pomeranian Voivodeship, Poland

Piece
- Village
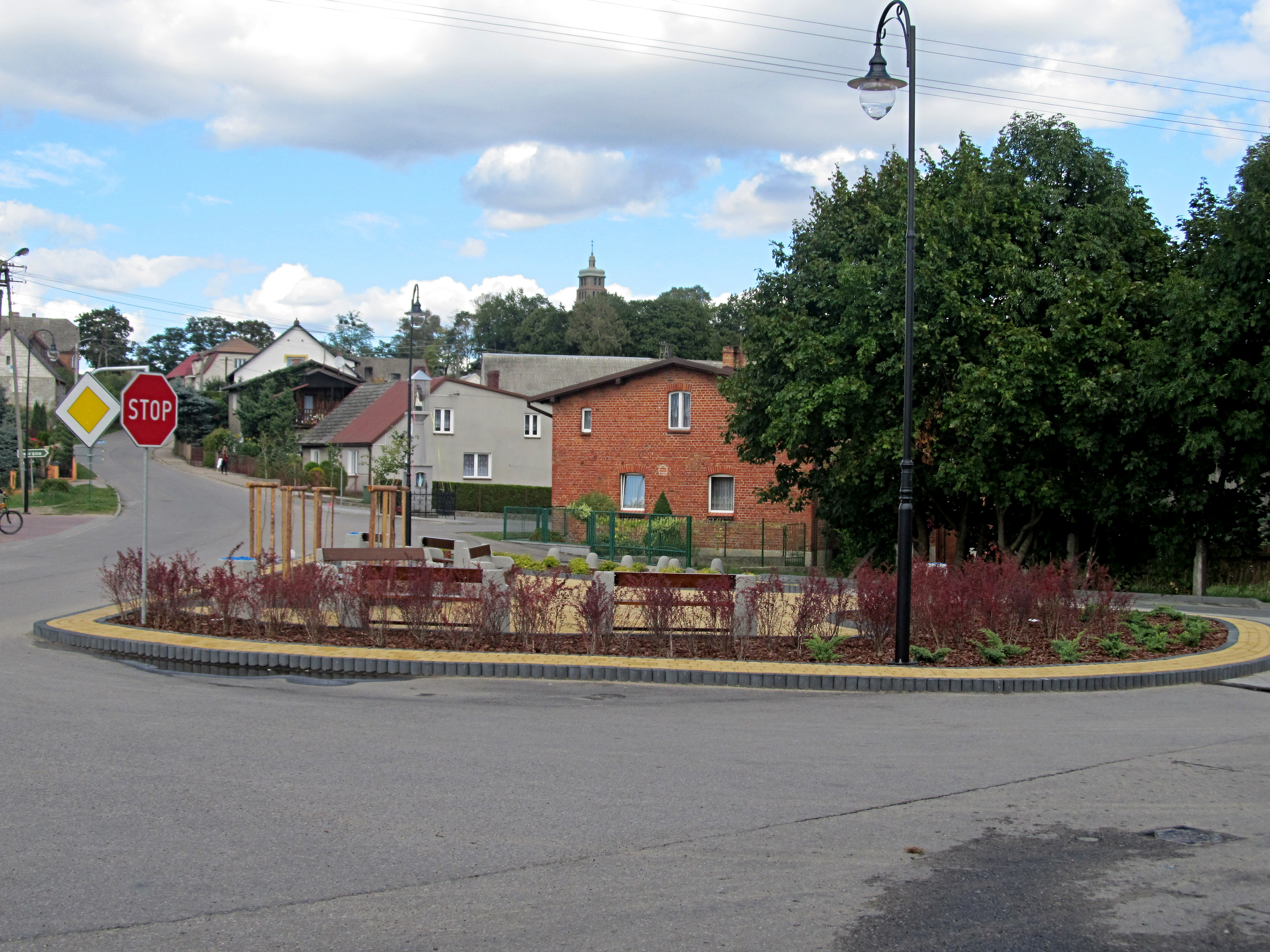
- Square in the village center

- Location within Poland
- Coordinates: 53°53′14″N 18°12′50″E
- Country: Poland
- Voivodeship: Pomeranian
- County: Starogard
- Gmina: Kaliska
- Highest elevation: 149 m (489 ft)
- Lowest elevation: 110 m (360 ft)
- Population: 902
- Time zone: UTC+1 (CET)
  - Summer (DST): UTC+2 (CEST)
- Vehicle registration: GST

Piece [ˈpjɛt͡sɛ] is a village in the administrative district of Gmina Kaliska, within Starogard County, Pomeranian Voivodeship, in northern Poland. It is located in the ethnocultural region of Kociewie in the historic region of Pomerania.

== History ==
During the German occupation of Poland (World War II), Piece was one of the sites of executions of Poles, carried out by the Germans in 1939 as part of the Intelligenzaktion. The local priest was murdered by the Germans in October 1939, during the large massacres of Poles carried out in the Forest of Szpęgawsk (see: Nazi persecution of the Catholic Church in Poland).
