= Christian Mark =

Austrian bobsledder (born 1962)

Personal information
- Born: 24 December 1962 (age 63) Innsbruck, Tyrol
Medal record
Men's bobsleigh
Representing Austria
WorldChampionships
Silver medal – second place	1986 Königssee	Four-man

Christian Mark (born 24 December 1962 in Innsbruck, Tyrol) is an Austrian bobsledder who won competed during the 1980s. He won a silver medal in the four-man event at the 1986 FIBT World Championships in Königssee.

Competing in two Winter Olympics, Mark earned his best finish of sixth in the four-man event at Calgary in 1988.
