= Jürgen Evers =

German sprinter

Medal record

Men's athletics

Representing West Germany

European Championships
Silver medal – second place	1986 Stuttgart	200 m

Jürgen Evers (born 29 April 1964 in Stuttgart, Baden-Württemberg) is a retired West German sprinter who specialized in the 200 metres.

He won the silver medal in 200 m at the 1986 European Championships.

In the 4 × 100 metres relay event he finished fifth at the 1983 World Championships and at the 1984 Summer Olympics.

His personal best time was 20.37 seconds, achieved in August 1983 in Schwechat. This ranks him fifth among German 200 m sprinters, behind Tobias Unger, Frank Emmelmann, Sebastian Ernst and Eugen Ray.

Jürgen Evers represented the sports team SV Salamander Kornwestheim.

== See also ==
- German all-time top lists - 200 metres
