= Norbert Dobeleit =

Personal information
- Born: 17 July 1964 (age 61) Renchen, Baden-Württemberg, West Germany
Medal record
Men's athletics
Representing West Germany
Olympic Games
Bronze medal – third place	1988 Seoul	4×400 m
European Championships
Silver medal – second place	1990 Split	4×400 m

Norbert Dobeleit (born 17 July 1964) is a German television personality and retired athlete. During his active career he represented West Germany and specialized in the 200 and 400 metres.

== Biography ==
Dobeleit was born in Renchen, Baden-Württemberg. At the 1987 World Championships he placed fifth in 4 × 100 metres relay and fourth in 4 × 400 metres relay. At the 1988 Summer Olympics held in Seoul, South Korea he helped win the 4 × 400 metres relay bronze medal with his teammates Edgar Itt, Jörg Vaihinger and Ralf Lübke.

He won the 400 m race at the 1990 European Indoor Championships, and at the 1990 European Championships he finished fifth in 400 m and second in 4 × 400 m relay with teammates Klaus Just, Edgar Itt and Carsten Köhrbrück.

His personal best time was 20.43 seconds, achieved in July 1987 in Rhede. This ranks him ninth among German 200 m sprinters, behind Tobias Unger, Frank Emmelmann, Sebastian Ernst, Eugen Ray, Jürgen Evers, Ralf Lübke, Bernhard Hoff and Hans-Joachim Zenk.

After retiring he has worked as a television presenter in the German media.

Norbert Dobeleit was married to Swiss television presenter Tamara Sedmak and they have a son named Julius, born in June 2011. They are now separated.
