= Nikolay Markov (sprinter) =

Bulgarian sprinter

Nikolay Markov (Bulgarian: Николай Марков; born June 9, 1960) is a retired Bulgarian sprinter who specialized in the 200 metres.

At the 1982 European Championships he finished eighth in the 4 x 100 metres relay together with Ivaylo Karanyotov, Petar Petrov and Ivan Tuparov. He became Bulgarian 200 metres champion in 1986, and also won the 1986 Balkan Championships.
