= Petar Petrov (sprinter) =

Bulgarian sprinter (born 1955)

Personal information
- Born: 17 February 1955 (age 71) Svishtov, Veliko Tarnovo, Bulgaria

Sport
- Sport: Track and field
Medal record
Representing Bulgaria
Olympic Games
Bronze medal – third place	1980 Moscow	100 m
European Indoor Championships
Silver medal – second place	1978 Milan	60 m
Bronze medal – third place	1976 Munich	60 m
Bronze medal – third place	1979 Vienna	60 m
Summer Universiade
Silver medal – second place	1977 Sofia	100 m

Petar Nikolov Petrov (Bulgarian: Петър Петров; born 17 February 1955) is a retired Bulgarian sprinter who specialized in the 100 metres. His personal best time was 10.13 seconds, achieved at the 1980 Olympics. This is the Bulgarian record.

== Achievements ==
In 1973, Petrov won two European Junior silver medals in the 100 and 200 metres, and was the semifinalist in the European Athletics Cup in 1977 and 1979. He also won three medals at the European Indoor Championships, a silver medal at the 1977 Summer Universiade, and seven Balkan Games titles.

In the 1976 Summer Olympic Games, Petrov ranked eighth as a finalist in the 100 meters relay. During the 1980 Olympic Games, he won the bronze medal in the 100 meters relay, finishing behind Allan Wells and Silvio Leonard. In the same year, he also ranked sixth in the 4 × 100 m relay games with Vladimir Ivanov, Ivaylo Karanyotov and Pavel Pavlov, and finished in the quarterfinals of the 200 meters relay game.

Perlov's additional accolades include finishing eighth in the 1982 European Athletics Championships' 4 × 100 meters relay with Karanyotov, Nikolay Markov and Ivan Tuparov, and winning nine outdoor Bulgarian sprint titles and five indoor 60 meters titles on a domestic level.

Year	Competition	Venue	Position	Notes
1976	European Indoor Championships	Munich, West Germany	3rd	60 metres
1977	Universiade	Sofia, Bulgaria	2nd	100 metres
1978	European Indoor Championships	Milan, Italy	2nd	60 metres
1978	European Championships	Prague, Czechoslovakia	4th	100 metres
1979	European Indoor Championships	Vienna, Austria	3rd	60 metres
1980	Olympic Games	Moscow, USSR	3rd	100 metres
