= Donovan Reid =

English athlete

Personal information
- Nationality: British (English)
- Born: 31 August 1963 (age 62) London, England
- Height: 177 cm (5 ft 10 in)
- Weight: 73 kg (161 lb)

Sport
- Sport: Athletics
- Event: Sprinting
- Club: Shaftesbury Barnet Harriers

Donovan Reid (born 31 August 1963) is a male British retired sprinter who competed at the 1984 Summer Olympics.

== Biography ==
Reid represented England in the 200 metres and 4 x 100 metres relay events, at the 1982 Commonwealth Games in Brisbane, Australia.

Reid became the British 100 metres champion after winning the British AAA Championships title at the 1984 AAA Championships, defeating Linford Christie into second place.

Reid competed in the men's 100 metres at the 1984 Summer Olympics in Los Angeles.
