= Anri Grigorov =

Bulgarian sprinter

Personal information
- Born: 18 October 1964 (age 61) Sofia, Bulgaria

Sport
- Sport: Track and field

Anri Grigorov (Bulgarian: Анри Григоров) (born 18 October 1964) is a retired Bulgarian sprinter who specialized in the 100 metres.

He finished eighth at the 1989 European Indoor Championships.

His personal best time was 10.23 seconds, achieved 7 June 1987 in Sofia. This ranks him third among Bulgarian 100 metres sprinters, only behind Petar Petrov and Valentin Atanasov.
