= Ferenc Kiss (athlete) =

Hungarian sprinter (1955–2010)

Ferenc Kiss (10 February 1955 – 25 August 2010) was a Hungarian sprinter who competed in the 100/200 metres. In 1980 he was the Hungarian 100 metres champion. He went to the 1980 Summer Olympics in Moscow where he competed in the 200 metres, reaching the semi-finals before he was eliminated. He won the Hungarian 200 metres in 1981, as well as the indoor 60 metre title also. In 1983 he added an indoor Hungarian 200 also. He was born in Mosonmagyaróvár, Győr-Moson-Sopron.
