= German Athletics Association =

Governing body for the sport of athletics in Germany

- Deutscher Leichtathletik-Verband
- Sport: Athletics
- Jurisdiction: national
- Abbreviation: DLV
- Founded: 29 January 1898; 128 years ago
- Affiliation: World Athletics
- Regional affiliation: European Athletics
- Headquarters: Darmstadt

Official website
- www.leichtathletik.de
- (Germany)

The German Athletics Association (German: Deutscher Leichtathletik-Verband; DLV) is the governing body for the sport of athletics in Germany.

Since 2010, Germany's kits are supplied by Nike.

View source data.
View source data.

== See also ==
- German Athletics Championships
- East Germany national athletics team
