= Giovanni Grazioli =

Italian sprinter

Personal information
- Nationality: Italian
- Born: 9 March 1959 (age 67) Robbio, Italy

Sport
- Country: Italy
- Sport: Athletics
- Event: Sprint

Achievements and titles
- Personal bests: 100 m: 10.38 (1979); 200 m: 21.35 (1979)
Medal record
Summer Universiade
Gold medal – first place	1979 Mexico City	4x100 m
Mediterranean Games
Gold medal – first place	1979 Split	4x100 m

Giovanni Grazioli (Robbio, 9 March 1959) is an Italian sprinter.

His best result at the international individual level was the 5th place, in the 60 metres final, at the 1978 European Athletics Indoor Championships held in Milan.

== Biography ==
He is the husband of former Italian hurdlers Simona Parmiggiani, and the coach of Italian sprinter Diego Marani.

== Achievements ==
Year	Competition	Venue	Position	Event	Performance	Notes
1978	European Indoor Championships	(Italy) Milan	5th	60 m	6.76	
1979	Mediterranean Games	(Socialist Federal Republic of Yugoslavia) Split	1st	4 × 100 m relay	39.27	
1979	Universiade	Mexico City	1st	4 × 100 m relay	38.42	

== National titles ==
- 2 wins in 60 metres at the Italian Athletics Indoor Championships (1982, 1983)
