= Steffen Bringmann =

East German sprinter (born 1964)

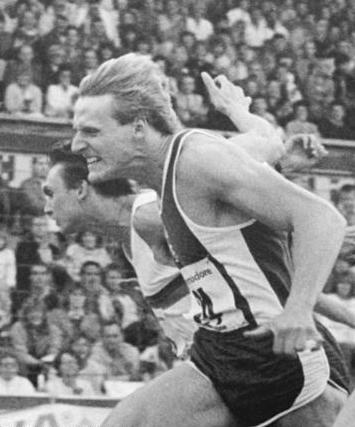
- Bringmann in 1988

Medal record

Men's athletics

Representing East Germany

European Championships
Silver medal – second place	1986 Stuttgart	100 m
Silver medal – second place	1986 Stuttgart	4×100 m

Steffen Bringmann (born 11 March 1964 in Leipzig) is a retired East German sprinter who specialized in the 100 metres.

== Biography ==
At the 1986 European Championships he won silver medals in the 100 metres and in the 4 × 100 metres relay, the latter with teammates Thomas Schröder, Olaf Prenzler and Frank Emmelmann. He had already won the silver medal in the 60 metres at the European Indoor Championships the same year. He became East German champion in 1987 and 1989 and German champion in 1991 and 1992.

His personal best time was 10.13 seconds, achieved in June 1986 in Jena. This ranks him sixth among German 100 m sprinters, behind Julian Reus, Frank Emmelmann, Thomas Schröder, Sven Matthes and Eugen Ray.

== See also ==
- German all-time top lists - 100 metres
