= István Tatár =

Hungarian sprinter

István Tatár (24 March 1958 – 2 January 2017 in Eger) was a Hungarian sprinter. He competed in the 4 × 100 metres relay and the 100 meters at the 1980 and 1988 Summer Olympics.
