= Thomas Schröder =

East German sprinter (born 1962)

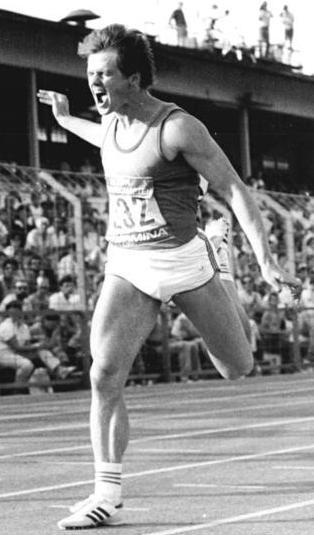
- Schröder in 1986

Medal record

Men's athletics

Representing East Germany

European Championships
Silver medal – second place	1986 Stuttgart	4×100 m

Thomas Schröder (born 23 August 1962 in Waren, Bezirk Neubrandenburg) is a retired East German sprinter who specialized in the 100 and 200 metres.

== Biography ==
He won the 100 m at the 1979 European Junior Championships, and at the following European Junior Championships in 1981 he won gold medals in both 100 m, 200 m and 4 × 100 metres relay.

He competed at the 1982 European Championships and the 1983 World Championships, without reaching the finals, although the 1983 World Championships relay team (Andreas Knebel, Thomas Schröder, Jens Hubler, Frank Emmelmann) finished fourth in the final. At the 1986 European Championships he finished fourth in both the 100 metres and the 200 metres, while in the 4 × 100 metres relay he won a silver medal with teammates Steffen Bringmann, Olaf Prenzler and Frank Emmelmann.

Schröder represented the sports team SC Neubrandenburg and became East German 100 m champion in 1983, 1984 and 1986 and 200 m champion in 1986.

His personal best time over 100 m was 10.10 seconds, achieved in June 1986 in Jena. This ranks him third among German 100 m sprinters, behind Julian Reus with 10.01 seconds in 2016 and Frank Emmelmann who ran 10.06 seconds in 1985.

== See also ==
- German all-time top lists - 100 metres
