= Tommy Johansson (sprinter) =

Swedish athlete

Personal information
- Nationality: Swedish
- Born: 3 October 1958 (age 67)

Sport
- Sport: Sprinting
- Event: 400 metres

Lauri Tommy Björn Stig Johansson (born 3 October 1958) is a Swedish sprinter and bobsledder. He competed in the men's 400 metres at the 1984 Summer Olympics. He also competed in the four-man bobsleigh at the 1984 Winter Olympics.

As an athlete, Johansson represented IF Göta, and as bobsledder, he represented Djurgårdens IF.

== See also ==
- List of athletes who competed in both the Summer and Winter Olympic games
