= Kenth Rönn =

Swedish bobsledder

Personal information
- Nationality: Swedish
- Born: 14 November 1953 (age 71); Uppsala, Sweden

Sport
- Sport: Bobsleigh

Kenth Reinert Rönn (born 14 November 1953) is a Swedish bobsledder. He competed at the 1976 Winter Olympics and the 1980 Winter Olympics.

Rönn represented Djurgårdens IF.
