= Christian Haas (sprinter) =

German sprinter

Medal record

Men's athletics

Representing West Germany

European Championships
Bronze medal – third place	1982 Athens	4×100 m

European Indoor Championships
Silver medal – second place	1980 Sindelfingen	60 m

Christian Haas (born 22 August 1958, in Nuremberg, Bavaria, West Germany) is a retired West German sprinter who specialized in the 100 metres.

== Biography ==
Haas was West Germany's 100 metre champion in 1980–83 and 1985–87. He added the West German 200 metre titles also in 1980, and '87. He also won the West German indoor 60 metres titles in 1981–88. At the 1982 European Championships he reached the semi-final of the 100 metres but went on and helped win the bronze medal in the 4 × 100 metres relay with teammates Christian Zirkelbach, Peter Klein and Erwin Skamrahl.

At the 1983 World Championships he finished sixth in 100 metres final and fifth in the 4 × 100 metres relay final. He was European indoor 60 metre champion in 1984, this was followed by the Los Angeles Olympics where he failed to pass the opening rounds of the 100 metres.

He ran at the European Championships in Stuttgart in 1986, where he reached the 100 metre semi-final. He then finished fifth at the 1987 World Championships and sixth at the 1988 Summer Olympics, both times in the relay.

His personal best time was 10.16 seconds, achieved in June 1983 in Bremen. This ranks him eleventh among German 100 m sprinters, behind Julien Reus, Frank Emmelmann, Thomas Schröder, Sven Matthes, Eugen Ray, Steffen Bringmann, Marc Blume and Alexander Kosenkow.

His P.B. in the 200 m was 20.46. Christian Haas represented the sports team LAC Quelle Fürth. He is the son of Olympic medalist Karl-Friedrich Haas and European Championships medalist Maria Haas.

== See also ==
- German all-time top lists - 100 metres
