= Antonio Ullo =

Italian sprinter

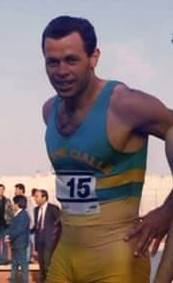

Personal information
- Nationality: Italian
- Born: January 7, 1963 (age 63) Milazzo, Italy
- Height: 1.80 m (5 ft 11 in)
- Weight: 80 kg (176 lb)

Sport
- Country: Italy
- Sport: Athletics
- Event: Sprint
- Club: G.S. Fiamme Gialle

Achievements and titles
- Personal bests: 100 m: 10.36 (1984); 60 m indoor: 6.59 (1985)
Medal record
Event	1st	2nd	3rd
European Indoor Championships	0	1	1
European Cup	2	0	0
Total	2	1	1
European Cup
Bronze medal – third place	1985 Moscow	4×100 metres relay

Antonio Ullo (born 7 January 1963) is a former Italian sprinter who specialized in the 60 metres.

== Biography ==
Antonio Ullo won four medals at the International athletics competitions, two of these with the national relay team, and he was 4th with the relay team at 1984 Summer Olympics. He has 30 caps in national team from 1983 to 1991. His personal best 100 metres time is 10.36 seconds, achieved in the heats of the 1984 Olympics. His personal best 200 metres time is 20.99 seconds, achieved in May 1987 in Potenza.

== Achievements ==
Year	Competition	Venue	Position	Event	Notes
1984	European Indoor Championships	Gothenburg, Sweden	2nd	60 m	
1984	Olympic Games	Los Angeles, United States	4th	4 × 400 m relay	
1985	European Indoor Championships	Piraeus, Greece	4th	60 m	
1987	World Indoor Championships	Indianapolis, United States	4th	60 m	
1987	European Indoor Championships	Liévin, France	3rd	60 m	
1988	European Indoor Championships	Budapest, Hungary	6th	60 m	
1989	World Indoor Championships	Budapest, Hungary	4th	60 m	
1989	European Indoor Championships	The Hague, Netherlands	6th	60 m	

== See also ==
- Italy national relay team
