= Valentin Atanasov =

Bulgarian sprinter (born 1961)

Medal record

Men's athletics

Representing Bulgaria

European Indoor Championships
Silver medal – second place	1982 Milan	60 m

Valentin Atanasov (Bulgarian: Валентин Атанасов, born 7 May 1961) in Kjustendil, Bulgaria is a retired Bulgarian sprinter who specialized in the 100 metres. He won three medals at the European Indoor Championships.

His personal best time was 10.15 seconds, achieved in August 1982 in Sofia. This ranks him second among Bulgarian 100 metres sprinters, only behind Petar Petrov.

He also competed in the bobsleigh at the 1992 Winter Olympics and the 1994 Winter Olympics.

== International competitions ==
Representing Bulgaria
Year	Competition	Venue	Position	Event	Result	Notes
1982	European Indoor Championships	Milan, Italy	2nd	60 metres		
1983	European Indoor Championships	Budapest, Hungary	3rd	60 metres		
1987	European Indoor Championships	Liévin, France	5th	60 metres		
1988	European Indoor Championships	Budapest, Hungary	3rd	60 metres		
