= Aleksandr Yevgenyev =

Soviet sprinter

Medal record

Men's athletics

Representing Soviet Union

European Championships
Gold medal – first place	1986 Stuttgart	4×100 m

Aleksandr Anatolyevich Yevgenyev (Russian: Александр Анатольевич Евгеньев), Aleksandr Yevgenyev; born July 20, 1961, is a former Soviet 200 metre sprinter. His achievements include:

- Soviet Union 200 metre champion (1985 and 1986)
- National indoor 200 metres champion (1984 and 1986)
- Member of the team that won the sprint relay at the European Cup (1985)
- European indoor champion in the 200 m (1983 and 1984) and placing in 1985 and 1986.
