= Ronald Desruelles =

Belgian long jumper and sprinter (1955-2015)

Personal information
- Nationality: Belgian
- Born: 14 February 1955 Antwerp, Belgium
- Died: 1 November 2015 (aged 60) Patong, Thailand
- Height: 186 cm (6 ft 1 in)
- Weight: 81 kg (179 lb)

Sport
- Sport: Athletics
- Events: Sprints, long jump
- Club: Vlierzele Sportief
Medal record
Men's athletics
Representing Belgium
European Indoor Championships
Silver medal – second place	1978 Milan	Long jump

Ronald Desruelles (14 February 1955 – 1 November 2015) was a Belgian track and field athlete who competed at the 1976 Summer Olympics and the 1984 Summer Olympics.

== Biography ==
Desruelles was born in Antwerp and his brother Patrick Desruelles competed in the men's pole vault. Ronald started as a long jumper, and achieved a personal best of 8.08 in 1979, a national record that stood for 17 years. Additionally in 1979, he won the British AAA Championships title at the 1979 AAA Championships.

He then concentrated on the short sprints, and won numerous medals in 60 metres. With 6.57 seconds in 1986 he was ranked third on the indoor top performers list that season. He lost a gold medal at the 1980 European Indoor Championships because of a doping offense. Desruelles won the Belgian 100 metres championships seven times. He also won the 200 in 1985. In the 1986 European championships in Stuttgart he reached the 100 m semi-final.

Ronald was found dead in a hotel in Thailand on 1 November 2015, having committed suicide after the failure of his business.

== Achievements ==
Year	Competition	Venue	Position	Event	Notes
Representing Belgium
1976	Olympic Games	Montreal, Canada	17th (q)	Long jump	7.60 m
1978	European Indoor Championships	Milan, Italy	2nd	Long jump	7.75 m
1980	European Indoor Championships	Sindelfingen, Germany	disqualified	Long jump	~~8.08 m~~
1984	European Indoor Championships	Gothenburg, Sweden	3rd	60 m	6.69
1984	Olympic Games	Los Angeles, United States	17th (h)	100 m	10.46
1985	World Indoor Games	Paris, France	3rd	60 m	6.64
1985	European Indoor Championships	Piraeus, Greece	3rd	60 m	6.68
1986	European Indoor Championships	Madrid, Spain	1st	60 m	6.61
1986	European Championships	Stuttgart, Germany	13th (sf)	100 m	10.43
1987	World Indoor Championships	Indianapolis, United States	6th	60 m	6.67
1987	World Championships	Rome, Italy	30th (qf)	100 m	10.69
1988	European Indoor Championships	Budapest, Hungary	2nd	60 m	6.60
(#) Indicates overall position in qualifying round (q) qualifying heats (h) quarterfinals (qf) or semifinals (sf)

Notes:

- Desruelles was the original winner of the long jump at the 1980 European Indoor Championship before being disqualified for a doping violation.
- Desruelles won his first round heat at the 1984 Olympics but withdrew from the second round.
