= 1979 European Cup "A" Final =

These are the full results of the 1979 European Cup "A" Final in athletics which was held at the Stadion Maksimir on 4 and 5 August 1979 in Turin, Italy.

== Team standings ==
Men
Pos.	Nation	Points
1	East Germany	125
2	Soviet Union	114
3	West Germany	110
4	Poland	90
5	Great Britain	82
6	Italy	79
7	France	70.5
8	Yugoslavia	49.5

Women
Pos.	Nation	Points
1	East Germany	102
2	Soviet Union	100
3	Bulgaria	76
4	Great Britain	62
5	Romania	58
	West Germany	58
7	Poland	55
8	Italy	29

== Men's results ==
=== 100 metres ===
4 August
Wind: +1.3 m/s

Rank	Lane	Name	Nationality	Time	Notes	Points
1	5	Pietro Mennea	Italy	10.15	NR	8
2	8	Marian Woronin	Poland	10.16	NR	7
3	7	Allan Wells	Great Britain	10.19		6
4	2	Eugen Ray	East Germany	10.39		5
5	1	Philippe Le Joncour	France	10.44		4
6	3	Fritz-Werner Heer	West Germany	10.45		3
7	4	Andrey Shlyapnikov	Soviet Union	10.46		2
8	6	Dragan Zarić	Yugoslavia	10.70		1

=== 200 metres ===
5 August
Wind: +2.2 m/s

Rank	Lane	Name	Nationality	Time	Notes	Points
1	8	Allan Wells	Great Britain	20.29		8
2	7	Pietro Mennea	Italy	20.31		7
3	1	Marian Woronin	Poland	20.43		6
4	3	Olaf Prenzler	East Germany	20.53		5
5	2	Pascal Barré	France	20.64		4
6	4	Franz-Peter Hofmeister	West Germany	20.68		3
7	5	Viktor Burakov	Soviet Union	20.98		2
8	6	Dragan Zarić	Yugoslavia	21.29		1

=== 400 metres ===
4 August

Rank	Name	Nationality	Time	Notes	Points
1	Harald Schmid	West Germany	45.31		8
2	Nikolay Chernetskiy	Soviet Union	45.70	NR	7
3	Ryszard Podlas	Poland	46.11		6
4	Udo Bauer	East Germany	46.15		5
5	Francis Demarthon	France	46.33		4
6	Josip Alebić	Yugoslavia	46.54		3
7	Steve Wymark	Great Britain	46.66		2
8	Flavio Borghi	Italy	47.42		1

=== 800 metres ===
5 August

Rank	Name	Nationality	Time	Notes	Points
1	Sebastian Coe	Great Britain	1:47.28		8
2	Dragan Životić	Yugoslavia	1:48.03		7
3	Willi Wülbeck	West Germany	1:48.11		6
4	Anatoliy Reshetnyak	Soviet Union	1:48.18		5
5	Olaf Beyer	East Germany	1:48.35		4
6	Roger Milhau	France	1:48.70		3
7	Carlo Grippo	Italy	1:49.47		2
8	Andrzej Baron	Poland	1:50.20		1

=== 1500 metres ===
4 August

Rank	Name	Nationality	Time	Notes	Points
1	Jürgen Straub	East Germany	3:36.27	CR	8
2	Thomas Wessinghage	West Germany	3:36.40		7
3	Graham Williamson	Great Britain	3:38.34		6
4	Valeriy Abramov	Soviet Union	3:38.48		5
5	Vittorio Fontanella	Italy	3:39.66		4
6	Bogusław Mamiński	Poland	3:40.62		3
7	Philippe Dien	France	3:44.12		2
8	Dragan Zdravković	Yugoslavia	3:46.45		1

=== 5000 metres ===
5 August

Rank	Name	Nationality	Time	Notes	Points
1	Hansjörg Kunze	East Germany	14:12.88		8
2	Aleksandr Fedotkin	Soviet Union	14:13.97		7
3	Mike McLeod	Great Britain	14:15.91		6
4	Jerzy Kowol	Poland	14:16.27		5
5	Francis Gonzalez	France	14:16.89		4
6	Karl Fleschen	West Germany	14:18.80		3
7	Antonio Selvaggio	Italy	14:19.89		2
8	Stanko Lisec	Yugoslavia	14:32.35		1

=== 10,000 metres ===
4 August

Rank	Name	Nationality	Time	Notes	Points
1	Brendan Foster	Great Britain	28:22.86		8
2	Aleksandras Antipovas	Soviet Union	28:40.32		7
3	Frank Zimmermann	West Germany	28:42.09		6
4	Werner Schildhauer	East Germany	28:57.68		5
5	Ryszard Kopijasz	Poland	29:23.78		4
6	Luigi Zarcone	Italy	29:41.53		3
7	Radhouane Bouster	France	30:20.99		2
8	Dušan Janićijević	Yugoslavia	30:51.45		1

=== 110 metres hurdles ===
5 August
Wind: +1.3 m/s

Rank	Lane	Name	Nationality	Time	Notes	Points
1	6	Thomas Munkelt	East Germany	13.47		8
2	8	Aleksandr Puchkov	Soviet Union	13.56		7
3	4	Jan Pusty	Poland	13.74		6
4	3	Mark Holtom	Great Britain	13.91		5
5	1	Giuseppe Buttari	Italy	13.94		4
6	7	Dieter Gebhard	West Germany	13.94		3
7	2	Borislav Pisić	Yugoslavia	13.98		2
8	5	Emile Raybois	France	14.15		1

=== 400 metres hurdles ===
4 August

Rank	Lane	Name	Nationality	Time	Notes	Points
1	8	Harald Schmid	West Germany	47.85	AR	8
2	1	Vasiliy Arkhipenko	Soviet Union	48.34	NR	7
3	7	Volker Beck	East Germany	48.58	NR	6
4	3	Rok Kopitar	Yugoslavia	50.20		5
5	4	Gary Oakes	Great Britain	50.83		4
6	2	Fulvio Zorn	Italy	51.20		3
7	5	Leszek Rzepakowski	Poland	51.36		2
8	6	Jean-Claude Curtil	France	53.16		1

=== 3000 metres steeplechase ===
5 August

Rank	Name	Nationality	Time	Notes	Points
1	Mariano Scartezzini	Italy	8:22.74		8
2	Michael Karst	West Germany	8:23.75		7
3	Anatoliy Dimov	Soviet Union	8:25.87		6
4	Krzysztof Wesołowski	Poland	8:30.66		5
5	Hagen Melzer	East Germany	8:34.15		4
6	Jean-Luc Lemire	France	8:35.64		3
7	Petar Svet	Yugoslavia	8:46.95		2
8	Julian Marsay	Great Britain	8:55.89		1

=== 4 × 100 metres relay ===
4 August

Rank	Nation	Athletes	Time	Note	Points
1	Poland	Krzysztof Zwoliński, Leszek Dunecki, Zenon Licznerski, Marian Woronin	38.47	CR, NR	8
2	East Germany	Klaus-Dieter Kurrat, Alexander Thieme, Olaf Prenzler, Eugen Ray	38.70		7
3	France	Patrick Barré, Lucien Sainte-Rose, Pascal Barré, Herman Panzo	38.71		6
4	Italy	Gianfranco Lazzer, Mauro Zuliani, Luciano Caravani, Pietro Mennea	38.73	NR	5
5	Great Britain	Allan Wells, Steve Green, Trevor Hoyte, Drew McMaster	38.95	NR	4
6	West Germany	Fritz-Werner Heer, Dieter Gebhard, Ulrich Haupt, Franz-Peter Hofmeister	38.98		3
7	Soviet Union	Andrey Prokofyev, Aleksandr Aksinin, Nikolay Kolesnikov, Andrey Shlyapnikov	38.99		2
8	Yugoslavia	Janez Sagadin, Aleksandar Popović, Dragan Zarić, Nenad Milinkov	40.33		1

=== 4 × 400 metres relay ===
5 August

Rank	Nation	Athletes	Time	Note	Points
1	West Germany	Lothar Krieg, Franz-Peter Hofrmeister, Hartmut Weber, Harald Schmid	3:01.91		8
2	East Germany	Udo Bauer, Frank Schaffer, Frank Richter, Volker Beck	3:02.16	NR	7
3	Soviet Union	Viktor Burakov, Remigius Valyulis, Vyacheslav Dotsenko, Nikolay Chernetskiy	3:02.35	NR	6
4	Poland	Andrzej Stępień, Jerzy Pietrzyk, Zbigniew Jaremski, Ryszard Podlas	3:03.04		5
5	France	Didier Dubois, Robert Froissard, Gérard Boutier, Francis Demarthon	3:04.89		4
6	Great Britain	Steve Wymark, Steve Scutt, Alan Bell, Sebastian Coe	3:05.63		3
7	Yugoslavia	Željko Knapić, Milovan Savić, Dragan Životić, Josip Alebić	3:05.72		2
8	Italy	Roberto Tozzi, Stefano Malinverni, Flavio Borghi, Angelo Bianchi	3:06.01		1

=== High jump ===
4 August

Rank	Name	Nationality	Result	Notes	Points
1	Dietmar Mögenburg	West Germany	2.32	CR, NR	8
2	Rolf Beilschmidt	East Germany	2.30		7
3	Aleksandr Grigoryev	Soviet Union	2.24		6
4	Massimo Di Giorgio	Italy	2.24		5
5	Janusz Trzepizur	Poland	2.20		4
6	Franck Bonnet	France	2.14		3
7	Danial Temim	Yugoslavia	2.14		2
8	Tim Foulger	Great Britain	2.08		1

=== Pole vault ===
5 August

Rank	Name	Nationality	Result	Notes	Points
1	Konstantin Volkov	Soviet Union	5.60	WJR	8
2	Patrick Abada	France	5.60		7
3	Władysław Kozakiewicz	Poland	5.55		6
4	Günther Lohre	West Germany	5.50		5
5	Brian Hooper	Great Britain	5.30		4
6	Axel Weber	East Germany	5.30		3
7	Domenico D'Alisera	Italy	5.20		2
8	Miran Bizjak	Yugoslavia	4.80		1

=== Long jump ===
4 August

Rank	Name	Nationality	#1	#2	#3	#4	#5	#6	Result	Notes	Points
1	Lutz Dombrowski	East Germany	x	8.17	8.25	x	7.96	8.31	8.31	CR, NR	8
2	Grzegorz Cybulski	Poland	7.74	7.60	8.03	7.76	7.67	7.72	8.03		7
3	Valeriy Podluzhniy	Soviet Union	7.91	7.78	7.83	7.95	x	7.90	7.95		6
4	Nenad Stekić	Yugoslavia	7.75	7.61	7.75	7.80	7.90	7.85	7.90		5
5	Philippe Deroche	France	7.80	7.59	7.63	7.35	x	x	7.80		4
6	Carlo Arrighi	Italy	7.43	7.44	7.15	7.47	7.78	6.16	7.78		3
7	Jochen Verschl	West Germany	7.60	7.50	7.74	7.34	x	7.76	7.76		2
8	Roy Mitchell	Great Britain	7.41	7.36	7.58	7.36	5.91	x	7.58		1

=== Triple jump ===
5 August

Rank	Name	Nationality	#1	#2	#3	#4	#5	#6	Result	Notes	Points
1	Bernard Lamitié	France	16.77	x	16.94	x	16.47	16.73	16.94	NR	8
2	Roberto Mazzucato	Italy	16.78	x	16.69	16.34	16.35	16.92	16.92		7
3	Anatoliy Piskulin	Soviet Union	16.67	x	16.21	x	16.91	16.89	16.91		6
4	Lothar Gora	East Germany	16.65	16.76	x	16.64	14.68	x	16.76		5
5	Milan Spasojević	Yugoslavia	x	16.10	16.67	x	x	?	16.67		4
6	Aston Moore	Great Britain	x	16.60	14.42	x	14.89	15.97	16.60		3
7	Eugeniusz Biskupski	Poland	16.43	16.34	16.45	x	16.53	x	16.53		2
8	Douglas Henderson	West Germany	16.40	x	x	x	13.40	15.60	16.40		1

=== Shot put ===
4 August

Rank	Name	Nationality	#1	#2	#3	#4	#5	#6	Result	Notes	Points
1	Udo Beyer	East Germany	20.78	21.13	21.12	20.59	20.81	21.01	21.13		8
2	Ralf Reichenbach	West Germany	19.20	x	20.27	19.22	x	–	20.27		7
3	Aleksandr Baryshnikov	Soviet Union	19.14	19.77	x	20.25	19.29	19.90	20.25		6
4	Vladimir Milić	Yugoslavia	19.78	19.38	19.75	x	x	19.87	19.87		5
5	Geoff Capes	Great Britain	18.08	19.61	19.67	19.45	19.75	x	19.75		4
6	Angelo Groppelli	Italy	18.70	18.82	19.46	x	x	19.04	19.46		3
7	Władysław Komar	Poland	18.50	x	18.22	x	–	–	18.50		2
8	Arnjolt Beer	France	18.04	18.05	18.13	18.14	18.04	x	18.14		1

=== Discus throw ===
5 August

Rank	Name	Nationality	#1	#2	#3	#4	#5	#6	Result	Notes	Points
1	Wolfgang Schmidt	East Germany	59.10	66.76	63.34	x	64.10	x	66.76		8
2	Alwin Wagner	West Germany	x	x	58.82	62.96	x	61.58	62.96		7
3	Igor Duginyets	Soviet Union	62.72	x	60.18	61.06	x	60.66	62.72		6
4	Armando De Vincentiis	Italy	57.28	60.14	60.48	59.86	60.32	58.84	60.48		5
5	Stanisław Wołodko	Poland	59.70	x	58.12	55.52	54.02	56.26	59.70		4
6	Frédéric Piette	France	54.76	55.88	56.26	?	54.02	55.52	56.26		3
7	Richard Slaney	Great Britain							55.42		2
8	Dmitar Marčeta	Yugoslavia	52.74	49.08	50.68	x	x	50.02	52.74		1

=== Hammer throw ===
4 August

Rank	Name	Nationality	#1	#2	#3	#4	#5	#6	Result	Notes	Points
1	Karl-Hans Riehm	West Germany	78.08	78.66	77.46	77.28	77.04	76.10	78.66		8
2	Sergey Litvinov	Soviet Union	x	73.68	x	74.46	76.90	73.90	76.90		7
3	Roland Steuk	East Germany	72.98	73.88	x	x	75.76	x	75.76		6
4	Giampaolo Urlando	Italy	x	72.22	x	72.08	x	x	72.22		5
5	Ireneusz Golda	Poland	69.62	70.16	71.14	x	71.96	72.14	72.14		4
6	Jacques Accambray	France	63.52	x	x	x	65.46	67.24	67.24		3
7	Srećko Štiglić	Yugoslavia	64.16	64.52	63.96	63.32	62.98	63.98	64.52		2
8	Paul Buxton	Great Britain	63.34	64.00	x	62.76	62.54	x	64.00		1

=== Javelin throw ===
5 August – Old model

Rank	Name	Nationality	#1	#2	#3	#4	#5	#6	Result	Notes	Points
1	Wolfgang Hanisch	East Germany	81.82	88.68	86.86	x	77.42	84.64	88.68		8
2	Michael Wessing	West Germany	80.16	x	x	75.62	87.38	x	87.38		7
3	Aleksandr Makarov	Soviet Union	73.90	82.26	80.36	79.14	76.94	74.86	82.26		6
4	David Ottley	Great Britain	78.60	76.08	80.40	74.88	x	77.46	80.40		5
5	Penitio Lutui	France	75.32	x	x	x	76.20	79.40	79.40		4
6	Piotr Bielczyk	Poland	x	76.48	76.84	77.34	79.30	x	79.30		3
7	Miran Globevnik	Yugoslavia	x	76.80	x	x	70.70	x	76.80		2
8	Agostino Ghesini	Italy							66.62		1

== Women's results ==
=== 100 metres ===
4 August
Wind: +0.3 m/s

Rank	Name	Nationality	Time	Notes	Points
1	Marlies Göhr	East Germany	11.03	CR	8
2	Lyudmila Kondratyeva	Soviet Union	11.15		7
3	Annegret Richter	West Germany	11.22		6
4	Heather Hunte	Great Britain	11.31		5
5	Lilyana Panayotova	Bulgaria	11.36		4
6	Irena Szewińska	Poland	11.39		3
7	Laura Miano	Italy	11.52		2
8	Gabriela Ionescu	Romania	11.83		1

=== 200 metres ===
5 August
Wind: +0.2 m/s

Rank	Name	Nationality	Time	Notes	Points
1	Lyudmila Kondratyeva	Soviet Union	22.40	CR	8
2	Marlies Göhr	East Germany	22.50		7
3	Annegret Richter	West Germany	22.75		6
4	Kathy Smallwood	Great Britain	22.84		5
5	Irena Szewińska	Poland	22.94		4
6	Lilyana Panayotova	Bulgaria	22.97		3
7	Laura Miano	Italy	23.46		2
8	Niculina Chiricuţă	Romania	24.00		1

=== 400 metres ===
4 August

Rank	Lane	Name	Nationality	Time	Notes	Points
1	8	Marita Koch	East Germany	48.60	WR	8
2	4	Mariya Kulchunova	Soviet Union	49.63	NR	7
3	5	Irena Szewińska	Poland	51.27		6
4	3	Donna Hartley	Great Britain	51.85		5
5	6	Elke Decker	West Germany	52.02		4
6	2	Svobodka Damyanova	Bulgaria	52.23		3
7	7	Maria Samungi	Romania	53.42		2
8	1	Erica Rossi	Italy	55.03		1

=== 800 metres ===
4 August

Rank	Name	Nationality	Time	Notes	Points
1	Nikolina Shtereva	Bulgaria	1:56.29	CR	8
2	Yekaterina Poryvkina	Soviet Union	1:57.57		7
3	Anita Weiß	East Germany	1:57.92		6
4	Jolanta Januchta	Poland	1:58.81		5
5	Fița Lovin	Romania	1:58.97		4
6	Christina Boxer	Great Britain	1:59.05		3
7	Ursula Hook	West Germany	2:00.72		2
8	Agnese Possamai	Italy	2:08.03		1

=== 1500 metres ===
5 August

Rank	Name	Nationality	Time	Notes	Points
1	Totka Petrova	Bulgaria	4:03.13	CR	8
2	Giana Romanova	Soviet Union	4:03.38		7
3	Natalia Mărășescu	Romania	4:03.74		6
4	Christiane Stoll	East Germany	4:04.31		5
5	Christine Benning	Great Britain	4:04.68		4
6	Brigitte Kraus	West Germany	4:05.15		3
7	Gabriella Dorio	Italy	4:06.03		2
8	Anna Bukis	Poland	4:11.11		1

=== 3000 metres ===
5 August

Rank	Name	Nationality	Time	Notes	Points
1	Svetlana Guskova	Soviet Union	8:52.00		8
2	Maricica Puică	Romania	8:52.66		7
3	Vesela Yatsinska	Bulgaria	8:52.89	NR	6
4	Ulla Sauer	West Germany	8:57.59		5
5	Celina Sokołowska	Poland	8:59.90		4
6	Margherita Gargano	Italy	9:01.36		3
7	Paula Fudge	Great Britain	9:18.86		2
8	Charlotte Teske	West Germany	9:23.31		1

=== 100 metres hurdles ===
5 August
Wind: -1.1 m/s

Rank	Lane	Name	Nationality	Time	Notes	Points
1	6	Tatyana Anisimova	Soviet Union	12.77	CR	8
2	7	Grażyna Rabsztyn	Poland	12.85		7
3	4	Daniela Teneva	Bulgaria	13.17		6
4	1	Mihaela Dumitrescu	Romania	13.36		5
5	8	Sylvia Kempin	West Germany	13.50		4
6	5	Lorna Boothe	Great Britain	13.57		3
7	3	Patrizia Lombardo	Italy	13.95		2
8	2	Gudrun Berend	East Germany	14.88		1

=== 400 metres hurdles ===
4 August

Rank	Name	Nationality	Time	Notes	Points
1	Marina Makeyeva	Soviet Union	54.82	CR	8
2	Karin Roßley	East Germany	55.10		7
3	Silvia Hollmann	West Germany	56.74		6
4	Christine Warden	Great Britain	57.24		5
5	Adriana Stancu	Romania	57.45		4
6	Bonka Dimova	Bulgaria	58.12		3
7	Giuseppina Cirulli	Italy	59.60		2
8	Elżbieta Katolik	Poland	59.69		1

=== 4 × 100 metres relay ===
4 August

Rank	Nation	Athletes	Time	Note	Points
1	East Germany	Christina Brehmer, Romy Schneider, Ingrid Auerswald, Marlies Göhr	42.09	WR	8
2	Soviet Union	Vera Komisova, Vera Anisimova, Tatyana Anisimova, Lyudmila Kondratyeva	42.49	NR	7
3	Great Britain	Helen Barnett, Wendy Clarke, Kathy Smallwood, Heather Hunte	43.18		6
4	Bulgaria	Sofka Popova, Maria Shishkova, Liliana Panayotova, Ivanka Valkova	43.32	NR	5
5	West Germany	Petra Sharp, Dagmar Schenten, Annegret Richter, Elke Vollmer	43.58		4
6	Poland	Elżbieta Rabsztyn, Zofia Bielczyk, Elżbieta Stachurska, Grażyna Rabsztyn	43.73		3
7	Italy	Patrizia Lombardo, Marisa Masullo, Paola Castellani, Laura Miano	45.09		2
8	Romania	Niculina Chiricuţă, Doina Ciolan, Otilia Șomănescu, Georgeta Tutunaru	45.34		1

=== 4 × 400 metres relay ===
5 August

Rank	Nation	Athletes	Time	Note	Points
1	East Germany	Gabriele Kotte, Christina Brehmer, Brigitte Kohn, Marita Koch	3:19.7	CR	8
2	Soviet Union	Irina Bragyantseva, Nina Zyuskova, Tatyana Prorochenko, Maria Kulchunova	3:20.4	NR	7
3	Great Britain	Joslyn Hoyte-Smith, Verona Elder, Ruth Kennedy, Donna Hartley	3:27.9		6
4	Bulgaria	Violeta Tsvetkova, Totka Petrova, Svobodka Damianova, Nikolina Shtereva	3:28.3		5
5	West Germany	Silke Rasch, Silvia Hollmann, Elke Decker, Gaby Bußmann	3:30.7		4
6	Poland	Barbara Kwietniewska, Jolanta Januchta, Grażyna Oliszewska, Irena Szewińska	3:31.2		3
7	Romania	Ibolya Korodi, Niculina Lazarciuc, Elena Tărîță, Adriana Stancu	3:32.9		2
8	Italy	Giuliana Bargioni, Daniela Porcelli, Marina Favaro, Erica Rossi	3:42.9		1

=== High jump ===
5 August

Rank	Name	Nationality	Result	Notes	Points
1	Rosemarie Ackermann	East Germany	1.99	CR	8
2	Sara Simeoni	Italy	1.94		7
3	Urszula Kielan	Poland	1.92	NR	6
4	Tatyana Denisova	Soviet Union	1.92		5
5	Yordanka Blagoyeva	Bulgaria	1.84		4
6	Petra Wziontek	West Germany	1.84		3
7	Barbara Simmonds	Great Britain	1.84		2
8	Cornelia Popa	Romania	1.82		1

=== Long jump ===
5 August

Rank	Name	Nationality	#1	#2	#3	#4	#5	#6	Result	Notes	Points
1	Brigitte Wujak	East Germany	6.75	x	6.89	–	x	–	6.89		8
2	Doina Anton	Romania	6.50	6.26	6.60	6.59	x	6.20	6.60		7
3	Lidia Gusheva	Bulgaria	6.20	6.44	x	6.47	6.22	6.36	6.47		6
4	Anke Weigt	West Germany	x	6.25	x	x	x	6.46	6.46		5
5	Sue Reeve	Great Britain	x	6.25	x	6.42	x	x	6.45		4
6	Teresa Marciniak	Poland	6.28	6.23	6.42	x	x	6.41	6.42		3
7	Lyudmila Khaustova	Soviet Union	6.16	6.08	6.36	x	6.42	x	6.42		2
8	Barbara Norello	Italy	5.99	x	6.00	x	6.17	5.91	6.17		1

=== Shot put ===
5 August

Rank	Name	Nationality	#1	#2	#3	#4	#5	#6	Result	Notes	Points
1	Ilona Slupianek	East Germany	20.40	20.74	20.62	20.45	20.93	20.89	20.93		8
2	Nunu Abashidze	Soviet Union	19.10	19.75	19.09	19.49	19.63	19.34	19.75		7
3	Ivanka Petrova	Bulgaria	19.56	x	19.13	19.32	x	19.63	19.63		6
4	Eva Wilms	West Germany	18.39	x	18.55	18.94	19.08	18.48	19.08		5
5	Mihaela Loghin	Romania	17.05	17.56	15.74	17.37	17.72	17.79	17.79		4
6	Beata Habrzyk	Poland	15.91	15.94	15.79	17.15	16.72	17.12	17.16		3
7	Judy Oakes	Great Britain	16.08	15.94	15.80	16.24	15.77	15.75	16.24		2
8	Cinzia Petrucci	Italy	16.09	16.05	16.09	15.58	16.07	15.69	16.09		1

=== Discus throw ===
4 August

Rank	Name	Nationality	#1	#2	#3	#4	#5	#6	Result	Notes	Points
1	Evelin Jahl	East Germany	x	63.84	63.92	65.18	68.92	67.08	68.92		8
2	Svetlana Melnikova	Soviet Union	63.70	x	65.78	66.06	63.48	64.44	66.06		7
3	Svetla Bozhkova	Bulgaria	62.66	x	x	x	62.18	62.82	62.82		6
4	Florența Țacu	Romania	59.34	61.62	60.46	60.04	59.98	56.24	61.62		5
5	Meg Ritchie	Great Britain	x	53.16	58.62	57.30	57.40	x	58.62		4
6	Ingra Manecke	West Germany	56.78	x	54.48	54.44	x	x	56.78		3
7	Danuta Majewska	Poland	56.30	54.74	54.18	51.70	51.50	52.14	56.30		2
8	Maristella Bano	Italy	50.88	48.88	47.46	x	x	48.46	50.88		1

=== Javelin throw ===
4 August – Old model

Rank	Name	Nationality	#1	#2	#3	#4	#5	#6	Result	Notes	Points
1	Eva Raduly	Romania	65.54	x	x	64.84	66.28	x	66.28	NR	8
2	Ruth Fuchs	East Germany	65.46	x	x	65.06	60.20	59.86	65.46		7
3	Tessa Sanderson	Great Britain	62.38	56.74	x	53.60	x	x	62.38		6
4	Saida Gunba	Soviet Union	61.32	56.74	61.30	62.08	x	61.50	62.08		5
5	Bernadetta Blechacz	Poland	61.32	56.74	61.30	62.08	x	61.50	62.08		4
6	Ivanka Vancheva	Bulgaria	59.16	57.02	x	55.94	59.24	x	59.24		3
7	Eva Helmschmidt	West Germany	57.96	57.58	56.10	53.62	58.80	x	58.80		2
8	Fausta Quintavalla	Italy	x	x	53.98	52.84	x	52.58	53.98		1
