= Athletics at the 1980 Summer Olympics – Women's 4 × 400 metres relay =

Women's 4 × 400 metres relay at the Games of the XXII Olympiad
- Venue: Grand Arena of the Central Lenin Stadium
- Dates: 31 July 1980 (round 1); 1 August 1980 (final)
- Competitors: 47 from 11 nations
- Winning time: 3:20.2 / 3:20.12

Medalists
1st place, gold medalist(s)		Tatyana Prorochenko, Tatyana Goyshchik, Nina Ziuskova, Irina Nazarova	Soviet Union
2nd place, silver medalist(s)		Barbara Krug, Gabriele Löwe, Christina Lathan, Marita Koch	East Germany
3rd place, bronze medalist(s)		Linsey MacDonald, Michelle Probert, Joslyn Hoyte-Smith, Donna Hartley	Great Britain

These are the official results of the women's 4 × 400 m relay event at the 1980 Summer Olympics in Moscow, Soviet Union. A total of 11 nations competed. The final was held on 1 August 1980. The event was won by the Soviet Union team of Tatyana Prorochenko, Tatyana Goyshchik, Nina Ziuskova and Irina Nazarova, which beat the East German team. Great Britain came third.

== Records ==
These were the standing World and Olympic records (in seconds) prior to the 1980 Summer Olympics.

World record	3:19.23	(East Germany) Doris Maletzki (East Germany) Brigitte Rohde (East Germany) Ellen Streidt (East Germany) Christina Lathan	Montreal (CAN)	31 July 1976
Olympic record	3:19.23	(East Germany) Doris Maletzki (East Germany) Brigitte Rohde (East Germany) Ellen Streidt (East Germany) Christina Lathan	Montreal (CAN)	31 July 1976

== Final ==
- Held on Friday 1 August 1980

RANK	NATION	ATHLETES	TIME
Gold medal	Soviet Union	• Tatyana Prorochenko • Tatyana Goyshchik • Nina Ziuskova • Irina Nazarova	3:20.12
Silver medal	East Germany	• Barbara Krug • Gabriele Löwe • Christina Lathan • Marita Koch	3:20.35
Bronze medal	Great Britain	• Linsey MacDonald • Michelle Probert • Joslyn Hoyte-Smith • Donna Hartley	3:27.5
4.	Romania	• Iboia Korodi • Niculina Lazarciuc • Maria Samungi • Elena Tarfta	3:27.74
5.	Hungary	• Iren Orosz • Judit Forgecs • Eva Toth • Ilona Pal	3:27.9
6.	Poland	• Grazyna Oliszewska • Elzbieta Katolik • Jolanta Januchta • Malgorzata Dunecka	3:27.9
7.	Belgium	• Lea Alaerts • Regine Berg • Anne Michel • Rosine Wallez	3:31.6
–	Bulgaria	• Svobodka Damianova • Rositsa Stamenova • Malena Andonova • Bonka Dimova	DNF

== Semi-finals ==
- Held on Thursday 31 July 1980

=== Heat 1 ===
RANK	NATION	ATHLETES	TIME
1.	Soviet Union	• Olga Mineyeva • Tatyana Goyshchik • Lyudmila Chernova • Tatyana Prorochenko	3:25.3
2.	Bulgaria	• Svobodka Damyanova • Rositsa Stamenova • Malena Andonova • Bonka Dimova	3:28.7
3.	Great Britain	• Linsey MacDonald • Michelle Probert • Joslyn Hoyte-Smith • Donna Hartley	3:29.0
4.	Jamaica	• Ruth Williams-Simpson • Jacqueline Pusey • Cathy Rattray • Merlene Ottey	3:31.5
5.	Italy	• Rossana Lombardo • Agnese Possamai • Daniela Porcelli • Erika Rossi	3:46.2

=== Heat 2 ===
RANK	NATION	ATHLETES	TIME
1.	East Germany	• Gabriele Löwe • Barbara Krug • Christina Lathan • Marita Koch	3:28.7
2.	Poland	• Grazyna Oliszewska • Jolanta Januchta • Elzbieta Katolik • Malgorzata Dunecka	3:29.7
3.	Hungary	• Iren Orosz • Judit Forgecs • Iboiya Petrika • Ilona Pal	3:29.7
4.	Romania	• Ibolya Korodi • Niculina Lazarciuc • Maria Samungi • Elena Tarfta	3:29.8
5.	Belgium	• Lea Alaerts • Regine Berg • Anne Michel • Rosine Wallez	3:30.7
6.	Nigeria	• Gloria Ayanlaja • Kehinde Vaughan • Asele Woy • Mary Akinyemi	3:36.0

== See also ==
- 1982 Women's European Championships 4 × 400 m Relay (Athens)
- 1983 World Championships in Athletics Women's 4 × 400 m Relay (Helsinki)
