= Athletics at the 1979 Spartakiad of the Peoples of the USSR =

1979 Soviet Spartakiad
- Dates: 21 – 29 July 1979
- Host city: Moscow, Russian SFSR
- Venue: Central Lenin Stadium
- Level: Senior
- Type: Outdoor

The athletics events of the final stage of the 7th Summer Spartakiad of the Peoples of the USSR were held in the Central Lenin (Luzhniki) Stadium in Moscow between 21 July and 29 July 1979.

One world record was broken, by Marina Makeyeva in the women's 400 m hurdles.

== Men's events ==
Event	Gold		Silver		Bronze	
100 m	Silvio Leonard (CUB)	10.30	Houston McTear (USA)	10.39	Osvaldo Lara (CUB)	10.41
200 m	Wardell Gilbreath (USA)	20.84	Don Coleman (USA)	21.05	Nikolay Sidorov (URS)	21.20
400 m	Stan Vinson (USA)	45.70	Nikolay Chernetskiy (URS)	46.05	Dele Udo (NGR)	46.15
800 m	Anatoliy Reshetnyak (URS)	1:47.2	Vladimir Podolyako (URS)	1:47.4	Detlef Wagenknecht (GDR)	1:47.5
1500 m	Vladimir Ponomaryov (URS)	3:38.6	Craig Masback (USA)	3:38.9	Andreas Busse (GDR)	3:39.1
5000 m	Miruts Yifter (ETH)	13:20.8	Yohannes Mohamed (ETH)	13:21.1	Valeriy Abramov (URS)	13:21.7
10,000 m	Miruts Yifter (ETH)	27:44.2	Aleksandras Antipovas (URS)	27:47.4	Gerard Barrett (AUS)	27:50.7
Marathon	Leonid Moseyev (URS)	2:13:19.6	Shigeru So (JPN)	2:13:19.8	Viktor Zubov (URS)	2:13:20
20 km walk	Nikolay Vinnichenko (URS)	1:22:29.0	Anatoliy Solomin (URS)	1:22:39.2	Boris Yakovlev (URS)	1:23:06.3
50 km walk	Viktor Dorovskikh (URS)	3:46:25	Vladimir Rezayev (URS)	3:46:57	Vyacheslav Fursov (URS)	3:47:55
110 m hurdles	Aleksandr Puchkov (URS)	13.68	Andrey Prokofyev (URS)	13.76	Andrey Korostelev (URS)	13.94
400 m hurdles	Vasyl Arkhypenko (URS)	49.11	Dmitriy Stukalov (URS)	50.23	Valeriy Mashkovskiy (URS)	50.85
3000 m SC	Henry Marsh (USA)	8:28.1	Paul Copu (ROM)	8:28.6	Vladimir Lisovskiy (URS)	8:29.7
4 × 100 m relay	United States (USA); Cliff Wiley; Rich Edwards; Wardell Gilbreath; Don Coleman	39.33	Moscow (URS); Semyon Vakhanelov; Andrey Shlyapnikov; Aleksandr Cherkashin; Nikolay Sidorov	39.48	Leningrad (URS); Yevgeniy Kovalyov; Yuriy Naumenko; Aleksandr Aksinin; Nikolay Kolesnikov	39.57
4 × 200 m relay	United States (USA); Carl Lewis; Don Coleman; Wardell Gilbreath; Rich Edwards	1:22.0	Leningrad (URS); Mikhail Kravtsov; Aleksandr Stasevich; Ivan Babenko; Sergey Vladimirtsev	1:22.5	Moscow (URS); Andrey Shlyapnikov; Nikolay Sidorov; Aleksandr Cherkashin; Aleksandr Yagudin	1:23.2
4 × 400 m relay	United States (USA); Cliff Wiley; Ronnie Harris; Fred Taylor; Stan Vinson	3:03.7	Moscow (URS); Leonid Korolev; Mikhail Linge; Dmitry Stukalov; Nikolay Chernetsky	3:03.9	Ukraine (URS); Vladimir Belokon; Pawel Roschtschin; Valeriy Moshkovskiy; Viktor Burakov	3:05.2
4 × 800 m relay	Byelorussian Soviet Socialist Republic (BLR); Mikhail Starovoitov; Pavel Troshchilo; Vladimir Podolyako; Nikolay Kirov	7:11.1	Leningrad (URS); Vladimir Ponomaryov; Viktor Anokhin; Vladimir Malozemlin; Nikolay Shirokov	7:12.7	Ukraine (URS); Valeriy Liskov; Sergey Shapovalov; Vitaliy Tyshchenko; Anatoliy Reshetnyak	7:13.1
High jump	Aleksandr Grigoryev (URS)	2.24	Benn Fields (USA)	2.24	Gerd Nagel (FRG)	2.21
Pole vault	Konstantin Volkov (URS)	5.55	Vladimir Trofimenko (URS)	5.50	Antti Kalliomäki (FIN)	5.45
Long jump	Frank Paschek (GDR)	8.25	David Giralt (CUB)	8.12	Carl Lewis (USA)	8.04
Triple jump	Gennadiy Valyukevich (URS)	17.21	Jaak Uudmäe (URS)	16.84	Anatoliy Piskulin (URS)	16.76
Shot put	Valeriy Voykin (URS)	20.58	Vladimir Kiselyov (URS)	20.39	Anatoliy Yarosh (URS)	20.38
Discus throw	John Powell (USA)	63.06	Velko Velev (BUL)	62.68	Pyotr Mikhailov (URS)	62.14
Hammer throw	Sergey Litvinov (URS)	77.08	Aleksey Malyukov (URS)	75.42	Aleksandr Buneyev (URS)	75.10
Javelin throw	Detlef Michel (GDR)	87.46	Karl Heller (GDR)	86.80	Arto Härkönen (FIN)	85.68
Decathlon	Aleksandr Grebenyuk (URS)	8166	Konstantin Akhapkin (URS)	8111	Yuriy Kutsenko (URS)	8086

== Women's events ==
Event	Gold		Silver		Bronze	
100 m	Lyudmila Kondratyeva (URS)	11.19	Karen Hawkins (USA)	11.32	Vera Anisimova (URS)	11.39
200 m	Lyudmila Kondratyeva (URS)	22.66	Karen Hawkins (USA)	23.06	Marina Sidorova (URS)	23.45
400 m	Mariya Kulchunova (URS)	49.77	Nina Zyuskova (URS)	50.42	Tatyana Goyshchik (URS)	50.49
800 m	Yekaterina Poryvkina (URS)	1:57.2	Nadezhda Mushta (URS)	1:57.5	Olga Mineyeva (URS)	1:57.8
1500 m	Natalia Mărășescu (ROM)	3:58.8	Giana Romanova (URS)	4:00.5	Valentina Ilyinykh (URS)	4:01.1
3000 m	Svetlana Ulmasova (URS)	8:46.0	Valentina Ilyinykh (URS)	8:46.5	Lyubov Kopeykina (URS)	8:49.1
100 m hurdles	Tatyana Anisimova (URS)	12.90	Vera Komisova (URS)	12.94	Nina Morgulina (URS)	13.10
400 m hurdles	Marina Makeyeva (URS)	54.78 WR	Tatyana Storozheva (URS)	55.08	Tatyana Zelentsova (URS)	55.64
4 × 100 m relay	Moscow (URS); Vera Anisimova; Lyudmila Storozhkova; Olga Korotkova; Irina Litovchenko	43.74	Leningrad (URS); Vera Komisova; Tatyana Anisimova; Galina Dyachenko; Tatyana Savchenko	44.07	Ukraine (URS); Larisa Sivokon; Elena Potrebenko; Raisa Makhova; Victoria Dashchenko	44.47
4 × 200 m relay	Ukraine (URS); Raisa Makhova; Nina Zyuskova; Tatyana Prorochenko; Mariya Pinigina	1:30.8	Moscow (URS); Irina Galchenkova; Irina Nazarova; Olga Korotkova; Vera Anisimova	1:31.6	Russian SFSR (URS); Vera Akchurina; Lyudmila Chernova; Nadezhda Aldoshina; Tatyana Goyshchik	1:32.3
4 × 400 m relay	Ukraine (URS); Irina Olkhovnikova; Nina Zyuskova; Tatyana Prorochenko; Mariya Pinigina	3:26.1	Russian SFSR (URS); Tatyana Goyshchik; Olga Mineyeva; Marina Stepanova; Nadezhda Olizarenko	3:26.2	Moscow (URS); Natalya Ivanova; Svetlana Styrkina; Vera Gracheva; Irina Nazarova	3:32.9
4 × 800 m relay	Russian SFSR (URS); Olga Mineyeva; Maria Enkina; Nadezhda Olizarenko; Yekaterina Podkopayeva	7:59.6	Ukraine (URS); Tamara Koba; Svetlana Popova; Lyubov Smolka; Olga Vakhrusheva	8:03.2	Leningrad (URS); Natalya Kuznetsova; Tatyana Kazankina; Olga Dvirna; Lyudmila Veselkova	8:04.9
High jump	Yelena Goloborodko (URS)	1.91	Nataliya Litvinenko (URS)	1.89	Tatyana Denisova (URS)	1.89
Long jump	Anita Stukane (URS)	6.66	Nadezhda Karyakina (URS)	6.39	Lyudmila Khaustova (URS)	6.37
Shot put	Ilona Slupianek (GDR)	21.52	Margitta Pufe (GDR)	21.45	Helena Fibingerová (TCH)	21.23
Discus throw	Svetlana Melnikova (URS)	64.90	Margitta Pufe (GDR)	63.74	Lyudmila Isayeva (URS)	62.16
Javelin throw	Saida Gunba (URS)	63.08	María Caridad Colón (CUB)	62.30	Ute Hommola (GDR)	60.08
Pentathlon	Yekaterina Smirnova (URS)	4770	Olga Kuragina (URS)	4629	Nadezhda Karyakina (URS)	4554
