= Athletics at the 1980 Summer Olympics – Women's 400 metres =

Women's 400 metres at the Games of the XXII Olympiad
- Venue: Lenin Central Stadium
- Dates: 25 July 1980 (heats); 27 July 1980 (semi-finals); 28 July 1980 (final)
- Competitors: 39 from 22 nations
- Winning time: 48.88 OR

Medalists
1st place, gold medalist(s)		Marita Koch; East Germany
2nd place, silver medalist(s)		Jarmila Kratochvílová; Czechoslovakia
3rd place, bronze medalist(s)		Christina Lathan; East Germany

These are the official results of the women's 400 metres event at the 1980 Summer Olympics in Moscow. The competition was held from July 25 to July 28, 1980.

== Final ==
- Held on Monday July 28, 1980

Rank	Athlete	Nation	Time	Notes
1st place, gold medalist(s)	Marita Koch	East Germany	48.88	OR
2nd place, silver medalist(s)	Jarmila Kratochvílová	Czechoslovakia	49.46	NR
3rd place, bronze medalist(s)	Christina Lathan	East Germany	49.66	
4	Irina Nazarova	Soviet Union	50.07	
5	Nina Zyuskova	Soviet Union	50.17	
6	Gabriele Löwe	East Germany	51.33	
7	Pirjo Häggman	Finland	51.35	
8	Linsey MacDonald	Great Britain	52.40	

== Semifinals ==
- Held on Sunday July 27, 1980

Rank	Athlete	Nation	Time	Notes
1	Marita Koch	East Germany	50.57	
2	Gabriele Löwe	East Germany	50.85	
3	Pirjo Häggman	Finland	51.02	
4	Nina Zyuskova	Soviet Union	51.12	
5	Lyudmila Chernova	Soviet Union	51.30	
6	Joslyn Hoyte-Smith	Great Britain	51.47	
7	Małgorzata Dunecka	Poland	51.93	
8	Rositsa Stamenova	Bulgaria	52.96	

Rank	Athlete	Nation	Time	Notes
1	Christina Lathan	East Germany	50.16	
2	Irina Nazarova	Soviet Union	50.18	
3	Jarmila Kratochvílová	Czechoslovakia	50.79	
4	Linsey MacDonald	Great Britain	51.60	
5	Michelle Probert	Great Britain	51.89	
6	Ilona Pál	Hungary	51.99	
7	Grażyna Oliszewska	Poland	52.36	
8	Irena Szewińska	Poland	53.13	

== Heats ==
- Held on Friday July 25, 1980

Rank	Athlete	Nation	Time	Notes
1	Christina Lathan	East Germany	51.33	
2	Ilona Pál	Hungary	51.99	
3	Michelle Probert	Great Britain	52.16	
4	Svobodka Damyanova	Bulgaria	52.23	
5	Niculina Lazarciuc	Romania	52.52	
6	Ann-Louise Skoglund	Sweden	52.78	
7	Kehinde Vaughan	Nigeria	53.54	
8	Eugenia Osho-Williams	Sierra Leone	1:00.44	

Rank	Athlete	Nation	Time	Notes
1	Nina Ziuskova	Soviet Union	51.42	
2	Linsey MacDonald	Great Britain	52.57	
3	Rositsa Stamenova	Bulgaria	52.71	
4	Maria Samungi	Romania	52.89	
5	Sophie Malbranque	France	53.46	
6	Hala El-Moughrabi	Syria	59.33	
7	Xiomara Larios	Nicaragua	1:01.50	

Rank	Athlete	Nation	Time	Notes
1	Irina Nazarova	Soviet Union	51.66	
2	Pirjo Häggman	Finland	52.56	
3	Irena Szewińska	Poland	52.57	
4	Karoline Käfer	Austria	52.82	
5	Erica Rossi	Italy	52.98	
6	Judit Forgács	Hungary	53.06	
7	Marième Boye	Senegal	55.16	

Rank	Athlete	Nation	Time	Notes
1	Joslyn Hoyte-Smith	Great Britain	52.24	
2	Gabriele Löwe	East Germany	52.43	
3	Grażyna Oliszewska	Poland	52.62	
4	Mary Akinyemi	Nigeria	52.64	
5	Elena Tărîţă	Romania	52.96	
6	Malena Andonova	Bulgaria	53.30	
7	Anne Michel	Belgium	54.22	
8	Acacia Mate	Mozambique	1:00.90	

Rank	Athlete	Nation	Time	Notes
1	Jarmila Kratochvílová	Czechoslovakia	51.04	
2	Marita Koch	East Germany	51.06	
3	Lyudmila Chernova	Soviet Union	51.51	
4	Małgorzata Dunecka	Poland	51.84	
5	Rosine Wallez	Belgium	52.00	
6	Gloria Ayanlaja	Nigeria	53.55	
7	Ruth Williams-Simpson	Jamaica	55.59	
8	Trần Thị Ngọc Anh	Vietnam	1:00.62	

== See also ==
- 1976 Women's Olympic 400 metres (Montreal)
- 1978 Women's European Championships 400 metres (Prague)
- 1982 Women's European Championships 400 metres (Athens)
- 1983 Women's World Championships 400 metres (Helsinki)
- 1984 Women's Olympic 400 metres (Los Angeles)
