= Athletics at the 1979 Summer Universiade – Women's 400 metres =

The women's 400 metres event at the 1979 Summer Universiade was held at the Estadio Olimpico Universitario in Mexico City on 8, 9 and 10 September 1979.

== Medalists ==
Gold	Silver	Bronze
Mariya Kulchunova; Soviet Union	Rosalyn Bryant; United States	Christina Brehmer; East Germany

== Results ==
=== Heats ===
Rank	Heat	Athlete	Nationality	Time	Notes
1	1	Mariya Kulchunova	Soviet Union	51.96	Q
2	2	Christina Brehmer	East Germany	52.11	Q
3	1	Rosalyn Bryant	United States	52.65	Q
4	4	Marie-Christine Champenois	France	52.68	Q
5	2	Ilona Pál	Hungary	52.76	Q
6	1	Christiane Wildschek	Austria	52.80	Q
7	4	Tatyana Prorochenko	Soviet Union	52.83	Q
8	3	Elena Tărîță	Romania	52.94	Q
9	1	Sophie Malbranque	France	53.02	q
10	2	Anne Michel	Belgium	53.18	Q
11	3	Éva Mohácsi	Hungary	53.52	Q
12	1	Ruth Kennedy	Great Britain	53.58	q
13	4	Marième Boye	Senegal	53.77	Q
14	3	Pirjo Häggman	Finland	53.78	Q
15	3	Anne Mackie-Morelli	Canada	53.98	q
16	1	Gloria Ayanlaja	Nigeria	54.02	q
17	4	Ana Guibert	Cuba	54.13	
18	1	Tânia Miranda	Brazil	54.56	
19	1	Kim Freakley	New Zealand	55.26	
20	2	Joan Elumelu	Nigeria	55.41	
21	2	Debbie Campbell	Canada	55.43	
22	4	Patricia Jackson	United States	55.64	
23	2	Kay Hawkins	New Zealand	55.82	
24	3	Ana Orendaín	Mexico	56.59	
25	4	Guadalupe García	Mexico	57.12	
26	2	Patricia Meigham	Guatemala	58.84	
27	3	Anh Tran Thi Ngoc	Vietnam	1:00.40	

=== Semifinals ===
Rank	Heat	Athlete	Nationality	Time	Notes
1	1	Mariya Kulchunova	Soviet Union	50.95	Q
2	2	Christina Brehmer	East Germany	51.52	Q
3	2	Rosalyn Bryant	United States	51.94	Q
4	1	Ilona Pál	Hungary	52.09	Q
5	1	Elena Tărîță	Romania	52.12	Q
5	2	Tatyana Prorochenko	Soviet Union	52.12	Q
7	1	Pirjo Häggman	Finland	52.30	Q
8	1	Marie-Christine Champenois	France	52.69	
8	2	Christiane Wildschek	Austria	52.69	Q
10	1	Anne Michel	Belgium	53.23	
11	2	Éva Mohácsi	Hungary	53.25	
12	1	Ruth Kennedy	Great Britain	53.27	
13	2	Anne Mackie-Morelli	Canada	53.49	
14	1	Marième Boye	Senegal	53.75	
15	2	Sophie Malbranque	France	54.07	
16	2	Gloria Ayanlaja	Nigeria	54.18	

=== Final ===
Rank	Athlete	Nationality	Time	Notes
1st place, gold medalist(s)	Mariya Kulchunova	Soviet Union	50.35	UR
2nd place, silver medalist(s)	Rosalyn Bryant	United States	51.35	
3rd place, bronze medalist(s)	Christina Brehmer	East Germany	51.59	
4	Tatyana Prorochenko	Soviet Union	51.68	
5	Elena Tărîță	Romania	52.69	
6	Pirjo Häggman	Finland	53.05	
7	Ilona Pál	Hungary	53.10	
8	Christiane Wildschek	Austria	53.80	
