= 1980 in the sport of athletics =

1980 in athletics
- Major world events: Olympic Games

This article contains an overview of the year 1980 in athletics. The major athletics event of the year was the 1980 Moscow Olympics. A boycott of this competition meant many of world's leading athletes did not face each other, with many of the boycotting athletes taking part in the rival Liberty Bell Classic competition.

A further global event, the 1980 World Championships in Athletics, was held specifically for women athletes in the 400 metres hurdles and 3000 metres disciplines, as neither event featured on the Olympic programme in spite of IAAF approval.

== Major events ==
=== World ===
- Olympic Games
- Paralympic Games
- World Cross Country Championships
- World Championships in Athletics
- Liberty Bell Classic (Olympic Boycott Games)
- Gymnasiade

=== Regional ===
- CARIFTA Games
- CAC Junior Championships
- Pan American Junior Championships
- South American Junior Championships
- European Indoor Championships
- European Champion Clubs Cup Cross Country
- European Champion Clubs Cup
- Islamic Games
- Balkan Games

== World records ==
=== Men ===
Event	Athlete	Nation	Performance	Place	Date
1000 m	Sebastian Coe	United Kingdom	2:13.40	Oslo, Norway	1 July
1500 m	Steve Ovett	United Kingdom	3:31.36	Koblenz, West Germany	17 August
Mile	Steve Ovett	United Kingdom	3:48.8	Oslo, Norway	1 July
400 m hurdles	Edwin Moses	United States	47.13	Milan, Italy	3 July
High jump	Jacek Wszoła	Poland	2.35	Eberstadt, West Germany	25 May
High jump	Dietmar Mögenburg	West Germany	2.35	Rehlingen, West Germany	26 May
High jump	Gerd Wessig	East Germany	2.36	(Soviet Union) Moscow, Russia	1 August
Pole vault	Władysław Kozakiewicz	Poland	5.72	Milan, Italy	11 May
Pole vault	Thierry Vigneron	France	5.75	Colombes, France	1 June
Pole vault	Thierry Vigneron	France	5.75	Lille, France	29 June
Pole vault	Philippe Houvion	France	5.77	Paris, France	17 July
Pole vault	Władysław Kozakiewicz	Poland	5.78	Moscow, Soviet Union	30 July
Hammer throw	Yuriy Sedykh	Soviet Union	80.38	Leselidze, Soviet Union	16 May
Hammer throw	Jüri Tamm	Soviet Union	80.46	Leselidze, Soviet Union	16 May
Hammer throw	Yuriy Sedykh	Soviet Union	80.64	Leselidze, Soviet Union	16 May
Hammer throw	Sergey Litvinov	Soviet Union	81.66	Sochi, Soviet Union	24 May
Hammer throw	Yuriy Sedykh	Soviet Union	81.80	Moscow, Soviet Union	31 July
Javelin throw	Ferenc Paragi	Hungary	96.72	Tata, Hungary	23 April
Decathlon	Daley Thompson	United Kingdom	8622	Götzis, Austria	17-18 May
Decathlon	Guido Kratschmer	West Germany	8649	Filderstadt-Bernhausen, West Germany	14-15 June

=== Women ===
Event	Athlete	Nation	Performance	Place	Date
800 m	Nadiya Olizarenko	Soviet Union	1:54.85	Moscow, Soviet Union	12 June
800 m	Nadiya Olizarenko	Soviet Union	1:53.43	Moscow, Soviet Union	27 July
1500 m	Tatyana Kazankina	Soviet Union	3:55.0	Moscow, Soviet Union	6 July
1500 m	Tatyana Kazankina	Soviet Union	3:52.47	Zürich, Switzerland	13 August
Mile	Mary Decker	United States	4:21.7	Auckland, New Zealand	26 January
100 m hurdles	Grażyna Rabsztyn	Poland	12.36	Warsaw, Poland	13 June
400 m hurdles	Karin Rossley	East Germany	54.28	Jena, East Germany	13 June
4 × 100 metres relay	Romy Schneider; Bärbel Eckert; Ingrid Auerswald; Marlies Göhr	East Germany	42.09	Berlin, East Germany	9 July
4 × 100 metres relay	Romy Müller; Bärbel Wöckel; Ingrid Auerswald; Marlies Göhr	East Germany	41.85	Potsdam, East Germany	13 July
4 × 100 metres relay	Romy Müller; Bärbel Wöckel; Ingrid Auerswald; Marlies Göhr	East Germany	41.60	Moscow, Soviet Union	1 August
4 × 200 metres relay	Marlies Göhr; Romy Müller; Bärbel Wöckel; Marita Koch	East Germany	1:28.15	Jena, East Germany	9 August
Shot put	Ilona Slupianek	East Germany	22.36	(Socialist Federal Republic of Yugoslavia) Celje, Yugoslavia	2 May
Shot put	Ilona Slupianek	East Germany	22.45	Potsdam, East Germany	10 May
Discus throw	Faina Melnik	Soviet Union	71.50	Sochi, Soviet Union	10 May
Discus throw	Mariya Petkova	Bulgaria	71.80	Sofia, Bulgaria	13 July
Javelin throw	Ruth Fuchs	East Germany	69.96	(Socialist Federal Republic of Yugoslavia) Split, Yugoslavia	29 April
Javelin throw	Tatyana Biryulina	Soviet Union	70.08	Podolsk, Soviet Union	12 July
Pentathlon	Olga Kuragina	Soviet Union	4856	Moscow, Soviet Union	20 June
Pentathlon	Nadiya Tkachenko	Soviet Union	5083	Moscow, Soviet Union	24 July

== Season's bests ==
Best marks of the year
Event	Men			Women		
Event	Athlete	Mark	Notes	Athlete	Mark	Notes
100 metres	James Sanford (USA)	10.02		Marlies Göhr (GER)	10.93	
200 metres	Pietro Mennea (ITA)	19.96		Bärbel Wöckel (GER)	22.01	
400 metres	Viktor Markin (URS)	44.60		Marita Koch (GER)	48.88	
800 metres	Don Paige (USA)	1:44.53		Nadiya Olizarenko (URS)	1:53.43	
1,500 metres	Steve Ovett (GBR)	3:31.36		Tatyana Kazankina (URS)	3:52.47	
Mile run	Steve Ovett (GBR)	3:48.8		Mary Slaney (USA)	4:21.68	
3000 metres	Eamonn Coghlan (IRL)	7:37.60		Yelena Sipatova (URS)	8:33.53	
5000 metres	Miruts Yifter (ETH)	13:16.38		Jan Merrill (USA)	15:30.6	
10,000 metres	Craig Virgin (USA)	27:29.16		Kathryn Binns (GBR)	32:57.17	
Half marathon	Stan Mavis (USA)	1:02:16		Marja Wokke (NED)	1:13:59	
Marathon	Gerard Nijboer (NED)	2:09:01		Joyce Smith (GBR)	2:30:27	
110 m/100 m hurdles	Renaldo Nehemiah (USA)	13.21		Grażyna Rabsztyn (POL)	12.36	
400 m hurdles	Edwin Moses (USA)	47.13		Karin Roßley (GDR)	54.28	
3000 m steeplechase	Bronisław Malinowski (POL)	8:09.70		—	—	
4 × 100 m relay	Soviet Union; Vladimir Muravyov; Nikolay Sidorov; Aleksandr Aksinin; Andrey Prokofyev	38.26		East Germany; Romy Müller; Bärbel Wöckel; Ingrid Auerswald; Marlies Göhr	41.60	
4 × 400 m relay	Soviet Union; Remigijus Valiulis; Mikhail Linge; Nikolay Chernetskiy; Viktor Markin	3:01.08		Soviet Union; Tatyana Prorochenko; Tatyana Goyshchik; Nina Zyuskova; Irina Nazarova	3:20.12	
High jump	Gerd Wessig (GDR)	2.36 m		Sara Simeoni (ITA)	1.98 m	
Pole vault	Władysław Kozakiewicz (POL)	5.78 m		—	—	
Long jump	Lutz Dombrowski (GDR)	8.54 m		Tatyana Kolpakova (URS)	7.06 m	
Triple jump	Jaak Uudmäe (URS)	17.35 m		—	—	
Shot put	Udo Beyer (GDR)	21.98 m		Ilona Slupianek (GDR)	22.45 m	
Discus throw	Mac Wilkins (USA)	70.98 m		Mariya Petkova (BUL)	71.80 m	
Hammer throw	Yuriy Syedikh (URS)	81.80 m		—	—	
Javelin (old design)	Ferenc Paragi (HUN)	96.72 m		Tatyana Biryulina (URS)	70.08 m	
Decathlon	Guido Kratschmer (FRG)	8667 pts		—	—	
Pentathlon	—	—		Nadiya Tkachenko (URS)	5083 pts	

== Marathon winners ==
Race	Men's winner	Women's winner
Amsterdam Marathon	Gerard Nijboer (NED)	Marja Wokke (NED)
Avon International Marathon	–	Lorraine Moller (NZL)
Beppu-Ōita Marathon	Yutaka Taketomi (JPN)	–
Berlin Marathon	Ingo Sensburg (FRG)	Gerlinde Püttmann (FRG)
Boston Marathon	Bill Rodgers (USA)	Jacqueline Gareau (CAN)
Chicago Marathon	Frank Richardson (USA)	Sue Petersen (USA)
Fukuoka Marathon	Toshihiko Seko (JPN)	–
Košice Marathon	Aleksey Lyagushev (URS)	Šárka Balcarová (TCH)
Lake Biwa Marathon	Hiroshi Yuge (JPN)	–
New York Marathon	Alberto Salazar (USA)	Grete Waitz (NOR)
Paris Marathon	Sylvain Cacciatore (FRA)	Gillian Adams (GBR)
Tokyo Women's Marathon	–	Joyce Smith (GBR)

== Awards ==
Award	Men's winner	Women's winner
Track & Field News Athlete of the Year	Edwin Moses (USA)	Ilona Briesenick (GDR)

== Births ==
- January 1 – Masumi Aya, Japanese hammer thrower
- January 2 – Yusuke Yachi, Japanese race walker
- January 7 – Lívia Tóth, Hungarian distance runner
- January 8 – Mitsuhiro Sato, Japanese sprinter
- January 11 – Li Xiaoxue, Chinese hammer thrower
- January 19 – Matic Osovnikar, Slovenian sprinter
- January 21 – Elva Goulbourne, Jamaican long jumper
- January 25 – Christian Olsson, Swedish athlete
- January 27 – Naleya Downer, Jamaican sprinter
- January 31 – Joel Brown, American hurdler
- January 31 – Adriana Pirtea, Romanian long-distance runner
- February 3 – Markus Esser, German hammer thrower
- February 3 – Sini Pöyry, Finnish hammer thrower
- February 4 – Yared Asmerom, Eritrean long-distance runner
- February 4 – Gary Kikaya, Congolese sprinter
- February 7 – Emma Ania, British sprinter
- February 11 – Karin Ruckstuhl, Dutch heptathlete
- February 13 – Tetyana Holovchenko, Ukrainian distance runner
- February 13 – Irina Naumenko, Kazakhstani heptathlete
- February 20 – Bram Som, Dutch track and field athlete
- February 21 – Takayuki Matsumiya, Japanese long-distance runner
- February 24 – Aki Heikkinen, Finnish decathlete
- February 25 – Marisa Barros, Portuguese long-distance runner
- February 26 – Irina Butor, Belarusian heptathlete
- March 3 – Nikolett Szabó, Hungarian javelin thrower
- March 7 – Olli-Pekka Karjalainen, Finnish hammer thrower
- March 12 – California Molefe, Botswanan athlete
- March 15 – Kim Il-Nam, North Korean long-distance runner
- March 19 – Justus Koech, Kenyan middle-distance runner
- March 23 – Teja Melink, Slovenian pole vaulter
- March 30 – Amélie Perrin, Franch hammer thrower
- April 6 – Tommi Evilä, Finnish long jumper
- April 13 – Boštjan Buč, Slovenian track and field athlete
- April 17 – Igors Kazakevičs, Latvian race walker
- April 18 – Wojciech Kondratowicz, Polish hammer thrower
- April 19 – Gudisa Shentema, Ethiopian long-distance runner
- May 1 – Inês Henriques, Portuguese race walker
- May 2 – Chris Boyles, American decathlete
- May 2 – Ronetta Smith, Jamaican sprinter
- May 10 – Mayumi Kawasaki, Japanese race walker
- May 14 – Eugène Martineau, Dutch decathlete
- May 17 – Tatyana Sibileva, Russian race walker
- May 20 – Chinatsu Mori, Japanese shot putter (d. 2006)
- May 23 – Ri Kum-Song, North Korean long-distance runner
- June 2 – Shingo Suetsugu, Japanese track and field athlete
- June 8 – Vânia Silva, Portuguese hammer thrower
- June 13 – Alistair Cragg, Irish distance runner
- June 17 – Shitaye Gemechu, Ethiopian long-distance runner
- June 19 – Sanjay Ayre, Jamaican athlete
- July 5 – Park Ju-Young, South Korean long-distance runner
- July 8 – Noraldo Palacios, Colombian javelin thrower
- July 9 – Brooke Krueger, Australian hammer thrower
- July 12 – Mikko Kyyrö, Finnish discus thrower
- July 17 – Rashid Ramzi, Moroccan athlete
- July 24 – Wilfred Bungei, Kenyan middle-distance runner
- July 27 – Alena Neumiarzhitskaya, Belarusian sprinter
- July 31 – Masato Naito, Japanese hurdler
- August 11 – Monika Pyrek, Polish pole vaulter
- August 23 – Bronwyn Eagles, Australian hammer thrower
- August 23 – Roisin McGettigan, Irish distance runner
- August 24 – Shani Marks, American triple jumper
- August 29 – Perdita Felicien, Canadian track and field athlete
- September 6 – Nailiya Yulamanova, Russian long-distance runner
- September 6 – Gulnara Vygovskaya, Russian long-distance runner
- September 8 – Mbulaeni Mulaudzi, South African middle-distance runner
- September 16 – Lukáš Melich, Czech hammer thrower
- September 25 – Jennifer Joyce, Canadian hammer thrower
- September 28 – Maurice Smith, Jamaican decathlete
- October 7 – Clarissa Claretti, Italian hammer thrower
- October 7 – Olesya Zykina, Russian track and field athlete
- October 16 – Maureen Griffin, American hammer thrower
- October 26 – Deriba Merga, Ethiopian long-distance runner
- November 9 – Tamicka Clarke, Bahamian sprinter
- November 14 – Naoko Sakamoto, Japanese long-distance runner
- November 19 – Yipsi Moreno, Cuban hammer thrower
- November 24 – Zoe Derham, English hammer thrower
- December 12 – Dejene Berhanu, Ethiopian runner
- December 13 – Venera Getova, Bulgarian discus thrower
- December 17 – Alexandra Papageorgiou, Greek hammer thrower

== Deaths ==
- February 11 – Paavo Yrjölä (77), Finnish decathlete (b. 1902)
- February 21 – Mario Lanzi (63), Italian middle-distance runner (b. 1914)
- March 31 – Jesse Owens (66), American sprinter (b. 1913)
- May 9 – Rolf Hansen (73), Norwegian long-distance runner (b. 1906)
- December 24 – Heikki Liimatainen (86), Finnish long-distance runner (b. 1894)
