= 1979 in the sport of athletics =

1979 in athletics

This article contains an overview of the year 1979 in athletics.

== Major events ==
=== World ===
- World Cross Country Championships
- World Cup

=== Regional ===
- African Championships
- Asian Championships
- CARIFTA Games
- Central American and Caribbean Championships
- European Indoor Championships
- Pan American Games
- South American Championships
- South American Youth Championships
- Summer Universiade

== World records ==
=== Men ===
Event	Athlete	Nation	Performance	Meeting	Place	Date
200 m	Pietro Mennea	Italy	19.72		Mexico City, Mexico	12 September
800 m	Sebastian Coe	United Kingdom	1:42.33		Oslo, Norway	5 July
1500 m	Sebastian Coe	United Kingdom	3:32.03		Zürich, Switzerland	15 August
Mile	Sebastian Coe	United Kingdom	3:48.95		Oslo, Norway	17 July
110 m hurdles	Renaldo Nehemiah	United States	13.16		San Jose, United States	14 April
110 m hurdles	Renaldo Nehemiah	United States	13.00		Westwood, Los Angeles, California, United States	6 May

=== Women ===
Event	Athlete	Nation	Performance	Meeting	Place	Date
200 m	Marita Koch	East Germany	22.02		Leipzig, East Germany	3 June
200 m	Marita Koch	East Germany	21.71		Karl-Marx-Stadt, East Germany	10 June
400 m	Marita Koch	East Germany	48.89		Potsdam, East Germany	29 July
400 m	Marita Koch	East Germany	48.60		Turin, Italy	4 August
Mile	Natalia Mărășescu	Romania	4:22.1		Auckland, New Zealand	27 January
100 m hurdles	Grażyna Rabsztyn	Poland	12.48		Warsaw, Poland	18 June
400 m hurdles	Marina Styepanova	Russia	54.78		Moscow, Russia	27 July
Javelin throw	Ruth Fuchs	East Germany	69.52 m		Dresden, East Germany	13 June
4 × 100 metres relay	Marita Koch; Romy Müller; Ingrid Auerswald; Marlies Göhr	East Germany	42.10		Karl-Marx-Stadt, East Germany	10 June
4 × 100 metres relay	Christina Lathan; Romy Müller; Ingrid Auerswald; Marlies Göhr	East Germany	42.09		Turin, Italy	4 August
4 × 200 metres relay	Raisa Makhova; Nina Zyuskova; Tatyana Prorochenko; Maria Kulchunova	Soviet Union	1:30.74		Moscow, Soviet Union	29 July

== Season's bests ==
Best marks of the year
Event	Men			Women		
Event	Athlete	Mark	Notes	Athlete	Mark	Notes
100 metres	Pietro Mennea (ITA)	10.01		Marlies Göhr (GDR) Evelyn Ashford (USA)	10.97	
200 metres	Pietro Mennea (ITA)	19.72	WR	Marita Koch (GDR)	21.71	WR
400 metres	Harald Schmid (FRG)	44.92		Marita Koch (GDR)	48.60	WR
800 metres	Sebastian Coe (GBR)	1:42.33	WR	Totka Petrova (BUL)	1:56.2	
1500 metres	Sebastian Coe (GBR)	3:32.03	WR	Totka Petrova (BUL)	3:57.4	
3000 metres	Rudy Chapa (USA)	7:37.70		Grete Waitz (NOR)	8:31.75	
5000 metres	Suleiman Nyambui (TAN)	13:12.29		—		
10,000 metres	Karl Fleschen (FRG)	27:36.8		—		
100/110 metres hurdles	Renaldo Nehemiah (USA)	13.00	WR	Grażyna Rabsztyn (POL)	12.48	WR
400 metres hurdles	Edwin Moses (USA)	47.53		Marina Styepanova (RUS)	54.78	WR
3000 metres steeplechase	Henry Rono (KEN)	8:17.92		—		
High jump	Dietmar Mögenburg (GER)	2.32 m		Rosemarie Ackermann (GDR)	1.99 m	
Pole vault	Patrick Abada (FRA) Philippe Houvion (FRA)	5.65 m		—		
Long jump	Larry Myricks (USA)	8.52 m		Brigitte Wujak (GDR)	6.90 m	
Triple jump	João Carlos de Oliveira (BRA)	17.27 m		—		
Shot put	Udo Beyer (GER)	21.74 m		Ilona Slupianek (GDR)	22.04 m	
Discus throw	Mac Wilkins (USA)	70.66 m		Evelin Jahl (GDR)	69.82 m	
Hammer throw	Sergey Litvinov (URS)	79.82 m		—		
Javelin throw	Pentti Sinersaari (FIN)	93.84 m		Ruth Fuchs (GDR)	69.52 m	WR
Decathlon	Guido Kratschmer (FRG)	8476 pts		—		
4 × 100 metres relay	United States; Mike Roberson; Harvey Glance; Bill Collins; Mel Lattany	38.30		East Germany; Christina Lathan; Romy Müller; Ingrid Auerswald; Marlies Göhr	42.09	WR
4 × 400 metres relay	United States; Herman Frazier; Bill Green; Willie Smith; Tony Darden	3:00.70		East Germany; Gabriele Kotte; Christina Lathan; Brigitte Rohde; Marita Koch	3:19.62	
