= Tânia Miranda =

Brazilian sprinter (born 1958)

Personal information
- Born: 5 March 1958 (age 68) Rio de Janeiro, Brazil
- Height: 1.60 m (5 ft 3 in)
- Weight: 50 kg (110 lb)

Sport
- Sport: Sprinting
- Event: 400 metres

Tânia Maria Miranda (born 5 March 1958) is a Brazilian sprinter. She competed in the women's 4 × 400 metres relay at the 1988 Summer Olympics.

Her personal best in the 400 metres is 52.8 seconds set in São Paulo in 1982.

== International competitions ==
Year	Competition	Venue	Position	Event	Notes
Representing Brazil
1977	South American Championships	Montevideo, Uruguay	5th (h)	400 m	58.5
1977	South American Championships	Montevideo, Uruguay	1st	4 × 400 m relay	3:49.7
1979	Pan American Games	San Juan, Puerto Rico	10th (h)	400 m	57.12
1979	Pan American Games	San Juan, Puerto Rico	4th	4 × 400 m relay	3:45.7
1979	Universiade	Mexico City, Mexico	12th (h)	200 m	24.83
1979	Universiade	Mexico City, Mexico	18th (h)	400 m	54.56
1979	South American Championships	Bucaramanga, Colombia	2nd	200 m	24.1
1979	South American Championships	Bucaramanga, Colombia	1st	400 m	54.2
1979	South American Championships	Bucaramanga, Colombia	1st	4 × 400 m relay	3:42.0
1981	Universiade	Bucharest, Romania	6th	400 m	53.19
1981	South American Championships	La Paz, Bolivia	1st	400 m	55.7
1981	South American Championships	La Paz, Bolivia	1st	4 × 400 m relay	3:49.4
1986	Ibero-American Championships	Havana, Cuba	10th (h)	400 m	56.12
1986	Ibero-American Championships	Havana, Cuba	4th	4 × 400 m relay	3:45.34
1988	Olympic Games	Seoul, South Korea	11th (h)	4 × 400 m relay	3:36.81
