= Athletics at the 1980 Summer Olympics =

Athletics at the Games of the XXII Olympiad
- Dates: 24 July – 1 August 1980
- Competitors: 959 from 70 nations

Athletics at the 1980 Summer Olympics was represented by 38 events: 24 for men and 14 for women. They were held in the Grand Arena of the Central Lenin Stadium at Luzhniki (south-western part of Moscow) between July 24 and August 1. There were a total of 959 participating athletes from 70 countries. A number of countries had boycotted the 1980 Games due to the Soviet-Afghan War.

== Medal table ==
| Rank | Nation | Gold | Silver | Bronze | Total |
|---|---|---|---|---|---|
| 1 | Soviet Union | 15 | 14 | 12 | 41 |
| 2 | East Germany | 11 | 8 | 10 | 29 |
| 3 | Great Britain | 4 | 2 | 4 | 10 |
| 4 | Italy | 3 | 0 | 1 | 4 |
| 5 | Poland | 2 | 4 | 1 | 7 |
| 6 | Ethiopia | 2 | 0 | 2 | 4 |
| 7 | Cuba | 1 | 2 | 1 | 4 |
| 8 | Czechoslovakia | 0 | 2 | 0 | 2 |
| 8 | Tanzania | 0 | 2 | 0 | 2 |
| 10 | Bulgaria | 0 | 1 | 1 | 2 |
| 10 | Finland | 0 | 1 | 1 | 2 |
| 12 | Australia | 0 | 1 | 0 | 1 |
| 12 | Netherlands | 0 | 1 | 0 | 1 |
| 12 | Spain | 0 | 1 | 0 | 1 |
| 15 | Jamaica | 0 | 0 | 2 | 2 |
| 16 | Brazil | 0 | 0 | 1 | 1 |
| 16 | France | 0 | 0 | 1 | 1 |
| Totals (17 entries) | | 38 | 39 | 37 | 114 |

== Medal summary ==
=== Men ===
| Games | Gold | | Silver | | Bronze | |
|---|---|---|---|---|---|---|
| 100 metres | Allan Wells; Great Britain | 10.25 | Silvio Leonard; Cuba | 10.25 | Petar Petrov; Bulgaria | 10.39 |
| 200 metres | Pietro Mennea; Italy | 20.19 | Allan Wells; Great Britain | 20.21 | Don Quarrie; Jamaica | 20.29 |
| 400 metres | Viktor Markin; Soviet Union | 44.60 | Rick Mitchell; Australia | 44.84 | Frank Schaffer; East Germany | 44.87 |
| 800 metres | Steve Ovett; Great Britain | 1:45.40 | Sebastian Coe; Great Britain | 1:45.85 | Nikolay Kirov; Soviet Union | 1:45.94 |
| 1500 metres | Sebastian Coe; Great Britain | 3:38.40 | Jürgen Straub; East Germany | 3:38.80 | Steve Ovett; Great Britain | 3:38.99 |
| 5000 metres | Miruts Yifter; Ethiopia | 13:20.91 | Suleiman Nyambui; Tanzania | 13:21.60 | Kaarlo Maaninka; Finland | 13:22.00 |
| 10,000 metres | Miruts Yifter; Ethiopia | 27:42.69 | Kaarlo Maaninka; Finland | 27:44.28 | Mohamed Kedir; Ethiopia | 27:44.64 |
| 110 metres hurdles | Thomas Munkelt; East Germany | 13.39 | Alejandro Casañas; Cuba | 13.40 | Aleksandr Puchkov; Soviet Union | 13.44 |
| 400 metres hurdles | Volker Beck; East Germany | 48.70 | Vasyl Arkhypenko; Soviet Union | 48.86 | Gary Oakes; Great Britain | 49.11 |
| 3000 metres steeplechase | Bronisław Malinowski; Poland | 8:09.70 | Filbert Bayi; Tanzania | 8:12.48 | Eshetu Tura; Ethiopia | 8:13.57 |
| 4 × 100 metres relay | Soviet Union; Vladimir Muravyov; Nikolay Sidorov; Andrey Prokofyev; Aleksandr Aksinin | 38.26 | Poland; Zenon Licznerski; Leszek Dunecki; Marian Woronin; Krzysztof Zwoliński | 38.33 | France; Patrick Barré; Pascal Barré; Hermann Panzo; Antoine Richard | 38.53 |
| 4 × 400 metres relay | Soviet Union; Viktor Markin; Remigijus Valiulis; Mikhail Linge; Nikolay Chernetskiy; Viktor Burakov* | 3:01.08 | East Germany; Klaus Thiele; Andreas Knebel; Frank Schaffer; Volker Beck | 3:01.26 | Italy; Roberto Tozzi; Mauro Zuliani; Stefano Malinverni; Pietro Mennea | 3:04.54 |
| Marathon | Waldemar Cierpinski; East Germany | 2:11:03 | Gerard Nijboer; Netherlands | 2:11:20 | Satymkul Dzhumanazarov; Soviet Union | 2:11:35 |
| 20 kilometres walk | Maurizio Damilano; Italy | 1:23:35.5 OR | Pyotr Pochynchuk; Soviet Union | 1:24:45.4 | Roland Wieser; East Germany | 1:25:58.2 |
| 50 kilometres walk | Hartwig Gauder; East Germany | 3:49.24 OR | Jorge Llopart; Spain | 3:51.25 | Yevgeniy Ivchenko; Soviet Union | 3:56.32 |
| High jump | Gerd Wessig; East Germany | 2.36 m WR | Jacek Wszoła; Poland | 2.31 m | Jörg Freimuth; East Germany | 2.31 m |
| Pole vault | Władysław Kozakiewicz; Poland | 5.78 m WR | Konstantin Volkov; Soviet Union; Tadeusz Ślusarski; Poland | 5.65 m | none | -- |
| Long jump | Lutz Dombrowski; East Germany | 8.54 m | Frank Paschek; East Germany | 8.21 m | Valeriy Pidluzhny; Soviet Union | 8.18 m |
| Triple jump | Jaak Uudmäe; Soviet Union | 17.35 m | Viktor Saneyev; Soviet Union | 17.24 m | João Carlos de Oliveira; Brazil | 17.22 m |
| Shot put | Vladimir Kiselyov; Soviet Union | 21.35 m OR | Aleksandr Baryshnikov; Soviet Union | 21.08 m | Udo Beyer; East Germany | 21.06 m |
| Discus throw | Viktor Rashchupkin; Soviet Union | 66.64 m | Imrich Bugár; Czechoslovakia | 66.38 m | Luis Delís; Cuba | 66.32 m |
| Hammer throw | Yuriy Sedykh; Soviet Union | 81.80 m WR | Sergey Litvinov; Soviet Union | 80.64 m | Jüri Tamm; Soviet Union | 78.96 m |
| Javelin throw | Dainis Kūla; Soviet Union | 91.20 m | Aleksandr Makarov; Soviet Union | 89.64 m | Wolfgang Hanisch; East Germany | 86.72 m |
| Decathlon | Daley Thompson; Great Britain | 8495 | Yuriy Kutsenko; Soviet Union | 8331 | Sergey Zhelanov; Soviet Union | 8135 |

=== Women ===
| Games | Gold | | Silver | | Bronze | |
|---|---|---|---|---|---|---|
| 100 metres | Lyudmila Kondratyeva; Soviet Union | 11.06 | Marlies Göhr; East Germany | 11.07 | Ingrid Auerswald; East Germany | 11.14 |
| 200 metres | Bärbel Wöckel; East Germany | 22.03 OR | Natalya Bochina; Soviet Union | 22.19 | Merlene Ottey; Jamaica | 22.20 |
| 400 metres | Marita Koch; East Germany | 48.88 OR | Jarmila Kratochvílová; Czechoslovakia | 49.46 | Christina Lathan; East Germany | 49.66 |
| 800 metres | Nadezhda Olizarenko; Soviet Union | 1:53.43 WR | Olga Mineyeva; Soviet Union | 1:54.81 | Tatyana Providokhina; Soviet Union | 1:55.46 |
| 1500 metres | Tatyana Kazankina; Soviet Union | 3:56.56 OR | Christiane Wartenberg; East Germany | 3:57.71 | Nadezhda Olizarenko; Soviet Union | 3:59.52 |
| 100 metres hurdles | Vera Komisova; Soviet Union | 12.56 OR | Johanna Klier; East Germany | 12.63 | Lucyna Langer; Poland | 12.65 |
| 4 × 100 metres relay | East Germany; Romy Müller; Bärbel Wöckel; Ingrid Auerswald; Marlies Göhr | 41.60 WR | Soviet Union; Vera Komisova; Lyudmila Maslakova; Vera Anisimova; Natalya Bochina | 42.10 | Great Britain; Heather Hunte; Kathy Smallwood; Beverley Goddard; Sonia Lannaman | 42.43 |
| 4 × 400 metres relay | Soviet Union; Tatyana Prorochenko; Tatyana Goyshchik; Nina Zyuskova; Irina Nazarova | 3:20.12 | East Germany; Barbara Krug; Gabriele Löwe; Christina Lathan; Marita Koch | 3:20.35 | Great Britain; Linsey MacDonald; Michelle Probert; Joslyn Hoyte-Smith; Donna Hartley | 3:27.74 |
| High jump | Sara Simeoni; Italy | 1.97 m OR | Urszula Kielan; Poland | 1.94 m | Jutta Kirst; East Germany | 1.94 m |
| Long jump | Tatyana Kolpakova; Soviet Union | 7.06 m | Brigitte Wujak; East Germany | 7.04 m | Tetyana Skachko; Soviet Union | 7.01 m |
| Shot put | Ilona Slupianek; East Germany | 22.41 m OR | Svetlana Krachevskaya; Soviet Union | 21.42 m | Margitta Pufe; East Germany | 21.20 m |
| Discus throw | Evelin Jahl; East Germany | 69.96 m OR | Mariya Petkova; Bulgaria | 67.90 m | Tatyana Lesovaya; Soviet Union | 67.40 m |
| Javelin throw | María Caridad Colón; Cuba | 68.40 m OR | Saida Gunba; Soviet Union | 67.76 m | Ute Hommola; East Germany | 66.56 m |
| Pentathlon | Nadiya Tkachenko; Soviet Union | 5083 WR | Olga Rukavishnikova; Soviet Union | 4937 | Olga Kuragina; Soviet Union | 4875 |

== Controversy ==
Polish gold medallist pole vaulter Władysław Kozakiewicz showed an obscene bras d'honneur gesture in all four directions to the jeering Soviet public, causing an international scandal and almost losing his medal as a result. There were numerous incidents and accusations of Soviet officials using their authority to negate marks by opponents to the point that IAAF officials found the need to look over the officials' shoulders to try to keep the events fair. There were also accusations of opening stadium gates to advantage Soviet athletes, and causing other disturbances to opposing athletes.

The Soviet Union's Jaak Uudmäe and Viktor Saneyev won the first two places in the triple jump, ahead of Brazil's world record holder João Carlos de Oliveira. Both de Oliveira and Australia's Ian Campbell produced long jumps, but they were declared fouls by the officials and not measured; in Campbell's case, his longest jump was ruled a "scrape foul", with his trailing leg touching the track during the jump. Campbell insisted he hadn't scraped, and it was alleged the officials intentionally threw out his and de Oliveira's best jumps to favor the Soviets, similarly to a number of other events. Similar allegations were made about a favorable call aiding Tatyana Kolpakova in the women's long jump.

== See also ==
- 1980 World Championships in Athletics
- 1980 in athletics (track and field)
