= Athletics at the 1979 Summer Universiade – Women's 200 metres =

The women's 200 metres event at the 1979 Summer Universiade was held at the Estadio Olimpico Universitario in Mexico City on 10, 11 and 12 September 1979.

== Medalists ==
Gold	Silver	Bronze
Marita Koch; East Germany	Kathy Smallwood; Great Britain	Bev Goddard; Great Britain

== Results ==
=== Heats ===
Wind:
Heat 1: 0.0 m/s, Heat 2: 0.0 m/s, Heat 3: +0.3 m/s, Heat 4: +0.3 m/s

Rank	Heat	Athlete	Nationality	Time	Notes
1	4	Marita Koch	East Germany	22.52	Q
2	1	Bev Goddard	Great Britain	23.09	Q
3	1	Chantal Réga	France	23.27	Q
4	3	Valerie Brisco	United States	23.47	Q
5	4	Kathy Smallwood	Great Britain	23.54	Q
6	1	Cornelia Schniggendiller	West Germany	23.60	Q
7	2	Helinä Laihorinne	Finland	23.64	Q
8	2	Marie-Pierre Philippe	France	23.67	Q
9	2	Marisa Masullo	Italy	23.68	Q
10	2	Elly Henzen	Netherlands	24.00	q
11	3	Els Vader	Netherlands	24.18	Q
12	1	Gloria Ayanlaja	Nigeria	24.23	q
13	3	Tânia Miranda	Brazil	24.54	Q
14	4	Chantal Desrosiers	Canada	24.77	Q
15	1	Kim Freakley	New Zealand	24.79	q
16	4	Hanitra Rabarivola	Madagascar	24.86	q
17	4	Alma Vázquez	Mexico	25.15	
18	3	Fosa Ibini	Nigeria	25.26	
19	2	Patricia Meigham	Guatemala	25.52	
20	1	Mayra Figueroa	Guatemala	25.85	
21	1	Than Van Tran	Vietnam	26.73	

=== Semifinals ===
Wind:
Heat 1: -0.4 m/s, Heat 2: -0.1 m/s

Rank	Heat	Athlete	Nationality	Time	Notes
1	1	Marita Koch	East Germany	22.32	Q
2	2	Chantal Réga	France	23.02	Q
3	2	Bev Goddard	Great Britain	23.03	Q
4	1	Kathy Smallwood	Great Britain	23.22	Q
5	2	Helinä Laihorinne	Finland	23.27	Q
6	1	Valerie Brisco	United States	23.38	Q
7	1	Marisa Masullo	Italy	23.65	Q
8	2	Cornelia Schniggendiller	West Germany	23.70	Q
9	1	Marie-Pierre Philippe	France	23.88	
10	2	Elly Henzen	Netherlands	24.19	
11	2	Gloria Ayanlaja	Nigeria	24.33	
12	1	Tânia Miranda	Brazil	24.83	
12	2	Chantal Desrosiers	Canada	24.83	
14	1	Hanitra Rabarivola	Madagascar	25.07	
	?	Kim Freakley	New Zealand	?	
	?	Els Vader	Netherlands	?	

=== Final ===
Wind: +1.9 m/s

Rank	Athlete	Nationality	Time	Notes
1st place, gold medalist(s)	Marita Koch	East Germany	21.91	UR
2nd place, silver medalist(s)	Kathy Smallwood	Great Britain	22.70	
3rd place, bronze medalist(s)	Bev Goddard	Great Britain	22.76	
4	Chantal Réga	France	22.80	
5	Valerie Brisco	United States	23.25	
6	Marisa Masullo	Italy	23.41	
7	Cornelia Schniggendiller	West Germany	23.58	
	Helinä Laihorinne	Finland	DNS	
