= Regine Berg =

Belgian sprinter

Medal record

Women's athletics

Representing Belgium

IAAF World Indoor Games
Silver medal – second place	1985 Paris	400 m

Regine Berg (born 5 October 1958) is a Belgian former track and field sprinter who specialised in the 400 metres. Born in Ostend, she represented her country at the Summer Olympics in 1976 and 1980. Berg won five national titles over 400 m and also two over 800 metres later in her career. She was a silver medallist at the 1985 IAAF World Indoor Games and participated three times at the European Athletics Indoor Championships.

Berg's 400 m indoor best of 53.13 seconds was the Belgian record for nearly 35 years until it was bested by Cynthia Bolingo's 52.70 at the 2019 Belgian Indoor Athletics Championships. She also shared in the 4 × 400 metres relay national record, set with Lea Alaerts, Anne Michel and Rosine Wallez at the 1980 Moscow Olympics that stood for 38 years until it was bested by the Belgian Cheetahs. Her outdoor bests are 52.29 seconds for the 400 m and 2:00.43 minutes for the 800 m.

== International competitions ==
Year	Competition	Venue	Position	Event	Notes
1976	Olympic Games	Montreal, Canada	7th (q-final)	400 m	53.14
1976	Olympic Games	Montreal, Canada	6th (heats)	4 × 400 m relay	3:32.87
1980	Olympic Games	Moscow, Soviet Union	7th	4 × 400 m relay	3:31.6
1984	European Indoor Championships	Gothenburg, Sweden	4th	400 m	53.41
1985	European Indoor Championships	Piraeus, Greece	5th	400 m	53.15
1985	World Indoor Games	Paris, France	2nd	400 m	53.81
1986	European Championships	Stuttgart, West Germany	7th (semis)	800 m	2:02.05
1989	European Indoor Championships	The Hague, Netherlands	5th (heats)	800 m	2:15.31

== National titles ==
- Belgian Athletics Championships
  - 400 metres: 1976, 1983, 1984, 1985, 1986
  - 800 metres: 1987, 1988
