= Alexis López (disambiguation) =

Alexis López is a Mexican rower.

Alexis Lopez may also refer to:

- Alexis López (field hockey), Uruguayan field hockey player, see Field hockey at the 2014 South American Games
- Alexis López (athlete), Colombian athlete, see Athletics at the 1977 Central American Games
- Alexis Lopez (singer), an American Idol (season 1) contestant — semifinalist
