= Woy =

Woy or WOY may refer to:

- Wander Over Yonder, American television series
- Asele Woy, Nigerian sprinter
- Roy Jenkins, British politician sometimes nicknamed “Woy”
- Roy Hodgson, British football manager sometimes nicknamed "Woy"
- Woy Woy, New South Wales, Australian town
- week of the year
- Woy Woy railway station (Station code: WOY), a railway station on the Main Northern line in New South Wales, Australia

== See also ==
- WOYS
