= Rossana Lombardo =

Italian sprinter (born 1962)

Personal information
- Nationality: Italian
- Born: 9 July 1962 (age 64) Formia, Italy

Sport
- Sport: Athletics
- Event: 400 m

Rossana Lombardo (born 9 July 1962) is an Italian former sprinter. She competed in the women's 4 × 400 metres relay at the 1980 Summer Olympics.
