= Zonia Meigham =

Guatemalan sprinter

Personal information
- Full name: Zonia Patricia Meigham Juárez
- Nationality: Guatemalan
- Born: 11 June 1954 (age 72)
- Height: 1.70 m (5 ft 7 in)
- Weight: 56 kg (123 lb)

Sport
- Sport: Sprinting
- Event: 400 metres
Medal record
Representing Guatemala
Central American Games
| Gold medal – first place | 1973 Guatemala City | 400m |
| Gold medal – first place | 1977 San Salvador | 4x100m relay |
| Silver medal – second place | 1973 Guatemala City | 200m |
| Silver medal – second place | 1973 Guatemala City | 4x100m relay |
| Silver medal – second place | 1973 Guatemala City | 4x400m relay |
| Bronze medal – third place | 1973 Guatemala City | 100m |

Zonia Patricia Meigham Juárez (born 11 June 1954) is a Guatemalan sprinter. She competed in the women's 400 metres at the 1984 Summer Olympics.

== International competitions ==
| Year | Competition | Venue | Position | Event | Notes |
Representing Guatemala
| 1971 | Central American Championships | San José, Costa Rica | 3rd | 100 m hurdles | 18.1 |
| 1971 | Central American Championships | San José, Costa Rica | 3rd | 4 × 100 m relay | 50.1 |
| 1971 | Central American Championships | San José, Costa Rica | 3rd | High jump | 1.35 m |
| 1973 | Central American Games | Guatemala City, Guatemala | 3rd | 100 m | |
| 1973 | Central American Games | Guatemala City, Guatemala | 2nd | 200 m | |
| 1973 | Central American Games | Guatemala City, Guatemala | 1st | 400 m | 57.6 |
| 1973 | Central American Games | Guatemala City, Guatemala | 2nd | 4 × 100 m relay | |
| 1973 | Central American Games | Guatemala City, Guatemala | 2nd | 4 × 400 m relay | |
| 1974 | Central American and Caribbean Games | Santo Domingo, Dominican Republic | 16th (h) | 100 m | 12.57 |
| 1974 | Central American and Caribbean Games | Santo Domingo, Dominican Republic | 10th (h) | 200 m | 25.31 |
| 1974 | Central American and Caribbean Games | Santo Domingo, Dominican Republic | 11th (h) | 400 m | 59.12 |
| 1975 | Pan American Games | Mexico City, Mexico | 13th (sf) | 200 m | 25.44 |
| 1975 | Pan American Games | Mexico City, Mexico | 10th (sf) | 400 m | 56.23 |
| 1977 | Central American Games | San Salvador, El Salvador | 1st | 4 × 100 m relay | 50.10 |
| 1979 | Universiade | Mexico City, Mexico | 19th (h) | 200 m | 25.52 |
| 1979 | Universiade | Mexico City, Mexico | 26th (h) | 400 m | 58.84 |
| 1980 | Central American Championships | Guatemala City, Guatemala | 1st | 400 m | 58.1 |
| 1980 | Central American Championships | Guatemala City, Guatemala | 1st | 800 m | 2:21.2 |
| 1980 | Central American Championships | Guatemala City, Guatemala | 1st | 400 m hurdles | 65.5 |
| 1982 | Central American and Caribbean Games | Havana, Cuba | 8th | 200 m | 25.34 |
| 1983 | World Championships | Helsinki, Finland | 26th (qf) | 400 m | 59.85 |
| 1983 | World Championships | Helsinki, Finland | 20th | Heptathlon | 3955 pts |
| 1984 | Olympic Games | Los Angeles, United States | 23rd (h) | 400 m | 55.64 |
| 1984 | Olympic Games | Los Angeles, United States | 23rd (h) | 800 m | 2:14.17 |
| 1984 | Central American Championships | Guatemala City, Guatemala | 2nd | 200 m | 24.8 |
| 1984 | Central American Championships | Guatemala City, Guatemala | 1st | 400 m | 56.2 |
| 1984 | Central American Championships | Guatemala City, Guatemala | 2nd | 800 m | 2:15.3 |
| 1984 | Central American Championships | Guatemala City, Guatemala | 1st | 4 × 100 m relay | 47.9 |
| 1984 | Central American Championships | Guatemala City, Guatemala | 1st | 4 × 400 m relay | 3:58.3 |

== Personal bests ==
Outdoor

- 400 metres – 55.2h (1985)
- 800 metres – 2:14.17 (1984)
