= Athletics at the 1981 Summer Universiade =

Athletics at the XI Summer Universiade
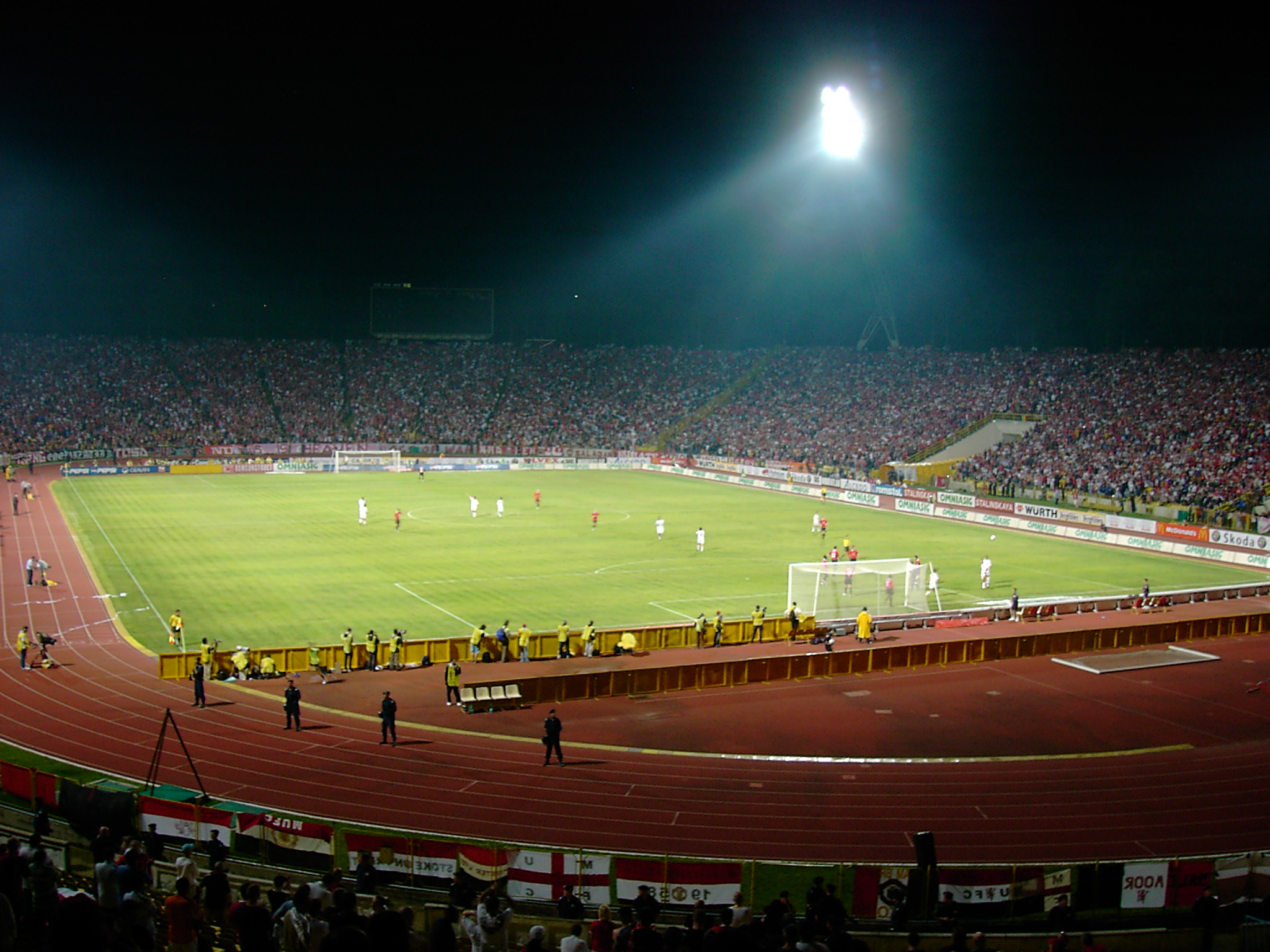
- The host stadium for the events
- Dates: 21–26 July 1981
- Host city: Bucharest, Romania
- Venue: Stadionul Naţional
- Level: University
- Events: 39
- Records set: 14 Games records

The athletics competition at the 1981 Summer Universiade was held at the National Stadium in Bucharest, Romania, in July 1981. The programme featured 23 events for men and 16 for women. A total of fourteen Universiade records were broken during the 1981 Games.

The Soviet Union was the most successful nation medals-wise as it topped the table with eleven gold medals and 32 in total. The United States, runners-up in the competition, also took eleven gold medals, but had a lesser haul overall with 17 medal performances. East Germany and Italy had the next greatest number of gold medals, with four and three respectively, but it was the host nation Romania which was third place in the total tally, having won two golds but fifteen medals overall.

The competition featured a men's marathon race and a 20 kilometres road walk for the first time, expanding the programme outside of the usual track and field stadium. The women's 3000 metres also made its first Games appearance, having been previously held at only the 1975 World University Championships in Athletics competition. The 400 metres hurdles and 4×400 metres relay for women were other new additions to the Universiade athletics contest, while the women's pentathlon was replaced with the more extensive heptathlon event.

Saïd Aouita demonstrated his potential with a win in the 1500 metres in a Games record time. The 1980 Olympic gold medallists Dainis Kūla (javelin) and Maurizio Damilano (20 km walk) won their respective disciplines. On the women's side, reigning Olympic champions Tatyana Kolpakova and Sara Simeoni won the long jump and high jump events. Konstantin Volkov, the 1980 Olympic silver medallist, was another high-profile name and he set a record to win the men's pole vault. Romanian Doina Melinte won the women's 800 metres gold and 1500 m silver and later went on to win medals of those colours at the 1984 Summer Olympics. An unusual mistake occurred in the men's 10,000 metres competition, as the athletes ran a further lap of the circuit than intended – resulting in a total distance of 10,400 m.

== Medal summary ==
=== Men's events ===
Event	Gold		Silver		Bronze	
100 metres (wind: -0.5 m/s)	Mel Lattany (USA)	10.18	Calvin Smith (USA)	10.26	Ernest Obeng (GHA)	10.37
200 metres (wind: +0.4 m/s)	Yuriy Naumenko (URS)	20.79	István Nagy (HUN)	20.83	Georges Kablan Degnan (CIV)	20.97
400 metres	Cliff Wiley (USA)	45.18	Walter McCoy (USA)	45.33	Gerson de Souza (BRA)	45.91
800 metres	Andreas Hauck (GDR)	1:50.12	Sotirios Moutsanas (GRE)	1:50.20	Pavel Troshchilo (URS)	1:50.26
1500 metres	Saïd Aouita (MAR)	3:38.43 GR	Vinko Pokrajčić (YUG)	3:39.83	Amar Brahmia (ALG)	3:39.85
5000 metres	Doug Padilla (USA)	13:49.95	Jozef Lenčéš (TCH)	13:50.34	Frank Zimmermann (FRG)	13:50.84
10,000 metres †	Toomas Turb (URS)	29:42.83	Gyorgi Marko (ROM)	29:51.13	Dave Murphy (GBR)	29:51.27
Marathon	Ivan Kovalchuk (URS)	2:22:14 GR	Herbert Wills (USA)	2:23:22	Gheorghe Buruiana (ROM)	2:24:45
110 metres hurdles (wind: +1.0 m/s)	Larry Cowling (USA)	13.65	Pal Palffy (ROM)	13.73	Georgiy Shabanov (URS)	13.82
400 metres hurdles	David Lee (USA)	49.05	Dmitriy Shkarupin (URS)	49.52	Antônio Dias Ferreira (BRA)	50.04
3000 metres steeplechase	John Gregorek (USA)	8:21.26 GR	Tommy Ekblom (FIN)	8:21.93	Mariano Scartezzini (ITA)	8:28.03
4 × 100 metres relay	United States (USA); Mel Lattany; Anthony Ketchum; Jason Grimes; Calvin Smith	38.70	Soviet Union (URS); Andrey Shlyapnikov; Nikolay Sidorov; Aleksandr Aksinin; Vladimir Muravyov	38.94	France (FRA); Philippe Le Joncour; Stéphane Adam; Gabriel Brothier; Aldo Canti	39.50
4 × 400 metres relay	Soviet Union (URS); Aleksandr Zolotaryev; Vitaliy Fedotov; Viktor Burakov; Viktor Markin; Aleksandr Kurochkin	3:02.75	United States (USA); David Lee; Anthony Ketchum; David Patrick; Walter McCoy	3:03.01	Brazil (BRA); Katsuhiko Nakaya; Paulo Roberto Correia; Gérson de Souza; António Euzebio Ferreira	3:06.79
20 kilometres walk	Maurizio Damilano (ITA)	1:26:47 GR	Carlo Mattioli (ITA)	1:28:10	Liodor Pescaru (ROM)	1:28:56
High jump	Leo Williams (USA)	2.25 m	Zhu Jianhua (CHN)	2.25 m	Gerd Nagel (FRG)	2.25 m
Pole vault	Konstantin Volkov (URS)	5.75 m GR	Vladimir Polyakov (URS)	5.70 m	Philippe Houvion (FRA)	5.65 m
Long jump	László Szalma (HUN)	8.23 m (w)	Liu Yuhuang (CHN)	8.11 m	Ubaldo Duany (CUB)	8.10 m
Triple jump	Zou Zhenxian (CHN)	17.32 m GR	Béla Bakosi (HUN)	16.97 m	Keith Connor (GBR)	16.88 m
Shot put	Mike Carter (USA)	20.19 m	Detlef Mortag (GDR)	19.35 m	Dalibor Vašíček (TCH)	19.20 m
Discus throw	Armin Lemme (GDR)	65.90 m GR	Wolfgang Warnemünde (GDR)	63.54 m	Ion Zamfirache (ROM)	63.40 m
Hammer throw	Klaus Ploghaus (FRG)	77.74 m GR	Jüri Tamm (URS)	76.54 m	Igor Nikulin (URS)	75.24 m
Javelin throw	Dainis Kūla (URS)	89.52 m GR	Gerald Weiß (GDR)	87.80 m	Heino Puuste (URS)	87.22 m
Decathlon	Aleksandr Shablenko (URS)	8055 pts	Sergey Zhelanov (URS)	8013 pts	Georg Werthner (AUT)	7825 pts

- † = The 10,000 m race was held for one lap too many, resulting in a final distance of 10,400 m.

=== Women's events ===
Event	Gold		Silver		Bronze	
100 metres	Bev Goddard (GBR)	11.35	Olga Zolotaryova (URS)	11.51	Olga Nasonova (URS)	11.54
200 metres (wind: +1.0 m/s)	Kathy Smallwood (GBR)	22.78	Marisa Masullo (ITA)	23.36	Irina Nazarova (URS)	23.45
400 metres	Irina Baskakova (URS)	51.45	Nadezhda Lyalina (URS)	51.56	Sophie Malbranque (FRA)	52.52
800 metres	Doina Melinte (ROM)	1:57.81	Gabriella Dorio (ITA)	1:58.99	Tudorita Morutan (ROM)	1:59.30
1500 metres	Gabriella Dorio (ITA)	4:05.35 GR	Doina Melinte (ROM)	4:05.74	Olga Dvirna (URS)	4:06.39
3000 metres	Breda Pergar (YUG)	8:53.78 GR	Valentina Ilyinykh (URS)	8:54.23	Maria Radu (ROM)	8:58.58
100 metres hurdles (wind: -0.6 m/s)	Stephanie Hightower (USA)	13.03	Mariya Kemenchezhiy (URS)	13.13	Elżbieta Rabsztyn (POL)	13.31
400 metres hurdles	Anna Kastyetskaya (URS)	55.52 GR	Birgit Sonntag (GDR)	55.90	Tatyana Zubova (URS)	57.07
4 × 100 metres relay	United States (USA); Michelle Glover; Carol Lewis; Jackie Washington; Benita Fitzgerald	43.66	Great Britain (GBR); Yvette Wray; Kathy Smallwood; Sue Hearnshaw; Beverley Goddard	43.86	Italy (ITA); Antonella Capriotti; Carla Mercurio; Patrizia Lombardo; Marisa Masullo	44.43
4 × 400 metres relay	Soviet Union (URS); Ana Ambrazienė; Irina Baskakova; Natalya Alyoshina; Irina Nazarova	3:26.65	United States (USA); Kelia Bolton; Leann Warren; Robin Campbell; Delisa Walton-Floyd	3:29.50	Romania (ROM); Steluța Vintila; Stela Manea; Ibolya Korodi; Elena Tărîţă	3:30.47
High jump	Sara Simeoni (ITA)	1.96 m GR	Lyudmila Andonova (BUL)	1.94 m	Tamara Bykova (URS)	1.94 m
Long jump	Tatyana Kolpakova (URS)	6.83 m	Anişoara Cuşmir (ROM)	6.77 m	Valy Ionescu (ROM)	6.61 m
Shot put	Helma Knorscheidt (GDR)	20.24 m	Ines Müller (GDR)	19.66 m	Lyudmila Savina (URS)	18.50 m
Discus throw	Florenţa Crăciunescu (ROM)	67.48 m GR	Petra Sziegaud (GDR)	64.14 m	Mariana Ionescu (ROM)	61.84 m
Javelin throw	Petra Felke (GDR)	65.20 m	Karin Smith (USA)	64.12 m	Mayra Vila (CUB)	63.88 m
Heptathlon	Małgorzata Guzowska (POL)	6198 pts	Nadezhda Vinogradova (URS)	6133 pts	Corina Tifrea (ROM)	6033 pts

== Medal table ==
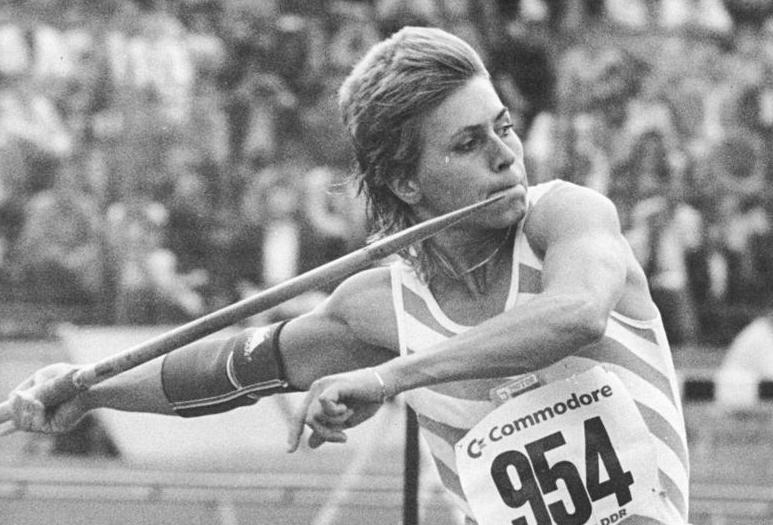
Petra Felke won her first international gold in the javelin and went on to win at the 1988 Summer Olympics.

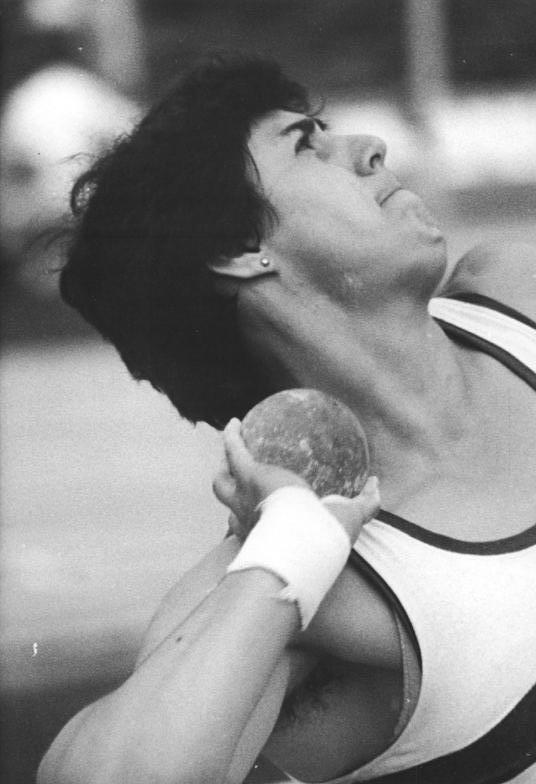
1980 Olympian Ines Müller took silver in the women's shot put.

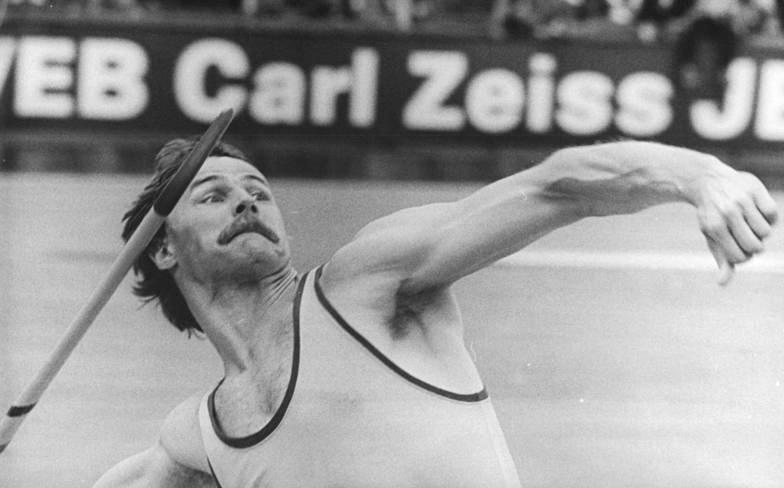
Javelin runner-up Gerald Weiß was one of many East Germans to medal in the throws.

* Host nation (Romania)

Rank	Nation	Gold	Silver	Bronze	Total
1	Soviet Union (URS)	11	10	11	32
2	United States (USA)	11	6	0	17
3	East Germany (GDR)	4	5	0	9
4	Italy (ITA)	3	3	2	8
5	Romania (ROM)*	2	4	9	15
6	Great Britain (GBR)	2	1	2	5
7	China (CHN)	1	2	0	3
7	Hungary (HUN)	1	2	0	3
7	Yugoslavia (YUG)	1	2	0	3
10	West Germany (FRG)	1	0	2	3
11	Poland (POL)	1	0	1	2
12	Morocco (MAR)	1	0	0	1
13	Bulgaria (BUL)	0	1	0	1
13	Czechoslovakia (TCH)	0	1	0	1
13	Finland (FIN)	0	1	0	1
13	Greece (GRE)	0	1	0	1
17	Brazil (BRA)	0	0	3	3
17	France (FRA)	0	0	3	3
19	Cuba (CUB)	0	0	2	2
20	Algeria (ALG)	0	0	1	1
20	Austria (AUT)	0	0	1	1
20	Ghana (GHA)	0	0	1	1
20	Ivory Coast (CIV)	0	0	1	1
Totals (23 entries)		39	39	39	117

== See also ==
- FISU World University Games
- University and college sport
