= Stan Vinson =

Stanley Vinson
Personal information
- Born: March 5, 1952
- Height: 1.88 m (6 ft 2 in)
- Weight: 68 kg (150 lb)

Sport
- Sport: Running
- Event: 400 meters

Stan Vinson
Medal record

Men's Athletics

1979 Spatakiad
Gold medal – first place	1979 Spartakiad	400 metres
Gold medal – first place	1979 Spartakiad	4×400 metres relay

Stan Vinson (born March 5, 1952) is a retired American 400 metres runner who was a member of a team that broke the world record for the 4×440 yards relay.

== Career ==
Vinson achieved the men's world record for the 4×440 yards relay on 18 July 1975 with a time of 3:02.4 minutes in Durham, North Carolina.

Vinson also won medals in the Soviet Union's Spartakiad:

- Gold in the 400 m in 1979
- Gold in the 4×400 m relay in 1979

Vinson also won medals in the 400m, 400m hurdles and 110m hurdles in the USA–USSR Track and Field Dual Meet Series:

- Bronze in the 110m Hurdles 1982
- Gold in the 400m 1979
- Gold in the 4×400m relay 1979
- Gold in the 400m 1978
- Gold in the 4×400m relay 1978
- Gold in the 400m 1977
- Gold in the 4×400m relay 1977
- Gold in the 400m 1975
- Silver in the 4×400m relay 1975

In 1976, Vinson attempted to make the United States Olympics team in the 400 m but was eliminated in the semi-finals.

== Personal ==
Vinson attended Eastern Michigan University, graduating in 1975.

As a member of the athletics team, he won the following national collegiate titles:

- NCAA D II Outdoor 4×400 yards Relay in 1972
- NCAA D I Indoor 600 yards in 1974
- NCAA D I Indoor 600 yards in 1975

== Accolades and Awards ==
In 2007, Vinson was inducted into the Eastern Michigan University Athletic Hall of Fame.

== Rankings ==
Vinson was ranked among the top ten best in the USA and the world in the 400 m sprint from 1975 to 1979, according to the votes of the experts of Track and Field News.

400 meters
Year	World rank	US rank
1975	7th	3rd
1976	-	-
1977	8th	4th
1978	7th	6th
1979	-	7th
