= Lea Alaerts =

Belgian sprinter

Personal information
- Nationality: Belgian
- Born: 6 April 1954 (age 71) Leuven, Belgium

Sport
- Sport: Sprinting
- Event: 100 metres

Lea Alaerts (born 6 April 1954) is a Belgian sprinter. She competed in the women's 100 metres at the 1976 Summer Olympics. She and her teammates, Regine Berg, Anne Michel and Rosine Wallez set the Belgian record in the 4 × 400 metres relay at the 1980 Summer Olympics in Moscow with a time of 3:30.7.

Lea won 7 Belgian National 100m titles between, 1972-80. She also won 5 200m national titles. Also winning the 400m in 1973, and 100m hurdles in 1978.

In 1975, Budapest, Lea won the European Cup Semifinal, 100m title.
