= Acacia Mate =

Mozambican sprinter

Personal information
- Nationality: Mozambican

Sport
- Sport: Sprinting
- Event: 400 metres

Acacia Mate is a Mozambican sprinter. She competed in the women's 400 metres at the 1980 Summer Olympics. She was the first woman to represent Mozambique at the Olympics.
