= Mary Akinyemi =

Nigerian sprinter

Personal information
- Nationality: Nigerian
- Born: 28 August 1954 (age 71) Erinla, British Nigeria

Sport
- Sport: Sprinting
- Event: 400 metres

Mary Akinyemi-Akinkuowo (born 28 August 1954) is a Nigerian former sprinter. She competed in the women's 400 metres at the 1980 Summer Olympics.
