= Ibolya Korodi =

Romanian sprinter

Personal information
- Nationality: Romanian
- Born: 18 July 1957 (age 68) Arad, Romania

Sport
- Sport: Sprinting
- Event: 4 × 400 metres relay
Medal record
Representing Romania
Summer Universiade
Bronze medal – third place	1981 Bucharest	4x400m relay

Ibolya Korodi (born 18 July 1957) is a Romanian former sprinter of Hungarian descent. She competed in the women's 4 × 400 metres relay at the 1980 Summer Olympics.
