= Daniela Porcelli =

Italian sprinter

Personal information
- Nationality: Italian
- Born: 15 October 1961 (age 64) Cagliari, Italy

Sport
- Sport: Sprinting
- Event: 4 × 400 metres relay

Daniela Porcelli (born 15 October 1961) is an Italian sprinter. She competed in the women's 4 × 400 metres relay at the 1980 Summer Olympics.
