= Athletics at the 1977 Central American Games =

Athletics at the II Central American Games
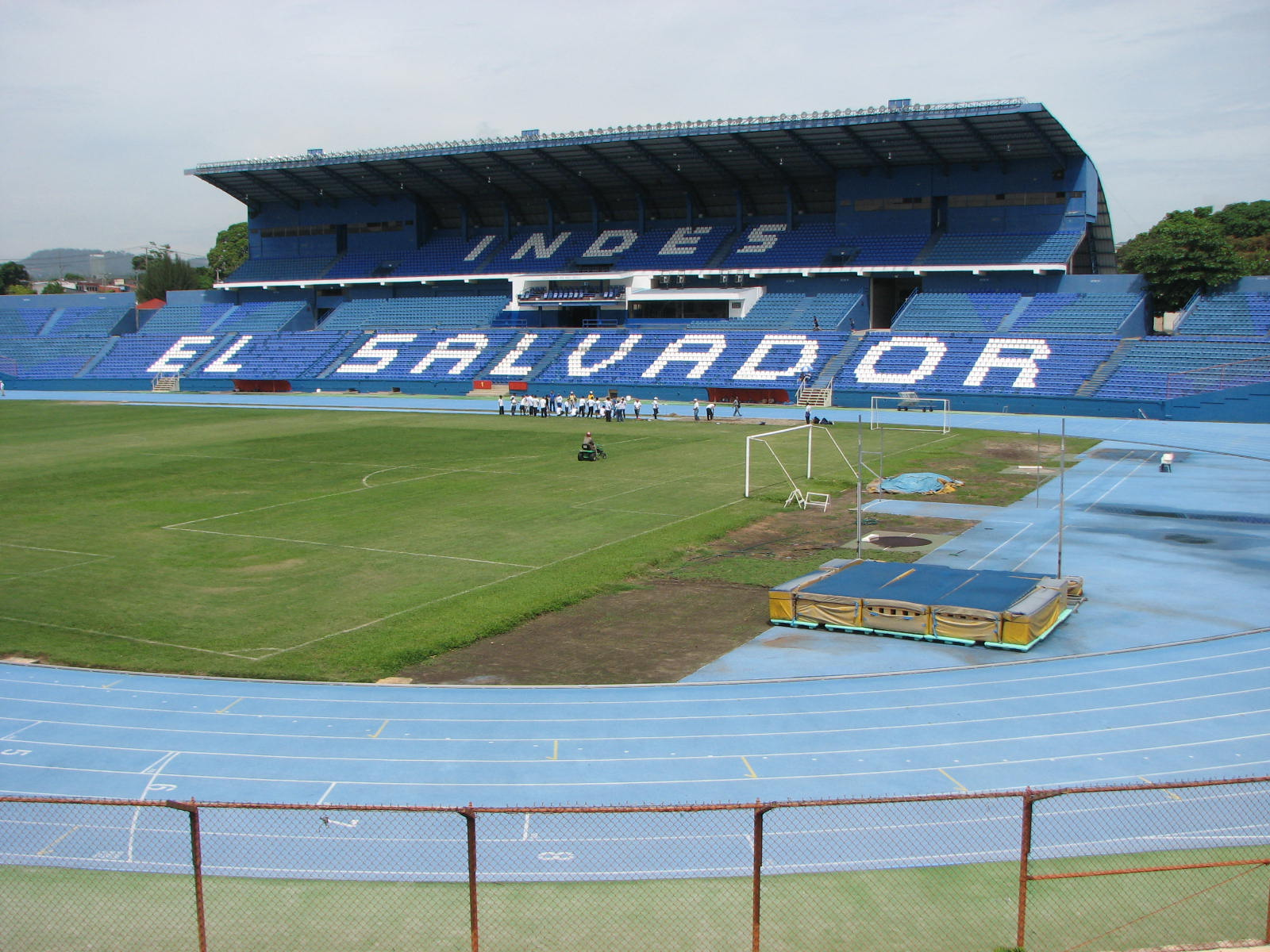
- National Stadium Jorge "Magico" Gonzalez, located in San Salvador, El Salvador
- Dates: November 29 - December 1
- Host city: San Salvador, El Salvador
- Venue: Estadio Flor Blanca
- Level: Senior
- Events: 37 (23 men, 14 women)

Athletics competitions at the 1977 Central American Games were held at the Estadio Flor Blanca in San Salvador, El Salvador, between November 29 and December 1, 1977.

A total of 37 events were contested, 23 by men and 14 by women.

== Medal summary ==
Gold medal winners and their results were published. A complete list of medal winners can be found on the MásGoles webpage. Gold medalists were also published in other sources. A couple of results can be found in the archives of Costa Rican newspaper La Nación.

=== Men ===
Event	Gold		Silver		Bronze	
100 metres	Rolando Mendieta (PAN)	10.5	Aldo Salandra (ESA)	10.6	Marvin Ramírez (CRC)	10.8
200 metres	Ricardo Davis (CRC)	21.78	Emilio Eva (GUA)		Irwin Weeks (PAN)	
400 metres	Carlos Abott (CRC)	48.36	Emilio Eva (GUA)	49.43	Francisco López (ESA)	49.63
800 metres	Cristóbal Méndez (PAN)	1:52.9	Francisco López (ESA)	1:54.1	Jesús Salazar (CRC)	1:54.7
1500 metres	Roger Zúñiga (CRC)	3:59.7	Victoriano López (GUA)	4:00.6	Cristóbal Méndez (PAN)	4:02.5
5000 metres	Celso Garro (CRC)	14:47.18	Virgilio Herrera (GUA)		Victoriano López (GUA)	
10,000 metres	Rafael Ángel Pérez (CRC)	32:05.6	Virgilio Herrera (GUA)	32:44.5	José Gramajo (GUA)	33:10.2
Marathon	Carlos Tóchez (ESA)	2:43:51	Rafael Sandi (CRC)		Agustín Castillo (NCA)	
110 metres hurdles	Amos Milwood (PAN)	14.72	Arnold Monge (CRC)		Salvador Ruiz (PAN)	
400 metres hurdles	Amos Milwood (PAN)	54.02?	Antonio Beard (PAN)		Ernesto Vides (ESA)	
3000 metres steeplechase	Jesús Jerez (GUA)	9:33.72	Enrique Guevara (CRC)		Roger Zúñiga (CRC)	
4 x 100 metres relay	Costa Rica; Roberto McFarlane; Ricardo Davis; Marvin Ramírez; Vance Parks	42.21	Panama	42.25	El Salvador	42.65
4 x 400 metres relay	Panama; Antonio Beard; Cristóbal Méndez; Salvador Ruiz; Amos Milwood	3:18.28	Guatemala; Edgar Balsells; Salomón Rowe; Emilio Eva; Sergio Aguilar		Costa Rica	
20 Kilometres Road Walk	Alexis López (athlete) (CRC)	1:52:05.3	Edgar López (CRC)	1:53:35.4	Dorindo Cortez (PAN)	1:57:47.5
High jump	Rodolfo Madrigal (CRC)	2.08	Carlos Abaunza (NCA)		Roberto McFarlane (CRC)	
Pole vault	Héctor Olano (ESA)	3.60	Daniel Montes de Oca (CRC)	3.50	Andrés Houdelot (ESA)	3.50
Long jump	Salomón Rowe (GUA)	7.65	David Green (NCA)		Héctor Murillo (PAN)	
Triple jump	Héctor Murillo (PAN)	14.91?	Jaime Carter (PAN)		Samuel Abarca (ESA)	
Shot put	Iván Turcios (NCA)	14.67	Enrique Montiel (NCA)		René Lynch (PAN)	
Discus throw	Iván Turcios (NCA)	45.08?	Enrique Montiel (NCA)		René Lynch (PAN)	
Hammer throw	Juan Pedro Varela (ESA)	48.20	Víctor Taracena (GUA)		Orlando Ortega (NCA)	
Javelin throw	Donald Vélez (NCA)	63.40^{*}	Eustacio de León (PAN)		Rodolfo Méndez (PAN)	
Decathlon	Roberto McFarlane (CRC)	6324	Rudy Aguilar (ESA)	5687	Daniel Montes de Oca (CRC)	5437

=== Women ===
Event	Gold		Silver		Bronze	
100 metres	Maritza Escalona (PAN)	12.0	Darcy Bryant (CRC)	12.1	Zaida Núñez (PAN)	12.3
200 metres	Maritza Escalona (PAN)	25.1	Zaida Núñez (PAN)	25.2	Darcy Bryant (CRC)	25.4
400 metres	Marlin Downs (NCA)	57.38	Marisol Caballeros (PAN)		Verónica Pearce (GUA)	
800 metres	Thelma Zúñiga (CRC)	2:19.9	Maritza Payne (PAN)	2:24.15	Miriam Vasquez (GUA)	
1500 metres	Thelma Zúñiga (CRC)	5:01.3	Norma Franco (ESA)	5:13.7	Miriam Vasquez (GUA)	5:29.2
100 metres hurdles	Mayra Figueroa (GUA)	15.6?	Ann Quast (GUA)		Mercedes Freer (CRC)	
4 x 100 metres relay	Costa Rica; Darcy Bryant; Ana Baylis; Severna Crawford; Aracely Arias	49.84	Guatemala; Shera Hall; Patricia Ríos; Patricia Meighan; Mayra Figueroa	50.10	El Salvador; Rhina Franco; Zoila Baires; Miriam Orellana; Lilian Monroy	50.67
4 x 400 metres relay	Panama		Guatemala		Costa Rica	
High jump	Severna Crawford (CRC)	1.53	Ann Quast (GUA)		Amapola Arimany (GUA)	
Long jump	Silvia Brenes (GUA)	5.11?	Lilian Monroy (ESA)		Miriam Orellana (ESA)	
Shot put	Regina de Hernández (ESA)	11.89	Martha Ubeda (NCA)		Mercedes Centeno (GUA)	
Discus throw	Patricia Comandari (ESA)	34.60	Regina de Hernández (ESA)		Celia de Martinez (GUA)	
Javelin throw^{*}	Gladys Torres (PAN)	39.14	Odilia Chavarría (CRC)	36.76	Eva María Alpizar (CRC)	36.62
Pentathlon	Lucrécia Aragón (GUA)	2553	Amapola Arimany (GUA)		Aracely Arias (CRC)	

== Notes ==
^{*}: Original model javelin.

== Medal table ==
* Host nation (El Salvador)

Rank	Nation	Gold	Silver	Bronze	Total
1	Costa Rica (CRC)	13	7	11	31
2	Panama (PAN)	10	7	9	26
3	Guatemala (GUA)	5	12	8	25
4	El Salvador (ESA)*	5	6	7	18
5	Nicaragua (NIC)	4	5	2	11
Totals (5 entries)		37	37	37	111
