= Malena Andonova =

Bulgarian sprinter

Personal information
- Nationality: Bulgarian
- Born: 6 July 1957 (age 68) Sofia, Bulgaria

Sport
- Sport: Sprinting
- Event: 400 metres

Malena Ivanova Andonova (Bulgarian: Малена Андонова; born 6 July 1957) is a Bulgarian former sprinter. She competed in the women's 400 metres at the 1980 Summer Olympics.
