= Asele Woy =

Nigerian sprinter

Personal information
- Full name: Asele Disep Woy
- Nationality: Nigerian
- Born: 3 January 1959 (age 67) Emoh Abua, Nigeria

Sport
- Sport: Sprinting
- Event: 4 × 400 metres relay
Medal record
Women's athletics
Representing Nigeria
African Championships
Bronze medal – third place	1979 Dakar	4×400 m

Asele Disep Woy (born 3 January 1959) is a Nigerian sprinter. She competed in the women's 4 × 400 metres relay at the 1980 Summer Olympics.
