= Wardell Gilbreath =

American sprinter

Personal information
- Born: August 29, 1954 (age 71) Amarillo, Texas, United States

Sport
- Sport: Track and field
Medal record
Representing United States
Summer Universiade
Gold medal – first place	1973 Moscow	4x100m relay
Bronze medal – third place	1973 Moscow	200m

Wardell Gilbreath (born August 29, 1954) is an American retired sprinter.

Gilbreath was an All-American sprinter for the Arizona Wildcats track and field team, finishing 3rd in the 200 meters at the 1974 NCAA Division I Outdoor Track and Field Championships and 1976 NCAA Division I Outdoor Track and Field Championships.

Gilbreath first competed for Amarillo High School and New Mexico Junior College, where he was a national junior college champion, before transferring to Arizona. He earned gold and bronze medals at the 1973 World University Games. In 1974, then-President John P. Schaefer admitted that Gilbreath was recruited to Arizona against National Collegiate Athletic Association rules.

He majored in physical education.
