= Bonka Dimova =

Bulgarian sprinter

Personal information
- Nationality: Bulgarian
- Born: 15 March 1956 (age 69)

Sport
- Sport: Sprinting
- Event: 4 × 400 metres relay

Bonka Dimova (Bulgarian: Бонка Димова, born 15 March 1956) is a Bulgarian sprinter. She competed in the women's 4 × 400 metres relay at the 1980 Summer Olympics.
