= Lyudmila Chernova =

Russian sprinter

Personal information
- Nationality: Russian
- Born: 30 November 1955 (age 69)

Sport
- Sport: Sprinting
- Event: 400 metres

Lyudmila Chernova (born 30 November 1955) is a Russian sprinter. She competed in the women's 400 metres at the 1980 Summer Olympics.
