= Viktor Burakov =

Ukrainian sprinter (1955–2025)

Personal information
- Born: 30 May 1955 Dymytrov, Soviet Union
- Died: 24 July 2025 (aged 70)

Sport
- Sport: Track and field
Medal record
Representing Soviet Union
Olympic Games
Gold medal – first place	1980 Moscow	4x400m relay
Summer Universiade
Gold medal – first place	1981 Bucharest	4x400m relay

Viktor Volodymyrovych Burakov (Ukrainian: Віктор Володимирович Бураков; 30 May 1955 – 24 July 2025) was a Ukrainian sprinter who competed in the 1980 Summer Olympics. He represented the Soviet Union in the men's 400 metres event and the men's 4x400 metres relay. He helped his team place first in the semifinals for the 4x400 metres relay, but did not participate in the finals because of an injury. His team ended up winning gold. Burakov was an Honoured Master of Sports of the USSR.

Burakov was married to another Soviet Olympic athlete, Tatyana Prorochenko. He died on 24 July 2025, at the age of 70.
