= Maria Samungi =

Romanian sprinter (1950–2025)

Personal information
- Nationality: Romanian
- Born: 28 August 1950 Hurezani, Romania
- Died: 24 September 2025 (aged 75) Bucharest, Romania

Sport
- Sport: Sprinting
- Event: 400 metres

Maria Samungi (28 August 1950 – 24 September 2025) was a Romanian sprinter. She competed in the women's 400 metres at the 1980 Summer Olympics.

Samungi died on 24 September 2025, at the age of 75.
