= Grażyna Oliszewska =

Polish sprinter

Personal information
- Nationality: Polish
- Born: 22 October 1959 (age 65)

Sport
- Sport: Sprinting
- Event: 400 metres

Grażyna Oliszewska (born 22 October 1959) is a Polish sprinter. She competed in the women's 400 metres at the 1980 Summer Olympics.
