= Anne Michel =

Belgian sprinter (1959–2023)

Personal information
- Nationality: Belgian
- Born: 30 October 1959 Waimes, Belgium
- Died: 21 November 2023 (aged 64) Luxembourg, Belgium

Sport
- Sport: Sprinting
- Event: 400 metres

Anne Michel (30 October 1959 – 21 November 2023) was a Belgian sprinter. She competed in the women's 400 metres at the 1980 Summer Olympics. She also shares in the 4 × 400 metres relay national record, set with Lea Alaerts, Regine Berg and Rosine Wallez at the 1980 Moscow Olympics. Michel died on 21 November 2023, at the age of 64.
