= Donna Hartley =

British sprinter (1955–2013)

Donna Hartley née Murray
Personal information
- Nationality: British (English)
- Born: 1 May 1955 Southampton, England
- Died: 7 June 2013 (aged 58) Elsecar, England
- Height: 170 cm (5 ft 7 in)
- Weight: 55 kg (121 lb)

Sport
- Sport: Athletics
- Event: Sprints
- Club: Southampton & Eastleigh A.A.C.
Medal record
Representing Great Britain
Women's Athletics
Olympic Games
Bronze medal – third place	1980 Moscow	4x400 m relay
Representing England
Commonwealth Games
Gold medal – first place	1978 Edmonton	400 m
Gold medal – first place	1978 Edmonton	4x400 m relay

Donna Marie Louise Hartley MBE (née Murray, later Wass; 1 May 1955 – 7 June 2013) was a British athlete. She specialised in the 200, 400 and 4x400 relay. In the 4x400 relay she won an Olympic bronze medal at the 1980 Moscow Olympics. She also won 2 Commonwealth Gold medals in the 400 and 4x400 relay at Edmonton, Canada Commonwealth Games 1978.

== Biography ==
Murray, born in Southampton, was a south of England sprint champion and then became the British 200 metres champion after winning the British WAAA Championships title at the 1972 WAAA Championships.

Donna won the South of England 100m and 200m championships in 1974.

A year later, Murray became the British 400 metres champion at the 1975 WAAA Championships.

Shortly before the 1977 WAAA Championships Murray married fellow athlete Bill Hartley and competed under her married name thereafter. As Donna Hartley, she then won the 1977 UK Championships 400m. At the newly formed 1977 UK Athletics Championships

Donna was AAA's 200 m and 400 m champion in 1972, and 400 in 1975. And came 2nd in the 200 in 1977/78. And 400 in 1974.

Also in 1978, Donna won two Commonwealth gold medals in Edmonton, Canada, where she won the 400 metres, and the 4x400 relay.

In 1979, she was European cup semi finalist winner in both 400, and 400 relay again.

She also was runner up in European cup finals in 1975, and 1977 in 400, and 400 relay again.

Sponsored by the Midland Bank, Worked in Liverpool.

In 1980, she competed at the Moscow Olympic Games where she won a bronze medal in the 4 x 400 relay.

- Donnas Personal bests*

100m 11.46

200m 22.75

400m 51.28

After retiring from athletics Hartley married Robert Wass, better known as comedian and actor Bobby Knutt. As Donna Hartley-Wass, she competed for several years on the UK women's body building circuit, winning the National Amateur Body Building Association's Miss Britain Physique trophy in 1988, having placed third the previous year. Her bodybuilding career was short-lived and for several years after that she ran a line dancing school in Sheffield near the family home. Hartley-Wass featured on the front cover of Health & Strength magazine.

Hartley trained at a Sheffield health studio jointly owned by Bobby Knutt. Under the guidance of the health studio owner and ex-Sheffield Wednesday coach Tony Toms, Hartley achieved national success very quickly on the women's bodybuilding circuit.

She died while sunbathing in her back garden on 7 June 2013, being discovered by her husband of 26 years.

== Medals ==
- Gold medalist (400 m relay) 1978 Commonwealth Games.
- Bronze medalist (400 m relay). 1980 Olympic Games.
