= Niculina Lazarciuc =

Romanian sprinter

Personal information
- Nationality: Romanian
- Born: 6 December 1957 (age 68)

Sport
- Sport: Sprinting
- Event: 400 metres

Niculina Lazarciuc (born 6 December 1957) is a Romanian sprinter. She competed in the women's 400 metres at the 1980 Summer Olympics.
