= Rosine Wallez =

Belgian sprinter

Personal information
- Nationality: Belgian
- Born: 28 April 1957 (age 68)

Sport
- Sport: Sprinting
- Event: 400 metres

Rosine Wallez (born 28 April 1957) is a Belgian sprinter. She competed in the 400 metres at the 1976 Summer Olympics and the 1980 Summer Olympics. Wallez also shares in the 4 × 400 metres relay national record, set with Lea Alaerts, Anne Michel and Regine Berg at the 1980 Moscow Olympics.
