= Elena Tărîță =

Romanian sprinter

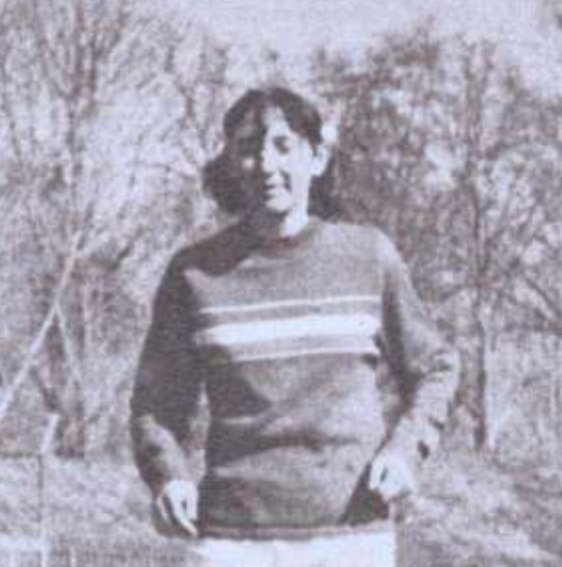
- Tărîță in 1970

Personal information
- Nationality: Romanian
- Born: 18 November 1954 (age 71)

Sport
- Sport: Sprinting
- Event: 400 metres
Medal record
Representing Romania
Summer Universiade
Bronze medal – third place	1981 Bucharest	4x400m relay

Elena Tărîță (born 18 November 1954) is a Romanian sprinter. She competed in the women's 400 metres at the 1980 Summer Olympics.
