= Gloria Ayanlaja =

Nigerian sprinter

Personal information
- Nationality: Nigerian
- Born: 12 May 1956 (age 70)

Sport
- Sport: Sprinting
- Event: 400 metres

Gloria Ayanlaja-Obajimi (born 12 May 1956) is a Nigerian former sprinter. She competed in the women's 400 metres at the 1980 Summer Olympics.
