= Tatyana Goyshchik =

Soviet sprinter

Medal record

Women's athletics

Representing Soviet Union

Olympic Games
Gold medal – first place	1980 Moscow	4×400 m

European Indoor Championships
Bronze medal – third place	1980 Sindelfingen	400 m

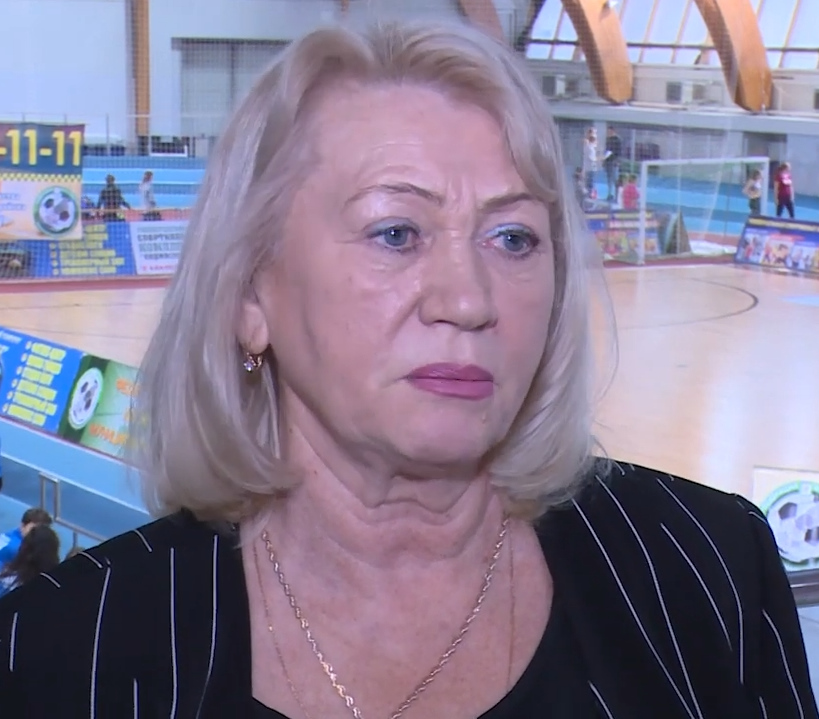
Goyshchik in 2019

Tatyana Gennadiyevna Goyshchik (Татьяна Геннадиевна Гойщик) (born July 6, 1952, in the village of Konovalov, Irkutsk Oblast) is a Soviet athlete who competed mainly in the 400 metres.

She trained at VSS Trud in Irkutsk. She competed for the USSR in the 1980 Summer Olympics held in Moscow, Russian SFSR in the 4 × 400 metres, where she won the gold medal with her teammates Tatyana Prorochenko, Nina Zyuskova and Irina Nazarova.
