= Gabriele Löwe =

East German sprinter

Personal information
- Born: Gabriele Kotte; 12 December 1958 (age 67) Dresden, East Germany
Medal record
Women's athletics
Representing East Germany
Olympic Games
Silver medal – second place	1980 Moscow	4 × 400 m

Gabriele Löwe (née Kotte; born 12 December 1958, in Dresden) is a retired East German sprinter who specialised in the 400 metres.

At the 1980 Summer Olympics in Moscow she finished sixth in the 400 metres and won a silver medal in the women's 4 × 400 metres relay with her teammates Barbara Krug, Christina Brehmer and Marita Koch.

She competed for the club SC Einheit Dresden during her active career.
