= Irina Nazarova =

Soviet sprinter (born 1957)

Personal information
- Born: July 31, 1957 (age 68) Kaliningrad, Russian SFSR, Soviet Union
Medal record
Women's Athletics
Representing the Soviet Union
Olympic Games
Gold medal – first place	1980 Moscow	4 × 400 m relay
Summer Universiade
Gold medal – first place	1981 Bucharest	4 x 400 m relay
Bronze medal – third place	1981 Bucharest	200 m

Irina Viktorovna Nazarova (Bagryantseva) (Ирина Викторовна Назарова (Багрянцева)) (born July 31, 1957, in Kaliningrad) is a Soviet athlete who competed mainly in the 400 metres. She trained in Dynamo. She is the daughter of former Olympian, Elizabeta Bagryantseva, who won silver in the discus at the Helsinki Games in 1952.

She competed for the USSR at the 1980 Summer Olympics held in Moscow, Russian SFSR, where she won the gold medal with her teammates Tatyana Prorochenko, Tatyana Goyshchik and Nina Zyuskova in the women's 4 × 400 metres event.
