= Tatyana Prorochenko =

Ukrainian athlete (1952–2020)

Personal information
- Born: March 15, 1952 Berdyansk, Ukrainian SSR, Soviet Union
- Died: March 11, 2020 (aged 67) Kyiv, Ukraine

Sport
- Sport: Track and field
Medal record
Representing Soviet Union
Olympic Games
Gold medal – first place	1980 Moscow	4×400 m
Bronze medal – third place	1976 Montreal	4×100 m
European Championships
Silver medal – second place	1978 Prague	4×400 m
Summer Universiade
Gold medal – first place	1977 Sofia	4×100 m
Gold medal – first place	1979 Mexico City	4×100 m

Tatyana Prorochenko (Татьяна Пророченко, Ukrainian: Тетяна Пророченко; March 15, 1952 – March 11, 2020) was a Ukrainian athlete from Berdyansk who competed for the Soviet Union mainly in the 400 metres.

Prorochenko initially did gymnastics before beginning athletics in 1964. She trained at VSS Kolos in Zaporizhia. She competed for the USSR in the 1976 Summer Olympics held in Montreal, Canada in the 4×100 metres where she won a bronze medal with her teammates Lyudmila Maslakova, Vera Anisimova and Nadezhda Besfamilnaya. She also placed sixth in the 200m event in 1976. She won silver at the 4×400 relay at the 1978 European Athletics Championships and was eliminated in the semifinals of the 200m event. Additionally, she won two bronze medals and one silver medal at the 1977 IAAF World Cup and 1979 IAAF World Cup respectively. She participated in the 1980 Summer Olympics held in Moscow, competing in the 4×400 metres event, winning the gold medal with her teammates Tatyana Goyshchik, Nina Zyuskova and Irina Nazarova.

After finishing her career Prorochenko worked for the Ukrainian Athletic Federation and in the National Olympic Committee of Ukraine. Prorochenko was married to another Soviet Olympic athlete, Viktor Burakov. She was diagnosed with cancer in 2018, and her family organised a public appeal for money in 2019 to pay for her treatment. She died from cancer on 11 March 2020.
