= Nina Zyuskova =

Soviet sprinter

Nina Zyuskova MS
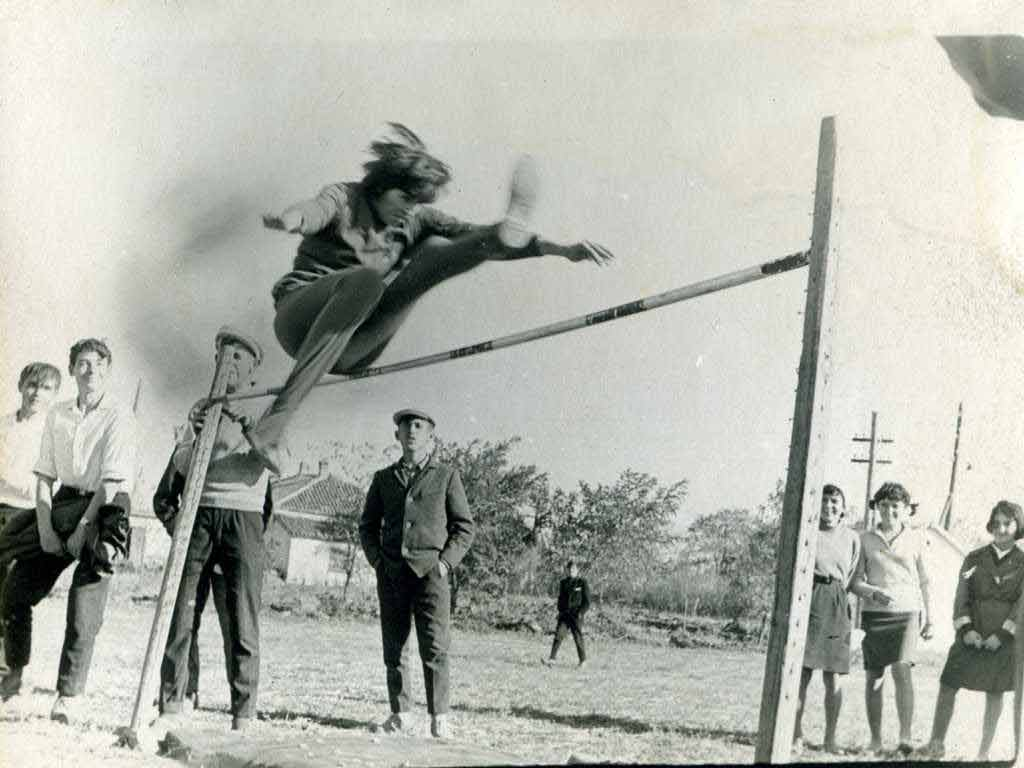

Personal information
- Native name: Нина Анатольевна Зюськова
- Nationality: Ukrainian
- Born: 3 May 1952 (age 74) Kalchyk, Donetsk, Ukrainian SSR, Soviet Union
- Height: 180 cm (5 ft 11 in)
- Weight: 67 kg (148 lb)

Sport
- Country: Soviet Union
- Sport: Athletics
- Events: 4 × 400 m relay; 400 m

Achievements and titles
- Highest world ranking: 1st (4 × 400 m relay, 1980); 5th (400 m, 1980)
- Personal bests: 400 m: 50.17 (1980); 4 × 400 m relay: 3.20.2 (1980)
Medal record
Women's Athletics
Representing the Soviet Union
Olympic Games
Gold medal – first place	1980 Moscow	4 × 400 m relay
IAAF World Cup
Silver medal – second place	1979 Montreal	4 × 400 m relay

Nina Anatolievna Zyuskova (Нина Анатольевна Зюськова, Ukrainian: Ніна Анатоліївна Зюськова; born 3 May 1952 in Kalchyk, Donetsk, Ukraine) is a Soviet athlete who competed mainly in the 400 metres.

She competed for the USSR in the 1980 Summer Olympics held in Moscow where she won the gold medal with her teammates Tatyana Prorochenko, Tatyana Goyshchik and Irina Nazarova in the women's 4 × 400 metres event. She received the Order of the Badge of Honour and is a Merited Master of Sports of the USSR.

After the Olympics, she began working as a children's coach in Donetsk.
