= 1983 European Cup "A" Final =

These are the full results of the 1983 European Cup "A" Final in athletics which was held on 20 and 21 August 1983 in London, United Kingdom.

== Team standings ==
Men
Pos.	Nation	Points
1	East Germany	117
2	Soviet Union	106
3	West Germany	102
4	Great Britain	94.5
5	Poland	86.5
6	Italy	80.5
7	France	70
8	Hungary	60.5

Women
Pos.	Nation	Points
1	East Germany	107
2	Soviet Union	85
3	Czechoslovakia	77
4	Great Britain	77
5	West Germany	58
6	Bulgaria	58
7	Poland	43
8	Hungary	34

== Men's results ==
=== 100 metres ===
20 August
Wind: -1.5 m/s

Rank	Name	Nationality	Time	Notes	Points
1	Frank Emmelmann	East Germany	10.58		8
2	Allan Wells	Great Britain	10.59		7
3	Antoine Richard	France	10.65		6
4	Viktor Bryzgin	Soviet Union	10.70		5
5	Christian Haas	West Germany	10.71		4
6	Carlo Simionato	Italy	10.74		3
7	Krzysztof Zwoliński	Poland	10.77		2
8	Ferenc Kiss	Hungary	11.08		1

=== 200 metres ===
21 August
Wind: -0.7 m/s

Rank	Lane	Name	Nationality	Time	Notes	Points
1	4	Allan Wells	Great Britain	20.72		8
2	2	Pietro Mennea	Italy	20.74		7
3	7	Erwin Skamrahl	West Germany	20.99		6
4	3	Jean-Jacques Boussemart	France	21.06		5
5	8	Marian Woronin	Poland	21.15		4
6	1	Vladimir Muravyov	Soviet Union	21.15		3
7	5	Jens Hübler	East Germany	21.19		2
8	6	István Nagy	Hungary	21.60		1

=== 400 metres ===
20 August

Rank	Name	Nationality	Time	Notes	Points
1	Hartmut Weber	West Germany	45.39		8
2	Thomas Schönlebe	East Germany	45.70		7
3	Sergey Lovachov	Soviet Union	45.83		6
4	Aldo Canti	France	45.96		5
5	Phil Brown	Great Britain	46.28		4
6	Sándor Újhelyi	Hungary	46.41		3
7	Roberto Ribaud	Italy	46.83		2
8	Jan Pawłowicz	Poland	47.62		1

=== 800 metres ===
21 August

Rank	Name	Nationality	Time	Notes	Points
1	Willi Wülbeck	West Germany	1:45.74		8
2	Detlef Wagenknecht	East Germany	1:45.83		7
3	Peter Elliott	Great Britain	1:45.84		6
4	Donato Sabia	Italy	1:47.11		5
5	Philippe Dupont	France	1:47.18		4
6	Piotr Kurek	Poland	1:47.27		3
7	Aleksandr Kostetskiy	Soviet Union	1:47.68		2
8	Imre Ötvös	Hungary	1:50.39		1

=== 1500 metres ===
20 August

Rank	Name	Nationality	Time	Notes	Points
1	Steve Cram	Great Britain	3:42.27		8
2	Andreas Busse	East Germany	3:43.12		7
3	Piotr Kurek	Poland	3:43.65		6
4	Pascal Thiébaut	France	3:43.84		5
5	Claudio Patrignani	Italy	3:43.84		4
6	Andreas Baranski	West Germany	3:44.82		3
7	Nikolay Kirov	Soviet Union	3:46.02		2
8	László Tóth	Hungary	3:47.15		1

=== 5000 metres ===
21 August

Rank	Name	Nationality	Time	Notes	Points
1	Thomas Wessinghage	West Germany	13:48.72		8
2	Dmitriy Dmitriyev	Soviet Union	13:49.27		7
3	Alberto Cova	Italy	13:55.59		6
4	Hansjörg Kunze	East Germany	13:56.62		5
5	Steve Harris	Great Britain	13:57.65		4
6	Thierry Watrice	France	13:58.76		3
7	Jerzy Kowol	Poland	14:00.01		2
8	Zoltán Kadlót	Hungary	14:03.58		1

=== 10,000 metres ===
20 August

Rank	Name	Nationality	Time	Notes	Points
1	Werner Schildhauer	East Germany	28:02.11		8
2	Alberto Cova	Italy	28:02.13		7
3	Valeriy Abramov	Soviet Union	28:02.87		6
4	Christoph Herle	West Germany	28:04.13		5
5	Steve Jones	Great Britain	28:07.03		4
6	Philippe Legrand	France	29:17.87		3
7	Bogumił Kuś	Poland	29:20.87		2
8	József Májer	Hungary	29:21.36		1

=== 110 metres hurdles ===
21 August
Wind: -1.6 m/s

Rank	Name	Nationality	Time	Notes	Points
1	Thomas Munkelt	East Germany	13.72		8
2	György Bakos	Hungary	13.74		7
3	Romuald Giegiel	Poland	13.88		6
4	Daniele Fontecchio	Italy	13.91		5
5	Andrey Prokofyev	Soviet Union	14.14		4
6	Michael Radzey	West Germany	14.31		3
7	Philippe Hatil	France	14.36		2
8	Mark Holtom	Great Britain	15.12		1

=== 400 metres hurdles ===
20 August

Rank	Name	Nationality	Time	Notes	Points
1	Harald Schmid	West Germany	48.56		8
2	Aleksandr Kharlov	Soviet Union	49.53		7
3	Ryszard Szparak	Poland	49.65		6
4	Steve Sole	Great Britain	50.58		5
5	Luca Cosi	Italy	50.72		4
6	István Takács	Hungary	50.78		3
7	Rolf Herrmann	East Germany	51.24		2
8	Dominique Duvigneau	France	52.07		1

=== 3000 metres steeplechase ===
21 August

Rank	Name	Nationality	Time	Notes	Points
1	Bogusław Mamiński	Poland	8:24.80		8
2	Colin Reitz	Great Britain	8:25.72		7
3	Joseph Mahmoud	France	8:28.04		6
4	Hagen Melzer	East Germany	8:28.87		5
5	Gábor Markó	Hungary	8:29.11		4
6	Boris Pruss	Soviet Union	8:38.83		3
7	Mariano Scartezzini	Italy	8:50.50		2
	Patriz Ilg	West Germany	DNF		0

=== 4 × 100 metres relay ===
20 August

Rank	Lane	Nation	Athletes	Time	Note	Points
1	7	Italy	Stefano Tilli, Carlo Simionato, Giovanni Bongiorni, Pietro Mennea	38.86		8
2	1	Great Britain	Lincoln Asquith, Donovan Reid, Mike McFarlane, Cameron Sharp	38.88		7
3	5	Poland	Krzysztof Zwoliński, Zenon Licznerski, Czesław Prądzyński, Marian Woronin	38.97		6
4	2	East Germany	Andreas Knebel, Thomas Schröder, Jens Hübler, Frank Emmelmann	38.99		5
5	8	France	Thierry François, Marc Gasparoni, Antoine Richard, Jean-Jacques Boussemart	39.19		4
6	6	Soviet Union	Andrey Prokofyev, Nikolay Sidorov, Vladimir Muravyov, Viktor Bryzgin	39.40		3
7	3	Hungary	István Nagy, Ferenc Kiss, István Tatár, Attila Kovács	39.45		2
8	4	West Germany	Jürgen Kofler, Erwin Skamrahl, Werner Bastians, Richard Luxemburger	39.59		1

=== 4 × 400 metres relay ===
21 August

Rank	Lane	Nation	Athletes	Time	Note	Points
1	2	Great Britain	Kriss Akabusi, Garry Cook, Todd Bennett, Phil Brown	3:02.28		8
2	3	East Germany	Udo Bauer, Jens Carlowitz, Andreas Knebel, Thomas Schönlebe	3:02.62		7
3	7	Soviet Union	Sergey Lovachov, Viktor Markin, Yevgeniy Lomtyev, Aleksandr Troshchilo	3:02.77		6
4	5	West Germany	Edgar Nakladal, Jörg Vaihinger, Thomas Giessing, Hartmut Weber	3:02.78		5
5	8	Italy	Stefano Malinverni, Donato Sabia, Mauro Zuliani, Roberto Ribaud	3:03.25		4
6	4	Hungary	Miklós Nagy, Sándor Újhelyi, István Takács, Sándor Vasvári	3:05.90		3
7	6	Poland	Tadeusz Rogiński, Ryszard Szparak, Czesław Prądzyński, Jan Pawłowicz	3:07.41		2
8	1	France	Jacques Fellice, Hector Llatser, Jean-Jacques Fevrier, Aldo Canti	3:10.58		1

=== High jump ===
20 August

Rank	Name	Nationality	2.00	2.10	2.15	2.19	2.23	2.26	2.29	2.32	2.34	2.38	Result	Notes	Points
1	Franck Verzy	France	–	o	o	o	o	o	o	o	–	xxx	2.32	NR	8
2	Valeriy Sereda	Soviet Union	–	o	–	o	o	o	–	–	xxx		2.26		7
3	Dietmar Mögenburg	West Germany	–	o	–	o	o	xxx					2.23		6
4	Andreas Sam	East Germany	o	o	o	o	xo	xxx					2.23		5
5	Massimo Di Giorgio	Italy	o	o	o	o	xxx						2.19		3.5
5	Jacek Wszoła	Poland	–	o	o	o	xxx						2.19		3.5
7	Geoff Parsons	Great Britain	–	o	–	xo	–	xxx					2.19		1.5
7	István Gibicsár	Hungary	o	o	o	xo	xxx						2.19		1.5

=== Pole vault ===
21 August

Rank	Name	Nationality	4.80	5.00	5.10	5.20	5.30	5.40	5.45	5.50	5.55	5.60	5.72	Result	Notes	Points
1	Patrick Abada	France	–	–	–	–	–	o	–	–	o	–	xxx	5.55		8
2	Aleksandr Krupskiy	Soviet Union	–	–	–	o	–	o	–	o	–	xxx		5.50		7
3	Jürgen Winkler	West Germany	–	o	–	xo	–	o	–	xxo	–	xxx		5.50		6
4	Ferenc Salbert	Hungary	–	–	o	–	o	–	xxx					5.30		5
5	Tadeusz Ślusarski	Poland	–	–	–	xxo	–	xxx						5.20		4
6	Olaf Kasten	East Germany	o	o	o	xxx								5.10		3
7	Keith Stock	Great Britain	–	–	xo	–	xxx							5.10		2
8	Mauro Barella	Italy	xo	o	xxx									5.00		1

=== Long jump ===
20 August

Rank	Name	Nationality	#1	#2	#3	#4	#5	#6	Result	Notes	Points
1	László Szálma	Hungary	7.80	8.01w	x	x	x	8.10w	8.10w		8
2	Oganes Stepanyan	Soviet Union	8.06w	x	8.09	7.96	x	7.90	8.09		7
3	Matthias Koch	East Germany	7.63	7.81w	7.88w	x	x	7.84w	7.88w		6
4	Włodzimierz Włodarczyk	Poland	7.68	7.54	x	7.77	7.78	x	7.78		5
5	Giovanni Evangelisti	Italy	7.75	7.67	x	7.51w	x	7.78	7.78		4
6	John Herbert	Great Britain	7.66	6.53	7.37	x	x	x	7.66		3
7	Joachim Busse	West Germany	7.48	7.59	x	x	x	7.53	7.59		2
8	Philippe Deroche	France	7.40	7.33	7.27w	7.32	7.21	x	7.40		1

=== Triple jump ===
21 August

Rank	Name	Nationality	#1	#2	#3	#4	#5	#6	Result	Notes	Points
1	Peter Bouschen	West Germany	16.10w	16.17	x	16.81	16.65	17.12	17.12		8
2	Zdzisław Hoffmann	Poland	16.73	16.78	16.94	16.75	–	16.93	16.94		7
3	Béla Bakosi	Hungary	x	16.51	x	16.04	16.62	16.86	16.86		6
4	Keith Connor	Great Britain	x	16.62w	16.47w	x	16.50	16.32	16.62w		5
5	Vasiliy Grishchenkov	Soviet Union	16.05	x	16.50	–	–	x	16.50		4
6	Axel Gross	East Germany	16.12	16.39	x	16.40	x	x	16.40		3
7	Dario Badinelli	Italy	15.78	15.99	15.59	15.81	x	15.77	15.99		2
8	Henri Dorina	France	15.62	x	15.93	15.72	x	x	15.93		1

=== Shot put ===
20 August

Rank	Name	Nationality	#1	#2	#3	#4	#5	#6	Result	Notes	Points
1	Edward Sarul	Poland	20.54	x	20.34	x	x	20.16	20.54		8
2	Ulf Timmermann	East Germany	x	19.57	19.46	20.32	20.39	x	20.39		7
3	Jānis Bojārs	Soviet Union	x	19.50	20.13	19.97	20.16	x	20.16		6
4	Alessandro Andrei	Italy	18.33	18.69	18.92	19.22	19.12	18.72	19.22		5
5	László Szabó	Hungary	17.81	18.62	18.54	18.61	18.55	18.52	18.62		4
6	Udo Gelhausen	West Germany	17.51	x	17.32	x	–	–	17.51		3
7	Mike Winch	Great Britain	16.83	17.05	x	17.23	x	17.10	17.23		2
8	Jean-Marie Djébaili	France	16.50	16.48	x	x	x	x	16.50		1

=== Discus throw ===
21 August

Rank	Name	Nationality	#1	#2	#3	#4	#5	#6	Result	Notes	Points
1	Jürgen Schult	East Germany	64.40	63.96	63.22	x	64.96	64.62	64.96		8
2	Alwin Wagner	West Germany	60.34	x	55.74	60.12	x	64.14	64.14		7
3	Georgiy Kolnootchenko	Soviet Union	x	63.30	63.20	x	64.04	60.84	64.04		6
	Dariusz Juzyszyn	Poland	~~59.90~~	~~59.54~~	~~60.26~~	~~59.18~~	~~62.40~~	~~x~~	~~62.40~~	DQ – doping	0
4	Robert Weir	Great Britain	60.14	x	58.48	58.28	x	x	60.14		5
5	Marco Bucci	Italy	55.16	56.86	x	58.52	57.90	x	58.52		4
6	Ferenc Tégla	Hungary	53.56	56.46	58.10	57.52	56.98	57.34	58.10		3
7	Namakoro Niaré	France	55.78	x	x	55.82	56.52	x	56.52		2

=== Hammer throw ===
21 August

Rank	Name	Nationality	#1	#2	#3	#4	#5	#6	Result	Notes	Points
1	Sergey Litvinov	Soviet Union	79.04	79.82	81.52	78.34	x	–	81.52		8
2	Zdzisław Kwaśny	Poland	72.86	78.58	80.18	x	x	79.42	80.18		7
3	Günther Rodehau	East Germany	77.58	75.88	x	76.22	76.58	77.42	77.58		6
4	Karl-Hans Riehm	West Germany	x	76.56	76.06	77.00	76.78	75.80	77.00		5
5	József Vida	Hungary	x	x	72.66	73.88	x	72.12	73.88		4
6	Giampaolo Urlando	Italy	70.38	70.92	72.74	x	71.92	x	72.74		3
7	Chris Black	Great Britain	70.58	70.90	x	71.52	x	71.98	71.98		2
8	Walter Ciofani	France	64.60	63.12	x	65.40	x	64.56	65.40		q

=== Javelin throw ===
20 August – Old model

Rank	Name	Nationality	#1	#2	#3	#4	#5	#6	Result	Notes	Points
1	Detlef Michel	East Germany	85.72	83.48	x	83.88	80.46	x	85.72		8
2	Heino Puuste	Soviet Union	85.54	81.26	79.82	x	x	84.62	85.54		7
3	Klaus Tafelmeier	West Germany	84.20	82.44	80.76	x	82.14	73.46	84.20		6
4	David Ottley	Great Britain	81.24	x	81.42	x	82.40	x	82.40		5
5	Stanisław Górak	Poland	76.18	81.68	x	x	x	x	81.68		4
6	Jean-Paul Lakafia	France	x	62.98	79.80	x	–	x	79.80		3
7	Agostino Ghesini	Italy	x	x	72.40	71.54	76.14	78.88	78.88		2
8	András Temesi	Hungary	x	77.88	75.66	x	x	x	77.88		1

== Women's results ==
=== 100 metres ===
20 August
Wind: -1.0 m/s

Rank	Name	Nationality	Time	Notes	Points
1	Marlies Göhr	East Germany	11.28		8
2	Anelia Nuneva	Bulgaria	11.33		7
3	Kathy Cook	Great Britain	11.39		6
4	Taťána Kocembová	Czechoslovakia	11.47		5
5	Olga Antonova	Soviet Union	11.49		4
6	Ewa Kasprzyk	Poland	11.62		3
7	Michaela Schabinger	West Germany	11.79		2
8	Erzsébet Juhász	Hungary	12.31		1

=== 200 metres ===
21 August
Wind: -1.7 m/s

Rank	Lane	Name	Nationality	Time	Notes	Points
1	7	Jarmila Kratochvílová	Czechoslovakia	22.40		8
2	6	Marita Koch	East Germany	22.40		7
3	2	Kathy Cook	Great Britain	22.57		6
4	1	Anelia Nuneva	Bulgaria	22.96		5
5	4	Irina Baskakova	Soviet Union	23.40		4
6	5	Judit Forgács	Hungary	23.78		3
7	3	Michaela Schabinger	West Germany	23.97		2
8	8	Ewa Kasprzyk	Poland	23.98		1

=== 400 metres ===
20 August

Rank	Name	Nationality	Time	Notes	Points
1	Taťána Kocembová	Czechoslovakia	49.33		8
2	Mariya Pinigina	Soviet Union	50.65		7
3	Gaby Bußmann	West Germany	51.09		6
4	Sabine Busch	East Germany	51.56		5
5	Michelle Scutt	Great Britain	52.02		4
6	Judit Forgács	Hungary	52.18		3
7	Rositsa Stamenova	Bulgaria	52.52		2
8	Elżbieta Kapusta	Poland	53.41		1

=== 800 metres ===
20 August

Rank	Name	Nationality	Time	Notes	Points
1	Jarmila Kratochvílová	Czechoslovakia	1:58.79		8
2	Antje Schröder	East Germany	1:59.53		7
3	Margrit Klinger	West Germany	1:59.64		6
4	Jolanta Januchta	Poland	2:00.70		5
5	Tamara Sorokina	Soviet Union	2:02.70		4
6	Totka Petrova	Bulgaria	2:03.35		3
7	Anne Purvis	Great Britain	2:03.66		2
8	Éva Mohácsi	Hungary	2:08.90		1

=== 1500 metres ===
21 August

Rank	Name	Nationality	Time	Notes	Points
1	Nadezhda Ralldugina	Soviet Union	4:07.61		8
2	Christiane Wartenberg	East Germany	4:07.86		7
3	Totka Petrova	Bulgaria	4:08.02		6
4	Wendy Sly	Great Britain	4:08.70		5
5	Katalin Szalai	Hungary	4:12.17		4
6	Jana Červenková	Czechoslovakia	4:14.51		3
7	Renata Kokowska	Poland	4:19.41		2
8	Martina van Dam	West Germany	4:22.95		1

=== 3000 metres ===
21 August

Rank	Name	Nationality	Time	Notes	Points
1	Tatyana Kazankina	Soviet Union	8:49.27		8
2	Ulrike Bruns	East Germany	8:49.71		7
3	Jane Furniss	Great Britain	8:51.58		6
4	Ivana Kleinová	Czechoslovakia	9:11.66		5
5	Vera Michallek	West Germany	9:16.10		4
6	Wanda Panfil	Poland	9:18.31		3
7	Ilona Jankó	Hungary	9:23.19		2
8	Rossitza Ekova	Bulgaria	9:53.41		q

=== 100 metres hurdles ===
21 August
Wind: -2.1 m/s

Rank	Name	Nationality	Time	Notes	Points
1	Bettine Jahn	East Germany	12.89		8
2	Lucyna Kałek	Poland	12.97		7
3	Ginka Zagorcheva	Bulgaria	13.10		6
4	Yelena Biserova	Soviet Union	13.26		5
5	Shirley Strong	Great Britain	13.37		4
6	Ulrike Denk	West Germany	13.60		3
7	Xénia Siska	Hungary	13.85		2
8	Hana Chocová	Czechoslovakia	14.19		1

=== 400 metres hurdles ===
21 August

Rank	Name	Nationality	Time	Notes	Points
1	Ellen Fiedler	East Germany	54.20		8
2	Anna Ambraziene	Soviet Union	54.74		7
3	Susan Morley	Great Britain	56.36		6
4	Anna Filičková	Czechoslovakia	56.84		5
5	Sabine Everts	West Germany	57.05		4
6	Nadezhda Asenova	Soviet Union	57.84		3
7	Erika Szopori	Hungary	58.27		2
8	Anna Maniecka	Poland	58.83		1

=== 4 × 100 metres relay ===
20 August

Rank	Nation	Athletes	Time	Note	Points
1	East Germany	Silke Gladisch, Marita Koch, Ingrid Auerswald, Marlies Göhr	42.63		8
2	Great Britain	Joan Baptiste, Kathy Cook, Bev Callender, Shirley Thomas	43.18		7
3	Soviet Union	Lyudmila Kondratyeva, Yelena Vinogradova, Irina Olkhovnikova, Olga Antonova	43.67		6
4	Bulgaria	Ginka Zagorcheva, Anelia Nuneva, Nadezhda Georgieva, Atanaska Georgieva	43.88		5
5	Czechoslovakia	Taťána Kocembová, Štěpánka Sokolová, Radislava Šoborová, Eva Murková	44.20		4
6	West Germany	Monika Hirsch, Elke Vollmer, Michaela Schabinger, Ute Thimm	44.26		3
7	Poland	Lucyna Kałek, Ewa Kasprzyk, Anna Ślipiko, Iwona Pakuła	44.38		2
8	Hungary	Xénia Siska, Erzsébet Juhász, Ibolya Petrika, Judit Forgács	45.90		1

=== 4 × 400 metres relay ===
21 August

Rank	Nation	Athletes	Time	Note	Points
1	Czechoslovakia	Zuzana Moravčíková, Milena Matejkovicová, Taťána Kocembová, Jarmila Kratochvílová	3:20.80		8
2	Soviet Union	Yelena Korban, Marina Ivanova, Irina Baskakova, Maria Pinigina	3:21.71		7
3	East Germany	Gesine Walther, Sabine Busch, Undine Bremer, Dagmar Rubsam	3:22.70		6
4	West Germany	Rita Daimer, Ute Thimm, Gisela Gotwald, Gaby Bußmann	3:27.13		5
5	Great Britain	Michelle Scutt, Angela Bridgeman, Joslyn Hoyte-Smith, Kathy Cook	3:27.29		4
6	Bulgaria	Svobodka Damianova, Rositsa Stamenova, Galina Penkova, Katya Ilieva	3:27.61		3
7	Poland	Ewa Piasek, Małgorzata Dunecka, Jolanta Januchta, Elżbieta Kapusta	3:32.60		2
8	Hungary	Ilona Pál, Erzsébet Szabó, Ibolya Petrika, Judit Forgács	3:34.35		1

=== High jump ===
21 August

Rank	Name	Nationality	1.65	1.70	1.75	1.80	1.84	1.87	1.90	1.93	1.95	1.97	1.99	2.01	2.03	2.05	Result	Notes	Points
1	Ulrike Meyfarth	West Germany	–	–	–	o	o		xo	o	o	xo	xo	xxo	o	xxx	2.03	WR	8
2	Tamara Bykova	Soviet Union	–	–	–	o	o	o	o	o	o	o	o	o	xo	xxx	2.03	=WR	7
3	Kerstin Brandt	East Germany	–	–	–	o	o	o	o	o	o	xo	xxo	xxx			1.99		6
4	Olga Juha	Hungary	–	–	o	o	o	o	o	o	xo	xxo	x				1.97	NR	5
5	Gillian Evans	Great Britain	–	–	–	o	o	o	o	xxx							1.90		4
6	Danuta Bułkowska	Poland	–	–	o	o	o	xo	xxx								1.87		3
7	Svetlana Isaeva	Bulgaria	o	o	o	o	xo	xxx									1.84		2
8	Zdenka Boukalová	Czechoslovakia	o	o	o	o	xxx										1.80		1

=== Long jump ===
21 August

Rank	Name	Nationality	#1	#2	#3	#4	#5	#6	Result	Notes	Points
1	Heike Daute	East Germany	6.79	6.99w	6.80w	6.66	6.99	6.68	6.99w		8
2	Eva Murková	Czechoslovakia	6.81w	6.68	6.53	6.73w	6.57	x	6.81w		7
3	Bev Kinch	Great Britain	6.43w	x	x	6.59	6.36	6.63	6.63		6
4	Zsuzsa Vanyek	Hungary	6.28w	6.63w	6.45	6.26	6.16w	6.42w	6.63		5
5	Sabine Everts	Hungary	6.19	6.30	x	x	x	x	6.30		4
6	Urszula Majkut	Poland	6.26w	6.07	6.23	6.11	6.20	6.09w	6.26		3
7	Tsetska Kancheva	Bulgaria	5.81w	6.03	5.73w	6.03w	6.07w	6.10w	6.10		2
8	Yolanda Chen	Soviet Union	x	6.07	6.08w	x	x	6.06	6.08		1

=== Shot put ===
21 August

Rank	Name	Nationality	#1	#2	#3	#4	#5	#6	Result	Notes	Points
1	Helena Fibingerová	Czechoslovakia	19.49	x	20.76	19.59	19.70	x	20.76		8
2	Helma Knorscheidt	East Germany	19.30	19.49	19.14	19.15	x	x	19.49		7
3	Nunu Abashidze	Soviet Union	x	18.20	18.86	18.88	18.84	x	18.88		6
4	Venissa Head	Great Britain	17.37	x	18.12	17.78	17.55	x	18.12		5
5	Svetla Mitkova	Bulgaria	16.89	18.16	16.94	x	17.40	17.37	17.40		4
6	Mechthild Schönleber	West Germany	15.03	17.28	x	16.75	16.51	x	17.28		3
7	Viktória Horváth	Hungary	16.35	16.35	16.11	16.14	16.23	x	16.35		2
8	Bogumiła Suska	Poland	15.43	15.58	x	x	15.01	15.21	15.58		1

=== Discus throw ===
20 August

Rank	Name	Nationality	#1	#2	#3	#4	#5	#6	Result	Notes	Points
1	Martina Opitz	East Germany	63.24	65.92	63.52	67.72	67.08	69.00	69.00		8
2	Galina Murashova	Soviet Union	65.46	67.80	68.86	x	67.70	68.74	68.86		7
3	Mariya Petkova	Bulgaria	62.86	64.88	63.92	63.92	x	62.84	64.88		6
4	Zdeňka Šilhavá	Czechoslovakia	x	63.16	x	62.68	x	64.36	64.36		5
5	Meg Ritchie	Great Britain	57.00	x	60.22	57.38	x	59.68	60.22		4
	Ágnes Herczegh	Hungary	~~58.10~~	~~56.42~~	~~x~~	~~x~~	~~59.22~~	~~59.64~~	~~59.64~~	DQ, doping	0
6	Danuta Majewska	Poland	56.60	53.08	x	57.14	55.60	58.36	58.36		3
7	Dagmar Galler	West Germany	x	54.32	53.54	54.02	50.62	55.20	55.20		2

=== Javelin throw ===
20 August – Old model

Rank	Name	Nationality	#1	#2	#3	#4	#5	#6	Result	Notes	Points
1	Fatima Whitbread	Great Britain	64.56	69.04	x	66.54	x	x	69.04		8
2	Antje Kempe	East Germany	x	62.06	61.10	x	x	63.22	63.22		7
3	Genowefa Olejarz	Poland	54.38	63.12	x	50.14	x	57.10	63.12		6
4	Beate Peters	West Germany	59.70	60.40	x	59.60	59.26	x	60.40		5
5	Saida Gunba	Soviet Union	58.12	59.84	x	x	55.32	49.48	59.84		4
6	Antoaneta Todorova	Bulgaria	x	58.62	x	48.34	53.86	58.00	58.62		3
7	Mária Janák	Hungary	x	x	56.16	53.80	x	x	56.16		2
8	Elena Burgárová	Czechoslovakia	x	54.26	x	x	55.18	54.92	55.18		1
