= 1982 European Athletics Championships – Men's 400 metres =

Men's 400 metres at the European Athletics Championships

These are the official results of the Men's 400 metres event at the 1982 European Championships in Athens, Greece, held at Olympic Stadium "Spiros Louis" on 7, 8, and 9 September 1982.

== Medalists ==
Gold	Hartmut Weber; West Germany
Silver	Andreas Knebel; East Germany
Bronze	Viktor Markin; Soviet Union

== Results ==
=== Final ===
9 September

Rank	Name	Nationality	Time	Notes
1st place, gold medalist(s)	Hartmut Weber	West Germany	44.72	CR
2nd place, silver medalist(s)	Andreas Knebel	East Germany	45.29	
3rd place, bronze medalist(s)	Viktor Markin	Soviet Union	45.30	
4	Phil Brown	United Kingdom	45.45	
5	Aleksandr Troshchilo	Soviet Union	45.67	
6	Pavel Konovalov	Soviet Union	45.84	
7	Željko Knapić	Yugoslavia	46.20	
8	Thomas Giessing	West Germany	48.70	

=== Semi-finals ===
8 September

==== Semi-final 1 ====
Rank	Name	Nationality	Time	Notes
1	Hartmut Weber	West Germany	46.13	Q
2	Andreas Knebel	East Germany	46.30	Q
3	Pavel Konovalov	Soviet Union	46.32	Q
4	Aleksandr Troshchilo	Soviet Union	46.40	Q
5	Mauro Zuliani	Italy	46.44	
6	Todd Bennett	United Kingdom	46.84	
7	Andrzej Stępień	Poland	47.28	
8	Oddur Sigurðsson	Iceland	47.35	

==== Semi-final 2 ====
Rank	Name	Nationality	Time	Notes
1	Viktor Markin	Soviet Union	45.99	Q
2	Phil Brown	United Kingdom	46.14	Q
3	Željko Knapić	Yugoslavia	46.24	Q
4	Thomas Giessing	West Germany	46.43	Q
5	Didier Dubois	France	46.56	
6	Roberto Ribaud	Italy	46.58	
7	Sándor Újhelyi	Hungary	46.59	
8	David Jenkins	United Kingdom	47.04	

=== Heats ===
7 September

==== Heat 1 ====
Rank	Name	Nationality	Time	Notes
1	Hartmut Weber	West Germany	45.90	Q
2	David Jenkins	United Kingdom	46.13	Q
3	Pavel Konovalov	Soviet Union	46.23	Q
4	Sándor Újhelyi	Hungary	46.46	q
5	Didier Dubois	France	46.51	q
6	Benjamín González	Spain	47.00	
7	Hannu Mykrä	Finland	47.16	

==== Heat 2 ====
Rank	Name	Nationality	Time	Notes
1	Phil Brown	United Kingdom	46.52	Q
2	Viktor Markin	Soviet Union	46.53	Q
3	Roberto Ribaud	Italy	46.57	Q
4	Oddur Sigurðsson	Iceland	46.63	q
5	Andrzej Stępień	Poland	46.65	q
6	Hector Llatser	France	47.46	
7	José Carvalho	Portugal	47.92	

==== Heat 3 ====
Rank	Name	Nationality	Time	Notes
1	Željko Knapić	Yugoslavia	46.71	Q
2	Mauro Zuliani	Italy	46.72	Q
3	Aleksandr Troshchilo	Soviet Union	46.74	Q
4	Ryszard Podlas	Poland	46.88	
5	Eric Josjö	Sweden	46.91	
6	Edgar Nakladal	West Germany	47.30	
7	Paul Bourdin	France	47.43	

==== Heat 4 ====
Rank	Name	Nationality	Time	Notes
1	Todd Bennett	United Kingdom	46.16	Q
2	Andreas Knebel	East Germany	46.32	Q
3	Thomas Giessing	West Germany	46.41	Q
4	Roberto Tozzi	Italy	46.65	
5	Jacques Borlée	Belgium	47.52	

== Participation ==
According to an unofficial count, 26 athletes from 15 countries participated in the event.

- Belgium (1)
- East Germany (1)
- Finland (1)
- France (3)
- Hungary (1)
- Iceland (1)
- Italy (3)
- Poland (2)
- Portugal (1)
- Soviet Union (3)
- Spain (1)
- Sweden (1)
- United Kingdom (3)
- West Germany (3)
- Yugoslavia (1)

== See also ==
- 1978 Men's European Championships 400 metres (Prague)
- 1980 Men's Olympic 400 metres (Moscow)
- 1983 Men's World Championships 400 metres (Helsinki)
- 1984 Men's Olympic 400 metres (Los Angeles)
- 1986 Men's European Championships 400 metres (Stuttgart)
- 1987 Men's World Championships 400 metres (Rome)
- 1988 Men's Olympic 400 metres (Seoul)
