= 1979 European Athletics Junior Championships =

- Level: Under 20
- Events: 36

The 1979 European Athletics Junior Championships was the fifth edition of the biennial athletics competition for European athletes aged under twenty. It was held in Bydgoszcz, Poland between 16 and 19 August.

== Men's results ==
Event	Gold		Silver		Bronze	
100 metres	Thomas Schröder (GDR)	10.41	Werner Zaske (FRG)	10.43	Mike McFarlane (GBR)	10.43
200 metres	Mike McFarlane (GBR)	20.89	Thomas Schröder (GDR)	21.11	Francesco Tiziani (ITA)	21.17
400 metres	Hartmut Weber (FRG)	45.77	Andreas Knebel (GDR)	46.45	Melvin Fowell (GBR)	46.63
800 metres	Klaus-Peter Nabein (FRG)	1:48.18	Andreas Hauck (GDR)	1:48.85	Dieter Elmer (SUI)	1:48.98
1500 metres	Graham Williamson (GBR)	3:38.96	Leonid Bruk (URS)	3:39.95	Peter Wirz (SUI)	3:42.66
3000 metres	Steve Cram (GBR)	8:05.18	Jürgen Mattern (GDR)	8:05.48	Aleksandr Kuznetsov (URS)	8:07.77
5000 metres	Steve Binns (GBR)	13:44.37	Eddy De Pauw (BEL)	13:52.19	António Leitão (POR)	13:54.83
110 m hurdles	Frank Rossland (GDR)	14.09	György Bakos (HUN)	14.23	Georgiy Shabanov (URS)	14.24
400 m hurdles	Yeoryiós Vamvakas (GRE)	50.67	Sergey Chizhikov (URS)	51.31	Serge Guillen (FRA)	51.44
2000 m s'chase	Gaetano Erba (ITA)	5:27.44	Colin Reitz (GBR)	5:29.61	Michael Längler (FRG)	5:32.48
10 000 metres walk	Jozef Pribilinec (TCH)	41:04.71	Erling Andersen (NOR)	41:12.80	Jörg Pasemann (GDR)	42:31.04
4 × 100 m relay	West Germany (FRG); Hans Fritzsche; Dieter Daniels; Herbert Mutschler; Werner Zaske	39.86	Great Britain (GBR); Philip Cooke; Michael Powell; Phil Brown; Mike McFarlane	40.06	Italy (ITA); Alessandro Angelini; Francesco Tiziani; Ermanno Colombo; Carlo Simionato	40.21
4 × 400 m relay	West Germany (FRG); Thomas Giessing; Edgar Nakladal; Uwe Schmitt; Hartmut Weber	3:06.73	Soviet Union (URS); Valeriy Lagutyenok; Sergey Melnikov; Fedor Vakhitov; Pavel Konovalov	3:06.76	East Germany (GDR); Frank Hübner; Enrico Becker; Andreas Neuber; Andreas Knebel	3:07.35
High jump	Dietmar Mögenburg (FRG)	2.24 m	Roberto Cerri (ITA)	2.24 m	Harald Ehlke (FRG)	2.18 m
Pole vault	Vladimir Polyakov (URS)	5.40 m	Aleksandr Krupskiy (URS)	5.40 m	Thierry Vigneron (FRA)	5.40 m
Long jump	Andrzej Klimaszewski (POL)	7.83 m	Michael Rentz (GDR)	7.72 m	Waldemar Golanko (POL)	7.58 m
Triple jump	Aleksandr Beskrovnyi (URS)	16.47 m	Viktor Gerassimenya (URS)	16.45 m	Mihai Ene (ROM)	16.15 m
Shot put	Remigius Machura (TCH)	18.34 m	Andreas Horn (GDR)	18.30 m	Sergey Kasnauskas (URS)	18.03 m
Discus throw	Jürgen Schult (GDR)	56.18 m	Sergey Kot (URS)	55.44 m	Ryszard Idziak (POL)	54.94 m
Hammer throw	Igor Nikulin (URS)	71.56 m	Yuriy Pastukhov (URS)	67.18 m	Klaus Streckenbach (GDR)	66.24 m
Javelin throw	Joachim Lange (GDR)	78.78 m	Yuriy Zhirov (URS)	76.92 m	Mitko Pavlov (BUL)	72.66 m
Decathlon	Siegfried Wentz (FRG)	7822 pts	Dietmar Jentsch (GDR)	7718 pts	Peter Hummel (GDR)	7506 pts

== Women's results ==
Event	Gold		Silver		Bronze	
100 metres	Kerstin Walther (GDR)	11.57	Kirsten Siemon (GDR)	11.57	Elke Vollmer (FRG)	11.61
200 metres	Kerstin Walther (GDR)	23.11	Karin Verguts (BEL)	23.41	Natalya Bochina (URS) Elke Vollmer (FRG)	23.45
400 metres	Dagmar Rübsam (GDR)	51.55	Liliya Tuznikova (URS)	51.68	Marion Heilmann (GDR)	52.08
800 metres	Marion Hübner (GDR)	2:01.21	Birgit Brudel (GDR)	2:01.90	Rossitsa Ekova (BUL)	2:02.72
1500 metres	Irina Nikitina (URS)	4:10.50	Gunvor Hilde (NOR)	4:11.84	Cristieana Cojocaru (ROM)	4:12.14
100 m hurdles	Lena Spoof (FIN)	13.24	Silva Oja (URS)	13.57	Edith Oker (FRG)	13.70
4 × 100 m relay	East Germany (GDR); Cornelia Kirsten; Kerstin Walther; Undine Hartmann; Kirsten Siemon	43.95	Soviet Union (URS); Yelena Malakhova; Galina Mikheyeva; Alla Kozlovskaya; Natalya Bochina	44.59	West Germany (FRG); Edith Oker; Elke Vollmer; Anke Köninger; Friedericke Vombohr	44.84
4 × 400 m relay	East Germany (GDR); Kerstin Cattus; Marion Hübner; Marion Heilmann; Dagmar Rübsam	3:31.68	West Germany (FRG); Petra Krützmann; Anke Zelgert; Friedericke Vombohr; Rita Daimer	3:35.39	Soviet Union (URS); Lyubov Kiryukhina; Aldona Mendzoryte; Marina Ivanova; Liliya Tuznikova	3:35.47
High jump	Kerstin Dedner (GDR)	1.87 m	Katrin Buck (FRG)	1.87 m	Barbara Simmonds (GBR)	1.84 m
Long jump	Helga Radtke (GDR)	6.47 m	Sabine Everts (FRG)	6.46 m	Sue Hearnshaw (GBR)	6.46 m
Shot put	Liane Schmuhl (GDR)	18.33 m	Simone Rudrich (GDR)	17.12 m	Yelena Kozlova (URS)	16.59 m
Discus throw	Irina Meszynski (GDR)	60.30 m	Silvia Madetzky (GDR)	56.88 m	Tsvetanka Khristova (BUL)	54.76 m
Javelin throw	Fatima Whitbread (GBR)	58.20 m	Katrin Strobel (GDR)	58.02 m	Antoaneta Todorova (BUL)	57.76 m
Pentathlon	Sabine Everts (FRG)	4594 pts	Silva Oja (URS)	4424 pts	Anke Vater (GDR)	4322 pts

== Medal table ==
Rank	Nation	Gold	Silver	Bronze	Total
1	East Germany (GDR)	14	11	7	32
2	West Germany (FRG)	7	4	5	16
3	Great Britain (GBR)	5	2	4	11
4	Soviet Union (URS)	4	12	6	22
5	Czechoslovakia (TCH)	2	0	0	2
6	Italy (ITA)	1	1	2	4
7	Poland (POL)	1	0	2	3
8	Finland (FIN)	1	0	0	1
8	Greece (GRE)	1	0	0	1
10	Belgium (BEL)	0	2	0	2
10	Norway (NOR)	0	2	0	2
12	Hungary (HUN)	0	1	0	1
13	Bulgaria (BUL)	0	0	4	4
14	Romania (ROU)	0	0	2	2
14	Switzerland (SUI)	0	0	2	2
16	Portugal (POR)	0	0	1	1
Totals (16 entries)		36	35	35	106
