= 1983 World Championships in Athletics – Women's 400 metres =

Video on YouTube Official video

These are the official results of the Women's 400 metres event at the 1983 IAAF World Championships in Helsinki, Finland. There were a total number of 35 participating athletes, with five qualifying heats and the final held on Wednesday 10 August 1983.

Jarmila Kratochvílová in lane 3 spent much of the race chasing Mariya Kulchunova-Pinigina to her outside, while Taťána Kocembová quickly made up the stagger on Rosalyn Bryant between the two Czech teammates. Kratochvílová finally made up the stagger on Pinigina in the middle of the final turn and came onto the home stretch barely two meters up on the Soviet and a meter up on her teammate. She widened that to four metres by the finish and Kocembová opened up a similar gap on Pinigina.

Each of the top four competitors in this race set their lifetime best, Kratochvílová only being beaten once with 1985's still standing world record 47.60 by Marita Koch. In addition to Kratochvílová remaining the #2 performer in history, Kocembová is #5, Pinigina is #15. Almost forgotten is #56 Gaby Bußmann, still under 50 seconds.

== Medalists ==
Gold	Jarmila Kratochvílová; Czechoslovakia (TCH)
Silver	Taťána Kocembová; Czechoslovakia (TCH)
Bronze	Mariya Pinigina; Soviet Union (URS)

== Records ==
Existing records at the start of the event.

World Record	Marita Koch (GDR)	48.16	Athens, Greece	September 8, 1982
Championship Record	New event			

== Final ==
RANK	FINAL	TIME
	Jarmila Kratochvílová (TCH)	47.99 WR
	Taťána Kocembová (TCH)	48.59 PB
	Mariya Pinigina (URS)	49.19 PB
4.	Gaby Bußmann (FRG)	49.75
5.	Marita Payne (CAN)	50.06
6.	Irina Baskakova (URS)	50.48
7.	Dagmar Rübsam (GDR)	50.48
8.	Rosalyn Bryant (USA)	50.66

== Semifinals ==
- Held on Tuesday 9 August 1983

RANK	HEAT 1	TIME
1.	Jarmila Kratochvílová (TCH)	51.08
2.	Gaby Bußmann (FRG)	51.22
3.	Irina Baskakova (URS)	51.26
4.	Dagmar Rübsam (GDR)	51.52
5.	Charmaine Crooks (CAN)	51.96
6.	Denean Howard (USA)	52.06
7.	Judit Forgács (HUN)	52.74
8.	Rositsa Stamenova (BUL)	53.09

RANK	HEAT 2	TIME
1.	Mariya Pinigina (URS)	50.07
2.	Taťána Kocembová (TCH)	50.45
3.	Marita Payne (CAN)	50.78
4.	Rosalyn Bryant (USA)	51.04
5.	Sabine Busch (GDR)	51.09
6.	Michelle Scutt (GBR)	51.88
7.	Molly Killingbeck (CAN)	51.97
8.	Katya Ilieva (BUL)	52.34

== Quarterfinals ==
- Held on Monday 8 August 1983

RANK	HEAT 1	TIME
1.	Mariya Pinigina (URS)	51.05
2.	Rosalyn Bryant (USA)	51.44
3.	Sabine Busch (GDR)	51.46
4.	Charmaine Crooks (CAN)	51.57
5.	Denise Boyd (AUS)	52.03
6.	Cathy Rattray-Williams (JAM)	53.78
	Margarita Grun (URU)	DNS
	Cornelia Baptiste (LCA)	DNS

RANK	HEAT 2	TIME
1.	Irina Baskakova (URS)	51.07
2.	Gaby Bußmann (FRG)	51.15
3.	Dagmar Rübsam (GDR)	51.62
4.	Molly Killingbeck (CAN)	52.25
5.	Roberta Belle (USA)	53.43
6.	Elanga Buala (PNG)	56.96
7.	Iyiechia Petrus (ISV)	57.24
	Hala El Moughrabi (SYR)	DNS

RANK	HEAT 3	TIME
1.	Marita Payne (CAN)	52.23
2.	Katya Ilieva (BUL)	52.37
3.	Jarmila Kratochvílová (TCH)	52.40
4.	Michelle Scutt (GBR)	52.70
5.	June Griffith (GUY)	53.47
6.	Leticia Athanas (TAN)	56.92
7.	Irina Ambulo (PAN)	58.33
	Sandra Liburd (SKN)	DNS

RANK	HEAT 4	TIME
1.	Taťána Kocembová (TCH)	51.88
2.	Judit Forgács (HUN)	52.18
3.	Rositsa Stamenova (BUL)	52.22
4.	Denean Howard (USA)	52.34
5.	Erica Rossi (ITA)	53.88
6.	Patricia Meigham (GUA)	59.85
	Eucaris Caicedo (COL)	DNS
	Fatalmoudou Touré (MLI)	DNS

== Qualifying heats ==
- Held on Sunday 7 August 1983

RANK	HEAT 1	TIME
1.	Jarmila Kratochvílová (TCH)	52.42
2.	Molly Killingbeck (CAN)	52.62
3.	Roberta Belle (USA)	53.01
4.	Michelle Scutt (GBR)	53.30
5.	Erica Rossi (ITA)	53.51
6.	Hala El Moughrabi (SYR)	59.58
7.	Marjorie Gentle (BIZ)	1:04.00

RANK	HEAT 2	TIME
1.	Rositsa Stamenova (BUL)	53.81
2.	Gaby Bußmann (FRG)	53.93
3.	June Griffith (GUY)	54.02
4.	Eucaris Caicedo (COL)	55.09
5.	Judit Forgács (HUN)	55.15
6.	Leticia Athanas (TAN)	56.54
7.	Sandra Liburd (SKN)	1:02.46

RANK	HEAT 3	TIME
1.	Taťána Kocembová (TCH)	52.74
2.	Denean Howard (USA)	52.78
3.	Katya Ilieva (BUL)	53.21
4.	Cathy Rattray-Williams (JAM)	53.40
5.	Elanga Buala (PNG)	57.37
6.	Fatalmoudou Touré (MLI)	59.37
	Florence Gaza (SOL)	DNS

RANK	HEAT 4	TIME
1.	Mariya Pinigina (URS)	52.49
2.	Charmaine Crooks (CAN)	53.83
3.	Dagmar Rübsam (GDR)	54.47
4.	Denise Boyd (AUS)	54.70
5.	Iyiechia Petrus (ISV)	55.87
6.	Margarita Grun (URU)	56.84
7.	Cornelia Baptiste (LCA)	1:00.79

RANK	HEAT 5	TIME
1.	Sabine Busch (GDR)	53.16
2.	Irina Baskakova (URS)	53.45
3.	Rosalyn Bryant (USA)	53.64
4.	Marita Payne (CAN)	53.96
5.	Irina Ambulo (PAN)	56.08
6.	Patricia Meigham (GUA)	58.07
	Rose Tata-Muya (KEN)	DNS
