= 1982 European Athletics Championships – Men's 4 × 400 metres relay =

Men's 4 × 400 metres relay at the European Athletics Championships

These are the official results of the Men's 4 × 400 metres event at the 1982 European Championships in Athens, Greece, held at Olympic Stadium "Spiros Louis" on 10 and 11 September 1982.

== Medalists ==
| Gold | Erwin Skamrahl; Harald Schmid; Thomas Giessing; Hartmut Weber; West Germany |
| Silver | David Jenkins; Garry Cook; Todd Bennett; Phil Brown; United Kingdom |
| Bronze | Aleksandr Troshchilo; Pavel Roshchin; Pavel Konovalov; Viktor Markin; Soviet Union |

== Results ==
=== Final ===
11 September

| Rank | Nation | Competitors | Time | Notes |
|---|---|---|---|---|
| 1st place, gold medalist(s) | West Germany | Erwin Skamrahl; Harald Schmid; Thomas Giessing; Hartmut Weber | 3:00.51 | CR |
| 2nd place, silver medalist(s) | United Kingdom | David Jenkins; Garry Cook; Todd Bennett; Phil Brown | 3:00.68 | |
| 3rd place, bronze medalist(s) | Soviet Union | Aleksandr Troshchilo; Pavel Roshchin; Pavel Konovalov; Viktor Markin | 3:00.80 | |
| 4 | Poland | Ryszard Wichrowski; Ryszard Szparak; Andrzej Stępień; Ryszard Podlas | 3:02.77 | |
| 5 | Czechoslovakia | Miroslav Zahorak; František Břečka; Dušan Malovec; Stanislav Sajdok | 3:02.82 | |
| 6 | Italy | Pietro Mennea; Roberto Tozzi; Roberto Ribaud; Mauro Zuliani | 3:03.21 | |
| 7 | France | Paul Bourdin; Aldo Canti; Didier Dubois; Pascal Barré | 3:04.73 | |
| 8 | Sweden | Sven Nylander; Eric Josjö; Per-Ola Olsson; Staffan Blomstrand | 3:06.91 | |

=== Heats ===
10 September

==== Heat 1 ====
| Rank | Nation | Competitors | Time | Notes |
|---|---|---|---|---|
| 1 | United Kingdom | David Jenkins; Garry Cook; Todd Bennett; Phil Brown | 3:02.52 | Q |
| 2 | Soviet Union | Pavel Konovalov; Pavel Roshchin; Vladimir Prosin; Aleksandr Troshchilo | 3:02.98 | Q |
| 3 | Czechoslovakia | František Břečka; Dušan Malovec; Miroslav Zahorak; Stanislav Sajdok | 3:03.06 | Q |
| 4 | Italy | Roberto Tozzi; Roberto Ribaud; Pietro Mennea; Mauro Zuliani | 3:03.66 | q |
| 5 | Sweden | Sven Nylander; Staffan Blomstrand; Eric Josjö; Per-Ola Olsson | 3:05.32 | q |
| 6 | Yugoslavia | Ismail Mačev; Goran Humar; Jozef Kereši; Željko Knapić | 3:08.44 | |

==== Heat 2 ====
| Rank | Nation | Competitors | Time | Notes |
|---|---|---|---|---|
| 1 | Poland | Ryszard Wichrowski; Ryszard Szparak; Ryszard Podlas; Andrzej Stępień | 3:05.31 | Q |
| 2 | West Germany | Erwin Skamrahl; Harald Schmid; Edgar Nakladal; Hartmut Weber | 3:05.35 | Q |
| 3 | France | Paul Bourdin; Aldo Canti; Didier Dubois; Pascal Barré | 3:05.49 | Q |
| 4 | Switzerland | Andreas Kaufmann; Urs Kamber; René Gloor; Rolf Gisler | 3:05.64 | |
| 5 | Greece | Georgios Vamvakas; Nikolaos Megalemos; Panagiotis Stefanopoulos; Athanassios Kalogiannis | 3:09.42 | |
| | Spain | Benjamín González; Marceliano Ruiz; Colomán Trabado; Ángel Heras | DNF | |

== Participation ==
According to an unofficial count, 50 athletes from 12 countries participated in the event.

- Czechoslovakia (4)
- France (4)
- Greece (4)
- Italy (4)
- Poland (4)
- Soviet Union (5)
- Spain (4)
- Sweden (4)
- Switzerland (4)
- United Kingdom (4)
- West Germany (5)
- Yugoslavia (4)

== See also ==
- 1978 Men's European Championships 4 × 400 m Relay (Prague)
- 1980 Men's Olympic 4 × 400 m Relay (Moscow)
- 1983 Men's World Championships 4 × 400 m Relay (Helsinki)
- 1984 Men's Olympic 4 × 400 m Relay (Los Angeles)
- 1986 Men's European Championships 4 × 400 m Relay (Stuttgart)
- 1987 Men's World Championships 4 × 400 m Relay (Rome)
- 1988 Men's Olympic 4 × 400 m Relay (Seoul)
- 1990 Men's European Championships 4 × 400 m Relay (Split)
