= 1983 World Championships in Athletics – Women's 4 × 400 metres relay =

The 4 × 400 metres relay at the 1983 World Championships in Athletics was held at the Helsinki Olympic Stadium on August 13 and August 14.

== Medals ==
| Gold | Silver | Bronze |
|---|---|---|
| East Germany; Kerstin Walther; Sabine Busch; Marita Koch; Dagmar Rübsam | Czechoslovakia; Tatána Kocembová; Milena Matějkovičová; Zuzana Moravčíková; Jarmila Kratochvílová | Soviet Union; Yelena Korban; Marina Ivanova; Irina Baskakova; Mariya Pinigina |

== Records ==
Existing records at the start of the event.

| World record | East Germany (GDR) | 3:19.04 | Athens, Greece | September 11, 1982 |
| Championship record | New event | | | |

== Results ==
=== Heats ===
All times shown are in minutes.

AR area record | CR championship record | GR games record | NR national record | OR Olympic record | PB personal best | SB season best | WL world leading (in a given season)
DNS = did not start | DQ = disqualification | NM = no mark (i.e. no valid result) | Q = qualification by place in heat | q = qualification by overall place

==== Heat 1 ====
1. United States (Roberta Belle, Easter Gabriel, Rosalyn Bryant, Denean Howard) 3:26.82 Q
2. Canada (Charmaine Crooks, Jillian Richardson, Molly Killingbeck, Marita Payne) 3:27.21 Q
3. Czechoslovakia (Milena Matějkovičová, Zuzana Moravčíková, Taťána Kocembová, Jarmila Kratochvílová) 3:27.60 Q
4. West Germany (Rita Daimer, Ute Thimm, Gisela Gottwald, Gaby Bußmann) 3:29.70 q
5. Romania (Iulia Radu, Daniela Matei, Cristieana Cojocaru, Elena Lina) 3:30.96 q

==== Heat 2 ====
1. Soviet Union (Yelena Korban, Marina Ivanova, Irina Baskakova, Mariya Pinigina) 3:28.77 Q
2. East Germany (Kerstin Walther, Undine Bremer, Ellen Fiedler, Sabine Busch) 3:29.05 Q
3. Bulgaria (Svobodka Damyanova, Rositsa Stamenova, Katya Ilieva, Galina Penkova) 3:31.11 Q
4. Jamaica (Cathy Rattray, Ovrill Dwyer-Brown, Jacqueline Pusey, Grace Jackson) 3:34.17
5. Puerto Rico (Madeline De Jesus, Vilma Paris, Margaret De Jesus, Nilsa Paris) 3:42.79

=== Final ===
1. East Germany (Kerstin Walther, Sabine Busch, Marita Koch, Dagmar Rübsam) 3:19.73
2. Czechoslovakia (Taťána Kocembová, Milena Matějkovičová, Zuzana Moravčíková, Jarmila Kratochvílová) 3:20.32
3. Soviet Union (Yelena Korban, Marina Ivanova, Irina Baskakova, Mariya Pinigina) 3:21.16
4. Canada (Charmaine Crooks, Jillian Richardson, Molly Killingbeck, Marita Payne) 3:27.41
5. United States (Roberta Belle, Easter Gabriel, Rosalyn Bryant, Denean Howard) 3:27.57
6. West Germany (Rita Daimer, Ute Thimm, Gisela Gottwald, Gaby Bußmann) 3:29.43
7. Bulgaria (Svobodka Damyanova, Rositsa Stamenova, Katya Ilieva, Galina Penkova) 3:30.36
8. Romania (Iulia Radu, Daniela Matei, Cristieana Cojocaru, Elena Lina) 3:35.61
