= 1984 European Athletics Indoor Championships – Women's 400 metres =

Women's 400 m event at European Athletics Indoor Championships 1984

The women's 400 metres event at the 1984 European Athletics Indoor Championships was held on 3 and 4 March.

== Medalists ==
Gold	Silver	Bronze
Taťána Kocembová; Czechoslovakia	Erika Rossi; Italy	Rositsa Stamenova; Bulgaria

== Results ==
=== Heats ===
First 2 of each heat (Q) and the next 2 fastest (q) qualified for the semifinals.

Rank	Heat	Name	Nationality	Time	Notes
1	2	Taťána Kocembová	Czechoslovakia	53.01	Q
2	2	Regine Berg	Belgium	53.23	Q
3	1	Rositsa Stamenova	Bulgaria	53.62	Q
4	1	Erika Rossi	Italy	53.85	Q
5	2	Elżbieta Kapusta	Poland	54.15	q
6	1	Astrid Brun	Norway	54.44	q
7	3	Małgorzata Dunecka	Poland	54.91	Q
8	3	Katya Ilieva	Bulgaria	55.80	Q
9	1	Esther Lahoz	Spain	56.14	
	3	Cosetta Campana	Italy	DQ	

=== Semifinals ===
First 2 from each semifinal qualified directly (Q) for the final.

Rank	Heat	Name	Nationality	Time	Notes
1	1	Regine Berg	Belgium	53.13	Q, NR
2	1	Rositsa Stamenova	Bulgaria	53.21	Q
3	2	Taťána Kocembová	Czechoslovakia	53.41	Q
4	2	Erika Rossi	Italy	53.43	Q
5	2	Małgorzata Dunecka	Poland	53.94	
6	1	Elżbieta Kapusta	Poland	53.97	
7	1	Astrid Brun	Norway	55.00	
8	2	Katya Ilieva	Bulgaria	55.30	

=== Final ===
Rank	Name	Nationality	Time	Notes
1st place, gold medalist(s)	Taťána Kocembová	Czechoslovakia	49.97	
2nd place, silver medalist(s)	Erika Rossi	Italy	52.37	
3rd place, bronze medalist(s)	Rositsa Stamenova	Bulgaria	52.41	
4	Regine Berg	Belgium	53.41	
