= Athletics at the 1980 Summer Olympics – Women's 200 metres =

Women's 200 metres at the Games of the XXII Olympiad
- Venue: Central Lenin Stadium
- Dates: 28 July 1980 (heats and quarter-finals); 30 July 1980 (semi-finals and finals)
- Competitors: 41 from 29 nations
- Winning time: 22.03 OR

Medalists
1st place, gold medalist(s)		Bärbel Wöckel; East Germany
2nd place, silver medalist(s)		Natalya Bochina; Soviet Union
3rd place, bronze medalist(s)		Merlene Ottey; Jamaica

These are the official results of the Women's 200 metres event at the 1980 Summer Olympics in Moscow. The competition was held on July 28, 1980, and on July 30, 1980. The winning margin was 0.16 seconds.

== Results ==
=== Final ===
Held on Wednesday July 30, 1980.

RANK	FINAL	TIME
	Bärbel Wöckel (GDR)	22.03 OR
	Natalya Bochina (URS)	22.19 WJR
	Merlene Ottey (JAM)	22.20
4.	Romy Müller (GDR)	22.47
5.	Kathy Smallwood (GBR)	22.61
6.	Beverley Goddard (GBR)	22.72
7.	Denise Boyd (AUS)	22.76
8.	Sonia Lannaman (GBR)	22.80

=== Semifinals ===
- Held on Wednesday July 30, 1980

RANK	HEAT 1	TIME
1.	Merlene Ottey (JAM)	22.32
2.	Bärbel Wöckel (GDR)	22.54
3.	Kathy Smallwood (GBR)	22.65
4.	Beverley Goddard (GBR)	22.73
5.	Chantal Réga (FRA)	22.87
6.	Linda Haglund (SWE)	23.11
7.	Lyudmila Maslakova (URS)	23.27
8.	Galina Penkova (BUL)	23.27

RANK	HEAT 2	TIME
1.	Romy Müller (GDR)	22.72
2.	Natalya Bochina (URS)	22.75
3.	Denise Boyd (AUS)	22.80
4.	Sonia Lannaman (GBR)	22.82
5.	Jackie Pusey (JAM)	22.90
6.	Liliyana Panayotova (BUL)	23.07
7.	Raymonde Naigre (FRA)	23.18
8.	Els Vader (NED)	23.44

=== Quarterfinals ===
Held on Monday July 28, 1980.

RANK	HEAT 1	TIME
1.	Kathy Smallwood (GBR)	22.95
2.	Lyudmila Maslakova (URS)	23.24
3.	Liliyana Panayotova (BUL)	23.29
4.	Jackie Pusey (JAM)	23.35
5.	Els Vader (NED)	23.67
6.	Irén Orosz (HUN)	23.68
7.	Karin Verguts (BEL)	24.00
8.	Françoise Odette Damado (SEN)	24.80

RANK	HEAT 2	TIME
1.	Merlene Ottey (JAM)	22.82
2.	Bärbel Wöckel (GDR)	22.86
3.	Beverley Goddard (GBR)	22.97
4.	Chantal Réga (FRA)	23.29
5.	Galina Penkova (BUL)	23.37
6.	Rufina Ubah (NGR)	23.55
7.	Marisa Masullo (ITA)	23.74
8.	Brigitte Senglaub (SUI)	23.84

RANK	HEAT 3	TIME
1.	Natalya Bochina (URS)	22.26
2.	Romy Müller (GDR)	22.55
3.	Sonia Lannaman (GBR)	22.84
4.	Linda Haglund (SWE)	22.90
5.	Denise Boyd (AUS)	22.91
6.	Raymonde Naigre (FRA)	23.10
7.	Elżbieta Stachurska (POL)	23.11
8.	Nzaeli Kyomo (TAN)	24.59

== Heats ==
Held on Monday July 28, 1980.

Qualification rule: First 3 in each heat (Q) and the next 6 fastest (q) advance to the quarterfinals.

Rank	Heat	Name	Nationality	Time	Notes
1	6	Merlene Ottey	Jamaica	22.70	Q
2	1	Romy Müller	East Germany	23.11	Q
3	6	Kathy Smallwood	Great Britain	23.15	Q
4	1	Liliyana Panayotova	Bulgaria	23.17	Q
5	3	Natalya Bochina	Soviet Union	23.28	Q
6	4	Beverley Goddard	Great Britain	23.35	Q
6	6	Galina Penkova	Bulgaria	23.35	Q
8	1	Rufina Ubah	Nigeria	23.36	Q
8	4	Denise Boyd	Australia	23.36	Q
10	2	Jacqueline Pusey	Jamaica	23.39	Q
11	5	Lyudmila Maslakova	Soviet Union	23.49	Q
11	2	Chantal Réga	France	23.49	Q
13	4	Raymonde Naigre	France	23.50	Q
13	6	Els Vader	Netherlands	23.50	q
15	3	Sonia Lannaman	Great Britain	23.55	Q
15	5	Bärbel Wöckel	East Germany	23.55	Q
17	4	Elżbieta Stachurska	Poland	23.58	q
18	1	Brigitte Senglaub	Switzerland	23.62	q
19	3	Irén Orosz-Árva	Hungary	23.69	Q
20	5	Linda Haglund	Sweden	23.85	Q
21	2	Karin Verguts	Belgium	23.89	Q
22	3	Marisa Masullo	Italy	24.00	q
23	5	Nzaeli Kyomo	Tanzania	24.22	q
24	6	Françoise Odette Damado	Senegal	24.45	q
25	4	Lea Alaerts	Belgium	24.51	
26	6	Nicoleta Lia	Romania	24.54	
27	3	Mosi Ali	Tanzania	24.99	
28	6	P. T. Usha	India	25.16	
29	2	Carmela Bolívar	Peru	25.33	
30	5	Ruth Enang Mesode	Cameroon	25.46	
31	1	Eugenia Osho-Williams	Sierra Leone	25.87	
32	3	Estella Meheux	Sierra Leone	26.77	
33	2	Trần Thị Ngọc Anh	Vietnam	26.83	
34	5	Bessy de Letourdie	Seychelles	26.91	
35	4	Boualong Boungnavong	Laos	30.42	
	1	Heline Laihorinne	Finland	DNS	
	1	Debbie Wells	Australia	DNS	
	2	Karoline Käfer	Austria	DNS	
	3	Jarmila Kratochvílová	Czechoslovakia	DNS	
	5	Lyudmila Kondratyeva	Soviet Union	DNS	
	4	Xiomara Larios	Nicaragua	DNS	

== See also ==
- 1976 Women's Olympic 200 metres (Montreal)
- 1978 Women's European Championships 200 metres (Prague)
- 1982 Women's European Championships 200 metres (Athens)
- 1983 Women's World Championships 200 metres (Helsinki)
- 1984 Women's Olympic 200 metres (Los Angeles)
