= Svobodka Damyanova =

Bulgarian sprinter

Svobodka Damyanova (Bulgarian: Свободка Дамянова, born 13 July 1955) is a retired Bulgarian sprinter who specialized in the women's 400 metres.

She was born in Sofia, and represented the clubs CSKA and Septemvrisko Zname. She finished eighth in the 4 x 400 metres relay at the 1983 World Championships, with teammates Rositsa Stamenova, Katya Ilieva and Galina Penkova. She also competed at the 1980 Olympic Games. Here she failed to progress in the 400 metres. She also competed in the relay final, but the Bulgarian team failed to finish the race.

She became Bulgarian 400 metres champion in 1976 and 800 metres champion in 1984. She became Bulgarian indoor champion in the 400 metres in 1985 and in the 800 metres in 1983.

Her personal best time was 51.63 seconds, achieved in June 1980 in Sofia.
