= 1988 European Athletics Indoor Championships – Women's 400 metres =

Women's 400 metres event at the 1988 European Athletics Indoor Championships

The women's 400 metres event at the 1988 European Athletics Indoor Championships was held on the 5th and 6 March.

== Medalists ==
Gold	Silver	Bronze
Petra Müller; East Germany	Helga Arendt; West Germany	Dagmar Neubauer; East Germany

== Results ==
=== Heats ===
First 3 from each heat (Q) and the next 3 fastest (q) qualified for the semifinals.

Rank	Heat	Name	Nationality	Time	Notes
1	1	Gisela Kinzel	West Germany	52.49	Q
2	1	Marina Shmonina	Soviet Union	52.51	Q
3	1	Dagmar Neubauer	East Germany	52.54	Q
4	2	Rositsa Stamenova	Bulgaria	52.68	Q
5	2	Helga Arendt	West Germany	52.79	Q
6	2	Erzsébet Szabó	Hungary	52.81	Q
7	2	Alena Paříková	Czechoslovakia	52.87	q
8	1	Judit Forgács	Hungary	53.01	q
9	2	Cristina Pérez	Spain	53.09	q
10	3	Petra Müller	East Germany	53.42	Q
11	3	Sally Gunnell	Great Britain	53.59	Q
12	1	Esther Lahoz	Spain	53.66	
13	3	Fabienne Ficher	France	53.95	Q
14	3	Christina Sussiek	West Germany	54.19	
15	3	Noémi Bátori	Hungary	54.58	

=== Semifinals ===
First 3 from each semifinal qualified directly (Q) for the final.

Rank	Heat	Name	Nationality	Time	Notes
1	1	Petra Müller	East Germany	51.40	Q
2	2	Helga Arendt	West Germany	51.79	Q
3	2	Dagmar Neubauer	East Germany	51.95	Q
4	1	Rositsa Stamenova	Bulgaria	52.12	Q
5	2	Sally Gunnell	Great Britain	52.22	Q
6	1	Gisela Kinzel	West Germany	52.33	Q
7	1	Erzsébet Szabó	Hungary	52.47	
8	2	Marina Shmonina	Soviet Union	52.48	
9	2	Cristina Pérez	Spain	53.01	
10	2	Judit Forgács	Hungary	53.16	
11	1	Fabienne Ficher	France	53.17	
12	1	Alena Paříková	Czechoslovakia	53.22	

=== Final ===
Rank	Lane	Name	Nationality	Time	Notes
1st place, gold medalist(s)	5	Petra Müller	East Germany	50.28	
2nd place, silver medalist(s)	3	Helga Arendt	West Germany	51.06	
3rd place, bronze medalist(s)	4	Dagmar Neubauer	East Germany	51.57	
4	6	Sally Gunnell	Great Britain	51.77	
5	1	Gisela Kinzel	West Germany	52.46	
6	2	Rositsa Stamenova	Bulgaria	53.89	
