= Andrzej Stępień =

Polish sprinter

Personal information
- Born: 14 July 1953 Cieplice Śląskie, Poland
- Height: 1.80 m (5 ft 11 in)
- Weight: 76 kg (168 lb)

Sport
- Sport: Athletics
- Event: 400 metres
- Club: Karkonosze Jelenia Góra; Śląsk Wrocław; Flota Gdynia
- Coached by: Jerzy Kil

Andrzej Stępień (born 14 July 1953 in Cieplice Śląskie) is a Polish former sprinter who specialised in the 400 metres. He represented his country at the 1980 Summer Olympics and 1983 World Championships. He was a national outdoor 400 metres champion each year between 1981 and 1986.

His personal bests in the event are 46.10 seconds outdoors (Budapest 1981) and 47.08 seconds indoors (Pireaus 1985).

== International competitions ==
Year	Competition	Venue	Position	Event	Notes
Representing Poland
1980	Olympic Games	Moscow, Soviet Union	16th (qf)	400 m	46.31
1980	Olympic Games	Moscow, Soviet Union	9th (h)	4 × 400 m relay	3:05.8
1982	European Championships	Athens, Greece	15th (sf)	400 m	47.28
1982	European Championships	Athens, Greece	4th	4 × 400 m relay	3:02.77
1983	World Championships	Helsinki, Finland	10th (sf)	4 × 400 m relay	3:05.51^{1}
1984	Friendship Games	Moscow, Soviet Union	5th	4 × 400 m relay	3:06.03
1985	European Indoor Championships	Piraeus, Greece	7th (sf)	400 m	47.23

^{1}Did not finish in the final
