= Athletics at the 1983 Summer Universiade – Women's 400 metres =

The women's 400 metres event at the 1983 Summer Universiade was held at the Commonwealth Stadium in Edmonton, Canada on 6 and 7 July 1983.

== Medalists ==
Gold	Silver	Bronze
Mariya Pinigina; Soviet Union	Molly Killingbeck; Canada	Yelena Korban; Soviet Union

== Results ==
=== Heats ===
Rank	Heat	Athlete	Nationality	Time	Notes
1	2	Mariya Pinigina	Soviet Union	50.54	Q
2	2	Molly Killingbeck	Canada	51.30	Q
3	1	Yelena Korban	Soviet Union	51.62	Q
4	1	Charmaine Crooks	Canada	52.51	Q
5	2	Sharon Dabney	United States	52.70	Q
6	2	Erica Rossi	Italy	52.71	q
7	1	Easter Gabriel	United States	52.84	Q
8	1	Leanne Evans	Australia	53.00	q
9	2	Frederica Wright	Jamaica	55.25	
10	1	Sarra Touibi	Tunisia	56.39	
11	2	Selma Anene	Tunisia	58.37	
12	1	Ana Daio	Angola	1:03.34	

=== Final ===
Rank	Athlete	Nationality	Time	Notes
1st place, gold medalist(s)	Mariya Pinigina	Soviet Union	50.47	
2nd place, silver medalist(s)	Molly Killingbeck	Canada	51.94	
3rd place, bronze medalist(s)	Yelena Korban	Soviet Union	52.07	
4	Charmaine Crooks	Canada	52.17	
5	Easter Gabriel	United States	52.88	
6	Sharon Dabney	United States	52.91	
7	Leanne Evans	Australia	53.50	
8	Erica Rossi	Italy	53.99	
