= Georg von Freymann =

German physicist (born 1972)

- Scientific career
- Fields: Physics
- Workplaces: University of Karlsruhe; University of Kaiserslautern; Fraunhofer Institute for Industrial Mathematics (ITWM)

Georg von Freymann is a German experimental physicist and professor of physics at the Technical University of Kaiserslautern and head of the "Optical Technologies and Photonics" research group there.

== Academic career ==
Georg von Freymann studied physics at the University of Karlsruhe from 1992 to 1998 and received his Ph.D. there in 2001 on the energy level statistics of excitons in semiconductors. During postdoctoral stays at the Research Center Karlsruhe and the University of Toronto (there in the groups of Sajeev John and Geoffrey A. Ozin), von Freymann focused on the field of three-dimensional photonic crystals. As head of a DFG Emmy Noether junior research group at the Institute of Nanotechnology of the Karlsruhe Institute of Technology (KIT), von Freymann worked from 2005 to 2010 in particular on the fabrication of three-dimensional photonic nanostructures. In 2009, he followed the call as a substitute professor for applied physics at KIT and moved to the Technical University of Kaiserslautern as a professor in 2010.

From 2007 to 2014, von Freymann was Technical Director of Nanoscribe GmbH, a company he co-founded in 2007. Among others, this company was awarded the DPG Technology Transfer Award in 2018. In addition to his work at the university, von Freymann was a group leader from 2011 to 2014 at the Fraunhofer Institute for Physical Measurement Techniques in Freiburg and has been a department head since 2013. His department for materials characterization and testing was incorporated into the Fraunhofer Institute for Industrial Mathematics in Kaiserslautern in 2017. He co-founded Opti-Cal GmbH in 2018, and is head of the Nanostructuring Center at the Technical University of Kaiserslautern since 2021. Von Freymann is a member of the Collaborative Research Centers SFB 926 "Component Surfaces", the SFB/Transregio 173 "Spin+X: Spin in its collective environment", the SFB/Transregio 185 "Open system control of atomic and photonic matter" of the German Research Foundation, and the State Research Center for Optics and Material Sciences at the Technical University of Kaiserslautern

== Awards and honours ==
- 2003-2005: DFG research fellowship, stay at the University of Toronto, Toronto, Canada
- 2005-2010: Emmy Noether Junior Research Group, DFG
- 2014: SPIE PRISM Award for 3D Printing (Nanoscribe GmbH)
- Seit 2014: Vice speaker of the research building "Laboratory of Advanced Spin Engineering (LASE)", TU Kaiserslautern (new research building according to Art. 91b GG)
- 2018: DPG Technology Transfer Award (Nanoscribe GmbH)
- 2018: 1st prize at the Baden-Württemberg state award for young companies (Nanoscribe GmbH)
- 2020: Innovation award of the state of Rhineland-Palatinate for 3D printing (Opti-Cal GmbH)

== Research ==
Georg von Freymann's research spans from basic principles to industrial applications. The focus is on the technology of three-dimensional microprinting, which is mainly used for applications in photonics ranging from optical quantum simulators and bio-inspired photonic structures to calibration standards for areal optical metrology. His work also focuses on terahertz technology, ranging from terahertz wave generation and detection to industrial applications in nondestructive testing. The recently established terahertz quantum sensing technology opens up a completely new approach to terahertz metrology, since it eliminates the need for direct detection of the terahertz waves by suitably entangling the photons and transfers the information into the visible spectral range.

== Publications ==
Georg von Freymann has published more than 190 papers in peer-reviewed international journals.
