= Pavel Konovalov =

Pavel Konovalov is the name of:

- Pavel Konovalov (officer) (1908-1945), Soviet army officer and Hero of the Soviet Union
- Pavel Konovalov (sprinter) (born 1960), Soviet sprinter
- Pavel Konovalov (canoeist) (born 1967), Russian canoeist
