= Lead-DBS =

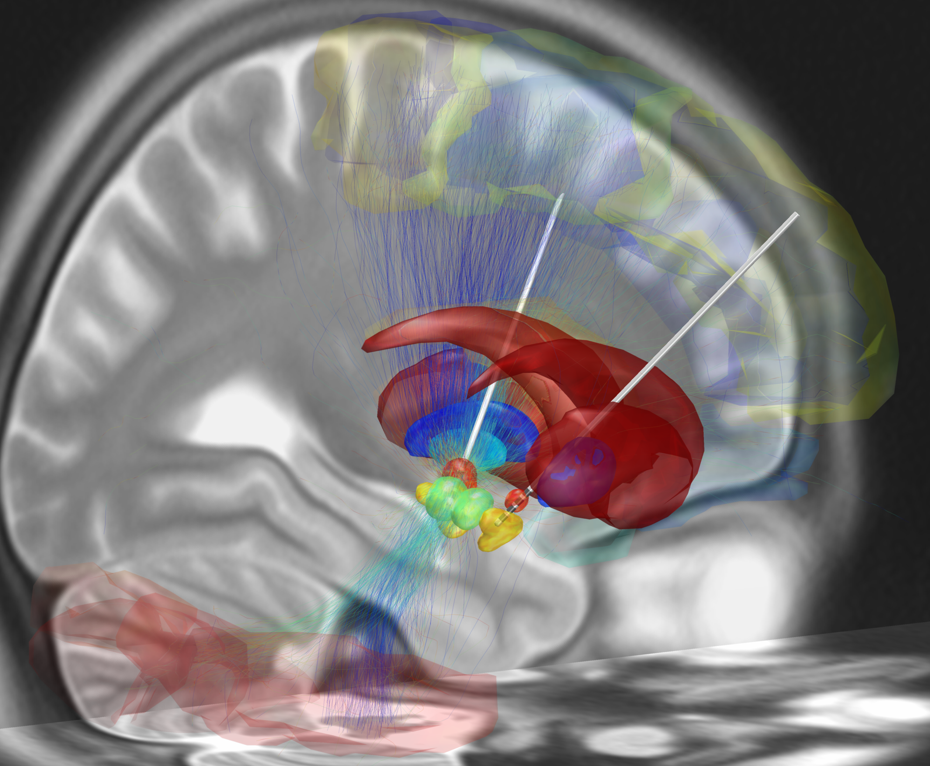
- Sample Lead-DBS session.
- Original author(s): Andreas Horn
- Developer(s): Mass General Brigham
- Operating system: Cross-platform
- Type: Neuroimaging data analysis
- License: GPL
- Website: www.lead-dbs.org

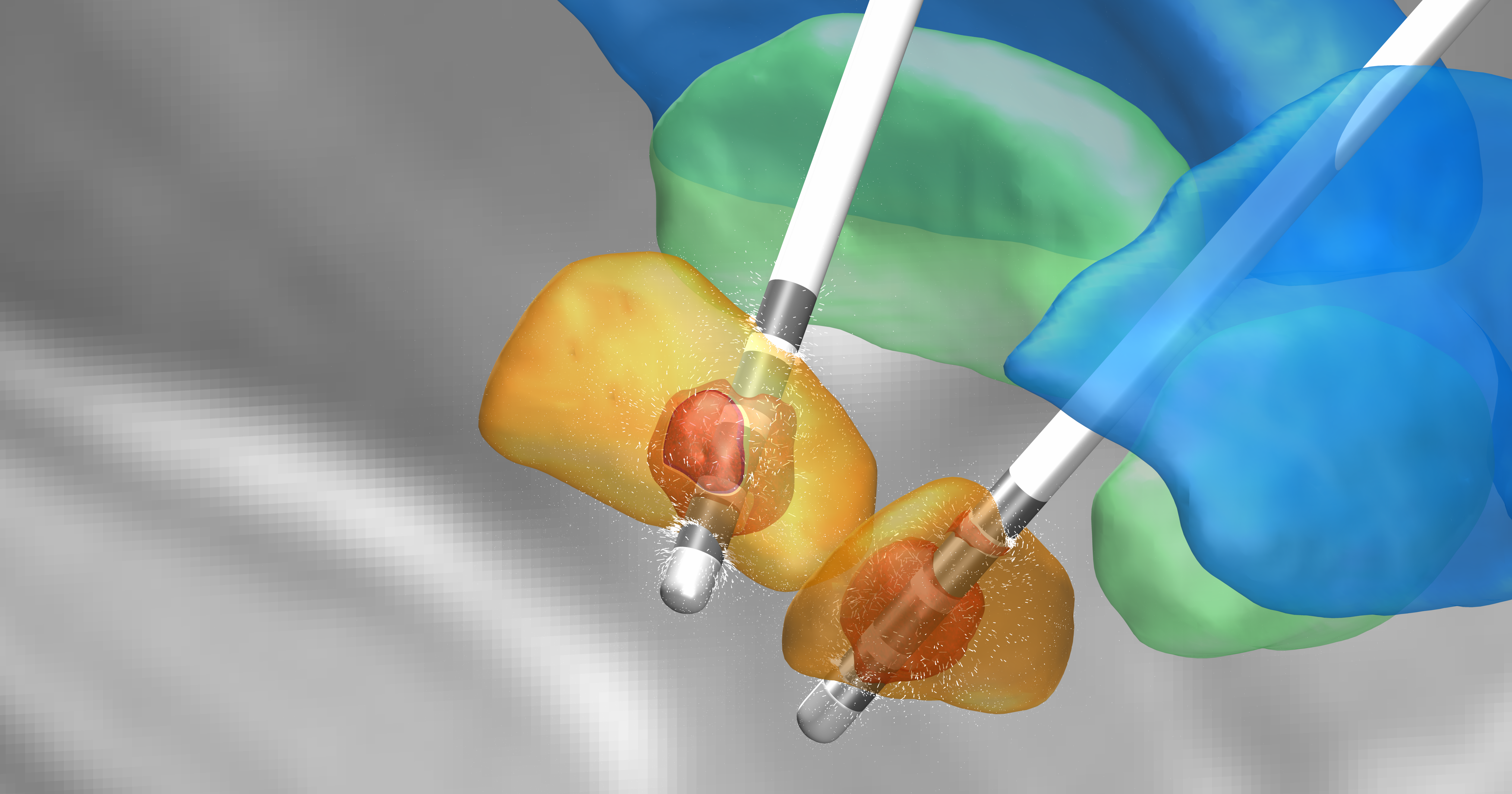
Electrode reconstruction generated with Lead-DBS. The picture shows two electrodes implanted into the subthalamic nucleus (orange) for treatment of Parkinson's disease. Other structures: Stimulation volumes (red), internal (green) and external (cyan) parts of the pallidum.

Lead-DBS is an open-source toolbox for reconstructions and modeling of Deep Brain Stimulation electrodes based on pre- and postoperative MRI & CT imaging.

Lead-DBS is available as a MATLAB toolbox or standalone binary for Windows, OS X and Linux. Besides MATLAB code, it contains a miniforge Python environment, as well as code modules that were compiled from Fortran and C. Parts of its code build upon other open-source tools available to the neuroimaging community, such as SPM, FSL, 3DSlicer, OSS-DBS, FreeSurfer, FieldTrip or Advanced Normalization tools. Lead-DBS was originally developed at the Charité Berlin beginning in 2012 by Andreas Horn and has been freely available for research use under the GNU General Public License since 2014. Since then, the toolbox has grown into an open-source project from an active development and user base at numerous institutions such as Mass General Brigham / Harvard Medical School, University of Cologne, University of Luxembourg and University of Melbourne. According to the toolbox website, the software has been downloaded over 65,000 times and has been used in over 500 scientific publications. Funding for continued development included an Emmy Noether award by the German Research Foundation as well as an R01 grant by the National Institute of Mental Health. Since 2014, Lead-DBS has been extended by the group analysis module Lead Group, the connectome processing tools Lead Connectome and Lead Mapper, the intraoperative module Lead-OR, as well as an interface with the biophysical modeling toolbox OSS-DBS. In 2018 and 2023, scientific articles describing versions 2 and 3 of the software have been published, respectively.

== Notability and impact ==
According to Husch and colleagues, Lead-DBS is 'arguably the most established toolbox providing a semi-automatic framework for electrode localization' and Milchenko and colleagues described the tool as 'widely used'. Regarding the open-source nature of the software, Latorre and colleagues reported that 'A commitment of the community to open science will also democratize and increase the speed of advances with high uptake of currently available initiatives such as Lead-DBS'. The software has been used in a prospective clinical trial which showed that subthalamic stimulation settings in patients with Parkinson's disease which were generated with Lead-DBS were non-inferior to standard of care treatment. In 2022, the software was used to define optimal stimulation networks for DBS in Alzheimer's disease. In 2024, a new algorithm implemented with Lead-DBS was used to personalize DBS treatment in Parkinson's disease. Research carried out with Lead-DBS was featured at major news outlets, such as CNN and Fox News.

== See also ==
- National Institute of Mental Health
- Neuroimaging
- Statistical parametric mapping
