= Jens Hübler =

German sprinter (born 1961)

Jens Hübler (born 28 August 1961) is a retired East German sprinter who specialized in the 100 and 200 metres.

He finished fourth in the 4 x 100 metres relay at the 1983 World Championships, along with teammates Andreas Knebel, Thomas Schröder and Frank Emmelmann. He represented the sports team SC Dynamo Berlin and won three bronze medals at the East German championships.
