= Waldemar Golanko =

Polish athlete

Personal information
- Born: 15 July 1961 (age 65) Biała Podlaska, Poland

Sport
- Sport: Track and field
- Events: Long jump, triple jump

Achievements and titles
- Personal bests: Long jump: 8.01 m (1979); Triple jump: 16.29 m (1984)

Waldemar Golanko (born 15 July 1961 in Biała Podlaska, Poland) is a retired Polish long and triple jumper.

He finished ninth in triple jump at the 1984 European Indoor Championships. He became Polish indoor triple jump champion in 1985 and 1986. His personal best triple jump was 16.29 metres, achieved in 1984.

Golanko is also known for his personal best long jump of 8.01 metres, achieved in June 1979 in Bielefeld. In this event he took a bronze medal at the 1979 European Junior Championships.
