= Esther Lahoz =

Spanish sprinter (born 1963)

Personal information
- Born: 2 May 1963 (age 63) Pancrudo, Spain
- Height: 1.67 m (5 ft 6 in)
- Weight: 55 kg (121 lb)

Sport
- Sport: Track and field
- Event: 400 metres
Medal record
Representing Spain
Mediterranean Games
Bronze medal – third place	1991 Athens	4x400m relay
Bronze medal – third place	1997 Bari	4x400m relay

Esther Lahoz Castelló (born 2 May 1963) is a retired Spanish sprinter who specialised in the 400 metres. She represented her country in the 4 × 400 metres relay at the 1992 Summer Olympics, as well as three consecutive World Championships, starting in 1991.

== Competition record ==
Year	Competition	Venue	Position	Event	Notes
Representing Spain
1983	Ibero-American Championships	Barcelona, Spain	2nd	4 × 400 m relay	3:41.30
1984	European Indoor Championships	Gothenburg, Sweden	9th (h)	400 m	56.14
1986	European Championships	Stuttgart, West Germany	6th	4 × 400 m relay	3:32.51
1986	Ibero-American Championships	Havana, Cuba	6th	400 m	55.08
1986	Ibero-American Championships	Havana, Cuba	2nd	4 × 400 m relay	3:36.82
1987	Universiade	Zagreb, Yugoslavia	17th (sf)	200 m	24.63
1987	Universiade	Zagreb, Yugoslavia	15th (h)	400 m	54.96
1988	European Indoor Championships	Budapest, Hungary	12th (h)	400 m	53.66
1988	Ibero-American Championships	Mexico City, Mexico	10th (h)	400 m	55.20
1988	Ibero-American Championships	Mexico City, Mexico	2nd	4 × 400 m relay	3:32.54
1989	European Indoor Championships	The Hague, Netherlands	7th (h)	400 m	54.67
1989	Universiade	Duisburg, West Germany	11th (h)	400 m hurdles	59.74
1989	World Cup	Barcelona, Spain	6th	400 m hurdles	58.56
1990	European Championships	Split, Yugoslavia	9th (h)	4 × 400 m relay	3:31.76
1990	Ibero-American Championships	Manaus, Brazil	8th	400 m	55.00
1990	Ibero-American Championships	Manaus, Brazil	2nd	4 × 400 m relay	3:35.2
1991	World Indoor Championships	Seville, Spain	4th	4 × 400 m relay	3:31.86
1991	Mediterranean Games	Athens, Greece	4th	400 m	53.47
1991	Mediterranean Games	Athens, Greece	3rd	4 × 400 m relay	3:34.21
1991	World Championships	Tokyo, Japan	8th (h)	4 × 400 m relay	3:29.12
1992	Ibero-American Championships	Seville, Spain	6th (h)	400 m	54.21
1992	Ibero-American Championships	Seville, Spain	2nd	4 × 400 m relay	3:34.22
1992	Olympic Games	Barcelona, Spain	10th (h)	4 × 400 m relay	3:31.35
1993	World Championships	Stuttgart, Germany	12th (h)	4 × 400 m relay	3:38.61
1995	World Championships	Gothenburg, Sweden	13th (h)	4 × 400 m relay	3:31.71
1997	Mediterranean Games	Bari, Italy	4th	400 m	52.67
1997	Mediterranean Games	Bari, Italy	3rd	4 × 400 m relay	3:31.93
1998	Ibero-American Championships	Lisbon, Portugal	2nd	400 m hurdles	57.40
1998	Ibero-American Championships	Lisbon, Portugal	3rd	4 × 400 m relay	3:33.97

== Personal bests ==
Outdoor

- 100 metres – 11.96 (+1.9 m/s) (Gavá 1998)
- 200 metres – 23.82 (+1.8 m/s) (Madrid 1991)
- 400 metres – 52.67 (Bari 1997)
- 400 metres hurdles – 57.40 (Lisbon 1998)

Indoor

- 60 metres – 7.74 (San Sebastián 1997)
- 200 metres – 25.15 (San Sebastián 1997)
- 400 metres – 53.39 (Valencia 1988)
