= Athletics at the 1987 Summer Universiade – Women's 200 metres =

The women's 200 metres event at the 1987 Summer Universiade was held at the Stadion Maksimir in Zagreb on 16 and 17 July 1987.

== Medalists ==
| Gold | Silver | Bronze |
|---|---|---|
| Gwen Torrence; United States | Mary Onyali; Nigeria | Dannette Young; United States |

== Results ==
=== Heats ===
Held on 16 July

Wind:
Heat 1: +0.1 m/s, Heat 2: ? m/s, Heat 3: ? m/s, Heat 4: -1.6 m/s, Heat 5: 0.0 m/s, Heat 6: ? m/s

| Rank | Heat | Athlete | Nationality | Time | Notes |
|---|---|---|---|---|---|
| 1 | 6 | Mary Onyali | Nigeria | 23.13 | Q |
| 2 | 5 | Dannette Young | United States | 23.15 | Q |
| 3 | 5 | Falilat Ogunkoya | Nigeria | 23.18 | Q |
| 4 | 1 | Gwen Torrence | United States | 23.54 | Q |
| 5 | 6 | Yelena Vinogradova | Soviet Union | 23.73 | Q |
| 6 | 6 | Vivienne Spence | Jamaica | 23.88 | Q |
| 7 | 1 | Ethlyn Tate | Jamaica | 23.97 | Q |
| 8 | 3 | Kornelija Šinković | Yugoslavia | 24.08 | Q |
| 9 | 4 | Magali Seguin | France | 24.09 | Q |
| 10 | 2 | Marisa Masullo | Italy | 24.14 | Q |
| 11 | 6 | Susana Armenteros | Cuba | 24.17 | q |
| 12 | 4 | Rita Angotzi | Italy | 24.21 | Q |
| 13 | 2 | Michelle Walsh | Ireland | 24.53 | Q |
| 13 | 3 | Orit Kolodny | Israel | 24.53 | Q |
| 15 | 5 | Sue Alton | Australia | 24.56 | Q |
| 16 | 1 | Esther Lahoz | Spain | 24.61 | Q |
| 17 | 2 | Geraldine Shitandayi | Kenya | 24.65 | Q |
| 18 | 2 | Idania Pino | Cuba | 24.72 | q |
| 18 | 5 | Duška Suzić | Yugoslavia | 24.72 | q |
| 20 | 1 | Nicole Azar | Australia | 24.84 | q |
| 21 | 4 | Yvette Bonapart | Suriname | 25.15 | Q |
| 22 | 3 | Latifa Lahcen | Morocco | 25.43 | Q |
| 23 | 2 | Carmen Cartagena | Peru | 25.65 | q |
| 24 | 4 | Felicité Bada | Benin | 25.92 | q |
| 25 | 1 | Noshaba Khan | Pakistan | 25.97 | |
| 26 | 2 | Moré Galetovic | Bolivia | 26.16 | |
| 27 | 5 | Aminata Konate | Guinea | 26.31 | |
| 28 | 6 | Lea Haba | Guinea | 26.53 | |
| 29 | 1 | Chung Lai Lai | Hong Kong | 26.77 | |
| 30 | 1 | May Sardouk | Lebanon | 27.12 | |
| 31 | 5 | Adama Perkissam | Chad | 27.20 | |

=== Semifinals ===
Held on 17 July

Wind:
Heat 1: ? m/s, Heat 2: +1.0 m/s, Heat 3: +1.8 m/s

| Rank | Heat | Athlete | Nationality | Time | Notes |
|---|---|---|---|---|---|
| 1 | 3 | Dannette Young | United States | 22.79 | Q |
| 2 | 1 | Gwen Torrence | United States | 22.84 | Q |
| 3 | 2 | Yelena Vinogradova | Soviet Union | 22.97 | Q |
| 4 | 1 | Mary Onyali | Nigeria | 23.12 | Q |
| 5 | 2 | Falilat Ogunkoya | Nigeria | 23.16 | Q |
| 6 | 1 | Ethlyn Tate | Jamaica | 23.46 | q |
| 6 | 2 | Magali Seguin | France | 23.46 | q |
| 8 | 3 | Kornelija Šinković | Yugoslavia | 23.49 | Q |
| 9 | 2 | Marisa Masullo | Italy | 23.60 | |
| 10 | 3 | Vivienne Spence | Jamaica | 23.61 | |
| 11 | 1 | Susana Armenteros | Cuba | 23.76 | |
| 12 | 3 | Rita Angotzi | Italy | 24.09 | |
| 13 | 3 | Sue Alton | Australia | 24.13 | |
| 14 | 2 | Orit Kolodny | Israel | 24.25 | |
| 15 | 2 | Michelle Walsh | Ireland | 24.43 | |
| 16 | 1 | Duška Suzić | Yugoslavia | 24.62 | |
| 17 | 1 | Esther Lahoz | Spain | 24.63 | |
| 18 | 1 | Geraldine Shitandayi | Kenya | 24.65 | |
| 19 | 3 | Yvette Bonapart | Suriname | 24.72 | |
| 20 | 2 | Nicole Azar | Australia | 24.73 | |
| 21 | 1 | Latifa Lahcen | Morocco | 25.38 | |
| 22 | 3 | Felicité Bada | Benin | 25.52 | |
| 23 | 3 | Carmen Cartagena | Peru | 25.81 | |
| | 2 | Idania Pino | Cuba | ? | |

=== Final ===
Held on 17 July

Wind: +1.5 m/s

| Rank | Athlete | Nationality | Time | Notes |
|---|---|---|---|---|
| 1st place, gold medalist(s) | Gwen Torrence | United States | 22.44 | |
| 2nd place, silver medalist(s) | Mary Onyali | Nigeria | 22.64 | |
| 3rd place, bronze medalist(s) | Dannette Young | United States | 22.72 | |
| 4 | Falilat Ogunkoya | Nigeria | 22.99 | |
| 5 | Yelena Vinogradova | Soviet Union | 23.15 | |
| 6 | Ethlyn Tate | Jamaica | 23.25 | |
| 7 | Magali Seguin | France | 23.30 | |
| 8 | Kornelija Šinković | Yugoslavia | 23.52 | |
