= Nikolay Chernetskiy =

Soviet sprinter (born 1959)

Personal information
- Born: 29 November 1959 (age 66) Frunze, Kirghiz SSR, Soviet Union
Medal record
Men's athletics
Representing the Soviet Union
Olympic Games
Gold medal – first place	1980 Moscow	4×400 m
World Championships
Gold medal – first place	1983 Helsinki	4×400 m
European Indoor Championships
Gold medal – first place	1980 Sindelfingen	400 m
Bronze medal – third place	1978 Milan	400 m

Nikolay Nikolayevich Chernetskiy (Russian: Николай Николаевич Чернецкий; born 29 November 1959 in Frunze, Kirghiz SSR) is a retired track and field sprinter from the Soviet Union.

He is known for winning the gold medal in the men's 4 × 400 metres relay at the 1980 Summer Olympics and at the inaugural 1983 World Championships (with Aleksandr Troshchilo, Sergey Lovachov, and Viktor Markin, clocking a total time of 3:00.79 min).
