= Nicoleta Lia =

Romanian sprinter

Personal information
- Nationality: Romanian
- Born: 12 December 1963 (age 61)

Sport
- Sport: Sprinting
- Event: 200 metres

Nicoleta Lia (born 12 December 1963) is a Romanian sprinter. She competed in the women's 200 metres at the 1980 Summer Olympics.
