= 1982 European Athletics Indoor Championships – Men's 400 metres =

The men's 400 metres event at the 1982 European Athletics Indoor Championships was held on 6 and 7 March.

== Medalists ==
Gold	Silver	Bronze
Pavel Konovalov; Soviet Union	Sándor Újhelyi; Hungary	Benjamín González; Spain

== Results ==
=== Heats ===
The winner of each heat (Q) and the next 2 fastest (q) qualified for the final.

Rank	Heat	Name	Nationality	Time	Notes
1	2	Pavel Konovalov	Soviet Union	46.87	Q, PB
2	2	Sándor Újhelyi	Hungary	46.91	q
3	2	Benjamín González	Spain	47.43	q, NR
4	2	Roberto Ribaud	Italy	47.44	
5	1	Željko Knapić	Yugoslavia	47.51	Q
6	1	Alim Safarov	Soviet Union	47.51	
7	1	Toma Tomov	Bulgaria	47.89	

=== Final ===
Rank	Name	Nationality	Time	Notes
1st place, gold medalist(s)	Pavel Konovalov	Soviet Union	47.04	
2nd place, silver medalist(s)	Sándor Újhelyi	Hungary	47.14	
3rd place, bronze medalist(s)	Benjamín González	Spain	47.41	NR
4	Željko Knapić	Yugoslavia	47.46	
