= Kerstin Walther =

East German sprinter

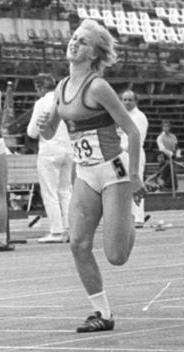

Personal information
- Born: 15 April 1961 (age 65) Altenburg, Thuringia, East Germany

Sport
- Sport: Track and field
Medal record
Representing East Germany
World Championships
Gold medal – first place	1983 Helsinki	4 × 400 m relay

Kerstin Walther (born 15 April 1961) is a retired East German sprinter.

She won both the 100 metres, the 200 metres and the 4 × 100 metres relay at the 1979 European Athletics Junior Championships. At the 1983 World Championships she won a gold medal in the 4 × 400 metres relay.

Walther represented the sports club SC DHfK Leipzig, and won a silver medal at the East German championships in 1983 (400 metres). Her personal best times were 11.34 in the 100 metres, achieved in May 1982 in Jena, 22.34 in the 200 metres, achieved in June 1984 in Erfurt and 51.12 in the 400 metres, achieved in May 1983 in Jena.

Walther is 1.75 metres tall; during her active career she weighed 65 kg.
