= Eric Josjö =

Swedish sprinter (born 1961)

Bo Eric Michael Josjö (born 30 August 1961) is a Swedish former sprinter. He was an eight-time Swedish champion and held the Swedish record for the men's 400 metres from 1981 to 2001. He represented Sweden at the 1983 World Championships in Athletics and the 1984 Summer Olympics.

== Biography ==
As a child, Josjö played football and dabbled in athletics as a middle-distance runner. He switched to sprinting as a 15-year-old after his athletics club, Turebergs IF, called him to run 400 metres in a club dual meet and he did well despite an almost complete lack of training; realizing his potential, he started training seriously under coach Jan "Bobby" Strandberg and developed rapidly. Josjö won his first national championship title at 400 metres in 1980 as an 18-year-old.

In 1981 Josjö was Swedish champion over 200 metres (21.09) and won the DN-Galan 400 metres in 45.63, defeating a strong international field. The time was a new Swedish record; Josjö never improved it again, and it lasted until Jimisola Laursen ran 45.54 twenty years later. Josjö was selected to represent Europe at the 1981 IAAF World Cup in Rome in the 4 × 400 metres relay; the European team of Josjö, Fons Brijdenbach, Koen Gijsbers and Hartmut Weber placed second behind the United States.

In 1982, Josjö was Swedish champion at both 200 and 400 metres. At the 1982 European Championships in Athens he represented Sweden in both the individual 400 metres and the 4 × 400 metres relay; in the individual event he was eliminated in the heats, while the Swedish relay team qualified for the final and placed eighth. Josjö was an All-American sprinter for the SMU Mustangs track and field team, finishing 4th in the 4 × 400 m relay at the 1983 NCAA Division I Outdoor Track and Field Championships.

Josjö also competed in both the individual 400 m and relay at the inaugural 1983 World Championships in Helsinki; his best race there was in the relay heats, where he split an estimated 45.79 on the second leg as Sweden qualified for the final. In the individual 400 metres Josjö faded in the final straight in both of his races and went out in the quarterfinals.

At the 1984 Summer Olympics in Los Angeles Josjö competed only in the relay; Sweden qualified from the heats on time, but was eliminated in the semi-finals. Josjö regained his Swedish titles at both 200 and 400 metres in 1985; in total, he was Swedish champion four times at 200 metres (1981, 1982, 1985 and 1988) and four times at 400 metres (1980, 1982, 1983 and 1985). The final years of his athletic career were marked by Achilles tendon problems, leading to his retirement from athletics in 1989. After 1989 Josjö concentrated on his new career as a photographer and did not remain involved in sports.

In 2016, Josjö began exhibiting work through the Art of the Olympians
