= 1989 European Athletics Indoor Championships – Women's 400 metres =

The women's 400 metres event at the 1989 European Athletics Indoor Championships was held on 18 and 19 February.

== Medalists ==
Gold	Silver	Bronze
Sally Gunnell; Great Britain	Marina Shmonina; Soviet Union	Anita Protti; Switzerland

== Results ==
=== Heats ===
First 2 from each heat (Q) and the next 2 fastest (q) qualified for the final.

Rank	Heat	Name	Nationality	Time	Notes
1	2	Sally Gunnell	Great Britain	52.90	Q
2	2	Anita Protti	Switzerland	52.96	Q
3	2	Marina Shmonina	Soviet Union	52.98	q
4	1	Taťána Slaninová	Czechoslovakia	53.79	Q
5	1	Angela Piggford	Great Britain	53.88	Q
6	1	Fabienne Ficher	France	54.63	q
7	2	Esther Lahoz	Spain	54.67	

=== Final ===
Rank	Name	Nationality	Time	Notes
1st place, gold medalist(s)	Sally Gunnell	Great Britain	52.04	
2nd place, silver medalist(s)	Marina Shmonina	Soviet Union	52.36	
3rd place, bronze medalist(s)	Anita Protti	Switzerland	52.57	
4	Angela Piggford	Great Britain	52.90	
5	Taťána Slaninová	Czechoslovakia	54.16	
6	Fabienne Ficher	France	54.67	
