= Galina Penkova =

Bulgarian sprinter

Personal information
- Born: 18 May 1958 (age 68) Veliko Tarnovo, Bulgaria

Sport
- Sport: Track and field

Galina Penkova, née Yencheva (Bulgarian: Галина Енчева Пенкова; born 18 May 1958) is a retired Bulgarian sprinter who specialized in the 400 metres.

She finished eighth in the 4 × 400 metres relay at the 1983 World Championships, with teammates Svobodka Damyanova, Rositsa Stamenova and Katya Ilieva.

Her personal best time was 51.66 seconds, achieved in July 1983 in Sofia.
