= Andreas Horn =

German neuroscientist

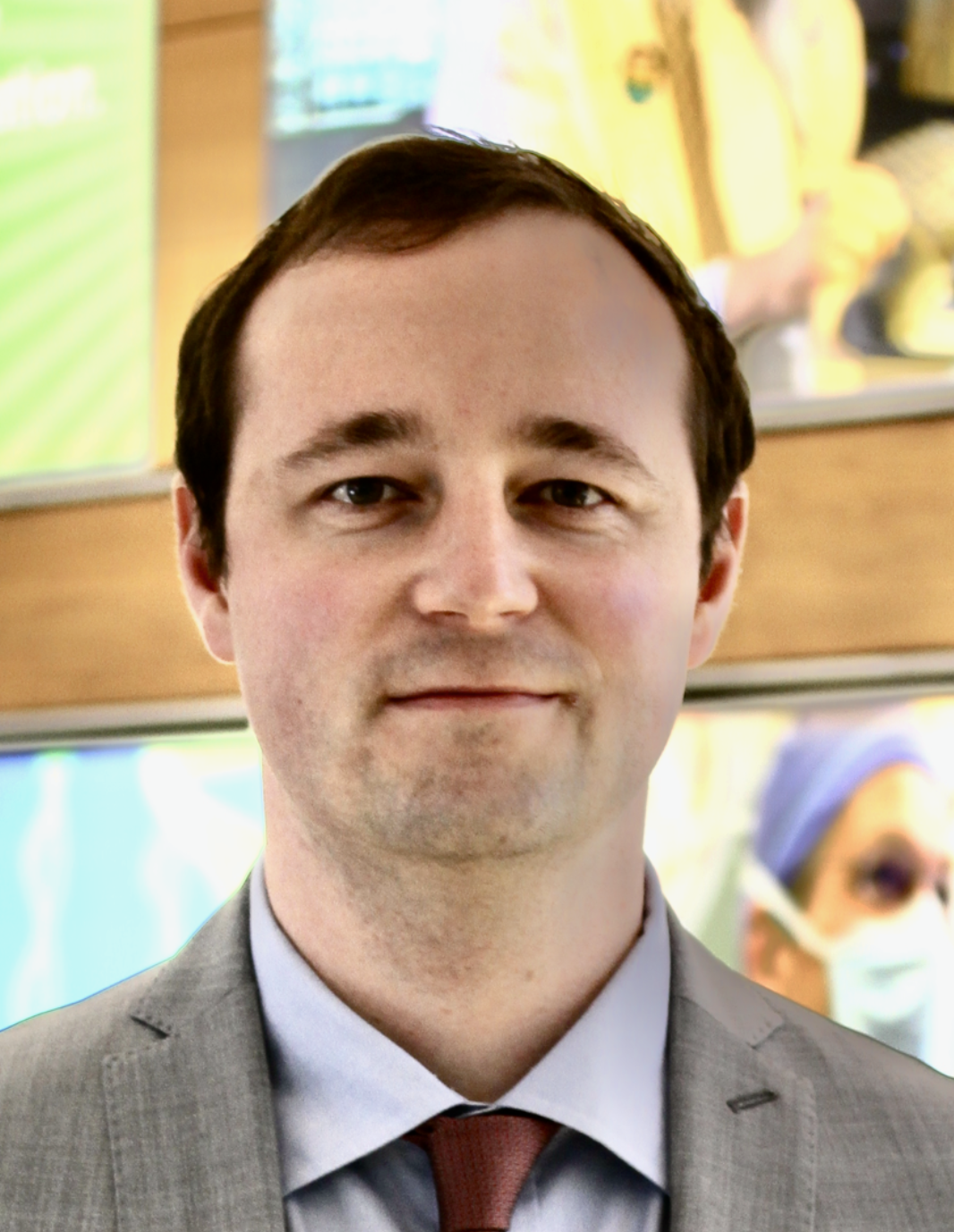
- Born: Freiburg, Germany
- Education: University of Freiburg
- Known for: Deep Brain Stimulation, functional neuroimaging
- Awards: German Research Foundation Heinz Maier-Leibnitz-Preis, Clarivate Highly Cited Researchers
- Scientific career
- Fields: Neuroimaging neurology
- Workplaces: Harvard Medical School, Brigham & Women's Hospital, Massachusetts General Hospital

Andreas Horn is a German neuroscientist and Schilling Professor for Computational Neurology at the University of Cologne. Between 2016 and 2025, he worked at multiple hospitals within the Harvard system where he rose to Associate Professor of Neurology at Harvard Medical School and Mass General Brigham in 2022. His research has focused on mapping deep brain stimulation outcomes onto networks of the human brain.

== Education and career ==
Horn studied medicine at University of Freiburg and received his MD in 2012. He then pursued a PhD in Medical Neurosciences at Charité Berlin which he completed in 2016. After working in several postdoctoral roles, he was enrolled into the Emmy Noether Program by the German Research Foundation and started a laboratory at Charité in 2018. In 2022, he became Associate Professor of Neurology at Harvard Medical School and affiliated with Brigham and Women's and Massachusetts General Hospital. In 2025, he founded the Network Stimulation Institute at the University of Cologne.

== Research contributions ==
Horn is known for his work in brain circuit mapping and neuromodulation. He developed methods to localize deep brain stimulation electrodes and to estimate networks stimulated by them. His research has also explored how brain stimulation sites and lesions correlate with specific brain circuits, providing insights into various neurological and psychiatric conditions such as Parkinson's disease, obsessive-compulsive-disorder, Alzheimer's Disease, and dystonia. He and his team developed methods such as Lead-DBS and subcortical electrophysiology mapping and DBS network mapping. Horn's work has been featured by media outlets such as CNN, Newsweek or Fox News.

== Selected honors and awards ==
- Clarivate Highly Cited Researcher (2024): Recognized among highly cited researchers worldwide.
- Stanford's 'World's Top 2% Scientists' (2022, 2023, 2024): Awarded by Stanford University / Elsevier to the top 2% of researchers worldwide.
- German Research Foundation: Heinz Maier-Leibnitz-Preis
- International Brain Stimulation Early Career Award (2025): Awarded by Elsevier for contributions to brain stimulation research.
- Global Call Winner 2024, Life Sciences Category, Falling Walls Foundation.

== Selected publications ==
- Hollunder B, Ostrem JL, Sahin IA, Rajamani N, Oxenford S, Butenko K, Neudorfer C, Reinhardt P, Zvarova P, Polosan M, Akram H, Vissani M, Zhang C, Sun B, Navratil P, Reich MM, Volkmann J, Yeh FC, Baldermann JC, Dembek TA, Visser-Vandewalle V, Alho EJL, Franceschini PR, Nanda P, Finke C, Kühn AA, Dougherty DD, Richardson RM, Bergman H, DeLong MR, Mazzoni A, Romito LM, Tyagi H, Zrinzo L, Joyce EM, Chabardes S, Starr PA, Li N, Horn A. Mapping dysfunctional circuits in the frontal cortex using deep brain stimulation. Nat Neurosci. 2024;27(3):573-586.
- Ríos AS, Oxenford S, Neudorfer C, Butenko K, Li N, Rajamani N, Boutet A, Elias GJB, Germann J, Loh A, Deeb W, Wang F, Setsompop K, Salvato B, Almeida LB de, Foote KD, Amaral R, Rosenberg PB, Tang-Wai DF, Wolk DA, Burke AD, Salloway S, Sabbagh MN, Chakravarty MM, Smith GS, Lyketsos CG, Okun MS, Anderson WS, Mari Z, Ponce FA, Lozano AM, Horn A. Optimal deep brain stimulation sites and networks for stimulation of the fornix in Alzheimer's disease. Nat Commun. 2022;13(1):7707.
- Rajamani N, Friedrich H, Butenko K, Dembek T, Lange F, Navrátil P, Zvarova P, Hollunder B, De Bie RMA, Odekerken VJJ, Volkmann J, Xu X, Ling Z, Yao C, Ritter P, Neumann WJ, Skandalakis GP, Komaitis S, Kalyvas A, Koutsarnakis C, Stranjalis G, Barbe M, Milanese V, Fox MD, Kühn AA, Middlebrooks E, Li N, Reich M, Neudorfer C, Horn A. Deep brain stimulation of symptom-specific networks in Parkinson's disease. Nat Commun. 2024;15(1):4662.
- Horn A, Reich M, Vorwerk J, Li N, Wenzel G, Fang Q, Schmitz-Hübsch T, Nickl R, Kupsch A, Volkmann J, Kühn AA, Fox MD. Connectivity Predicts deep brain stimulation outcome in Parkinson disease: DBS Outcome in PD. Ann Neurol. 2017;82(1):67-78.

== See also ==
- Lead-DBS
- Deep Brain Stimulation
- Dysfunctome
