= Silva Oja =

Estonian athletics competitor

Silva Oja (since 1986, Silvia Rahnel; born 17 January 1961) is an Estonian athletics competitor.

She was born in Pärnu. In 1984 she graduated from Tallinn Pedagogical Institute's Faculty of Physical Education.

She began athletics training in 1968, coached by Linda Rannap. Since 1979 her coach was Hans Torim. In 1979 she won silver medal at European Athletics Junior Championships in hurdles and in pentathlon. She is multiple-times Estonian champion in different athletics disciplines.

1991–2005 she was one of the organizers of television program "TV 10 olümpiastarti". 1995–1997 she was a member of Estonian Olympic Committee women's commission.

Personal best:

- 100 m: 12,0 (1982)
- 200 m: 24,8 (1983)
- shot put: 15.24 (1984)
- javelin: 48.52 (1982)
