= Katya Ilieva =

Bulgarian sprinter

Katya Ilieva (Bulgarian: Катя Илиева) (born 3 January 1963) is a retired Bulgarian sprinter who specialized in the 400 metres.

She finished eighth in the 4 × 400 metres relay at the 1983 World Championships, with teammates Svobodka Damyanova, Rositsa Stamenova and Galina Penkova.

Her personal best time was 51.11 seconds, achieved in August 1987 in Sofia.
