= Sergey Lovachov =

Uzbekistani sprinter

Personal information
- Born: May 18, 1959 (age 67)
Medal record
Men's Athletics
Representing the Soviet Union
World Championships
Gold medal – first place	1983 Helsinki	4 × 400 m relay

Sergey Lovachov (born May 18, 1959) is a retired track and field sprinter from Uzbekistan, known for winning the gold medal for the Soviet Union in the men's 4 × 400 metres relay at the inaugural 1983 World Championships. He did so alongside Aleksandr Troshchilo, Nikolay Chernetskiy, and Viktor Markin, clocking a total time of 3:00.79. He set his personal best (45.37) in the 400 metres on 1984-06-22 at a meet in Kiev.
