= Marina Ivanova-Kharlamova =

Soviet sprinter

Medal record

Women's athletics

Representing the Soviet Union

World Championships
| Bronze medal – third place | 1983 Helsinki | 4 × 400 m relay |

Marina Ivanova-Kharlamova (Russian: Марина Иванова-Харламова; born 24 May 1962) is a Russian former Soviet track and field sprinter. She set 400 metres personal bests of 50.63 seconds outdoors and 52.23 seconds indoors. She was the national champion at the Soviet Indoor Athletics Championships in 1989.

She won bronze medals with the Soviet Union women's 4 × 400 metres relay team at the 1983 World Championships in Athletics (with Yelena Korban, Irina Baskakova and Mariya Pinigina) and at the 1979 European Athletics Junior Championships (with Lyubov Kiryukhina, Aldona Mendzoryte and Liliya Tuznikova).

== International competitions ==
| Year | Competition | Venue | Position | Event | Notes |
|---|---|---|---|---|---|
| 1979 | European Junior Championships | Bydgoszcz, Poland | 4th | 400 m | 52.29 |
| 1979 | European Junior Championships | Bydgoszcz, Poland | 3rd | 4 × 400 m relay | 3:35.47 |
| 1983 | World Championships | Helsinki, Finland | 3rd | 4 × 400 m relay | 3:21.16 |
| 1989 | World Indoor Championships | Budapest, Hungary | 4th (semis) | 400 m | 52.23 |

== National titles ==
- Soviet Indoor Athletics Championships
  - 400 m: 1989

== See also ==
- List of World Championships in Athletics medalists (women)
