= Pavel Konovalov (sprinter) =

Soviet sprinter

Personal information
- Born: 13 November 1960 (age 65) Rostov Oblast, Soviet Union
- Height: 1.83 m (6 ft 0 in)
- Weight: 85 kg (187 lb)

Sport
- Sport: Athletics
- Event: 400 metres
- Coached by: W.D. Sysoev; Georgiy Chevichalov
Medal record
Men's athletics
Representing Soviet Union
European Championships
| Bronze medal – third place | 1982 Athens | 4×400 m |
European Indoor Championships
| Gold medal – first place | 1982 Milan | 400 m |

Pavel Trofimovich Konovalov (Russian: Павел Трофимович Коновалов; born 13 November 1960) is a retired Soviet sprinter who specialised in the 400 metres. Individually, his biggest achievement is a gold medal at the 1982 European Indoor Championships. In addition, he won a bronze medal in the 4 × 400 metres relay at the 1982 European Championships and silver at the 1979 European Junior Championships.

His personal bests in the event are 45.84 seconds outdoors (Athens 1982) and 46.87 seconds indoors (Milan 1982).

== International competitions ==
| Year | Competition | Venue | Position | Event | Notes |
Representing the Soviet Union
| 1979 | European Junior Championships | Bydgoszcz, Poland | 6th | 400 m | 46.89 |
| 1979 | European Junior Championships | Bydgoszcz, Poland | 2nd | 4 × 400 m relay | 3:06.76 |
| 1982 | European Indoor Championships | Milan, Italy | 1st | 400 m | 47.04 |
| 1982 | European Championships | Athens, Greece | 6th | 400 m | 45.84 |
| 1982 | European Championships | Athens, Greece | 3rd | 4 × 400 m relay | 3:00.80 |
