= Jan Pawłowicz =

Polish sprinter (born 1960)

Personal information
- Nationality: Polish
- Born: 9 July 1960 (age 66)

Sport
- Sport: Sprinting
- Event: 4 × 400 metres relay

Jan Pawłowicz (born 9 July 1960) is a Polish sprinter. He competed in the men's 4 × 400 metres relay at the 1980 Summer Olympics.
