= Françoise Damado =

Senegalese sprinter

Personal information
- Nationality: Senegalese
- Born: 11 December 1963 (age 62)

Sport
- Sport: Sprinting
- Event: 100 metres
Medal record
Women's athletics
Representing Senegal
African Championships
Bronze medal – third place	1979 Dakar	4×100 m
Bronze medal – third place	1982 Cairo	4×100 m

Françoise Odette Damado (born 11 December 1963) is a Senegalese former sprinter. She competed in the women's 100 metres at the 1980 Summer Olympics.
