= Oddur Sigurðsson =

Icelandic sprinter

Personal information
- Nationality: Icelandic
- Born: 28 April 1959 (age 67) Reykjavík, Iceland
- Height: 181 cm (5 ft 11 in)
- Weight: 70 kg (154 lb)

Sport
- Sport: Sprinting
- Events: 100 metres, 400 metres

Oddur Sigurðsson (born 28 April 1959) is an Icelandic sprinter. He competed in the 400 metres at the 1980 Summer Olympics and the 1984 Summer Olympics. He raced in heat 7 and came 7th out of 7 runners with a time of 10.94 seconds. He did not advance to the next round.

Sigurðsson was an All-American sprinter for the Texas Longhorns men's track and field team, finishing 5th in the 4 × 400 m relay at the 1982 NCAA Division I Indoor Track and Field Championships and 1983 NCAA Division I Outdoor Track and Field Championships.
