= Fatalmoudou Touré =

Malian middle-distance runner

Personal information
- Nationality: Malian
- Born: 1963 (age 62–63)

Sport
- Sport: Middle-distance running
- Event: 800 metres

Fatalmoudou Touré (born 1963) is a Malian middle-distance runner. She competed in the women's 800 metres at the 1980 Summer Olympics. She was the first woman to represent Mali at the Olympics.
