= Karin Verguts =

Belgian sprinter

Personal information
- Nationality: Belgian
- Born: 3 May 1961 (age 64)

Sport
- Sport: Sprinting
- Event: 200 metres

Karin Verguts (born 3 May 1961) is a Belgian sprinter. She competed in the women's 200 metres at the 1980 Summer Olympics.
