= Irina Baskakova =

Soviet sprinter

Personal information
- Born: August 25, 1956 (age 69) Leningrad, Soviet Union
Medal record
Women's Athletics
Representing the Soviet Union
World Championships
| Bronze medal – third place | 1983 Helsinki | 4x400 m relay |
European Championships
| Bronze medal – third place | 1982 Athens | 4x400 m relay |
Summer Universiade
| Gold medal – first place | 1981 Bucharest | 400 m |
| Gold medal – first place | 1981 Bucharest | 4x400 m relay |

Irina Baskakova (born August 25, 1956) is a retired track and field sprinter from the Soviet Union, known for winning the bronze medal in the women's 4x400 metres relay at the 1982 European Championships. She did so alongside Irina Olkhovnikova, Olga Mineyeva and Yelena Didilenko, clocking a total time of 3:22.79.

A year later Baskakova repeated that feat at the inaugural World Championships, this time with Marina Ivanova-Kharlamova, Yelena Korban, and Mariya Kulchunova-Pinigina.
