= Didier Dubois (athlete) =

French sprinter (born 1957)

Didier Dubois (born 22 May 1957 in Malo-les-Bains) is a French former sprinter who competed in the 1980 Summer Olympics and in the 1984 Summer Olympics.
