= Yelena Korban =

Soviet sprinter (born 1961)

Personal information
- Born: April 20, 1961 (age 65)
Medal record
Women's Athletics
Representing the Soviet Union
World Championships
Bronze medal – third place	1983 Helsinki	4x400 m relay
European Championships
Bronze medal – third place	1982 Athens	4x400 m relay
Summer Universiade
Gold medal – first place	1983 Edmonton	4x400 m relay
Gold medal – first place	1985 Kobe	4x400 m relay
Bronze medal – third place	1983 Edmonton	400m

Yelena Korban (née Didilenko; born April 20, 1961) is a retired track and field sprinter from the Soviet Union, known for winning the bronze medal in the women's 4x400 metres relay at the 1982 European Championships. She did so alongside Irina Olkhovnikova, Olga Mineyeva and Irina Baskakova, clocking a total time of 3:22.79.

A year later Korban repeated that feat at the inaugural World Championships, this time with Marina Ivanova-Kharlamova, Irina Baskakova, and Mariya Kulchunova-Pinigina.
