= Aliaksandr Trashchyla =

Soviet sprinter (born 1960)

Aleksandr Troshchilo
Personal information
- Born: January 16, 1960 (age 66) Minsk, Belarusian SSR, Soviet Union
Medal record
Men's athletics
Representing the Soviet Union
World Championships
Gold medal – first place	1983 Helsinki	4×400 m relay
European Championships
Bronze medal – third place	1982 Athens	4×400 m relay
Summer Universiade
Silver medal – second place	1983 Edmonton	4x400 m relay

Aleksandr Troshchilo (Belarusian: Аляксандар Трашчыла; born January 16, 1960) is a retired track and field sprinter from the Soviet Union, known for winning the bronze medal in the men's 4 × 400 metres relay at the 1982 European Championships. A year later he triumphed in the same event at the inaugural 1983 World Championships alongside Sergey Lovachov, Nikolay Chernetskiy, and Viktor Markin, clocking a total time of 3:00.79.
