= Benjamín González Gómez =

Spanish middle-distance runner

Personal information
- Born: 12 April 1958 Madrid, Spain
- Died: 4 June 2011 (aged 53) Abadiño, Spain

Sport
- Sport: Track and field
Medal record
Representing Spain
World Indoor Championships
Silver medal – second place	1985 Paris	800 m
Mediterranean Games
Bronze medal – third place	1983 Casablanca	4x400m relay
European Indoor Championships
Bronze medal – third place	1982 Milan	400 m

Benjamín González Gómez (12 April 1958 – 4 June 2011) was an athlete from Spain. He competed in the 400 and 800 metres.

González won a bronze medal in 400 m at the 1982 European Indoor Championships. At the inaugural World Indoor Games in 1985 he and finished second in the 800 metres behind compatriot Colomán Trabado. On the national level, he became Spanish 400 metres champion in 1980, 1981 and 1982.

González's personal best 800 m time was 1:46.53 minutes, achieved in June 1985 in Madrid.

== Olympic Games ==
Benjamín participated in the 1980 Moscow Olympic Games in the 4x400 metres relay category.

In 1984, he qualified for the Los Angeles Olympics. He took part in the 4x400 metres relay and 800 metres events.
