= Kerstin Brandt =

German high jumper

Kerstin Brandt, née Dedner (born 9 December 1961 in Wismar, Bezirk Rostock) is a retired East German high jumper.

She won the 1979 European Junior Championships, finished fourth at the 1982 European Indoor Championships and fifth at the inaugural 1983 World Championships. She represented the sports club SC Empor Rostock, and won bronze medals at the East German championships in 1979, 1987 and 1988.

Her personal best jump was 1.99 metres, achieved in August 1983 in London.
