= Undine Bremer =

East German sprinter

Medal record

Women's athletics

Representing East Germany

World Championships
Gold medal – first place	1983 Helsinki	4 × 400 m relay

Undine Bremer, née Hartmann (born 30 June 1961, in Magdeburg) is a retired East German sprinter who competed mainly in the 400 metres.

At the 1983 World Championships she won a gold medal in the 4 × 400 metres relay. Although it was Gesine Walther, Sabine Busch, Marita Koch and Dagmar Rübsam who ran in the final, Bremer had run in the qualifying round.

Bremer represented the sports club SC Magdeburg. Her personal best times were 11.35 in the 100 metres, achieved in May 1982 in Jena, 23.06 in the 200 metres, achieved in May 1982 in Erfurt and 51.40 in the 400 metres, achieved in May 1983 in Jena.

Bremer is 1.68 metres tall; during her active career she weighed 58 kg.
