= Thomas Giessing =

German sprinter

Medal record

Men's athletics

Representing West Germany

European Championships
Gold medal – first place	1982 Athens	4×400 m

Thomas Giessing (born 19 March 1961 in Rhede, North Rhine-Westphalia) is a retired West German sprinter who specialized in the 400 metres.

At the 1982 European Championships he finished eighth in the 400 metres and helped win the 4 × 400 metres relay with teammates Erwin Skamrahl, Harald Schmid and Hartmut Weber. At the 1984 Summer Olympics he ran in the first round for the relay team.
