= Emmy Noether Program =

German support program for early career scientists

The Emmy Noether Program is a program introduced by the German Research Foundation (DFG) in 1997. Its aim as stated by the DFG is to support exceptionally qualified early career scientists. It was named after German mathematician Emmy Noether.

== Program ==
The intent of the program is to give participants the opportunity to lead a junior research group and to satisfy the prerequisites for appointment as a university professor. Further, the DFG states that the program aims to attract foreign talent to Germany and to keep talented German scientists from emigrating.

According to the DFG, potential fellows have to "demonstrate significant achievements and the ability to lead from the early stages of their career on as well as substantial international experience and visibility". The application must describe a concrete research project that the potential fellow aims to conduct with their group. If successful, the duration of the fellowship is six years, in which the fellow is granted a salary as well as all funds necessary to build the group and complete the project. The program aims to offer an alternative to the conventional route to a professorship through habilitation and junior professorships.

== Emmy Noether Meetings ==
Since 2001, the Emmy Noether fellows meet at the so-called Emmy Noether Meetings as a platform for exchange between the fellows as well as workshops and talks on science policy.
