= Hartmut Weber =

German sprinter (born 1960)

Medal record

Men's athletics

Representing West Germany

European Championships
Gold medal – first place	1982 Athens	400 m
Gold medal – first place	1982 Athens	4×400 m

Hartmut Weber (born 17 October 1960 in Kamen) is a retired German track and field athlete who competed in the 400 metres.

At the 1982 European Championships he won the gold medal with a lifetime best of 44.72 seconds. He also helped win the 4 × 400 metres relay with teammates Erwin Skamrahl, Harald Schmid and Thomas Giessing. At the 1983 World Championships he finished fifth in 400 metres and won a silver medal in the 4 × 400 metres relay with teammates Erwin Skamrahl, Jörg Vaihinger and Harald Schmid.

His personal best time of 44.72 seconds ranks him fifth among German 400 m sprinters, behind Thomas Schönlebe, Erwin Skamrahl, Ingo Schultz and Karl Honz. In addition he ran the 400 metres hurdles in 49.10 seconds in May 1982 in Dortmund. This ranks him ninth among German 400 m hurdlers, behind Harald Schmid, Olaf Hense, Edgar Itt, Uwe Ackermann, Thomas Goller, Volker Beck, Carsten Köhrbrück and Gerhard Hennige.
