= Edgar Nakladal =

German sprinter (born 1961)

Personal information
- Born: July 6, 1961 (age 64)

Achievements and titles
- National finals: 1983 West German Champs; • 400 m, 4th
Medal record
Men's athletics
Representing West Germany
IAAF World Championships in Athletics
Silver medal – second place	1983 Helsinki	4 × 400 m

Edgar Nakladal (born 6 July 1961) was a professional sprinter representing West Germany. At the inaugural IAAF World Championships in Athletics in 1983, he won the silver medal in the 4 × 400 m by virtue of running for his team in the preliminary rounds. Though he didn't run in the final at Worlds, he did run in the final and win the 4 × 400 m at the 1982 European Championships in Athletics and the 1979 European Junior Championships in Athletics.

His personal best in the 400 m was 45.97 seconds, which he set in Bremen, Germany on June 24, 1983. At the 1983 Worlds, he became one of the first athletes ever to be substituted out of a final and still receive a medal.

== Major international competitions ==
Year	Competition	Venue	Position	Event	Notes
1982	European Athletics Championships	Athina, Greece	6th (Heat 3, Heats)	400 m	47.30
