= Rositsa Stamenova =

Bulgarian sprinter

Rositsa Stamenova (Bulgarian: Росица Стаменова, born 6 March 1955) is a retired sprinter from Bulgaria. She won two medals at the European Indoor Championships. Her personal best time was 50.82 seconds, achieved in August 1984 in Prague. She also competed in the women's 400 metres at the 1980 Summer Olympics.

== Achievements ==
Year	Competition	Venue	Position	Event	Notes
Representing Bulgaria
1980	European Indoor Championships	Sindelfingen, West Germany	4th	400 m	
1983	European Indoor Championships	Budapest, Hungary	3rd	400 m	
1983	World Championships	Helsinki, Finland	7th	4x400 m relay	
1984	European Indoor Championships	Gothenburg, Sweden	3rd	400 m	
1987	World Indoor Championships	Indianapolis, United States	5th	400 m	
1987	World Championships	Rome, Italy	8th	4x400 m relay	
1988	European Indoor Championships	Budapest, Hungary	6th	400 m	
