= 1983 World Championships in Athletics =

Athletics competition in Helsinki, Finland

1st World Championships in Athletics
- Host city: Helsinki, Finland
- Nations: 153
- Athletes: 1,355
- Events: 41
- Dates: 7–14 August 1983
- Opened by: President Mauno Koivisto
- Main venue: Helsinki Olympic Stadium

The 1st World Championships in Athletics (Finnish: Yleisurheilun maailmanmestaruuskilpailut 1983; Swedish: Världsmästerskapen i friidrott 1983) were run under the auspices of the International Association of Athletics Federations and were held at the Olympic Stadium in Helsinki, Finland between 7 and 14 August 1983. Despite the existence of previously held championship events in both 1976 and 1980, this 1983 championship was marked as the inaugural World Championship.

== Summary ==
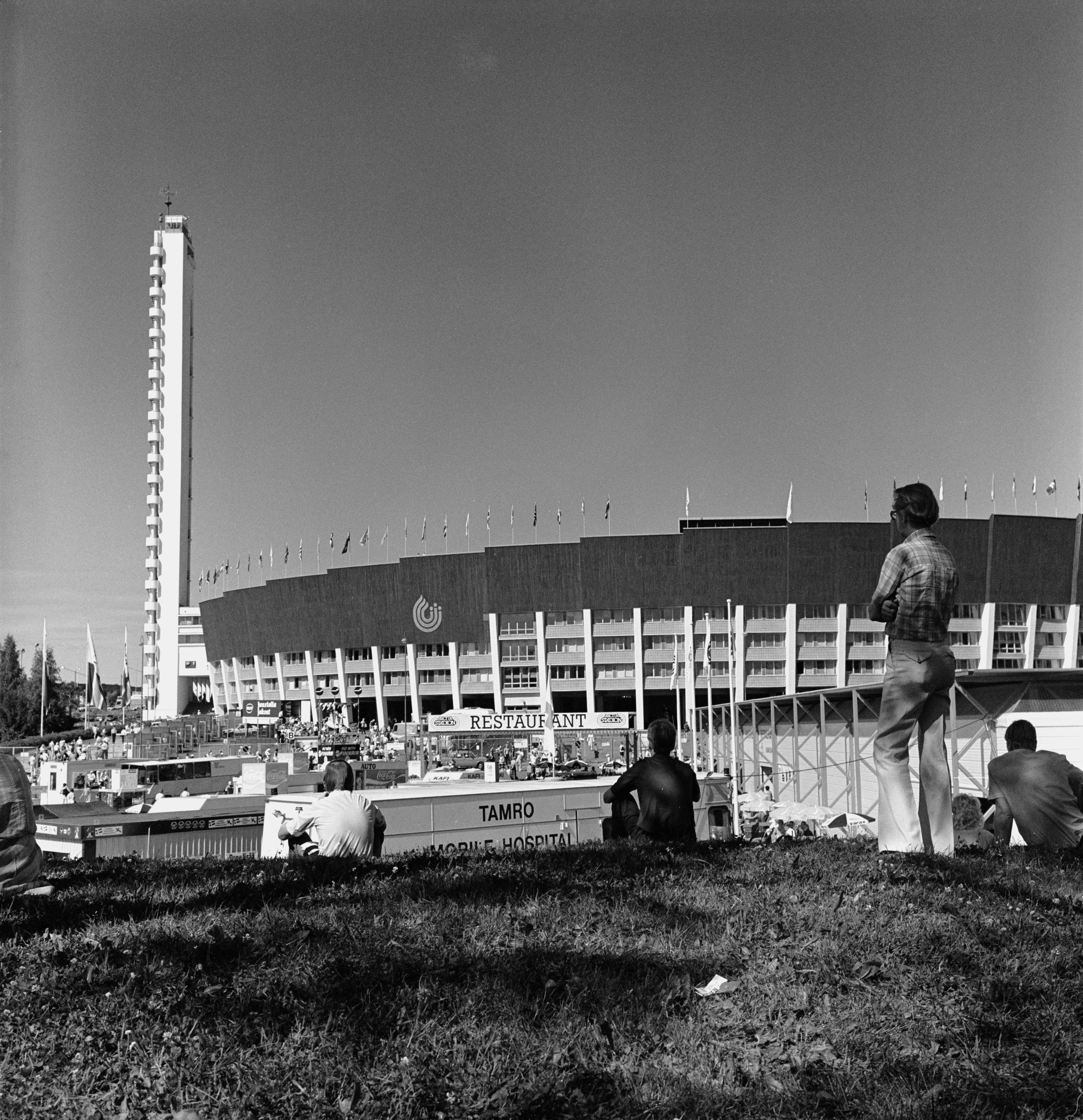
The championships at Helsinki Olympic Stadium, August 1983

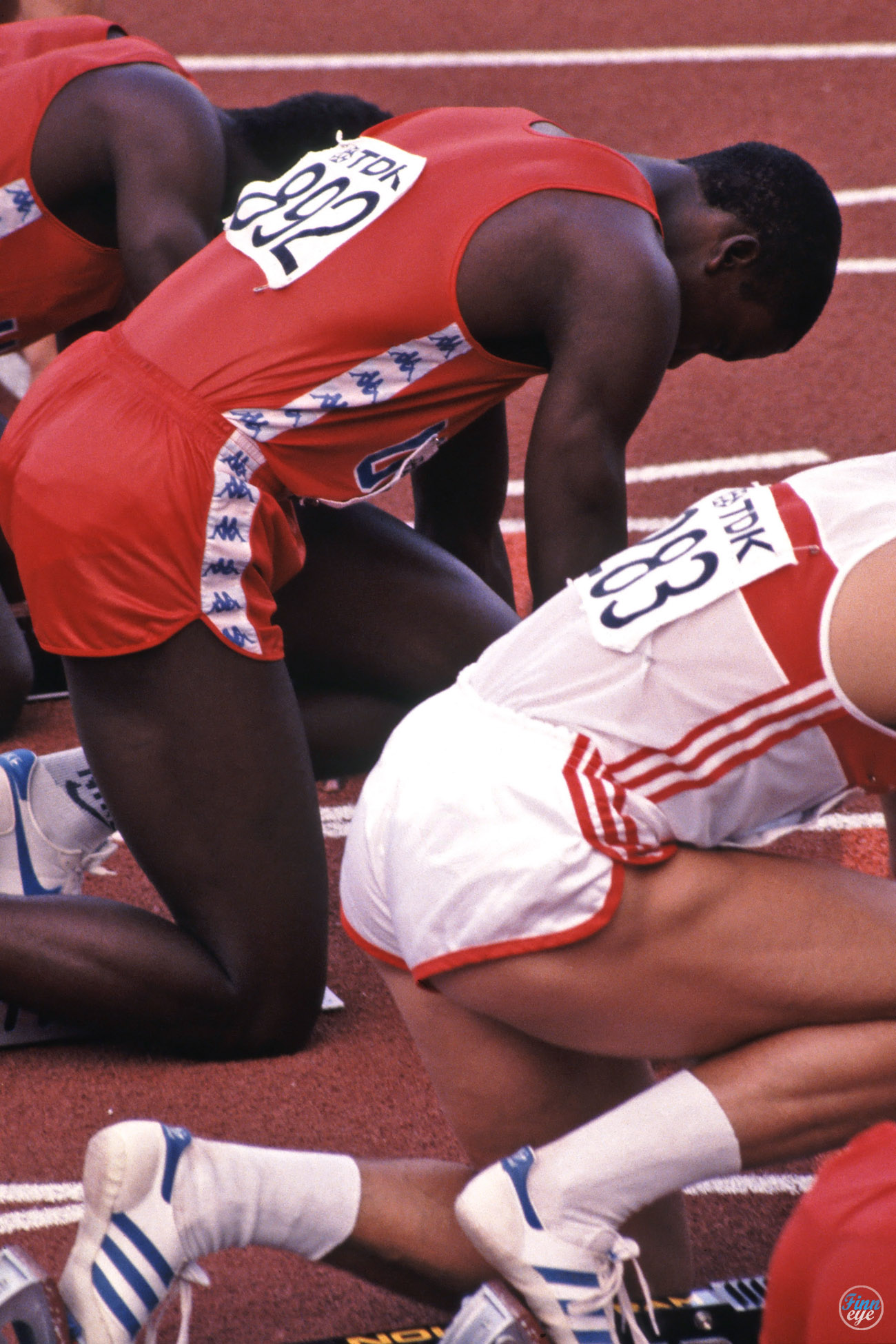
Carl Lewis at the championships

The overall medal table was a closely contested affair. East Germany took the most gold medals (10) over the first championships and finished with a total of 22 medals. The United States had the second number of gold medals, with eight, and also had the greatest overall medal haul, having won 24 medals. The Soviet Union won one more medal than the East Germans and had six golds, although almost half of their podium finishers were bronze medalists. Twenty-five nations reached the medal tally at the inaugural competition, with all six continents being represented. During the early 1980s this was the top venue in which Soviet Bloc athletes competed against American athletes due to the American-led boycott of the 1980 Olympics in Moscow and the retaliatory Soviet Bloc boycott of the 1984 Olympics in Los Angeles.

Carl Lewis won both the 100 metres and the long jump, and finished the competition by anchoring the 4 × 100 metres relay team to a world record time, along with the 200 metres champion Calvin Smith, and bronze medallists Emmit King and Willie Gault. Jarmila Kratochvílová dominated the 400 and 800 metres events, setting a world record of 47.99 seconds. Mary Decker enjoyed her best competition performance, taking the golds in the women's 1500 and 3000 metres. Other prominent athletes included Marita Koch, who won the 200 m and both relay golds, as well as the 100 m silver medal. Sergey Bubka won the first of his six consecutive World Championship gold medals in the pole vault.

== Men's results ==
=== Track ===
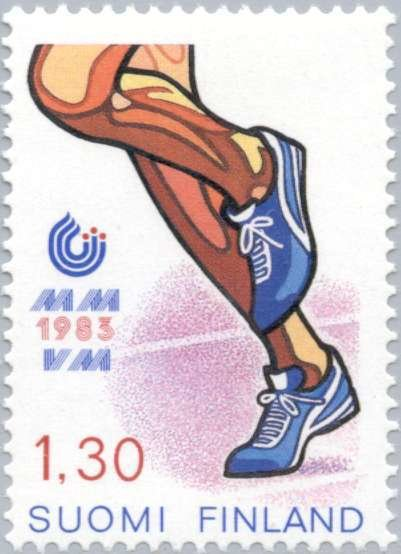
postage stamp from Finland issued in 1983

1983 | 1987 | 1991 | 1993 | 1995

Games	Gold		Silver		Bronze	
100 m	Carl Lewis; United States	10.07	Calvin Smith; United States	10.21	Emmit King; United States	10.24
200 m	Calvin Smith; United States	20.14	Elliott Quow; United States	20.41	Pietro Mennea; Italy	20.51
400 m	Bert Cameron; Jamaica	45.05	Michael Franks; United States	45.22	Sunder Nix; United States	45.24
800 m	Willi Wülbeck; West Germany	1:43.65	Rob Druppers; Netherlands	1:44.20	Joaquim Cruz; Brazil	1:44.27
1500 m	Steve Cram; Great Britain	3:41.59	Steve Scott; United States	3:41.87	Saïd Aouita; Morocco	3:42.02
5000 m	Eamonn Coghlan; Ireland	13:28.53	Werner Schildhauer; East Germany	13:30.20	Martti Vainio; Finland	13:30.34
10,000 m	Alberto Cova; Italy	28:01.04	Werner Schildhauer; East Germany	28:01.18	Hansjörg Kunze; East Germany	28:01.26
Marathon	Rob de Castella; Australia	2:10:03	Kebede Balcha; Ethiopia	2:10:27	Waldemar Cierpinski; East Germany	2:10:37
110 m hurdles	Greg Foster; United States	13.42	Arto Bryggare; Finland	13.46	Willie Gault; United States	13.48
400 m hurdles	Edwin Moses; United States	47.50	Harald Schmid; West Germany	48.61	Aleksandr Kharlov; Soviet Union	49.03
3000 m st.	Patriz Ilg; West Germany	8:15.06	Bogusław Mamiński; Poland	8:17.03	Colin Reitz; Great Britain	8:17.75
20 km walk	Ernesto Canto; Mexico	1:20:49	Jozef Pribilinec; Czechoslovakia	1:20:59	Yevgeniy Yevsyukov; Soviet Union	1:21:08
50 km walk	Ronald Weigel; East Germany	3:43:08	José Marín; Spain	3:46:32	Sergey Yung; Soviet Union	3:49:03
4 × 100 m relay	United States (USA); Emmit King; Willie Gault; Calvin Smith; Carl Lewis	37.86 (WR)	Italy (ITA); Stefano Tilli; Carlo Simionato; Pierfrancesco Pavoni; Pietro Mennea	38.37 (NR)	Soviet Union (URS); Andrey Prokofyev; Nikolay Sidorov; Vladimir Muravyov; Viktor Bryzgin	38.41
4 × 400 m relay	Soviet Union (URS); Sergey Lovachov; Aleksandr Troshchilo; Nikolay Chernetskiy; Viktor Markin	3:00.79	West Germany (FRG); Erwin Skamrahl; Jörg Vaihinger; Harald Schmid; Hartmut Weber; Martin Weppler*; Edgar Nakladal*	3:01.83	Great Britain (GBR); Ainsley Bennett; Garry Cook; Todd Bennett; Phil Brown; Kriss Akabusi*	3:03.53
WR world record | AR area record | CR championship record | GR games record | NR national record | OR Olympic record | PB personal best | SB season best | WL world leading (in a given season)

Note: * Indicates athletes who ran in preliminary rounds.

=== Field ===
1983 | 1987 | 1991 | 1993 | 1995

Games	Gold		Silver		Bronze	
High jump	Hennadiy Avdyeyenko; Soviet Union	2.32	Tyke Peacock; United States	2.32	Zhu Jianhua; China	2.29
Pole vault	Sergey Bubka; Soviet Union	5.70	Konstantin Volkov; Soviet Union	5.60	Atanas Tarev; Bulgaria	5.60
Long jump	Carl Lewis; United States	8.55	Jason Grimes; United States	8.29	Mike Conley; United States	8.12
Triple jump	Zdzisław Hoffmann; Poland	17.42	Willie Banks; United States	17.18	Ajayi Agbebaku; Nigeria	17.18
Shot put	Edward Sarul; Poland	21.39	Ulf Timmermann; East Germany	21.16	Remigius Machura; Czechoslovakia	20.98
Discus throw	Imrich Bugár; Czechoslovakia	67.72	Luis Delís; Cuba	67.36	Géjza Valent; Czechoslovakia	66.08
Hammer throw	Sergey Litvinov; Soviet Union	82.68	Yuriy Sedykh; Soviet Union	80.94	Zdzisław Kwaśny; Poland	79.42
Javelin throw	Detlef Michel; East Germany	89.48	Tom Petranoff; United States	85.60	Dainis Kūla; Soviet Union	85.58
Decathlon	Daley Thompson; Great Britain	8666	Jürgen Hingsen; West Germany	8561	Siegfried Wentz; West Germany	8478
WR world record | AR area record | CR championship record | GR games record | NR national record | OR Olympic record | PB personal best | SB season best | WL world leading (in a given season)

== Women's results ==
=== Track ===
1983 | 1987 | 1991 | 1993 | 1995

Games	Gold		Silver		Bronze	
100 m	Marlies Göhr; East Germany	10.97 (CR)	Marita Koch; East Germany	11.02	Diane Williams; United States	11.06
200 m	Marita Koch; East Germany	22.13	Merlene Ottey; Jamaica	22.19	Kathy Cook; Great Britain	22.37
400 m	Jarmila Kratochvílová; Czechoslovakia	47.99 (WR)	Taťána Kocembová; Czechoslovakia	48.59 (PB)	Mariya Pinigina; Soviet Union	49.19
800 m	Jarmila Kratochvílová; Czechoslovakia	1:54.68	Lyubov Gurina; Soviet Union	1:56.11	Yekaterina Podkopayeva; Soviet Union	1:57.58
1500 m	Mary Decker; United States	4:00.90	Zamira Zaytseva; Soviet Union	4:01.19	Yekaterina Podkopayeva; Soviet Union	4:02.25
3000 m	Mary Decker; United States	8:34.62	Brigitte Kraus; West Germany	8:35.11	Tatyana Kazankina; Soviet Union	8:35.13
Marathon	Grete Waitz; Norway	2:28:09	Marianne Dickerson; United States	2:31:09	Raisa Smekhnova; Soviet Union	2:31:13
100 m hurdles	Bettine Jahn; East Germany	12.35	Kerstin Knabe; East Germany	12.42	Ginka Zagorcheva; Bulgaria	12.62
400 m hurdles	Yekaterina Fesenko; Soviet Union	54.14	Ana Ambrazienė; Soviet Union	54.15	Ellen Fiedler; East Germany	54.55
4 × 100 m relay	East Germany (GDR); Silke Gladisch; Marita Koch; Ingrid Auerswald; Marlies Göhr	41.76	Great Britain (GBR); Joan Baptiste; Kathy Cook; Beverley Callender; Shirley Thomas	42.71	Jamaica (JAM); Leleith Hodges; Jacqueline Pusey; Juliet Cuthbert; Merlene Ottey	42.73
4 × 400 m relay	East Germany (GDR); Kerstin Walther; Sabine Busch; Marita Koch; Dagmar Rübsam; Undine Bremer*; Ellen Fiedler*	3:19.73	Czechoslovakia (TCH); Taťána Kocembová; Milena Matějkovičová; Zuzana Moravčíková; Jarmila Kratochvílová	3:20.32	Soviet Union (URS); Yelena Korban; Marina Ivanova; Irina Baskakova; Mariya Pinigina	3:21.16
WR world record | AR area record | CR championship record | GR games record | NR national record | OR Olympic record | PB personal best | SB season best | WL world leading (in a given season)

Note: * Indicates athletes who ran in preliminary rounds.

=== Field ===
1983 | 1987 | 1991 | 1993 | 1995

Games	Gold		Silver		Bronze	
High jump	Tamara Bykova; Soviet Union	2.01	Ulrike Meyfarth; West Germany	1.99	Louise Ritter; United States	1.95
Long jump	Heike Daute; East Germany	7.27	Anişoara Cuşmir; Romania	7.15	Carol Lewis; United States	7.04
Shot put	Helena Fibingerová; Czechoslovakia	21.05	Helma Knorscheidt; East Germany	20.70	Ilona Slupianek; East Germany	20.56
Discus throw	Martina Opitz; East Germany	68.94	Galina Murasova; Soviet Union	67.44	Mariya Petkova; Bulgaria	66.44
Javelin throw	Tiina Lillak; Finland	70.82	Fatima Whitbread; Great Britain	69.14	Anna Verouli; Greece	65.72
Heptathlon	Ramona Neubert; East Germany	6714	Sabine Paetz; East Germany	6662	Anke Vater; East Germany	6532
WR world record | AR area record | CR championship record | GR games record | NR national record | OR Olympic record | PB personal best | SB season best | WL world leading (in a given season)

== Medal table ==
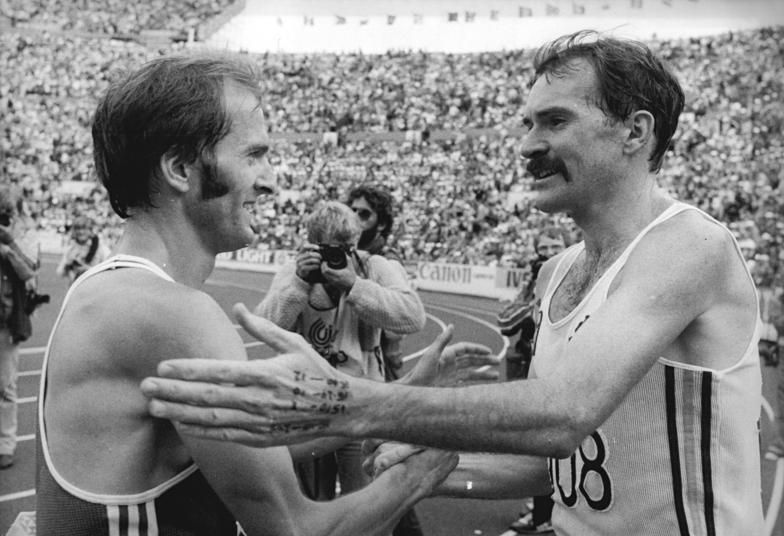
Marathon bronze medallist and reigning Olympic champion Waldemar Cierpinski (DDR) celebrates with gold medal winner Robert de Castella (AUS).

* Host nation (Finland)

Rank	Nation	Gold	Silver	Bronze	Total
1	East Germany (GDR)	10	7	5	22
2	United States (USA)	8	9	7	24
3	Soviet Union (URS)	6	6	11	23
4	Czechoslovakia (TCH)	4	3	2	9
5	West Germany (FRG)	2	5	1	8
6	Great Britain (GBR)	2	2	3	7
7	Poland (POL)	2	1	1	4
8	Finland (FIN)*	1	1	1	3
8	Italy (ITA)	1	1	1	3
8	Jamaica (JAM)	1	1	1	3
11	Australia (AUS)	1	0	0	1
11	Ireland (IRL)	1	0	0	1
11	Mexico (MEX)	1	0	0	1
11	Norway (NOR)	1	0	0	1
15	Cuba (CUB)	0	1	0	1
15	Ethiopia (ETH)	0	1	0	1
15	Netherlands (NED)	0	1	0	1
15	Romania (ROU)	0	1	0	1
15	Spain (ESP)	0	1	0	1
20	Bulgaria (BUL)	0	0	3	3
21	Brazil (BRA)	0	0	1	1
21	China (CHN)	0	0	1	1
21	Greece (GRE)	0	0	1	1
21	Morocco (MAR)	0	0	1	1
21	Nigeria (NGR)	0	0	1	1
Totals (25 entries)		41	41	41	123

== See also ==
- 1983 in athletics (track and field)
