= 1982 European Athletics Championships – Women's 200 metres =

Women's 200 metres at the European Athletics Championships

These are the official results of the Women's 200 metres event at the 1982 European Championships in Athens, Greece, held at Olympic Stadium "Spiros Louis" on 8 and 9 September 1982.

== Medalists ==
Gold	Bärbel Wöckel; East Germany
Silver	Kathy Smallwood; United Kingdom
Bronze	Sabine Günther; East Germany

== Results ==
=== Final ===
9 September Wind: 0.9 m/s

Rank	Name	Nationality	Time	Notes
1st place, gold medalist(s)	Bärbel Wöckel	East Germany	22.04	CR
2nd place, silver medalist(s)	Kathy Smallwood	United Kingdom	22.13	
3rd place, bronze medalist(s)	Sabine Günther	East Germany	22.51	
4	Gesine Walther	East Germany	22.60	
5	Bev Callender	United Kingdom	22.91	
6	Anelia Nuneva	Bulgaria	22.93	
7	Liliane Gaschet	France	22.97	
8	Marie-Christine Cazier	France	23.08	

=== Heats ===
8 September

==== Heat 1 ====
Wind: 0.4 m/s

Rank	Name	Nationality	Time	Notes
1	Bärbel Wöckel	East Germany	22.81	Q
2	Kathy Smallwood	United Kingdom	22.97	Q
3	Liliane Gaschet	France	23.21	Q
4	Anelia Nuneva	Bulgaria	23.35	Q
5	Irina Olkhovnikova	Soviet Union	23.46	
6	Joan Baptiste	United Kingdom	23.84	
7	Heike Schmidt	West Germany	23.88	
8	Mona Evjen	Norway	23.96	

==== Heat 2 ====
Wind: -2.9 m/s

Rank	Name	Nationality	Time	Notes
1	Sabine Günther	East Germany	22.90	Q
2	Gesine Walther	East Germany	22.90	Q
3	Bev Callender	United Kingdom	22.96	Q
4	Marie-Christine Cazier	France	23.39	Q
5	Heide-Elke Gaugel	West Germany	23.45	
6	Yelena Kelchevskaya	Soviet Union	23.59	
7	Marisa Masullo	Italy	23.74	
8	Ute Finger	West Germany	23.85	

== Participation ==
According to an unofficial count, 16 athletes from 8 countries participated in the event.

- Bulgaria (1)
- East Germany (3)
- France (2)
- Italy (1)
- Norway (1)
- Soviet Union (2)
- United Kingdom (3)
- West Germany (3)

== See also ==
- 1978 Women's European Championships 200 metres (Prague)
- 1980 Women's Olympic 200 metres (Moscow)
- 1983 Women's World Championships 200 metres (Helsinki)
- 1984 Women's Olympic 200 metres (Los Angeles)
- 1986 Women's European Championships 200 metres (Stuttgart)
- 1987 Women's World Championships 200 metres (Rome)
- 1988 Women's Olympic 200 metres (Seoul)
