= Athletics at the 1984 Summer Olympics – Women's 4 × 400 metres relay =

Women's 4 × 400 metres relay at the Games of the XXIII Olympiad
- Venue: Los Angeles Memorial Coliseum
- Dates: August 10, 1984 (round 1); August 11, 1984 (final)
- Competitors: 47 from 10 nations
- Winning time: 3:18.29 OR

Medalists
1st place, gold medalist(s)		Lillie Leatherwood, Sherri Howard, Valerie Brisco-Hooks, Chandra Cheeseborough, Diane Dixon*, Denean Howard*	United States
2nd place, silver medalist(s)		Charmaine Crooks, Jillian Richardson, Molly Killingbeck, Marita Payne, Dana Wright*	Canada
3rd place, bronze medalist(s)		Heike Schulte-Mattler, Ute Thimm, Heide-Elke Gaugel, Gaby Bußmann, Nicole Leistenschneider*, Christina Sussiek* * only competed in the preliminary heats.	West Germany

These are the official results of the Women's 4 × 400 m Relay event at the 1984 Summer Olympics in Los Angeles, California. A total of 10 teams competed. The final was held on August 11, 1984.

== Records ==
These were the standing World and Olympic records (in seconds) prior to the 1984 Summer Olympics.

World record	3:15.92	(East Germany) Gesine Walther (East Germany) Sabine Busch (East Germany) Dagmar Rübsam (East Germany) Marita Koch	Erfurt (GDR)	June 3, 1984
Olympic record	3:19.23	(East Germany) Doris Maletzki (East Germany) Brigitte Rohde (East Germany) Ellen Streidt (East Germany) Christina Lathan	Montreal (CAN)	July 31, 1976

== Final ==
- Held on August 11, 1984

RANK	NATION	ATHLETES	TIME
Gold medal	United States	• Lillie Leatherwood • Sherri Howard • Valerie Brisco-Hooks • Chandra Cheeseborough	3:18.29 OR
Silver medal	Canada	• Charmaine Crooks • Jillian Richardson • Molly Killingbeck • Marita Payne	3:21.21
Bronze medal	West Germany	• Heike Schulte-Mattler • Ute Thimm • Heide-Elke Gaugel • Gaby Bußmann	3:22.98
4.	Great Britain	• Michelle Scutt • Helen Barnett • Gladys Taylor • Joslyn Hoyte-Smith	3:25.51
5.	Jamaica	• llrey Oliver • Cynthia Green • Cathy Rattray • Grace Jackson	3:27.51
6.	Italy	• Patrizia Lombardo • Cosetta Campana • Marisa Masullo • Erica Rossi	3:30.82
7.	India	• M. D. Valsamma • Vandana Rao • Shiny Abraham • P. T. Usha	3:32.49
–	Puerto Rico	• Evelyn Mathieu • Madeline De Jesus • Angelita Lind • Marie Lande Mathieu	DNS

== Semi-finals ==
- Held on August 10, 1984

=== Heat 1 ===
RANK	NATION	ATHLETES	TIME
1.	United States	• Lillie Leatherwood • Sherri Howard • Diane Dixon • Denean Howard	3:22.82
2.	Jamaica	• llrey Oliver • Cathy Rattray • Andrea Thomas • Grace Jackson	3:26.56
3.	Great Britain	• Michelle Scutt • Helen Barnett • Gladys Taylor • Joslyn Hoyte-Smith	3:27.68
4.	India	• M. D. Valsamma • Vandana Rao • Shiny Abraham • P. T. Usha	3:33.85
5.	Puerto Rico	• Evelyn Mathieu • "Madeline De Jesus" (de facto Margaret de Jesús) • Angelita Lind • Marie Lande Mathieu	3:37.39

=== Heat 2 ===
RANK	NATION	ATHLETES	TIME
1.	Italy	• Patrizia Lombardo • Cosetta Campana • Giuseppina Cirulli • Erica Rossi	3:32.55
2.	West Germany	• Christina Sussiek • Heike Schulte-Mattler • Nicole Leistenschneider • Gaby Bußmann	3:33.63
3.	Canada	• Dana Wright • Jillian Richardson • Charmaine Crooks • Marita Payne	3:33.78
4.	Antigua and Barbuda	• Joycelyn Joseph • Ruperta Charles • Monica Stevens • Laverne Bryan	3:39.32
5.	Ghana	• Martha Appiah • Mercy Addy • Mary Mensah • Grace Bakari	3:40.38

== See also ==
- 1982 Women's European Championships 4 × 400 m Relay (Athens)
- 1983 Women's World Championships 4 × 400 m Relay (Helsinki)
- 1984 Women's Friendship Games 4 × 400 m Relay (Prague)
- 1987 Women's World Championships 4 × 400 m Relay (Rome)
