= 1985 IAAF World Cup =

Athletic competition

The 4th IAAF World Cup in Athletics was an international track and field sporting event sponsored by the International Association of Athletics Federations, held on October 4–6, 1985, at the Bruce Stadium in Canberra, Australia.

== Overall results ==
=== Men ===
Pos.	Team	Result
1	United States	123
2	Soviet Union	115
3	East Germany	114
4	Europe	97,5
5	Africa	81
6	Americas	80
7	Oceania	65
8	Asia	39,5

=== Women ===
Pos.	Team	Result
1	East Germany	121
2	Soviet Union	105,5
3	Europe	86
4	Americas	62,5
5	United States	61
6	Oceania	52
7	Asia	42
8	Africa	41

== Medal summary ==
=== Men ===
Event	Gold		Silver		Bronze	
100 metres	Ben Johnson (CAN); Americas	10.00	Chidi Imoh (NGR); Africa	10.11	Frank Emmelmann (GDR); East Germany	10.17
200 metres	Robson da Silva (BRA); Americas	20.44	Frank Emmelmann (GDR); East Germany	20.51	Darren Clark (AUS); Oceania	20.78
400 metres	Mike Franks (USA); United States	44.47	Thomas Schönlebe (GDR); East Germany	44.72	Innocent Egbunike (NGR); Africa	44.99
800 metres	Sammy Koskei (KEN); Africa	1:45.14	Viktor Kalinkin (URS); Soviet Union	1:45.72	Agberto Guimarães (BRA); Americas	1:45.80
1500 metres	Omer Khalifa (SUD); Africa	3:41.16	Olaf Beyer (GDR); East German	3:41.26	Igor Lotaryov (URS); Soviet Union	3:41.92
5000 metres	Doug Padilla (USA); United States	14:04.11	Stefano Mei (ITA); Europe	14:05.99	Wodajo Bulti (ETH); Africa	14:07.17
10,000 metres	Wodajo Bulti (ETH); Africa	29:22.96	Pat Porter (USA); United States	29:23.02	Werner Schildhauer (GDR); East Germany	29:25.63
110 metre hurdles	Tonie Campbell (USA); United States	13.35	Sergey Usov (URS); Soviet Union	13.62	Jörg Naumann (GDR); East Germany	13.76
400 metre hurdles	Andre Phillips (USA); United States	48.42	Aleksandr Vasilyev (URS); Soviet Union	48.61	Harald Schmid (FRG); Europe	48.83
3000 metre steeplechase	Julius Kariuki (KEN); Africa	8:39.51	Henry Marsh (USA); United States	8:39.55	Graeme Fell (CAN); Americas	8:40.30
4×100 metre relay	United States; Harvey Glance; Kirk Baptiste; Calvin Smith; Dwayne Evans	38.10	Americas; Desai Williams; Robson da Silva; Leandro Peñalver; Ben Johnson	38.31	Soviet Union; Nikolay Yushmanov; Aleksandr Semyonov; Aleksandr Yevgenyev; Vladimir Muravyov	38.35
4×400 metre relay	United States; Walter McCoy; Andre Phillips; Ray Armstead; Mike Franks	3:00.71	East Germany; Frank Möller; Mathias Schersing; Guido Lieske; Thomas Schönlebe	3:00.82	Oceania; Bruce Frayne; Gary Minihan; Alan Ozolins; Darren Clark	3:01.35
High jump	Patrik Sjöberg (SWE); Europe	2.31	Jim Howard (USA); United States	2.28	Javier Sotomayor (CUB); Americas	2.28
Pole vault	Sergey Bubka (URS); Soviet Union	5.85	Philippe Collet (FRA); Europe	5.50	Tim Bright (USA); United States	5.40
Long jump	Mike Conley (USA); United States	8.20	Robert Emmiyan (URS); Soviet Union	8.09	László Szalma (HUN); Europe	7.95
Triple jump	Willie Banks (USA); United States	17.58	Oleg Protsenko (URS); Soviet Union	17.47	Khristo Markov (BUL); Europe	17.13
Shot put	Ulf Timmermann (GDR); East Germany	22.00	Sergey Smirnov (URS); Soviet Union	21.72	Alessandro Andrei (ITA); Europe	21.14
Discus throw	Georgiy Kolnootchenko (URS); Soviet Union	69.08	Jürgen Schult (GDR); East Germany	68.30	Luis Delís (CUB); Americas	67.60
Hammer throw	Jüri Tamm (URS); Soviet Union	82.12	Günther Rodehau (GDR); East Germany	78.44	Jud Logan (USA); United States	76.88
Javelin throw	Uwe Hohn (GDR); East Germany	96.96	Heino Puuste (URS); Soviet Union	87.40	Tom Petranoff (USA); United States	87.34

=== Women ===
Event	Gold		Silver		Bronze	
100 metres	Marlies Göhr (GDR); East Germany	11.10	Grace Jackson (JAM); Americas; Marina Zhirova (URS); Soviet Union	11.30		
200 metres	Marita Koch (GDR); East Germany	21.90	Grace Jackson (JAM); Americas	22.61	Marina Zhirova (URS); Soviet Union	22.66
400 metres	Marita Koch (GDR); East Germany	47.60; WR	Olga Vladykina (URS); Soviet Union	48.27	Lillie Leatherwood (USA); United States	50.43
800 metres	Christine Wachtel (GDR); East Germany	2:01.57	Jarmila Kratochvílová (TCH); Europe	2:01.99	Nadiya Olizarenko (URS); Soviet Union	2:02.17
1500 metres	Hildegard Körner (GDR); East Germany	4:10.86	Ravilya Agletdinova (URS); Soviet Union	4:11.21	Doina Melinte (ROU); Europe	4:19.66
3000 metres	Ulrike Bruns (GDR); East Germany	9:14.65	Tatyana Pozdnyakova (URS); Soviet Union	9:15.65	Cindy Bremser (USA); United States	9:21.15
10,000 metres	Aurora Cunha (POR); Europe	32:07.50	Mary Knisely (USA); United States	32:19.93	Olga Bondarenko (URS); Soviet Union	32:27.70
100 metre hurdles	Cornelia Oschkenat (GDR); East Germany	12.72	Ginka Zagorcheva (BUL); Europe	12.72	Svetlana Gusarova (URS); Soviet Union	13.01
400 metre hurdles	Sabine Busch (GDR); East Germany	54.44	Judi Brown-King (USA); United States	55.10	Debbie Flintoff (AUS); Oceania	55.34
4×100 metre relay	East Germany; Silke Gladisch; Sabine Rieger; Ingrid Auerswald; Marlies Göhr	41.37; WR	Soviet Union; Antonina Nastoburko; Natalya Bochina; Marina Zhirova; Elvira Barbashina	42.54	Europe; Iwona Pakuła; Ginka Zagorcheva; Ewa Pisiewicz; Ewa Kasprzyk	43.38
4×400 metre relay	East Germany; Kirsten Emmelmann; Sabine Busch; Dagmar Neubauer; Marita Koch	3:19.49	Soviet Union; Tatyana Alekseyeva; Irina Nazarova; Mariya Pinigina; Olga Vladykina	3:20.60	Europe; Rositsa Stamenova; Erica Rossi; Alena Bulirová; Jarmila Kratochvílová	3:28.47
High jump	Stefka Kostadinova (BUL); Europe	2.00	Tamara Bykova (URS); Soviet Union	1.97	Susanne Helm (GDR); East Germany	1.97
Long jump	Heike Drechsler (GDR); East Germany	7.27	Galina Chistyakova (URS); Soviet Union	7.00	Carol Lewis (USA); United States	6.88
Shot put	Natalya Lisovskaya (URS); Soviet Union	20.69	Heike Hartwig (GDR); East Germany	19.98	Helena Fibingerová (TCH); Europe	19.17
Discus throw	Martina Opitz (GDR); East Germany	69.78	Galina Savinkova (URS); Soviet Union	67.30	Maritza Martén (CUB); Americas	66.54
Javelin throw	Olga Gavrilova (URS); Soviet Union	66.80	Petra Felke (GDR); East Germany	66.22	Fatima Whitbread (GBR); Europe	65.12
