= Christiane Brinkmann =

German athlete

Christiane Brinkmann (born 8 July 1962 in Mettmann, North Rhine-Westphalia) is a retired athlete who represented West Germany. She specialized in the 400 metres sprint and ran for the club LG Bayer Leverkusen.

On 30 January 1981 in Dortmund she ran a new world record of 3:34,38 minutes in 4 x 400 metres relay with the West German national team. The team consisted of Heidi-Elke Gaugel, Christina Sussiek, Christiane Brinkmann and Gaby Bußmann.

At the 1982 European Championships in Athletics she finished fourth in 4 × 400 m relay with teammates Ute Finger, Heike Schmidt and Gaby Bußmann.
