= Athletics at the Friendship Games – Women's 200 metres =

The women's 200 metres event at the Friendship Games was held on 17 August 1984 at the Evžen Rošický Stadium in Prague, Czechoslovakia.

== Medalists ==
Gold	Silver	Bronze
Bärbel Wöckel; East Germany	Svetlana Zhizdrikova; Soviet Union	Nadezhda Georgieva; Bulgaria

== Results ==
=== Heats ===
Wind:
Heat 1: -0.3 m/s, Heat 2: +0.4 m/s

Rank	Heat	Name	Nationality	Time	Notes
1	2	Bärbel Wöckel	East Germany	22.81	Q
2	2	Nadezhda Georgieva	Bulgaria	22.83	Q
3	1	Gesine Walther	East Germany	23.00	Q
4	2	Svetlana Zhizdrikova	Soviet Union	23.02	Q
5	1	Maia Azarashvili	Soviet Union	23.18	Q
6	1	Ewa Kasprzyk	Poland	23.19	Q
7	1	Anelia Nuneva	Bulgaria	23.30	q
8	1	Ana Fidelia Quirot	Cuba	23.40	q
9	2	Elżbieta Woźniak	Poland	23.43	qB
10	2	Vroni Werthmüller	Switzerland	24.13	qB
11	1	Renata Černochová	Czechoslovakia	24.19	qB
12	2	Štěpánka Sokolová	Czechoslovakia	24.22	qB
13	1	Grace Pardy	Austria	24.74	qB

=== "A" Final ===
Wind: +0.4 m/s

Rank	Name	Nationality	Time	Notes
1st place, gold medalist(s)	Bärbel Wöckel	East Germany	22.15	
2nd place, silver medalist(s)	Svetlana Zhizdrikova	Soviet Union	22.75	
3rd place, bronze medalist(s)	Nadezhda Georgieva	Bulgaria	22.79	
4	Gesine Walther	East Germany	22.82	
5	Anelia Nuneva	Bulgaria	22.84	
6	Ewa Kasprzyk	Poland	23.14	
7	Maia Azarashvili	Soviet Union	23.30	
8	Ana Fidelia Quirot	Cuba	23.61	

=== "B" Final ===
Wind: +0.2 m/s

Rank	Name	Nationality	Time	Notes
1	Elżbieta Woźniak	Poland	23.54	
2	Renata Černochová	Czechoslovakia	24.13	
3	Vroni Werthmüller	Switzerland	24.28	
4	Štěpánka Sokolová	Czechoslovakia	24.30	
5	Grace Pardy	Austria	24.80	

== See also ==
- Athletics at the 1984 Summer Olympics – Women's 200 metres
