= 1982 European Athletics Indoor Championships – Women's 200 metres =

The women's 200 metres event at the 1982 European Athletics Indoor Championships was held on 6–7 March. It was the first time that this event was held at the European Athletics Indoor Championships.

== Medalists ==
Gold	Silver	Bronze
Gesine Walther; East Germany	Yelena Kelchevskaya; Soviet Union	Heide-Elke Gaugel; West Germany

== Results ==
=== Heats ===
First 2 of each heat (Q) and the next 2 fastest (q) qualified for the semifinals.

Rank	Heat	Name	Nationality	Time	Notes
1	3	Gesine Walther	East Germany	23.36	Q, CR
2	2	Yelena Kelchevskaya	Soviet Union	23.44	Q
3	3	Nadezhda Georgieva	Bulgaria	23.57	Q
4	1	Heide-Elke Gaugel	West Germany	23.68	Q
5	1	Marie-Christine Cazier	France	23.74	Q
6	1	Els Vader	Netherlands	23.84	q
7	3	Ruth Patten	Great Britain	23.85	q
8	2	Irén Orosz	Hungary	23.92	Q
9	2	Claudia Steger	West Germany	24.07	
10	3	Liliane Meganck	Belgium	24.65	

=== Semifinals ===
First 2 from each semifinal qualified directly (Q) for the final.

Rank	Heat	Name	Nationality	Time	Notes
1	1	Gesine Walther	East Germany	22.89	Q, CR
2	2	Yelena Kelchevskaya	Soviet Union	23.45	Q
3	1	Heide-Elke Gaugel	West Germany	23.56	Q
4	1	Irén Orosz	Hungary	23.61	NR
5	2	Els Vader	Netherlands	23.63	Q
6	2	Ruth Patten	Great Britain	23.79	
7	1	Marie-Christine Cazier	France	23.82	
8	2	Nadezhda Georgieva	Bulgaria	23.85	

=== Final ===
Rank	Name	Nationality	Time	Notes
1st place, gold medalist(s)	Gesine Walther	East Germany	22.80	CR
2nd place, silver medalist(s)	Yelena Kelchevskaya	Soviet Union	23.35	NR
3rd place, bronze medalist(s)	Heide-Elke Gaugel	West Germany	23.39	
4	Els Vader	Netherlands	23.89	
