= 1981 European Athletics Indoor Championships – Women's 50 metres =

The women's 50 metres event at the 1981 European Athletics Indoor Championships was held on 22 February.

== Medalists ==
Gold	Silver	Bronze
Sofka Popova; Bulgaria	Linda Haglund; Sweden	Marita Koch; East Germany

== Results ==
=== Heats ===
First 2 from each heat (Q) and the next 4 fastest (q) qualified for the semifinals.

Rank	Heat	Name	Nationality	Time	Notes
1	2	Sofka Popova	Bulgaria	6.20	Q, CR
2	2	Linda Haglund	Sweden	6.20	Q, CR
3	3	Wendy Hoyte	Great Britain	6.21	Q
4	1	Marita Koch	East Germany	6.26	Q
5	4	Ingrid Auerswald	East Germany	6.26	Q
6	2	Helinä Laihorinne	Finland	6.27	q
7	2	Olga Korotkova	Soviet Union	6.27	q
8	3	Marisa Masullo	Italy	6.31	Q
9	3	Laureen Beckles	France	6.34	q
10	1	Dorthe Rasmussen	Denmark	6.35	Q
11	1	Christina Sussiek	West Germany	6.39	q
12	3	Lena Möller	Sweden	6.40	
12	4	Monika Hirsch	West Germany	6.40	Q
14	4	Laurence Bily	France	6.42	
15	1	Liliane Meganck	Belgium	6.45	
15	3	Dijana Sokač	Yugoslavia	6.45	
17	1	Odile Madkaud	France	6.46	
18	3	Lidiya Gusheva	Bulgaria	6.48	
19	1	Brigitte Haest	Austria	6.52	
20	4	Lena Wallin	Sweden	6.63	
	2	Karoline Käfer	Austria	DNS	
	2	Lisbeth Pedersen	Denmark	DNS	

=== Semifinals ===
First 3 from each semifinal qualified directly (Q) for the final.

Rank	Heat	Name	Nationality	Time	Notes
1	2	Linda Haglund	Sweden	6.17	Q, CR
2	2	Marita Koch	East Germany	6.19	Q
3	1	Ingrid Auerswald	East Germany	6.20	Q
4	1	Sofka Popova	Bulgaria	6.21	Q
5	1	Wendy Hoyte	Great Britain	6.24	Q
6	2	Olga Korotkova	Soviet Union	6.25	Q
7	1	Helinä Laihorinne	Finland	6.28	
8	2	Laureen Beckles	France	6.29	
9	1	Monika Hirsch	West Germany	6.32	
9	2	Marisa Masullo	Italy	6.32	
9	2	Christina Sussiek	West Germany	6.32	
12	1	Dorthe Rasmussen	Denmark	6.33	NR

=== Final ===
Rank	Name	Nationality	Time	Notes
1st place, gold medalist(s)	Sofka Popova	Bulgaria	6.17	=CR
2nd place, silver medalist(s)	Linda Haglund	Sweden	6.17	=CR
3rd place, bronze medalist(s)	Marita Koch	East Germany	6.19	
4	Ingrid Auerswald	East Germany	6.20	
5	Olga Korotkova	Soviet Union	6.22	
6	Wendy Hoyte	Great Britain	6.30	
