= 1986 European Athletics Championships – Women's 4 × 100 metres relay =

Women's 4 × 100 metres relay at the European Athletics Championships

The women's 4 × 100 metres relay event at the 1986 European Athletics Championships was held in Stuttgart, then West Germany, at Neckarstadion on 30 and 31 August 1986.

== Medalists ==
Gold	Silke Gladisch; Sabine Günther; Ingrid Auerswald; Marlies Göhr; East Germany
Silver	Ginka Zagorcheva; Anelia Nuneva; Nadezhda Georgieva; Yordanka Donkova; Bulgaria
Bronze	Antonina Nastoburko; Natalya Bochina; Marina Zhirova; Olga Zolotaryova; Soviet Union

== Results ==
=== Final ===
31 August

Rank	Nation	Competitors	Time	Notes
1st place, gold medalist(s)	East Germany	Silke Gladisch; Sabine Günther; Ingrid Auerswald; Marlies Göhr	41.84	CR
2nd place, silver medalist(s)	Bulgaria	Ginka Zagorcheva; Anelia Nuneva; Nadezhda Georgieva; Yordanka Donkova	42.68	
3rd place, bronze medalist(s)	Soviet Union	Antonina Nastoburko; Natalya Bochina; Marina Zhirova; Olga Zolotaryova	42.74	
4	France	Françoise Leroux; Marie-Christine Cazier; Laurence Bily; Muriel Leroy	43.11	
5	United Kingdom	Paula Dunn; Kathy Cook; Joan Baptiste; Wendy Hoyte	43.44	
6	Poland	Joanna Smolarek; Urszula Jaros; Jolanta Janota; Ewa Kasprzyk	43.54	
7	Netherlands	Nelli Cooman; Martha Grossenbacher; Marjan Olyslager; Els Vader	44.38	
	West Germany	Resi März; Anke Köninger; Heidi-Elke Gaugel; Ute Thimm	DQ	

=== Heats ===
30 August

==== Heat 1 ====
Rank	Nation	Competitors	Time	Notes
1	East Germany	Silke Gladisch; Sabine Günther; Ingrid Auerswald; Marlies Göhr	42.13	CR Q
2	West Germany	Resi März; Anke Köninger; Heidi-Elke Gaugel; Ute Thimm	43.51	Q
3	Poland	Joanna Smolarek; Urszula Jaros; Jolanta Janota; Ewa Kasprzyk	43.96	Q
4	Netherlands	Nelli Cooman; Martha Grossenbacher; Marjan Olyslager; Els Vader	44.38	q
5	Finland	Aila Haikkonen; Sisko Hanhijoki; Margareetta Honkaharju; Jaana Niemi	45.27	

==== Heat 2 ====
Rank	Nation	Competitors	Time	Notes
1	Bulgaria	Ginka Zagorcheva; Anelia Nuneva; Nadezhda Georgieva; Yordanka Donkova	43.02	Q
2	France	Françoise Leroux; Marie-Christine Cazier; Laurence Bily; Muriel Leroy	43.20	Q
3	United Kingdom	Paula Dunn; Kathy Cook; Joan Baptiste; Wendy Hoyte	43.30	Q
4	Soviet Union	Antonina Nastoburko; Natalya Bochina; Irina Slyusar; Olga Zolotaryova	43.78	q
5	Italy	Rita Angotzi; Carla Mercurio; Daniela Ferrian; Rossella Tarolo	44.90	

== Participation ==
According to an unofficial count, 41 athletes from 10 countries participated in the event.

- Bulgaria (4)
- East Germany (4)
- Finland (4)
- France (4)
- Italy (4)
- Netherlands (4)
- Poland (4)
- Soviet Union (5)
- United Kingdom (4)
- West Germany (4)
