= Athletics at the 1984 Summer Olympics =

Athletics at the Games of the XXIII Olympiad
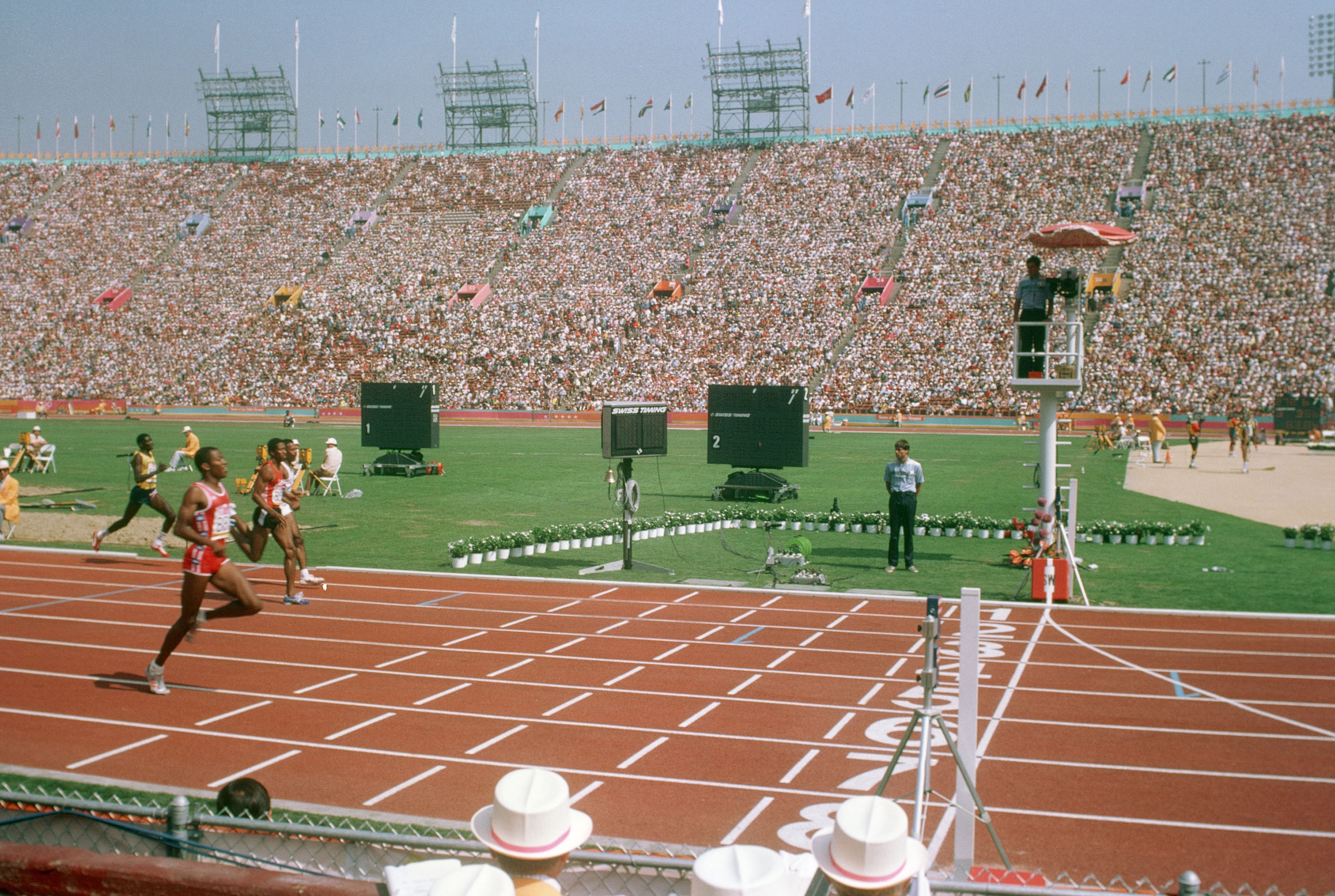
- Athletes during the men’s 400 meters event
- Venue: Los Angeles Memorial Coliseum
- No. of events: 41
- Competitors: 1,273 from 124 nations

At the 1984 Summer Olympics in Los Angeles, 41 events in athletics were contested. There were a total number of 1273 participating athletes from 124 countries. Women's marathon, women's 3000 meters, and women's 400 meters hurdles debuted at these Games.

== Medal table ==
Rank	Nation	Gold	Silver	Bronze	Total
1	United States	16	15	9	40
2	West Germany	4	2	5	11
3	Great Britain	3	7	6	16
4	Romania	3	3	4	10
5	Italy	3	1	3	7
6	Finland	2	1	1	4
7	Mexico	2	1	0	3
8	Morocco	2	0	0	2
9	France	1	1	2	4
10	Australia	1	1	1	3
11	Portugal	1	0	2	3
12	Kenya	1	0	1	2
13	Brazil	1	0	0	1
13	Netherlands	1	0	0	1
15	Canada	0	2	3	5
16	Sweden	0	2	1	3
17	Jamaica	0	1	2	3
18	Ireland	0	1	0	1
18	Ivory Coast	0	1	0	1
18	Norway	0	1	0	1
18	Switzerland	0	1	0	1
22	China	0	0	1	1
22	Nigeria	0	0	1	1
22	Spain	0	0	1	1
Totals (24 entries)		41	41	43	125

== Medal summary ==
=== Men ===
Event	Gold		Silver		Bronze	
100 metres	Carl Lewis; United States	9.99	Sam Graddy; United States	10.19	Ben Johnson; Canada	10.22
200 metres	Carl Lewis; United States	19.80 OR	Kirk Baptiste; United States	19.96	Thomas Jefferson; United States	20.26
400 metres	Alonzo Babers; United States	44.27	Gabriel Tiacoh; Ivory Coast	44.54	Antonio McKay; United States	44.71
800 metres	Joaquim Cruz; Brazil	1:43.00 OR	Sebastian Coe; Great Britain	1:43.64	Earl Jones; United States	1:43.83
1500 metres	Sebastian Coe; Great Britain	3:32.53 OR	Steve Cram; Great Britain	3:33.40	José Manuel Abascal; Spain	3:34.30
5000 metres	Saïd Aouita; Morocco	13:05.59 OR	Markus Ryffel; Switzerland	13:07.54	António Leitão; Portugal	13:09.20
10,000 metres	Alberto Cova; Italy	27:47.54	Mike McLeod; Great Britain	28:06.22	Michael Musyoki; Kenya	28:06.46
110 metres hurdles	Roger Kingdom; United States	13.20 OR	Greg Foster; United States	13.23	Arto Bryggare; Finland	13.40
400 metres hurdles	Edwin Moses; United States	47.75	Danny Harris; United States	48.13	Harald Schmid; West Germany	48.19
3000 metres steeplechase	Julius Korir; Kenya	8:11.80	Joseph Mahmoud; France	8:13.31	Brian Diemer; United States	8:14.06
4 × 100 metres relay	United States; Sam Graddy; Ron Brown; Calvin Smith; Carl Lewis	37.83 WR	Jamaica; Al Lawrence; Greg Meghoo; Don Quarrie; Ray Stewart; Norman Edwards*	38.62	Canada; Ben Johnson; Tony Sharpe; Desai Williams; Sterling Hinds	38.70
4 × 400 metres relay	United States; Sunder Nix; Ray Armstead; Alonzo Babers; Antonio McKay; Walter McCoy*; Willie Smith*	2:57.91	Great Britain; Kriss Akabusi; Garry Cook; Todd Bennett; Phil Brown	2:59.13	Nigeria; Sunday Uti; Moses Ugbusien; Rotimi Peters; Innocent Egbunike	2:59.32
Marathon	Carlos Lopes; Portugal	2:09:21 OR	John Treacy; Ireland	2:09:56	Charlie Spedding; Great Britain	2:09:58
20 kilometres walk	Ernesto Canto; Mexico	1:23:13 OR	Raúl González; Mexico	1:23:20	Maurizio Damilano; Italy	1:23:26
50 kilometres walk	Raúl González; Mexico	3:47:26 OR	Bo Gustafsson; Sweden	3:53:19	Sandro Bellucci; Italy	3:53:45
High jump	Dietmar Mögenburg; West Germany	2.35 m	Patrik Sjöberg; Sweden	2.33 m	Zhu Jianhua; China	2.31 m
Pole vault	Pierre Quinon; France	5.75 m	Mike Tully; United States	5.65 m	Earl Bell; United States	5.60 m
Pole vault	Pierre Quinon; France	5.75 m	Mike Tully; United States	5.65 m	Thierry Vigneron; France	5.60 m
Long jump	Carl Lewis; United States	8.54 m	Gary Honey; Australia	8.24 m	Giovanni Evangelisti; Italy	8.24 m
Triple jump	Al Joyner; United States	17.26 m	Mike Conley; United States	17.18 m	Keith Connor; Great Britain	16.87 m
Shot put	Alessandro Andrei; Italy	21.26 m	Michael Carter; United States	21.09 m	Dave Laut; United States	20.97 m
Discus throw	Rolf Danneberg; West Germany	66.60 m	Mac Wilkins; United States	66.30 m	John Powell; United States	65.46 m
Hammer throw	Juha Tiainen; Finland	78.08 m	Karl-Hans Riehm; West Germany	77.98 m	Klaus Ploghaus; West Germany	76.68 m
Javelin throw	Arto Härkönen; Finland	86.76 m	David Ottley; Great Britain	85.74 m	Kenth Eldebrink; Sweden	83.72 m
Decathlon	Daley Thompson; Great Britain	8798 EWR	Jürgen Hingsen; West Germany	8673	Siegfried Wentz; West Germany	8412

=== Women ===
Games	Gold		Silver		Bronze	
100 metres	Evelyn Ashford; United States	10.97 OR	Alice Brown; United States	11.13	Merlene Ottey; Jamaica	11.16
200 metres	Valerie Brisco-Hooks; United States	21.81 OR	Florence Griffith; United States	22.04	Merlene Ottey; Jamaica	22.09
400 metres	Valerie Brisco-Hooks; United States	48.83 OR	Chandra Cheeseborough; United States	49.05	Kathy Smallwood-Cook; Great Britain	49.42
800 metres	Doina Melinte; Romania	1:57.60	Kim Gallagher; United States	1:58.63	Fița Lovin; Romania	1:58.83
1500 metres	Gabriella Dorio; Italy	4:03.25	Doina Melinte; Romania	4:03.76	Maricica Puică; Romania	4:04.15
3000 metres	Maricica Puică; Romania	8:35.96 OR	Wendy Sly; Great Britain	8:39.47	Lynn Williams; Canada	8:42.14
100 metres hurdles	Benita Fitzgerald; United States	12.84	Shirley Strong; Great Britain	12.88	Michèle Chardonnet; France	13.06
100 metres hurdles	Benita Fitzgerald; United States	12.84	Shirley Strong; Great Britain	12.88	Kim Turner; United States	13.06
400 metres hurdles	Nawal El Moutawakel; Morocco	54.61 OR	Judi Brown; United States	55.20	Cristieana Cojocaru; Romania	55.41
4 × 100 metres relay	United States; Alice Brown; Jeanette Bolden; Chandra Cheeseborough; Evelyn Ashford	41.65	Canada; Angela Bailey; Marita Payne; Angella Taylor-Issajenko; France Gareau	42.77	Great Britain; Simmone Jacobs; Kathy Smallwood-Cook; Beverley Goddard; Heather Hunte	43.11
4 × 400 metres relay	United States; Lillie Leatherwood; Sherri Howard; Valerie Brisco-Hooks; Chandra Cheeseborough; Diane Dixon*; Denean Howard*	3:18.29 OR	Canada; Charmaine Crooks; Jillian Richardson; Molly Killingbeck; Marita Payne; Dana Wright*	3:21.21	West Germany; Heike Schulte-Mattler; Ute Thimm; Heidi-Elke Gaugel; Gaby Bußmann; Nicole Leistenschneider*; Christina Sussiek*	3:22.98
Marathon	Joan Benoit; United States	2:24:52 OR	Grete Waitz; Norway	2:26:18	Rosa Mota; Portugal	2:26:57
High jump	Ulrike Meyfarth; West Germany	2.02 m OR	Sara Simeoni; Italy	2.00 m	Joni Huntley; United States	1.97 m
Long jump	Anișoara Cușmir-Stanciu; Romania	6.96 m	Vali Ionescu; Romania	6.81 m	Sue Hearnshaw; Great Britain	6.80 m
Shot put	Claudia Losch; West Germany	20.48 m	Mihaela Loghin; Romania	20.47 m	Gael Martin; Australia	19.19 m
Discus throw	Ria Stalman; Netherlands	65.36 m	Leslie Deniz; United States	64.86 m	Florența Crăciunescu; Romania	63.64 m
Javelin throw	Tessa Sanderson; Great Britain	69.56 m OR	Tiina Lillak; Finland	69.00 m	Fatima Whitbread; Great Britain	67.14 m
Heptathlon	Glynis Nunn; Australia	6390 OR	Jackie Joyner; United States	6385	Sabine Everts; West Germany	6363

- * Athletes who ran in preliminary round and also received medals.

== See also ==
- Athletics at the Friendship Games
- 1984 in athletics (track and field)
