= Athletics at the 1977 Summer Universiade – Women's 4 × 100 metres relay =

The women's 4 × 100 metres relay event at the 1977 Summer Universiade was held at the Vasil Levski National Stadium in Sofia on 22 and 23 August.

== Results ==
=== Heats ===
Rank	Heat	Nation	Athletes	Time	Notes
1	2	Soviet Union	Lyudmila Maslakova, Vera Anisimova, Marina Sidorova, Tatyana Prorochenko	43.72	Q
2	2	Bulgaria	Sofka Popova, Atanaska Georgieva, Mariya Shishkova, Lyubina Dimitrova	44.55	Q
3	1	Cuba	Isabel Taylor, Silvia Chivás, Grisel Machado, Asunción Acosta	44.70	Q
4	2	France	Emma Sulter, Marie-Pierre Philippe, Nadine Diakonoff, Chantal Réga	44.89	Q
5	1	United States	Renaye Bowen, Patty Van Wolvelaere, Rosalyn Bryant, Jodi Anderson	44.95	Q
6	1	Poland	Bogusława Kaniecka, Helena Fliśnik, Ewa Witkowska, Ewa Długołęcka	45.14	Q
7	1	Italy	Rita Bottiglieri, Adriana Carli, Mariella Bonsangue, Paola Bolognesi	45.48	q
8	1	Puerto Rico	Nerva Bultron, Nilsa Paris, Marie Lande Mathieu, Vilma Paris	45.98	q
9	2	Kuwait	Salaman, L. Abbas, ?, ?	1:01.84	
	2	Canada	Jean Sparling, Margaret Howe, Margaret Stride, Patty Loverock	DQ	

=== Final ===
Rank	Nation	Athletes	Time	Notes
1st place, gold medalist(s)	Soviet Union	Lyudmila Maslakova, Vera Anisimova, Marina Sidorova, Tatyana Prorochenko	43.16	
2nd place, silver medalist(s)	Bulgaria	Sofka Popova, Atanaska Georgieva, Ivanka Valkova, Lyubina Dimitrova	44.30	
3rd place, bronze medalist(s)	Poland	Bogusława Kaniecka, Helena Fliśnik, Ewa Witkowska, Ewa Długołęcka	44.79	
4	Cuba	Isabel Taylor, Silvia Chivás, Grisel Machado, Asunción Acosta	44.81	
5	Italy	Rita Bottiglieri, Adriana Carli, Mariella Bonsangue, Paola Bolognesi	45.34	
6	Puerto Rico	Nerva Bultron, Nilsa Paris, Marie Lande Mathieu, Vilma Paris	45.78	
	France	Emma Sulter, Marie-Pierre Philippe, Nadine Diakonoff, Chantal Réga	DQ	
	United States		DNS	
