= 1986 European Athletics Indoor Championships – Women's 200 metres =

The women's 200 metres event at the 1986 European Athletics Indoor Championships was held on 22 and 23 February.

== Medalists ==
| Gold | Silver | Bronze |
|---|---|---|
| Marita Koch; East Germany | Ewa Kasprzyk; Poland | Kirsten Emmelmann; East Germany |

== Results ==
=== Heats ===
First 2 from each heat (Q) and the next 2 fastest (q) qualified for the semifinals.

| Rank | Heat | Name | Nationality | Time | Notes |
|---|---|---|---|---|---|
| 1 | 1 | Marita Koch | East Germany | 23.04 | Q |
| 2 | 2 | Kirsten Emmelmann | East Germany | 23.34 | Q |
| 3 | 2 | Ewa Kasprzyk | Poland | 23.37 | Q |
| 4 | 3 | Ewa Pisiewicz | Poland | 23.65 | Q |
| 5 | 1 | Irina Slyusar | Soviet Union | 23.65 | Q |
| 6 | 3 | Sabine Rieger | East Germany | 24.05 | Q |
| 7 | 3 | Blanca Lacambra | Spain | 24.16 | q |
| 8 | 2 | Fabienne Ficher | France | 24.17 | q |
| 9 | 1 | Jennifer Stoute | Great Britain | 24.25 | |
| 10 | 1 | Tsvetanka Ilieva | Bulgaria | 24.29 | |
| 11 | 3 | Rossella Tarolo | Italy | 24.34 | |
| 12 | 2 | Gerda Haas | Austria | 24.68 | |

=== Semifinals ===
First 2 from each semifinal qualified directly (Q) for the final.

| Rank | Heat | Name | Nationality | Time | Notes |
|---|---|---|---|---|---|
| 1 | 1 | Marita Koch | East Germany | 22.89 | Q |
| 2 | 2 | Kirsten Emmelmann | East Germany | 23.25 | Q |
| 3 | 2 | Ewa Kasprzyk | Poland | 23.26 | Q |
| 4 | 1 | Ewa Pisiewicz | Poland | 23.33 | Q |
| 5 | 1 | Irina Slyusar | Soviet Union | 23.46 | |
| 6 | 2 | Sabine Rieger | East Germany | 23.83 | |
| 7 | 2 | Blanca Lacambra | Spain | 24.14 | |
| 8 | 1 | Fabienne Ficher | France | 24.38 | |

=== Final ===
| Rank | Name | Nationality | Time | Notes |
|---|---|---|---|---|
| 1st place, gold medalist(s) | Marita Koch | East Germany | 22.58 | |
| 2nd place, silver medalist(s) | Ewa Kasprzyk | Poland | 22.96 | |
| 3rd place, bronze medalist(s) | Kirsten Emmelmann | East Germany | 23.28 | |
| 4 | Ewa Pisiewicz | Poland | 23.63 | |
