= Antonina Nastoburko =

Personal information
- Nationality: Ukrainian
- Born: 21 January 1959 (age 67)

Sport
- Country: Soviet Union
- Sport: Athletics
- Events: 100 metres 4 × 100 metres relay

Achievements and titles
- Personal best: 100 m: 11.27 (1985)
Medal record
Women's athletics
Representing Soviet Union
European Championships
Bronze medal – third place	1986 Stuttgart	4×100 m
World Cup
Silver medal – second place	1985 Canberra	4×100 m

Antonina Nastoburko (Russian: Антонина Настобурко; Ukrainian: Антоніна Настобурко), née Pobyubko; born 21 January 1959) is a Ukrainian female former Soviet track and field sprinter who competed in the 100 metres. She was a member of the silver medal-winning Soviet 4 × 100 metres relay team at the 1985 IAAF World Cup, leading off the race for teammates Natalya Bochina, Marina Zhirova and Elvira Barbashina. She ran individually and in the relay at the 1986 European Athletics Championships, making it to the semi-finals of the women's 100 m and taking a bronze medal in the relay alongside Bochina, Zhirova, and Olga Zolotaryova. She also competed at the 1986 Goodwill Games in Moscow that year, taking sixth place in the women's 100 m.

Her lifetime best for the women's 100 m was 11.27 seconds, set in Leningrad on 2 August 1985. She helped set the all-time Soviet record for the 4 × 100 metres relay, running the first leg in a team with Natalya Pomoshchnikova-Voronova, Marina Zhirova and Elvira Barbashina.

== International competitions ==
Year	Competition	Venue	Position	Event	Notes
1985	World Cup	Canberra, Australia	2nd	4 × 100 m relay	42.54
1986	Goodwill Games	Moscow, Soviet Union	6th	100 m	11.29
1986	European Championships	Stuttgart, West Germany	6th (sf)	100 m	11.33
1986	European Championships	Stuttgart, West Germany	3rd	4 × 100 m relay	42.74

== See also ==
- List of European Athletics Championships medalists (women)
