= Athletics at the 1980 Summer Olympics – Women's 100 metres =

Women's 100 metres at the Games of the XXII Olympiad
- Venue: Lenin Stadium
- Date: 25–26 July 1980
- Competitors: 40 from 25 nations
- Winning time: 11.06

Medalists
1st place, gold medalist(s)		Lyudmila Kondratyeva; Soviet Union
2nd place, silver medalist(s)		Marlies Göhr; East Germany
3rd place, bronze medalist(s)		Ingrid Auerswald; East Germany

The women's 100 metres was an event at the 1980 Summer Olympics in Moscow. The competition was held on July 25, 1980, and on July 26, 1980.

== Results ==
=== Heats ===
The heats were held on Friday July 25, 1980.

==== Heat 1 ====
Rank	Athlete	Nation	Time	Notes
1	Ingrid Auerswald	East Germany	11.32	Q
2	Chantal Réga	France	11.53	Q
3	Rosie Allwood	Jamaica	11.68	Q
4	Brigitte Senglaub	Switzerland	11.69	Q
5	Helinä Marjamaa	Finland	11.70	q
6	P. T. Usha	India	12.27	
7	Bessey de Létourdie	Seychelles	13.04	
—	Elżbieta Stachurska	Poland	DSQ	

==== Heat 2 ====
Rank	Athlete	Nation	Time	Notes
1	Romy Müller	East Germany	11.41	Q
2	Denise Boyd	Australia	11.56	Q
3	Sonia Lannaman	Great Britain	11.58	Q
4	Marisa Masullo	Italy	11.77	Q
5	Leleith Hodges	Jamaica	11.79	
6	Marième Boye	Senegal	12.42	
7	Edwige Bancole	Benin	13.19	
8	Seuth Khampa	Laos	14.62	

==== Heat 3 ====
Rank	Athlete	Nation	Time	Notes
1	Marlies Göhr	East Germany	11.41	Q
2	Vera Anisimova	Soviet Union	11.53	Q
3	Mariya Shishkova	Bulgaria	11.57	Q
4	Els Vader	Netherlands	11.61	Q
5	Oguzoeme Nsenu	Nigeria	11.72	q
6	Françoise Damado	Senegal	12.16	
7	Mosi Alli	Tanzania	12.19	
8	Eugenia Osho-Williams	Sierra Leone	12.95	

==== Heat 4 ====
Rank	Athlete	Nation	Time	Notes
1	Lyudmila Kondratyeva	Soviet Union	11.13	Q
2	Linda Haglund	Sweden	11.37	Q
3	Heather Hunte	Great Britain	11.40	Q
4	Emma Sulter	France	11.56	Q
5	Rufina Ubah	Nigeria	11.75	q
6	Jennifer Innis	Guyana	11.79	
7	Estella Meheux	Sierra Leone	13.22	
8	Trần Thanh Vân	Vietnam	13.23	

==== Heat 5 ====
Rank	Athlete	Nation	Time	Notes
1	Sofka Popova	Bulgaria	11.35	Q
2	Kathy Smallwood	Great Britain	11.37	Q
3	Natalya Bochina	Soviet Union	11.38	Q
4	Laureen Beckles	France	11.59	Q
5	Debbie Wells	Australia	11.72	q
6	Nzaeli Kyomo	Tanzania	11.77	
7	Carmela Bolívar	Peru	12.07	
8	Ruth Enang Mesode	Cameroon	12.40	

=== Quarterfinals ===
The quarterfinals were held on Friday July 25, 1980.

==== Quarterfinal 1 ====
Rank	Athlete	Nation	Time	Notes
1	Lyudmila Kondratyeva	Soviet Union	11.06	Q
2	Romy Müller	East Germany	11.09	Q
3	Heather Hunte	Great Britain	11.25	Q
4	Denise Boyd	Australia	11.35	Q
5	Mariya Shishkova	Bulgaria	11.47	Q
6	Emma Sulter	France	11.48	q
7	Brigitte Senglaub	Switzerland	11.56	
8	Marisa Masullo	Italy	11.57	

==== Quarterfinal 2 ====
Rank	Athlete	Nation	Time	Notes
1	Marlies Göhr	East Germany	11.12	Q
2	Kathy Smallwood	Great Britain	11.24	Q
3	Natalya Bochina	Soviet Union	11.30	Q
4	Sofka Popova	Bulgaria	11.42	Q
5	Laureen Beckles	France	11.54	Q
6	Oguzoeme Nsenu	Nigeria	11.55	
7	Debbie Wells	Australia	11.66	
8	Rosie Allwood	Jamaica	11.69	

==== Quarterfinal 3 ====
Rank	Athlete	Nation	Time	Notes
1	Ingrid Auerswald	East Germany	11.12	Q
2	Sonia Lannaman	Great Britain	11.20	Q
3	Linda Haglund	Sweden	11.31	Q
4	Vera Anisimova	Soviet Union	11.33	Q
5	Chantal Réga	France	11.40	Q
6	Rufina Ubah	Nigeria	11.60	
—	Els Vader	Netherlands	DNF	
—	Helinä Laihorinne	Finland	DNF	

=== Semifinals ===
The semifinals were held on Saturday July 26, 1980.

==== Semifinal 1 ====
Rank	Athlete	Nation	Time	Notes
1	Romy Müller	East Germany	11.22	Q
2	Ingrid Auerswald	East Germany	11.27	Q
3	Kathy Smallwood	Great Britain	11.30	Q
4	Heather Hunte	Great Britain	11.36	Q
5	Vera Anisimova	Soviet Union	11.51	
6	Emma Sulter	France	11.63	
7	Mariya Shishkova	Bulgaria	11.65	
8	Laureen Beckles	France	11.70	

==== Semifinal 2 ====
Rank	Athlete	Nation	Time	Notes
1	Lyudmila Kondratyeva	Soviet Union	11.11	Q
2	Marlies Göhr	East Germany	11.18	Q
3	Linda Haglund	Sweden	11.36	Q
4	Chantal Réga	France	11.36	Q
5	Sonia Lannaman	Great Britain	11.38	
6	Natalya Bochina	Soviet Union	11.38	
7	Sofka Popova	Bulgaria	11.40	
8	Denise Boyd	Australia	11.44	

=== Final ===
The final was held on Saturday July 26, 1980.

Rank	Athlete	Nation	Time
1st place, gold medalist(s)	Lyudmila Kondratyeva	Soviet Union	11.06
2nd place, silver medalist(s)	Marlies Göhr	East Germany	11.07
3rd place, bronze medalist(s)	Ingrid Auerswald	East Germany	11.14
4	Linda Haglund	Sweden	11.16
5	Romy Müller	East Germany	11.16
6	Kathy Smallwood	Great Britain	11.28
7	Chantal Réga	France	11.32
8	Heather Hunte	Great Britain	11.34

== See also ==
- 1976 Women's Olympic 100 metres (Montreal)
- 1978 Women's European Championships 100 metres (Prague)
- 1982 Women's European Championships 100 metres (Athens)
- 1983 Women's World Championships 100 metres (Helsinki)
- 1984 Women's Olympic 100 metres (Los Angeles)
