= 1986 European Athletics Championships – Women's 200 metres =

Women's 200 metres at the European Athletics Championships

The women's 200 metres event at the 1986 European Athletics Championships was held in Stuttgart, then West Germany, at Neckarstadion on 28 and 29 August 1986.

== Medalists ==
Gold	Heike Drechsler; East Germany
Silver	Marie-Christine Cazier; France
Bronze	Silke Gladisch; East Germany

== Results ==
=== Final ===
29 August Wind: -0.8 m/s

Rank	Name	Nationality	Time	Notes
1st place, gold medalist(s)	Heike Drechsler	East Germany	21.71	=WR
2nd place, silver medalist(s)	Marie-Christine Cazier	France	22.32	NR
3rd place, bronze medalist(s)	Silke Gladisch	East Germany	22.49	
4	Marina Molokova	Soviet Union	22.71	
5	Ewa Kasprzyk	Poland	22.73	
6	Natalya Bochina	Soviet Union	22.87	
7	Sabine Günther	East Germany	22.98	
8	Marina Zhirova	Soviet Union	23.18	

=== Semi-finals ===
28 August

==== Semi-final 1 ====
Wind: 0.5 m/s

Rank	Name	Nationality	Time	Notes
1	Silke Gladisch	East Germany	22.29	Q
2	Marie-Christine Cazier	France	22.45	NR Q
3	Marina Zhirova	Soviet Union	22.93	Q
4	Sabine Günther	East Germany	22.93	Q
5	Kathy Cook	Great Britain	23.20	
6	Anke Köninger	West Germany	23.58	
7	Jolanta Janota	Poland	23.59	
8	Martha Grossenbacher	Netherlands	23.81	

==== Semi-final 2 ====
Wind: 0.3 m/s

Rank	Name	Nationality	Time	Notes
1	Heike Drechsler	East Germany	22.33	Q
2	Ewa Kasprzyk	Poland	22.60	Q
3	Marina Molokova	Soviet Union	22.61	Q
4	Natalya Bochina	Soviet Union	22.61	Q
5	Heather Oakes	Great Britain	22.92	
6	Claudia Lepping	West Germany	23.39	
7	Virginia Gomes	Portugal	24.44	
	Sandra Whittaker	Great Britain	DNS	

=== Heats ===
28 August

==== Heat 1 ====
Wind: -2.0 m/s

Rank	Name	Nationality	Time	Notes
1	Heather Oakes	Great Britain	23.01	Q
2	Silke Gladisch	East Germany	23.01	Q
3	Natalya Bochina	Soviet Union	23.21	Q
4	Claudia Lepping	West Germany	23.44	Q
5	Sølvi Olsen	Norway	24.46	

==== Heat 2 ====
Wind: -1.7 m/s

Rank	Name	Nationality	Time	Notes
1	Ewa Kasprzyk	Poland	23.11	Q
2	Marina Molokova	Soviet Union	23.17	Q
3	Sabine Günther	East Germany	23.24	Q
4	Sandra Whittaker	Great Britain	23.39	Q
5	Martha Grossenbacher	Netherlands	23.67	q

==== Heat 3 ====
Wind: -1.1 m/s

Rank	Name	Nationality	Time	Notes
1	Heike Drechsler	East Germany	22.52	Q
2	Marie-Christine Cazier	France	22.62	Q
3	Marina Zhirova	Soviet Union	23.11	Q
4	Kathy Cook	Great Britain	23.11	Q
5	Jolanta Janota	Poland	23.32	q
6	Anke Köninger	West Germany	23.70	q
7	Virginia Gomes	Portugal	24.38	q

== Participation ==
According to an unofficial count, 17 athletes from 9 countries participated in the event.

- East Germany (3)
- France (1)
- Great Britain (3)
- Netherlands (1)
- Norway (1)
- Poland (2)
- Portugal (1)
- Soviet Union (3)
- West Germany (2)
