= Gisela Kinzel =

German sprinter (born 1961)

Medal record

Women's athletics

Representing West Germany

European Championships
Silver medal – second place	1986 Stuttgart	4×400 m

Gisela Kinzel (née Gottwald; born 17 May 1961 in Kirchhellen) is a retired athlete who represented West Germany.

She specialized in 400 metres, and competed for the clubs VfL Gladbeck and SC Eintracht Hamm.

== Competition Results ==
Her biggest success came in 4 × 400 metres relay at the 1986 European Championships, where she won the silver medal, with the West German national team.

The team consisted of Gisela Kinzel, Ute Thimm, Heidi-Elke Gaugel and Gaby Bußmann.

In addition she helped finish sixth at the 1983 World Championships.

She was fifth at the 1987 World Championships.

She ran in the heats at the 1988 Summer Olympics.

Kinzel won a silver medal for the 400 metre category at the 1987 European Indoor Championships.

== Doping ==
Hans-Jörg Kinzel, Gisela's husband and coach, admitted to administering steroids to his wife.
