= Athletics at the 1980 Summer Olympics – Women's 4 × 100 metres relay =

Women's 4 × 100 metres relay at the Games of the XXII Olympiad
- Venue: Grand Arena of the Central Lenin Stadium
- Dates: 1 August 1980 (final)
- Competitors: 32 from 8 nations
- Winning time: 41.60 WR

Medalists
1st place, gold medalist(s)		Romy Müller, Bärbel Wöckel, Ingrid Auerswald, Marlies Göhr	East Germany
2nd place, silver medalist(s)		Vera Komisova, Lyudmila Maslakova, Vera Anisimova, Natalya Bochina	Soviet Union
3rd place, bronze medalist(s)		Heather Hunte, Kathy Smallwood, Beverley Goddard, Sonia Lannaman	Great Britain

These are the official results of the women's 4 × 100 m relay event at the 1980 Summer Olympics in Moscow, Soviet Union. Only 8 teams competed, thus there were no heats. The final was held on August 1, 1980.

== Records ==
These were the standing World and Olympic records (in seconds) prior to the 1980 Summer Olympics.

World record	41.85	(East Germany) Romy Müller (East Germany) Bärbel Wöckel (East Germany) Ingrid Auerswald (East Germany) Marlies Göhr	Potsdam (GDR)	July 13, 1980
Olympic record	42.55	(East Germany) Marlies Oelsner (East Germany) Renate Stecher (East Germany) Carla Bodendorf (East Germany) Bärbel Eckert	Montreal (CAN)	July 31, 1976

== Final ==
- Held on Friday August 1, 1980

RANK	NATION	ATHLETES	TIME
Gold medal	East Germany	• Romy Müller • Bärbel Wöckel • Ingrid Auerswald • Marlies Göhr	41.60
Silver medal	Soviet Union	• Vera Komisova • Lyudmila Maslakova • Vera Anisimova • Natalya Bochina	42.10
Bronze medal	Great Britain	• Heather Hunte • Kathy Smallwood • Beverley Goddard • Sonia Lannaman	42.43
4.	Bulgaria	• Sofka Popova • Liliana Panaiotova • Maria Shishkova • Galina Encheva	42.67
5.	France	• Veronique Grandrieux • Chantal Réga • Raymonde Naigre • Emma Sulter	42.84
6.	Jamaica	• Leleith Hodges • Jacqueline Pusey • Rose Allwood • Merlene Ottey	43.19
7.	Poland	• Lucyna Langer • Elzbieta Stachurska • Zofia Bielczyk • Grażyna Rabsztyn	44.49
–	Sweden	• Linda Haglund • Lena Möller • Ann-Louise Skoglund • Helena Pihl	DNF

== See also ==
- 1982 Women's European Championships 4 × 100 m Relay (Athens)
