= 1984 European Athletics Indoor Championships – Women's 200 metres =

Women's sprint championship

The women's 200 metres event at the 1984 European Athletics Indoor Championships was held on 3 and 4 March.

== Medalists ==
Gold	Silver	Bronze
Jarmila Kratochvílová; Czechoslovakia	Marie-Christine Cazier; France	Olga Antonova; Soviet Union

== Results ==
=== Heats ===
The winner of each heat (Q) and the next 4 fastest (q) qualified for the semifinals.

Rank	Heat	Name	Nationality	Time	Notes
1	2	Jarmila Kratochvílová	Czechoslovakia	23.63	Q
2	4	Ewa Kasprzyk	Poland	23.65	Q
3	2	Olga Antonova	Soviet Union	23.66	q
4	3	Marie-Christine Cazier	France	23.98	Q
5	4	Els Vader	Netherlands	24.05	q
6	3	Elżbieta Woźniak	Poland	24.13	q
7	4	Stepanka Sokolová	Czechoslovakia	24.18	q
8	1	Semra Aksu	Turkey	24.52	Q
9	2	Elizabet Pantazis	Greece	24.59	
10	1	Anelia Nuneva	Bulgaria	24.69	
11	3	Susanna Bergman	Sweden	24.77	
12	3	Sibel Tercan	Turkey	25.18	
13	1	Pia Engström	Sweden	25.19	

=== Semifinals ===
First 2 from each semifinal qualified directly (Q) for the final.

Rank	Heat	Name	Nationality	Time	Notes
1	1	Jarmila Kratochvílová	Czechoslovakia	23.57	Q
2	2	Olga Antonova	Soviet Union	23.82	Q
3	1	Marie-Christine Cazier	France	23.87	Q
4	1	Elżbieta Woźniak	Poland	23.89	
5	2	Els Vader	Netherlands	24.15	Q
	1	Semra Aksu	Turkey	DQ	
	2	Stepanka Sokolová	Czechoslovakia	DQ	
	2	Ewa Kasprzyk	Poland	DNS	

=== Final ===
Rank	Name	Nationality	Time	Notes
1st place, gold medalist(s)	Jarmila Kratochvílová	Czechoslovakia	23.02	
2nd place, silver medalist(s)	Marie-Christine Cazier	France	23.68	
3rd place, bronze medalist(s)	Olga Antonova	Soviet Union	23.80	
	Els Vader	Netherlands	DNS	
