= 1983 European Athletics Indoor Championships – Women's 200 metres =

The women's 200 metres event at the 1983 European Athletics Indoor Championships was held on 5 March.

== Medalists ==
Gold	Silver	Bronze
Marita Koch; East Germany	Joan Baptiste; Great Britain	Christina Sussiek; West Germany

== Results ==
=== Heats ===
First 2 from each heat (Q) and the next 1 fastest (q) qualified for the final.

Rank	Heat	Name	Nationality	Time	Notes
1	1	Marita Koch	East Germany	23.12	Q
2	1	Joan Baptiste	Great Britain	23.48	Q
3	1	Raisa Makhova	Soviet Union	23.55	q
4	2	Christina Sussiek	West Germany	23.82	Q
5	2	Els Vader	Netherlands	24.08	Q
6	2	Renata Černochová	Czechoslovakia	24.15	
7	2	Ezsébet Juhász	Hungary	24.21	
8	1	Susanna Bergman	Sweden	24.76	
9	1	Semra Aksu	Turkey	25.04	

=== Final ===
Rank	Lane	Name	Nationality	Time	Notes
1st place, gold medalist(s)	3	Marita Koch	East Germany	22.39	WB
2nd place, silver medalist(s)	4	Joan Baptiste	Great Britain	23.37	
3rd place, bronze medalist(s)	2	Christina Sussiek	West Germany	23.61	
4	5	Els Vader	Netherlands	23.64	
	1	Raisa Makhova	Soviet Union	DNF	
