= 1988 East German Indoor Athletics Championships =

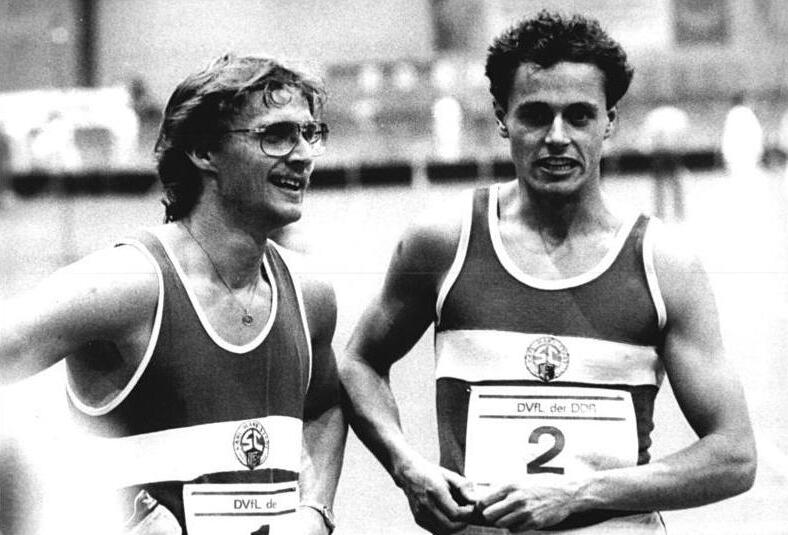
- Thomas Schönlebe and Jens Carlowitz at the championships
- Dates: 26–27 February 1988
- Host city: Senftenberg
- Venue: Sporthalle Aktivist
- Events: 29

The 1988 East German Indoor Athletics Championships was the 25th edition of the national championship in indoor track and field for East Germany. It was held on 26–27 February at the Sporthalle Aktivist in Senftenberg. A total of 29 events (16 for men and 13 for women) were contested over the two-day competition.

== Results ==
=== Men ===
Event	Gold		Silver		Bronze	
60 metres	Sven Matthes; SC Dynamo Berlin	6.66 s	Steffen Bringmann; SC DHfK Leipzig	6.68 s	Steffen Lassler; SC Chemie Halle	6.76 s
100 yards	Steffen Bringmann; SC DHfK Leipzig	9.54 s	Sven Matthes; SC Dynamo Berlin	9.60 s	Thomas Schröder; SC Neubrandenburg	9.72 s
200 metres	Steffen Lassler; SC Chemie Halle	21.27 s	Matthias Schober; SC Turbine Erfurt	21.89 s	Holger Conrad; SC Einheit Dresden	22.06 s
400 metres	Thomas Schönlebe; SC Karl-Marx-Stadt	46.31 s	Jens Carlowitz; SC Karl-Marx-Stadt	46.32 s	Torsten Odebrett; SC Turbine Erfurt	47.93 s
800 metres	Jürgen Herms; SC Einheit Dresden	1:50.11 min	Jens Behmer; SC Neubrandenburg	1:50.33 min	Kesseler; SC DHfK Leipzig	1:50.95 min
1500 metres	Rüdiger Horn; ASK Vorwärts Potsdam	3:40.08 min	Thorsten Lenhardt; SC Turbine Erfurt	3:42.24 min	Hähne; SC DHfK Leipzig	3:49.83 min
3000 metres	Maik Dreißigacker; SC Dynamo Berlin	8:03.13 min	Jens-Peter Herold; ASK Vorwärts Potsdam	8:03.88 min	Thorsten Lenhardt; SC Turbine Erfurt	8:04.92 min
5000 metres	Hagen Melzer; SC Einheit Dresden	13:51.77 min	Frank Heine; ASK Vorwärts Potsdam	13:52.47 min	Heiner Mebes; SC Magdeburg	13:54.49 min
60 metres hurdles	Andreas Oschkenat; SC Dynamo Berlin	7.74 s	Cheick-Idriss Gonschinska; SC DHfK Leipzig	7.88 s	Jörg Rölz; SC Neubrandenburg	7.93 s
10,000 m walk	Ronald Weigel; ASK Vorwärts Potsdam	38:51.64 min	Hartwig Gauder; SC Turbine Erfurt	39:13.15 min	Axel Noack; TSC Berlin	40:27.64 min
High jump	Carsten Siebert; SC Cottbus	2.24 m	Gerd Wessig; SC Traktor Schwerin	2.21 m	Mathias Grebenstein; SC Motor Jena	2.18 m
Pole vault	Christoph Pietz; SC Dynamo Berlin	5.40 m	Marco Schröder; ASK Vorwärts Potsdam	5.20 m	Rainer Lewin; ASK Vorwärts Potsdam	5.10 m
Long jump	Ron Beer; SC Dynamo Berlin	7.70 m	Andre Reichelt; SC Einheit Dresden	7.57 m	Karsten Embach; ASK Vorwärts Potsdam	7.49 m
Triple jump	Dirk Gamlin; SC Traktor Schwerin	16.28 m	Thomas Rex; SC Turbine Erfurt	15.75 m	Andre Ernst; SC Chemie Halle	15.69 m
Shot put	Ulf Timmermann; TSC Berlin	21.20 m	Klaus Görmer; SC DHfK Leipzig	19.76 m	Torsten Pelzer; ASK Vorwärts Potsdam	19.68 m
Pentathlon	André Preysing; SC DHfK Leipzig	6705 pts	Uwe Freimuth; ASK Vorwärts Potsdam	6609 pts	René Günther; SC Chemie Halle	6317 pts

=== Women ===
Event	Gold		Silver		Bronze	
60 metres	Silke Möller; SC Empor Rostock	7.07 s	Marlies Göhr; SC Motor Jena	7.13 s	Ingrid Auerswald; SC Motor Jena	7.19 s
100 yards	Silke Möller; SC Empor Rostock	10.21 s	Marlies Göhr; SC Motor Jena	10.38 s	Kerstin Behrendt; SC DHfK Leipzig	10.58 s
200 metres	Ingrid Auerswald; SC Motor Jena	23.05 s	Sabine Günther; SC Motor Jena	23.51 s	Heike Morgenstern; ASK Vorwärts Potsdam	23.95 s
400 metres	Petra Müller; SC Chemie Halle	50.80 s	Dagmar Neubauer; SC Turbine Erfurt	51.13 s	Cornelia Ullrich; SC Magdeburg	52.86 s
800 metres	Christine Wachtel; SC Neubrandenburg	2:00.63 min	Ute Schmidt; SC Chemie Halle	2:06.28 min	Darja Strohbach; SC Neubrandenburg	2:09.28 min
1500 metres	Birgit Barth; SC Dynamo Berlin	4:10.07 min	Andrea Hahmann; ASK Vorwärts Potsdam	4:10.53 min	Yvonne Grabner; SC Karl-Marx-Stadt	4:11.68 min
3000 metres	Kathrin Ullrich; SC Dynamo Berlin	9:04.99 min	Yvonne Grabner; SC Karl-Marx-Stadt	9:08.13 min	Gabriele Veith; SC Cottbus	9:08.25 min
60 m hurdles	Cornelia Oschkenat; SC Dynamo Berlin	7.82 s	Heike Theele; SC Magdeburg	8.05 s	Kristin Patzwahl; SC DHfK Leipzig	8.20 s
5000 m walk	Beate Anders; TSC Berlin	22:14.93 min	Ines Estedt; SC Dynamo Berlin	23:07.98 min	Ulla Klaedtke; ASK Vorwärts Potsdam	23:44.18 min
High jump	Gabriele Günz; SC DHfK Leipzig	1.94 m	Ute Seidler; SC Chemie Halle	1.80 m	Britta Vörös; SC Motor Jena	1.80 m
Long jump	Heike Drechsler; SC Motor Jena	6.94 m	Helga Radtke; SC Empor Rostock	6.76 m	Gaby Ehlert; SC DHfK Leipzig	6.33 m
Shot put	Kathrin Neimke; SC Magdeburg	20.70 m	Ilona Briesenick; SC Dynamo Berlin	20.19 m	Grit Hammer; SC Motor Jena	18.36 m
Pentathlon	Anke Behmer; SC Neubrandenburg	4995 pts	Heike Tischler; SC Motor Jena	4702 pts	Ines Schulz; SC Karl-Marx-Stadt	4632 pts
