= Romy Müller =

East German sprinter

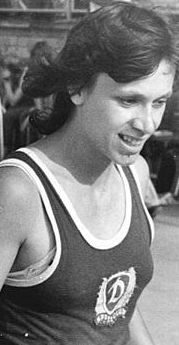
- Müller in 1977

Personal information
- Born: Romy Schneider; 26 July 1958 (age 67) Lübbenau, Bezirk Cottbus, East Germany
- Height: 168 cm (5 ft 6 in)
- Weight: 59 kg (130 lb)

Sport
- Sport: Athletics
- Club: SC Dynamo Berlin
Medal record
Women's athletics
Representing East Germany
Olympic Games
Gold medal – first place	1980 Moscow	4 × 100 metres
European Cup
Gold medal – first place	European Cup 1977	4 × 100 metres
Gold medal – first place	European Cup 1979	4 × 100 metres
World Cup
Silver medal – second place	World Cup 1977	4 × 100 metres
Silver medal – second place	World Cup 1979	4 × 100 metres

Romy Müller (née Schneider; born 26 July 1958 in Lübbenau, Bezirk Cottbus) is a German athlete who competed mainly in the 100 metres and for the SC Dynamo Berlin and the Sportvereinigung Dynamo.

== Biography ==
She competed for East Germany in the 1980 Summer Olympics held in Moscow, Russia in the 4 × 100 metres where she won the gold medal with her team mates Bärbel Wöckel, 100 m bronze medalist Ingrid Auerswald and 100 m silver medalist Marlies Göhr.

== See also ==
- German all-time top lists – 100 metres
