= Trần Thanh Vân =

Trần Thanh Vân may refer to:

- Trần Thanh Vân (athlete)
- Trần Thanh Vân (physicist)
