= Sherri Howard =

American athlete (born 1962)

Personal information
- Nationality: United States
- Born: June 1, 1962 (age 64) Sherman, Texas, U.S.
- Height: 5 ft 7 in (1.70 m)
- Weight: 120 lb (54 kg)

Sport
- Sport: Running
- Event: Sprints
- College team: Cal State Los Angeles Golden Eagles, UCLA Bruins
- Club: Puma and Energizer Track Club/Tyson
Medal record
Women's athletics
Representing United States
Olympic Games
Gold medal – first place	1984 Los Angeles	4 × 400 m relay
Silver medal – second place	1988 Seoul	4 × 400 m relay
- Updated on 6 May 2012

Sherri Frances Howard (born June 1, 1962) is an American former athlete who competed mainly in the 400 metres. She is the older sister of 1988 relay teammate Denean Howard.

She competed in the 1980 Olympic trials in the 400 m at the age of 16, in which she, along with her sister Denean, 14, became the first two sisters to make an Olympic team in the same event for the United States, placing first and third respectively. Although the Olympic trials were held, President Jimmy Carter boycotted the Olympics for political reasons. The 1980 Olympic Team is considered to many the forgotten team. However being high schoolers at the time, they both continued competing, making the team once again in the 1984 Summer Olympics held in Los Angeles, United States in the 4 × 400 metres where she won the gold medal with her teammates Lillie Leatherwood, 200 m and 400 m gold medalist Valerie Brisco-Hooks and 400 m silver medalist Chandra Cheesborough. Her sister ran in the early rounds and also received a gold medal. Within the next four year, this situation would be reversed. Sherri earned a silver medal in the 1988 Summer Olympics held in Seoul, South Korea as a member of the United States 4 × 400 meters relay team, where she ran in the early rounds but not the final, while her sister ran the final on the second fastest 4 × 400 relay team ever (surpassed only but the Soviet team who won the race).

Sherri Howard and her three sisters gained fame in 1979 when the four of them teamed up to set the still standing National High School record in the 4 × 440 yard relay for San Gorgonio High School in San Bernardino. That distance was obsoleted shortly thereafter by the NFHS, but also qualified for the record of the replacement 4 × 400 metres relay. Later that record was broken by teams including some of the younger sisters, then at Kennedy High School (Los Angeles). Sherri was the California High School Athlete of the Year at Kennedy in 1980. Also in 1980 she was named the national Girl's "High School Athlete of the Year" by Track and Field News. She set the still standing NFHS national high school records in the 440 yard dash at 53.65. The federation converted record-keeping to metric distances shortly afterward. Sister Denean set the metric record that stood for 18 years.

Sherri won the 1985 NCAA Championship for California State University, Los Angeles. She was elected into that school's Hall of Fame in 1992.

== Later accomplishments ==
Sherri Howard is featured on the cover of the Spring 2007 catalog for Purity Products, an American vitamin company. She is pursuing an acting career, including the role of Queen Isis in The Scorpion King. Currently, she is not only an actress, model, motivational speaker and commentator, but also a personal trainer, helping numerous kids excel in their goals as well as their future endeavours.
