= Els Vader =

Dutch sprinter (1959–2021)

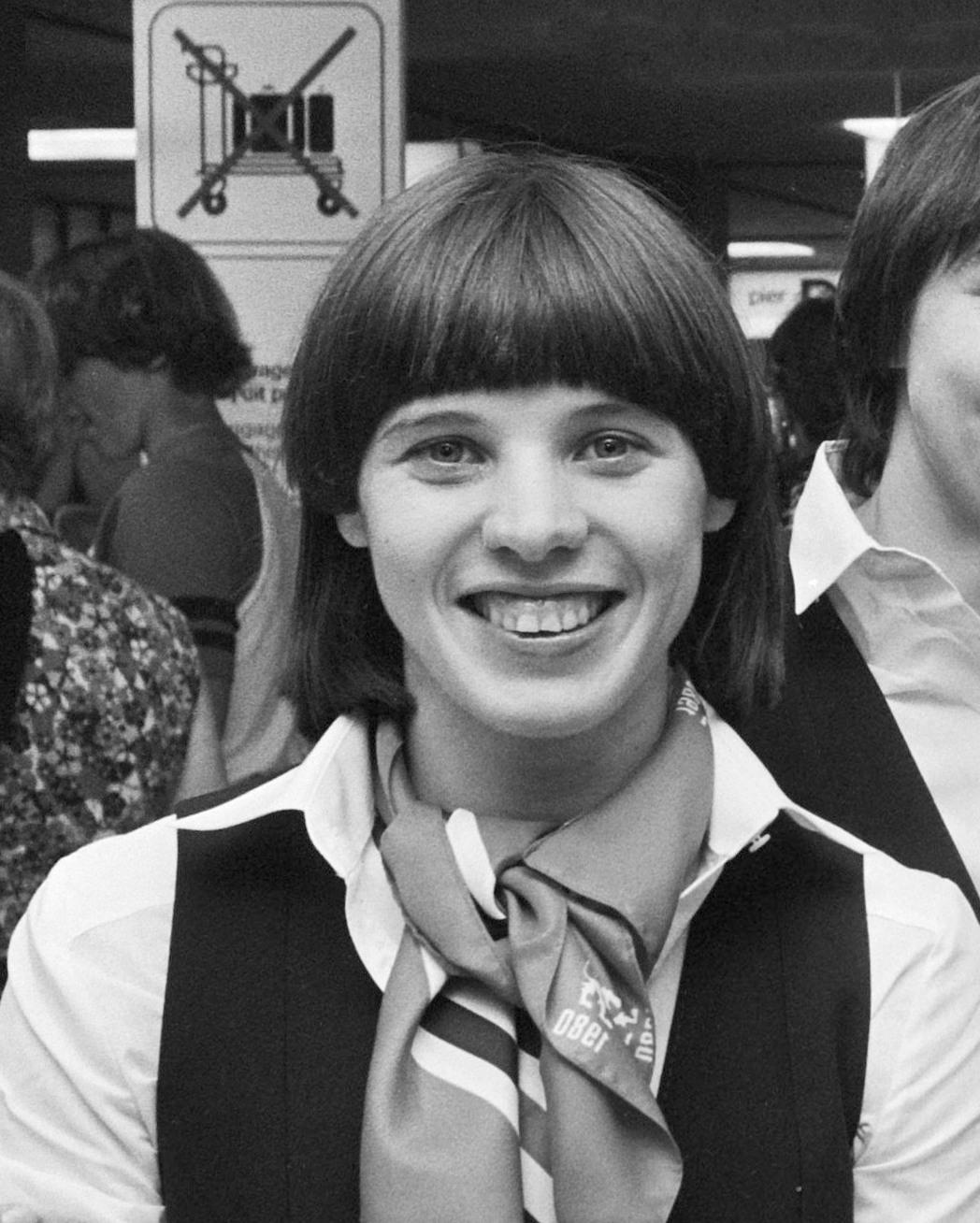
- Els Vader in 1980

Personal information
- Born: 24 September 1959 Vlissingen, the Netherlands
- Died: 8 February 2021 (aged 61)
- Height: 1.62 m (5 ft 4 in)
- Weight: 52 kg (115 lb)

Sport
- Sport: Sprint
- Club: Zeeland Sport, Vlissingen
Medal record
Representing the Netherlands
European Indoor Championships
Bronze medal – third place	1985 Athens	200 m

Elisabeth Cornelia "Els" Vader (married Scharn) (24 September 1959 – 8 February 2021) was a track and field sprinter from the Netherlands. She competed at the 1980, 1984 and 1988 Summer Olympics in the 100 m, 200 m and 4 × 100 m relay (in 1988 only), but failed to reach the finals in any event.

Vader was Holland's leading sprinter in the 1980s, alongside Nelli Cooman. Altogether she gathered 23 national championships in the various outdoor and indoor sprint events. She won the bronze medal in the women's 200 metres at the 1985 European Indoor Championships.

She was married to former athlete and coach Haico Scharn.

She died from major duodenal papilla cancer.

== International competitions ==
Representing the Netherlands
Year	Competition	Venue	Position	Event	Notes
1977	European Junior Championships	Donetsk, Soviet Union	11th (sf)	100 m	12.11
1977	European Junior Championships	Donetsk, Soviet Union	6th	200 m	24.34
1977	European Junior Championships	Donetsk, Soviet Union	4th	4 × 100 m relay	46.20
1979	European Indoor Championships	Vienna, Austria	17th (h)	60 m	7.57
1979	Universiade	Mexico City, Mexico	5th (sf)	100 m	11.76
1980	Olympic Games	Moscow, Soviet Union	17th (h)	100 m	11.61^{1}
1980	Olympic Games	Moscow, Soviet Union	16th (sf)	200 m	23.44
1982	European Indoor Championships	Milan, Italy	7th (sf)	60 m	7.34
1982	European Indoor Championships	Milan, Italy	4th	200 m	23.87
1983	European Indoor Championships	Budapest, Hungary	4th	200 m	23.64
1983	World Championships	Helsinki, Finland	17th (qf)	100 m	11.56
1984	European Indoor Championships	Gothenburg, Sweden	5th (h)	60 m	7.41^{2}
1984	European Indoor Championships	Gothenburg, Sweden	5th (sf)	200 m	24.15^{2}
1984	Olympic Games	Los Angeles, United States	13th (qf)	100 m	11.56
1984	Olympic Games	Los Angeles, United States	15th (sf)	200 m	23.43
1985	European Indoor Championships	Piraeus, Greece	5th	60 m	7.25
1985	European Indoor Championships	Piraeus, Greece	3rd	200 m	23.64
1986	European Championships	Stuttgart, West Germany	8th (h)	100 m	11.30^{3}
1986	European Championships	Stuttgart, West Germany	7th	4 × 100 m relay	44.38
1987	European Indoor Championships	Liévin, France	4th	60 m	7.19
1987	World Indoor Championships	Indianapolis, United States	6th	60 m	7.23
1987	World Indoor Championships	Indianapolis, United States	8th (sf)	200 m	23.78
1988	European Indoor Championships	Budapest, Hungary	6th (sf)	60 m	7.23
1988	European Indoor Championships	Budapest, Hungary	8th (h)	200 m	23.68^{4}
1988	Olympic Games	Seoul, South Korea	26th (qf)	100 m	11.51
1988	Olympic Games	Seoul, South Korea	8th (sf)	4 × 100 m relay	43.48

^{1}Did not finish in the quarterfinals
^{2}Did not start in the final
^{3}Disqualified in the semifinals
^{4}Did not start in the semifinals

Awards
Preceded by Sylvia Barlag	KNAU Cup; 1981	Succeeded by Carla Beurskens
