= Jörg Naumann =

German former track and field hurdler (born 1963)

Jörg Naumann (born 2 January 1963) is a German former track and field hurdler who competed for East Germany. He was a bronze medallist at the 1985 IAAF World Cup, helping the East German men to third in the team competition. He won the 60 metres indoor national title at the East German Indoor Athletics Championships in 1982.

== International competitions ==
Year	Competition	Venue	Position	Event	Notes
1985	IAAF World Cup	Canberra, Australia	3rd	110 m hurdles	13.76w

== National titles ==
- East German Indoor Athletics Championships
  - 60 m hurdles: 1982
