= 1982 European Athletics Championships – Women's 4 × 100 metres relay =

Women's 4 × 100 metres relay at the European Athletics Championships

These are the official results of the Women's 4 × 100 metres event at the 1982 European Championships in Athens, Greece. The final was held at Olympic Stadium "Spiros Louis" on 11 September 1982.

== Medalists ==
Gold	Gesine Walther; Bärbel Wöckel; Sabine Günther; Marlies Göhr; East Germany
Silver	Wendy Hoyte; Kathy Smallwood; Bev Callender; Shirley Thomas; United Kingdom
Bronze	Laurence Bily; Marie-Christine Cazier; Rose-Aimée Bacoul; Liliane Gaschet; France

== Results ==
=== Final ===
11 September

Rank	Nation	Competitors	Time	Notes
1st place, gold medalist(s)	East Germany	Gesine Walther; Bärbel Wöckel; Sabine Günther; Marlies Göhr	42.19	CR
2nd place, silver medalist(s)	United Kingdom	Wendy Hoyte; Kathy Smallwood; Bev Callender; Shirley Thomas	42.66	
3rd place, bronze medalist(s)	France	Laurence Bily; Marie-Christine Cazier; Rose-Aimée Bacoul; Liliane Gaschet	42.69	
4	Bulgaria	Anelia Nuneva; Nadezhda Georgieva; Yordanka Donkova; Sofka Popova	43.10	
5	Soviet Union	Tatyana Anisimova; Irina Olkhovnikova; Yelena Kelchevskaya; Lyudmila Kondratyeva	43.39	
6	Italy	Daniela Ferrian; Carla Mercurio; Marisa Masullo; Erika Rossi	43.99	
	Czechoslovakia	Štěpánka Sokolová; Radislava Šoborová; Taťána Kocembová; Jarmila Kratochvílová	DNF	

== Participation ==
According to an unofficial count, 28 athletes from 7 countries participated in the event.

- Bulgaria (4)
- Czechoslovakia (4)
- East Germany (4)
- France (4)
- Italy (4)
- Soviet Union (4)
- United Kingdom (4)

== See also ==
- 1978 Women's European Championships 4 × 100 m Relay (Prague)
- 1980 Women's Olympic 4 × 100 m Relay (Moscow)
- 1983 Women's World Championships 4 × 100 m Relay (Helsinki)
- 1984 Women's Olympic 4 × 100 m Relay (Los Angeles)
- 1986 Women's European Championships 4 × 100 m Relay (Stuttgart)
- 1987 Women's World Championships 4 × 100 m Relay (Rome)
- 1988 Women's Olympic 4 × 100 m Relay (Seoul)
- 1990 Women's European Championships 4 × 100 m Relay (Split)
