= 1985 European Athletics Indoor Championships – Women's 200 metres =

The women's 200 metres event at the 1985 European Athletics Indoor Championships was held on 2 and 3 March.

== Medalists ==
Gold	Silver	Bronze
Marita Koch; East Germany	Kirsten Emmelmann; East Germany	Els Vader; Netherlands

== Results ==
=== Heats ===
First 2 from each heat (Q) and the next 4 fastest (q) qualified for the semifinals.

Rank	Heat	Name	Nationality	Time	Notes
1	2	Marita Koch	East Germany	23.61	Q
2	2	Joan Baptiste	Great Britain	23.88	Q
3	1	Kirsten Emmelmann	East Germany	23.95	Q
4	3	Els Vader	Netherlands	23.99	Q
5	1	Sølvi Olsen	Norway	24.38	Q
6	1	Ann-Louise Skoglund	Sweden	24.48	q
7	3	Daniela Ferrian	Italy	24.51	Q
8	3	Maria Fernström	Sweden	24.62	q
9	2	Mercedes Cano	Spain	24.89	q
10	1	Cristina Pérez	Spain	24.95	q
11	2	Susanna Bergman	Sweden	25.08	
12	3	Josiane Reinesch	Luxembourg	25.17	
	1	Saša Kranjc	Yugoslavia	DNF	

=== Semifinals ===
First 2 from each semifinal (Q) and the next 1 fastest (q) qualified for the final.

Rank	Heat	Name	Nationality	Time	Notes
1	2	Marita Koch	East Germany	23.09	Q
2	1	Kirsten Emmelmann	East Germany	23.38	Q
3	1	Joan Baptiste	Great Britain	23.48	Q
4	2	Els Vader	Netherlands	23.73	Q
5	1	Ann-Louise Skoglund	Sweden	24.09	q
6	1	Daniela Ferrian	Italy	24.15	
7	2	Mercedes Cano	Spain	24.31	
8	2	Sølvi Olsen	Norway	24.34	
9	2	Maria Fernström	Sweden	24.41	
10	1	Cristina Pérez	Spain	24.52	

=== Final ===
Rank	Lane	Name	Nationality	Time	Notes
1st place, gold medalist(s)	3	Marita Koch	East Germany	22.82	
2nd place, silver medalist(s)	4	Kirsten Emmelmann	East Germany	23.06	
3rd place, bronze medalist(s)	1	Els Vader	Netherlands	23.64	
4	2	Joan Baptiste	Great Britain	23.67	
5	5	Ann-Louise Skoglund	Sweden	24.00	
