= Oguzoeme Nsenu =

Nigerian sprinter

Personal information
- Nationality: Nigerian
- Born: 5 March 1958 (age 68)

Sport
- Sport: Sprinting
- Event: 100 metres
Medal record
Women's athletics
Representing Nigeria
African Championships
Gold medal – first place	1979 Dakar	100 m
Silver medal – second place	1979 Dakar	4×100 m

Oguzoeme Nsenu (born 5 March 1958) is a Nigerian sprinter. She competed in the women's 100 metres at the 1980 Summer Olympics.
