= Ewa Kasprzyk (athlete) =

Polish sprinter

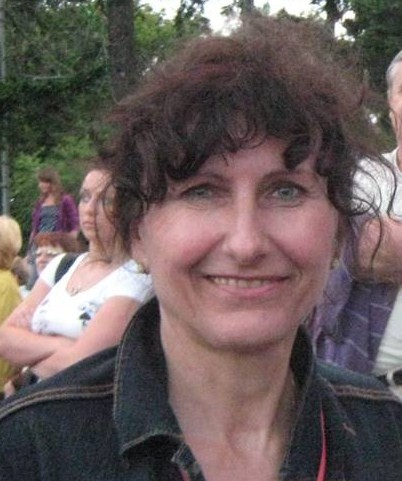
- Ewa Kasprzyk in 2010

Personal information
- Nationality: Polish
- Born: 7 September 1957 (age 68) Poznań, Poland
- Height: 1.64 m (5 ft 5 in)
- Weight: 53 kg (117 lb)

Sport
- Sport: Athletics
- Event(s): 100 m, 200 m
Medal record
Representing Poland
Women's athletics
European Championships
Bronze medal – third place	1986 Stuttgart	4 × 400 m
European Indoor Championships
Gold medal – first place	1988 Budapest	200 m
Silver medal – second place	1986 Madrid	200 m
Summer Universiade
Bronze medal – third place	1977 Sofia	4 x 100 m

Ewa Kasprzyk née Witkowska (Polish pronunciation: [ˈeva ˈkaspʂɨk]; born 7 September 1957) is a retired Polish sprinter who competed primarily in the 200 metres. She represented her country at the first two editions of the World Championships, in 1983 and 1987, reaching the final both times.

She is the Polish record holder in 100 and 200 metres.

== International competitions ==
Year	Competition	Venue	Position	Event	Notes
1975	European Junior Championships	Athens, Greece	5th	200 m	24.18
1975	European Junior Championships	Athens, Greece	2nd	4 × 100 m	44.93
1977	Universiade	Sofia, Bulgaria	6th	200 m	24.12
1977	Universiade	Sofia, Bulgaria	3rd	4 × 100 m	44.79
1983	World Championships	Helsinki, Finland	8th	200 m	23.03
1984	European Indoor Championships	Gothenburg, Sweden	2nd (h)	200 m	23.65^{1}
1984	Friendship Games	Prague, Czechoslovakia	6th	200 m	23.14
1984	Friendship Games	Prague, Czechoslovakia	4th	4 × 100 m	43.43
1985	World Cup	Canberra, Australia	4th	200 m	23.05^{2}
1986	European Indoor Championships	Madrid, Spain	2nd	200 m	22.96
1986	Goodwill Games	Moscow, Soviet Union	2nd	200 m	22.13
1986	European Championships	Stuttgart, West Germany	5th	200 m	22.73
1986	European Championships	Stuttgart, West Germany	6th	4 × 100 m	43.54
1986	European Championships	Stuttgart, West Germany	3rd	4 × 400 m	3:24.65
1987	World Championships	Rome, Italy	7th	200 m	22.52
1988	European Indoor Championships	Budapest, Hungary	1st	200 m	22.69

^{1}Did not start in the semifinals
^{2}Representing Europe

== Personal bests ==
Outdoors

- 100 m 10.93 (Grudziądz 1986)
- 200 m 22.13 (Moscow 1986)
- 400 m 51.30 (1986)

Indoors

- 60 m 7.26 (1988)
- 200 m 22.69 (Budapest 1988)
