= Dana Wright =

Canadian hurdler

Personal information
- Born: 20 September 1959 (age 66) Toronto, Ontario, Canada

Sport
- Country: Canada
- Sport: Women's athletics
Medal record
Olympic Games
Silver medal – second place	1984 Los Angeles	4×400 m relay

Dana Wright (born 20 September 1959) is a Canadian former track and field athlete who competed in the 400 metres hurdles. She had personal bests of 57.35 seconds for the hurdles and 53.14 for the 400 metres sprint.

Born in Toronto, Ontario, she attended and competed for Old Dominion University. She placed third in the 400 m hurdles at the Canadian Athletics Championships in 1982, 1984 and 1985, with her best finish at the national level coming in 1987, when she was runner-up to Gwen Wall.

She gained selection for both the hurdles and as the alternate heats runner for the Canadian 4×400 metres relay at the 1984 Olympic Games. She was eliminated in the qualifying rounds of the hurdles but helped the relay team into the final of the competition. Molly Killingbeck replaced her in the final and Canada won the silver medal in Wright's absence. She was a hurdles finalist at the 1987 Pan American Games (coming seventh) but this was her final international appearance and she retired from the sport soon after.
