= Denean Howard =

American sprinter (born 1964)

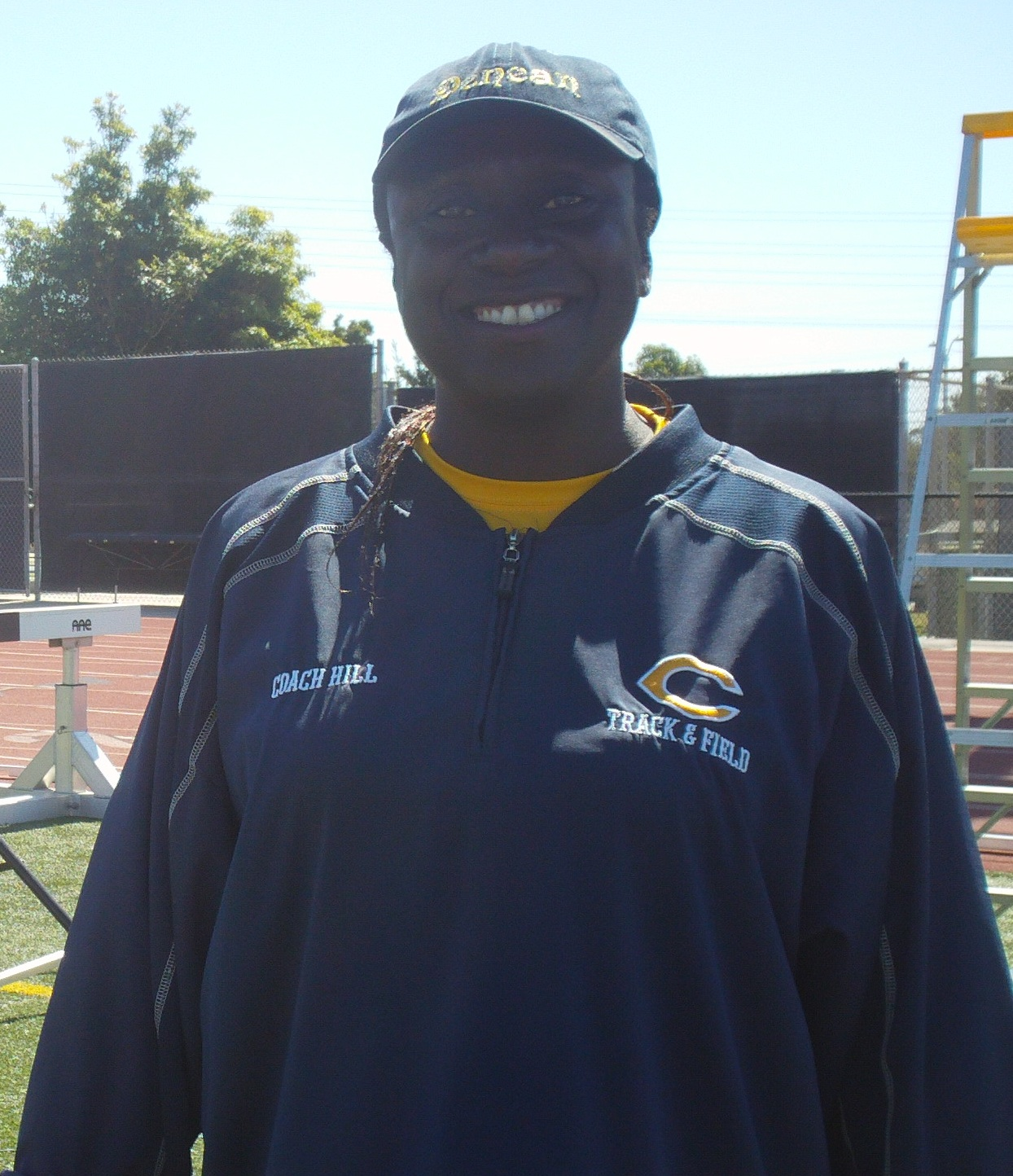

Personal information
- Nationality: United States
- Born: October 5, 1964 (age 62) Sherman, Texas, U.S.
- Height: 5 ft 4.5 in (1.64 m)
- Weight: 121 lb (55 kg)

Sport
- Sport: Running
- Event: Sprints
- College team: Cal State Los Angeles Golden Eagles
- Club: Puma and Energizer Track Club/Tyson
Medal record
Women's athletics
Representing the United States
Olympic Games
Gold medal – first place	1984 Los Angeles	4 × 400 m relay
Silver medal – second place	1988 Seoul	4 × 400 m relay
Silver medal – second place	1992 Barcelona	4 × 400 m relay
World Championships
Bronze medal – third place	1987 Rome	4 × 400 m relay
Pan American Games
Gold medal – first place	1987 Indianapolis	4 × 400 m relay
Bronze medal – third place	1987 Indianapolis	400 metres
Summer Universiade
Gold medal – first place	1987 Zagreb	400 metres
Gold medal – first place	1987 Zagreb	4 x 400 m relay
- Updated on 19 May 2016

Denean Elizabeth Howard-Hill (born October 5, 1964) is an American athlete who competed mainly in the 400 metres.

== Career ==
She competed for the United States, winning a gold medal at the 1984 Summer Olympics held in Los Angeles as a member of the 4 × 400 metres relay team, running in the preliminary rounds with her sister Sherri running in the final. It was a reversal at the 1988 Summer Olympics held in Seoul, South Korea in the 4 × 400 metres relay, where both sisters won the silver medal, but Denean ran in the final with her teammates Diane Dixon, Valerie Brisco-Hooks and Florence Griffith Joyner. The team set the current standing American Record in the event, which is still the second best time ever run behind the winning Soviet team in that race.

She is married to boxer, Virgil Hill; her son Virgil was drafted by the St. Louis Cardinals in the sixth round of the 2009 MLB Draft, currently playing for the Class-A Batavia Muckdogs.

Denean Howard and her three sisters gained fame in 1979 when the four of them teamed up to set the National High School record in the 4 × 440 yard relay for San Gorgonio High School in San Bernardino. That distance is now rarely run as the NFHS converted to metric distances, so the record still stands. Later teams with Denean broke the record for the slightly shorter 4 × 400 metres relay, after sister Atra graduated and the rest of the family moved to Kennedy High School (Los Angeles). Denean was the California High School Athlete of the Year at Kennedy in 1982, following in the footsteps of her sister Sherri. Also following her sister, she was named the national Girl's "High School Athlete of the Year" by Track and Field News, two years in a row. Her 1982 52.39 was the NFHS national high school record for eighteen years, before it was beaten by Monique Henderson. At age 15, she qualified for the ill-fated 1980 U.S. Olympic Team which was part of the 1980 Olympic Boycott finishing behind sister Sherri at the 1980 Olympic Trials, the first sisters to make the Olympic team simultaneously in the same event.

She is currently an assistant coach at the College of the Canyons.

== Personal life ==
Howard's older sister, Sherri, is also an Olympic athlete. Her husband, Virgil Hill, is a former Olympic boxer. They met while competing at the 1984 Summer Olympics. Her daughter, Azaria Hill, is a bobsledder for Team USA.
