= Brigitte Senglaub =

Swiss sprinter

Personal information
- Nationality: Swiss
- Born: 1 March 1958 (age 67)

Sport
- Sport: Sprinting
- Event: 100 metres

Brigitte Senglaub (born 1 March 1958) is a Swiss sprinter. She competed in the women's 100 metres at the 1980 Summer Olympics.
