= Mosi Alli =

Tanzanian sprinter (born 1961)

Personal information
- Nationality: Tanzanian
- Born: 3 July 1961 (age 64)

Sport
- Sport: Sprinting
- Event: 100 metres

Mosi Alli (born 3 July 1961) is a Tanzanian sprinter. She competed in the women's 100 metres at the 1980 Summer Olympics.
