= Shirley Thomas (athlete) =

British sprinter

Personal information
- Nationality: British (English)
- Born: 15 June 1963 (age 63)

Sport
- Sport: Athletics
- Event: Sprints
- Club: Selsonia AC; Borough of Hounslow AC
Medal record
Women's athletics
Representing Great Britain
World Championships
Silver medal – second place	1983 Helsinki	4×100 m
European Championships
Silver medal – second place	1982 Athens	4×100 m

Shirley Thomas (born 15 June 1963) is a former British sprinter who competed mainly in the 100 meters and 4 x 100 meters relay. She won a silver medal in the relay at the 1983 World Championships in Helsinki. She also competed at the 1984 Olympic Games in Los Angeles.

== Biography ==
Thomas finished third behind Wendy Hoyte in the 100 metres event at the 1981 WAAA Championships and one month later, at the 1981 European Junior Championships in Utrecht, Thomas won a silver medal in the 100 meters behind the GDR's Kathrin Bohme, running a wind-assisted 11.43 secs. She also finished sixth in the 200 m final.

In 1982, still only 19, Thomas competed at the European Championships in Athens, where she anchored the British sprint relay quartet to a silver medal. Her teammates were, Wendy Hoyte, Kathy Cook (then Smallwood) and Beverley Callender.

At the inaugural World Championships in Helsinki in 1983, Thomas once again anchored Great Britain to a silver medal in the sprint relay, finishing behind the East Germans but managing to hold off the fast finishing Jamaicans, anchored by Merlene Ottey, 42.71 to 42.73. In the 100 meters, she ran 11.48 to reach the semi-finals.

Thomas earned Olympic selection in 1984. However, at the 100 meters in Los Angeles, she only managed to run 12.13 secs in her heat due to injury. The injury also cost her the chance of an Olympic relay medal, with the British squad going on to win the bronze. Thomas's replacement was Simmone Jacobs.

At the time of her sprinting career, Thomas weighed 48 kg and was 1.60 m tall.

Shirley Thomas' achievements occurred during the so-called Golden Era of British women's sprinting, made all the more remarkable as many of their rivals were on performance-enhancing drug programs.

Personal Bests

- 100m 11.31 (+1.9) Hendon 3 July 1983 – ran a wind-assisted 11.13 (+3.8) Cmbrawn 27 May 1984
- 200m 23.36 (+0.4) Gateshead 10 June 1984 – ran a wind-assisted 23.14 (+2.1) Cmbrawn 29 May 1984
