= 1981 European Athletics Indoor Championships – Women's 400 metres =

The women's 400 metres event at the 1981 European Athletics Indoor Championships was held on 21 and 22 February.

== Medalists ==
Gold	Silver	Bronze
Jarmila Kratochvílová; Czechoslovakia	Natalya Bochina; Soviet Union	Verona Elder; Great Britain

== Results ==
=== Heats ===
First 2 from each heat (Q) and the net 2 fastest (q) qualified for the semifinals.

Rank	Heat	Name	Nationality	Time	Notes
1	1	Natalya Bochina	Soviet Union	52.95	Q
2	1	Erica Rossi	Italy	53.04	Q
3	3	Jarmila Kratochvílová	Czechoslovakia	53.25	Q
4	3	Verona Elder	Great Britain	53.69	Q
5	2	Karoline Käfer	Austria	53.75	Q
6	1	Rita Daimer	West Germany	53.87	q
7	2	Sophie Malbranque	France	54.10	Q
8	3	Sylvie Revaux	France	54.55	q
9	1	Marie-Christine Champenois	France	54.59	
10	2	Liliya Tuznikova	Soviet Union	55.05	
	3	Montserrat Pujol	Spain	DNS	

=== Semifinals ===
First 3 from each semifinal qualified directly (Q) for the final.

Rank	Heat	Name	Nationality	Time	Notes
1	2	Jarmila Kratochvílová	Czechoslovakia	52.04	Q
2	2	Karoline Käfer	Austria	52.56	Q
3	1	Verona Elder	Great Britain	52.80	Q
4	2	Erica Rossi	Italy	52.81	
5	1	Natalya Bochina	Soviet Union	53.20	Q
6	2	Sylvie Revaux	France	54.01	
7	1	Sophie Malbranque	France	54.59	
8	1	Rita Daimer	West Germany	54.61	

=== Final ===
Rank	Name	Nationality	Time	Notes
1st place, gold medalist(s)	Jarmila Kratochvílová	Czechoslovakia	50.07	CR
2nd place, silver medalist(s)	Natalya Bochina	Soviet Union	52.32	AJR
3rd place, bronze medalist(s)	Verona Elder	Great Britain	52.37	
4	Karoline Käfer	Austria	52.50	
