= Edwige Bancole =

Beninese sprinter

Personal information
- Nationality: Beninese

Sport
- Sport: Sprinting
- Event: 100 metres

Edwige Bancole is a Beninese sprinter. She competed in the women's 100 metres at the 1980 Summer Olympics. She was the first woman to represent Benin at the Olympics.
