= Monica Stevens =

Antigua and Barbuda sprinter

Personal information
- Nationality: Antigua and Barbuda
- Born: 14 January 1967 (age 58)

Sport
- Sport: Sprinting
- Event: 4 × 400 metres relay

Monica Stevens (born 14 January 1967) is an Antigua and Barbuda sprinter. She competed in the women's 4 × 400 metres relay at the 1984 Summer Olympics. She is among only 65 Olympians to compete from Antigua and Barbuda.
