= 1986 European Athletics Championships – Women's 4 × 400 metres relay =

Women's 4 × 400 metres relay at the European Athletics Championships

The women's 4 × 400 metres relay event at the 1986 European Athletics Championships was held in Stuttgart, then West Germany, at Neckarstadion on 31 August 1986.

== Medalists ==
Gold	Kirsten Emmelmann; Sabine Busch; Petra Müller; Marita Koch; East Germany
Silver	Gisela Kinzel; Ute Thimm; Heidi-Elke Gaugel; Gaby Bussmann; West Germany
Bronze	Ewa Kasprzyk; Marzena Wojdecka; Elżbieta Kapusta; Genowefa Błaszak; Poland

== Results ==
=== Final ===
31 August

Rank	Nation	Competitors	Time	Notes
1st place, gold medalist(s)	East Germany	Kirsten Emmelmann; Sabine Busch; Petra Müller; Marita Koch	3:16.87	CR
2nd place, silver medalist(s)	West Germany	Gisela Kinzel; Ute Thimm; Heidi-Elke Gaugel; Gaby Bussmann	3:22.80	NR
3rd place, bronze medalist(s)	Poland	Ewa Kasprzyk; Marzena Wojdecka; Elżbieta Kapusta; Genowefa Błaszak	3:24.65	NR
4	Bulgaria	Yuliana Marinova; Pepa Pavlova; Yordanka Stoyanova; Rositsa Stamenova	3:26.26	
5	Italy	Marisa Masullo; Cosetta Campana; Giuseppina Cirulli; Erica Rossi	3:32.30	
6	Spain	Esther Lahoz; Montserrat Pujol; Cristina Pérez; Blanca Lacambra	3:32.51	
	Soviet Union	Vineta Ikauniece; Olga Nazarova; Marina Stepanova; Olga Vladykina	DQ	

== Participation ==
According to an unofficial count, 28 athletes from 7 countries participated in the event.

- Bulgaria (4)
- East Germany (4)
- Italy (4)
- Poland (4)
- Soviet Union (4)
- Spain (4)
- West Germany (4)
