= Sabine Günther =

East German sprinter

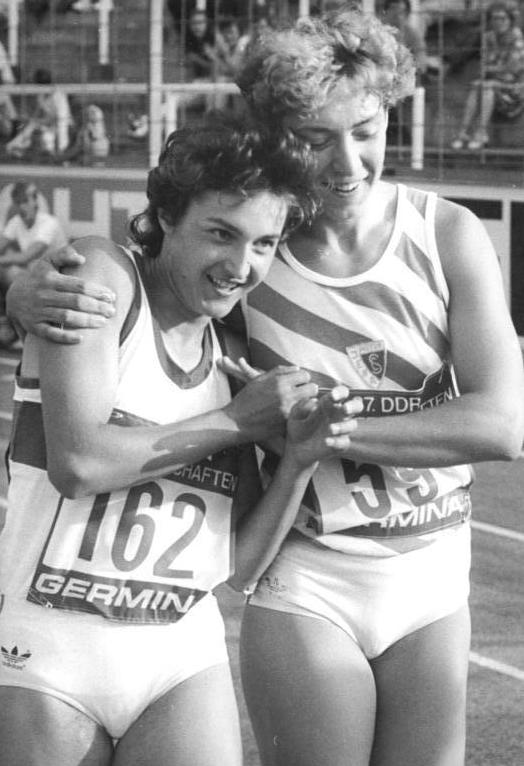
- Günther (right) with Silke Gladisch in 1986

Medal record

Women's athletics

Representing East Germany

European Championships
Gold medal – first place	1982 Athens	4×100 m
Gold medal – first place	1986 Stuttgart	4×100 m
Gold medal – first place	1990 Split	4×100 m
Bronze medal – third place	1982 Athens	200 m

Sabine Günther (née Rieger; born 6 November 1963 in Jena) is a former East German sprinter who competed mainly in the 200 metres.

== Biography ==
Günther won the 200 metres gold medal at the 1981 European Junior Championships. At the 1982 European Championships, she won the bronze medal in the 200 metres and a gold medal in the 4 × 100 metres relay together with teammates Gesine Walther, Bärbel Wöckel and Marlies Göhr. The team finished in 42.19 seconds with Günther running the third leg.

The relay team of Günther (Silke Gladisch, Marlies Göhr and Ingrid Auerswald) set a world record of 41.37 seconds at the 1985 IAAF World Cup event in Canberra. The world record stood until 2012.

At the 1986 European Championships, Günther only placed seventh in the individual distance, but won another gold medal in the 4 × 100 metres relay together with Silke Gladisch, Ingrid Auerswald and Marlies Göhr. Their time was 41.84 seconds, and Günther ran the second leg. At the 1990 European Championships, Günther again placed seventh in the individual distance, but won yet another gold medal in the 4 × 100 metres relay, this time with Silke Möller (formerly Gladisch), Katrin Krabbe and Kerstin Behrendt. Günther ran the last leg, crossing the finish line to clock in 41.68 seconds.

With united Germany, Günther helped finish fifth at the 1992 Olympic Games with a new relay team composed of Andrea Philipp, Silke Knoll, Andrea Thomas and Sabine Günther.

Günther represented the sports club SC Motor Jena and won silver medals at the East German championships in 1986 (100 m) and 1990 (200 m). Her personal best times were 11.19 in the 100 metres, achieved in September 1985 in East Berlin, and 22.37 in the 200 metres, achieved in June 1982 in Cottbus.

Günther is 1.70 metres tall; during her active career she weighed 60 kg.
