= Emma Sulter =

French sprinter (born 1952)

Personal information
- Nationality: French
- Born: Emma Sulter; 15 October 1952 Fort-de-France, Martinique

Sport
- Sport: Sprinting
Medal record
Women's athletics
Representing France
Mediterranean Games
| Gold medal – first place | 1979 Split | 4 × 100 metres relay |

Emma Sulter (born 15 January 1952) is a French and Martiniquaise sprinter. Sulter's athletics career was discovered late, though managed to win the women's 100 metres at the French Junior Championships 1979 Mediterranean Games and qualify for the 1970 European Athletics Junior Championships. During her career, she competed for France at two Olympic Games and won a gold medal at the 1979 Mediterranean Games. After her career, she was an educator and a sports administrator.

== Early life and junior career ==
Emma Sulter was born on 15 January 1952 in the Tivoli District of Fort-de-France, Martinique. Her father was a musician. Sulter's athletics talent was stated by her to be discovered late, being discovered by her physical education teacher at the Collège François Auguste Perrinon. She was entered to the French Junior Championships, winning the women's 100 metres and qualified for the 1970 European Athletics Junior Championships held in Paris, France.

== Career ==
Two years after the European Junior Championships, she was initially selected to compete for France at the 1972 Summer Olympics in the women's 100 metres but was eventually left out of the team. At the 1975 French Athletics Championships, she became the national champion in the women's 100 metres. A year later, she finally made her Olympic debut at the 1976 Summer Olympics. competing for France in the women's 4 × 100 metres relay.

With the French women's 4 × 100 meters relay team, they won the women's 4 × 100 metres relay at the 1979 Mediterranean Games in Split. The following year, she competed at the 1980 Summer Olympics for her last participation at the Summer Games. She competed in the women's 100 metres and women's 4 × 100 metres relay. She failed from advancing further than the qualifying heats of the women's 100 metres though reached the finals of the latter event with her teammates, placing fifth overall.

== Later life ==
After her career, she became a physical education and sports teacher. She was also the president of Spécial Olympique Martinique and headed the delegation for the 2003 Special Olympics World Summer Games. In 2021, a street was named after her in Tivoli.
