= Trần Thanh Vân (athlete) =

Vietnamese sprinter

Personal information
- Nationality: Vietnamese
- Born: 24 July 1959 (age 66)

Sport
- Sport: Sprinting
- Event: 100 metres

Trần Thanh Vân (born 24 July 1959) is a Vietnamese sprinter. She competed in the women's 100 metres at the 1980 Summer Olympics.

Tran was coached by Nguyễn Hoàng An, and she was part of a training group that held most of Vietnam's records in athletics.

Tran later became the head of athletics in Hanoi. Under her training, Hanoi athletes won 100 m and 400 m gold medals ahead of rival Ho Chi Minh City athletics teams.
