= East German Indoor Athletics Championships =

Historical sport competition in East Germany

- Sport: Indoor track and field
- Founded: 1964
- Country: East Germany

The East German Indoor Athletics Championships (German: DDR Leichtathletik-Hallenmeisterschaften) was an annual indoor track and field competition organised by the East German Athletics Association (German: Deutscher Verband für Leichtathletik der DDR), which served as the national championship for the sport in East Germany. Typically held over two days in February during the German winter, it was first held in 1964.

The event was contested separately from the West German Indoor Athletics Championships until 1991, when the German Indoor Athletics Championships was held as the first Unified Germany championships. National indoor championships in racewalking and combined track and field events were usually contested at separate locations.

== Events ==
The following athletics events featured as standard on the East German Indoor Championships programme:

- Sprint: 60 m, 200 m, 400 m
- Distance track events: 800 m, 1500 m, 3000 m
- Hurdles: 60 m hurdles
- Jumps: long jump, triple jump (men only), high jump, pole vault (men only)
- Throws: shot put
- Racewalking: 5000 m (men), 3000 m (women)
- Combined events: heptathlon (men), pentathlon (women)

The 60 metres was set as the standard short sprint and short hurdles distance in 1978, with sprint and hurdles events being contested over 50 metres and 55 metres in earlier years. A 100-yard dash was held from 1973 to 1989 (100 metres in 1976 and 1977). The 200 m was introduced in 1983.

The men's 5000 m was introduced in 1976. A men's pentathlon was introduced in 1974, changing to heptathlon in 1981, with an octathlon being held in the period from 1987–89. The men's racewalking distance varied, with 10,000 m races from 1967–75 and 1982–88, 20,000 m during 1976–1981, then 5000 m at the final two editions.

The women's programme mostly matched the men's, with the exception of distance events which was introduced later. Women began to compete over 1500 m in 1970, 3000 m in 1981, 5000 m in 1989, and in racewalking in 1985. Women did not take part in triple jump or pole vault during the competition's lifetime.

== Editions ==
Ed.	Year	City	Venue	Dates
1.	1964	Berlin	Dynamo-Sporthalle	19 February 1964
2.	1965	Berlin		14 February 1965
3.	1966	Berlin	Dynamo-Sporthalle	27 February 1966
4.	1967	Berlin		19 February 1967
5.	1968	Berlin	Dynamo-Sporthalle	17–18 February 1968
6.	1969	Berlin	Dynamo-Sporthalle	15–16 February 1969
7.	1970	Berlin	Dynamo-Sporthalle	14–15 February 1970
8.	1971	Berlin	Dynamo-Sporthalle	13–14 February 1971
9.	1972	Berlin	Dynamo-Sporthalle	12–13 February 1972
10.	1973	Senftenberg	Sporthalle Aktivist	24–25 February 1973
11.	1974	Berlin		23–24 February 1974
12.	1975	Senftenberg	Sporthalle Aktivist	22–23 February 1975
13.	1976	Berlin	Dynamo-Sporthalle	24–25 January 1976
14.	1977	Berlin	Dynamo-Sporthalle	5–6 March 1977
15.	1978	Senftenberg	Sporthalle Aktivist	25–26 February 1978
16.	1979	Senftenberg	Sporthalle Aktivist	17–18 February 1979
17.	1980	Senftenberg	Sporthalle Aktivist	26–27 January 1980
18.	1981	Senftenberg	Sporthalle Aktivist	14–15 February 1981
19.	1982	Senftenberg	Sporthalle Aktivist	13–14 February 1982
20.	1983	Senftenberg	Sporthalle Aktivist	19–20 February 1983
21.	1984	Senftenberg	Sporthalle Aktivist	21–22 February 1984
22.	1985	Senftenberg	Sporthalle Aktivist	16–17 February 1985
23.	1986	Senftenberg	Sporthalle Aktivist	15–16 February 1986
24.	1987	Senftenberg	Sporthalle Aktivist	7–8 February 1987
25.	1988	Senftenberg	Sporthalle Aktivist	26–27 February 1988
26.	1989	Senftenberg	Sporthalle Aktivist	11–12 February 1989
27.	1990	Senftenberg	Sporthalle Aktivist	17–18 February 1990
