= Joan Baptiste =

British sprinter (born 1959)

Personal information
- Nationality: British (English)
- Born: 12 October 1959 (age 66) St. Vincent
- Height: 170 cm (5 ft 7 in)
- Weight: 61 kg (134 lb)

Sport
- Sport: Athletics
- Event: Sprints
- Club: Wolverhampton & Bilston Athletics Club (WBAC)
Medal record
Women's athletics
Representing Great Britain
World Championships
Silver medal – second place	1983 Helsinki	4x100 m relay
European Indoor Championships
Silver medal – second place	1983 Budapest	200 metres
Representing England
Commonwealth Games
Gold medal – first place	1986 Edinburgh	4x100 m relay

Joan Jeanetta Baptiste (born 12 October 1959) is a former British sprinter who competed mainly in the 100 metres, 200 metres and 4 x 100 metres relay. She won a silver medal at the inaugural World Championships in 1983 in the 4 × 100 m relay and competed in the 200 metres at the 1984 Olympic Games in Los Angeles.

== Biography ==
Baptiste was born in St. Vincent and was a member of the Wolverhampton & Bilston Athletics Club. She emerged in 1983, winning the AAAs indoor 200 m title, before breaking the UK indoor record with 23.37 secs to win a silver medal at the European Indoor Championships in Budapest, the winner was Marita Koch. Later that year, she competed at the World Championships in Helsinki, where she won a silver medal in the 4 x 100 metres relay, running the first leg. Her teammates were Kathy Cook, Bev Callender and Shirley Thomas. They ran 42.71 secs, finishing behind the East Germans and just ahead of the fast finishing Jamaicans. She also reached the semi-finals of the 200 metres.

Baptiste reached the 200 metres semi-finals at the 1984 Los Angeles Olympics, running a lifetime best of 22.86 secs. She improved her own UK indoor record to 23.33 secs in Stuttgart in 1985. She went on to finish fourth in the 200 metres final at the 1985 European Indoor Championships. Her 23.33 would remain the national indoor record for nine years, until Katharine Merry ran 23.00 in 1994, in Glasgow.

In 1986, Baptiste represented England at the won a Commonwealth Games in Edinburgh and won the gold medal in the 4 × 100 m relay, along with Paula Dunn, Kathy Cook and Heather Oakes.

Baptiste became the British 200 metres champion after winning the British WAAA Championships title at the 1987 WAAA Championships and competed that year at the World Championships in Rome as a member of the sprint relay squad.

== Personal bests ==
- 100 metres – 11.32 Zurich SWI 24 August 1983
- 200 metres – 22.86 Los Angeles USA 9 August 1984
- 200 metres (indoors) 23.33 23 February 1985 (former UK indoor record)
