= Gesine Walther =

German sprinter

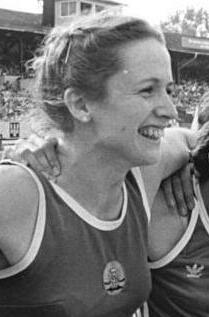
- Walther in 1984

Medal record

Women's athletics

Representing East Germany

European Championships
Gold medal – first place	1982 Athens	4×100 m

Gesine Walther (born 6 October 1962) is a retired German sprinter.

== Biography ==
In 1982 Walther became the first European indoor champion in the 200 m event. At the 1982 European Championships she finished fifth in the 100 m, fourth in the 200 m and won a gold medal in the 4 × 100 m relay together with teammates Bärbel Wöckel, Sabine Günther and Marlies Göhr. The team finished in 42.19 seconds with Walther running the first leg.

On 3 June 1984 in Erfurt, Walther, together with Sabine Busch, Dagmar Rübsam and Marita Koch, set a world record in the 4 × 400 m relay of 3:15.92 minutes. Both the world record and the European record was improved at the 1988 Olympics.

Walther represented the sports club SC Turbine Erfurt, and won silver medals at the East German championships in 1984 (100 m) and 1980 and 1982 (200 m). Her personal best times were 11.13 in the 100 m, achieved in August 1982 in Cottbus, 22.24 in the 200 m, achieved in July 1982 in Dresden and 50.03 in the 400 m, achieved in May 1984 in Jena.

Walther is 1.76 metres tall; during her active career she weighed 65 kg.

== See also ==
- German all-time top lists - 200 metres
