= Christina Sussiek =

German track and field athlete

Christina Sussiek (born 4 March 1960 in Werther) is a retired athlete who represented West Germany. She specialized in sprints and long jump, and competed for the club LG Bayer Leverkusen.

At the German Outdoor Championships 1980 she finished second in the 100 and 200 metres races both times only narrowly and after fierce battles vanquished by the invincible olympic champion Annegret Richter.

On 30 January 1981 in Dortmund she ran a new world record of 3:34,38 minutes in 4 × 400 metres relay with the West German national team. The team consisted of Heidi-Elke Gaugel, Christina Sussiek, Christiane Brinkmann and Gaby Bußmann.

Sussiek finished fifth in long jump at the 1981 European Indoor Championships and won a bronze medal in 200 metres at the 1983 European Indoor Championships. In addition she competed at the 1984 Summer Olympics (4 × 400 m relay), the 1983 World Championships (long jump) and the 1988 European Indoor Championships (400 metres) without success.
