= Mariya Shishkova =

Bulgarian sprinter

Personal information
- Nationality: Bulgarian
- Born: 21 September 1953 (age 72) General Toshevo, Bulgaria

Sport
- Sport: Sprinting
- Event: 100 metres
Medal record
Representing Bulgaria
Summer Universiade
Silver medal – second place	1977 Sofia	4x100m relay

Mariya Shishkova (born 21 September 1953) is a Bulgarian sprinter. She competed in the women's 100 metres at the 1980 Summer Olympics.
