= Ewa Pisiewicz =

Polish sprinter

Ewa Halina Rybak-Pisiewicz (born May 7, 1962 in Lubartów, Lubelskie) is a former female track and field sprinter from Poland, who represented her native country at the 1988 Summer Olympics in Seoul. She set her personal best (11.19) in the women's 100 metres event in 1985.
