= Laureen Beckles =

French sprinter (born 1958)

Personal information
- Nationality: French
- Born: 30 August 1958 (age 67) Islington, London, England

Sport
- Country: France
- Sport: Track and field
- Event: 100 m
- Club: CSA Garches

Laureen Beckles (born 30 August 1958) is a former French track and field athlete, specialising in sprints.

== Biography ==
She participated in the 1980 Olympics, in Moscow, where she reached the semi-finals of the 100 meters.

She won two indoor track championship titles in France in the 50 meters in 1981 and the 60 meters in 1980.

== Prize list ==
- Athletics Indoor Championships France:
  - winner of 50 m in 1981
  - winner of 60 m in 1980

=== Records ===
Personal Bests
Event	Performance	Place	Date
100 m	11 s 54		1980
200 m	24 s 59		1976
