= Elżbieta Stachurska =

Polish sprinter

Elżbieta Stachurska-Woźniak
Personal information
- Nationality: Polish
- Born: Elżbieta Stachurska; 24 March 1959 (age 66) Łódź, Poland
- Height: 1.71 m (5 ft 7 in)
- Weight: 58 kg (128 lb)

Sport
- Sport: Sprinting
- Event: 100 metres
- Club: RKS Łódź

Elżbieta Stachurska–Woźniak (born 24 March 1959) is a Polish sprinter. She competed in the women's 100 metres at the 1980 Summer Olympics.

== Personal bests ==
Outdoor

- 100 metres – 11.36 (1980)
- 200 metres – 23.11 (1980)
