= Ingrid Auerswald =

German athlete (born 1957)

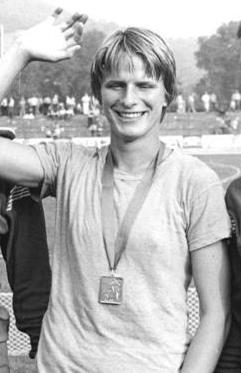
- Auerswald in 1981

Personal information
- Born: Ingrid Brestrich; 2 September 1957 (age 69) Jena, East Germany
Medal record
Women's athletics
Representing East Germany
Olympic Games
Gold medal – first place	1980 Moscow	4×100 m
Silver medal – second place	1988 Seoul	4×100 m
Bronze medal – third place	1980 Moscow	100 m
World Championships
Gold medal – first place	1983 Helsinki	4×100 m
European Championships
Gold medal – first place	1986 Stuttgart	4×100 m

Ingrid Auerswald, née Brestrich, (2 September 1957 in Jena, East Germany) is a retired German athlete who competed mainly in the 100 metres.

== Biography ==
Brestrich-Lange competed for East Germany in the 1980 Summer Olympics held in Moscow in the 100 metres where she finished third behind Lyudmila Kondratyeva and East German teammate Marlies Göhr. She then joined with Göhr and fellow East Germans Romy Müller and Bärbel Wöckel to win gold in the 4 × 100 metres relay.

Due to the Eastern Bloc countries boycotting the Los Angeles Olympics, Auerswald missed the 1984 Games, but returned in the 1988 Seoul Olympics to team up again with Marlies Göhr as well as Silke Möller and Kerstin Behrendt to finish second behind the USA team.

== See also ==
- German all-time top lists – 100 metres
