= Valerie Brisco-Hooks =

American sprinter (born 1960)

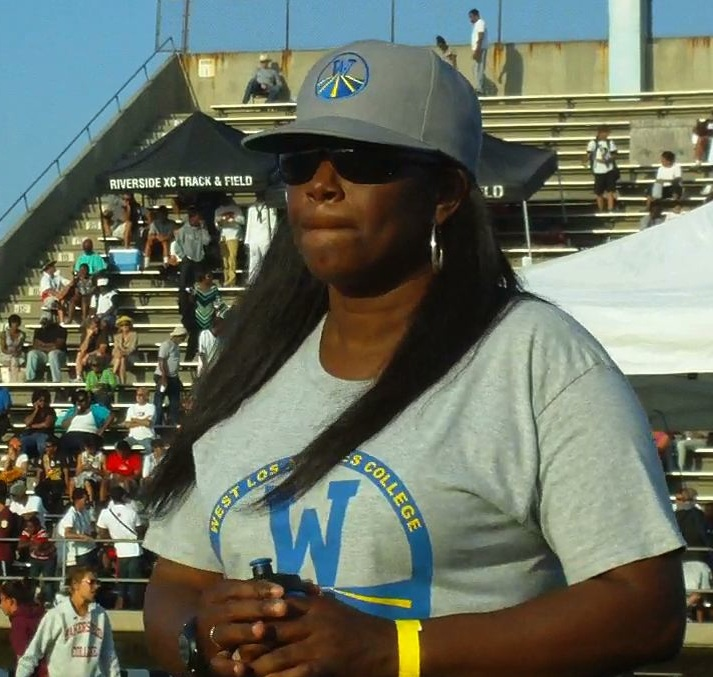
- Valerie Brisco-Hooks during the CCCAA State Championships in May 2012

Personal information
- Born: July 6, 1960 (age 66) Greenwood, Mississippi, U.S.
- Height: 5 ft 7 in (1.70 m)
- Weight: 137 lb (62 kg)

Sport
- Country: United States
- Coached by: Bob Kersee
Medal record
Women's Athletics
Representing the United States
Olympic Games
Gold medal – first place	1984 Los Angeles	200 metres
Gold medal – first place	1984 Los Angeles	400 metres
Gold medal – first place	1984 Los Angeles	4 × 400 m relay
Silver medal – second place	1988 Seoul	4 × 400 m relay
World Championships
Bronze medal – third place	1987 Rome	4 × 400 m relay
Pan American Games
Gold medal – first place	1979 San Juan	4 × 100 m relay
Gold medal – first place	1987 Indianapolis	4 × 400 m relay

Valerie Brisco-Hooks (born Valerie Ann Brisco; July 6, 1960, in Greenwood, Mississippi) is an Olympian who won three gold medals as an Olympic track and field athlete at the 1984 Olympics at Los Angeles, California, making her the first Olympian to win gold medals in both the 200- and 400-meter races at a single Olympics.

== Career ==
Brisco-Hooks' outstanding high school performance led her to the collegiate level of track and field at California State University, Northridge. She continued to excel, winning the 200-meter title at the Association of Intercollegiate Athletics for Women (AIAW) Championships and earning a spot on the U.S. team for the 1979 Pan American Games, where she helped her 4 × 100-meter relay team win the gold medal.

Her 400 metres time of 48.83, set while winning the 1984 Olympics was at the time the Olympic record and still ranks her as the thirteenth fastest woman of all time. She also won a gold medal for the 4 × 400 m. Brisco competed in the 1988 Olympic Games, which took place in Seoul, South Korea, running on the American 4 × 400 meter-relay team, which finished in second place (but below the older record, also), behind the Soviet team that broke the 4 × 400 meter-relay world record. To this date, the American time possesses the second-fastest 4 × 400 relay of all time, behind only the Soviet winner of that race. She coached with Bob Kersee's group of athletes and at West Los Angeles College.

== Achievements ==
3 × Olympic Games Gold medallist
1 × Olympic Games Silver medallist
1 × World Championships Bronze medallist
5 × Olympic Games finalist
1 × World Championships finalist
1 × Current NACAC Record holder - 4 × 400 m

== Personal Bests ==
Event Result Wind Venue Date
50 m individual 6.24 Rosemont (USA) 16.02.1986
100 m 10.99 +1.3 Westwood (USA) 17.05.1986
200 m 21.81 -0.1 Los Angeles (USA) 09.08.1984
200 m indoor 22.83 New York (USA) 22.02.1985
300 m 35.47 Seoul (KOR) 26.09.1988
400 m 48.83 Los Angeles (USA) 06.08.1984
400 m indoor 52.31 Fairfax (USA) 14.02.1988
4 × 400 m 3:15.51 Seoul (KOR) 01.10.1988

== Television guest appearance ==
Brisco-Hooks guest-starred as herself in "Off to the Races," an episode from the second season of The Cosby Show. She ran against Cliff Huxtable (Bill Cosby) at the Penn Relays, filling in at the last minute for an injured member of a rival team during a relay race.

== Personal life ==
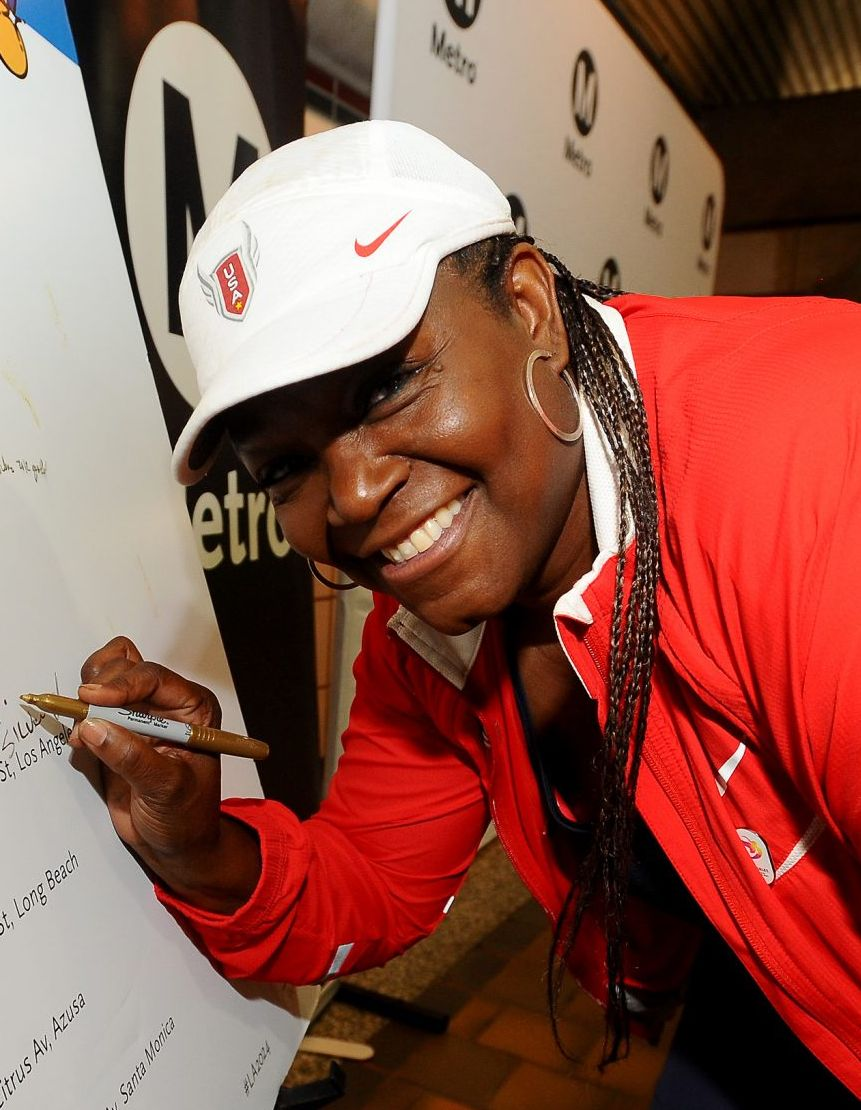
Brisco-Hooks in 2016

Brisco-Hooks married NFL player Alvin Hooks in 1981. Their son, Alvin Hooks Jr., was born in 1982.

In 1995, Brisco-Hooks was inducted into the U.S. National Track and Field Hall of Fame.
