= Marina Zhirova =

Soviet sprinter

Medal record

Women's athletics

Representing Soviet Union

Olympic Games
Bronze medal – third place	1988 Seoul	4×100 m

European Championships
Bronze medal – third place	1986 Stuttgart	4×100 m

Marina Zhirova (Russian: Марина Жирова; born 6 June 1963 Yegoryevsk) is a Soviet former athlete who competed mainly in the 100 metres, training at Trudovye Rezervy in Moscow Oblast.

She competed for the USSR in the 1988 Summer Olympics held in Seoul, South Korea in the 4 x 100 metres where she won the bronze medal with her teammates Lyudmila Kondratyeva, Galina Malchugina and Natalya Pomoshchnikova.
