= Natalya Bochina =

Soviet sprinter

Personal information
- Born: 4 January 1962 (age 64)
Medal record
Women's athletics
Representing the Soviet Union
Olympic Games
Silver medal – second place	1980 Moscow	200 m
Silver medal – second place	1980 Moscow	4×100 m
European Championships
Bronze medal – third place	1986 Stuttgart	4×100 m
European Indoor Championships
Silver medal – second place	1981 Grenoble	400 m

Natalya Valeryevna Bochina (Russian: Наталья Валерьевна Бочина) (born 4 January 1962) is a retired Soviet athlete, who competed mainly in the 200 metres. Bochina trained at Dynamo in Leningrad.

Bochina was born in Leningrad and was relatively young, at 18 years of age, when she competed for the USSR in the 1980 Summer Olympics held in Moscow, Soviet Union. In the 200 metres final she won the silver medal in a time of 22.19 seconds. The winning margin, by Bärbel Wöckel of East Germany, was 0.16 seconds and her time of 22.03 was a new Olympic record. Natalya then helped her teammates Vera Komisova, Lyudmila Maslakova and Vera Anisimova to the silver medal in the 4 × 100 metres relay.
