= Heike Schulte-Mattler =

German sprinter (born 1958)

Olympic medal record

Women's Athletics
Bronze medal – third place	1984 Los Angeles	4 × 400 metres

Heike Schulte-Mattler (née Schmidt; born 27 May 1958 in Oberhausen) is a German athlete who competed mainly in the 400 metres.

She competed for West Germany in the 1984 Summer Olympics held in Los Angeles, U.S. in the 4 × 400 metres where she won the bronze medal with her teammates Ute Thimm, Heidi-Elke Gaugel and Gaby Bußmann.
