= Marie-Christine Cazier =

French sprinter (born 1963)

Medal record

Women's athletics

Representing France

European Championships
Silver medal – second place	1986 Stuttgart	200 m
Bronze medal – third place	1982 Athens	4×100 m

Marie-Christine Cazier-Ballo, née Marie-Christine Cazier, (23 August 1963 in Paris) standing at 178 cm tall is a retired French sprinter, who specialized in the 200 meters. She set three French records over the distance, the last being 22.32 seconds, when she won a silver medal at the 1986 European Championships. She competed in the women's 200 metres at the 1988 Summer Olympics.

== Achievements ==
Year	Competition	Venue	Position	Event	Notes
Representing France
1984	European Indoor Championships	Gothenburg, Sweden	2nd	200 m	
1985	World Indoor Games	Paris, France	2nd	200 m	
1986	European Championships	Stuttgart, West Germany	2nd	200 m	22.32 NR
1987	European Indoor Championships	Liévin, France	3rd	200 m	
