= Ute Thimm =

German sprinter

Medal record

Women's athletics

Representing West Germany

Olympic Games
Bronze medal – third place	1984 Los Angeles	4×400 m

European Championships
Silver medal – second place	1986 Stuttgart	4×400 m

Ute Thimm (née Finger; born 10 July 1958 in Bochum) is a German athlete who competed mainly in the 400 metres.

She competed for West Germany in the 1984 Summer Olympics held in Los Angeles, United States in the 4 × 400 metres where she won the bronze medal with her teammates Heike Schulte-Mattler, Heide-Elke Gaugel and Gaby Bußmann. She was the second runner. Time over-all: 3'22"98.

In the same Olympic Games she finished sixth in the 400 metres competition. As last runner with her teammates Edith Oker, Michaela Schabinger and Heidi-Elke Gaugel she finished on the fifth place in the 4 × 100 metres.

She won another medal at the 1986 European Championships in Athletics: The Silver Medal right behind the team of East Germany with her teammates Gisela Kinzel, Heidi-Elke Gaugel and Gaby Bußmann in the 4 × 400 meters competition, also as second runner, time: 3'22"80. She also finished fifth in the 400 metres.

With the German 4 × 400-metres-relay she finished fourth in the Finals of the 1988 Summer Olympics in 3'22"49 with her colleagues Helga Arendt, Andrea Thomas and Gudrun Abt.

She also participated in the 1982 European Championships in Athletics, the 1983 World Championships in Athletics and 1987 World Championships in Athletics but did not win any medals.

First she was a member of ASV Köln, then from 1986 on she belonged to TV Wattenscheid. She is 1,67 metres tall (5 feet and 6 inches) and weighed 54 kg (119 lb) in her active time.
