= Gaby Bußmann =

German athlete

Medal record

Women's athletics

Representing West Germany

Olympic Games
Bronze medal – third place	1984 Los Angeles	4×400 m

European Championships
Silver medal – second place	1986 Stuttgart	4×400 m

Gaby Bußmann (born 8 October 1959 in Haltern) is a German athlete who specialized in the 400 metres.

She competed for West Germany at the 1984 Summer Olympics held in Los Angeles, U.S. where she won the bronze medal in the women's 4 × 400 metres with her team mates Heike Schulte-Mattler, Ute Thimm and Heidi-Elke Gaugel.

She became West German champion in 1978, 1978, 1982 and 1983, and won silver medals in 1984 and 1986. She represented the clubs ASV Köln, LG Ahlen-Hamm and SC Eintracht Hamm. Indoors she became German champion in 1979, 1981 and 1982.
