= Bärbel Wöckel =

East German sprinter

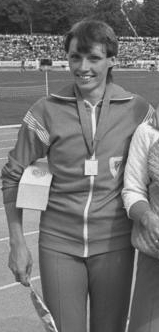

Medal record

Women's athletics

Representing East Germany

Olympic Games
Gold medal – first place	1976 Montreal	200 m
Gold medal – first place	1976 Montreal	4×100 m
Gold medal – first place	1980 Moscow	200 m
Gold medal – first place	1980 Moscow	4×100 m

European Championships
Gold medal – first place	1974 Rome	4×100 m
Gold medal – first place	1982 Athens	200 m
Gold medal – first place	1982 Athens	4×100 m
Silver medal – second place	1982 Athens	100 m

Bärbel Wöckel (née Eckert; born 21 March 1955) is a former East German sprinter. She never ran a world record in the individual disciplines. However, she ran several world records as part of relay teams with Doris Maletzki, Renate Stecher and Christina Heinich over 4 × 100 meters, the last time on September 8, 1974, in Rome. At the GDR Championships she took first place in the 4 × 100-meter relay in 1974, 1977, 1978, 1981 to 1984. In 1976 she won third place with the team.

Documents uncovered after the fall of communism showed that during this time, Wöckel, like many of her East German colleagues, was forced to participate in the state-organized doping program. Despite this, her records and medals have been allowed to stand.

== Career ==
Wöckel won four Olympic gold medals between the 200 metres race and 4 × 100 metres relay, two each in the 1976 and 1980 Olympics. In each of those years, Wöckel placed first in the 200 m and 4 × 100 metres relay races. She won a gold medal at the 1974 European Championships as the anchor of the 4 × 100 m relay, which set a world record of 42.50.

In Athens, she won the gold in the 200 m and as a part of the 4 × 100 m relay team as well as a silver in the 100 metres at the 1982 European Championships.

Bärbel Wöckel competed for the club SC Motor Jena during her active career. She won 4 national 200 metre championships, as well as an indoor title in 1984. She won 3 European Cup titles in 1981, 200, 4 × 100, 4 × 400 metres. In the IAAF World Cup 1981 she won 2 Gold Medals in 4 × 100 and 4 × 400 relays. Also finishing 3rd in the 200.

Her rival, Marita Koch, complained in a letter that Bärbel received higher doses of steroids than her, because she had relatives in the company Jenapharm.

== Awards ==
- 1974: Patriotic Order of Merit (German: Vaterländischer Verdienstorden, or VVO) in Bronze
- 1976: Patriotic Order of Merit in silver
- 1980 and 1984: Patriotic Order of Merit in gold
- 2018: DLV-Ehrennadel in gold

== See also ==
- German all-time top lists – 100 metres
- German all-time top lists – 200 metres
- List of multiple Olympic gold medalists

Sporting positions
Preceded by (East Germany) Renate Stecher	Women's 200 m Best Year Performance; 1976	Succeeded by (Poland) Irena Szewińska
Preceded by (East Germany) Marita Koch	Women's 200 m Best Year Performance; 1980	Succeeded by (United States) Evelyn Ashford
