= Heidi-Elke Gaugel =

German sprinter

Medal record

Women's athletics

Representing West Germany

Olympic Games
Bronze medal – third place	1984 Los Angeles	4×400 m

European Championships
Silver medal – second place	1986 Stuttgart	4×400 m

Heidi-Elke Gaugel (born 11 July 1959 in Schönaich) is a retired female German athlete who specialized in the 400 m.

== Biography ==
Gaugel competed for West Germany at the 1984 Summer Olympics, held in Los Angeles, United States, where she won the bronze medal with her team mates Heike Schulte-Mattler, Ute Thimm and Gaby Bußmann in the women's 4 × 400 m relay event.

She married the middle-distance runner Harald Hudak. During the time she resided in Japan with her husband, she worked for NHK Radio 2's German radio course as a teacher. She represented the club VfL Sindelfingen.
