= 1978 European Athletics Championships – Women's 100 metres =

Women's 100 metres at the 1978 European Athletics Championships
- Venue: Stadion Evžena Rošického
- Location: Prague
- Dates: 29 August (heats); 30 August (semifinals & final)
- Competitors: 23 from 14 nations
- Winning time: 11.13

Medalists
gold medal	Marlies Göhr	East Germany
silver medal	Linda Haglund	Sweden
bronze medal	Lyudmila Maslakova	Soviet Union

The women's 100 metres at the 1978 European Athletics Championships was held in Prague, then Czechoslovakia, at Stadion Evžena Rošického on 29 and 30 August 1978.

== Participation ==
According to an unofficial count, 23 athletes from 14 countries participated in the event.

- Austria (1)
- Bulgaria (2)
- Czechoslovakia (1)
- East Germany (2)
- Finland (1)
- France (3)
- Ireland (1)
- Italy (1)
- Netherlands (2)
- Poland (1)
- Soviet Union (3)
- Sweden (1)
- Great Britain (2)
- West Germany (2)

== Results ==
=== Heats ===
29 August

==== Heat 1 ====
Rank	Name	Nationality	Time	Notes
1	Marlies Göhr	East Germany	11.34	Q
2	Lyudmila Kondratyeva	Soviet Union	11.41	Q
3	Laura Miano	Italy	11.52	Q
4	Bev Goddard	Great Britain	11.53	Q
5	Helinä Laihorinne	Finland	11.58	Q
6	Annie Alizé	France	11.61	q
7	Elvira Possekel	West Germany	11.82	
8	Tilly Verhoef	Netherlands	12.04	
			Wind: 0.0 m/s	

==== Heat 2 ====
Rank	Name	Nationality	Time	Notes
1	Lyudmila Maslakova	Soviet Union	11.23	Q
2	Sonia Lannaman	Great Britain	11.54	Q
3	Ivanka Valkova	Bulgaria	11.61	Q
4	Michelle Walsh	Ireland	11.70	Q
5	Véronique Rosset	France	11.77	Q
6	Petra Sharp	West Germany	11.84	
7	Brigitte Haest	Austria	11.89	
8	Ludmila Jimramovská	Czechoslovakia	11.91	
			Wind: 0.0 m/s	

==== Heat 3 ====
Rank	Name	Nationality	Time	Notes
1	Linda Haglund	Sweden	11.24	Q
2	Chantal Réga	France	11.38	Q
3	Lyudmila Storozhkova	Soviet Union	11.38	Q
4	Monika Hamann	East Germany	11.52	Q
5	Sofka Popova	Bulgaria	11.65	Q
6	Grażyna Molik	Poland	11.90	
7	Ellie Henzen	Netherlands	12.04	
			Wind: 0.0 m/s	

=== Semi-finals ===
30 August

==== Semi-final 1 ====
Rank	Name	Nationality	Time	Notes
1	Marlies Göhr	East Germany	11.27	Q
2	Linda Haglund	Sweden	11.43	Q
3	Lyudmila Kondratyeva	Soviet Union	11.51	Q
4	Sonia Lannaman	Great Britain	11.54	Q
5	Laura Miano	Italy	11.71	
6	Véronique Rosset	France	11.80	
7	Sofka Popova	Bulgaria	11.87	
8	Annie Alizé	France	11.87	
			Wind: -1.1 m/s	

==== Semi-final 2 ====
Rank	Name	Nationality	Time	Notes
1	Lyudmila Maslakova	Soviet Union	11.42	Q
2	Monika Hamann	East Germany	11.47	Q
3	Lyudmila Storozhkova	Soviet Union	11.52	Q
4	Chantal Réga	France	11.59	Q
5	Bev Goddard	Great Britain	11.72	
6	Ivanka Valkova	Bulgaria	11.80	
7	Helinä Laihorinne	Finland	11.82	
8	Michelle Walsh	Ireland	11.95	
			Wind: -1.5 m/s	

=== Final ===
30 August

Rank	Name	Nationality	Time	Notes
1st place, gold medalist(s)	Marlies Göhr	East Germany	11.13	CR
2nd place, silver medalist(s)	Linda Haglund	Sweden	11.29	
3rd place, bronze medalist(s)	Lyudmila Maslakova	Soviet Union	11.31	
4	Monika Hamann	East Germany	11.33	
5	Lyudmila Storozhkova	Soviet Union	11.33	
6	Lyudmila Kondratyeva	Soviet Union	11.38	
7	Chantal Réga	France	11.49	
8	Sonia Lannaman	Great Britain	11.67	
			Wind: 0.0 m/s	
