= 1978 European Athletics Championships – Women's 4 × 100 metres relay =

Women's 4 × 100 metres relay at the European Athletics Championships

The women's 4 × 100 metres relay at the 1978 European Athletics Championships was held in Prague, then Czechoslovakia, at Stadion Evžena Rošického on 2 and 3 September 1978.

== Medalists ==
Gold	Vera Anisimova; Lyudmila Maslakova; Lyudmila Kondratyeva; Lyudmila Storozhkova; Soviet Union
Silver	Bev Goddard; Kathy Smallwood; Sharon Colyear; Sonia Lannaman; Great Britain
Bronze	Johanna Klier; Monika Hamann; Carla Bodendorf; Marlies Göhr; East Germany

== Results ==
=== Final ===
3 September

Rank	Nation	Competitors	Time	Notes
1st place, gold medalist(s)	Soviet Union	Vera Anisimova; Lyudmila Maslakova; Lyudmila Kondratyeva; Lyudmila Storozhkova	42.54	
2nd place, silver medalist(s)	Great Britain	Bev Goddard; Kathy Smallwood; Sharon Colyear; Sonia Lannaman	42.72	
3rd place, bronze medalist(s)	East Germany	Johanna Klier; Monika Hamann; Carla Bodendorf; Marlies Göhr	43.07	
4	Bulgaria	Sofka Popova; Liliyana Ivanova; Zdravka Shipokliyeva; Ivanka Valkova	43.47	
5	Poland	Grażyna Rabsztyn; Zofia Bielczyk; Jolanta Stalmach; Irena Szewińska	43.83	
6	West Germany	Elvira Possekel; Dagmar Schenten; Claudia Steger; Petra Sharp	44.34	
7	Sweden	Linda Haglund; Helena Pihl; Jeanette Rangeby; Lena Möller	44.37	
	France	Véronique Rosset; Annie Alizé; Chantal Réga; Raymonde Naigre	DNF	

=== Heats ===
2 September

==== Heat 1 ====
Rank	Nation	Competitors	Time	Notes
1	East Germany	Johanna Klier; Monika Hamann; Carla Bodendorf; Marlies Göhr	43.05	Q
2	France	Véronique Rosset; Annie Alizé; Chantal Réga; Raymonde Naigre	43.78	Q
3	Bulgaria	Sofka Popova; Liliyana Ivanova; Zdravka Shipokliyeva; Ivanka Valkova	43.97	Q
4	Poland	Grażyna Rabsztyn; Zofia Bielczyk; Jolanta Stalmach; Irena Szewińska	44.20	Q
5	Italy	Andriana Cari; Paola Bolognesi; Marisa Masullo; Laura Miano	44.95	

==== Heat 2 ====
Rank	Nation	Competitors	Time	Notes
1	Soviet Union	Vera Anisimova; Lyudmila Maslakova; Lyudmila Kondratyeva; Lyudmila Storozhkova	43.35	Q
2	Great Britain	Bev Goddard; Kathy Smallwood; Sharon Colyear; Sonia Lannaman	43.90	Q
3	Sweden	Linda Haglund; Helena Pihl; Jeanette Rangeby; Lena Möller	44.31	Q
4	West Germany	Elvira Possekel; Dagmar Schenten; Claudia Steger; Petra Sharp	44.58	Q
5	Czechoslovakia	Daniela Drinková; Dana Široká; Zdena Holánová; Ludmila Jimramovská	45.03	

== Participation ==
According to an unofficial count, 40 athletes from 10 countries participated in the event.

- Bulgaria (4)
- Czechoslovakia (4)
- East Germany (4)
- France (4)
- Italy (4)
- Poland (4)
- Soviet Union (4)
- Sweden (4)
- Great Britain (4)
- West Germany (4)
