= 1982 European Athletics Championships – Women's 100 metres =

Women's 100 metres at the 1982 European Athletics Championships
- Venue: Olympic Stadium "Spiros Louis"
- Location: Athens
- Dates: 6 September (heats); 7 September (semifinals & final)
- Competitors: 18 from 11 nations
- Winning time: 11.01

Medalists
gold medal	Marlies Göhr	East Germany
silver medal	Bärbel Wöckel	East Germany
bronze medal	Rose-Aimée Bacoul	France

These are the official results of the Women's 100 metres event at the 1982 European Championships in Athens, Greece, held at Olympic Stadium "Spiros Louis" on 6 and 7 September 1982.

== Participation ==
According to an unofficial count, 18 athletes from 11 countries participated in the event.

- Bulgaria (3)
- Czechoslovakia (1)
- East Germany (3)
- Finland (1)
- France (2)
- Italy (1)
- Norway (1)
- Soviet Union (2)
- Sweden (1)
- Great Britain (2)
- West Germany (1)

== Results ==
=== Heats ===
6 September

==== Heat 1 ====
Rank	Name	Nationality	Time	Notes
1	Marlies Göhr	East Germany	11.18	Q
2	Lyudmila Kondratyeva	Soviet Union	11.38	Q
3	Rose-Aimée Bacoul	France	11.40	Q
4	Sofka Popova	Bulgaria	11.44	Q
5	Marisa Masullo	Italy	11.53	Q
6	Heide-Elke Gaugel	West Germany	11.54	
7	Mona Evjen	Norway	12.08	
			Wind: -0.6 m/s	

==== Heat 2 ====
Rank	Name	Nationality	Time	Notes
1	Bärbel Wöckel	East Germany	11.41	Q
2	Nadezhda Georgieva	Bulgaria	11.45	Q
3	Shirley Thomas	Great Britain	11.53	Q
4	Štěpánka Sokolová	Czechoslovakia	11.61	Q
5	Lena Möller	Sweden	11.87	Q
			Wind: +2.6 m/s	

==== Heat 3 ====
Rank	Name	Nationality	Time	Notes
1	Anelia Nuneva	Bulgaria	11.29	Q
2	Laurence Bily	France	11.35	Q
3	Gesine Walther	East Germany	11.36	Q
4	Wendy Hoyte	Great Britain	11.40	Q
5	Helinä Laihorinne	Finland	11.47	Q
6	Yelena Kelchevskaya	Soviet Union	11.54	q
			Wind: +1.0 m/s	

=== Semi-finals ===
7 September

==== Semi-final 1 ====
Rank	Name	Nationality	Time	Notes
1	Bärbel Wöckel	East Germany	11.19	Q
2	Rose-Aimée Bacoul	France	11.28	Q
3	Gesine Walther	East Germany	11.33	Q
4	Anelia Nuneva	Bulgaria	11.35	Q
5	Lyudmila Kondratyeva	Soviet Union	11.47	
6	Shirley Thomas	Great Britain	11.53	
7	Marisa Masullo	Italy	11.57	
8	Lena Möller	Sweden	11.93	
			Wind: +1.8 m/s	

==== Semi-final 2 ====
Rank	Name	Nationality	Time	Notes
1	Marlies Göhr	East Germany	11.22	Q
2	Wendy Hoyte	Great Britain	11.41	Q
3	Laurence Bily	France	11.43	Q
4	Nadezhda Georgieva	Bulgaria	11.54	Q
5	Yelena Kelchevskaya	Soviet Union	11.58	
6	Sofka Popova	Bulgaria	11.58	
7	Helinä Laihorinne	Finland	11.58	
8	Štěpánka Sokolová	Czechoslovakia	11.73	
			Wind: +1.8 m/s	

=== Final ===
7 September

Rank	Name	Nationality	Time	Notes
1st place, gold medalist(s)	Marlies Göhr	East Germany	11.01	CR
2nd place, silver medalist(s)	Bärbel Wöckel	East Germany	11.20	
3rd place, bronze medalist(s)	Rose-Aimée Bacoul	France	11.29	
4	Anelia Nuneva	Bulgaria	11.30	
5	Gesine Walther	East Germany	11.38	
6	Laurence Bily	France	11.47	
7	Nadezhda Georgieva	Bulgaria	11.68	
8	Wendy Hoyte	Great Britain	12.35	
			Wind: -0.5 m/s	

== See also ==
- 1978 Women's European Championships 100 metres (Prague)
- 1980 Women's Olympic 100 metres (Moscow)
- 1983 Women's World Championships 100 metres (Helsinki)
- 1984 Women's Olympic 100 metres (Los Angeles)
- 1986 Women's European Championships 100 metres (Stuttgart)
- 1987 Women's World Championships 100 metres (Rome)
- 1988 Women's Olympic 100 metres (Seoul)
