= 1977 European Athletics Indoor Championships – Women's 60 metres =

The women's 60 metres event at the 1977 European Athletics Indoor Championships was held on 13 March in San Sebastián.

== Medalists ==
Gold	Silver	Bronze
Marlies Oelsner; East Germany	Lyudmila Storozhkova; Soviet Union	Rita Bottiglieri; Italy

== Results ==
=== Heats ===
First 2 from each heat (Q) and the next 2 fastest (q) qualified for the final.

Rank	Heat	Name	Nationality	Time	Notes
1	2	Marlies Oelsner	East Germany	7.26	Q
2	1	Rita Bottiglieri	Italy	7.35	Q
3	2	Lyudmila Storozhkova	Soviet Union	7.36	Q
4	1	Sharon Colyear	Great Britain	7.38	Q
4	2	Chantal Réga	France	7.38	q
6	1	Annie Alizé	France	7.40	q
7	2	Irena Szewińska	Poland	7.42	
8	1	Vera Anisimova	Soviet Union	7.43	
9	1	Lea Alaerts	Belgium	7.45	
9	2	Ivanka Valkova	Bulgaria	7.45	
11	2	Gisela Grässle	West Germany	7.48	
	1	Linda Haglund	Sweden	DQ	

=== Final ===
Rank	Lane	Name	Nationality	Time	Notes
1st place, gold medalist(s)	2	Marlies Oelsner	East Germany	7.17	
2nd place, silver medalist(s)	1	Lyudmila Storozhkova	Soviet Union	7.24	
3rd place, bronze medalist(s)	6	Rita Bottiglieri	Italy	7.34	
4	5	Chantal Réga	France	7.35	
5	3	Annie Alizé	France	7.39	
6	4	Sharon Colyear	Great Britain	7.39	
