= 1978 European Athletics Indoor Championships – Women's 60 metres =

The women's 60 metres event at the 1978 European Athletics Indoor Championships was held on 12 March in Milan.

== Medalists ==
Gold	Silver	Bronze
Marlies Göhr; East Germany	Linda Haglund; Sweden	Lyudmila Storozhkova; Soviet Union

== Results ==
=== Heats ===
First 2 from each heat (Q) and the next 4 fastest (q) qualified for the semifinals.

Rank	Heat	Name	Nationality	Time	Notes
1	2	Linda Haglund	Sweden	7.20	Q
2	1	Marlies Göhr	East Germany	7.27	Q
3	3	Lyudmila Storozhkova	Soviet Union	7.29	Q
4	4	Vera Anisimova	Soviet Union	7.32	Q
5	4	Petra Sharp	West Germany	7.35	Q
6	1	Chantal Réga	France	7.36	Q
7	2	Lyudmila Kondratyeva	Soviet Union	7.42	Q
8	2	Heather Hunte	Great Britain	7.42	q
9	3	Lea Alaerts	Belgium	7.43	Q
10	4	Annie Alizé	France	7.44	q
11	1	Laura Miano	Italy	7.46	q
12	4	Mariya Sabeva	Bulgaria	7.51	q
13	2	Brigitte Haest	Austria	7.56	
14	2	Marisa Masullo	Italy	7.58	
14	3	Gisela Grässle	West Germany	7.58	
16	3	Laureen Beckles	France	7.62	

=== Semifinals ===
First 3 from each heat (Q) qualified directly for the final.

Rank	Heat	Name	Nationality	Time	Notes
1	1	Linda Haglund	Sweden	7.18	Q
2	2	Marlies Göhr	East Germany	7.26	Q
3	1	Vera Anisimova	Soviet Union	7.28	Q
3	2	Lyudmila Storozhkova	Soviet Union	7.28	Q
5	1	Petra Sharp	West Germany	7.35	Q
6	1	Heather Hunte	Great Britain	7.35	
7	2	Chantal Réga	France	7.37	Q
8	1	Annie Alizé	France	7.39	
9	2	Laura Miano	Italy	7.42	
10	2	Lyudmila Kondratyeva	Soviet Union	7.45	
11	2	Lea Alaerts	Belgium	7.46	
12	1	Mariya Sabeva	Bulgaria	7.49	

=== Final ===
Rank	Lane	Name	Nationality	Time	Notes
1st place, gold medalist(s)	1	Marlies Göhr	East Germany	7.12	WR
2nd place, silver medalist(s)	3	Linda Haglund	Sweden	7.13	NR
3rd place, bronze medalist(s)	6	Lyudmila Storozhkova	Soviet Union	7.27	
4	4	Vera Anisimova	Soviet Union	7.30	
5	2	Petra Sharp	West Germany	7.35	
6	5	Chantal Réga	France	7.38	
