= 1983 World Championships in Athletics – Women's 100 metres =

These are the official results of the Women's 100 metres event at the 1983 IAAF World Championships in Helsinki, Finland. There were a total number of 49 participating athletes, with seven qualifying heats and the final held on Monday 1983-08-08.

At the start, Koch and Ashford were out fast, and even until 40 metres into the race when Ashford pulled up with a hamstring injury. Göhr gained steadily on her teammate Koch, passing her at 80 meters. Sensing a further challenge from Diane Williams - who had crossed from her lane 6 to her left and front of Merlene Ottey in Lane 5, Koch leaned at the finish to hold on to second.

== Medalists ==
Gold	Marlies Göhr; East Germany (GDR)
Silver	Marita Koch; East Germany (GDR)
Bronze	Diane Williams; United States (USA)

== Records ==
Existing records at the start of the event.

World Record	Evelyn Ashford (USA)	10.79	Colorado Springs, USA	July 3, 1983
Championship Record	New event			

== Qualifying heats ==
- Held on Sunday 1983-08-07

RANK	HEAT 1 Wind: +1.1	TIME
1.	Olga Antonova (URS)	11.26 CR
2.	Marlies Göhr (GDR)	11.34
3.	Esmeralda de Jesus Garcia (BRA)	11.57
4.	Leleith Hodges (JAM)	11.58
5.	Radislava Šoborová (TCH)	11.80
6.	Mary Mensah (GHA)	12.26
7.	Rose Phillips-King (IVB)	12.87

RANK	HEAT 2 Wind: +0.9	TIME
1.	Marita Koch (GDR)	11.24 CR
2.	Angela Bailey (CAN)	11.31
3.	Rose-Aimée Bacoul (FRA)	11.38
4.	Dorthe A. Rasmussen (DEN)	11.42
5.	Monika Hirsch (FRG)	11.73
6.	Felicite Bada (BEN)	13.15
	Mesode Ruth Enang (CMR)	DNS

RANK	HEAT 3 Wind: +1.2	TIME
1.	Diane Williams (USA)	11.23 CR
2.	Helinä Marjamaa (FIN)	11.47
3.	Beverley Callender (GBR)	11.65
4.	Rufina Ubah (NGR)	11.67
5.	Esther Hope (TRI)	12.19
6.	June Caddle (BAR)	12.56
7.	Judith Nimpaye (BDI)	14.65

RANK	HEAT 4 Wind: +0.9	TIME
1.	Evelyn Ashford (USA)	11.15 CR
2.	Marina Romanova (URS)	11.54
3.	Pauline Davis (BAH)	11.56
4.	Els Vader (NED)	11.58
5.	Lena Möller (SWE)	11.62
6.	Amie Ndow (GAM)	12.63
	Semra Aksu (TUR)	DNS

RANK	HEAT 5 Wind: +1.6	TIME
1.	Merlene Ottey (JAM)	11.30
2.	Anelia Nuneva (BUL)	11.43
3.	Heather Oakes (GBR)	11.60
4.	Marie-France Loval (FRA)	11.71
5.	Walapa Tangjitnusorn (THA)	12.26
6.	Mo Myong-hee (KOR)	12.26
7.	Marisol García (NCA)	12.99

RANK	HEAT 6 Wind: +0.3	TIME
1.	Angella Taylor (CAN)	11.45
2.	Shirley Thomas (GBR)	11.54
3.	Nadezhda Georgieva (BUL)	11.58
4.	Ruperta Charles (ATG)	12.18
5.	Evelyne Farrell (AHO)	12.19
6.	Carmela Bolívar (PER)	12.31
7.	Pushpa Bhatta (NEP)	13.89

RANK	HEAT 7 Wind: +2.1	TIME
1.	Alice Brown (USA)	11.26w
2.	Silke Gladisch (GDR)	11.28w
3.	Laurence Bily (FRA)	11.53w
4.	Juliet Cuthbert (JAM)	11.58w
5.	Lydia de Vega (PHI)	11.74w
6.	Shen Shu-foog (TPE)	11.85w
7.	Koumba Kante (GUI)	13.37w

== Quarterfinals ==
- Held on Sunday 1983-08-07

RANK	HEAT 1 Wind: +0.8	TIME
1.	Anelia Nuneva (BUL)	11.20
2.	Angella Taylor (CAN)	11.24
3.	Alice Brown (USA)	11.30
4.	Olga Antonova (URS)	11.32
5.	Els Vader (NED)	11.56
6.	Leleith Hodges (JAM)	11.63
7.	Marie-France Loval (FRA)	11.79
8.	Monika Hirsch (FRG)	11.91

RANK	HEAT 2 Wind: -0.6	TIME
1.	Marita Koch (GDR)	11.25
2.	Merlene Ottey (JAM)	11.33
3.	Helinä Marjamaa (FIN)	11.34
4.	Nadezhda Georgieva (BUL)	11.43
5.	Beverley Callender (GBR)	11.48
6.	Esmeralda de Jesus Garcia (BRA)	11.64
7.	Dorthe A. Rasmussen (DEN)	11.67
8.	Lydia de Vega (PHI)	11.90

RANK	HEAT 3 Wind: -0.2	TIME
1.	Diane Williams (USA)	11.25
2.	Silke Gladisch (GDR)	11.36
3.	Rose-Aimée Bacoul (FRA)	11.42
4.	Shirley Thomas (GBR)	11.48
5.	Rufina Ubah (NGR)	11.60
6.	Pauline Davis (BAH)	11.62
7.	Juliet Cuthbert (JAM)	11.67
8.	Radislava Šoborová (TCH)	11.90

RANK	HEAT 4 Wind: -0.2	TIME
1.	Evelyn Ashford (USA)	11.11 CR
2.	Marlies Göhr (GDR)	11.16
3.	Angela Bailey (CAN)	11.36
4.	Heather Oakes (GBR)	11.57
5.	Marina Romanova (URS)	11.61
6.	Lena Möller (SWE)	11.75
7.	Laurence Bily (FRA)	11.76
8.	Shen Shu-foog (TPE)	12.17

== Semifinals ==
- Held on Monday 1983-08-08

RANK	HEAT 1 Wind: -0.5	TIME
1.	Marlies Göhr (GDR)	11.05 CR
2.	Angela Bailey (CAN)	11.18
3.	Diane Williams (USA)	11.21
4.	Helinä Marjamaa (FIN)	11.29
5.	Silke Gladisch (GDR)	11.30
6.	Anelia Nuneva (BUL)	11.31
7.	Alice Brown (USA)	11.33
8.	Shirley Thomas (GBR)	11.53

RANK	HEAT 2 Wind: -0.6	TIME
1.	Evelyn Ashford (USA)	10.99 CR
2.	Marita Koch (GDR)	11.08
3.	Angella Taylor (CAN)	11.22
4.	Merlene Ottey (JAM)	11.26
5.	Olga Antonova (URS)	11.30
6.	Nadezhda Georgieva (BUL)	11.36
7.	Heather Oakes (GBR)	11.50
8.	Rose-Aimée Bacoul (FRA)	11.59

== Final ==
RANK	FINAL Wind: -0.5	TIME
	Marlies Göhr (GDR)	10.97 CR
	Marita Koch (GDR)	11.02
	Diane Williams (USA)	11.06
4.	Merlene Ottey (JAM)	11.19
5.	Angela Bailey (CAN)	11.20
6.	Helinä Marjamaa (FIN)	11.24
7.	Angella Taylor (CAN)	11.30
	Evelyn Ashford (USA)	DNF
