= 1979 European Athletics Indoor Championships – Women's 60 metres =

The women's 60 metres event at the 1979 European Athletics Indoor Championships was held on 25 February in Vienna.

== Medalists ==
Gold	Silver	Bronze
Marlies Göhr; East Germany	Marita Koch; East Germany	Lyudmila Storozhkova; Soviet Union

== Results ==
=== Heats ===
First 2 from each heat (Q) and the next 4 fastest (q) qualified for the semifinals.

Rank	Heat	Name	Nationality	Time	Notes
1	4	Lyudmila Storozhkova	Soviet Union	7.27	Q
2	3	Sofka Popova	Bulgaria	7.28	Q
3	2	Marita Koch	East Germany	7.31	Q
4	1	Marlies Göhr	East Germany	7.32	Q
4	3	Linda Haglund	Sweden	7.32	Q
6	2	Lyudmila Maslakova	Soviet Union	7.34	Q
7	3	Wendy Clarke	Great Britain	7.35	q
8	3	Vera Anisimova	Soviet Union	7.36	q
9	2	Annie Alizé	France	7.38	q, PB
9	2	Helinä Laihorinne	Finland	7.38	q
9	4	Grażyna Rabsztyn	Poland	7.38	Q, PB
9	4	Elvira Possekel	West Germany	7.38	q, SB
13	1	Michelle Walsh	Ireland	7.44	Q
14	4	Lea Alaerts	Belgium	7.51	SB
15	1	Rita Meurer	West Germany	7.53	SB
16	4	Brigitte Haest	Austria	7.56	SB
17	1	Els Vader	Netherlands	7.57	PB
18	3	Silvia Schinzel	Austria	7.64	PB
19	2	Dijana Sokač	Yugoslavia	7.68	PB

=== Semifinals ===
First 2 from each heat (Q) qualified directly for the final.

Rank	Heat	Name	Nationality	Time	Notes
1	1	Marlies Göhr	East Germany	7.19	Q
2	3	Marita Koch	East Germany	7.23	Q
3	2	Sofka Popova	Bulgaria	7.26	Q, SB
4	1	Lyudmila Storozhkova	Soviet Union	7.27	Q
5	2	Wendy Clarke	Great Britain	7.28	Q
5	3	Linda Haglund	Sweden	7.28	Q, SB
7	2	Helinä Laihorinne	Finland	7.35	SB
7	3	Vera Anisimova	Soviet Union	7.35	
9	2	Lyudmila Maslakova	Soviet Union	7.37	
10	1	Elvira Possekel	West Germany	7.38	=SB
11	3	Michelle Walsh	Ireland	7.42	NJR
12	1	Annie Alizé	France	7.44	
12	3	Grażyna Rabsztyn	Poland	7.44	

=== Final ===
Rank	Name	Nationality	Time	Notes
1st place, gold medalist(s)	Marlies Göhr	East Germany	7.16	SB
2nd place, silver medalist(s)	Marita Koch	East Germany	7.19	
3rd place, bronze medalist(s)	Lyudmila Storozhkova	Soviet Union	7.22	PB
4	Wendy Clarke	Great Britain	7.26	SB
5	Linda Haglund	Sweden	7.28	=SB
6	Sofka Popova	Bulgaria	7.29	
