= 1978 European Athletics Championships – Women's 200 metres =

Women's 200 metres at the European Athletics Championships

The women's 200 metres at the 1978 European Athletics Championships was held in Prague, then Czechoslovakia, at Stadion Evžena Rošického on 31 August and 1 September 1978.

== Medalists ==
Gold	Lyudmila Kondratyeva; Soviet Union
Silver	Marlies Göhr; East Germany
Bronze	Carla Bodendorf; East Germany

== Results ==
=== Final ===
1 September Wind: -0.2 m/s

Rank	Name	Nationality	Time	Notes
1st place, gold medalist(s)	Lyudmila Kondratyeva	Soviet Union	22.52	
2nd place, silver medalist(s)	Marlies Göhr	East Germany	22.53	
3rd place, bronze medalist(s)	Carla Bodendorf	East Germany	22.64	
4	Monika Hamann	East Germany	22.76	
5	Chantal Réga	France	22.77	
6	Lyudmila Maslakova	Soviet Union	22.89	
7	Linda Haglund	Sweden	23.07	
8	Liliyana Ivanova	Bulgaria	23.23	

=== Semi-finals ===
31 August

==== Semi-final 1 ====
Wind: -0.2 m/s

Rank	Name	Nationality	Time	Notes
1	Marlies Göhr	East Germany	22.86	Q
2	Lyudmila Maslakova	Soviet Union	22.86	Q
3	Monika Hamann	East Germany	22.99	Q
4	Liliyana Ivanova	Bulgaria	23.12	Q
5	Sonia Lannaman	Great Britain	23.36	
6	Zofia Bielczyk	Poland	23.41	
7	Raymonde Naigre	France	23.89	
8	Claudia Steger	West Germany	24.18	

==== Semi-final 2 ====
Wind: -0.3 m/s

Rank	Name	Nationality	Time	Notes
1	Lyudmila Kondratyeva	Soviet Union	22.83	Q
2	Carla Bodendorf	East Germany	22.92	Q
3	Chantal Réga	France	22.98	Q
4	Linda Haglund	Sweden	23.11	Q
5	Kathy Smallwood	Great Britain	23.12	
6	Tatyana Prorochenko	Soviet Union	23.30	
7	Bev Goddard	Great Britain	23.37	
8	Irén Orosz	Hungary	23.56	

=== Heats ===
31 August

==== Heat 1 ====
Wind: -0.3 m/s

Rank	Name	Nationality	Time	Notes
1	Tatyana Prorochenko	Soviet Union	23.23	Q
2	Kathy Smallwood	Great Britain	23.54	Q
3	Marlies Göhr	East Germany	23.73	Q
4	Claudia Steger	West Germany	23.96	Q
5	Michelle Walsh	Ireland	23.99	
6	Radislava Šoborová	Czechoslovakia	24.55	

==== Heat 2 ====
Wind: 0 m/s

Rank	Name	Nationality	Time	Notes
1	Lyudmila Kondratyeva	Soviet Union	23.11	Q
2	Monika Hamann	East Germany	23.35	Q
3	Irén Orosz	Hungary	23.46	Q
4	Sonia Lannaman	Great Britain	23.48	Q
5	Dagmar Schenten	West Germany	23.70	
6	Helinä Laihorinne	Finland	23.84	
7	Tilly Verhoef	Netherlands	24.12	

==== Heat 3 ====
Wind: 0 m/s

Rank	Name	Nationality	Time	Notes
1	Chantal Réga	France	23.26	Q
2	Linda Haglund	Sweden	23.38	Q
3	Zofia Bielczyk	Poland	23.40	Q
4	Bev Goddard	Great Britain	23.54	Q
5	Marisa Masullo	Italy	23.62	
6	Silvia Schinzel	Austria	24.30	

==== Heat 4 ====
Wind: 0.5 m/s

Rank	Name	Nationality	Time	Notes
1	Lyudmila Maslakova	Soviet Union	22.92	Q
2	Liliyana Ivanova	Bulgaria	22.93	Q
3	Carla Bodendorf	East Germany	23.11	Q
4	Raymonde Naigre	France	23.56	Q
5	Jolanta Stalmach	Poland	23.96	
6	Ellie Henzen	Netherlands	23.97	

== Participation ==
According to an unofficial count, 25 athletes from 15 countries participated in the event.

- Austria (1)
- Bulgaria (1)
- Czechoslovakia (1)
- East Germany (3)
- Finland (1)
- France (2)
- Hungary (1)
- Ireland (1)
- Italy (1)
- Netherlands (2)
- Poland (2)
- Soviet Union (3)
- Sweden (1)
- Great Britain (3)
- West Germany (2)
