= Athletics at the 1979 Summer Universiade – Women's 100 metres =

The women's 100 metres event at the 1979 Summer Universiade was held at the Estadio Olimpico Universitario in Mexico City on 8 and 9 September 1979.

== Medalists ==
| Gold | Silver | Bronze |
|---|---|---|
| Marlies Göhr; East Germany | Kathy Smallwood; Great Britain | Beverley Goddard; Great Britain |

== Results ==
=== Heats ===
Wind:
Heat 1: +0.5 m/s, Heat 2: +0.2 m/s, Heat 3: ? m/s, Heat 4: +1.4 m/s

| Rank | Heat | Athlete | Nationality | Time | Notes |
|---|---|---|---|---|---|
| 1 | 1 | Marlies Göhr | East Germany | 11.25 | Q |
| 2 | 2 | Helinä Laihorinne | Finland | 11.35 | Q |
| 3 | 4 | Kathy Smallwood | Great Britain | 11.37 | Q |
| 4 | 4 | Vera Anisimova | Soviet Union | 11.44 | Q |
| 5 | 3 | Beverley Goddard | Great Britain | 11.47 | Q |
| 6 | 1 | Marisa Masullo | Italy | 11.58 | Q, PB |
| 7 | 2 | Olga Korotkova | Soviet Union | 11.60 | Q |
| 8 | 3 | Laura Miano | Italy | 11.63 | Q |
| 9 | 1 | Claudine Mas | France | 11.65 | Q |
| 9 | 2 | Els Vader | Netherlands | 11.65 | Q |
| 11 | 2 | Anne-Marie Heugas | France | 11.75 | q |
| 12 | 3 | Cornelia Schniggendiller | West Germany | 11.78 | Q |
| 13 | 3 | Elly Henzen | Netherlands | 11.87 | q |
| 14 | 1 | Chantal Desrosiers | Canada | 12.06 | q |
| 15 | 4 | Judy Bell-Gam | Nigeria | 12.10 | Q |
| 16 | 1 | Fosa Ibini | Nigeria | 12.15 | q |
| 17 | 4 | Angela Doyle | United States | 12.16 | |
| 18 | 2 | Hanitra Rabarivola | Madagascar | 12.20 | |
| 19 | 3 | Alma Vázquez | Mexico | 12.21 | |
| 20 | 4 | Willette Lalasoariravaka | Madagascar | 12.39 | |
| 21 | 2 | Mayra Figueroa | Guatemala | 12.47 | |
| 22 | 3 | Anh Tran Thi Ngoc | Vietnam | 12.80 | |
| 23 | 1 | Alejandra Flores | Mexico | 12.89 | |
| 24 | 4 | Than Van Tran | Vietnam | 12.89 | |

=== Semifinals ===
Wind:
Heat 1: 0.0 m/s, Heat 2: 0.0 m/s

| Rank | Heat | Athlete | Nationality | Time | Notes |
|---|---|---|---|---|---|
| 1 | 1 | Marlies Göhr | East Germany | 11.00 | Q, UR |
| 2 | 1 | Beverley Goddard | Great Britain | 11.22 | Q |
| 3 | 2 | Kathy Smallwood | Great Britain | 11.30 | Q |
| 4 | 1 | Vera Anisimova | Soviet Union | 11.42 | Q |
| 5 | 1 | Laura Miano | Italy | 11.43 | Q |
| 6 | 2 | Helinä Laihorinne | Finland | 11.44 | Q |
| 7 | 2 | Marisa Masullo | Italy | 11.56 | Q |
| 8 | 2 | Olga Korotkova | Soviet Union | 11.67 | Q |
| 9 | 2 | Claudine Mas | France | 11.69 | |
| 10 | 1 | Cornelia Schniggendiller | West Germany | 11.71 | |
| 11 | 1 | Els Vader | Netherlands | 11.76 | |
| 12 | 1 | Elly Henzen | Netherlands | 11.82 | |
| 13 | 2 | Anne-Marie Heugas | France | 11.84 | |
| 14 | 2 | Chantal Desrosiers | Canada | 12.08 | |
| 15 | 1 | Fosa Ibini | Nigeria | 12.19 | |
| 16 | 2 | Judy Bell-Gam | Nigeria | 12.36 | |

=== Final ===
Wind: 0.0 m/s

| Rank | Athlete | Nationality | Time | Notes |
|---|---|---|---|---|
| 1st place, gold medalist(s) | Marlies Göhr | East Germany | 11.00 | =UR |
| 2nd place, silver medalist(s) | Kathy Smallwood | Great Britain | 11.27 | |
| 3rd place, bronze medalist(s) | Beverley Goddard | Great Britain | 11.32 | |
| 4 | Helinä Laihorinne | Finland | 11.33 | |
| 5 | Vera Anisimova | Soviet Union | 11.39 | |
| 6 | Olga Korotkova | Soviet Union | 11.56 | |
| 7 | Laura Miano | Italy | 11.62 | |
| 8 | Marisa Masullo | Italy | 11.68 | |
