= 1982 European Athletics Indoor Championships – Women's 60 metres =

The women's 60 metres event at the 1982 European Athletics Indoor Championships was held on 7 March.

== Medalists ==
Gold	Silver	Bronze
Marlies Göhr; East Germany	Sofka Popova; Bulgaria	Wendy Hoyte; Great Britain

== Results ==
=== Heats ===
First 3 from each heat (Q) and the next 3 fastest (q) qualified for the semifinals.

Rank	Heat	Name	Nationality	Time	Notes
1	2	Sofka Popova	Bulgaria	7.18	Q
2	2	Wendy Hoyte	Great Britain	7.21	Q
3	1	Marlies Göhr	East Germany	7.24	Q
4	2	Lyudmila Kondratyeva	Soviet Union	7.29	Q
5	1	Helinä Laihorinne	Finland	7.30	Q
6	1	Marie-Christine Cazier	France	7.34	Q
6	3	Els Vader	Netherlands	7.34	Q
8	3	Heidi-Elke Gaugel	West Germany	7.35	Q
9	3	Laurence Bily	France	7.38	Q
10	1	Dorthe Rasmussen	Denmark	7.47	q
11	1	Irén Orosz	Hungary	7.54	q
11	3	Yordanka Donkova	Bulgaria	7.54	q
13	2	Antonella Capriotti	Italy	7.55	

=== Semifinals ===
First 3 from each semifinal qualified directly (Q) for the final.

Rank	Heat	Name	Nationality	Time	Notes
1	2	Marlies Göhr	East Germany	7.16	Q
2	2	Wendy Hoyte	Great Britain	7.21	Q
3	1	Sofka Popova	Bulgaria	7.25	Q
4	2	Lyudmila Kondratyeva	Soviet Union	7.27	Q
5	1	Marie-Christine Cazier	France	7.28	Q
6	1	Helinä Laihorinne	Finland	7.32	Q
7	1	Els Vader	Netherlands	7.34	
8	2	Laurence Bily	France	7.37	
9	1	Heidi-Elke Gaugel	West Germany	7.38	
10	2	Dorthe Rasmussen	Denmark	7.45	PB
11	1	Irén Orosz	Hungary	7.52	
12	2	Yordanka Donkova	Bulgaria	7.53	

=== Final ===
Rank	Name	Nationality	Time	Notes
1st place, gold medalist(s)	Marlies Göhr	East Germany	7.11	
2nd place, silver medalist(s)	Sofka Popova	Bulgaria	7.19	
3rd place, bronze medalist(s)	Wendy Hoyte	Great Britain	7.27	
4	Lyudmila Kondratyeva	Soviet Union	7.31	
5	Marie-Christine Cazier	France	7.35	
6	Helinä Laihorinne	Finland	7.36	
