= Athletics at the 1977 Summer Universiade – Women's 100 metres =

The women's 100 metres event at the 1977 Summer Universiade was held at the Vasil Levski National Stadium in Sofia on 19 and 20 August.

== Medalists ==
Gold	Silver	Bronze
Lyudmila Storozhkova; Soviet Union	Andrea Lynch; Great Britain	Silvia Chivás; Cuba

== Results ==
=== Heats ===
Held on 19 August

Wind:
Heat 1: ? m/s, Heat 2: ? m/s, Heat 3: -0.6 m/s, Heat 4: -0.4 m/s

Rank	Heat	Athlete	Nationality	Time	Notes
1	1	Andrea Lynch	Great Britain	11.31	Q
2	1	Lyudmila Maslakova	Soviet Union	11.32	Q
3	1	Emma Sulter	France	11.47	Q
4	1	Rita Bottiglieri	Italy	11.52	q
5	1	Cornelia Schnigendiller	West Germany	11.82	
6	1	Mariti de Voeght	Belgium	12.1	
7	1	Salaman	Kuwait	16.5	
1	2	Lyudmila Storozhkova	Soviet Union	11.32	Q
2	2	Ivanka Valkova	Bulgaria	11.62	Q
3	2	Paola Bolognesi	Italy	11.85	Q
4	2	Helena Fliśnik	Poland	11.85	
5	2	Vilma Paris	Puerto Rico	12.45	
6	2	L. Abbas	Kuwait	14.4	
1	3	Silvia Chivás	Cuba	11.12	Q
2	3	Chantal Réga	France	11.45	Q
3	3	Veronica Buta	Romania	11.66	Q
4	3	Margot Howe	Canada	11.71	q
5	3	Renaye Bowen	United States	11.84	
6	3	Alev Tanyeli	Turkey	12.4	
7	3	Kadiatou Touré	Guinea	14.0	
1	4	Ewa Długołęcka	Poland	11.35	Q
2	4	Patty Loverock	Canada	11.39	Q
3	4	Isabel Taylor	Cuba	11.42	Q
4	4	Sofka Popova	Bulgaria	11.54	q
5	4	Barbara Jordan	Australia	11.63	q
6	4	Nerva Bultron	Puerto Rico	11.8	
7	4	Carolina Rieuwpassa	Indonesia	12.0	

=== Semifinals ===
Held on 20 August

Wind:
Heat 1: +1.2 m/s, Heat 2: +1.4 m/s

Rank	Heat	Athlete	Nationality	Time	Notes
1	1	Silvia Chivás	Cuba	11.16	Q
2	2	Lyudmila Storozhkova	Soviet Union	11.27	Q
3	1	Lyudmila Maslakova	Soviet Union	11.31	Q
4	2	Andrea Lynch	Great Britain	11.38	Q
5	2	Chantal Réga	France	11.48	Q
6	1	Ivanka Valkova	Bulgaria	11.52	Q
7	1	Ewa Długołęcka	Poland	11.53	Q
8	2	Patty Loverock	Canada	11.54	Q
9	2	Rita Bottiglieri	Italy	11.58	
10	1	Emma Sulter	France	11.60	
11	2	Isabel Taylor	Cuba	11.67	
12	2	Sofka Popova	Bulgaria	11.77	
13	2	Veronica Buta	Romania	11.81	
14	1	Margaret Howe	Canada	11.83	
15	1	Paola Bolognesi	Italy	11.85	
16	1	Barbara Jordan	Australia	11.90	

=== Final ===
Held on 20 August

Wind: +0.8 m/s

Rank	Athlete	Nationality	Time	Notes
1st place, gold medalist(s)	Lyudmila Storozhkova	Soviet Union	11.21	NR
2nd place, silver medalist(s)	Andrea Lynch	Great Britain	11.22	
3rd place, bronze medalist(s)	Silvia Chivás	Cuba	11.23	
4	Lyudmila Maslakova	Soviet Union	11.31	
5	Ewa Długołęcka	Poland	11.50	
6	Ivanka Valkova	Bulgaria	11.52	
7	Patty Loverock	Canada	11.58	
8	Chantal Réga	France	11.61	
