= 1978 UK Athletics Championships =

British athletics championships

- Dates: 15 & 16 July 1978
- Host city: Edinburgh, Scotland
- Venue: Meadowbank Stadium
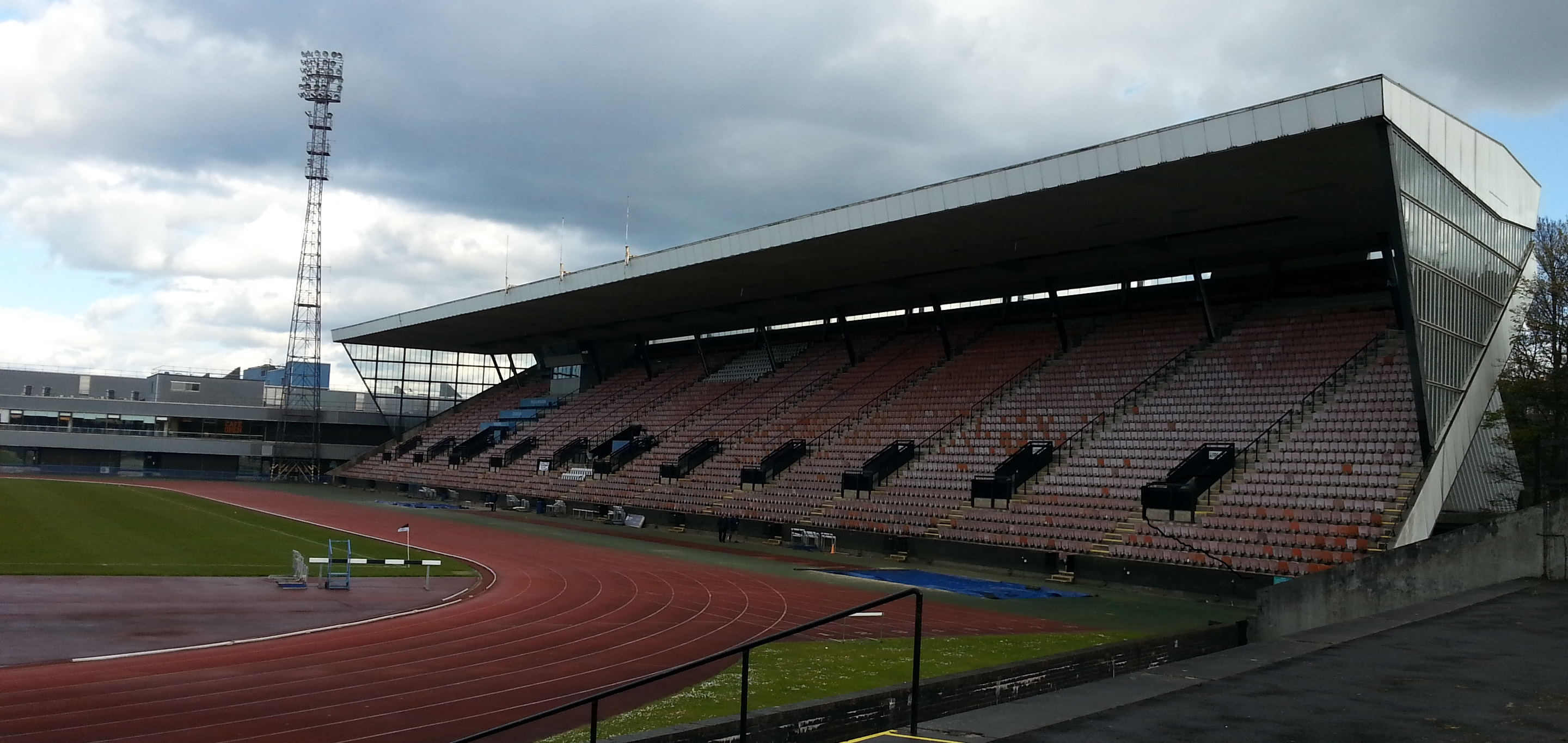
- Level: Senior
- Type: Outdoor

The 1978 UK Athletics Championships , sponsored by Kraft, was the national championship in outdoor track and field for the United Kingdom held at Meadowbank Stadium, Edinburgh, Scotland.

It was the second edition of the competition limited to British athletes only, launched as an alternative to the AAA Championships, which was open to foreign competitors. However, because the calibre of national competition remained greater at the AAA event, the UK Championships this year were not considered the principal national championship event by some statisticians, such as the National Union of Track Statisticians (NUTS). Many of the athletes below also competed at the 1978 AAA Championships.

== Summary ==
Sonia Lannaman defended her 100 metres/200 metres sprint double from 1977. Allan Wells took his first sprint double on the men's side and Jane Colebrook managed a double in the 400 metres and 800 metres. Athletes to retain their titles from 1977 included Lannaman, sprint hurdlers Berwyn Price and Sharon Colyear, Geoff Capes (men's shot put), Meg Ritchie (women's discus) and Tessa Sanderson (women's javelin).

The main international track and field competition for the United Kingdom that year was the 1978 European Athletics Championships. Two athletes at the UK event won individual medals at European level: the men's 800 m champion Sebastian Coe was a European bronze medallist and women's javelin throw champion Sanderson was European runner-up. The top three in the UK women's 200 m (Beverley Goddard, Kathy Smallwood, and Lannaman) plus hurdles champion Colyear teamed up to take a 4 × 100 metres relay European silver.

The four countries of the United Kingdom competed separately at the Commonwealth Games that year as well, and UK champions who won there were Wells, Price, Lannaman, Capes, Sanderson, Paula Fudge (3000 m), Sue Reeve (long jump). The same relay quartet of the European Championships also took the Commonwealth Games title for England.

== Medals ==
=== Men ===
Event	Gold		Silver		Bronze	
100 metres	(Scotland) Allan Wells	10.15	(Scotland) Drew McMaster	10.55	Steve Green	10.57
200 metres	(Scotland) Allan Wells	20.70	(Scotland) David Jenkins	21.43	(Scotland) Drew McMaster	21.56
400 metres	Richard Ashton	46.35	Danny Laing	46.97	Glen Cohen	47.09
800 metres	Sebastian Coe	1:47.14	(Scotland) Peter Hoffmann	1:48.30	(Scotland) Paul Forbes	1:49.09
1500 metres	(Scotland) John Robson	3:43.87	(Scotland) Frank Clement	3:44.38	(Scotland) Graham Williamson	3:44.88
5,000 metres	Mike McLeod	13:25.20	Brendan Foster	13:25.41	Malcolm Prince	13:36.63
10,000 metres	Dave Black	28:34.77	Geoff Smith	28:37.31	Bernie Ford	28:40.45
110 metres hurdles (wind: +4.1 m/s)	(Wales) Berwyn Price	13.93w	Mark Holtom	14.10w	(Scotland) David Wilson	14.43w
400 metres hurdles	Bill Hartley	51.03	Gary Oakes	51.09	Steve James	51.83
3000 metres steeplechase	Dennis Coates	8:25.98	John Davies	8:26.64	(Scotland) Ian Gilmour	8:31.09
High jump	Mark Naylor	2.15 m	(Scotland) Brian Burgess	2.15 m	Vincent Clemmens	2.10 m
Pole vault	Keith Stock	5.25 m	Jeff Gutteridge	5.20 m	Allan Williams	5.10 m
Long jump	Ken Cocks	7.56 m	Tony Henry	7.47 m	Colin Mitchell	7.30 m
Triple jump	Keith Connor	16.66w m	Aston Moore	16.48w m	Chris Colman	16.17w m
Shot put	Geoff Capes	19.80 m	Mike Winch	17.76 m	Bob Dale	16.93 m
Discus throw	Peter Gordon	54.66 m	Richard Slaney	54.24 m	Geoff Capes	54.20 m
Hammer throw	(Scotland) Chris Black	69.10 m	Paul Dickenson	68.28 m	Jim Whitehead	65.30 m
Javelin	David Ottley	76.62 m	John Trower	69.16 m	Gareth Brooks	66.66 m

=== Women ===
Event	Gold		Silver		Bronze	
100 metres (wind: +4.3 m/s)	Sonia Lannaman	11.24w	Beverley Goddard	11.30w	Wendy Clarke	11.38w
200 metres	Sonia Lannaman	23.16	Beverley Goddard	23.27	Kathy Smallwood	23.36
400 metres	Jane Colebrook	53.80	Joslyn Hoyte	54.03	Liz Eddy	54.10
800 metres	Jane Colebrook	2:03.31	Janet Prictoe	2:04.78	Lesley Kiernan	2:05.14
1500 metres	(Wales) Hilary Hollick	4:14.08	Ruth Smeeth	4:14.58	Sandra Arthurton	4:17.06
3000 metres	Paula Fudge	8:53.63	Glynis Penny	9:06.39	Kathryn Binns	9:15.86
100 metres hurdles	Sharon Colyear	13.67	Shirley Strong	13.97	Blondelle Caines	14.00
400 metres hurdles	(Scotland) Liz Sutherland	58.12	Sue Smith	59.32	Diane Heath	59.64
High jump	Gillian Hitchen	1.85 m	Tonia Phillpots	1.75 m	Val Rutter	1.75 m
Long jump	Sue Reeve	6.43w m	Sue Hearnshaw	6.39 m	Barbara Clarke	6.22 m
Shot put	Judy Oakes	15.96 m	Angela Littlewood	15.71 m	Vanessa Redford	14.81 m
Discus throw	(Scotland) Meg Ritchie	57.20 m	Janet Thompson	52.38 m	Lesley Mallin	50.28 m
Javelin	Tessa Sanderson	59.52 m	Fatima Whitbread	52.52 m	Anne Farquhar	49.48 m
