= 1980 European Athletics Indoor Championships – Women's 60 metres =

The women's 60 metres event at the 1980 European Athletics Indoor Championships was held on 2 March in Sindelfingen.

== Medalists ==
Gold	Silver	Bronze
Sofka Popova; Bulgaria	Linda Haglund; Sweden	Lyudmila Kondratyeva; Soviet Union

== Results ==
=== Heats ===
First 3 from each heat (Q) and the next 3 fastest (q) qualified for the semifinals.

Rank	Heat	Name	Nationality	Time	Notes
1	1	Linda Haglund	Sweden	7.16	Q
1	2	Sofka Popova	Bulgaria	7.16	Q
3	3	Zofia Bielczyk	Poland	7.30	Q
4	3	Lyudmila Kondratyeva	Soviet Union	7.31	Q
5	1	Vera Anisimova	Soviet Union	7.38	Q
5	2	Helinä Laihorinne	Finland	7.38	Q
7	1	Heide-Elke Gaugel	West Germany	7.42	Q
8	1	Marisa Masullo	Italy	7.42	q
9	1	Grażyna Rabsztyn	Poland	7.42	q
10	2	Olga Korotkova	Soviet Union	7.43	Q
11	3	Elke Vollmer	West Germany	7.45	Q
12	2	Monika Hirsch	West Germany	7.46	q
13	1	Jacky Curtet	France	7.53	
14	3	Brigitte Haest	Austria	7.54	
15	3	Michelle Walsh	Ireland	7.54	
16	2	Liliane Meganck	Belgium	7.57	
17	2	Elżbieta Rabsztyn	Poland	7.60	
18	3	Mona Evjen	Norway	7.63	

=== Semifinals ===
First 3 from each semifinal qualified directly (Q) for the final.

Rank	Heat	Name	Nationality	Time	Notes
1	2	Sofka Popova	Bulgaria	7.11	Q
2	1	Linda Haglund	Sweden	7.15	Q
3	1	Lyudmila Kondratyeva	Soviet Union	7.27	Q
4	1	Helinä Laihorinne	Finland	7.29	Q
4	2	Zofia Bielczyk	Poland	7.29	Q
6	2	Vera Anisimova	Soviet Union	7.32	Q
7	2	Marisa Masullo	Italy	7.33	
8	2	Heide-Elke Gaugel	West Germany	7.39	
9	1	Grażyna Rabsztyn	Poland	7.40	
10	1	Olga Korotkova	Soviet Union	7.42	
11	2	Monika Hirsch	West Germany	7.47	
12	1	Elke Vollmer	West Germany	7.50	

=== Final ===
Rank	Name	Nationality	Time	Notes
1st place, gold medalist(s)	Sofka Popova	Bulgaria	7.11	
2nd place, silver medalist(s)	Linda Haglund	Sweden	7.14	
3rd place, bronze medalist(s)	Lyudmila Kondratyeva	Soviet Union	7.31	
4	Zofia Bielczyk	Poland	7.34	
5	Vera Anisimova	Soviet Union	7.35	
6	Helinä Laihorinne	Finland	7.37	
