= 1986 European Athletics Championships – Women's 100 metres =

Women's 100 metres at the 1986 European Athletics Championships
- Venue: Neckarstadion
- Location: Stuttgart
- Dates: 26 August (heats); 27 August (semifinals & final)
- Competitors: 24 from 13 nations
- Winning time: 10.91

Medalists
gold medal	Marlies Göhr	East Germany
silver medal	Anelia Nuneva	Bulgaria
bronze medal	Nelli Cooman	Netherlands

The women's 100 metres event at the 1986 European Athletics Championships was held in Stuttgart, then West Germany, at Neckarstadion on 26 and 27 August 1986.

== Participation ==
According to an unofficial count, 24 athletes from 13 countries participated in the event.

- Bulgaria (2)
- East Germany (3)
- Finland (1)
- France (1)
- Netherlands (3)
- Norway (1)
- Poland (1)
- Portugal (1)
- Soviet Union (3)
- Sweden (1)
- Switzerland (1)
- Great Britain (3)
- West Germany (3)

== Results ==
=== Heats ===
26 August

==== Heat 1 ====
Rank	Name	Nationality	Time	Notes
1	Ingrid Auerswald	East Germany	11.15	Q
2	Anelia Nuneva	Bulgaria	11.21	Q
3	Heather Oakes	Great Britain	11.28	Q
4	Irina Slyusar	Soviet Union	11.38	Q
5	Laurence Bily	France	11.46	Q
6	Ulrike Sarvari	West Germany	11.55	q
7	Vroni Werthmüller	Switzerland	11.62	
8	Martha Grossenbacher	Netherlands	11.65	
			Wind: -1.4 m/s	

==== Heat 2 ====
Rank	Name	Nationality	Time	Notes
1	Marlies Göhr	East Germany	11.06	Q
2	Els Vader	Netherlands	11.30	Q
3	Antonina Nastoburko	Soviet Union	11.30	Q
4	Paula Dunn	Great Britain	11.31	Q
5	Resi März	West Germany	11.56	Q
6	Jolanta Janota	Poland	11.69	
7	Virginia Gomes	Portugal	11.80	
8	Sisko Hanhijoki	Finland	12.01	
			Wind: -0.1 m/s	

==== Heat 3 ====
Rank	Name	Nationality	Time	Notes
1	Nelli Cooman	Netherlands	11.12	NR, Q
2	Silke Gladisch	East Germany	11.16	Q
3	Heidi-Elke Gaugel	West Germany	11.28	Q
4	Olga Zolotaryova	Soviet Union	11.36	Q
5	Sandra Whittaker	Great Britain	11.51	Q
6	Nadezhda Georgieva	Bulgaria	11.56	
7	Sølvi Olsen	Norway	11.89	
8	Lena Möller	Sweden	12.04	
			Wind: -1.2 m/s	

=== Semi-finals ===
27 August

==== Semi-final 1 ====
Rank	Name	Nationality	Time	Notes
1	Nelli Cooman	Netherlands	11.14	Q
2	Ingrid Auerswald	East Germany	11.16	Q
3	Heidi-Elke Gaugel	West Germany	11.25	Q
4	Olga Zolotaryova	Soviet Union	11.28	Q
5	Heather Oakes	Great Britain	11.29	
6	Antonina Nastoburko	Soviet Union	11.33	
7	Sandra Whittaker	Great Britain	11.51	
8	Ulrike Sarvari	West Germany	11.53	
			Wind: +0.7 m/s	

==== Semi-final 2 ====
Rank	Name	Nationality	Time	Notes
1	Marlies Göhr	East Germany	10.98	CR, Q
2	Silke Gladisch	East Germany	11.05	Q
3	Anelia Nuneva	Bulgaria	11.08	Q
4	Paula Dunn	Great Britain	11.27	Q
5	Irina Slyusar	Soviet Union	11.35	
6	Laurence Bily	France	11.49	
7	Resi März	West Germany	11.60	
	Els Vader	Netherlands	DQ	
			Wind: +1.2 m/s	

=== Final ===
27 August

Rank	Name	Nationality	Time	Notes
1st place, gold medalist(s)	Marlies Göhr	East Germany	10.91	CR
2nd place, silver medalist(s)	Anelia Nuneva	Bulgaria	11.04	NR
3rd place, bronze medalist(s)	Nelli Cooman	Netherlands	11.08	NR
4	Silke Gladisch	East Germany	11.09	
5	Ingrid Auerswald	East Germany	11.11	
6	Olga Zolotaryova	Soviet Union	11.23	
7	Paula Dunn	Great Britain	11.25	
8	Heidi-Elke Gaugel	West Germany	11.26	
			Wind: +0.8 m/s	
