= 1992 European Athletics Indoor Championships – Women's 60 metres =

The women's 60 metres event at the 1992 European Athletics Indoor Championships was held in Palasport di Genova on 29 February.

== Medalists ==
Gold	Silver	Bronze
Zhanna Tarnopolskaya; Unified Team	Anelia Nuneva; Bulgaria	Nadezhda Roshchupkina; Unified Team

== Results ==
=== Heats ===
First 3 from each heat (Q) and the next 7 fastest (q) qualified for the semifinals.

Rank	Heat	Name	Nationality	Time	Notes
1	3	Zhanna Tarnopolskaya	Unified Team	7.27	Q
2	3	Laurence Bily	France	7.33	Q
3	2	Anelia Nuneva	Bulgaria	7.35	Q
4	2	Sanna Hernesniemi	Finland	7.35	Q
5	1	Odiah Sidibé	France	7.36	Q
6	3	Sara Wüest	Switzerland	7.37	Q
7	2	Martha Grossenbacher	Switzerland	7.40	Q
8	2	Valérie Jean-Charles	France	7.40	q
9	1	Nadezhda Roshchupkina	Unified Team	7.42	Q
10	1	Andrea Philipp	Germany	7.42	Q
11	2	Lara Sinico	Italy	7.43	q
12	1	Sabine Tröger	Austria	7.47	q
12	3	Monika Špičková	Czechoslovakia	7.47	q
14	3	Marisa Masullo	Italy	7.48	q
15	3	Sølvi Olsen	Norway	7.51	q
16	1	Michelle Carroll	Ireland	7.52	q
17	1	Karin de Lange	Netherlands	7.52	
18	1	Petra Osterwalder	Switzerland	7.53	
19	2	Bettina Zipp	Germany	7.54	
20	2	Virgínia Gomes	Portugal	7.65	
21	3	Cristina Regalo	Portugal	7.70	
22	3	Fatma Yüksel	Turkey	8.03	
23	1	Sandra Vidal	Andorra	8.21	

=== Semifinals ===
First 4 from each semifinal qualified directly (Q) for the final.

Rank	Heat	Name	Nationality	Time	Notes
1	2	Zhanna Tarnopolskaya	Unified Team	7.23	Q
2	1	Odiah Sidibé	France	7.29	Q
3	1	Anelia Nuneva	Bulgaria	7.29	Q
4	1	Nadezhda Roshchupkina	Unified Team	7.34	Q
4	2	Laurence Bily	France	7.34	Q
6	2	Sanna Hernesniemi	Finland	7.35	Q
7	2	Martha Grossenbacher	Switzerland	7.35	Q
8	1	Sabine Tröger	Austria	7.36	Q
9	2	Andrea Philipp	Germany	7.37	
10	1	Sara Wüest	Switzerland	7.38	
11	1	Marisa Masullo	Italy	7.39	
12	2	Lara Sinico	Italy	7.43	
13	1	Valérie Jean-Charles	France	7.50	
14	2	Sølvi Olsen	Norway	7.53	
15	1	Michelle Carroll	Ireland	7.64	
16	2	Monika Špičková	Czechoslovakia	7.76	

=== Final ===
Rank	Lane	Name	Nationality	Time	Notes
1st place, gold medalist(s)	3	Zhanna Tarnopolskaya	Unified Team	7.24	
2nd place, silver medalist(s)	4	Anelia Nuneva	Bulgaria	7.29	
3rd place, bronze medalist(s)	1	Nadezhda Roshchupkina	Unified Team	7.31	
4	5	Laurence Bily	France	7.33	
5	6	Odiah Sidibé	France	7.34	
6	2	Sanna Hernesniemi	Finland	7.39	
7	8	Martha Grossenbacher	Switzerland	7.40	
8	1	Sabine Tröger	Austria	7.42	
