= 1987 European Athletics Indoor Championships – Women's 60 metres =

The women's 60 metres event at the 1987 European Athletics Indoor Championships was held on 22 February.

== Medalists ==
Gold	Silver	Bronze
Nelli Fiere-Cooman; Netherlands	Anelia Nuneva; Bulgaria	Marlies Göhr; East Germany

== Results ==
=== Heats ===
First 2 from each heat (Q) and the next 4 fastest (q) qualified for the semifinals.

Rank	Heat	Name	Nationality	Time	Notes
1	3	Nelli Fiere-Cooman	Netherlands	7.11	Q
2	2	Marlies Göhr	East Germany	7.17	Q
3	2	Els Vader	Netherlands	7.17	Q
4	1	Anelia Nuneva	Bulgaria	7.20	Q
5	4	Wendy Hoyte	Great Britain	7.21	Q
6	2	Paula Dunn	Great Britain	7.32	q
6	4	Ulrike Sarvari	West Germany	7.32	Q
8	3	Laurence Bily	France	7.34	Q
9	1	Joan Baptiste	Great Britain	7.37	Q
10	2	Magali Martin	France	7.41	q
10	3	Martha Grossenbacher-Derby	Switzerland	7.41	q
12	4	Magali Séguin	France	7.44	q
13	1	Virginia Gomes	Portugal	7.47	
13	2	Ingrid Verbruggen	Belgium	7.47	NR
13	4	Sisko Markkanen	Finland	7.47	
16	4	Edine van Heezik	Netherlands	7.48	
17	1	Yolanda Díaz	Spain	7.59	
	3	Monika Hirsch	West Germany	DNF	
	1	Mette Husbyn	Norway	DNS	
	3	Marina Skourti	Greece	DNS	

=== Semifinals ===
First 3 from each semifinal qualified directly (Q) for the final.

Rank	Heat	Name	Nationality	Time	Notes
1	1	Nelli Fiere-Cooman	Netherlands	7.02	Q
2	1	Anelia Nuneva	Bulgaria	7.03	Q, NR
3	2	Marlies Göhr	East Germany	7.07	Q
4	2	Els Vader	Netherlands	7.11	Q
5	1	Wendy Hoyte	Great Britain	7.20	Q
6	2	Paula Dunn	Great Britain	7.23	Q
7	1	Laurence Bily	France	7.32	
8	2	Magali Martin	France	7.36	
9	2	Ulrike Sarvari	West Germany	7.37	
10	1	Joan Baptiste	Great Britain	7.41	
11	1	Magali Séguin	France	7.41	
12	2	Martha Grossenbacher-Derby	Switzerland	7.44	

=== Final ===
Rank	Lane	Name	Nationality	Time	Notes
1st place, gold medalist(s)	3	Nelli Fiere-Cooman	Netherlands	7.01	
2nd place, silver medalist(s)	5	Anelia Nuneva	Bulgaria	7.06	
3rd place, bronze medalist(s)	4	Marlies Göhr	East Germany	7.12	
4	6	Els Vader	Netherlands	7.19	
5	1	Wendy Hoyte	Great Britain	7.27	
6	2	Paula Dunn	Great Britain	7.28	
