= 1983 European Athletics Indoor Championships – Women's 60 metres =

The women's 60 metres event at the 1983 European Athletics Indoor Championships was held on 6 March.

== Medalists ==
Gold	Silver	Bronze
Marlies Göhr; East Germany	Silke Gladisch; East Germany	Marisa Masullo; Italy

== Results ==
=== Heats ===
First 2 from each heat (Q) and the next 2 fastest (q) qualified for the final.

Rank	Heat	Name	Nationality	Time	Notes
1	2	Marlies Göhr	East Germany	7.20	Q
2	2	Marisa Masullo	Italy	7.23	Q
3	1	Silke Gladisch	East Germany	7.26	Q
4	2	Marie-Christine Cazier	France	7.30	q
5	1	Bev Kinch	Great Britain	7.31	Q
6	1	Bärbel Schölzel	East Germany	7.35	q
7	2	Sabine Klösters	West Germany	7.42	
8	1	Štěpánka Sokolová	Czechoslovakia	7.43	
9	1	Laurence Bily	France	7.46	
10	1	Laura Miano	Italy	7.52	
12	2	Semra Aksu	Turkey	7.82	
	2	Raisa Makhova	Soviet Union	DNS	

=== Final ===
Rank	Lane	Name	Nationality	Time	Notes
1st place, gold medalist(s)	4	Marlies Göhr	East Germany	7.09	
2nd place, silver medalist(s)	3	Silke Gladisch	East Germany	7.12	AJR
3rd place, bronze medalist(s)	2	Marisa Masullo	Italy	7.19	NR
4	1	Bev Kinch	Great Britain	7.19	
5	6	Bärbel Schölzel	East Germany	7.24	
6	5	Marie-Christine Cazier	France	7.38	
