= 1976 European Athletics Indoor Championships – Women's 60 metres =

The women's 60 metres event at the 1976 European Athletics Indoor Championships was held on 22 February in Munich.

== Medalists ==
Gold	Silver	Bronze
Linda Haglund; Sweden	Sonia Lannaman; Great Britain	Elvira Possekel; West Germany

== Results ==
=== Heats ===
First 3 from each heat (Q) and the next 3 fastest (q) qualified for the semifinals.

Rank	Heat	Name	Nationality	Time	Notes
1	2	Linda Haglund	Sweden	7.29	Q
2	1	Elvira Possekel	West Germany	7.30	Q
3	3	Inge Helten	West Germany	7.32	Q
4	3	Sonia Lannaman	Great Britain	7.33	Q
5	2	Sylviane Telliez	France	7.36	Q
6	3	Vera Anisimova	Soviet Union	7.37	Q
7	1	Małgorzata Bogucka	Poland	7.41	Q
8	1	Mona-Lisa Pursiainen	Finland	7.43	Q
9	2	Helena Fliśnik	Poland	7.46	Q
10	1	Brigitte Haest	Austria	7.47	q
11	2	Gabi Hareter	Austria	7.49	q
12	3	Lyudmila Maslakova	Soviet Union	7.50	q
13	2	Annegret Kroniger	West Germany	7.51	
14	1	Lea Alaerts	Belgium	7.52	

=== Semifinals ===
First 3 from each heat (Q) qualified directly for the final.

Rank	Heat	Name	Nationality	Time	Notes
1	1	Linda Haglund	Sweden	7.20	Q
2	1	Inge Helten	West Germany	7.27	Q
3	1	Vera Anisimova	Soviet Union	7.29	Q
4	2	Elvira Possekel	West Germany	7.30	Q
5	2	Sylviane Telliez	France	7.35	Q
6	1	Mona-Lisa Pursiainen	Finland	7.36	
7	2	Sonia Lannaman	Great Britain	7.38	Q
8	1	Małgorzata Bogucka	Poland	7.39	
9	2	Helena Fliśnik	Poland	7.45	
10	2	Gabi Hareter	Austria	7.46	NR
11	2	Lyudmila Maslakova	Soviet Union	7.47	
12	1	Brigitte Haest	Austria	7.53	

=== Final ===
Rank	Name	Nationality	Time	Notes
1st place, gold medalist(s)	Linda Haglund	Sweden	7.24	
2nd place, silver medalist(s)	Sonia Lannaman	Great Britain	7.25	
3rd place, bronze medalist(s)	Elvira Possekel	West Germany	7.28	
4	Inge Helten	West Germany	7.29	
5	Sylviane Telliez	France	7.30	
6	Vera Anisimova	Soviet Union	7.32	
