= 1988 European Athletics Indoor Championships – Women's 60 metres =

The women's 60 metres event at the 1988 European Athletics Indoor Championships was held on 6 March.

== Medalists ==
Gold	Silver	Bronze
Nelli Cooman; Netherlands	Silke Möller; East Germany	Marlies Göhr; East Germany

== Results ==
=== Heats ===
First 2 from each heat (Q) and the next 2 fastest (q) qualified for the semifinals.

Rank	Heat	Name	Nationality	Time	Notes
1	3	Silke Möller	East Germany	7.11	Q
2	5	Nelli Cooman	Netherlands	7.17	Q
3	1	Marlies Göhr	East Germany	7.19	Q
3	2	Nadezhda Roshchupkina	Soviet Union	7.19	Q
5	1	Ulrike Sarvari	West Germany	7.20	Q
6	2	Laurence Bily	France	7.22	Q
7	5	Patricia Girard	France	7.28	Q
8	3	Els Vader	Netherlands	7.29	Q
9	5	Sandra Myers	Spain	7.32	q
10	1	Eva Murková	Czechoslovakia	7.38	
10	3	Muriel Leroy	France	7.38	q
12	1	Yolanda Díaz	Spain	7.40	
13	2	Edine van Heezik	Netherlands	7.41	
13	4	Bev Kinch	Great Britain	7.41	Q
15	4	Silke Knoll	West Germany	7.42	Q
16	2	Sisko Hanhijoki	Finland	7.44	
17	2	Andrea Thomas	West Germany	7.45	
18	1	Irma Könye	Hungary	7.46	
19	5	Virginia Gomes	Portugal	7.47	
20	4	Erzsébet Juhász	Hungary	7.48	
21	3	Lucrécia Jardim	Portugal	7.50	
22	4	Lene Demsitz	Denmark	7.55	
23	3	Marina Skourti	Greece	7.59	

=== Semifinals ===
First 3 from each semifinal qualified directly (Q) for the final.

Rank	Heat	Name	Nationality	Time	Notes
1	1	Silke Möller	East Germany	7.04	Q, NR
2	2	Nelli Cooman	Netherlands	7.10	Q
3	2	Marlies Göhr	East Germany	7.12	Q
4	1	Ulrike Sarvari	West Germany	7.16	Q
5	1	Nadezhda Roshchupkina	Soviet Union	7.18	Q
6	1	Els Vader	Netherlands	7.23	
6	2	Laurence Bily	France	7.23	Q
8	1	Bev Kinch	Great Britain	7.27	
9	2	Sandra Myers	Spain	7.32	
10	1	Patricia Girard	France	7.33	
11	2	Muriel Leroy	France	7.41	
12	2	Silke Knoll	West Germany	7.44	

=== Final ===
Rank	Lane	Name	Nationality	Time	Notes
1st place, gold medalist(s)	4	Nelli Cooman	Netherlands	7.04	
2nd place, silver medalist(s)	3	Silke Möller	East Germany	7.05	
3rd place, bronze medalist(s)	2	Marlies Göhr	East Germany	7.07	
4	5	Ulrike Sarvari	West Germany	7.18	
5	1	Nadezhda Roshchupkina	Soviet Union	7.21	
	6	Laurence Bily	France	DNS	
