= Laurence Bily =

French sprinter

Personal information
- Born: 5 May 1963 (age 63) Bressuire, France

Sport
- Sport: Track and field
Medal record
Representing France
European Championships
Bronze medal – third place	1982 Athens	4×100 m relay
European Indoor Championships
Silver medal – second place	1989 The Hague	60m
Silver medal – second place	1990 Glasgow	60m

Laurence Bily (born 5 May 1963) is a retired French sprinter, who specialized in the 100 metres. She ran for the Racing Club de France, and set a French junior record with 11.35 seconds in 1982 and a senior record with 11.04 in 1989.

== International competitions ==
Year	Competition	Venue	Position	Event	Notes
Representing France
1979	European Junior Championships	Bydgoszcz, Poland	7th	100 m	11.98
1979	European Junior Championships	Bydgoszcz, Poland	5th	4 × 100 m relay	45.31
1981	European Indoor Championships	Grenoble, France	14th (h)	50 m	6.42
1981	European Junior Championships	Utrecht, Netherlands	11th (sf)	100 m	11.57 (w)
1981	European Junior Championships	Utrecht, Netherlands	2nd	4 × 100 m relay	44.61
1982	European Indoor Championships	Milan, Italy	8th (sf)	60 m	7.37
1982	European Championships	Athens, Greece	6th	100 m	11.45
1982	European Championships	Athens, Greece	3rd	4 × 100 m relay	42.69
1983	European Indoor Championships	Budapest, Hungary	9th (h)	60 m	7.46
1983	Universiade	Edmonton, Canada	11th (sf)	100 m	11.68
1983	Universiade	Edmonton, Canada	–	4 × 100 m relay	DQ
1983	World Championships	Helsinki, Finland	27th (qf)	100 m	11.76
1985	Universiade	Kobe, Japan	4th	4 × 100 m relay	44.30
1986	European Indoor Championships	Madrid, Spain	5th	60 m	7.34
1986	European Championships	Stuttgart, West Germany	12th (sf)	100 m	11.49
1986	European Championships	Stuttgart, West Germany	4th	4 × 100 m relay	43.11
1987	European Indoor Championships	Liévin, France	7th (sf)	60 m	7.32
1987	World Championships	Rome, Italy	17th (qf)	100 m	11.49
1987	World Championships	Rome, Italy	8th	4 × 100 m relay	43.75
1988	European Indoor Championships	Budapest, Hungary	6th (sf)	60 m	7.23^{1}
1988	Olympic Games	Seoul, South Korea	20th (qf)	100 m	11.35
1988	Olympic Games	Seoul, South Korea	7th	4 × 100 m relay	44.02
1989	European Indoor Championships	The Hague, Netherlands	2nd	60 m	7.19
1989	World Indoor Championships	Budapest, Hungary	5th	60 m	7.19
1989	Jeux de la Francophonie	Casablanca, Morocco	1st	100 m	11.54
1989	Jeux de la Francophonie	Casablanca, Morocco	1st	4 × 100 m relay	43.38
1989	World Cup	Barcelona, Spain	4th	100 m	11.31^{2}
1989	World Cup	Barcelona, Spain	6th	200 m	23.20^{2}
1989	World Cup	Barcelona, Spain	—	4 × 100 m relay	DQ^{2}
1990	European Indoor Championships	Glasgow, United Kingdom	2nd	60 m	7.13
1990	European Championships	Split, Yugoslavia	2nd (h)	100 m	11.31^{3}
1991	World Championships	Tokyo, Japan	16th (qf)	100 m	11.45
1991	World Championships	Tokyo, Japan	5th	4 × 100 m relay	43.34
1992	European Indoor Championships	Genoa, Italy	4th	60 m	7.33
1992	Olympic Games	Barcelona, Spain	21st (qf)	100 m	11.64
1992	Olympic Games	Barcelona, Spain	4th	4 × 100 m relay	42.85

DNS = did not start. DNF = did not finish. DQ = disqualified.

^{1}Did not start in the final
^{2}Representing Europe
^{3}Did not finish in the semifinals
