= 1986 European Athletics Indoor Championships – Women's 60 metres =

The women's 60 metres event at the 1986 European Athletics Indoor Championships was held on 23 February.

== Medalists ==
Gold	Silver	Bronze
Nelli Fiere-Cooman; Netherlands	Marlies Göhr; East Germany	Silke Gladisch; East Germany

== Results ==
=== Heats ===
First 2 from each heat (Q) and the next 2 fastest (q) qualified for the final.

Rank	Heat	Name	Nationality	Time	Notes
1	1	Nelli Fiere-Cooman	Netherlands	7.07	Q
2	1	Marlies Göhr	East Germany	7.08	Q
3	2	Silke Gladisch	East Germany	7.12	Q
4	2	Bev Kinch	Great Britain	7.13	Q, NR
5	2	Laurence Bily	France	7.35	q
6	2	Heidi-Elke Gaugel	West Germany	7.41	q
7	1	Monika Hirsch	West Germany	7.43	
8	1	Yolanda Díaz	Spain	7.46	
9	2	Lourdes Valdor	Spain	7.48	
10	1	Maroula Teloni-Lambrou	Cyprus	7.54	
	1	Rossella Tarolo	Italy	DNS	

=== Final ===
Rank	Lane	Name	Nationality	Time	Notes
1st place, gold medalist(s)	4	Nelli Fiere-Cooman	Netherlands	7.00	WR
2nd place, silver medalist(s)	2	Marlies Göhr	East Germany	7.08	
3rd place, bronze medalist(s)	3	Silke Gladisch	East Germany	7.14	
4	5	Bev Kinch	Great Britain	7.16	
5	1	Laurence Bily	France	7.34	
6	6	Heidi-Elke Gaugel	West Germany	7.45	
