= Heather Oakes =

English sprinter (b. 1959)

Personal information
- Nationality: British
- Born: 14 August 1959 (age 67) London, England
- Height: 163 cm (5 ft 4 in)
- Weight: 64 kg (141 lb)

Sport
- Sport: Athletics
- Event: Sprints
- Club: Haringey AC
Medal record
Women's Athletics
Representing Great Britain
Olympic Games
Bronze medal – third place	1980 Moscow	4 × 100 m relay
Bronze medal – third place	1984 Los Angeles	4 × 100 m relay
World Indoor Games
Silver medal – second place	1985 Paris	60 m
Representing England
Commonwealth Games
Gold medal – first place	1986 Edinburgh	100 m
Gold medal – first place	1986 Edinburgh	4 × 100 m relay
Representing Europe
World Cup
Gold medal – first place	1979 Montreal	4 × 100 m relay

Heather Regina Oakes (née Hunte; born 14 August 1959) is an English former sprinter who competed mainly in the 100 metres. In the 4 × 100m relay, she won Olympic bronze medals in Moscow 1980 and Los Angeles 1984. She also won a silver medal in the 60m at the 1985 World Indoor Games and a gold medal in the 100m at the 1986 Commonwealth Games.

== Biography ==
Oakes was born in Hackney, London. She was a member of the Haringey Athletic Club. In 1977, as Heather Hunte, she finished fourth in the 100 m final at the European Junior Championships in Donetsk, being edged out of a medal by teammate Kathy Smallwood (11.71 - 11.72). She won a bronze medal in the sprint relay.

Hunte became the British 100 metres champion after winning the British WAAA Championships title at the 1979 WAAA Championships.

On 21 May 1980, at a meeting at the Crystal Palace, she ran the 100 metres in a wind-assisted 11.01 secs (+4.0). Later that year she competed for Great Britain at the Olympic Games in Moscow, where she won a bronze medal in the 4 × 100 metres relay, with her teammates Smallwood, Beverley Goddard and Sonia Lannaman. They ran a UK record of 42.43, which stood as the UK record until 2014. She also placed eighth in the 100 m final in 11.34 secs. In 1982, now competing as Heather Oakes, she finished seventh in the 100 metres final at the Commonwealth Games in 11.39. In 1983, at the World Championships in Helsinki, she reached the semi-finals of the 100 metres, running 11.50.

At the 1984 Olympic Games in Los Angeles, Oakes reunited with two of her Moscow teammates, Kathy Cook (Smallwood)) and Beverley Callender (Goddard) to win another bronze medal in the 4 × 100 m relay, they were joined by Simmone Jacobs. In the 100 m final, she finished seventh in 11.43. She had a fine indoor season in 1985, winning medals at both the World Indoor Games and the European Indoor Championships. At the World Indoors in January in Paris, she won a silver medal in 7.21 secs, just one-one hundredth of a second behind the winner Silke Gladisch. Then at the Europeans in March, she won the bronze medal behind Nelli Cooman and Marlies Gohr, but ahead of Gladisch. Oakes also regained the 100 metres title at the 1985 WAAA Championships.

Oakes became Commonwealth 100 m champion in Edinburgh, Scotland in 1986. She won in a lifetime best time of 11.20 secs. In an incredibly close race, she edged ahead of teammate Paula Dunn (11.21) and Canada's Angella Issajenko (also 11.21). Oakes later teamed up with Dunn, Kathy Cook and Joan Baptiste, to win the gold medal in the sprint relay. Oakes anchored the England quartet to victory in 43.39. Later in 1986, she reached the semi-finals of both the 100 and 200 metres at the European Championships in Stuttgart. In the 200 m, an event that she rarely contested. she ran a lifetime best of 22.92 secs.

During her career, Oakes won four WAAAs National titles and five UK National titles. As of 2022, her legal 100 m best (11.20) ranks her 18th on the UK all-time list, her 200 m best (22.92) ranks her 30th, while her 60 m best (7.21) ranks her 12th.

While Oakes competed at the highest level for her country, she also held down a full-time job. This is in contrast to today's athletes, who through lottery funding and sponsorship are able to train and compete without distraction. She is married to fellow Olympic bronze medallist Gary Oakes.

== Personal bests ==
- 60 m 7.21 Paris (Bercy) 19/01/1985
- 100 m 11.20 Beijing, CHN 20/09/1980 - ran 11.01 wind-assisted (+4.0) London 21/05/1980
- 200 m 22.92 Stuttgart, GER 28/08/1986
- 4 × 100 m relay 42.43 Moscow, RUS 1/08/80 UK Record

== National titles ==
- 2-time WAAAs (of England) National 100 m champion 1979, 1985 (2nd in 78, 83, 86, 3rd in 80, 82 )
- 2-time AAAs National Indoor 60 m champion 1978, 1985
- 5-times UK National champion 1979 (100), 1980 (100), 1982 (100), 1984 (100 & 200 m) (2nd at 200 in 1980)

== International competitions ==
Year	Competition	Venue	Position	Event	Notes
Representing| England
1982	Commonwealth Games	Brisbane, Australia	7th	100 m	11.39w
1986	Commonwealth Games	Edinburgh, Scotland	1st	100 m	11.20w
1986	Commonwealth Games	Edinburgh, Scotland	1st	4 × 100 m	43.39
Representing Great Britain
1977	European Junior Championships	Donetsk, Soviet Union	4th	100 m	11.72
1977	European Junior Championships	Donetsk, Soviet Union	3rd	4 × 100 m	44.71
1979	European Cup	Turin, Italy	4th	100 m	11.30
1979	European Cup	Turin, Italy	3rd	4 × 100 m	43.18
1979	World Cup	Montreal, Canada	1st	4 × 100 m	42.19
1980	Olympic Games	Moscow, Russia	8th	100 m	11.34
1980	Olympic Games	Moscow, Russia	3rd	4 × 100 m	42.43
1983	World Championships	Helsinki, Finland	semi-final	100 m	11.50
1984	Olympic Games	Los Angeles, United States	7th	100 m	11.43
1984	Olympic Games	Los Angeles, United States	3rd	4 × 100 m	43.11
1985	World Indoor Games	Paris, France	2nd	60 m	7.21
1985	European Indoor Championships	Piraeus, Greece	3rd	60 m	7.22
1985	European Cup	Moscow, Russia	6th	100 m	11.33
1985	European Cup	Moscow, Russia	4th	4 × 100 m	43.35
1986	European Championships	Stuttgart, Germany	semi-final	100 m	11.29
1986	European Championships	Stuttgart, Germany	semi-final	200 m	22.92

Note: Won the 1979 World Cup sprint relay representing Europe. Ran the anchor leg. The other team members were Linda Haglund (SWE),
Chantal Rega (FRA) and Annegret Richter (FRG).
