= Isabel Taylor =

Cuban sprinter

Personal information
- Full name: Isabel Taylor Rodríguez
- Nationality: Cuban
- Born: 21 December 1956 (age 69) Cárdenas, Cuba
- Height: 1.62 m (5 ft 4 in)
- Weight: 54 kg (119 lb)

Sport
- Sport: Sprinting
- Event: 100 metres
Medal record
Representing Cuba
Pan American Games
Bronze medal – third place	1979 San Juan	4x100m relay
Central American and Caribbean Games
Gold medal – first place	1978 Medellin	4x100m relay
Bronze medal – third place	1978 Medellin	100m

Isabel Taylor Rodríguez (born 21 December 1956) is a Cuban sprinter. She competed in the women's 100 metres at the 1976 Summer Olympics.

Her personal best in the 100 metres was 11.35 set in 1978.

== International competitions ==
Year	Competition	Venue	Position	Event	Notes
Representing Cuba
1976	Olympic Games	Montreal, Canada	30th (qf)	100 m	11.92
1976	Olympic Games	Montreal, Canada	10th (h)	4 × 100 m relay	44.29
1977	Central American and Caribbean Championships	Xalapa, Mexico	3rd	100 m	11.82
1977	Central American and Caribbean Championships	Xalapa, Mexico	1st	4 × 100 m relay	45.51
1977	Universiade	Sofia, Bulgaria	11th (sf)	100 m	11.67
1977	Universiade	Sofia, Bulgaria	4th	4 × 100 m relay	44.81
1978	Central American and Caribbean Games	Medellín, Colombia	3rd	100 m	11.74
1978	Central American and Caribbean Games	Medellín, Colombia	1st	4 × 100 m relay	44.37
1979	Pan American Games	San Juan, Puerto Rico	8th	100 m	11.94
1979	Pan American Games	San Juan, Puerto Rico	13th (sf)	200 m	24.39
1979	Pan American Games	San Juan, Puerto Rico	3rd	4 × 100 m relay	46.26
