= Gillian Hitchen =

English high jumper

Personal information
- Nationality: English
- Born: 1959 (age 66–67) Wigan, Greater Manchester,

Gillian Hitchen (born 1959), is a female former athlete who competed for England.

== Athletics career ==
Hitchen was a National Champion after winning the 1978 UK Athletics Championships title in the high jump.

She represented England in the high jump, at the 1978 Commonwealth Games in Edmonton, Alberta, Canada.
