= Martha Grossenbacher =

Dutch-Swiss sprinter

Personal information
- Born: 31 August 1959 (age 66) Paramaribo, Suriname
- Height: 1.76 m (5 ft 9 in)
- Weight: 70 kg (154 lb)

Sport
- Sport: Track and field
- Events: 100 m, 200 m, 400 m
- Club: TV Unterstrass

Martha Grossenbacher (née Derby; born 31 August 1959) is a retired athlete who specialised in sprinting events. She competed at the 1992 Summer Olympics as well one indoor and one outdoor World Championships.

Grossenbacher-Derby was born in Suriname and moved to the Netherlands at the age of 14. She only joined an athletics club in 1978, but by the next year she was already a member of the Dutch national team. At a meet in Portugal she met the Swiss javelin thrower Fred Grossenbacher, whom she married in March 1986. After the European championships of that year she moved to Wimmis in Switzerland and from that point on competed for Switzerland.

== Competition record ==
Year	Competition	Venue	Position	Event	Notes
Representing the Netherlands
1986	European Championships	Stuttgart, West Germany	19th (h)	100 m	11.65
1986	European Championships	Stuttgart, West Germany	14th (sf)	200 m	23.81
1986	European Championships	Stuttgart, West Germany	7th	4x100 m relay	44.38
Representing Switzerland
1987	European Indoor Championships	Liévin, France	12th (sf)	60 m	7.44
1987	World Indoor Championships	Indianapolis, United States	12th (sf)	60 m	7.54
1989	European Indoor Championships	The Hague, Netherlands	8th	60 m	7.42
1990	European Championships	Split, Yugoslavia	15th (sf)	400 m	53.57
1990	European Championships	Split, Yugoslavia	6th	4x400 m relay	3:29.94
1991	World Championships	Tokyo, Japan	24th (h)	400 m	53.77^{1}
1991	World Championships	Tokyo, Japan	9th (h)	4x400 m relay	3:30.32
1992	European Indoor Championships	Genoa, Italy	7th	60 m	7.40
1992	Olympic Games	Barcelona, Spain	9th (h)	4x400 m relay	3:31.26
1994	European Indoor Championships	Paris, France	19th (h)	60 m	7.53
1994	European Championships	Helsinki, Finland	6th	4x400 m relay	3:28.78

^{1}Did not start in the quarterfinals

== Personal bests ==
Outdoor

- 100 metres – 11.65 (-1.4 m/s, Stuttgart 1986)
- 200 metres – 23.67 (-1.7 m/s, Stuttgart 1986)
- 400 metres – 52.19 (St. Gallen 1989)

Indoor

- 50 metres – 6.32 (St. Gallen 1992)
- 60 metres – 7.34 (Magglingen 1989)
