= Rose-Aimée Bacoul =

French sprinter (born 1952)

Personal information
- Nationality: France
- Born: 9 January 1952 (age 74) Le François, Martinique

Sport
- Sport: Running
- Event: Sprints

Achievements and titles
- Personal best(s): 100 m: 11.16 (Casablanca; 1983); 200 m: 22.53 (1984)
Medal record
Women's athletics
Representing France
European Championships
Bronze medal – third place	1982 Athens	100 m
Bronze medal – third place	1982 Athens	4×100 m relay
Mediterranean Games
Gold medal – first place	1983 Casablanca	100 m
Gold medal – first place	1983 Casablanca	200 m
Gold medal – first place	1983 Casablanca	4x100 m relay]]
Summer Universiade
Bronze medal – third place	1975 Rome	4x100 m relay

Rose-Aimée Bacoul (born 9 January 1952 in Le François, Martinique) is a French athlete who specialises in the 100 and 200 meters. Bacoul competed in the women's 100 and 200 meters and also the 4 × 100 meter relay at the 1984 Summer Olympics.
