= Helena Pihl =

Swedish sprinter

Personal information
- Nationality: Swedish
- Born: 26 April 1955 (age 70) Mariestad, Sweden

Sport
- Sport: Sprinting
- Event: 4 × 100 metres relay

Helena Pihl (born 26 April 1955) is a Swedish sprinter. She competed in the women's 4 × 100 metres relay at the 1980 Summer Olympics.
