= Véronique Grandrieux =

French sprinter (born 1952)

Personal information
- Born: 16 September 1952 (age 73) Villeneuve-le-Roi, France
- Height: 1.69 m (5 ft 7 in)

Sport
- Country: France
- Event: Sprint

Véronique Grandrieux (married name is Alard)(born 16 September 1952) is a former French athlete who specialised in the sprints.

== Biography ==
She won the 400 meters at the 1979 French championships. She also set the record three times in the French 4 × 100 Metres Relay, in 1978 and 1980 and also advanced the record of France in the indoor 400m.

She participated in the 1980 Olympics, in Moscow taking fifth in the 4 × 100m relay alongside Chantal Réga, Raymonde Naigre and Emma Starving.

=== Prize list ===
- Athletics Indoor Championships France :
  - winner of 400 m 1979

=== Records ===
Personal records
Event	Performance	Location	Date
100 m	11 s 49		1978
