= Sharon Colyear =

British sprinter and hurdler (1955–2024)

Sharon Danville née Colyear
Personal information
- Nationality: British (English)
- Born: 22 April 1955 Manchester, England
- Died: 17 November 2024 (aged 69)

Sport
- Sport: Athletics
- Event(s): Sprints, hurdles
- Club: Stretford AC
Medal record
Women's athletics
Representing Great Britain
European Championships
Silver medal – second place	1978 Prague	4×100 m
Representing England
Commonwealth Games
Gold medal – first place	1978 Edmonton	4 x 100m relay
Bronze medal – third place	1978 Edmonton	100m hurdles

Sharon Danville (née Colyear, 22 April 1955 – 17 November 2024) was a British sprinter and hurdler. She represented Great Britain at the 1976 Montreal Olympics and at the 1984 Los Angeles Olympics. She won a bronze medal in the 100 metres hurdles at the 1978 Commonwealth Games, while in the 4 x 100 metres relay, she won a gold medal at the 1978 Commonwealth Games and a silver medal at the 1978 European Championships.

== Biography ==
Born in Manchester, Colyear won the 1969 AAAs Under 15 200m title in 25.5 secs and the 1970 AAAs U17 200m title in 25.0 secs.

Colyear became the British 200 metres hurdles champion after winning the British WAAA Championships title at the 1971 WAAA Championships.

On 22 June 1976, Colyear achieved her lifetime best in the 100m hurdles with 13.11 secs in Poland. At the 1976 WAAA Championships, she then won the AAAs 100m hurdles title, ahead of Judy Vernon, running a wind-assisted 13.47 secs, and also finished second behind Andrea Lynch in the 100m, running 11.39. At the 1976 Montreal Olympics, she ran 13.18 in her heat to qualify for the 100m hurdles semifinals, where she was eliminated in 17.32. She also finished second to Sonia Lannaman in the AAAs 100m final in 1977, running 11.35.

Colyear regained her AAAs 100m hurdles title at the 1978 WAAA Championships, running 13.51 to defeat Shirley Strong, who was second. At the 1978 Commonwealth Games in Edmonton, she won a bronze medal in an English sweep of the 100m hurdles final, with a wind-assisted 13.17, finishing behind Lorna Boothe (12.98) and Shirley Strong (13.08). She did win a gold medal in the relay, along with teammates Bev Goddard, Kathy Smallwood and Sonia Lannaman. A month later at the 1978 European Championships, she won a silver medal for Great Britain in the relay with the same three teammates. In the 100m hurdles, she ran 13.23 secs in her heat to qualify for the semis, where she ran 13.25, missing the final by one place.

After several quiet seasons and now competing as Sharon Danville, she ran 13.66 to finish third in the 100m hurdles at the 1983 UK Championships behind Shirley Strong and Pat Rollo. She earned selection for the Los Angeles Olympics in 1984, where she ran 13.46 in her 100m hurdles heat to qualify for the semifinals, where she improved to 13.35 for fifth in the second semi, missing the final by one place.

Colyear-Danville died on 17 November 2024 at the age of 69. The Sharon Colyear-Danville season opener track meet, held at Boston University annually in December, is named after her.

== International competitions ==
Year	Competition	Venue	Position	Event	Notes
Representing Great Britain / England
1976	Olympic Games	Montreal, Canada	semifinals	100 m hurdles	17.32
1976	Olympic Games	Montreal, Canada	8th	4 × 100 m relay	43.79
1978	Commonwealth Games	Edmonton, Canada	3rd	100 m hurdles	13.17 (w)
1978	Commonwealth Games	Edmonton, Canada	1st	4 × 100 m relay	43.70
1978	European Championships	Prague, Cxechoslovakia	semifinals	100 m hurdles	13.25
1978	European Championships	Prague, Cxechoslovakia	2nd	4 × 100 m relay	42.72
1984	Olympic Games	Los Angeles, United States	semifinals	100 m hurdles	13.35
