= Sonia Lannaman =

British sprinter

Personal information
- Nationality: British (English)
- Born: 24 March 1956 (age 70) Aston, Birmingham, England
- Height: 165 cm (5 ft 5 in)
- Weight: 57 kg (126 lb)

Sport
- Sport: Athletics
- Event: Sprints
- Club: Solihull Athletic Club; WBAC
Medal record
Women's athletics
Representing Great Britain
Olympic Games
Bronze medal – third place	1980 Moscow	4x100 m relay
European Championships
Silver medal – second place	1978 Prague	4 x 100 m relay
European Indoor Championships
Silver medal – second place	1976 Munich	60 m
Representing England
Commonwealth Games
Gold medal – first place	1978 Edmonton	100 metres
Gold medal – first place	1978 Edmonton	4 x 100 m relay
Gold medal – first place	1982 Brisbane	4 x 100 m relay
Silver medal – second place	1974 Christchurch	4 x 100 m relay
Silver medal – second place	1978 Edmonton	200 metres
Representing Europe
World Cup
Gold medal – first place	1977 Düsseldorf	4 × 100 m relay
Silver medal – second place	1977 Düsseldorf	100 metres

Sonia May Lannaman (born 24 March 1956) is a British former athlete, who competed mainly in the 100 metres. She won the Commonwealth Games 100 metres title in Edmonton 1978 and won an Olympic bronze medal in the 4 x 100 metres relay at the 1980 Moscow Games. In the 1977 Track and Field News world merit rankings, she was ranked number two in the world at both 100 metres (to Marlies Gohr) and 200 metres (to Irena Szewinska).

== Biography ==
Lannaman, born in Aston, Birmingham, finished second behind Della Pascoe in the 100 metres event at the 1972 WAAA Championships. The following month she competed in her first Olympics in 1972 (held in Munich), where she set a British junior record of 11.45 sec.

In 1973 she became European junior champion winning gold in the 100 metres, followed by a bronze in the 4 x 100 metres relay. She represented England at the 1974 Commonwealth Games in Christchurch, New Zealand, and won a silver medal in the 4 × 100 metres relay.

In 1976, Lannaman won a silver medal over 60 metres at the European Indoor Athletics Championships in Munich. In the summer of that year she made a major breakthrough into world-class sprinting. She ran the 100 metres in a hand-timed, wind assisted (+3.6) 10.8 sec. She also set a British record in the 200 metres. She was strongly tipped for medals in both sprints at the 1976 Montreal Olympics, but due to injury was unable to compete.

In 1977, Lannaman was ranked second only to world record holder Marlies Göhr in the 100 metres. In the European Cup of that year she was second in both the 100 and 200 m and in the inaugural World Cup, second again in the 100 m and first in the 4 × 100 m representing Europe. She also ran the fastest ever electronically timed 100 metres by a British woman with 10.93 sec in Dublin, which was wind assisted (+3.8), so did not stand for record purposes. Additionally she became both the British 100 metres champion and British 200 metres champion, after winning the British WAAA Championships titles at the 1977 WAAA Championships.

In 1978, Lannaman won the 100 m gold medal and 200 m silver medal in the 1978 Commonwealth Games for England and for Great Britain in the 1978 European Championships won a silver in the 4 × 100 m relay with teammates Kathy Smallwood-Cook, Beverley Goddard and Sharon Colyear.

In 1980, she ran her fastest official time in the 100 m of 11.20 sec in July, having set another British record in the 200 m of 22.58 sec in May. She competed again for Great Britain in the 1980 Summer Olympics held in Moscow, Russia in the 4 × 100 m relay, where she won the bronze medal with her teammates Heather Hunte, Kathy Smallwood-Cook and Beverley Goddard. She also reached the 200 m final, finishing eighth.

In 1982, Lannaman competed in her third Commonwealth Games, winning a gold in the 4 × 100 m relay.

She currently lives in the village of Chorley in Lichfield District, Staffordshire. She is married to Michael Garmston, former British athletics team physiotherapist. They have one son, Bradley Garmston, a professional footballer for Grimsby Town.

== Achievements ==
Year	Competition	Venue	Position	Event	Notes
Representing Great Britain / England
1972	Olympic Games	Munich, West Germany	quarterfinal	100 m	11.72 (11.45)
1973	European Junior Championships	Duisburg, West Germany	1st	100 m	11.73
1973	European Junior Championships	Duisburg, West Germany	3rd	4 × 100 m	45.38
1974	Commonwealth Games	Christchurch, New Zealand	semifinal	100 m	11.93
1974	Commonwealth Games	Christchurch, New Zealand	2nd	4 × 100 m	44.30
1974	European Championships	Rome, Italy	semifinal	100 m	11.53
1977	World Cup	Düsseldorf, West Germany	2nd	100 m	11.26
1977	World Cup	Düsseldorf, West Germany	1st	4 × 100 m	42.51
1978	Commonwealth Games	Edmonton, Canada	1st	100 m	11.27
1978	Commonwealth Games	Edmonton, Canada	2nd	200 m	22.89
1978	Commonwealth Games	Edmonton, Canada	1st	4 × 100 m	43.70
1978	European Championships	Prague, Czechoslovakia	8th	100 m	11.67
1978	European Championships	Prague, Czechoslovakia	semifinal	200 m	23.36
1978	European Championships	Prague, Czechoslovakia	2nd	4 × 100 m	42.72
1980	Olympic Games	Moscow, Soviet Union	semifinal	100 m	11.38
1980	Olympic Games	Moscow, Soviet Union	8th	200 m	22.80
1980	Olympic Games	Moscow, Soviet Union	3rd	4 × 100 m	42.43
1982	Commonwealth Games	Brisbane, Australia	9th	100 m	11.48
1982	Commonwealth Games	Brisbane, Australia	1st	4 × 100 m	43.15

Note: Results in brackets, indicate superior time achieved in earlier round.
