= Marlies Göhr =

East German sprinter

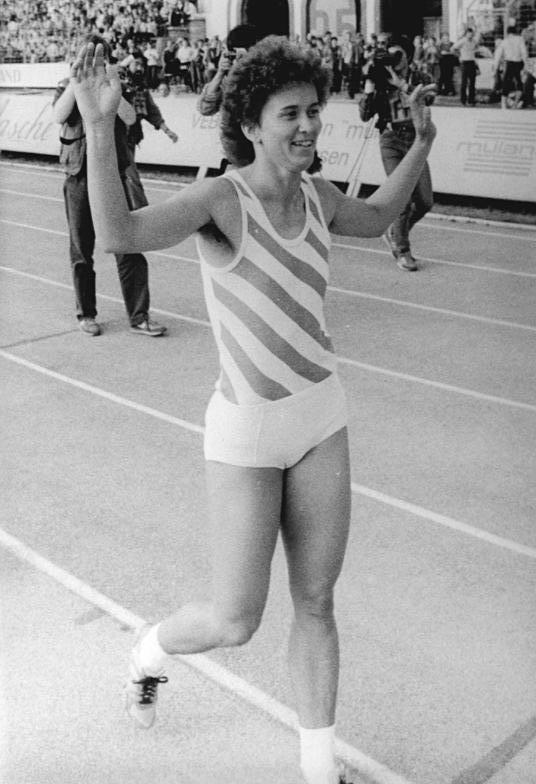
- Göhr in 1984

Personal information
- Nationality: German
- Born: 21 March 1958 (age 68) Gera, East Germany
- Height: 165 cm (5 ft 5 in)
- Weight: 55 kg (121 lb)

Sport
- Sport: Athletics

Achievements and titles
- Personal best: 100 m: 10.81 NR (1983)
Medal record
Women's athletics
Representing East Germany
Olympic Games
Gold medal – first place	1976 Montréal	4 × 100 m relay
Gold medal – first place	1980 Moscow	4 × 100 m relay
Silver medal – second place	1980 Moscow	100 m
Silver medal – second place	1988 Seoul	4 × 100 m relay
World Championships
Gold medal – first place	1983 Helsinki	100 m
Gold medal – first place	1983 Helsinki	4 × 100 m relay
Silver medal – second place	1987 Rome	4 × 100 m relay
European Championships
Gold medal – first place	1978 Prague	100 m
Gold medal – first place	1982 Athens	100 m
Gold medal – first place	1982 Athens	4 × 100 m relay
Gold medal – first place	1986 Stuttgart	100 m
Gold medal – first place	1986 Stuttgart	4 × 100 m relay
Silver medal – second place	1978 Prague	200 m
Bronze medal – third place	1978 Prague	4 × 100 m relay
European Indoor Championships
Gold medal – first place	1977 San Sebastián	60 m
Gold medal – first place	1978 Milan	60 m
Gold medal – first place	1979 Vienna	60 m
Friendship Games
Gold medal – first place	1984 Moscow	100 m

Marlies Göhr (née Oelsner; born 21 March 1958) is a former East German track and field athlete, the winner of the 100 metres at the inaugural World Championships in 1983. She ranked in the top 10 of the 100 m world rankings for twelve straight years, ranking first in six of those years. During this time she won many medals as a sprinter at major international championships and set several world records.

== Biography ==
=== The 1970s ===
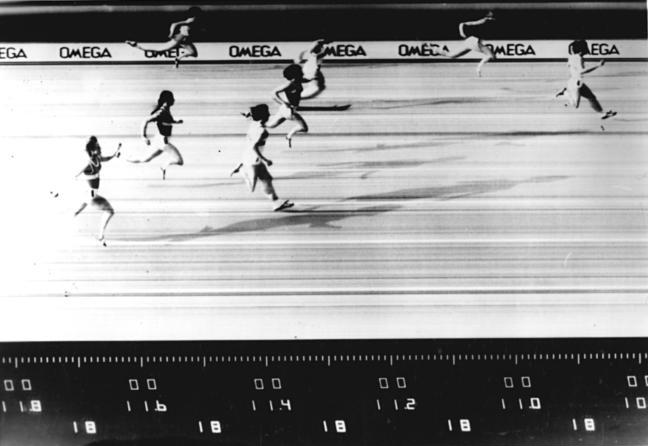
Finish photo of Oelsner's world record race, 1 July 1977.

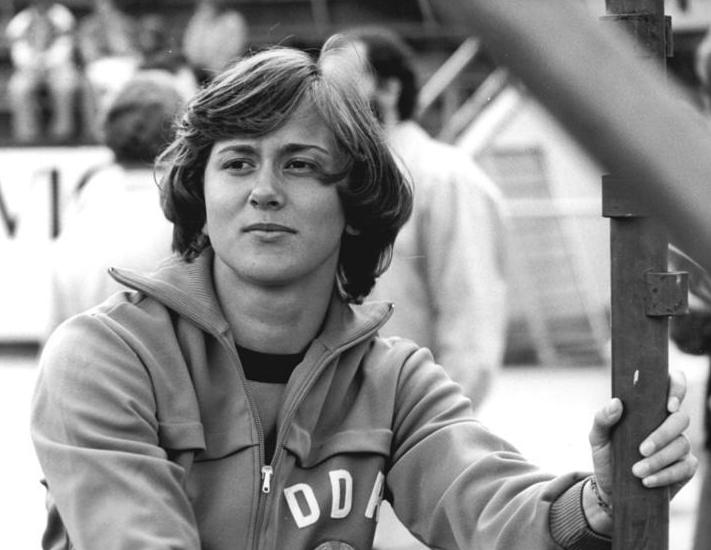
Marlies Göhr (1978)

Competing under her maiden name of Oelsner, Marlies finished second in the 100 m in her first major international at the 1975 European Athletics Junior Championships in Athens. The following year, at the 1976 Olympic Games in Montreal, she qualified for the 100 m final, finishing eighth, but went on to win her first Olympic gold medal on East Germany's victorious 4 × 100 m relay team.

Her breakthrough year was in 1977, winning the 100 m title at the East German championships at Dresden in a world record time of 10.88 s. This landmark performance was the first time a woman had run under 11 seconds with electronic timing. Later that year, she won the 100 m title at the inaugural World Cup in Düsseldorf, where she also won a silver medal in the relay.

She had a unique style of running, dubbed 'sewing machine' (or 'staccato') for the high frequency of relatively short-paced strides.

Marlies continued to dominate in 1978, competing under her married name of Göhr. She won the gold medal in the 100 m in that year's European Championships in Prague and was just beaten by one hundredth of a second in the 200 m by Lyudmila Kondratyeva (Soviet Union).

In 1979, at the World Cup in Montreal, she was beaten into second place in the 100 m by Evelyn Ashford (U.S.), thus starting a competitive rivalry.

=== The 1980s ===
In early 1980 Göhr confirmed herself as a favourite for the Olympic 100 m title. During a two-week span in May she ran 10.98 s at Potsdam, followed by an 11.00 s at Jena and at Dresden she ran a fast 10.93 sec, second only to her own world record time of 10.88 s. At the Moscow Olympic Games Göhr's main opposition was Lyudmila Kondratyeva (Soviet Union) who had beaten Göhr in the 200 m at the 1978 European Championships. Göhr got a bad start in the final and was edged out by Kondratyeva, who made a final lunge near the finish to win the gold medal, again by one hundredth of a second. Six days later, Göhr lined up for the 4 × 100 m relay final and anchored the team home to win the gold medal in a world record of 41.60 s.

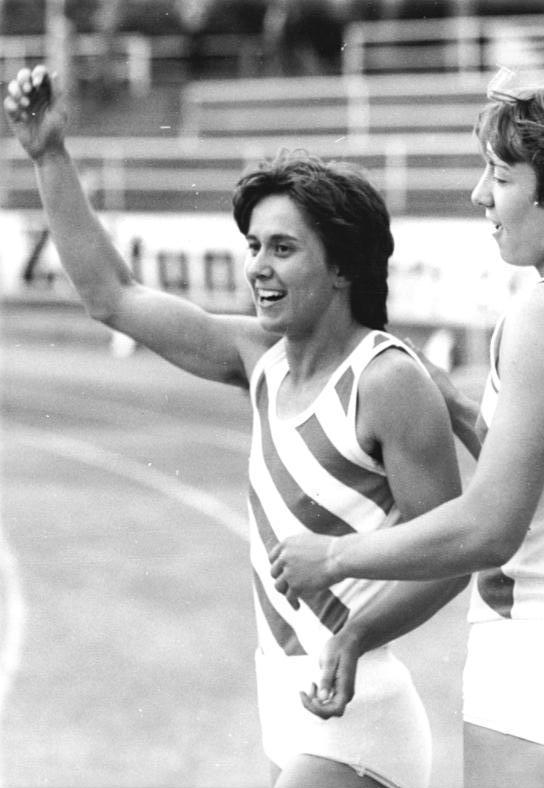
Marlies Göhr (1982)

Göhr made a good start to the 1981 season winning her third consecutive European Cup 100 m title at Zagreb in 11.17 s. Yet, on the world stage at the World Cup in Rome, Göhr had to settle for less than gold, again beaten by Evelyn Ashford, as well as by Kathy Smallwood (Great Britain). The following year at the 1982 European Championships in Athens, Göhr won in 11.01 s, becoming the first woman to defend the title.

The Göhr/Ashford rivalry blossomed in 1983, when both broke the world record. Firstly, Göhr broke it at the Olympic Day meet in East Berlin, winning in a time of 10.81 s. This record lasted less than a month, however, since Ashford broke it with a 10.79 s. Both athletes were in top form leading up to the inaugural World Championships, held in Helsinki. Both Göhr and Ashford won their respective semi-finals. Unfortunately, the final was anticlimactic since Ashford tore her hamstring during the race. Göhr won the gold medal from compatriot Marita Koch in 10.97 s and lifted a second gold medal in the 4 × 100 m relay.

Göhr and Ashford continued their dominance of the 100 m in 1984, recording the season's fastest 10 times between them. Unfortunately, Göhr was unable to compete at that year's Olympic Games in Los Angeles, because of the boycott by the Eastern Bloc countries, and Ashford won the gold medal. Ashford's time of 10.97 secs was the first time a woman had run a legal sub-11 second clocking in the Olympic Games. They had a showdown in Zurich, in which Ashford won setting a new world record of 10.76 to Gohr's 10.84.

In 1986, Göhr was focused on retaining her 100 m title at the European Championships in Stuttgart. She defended her title with a season's best time of 10.91 s and became the first woman to win three European 100 m titles. She then won a second gold medal in the 4 × 100 m relay. In October 1986, she was awarded a Star of People's Friendship in gold (second class) for her sporting success.

Göhr's last two appearances in major international championships were at the 1987 World Championships in Athletics in Rome and at the 1988 Olympic Games in Seoul. She was eliminated in the semi-finals of the 100 m in Rome but won a silver medal in the 4 × 100 m relay. At the Olympics, she was again eliminated in the 100 m semi-finals but won another silver in the relay.

== Drug testing ==
With the fall of the Berlin Wall in 1989, Stasi (secret police) files suggested widespread official doping under the East German regime.

Despite these reports, Göhr only tested positive for androgenic steroids in 1975 as a 17-year-old and has maintained that she never used them again.

== International competitions ==
Representing East Germany
Year	Competition	Venue	Position	Event	Result	Notes
1975	European Junior Championships	Athens, Greece	2nd	100 m	11.43	
1975	European Junior Championships	Athens, Greece	1st	4 × 100 m	44.05	
1976	Olympic Games	Montreal, Canada	8th	100 m		
1976	Olympic Games	Montreal, Canada	1st	4 × 100 m		
1977	European Indoor Championships	San Sebastián, Spain	1st	60 m		
1977	World Cup	Düsseldorf, West Germany	1st	100 m	11.16	
1977	World Cup	Düsseldorf, West Germany	2nd	4 × 100 m	42.65	
1978	European Indoor Championships	Milan, Italy	1st	60 m		
1978	European Championships	Prague, Czechoslovakia	1st	100 m		
1978	European Championships	Prague, Czechoslovakia	2nd	200 m		
1978	European Championships	Prague, Czechoslovakia	3rd	4 × 100 m		
1979	European Indoor Championships	Vienna, Austria	1st	60 m		
1979	Universiade	Mexico City, Mexico	1st	100 m		
1979	World Cup	Montreal, Canada	2nd	100 m	11.17	
1979	World Cup	Montreal, Canada	2nd	4 × 100 m	42.32	
1980	Olympic Games	Moscow, Soviet Union	2nd	100 m		
1980	Olympic Games	Moscow, Soviet Union	1st	4 × 100 m		
1981	World Cup	Rome, Italy	3rd	100 m	11.13	
1981	World Cup	Rome, Italy	1st	4 × 100 m	42.22	
1982	European Indoor Championships	Milan, Italy	1st	60 m		
1982	European Championships	Athens, Greece	1st	100 m		
1982	European Championships	Athens, Greece	1st	4 × 100 m		
1983	European Indoor Championships	Budapest, Hungary	1st	60 m		
1983	World Championships	Helsinki, Finland	1st	100 m		
1983	World Championships	Helsinki, Finland	1st	4 × 100 m		
1984	Friendship Games	Prague, Czechoslovakia	1st	100 m	10.95	
1985	European Indoor Championships	Piraeus, Greece	2nd	60 m		
1985	World Cup	Canberra, Australia	1st	100 m	11.10	
1985	World Cup	Canberra, Australia	1st	4 × 100 m	41.37	
1986	European Indoor Championship	Madrid, Spain	2nd	60 m		
1986	European Championships	Stuttgart, West Germany	1st	100 m		
1986	European Championships	Stuttgart, West Germany	1st	4 × 100 m		
1987	European Indoor Championships	Liévin, France	3rd	60 m		
1987	World Championships	Rome, Italy	14th	100 m	11.33	7th in semi-final 2
1987	World Championships	Rome, Italy	2nd	4 × 100 m		
1988	European Indoor Championships	Budapest, Hungary	3rd	60 m		
1988	Olympic Games	Seoul, South Korea	12th	100 m	11.13	6th in semi-final 1
1988	Olympic Games	Seoul, South Korea	2nd	4 × 100 m	42.09	

== World records ==
	Event	Time	Date
1	100 m	10.88	1 July 1977
2	4 × 100 m relay	41.85	13 July 1980
3	4 × 100 m relay	41.60	1 August 1980
4	100 m	10.88	9 July 1982
5	100 m	10.81	8 June 1983
6	4 × 100 m relay	41.53	31 July 1983
7	4 × 100 m relay	41.37	6 October 1985

== See also ==
- Women's 100 metres world record progression
- List of Olympic medalists in athletics (women)
- European Indoor Athletics champions
- German all-time top lists – 100 metres
- German all-time top lists – 200 metres

Records
Preceded by (West Germany) Annegret Richter	Women's 100 m World Record Holder; 1 July 1977 – 3 June 1980	Succeeded by (Soviet Union) Lyudmila Kondratyeva
Preceded by (Soviet Union) Lyudmila Kondratyeva	Women's 100 m World Record Holder; 8 June 1983 – 3 July 1983	Succeeded by (United States) Evelyn Ashford
