= Anelia Nuneva =

Bulgarian sprinter

Personal information
- Born: June 30, 1962 (age 64) Byala, Ruse Province, Bulgaria

Sport
- Sport: Track and field
Medal record
Representing Bulgaria
World Indoor Championships
Silver medal – second place	1987 Indianapolis	60 m
European Indoor Championships
Silver medal – second place	1984 Gothenburg	60 m
Silver medal – second place	1987 Liévin	60 m
Silver medal – second place	1992 Genova	60 m
European Championships
Silver medal – second place	1986 Stuttgart	100 m
Silver medal – second place	1986 Stuttgart	4×100 m relay
Bronze medal – third place	1994 Helsinki	4×100 m relay
Summer Universiade
Silver medal – second place	1985 Kobe	100 m
Bronze medal – third place	1985 Kobe	4x100 m relay

Aneliya Nuneva-Vechernikova, née Aneliya Nuneva, (Bulgarian: Анелия Нунева-Вечерниковa; born June 30, 1962) is a retired sprinter from Bulgaria who competed mainly in the 100 metres. In the final of the 100 m at the 1988 Summer Olympic Games she was drawn in lane four alongside the favorite, Florence Griffith-Joyner. She got out of the blocks well and challenged Griffith-Joyner up to about seventy metres when she abruptly pulled a muscle, resulting in her crossing the line in last place and injured. She reached the Olympic final again in 1992, finishing sixth. Her greatest successes were winning silver medals at the 1986 European Championships and 1987 World Indoor Championships. She was trained by Georgi Draganov.

== Personal bests ==
- 50 metres - 6.12 (1988)
- 60 metres - 7.03 (1987)
- 100 metres - 10.85 (1988)
- 200 metres - 22.01 (1987)

== International competitions ==
Representing Bulgaria
Year	Competition	Venue	Position	Event	Notes
1982	European Championships	Athens, Greece	4th	100 m	11.30 (wind: -0.5 m/s)
1982	European Championships	Athens, Greece	6th	200 m	22.93 (wind: +0.9 m/s)
1982	European Championships	Athens, Greece	4th	4 × 100 m	43.10
1983	World Championships	Helsinki, Finland	semi-final	100 m	11.31
1983	World Championships	Helsinki, Finland	6th	200m	22.68 (wind 1.5)
1984	European Indoor Championships	Gothenburg, Sweden	2nd	60 m	7.23
1984	Friendship Games	Prague, Czechoslovakia	3rd	100 m	11.10
1984	Friendship Games	Prague, Czechoslovakia	5th	200 m	22.84
1984	Friendship Games	Prague, Czechoslovakia	1st	4 × 100 m	42.62
1985	World Cup	Canberra, Australia	4th	100 m	11.50
1986	Goodwill Games	Moscow, Soviet Union	7th	100 m	11.40
1986	European Championships	Stuttgart, West Germany	2nd	100 m	11.04 (wind: +0.8 m/s)
1986	European Championships	Stuttgart, West Germany	2nd	4 × 100 m	42.68
1987	European Indoor Championships	Lievin, France	2nd	60 m	7.06
1987	World Indoor Championships	Indianapolis, United States	2nd	60 m	7.10
1987	World Championships	Rome, Italy	6th	100 m	11.09
1987	World Championships	Rome, Italy	4th	4 × 100 m	47.71
1988	Olympic Games	Seoul, South Korea	8th	100 m	11.49
1992	European Indoor Championships	Genoa, Italy	2nd	60 m	7.29
1992	Olympic Games	Barcelona, Spain	6th	100 m	11.10
1994	European Championships	Helsinki, Finland	4th	100 m	11.40 (wind: +0.6 m/s)
1994	European Championships	Helsinki, Finland	3rd	4 × 100 m	43.00
