= Ivanka Valkova =

Bulgarian sprinter

Personal information
- Nationality: Bulgarian
- Born: 28 October 1949 (age 76) Gradnitsa, Bulgaria
- Height: 1.70 m (5 ft 7 in)
- Weight: 63 kg (139 lb)

Sport
- Sport: Sprinting
- Event: 100 metres
Medal record
Representing Bulgaria
Summer Universiade
| Silver medal – second place | 1977 Sofia | 4x100m relay |

Ivanka Micheva Valkova (Bulgarian: Иванка Мичева Вълкова; born 28 October 1949) is a Bulgarian sprinter. She competed in the women's 100 metres at the 1972 Summer Olympics.
