= Lena Möller =

Swedish sprinter

Personal information
- Nationality: Swedish
- Born: 17 April 1957 (age 69) Norrköping, Sweden

Sport
- Sport: Sprinting
- Event: 4 × 100 metres relay

Lena Elisabet Möller (born 17 April 1957) is a Swedish sprinter. She competed in the women's 4 × 100 metres relay at the 1980 Summer Olympics.
