= Lyudmila Kondratyeva =

Russian former track and field athlete (born 1958)

Personal information
- Full name: Lyudmila Andreyevna Kondratyeva
- Born: 11 April 1958 (age 68) Shakhty, Russian SFSR, Soviet Union
- Height: 168 cm (5 ft 6 in)
- Weight: 57 kg (126 lb)
Medal record
Women's athletics
Representing Soviet Union
Olympic Games
Gold medal – first place	1980 Moscow	100 m
Bronze medal – third place	1988 Seoul	4×100 m
European Championships
Gold medal – first place	1978 Prague	200 m
Gold medal – first place	1978 Prague	4×100 m
European Indoor Championships
Bronze medal – third place	1980 Sindelfingen	60 m
Friendship Games
Silver medal – second place	1984 Moscow	100 m
Silver medal – second place	1984 Moscow	4 × 100 m relay

Lyudmila Andreyevna Kondratyeva (Russian: Людмила Андреевна Кондратьева; born 11 April 1958) is a Russian former track and field athlete, who competed for the Soviet Union and is the 1980 Olympic 100 m champion.

Kondratyeva began athletics at age 11 at the Children and Youth Sport School in Shakhty, her first trainer being Lyudmila Mikhailovna Pavlenko. Two years later she passed exams into Rostov on Don Children and Youth Sport School, created in 1971, where she was coached by Nina Vasilyevna Lazarchenko. In 1973 she became a member of the Soviet Union National Youth Team, and in 1974 - of the Soviet Union National Team. At the 1975 European Youth Championships Kondratyeva finished 4th in the 200 m and in the 4 × 100 m relay. Four years later she became the winner of the 200 m at the 1978 European Championships, where she also won a gold in the 4 × 100 m relay event.

Now one of the medal favourites for the 1980 Summer Olympics, which were held in Moscow, she also ran a non-recognised World Record just before the Olympics. The final in Moscow was a close race, with the first 5 athletes finishing within 1 tenth of a second. A photo finish showed that Kondratyeva had beaten Marlies Göhr of East Germany by just 0.01 seconds. Kondratyeva pulled her hamstring at the finish, thereby not allowing her to run the 200 m or the 4 × 100 m relay.

Unable to compete at the 1984 Summer Olympics due to the boycott led by the Soviet Union, Kondratyeva could not defend her Olympic title. She retired after that season and married Yuriy Sedykh, two-time Olympic champion in the hammer throw, although they would later divorce. The pair had a daughter, Oksana Kondratyeva, who followed in her father's footsteps and became an international hammer thrower.

She came out of retirement to compete at the 1988 Seoul Olympic Games. She made the semi-finals of the 100 m and won a bronze medal as part of the Soviet women's 4 × 100 m relay.

== Bibliography ==
- R. V. Orlov (1983). Lyudmila Kondratyeva. Heroes of the Olympic Games (in Russian). Moscow: Fizkultura i sport. Archived from the original on 25 October 2007.

Records
Preceded by (East Germany) Marlies Göhr	Women's 100 m World Record Holder; 3 June 1980 – 8 June 1983	Succeeded by (East Germany) Marlies Göhr
