= Beverley Goddard =

English track and field athlete (born 1956)

Beverley Callender née Goddard
Personal information
- Nationality: British/Barbadian
- Born: 28 August 1956 (age 69) Barbados

Sport
- Sport: Athletics
- Event: Sprints
- Club: Reading Athletic Club
Medal record
Representing Great Britain
Women's Athletics
Olympic Games
Bronze medal – third place	1980 Moscow	4 x 100 m
Bronze medal – third place	1984 Los Angeles	4 x 100 m
World Championships
Silver medal – second place	1983 Helsinki	4 x 100 m
European Championships
Silver medal – second place	1978 Prague	4 x 100 m
Silver medal – second place	1982 Athens	4 x 100 m
Universiade
Gold medal – first place	1981 Bucharest	100 m
Silver medal – second place	1979 Mexico City	4 x 100 m
Silver medal – second place	1981 Bucharest	4 x 100 m
Bronze medal – third place	1979 Mexico City	100 m
Bronze medal – third place	1979 Mexico City	200 m
Representing England
Commonwealth Games
Gold medal – first place	1978 Edmonton	4 x 100 m
Gold medal – first place	1982 Brisbane	4 x 100 m

Beverley Lanita Callender (née Goddard, born 28 August 1956) is a British/Barbadian former track and field sprinter. She competed for Great Britain at the Olympic Games in Montreal 1976, Moscow 1980 and Los Angeles 1984, winning bronze medals in the 4 x 100 metres relay in 1980 and 1984. She is also the 1981 World Student Games 100 metres champion.

== Biography ==
Goddard was born in Barbados and raised in England. She was a member of the Reading Athletic Club. In 1976, she competed at the Montreal Olympics, reaching the quarter finals of the 200 metres. She was coached by Jim Spooner.

In 1978, she finished fourth in the 200 metres final at the Commonwealth Games in Edmonton, before winning gold in the 4 × 100 m relay along with Kathy Smallwood, Sharon Colyear and Sonia Lannaman. At the European Championships in Prague, the same quartet won a silver medal behind the Soviet Union and ahead of East Germany. In 1979, she won three medals at the World Student Games (Universiade), with bronze in the 100 and 200 metres and silver in the sprint relay. In the 100 metres, she ran her lifetime best of 11.22 seconds in the semifinal.

At the 1980 Moscow Olympic Games, she was one of three British woman who reached the 200 m final, finishing sixth in a lifetime best of 22.72 seconds. Kathy Smallwood was fifth and Sonia Lannaman eighth. The three then teamed up with 100 metres finalist Heather Hunte, to win the bronze medal in the 4 × 100 m relay. The quartet ran a UK record of 42.43 secs, which stood until 2014. Her biggest individual success came in 1981, when she won the World Student Games title at 100 metres, defeating the Soviet sprinters Olga Zolotaryeva and Olga Nasonova. She also won a silver medal in the relay.

In 1982, now competing as Beverley Callender, she reached the 200 metres finals at both the European Championships in Athens and the Commonwealth Games in Brisbane, finishing fifth (22.91 secs) and sixth (22.92 secs) respectively. In Prague, she teamed up with Wendy Hoyte, Smallwood and Shirley Thomas to win relay silver, while in Brisbane, she won relay gold with Hoyte, Smallwood and Sonia Lannaman. A year later, she won a relay silver medal at the inaugural World Championships in Helsinki, along with Joan Baptiste, Kathy Cook (Smallwood) and Shirley Thomas. She also competed in the 100 metres. At her third Olympic Games in Los Angeles 1984, she won her second Olympic bronze medal, reuniting with two of her three teammates from Moscow, Heather Oakes (Hunte) and Kathy Cook. The fourth squad member was Simmone Jacobs.

From 1978 to 1984, the British or English women's sprint relay squads won a medal at every Olympic, World, European and Commonwealth competition, both Callender and Kathy Cook were a member of every team. She usually ran the third leg and became a specialist in this position. 1984 would be the last time for 29 years, that the British Women's 4 × 100 m squad won a medal at Olympic or World level. This ended in 2013 when they won bronze at the World Championships.

In domestic competition, at the AAA Championships and UK Championships, she had eight second-place finishes. At the AAAs she was second three times in the 200 metres (1979, 1982 and 1984) and second in the 1980 100 metres. At the UKs, she was second three times at 100 metres (1978, 1979 and 1982) and second in the 1978 200 metres. She did win the 1982 UK title at 200 metres. She was also twice third in the AAAs 200 metres (1979, 1983) and twice third at the UK 100 metres (1979, 1983), for a total of 13 top three placements.

As of 2022, Callender's 200 metres best, ranks her 14th on the UK all-time list. In the 100 metres she ranks 21st. Now a retired teacher.

== Personal bests ==
- 100 metres – 11.22 (1979)
- 200 metres – 22.72 (1980)
- 4×100 metres – 42.43 (1980) former NR

== National titles ==
- UK Athletics Championships
  - 200 metres: 1982

== International competitions ==
Representing Great Britain & England
Year	Competition	Venue	Position	Event	Result	Notes
1976	Olympic Games	Montreal, Canada	quarterfinal	200 m	23.74	
1978	European Championships	Prague, Czechoslovakia	semifinal	200 m	23.37	
1978	European Championships	Prague, Czechoslovakia	2nd	4 × 100 m	42.72	
1978	Commonwealth Games	Edmonton, Canada	5th	100 m	11.40	
1978	Commonwealth Games	Edmonton, Canada	4th	200 m	22.95	
1978	Commonwealth Games	Edmonton, Canada	1st	4 × 100 m	43.70	
1979	World Student Games	Mexico City, Mexico	3rd	100 m	11.32	
1979	World Student Games	Mexico City, Mexico	3rd	200 m	22.76	
1979	World Student Games	Mexico City, Mexico	2nd	4 × 100 m	43.26	
1980	Olympic Games	Moscow, Russia	6th	200 m	22.72	
1980	Olympic Games	Moscow, Russia	3rd	4 × 100 m	42.43	
1981	World Student Games	Bucharest, Romania	1st	100 m	11.35	
1981	World Student Games	Bucharest, Romania	2nd	4 × 100 m	43.86	
1981	World Cup	Rome, Italy	—	4 × 100 m	DNF	
1982	European Championships	Athens, Greece	5th	200 m	22.91	
1982	European Championships	Athens, Greece	2nd	4 × 100 m	42.66	
1982	Commonwealth Games	Brisbane, Australia	6th	200 m	22.92	
1982	Commonwealth Games	Brisbane, Australia	1st	4 × 100 m	43.15	
1983	World Championships	Helsinki, Finland	quarter-final	100 m	11.48	
1983	World Championships	Helsinki, Finland	2nd	4 × 100 m	42.71	
1984	Olympic Games	Los Angeles, United States	3rd	4 × 100 m	43.11	
