= Linda Haglund =

Swedish sprinter

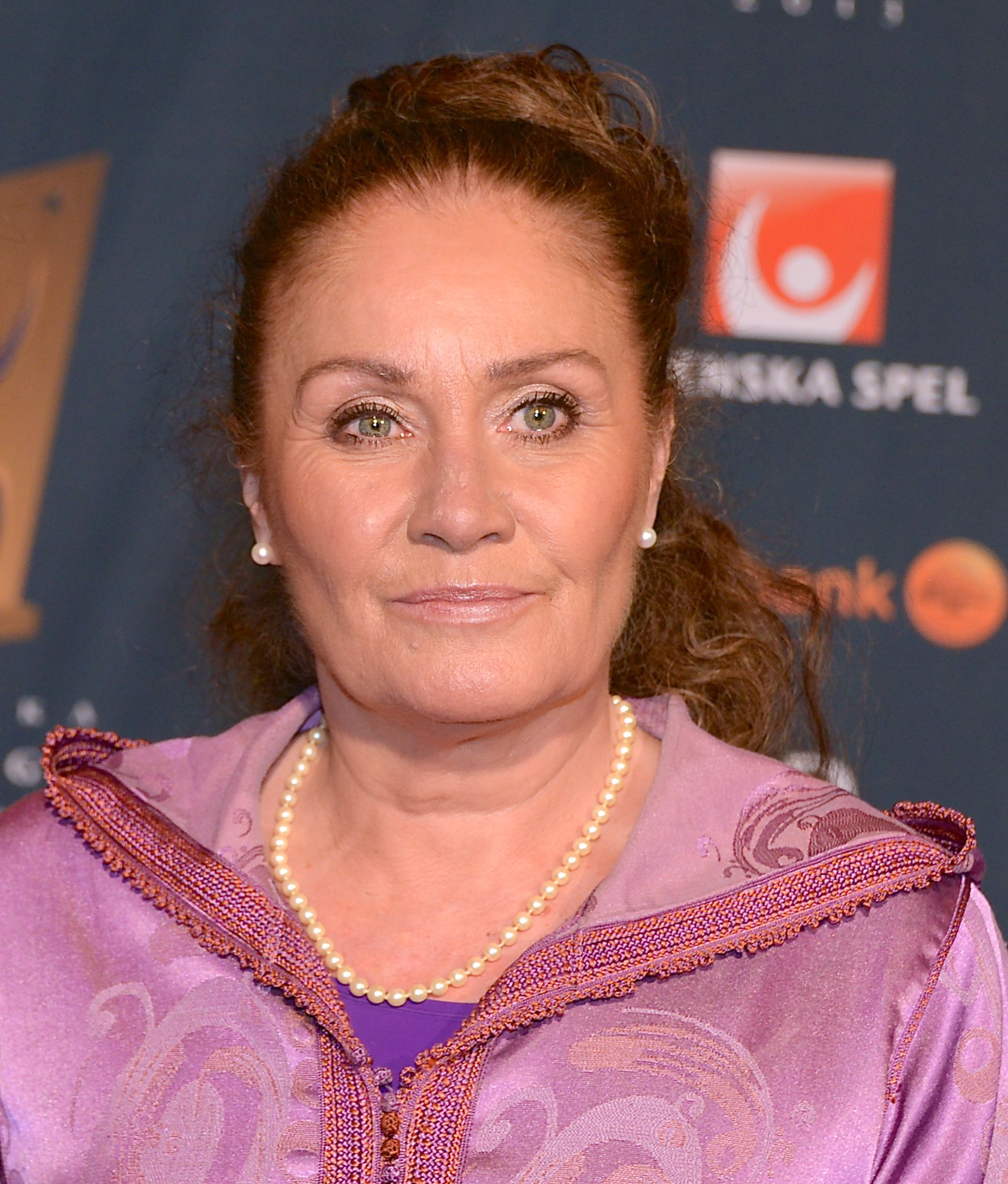
- Linda Haglund at Globen in Stockholm, 2013.

Personal information
- Born: 15 June 1956 Enskede, Sweden
- Died: 21 November 2015 (aged 59) Stockholm, Sweden
- Occupations: Author, athlete
- Spouses: Houston McTear (1957–2015; his death); 3 children
Medal record
Women's athletics
Representing Sweden
European Championships
Silver medal – second place	1978 Prague	100 m
European Indoor Championships
Gold medal – first place	1976 Munich	60 m
Silver medal – second place	1978 Milan	60 m
Silver medal – second place	1980 Sindelfingen	60 m
Silver medal – second place	1981 Grenoble	50 m

Linda Haglund (15 June 1956 – 21 November 2015) was a Swedish Olympic sprinter.

== Running career ==
Haglund became a member of Hanvikens SK, a track and field club located just south of Stockholm, at the age of 13. She showed great promise as a future sprinting star by recording, barefoot, 12.7 for 100 m at her first meet representing Hanvikens SK. Haglund's precocious talent was displayed on an international stage at the European Championships of 1971, held in Helsinki, Finland.

She was named on the Swedish track and field team that competed in Helsinki that year. She was 15 at the time and acknowledged as the youngest athlete of the meet. One year later, Haglund was appointed to the first of three Swedish Olympic teams: Munich, 1972. Her running career would take her to the 1976 Montreal Olympic Games, as well as those held in Moscow in 1980. Haglund had her best Olympic Games' showing with a fourth place in the Moscow Games' 100 m final.

Haglund participated in the World Cups of 1979 (Montreal) and 1981 (Rome) and was a five-time medalist at European Championships held in 1976 (gold), 1978 (silver), 1978 (silver), 1980 (silver), and 1981 (silver). Haglund was the captain for many years of the women's track and field team in Sweden and still holds Swedish records for 100 m - 11.16 (1980), 200 m - 22.82 (1978), and 60 m - 7.13 (1978). Haglund was one of very few sprinters to have beaten Evelyn Ashford. Haglund ran 11.06 (wind-aided) to better Jarmila Kratochvílová's 11.18 and Ashford's 11.25 in a 1981 meet in Berlin. Haglund was ranked 3rd (78), 5th (81), and 7th (79 & 80) in world rankings during her running career.

=== Career end ===
Haglund's running career was brought to an abrupt end in 1981 after a failed drug test. A Swedish board of adjudicators found Haglund innocent of charges (she alleged her coach had given her two pills he called 'vitamins') but turned over their decision for further consideration to an international track and field tribunal assembled in Kingston, Jamaica, in 1982. This tribunal found against Haglund, who then retired.

=== Legacy ===
Haglund was a member of the Swedish Sports Academy (consisting of 100 athletes in 100 years of Swedish sport from 1899 to 1999), and was awarded the Victoria Scholarship in 1981. She also belonged to the Legends of "1956", a sports fraternity of outstanding Swedish athletes born in 1956: Björn Borg, Ingemar Stenmark, Thomas Wassberg and Frank Andersson.

== After running ==
Inspired by the Russian artist Marc Chagall, Haglund was a painter and designer and had several exhibitions. She also authored a book on health and wellness, Lindas må bra bok (Linda's feel good book), published by Prisma in 2007. Haglund was related to the Danish singer and actor Otto Brandenburg.

Haglund was married to American sprinter Houston McTear from the 1980s until his death on 1 November 2015, aged 58.

== Death ==
Haglund died of cancer and a pulmonary hemorrhage on 21 November 2015, aged 59. Her cancer and lung issues were discovered first only six days before her death after she was transported by ambulance to hospital after feeling ill. She died only three weeks after her husband's death, also from cancer.

== See also ==
- List of sportspeople sanctioned for doping offences
