= Laura Miano =

Italian sprinter

Personal information
- Nationality: Italian
- Born: March 8, 1959 (age 67) Genoa, Italy
- Height: 1.60 m (5 ft 3 in)
- Weight: 49 kg (108 lb)

Sport
- Country: Italy
- Sport: Athletics
- Event: Sprint
- Club: Snam Gas metano

Achievements and titles
- Personal bests: 60m indoor: 7"40 (1984); 100 m: 11.43 (1978); 200 m: 23.29 (1979)
Medal record
Mediterranean Games
Silver medal – second place	1979 Split	4×100 metres relay
Bronze medal – third place	1979 Split	100 metres

Laura Miano (born 8 March 1959, in Genoa) is a former Italian sprinter, that won one medal at the International athletics competitions and one with the national relay team .

== Biography ==
Laura Miano has 21 caps in national team from 1977 to 1984.

== National titles ==
Laura Miano has won 4 times the individual national championship.

- 2 wins in the 100 metres (1978, 1979)
- 2 wins in the 60 metres indoor (1980, 1984)

== See also ==
- Italy national relay team
