= Annie Alizé =

French sprinter

Personal information
- Born: Annie Pellicia; 14 June 1955 (age 70) Mananjary, Madagascar
- Height: 159 cm (5 ft 3 in)
- Weight: 47 kg (104 lb)

Sport
- Country: France
- Sport: Athletics
- Event(s): 100 m, 200 m

Annie Alizé (née Pellicia, born 14 June 1955 in Mananjary, Madagascar) is a former French sprinter.

== Biography ==
During the French Athletics Championships in 1977, she won both the 100 metres and 200 metres races. She also won two national titles indoors: 50 metres in 1978 and 60 metres in 1979.

In 1979, she won the silver medal in the 200m at the 1979 Mediterranean Games in Split. She ran for the Club C.A.M.N Villeurbanne.

=== Prize list ===
- France Championships in Athletics:
  - winner of 100m in 1977.
  - winner of 200m in 1977.
- Athletics Indoor Championships France:
  - winner of 50m in 1978.
  - winner of 60m in 1979.

=== Records ===
Personal records
Race	Performance	Place	Date	Source
50m	6 s 26	Grenoble (FRA)	2 February 1980	
60m	7 s 38	Ferry-Dusika-Halle, Wien (AUT)	25 February 1979	
100m	11 s 61	Stadion Evžena Rošického, Praha (TCH)	29 August 1978	
200m	23 s 37		1979	
4x100m	43 s 78	Stadion Evžena Rošického, Praha (TCH)	1 September 1978	
