= Sofka Popova =

Bulgarian sprinter

Personal information
- Born: 15 August 1953 (age 72) Plovdiv, Bulgaria

Sport
- Sport: Track and field
Medal record
Representing Bulgaria
European Indoor Championships
Gold medal – first place	1980 Sindelfingen	60 m
Gold medal – first place	1981 Grenoble	50 m
Bronze medal – third place	1971 Sofia	4×200 m
Summer Universiade
Silver medal – second place	1977 Sofia	4x100 m

Sofka Vasileva Popova (Bulgarian: Софка Попова) (née Kazandzhieva/Bulgarian: Казанджиева; born 15 August 1953) is a retired 100 metres runner from Bulgaria. She won three medals at the European Indoor Championships. She won 5 national indoor 60 m titles, from 1978 to 82.

== Achievements ==
Year	Tournament	Venue	Result	Extra
1980	European Indoor Championships	Sindelfingen, West Germany	1st	60 metres
1981	European Indoor Championships	Grenoble, France	1st	50 metres
1982	European Indoor Championships	Milan, Italy	2nd	60 metres
