= Vera Anisimova =

Soviet sprinter

Personal information
- Born: 25 May 1952 (age 74) Moscow, Soviet Union

Sport
- Sport: Track and field
Medal record
Representing Soviet Union
Olympic Games
Silver medal – second place	1980 Moscow	4×100 m
Bronze medal – third place	1976 Montreal	4×100 m
European Championships
Gold medal – first place	1978 Prague	4×100 m
Summer Universiade
Gold medal – first place	1977 Sofia	4x100 m
Gold medal – first place	1979 Mexico City	4x100 m

Vera Vasilyevna Anisimova (Russian: Вера Васильевна Анисимова; born 25 May 1952 in Moscow) is a Soviet athlete who competed mainly in the 100 metres.

Anisimova trained at the Armed Forces sports society in Moscow. She competed for the USSR in the 1976 Summer Olympics held in Montreal, Quebec, Canada in the 4 × 100 metres where she won the bronze medal with her teammates Tatyana Prorochenko, Lyudmila Maslakova and Nadezhda Besfamilnaya.

She returned for the Soviet Union in the 1980 Summer Olympics held in Moscow, in the 4 × 100 metres where she again teamed up with Lyudmila Zharkova-Maslakova and won the silver medal with their teammates Vera Komisova, and Natalya Bochina.
