= Chantal Réga =

French athlete

- Réga in 1978

Personal information
- Born: August 7, 1955 (age 70) Nîmes, France
Medal record
Women's athletics
Representing France
European Championships
Bronze medal – third place	1982 Athens	400 metres hurdles
Mediterranean Games
Gold medal – first place	1979 Split	100 metres
Summer Universiade
Bronze medal – third place	1979 Mexico City	4 x 100 metres relay
Representing Europe
World Cup
Gold medal – first place	1979 Montreal	4 × 100 metres relay

Chantal Réga (born August 7, 1955, in Nîmes) is a retired track and field sprinter and hurdler from France, best known for winning the bronze medal in the women's 400 m hurdles at the 1982 European Championships. A two-time Olympian (1976 and 1980) she won a total number of fifteen national titles during the 1970s and early 1980s.

== International ==
International Results
Date	Competition	Location	Result	Event
1976	Olympic Games	Montréal	8th	200m
1977	European Indoor Championships	Saint-Sébastien	4th	60m
1978	European Indoor Championships	Milan	6th	60m
1978	European Championships	Prague	7th	100m
1978	European Championships	Prague	5th	200m
1979	Mediterranean Games	Split	1st	100m
1979	Mediterranean Games	Split	1st	4 × 100m
1979	World Cup of Nations	Montréal	1st	4 × 100m
1980	Olympic Games	Moscow	7th	100m
1980	Olympic Games	Moscow	5th	4 × 100m
1982	European Championships	Athens	3rd	400m hurdles

== National Championships ==
- Champion of France at 100m in 1976, 1978, 1979 and 1980
- Champion of France at 200m in 1975, 1976, 1978, 1979 and 1980
- Champion of France at 100m hurdles in 1974 and 1975
- Champion of France at 400m hurdles in 1982
- Champion of France at 60m Indoors in 1977
- Champion of France at 200m Indoors in 1982
- Champion of France at 60m hurdles Indoors in 1975
