= Helinä Marjamaa =

Finnish sprinter

Personal information
- Nationality: Finnish
- Born: 5 June 1956 (age 70) Evijärvi, Finland

Sport
- Sport: Sprinting
- Event: 100 metres

Helinä Marjamaa (born 5 June 1956) is a Finnish sprinter. She competed in the 100 metres at the 1980 Summer Olympics and the 1984 Summer Olympics.

Helina won 6 National 100m championships, between 1978 and 1984. She also won 4 200m Finnish titles.

In 1981 she won the European Cup, semi final 100m meeting, tying with Els Vader of the Netherlands, both timing 11.29.

In 1983 Helina made it to the final of the 100m World Championships final, in Helsinki, she finished 6th place. And narrowly missed a place in the 200m final, finishing 5th in the semi final.

At the Los Angeles Olympics, again she made the semi finals of the 100m and 200m narrowly missing a place in the final.

== International competitions ==
Representing Finland
Year	Competition	Venue	Position	Event	Result	Wind (m/s)	Notes
1983	World Championships	Helsinki, Finland	5th (sf)	200 m	22.86	+2.1	
