= List of Hungarian Athletics Championships champions (women) =

The Hungarian Athletics Championships (Hungarian: Atlétikai Magyar Bajnokság) is an annual outdoor track and field competition, organised by the Hungarian Athletics Association, which serves as the national championship for the sport in Hungary. Winners of events at the competition are declared the Hungarian national champions for that year. The competition was first held in 1896 as a men's only competition and women's events were added in 1932.

== 100 metres ==
- 1960: Erzsébet Bartos
- 1961: Margit Nemesházi
- 1962: Erzsébet Bartos
- 1963: Margit Nemesházi
- 1964: Margit Nemesházi
- 1965: Margit Nemesházi
- 1966: Annamária Tóth
- 1967: Margit Nemesházi
- 1968: Györgyi Balogh
- 1969: Judit Szabó
- 1970: Judit Szabó
- 1971: Györgyi Balogh
- 1972: Györgyi Balogh
- 1973: Judit Szabó
- 1974: Ildikó Szabó
- 1975: Ildikó Szabó
- 1976: Irma Könye
- 1977: Ildikó Erdélyi
- 1978: Irén Orosz-Árva
- 1979: Irén Orosz-Árva
- 1980: Irén Orosz-Árva
- 1981: Irén Orosz-Árva
- 1982: Erzsébet Juhász
- 1983: Erzsébet Ecseki-Juhász
- 1984: Xénia Siska
- 1985: Irma Könye
- 1986: Erzsébet Ecseki-Juhász
- 1987: Erzsébet Ecseki-Juhász
- 1988: Irma Könye
- 1989: Ágnes Kozáry
- 1990: Edit Molnár
- 1991: Edit Molnár
- 1992: Edit Molnár
- 1993: Éva Barati
- 1994: Éva Barati
- 1995: Éva Barati
- 1996: Éva Barati
- 1997: Éva Barati
- 1998: Éva Barati
- 1999: Tünde Vaszi
- 2000: Enikõ Szabó
- 2001: Krisztina Lõrincz
- 2002: Enikõ Szabó
- 2003: Enikõ Szabó
- 2004: Enikõ Szabó
- 2005: Enikõ Szabó
- 2006: Edit Vári

== 200 metres ==
- 1960: Antónia Munkácsi
- 1961: Erzsébet Bartos
- 1962: Erzsébet Bartos
- 1963: Erzsébet Bartos
- 1964: Margit Nemesházi
- 1965: Annamária Tóth
- 1966: Erzsébet Bartos
- 1967: Annamária Tóth
- 1968: Györgyi Balogh
- 1969: Györgyi Balogh
- 1970: Györgyi Balogh
- 1971: Györgyi Balogh
- 1972: Györgyi Balogh
- 1973: Judit Szabó
- 1974: Ildikó Szabó
- 1975: Irma Könye
- 1976: Irma Könye
- 1977: Ildikó Erdélyi
- 1978: Irén Orosz-Árva
- 1979: Irén Orosz-Árva
- 1980: Irén Orosz-Árva
- 1981: Irén Orosz-Árva
- 1982: Judit Forgács
- 1983: Judit Forgács
- 1984: Ibolya Petrika
- 1985: Irma Könye
- 1986: Judit Forgács
- 1987: Judit Acs
- 1988: Irma Könye
- 1989: Ágnes Kozáry
- 1990: Edit Molnár
- 1991: Edit Molnár
- 1992: Éva Barati
- 1993: Éva Barati
- 1994: Éva Barati
- 1995: Éva Barati
- 1996: Éva Barati
- 1997: Éva Barati
- 1998: Petronella Árva
- 1999: Krisztina Lõrincz
- 2000: Enikõ Szabó
- 2001: Barbara Petráhn
- 2002: Enikõ Szabó
- 2003: Enikõ Szabó
- 2004: Enikõ Szabó
- 2005: Nikolett Listár
- 2006: Nikolett Listár

== 400 metres ==
- 1960: Olga Kazi
- 1961: Ida Németh
- 1962: Antónia Munkácsi
- 1963: Olga Kazi
- 1964: Antónia Munkácsi
- 1965: Zsuzsa Szabó
- 1966: Zsuzsa Szabó
- 1967: Antónia Munkácsi
- 1968: Magdolna Lázár
- 1969: Magdolna Kulcsár
- 1970: Rozália Séfer
- 1971: Györgyi Balogh
- 1972: Györgyi Balogh
- 1973: Judit Szabó
- 1974: Irén Orosz-Árva
- 1975: Éva Tóth
- 1976: Éva Tóth
- 1977: Judit Forgács
- 1978: Ilona Pál
- 1979: Ilona Pál
- 1980: Ilona Pál
- 1981: Ibolya Petrika
- 1982: Judit Forgács
- 1983: Judit Forgács
- 1984: Ibolya Petrika
- 1985: Ibolya Petrika
- 1986: Judit Forgács
- 1987: Erzsébet Szabó
- 1988: Erzsébet Szabó
- 1989: Judit Forgács
- 1990: Judit Forgács
- 1991: Judit Forgács
- 1992: Judit Forgács
- 1993: Mónika Mádai
- 1994: Mónika Mádai
- 1995: Judit Szekeres
- 1996: Barbara Petráhn
- 1997: Judit Szekeres
- 1998: Judit Szekeres
- 1999: Judit Szekeres
- 2000: Barbara Petráhn
- 2001: Alice Kun
- 2002: Barbara Petráhn
- 2003: Barbara Petráhn
- 2004: Barbara Petráhn
- 2005: Barbara Petráhn
- 2006: Barbara Petráhn

== 800 metres ==
- 1960: Olga Kazi
- 1961: Olga Kazi
- 1962: Olga Kazi
- 1963: Olga Kazi
- 1964: Zsuzsa Szabó
- 1965: Olga Kazi
- 1966: Zsuzsa Szabó
- 1967: Sára Szenteleki-Ligetkuti
- 1968: Sára Szenteleki-Ligetkuti
- 1969: Mária Budavári
- 1970: Magdolna Kulcsár
- 1971: Magdolna Kulcsár
- 1972: Magdolna Kulcsár
- 1973: Márta Velekei
- 1974: Irén Lipcsei
- 1975: Magdolna Lázár
- 1976: Irén Lipcsei
- 1977: Irén Lipcsei
- 1978: Irén Lipcsei
- 1979: Éva Váczi
- 1980: Éva Koleszár
- 1981: Katalin Véninger
- 1982: Éva Mohácsi
- 1983: Katalin Szalai
- 1984: Katalin Szalai
- 1985: Elvira Biacsics
- 1986: Elvira Biacsics
- 1987: Erzsébet Szabó
- 1988: Erzsébet Todorán
- 1989: Erzsébet Szabó
- 1990: Erzsébet Szabó
- 1991: Erzsébet Szabó
- 1992: Viktória Barta
- 1993: Szilvia Csoszánszky
- 1994: Szilvia Csoszánszky
- 1995: Judit Varga
- 1996: Judit Varga
- 1997: Judit Varga
- 1998: Judit Varga
- 1999: Judit Varga
- 2000: Judit Varga
- 2001: Judit Varga
- 2002: Judit Varga
- 2003: Judit Varga
- 2004: Judit Varga
- 2005: Kitty Cziráki
- 2006: Boglárka Bozzay

== 1500 metres ==
- 1968: Olga Kazi
- 1969: Zsuzsa Völgyi
- 1970: Sára Szenteleki-Ligetkuti
- 1971: Sára Szenteleki-Ligetkuti
- 1972: Sára Szenteleki-Ligetkuti
- 1973: Márta Velekei
- 1974: Zsuzsa Völgyi
- 1975: Magdolna Lázár
- 1976: Magdolna Lázár
- 1977: Magdolna Lázár
- 1978: Magdolna Lázár
- 1979: Irén Lipcsei
- 1980: Éva Koleszár
- 1981: Katalin Véninger
- 1982: Katalin Véninger
- 1983: Katalin Szalai
- 1984: Katalin Szalai
- 1985: Erika Veréb
- 1986: Katalin Rácz
- 1987: Katalin Rácz
- 1988: Katalin Rácz
- 1989: Katalin Rácz
- 1990: Katalin Véninger
- 1991: Katalin Véninger
- 1992: Éva Dóczi
- 1993: Éva Dóczi
- 1994: Anikó Javos
- 1995: Viktória Barta
- 1996: Brigitta Tusai
- 1997: Brigitta Tusai
- 1998: Brigitta Tusai
- 1999: Brigitta Tusai
- 2000: Erika Csomor
- 2001: Lívia Tóth
- 2002: Lívia Tóth
- 2003: Krisztina Papp
- 2004: Lívia Tóth
- 2005: Krisztina Papp
- 2006: Krisztina Papp

== 3000 metres ==
- 1974: Zsuzsa Völgyi
- 1975: Zsuzsa Völgyi
- 1976: Borbála Csipán
- 1977: Zsuzsa Völgyi
- 1978: Zsuzsa Völgyi
- 1979: Magdolna Lázár
- 1980: Magdolna Lázár
- 1981: Antónia Ladányi
- 1982: Ilona Jankó
- 1983: Karolin Szabó
- 1984: Ilona Jankó
- 1985: Katalin Szalai
- 1986: Erika Veréb
- 1987: Karolin Szabó
- 1988: Erika Veréb
- 1989: Zita Ágoston
- 1990: Zita Ágoston
- 1991: Katalin Véninger
- 1992: Katalin Véninger
- 1993: Éva Dóczi
- 1994: Éva Dóczi
- 1995: Anikó Javos

== 5000 metres ==
- 1985: Márta Visnyei
- 1986: Erika Veréb
- 1987: Erika Veréb
- 1988: Erika Veréb
- 1989: Not held
- 1990: Not held
- 1991: Not held
- 1992: Not held
- 1993: Not held
- 1994: Not held
- 1995: Éva Dóczi
- 1996: Éva Dóczi
- 1997: Éva Dóczi
- 1998: Anikó Kálovics
- 1999: Katalin Szentgyörgyi
- 2000: Anikó Kálovics
- 2001: Simona Staicu
- 2002: Anikó Kálovics
- 2003: Anikó Kálovics
- 2004: Krisztina Papp
- 2005: Krisztina Papp
- 2006: Simona Staicu

== 10,000 metres ==
- 1983: Ilona Jankó
- 1984: Karolin Szabó
- 1985: Karolin Szabó
- 1986: Karolin Szabó
- 1987: Karolin Szabó
- 1988: Erika Veréb
- 1989: Zita Ágoston
- 1990: Heléna Barócsi
- 1991: Heléna Barócsi
- 1992: Márta Visnyei
- 1993: Heléna Barócsi
- 1994: Éva Dóczi
- 1995: Éva Dóczi
- 1996: Kornélia Pásztor
- 1997: Anikó Kálovics
- 1998: Anikó Kálovics
- 1999: Beáta Rakonczai
- 2000: Beáta Rakonczai
- 2001: Simona Staicu
- 2002: Krisztina Papp
- 2003: Simona Staicu
- 2004: Anikó Kálovics
- 2005: Krisztina Papp
- 2006: Krisztina Papp

== Half marathon ==
The course for the 2001 championship race was short of the half marathon distance.

- 1992: Márta Visnyei
- 1993: Heléna Barócsi
- 1994: Kornélia Pásztor
- 1995: Heléna Barócsi
- 1996: Éva Petrik
- 1997: Judit Földing-Nagy
- 1998: Judit Földing-Nagy
- 1999: Judit Földing-Nagy
- 2000: Erika Csomor
- 2001: Simona Staicu
- 2002: Judit Földing-Nagy
- 2003: Anikó Kálovics
- 2004: Anikó Kálovics
- 2005: Eszter Erdélyi

== Marathon ==
- 1981: Ágnes Öze-Sipka
- 1982: Karolin Szabó
- 1983: Ilona Danovszky-Zsilák
- 1984: Antónia Ladányi
- 1985: Ágnes Öze-Sipka
- 1986: Karolin Szabó
- 1987: Ágota Farkas
- 1988: Karolin Szabó
- 1989: Ágnes Öze-Sipka
- 1990: Enikõ Fehér
- 1991: Márta Visnyei
- 1992: Judit Földing-Nagy
- 1993: Márta Vass
- 1994: Gizella Molnár
- 1995: Ágota Farkas
- 1996: Gizella Molnár
- 1997: Ágnes Jakab
- 1998: Judit Földing-Nagy
- 1999: Erika Csomor
- 2000: Erika Csomor
- 2001: Judit Földing-Nagy
- 2002: Ida Kovács
- 2003: Judit Földing-Nagy
- 2004: Simona Staicu
- 2005: Ida Kovács
- 2006: Petra Teveli

== 3000 metres steeplechase ==
- 2002: Lívia Tóth
- 2003: Lívia Tóth
- 2004: Lívia Tóth
- 2005: Lívia Tóth
- 2006: Eszter Erdélyi

== 80 metres hurdles ==
- 1960: Ida Németh
- 1961: Klára Somogyi
- 1962: Ida Németh
- 1963: Vera Rózsavölgyi
- 1964: Ildikó Jónás
- 1965: Ildikó Jónás
- 1966: Annamária Tóth
- 1967: Annamária Tóth
- 1968: Györgyi Balogh

== 100 metres hurdles ==
- 1969: Annamária Tóth
- 1970: Mária Kiss
- 1971: Mária Kiss
- 1972: Ilona Bruzsenyák
- 1973: Ilona Bruzsenyák
- 1974: Ilona Bruzsenyák
- 1975: Ildikó Szabó
- 1976: Ilona Bruzsenyák
- 1977: Katalin Balogh
- 1978: Xénia Siska
- 1979: Margit Papp
- 1980: Xénia Siska
- 1981: Xénia Siska
- 1982: Xénia Siska
- 1983: Xénia Siska
- 1984: Xénia Siska
- 1985: Margit Palombi
- 1986: Xénia Siska
- 1987: Margit Palombi
- 1988: Xénia Siska
- 1989: Margit Palombi
- 1990: Andrea Kalamár
- 1991: Helga Drommer
- 1992: Helga Drommer
- 1993: Zita Bálint
- 1994: Zita Bálint
- 1995: Zita Bálint
- 1996: Zita Bálint
- 1997: Zita Bálint
- 1998: Zita Bálint
- 1999: Zita Bálint
- 2000: Zita Bálint
- 2001: Edit Vári
- 2002: Edit Vári
- 2003: Edit Vári
- 2004: Edit Vári
- 2005: Edit Vári
- 2006: Edit Vári

== 200 metres hurdles ==
- 1969: Mária Kiss

== 400 metres hurdles ==
- 1976: Éva Mohácsi
- 1977: Éva Mohácsi
- 1978: Éva Mohácsi
- 1979: Éva Mohácsi
- 1980: Éva Palanek
- 1981: Gertrud Gyovai & Éva Mohácsi
- 1982: Gertrud Gyovai
- 1983: Erika Szopori
- 1984: Erika Szopori
- 1985: Erika Szopori
- 1986: Éva Balázs
- 1987: Erika Szopori
- 1988: Zsófia Antók
- 1989: Zsófia Antók
- 1990: Judit Szekeres
- 1991: Judit Szekeres
- 1992: Gyöngyvér Csete
- 1993: Szilvia Ray
- 1994: Judit Szekeres
- 1995: Judit Szekeres
- 1996: Judit Szekeres
- 1997: Judit Szekeres
- 1998: Judit Szekeres
- 1999: Szilvia Ray
- 2000: Orsolya Dóczi
- 2001: Orsolya Dóczi
- 2002: Judit Vékony
- 2003: Dóra Horváth
- 2004: Réka Skoumal
- 2005: Andrea Pék
- 2006: Réka Skoumal

== High jump ==
- 1960: Márta Keresztes
- 1961: Éva Szilas
- 1962: Éva Mihályfi
- 1963: Éva Gelei
- 1964: Éva Gelei
- 1965: Éva Tóth
- 1966: Anna Noszály
- 1967: Anna Noszály
- 1968: Magdolna Komka
- 1969: Magdolna Komka
- 1970: Magdolna Komka
- 1971: Erika Rudolf
- 1972: Magdolna Komka
- 1973: Andrea Mátay
- 1974: Andrea Kreisz
- 1975: Andrea Mátay
- 1976: Erika Rudolf
- 1977: Andrea Mátay
- 1978: Andrea Mátay
- 1979: Andrea Mátay
- 1980: Katalin Sterk
- 1981: Emese Béla
- 1982: Katalin Sterk
- 1983: Emese Béla
- 1984: Olga Juha
- 1985: Andrea Mátay
- 1986: Katalin Sterk
- 1987: Olga Juha
- 1988: Katalin Sterk
- 1989: Judit Kovács
- 1990: Judit Kovács
- 1991: Judit Kovács
- 1992: Judit Kovács
- 1993: Krisztina Solti
- 1994: Erzsébet Fazekas
- 1995: Erzsébet Fazekas
- 1996: Dóra Győrffy
- 1997: Dóra Győrffy
- 1998: Dóra Győrffy
- 1999: Dóra Győrffy
- 2000: Dóra Győrffy
- 2001: Dóra Győrffy
- 2002: Dóra Győrffy
- 2003: Dóra Győrffy
- 2004: Bernadett Bódi
- 2005: Dóra Győrffy
- 2006: Dóra Győrffy

== Pole vault ==
- 1995: Zsuzsanna Szabó-Olgyai
- 1996: Zsuzsanna Szabó-Olgyai
- 1997: Eszter Szemerédi
- 1998: Zsuzsanna Szabó-Olgyai
- 1999: Zsuzsanna Szabó-Olgyai
- 2000: Zsuzsanna Szabó-Olgyai
- 2001: Krisztina Molnár
- 2002: Krisztina Molnár
- 2003: Zsuzsanna Szabó-Olgyai
- 2004: Krisztina Molnár
- 2005: Krisztina Molnár
- 2006: Krisztina Molnár

== Long jump ==
- 1960: Vera Rózsavölgyi
- 1961: Vera Rózsavölgyi
- 1962: Orsolya Petró
- 1963: Vera Rózsavölgyi
- 1964: Eta Kispál
- 1965: Annamária Tóth
- 1966: Eta Kispál
- 1967: Eta Kispál
- 1968: Eta Kispál
- 1969: Annamária Tóth
- 1970: Eta Kispál
- 1971: Klára Woth
- 1972: Anikó Ziegner
- 1973: Margit Papp
- 1974: Ilona Bruzsenyák
- 1975: Ildikó Szabó
- 1976: Ildikó Erdélyi
- 1977: Ildikó Erdélyi
- 1978: Mária Pap
- 1979: Margit Papp
- 1980: Zsuzsa Vanyek
- 1981: Klára Novobáczky
- 1982: Zsuzsa Vanyek
- 1983: Zsuzsa Vanyek
- 1984: Klára Novobáczky
- 1985: Zsuzsa Vanyek
- 1986: Ildikó Fekete
- 1987: Zsuzsa Vanyek
- 1988: Zsuzsa Vanyek
- 1989: Zsuzsa Vanyek
- 1990: Zsuzsa Vanyek
- 1991: Zsuzsa Vanyek
- 1992: Zsuzsa Vanyek
- 1993: Rita Ináncsi
- 1994: Rita Ináncsi
- 1995: Rita Ináncsi
- 1996: Tünde Vaszi
- 1997: Tünde Vaszi
- 1998: Tünde Vaszi
- 1999: Tünde Vaszi
- 2000: Zita Ajkler
- 2001: Tünde Vaszi
- 2002: Tünde Vaszi
- 2003: Tünde Vaszi
- 2004: Tünde Vaszi
- 2005: Tünde Vaszi
- 2006: Tünde Vaszi

== Triple jump ==
- 1991: Ildikó Fekete
- 1992: Ildikó Fekete
- 1993: Ildikó Fekete
- 1994: Éva Medovárszky
- 1995: Tünde Vaszi
- 1996: Zita Bálint
- 1997: Zita Bálint
- 1998: Zita Bálint
- 1999: Zita Bálint
- 2000: Zita Ajkler
- 2001: Zita Ajkler
- 2002: Zita Ajkler
- 2003: Éva Miklós
- 2004: Zita Ajkler
- 2005: Zita Ajkler
- 2006: Zita Ajkler

== Shot put ==
- 1960: Jolán Kleiber-Kontsek
- 1961: Jolán Kleiber-Kontsek
- 1962: Judit Bognár
- 1963: Judit Bognár
- 1964: Judit Bognár
- 1965: Judit Bognár
- 1966: Judit Bognár
- 1967: Judit Bognár
- 1968: Judit Bognár
- 1969: Judit Nagy
- 1970: Judit Bognár
- 1971: Judit Bognár
- 1972: Judit Bognár
- 1973: Judit Bognár
- 1974: Judit Bognár
- 1975: Margit Irányi
- 1976: Margit Irányi
- 1977: Edit Armuth
- 1978: Margit Irányi
- 1979: Edit Armuth
- 1980: Viktória Horváth
- 1981: Viktória Horváth
- 1982: Viktória Horváth
- 1983: Viktória Horváth
- 1984: Hajnal Herth
- 1985: Hajnal Herth
- 1986: Márta Kripli
- 1987: Viktória Szélinger
- 1988: Viktória Szélinger
- 1989: Viktória Horváth
- 1990: Viktória Horváth
- 1991: Viktória Horváth
- 1992: Mónika Stefanovics
- 1993: Hajnal Vörös
- 1994: Hajnal Vörös
- 1995: Hajnal Vörös
- 1996: Rita Ináncsi
- 1997: Éva Kürti
- 1998: Katalin Divós
- 1999: Katalin Divós
- 2000: Katalin Divós
- 2001: Éva Kürti
- 2002: Éva Kürti
- 2003: Éva Kürti
- 2004: Éva Kürti
- 2005: Éva Kürti
- 2006: Anita Márton

== Discus throw ==
- 1960: Jolán Kleiber-Kontsek
- 1961: Jolán Kleiber-Kontsek
- 1962: Jolán Kleiber-Kontsek
- 1963: Judit Stugner
- 1964: Jolán Kleiber
- 1965: Jolán Kleiber
- 1966: Jolán Kleiber
- 1967: Jolán Kleiber
- 1968: Jolán Kleiber
- 1969: Judit Stugner
- 1970: Jolán Kleiber
- 1971: Jolán Kleiber
- 1972: Jolán Kleiber
- 1973: Judit Bognár
- 1974: Zsuzsa Pallay
- 1975: Róza Czabán
- 1976: Ágnes Herczegh
- 1977: Ágnes Herczegh
- 1978: Ágnes Herczegh
- 1979: Katalin Tóth
- 1980: Ágnes Herczegh
- 1981: Zsuzsa Pallay
- 1982: Ágnes Herczegh
- 1983: Márta Kripli
- 1984: Márta Kripli
- 1985: Márta Kripli
- 1986: Márta Kripli
- 1987: Ágnes Herczeg
- 1988: Márta Bacskai
- 1989: Ágnes Herczegh
- 1990: Ágnes Herczegh
- 1991: Ágnes Herczegh
- 1992: Katalin Tóth
- 1993: Katalin Csöke
- 1994: Katalin Csöke
- 1995: Katalin Csöke
- 1996: Katalin Csöke
- 1997: Katalin Csöke
- 1998: Katalin Divós
- 1999: Katalin Divós
- 2000: Katalin Divós
- 2001: Éva Kürti
- 2002: Éva Kürti
- 2003: Éva Kürti
- 2004: Éva Kürti
- 2005: Katalin Divós
- 2006: Katalin Máté

== Hammer throw ==
- 1996: Katalin Divós
- 1997: Katalin Divós
- 1998: Katalin Divós
- 1999: Katalin Divós
- 2000: Katalin Divós
- 2001: Barbara Sugár
- 2002: Julianna Tudja
- 2003: Katalin Divós
- 2004: Katalin Divós
- 2005: Éva Orbán
- 2006: Éva Orbán

== Javelin throw ==
- 1960: Márta Antal
- 1961: Márta Antal
- 1962: Márta Antal
- 1963: Zsuzsa Dusnoki
- 1964: Márta Rudas
- 1965: Márta Rudas
- 1966: Márta Rudas
- 1967: Ágnes Radnai
- 1968: Angéla Németh
- 1969: Angéla Németh
- 1970: Magda Paulányi
- 1971: Angéla Németh
- 1972: Magda Paulányi
- 1973: Mária Kucserka
- 1974: Mária Vágó
- 1975: Mária Vágó
- 1976: Viktória Fekete
- 1977: Aranka Vágási
- 1978: Mária Janák
- 1979: Viktória Fekete
- 1980: Aranka Vágási
- 1981: Mária Janák
- 1982: Mária Janák
- 1983: Mária Janák
- 1984: Katalin Hartai
- 1985: Éva Budavári
- 1986: Zsuzsa Malovecz
- 1987: Zsuzsa Malovecz
- 1988: Katalin Hartai
- 1989: Zsuzsa Malovecz
- 1990: Katalin Hartai
- 1991: Kinga Zsigmond
- 1992: Kinga Zsigmond
- 1993: Kinga Zsigmond
- 1994: Kinga Zsigmond
- 1995: Kinga Zsigmond
- 1996: Ágnes Preisinger
- 1997: Nikolett Szabó
- 1998: Nikolett Szabó
- 1999: Nikolett Szabó
- 2000: Nikolett Szabó
- 2001: Nikolett Szabó
- 2002: Xénia Frajka
- 2003: Nikolett Szabó
- 2004: Nikolett Szabó
- 2005: Nikolett Szabó
- 2006: Xénia Frajka

== Pentathlon ==
- 1960: Erzsébet Oo
- 1961: Klára Somogyi
- 1962: Ida Németh
- 1963: Vera Rózsavölgyi
- 1964: Annamária Tóth
- 1965: Annamária Tóth
- 1966: Annamária Tóth
- 1967: Annamária Tóth
- 1968: Margit Papp
- 1969: Annamária Tóth
- 1970: Margit Papp
- 1971: Ilona Bruzsenyák
- 1972: Ilona Bruzsenyák
- 1973: Ilona Bruzsenyák
- 1974: Ilona Bruzsenyák
- 1975: Ilona Bruzsenyák
- 1976: Margit Papp
- 1977: Margit Papp
- 1978: Margit Papp
- 1979: Zsuzsa Czene
- 1980: Margit Papp

== Heptathlon ==
- 1981: Zsuzsa Vanyek
- 1982: Zsuzsa Vanyek
- 1983: Gabriella Bebesi
- 1984: Zsuzsa Vanyek
- 1985: Zsuzsa Vanyek
- 1986: Margit Palombi
- 1987: Zsuzsa Vanyek
- 1988: Margit Palombi
- 1989: Rita Ináncsi
- 1990: Zita Bálint
- 1991: Rita Ináncsi
- 1992: Rita Ináncsi
- 1993: Rita Ináncsi
- 1994: Enikõ Kiss
- 1995: Vera Ináncsi
- 1996: Zita Bálint
- 1997: Zita Bálint
- 1998: Zita Bálint
- 1999: Enikõ Kiss
- 2000: Enikõ Kiss
- 2001: Zita Ajkler
- 2002: Réka Skoumal
- 2003: Katalin Deák
- 2004: Zita Óvári
- 2005: Zita Óvári
- 2006: Zita Ajkler

== 10 kilometres walk ==
- 1984: Dana Vavřačová (TCH)
- 1985: Andrea Alföldi
- 1986: Rudolfne Hudi
- 1987: Andrea Alföldi
- 1988: Anikó Szebenszky
- 1989: Mária Urbanik
- 1990: Mária Urbanik
- 1991: Ibolya Váradi
- 1992: Andrea Alföldi
- 1993: Mária Urbanik
- 1994: Mária Urbanik
- 1995: Mária Urbanik
- 1996: Anikó Szebenszky
- 1997: Anikó Szebenszky
- 1998: Anikó Szebenszky
- 1999: Mónika Pesti
- 2000: Mónika Pesti
- 2001: Mária Urbanik
- 2002: Edina Füsti
- 2003: Ildikó Ilyés
- 2004: Edina Füsti
- 2005: Ildikó Ilyés
- 2006: Ildikó Ilyés

== 20 kilometres walk ==
- 1995: Ildikó Ilyés
- 1996: Mária Urbanik
- 1997: Mónika Pesti
- 1998: Mónika Pesti
- 1999: Mária Urbanik
- 2000: Anikó Szebenszky
- 2001: Mária Urbanik
- 2002: Edina Füsti
- 2003: Katalin Varró
- 2004: Ildikó Ilyés
- 2005: Ildikó Ilyés
- 2006: Dóra Nemere

== Cross country ==
- 1960: Aranka Kazi
- 1961: Aranka Kazi
- 1962: Olga Kazi
- 1963: Mária Tóth
- 1964: Zsuzsa Szabó
- 1965: Sára Szenteleki-Ligetkuti
- 1966: Katalin Nagy
- 1967: Mária Tóth
- 1968: Ilona Zsilák
- 1969: Magdolna Kulcsár
- 1970: Borbála Csipán
- 1971: Zsuzsa Völgyi
- 1972: Borbála Csipán
- 1973: Zsuzsa Völgyi
- 1974: Zsuzsa Völgyi
- 1975: Magdolna Lázár
- 1976: Magdolna Lázár
- 1977: Magdolna Lázár
- 1978: Magdolna Lázár
- 1979: Janka Horváth
- 1980: Antónia Ladányi
- 1981: Antónia Ladányi
- 1982: Ilona Jankó
- 1983: Ilona Jankó
- 1984: Katalin Szalai
- 1985: Ilona Jankó
- 1986: Erika Veréb
- 1987: Erika Veréb
- 1988: Heléna Barócsi
- 1989: Márta Visnyei
- 1990: Márta Visnyei
- 1991: Heléna Barócsi
- 1992: Anikó Javos
- 1993: Judit Földing-Nagy
- 1994: Éva Dóczi
- 1995: Éva Dóczi
- 1996: Éva Dóczi
- 1997: Éva Dóczi
- 1998: Anikó Kálovics
- 1999: Judit Földing-Nagy
- 2000: Simona Staicu
- 2001: Beáta Rakonczai
- 2002: Simona Staicu
- 2003: Simona Staicu
- 2004: Anikó Kálovics
- 2005: Krisztina Papp
- 2006: Krisztina Papp
