= 1981 European Cup "A" Final =

These are the full results of the 1981 European Cup "A" Final in athletics which was held at the Stadion Maksimir on 15 and 16 August 1981 in Zagreb, Yugoslavia.

== Team standings ==
Men
Pos.	Nation	Points
1	East Germany	128
2	Soviet Union	124.5
3	Great Britain	106.5
4	West Germany	97
5	Italy	75
6	Poland	74
7	France	71
8	Yugoslavia	41

Women
Pos.	Nation	Points
1	East Germany	108.5
2	Soviet Union	97
3	West Germany	74
	Great Britain	74
5	Bulgaria	72
6	Poland	53.5
7	Hungary	41
8	Yugoslavia	20

== Men's results ==
=== 100 metres ===
15 August
Wind: -0.9 m/s

Rank	Lane	Name	Nationality	Time	Notes	Points
1	1	Allan Wells	Great Britain	10.17		8
2	3	Frank Emmelmann	East Germany	10.21		7
3	4	Herman Panzo	France	10.29		6
4	8	Marian Woronin	Poland	10.31		5
5	7	Vladimir Muravyov	Soviet Union	10.50		4
6	2	Christian Haas	West Germany	10.51		3
7	6	Pierfrancesco Pavoni	Italy	10.67		2
8	5	Aleksandar Popović	Yugoslavia	10.81		1

=== 200 metres ===
16 August
Wind: +0.3 m/s

Rank	Lane	Name	Nationality	Time	Notes	Points
1	4	Frank Emmelmann	East Germany	20.33		8
2	2	Allan Wells	Great Britain	20.35		7
3	5	Patrick Barré	France	20.60		6
4	3	Erwin Skamrahl	West Germany	20.61		5
5	8	Yuriy Naumenko	Soviet Union	20.69		4
6	7	Giovanni Bongiorni	Italy	20.87		3
7	1	Leszek Dunecki	Poland	20.91		2
8	6	Dragan Zarić	Yugoslavia	21.13		1

=== 400 metres ===
15 August

Rank	Name	Nationality	Time	Notes	Points
1	Hartmut Weber	West Germany	45.32		8
2	Mauro Zuliani	Italy	45.35		7
3	Andreas Knebel	East Germany	45.72		6
4	David Jenkins	Great Britain	45.86		5
5	Pavel Roshchin	Soviet Union	46.03		4
6	Josip Alebić	Yugoslavia	46.20		3
7	Paul Bourdin	France	46.34		2
8	Andrzej Stępień	Poland	46.38		1

=== 800 metres ===
16 August

Rank	Name	Nationality	Time	Notes	Points
1	Sebastian Coe	Great Britain	1:47.03		8
2	Willi Wülbeck	West Germany	1:47.72		7
3	Olaf Beyer	East Germany	1:47.73		6
4	Nikolay Kirov	Soviet Union	1:48.12		5
5	Philippe Dupont	France	1:48.92		4
6	Dragan Životić	Yugoslavia	1:49.10		3
7	Stanisław Rzeźniczak	Poland	1:49.35		2
8	Carlo Grippo	Italy	1:50.83		1

=== 1500 metres ===
16 August

Rank	Name	Nationality	Time	Notes	Points
1	Olaf Beyer	East Germany	3:43.52		8
2	Nikolay Kirov	Soviet Union	3:43.68		7
3	Steve Cram	Great Britain	3:43.72		6
4	Alexandre Gonzalez	France	3:44.46		5
5	Vittorio Fontanella	Italy	3:44.75		4
6	Mirosław Żerkowski	Poland	3:45.47		3
7	Dragan Zdravković	Yugoslavia	3:45.84		2
8	Harald Hudak	West Germany	3:45.90		1

=== 5000 metres ===
16 August

Rank	Name	Nationality	Time	Notes	Points
1	Dave Moorcroft	Great Britain	13:43.18		8
2	Valeriy Abramov	Soviet Union	13:43.69		7
3	Hansjörg Kunze	East Germany	13:43.72		6
4	Francis Gonzalez	France	13:44.11		5
5	Thomas Wessinghage	West Germany	13:44.56		4
6	Alberto Cova	Italy	13:45.48		3
7	Daniel Jańczuk	Poland	14:02.78		2
8	Dragan Zdravković	Yugoslavia	14:27.67		1

=== 10,000 metres ===
15 August

Rank	Name	Nationality	Time	Notes	Points
1	Werner Schildhauer	East Germany	28:45.89		8
2	Julian Goater	Great Britain	28:55.04		7
3	Karl Fleschen	West Germany	28:57.74		6
4	Enn Sellik	Soviet Union	29:17.65		5
5	Philippe Legrand	France	29:18.30		4
6	Jerzy Kowol	Poland	29:41.40		3
7	Giuseppe Gerbi	Italy	30:21.53		2
8	Savo Alempić	Yugoslavia	31:11.91		1

=== 110 metres hurdles ===
16 August
Wind: -0.6 m/s

Rank	Name	Nationality	Time	Notes	Points
1	Mark Holtom	Great Britain	13.79		8
2	Andreas Schlißke	East Germany	13.85		7
3	Romuald Giegiel	Poland	13.88		6
4	Daniele Fontecchio	Italy	13.96		5
5	Georgiy Shabanov	Soviet Union	14.02		4
6	Borislav Pisić	Yugoslavia	14.15		3
7	Karl-Werner Dönges	West Germany	14.28		2
8	Philippe Hatil	France	14.35		1

=== 400 metres hurdles ===
15 August

Rank	Name	Nationality	Time	Notes	Points
1	Volker Beck	East Germany	48.94		8
2	Harald Schmid	West Germany	49.12		7
3	Dmitriy Shkarupin	Soviet Union	49.71		6
4	Ryszard Szparak	Poland	50.12		5
5	Gary Oakes	Great Britain	50.81		4
6	Serge Guillen	France	51.16		3
7	Saverio Gellini	Italy	52.20		2
8	Suvad Kestenović	Yugoslavia	55.66		1

=== 3000 metres steeplechase ===
16 August

Rank	Name	Nationality	Time	Notes	Points
1	Mariano Scartezzini	Italy	8:13.32	CR	8
2	Bogusław Mamiński	Poland	8:17.23		7
3	Patriz Ilg	West Germany	8:21.13		6
4	Sergey Yepishin	Soviet Union	8:22.49		5
5	Ralf Pönitzsch	East Germany	8:23.14		4
6	Joseph Mahmoud	France	8:38.59		3
7	Roger Hackney	Great Britain	8:55.95		2
8	Vinko Pokrajčić	Yugoslavia	9:20.30		1

=== 4 × 100 metres relay ===
15 August

Rank	Nation	Athletes	Time	Note	Points
1	Poland	Krzysztof Zwoliński, Zenon Licznerski, Leszek Dunecki, Marian Woronin	38.66		8
2	Soviet Union	Andrey Shlyapnikov, Nikolay Sidorov, Aleksandr Aksinin, Vladimir Muravyov	38.80		7
3	France	Philippe Lejoncour, Bernard Petitbois, Antoine Richard, Herman Panzo	38.83		6
4	Great Britain	Drew McMaster, Mike McFarlane, Cameron Sharp, Steve Green	39.04		5
5	West Germany	Ingo Froböse, Peter Klein, Karl-Heinz Weisenseel, Christian Haas	39.05		4
6	East Germany	Frank Hollender, Detlef Kübeck, Bernhard Hoff, Frank Emmelmann	39.37		3
7	Italy	Massimo Clementoni, Giovanni Bongiorni, Stefano Curini, Carlo Simionato	39.75		2
8	Yugoslavia	Mladen Nikolić, Dragan Zarić, Aleksandar Popović, Nenad Milinkov	40.04		1

=== 4 × 400 metres relay ===
16 August

Rank	Nation	Athletes	Time	Note	Points
1	Italy	Stefano Malinverni, Alfonso Di Guida, Roberto Ribaud, Mauro Zuliani	3:01.42	NR	8
2	Soviet Union	Pavel Roshchin, Vitaliy Fedotov, Viktor Burakov, Viktor Markin	3:01.69		7
3	Great Britain	Roy Dickens, Garry Cook, Steve Scutt, David Jenkins	3:01.69		6
4	East Germany	Frank Richter, Carsten Petters, Volker Beck, Andreas Knebel	3:03.80		5
5	West Germany	Martin Weppler, Erwin Skamrahl, Thomas Giessing, Hartmut Weber	3:03.82		4
6	France	Pascal Barré, Hector Llatser, Didier Dubois, Paul Bourdin	3:04.61		3
7	Poland	Jerzy Pietrzyk, Ryszard Wichrowski, Zbigniew Rytel, Andrzej Stępień	3:04.71		2
8	Yugoslavia	Slobodan Popović, Goran Humar, Željko Knapić, Josip Alebić	3:05.69		1

=== High jump ===
15 August

Rank	Name	Nationality	Result	Notes	Points
1	Valeriy Sereda	Soviet Union	2.30		8
2	Gerd Nagel	West Germany	2.28		7
3	Massimo Di Giorgio	Italy	2.26		6
4	Jörg Freimuth	East Germany	2.24		5
5	Janusz Trzepizur	Poland	2.21		4
6	Franck Bonnet	France	2.18		3
7	Mark Naylor	Great Britain	2.18		2
8	Danial Temim	Yugoslavia	2.15		1

=== Pole vault ===
16 August

Rank	Name	Nationality	Result	Notes	Points
1	Jean-Michel Bellot	France	5.40		8
2	Konstantin Volkov	Soviet Union	5.40		7
3	Keith Stock	Great Britain	5.30		6
4	Axel Weber	East Germany	5.20		5
5	Mauro Barella	Italy	5.20		4
6	Miran Bizjak	Yugoslavia	4.40		3
	Günther Lohre	West Germany	NM		0
	Władysław Kozakiewicz	Poland	NM		0

=== Long jump ===
15 August

Rank	Name	Nationality	#1	#2	#3	#4	#5	#6	Result	Notes	Points
1	Uwe Lange	East Germany	7.65	7.58	7.74	7.85	7.90	7.98	7.98		8
2	Shamil Abbyasov	Soviet Union	7.53	7.69	7.86	7.84	7.93	7.93	7.93		7
3	Joachim Busse	West Germany	7.82w	7.44	x	7.61	7.70	x	7.82w		6
4	Roy Mitchell	Great Britain	x	7.40	7.68	7.50	7.79	7.74	7.79		5
5	Stanisław Jaskułka	Poland	7.53	7.37	7.78	x	7.74	x	7.78		4
6	Denis Pinabel	France	7.24	7.54	7.27	7.55	7.55	7.42	7.55		3
7	Nenad Stekić	Yugoslavia	7.49	x	x	x	x	x	7.49		2
8	Giovanni Evangelisti	Italy	7.39	x	7.34	x	7.34	7.30	7.39		1

=== Triple jump ===
16 August

Rank	Name	Nationality	#1	#2	#3	#4	#5	#6	Result	Notes	Points
1	Jaak Uudmäe	Soviet Union	16.97	16.08	x	x	x	x	16.97		8
2	Aston Moore	Great Britain	16.63	x	16.51	16.86	16.54	16.68	16.86		7
3	Miloš Srejović	Yugoslavia	15.99	15.83	15.91	16.54	16.26	16.50	16.54		6
4	Paolo Piapan	Italy	16.05	16.37	16.04	x	16.17	x	16.37		5
5	Lutz Dombrowski	East Germany	16.20	16.08	15.96	15.55	15.99	16.16	16.20		4
6	Peter Bouschen	West Germany	15.89	x	15.29	16.10	15.87	15.96	16.10		3
7	Zdzisław Hoffmann	Poland	x	15.90	x	15.98	x	15.99	15.99		2
8	Henri Dorina	France	15.56	x	15.77	x	15.95	x	15.95		1

=== Shot put ===
15 August

Rank	Name	Nationality	#1	#2	#3	#4	#5	#6	Result	Notes	Points
1	Udo Beyer	East Germany	20.41	20.77	21.41	x	20.31	21.03	21.41		8
2	Yevgeniy Mironov	Soviet Union	19.41	19.85	19.80	20.33	19.32	20.33		7	
3	Ralf Reichenbach	West Germany	19.70	19.42	x	x	x	x	19.70		6
4	Luc Viudès	France	19.07	19.14	19.02	19.50	19.35	18.93	19.50		5
5	Zlatan Saračević	Yugoslavia	19.38	x	19.25	19.07	x	x	19.38		4
6	Janusz Gassowski	Poland	18.58	18.69	x	19.01	18.96	x	19.01		3
7	Luigi De Santis	Italy	x	18.23	18.26	18.14	x	18.27	18.27		2
8	Simon Rodhouse	Great Britain	17.90	x	17.74	x	17.71	17.34	17.90		1

=== Discus throw ===
16 August

Rank	Name	Nationality	#1	#2	#3	#4	#5	#6	Result	Notes	Points
1	Armin Lemme	East Germany	63.88	64.06	62.58	63.44	x	62.54	64.06		8
2	Dmitriy Kovtsun	Soviet Union	59.32	59.18	59.60	59.16	59.26	58.68	59.60		7
3	Alwin Wagner	West Germany	58.08	59.16	x	x	x	x	59.16		6
4	Stanislaw Wołodko	Poland	57.10	x	58.84	x	58.94	58.40	58.94		5
5	Bob Weir	Great Britain	55.62	54.86	55.60	56.36	54.22	x	56.36		4
6	Armando De Vincentis	Italy	54.20	55.18	x	55.80	54.20	x	55.80		3
7	Frédéric Piette	France	54.56	54.46	51.40	54.16	51.00	x	54.56		2
8	Željko Tarabarić	Yugoslavia	51.08	51.80	x	x	53.38	x	53.38		1

=== Hammer throw ===
16 August

Rank	Name	Nationality	#1	#2	#3	#4	#5	#6	Result	Notes	Points
1	Yuriy Sedykh	Soviet Union	75.48	77.54	77.52	77.34	76.06	77.68	77.68		8
2	Karl-Hans Riehm	West Germany	74.28	75.48	73.86	75.86	73.86	x	75.86		7
3	Roland Steuk	East Germany	70.26	72.66	72.94	x	72.50	73.34	73.34		6
4	Giampaolo Urlando	Italy	70.74	72.28	72.88	71.10	69.86	70.94	72.88		5
5	Mariusz Tomaszewski	Poland	69.02	69.08	69.08	70.70	70.50	68.38	70.70		4
6	Martin Girvan	Great Britain	62.44	67.48	69.52	68.10	68.44	67.84	69.52		3
7	Srećko Štiglić	Yugoslavia	68.22	x	65.86	64.88	66.92	66.24	68.22		2
8	Jacques Accambray	France	62.38	62.30	x	64.38	64.16	x	64.38		1

=== Javelin throw ===
15 August – Old model

Rank	Name	Nationality	#1	#2	#3	#4	#5	#6	Result	Notes	Points
1	Detlef Michel	East Germany	90.86	88.78	85.00	x	83.78	x	90.86		8
2	Dainis Kūla	Soviet Union	82.04	x	x	87.00	x	88.40	88.40		7
3	Michał Wacławik	Poland	x	x	79.42	x	86.26	83.82	86.26		6
4	Klaus Tafelmeier	West Germany	x	84.86	82.24	84.58	83.28	x	84.58		5
5	David Ottley	Great Britain	x	80.10	82.00	84.30	x	x	84.30		4
6	Darko Cujnik	Yugoslavia	75.58	76.10	75.86	x	83.56	x	83.56	NR	3
7	Agostino Ghesini	Italy	x	77.84	75.52	x	x	80.00	80.00		2
8	Penisio Lutui	France	76.64	76.84	78.90	x	79.30	78.96	79.30		1

== Women's results ==
=== 100 metres ===
15 August
Wind: -1.0 m/s

Rank	Name	Nationality	Time	Notes	Points
1	Marlies Göhr	East Germany	11.17		8
2	Kathy Smallwood	Great Britain	11.27		7
3	Olga Zolotaryeva	Soviet Union	11.36		6
4	Sofka Popova	Bulgaria	11.43		5
5	Monika Hirsch	West Germany	11.48		4
6	Irén Orosz	Hungary	11.61		3
7	Dijana Istvanović	Yugoslavia	11.66		2
8	Iwona Pakuła	Poland	11.83		1

=== 200 metres ===
16 August
Wind: -1.6 m/s

Rank	Name	Nationality	Time	Notes	Points
1	Bärbel Wöckel	East Germany	22.19		8
2	Kathy Smallwood	Great Britain	22.65		7
3	Natalya Bochina	Soviet Union	23.08		6
4	Claudia Steger	West Germany	23.09		5
5	Irén Orosz	Hungary	23.15		4
6	Galina Encheva	Bulgaria	23.18		3
7	Dijana Istvanović	Yugoslavia	23.81		2
8	Iwona Pakuła	Poland	23.84		1

=== 400 metres ===
15 August

Rank	Name	Nationality	Time	Notes	Points
1	Marita Koch	East Germany	49.43		8
2	Gaby Bußmann	West Germany	50.83	NR	7
3	Irina Nazarova	Soviet Union	51.31		6
4	Joslyn Hoyte-Smith	Great Britain	51.47		5
5	Grażyna Oliszewska	Poland	53.02		4
6	Ivanka Venkova	Bulgaria	53.11		3
7	Ibolya Petrika	Hungary	53.52		2
8	Nataša Seliškar	Yugoslavia	54.94		1

=== 800 metres ===
15 August

Rank	Name	Nationality	Time	Notes	Points
1	Martina Steuk	East Germany	1:57.16		8
2	Lyudmila Veselkova	Soviet Union	1:57.25		7
3	Jolanta Januchta	Poland	1:58.30		6
4	Margrit Klinger	West Germany	1:59.54		5
5	Christina Boxer	Great Britain	2:00.03		4
6	Svetla Zlateva	Bulgaria	2:00.03		3
7	Katalin Weninger	Hungary	2:07.16		2
8	Zora Tomecić	Yugoslavia	2:11.40		1

=== 1500 metres ===
16 August

Rank	Name	Nationality	Time	Notes	Points
1	Tamara Sorokina	Soviet Union	4:01.37		8
2	Ulrike Bruns	East Germany	4:02.21		7
3	Anna Bukis	Poland	4:04.38		6
4	Brigitte Kraus	West Germany	4:05.47		5
5	Vanya Gospodinova	Bulgaria	4:07.09		4
6	Katalin Weninger	Hungary	4:08.69	NR	3
7	Gillian Dainty	Great Britain	4:12.86		2
8	Zdravka Ristićević	Yugoslavia	4:28.06		1

=== 3000 metres ===
16 August

Rank	Name	Nationality	Time	Notes	Points
1	Angelika Zauber	East Germany	8:49.61		8
2	Yelena Sipatova	Soviet Union	8:49.99		7
3	Paula Fudge	Great Britain	8:54.59		6
4	Nikolina Shtereva	Bulgaria	9:11.84		5
5	Vera Steiert	West Germany	9:14.29		4
6	Erzsébet Jakab	Hungary	9:15.83		3
7	Breda Pergar	Yugoslavia	9:26.32		2
8	Celina Sokołowska	Poland	9:28.30		1

=== 100 metres hurdles ===
16 August
Wind: -2.4 m/s

Rank	Name	Nationality	Time	Notes	Points
1	Tatyana Anisimova	Soviet Union	12.91		8
2	Kerstin Knabe	East Germany	13.08		7
3	Lucyna Langer	Poland	13.20		6
4	Shirley Strong	Great Britain	13.21		5
5	Yordanka Donkova	Bulgaria	13.69		4
6	Sylvia Kempin	East Germany	13.72		3
7	Xénia Siska	Hungary	14.08		2
8	Margita Papić	Yugoslavia	14.17		1

=== 400 metres hurdles ===
15 August

Rank	Name	Nationality	Time	Notes	Points
1	Ellen Fiedler	East Germany	54.90		8
2	Anna Kastetskaya	Soviet Union	56.34		7
3	Genowefa Błaszak	Poland	57.21		6
4	Yvette Wray	Great Britain	57.62		5
5	Nadezhda Asenova	Soviet Union	58.02		4
6	Silvia Hollmann	West Germany	58.13		3
7	Mojca Šavle	Yugoslavia	59.72		2
8	Éva Mohácsi	Hungary	59.99		1

=== 4 × 100 metres relay ===
15 August

Rank	Nation	Athletes	Time	Note	Points
1	East Germany	Annelies Walter, Bärbel Wockel, Gesine Walther, Marlies Göhr	42.53		8
2	Great Britain	Wendy Hoyte, Kathy Smallwood, Bev Goddard, Shirley Thomas	43.03		7
3	Soviet Union	Olga Zolotaryeva, Olga Nasonova, Lyudmila Kondratyeva, Natalya Bochina	43.26		6
4	West Germany	Monika Hirsch, Ulrike Sommer, Helke Gaugel, Claudia Steger	43.74		5
5	Bulgaria	Nadezhda Georgieva, Galina Encheva, Pepa Pavlova, Anelia Nuneva	44.24		4
6	Hungary	Xénia Siska, Erzsébet Juhász, Piroska Hracs, Irén Orosz	45.75		3
7	Yugoslavia	Mojca Cetina, Dijana Istvanović, Saša Kranjc, Nataša Seliškar	45.97		2
8	Poland	Iwona Pakuła, Elżbieta Rabsztyn, Danuta Perka, Lucyna Langer	46.03		1

=== 4 × 400 metres relay ===
16 August

Rank	Nation	Athletes	Time	Note	Points
1	East Germany	Dagmar Rübsam, Martina Steuk, Bärbel Wockel, Marita Koch	3:19.83		8
2	Soviet Union	Nadezhda Lyalina, Tatyana Litvinova, Irina Baskakova, Irina Nazarova	3:24.85		7
3	Great Britain	Linda Forsyth, Michelle Scutt, Verona Elder, Joslyn Hoyte-Smith	3:27.27		6
4	West Germany	Ute Finger, Gabi Bumaßnn, Birgit Vöcking, Claudia Steger	3:29.50		5
5	Poland	Beata Niedzielska, Jolanta Januchta, Grażyna Oliszewska, Genowefa Błaszak	3:30.60		4
6	Bulgaria	Malena Andonova, Violeta Tsvetkova, Ivanka Venkova, Galina Encheva	3:30.90		3
7	Hungary	Irén Orosz, Judit Forgács, Éva Váczi, Ibolya Petrika	3:31.25		2
8	Yugoslavia	Katica Mataković, Nataša Seliškar, Elizabeta Božinovska, Marija Kozma	3:42.48		1

=== High jump ===
16 August

Rank	Name	Nationality	Result	Notes	Points
1	Ulrike Meyfarth	West Germany	1.94		8
2	Lyudmila Andonova	Bulgaria	1.92		7
3	Yelena Popkova	Soviet Union	1.86		6
4	Ann-Marie Cording	Great Britain	1.86		5
5	Andrea Reichstein	East Germany	1.84		4
6	Elżbieta Krawczuk	Poland	1.84		3
7	Emese Béla	Hungary	1.84		2
8	Stanka Prezelj	Yugoslavia	1.81		1

=== Long jump ===
16 August

Rank	Name	Nationality	#1	#2	#3	#4	#5	#6	Result	Notes	Points
1	Sigrid Ulbricht	East Germany	6.67	6.86	x	x	6.53	x	6.86		8
2	Anna Włodarczyk	Poland	x	6.47	6.66	5.50	6.50	x	6.66		7
3	Tatyana Kolpakova	Soviet Union	6.56	6.59	6.39	x	6.50	4.95	6.59		6
4	Christina Sussiek	West Germany	6.10	6.54	6.45	4.96	6.25	6.39	6.54		5
5	Ivanka Venkova	Bulgaria	5.90	6.39	6.03	6.35	6.20	6.21	6.39		4
6	Sue Hearnshaw	Great Britain	x	6.20	6.31	5.82	6.16	x	6.31		3
7	Zsuzsa Vanyek	Hungary	6.07	6.13	x	5.95	6.20	6.14	6.20		2
8	Snežana Dančetović	Yugoslavia	5.96	5.79	5.93	5.90	6.06	x	6.06		1

=== Shot put ===
16 August

Rank	Name	Nationality	#1	#2	#3	#4	#5	#6	Result	Notes	Points
1	Ilona Slupianek	East Germany	20.14	20.78	21.03	21.12	21.10	20.48	21.12		8
2	Verzhiniya Veselinova	Bulgaria	20.20	20.06	20.77	20.56	20.25	x	20.77		7
3	Nina Isayeva	Soviet Union	18.13	17.74	17.85	18.15	17.99	17.93	18.15		6
4	Viktória Horváth	Hungary	16.77	16.85	17.11	16.88	16.99	16.88	17.11		5
5	Eva Wilms	West Germany	x	16.85	x	x	x	16.65	16.85		4
6	Venissa Head	Great Britain	x	x	16.73	16.52	16.67	x	16.73		3
7	Ludwika Chewińska	Poland	15.93	16.69	16.65	x	16.42	x	16.69		2
8	Mirjana Tufegdžić	Yugoslavia	x	14.92	15.66	14.94	15.54	x	15.66		1

=== Discus throw ===
15 August

Rank	Name	Nationality	#1	#2	#3	#4	#5	#6	Result	Notes	Points
1	Maria Vergova	Bulgaria	65.58	69.08	66.32	67.28	68.08	x	69.08		8
2	Galina Savinkova	Soviet Union	68.46	x	67.88	67.38	65.22	x	68.46		7
3	Evelin Jahl	East Germany	x	66.10	64.80	x	67.32	67.22	67.32		6
4	Ingra Manecke	West Germany	57.14	58.56	60.12	x	56.40	58.64	60.12		5
5	Ágnes Herczegh	Hungary	55.94	54.96	57.56	56.12	x	58.08	58.08		4
6	Danuta Majewska	Poland	53.98	x	54.72	55.58	56.38	53.82	56.38		3
7	Meg Ritchie	Great Britain	x	x	48.90	x	49.08	53.66	53.66		2
8	Snežana Golubić	Yugoslavia	x	x	31.40	42.18	x	x	42.18		1

=== Javelin throw ===
15 August – Old model

Rank	Name	Nationality	#1	#2	#3	#4	#5	#6	Result	Notes	Points
1	Antoaneta Todorova	Bulgaria	65.38	x	71.88	x	64.68	64.06	71.88	WR	8
2	Tessa Sanderson	Great Britain	x	60.80	63.80	65.94	64.42	x	65.94		7
3	Ingrid Thyssen	West Germany	63.86	61.10	x	x	58.42	x	63.86		6
4	Ute Hommola	East Germany	62.06	62.00	60.72	59.30	62.82	49.18	62.82		5
5	Leolita Bļodniece	Soviet Union	60.24	57.32	50.40	x	x	x	60.24		4
6	Mária Janák	Hungary	54.10	54.04	56.98	55.90	56.52	x	56.98		3
7	Maria Jabłońska	Poland	51.06	51.60	54.36	51.26	52.02	51.34	54.36		2
8	Borbala Menyhart	Yugoslavia	50.66	51.78	50.24	52.54	50.68	52.26	52.54		1
