= 1991 World Championships in Athletics – Women's 200 metres =

These are the official results of the Women's 200 metres event at the 1991 IAAF World Championships in Tokyo, Japan. There were a total number of 38 participating athletes, with five qualifying heats and the final held on Friday August 30, 1991.

== Medalists ==
Gold	Katrin Krabbe; Germany (GER)
Silver	Gwen Torrence; United States (USA)
Bronze	Merlene Ottey; Jamaica (JAM)

== Schedule ==
- All times are Japan Standard Time (UTC+9)

Heats
29.08.1991 – 10:40h
Quarterfinals
29.08.1991 – 17:25h
Semifinals
30.08.1991 – 17:00h
Final
30.08.1991 – 19:55h

== Final ==
RANK	FINAL	TIME
	Katrin Krabbe (GER)	22.09
	Gwen Torrence (USA)	22.16
	Merlene Ottey (JAM)	22.21
4.	Irina Privalova (URS)	22.28
5.	Galina Malchugina (URS)	22.66
6.	Dannette Young (USA)	22.87
7.	Pauline Davis (BAH)	22.90
8.	Yelena Vinogradova (URS)	23.10

== Semifinals ==
- Held on Friday 1991-08-30

RANK	HEAT 1	TIME
1.	Katrin Krabbe (GER)	22.30
2.	Dannette Young (USA)	22.69
3.	Pauline Davis (BAH)	22.80
4.	Yelena Vinogradova (URS)	22.83
5.	Esther Jones (USA)	23.22
6.	Julia Duporty (CUB)	23.58
7.	Valérie Jean-Charles (FRA)	23.64
8.	Simmone Jacobs (GBR)	23.72

RANK	HEAT 2	TIME
1.	Gwen Torrence (USA)	22.58
2.	Merlene Ottey (JAM)	22.59
3.	Irina Privalova (URS)	22.70
4.	Galina Malchugina (URS)	22.92
5.	Silke Knoll (GER)	23.49
6.	Maguy Nestoret (FRA)	23.79
7.	Sisko Hanhijoki (FIN)	24.12
8.	Orit Kolodni (ISR)	24.27

== Quarterfinals ==
- Held on Thursday 1991-08-29

RANK	HEAT 1	TIME
1.	Katrin Krabbe (GER)	22.46
2.	Dannette Young (USA)	22.49
3.	Galina Malchugina (URS)	22.49
4.	Valerie Jean-Charles (FRA)	23.23
5.	Orit Kolodni (ISR)	23.61
6.	Mariama Ouiminga (BUR)	25.23
—	Jennifer Stoute (GBR)	DNF
—	Gailey Dube (ZIM)	DNS

RANK	HEAT 2	TIME
1.	Gwen Torrence (USA)	22.52
2.	Pauline Davis (BAH)	22.82
3.	Yelena Vinogradova (URS)	22.82
4.	Sisko Hanhijoki (FIN)	23.17
5.	Simmone Jacobs (GBR)	23.37
6.	Julia Duporty (CUB)	23.46
7.	Wang Huei-Chen (TPE)	23.63
8.	Govindasamy Shanti (MAS)	24.19

RANK	HEAT 3	TIME
1.	Merlene Ottey (JAM)	22.64
2.	Irina Privalova (URS)	22.89
3.	Silke-Beate Knoll (GER)	22.97
4.	Esther Jones (USA)	23.03
5.	Maguy Nestoret (FRA)	23.46
6.	Marisa Masullo (ITA)	23.70
7.	Claudete Alves Pina (BRA)	23.80
8.	Agnes Kozary (HUN)	23.99

== Qualifying heats ==
- Held on Thursday 1991-08-29

RANK	HEAT 1	TIME
1.	Gwen Torrence (USA)	23.09
2.	Valerie Jean-Charles (FRA)	23.13
3.	Pauline Davis (BAH)	23.31
4.	Wang Huei-Chen (TPE)	23.72
5.	Govindasamy Shanti (MAS)	24.09
6.	Rosanna Browne (ANG)	24.80
7.	Deirdre Caruana (MLT)	25.39
–	Mary-Estelle Kapalu (VAN)	DNS

RANK	HEAT 2	TIME
1.	Merlene Ottey (JAM)	23.25
2.	Galina Malchugina (URS)	23.44
3.	Julia Duporty (CUB)	23.71
4.	Mariama Ouiminga (BUR)	25.32
5.	Vaciseva Tavaga (FIJ)	25.48
6.	Denise Ouabangui (CAF)	26.03
7.	Juliana Obiong (GEQ)	28.17

RANK	HEAT 3	TIME
1.	Esther Jones (USA)	23.32
2.	Irina Privalova (URS)	23.39
3.	Claudete Alves Pina (BRA)	23.83
4.	Simmone Jacobs (GBR)	23.87
5.	Agnes Kozary (HUN)	23.99
6.	Jane Thondojee (MRI)	25.46
7.	Jatamsuren Otgonchineg (MGL)	25.48
8.	Feroza Khatton (BAN)	26.14

RANK	HEAT 4	TIME
1.	Dannette Young (USA)	22.77
2.	Yelena Vinogradova (URS)	22.93
3.	Silke-Beate Knoll (GER)	23.09
4.	Maguy Nestoret (FRA)	23.39
5.	Marisa Masullo (ITA)	23.75
6.	Claudia Acerenza (URU)	24.66
7.	Mpoka Mokosi (ZAI)	27.21
8.	Fathimath Fezleen (MDV)	28.30

RANK	HEAT 5	TIME
1.	Sisko Hanhijoki (FIN)	23.12
2.	Jennifer Stoute (GBR)	23.18
3.	Katrin Krabbe (GER)	23.23
4.	Orit Kolodni (ISR)	23.78
5.	Gailey Dube (ZIM)	24.22
6.	Olga Conte (ARG)	24.97
7.	Aminata Konate (GUI)	25.12

== See also ==
- 1987 Women's World Championships 200 metres (Rome)
- 1988 Women's Olympic 200 metres (Seoul)
- 1990 Women's European Championships 200 metres (Split)
- 1992 Women's Olympic 200 metres (Barcelona)
- 1993 Women's World Championships 200 metres (Stuttgart)
