= Herczegh =

Herczegh is a Hungarian surname. Notable people with the surname include:

- Ágnes Herczegh (born 1950), Hungarian discus thrower
- Anita Herczegh, daughter of Géza, wife of János Áder, former First Lady of Hungary
- Géza Herczegh (1928–2010), Hungarian judge

== See also ==
- Herczeg
