= 1992 European Athletics Indoor Championships – Women's 200 metres =

The women's 200 metres event at the 1992 European Athletics Indoor Championships were held at the Palasport di Genova in Genoa, Italy from 29 February-1 March 1992.

== Medalists ==
Gold	Silver	Bronze
Oksana Stepicheva; Unified Team	Iolanda Oanta; Romania	Sabine Tröger; Austria

== Results ==
=== Heats ===
First 3 from each heat (Q) and the next 3 fastest (q) qualified for the semifinals.

Rank	Heat	Name	Nationality	Time	Notes
1	2	Oksana Stepicheva	Unified Team	23.11	Q
2	3	Natalya Voronova	Unified Team	23.50	Q
3	2	Iolanda Oanta	Romania	23.61	Q
4	1	Sanna Hernesniemi	Finland	23.69	Q
5	1	Sabine Tröger	Austria	23.75	Q
6	2	Muriel Leroy	France	23.79	Q
7	3	Tsvetanka Ilieva	Bulgaria	23.80	Q
8	3	Monika Špičková	Czechoslovakia	23.83	Q
9	2	Sølvi Olsen	Norway	23.84	q
10	1	Karin de Lange	Netherlands	23.90	Q
11	2	Regula Anliker-Aebi	Switzerland	23.94	q
12	1	Donatella Dal Bianco	Italy	24.02	q
13	1	Anja Böhme	Germany	24.12	
14	3	Daniela Ferrian	Italy	24.46	
15	1	Cristina Regalo	Portugal	24.68	
15	3	Michelle Carroll	Ireland	24.68	
17	3	Virgínia Gomes	Portugal	24.99	

=== Semifinals ===
First 3 from each semifinal qualified directly (Q) for the final.

Rank	Heat	Name	Nationality	Time	Notes
1	1	Oksana Stepicheva	Unified Team	23.20	Q
2	1	Iolanda Oanta	Romania	23.20	Q
3	2	Natalya Voronova	Unified Team	23.47	Q
4	1	Sabine Tröger	Austria	23.53	Q
5	1	Regula Anliker-Aebi	Switzerland	23.69	
5	2	Tsvetanka Ilieva	Bulgaria	23.69	Q
7	1	Karin de Lange	Netherlands	23.75	
8	2	Sanna Hernesniemi	Finland	23.89	Q
9	2	Sølvi Olsen	Norway	24.16	
10	2	Muriel Leroy	France	24.16	
11	1	Monika Špičková	Czechoslovakia	24.20	
	2	Donatella Dal Bianco	Italy	DNS	

=== Final ===
Rank	Lane	Name	Nationality	Time	Notes
1st place, gold medalist(s)	3	Oksana Stepicheva	Unified Team	23.18	
2nd place, silver medalist(s)	4	Iolanda Oanta	Romania	23.23	
3rd place, bronze medalist(s)	6	Sabine Tröger	Austria	23.35	
4	5	Natalya Voronova	Unified Team	23.38	
5	1	Tsvetanka Ilieva	Bulgaria	23.85	
6	2	Sanna Hernesniemi	Finland	23.97	
