= Athletics at the 1963 Summer Universiade – Women's shot put =

The women's shot put event at the 1963 Summer Universiade was held at the Estádio Olímpico Monumental in Porto Alegre in September 1963.

== Results ==
Rank	Athlete	Nationality	Result	Notes
1st place, gold medalist(s)	Tamara Press	Soviet Union	17.29	
2nd place, silver medalist(s)	Judit Bognár	Hungary	15.47	
3rd place, bronze medalist(s)	Jolán Kleiber-Kontsek	Hungary	14.75	
4	Myriam Yutronic	Chile	11.55	
5	Maria Caldeira	Brazil	10.51	
6	Irene Scheurer Richa	Brazil	10.41	
