= Athletics at the 1989 Summer Universiade – Women's 200 metres =

The women's 200 metres event at the 1989 Summer Universiade was held at the Wedaustadion in Duisburg with the final on 27 and 28 August 1989.

== Medalists ==
Gold	Silver	Bronze
Galina Malchugina; Soviet Union	Liliana Allen; Cuba	Esther Jones; United States

== Results ==
=== Heats ===
Wind:
Heat 1: +0.9 m/s, Heat 2: +0.9 m/s, Heat 3: +0.6 m/s

Rank	Heat	Athlete	Nationality	Time	Notes
1	2	Galina Malchugina	Soviet Union	22.68	Q
2	1	Esther Jones	United States	23.11	Q
3	3	Liliana Allen	Cuba	23.12	Q
4	2	Silke-Beate Knoll	West Germany	23.38	Q
5	1	Sisko Hanhijoki	Finland	23.45	Q
6	2	Rossella Tarolo	Italy	23.46	Q
7	1	Tatyana Papilina	Soviet Union	23.55	Q
8	3	Diane Dixon	United States	23.61	Q
9	2	France Gareau	Canada	23.84	Q
10	3	Magali Seguin	France	23.87	Q
11	3	Sølvi Olsen	Norway	23.99	Q
12	1	Cristiana Picchi	Italy	24.01	Q
13	2	Mona Karin Riisnes	Norway	24.39	Q
14	1	Wang Huei-chen	Chinese Taipei	24.45	Q
15	3	Faith Idehen	Nigeria	24.54	Q
16	2	Stephanie O'Connell	Ireland	24.86	q
17	2	Huang Kuei-ying	Chinese Taipei	25.24	
18	3	Aminata Konate	Guinea	25.78	
19	3	Peninnah Aligawesa	Uganda	27.11	
20	1	Lee Yin King	Hong Kong	27.60	

=== Semifinals ===
Wind:
Heat 1: +2.5 m/s, Heat 2: +1.8 m/s

Rank	Heat	Athlete	Nationality	Time	Notes
1	1	Galina Malchugina	Soviet Union	22.89	Q
2	2	Esther Jones	United States	23.02	Q
3	2	Liliana Allen	Cuba	23.10	Q
4	1	Sisko Hanhijoki	Finland	23.39	Q
5	2	Tatyana Papilina	Soviet Union	23.54	Q
6	1	Diane Dixon	United States	23.59	Q
7	1	Silke-Beate Knoll	West Germany	23.60	q
8	2	Rossella Tarolo	Italy	23.61	q
9	2	Magali Seguin	France	23.81	
10	1	France Gareau	Canada	24.02	
11	2	Sølvi Olsen	Norway	24.04	
12	1	Cristiana Picchi	Italy	24.25	
13	2	Faith Idehen	Nigeria	24.43	
14	1	Mona Karin Riisnes	Norway	24.64	
14	2	Wang Huei-chen	Chinese Taipei	24.64	
16	1	Stephanie O'Connell	Ireland	25.13	

=== Final ===
Wind: +0.3 m/s

Rank	Athlete	Nationality	Time	Notes
1st place, gold medalist(s)	Galina Malchugina	Soviet Union	22.70	
2nd place, silver medalist(s)	Liliana Allen	Cuba	23.00	
3rd place, bronze medalist(s)	Esther Jones	United States	23.02	
4	Sisko Hanhijoki	Finland	23.14	
5	Tatyana Papilina	Soviet Union	23.25	
6	Rossella Tarolo	Italy	23.53	
7	Silke-Beate Knoll	West Germany	23.59	
	Diane Dixon	United States	DNS	
