= 1969 European Indoor Games – Women's shot put =

The women's shot put event at the 1969 European Indoor Games was held on 9 March in Belgrade.

== Results ==
Rank	Name	Nationality	Result	Notes
1st place, gold medalist(s)	Marita Lange	East Germany	17.52	
2nd place, silver medalist(s)	Ivanka Khristova	Bulgaria	16.94	
3rd place, bronze medalist(s)	Ingeburg Friedrich	East Germany	16.42	
4	Judit Bognár	Hungary	15.58	
5	Helena Fibingerová	Czechoslovakia	14.49	
6	Mirjana Bosnić	Yugoslavia	14.22	
7	Liesel Prokop	Austria	12.97	
