= Athletics at the 1975 Summer Universiade – Women's 1500 metres =

The women's 1500 metres event at the 1975 Summer Universiade was held at the Stadio Olimpico in Rome with the final on 20 September.

== Results ==
Rank	Athlete	Nationality	Time	Notes
1st place, gold medalist(s)	Ellen Wellmann	West Germany	4:08.72	
2nd place, silver medalist(s)	Natalia Andrei	Romania	4:08.84	
3rd place, bronze medalist(s)	Rositsa Pekhlivanova	Bulgaria	4:10.17	
4	Thelma Wright	Canada	4:11.45	
5	Margherita Gargano	Italy	4:13.20	
6	Magdolna Lázár	Hungary	4:13.87	
7	Bronisława Ludwichowska	Poland	4:13.95	
8	Raisa Katvukoya	Soviet Union	4:15.32	
9	Borbala Török	Hungary	4:19.35	
10	Svetlana Ulmasova	Soviet Union	4:19.51	
11	Silvana Cruciata	Italy	4:19.58	
12	Maureen Crowley	Canada	4:22.43	
13	Christine Benning	Great Britain	4:22.58	
14	Christine Icéaga	France	4:26.03	
15	Sylvia Schenk	West Germany	4:34.32	
16	Maria da Silva	Brazil	4:55.47	
