= 1990 European Athletics Championships – Women's 200 metres =

Women's 200 metres at the European Athletics Championships

These are the official results of the Women's 200 metres event at the 1990 European Championships in Split, Yugoslavia, held at Stadion Poljud on 29 and 30 August 1990.

== Medalists ==
Gold	Katrin Krabbe; East Germany
Silver	Heike Drechsler; East Germany
Bronze	Galina Malchugina; Soviet Union

== Results ==
=== Final ===
30 August Wind: 0.3 m/s

Rank	Name	Nationality	Time	Notes
1st place, gold medalist(s)	Katrin Krabbe	East Germany	21.95	
2nd place, silver medalist(s)	Heike Drechsler	East Germany	22.19	
3rd place, bronze medalist(s)	Galina Malchugina	Soviet Union	22.23	
4	Sandra Myers	Spain	22.38	NR
5	Silke Knoll	West Germany	22.40	
6	Yelena Bykova	Soviet Union	22.49	
7	Sabine Günther	East Germany	22.51	
8	Andrea Thomas	West Germany	23.01	

=== Semi-finals ===
30 August

==== Semi-final 1 ====
Wind: -0.4 m/s

Rank	Name	Nationality	Time	Notes
1	Katrin Krabbe	East Germany	22.46	Q
2	Silke Knoll	West Germany	22.60	Q
3	Galina Malchugina	Soviet Union	22.62	Q
4	Sandra Myers	Spain	22.69	Q
5	Fabienne Ficher	France	23.39	
6	Sisko Hanhijoki	Finland	23.42	
7	Louise Stuart	United Kingdom	23.54	
8	Marisa Masullo	Italy	23.62	

==== Semi-final 2 ====
Wind: 0.2 m/s

Rank	Name	Nationality	Time	Notes
1	Heike Drechsler	East Germany	22.57	Q
2	Yelena Bykova	Soviet Union	22.67	Q
3	Sabine Günther	East Germany	22.75	Q
4	Andrea Thomas	West Germany	23.05	Q
5	Odile Singa	France	23.23	
6	Jennifer Stoute	United Kingdom	23.23	
7	Rossella Tarolo	Italy	23.56	
8	Lucrécia Jardim	Portugal	23.58	

=== Heats ===
29 August

==== Heat 1 ====
Wind: -0.7 m/s

Rank	Name	Nationality	Time	Notes
1	Katrin Krabbe	East Germany	22.81	Q
2	Andrea Thomas	West Germany	23.21	Q
3	Sisko Hanhijoki	Finland	23.46	Q
4	Marisa Masullo	Italy	23.47	Q
5	Louise Stuart	United Kingdom	23.54	q
6	Maguy Nestoret	France	23.77	
7	Edit Molnár	Hungary	24.11	
	Cristina Castro	Spain	DNS	

==== Heat 2 ====
Wind: -0.5 m/s

Rank	Name	Nationality	Time	Notes
1	Heike Drechsler	East Germany	22.84	Q
2	Yelena Bykova	Soviet Union	23.38	Q
3	Sandra Myers	Spain	23.50	Q
4	Odile Singa	France	23.58	Q
5	Sallyanne Short	United Kingdom	23.83	
6	Andrea Hagen	West Germany	24.01	
7	Joanna Smolarek	Poland	24.51	

==== Heat 3 ====
Wind: 0.2 m/s

Rank	Name	Nationality	Time	Notes
1	Galina Malchugina	Soviet Union	22.56	Q
2	Sabine Günther	East Germany	22.68	Q
3	Silke Knoll	West Germany	22.80	Q
4	Jennifer Stoute	United Kingdom	23.24	Q
5	Fabienne Ficher	France	23.38	q
6	Lucrécia Jardim	Portugal	23.65	q
7	Rossella Tarolo	Italy	23.70	q
8	Ágnes Kozáry	Hungary	24.18	

== Participation ==
According to an unofficial count, 22 athletes from 11 countries participated in the event.

- East Germany (3)
- Finland (1)
- France (3)
- Hungary (2)
- Italy (2)
- Poland (1)
- Portugal (1)
- Soviet Union (2)
- Spain (1)
- United Kingdom (3)
- West Germany (3)

== See also ==
- 1988 Women's Olympic 200 metres (Seoul)
- 1991 Women's World Championships 200 metres (Tokyo)
- 1992 Women's Olympic 200 metres (Barcelona)
