= 1985 European Athletics Indoor Championships – Women's 400 metres =

The women's 400 metres event at the 1985 European Athletics Indoor Championships was held on 2 and 3 March.

== Medalists ==
Gold	Silver	Bronze
Sabine Busch; East Germany	Dagmar Neubauer; East Germany	Alena Bulířová; Czechoslovakia

== Results ==
=== Heats ===
First 2 from each heat (Q) and the next 1 fastest (q) qualified for the final.

Rank	Heat	Name	Nationality	Time	Notes
1	1	Dagmar Neubauer	East Germany	52.50	Q
2	2	Sabine Busch	East Germany	52.92	Q
3	1	Erika Rossi	Italy	53.34	Q
4	2	Alena Bulířová	Czechoslovakia	53.53	Q
5	2	Regine Berg	Belgium	53.80	q
6	1	Blanca Lacambra	Spain	54.34	
7	1	Fabienne Lise	France	54.49	
8	1	Semra Aksu	Turkey	54.54	
9	2	Antonella Ratti	Italy	54.98	
10	2	Patricia Amond	Ireland	56.86	

=== Final ===
Rank	Name	Nationality	Time	Notes
1st place, gold medalist(s)	Sabine Busch	East Germany	51.35	
2nd place, silver medalist(s)	Dagmar Neubauer	East Germany	51.40	
3rd place, bronze medalist(s)	Alena Bulířová	Czechoslovakia	52.54	
4	Erika Rossi	Italy	52.59	
5	Regine Berg	Belgium	53.15	
