= 1990 European Athletics Indoor Championships – Women's 200 metres =

The women's 200 metres event at the 1990 European Athletics Indoor Championships was held in Kelvin Hall on 3 and 4 March.

== Medalists ==
Gold	Silver	Bronze
Ulrike Sarvari; West Germany	Natalya Kovtun; Soviet Union	Galina Malchugina; Soviet Union

== Results ==
=== Heats ===
The winner of each heat (Q) and the next 5 fastest (q) qualified for the semifinals.

Rank	Heat	Name	Nationality	Time	Notes
1	1	Silke Knoll	West Germany	23.24	Q
2	3	Ulrike Sarvari	West Germany	23.27	Q
3	3	Natalya Kovtun	Soviet Union	23.36	q
4	4	Sandra Myers	Spain	23.37	Q
5	2	Galina Malchugina	Soviet Union	23.38	Q
6	5	Regula Anliker	Switzerland	23.40	Q
7	1	Marie-Christine Cazier	France	23.72	q
8	4	Sisko Hanhijoki	Finland	23.78	q
9	1	Monika Špičková	Czechoslovakia	23.86	q
10	2	Cristina Castro	Spain	23.93	q
11	5	Sabine Tröger	Austria	23.94	
12	5	Donatella Dal Bianco	Italy	23.99	
13	2	Jennifer Stoute	Great Britain	24.03	
14	4	Marisa Masullo	Italy	24.12	
15	1	Helen Burkart	Great Britain	24.40	
16	3	Blanca Lacambra	Spain	24.60	
	2	Lucrécia Jardim	Portugal	DNF	

=== Semifinals ===
First 2 from each semifinal (Q) and the next 1 fastest (q) qualified for the final.

Rank	Heat	Name	Nationality	Time	Notes
1	1	Natalya Kovtun	Soviet Union	23.05	Q
2	2	Ulrike Sarvari	West Germany	23.08	Q
3	2	Sandra Myers	Spain	23.15	Q
4	2	Galina Malchugina	Soviet Union	23.16	q
5	1	Silke Knoll	West Germany	23.42	Q
6	1	Regula Anliker	Switzerland	23.57	
7	2	Monika Špičková	Czechoslovakia	23.88	
8	1	Marie-Christine Cazier	France	24.01	
9	2	Sisko Hanhijoki	Finland	24.30	
10	1	Cristina Castro	Spain	24.72	

=== Final ===
Rank	Lane	Name	Nationality	Time	Notes
1st place, gold medalist(s)	3	Ulrike Sarvari	West Germany	22.96	
2nd place, silver medalist(s)	2	Natalya Kovtun	Soviet Union	23.01	
3rd place, bronze medalist(s)	4	Galina Malchugina	Soviet Union	23.04	
4	1	Sandra Myers	Spain	23.08	
5	5	Silke Knoll	West Germany	23.57	
