= Manda Kanouté =

Malian sprinter (born 1963)

Personal information
- Nationality: Malian
- Born: 1 January 1963 (age 62)

Sport
- Sport: Sprinting
- Event: 200 metres

Manda Kanouté (born 1 January 1963) is a Malian sprinter. She competed in the women's 200 metres at the 1992 Summer Olympics.
