= 1989 IAAF World Indoor Championships – Women's 200 metres =

The women's 200 metres event at the 1989 IAAF World Indoor Championships was held at the Budapest Sportcsarnok in Budapest on 4th March 1989.

Merlene Ottey's winning margin was 0.61 seconds which given the discontinuation of this event at these championships after 2004 will remain the only time the women's 200 metres was won by more than 0.6 seconds at these championships.

== Medalists ==
Gold	Silver	Bronze
Merlene Ottey; Jamaica	Grace Jackson; Jamaica	Natalya Kovtun; Soviet Union

== Results ==
=== Heats ===
The first 2 of each heat (Q) and next 6 fastest (q) qualified for the semifinals.

Rank	Heat	Name	Nationality	Time	Notes
1	2	Merlene Ottey	Jamaica	23.27	Q
2	3	Silke-Beate Knoll	West Germany	23.50	Q
3	3	Marie-José Pérec	France	23.73	Q
4	3	Maria Magnólia Figueiredo	Brazil	23.81	q
5	2	Natalya Kovtun	Soviet Union	23.84	Q
6	1	Grace Jackson	Jamaica	23.86	Q
7	1	Alice Jackson	United States	23.97	Q
8	1	Tsvetanka Ilieva	Bulgaria	24.03	q
9	1	Sisko Hanhijoki	Finland	24.04	q
9	2	Sabine Tröger	Austria	24.04	q
11	2	Ágnes Kozáry	Hungary	24.18	q
11	3	Terri Dendy	United States	24.18	q
13	3	Elma Muros	Philippines	25.05	AR
14	3	Orit Kolodni	Israel	25.35	
15	2	Kinah Chikontwe	Zambia	27.32	NR
	1	Claudia Acerenza	Uruguay	DQ	

=== Semifinals ===
First 3 of each semifinal (Q) qualified directly for the final.

Rank	Heat	Name	Nationality	Time	Notes
1	1	Merlene Ottey	Jamaica	22.72	Q
2	2	Grace Jackson	Jamaica	23.05	Q
3	2	Silke-Beate Knoll	West Germany	23.26	Q
4	2	Marie-José Pérec	France	23.36	Q
5	1	Natalya Kovtun	Soviet Union	23.38	Q
6	1	Maria Magnólia Figueiredo	Brazil	23.71	Q, AR
7	1	Terri Dendy	United States	23.75	
8	2	Sisko Hanhijoki	Finland	23.94	
9	1	Tsvetanka Ilieva	Bulgaria	23.98	
10	1	Sabine Tröger	Austria	24.24	
11	2	Ágnes Kozáry	Hungary	24.37	
	2	Alice Jackson	United States	DQ	

=== Final ===
Rank	Lane	Name	Nationality	Time	Notes
1st place, gold medalist(s)	4	Merlene Ottey	Jamaica	22.34	AR
2nd place, silver medalist(s)	6	Grace Jackson	Jamaica	22.95	PB
3rd place, bronze medalist(s)	1	Natalya Kovtun	Soviet Union	23.28	
4	5	Silke-Beate Knoll	West Germany	23.30	
5	3	Maria Magnólia Figueiredo	Brazil	23.83	
6	2	Marie-José Pérec	France	23.99	
