= Irma Könye =

Hungarian sprinter (1954–2025)

Personal information
- Born: 25 March 1954 Zalaegerszeg, Hungary
- Died: 18 September 2025 (aged 71)
- Education: Kindergarten Teacher Training College

Sport
- Sport: Track and field
- Event: Sprints

Irma Könye (25 March 1954 – 18 September 2025) was a Hungarian sprinter.

== Life and career ==
Könye was born in Zalaegerszeg. She attended Kindergarten Teacher Training College, graduating in 1978.

Könye competed in two events at the 1988 European Athletics Indoor Championships, first reaching the semi-final in the 200 metres, and then being knocked out in the heats of the 60 metres. She became Hungarian champion in the 100 metres in 1976, 1985 and 1988 and 200 metres champion in 1975, 1976, 1985 and 1988. Her only national indoor titles came in 1978, in both 60 and 200 metres.

In 2022, Könye was awarded the Lifetime Achievement Award for Coaching by the Hungarian Coaches Association.

== Death ==
Könye died on 18 September 2025, at the age of 71.
