= Natalie Martindale =

Vincentian athletics competitor (born 1977)

Personal information
- Born: 26 April 1977 (age 48)

Sport
- Country: Saint Vincent and the Grenadines
- Sport: Athletics

Natalie Martindale (born 26 April 1977) competed for Saint Vincent and the Grenadines as a sprinter at the 1996 Summer Olympics in Atlanta, United States.

Martindale was aged just 16 when she first competed internationally when entering two sprint races at the 1993 World Championships in Athletics held in Stuttgart. Germany. First up was the 100 metres, where she finished 7th in her heat out of 8 and ran in a time of 12.86 seconds so didn't qualify for the next round. Two days later she ran in the 200 metres and she came 6th in heat, so again didn't qualify for the next round.

Three years later she was chosen to compete at the 1996 Summer Olympics and was entered into the 100 metres. She ran in a time of 12.25 seconds and finished her heat in 8th place and failed to qualify for the next round.
