= Herczeg =

Herczeg is a Hungarian surname. Notable people with the surname include:

- Ágnes Herczeg, Hungarian artist
- András Herczeg (born 1956), Hungarian football manager and player
- Ferenc Herczeg (1863–1954), Hungarian playwright and writer
- István Herczeg (1887–1949), Hungarian gymnast
- Iván Herczeg, Hungarian sprint canoeist
- Miklós Herczeg (born 1974), Hungarian football player
- Tamás Herczeg, Hungarian politician

== See also ==
- Ágnes Herczegh (born 1950), Hungarian discus thrower
- Géza Herczegh, (1928–2010), Hungarian judge
