= 1988 European Athletics Indoor Championships – Women's 200 metres =

The women's 200 metres event at the 1988 European Athletics Indoor Championships was held on 5 and 6 March.

== Medalists ==
Gold	Silver	Bronze
Ewa Kasprzyk; Poland	Tatyana Papilina; Soviet Union	Silke Knoll; West Germany

== Results ==
=== Heats ===
First 2 from each heat (Q) and the next 4 fastest (q) qualified for the semifinals.

Rank	Heat	Name	Nationality	Time	Notes
1	4	Ewa Kasprzyk	Poland	23.10	Q
2	2	Tatyana Papilina	Soviet Union	23.14	Q
3	3	Galina Malchugina	Soviet Union	23.30	Q
4	1	Silke Knoll	West Germany	23.39	Q
5	4	Ingrid Auerswald	East Germany	23.40	Q
6	3	Tsvetanka Ilieva	Bulgaria	23.45	Q
7	2	Marie-José Pérec	France	23.59	Q
8	4	Els Vader	Netherlands	23.68	q
9	1	Regula Aebi	Switzerland	23.75	Q
10	2	Blanca Lacambra	Spain	23.77	q
11	4	Irma Könye	Hungary	23.79	q
12	1	Kornelija Šinković	Yugoslavia	23.84	q
13	2	Andrea Thomas	West Germany	23.87	
14	3	Sisko Hanhijoki	Finland	24.10	
15	2	Tarja Leveelahti	Finland	24.11	
16	3	Marina Skourti	Greece	24.12	
17	3	Lucrécia Jardim	Portugal	24.47	
18	3	Erika Szopori	Hungary	24.52	
19	4	Vivienne McGoldrick	Ireland	24.76	
20	1	Semra Aksu	Turkey	24.95	

=== Semifinals ===
First 3 from each semifinal qualified directly (Q) for the final.

Rank	Heat	Name	Nationality	Time	Notes
1	1	Ewa Kasprzyk	Poland	23.06	Q
2	2	Silke Knoll	West Germany	23.13	Q
3	2	Tatyana Papilina	Soviet Union	23.18	Q
4	1	Ingrid Auerswald	East Germany	23.26	Q
5	1	Galina Malchugina	Soviet Union	23.30	Q
5	2	Tsvetanka Ilieva	Bulgaria	23.30	Q
7	1	Kornelija Šinković	Yugoslavia	23.46	NR
8	2	Irma Könye	Hungary	23.66	
9	2	Blanca Lacambra	Spain	23.79	
10	2	Marie-José Pérec	France	24.26	
	1	Regula Aebi	Switzerland	DQ	
	1	Els Vader	Netherlands	DNS	

=== Final ===
Rank	Name	Nationality	Time	Notes
1st place, gold medalist(s)	Ewa Kasprzyk	Poland	22.69	NR
2nd place, silver medalist(s)	Tatyana Papilina	Soviet Union	22.79	
3rd place, bronze medalist(s)	Silke Knoll	West Germany	23.12	
4	Tsvetanka Ilieva	Bulgaria	23.17	
5	Ingrid Auerswald	East Germany	23.25	
6	Galina Malchugina	Soviet Union	23.42	
