= Prisca Philip =

Barbadian sprinter

Personal information
- Nationality: Barbadian
- Born: 1 March 1968 (age 57)

Sport
- Sport: Sprinting
- Event: 200 metres

Prisca Philip (born 1 March 1968) is a Barbadian sprinter. She competed in the women's 200 metres at the 1992 Summer Olympics.
