= 1989 IAAF World Indoor Championships – Women's 60 metres =

The women's 60 metres event at the 1989 IAAF World Indoor Championships was held at the Budapest Sportcsarnok in Budapest on 3 March.

== Medalists ==
Gold	Silver	Bronze
Nelli Cooman; Netherlands	Gwen Torrence; United States	Merlene Ottey; Jamaica

== Results ==
=== Heats ===
The winner of each heat (Q) and next 7 fastest (q) qualified for the semifinals.

Rank	Heat	Name	Nationality	Time	Notes
1	1	Nelli Cooman	Netherlands	7.17	Q
2	4	Gwen Torrence	United States	7.22	Q
3	3	Nadezhda Roshchupkina	Soviet Union	7.27	Q
4	1	Liliana Allen	Cuba	7.28	q
5	3	Michelle Finn	United States	7.29	q
6	2	Merlene Ottey	Jamaica	7.30	Q
7	4	Ulrike Sarvari	West Germany	7.31	q
7	5	Laurence Bily	France	7.31	Q
9	2	Sisko Hanhijoki	Finland	7.34	q
10	2	Sabine Tröger	Austria	7.39	q
11	3	Eusebia Riquelme	Cuba	7.40	q
12	4	Paraskevi Patoulidou	Greece	7.49	q
13	4	Éva Barati	Hungary	7.50	
14	4	Elma Muros	Philippines	7.54	
15	5	Lalao Ravaonirina	Madagascar	7.55	NR
16	3	Keturah Anderson	Canada	7.59	
17	1	Méryem Oumezdi	Morocco	7.64	NR
18	5	Eva Hargitai	Hungary	7.68	
19	5	Diana Yankey	Ghana	7.79	NR
20	2	Orit Kolodni	Israel	7.80	
21	1	Sibel Dündar	Turkey	7.93	
22	2	Sara Rossini	San Marino	8.18	NR
23	3	Kinah Chikontwe	Zambia	8.38	

=== Semifinals ===
First 3 of each semifinal (Q) qualified directly for the final.

Rank	Heat	Name	Nationality	Time	Notes
1	1	Nelli Cooman	Netherlands	7.09	Q
2	2	Gwen Torrence	United States	7.10	Q, AR
3	2	Merlene Ottey	Jamaica	7.13	Q
4	1	Liliana Allen	Cuba	7.15	Q, NR
5	1	Laurence Bily	France	7.17	Q, NR
6	2	Ulrike Sarvari	West Germany	7.24	Q
7	2	Eusebia Riquelme	Cuba	7.25	PB
8	2	Nadezhda Roshchupkina	Soviet Union	7.27	
9	1	Sisko Hanhijoki	Finland	7.28	
10	1	Michelle Finn	United States	7.30	
11	1	Paraskevi Patoulidou	Greece	7.47	
12	2	Sabine Tröger	Austria	7.57	

=== Final ===
Rank	Lane	Name	Nationality	Time	Notes
1st place, gold medalist(s)	4	Nelli Cooman	Netherlands	7.05	CR
2nd place, silver medalist(s)	3	Gwen Torrence	United States	7.07	AR
3rd place, bronze medalist(s)	5	Merlene Ottey	Jamaica	7.10	=NR
4	2	Liliana Allen	Cuba	7.16	
5	6	Laurence Bily	France	7.19	
6	1	Ulrike Sarvari	West Germany	7.29	
