= Regula Aebi =

Swiss sprinter

Personal information
- Born: 12 November 1965
- Height: 1.70 m (5 ft 7 in)
- Weight: 58 kg (128 lb)

Sport
- Sport: Athletics
- Event(s): 100 m, 200 m
- Club: LV Langenthal
- Coached by: Stephan Anliker

Regula Aebi (married Anliker; born 12 November 1965) is a Swiss sprinter. She represented her country in 200 metres at the 1988 Summer Olympics reaching the semifinals. In addition, she won the silver medal over the same distance at the 1989 European Indoor Championships.

== International competitions ==
Year	Competition	Venue	Position	Event	Notes
Representing Switzerland
1983	European Junior Championships	Schwechat, Austria	16th (sf)	100 m	12.41
1983	European Junior Championships	Schwechat, Austria	12th (sf)	200 m	24.46
1988	European Indoor Championships	Budapest, Hungary	9th (h)	200 m	23.75^{1}
1988	Olympic Games	Seoul, South Korea	16th (sf)	200 m	23.33
1989	European Indoor Championships	The Hague, Netherlands	2nd	200 m	23.38
1990	European Indoor Championships	Glasgow, United Kingdom	6th (sf)	200 m	23.57
1990	European Championships	Split, Yugoslavia	6th	4 × 400 m relay	3:29.94
1992	European Indoor Championships	Genoa, Italy	5th (sf)	200 m	23.69
1994	European Championships	Helsinki, Finland	20th (qf)	100 m	11.68
1994	European Championships	Helsinki, Finland	13th (sf)	200 m	23.50
1994	European Championships	Helsinki, Finland	9th (h)	4 × 100 m relay	44.43
1994	European Championships	Helsinki, Finland	6th	4 × 400 m relay	3:28.78

^{1}Disqualified in the semifinals

== Personal bests ==
Outdoors

- 100 metres – 11.59 (+0.1 m/s, Lausanne 1989)
- 200 metres – 22.88 (-0.4 m/s, Zug 1988)
- 400 metres – 56.70 (Lausanne 1985)

Indoors

- 200 metres – 23.26 (Magglingen 1990)
