= Sisko Hanhijoki =

Finnish sprinter (born 1962)

Personal information
- Born: 25 April 1962 (age 64) Rautalampi, Finland

Sport
- Sport: Track and field
Medal record
Representing Finland
European Indoor Championships
Bronze medal – third place	1989 The Hague	60 m

Reeta Sisko Hanhijoki, (née Markkanen, born 25 April 1962) is a retired Finnish sprinter, who specialized in the 60, 100 and 200 metres. She won a bronze medal at the 1989 European Indoor Championships. Domestically, she won 28 national championship titles in the 60, 100 and 200 metres indoor and outdoor between 1985 and 1993.

== Early career ==
Hanhijoki was born in Rautalampi and represented the club Vesannon Urheilijat. In her early career she competed in the 4 x 100 metres relay at the 1983 World Championships, and in the 100 metres at the 1986 European Championships without reaching the final. She competed at 60 metres and 200 metres at the 1988 European Indoor Championships and the 1989 World Indoor Championships without reaching the final.

== International breakthrough ==
At the 1989 European Indoor Championships she won the bronze medal in the 60 metres behind Nelli Fiere-Cooman and Laurence Bily. She also finished sixth in the 200 metres. At the 1990 European Championships she reached the semi-final of both the 100 metres and semi-final of the 200 metres. At the 1991 World Indoor Championships she finished eighth in the 60 metres and sixth in the 200 metres. At the 1991 World Championships she only reached the quarter-final of the 100 metres and semi-final of the 200 metres. The Finnish team also participated in the relay. At the 1992 Olympic Games she reached the semi-final of both the 100 and 200 metres, but only round one of the 4 x 100 metres relay. She also finished eighth at the 1992 IAAF World Cup. At the 1993 World Indoor Championships she reached the semi-final of both the 60 metres and sixth in the 200 metres. At the 1993 World Championships she competed in the 4 x 100 metres relay.

Hanhijoki became Finnish champion in both 100 and 200 metres in 1985, 1986, 1988, 1989, 1990, 1991 and 1992. She also became Finnish indoor champion in the 60 metres in 1985, 1987, 1988, 1989, 1990, 1991, 1992 and 1993; and in the 200 metres in 1985, 1987, 1988, 1989, 1990 and 1991. The hegemony in Finnish women's sprint was taken over by Sanna Kyllönen, née Hernesniemi.

Hanhijoki's personal best time in the 60 metres (indoor) was 7.20 seconds, achieved in February 1990 in Nice. In the 100 metres she had 11.24 seconds, achieved at the 1991 World Championships; and in the 200 metres she had 22.81 seconds, achieved in July 1991 in Lappeenranta. She also co-holds the Finnish record in the relay.

== International competitions ==
Year	Competition	Venue	Position	Event	Notes
Representing Finland
1983	World Championships	Helsinki, Finland	13th (h)	4x100 m	44.77
1986	European Championships	Stuttgart, West Germany	23rd (h)	100 m	12.01
1986	European Championships	Stuttgart, West Germany	10th (h)	4x100 m	45.27
1987	European Indoor Championships	Liévin, France	13th (h)	60 m	7.47
1987	European Indoor Championships	Liévin, France	6th	200 m	24.55
1988	European Indoor Championships	Budapest, Hungary	16th (h)	60 m	7.44
1988	European Indoor Championships	Budapest, Hungary	14th (h)	200 m	24.10
1989	European Indoor Championships	The Hague, Netherlands	3rd	60 m	7.23
1989	European Indoor Championships	The Hague, Netherlands	6th	200 m	24.04
1989	World Indoor Championships	Budapest, Hungary	9th (sf)	100 m	7.28
1989	World Indoor Championships	Budapest, Hungary	8th (sf)	200 m	23.94
1989	Universiade	Duisburg, West Germany	4th	200 m	23.14
1990	European Indoor Championships	Glasgow, United Kingdom	5th	60 m	7.23
1990	European Indoor Championships	Glasgow, United Kingdom	9th (sf)	200 m	24.30
1990	European Championships	Split, Yugoslavia	9th (sf)	100 m	11.54
1990	European Championships	Split, Yugoslavia	12th (sf)	200 m	23.42
1990	European Championships	Split, Yugoslavia	–	4x100 m	DQ
1991	World Indoor Championships	Seville, Spain	8th	60 m	7.25
1991	World Indoor Championships	Seville, Spain	6th	200 m	24.10
1991	World Championships	Tokyo, Japan	20th (qf)	100 m	11.52
1991	World Championships	Tokyo, Japan	15th (sf)	200 m	24.12
1991	World Championships	Tokyo, Japan	10th (h)	4x100 m	43.73
1992	Olympic Games	Barcelona, Spain	14th (sf)	100 m	11.65
1992	Olympic Games	Barcelona, Spain	15th (sf)	200 m	23.26
1992	Olympic Games	Barcelona, Spain	9th (h)	4x100 m	43.60
1992	World Cup	Havana, Cuba	8th	100 m	11.76^{1}
1993	World Indoor Championships	Toronto, Canada	11th (sf)	60 m	7.34
1993	World Indoor Championships	Toronto, Canada	10th (sf)	200 m	23.84
1993	World Championships	Stuttgart, Germany	7th	4x100 m	43.37

^{1}Representing Europe
