= Sabine Richter =

German sprinter (born 1966)

Medal record

Women's athletics

Representing Germany

World Championships
Bronze medal – third place	1991 Tokyo	4 × 100 m relay

Sabine Richter (born 18 July 1966) is a German former track and field sprinter who competed mainly over 100 metres. She represented her country at the 1988 Summer Olympics and the 1991 World Championships in Athletics, winning a relay bronze medal at the latter.

== Career ==
Born in Frankfurt, Richter began training with Eintracht Frankfurt sports club. After a third-place finish in the 100 m at the 1988 West German Athletics Championships, she was chosen to represent West Germany at the 1988 Summer Olympics. There she reached the quarter-finals of the individual 100 m and placed fourth overall in the 4 × 100 metres relay alongside Ulrike Sarvari, Andrea Thomas and Ute Thimm.

Richter won her first and only national title at the start of 1989, taking the 60 m crown at the West German Indoor Athletics Championships. She gained her selection for the 1989 European Athletics Indoor Championships, where she placed sixth in the 60 m final. Her next appearance was at the 1990 European Athletics Championships, but she failed to get past the 100 m heats. She competed in her hometown for the 1991 European Cup and came away with a silver medal in the relay (the German team coming six hundredths short of the Soviet winners).

Richter placed third in the 100 m behind Katrin Krabbe and Grit Breuer at the German Athletics Championships – the first edition following German reunification. She ran a personal best of 11.39 seconds for the 100 m that year. She was selected for both the individual and relay events at the 1991 World Championships in Athletics. She failed to get past the quarterfinals of the 100 m, but performed well in the relay alongside Breuer, Krabbe and Heike Drechsler with a bronze medal performance of 42.33 seconds.

This proved to be the height of her career and also her last major international appearance for Germany. She later married German hurdler Heiko Buss and worked as an assistant in a biology laboratory.

== Personal bests ==
- 100 metres – 11.39 (1991)
- 60 metres indoor – 7.31 seconds (1989)

== International competitions ==
Year	Competition	Venue	Position	Event	Notes
1988	Olympic Games	Seoul, South Korea	28th (qf)	100 m	11.59
1988	Olympic Games	Seoul, South Korea	4th	4 × 100 m	42.76
1989	European Indoor Championships	The Hague, Netherlands	6th	60 m	7.31
1990	European Championships	Split, Yugoslavia	18th (h)	100 m	11.84
1991	European Cup	Frankfurt, Germany	2nd	4 × 100 m	42.57
1991	World Championships	Tokyo, Japan	24th (qf)	100 m	11.66
1991	World Championships	Tokyo, Japan	3rd	4 × 100 m	42.33

(#) Indicates overall position in qualifying heats (h) or quarter-finals (qf).

== National titles ==
- West German Indoor Athletics Championships
  - 60 metres: 1989
