= Blanca Lacambra =

Spanish sprinter (born 1965)

Personal information
- Born: 28 August 1965 (age 60) San Sebastián, Spain
- Height: 1.65 m (5 ft 5 in)
- Weight: 53 kg (117 lb)

Sport
- Sport: Track and field
- Event(s): 200 m, 400 m
- Club: Federación Cántabra de Atletismo

Blanca Lacambra Sáiz (born 28 August 1965, in San Sebastián) is a retired Spanish sprinter who competed primarily in the 200 and 400 metres. She represented her country at the 1988 Summer Olympics, as well as three consecutive World Championships, starting in 1987. In addition, she won the silver medal at the 1987 European Indoor Championships and multiple medals at the Ibero-American Championships

== Competition record ==
Year	Competition	Venue	Position	Event	Notes
Representing Spain
1983	Ibero-American Championships	Barcelona, Spain	5th	200 m	25.54
1983	Ibero-American Championships	Barcelona, Spain	2nd	4 × 400 m relay	3:41.30
1985	European Indoor Championships	Piraeus, Greece	6th (h)	400 m	54.34
1986	European Indoor Championships	Madrid, Spain	7th (sf)	200 m	24.14
1986	European Championships	Stuttgart, West Germany	17th (h)	400 m	54.51
1986	European Championships	Stuttgart, West Germany	6th	4 × 400 m relay	3:32.51
1986	Ibero-American Championships	Havana, Cuba	2nd	100 m	11.80
1986	Ibero-American Championships	Havana, Cuba	2nd	4 × 400 m relay	3:36.82
1987	European Indoor Championships	Liévin, France	2nd	200 m	23.19
1987	World Indoor Championships	Indianapolis, United States	10th (sf)	200 m	24.44
1987	World Championships	Rome, Italy	23rd (sf)	400 m	54.72
1987	World Championships	Rome, Italy	15th (h)	4 × 400 m relay	3:32.01
1988	European Indoor Championships	Budapest, Hungary	9th (sf)	200 m	23.79
1988	Ibero-American Championships	Mexico City, Mexico	1st	200 m	23.04
1988	Ibero-American Championships	Mexico City, Mexico	3rd	400 m	52.16
1988	Ibero-American Championships	Mexico City, Mexico	2nd	4 × 400 m relay	3:32.54
1988	Olympic Games	Seoul, South Korea	28th (qf)	400 m	53.76
1989	World Cup	Barcelona, Spain	9th	200 m	24.44
1990	European Indoor Championships	Glasgow, United Kingdom	16th (h)	200 m	24.60
1990	European Championships	Split, Yugoslavia	24th (h)	400 m	54.61
1990	European Championships	Split, Yugoslavia	9th (h)	4 × 400 m relay	3:31.76
1990	Ibero-American Championships	Manaus, Brazil	8th (h)	200 m	24.73
1990	Ibero-American Championships	Manaus, Brazil	2nd	400 m	53.40
1990	Ibero-American Championships	Manaus, Brazil	2nd	4 × 100 m relay	45.60
1990	Ibero-American Championships	Manaus, Brazil	2nd	4 × 400 m relay	3:35.2
1991	World Championships	Tokyo, Japan	7th	4 × 400 m relay	3:27.57
1992	Ibero-American Championships	Seville, Spain	2nd	4 × 400 m relay	3:34.22
1993	World Championships	Stuttgart, Germany	12th (h)	4 × 400 m relay	3:38.61

== Personal bests ==
Outdoor

- 100 metres – 11.61 (+1.3 m/s) (Barcelona 1987)
- 200 metres – 23.04 (0.0 m/s) (Mexico City 1988)
- 400 metres – 51.73 (Madrid 1988)

Indoor

- 200 metres – 23.19 (Liévin 1987)
- 400 metres – 54.34 (Piraeus 1985)
