= Athletics at the 1992 Summer Olympics – Women's 200 metres =

Women's 200 metres at the Games of the XXV Olympiad
- Venue: Olympic Stadium
- Dates: 3 August 1992 (heats and quarter-finals); 5 August 1992 (semi-finals); 6 August 1992 (final)
- Competitors: 51 from 40 nations
- Winning time: 21.81

Medalists
1st place, gold medalist(s)		Gwen Torrence; United States
2nd place, silver medalist(s)		Juliet Cuthbert; Jamaica
3rd place, bronze medalist(s)		Merlene Ottey; Jamaica

These are the official results of the women's 200 metres event at the 1992 Summer Olympics in Barcelona, Spain. There were a total number of 52 participating athletes, with seven qualifying heats. The winning margin was 0.21 seconds.

== Medalists ==
Gold	Gwen Torrence; United States
Silver	Juliet Cuthbert; Jamaica
Bronze	Merlene Ottey; Jamaica

== Records ==
These were the standing world and Olympic records (in seconds) prior to the 1992 Summer Olympics.

World record	21.34	(United States) Florence Griffith-Joyner	Seoul (KOR)	September 29, 1988
Olympic record	21.34	(United States) Florence Griffith-Joyner	Seoul (KOR)	September 29, 1988

== Final ==
RANK	FINAL	TIME
	Gwen Torrence (USA)	21.81
	Juliet Cuthbert (JAM)	22.02
	Merlene Ottey (JAM)	22.09
4.	Irina Privalova (EUN)	22.19
5.	Carlette Guidry (USA)	22.30
6.	Grace Jackson (JAM)	22.58
7.	Michelle Finn (USA)	22.61
8.	Galina Malchugina (EUN)	22.63

== Semifinals ==
RANK	HEAT 1	TIME
1.	Merlene Ottey (JAM)	22.12
2.	Carlette Guidry (USA)	22.31
3.	Galina Malchugina (EUN)	22.44
4.	Grace Jackson (JAM)	22.58
5.	Silke Knoll (GER)	22.60
6.	Pauline Davis (BAH)	22.61
7.	Elinda Vorster (RSA)	23.08
8.	Sisko Hanhijoki (FIN)	23.26

RANK	HEAT 2	TIME
1.	Gwen Torrence (USA)	21.72
2.	Juliet Cuthbert (JAM)	21.75
3.	Irina Privalova (EUN)	22.08
4.	Michelle Finn (USA)	22.39
5.	Mary Onyali (NGR)	22.60
6.	Jennifer Stoute (GBR)	23.01
7.	Melinda Gainsford (AUS)	23.03
—	Anelia Nuneva (BUL)	DNS

== Quarterfinals ==
RANK	HEAT 1	TIME
1.	Juliet Cuthbert (JAM)	22.01
2.	Michelle Finn (USA)	22.42
3.	Pauline Davis (BAH)	22.44
4.	Silke Knoll (GER)	22.46
5.	Marina Trandenkova (EUN)	22.50
6.	Wang Huei-Chen (TPE)	22.93
7.	Simmone Jacobs (GBR)	23.61
8.	Valérie Jean-Charles (FRA)	23.64

RANK	HEAT 2	TIME
1.	Gwen Torrence (USA)	22.21
2.	Grace Jackson (JAM)	22.59
3.	Elinda Vorster (RSA)	22.99
4.	Sisko Hanhijoki (FIN)	23.09
5.	Lucrécia Jardim (POR)	23.09
6.	Lalao Robine Ravaonirina (MAD)	23.63
7.	Damayanthi Dharsha (SRI)	23.89
8.	Georgette N'Koma (CMR)	24.06

RANK	HEAT 3	TIME
1.	Galina Malchugina (EUN)	22.22
2.	Carlette Guidry (USA)	22.26
3.	Anelia Nuneva (BUL)	22.62
4.	Jennifer Stoute (GBR)	22.73
5.	Sabine Günther (GER)	23.10
6.	Iolanda Oanță (ROM)	23.75
7.	Karen Clarke (CAN)	23.80
8.	Heather Samuel (ANT)	24.12

RANK	HEAT 4	TIME
1.	Merlene Ottey (JAM)	21.94
2.	Irina Privalova (EUN)	22.45
3.	Mary Onyali (NGR)	22.60
4.	Melinda Gainsford (AUS)	23.03
5.	Andrea Thomas (GER)	23.19
6.	Karin de Lange (NED)	23.41
7.	Sabine Tröger (AUT)	23.41
8.	Ruth Morris (ISV)	24.26

== Heats ==
RANK	HEAT 1	TIME
1.	Mary Onyali (NGR)	23.06
2.	Irina Privalova (EUN)	23.22
3.	Lucrécia Jardim (POR)	23.26
4.	Damayanthi Dharsha (SRI)	23.82
5.	Melissa Moore (AUS)	23.86
6.	Olga Mutanda (CIV)	24.19
7.	Vaciseva Tavaga (FIJ)	25.07

RANK	HEAT 2	TIME
1.	Merlene Ottey (JAM)	22.95
2.	Jennifer Stoute (GBR)	23.15
3.	Sisko Hanhijoki (FIN)	23.27
4.	Wang Huei-Chen (TPE)	23.37
5.	Andrea Thomas (GER)	23.52
6.	Trương Hoàng Mỹ Linh (VIE)	24.45
7.	Zoila Stewart (CRC)	24.64

RANK	HEAT 3	TIME
1.	Juliet Cuthbert (JAM)	22.99
2.	Elinda Vorster (RSA)	23.14
3.	Pauline Davis (BAH)	23.47
4.	Heather Samuel (ANT)	24.09
5.	Maguy Nestoret (FRA)	24.15
6.	Ngozi Mwanamwambwa (ZAM)	24.59
7.	Nednapa Chommuak (THA)	24.76
8.	Deirdre Caruana (MLT)	25.28

RANK	HEAT 4	TIME
1.	Silke Knoll (GER)	22.83
2.	Michelle Finn (USA)	23.00
3.	Karin de Lange (NED)	23.53
4.	Simmone Jacobs (GBR)	23.90
5.	Ágnes Kozáry (HUN)	24.50
6.	Prisca Philip (BAR)	24.56
—	Oumou Sow (GUI)	DNF

RANK	HEAT 5	TIME
1.	Galina Malchugina (EUN)	23.08
2.	Sabine Günther (GER)	23.41
3.	Sabine Tröger (AUT)	23.72
4.	Ruth Morris (ISV)	24.17
5.	Dawnette Douglas (BER)	25.03
6.	Manda Kanouté (MLI)	26.03
—	Chen Zhaojing (CHN)	DQ

RANK	HEAT 6	TIME
1.	Carlette Guidry (USA)	22.99
2.	Melinda Gainsford (AUS)	23.18
3.	Anelia Nuneva (BUL)	23.32
4.	Karen Clarke (CAN)	23.57
5.	Valérie Jean-Charles (FRA)	23.69
6.	Gaily Dube (ZIM)	24.15
7.	Melrose Mansaray (SLE)	24.67
—	Jacqueline Solíz (BOL)	DQ

RANK	HEAT 7	TIME
1.	Gwen Torrence (USA)	22.66
2.	Grace Jackson (JAM)	22.72
3.	Marina Trandenkova (EUN)	22.79
4.	Lalao Robine Ravaonirina (MAD)	23.58
5.	Iolanda Oanță (ROM)	23.83
6.	Georgette N'Koma (CMR)	23.85
7.	Ruth Mangue (GEQ)	27.65

== See also ==
- 1988 Women's Olympic 200 metres (Seoul)
- 1990 Women's European Championships 200 metres (Split)
- 1991 Women's World Championships 200 metres (Tokyo)
- 1993 Women's World Championships 200 metres (Stuttgart)
- 1994 Women's European Championships 200 metres (Helsinki)
