= Silke-Beate Knoll =

German sprinter

Personal information
- Born: 21 February 1967 (age 59) Rottweil, West Germany

Sport
- Sport: Track and field
Medal record
Representing Germany
World Championships
Bronze medal – third place	1995 Gothenburg	4×100 m
European Championships
Gold medal – first place	1994 Helsinki	4×100 m
European Indoor Championships
Silver medal – second place	1994 Paris	200 m
Representing West Germany
European Championships
Silver medal – second place	1990 Split	4×100 m
Summer Universiade
Bronze medal – third place	1989 Duisburg	4x100 m relay
European Indoor Championships
Bronze medal – third place	1988 Budapest	200 m

Silke-Beate Knoll (born 21 February 1967) is a former German track and field athlete and participant in the Olympic Games who had success in the 1980s and 1990s as a sprinter.

Her first success was the 1986 German junior title over 200 metres. As part of the 4 × 200 metres relay team of the SC Eintracht Hamm, she set a world indoor record in 1988.

Her greatest successes were the bronze medal in the 4 × 100 metres relay race at the 1995 World Championships (together with Melanie Paschke, Silke Lichtenhagen and Gabriele Becker) and the gold medal at the 1994 European Championships in the same event (together with Melanie Paschke, Bettina Zipp and Silke Lichtenhagen). She placed fourth in the individual 200 metre sprint.

Knoll was a member of the German national team at many important international meetings until 1996. She entered the 200 metre sprint at the 1988 Olympic Games in Seoul but was eliminated in the semi-final. She won the silver medal at the 1990 European Championships in the 4 × 100 m relay. She came fifth in the 200 metre sprint. At the 1992 Olympic Games she came fourth in the 4 × 100 m relay and reached the semi-final in the 200 metre sprint. Her third entry at the Olympic Games in 1996 was ill-fated; the 4 × 100 m relay team did not manage to carry the baton to the finish line.

Knoll may not have been in the limelight as much as some other athletes, but few can match her 22 German championship titles. She competed for the MTV Celle, from 1987 to 1989 for SC Eintracht Hamm, then for LG Olympia Dortmund. While she was still competing, she was 1.63 metres tall and weighed 52 kilograms. She ended her athletics career in 1997.

== International competitions ==
Year	Competition	Venue	Position	Event	Notes
Representing West Germany
1985	European Junior Championships	Cottbus, East Germany	1st	4 × 400 m	3:32.67
1987	World Championships	Rome, Italy	18th (h)	200 m	23.40
1987	World Championships	Rome, Italy	5th	4 × 100 m	43.20
1988	European Indoor Championships	Budapest, Hungary	12th (sf)	60 m	7.44
1988	European Indoor Championships	Budapest, Hungary	3rd	200 m	23.12
1988	Olympic Games	Seoul, South Korea	19th (qf)	200 m	23.15
1989	World Indoor Championships	Budapest, Hungary	4th	200 m	23.30
1989	Universiade	Duisburg, West Germany	7th	200 m	23.59
1989	Universiade	Duisburg, West Germany	3rd	4 × 100 m	43.85
1990	European Indoor Championships	Glasgow, United Kingdom	5th	200 m	23.57
1990	European Championships	Split, Yugoslavia	5th	200 m	22.40 (+0.3 m/s)
1990	European Championships	Split, Yugoslavia	2nd	4 × 100 m	43.02
1990	European Championships	Split, Yugoslavia	4th	4 × 400 m	3:25.12
Representing Germany
1991	World Championships	Tokyo, Japan	10th (sf)	200 m	23.49
1992	Olympic Games	Barcelona, Spain	9th (sf)	200 m	22.60
1992	Olympic Games	Barcelona, Spain	5th	4 × 100 m	43.12
1993	World Championships	Stuttgart, Germany	15th (sf)	200 m	23.07
1993	World Championships	Stuttgart, Germany	5th	4 × 100 m	42.79
1994	European Indoor Championships	Paris, France	2nd	200 m	22.96
1994	European Championships	Helsinki, Finland	4th	200 m	22.99 (+0.2 m/s)
1994	European Championships	Helsinki, Finland	1st	4 × 100 m	42.90
1994	World Cup	London, United Kingdom	2nd	4 × 100 m	43.22
1995	World Championships	Gothenburg, Sweden	5th	200 m	22.66
1995	World Championships	Gothenburg, Sweden	3rd	4 × 100 m	43.01
1995	World Championships	Gothenburg, Sweden	4th	4 × 400 m	2:26.10
1996	Olympic Games	Atlanta, United States	heats	4 × 100 m	DNF
