= 1971 European Athletics Indoor Championships – Women's 4 × 200 metres relay =

The women's 4 × 200 metres relay event at the 1971 European Athletics Indoor Championships was held on 13 March in Sofia. Each athlete ran one lap of the 200 metres track.

== Results ==
Rank	Nation	Competitors	Time	Notes
1st place, gold medalist(s)	Soviet Union	Marina Nikiforova; Tatyana Kondrasheva; Lyudmila Aksyonova; Natalya Chistyakova	1:37.1	
2nd place, silver medalist(s)	West Germany	Annelie Wilden; Elfgard Schittenhelm; Annegret Kroniger; Christine Tackenberg	1:38.0	
3rd place, bronze medalist(s)	Bulgaria	Ivanka Venkova; Ivanka Koshnicharska; Sofka Kazandzhieva; Monka Bobcheva	1:39.7	
