= 1989 European Athletics Indoor Championships – Women's 200 metres =

The women's 200 metres event was held on February 19, 1989. The 1989 European Athletics Indoor Championships.

== Medalists ==
Gold	Silver	Bronze
Marie-José Pérec; France	Regula Aebi; Switzerland	Sabine Tröger; Austria

== Results ==
=== Heats ===
First 3 from each heat qualified directly (Q) for the final.

Rank	Heat	Name	Nationality	Time	Notes
1	1	Marie-José Pérec	France	23.16	Q
2	1	Jennifer Stoute	Great Britain	23.50	Q
3	2	Regula Aebi	Switzerland	23.71	Q
4	1	Sabine Tröger	Austria	23.76	Q
5	1	Tsvetanka Ilieva	Bulgaria	23.86	
5	2	Tatyana Papilina	Soviet Union	23.86	Q
5	2	Sisko Hanhijoki	Finland	23.86	Q
8	1	Ingrid Verbruggen	Belgium	24.37	
9	2	Maria Fernström	Sweden	24.47	

=== Final ===
Rank	Lane	Name	Nationality	Time	Notes
1st place, gold medalist(s)	5	Marie-José Pérec	France	23.21	
2nd place, silver medalist(s)	4	Regula Aebi	Switzerland	23.38	
3rd place, bronze medalist(s)	6	Sabine Tröger	Austria	23.70	
4	3	Jennifer Stoute	Great Britain	23.79	
5	1	Tatyana Papilina	Soviet Union	23.80	
6	2	Sisko Hanhijoki	Finland	24.04	
