= Sabine Tröger =

Austrian sprinter

Personal information
- Born: 7 June 1967 (age 59) Vienna, Austria

Sport
- Sport: Track and field
Medal record
Representing Austria
European Indoor Championships
Bronze medal – third place	1989 The Hague	200 m
Bronze medal – third place	1992 Genoa	200 m

Sabine Tröger (née Fuchs, born 7 June 1967) is a retired sprinter from Austria. She twice won a bronze medal in the 200 metres at the European Indoor Championships (1989, 1992). She also competed at the 1992 Olympic Games.

Her personal bests are 11.28 secs for 100 metres (1993) and 23.17 secs for 200 metres (1993). She was a member of the quartet that broke the Austrian record in 4 x 100 metres relay with 44.63 seconds in 1994. As of 2016, the record still stands.

== Achievements ==
Year	Competition	Venue	Position	Event	Notes
Representing Austria
1983	European Junior Championships	Schwechat, Austria	17th (h)	100 m	12.16
1983	European Junior Championships	Schwechat, Austria	21st (h)	200 m	24.96
1989	European Indoor Championships	The Hague, Netherlands	7th	60 m	7.35
1989	European Indoor Championships	The Hague, Netherlands	3rd	200 m	23.35
1989	World Indoor Championships	Budapest, Hungary	12th (sf)	60 m	7.57
1989	World Indoor Championships	Budapest, Hungary	10th (sf)	200 m	24.24
1989	Universiade	Duisburg, West Germany	12th (sf)	100 m	11.90
1990	European Indoor Championships	Glasgow, United Kingdom	8th (sf)	60 m	7.31
1990	European Indoor Championships	Glasgow, United Kingdom	11th (h)	200 m	23.94
1992	European Indoor Championships	Genoa, Italy	8th	60 m	7.42
1992	European Indoor Championships	Genoa, Italy	3rd	200 m	23.35
1992	Olympic Games	Barcelona, Spain	29th (qf)	100 m	11.76
1992	Olympic Games	Barcelona, Spain	23rd (qf)	200 m	23.41
1993	World Indoor Championships	Toronto, Canada	13th (sf)	60 m	7.36
1993	World Championships	Stuttgart, Germany	14th (sf)	100 m	11.37
1993	World Championships	Stuttgart, Germany	17th (qf)	200 m	23.17
1994	European Indoor Championships	Paris, France	6th	60 m	7.31
1994	European Championships	Helsinki, Finland	16th (sf)	100 m	11.72 (+0.6 m/s)
1994	European Championships	Helsinki, Finland	22nd (h)	200 m	23.91 (+0.3 m/s)
1994	European Championships	Helsinki, Finland	—	4x100 m relay	DNF
1995	World Indoor Championships	Barcelona, Spain	16th (h)	60 m	7.35
(h) = preliminary heats; (qf) = quarter finals; (sf) = semifinals
