= 1989 European Athletics Indoor Championships – Women's 60 metres =

The women's 60 metres event at the 1989 European Athletics Indoor Championships was held on 18 February.

== Medalists ==
Gold	Silver	Bronze
Nelli Cooman; Netherlands	Laurence Bily; France	Sisko Hanhijoki; Finland

== Results ==
=== Heats ===
First 3 from each heat (Q) and the next 2 fastest (q) qualified for the final.

Rank	Heat	Name	Nationality	Time	Notes
1	2	Nelli Cooman	Netherlands	7.19	Q
2	2	Laurence Bily	France	7.23	Q
3	1	Paula Dunn	Great Britain	7.27	Q
4	1	Sisko Hanhijoki	Finland	7.31	Q
5	1	Nadezhda Roshchupkina	Soviet Union	7.32	Q
6	2	Sabine Richter	West Germany	7.34	Q
7	2	Sabine Tröger	Austria	7.38	q
8	2	Martha Grossenbacher	Switzerland	7.40	q
9	2	Paraskevi Patoulidou	Greece	7.42	
10	1	Ingrid Verbruggen	Belgium	7.45	
11	1	Sonia Vigati	Italy	7.45	
12	1	Edine van Heezik	Netherlands	7.48	
13	2	Sølvi Olsen	Norway	7.57	
14	1	Mette Husbyn	Norway	7.63	
15	2	Gretha Tromp	Netherlands	7.65	

=== Final ===
Rank	Lane	Name	Nationality	Time	Notes
1st place, gold medalist(s)	4	Nelli Cooman	Netherlands	7.15	
2nd place, silver medalist(s)	5	Laurence Bily	France	7.19	
3rd place, bronze medalist(s)	3	Sisko Hanhijoki	Finland	7.23	
4	6	Paula Dunn	Great Britain	7.24	
5	2	Nadezhda Roshchupkina	Soviet Union	7.27	
6	7	Sabine Richter	West Germany	7.31	
7	8	Sabine Tröger	Austria	7.35	
8	1	Martha Grossenbacher	Switzerland	7.42	
