= 1987 European Athletics Indoor Championships – Women's 200 metres =

The women's 200 metres event at the 1987 European Athletics Indoor Championships was held on 22 February.

== Medalists ==
Gold	Silver	Bronze
Kirsten Emmelmann; East Germany	Blanca Lacambra; Spain	Marie-Christine Cazier; France

== Results ==
=== Heats ===
First 2 from each heat (Q) and the next 2 fastest (q) qualified for the final.

Rank	Heat	Name	Nationality	Time	Notes
1	1	Kirsten Emmelmann	East Germany	23.29	Q
2	1	Blanca Lacambra	Spain	23.33	Q, NR
3	1	Martine Cassin	France	24.27	
4	1	Semra Aksu	Turkey	24.44	
5	1	Marina Skourti	Greece	24.78	
	1	Gerda Haas	Austria	DNS	
1	2	Daniela Ferrian	Italy	23.67	Q, NR
2	2	Marie-Christine Cazier	France	23.75	Q
3	2	Sisko Markkanen	Finland	24.26	q
6	2	Maria Fernström	Sweden	23.85	q
8	2	Odile Singa	France	24.42	
	2	Ingrid Verbruggen	Belgium	DQ	
1	3	Maria Fernström	Sweden	23.67	Q
3	3	Martine Cassin	France	23.95	

=== Final ===
Rank	Name	Nationality	Time	Notes
1st place, gold medalist(s)	Kirsten Emmelmann	East Germany	23.10	
2nd place, silver medalist(s)	Blanca Lacambra	Spain	23.19	
3rd place, bronze medalist(s)	Marie-Christine Cazier	France	23.40	
4	Daniela Ferrian	Italy	23.57	
5	Maria Fernström	Sweden	24.50	
6	Sisko Markkanen	Finland	24.55	
