= Zita Bálint =

Hungarian triple jumper

Personal information
- Nationality: Hungarian
- Born: 25 November 1971 (age 54) Budapest, Hungary

Sport
- Sport: Athletics
- Event: Triple jump

Zita Bálint (born 25 November 1971) is a Hungarian athlete. She competed in the women's triple jump at the 1996 Summer Olympics.
