= Mariama Ouiminga =

Burkinabé sprinter

Personal information
- Nationality: Burkinabé
- Born: 24 January 1970 (age 55)

Sport
- Sport: Sprinting
- Event: 100 metres

Mariama Ouiminga (born 24 January 1970) is a Burkinabé sprinter. She competed in the women's 100 metres at the 1988 Summer Olympics. She was the first woman to represent Burkina Faso at the Olympics.
