= Katalin Csőke =

Hungarian discus thrower

Katalin Csőke Tóthné (July 1, 1957 – August 10, 2017) was a female discus thrower, who competed for Hungary at the 1980 Summer Olympics. She was born in Fegyvernek, Jász-Nagykun-Szolnok. She set her personal best (63.20 metres) in 1980.
