= Éva Kürti =

Hungarian athlete

Personal information
- Full name: Éva Kürti
- Nationality: Hungary
- Born: 21 July 1976 (age 49) Debrecen, Hungary
- Height: 1.84 m (6 ft 1/2 in)
- Weight: 88 kg (194 lb)

Sport
- Sport: Athletics, bobsleigh
- Events: Shot put, discus throw
- Club: Nyíregyházi Vasutas SC
- Coached by: László Kerekes

Achievements and titles
- Personal bests: Shot put: 17.60 (2004); Discus throw: 59.05 (2004)

Éva Kürti (born 21 July 1976) is a retired Hungarian bobsledder, shot putter, and discus thrower.

She first competed as a brakewoman, along with her partner lldikó Stréhli, on the Hungarian bobsledding team at the 2002 Winter Olympics, before turning her sights on the shot put and discus throw at the 2004 Summer Olympics, making her one of the few athletes who had competed in both the Summer and Winter Olympic Games.

During her track and field career, Kürti managed to establish her personal bests of 17.60 in shot put and 59.05 in discus throw at the European Grand Prix in Uzhhorod, Ukraine in 2004. Kürti was a member of the track and field squad for Nyíregyházi Vasutas Sport Club in Nyíregyháza, under head coach László Kerekes.

Kürti started her sporting career as part of the Hungarian bobsledding team at the 2002 Winter Olympics in Salt Lake City, where she and her partner Ildikó Strehli placed thirteenth in the two-woman race with a total running time of 1:39.91.

Following a disappointing 2002 Olympic campaign where she failed to win a medal, Kürti turned her focus to track and field, more specifically shot put and discus throw. At the 2004 Summer Olympics in Athens, Kürti qualified to be in the Hungarian squad for her second time in both the women's shot put and discus throw by registering her best throws of 17.60 and 59.05 respectively from the European Grand Prix in Uzhhorod, Ukraine. In the shot put at Olympia, Kürti faded down her stretch to launch a low, 14.60-metre shot on her first and only attempt that put her into the penultimate spot out of thirty-eight athletes. Failing to advance to the shot put final, Kürti had another chance to improve her feat in the discus. She unleashed a 52.52-metre throw in the qualifying round, but her effort was only enough for the thirty-ninth place, and also marked the end of her Olympic run.
