= Karin de Lange =

Dutch sprinter

Personal information
- Nationality: Dutch
- Born: 15 January 1964 (age 61) Arnhem

Sport
- Sport: Sprinting
- Event: 200 metres

Karin de Lange (born 15 January 1964) is a Dutch sprinter. She competed in the women's 200 metres at the 1992 Summer Olympics.
