= Éva Tóth =

Hungarian sprinter

Éva Tóth (12 November 1952 – 30 January 2013) was a Hungarian sprinter who competed in the 1980 Summer Olympics.
