= Ivanka Venkova =

Bulgarian sprinter

Personal information
- Nationality: Bulgarian
- Born: 3 November 1952 (age 73)

Sport
- Sport: Sprinting
- Event: 4 × 100 metres relay
Medal record
Women's athletics
Representing Bulgaria
European Indoor Championships
Bronze medal – third place	1971 Sofia	4×200 m

Ivanka Venkova (born 3 November 1952) is a Bulgarian sprinter. She competed in the women's 4 × 100 metres relay at the 1972 Summer Olympics.
