= Sára Szenteleki-Ligetkuti =

Hungarian middle-distance runner

Personal information
- Nationality: Hungarian
- Born: 20 April 1945 Sárvár, Hungary
- Died: 1 December 2002 (aged 57) Kisrozvágy, Hungary

Sport
- Sport: Middle-distance running
- Event: 1500 metres

Sára Szenteleki-Ligetkuti (20 April 1945 – 1 December 2002) was a Hungarian middle-distance runner. She competed in the women's 1500 metres at the 1972 Summer Olympics.
