= Mária Kiss =

Hungarian sprinter

Personal information
- Nationality: Hungarian
- Born: 26 April 1949 (age 77) Ózd, Hungary

Sport
- Sport: Sprinting
- Event: 100 metres

Mária Kiss (born 26 April 1949) is a Hungarian sprinter. She competed in the women's 100 metres at the 1968 Summer Olympics.
