= Ágnes Kozáry =

Hungarian sprinter

Personal information
- Born: 28 September 1966 (age 59) Zalaegerszeg, Hungary
- Height: 1.74 m (5 ft 9 in)
- Weight: 52 kg (115 lb)

Sport
- Sport: Athletics
- Event(s): 200 m, 400 m
- Club: Zalaegerszegi AC

Ágnes Kozáry (born 28 September 1966 in Zalaegerszeg) is a retired Hungarian sprinter who competed primarily in the 200 metres. She represented her country at the 1992 Summer Olympics as well as one outdoor and one indoor World Championships.

== International competitions ==
Year	Competition	Venue	Position	Event	Notes
Representing Hungary
1989	World Indoor Championships	Budapest, Hungary	11th (sf)	200 m	24.37
1990	European Championships	Split, Yugoslavia	21st (h)	200 m	24.18
1990	European Championships	Split, Yugoslavia	22nd (h)	400 m	54.13
1991	World Championships	Tokyo, Japan	20th (qf)	200 m	23.99
1991	World Championships	Tokyo, Japan	8th	4 × 400 m relay	3:29.07
1992	Olympic Games	Barcelona, Spain	36th (h)	200 m	24.50
1992	Olympic Games	Barcelona, Spain	11th (h)	4 × 400 m relay	3:33.81

== Personal bests ==
Outdoor

- 100 metres – 11.66 (+2.0 m/s, Budapest 1989)
- 200 metres – 23.37 (Zalaegerszeg 1989)
- 400 metres – 53.06 (Nyíregyháza 1989)

Indoor

- 200 metres – 24.04 (Budapest 1989)
- 400 metres – 56.01 (Budapest 1988)
