= Erzsébet Bartos =

Hungarian sprinter

Erzsébet Bartos-Heldt
Personal information
- Nationality: Hungarian
- Born: 31 January 1941 (age 84) Újpest, Hungary

Sport
- Sport: Sprinting
- Event: 100 metres

Erzsébet Bartos (née Heldt; born 31 January 1941) is a former Hungarian sprinter. She competed in the women's 100 metres at the 1964 Summer Olympics.
