= 1993 World Championships in Athletics – Women's 200 metres =

These are the official results of the Women's 200 metres event at the 1993 IAAF World Championships in Stuttgart, Germany. There were a total number of 50 participating athletes, with seven qualifying heats and the final held on Thursday 1993-08-19.

== Final ==
RANK	FINAL	TIME
	Merlene Ottey (JAM)	21.98
	Gwen Torrence (USA)	22.00
	Irina Privalova (RUS)	22.13
4.	Marie-José Pérec (FRA)	22.20
5.	Mary Onyali (NGR)	22.32
6.	Natalya Voronova (RUS)	22.50
7.	Galina Malchugina (RUS)	22.50
8.	Dannette Young (USA)	23.04

== Semifinals ==
- Held on Thursday 1993-08-19

RANK	HEAT 1	TIME
1.	Gwen Torrence (USA)	22.20
2.	Irina Privalova (RUS)	22.20
3.	Natalya Voronova (RUS)	22.35
4.	Marie-José Pérec (FRA)	22.49
5.	Cathy Freeman (AUS)	22.58
6.	Elinda Vorster (RSA)	22.83
7.	Dahlia Duhaney (JAM)	22.97
8.	Petya Pendareva (BUL)	23.06

RANK	HEAT 2	TIME
1.	Merlene Ottey (JAM)	22.12
2.	Galina Malchugina (RUS)	22.22
3.	Mary Onyali (NGR)	22.35
4.	Dannette Young (USA)	22.51
5.	Evette de Klerk (RSA)	22.76
6.	Pauline Davis (BAH)	22.94
7.	Silke Knoll (GER)	23.07
8.	Michelle Finn (USA)	23.26

== Quarterfinals ==
- Held on Tuesday 1993-08-17

RANK	HEAT 1	TIME
1.	Mary Onyali (NGR)	22.74
2.	Irina Privalova (RUS)	22.80
3.	Pauline Davis (BAH)	23.01
4.	Michelle Finn (USA)	23.24
5.	Wang Huei-Chen (TPE)	23.32
6.	Katharine Merry (GBR)	23.46
7.	Yolanda Steyn (RSA)	23.60
8.	Heather Samuel (ATG)	24.32

RANK	HEAT 2	TIME
1.	Merlene Ottey (JAM)	22.81
2.	Evette de Klerk (RSA)	22.88
3.	Natalya Voronova (RUS)	22.94
4.	Silke-Beate Knoll (GER)	23.04
5.	Sabine Troger (AUT)	23.17
6.	Sanna Hernesniemi (FIN)	23.24
7.	Georgette Nkoma (CMR)	23.66
8.	Jennifer Stoute (GBR)	23.95

RANK	HEAT 3	TIME
1.	Marie-José Pérec (FRA)	22.73
2.	Gwen Torrence (USA)	22.87
3.	Elinda Vorster (RSA)	22.94
4.	Dahlia Duhaney (JAM)	23.11
5.	Lucrecia Jardim (POR)	23.16
6.	Stacey Bowen (CAN)	23.62
7.	Yana Burtasenkova (MDA)	23.99
8.	Hermin Joseph (DMA)	24.13

RANK	HEAT 4	TIME
1.	Galina Malchugina (RUS)	22.51
2.	Cathy Freeman (AUS)	22.80
3.	Dannette Young (USA)	22.92
4.	Petya Pendareva (BUL)	23.07
5.	Maya Azarashvili (GEO)	23.33
6.	Jacqueline Poelman (NED)	23.64
7.	Philomena Mensah (GHA)	24.05
–	Dora Kyriakou (CYP)	DNS

== Qualifying heats ==
- Held on Tuesday 1993-08-17

RANK	HEAT 1	TIME
1.	Merlene Ottey (JAM)	23.39
2.	Katharine Merry (GBR)	23.49
3.	Yolanda Steyn (RSA)	23.80
4.	Yana Burtasenkova (MDA)	23.94
5.	Lusia Puleanga (TGA)	26.40
6.	Nve Ruth Mangue (GEQ)	28.89
–	Lydia De Vega (PHI)	DNS

RANK	HEAT 2	TIME
1.	Galina Malchugina (RUS)	22.94
2.	Cathy Freeman (AUS)	23.28
3.	Elinda Vorster (RSA)	23.43
4.	Stacey Bowen (CAN)	23.66
5.	Hermin Joseph (DMA)	24.29
6.	Deirdre Caruana (MLT)	25.96
7.	Thi Tuyet Mai Nguyen (VIE)	26.55

RANK	HEAT 3	TIME
1.	Silke-Beate Knoll (GER)	23.21
2.	Sabine Troger (AUT)	23.66
3.	Sanna Hernesniemi (FIN)	23.69
4.	Georgette Nkoma (CMR)	23.97
5.	Guilhermina da Cruz (ANG)	25.16
6.	Natalie Martindale (LCA)	26.77
–	Melinda Gainsford (AUS)	DNS

RANK	HEAT 4	TIME
1.	Lucrecia Jardim (POR)	23.45
2.	Natalya Voronova (RUS)	23.45
3.	Gwen Torrence (USA)	23.46
4.	Jacqueline Poelman (NED)	23.53
5.	Jennifer Stoute (GBR)	23.83
6.	Mirna El-Laz (LIB)	26.97
7.	Yaznee Nasheeda (MDV)	30.24

RANK	HEAT 5	TIME
1.	Marie-José Pérec (FRA)	23.04
2.	Dahlia Duhaney (JAM)	23.29
3.	Dannette Young (USA)	23.43
4.	Philomena Mensah (GHA)	23.67
5.	Heather Samuel (ATG)	24.01
6.	Rita Pattipeilohy (INA)	25.59
–	Mpoka Mokosi (ZAI)	DNS

RANK	HEAT 6	TIME
1.	Mary Onyali (NGR)	23.21
2.	Petya Pendareva (BUL)	23.39
3.	Michelle Finn (USA)	23.83
4.	Pauline Davis (BAH)	24.10
5.	Dora Kyriakou (CYP)	24.47
6.	Oumou Sow (GUI)	25.81
7.	Melvina Wulah (LBR)	26.11
8.	Shabana Akhtar (PAK)	26.39

RANK	HEAT 7	TIME
1.	Wang Huei-Chen (TPE)	23.30
2.	Irina Privalova (RUS)	23.39
3.	Evette de Klerk (RSA)	23.43
4.	Maya Azarashvili (GEO)	23.68
5.	Nadjina Kaltouma (CHA)	26.15
6.	Lasnet Nkouka (CGO)	26.64
–	Zhanna Pintusevich (UKR)	DNS

== See also ==
- 1992 Women's Olympic 200 metres
