= Irén Orosz-Árva =

Hungarian sprinter

Personal information
- Nationality: Hungarian
- Born: 29 March 1951 (age 74)

Sport
- Sport: Sprinting
- Event: 200 metres

Irén Orosz-Árva (born 29 March 1951) is a Hungarian sprinter. She competed in the women's 200 metres at the 1980 Summer Olympics.
