= Aminata Konaté (sprinter) =

Guinean sprinter

Personal information
- Nationality: Guinean
- Born: 29 December 1968 (age 57)

Sport
- Sport: Sprinting
- Event: 100 metres

Aminata Konaté (born 29 December 1968) is a Guinean sprinter. She competed in the women's 100 metres at the 1992 Summer Olympics. She was the first woman to represent Guinea at the Olympics.
