= Mária Janák =

Hungarian javelin thrower (born 1958)

Mária Janák (born 8 February 1958 in Baja, Bács-Kiskun) is a former javelin thrower from Hungary, who set her personal best in 1982, throwing 62.10 metres. She competed for her country at the 1980 Summer Olympics in Moscow, finishing 13th place (57.80 metres) in the overall-rankings.
