= Emese Béla =

Hungarian high jumper

Emese Béla (born 27 November 1958) is a retired Hungarian high jumper. Her personal best jump was 1.93 metres, achieved in August 1982 in Debrecen. She became Hungarian champion in 1981 and 1983.

== Achievements ==
Year	Competition	Venue	Position	Event	Notes
Representing Hungary
1981	European Indoor Championships	Grenoble, France	6th	High jump	
1983	European Indoor Championships	Budapest, Hungary	4th	High jump	
