= Ibolya Petrika =

Hungarian sprinter (born 1957)

Personal information
- Born: 27 May 1957 (age 69) Nyíregyháza, Hungary

Sport
- Sport: Track and field

Ibolya Petrika (born 27 May 1957) is a Hungarian former sprinter who competed in the 1980 Summer Olympics.
