= Edit Molnár =

Hungarian sprinter

Personal information
- Nationality: Hungarian
- Born: 12 September 1965 (age 60) Sajószentpéter, Hungary

Sport
- Sport: Sprinting
- Event: 4 × 400 metres relay

Edit Molnár (born 12 September 1965) is a Hungarian sprinter. She competed in the women's 4 × 400 metres relay at the 1992 Summer Olympics.
