= Magdolna Lázár =

Hungarian middle-distance runner

Personal information
- Nationality: Hungarian
- Born: 5 May 1951 (age 75) Hajdúböszörmény, Hungary

Sport
- Sport: Middle-distance running
- Event: 800 metres

Magdolna Lázár (born 5 May 1951) is a Hungarian middle-distance runner. She competed in the women's 800 Meters at the 1976 Summer Olympics. She was the 2 time national champion of Hungary and she placed 8 times in the Top 10 in her career.
