= Judit Bognár =

Hungarian shot putter (1939–2011)

Personal information
- Nationality: Hungarian
- Born: 28 January 1939 Székesfehérvár, Hungary
- Died: 26 November 2011 (aged 72) Budapest, Hungary

Sport
- Sport: Athletics
- Event: Shot put
Medal record
Representing Hungary
Summer Universiade
Silver medal – second place	1963 Porto Alegre	Shot put
Bronze medal – third place	1963 Porto Alegre	Discus throw
Bronze medal – third place	1965 Budapest	Shot put

Judit Bognár (28 January 1939 – 26 November 2011) was a Hungarian athlete. She competed in the women's shot put at the 1964, 1968 and the 1972 Summer Olympics.
