= Ágnes Herczegh =

Hungarian discus thrower

Ágnes Herczegh (born 28 August 1950 in Csorna, Győr-Moson-Sopron) is a retired female discus thrower, who competed for Hungary at the 1980 Summer Olympics. She set her personal best (65.22 metres) in 1982.
