= Athletics at the 1984 Summer Olympics – Men's 4 × 100 metres relay =

Men's 4 × 100 metres relay at the Games of the XXIII Olympiad
- Venue: Los Angeles Memorial Coliseum
- Dates: August 10, 1984 (round 1); August 11, 1984 (semifinals & final)
- Competitors: 85 from 20 nations
- Winning time: 37.83 WR

Medalists
1st place, gold medalist(s)		Ron Brown, Sam Graddy, Carl Lewis, Calvin Smith	United States
2nd place, silver medalist(s)		Al Lawrence, Greg Meghoo, Don Quarrie, Ray Stewart, Norman Edwards* * only competed in the preliminary heats.	Jamaica
3rd place, bronze medalist(s)		Sterling Hinds, Ben Johnson, Tony Sharpe, Desai Williams	Canada

Official Video Highlights

The 4 × 100 metres relay races at the 1984 Summer Olympics was contested as part of the athletics program.

== Abbreviations ==
Q	automatic qualification
q	qualification by rank
DNS	did not start
NM	no mark
OR	olympic record
WR	world record
AR	area record
NR	national record
PB	personal best
SB	season best

== Records ==
These were the standing world and Olympic records (in seconds) prior to the 1984 Summer Olympics.

World record	37.86	(United States) Carl Lewis (United States) Calvin Smith (United States) Willie Gault (United States) Emmit King	Helsinki (FIN)	August 10, 1983
Olympic record	38.19	(United States) Larry Black (United States) Robert Taylor (United States) Gerald Tinker (United States) Eddie Hart	Munich (FRG)	September 10, 1972

The United States set a new world record in the final.

== Results ==
=== Final ===
Rank	Lane	Team	Name	Result	Notes
1st place, gold medalist(s)	5	United States	Sam Graddy, Ron Brown, Calvin Smith, Carl Lewis	37.83	WR
2nd place, silver medalist(s)	1	Jamaica	Albert Lawrence, Greg Meghoo, Don Quarrie, Ray Stewart	38.62	
3rd place, bronze medalist(s)	6	Canada	Ben Johnson, Tony Sharpe, Desai Williams, Sterling Hinds	38.70	
4	3	Italy	Antonio Ullo, Giovanni Bongiorni, Stefano Tilli, Pietro Mennea	38.87	
5	2	West Germany	Jürgen Koffler, Peter Klein, Jürgen Evers, Ralf Lübke	38.99	
6	7	France	Antoine Richard, Jean-Jacques Boussemart, Marc Gasparoni, Bruno Marie-Rose	39.10	
7	4	Great Britain	Daley Thompson, Donovan Reid, Mike McFarlane, Allan Wells	39.13	
8	8	Brazil	Arnaldo da Silva, Nelson Rocha Santos, Katsuiko Nakaia, Paulo Correia	39.40	

=== Semi-final ===
Heat 1

Rank	Team	Name	Result	Notes
1	United States	Sam Graddy, Ron Brown, Calvin Smith, Carl Lewis	38.44	
2	Italy	Antonio Ullo, Giovanni Bongiorni, Stefano Tilli, Pietro Mennea	39.32	
3	Canada	Ben Johnson, Tony Sharpe, Desai Williams, Sterling Hinds	39.39	
4	Brazil	Arnaldo da Silva, Nelson Rocha Santos, Katsuiko Nakaia, Paulo Correia	39.52	
5	Ghana	Philip Attipoe, Makarios Djan, Collins Mensah, Rex Brobby	40.19	
6	Indonesia	Johannes Kardiono, Purnomo, Christian Nenepath, Ernawan Witarsa	40.37	
7	Senegal	Mamadou Sene, Hamidou Diawara, Ibrahima Fall, Charles-Louis Seck	40.63	
8	Thailand	Vichan Choocherd, Rangsam Intharachai, Prasit Boonprasert, Sumet Promna	40.83	

Heat 2

Rank	Team	Name	Result	Notes
1	Jamaica	Albert Lawrence, Greg Meghoo, Don Quarrie, Ray Stewart	38.67	
2	Great Britain	Daley Thompson, Donovan Reid, Mike McFarlane, Allan Wells	38.67	
3	West Germany	Jürgen Koffler, Peter Klein, Jürgen Evers, Ralf Lübke	38.70	
4	France	Antoine Richard, Jean-Jacques Boussemart, Marc Gasparoni, Bruno Marie-Rose	38.91	
5	Nigeria	Iziaq Adeyanju, Eseme Ikpoto, Samson Oyeledun, Chidi Imoh	38.98	
6	Antigua and Barbuda	Anthony Henry, Lester Benjamin, Alfred Browne, Larry Miller	40.14	
7	Barbados	John Mayers, Hamil Grimes, Clyde Edwards, Anthony Jones	40.18	
8	Qatar	Waheed Khamis Al-Salem, Faraj Abdulla, Jamal Al-Abdulla, Talal Mansour	40.43	

=== Heats ===
Heat 1

Rank	Team	Name	Result	Notes
1	United States	Sam Graddy, Ron Brown, Calvin Smith, Carl Lewis	38.89	
2	West Germany	Christian Zirkelbach, Peter Klein, Jürgen Evers, Ralf Lübke	39.04	
3	France	Antoine Richard, Jean-Jacques Boussemart, Marc Gasparoni, Bruno Marie-Rose	40.04	
4	Senegal	Mamadou Sène, Hamidou Diawara, Saliou Seck, Charles-Louis Seck	40.15	
5	Thailand	Vichan Choocherd, Rangsam Intharachai, Prasit Boonprasert, Sumet Promna	40.58	
6	Qatar	Waheed Khamis Al-Salem, Faraj Abdulla, Jamal Al-Abdulla, Talal Mansour	40.60	
7	The Gambia	Bakary Jarju, Dawda Jallow, Abdurahman Jallow, Omar Fye	40.73	

Heat 2

Rank	Team	Name	Result	Notes
1	Canada	Ben Johnson, Tony Sharpe, Desai Williams, Sterling Hinds	39.20	
2	Brazil	Arnaldo da Silva, Robson da Silva, Katsuiko Nakaia, Paulo Correia	39.27	
3	Italy	Antonio Ullo, Giovanni Bongiorni, Stefano Tilli, Pietro Mennea	39.87	
4	Nigeria	Iziaq Adeyanju, Eseme Ikpoto, Lawrence Adegbeingbe, Chidi Imoh	39.94	
5	Ghana	Philip Attipoe, Makarios Djan, Collins Mensah, Rex Brobby	40.20	
6	Sierra Leone	Abdul Mansaray, David Peter Sawyerr, Felix Sandy, Ivan Benjamin	40.77	

Heat 3

Rank	Team	Name	Result	Notes
1	Jamaica	Norman Edwards, Greg Meghoo, Don Quarrie, Al Lawrence	38.93	
2	Great Britain	Daley Thompson, Donovan Reid, Mike McFarlane, Allan Wells	39.00	
3	Indonesia	Johannes Kardiono, Mohamed Purnomo, Christian Nenepath, Ernawan Witarsa	40.43	
4	Barbados	John Mayers, Hamil Grimes, Clyde Edwards, Anthony Jones	40.47	
5	Antigua and Barbuda	Anthony Henry, Lester Benjamin, Alfred Browne, Larry Miller	40.70	
6	Republic of the Congo	Théophile Nkounkou, Henri Nding, Antoine Kiakouama, Jean-Didace Bemou	40.74	
7	Liberia	Wallace Obey, Hassan Tall, Oliver Daniels, Augustus Moulton	42.05	
