= Athletics at the 1984 Summer Olympics – Men's 200 metres =

Men's 200 metres at the Games of the XXIII Olympiad
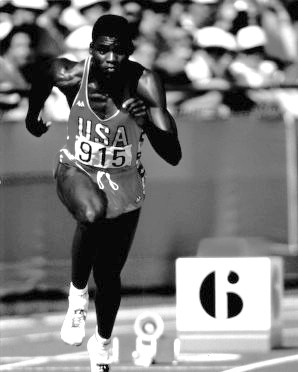
- Carl Lewis
- Venue: Los Angeles Memorial Coliseum
- Dates: 6 August 1984 (heats and quarterfinals); 8 August 1984 (semifinals and finals)
- Competitors: 76 from 58 nations
- Winning time: 19.80 OR

Medalists
1st place, gold medalist(s)		Carl Lewis; United States
2nd place, silver medalist(s)		Kirk Baptiste; United States
3rd place, bronze medalist(s)		Thomas Jefferson; United States

The men's 200 metres at the 1984 Summer Olympics in Los Angeles, United States had an entry list of 76 competitors from 58 nations, with ten qualifying heats (76), four quarterfinals (32), and two semifinals (16) before the final (8) took off on Wednesday August 8, 1984. The maximum number of athletes per nation had been set at 3 since the 1930 Olympic Congress. The event was won by 0.16 seconds by Carl Lewis of the United States (clocking the then-third fastest time in history), the nation's first victory in the men's 200 metres since 1968 and 13th overall. It was the third gold medal of the Games for Lewis, who was attempting to match Jesse Owens in winning the 100, 200, long jump, and 4x100 relay; his victory in this event left only the relay to go, in which the United States was heavily favored. The American team competed in a medal sweep in this event, the first since 1956 and the fifth overall for the United States, with Kirk Baptiste earning silver and Thomas Jefferson taking bronze.

== Background ==
This was the 19th appearance of the event, which was not held at the first Olympics in 1896 but has been on the program ever since. Two of the eight finalists from the 1980 Games returned: gold medalist (and 1972 bronze medalist and 1976 finalist) Pietro Mennea of Italy and bronze medalist (and 1976 gold medalist) Don Quarrie of Jamaica. The favorite was Carl Lewis of the United States, attempting to win four golds, with his teammates Kirk Baptiste and Thomas Jefferson his biggest challengers. The Soviet-led boycott had little effect on this event, with none of the top 200 metres runners in 1984 being from boycotting nations.

Algeria, Bangladesh, the British Virgin Islands, the People's Republic of China, Costa Rica, Equatorial Guinea, The Gambia, Indonesia, Mali, Mauritius, the Netherlands Antilles, Oman, Qatar, Swaziland, and Zimbabwe each made their debut in the event. The United States made its 18th appearance, most of any nation, having missed only the boycotted 1980 Games.

== Competition format ==
The competition used the four round format introduced in 1920: heats, quarterfinals, semifinals, and a final. The "fastest loser" system introduced in 1960 was used in the heats.

There were 10 heats of 8 runners each (before withdrawals), with the top 3 men in each advancing to the quarterfinals along with the next 2 fastest overall. The quarterfinals consisted of 4 heats of 8 athletes each (again, before withdrawals); the 4 fastest men in each heat advanced to the semifinals. There were 2 semifinals, each with 8 runners. Again, the top 4 athletes advanced. The final had 8 runners. The races were run on a 400-metre track.

== Records ==
These were the standing world and Olympic records (in seconds) prior to the 1984 Summer Olympics.

World record	Pietro Mennea (ITA)	19.72	Mexico City, Mexico	12 September 1979
Olympic record	Tommie Smith (USA)	19.83	Mexico City, Mexico	16 October 1968

In the final Carl Lewis set a new Olympic record with 19.80 seconds.

== Schedule ==
All times are Pacific Daylight Time (UTC-7)

Date	Time	Round
Monday, 6 August 1984	10:00; 12:00	Heats; Quarterfinals
Wednesday, 8 August 1984	16:00; 18:30	Semifinals; Final

== Results ==
=== Heats ===
==== Heat 1 ====
Rank	Athlete	Nation	Time	Notes
1	Pietro Mennea	Italy	20.70	Q
2	Peter Van Miltenburg	Australia	21.06	Q
3	Robson Caetano	Brazil	21.08	Q
4	Georges Kablan Degnan	Ivory Coast	21.39	
5	Earl Haley	Guyana	21.52	
6	Inoke Bainimoli	Fiji	22.16	
7	Saidur Rahman Dawn	Bangladesh	22.59	
—	Emmanuel Bitanga	Cameroon	DNF	

==== Heat 2 ====
Rank	Athlete	Nation	Time	Notes
1	Leroy Reid	Jamaica	20.62	Q
2	Ralf Lübke	West Germany	20.88	Q
3	Luke Watson	Great Britain	21.26	Q
4	Yu Zhuanghui	China	21.48	
5	Nordin Mohamed Jadi	Malaysia	21.88	
6	Gregory Simons	Bermuda	21.88	
7	James Idun	Ghana	22.55	
8	Glen Abrahams	Costa Rica	22.75	

==== Heat 3 ====
Rank	Athlete	Nation	Time	Notes
1	Carlo Simionato	Italy	21.06	Q
2	Dudley Parker	Bahamas	21.12	Q
3	Jürgen Evers	West Germany	21.12	Q
4	Florencio Aguilar	Panama	21.50	
5	Sheikh Omar Faye	The Gambia	21.56	
6	Mohammad Mansha	Pakistan	22.04	
7	Christian Nenepath	Indonesia	22.20	
8	Clifford Sibusiso Mamba	Swaziland	22.76	

==== Heat 4 ====
Rank	Athlete	Nation	Time	Notes
1	Thomas Jefferson	United States	20.63	Q
2	Desai Williams	Canada	20.70	Q
3	João Batista da Silva	Brazil	20.70	Q
4	Jamal Al-Abdullah	Qatar	21.10	q
5	Paul Narracott	Australia	21.20	
6	Larry Miller	Antigua and Barbuda	21.93	
7	Markus Büchel	Liechtenstein	22.14	
8	Augustus Moulton	Liberia	22.94	

==== Heat 5 ====
Rank	Athlete	Nation	Time	Notes
1	Patrick Barré	France	20.88	Q
2	Fred Martin	Australia	20.98	Q
3	Gus Young	Jamaica	21.14	Q
4	Alfred Nyambane	Kenya	21.35	
5	Hiroki Fuwa	Japan	21.37	
6	Henry Ngolwe	Zambia	21.58	
7	Antoine Kiakouama	Republic of the Congo	21.64	
8	Odiya Silweya	Malawi	22.46	

==== Heat 6 ====
Rank	Athlete	Nation	Time	Notes
1	Don Quarrie	Jamaica	20.84	Q
2	Ade Mafe	Great Britain	21.24	Q
3	Tony Sharpe	Canada	21.31	Q
4	Sumet Promna	Thailand	21.53	
5	Lindel Hodge	British Virgin Islands	22.28	
6	Mohamed Al-Hashimi	Oman	22.83	
7	Aldo Salandra	El Salvador	22.90	
8	Jean-Yves Mallat	Lebanon	22.91	

==== Heat 7 ====
Rank	Athlete	Nation	Time	Notes
1	Carl Lewis	United States	21.02	Q
2	Atlee Mahorn	Canada	21.42	Q
3	Julien Thode	Netherlands Antilles	21.62	Q
4	Manuel Ramírez	Colombia	21.71	
5	Henrique Ferreira	Mozambique	21.87	
6	Luís Barroso	Portugal	22.03	
7	Christopher Madzokere	Zimbabwe	22.75	
—	Kgosiemang Khumoyarano	Botswana	DNS	

==== Heat 8 ====
Rank	Athlete	Nation	Time	Notes
1	Kirk Baptiste	United States	20.63	Q
2	Luis Morales	Puerto Rico	21.05	Q
3	Neville Hodge	Virgin Islands	21.12	Q
4	Ali Bakhta	Algeria	21.15	q
5	Arnaldo da Silva	Brazil	21.24	
6	Lapule Tamean	Papua New Guinea	21.97	
7	Gustavo Envela	Equatorial Guinea	22.14	
8	Emilio Samayoa	Guatemala	22.19	

==== Heat 9 ====
Rank	Athlete	Nation	Time	Notes
1	Stefano Tilli	Italy	20.72	Q
2	Jean-Jacques Boussemart	France	20.82	Q
3	Mohamed Purnomo	Indonesia	21.01	Q
4	David Sawyerr	Sierra Leone	21.29	
5	Ivan Benjamin	Sierra Leone	21.54	
6	Moussa Savadogo	Mali	21.72	
7	Denis Rose	Seychelles	21.87	
—	Hasely Crawford	Trinidad and Tobago	DNS	

==== Heat 10 ====
Rank	Athlete	Nation	Time	Notes
1	Jang Jae-Geun	South Korea	21.32	Q
2	John Goville	Uganda	21.59	Q
3	John Mayers	Barbados	21.70	Q
4	Nelson Erazo	Puerto Rico	21.72	
5	Damel Flowers	Belize	21.72	
6	Daniel André	Mauritius	22.16	
—	Allan Wells	Great Britain	DNS	
—	Christian Haas	West Germany	DNS	

=== Quarterfinals ===
==== Quarterfinal 1 ====
Rank	Athlete	Nation	Time	Notes
1	Carl Lewis	United States	20.48	Q
2	Stefano Tilli	Italy	20.64	Q
3	Atlee Mahorn	Canada	20.69	Q
4	Luis Morales	Puerto Rico	20.82	Q
5	Mohamed Purnomo	Indonesia	20.93	
6	Patrick Barré	France	20.95	
7	Dudley Parker	Bahamas	21.10	
8	Ali Bakhta	Algeria	21.35	

==== Quarterfinal 2 ====
Rank	Athlete	Nation	Time	Notes
1	Desai Williams	Canada	20.40	Q
2	Pietro Mennea	Italy	20.50	Q
3	Ade Mafe	Great Britain	20.55	Q
4	João Batista da Silva	Brazil	20.61	Q
5	Jürgen Evers	West Germany	20.95	
6	Jang Jae-Keun	South Korea	20.14	
7	John Mayers	Barbados	21.46	
—	Leroy Reid	Jamaica	DNF	

==== Quarterfinal 3 ====
Rank	Athlete	Nation	Time	Notes
1	Thomas Jefferson	United States	20.47	Q
2	Jean-Jacques Boussemart	France	20.54	Q
3	Donald Quarrie	Jamaica	20.57	Q
4	Robson da Silva	Brazil	20.88	Q
5	Julien Thode	Netherlands Antilles	21.45	
6	Tony Sharpe	Canada	21.46	
7	John Goville	Uganda	21.55	
—	Fred Martin	Australia	DNS	

==== Quarterfinal 4 ====
Rank	Athlete	Nation	Time	Notes
1	Kirk Baptiste	United States	20.48	Q
2	Ralf Lübke	West Germany	20.57	Q
3	Gus Young	Jamaica	20.75	Q
4	Carlo Simionato	Italy	20.86	Q
5	Peter Van Miltenburg	Australia	21.09	
6	Luke Watson	Great Britain	21.14	
7	Jamal Al-Abdulla	Qatar	21.44	
—	Neville Hodge	Virgin Islands	DNS	

=== Semifinals ===
==== Semifinal 1 ====
Rank	Athlete	Nation	Time	Notes
1	Kirk Baptiste	United States	20.29	Q
2	Thomas Jefferson	United States	20.40	Q
3	Pietro Mennea	Italy	20.47	Q
4	Jean-Jacques Boussemart	France	20.55	Q
5	Atlee Mahorn	Canada	20.77	
6	Robson da Silva	Brazil	20.80	
7	Gus Young	Jamaica	21.17	
8	Luis Morales	Puerto Rico	21.22	

==== Semifinal 2 ====
Rank	Athlete	Nation	Time	Notes
1	Carl Lewis	United States	20.27	Q
2	João Batista da Silva	Brazil	20.61	Q
3	Ade Mafe	Great Britain	20.63	Q
4	Ralf Lübke	West Germany	20.67	Q
5	Desai Williams	Canada	20.70	
6	Stefano Tilli	Italy	20.72	
7	Donald Quarrie	Jamaica	20.77	
8	Carlo Simionato	Italy	20.92	

=== Final ===
Rank	Athlete	Nation	Time	Notes
1st place, gold medalist(s)	Carl Lewis	United States	19.80	OR
2nd place, silver medalist(s)	Kirk Baptiste	United States	19.96	
3rd place, bronze medalist(s)	Thomas Jefferson	United States	20.26	
4	João Batista da Silva	Brazil	20.30	
5	Ralf Lübke	West Germany	20.51	
6	Jean-Jacques Boussemart	France	20.55	
7	Pietro Mennea	Italy	20.55	
8	Ade Mafe	Great Britain	20.85	

== See also ==
- 1980 Men's Olympic 200 metres (Moscow)
- 1982 Men's European Championships 200 metres (Athens)
- 1983 Men's World Championships 200 metres (Helsinki)
- 1984 Friendship Games 200 metres (Moscow)
- 1986 Men's European Championships 200 metres (Stuttgart)
- 1987 Men's World Championships 200 metres (Rome)
- 1988 Men's Olympic 200 metres (Seoul)
