= 1985 IAAF World Indoor Games – Men's 60 metres =

The men's 60 metres event at the 1985 IAAF World Indoor Games was held at the Palais Omnisports Paris-Bercy on 18 January.

== Medalists ==
| Gold | Silver | Bronze |
|---|---|---|
| Ben Johnson; Canada | Sam Graddy; United States | Ronald Desruelles; Belgium |

== Results ==
=== Heats ===
The winner of each heat (Q) and next 6 fastest (q) qualified for the semifinals.

| Rank | Heat | Name | Nationality | Time | Notes |
|---|---|---|---|---|---|
| 1 | 2 | Ronald Desruelles | Belgium | 6.65 | Q |
| 2 | 4 | Stefan Burkart | Switzerland | 6.66 | Q |
| 3 | 5 | Bruno Marie-Rose | France | 6.67 | Q |
| 4 | 6 | Tony Sharpe | Canada | 6.68 | Q |
| 5 | 3 | Lincoln Asquith | Great Britain | 6.69 | Q |
| 6 | 5 | Cameron Sharp | Great Britain | 6.71 | q |
| 7 | 4 | Ben Johnson | Canada | 6.72 | q |
| 8 | 1 | Sam Graddy | United States | 6.73 | Q |
| 9 | 4 | Antonio Ullo | Italy | 6.75 | q |
| 10 | 6 | Antoine Richard | France | 6.76 | q |
| 11 | 5 | Mohamed Purnomo | Indonesia | 6.77 | q, NR |
| 12 | 3 | Arnaldo da Silva | Brazil | 6.78 | q |
| 13 | 5 | Charles-Louis Seck | Senegal | 6.78 | |
| 14 | 2 | Attila Kovács | Hungary | 6.80 | |
| 14 | 3 | Pierfrancesco Pavoni | Italy | 6.80 | |
| 16 | 5 | Faraj Marzouk | Qatar | 6.82 | |
| 17 | 1 | Anri Grigorov | Bulgaria | 6.83 | |
| 18 | 2 | Kaoru Matsubara | Japan | 6.84 | |
| 19 | 4 | Modesto Castillo | Dominican Republic | 6.85 | NR |
| 20 | 2 | Melvin Lattany | United States | 6.87 | |
| 21 | 1 | Shim Duk-sup | South Korea | 6.89 | NR |
| 22 | 1 | Paulo Correia | Brazil | 6.91 | |
| 23 | 1 | Lars Pedersen | Denmark | 6.92 | |
| 23 | 6 | Clayton Kearney | Australia | 6.92 | |
| 25 | 2 | John Hunt | New Zealand | 6.98 | NR |
| 26 | 4 | Ernawan Witarsa | Indonesia | 6.99 | |
| 27 | 6 | Nabil Nahri | Syria | 7.07 | NR |
| 28 | 3 | Fadi Micaelian | Lebanon | 7.21 | |
| 29 | 3 | Martin Muñoz | Mexico | 7.26 | NR |
| 30 | 2 | Mohamed Samantar | South Yemen | 7.32 | NR |

=== Semifinals ===
First 3 of each semifinal (Q) qualified directly for the final.

| Rank | Heat | Name | Nationality | Time | Notes |
|---|---|---|---|---|---|
| 1 | 1 | Ronald Desruelles | Belgium | 6.62 | Q |
| 1 | 2 | Bruno Marie-Rose | France | 6.62 | Q |
| 3 | 1 | Sam Graddy | United States | 6.65 | Q |
| 4 | 1 | Lincoln Asquith | Great Britain | 6.66 | Q |
| 4 | 1 | Tony Sharpe | Canada | 6.66 | |
| 4 | 2 | Ben Johnson | Canada | 6.66 | Q |
| 4 | 2 | Cameron Sharp | Great Britain | 6.66 | Q, PB |
| 8 | 2 | Antonio Ullo | Italy | 6.71 | |
| 9 | 2 | Stefan Burkart | Switzerland | 6.77 | |
| 10 | 1 | Antoine Richard | France | 6.78 | |
| 10 | 1 | Arnaldo da Silva | Brazil | 6.78 | |
| 10 | 2 | Mohamed Purnomo | Indonesia | 6.78 | |

=== Final ===
| Rank | Lane | Name | Nationality | Time | Notes |
|---|---|---|---|---|---|
| 1st place, gold medalist(s) | 2 | Ben Johnson | Canada | 6.62 | |
| 2nd place, silver medalist(s) | 1 | Sam Graddy | United States | 6.63 | PB |
| 3rd place, bronze medalist(s) | 3 | Ronald Desruelles | Belgium | 6.68 | |
| 4 | 6 | Lincoln Asquith | Great Britain | 6.69 | |
| 5 | 4 | Bruno Marie-Rose | France | 6.73 | |
| 6 | 5 | Cameron Sharp | Great Britain | 6.74 | |
