= Athletics at the 1983 Summer Universiade – Men's 100 metres =

The men's 100 metres event at the 1983 Summer Universiade was held at the Commonwealth Stadium in Edmonton, Canada on 5, 6 and 7 July 1983.

== Medalists ==
Gold	Silver	Bronze
Chidi Imoh; Nigeria	Desai Williams; Canada	Sam Graddy; United States

== Results ==
=== Heats ===
Held on 5 July

Rank	Heat	Athlete	Nationality	Time	Notes
1	3	Katsuhiko Nakaya	Brazil	10.38	Q
2	1	Terry Scott	United States	10.44	Q
3	5	Sam Graddy	United States	10.45	Q
3	5	Ben Johnson	Canada	10.45	Q
5	3	Innocent Egbunike	Nigeria	10.46	Q
6	1	Nikolay Sidorov	Soviet Union	10.55	Q
7	1	Luis Alberto Schneider	Chile	10.58	Q
8	4	Fritz-Werner Heer	West Germany	10.60	Q
9	4	Chidi Imoh	Nigeria	10.62	Q
10	2	Desai Williams	Canada	10.63	Q
11	4	Roland Jokl	Austria	10.66	Q
12	3	Giovanni Grazioli	Italy	10.68	Q
12	5	Jang Jae-keun	South Korea	10.68	Q
14	1	Juan Prada	Spain	10.69	Q
14	1	Thomas Geuven	West Germany	10.69	Q
14	1	Barthélemy Koffi	Ivory Coast	10.69	Q
14	2	Paulo Roberto Correia	Brazil	10.69	Q
18	2	Kosmas Stratos	Greece	10.70	Q
19	2	Mohamed Purnomo	Indonesia	10.71	Q
19	3	Kouadio Otokpa	Ivory Coast	10.71	Q
21	5	Henri Ndinga	Congo	10.72	Q
22	5	Harouna Palé	Upper Volta	10.74	q
23	4	Franco Zucchini	Italy	10.76	Q
24	2	Hideyuki Arikawa	Japan	10.81	q
25	4	Earl Lang	Jamaica	10.81	
26	3	Yoshihiro Shimizu	Japan	10.90	
27	3	Arnaldo Abrantes	Portugal	10.98	
28	3	Clifford Mamba	Swaziland	11.03	
29	5	Rubén Inácio	Angola	11.03	
30	1	Johannes Kardiono	Indonesia	11.10	
31	4	Affonzo Ferraz	Angola	11.11	
32	1	Alan Zammit	Malta	11.15	
33	2	Amitab Rai	India	11.27	
34	5	Jihad Salame	Lebanon	11.31	
35	4	Mbouala Mbouala	Congo	11.45	
36	3	Fadi Ticaelian	Lebanon	11.54	
37	2	José Asturias	Guatemala	11.74	

=== Quarterfinals ===
Held on 6 July

Rank	Heat	Athlete	Nationality	Time	Notes
1	2	Desai Williams	Canada	10.28	Q
2	3	Innocent Egbunike	Nigeria	10.33	Q
3	1	Sam Graddy	United States	10.34	Q
4	3	Ben Johnson	Canada	10.37	Q
5	2	Terry Scott	United States	10.38	Q
6	4	Chidi Imoh	Nigeria	10.41	Q
7	4	Katsuhiko Nakaya	Brazil	10.43	Q
8	1	Nikolay Sidorov	Soviet Union	10.46	Q
9	1	Paulo Roberto Correia	Brazil	10.56	Q
10	1	Roland Jokl	Austria	10.60	q
11	4	Fritz-Werner Heer	West Germany	10.61	Q
12	1	Harouna Palé	Upper Volta	10.62	q
12	3	Jang Jae-keun	South Korea	10.62	Q
12	3	Giovanni Grazioli	Italy	10.62	q
15	2	Luis Alberto Schneider	Chile	10.64	Q
16	2	Franco Zucchini	Italy	10.64	q
17	1	Mohamed Purnomo	Indonesia	10.65	
17	3	Henri Ndinga	Congo	10.65	
19	3	Kouadio Otokpa	Ivory Coast	10.67	
20	2	Kosmas Stratos	Greece	10.68	
21	2	Thomas Geuven	West Germany	10.73	
22	4	Hideyuki Arikawa	Japan	10.81	
23	4	Juan Prada	Spain	10.87	
24	4	Barthélemy Koffi	Ivory Coast	10.96	

=== Semifinals ===
Held on 7 July

Wind:
Heat 1: +0.6 m/s, Heat 2: +0.5 m/s

Rank	Heat	Athlete	Nationality	Time	Notes
1	2	Desai Williams	Canada	10.22	Q
2	2	Chidi Imoh	Nigeria	10.23	Q
3	2	Katsuhiko Nakaya	Brazil	10.25	Q, PB
4	2	Sam Graddy	United States	10.29	q
5	1	Innocent Egbunike	Nigeria	10.31	Q
6	1	Terry Scott	United States	10.31	Q
7	1	Nikolay Sidorov	Soviet Union	10.38	Q
8	1	Ben Johnson	Canada	10.39	q
9	2	Fritz-Werner Heer	West Germany	10.44	
10	1	Paulo Roberto Correia	Brazil	10.50	
11	1	Luis Alberto Schneider	Chile	10.52	
12	1	Jang Jae-keun	South Korea	10.54	
13	2	Roland Jokl	Austria	10.55	
14	1	Giovanni Grazioli	Italy	10.56	
15	2	Harouna Pale	Upper Volta	10.58	
16	2	Franco Zucchini	Italy	10.61	

=== Final ===
Held on 7 July

Wind: -0.8 m/s

Rank	Athlete	Nationality	Time	Notes
1st place, gold medalist(s)	Chidi Imoh	Nigeria	10.33	
2nd place, silver medalist(s)	Desai Williams	Canada	10.37	
3rd place, bronze medalist(s)	Sam Graddy	United States	10.42	
4	Terry Scott	United States	10.43	
5	Ben Johnson	Canada	10.44	
6	Katsuhiko Nakaya	Brazil	10.45	
7	Innocent Egbunike	Nigeria	10.49	
8	Nikolay Sidorov	Soviet Union	10.55	
