= Lightbourne =

Lightbourne is a surname. Notable people with the surname include:

- Audrick Lightbourne, Bahamian sprinter
- Dorothy Lightbourne, Jamaican politician
- Josephine Lightbourne, fictional character
- Kyle Lightbourne, Bermudian professional footballer
- Leonardo Lightbourne, Bahamian politician
- Phyllis Lightbourne-Jones, Bermudian sprinter
- Quinton Lightbourne, Bahamian politician
- Wendell Lightbourne, Bermudian serial killer
- Zane Lightbourne, Bahamian politician

== See also ==
- Lightbournus
