= Athletics at the 1981 Summer Universiade – Men's 4 × 100 metres relay =

The men's 4 × 100 metres relay event at the 1981 Summer Universiade was held at the Stadionul Naţional in Bucharest on 25 and 26 July 1981.

== Results ==
=== Heats ===
Rank	Heat	Nation	Athletes	Time	Notes
1	2	United States	Mel Lattany, Anthony Ketchum, Jason Grimes, Calvin Smith	38.95	Q
2	1	Soviet Union	Aleksandr Aksinin, Andrey Shlyapnikov, Nikolay Sidorov, Vladimir Muravyov	39.32	Q
3	2	France	Philippe Le Joncour, Stéphane Adam, Gabriel Brothier, Aldo Canti	39.55	Q
4	1	Cuba	Israel Alfonso, Juan Saborit, Tomás González, Leandro Peñalver	39.60	Q
5	2	Italy	Gianfranco Lazzer, Diego Nodari, Stefano Curini, Mauro Zuliani	39.66	Q
6	1	Romania	Constantin Ivan, Cornel Hapaianu, Vasile Selever, Paul Stanciu	40.11	Q
7	1	Ivory Coast	Avognan Nogboum, Degnan Kablan, Barthélémy Koffi, Kouadio Otokpa	40.18	q
8	2	Senegal	Siong Gomis, Sory Sangaré, Mamadou Sène, Hamidou Diawara	41.27	q
9	1	Mexico	Rafael Domínguez, Enrique Vizcarra, Yukihiro Minami, Jorge Burgos	41.74	
10	1	Lebanon	Roland Dagher, Chanine Njeim, Patrick Arache, Jihad Salame	42.92	

=== Final ===
Rank	Nation	Athletes	Time	Notes
1st place, gold medalist(s)	United States	Mel Lattany, Anthony Ketchum, Jason Grimes, Calvin Smith	38.70	
2nd place, silver medalist(s)	Soviet Union	Andrey Shlyapnikov, Nikolay Sidorov, Aleksandr Aksinin, Vladimir Muravyov	38.94	
3rd place, bronze medalist(s)	France	Philippe Le Joncour, Stéphane Adam, Gabriel Brothier, Aldo Canti	39.50	
4	Cuba	Israel Alfonso, Juan Saborit, Tomás González, Leandro Peñalver	39.58	
5	Romania	Pal Palffy, Cornel Hapaianu, Vasile Selever, Paul Stanciu	40.09	
6	Italy	Gianfranco Lazzer, Diego Nodari, Stefano Curini, Mauro Zuliani	40.14	
7	Ivory Coast	Avognan Nogboum, Degnan Kablan, Barthélémy Koffi, Kouadio Otokpa	40.37	
8	Senegal	Boubacar Diallo, Sory Sangaré, Mamadou Sène, Hamidou Diawara	40.75	
