= 1985 IAAF World Indoor Games – Men's 200 metres =

The men's 200 metres event at the 1985 IAAF World Indoor Games was held at the Palais Omnisports Paris-Bercy on 19 January.

== Medalists ==
Gold	Silver	Bronze
Aleksandr Yevgenyev; Soviet Union	Ade Mafe; Great Britain	João Batista da Silva; Brazil

== Results ==
=== Heats ===
The winner of each heat (Q) and next 7 fastest (q) qualified for the semifinals.

Rank	Heat	Name	Nationality	Time	Notes
1	3	João Batista da Silva	Brazil	21.38	Q
2	2	Dennis Mitchell	United States	21.39	Q
3	4	Aleksandr Yevgenyev	Soviet Union	21.54	Q
4	3	Stefano Tilli	Italy	21.57	q
5	5	Ade Mafe	Great Britain	21.58	Q
6	1	Albert Robinson	United States	21.63	Q
7	1	Patrick Barré	France	21.72	q
8	4	Mohamed Purnomo	Indonesia	21.74	q
9	4	Daniel Sangouma	France	21.75	q
10	2	Clayton Kearney	Australia	21.76	q
11	2	Georgios Vamvakas	Greece	21.84	q
12	5	David Peltier	Barbados	21.97	q
13	1	Anri Grigorov	Bulgaria	22.01	
14	5	Giovanni Bongiorni	Italy	22.13	
15	4	Agustín Pavó	Cuba	22.48	
16	1	Jasem Goma'an Al-Duaillah	Kuwait	22.63	NR
17	4	Mohamed Samantar	South Yemen	22.95	NR
18	1	Alberto Izu	Peru	23.01	
19	2	Jorge Burgos	Mexico	23.44	NR
20	3	Nabil Nahri	Syria	23.47	NR
	3	Roberto Ramos	Cuba	DNF	

=== Semifinals ===
First 3 of each semifinal (Q) qualified directly for the final.

Rank	Heat	Name	Nationality	Time	Notes
1	2	Aleksandr Yevgenyev	Soviet Union	21.11	Q
2	2	Ade Mafe	Great Britain	21.13	Q
3	1	Daniel Sangouma	France	21.20	Q
4	1	Albert Robinson	United States	21.23	Q
5	2	Dennis Mitchell	United States	21.33	Q
6	1	João Batista da Silva	Brazil	21.36	Q
7	1	Stefano Tilli	Italy	21.38	
8	2	Patrick Barré	France	21.54	
9	1	Mohamed Purnomo	Indonesia	21.58	AR
10	2	Clayton Kearney	Australia	21.67	AR
11	1	David Peltier	Barbados	21.82	
12	2	Georgios Vamvakas	Greece	22.08	

=== Final ===
Rank	Name	Nationality	Time	Notes
1st place, gold medalist(s)	Aleksandr Yevgenyev	Soviet Union	20.95	
2nd place, silver medalist(s)	Ade Mafe	Great Britain	20.96	PB
3rd place, bronze medalist(s)	João Batista da Silva	Brazil	21.19	
4	Daniel Sangouma	France	21.36	
5	Albert Robinson	United States	21.54	
6	Dennis Mitchell	United States	21.92	
