= Athletics at the 1984 Summer Olympics – Men's 100 metres =

Men's 100 metres at the Games of the XXIII Olympiad
- Venue: Los Angeles Memorial Coliseum
- Dates: August 3 (heats and quarterfinals); August 4 (semifinals and final)
- Competitors: 82 from 59 nations
- Winning time: 9.99

Medalists
1st place, gold medalist(s)		Carl Lewis; United States
2nd place, silver medalist(s)		Sam Graddy; United States
3rd place, bronze medalist(s)		Ben Johnson; Canada

Official Video Highlights

The men's 100 metres sprint event at the 1984 Olympic Games took place between August 3 and August 4. Eighty-two athletes from 59 countries participated. Each nation was limited to 3 athletes per rules in force since the 1930 Olympic Congress. The event was won by Carl Lewis of the United States, that nation's first title after two Games of missing the podium (4th in 1976, boycotted in 1980). Canada's Ben Johnson took bronze to break up the Americans' bid to sweep the podium (which they had done in 1904 and 1912); it was Canada's first medal in the event since 1964.

== Background ==
This was the twentieth time the event was held, having appeared at every Olympics since the first in 1896. Defending gold medal winner Allan Wells of Great Britain was the only finalist from the Moscow Games to return. The American team was strong, led by 1983 World Championship winner Carl Lewis, who was attempting to match Jesse Owens's 1936 quadruple (100, 200, 4x100, and long jump). Sam Graddy and Ron Brown were the other members of the United States squad, edging out world record holder and World Championships runner-up Calvin Smith. Challengers to the hosts included World Championship finalists Wells, Paul Narracott of Australia, Christian Haas of West Germany, and Desai Williams of Canada, as well as up-and-coming Canadian sprinter Ben Johnson.

Thirteen nations appeared in the event for the first time: Antigua and Barbuda, Bangladesh, the British Virgin Islands, China (in its People's Republic form), Costa Rica, Equatorial Guinea, The Gambia, Mauritius, Oman, Qatar, the Solomon Islands, Swaziland, and the United Arab Emirates. The United States made its 19th appearance in the event, most of any country, having missed only the boycotted 1980 Games.

== Competition format ==
The event retained the same basic four round format introduced in 1920: heats, quarterfinals, semifinals, and a final. The "fastest loser" system, introduced in 1968, was used again to ensure that the quarterfinals and subsequent rounds had exactly 8 runners per heat; this time, the system was used in both the preliminaries and quarterfinals.

The first round consisted of 11 heats, each with 7 or 8 athletes. The top three runners in each heat advanced, along with the next seven fastest runners overall. This made 40 quarterfinalists, who were divided into 5 heats of 8 runners. The top three runners in each quarterfinal advanced, with one "fastest loser" place. The 16 semifinalists competed in two heats of 8, with the top four in each semifinal advancing to the eight-man final.

== Records ==
These are the standing world and Olympic records (in seconds) prior to the 1980 Summer Olympics.

World record	9.93	(United States) Calvin Smith	Colorado Springs (United States)	July 3, 1983
Olympic record	9.95	(United States) Jim Hines	Mexico City (Mexico)	October 14, 1968

== Results ==
=== Heats ===
The top three runners in each of the eleven heats and the next seven fastest, advanced to the quarterfinal round.

==== Heat 1 ====
Rank	Athlete	Nation	Time	Notes
1	Carl Lewis	United States	10.32	Q
2	Tony Sharpe	Canada	10.38	Q
3	Mike McFarlane	Great Britain	10.47	Q
4	Hasely Crawford	Trinidad and Tobago	10.48	q
5	Peter Van Miltenburg	Australia	10.55	q
6	Vicente Daniel	Mozambique	10.81	
7	Henry Ngolwe	Zambia	10.94	
8	Paul Réneau	Belize	10.96	

==== Heat 2 ====
Rank	Athlete	Nation	Time	Notes
1	Allan Wells	Great Britain	10.32	Q
2	Mohamed Purnomo	Indonesia	10.40	Q
3	José Javier Arqués	Spain	10.42	Q
4	Marc Gasparoni	France	10.47	q
5	Emilio Samayoa	Guatemala	10.84	
6	Barnabé Messomo	Cameroon	10.98	
7	Charles Mbazira	Uganda	11.03	
8	Mohamed Abdullah	United Arab Emirates	11.11	

==== Heat 3 ====
Rank	Athlete	Nation	Time	Notes
1	Desai Williams	Canada	10.35	Q
2	Chidi Imoh	Nigeria	10.39	Q
3	Charles-Louis Seck	Senegal	10.45	Q
4	Christian Nenepath	Indonesia	10.66	
4	Henri Ndinga	Republic of the Congo	10.66	
6	Abdullah Sulaiman Al-Akbary	Oman	10.86	
7	Inoke Bainimoli	Fiji	11.15	
8	Daniel André	Mauritius	11.19	

==== Heat 4 ====
Rank	Athlete	Nation	Time	Notes
1	Sumet Promna	Thailand	10.52	Q
2	Paul Narracott	Australia	10.55	Q
3	Neville Hodge	Virgin Islands	10.58	Q
4	Audrick Lightbourne	Bahamas	10.64	
5	Gus Young	Jamaica	10.64	
6	Bill Trott	Bermuda	10.76	
7	Kgosiemang Khumoyarano	Botswana	11.49	

==== Heat 5 ====
Rank	Athlete	Nation	Time	Notes
1	Sam Graddy	United States	10.29	Q
2	Donovan Reid	Great Britain	10.41	Q
3	Jürgen Evers	West Germany	10.54	Q
4	Hiroki Fuwa	Japan	10.56	
5	Philip Attipoe	Ghana	10.60	
6	Jean-Yves Mallat	Lebanon	10.83	
7	Markus Büchel	Liechtenstein	10.98	
8	Clifford Mamba	Swaziland	11.24	

==== Heat 6 ====
Rank	Athlete	Nation	Time	Notes
1	Ray Stewart	Jamaica	10.24	Q
2	Antoine Richard	France	10.35	Q
3	Antonio Ullo	Italy	10.36	Q
4	Paulo Roberto Correia	Brazil	10.45	q
5	Anthony Jones	Barbados	10.69	
6	Oliver Daniels	Liberia	10.76	
7	Muhammad Mansha	Pakistan	10.87	

==== Heat 7 ====
Rank	Athlete	Nation	Time	Notes
1	Ben Johnson	Canada	10.35	Q
2	Yu Zhuanghui	China	10.53	Q
3	Bruno Marie-Rose	France	10.59	Q
4	Earl Haley	Guyana	10.74	
5	Julien Thode	Netherlands Antilles	10.92	
6	Ronald Russell	Virgin Islands	11.02	
7	Denis Rose	Seychelles	11.04	

==== Heat 8 ====
Rank	Athlete	Nation	Time	Notes
1	Ronald Desruelles	Belgium	10.46	Q
2	Stefano Tilli	Italy	10.48	Q
3	Fred Martin	Australia	10.64	Q
4	Luís Barroso	Portugal	10.76	
5	Gustavo Envela	Equatorial Guinea	10.79	
6	Oumar Fye	The Gambia	10.87	
7	Anthony Henry	Antigua and Barbuda	10.99	
8	Saidur Rahman Dawn	Bangladesh	11.25	

==== Heat 9 ====
Rank	Athlete	Nation	Time	Notes
1	Ron Brown	United States	10.58	Q
2	Luis Morales	Puerto Rico	10.60	Q
3	Nelson dos Santos	Brazil	10.70	Q
4	Ralf Lübke	West Germany	10.70	
5	Collins Mensah	Ghana	10.92	
6	Ivan Benjamin	Sierra Leone	11.13	
7	Johnson Kere	Solomon Islands	11.57	

==== Heat 10 ====
Rank	Athlete	Nation	Time	Notes
1	Norman Edwards	Jamaica	10.57	Q
2	Dudley Parker	Bahamas	10.65	Q
3	Kouadio Otokpa	Ivory Coast	10.72	Q
4	Pierfrancesco Pavoni	Italy	10.72	
5	Faraj Saad Marzouk	Qatar	10.78	
6	Odiya Silweya	Malawi	11.22	
7	Glen Abrahams	Costa Rica	11.31	

==== Heat 11 ====
Rank	Athlete	Nation	Time	Notes
1	Christian Haas	West Germany	10.41	Q
2	Alfonso Pitters	Panama	10.50	Q
3	Katsuhiko Nakaya	Brazil	10.55	Q
4	Bakary Jarjue	The Gambia	10.68	
5	Sim Deok-seop	South Korea	10.72	
6	Guy Hill	British Virgin Islands	11.11	
7	Aldo Salandra	El Salvador	11.31	

=== Quarterfinals ===
The top three runners in each of the five heats and the next fastest one, advanced to the semifinal round.

==== Quarterfinal 1 ====
Rank	Athlete	Nation	Time	Notes
1	Ben Johnson	Canada	10.41	Q
2	Donovan Reid	Great Britain	10.47	Q
3	Christian Haas	West Germany	10.51	Q
4	Hasely Crawford	Trinidad and Tobago	10.56	
5	Antonio Ullo	Italy	10.57	
6	Bruno Marie-Rose	France	10.60	
7	Paul Narracott	Australia	10.60	
8	Alfonso Pitters	Panama	10.63	

==== Quarterfinal 2 ====
Rank	Athlete	Nation	Time	Notes
1	Sam Graddy	United States	10.15	Q
2	Tony Sharpe	Canada	10.33	Q
3	Norman Edwards	Jamaica	10.44	Q
4	Nelson dos Santos	Brazil	10.53	
5	Charles-Louis Seck	Senegal	10.54	
6	Yu Zhuanghui	China	10.59	
7	Neville Hodge	Virgin Islands	10.69	
—	Ronald Desruelles	Belgium	DNS	

==== Quarterfinal 3 ====
Rank	Athlete	Nation	Time	Notes
1	Stefano Tilli	Italy	10.39	Q
2	Ron Brown	United States	10.40	Q
3	Marc Gasparoni	France	10.56	Q
4	Sumet Promna	Thailand	10.61	
5	Katsuhiko Nakaya	Brazil	10.69	
6	Hiroki Fuwa	Japan	10.75	
7	Philip Attipoe	Ghana	10.78	
8	Kouadio Otokpa	Ivory Coast	10.80	

==== Quarterfinal 4 ====
Rank	Athlete	Nation	Time	Notes
1	Ray Stewart	Jamaica	10.30	Q
2	Allan Wells	Great Britain	10.33	Q
3	Mohamed Purnomo	Indonesia	10.43	Q
4	José Javier Arqués	Spain	10.52	
4	Peter Van Miltenburg	Australia	10.52	
6	Antoine Richard	France	10.53	
7	Paulo Roberto Correia	Brazil	10.54	
8	Audrick Lightbourne	Bahamas	10.59	

==== Quarterfinal 5 ====
Rank	Athlete	Nation	Time	Notes
1	Carl Lewis	United States	10.04	Q
2	Desai Williams	Canada	10.27	Q
3	Luis Morales	Puerto Rico	10.35	Q
4	Mike McFarlane	Great Britain	10.36	q
5	Chidi Imoh	Nigeria	10.42	
6	Dudley Parker	Bahamas	10.58	
7	Fred Martin	Australia	10.61	
8	Jürgen Evers	West Germany	10.69	

=== Semifinals ===
The top four runners in each of the two heats advanced to the final round.

==== Semifinal 1 ====
The wind was +0.7 m/s.

Rank	Athlete	Nation	Time	Notes
1	Ray Stewart	Jamaica	10.26	Q
2	Sam Graddy	United States	10.27	Q
3	Donovan Reid	Great Britain	10.32	Q
4	Ron Brown	United States	10.34	Q
5	Desai Williams	Canada	10.34	
6	Christian Haas	West Germany	10.41	
7	Marc Gasparoni	France	10.49	
8	Mohamed Purnomo	Indonesia	10.51	

==== Semifinal 2 ====
The wind was -1.5 m/s.

Rank	Athlete	Nation	Time	Notes
1	Carl Lewis	United States	10.14	Q
2	Ben Johnson	Canada	10.42	Q
3	Mike McFarlane	Great Britain	10.45	Q
4	Tony Sharpe	Canada	10.52	Q
5	Luis Morales	Puerto Rico	10.54	
6	Stefano Tilli	Italy	10.55	
7	Norman Edwards	Jamaica	10.63	
8	Allan Wells	Great Britain	10.71	

=== Final ===
Wind = + 0.2 m/s

Rank	Athlete	Nation	Time	Notes
1st place, gold medalist(s)	Carl Lewis	United States	9.99	
2nd place, silver medalist(s)	Sam Graddy	United States	10.19	
3rd place, bronze medalist(s)	Ben Johnson	Canada	10.22	
4	Ron Brown	United States	10.26	
5	Mike McFarlane	Great Britain	10.27	
6	Ray Stewart	Jamaica	10.29	
7	Donovan Reid	Great Britain	10.33	
8	Tony Sharpe	Canada	10.35	

== See also ==
- Athletics at the Friendship Games – Men's 100 metres
