= Kade (Ghana parliament constituency) =

Ghana parliament constituency

- constituency for the Parliament of Ghana
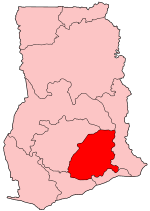
- District: Kwaebibirem District
- Region: Eastern Region of Ghana

Current constituency
- Party: New Patriotic Party
- MP: Alexander Agyare

The Kade constituency is in the Eastern region of Ghana. The member of Parliament for the constituency in 2016 was Kwabena Ohemeng-Tinyase. He was elected on the ticket of the New Patriotic Party (NPP) during the 2016 election.

He succeeded Ofosu Asamoah who won a majority of 11,852 votes more than candidate closest in the race, to win the constituency election to become the MP in 2012 election

In the 2020 Ghanaian general election, Alexander Agyare was voted into Parliament of Ghana, on the ticket of the New Patriotic Party, with 32,550 votes, beating the National Democratic Congress (Ghana)'s candidate, Emmanuel Kofi who polled 14,079 votes.

== Members of Parliament ==
First elected	Member	Party
First Republic
1965	Kwesi Amoako-Atta	Convention People's Party
Second Republic
1969	Kwaku Bugyei Ntim	Progress Party
Third Republic
1979	A. B. Ankomah	United National Convention
Fourth Republic
1992	John Darlington Brobbey	National Democratic Congress
1996	Francis Kwame Nyarko	New Patriotic Party
2000	Ofosu Asamoah	New Patriotic Party
2016	Kwabena Ohemeng-Tinyase	New Patriotic Party
2020	Alexander Agyare	New Patriotic Party

== Election results ==
2024 Ghanaian general election: Kade
Party	Candidate	Votes	%	±%
NPP	Alexander Agyare	20,225	48.64	
NDC	Emmanuel Kofi Nti	16,638	40.02	
Independent	Kwabena Ohemeng-Tinyase	4,714	11.34	—
Majority		3,587	8.62	
Turnout		42,133	57.71	—
Registered electors		70,975		

== See also ==
- List of Ghana Parliament constituencies
