= Adnan Houri =

Syrian discus thrower

Personal information
- Native name: عدناحوري
- Nationality: Syrian
- Born: 13 February 1955 (age 71)
- Height: 1.85 m (6 ft 1 in)
- Weight: 102 kg (225 lb)

Sport
- Country: Syria
- Sport: Athletics
- Event(s): Discus throw, Shot put
Medal record
Men's athletics
Representing Syria
Pan Arab Games
Gold medal – first place	1976 Damascus	Shot put
Silver medal – second place	1976 Damascus	Discus throw
Arab Championships
Silver medal – second place	1977 Damascus	Discus throw
Silver medal – second place	1979 Baghdad	Discus throw
Bronze medal – third place	1977 Damascus	Shot put
Bronze medal – third place	1983 Amman	Discus throw

Adnan Houri (Arabic: عدنان حوري; born 13 February 1955) is a Syrian athlete. He competed in the men's discus throw at the 1980 Summer Olympics, finished on 16th place (47.52) and did not qualify to final. Won Pan Arab Games title in shot put. Earned four medals at Arab Championships. Became first Syrian man to break 50 m in discus and 16 m in SP. His shot put record was unbroken for 22 years.

== Personal bests ==
Outdoor

- Shot put: 16.09 (Potsdam 1987)
- Discus throw: 50.60 (Potsdam 1983)

== Competition record ==
Year	Competition	Venue	Position	Event	Notes
Representing Syria
1976	Pan Arab Games	Damascus, Syria	1st	Shot put	15.35 m CR
1976	Pan Arab Games	Damascus, Syria	2nd	Discus throw	46.68 m
1977	Arab Championships	Damascus, Syria	2nd	Discus throw	45.22 m
1977	Arab Championships	Damascus, Syria	3rd	Shot put	15.15 m
1979	Arab Championships	Baghdad, Iraq	2nd	Discus throw	49.08 m
1980	Olympic Games	Moscow, USSR	16th (q)	Discus throw	47.52 m
1983	World Championships	Helsinki, Finland	26th (q)	Discus throw	48.34 m
1983	Arab Championships	Amman, Jordan	3rd	Discus throw	48.40 m
