= Alexander Agyare =

Ghanaian politician

Hon. Alexander Agyare
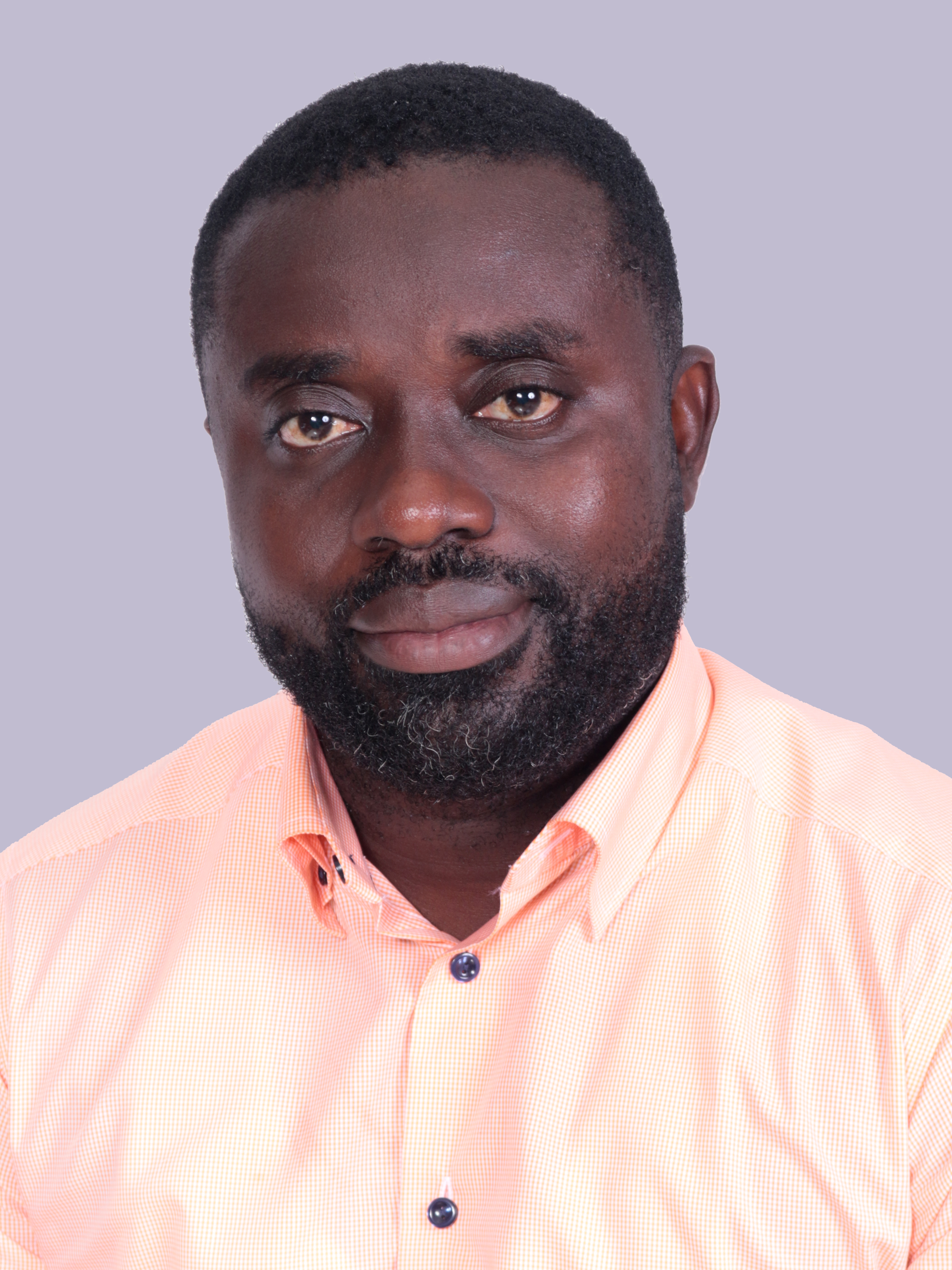

Member of Parliament for Kade Constituency
- Incumbent
- Assumed office 7 January 2021
- Preceded by: Ofosu Asamoah

Personal details
- Born: Alexander Kwadwo Agyare; 6 January 1979 (age 47) Pramkese, Ghana
- Party: New Patriotic Party
- Occupation: Politician
- Committees: Members Holding Offices of Profit Committee, Roads and Transport Committee

Alexander Agyare (born 8 January 1979) is a Ghanaian politician who is a member of the New Patriotic Party. He is the member of parliament for the Kade constituency in the Eastern Region of Ghana

== Early life and education ==
Agyare was born in Pramkese. He holds a MSC in Procurement & Logistic Management.
