= 1979 Arab Athletics Championships =

2nd Arab Athletics Championships
- Dates: 23–26 October
- Host city: Baghdad, Iraq
- Events: 32

The 1979 Arab Athletics Championships was the second edition of the international athletics competition between Arab countries. It took place in Baghdad, Iraq from 23–26 October. As of 2015, it remains the only senior international athletics competition to have been held in the country.

Following the men-only inaugural tournament, the second edition marked the introduction of a women's programme. A total of 32 athletics events were contested, 22 for men and 10 for women. The men's decathlon became the combined track and field event to be contested at the championships, and the men's hammer throw was also added to the schedule. Women athletes, entered by four nations, competed in short track running events, as well as two jumping and three throwing field events. This represented the first major gathering of Arab women at an athletics championships – the Pan Arab Games did not admit women in the sport until six years later.

== Medal summary ==
=== Men ===
Event	Gold		Silver		Bronze	
100 metres	Nabil Nahri (SYR)	10.97	Sami Shaykhali (IRQ)	10.99	Heitham Nadim (IRQ)	11.06
200 metres	Heitham Nadim (IRQ)	21.14	Nabil Nahri (SYR)	21.45	Farhan Salmeen (QAT)	21.82
400 metres	Mehdi Ahmed Salah (LBA)	47.82	Béchir El Fallah (LBA)	47.96	Fahem Abdessada (IRQ)	47.99
800 metres	Mohamed Alouini (TUN)	1:51.71	Khaled Khalifa (KUW)	1:53.98	Salem Mohamed Salem (LBA)	1:54.28
1500 metres	Khaled Khalifa (KUW)	3:58.4	Messaad Neji (QAT)	3:58.5	Amara Chiha (TUN)	3:59.0
5000 metres	Abdul Amir Naji (IRQ)	14:40.0	Amara Chiha (TUN)	14:41.9	Mofleh Saad Messaoud (QAT)	14:42.9
10,000 metres	Shabib Dagher (IRQ)	31:41.02	Abdul Amir Naji (IRQ)	32:00.37	Ibrahim Ettaher (QAT)	32:43.08
110 metres hurdles	Abdul Jabbar Rahima (IRQ)	14.83	Fahan Sultan Nasir (IRQ)	14.86	Matar Achour (KUW)	15.51
400 metres hurdles	Hussein Kadhum (IRQ)	51.16	Abdul Jabbar Rahima (IRQ)	51.76	Maâouia Ali El Houly (LBA)	53.59
3000 metres steeplechase	Sabir Hantoush (IRQ)	9:00.87	Abdelkarim Jomâa (SYR)	9:07.45	Amara Chiha (TUN)	9:09.32
4 × 100 m relay	Iraq (IRQ)	41.27	Syria (SYR)	41.90	Kuwait (KUW)	42.40
4 × 400 m relay	Iraq (IRQ)	3:12.48	Libya (LBA)	3:14.24	Syria (SYR)	3:18.16
Marathon	Abdullah El Souki (LBA)	2:34:44	Karim Abboud (IRQ)	2:38:48	Abdelhussein Ali (BHR)	2:46:25
High jump	Ahmed Kassim (IRQ)	2.03 m	Ghazi Marzouk (KSA)	2.03 m	Moncer Mohamed Salah (QAT)	2.00 m
Pole vault	Mohamed Bensaad (ALG)	4.40 m	Kesra Ahmed (IRQ)	4.30 m	Abdallah Awadh (KSA)	4.20 m
Long jump	Mehdi Khadum (IRQ)	7.25 m	Zied Kat (SYR)	7.09 m	Abdessalem El Bashti (LBA)	6.98 m
Triple jump	Mojhed Farid (IRQ)	15.98 m	Mehdi Khadum (IRQ)	15.82 m	Féthi Ouertani (TUN)	14.94 m
Shot put	Mohammed Al-Zinkawi (KUW)	16.82 m	Ahmed Hassen Miled (LBA)	16.46 m	Shokr Mahmoud (IRQ)	15.15 m
Discus throw	Abderrazak Ben Hassine (TUN)	51.46 m	Adnan Houry (SYR)	49.08 m	Shawki Hajji (IRQ)	47.40 m
Hammer throw	Youssef Ben Abid (TUN)	52.43 m	Khaled Ghalloum (KUW)	45.44 m	Abbes Jabbar (IRQ)	44.62 m
Javelin throw	Ali Memmi (TUN)	71.50 m	Tarek Chaabani (TUN)	70.76 m	Matar El Karfi (KSA)	65.30 m
Decathlon	Elie Sfeir (LIB)	6576 pts	Jassem Jabr (IRQ)	6417 pts	Abdessatar Mouelhi (TUN)	6228 pts

=== Women ===
Event	Gold		Silver		Bronze	
100 metres	Iman Nouri (IRQ)	12.85	Houda Nahedh (LIB)	13.23	Raya Tatunji (SYR)	13.60
200 metres	Sarra Touibi (TUN)	25.78	Anouar Abdelmohsen (IRQ)	26.25	Houda Nahedh (LIB)	26.77
400 metres	Sarra Touibi (TUN)	57.48	Chaoub Kahtane (IRQ)	59.78	Hala El-Moughrabi (SYR)	59.94
800 metres	Souad Derouiche (TUN)	2:11.24	Hala El-Moughrabi (SYR)	2:16.62	Ahlem Ibrahim (IRQ)	2:29.22
100 metres hurdles	Iman Nouri (IRQ)	15.96	Raya Tatunji (SYR)	16.56	Not awarded	
High jump	Kawther Akrémi (TUN)	1.74 m	Raya Tatunji (SYR)	1.58 m	Zeina Mina (LIB)	1.40 m
Long jump	Kawther Akrémi (TUN)	5.51 m	Iman Nouri (IRQ)	5.43 m	Raya Tatunji (SYR)	5.09 m
Shot put	Fathia Jerbi (TUN)	11.70 m	Fayda Awada (IRQ)	11.60 m	Raja Hatem (SYR)	8.90 m
Discus throw	Fathia Jerbi (TUN)	46.80 m	Raja Hatem (SYR)	34.42 m	Sahera Mohamed Ali (IRQ)	26.52 m
Javelin throw	Wissem Chennoufi (TUN)	37.30 m	Hamdia Essammak (IRQ)	35.80 m	Najah Farah (SYR)	34.98 m

== Medal table ==
=== Overall ===
Rank	Nation	Gold	Silver	Bronze	Total
1	Iraq (IRQ)	13	13	7	33
2	Tunisia (TUN)	12	2	4	18
3	Libya (LBA)	2	3	3	8
4	Kuwait (KUW)	2	2	2	6
5	Syria (SYR)	1	9	6	16
6	Lebanon (LIB)	1	1	2	4
7	Algeria (ALG)	1	0	0	1
8	Qatar (QAT)	0	1	4	5
9	Saudi Arabia (KSA)	0	1	2	3
10	Bahrain (BHR)	0	0	1	1
11	Palestine (PLE)	0	0	0	0
11	United Arab Emirates (UAE)	0	0	0	0
Totals (12 entries)		32	32	31	95

=== Men ===
Rank	Nation	Gold	Silver	Bronze	Total
1	Iraq (IRQ)	11	8	5	24
2	Tunisia (TUN)	4	2	4	10
3	Libya (LBA)	2	3	3	8
4	Kuwait (KUW)	2	2	2	6
5	Syria (SYR)	1	5	1	7
6	Algeria (ALG)	1	0	0	1
6	Lebanon (LIB)	1	0	0	1
8	Qatar (QAT)	0	1	4	5
9	Saudi Arabia (KSA)	0	1	2	3
10	Bahrain (BHR)	0	0	1	1
11	Palestine (PLE)	0	0	0	0
11	United Arab Emirates (UAE)	0	0	0	0
Totals (12 entries)		22	22	22	66

=== Women ===
Rank	Nation	Gold	Silver	Bronze	Total
1	Tunisia (TUN)	8	0	0	8
2	Iraq (IRQ)	2	5	2	9
3	Syria (SYR)	0	4	5	9
4	Lebanon (LIB)	0	1	2	3
Totals (4 entries)		10	10	9	29
