= Brobbey =

Brobbey is a surname. Notable people with the surname include:

- Brian Brobbey (born 2002), Dutch footballer
- Emelia Brobbey (born 1982), Ghanaian actress, television presenter and musician
- John Darlington Brobbey (born 1939), Ghanaian politician
- Stephen Alan Brobbey, Ghanaian jurist

== See also ==
- Brobbey Mensah (born 1934), Ghanaian sprinter
- Brobby
