= 1977 Arab Athletics Championships =

1st Arab Athletics Championships
- Host city: Damascus, Syria
- Events: 22
- Participation: 12 nations

The 1977 Arab Athletics Championships was the inaugural edition of the international athletics competition between Arab countries. It took place in Damascus, Syria, coming one year after the city had hosted the 1976 Pan Arab Games. The absence of Egypt, Algeria and Morocco—the three foremost Arab nations in the sport—meant the level of competition was lower than that seen at the games. Iraq was the dominant nation, winning half the gold medals, and Tunisia was a clear second place with five golds. The hosts, Syria, placed third with a medal haul of twelve. Eight of the twelve participating nations reached the medal table.

A total of 22 athletics events were contested, all by men. The schedule mirrored that of the recent Pan Arab Games, with the exception of the hammer throw and decathlon, which were not held here. Women athletes were not included at the competition until the following edition in 1979.

Iraq's Falah Naji Jarallah was the most successful athlete of the games, having taken a middle-distance running double in the 800 metres and 1500 metres. He was the only athlete to win two individual titles in Damascus. Iraq athletes won all the track events bar the long-distance races, where Tunisia's Mansour Guettaya and Abdelkader Zaddem were dominant, and the steeplechase (won by Syria's Samir Mustapha). Four Arab champions also won an individual silver as well: Guettaya (1500 m and 5000 m), Abbas Al-Aibi (400 m and 800 m), Heitham Nadim (100 m and 200 m) and Hussein Dawood (horizontal jumps).

The establishment of the competition brought an increase in regional competition, particularly for African Arab nations as the African Championships in Athletics was not established until two years later. For such nations, the Maghreb Athletics Championships, first held in 1967, served as a partial precursor to the broader Arab Championships.

== Medal summary ==
Event	Gold		Silver		Bronze	
100 metres	Heitham Nadim (IRQ)	10.97	Hedi Essaleh (IRQ)	10.99	Farhan Salmeen (QAT)	11.06
200 metres	Farhan Abdesada (IRQ)	21.56	Heitham Nadim (IRQ)	21.69	Othman Essabi (LBA)	21.70
400 metres	Abbas Al-Aibi (IRQ)	46.83	Mohamed Abdeljabbar (IRQ)	47.62	Mehdi Ahmed Salah (LBA)	47.92
800 metres	Falah Naji Jarallah (IRQ)	1:48.51	Abbas Al-Aibi (IRQ)	1:49.27	Salem Mohamed Salem (LBA)	1:49.61
1500 metres	Falah Naji Jarallah (IRQ)	3:48.71	Mansour Guettaya (TUN)	3:40.01	Mohamed Néji Henchiri (TUN)	3:40.05
5000 metres	Mansour Guettaya (TUN)	14:27.42	Ali Gammoudi (TUN)	14:28.78	Mofleh Saad Messaoud (QAT)	15:14.32
10,000 metres	Abdelkader Zaddem (TUN)	30:28.51	Houcine Makni (TUN)	30:30.25	Mofleh Saad Messaoud (QAT)	31:42.99
110 metres hurdles	Fahan Sultan Nasir (IRQ)	14.64	Abdul Jabbar Rahima (IRQ)	14.78	Matar Achour (KUW)	15.42
400 metres hurdles	Talib Faisal Al-Saffar (IRQ)	50.72	Mohamed Najm (IRQ)	52.86	Kamil El Abbassi (KSA)	53.73
3000 metres steeplechase	Samir Mustapha (SYR)	9:28.88	Sabir Hantoush (IRQ)	9:41.32	Abdelkarim Jomâa (SYR)	9:56.16
4 × 100 m relay	Iraq (IRQ)	41.07	Kuwait (KUW)	41.50	Saudi Arabia (KSA)	42.17
4 × 400 m relay	Iraq (IRQ)	3:09.76	Saudi Arabia (KSA)	3:12.39	Libya (LBA)	3:15.1
Marathon	Shakbawi Al-Bashi (KSA)	2:36:44	Akl Hamdane (SYR)	2:39:58	Nader El Outaïbi (KSA)	2:46:15
High jump	Hussein Ali Hussein (IRQ)	2.00 m	Dib Essaleh (SYR)	1.95 m	Kamel Chaïeb (TUN)	1.90 m
Pole vault	Rihan Ali Rihan Obeid (KSA)	4.40 m	Abdallah Awadh (KSA)	4.00 m	Alaa Eddine Salanky (SYR)	3.80 m
Long jump	Youssef Khemiri (TUN)	7.31 m	Hussein Dawood (IRQ)	7.22 m	Khaled Methanni (TUN)	7.21 m
Triple jump	Hussein Dawood (IRQ)	14.98 m	Taoufik Talmined (SYR)	14.82 m	Nader Jarrah (SYR)	14.57 m
Shot put	Mohammed Al-Zinkawi (KUW)	16.82 m	Armous Al-Majiri (LBA)	16.46 m	Adnan Houry (SYR)	15.15 m
Discus throw	Abderrazak Ben Hassine (TUN)	48.12 m	Adnan Houry (SYR)	45.22 m	Mohammed Al-Zinkawi (KUW)	43.14 m
Hammer throw	Youssef Ben Abid (TUN)	53.30 m	Kadhem Ali Alouane (TUN)	46.24 m	Khaled Ghalloum (KUW)	43.96 m
Javelin throw	Abdel Rahman El Houry (SYR)	69.40 m	Tarek Chaabani (TUN)	69.14 m	Ali Memmi (TUN)	68.38 m
Decathlon	Elie Sfeir (LIB)	6453 pts	Zakaria Younes (SYR)	6295 pts	Foued Touir (SYR)	6017 pts

== Medal table ==
Rank	Nation	Gold	Silver	Bronze	Total
1	Iraq (IRQ)	11	9	0	20
2	Tunisia (TUN)	5	4	4	13
3	Syria	2	5	5	12
4	Saudi Arabia (KSA)	2	2	3	7
5	Kuwait (KUW)	1	1	3	5
6	Lebanon (LIB)	1	0	0	1
7	Libya (LBA)	0	1	4	5
8	Qatar (QAT)	0	0	3	3
Totals (8 entries)		22	22	22	66
