= Brobby =

Brobby is a surname. Notable people with the surname include:

- Bright Wireko-Brobby (born 1972), Ghanaian politician
- Charles Wereko-Brobby (born 1953), Ghanaian engineer, politician, diplomat and businessman
- Rex Brobby (born 1958), Ghanaian sprinter

== See also ==
- Bobby (surname)
- Brobbey
