= Francis Kwame Nyarko =

Ghanaian politician

Francis Kwame Nyarko is a Ghanaian politician. He served for Kade constituency in the Eastern Region of Ghana.

== Politics ==
Nyarko is a member of the 2nd parliament of the 4th republic of Ghana who took seat during the 1996 Ghanaian general election. He served for the New Patriotic Party after he defeated John Darlington Brobbey of National Democratic Congress with 19,616 votes cast. He was succeeded by Ofosu Asamoah of New Patriotic Party during the 2000 Ghanaian general election.
