= Nabil Nahri =

Syrian sprinter (born 1958)

Personal information
- Nationality: Syrian
- Born: 10 June 1958 (age 68) Damascus, United Arab Republic

Sport
- Country: Syria
- Sport: Athletics
- Events: 60 m, 100 m, 200 m
Medal record
Men's athletics
Representing Syria
Arab Championships
Gold medal – first place	1979 Baghdad	100 m
Silver medal – second place	1979 Baghdad	200 m
Silver medal – second place	1979 Baghdad	4×100 relay

Nabil Nahri (Arabic: نبيل نهري; born 10 June 1958) is a former athlete and best Syrian sprinter of all time. He competed in the men's 100 metres and men's 200 metres at the 1980 Summer Olympics.

In the qualifying 100 m run, he took fifth place in his race (10.67 s), but did not advance to the further part of the competition (34th out of 65 sprinters). It was similar in the 200 m race, Nahri achieved fifth result in the heat (22.14 s) and did not qualify for the next round (40th out of 57 runners).

Two-time individual medalist at the 1979 Arab Athletics Championships, won gold in the 100 m and two silver in the 200 m and 4×100 m. Participated at the 1985 World Indoor Championships but was eliminated in the 60 and 200 metres heats.

== Personal bests ==
Outdoor

- 100 m – 10.4 wind (Baghdad 1980)
- 100 m – 10.67 NR (Moscow 1980)
- 200 m – 21.45 NR (Baghdad 1979)

Indoor

- 60 m indoor – 7.07 (Paris 1985)
- 200 m indoor – 23.47 (Paris 1985)
- 400m – 48.8 (Damascus 1978)

== Competition record ==
Year	Competition	Venue	Position	Event	Notes
Representing Syria
1979	Mediterranean Games	Split, Yugoslavia	11th	100 m	10.82
1979	Mediterranean Games	Split, Yugoslavia	6th	200 m	21.52
1979	Arab Championships	Baghdad, Iraq	1st	100 m	10.97
1979	Arab Championships	Baghdad, Iraq	2nd	200 m	21.45
1979	Arab Championships	Baghdad, Iraq	2nd	4×100 m relay	41.90
1980	Olympic Games	Moscow, Soviet Union	34th (q)	100 m	10.67
1980	Olympic Games	Moscow, Soviet Union	40th (q)	200 m	22.14
1982	Asian Games	New Delhi, India	18th (q)	100 m	10.96
1985	World Indoor Championships	Paris, France	27th (q)	60 m	7.07
1985	World Indoor Championships	Paris, France	20th (q)	200 m	23.47
