= Vichan Choocherd =

Thai sprinter

Personal information
- Nationality: Thai
- Born: 9 September 1966 (age 59)

Sport
- Sport: Sprinting
- Event: 4 × 100 metres relay

Vichan Choocherd (born 9 September 1966) is a Thai sprinter. He competed in the men's 4 × 100 metres relay at the 1984 Summer Olympics.
