= Ibrahima Fall (athlete) =

Senegalese sprinter

Personal information
- Nationality: Senegalese
- Born: 4 December 1955 (age 70)

Sport
- Sport: Sprinting
- Event: 4 × 100 metres relay
Medal record
Men's athletics
Representing Senegal
African Championships
Bronze medal – third place	1984 Rabat	4×100 m

Ibrahima Fall (born 4 December 1955) is a Senegalese sprinter. He competed in the men's 4 × 100 metres relay at the 1984 Summer Olympics.
