= Khaled Khalifa Al-Shammari =

Kuwaiti middle-distance runner

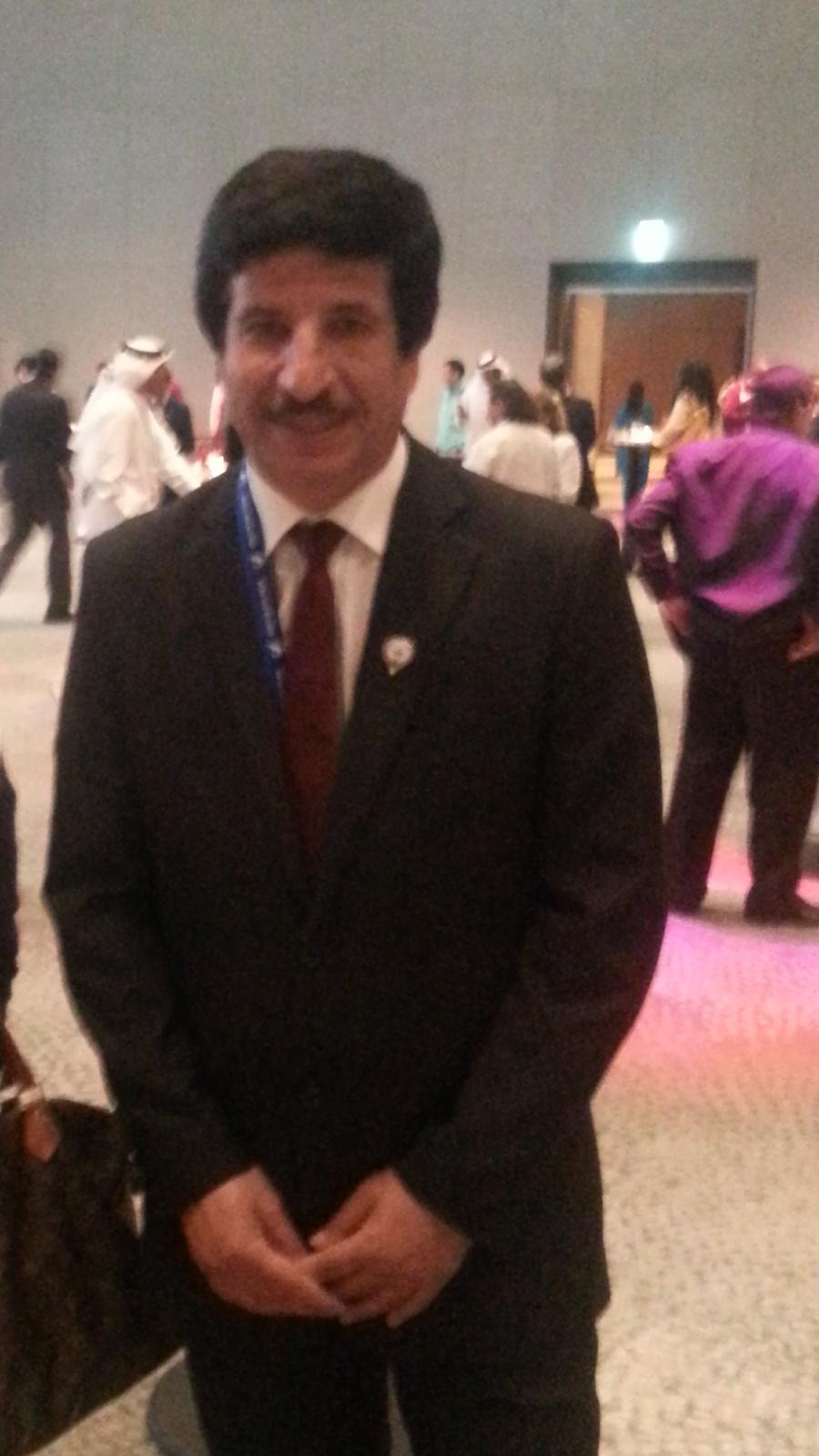
- Khalid khalifa

Personal information
- Nationality: Kuwaiti
- Born: 3 December 1957 Kuwait City
- Died: March 16, 2022 (aged 65) Thailand
- Height: 186 cm (6 ft 1 in)
- Weight: 68 kg (150 lb)

Sport
- Country: Kuwait
- Sport: Middle-distance running
Medal record
Men's athletics
Representing Kuwait
Arab Championships
Gold medal – first place	1979 Baghdad	1500 m
Silver medal – second place	1979 Baghdad	800 m
Asian Championships
Silver medal – second place	1981 Tokyo	800 m
Silver medal – second place	1983 Kuwait City	800 m

Khaled Khalifa Al-Shammari (Arabic: خالد خليفة الشمري; 3 December 1957 – 16 March 2022), also known as Khaled Khalifa, was a Kuwaiti Olympic middle-distance runner. He represented his country in the men's 1500 meters at the 1980 Summer Olympics.

== Career ==
Khalifa began his athletic career as a goalkeeper for the Khaitan SC team in 1972. He would go on to win 38 national and international medals in athletics.

Khalifa earned his first international medals at the 1979 Arab Athletics Championships. He won the 800 m silver medal and 1500 m gold medal, running times of 1:53.98 and 3:58.4 respectively.

Khalifa was seeded in the first 1500 m heat at the 1980 Olympics. He ran 3:57.55 seconds to place 8th, failing to qualify for the semi-finals. Khalifa was also entered on the Kuwaiti Olympic × 400 m team, but he did not start that race.

At the 1981 Asian Athletics Championships in Tokyo, Khalifa won the 800 m silver medal. His time of 1:50.37 was only behind Abraham Rajan of India, and Khalifa's 1981 medal was called the most famous of his career performances.

In August 1983, Khalifa qualified for the inaugural 1983 World Championships in Athletics in Helsinki. He finished 7th in his qualifying 800 m heat, running 1:52.84, and he failed to advance to the semi-finals. Later that year at the 1983 Asian Athletics Championships, Khalifa won the silver medal again running 1:49.97.

Two years later, Khalifa represented Kuwait at the 1985 IAAF World Indoor Games, the first global indoor athletics championships. In the 800 m, he placed 6th in his semi-final and did not qualify for the finals.

== Personal life ==
After retirement from competitive athletics, Khalifa worked as an athletics coach. He then worked his way from member to secretary general of the Kuwait Amateur Athletic Federation and was a member of the Kuwait Olympic Committee.

He died on 16 March 2022. His image was included on the logo for the 2022 Asian U18 Athletics Championships to commemorate his death.
