= Hala El-Moughrabi =

Syrian athlete

Personal information
- Native name: هاله المغربي
- Nationality: Syrian
- Born: June 6, 1959 (age 67) Damascus, UAR

Sport
- Country: Syria
- Sport: Athletics
- Events: 400 m, 800 m, 1500 m
Medal record
Women's athletics
Representing Syria
Mediterranean Games
Bronze medal – third place	1987 Latakia	4×400 relay
Arab Championships
Silver medal – second place	1979 Baghdad	800 m
Silver medal – second place	1983 Amman	3000 m
Bronze medal – third place	1979 Baghdad	400 m
Bronze medal – third place	1983 Amman	1500 m
Bronze medal – third place	1987 Algiers	800 m
- Updated on 20 December 2022

Hala El-Moughrabi (Arabic: هاله المغربي; born June 6, 1959) is a Syrian retired olympic sprinter and athlete. She represented Syria in 1980 Summer Olympics in Moscow. She was also a multiple silver and bronze medalist at the Arab Athletics Championships and a bronze medalist in the 4 × 400 m relay at the 1987 Mediterranean Games.

== Personal bests ==
- 400 m – 59.33 (Moscow 1980)
- 800 m – 2:10.3 h NR (Damascus 1987)
- 1500 m – 4:45.62 (Helsinki 1983)

== Competition record ==
Year	Competition	Venue	Position	Event	Notes
Representing Syria
1979	Arab Championships	Baghdad, Iraq	2nd	800 m	2:16.62
1979	Arab Championships	Baghdad, Iraq	3rd	400 m	59.94
1983	Arab Championships	Amman, Jordan	2nd	3000 m	10:40.64
1983	Arab Championships	Amman, Jordan	3rd	1500 m	4:45.74
1983	World Championships	Helsinki, Finland	DNS (qf)	400 m	59.58
1983	World Championships	Helsinki, Finland	17th (q)	800 m	2:15.37
1983	World Championships	Helsinki, Finland	20th (q)	1500 m	4:45.62
1987	Arab Championships	Algiers, Algeria	3rd	800 m	2:12.60
1987	Mediterranean Games	Latakia, Syria	8th	200 m	24.90
1987	Mediterranean Games	Latakia, Syria	4th	400 m	55.39
1987	Mediterranean Games	Latakia, Syria	5th	4 × 100 m relay	48.87
1987	Mediterranean Games	Latakia, Syria	3rd	4 × 400 m relay	4:01.35

== Olympic participation ==
=== Moscow 1980 ===
Hala El-Mogharabi and Dia Toutingi were the only female participants for Syria in that tournament among a total of 67 participants of Syria.

Athletics – Track events

Athlete	Event	Qualification		Quarterfinal		Semifinal		Final	
Athlete	Event	Result	Position	Result	Position	Result	Position	Result	Position
Hala El-Moughrabi (SYR)	400 m	59.33	6	did not advance					
Hala El-Moughrabi (SYR)	800 m	2:17.59	6	did not advance					
