= 1983 Arab Athletics Championships =

4th Arab Athletics Championships
- Dates: 19–22 August
- Host city: Amman, Jordan
- Events: 39

The 1983 Arab Athletics Championships was the fourth edition of the international athletics competition between Arab countries. It took place in Amman, Jordan from 19–22 August. A total of 39 athletics events were contested, 23 for men and 16 for women. The men's 20 kilometres walk was dropped from the programme, having been initiated at the 1981 edition. Although the majority of the races were measured using fully automatic time systems, four track finals were only timed to the tenth of a second due to technical issues.

== Medal summary ==
=== Men ===
Event	Gold		Silver		Bronze	
100 metres (wind: +2.5 m/s)	Jamal Sulaiman (QAT)	10.33w	Haytham Yagoub (IRQ)	10.44w	Ali Bakhta (ALG)	10.55w
200 metres	Ali Bakhta (ALG)	21.11	Jamal Sulaiman (QAT)	21.16	Hassen Ali Lafta (IRQ)	21.74
400 metres	Aouf Abdulrahman Yousef (IRQ)	47.29	Mohamed Aïssaoui (ALG)	47.51	Habib Dhouibi (TUN)	48.16
800 metres	Mohamed Alouini (TUN)	1:51.68	Omer Khalifa (SUD)	1:51.72	Saïd Ouakli (ALG)	1:51.88
1500 metres	Mohamed Néji Henchiri (TUN)	3:52.91	Omer Khalifa (SUD)	3:52.95	Abderrahmane Morceli (ALG)	3:53.66
5000 metres	Féthi Baccouche (TUN)	14:20.83	Abderrazak Bounour (ALG)	14:22.55	Mohamed Néji Henchiri (TUN)	14:23.23
10,000 metres	Féthi Baccouche (TUN)	29:58.4	Ahmed Musa Jouda (SUD)	29:59.3	Mohamed Ali Chouri (TUN)	30:03.5
110 metres hurdles	Ahmed Hamada Jassim (BHR)	14.2	Riad Benhaddad (ALG)	14.5	Mansour Salem (KSA)	14.6
400 metres hurdles	Ahmed Hamada Jassim (BHR)	51.68	Hassen El Assadi (IRQ)	52.24	Khalifa Khémiri (TUN)	52.63
3000 metres steeplechase	Féthi Baccouche (TUN)	8:54.9	Mohamed Ali Chouri (TUN)	8:55.9	Rabah Aboura (ALG)	9:27.7
4 × 100 m relay	Qatar (QAT)	40.67	Iraq (IRQ)	41.01	Kuwait (KUW)	41.08
4 × 400 m relay	Iraq (IRQ)	3:11.44	Algeria (ALG)	3:12.75	Tunisia (TUN)	3:17.22
Marathon	Saadoun Nasir (IRQ)	2:38:15	Omar Moussa Bouh (DJI)	2:44:39	Abdelaziz Bouguerra (TUN)	2:44:52
20 km walk	Abdelmajid Messifi (ALG)	1:48:16	Mohamed Bouhalla (ALG)	1:51:39	Amjad Taoualba (LBA)	2:02:16
High jump	Othmane Belfaa (ALG)	2.28 m	Mohamed Aghlal (MAR)	2.16 m	Abdulla Al-Sheib (QAT)	2.10 m
Pole vault	Mohamed Bensaad (ALG)	4.60 m	Choukri Abahnini (TUN)	4.50 m	Mohamed Bouihiri (MAR)	4.40 m
Long jump	Walid Turki (IRQ)	7.36 m	Bachir Messikh (ALG)	7.35 m	Ahmed Benazoug (ALG)	7.25 m
Triple jump	Fethi Khelid Aboud (LBA)	15.89 m	Saïd Saad (ALG)	15.72 m	Moujhed Fahd Khalifa (IRQ)	15.51 m
Shot put	Mohammed Al-Zinkawi (KUW)	17.36 m	Mohamed Fatihi (MAR)	16.73 m	Mahmoud Abel (KUW)	16.34 m
Discus throw	Abderrazak Ben Hassine (TUN)	53.36 m	Shawki Hajji (IRQ)	48.90 m	Adnan Houry (SYR)	48.40 m
Hammer throw	Hakim Toumi (ALG)	66.34 m	Yacine Louail (ALG)	64.94 m	Khaled Ghalloum (KUW)	53.48 m
Javelin throw	Tarek Chaabani (TUN)	70.30 m	Mohamed Karakhi (MAR)	68.58 m	Malong Garang (SUD)	64.82 m
Decathlon	Mourad Mahour Bacha (ALG)	6893 pts	Adel El-Charida (BHR)	6857 pts	Abdessatar Mouelhi (TUN)	6695 pts

=== Women ===
Event	Gold		Silver		Bronze	
100 metres	Rachida Ferdjaoui (ALG)	12.16	Fatima Mefti (ALG)	12.52	Intissar El Khaffaji (IRQ)	12.65
200 metres	Rachida Ferdjaoui (ALG)	25.14	Selma Anane (TUN)	25.74	Souad Chouider (ALG)	25.79
400 metres	Sarra Touibi (TUN)	56.3	Dalila Harek (ALG)	57.6	Wissal Mahmoud (IRQ)	1:00.1
800 metres	Sarra Touibi (TUN)	2:09.5	Dalila Harek (ALG)	2:11.41	Sabah Ben Nasr (TUN)	2:12.24
1500 metres	Sabah Ben Nasr (TUN)	4:34.92	Salima Djelloul (ALG)	4:40.37	Hala El-Moughrabi (SYR)	4:45.74
3000 metres	Sabah Ben Nasr (TUN)	10:31.51	Hala El-Moughrabi (SYR)	10:40.64	Emna Aouda (JOR)	10:46.19
100 metres hurdles	Karima Henni (ALG)	15.01	Basma Gharbi (TUN)	15.19	Kawther Akrémi (TUN)	15.58
400 metres hurdles	Basma Gharbi (TUN)	1:03.63	Karima Henni (ALG)	1:06.84	Rana Fodha (JOR)	1:14.68
4 × 100 m relay	Algeria (ALG)	47.65	Tunisia (TUN)	48.89	Iraq (IRQ)	49.02
4 × 400 m relay	Morocco (MAR)	3:49.66	Tunisia (TUN)	3:49.76	Iraq (IRQ)	4:04.32
High jump	Kawther Akrémi (TUN)	1.71 m	Nacera Zaaboub-Achir (ALG)	1.65 m	Mbarka Ahnitou (MAR)	1.60 m
Long jump	Dalila Tayebi (ALG)	5.92 m	Kawther Akrémi (TUN)	5.81 m	Basma Gharbi (TUN)	5.62 m
Shot put	Souad Malloussi (MAR)	15.47 m	Aïcha Dahmous (ALG)	13.65 m	Fatiha Larab (ALG)	13.22 m
Discus throw	Zoubida Laayouni (MAR)	47.84 m	Aïcha Dahmous (ALG)	42.84 m	Djamila Aït Dib (ALG)	41.16 m
Javelin throw	Fatiha Belamghar (MAR)	46.04 m	Samia Djémaa (ALG)	44.03 m	Nouria Kédideh (ALG)	42.18 m
Heptathlon	Nacera Zaaboub-Achir (ALG)	5075 pts	Zeina Mina (LIB)	4577 pts	Rana Fodha (JOR)	2887 pts

== Medal table ==
=== Overall ===
Rank	Nation	Gold	Silver	Bronze	Total
1	Algeria (ALG)	13	17	9	39
2	Tunisia (TUN)	13	7	10	30
3	Iraq (IRQ)	4	4	6	14
4	Morocco (MAR)	3	3	2	8
5	Qatar (QAT)	2	1	1	4
6	Bahrain (BHR)	2	1	0	3
7	Kuwait (KUW)	1	0	3	4
8	Libya (LBA)	1	0	0	1
9	Sudan (SUD)	0	3	1	4
10	Syria	0	1	2	3
11	Djibouti (DJI)	0	1	0	1
11	Lebanon (LIB)	0	1	0	1
13	Jordan (JOR)	0	0	4	4
14	Saudi Arabia (KSA)	0	0	1	1
15	Oman (OMN)	0	0	0	0
15	Palestine (PLE)	0	0	0	0
15	South Yemen (YMD)	0	0	0	0
15	United Arab Emirates (UAE)	0	0	0	0
Totals (18 entries)		39	39	39	117

=== Men ===
Rank	Nation	Gold	Silver	Bronze	Total
1	Tunisia (TUN)	7	2	7	16
2	Algeria (ALG)	6	8	5	19
3	Iraq (IRQ)	4	4	2	10
4	Qatar (QAT)	2	1	1	4
5	Bahrain (BHR)	2	1	0	3
6	Kuwait (KUW)	1	0	3	4
7	Libya (LBA)	1	0	0	1
8	Morocco (MAR)	0	3	1	4
8	Sudan (SUD)	0	3	1	4
10	Djibouti (DJI)	0	1	0	1
11	Jordan (JOR)	0	0	1	1
11	Saudi Arabia (KSA)	0	0	1	1
11	Syria	0	0	1	1
14	Lebanon (LIB)	0	0	0	0
14	Oman (OMN)	0	0	0	0
14	Palestine (PLE)	0	0	0	0
14	South Yemen (YMD)	0	0	0	0
14	United Arab Emirates (UAE)	0	0	0	0
Totals (18 entries)		23	23	23	69

=== Women ===
Rank	Nation	Gold	Silver	Bronze	Total
1	Algeria (ALG)	7	9	4	20
2	Tunisia (TUN)	6	5	3	14
3	Morocco (MAR)	3	0	1	4
4	Syria	0	1	1	2
5	Lebanon (LIB)	0	1	0	1
6	Iraq (IRQ)	0	0	4	4
7	Jordan (JOR)	0	0	3	3
8	Palestine (PLE)	0	0	0	0
Totals (8 entries)		16	16	16	48
