= Makarios Djan =

Ghanaian sprinter (1955–2026)

Personal information
- Nationality: Ghanaian
- Born: 3 June 1955
- Died: 24 March 2026 (aged 70)

Sport
- Sport: Sprinting
- Event: 4 × 100 metres relay

Makarios Djan (3 June 1955 – 24 March 2026) was a Ghanaian sprinter. He competed in the men's 4 × 100 metres relay at the 1984 Summer Olympics. Djan died on 24 March 2026, at the age of 70.
