= Kwaku Bugyei Ntim =

Ghanaian politician

Member of the Ghana Parliament for Kade
- In office 1969–1972
- President: Kofi Abrefa Busia

Personal details
- Born: 14 May 1909 Kade, Eastern Region, Gold Coast
- Education: Mfantsipim School

Kwaku Bugyei Ntim is a Ghanaian politician and was a member of the first parliament of the second Republic of Ghana. He represented the Kade constituency under the membership of the Progress Party (PP).

== Early life and education ==
Ntim was born on 14 May 1909 in the Eastern region of Ghana. He attended Wesleyan Mission School now Mfantsipim School, Cape Coast, Ghana where he obtained his Teachers' Training Certificate. He then proceeded to Chartered Institute of Secretaries where he obtained his Certificate in Secretaryship. He thereafter traveled to London to advance his education at London Chamber of Commerce where he obtained his Commercial Education Certificate. He was an Accountant and Secretary in many organizations before going into parliament.

== Politics ==
Ntim began his political career in 1969 when he became the parliamentary candidate for the Progress Party (PP) to represent the Kade constituency before the commencement of the 1969 Ghanaian parliamentary election. He assumed office as a member of the first parliament of the second Republic of Ghana on 1 October 1969 after being a pronounced winner at the 1969 Ghanaian parliamentary election. His tenure ended on 13 January 1972.

== Personal life ==
Ntim is a Christian.
