= Al Lawrence (sprinter) =

Jamaican sprinter (born 1961)

Personal information
- Full name: Albert Lawrence
- Born: 26 April 1961 (age 65) Jamaica
Medal record
Men's athletics
Representing Jamaica
Olympic Games
Silver medal – second place	1984 Los Angeles	4×100m relay
CARIFTA Games Junior (U20)
Gold medal – first place	1979 Kingston	4×100m relay

Albert "Al" Lawrence (born 26 April 1961) is a Jamaican former track and field athlete. He won a silver medal in the 1984 Olympic 4 × 100 m with the Jamaican team that consisted of Greg Meghoo, Don Quarrie and Ray Stewart.

Competing as a foreign guest, Lawrence won the 1985 USA Indoor Track and Field Championships while being sponsored by Bud Light.
