= Thomas Jefferson (sprinter) =

American former sprinter (born 1962)

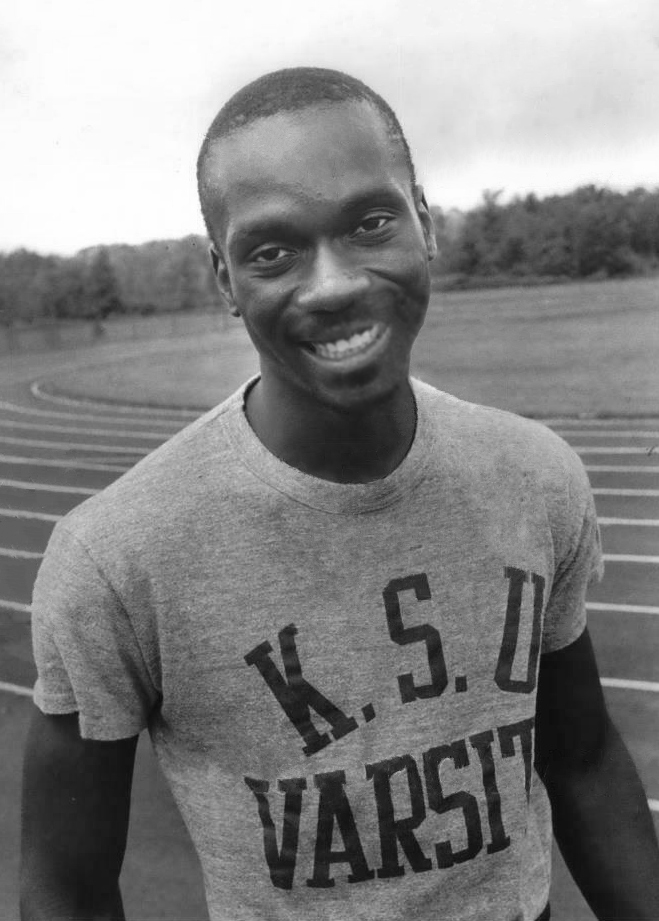
- Jefferson in 1984

Personal information
- Full name: Thomas Theodore Jefferson
- Born: June 8, 1962 (age 64) Cleveland, Ohio, U.S.
- Education: Kent State University

Sport
- Sport: Athletics
- Events: 100 m, 200 m
- Club: Kent State Golden Flashes

Achievements and titles
- Personal bests: 100 m – 10.17 (1986); 200 m – 20.21 (1991)
Medal record
Representing United States
Olympic Games
Bronze medal – third place	1984 Los Angeles	200 m
Summer Universiade
Bronze medal – third place	1985 Kobe	4x100 m relay

Thomas Theodore Jefferson (born June 8, 1962) is an American former sprinter. He won a bronze medal in the 200 m at the 1984 Summer Olympics. Jefferson also won a bronze medal in the 4×100 m relay at the 1985 Summer Universiade and placed fourth in the 200 m at the 1991 World Indoors Championships. He was ranked #3 in the world over 200 m in 1984.

May 1985, Won Mid-american Conference (MAC) Championship in the 100 and 200 meter dash.

Selected to Kent State University Hall of Fame in 1992.
