= Sam Graddy =

American football player (born 1964)

No. 83, 85
- Position: Wide receiver

Personal information
- Born: February 10, 1964 (age 62); Gaffney, South Carolina, U.S.
- Listed height: 5 ft 10 in (1.78 m)
- Listed weight: 175 lb (79 kg)

Career information
- High school: Northside
- College: Tennessee
- NFL draft: 1987: undrafted

Career history
- Denver Broncos (1987–1988); Los Angeles Raiders (1989–1992)

Career NFL statistics
- Receptions: 18
- Receiving yards: 477
- Touchdowns: 3
- Stats at Pro Football Reference

Samuel Louis Graddy III (born February 10, 1964) is an American former athlete and professional football player, winner of gold medal in 4 × 100 m relay at the 1984 Summer Olympics. He played in the National Football League (NFL) as a wide receiver.

== Early life ==
Born in Gaffney, South Carolina, Sam Graddy was second in the 100 m and was a member of gold medal-winning American 4 × 100 m relay team at the 1983 Pan American Games.

== Track and field ==
Medal record

Men's track and field

Representing the United States

Olympic Games
Gold medal – first place	1984 Los Angeles	4 × 100 metres relay
Silver medal – second place	1984 Los Angeles	100 metres

Pan American Games
Gold medal – first place	1983 Caracas	4 × 100 metres relay
Silver medal – second place	1983 Caracas	100 metres

World Indoor Championships
Silver medal – second place	1985 Paris	60 metres

Summer Universiade
Gold medal – first place	1983 Edmonton	4x100 metres relay
Bronze medal – third place	1983 Edmonton	100 metres

Graddy was also a standout track athlete. In 1984, he won the gold medal at the 1984 USA Outdoor Track and Field Championships in the 100 meters with a time of 10.28 seconds, and as a University of Tennessee at Knoxville student, he also won the 100 meters title at the 1984 NCAA Division I Outdoor Track and Field Championships.

At the Los Angeles Olympics, Graddy was second behind Carl Lewis in 100 m and ran the first leg in the American 4 × 100 metres relay team, which won the gold medal with a new world record of 37.83 seconds.

=== Personal bests ===
Event	Time (seconds)	Venue	Date
60 meters	6.63	Paris, France	January 1, 1985
100 meters	10.09	Baton Rouge, Louisiana	May 12, 1984
200 meters	20.30	Knoxville, Tennessee	May 10, 1985

== Professional career ==
After graduating from university of Tennessee, Graddy was signed by the Denver Broncos in 1987. He played in Denver during the 1987 and 1988 seasons catching one pass for 30 yards. After being out of football for the 1989 season, he signed with the Los Angeles Raiders where he played from 1990 to 1992. During his Raider career Graddy was plagued with dropped passes therefore moved down the depth chart and mainly limited to kick return duty. His career highlight was in 1991 when he caught an 80-yard touchdown pass against the Houston Oilers. Graddy ended his career with 18 catches, 477 yards, 26.5 average per reception and 3 touchdowns. He also returned 27 kicks for 458 yards.
