= Saliou Seck =

Senegalese sprinter

Personal information
- Nationality: Senegalese
- Born: 15 December 1955 (age 70)

Sport
- Sport: Sprinting
- Event: 4 × 100 metres relay

Saliou Seck (born 15 December 1955) is a Senegalese sprinter. He competed in the men's 4 × 100 metres relay at the 1984 Summer Olympics.
