= Vicente Daniel =

Mozambican sprinter

Personal information
- Nationality: Mozambican
- Born: 23 May 1956 (age 70)

Sport
- Sport: Sprinting
- Event: 100 metres

Vicente Hibrahim Daniel (born 23 May 1956) is a Mozambican former sprinter. He competed in the men's 100 metres at the 1984 Summer Olympics.
