= Prasit Boonprasert =

Thai sprinter (born 1956)

Personal information
- Nationality: Thai
- Born: 7 August 1956 (age 69)

Sport
- Sport: Sprinting
- Event: 4 × 100 metres relay
Medal record
Men's athletics
Representing Thailand
Asian Championships
| Silver medal – second place | 1973 Marikina | 4×100 m |
| Silver medal – second place | 1979 Tokyo | 4×100 m |
| Silver medal – second place | 1983 Kuwait City | 4×100 m |

Prasit Boonprasert (born 7 August 1956) is a Thai sprinter. He competed in the men's 4 × 100 metres relay at the 1984 Summer Olympics.
