= Barnabé Messomo =

Cameroonian sprinter

Personal information
- Nationality: Cameroonian
- Born: 26 August 1956 (age 69)

Sport
- Sport: Sprinting
- Event: 100 metres

Barnabé Messomo (born 26 August 1956) is a Cameroonian sprinter. He competed in the men's 100 metres at the 1984 Summer Olympics.
