= Sarra Touibi =

Tunisian runner

Personal information
- Born: 30 January 1959 (age 67)

Sport
- Sport: Track and field

Sarra Touibi (born 30 January 1959) is a retired Tunisian runner who saw success on continental level.

At the Arab Athletics Championships she won four gold medals; the 200 and 400 metres in 1979 and the 400 and 800 metres in 1983. She also won the 400 metres at the 1975 Maghreb Championships.

At the 1981 Arab Championships she won a silver medal in the 400 metres, likewise at the 1981 Maghreb Championships. She won two bronze medals at the 1983 Maghreb Championships, in the 400 and 800 metres. She also finished a distant fourth in the 400 metres at the 1979 Mediterranean Games and sixth in the 800 metres at the 1983 Mediterranean Games.

She became Tunisian double champion in the 400 and 800 metres in 1982, 1983 and 1986.
