= Lightbournus russjenseni =

Scientific classification
- Kingdom: Animalia
- Phylum: Mollusca
- Class: Gastropoda
- Subclass: Caenogastropoda
- Order: Neogastropoda
- Family: Fasciolariidae
- Genus: Lightbournus
- Species: L. russjenseni

Binomial name
- Lightbournus russjenseni Lyons & Snyder, 2008

Species of gastropod

Lightbournus russjenseni is a species of sea snail, a marine gastropod mollusk in the family Fasciolariidae, the spindle snails, the tulip snails and their allies.
