= James Idun =

Ghanaian sprinter

Personal information
- Nationality: Ghanaian
- Born: 23 April 1963 (age 63)

Sport
- Sport: Sprinting
- Event: 200 metres

James W. Idun (born 23 April 1963) is a Ghanaian sprinter. He competed in the men's 200 metres at the 1984 Summer Olympics.

== Career ==
Idun attended the University of Nevada at Reno, where he competed for the Nevada Wolf Pack track and field team. He qualified for the 1980 Summer Olympics, but could not go due to Ghana's 1980 Summer Olympics boycott.

In 1983, Idun set a Nevada school record in the 800-meter sprint medley relay that still stands as of 2021. Despite this, he lost his scholarship after failing to score at the 1983 Big Sky Conference track and field championships. Idun was surprised that his scholarship could be based on one meet, and pleaded to his coach Jack Cook to earn it back saying that he was suffering from a "mental, psychological block" and was "scared of [his] own coach".

His parents were not able to support him financially, but he was able to raise money from his community to pay for his tuition for one semester. Cook gave Idun two meals per day and was eventually able to restore Idun's scholarship. The following year, he was 3rd in the 100 metres and 5th in the 200 metres at the Big Sky outdoor championships, scoring eight points.

Idun was one of three Nevada Wolf Pack track and field athletes on the 1984 roster to compete at the 1984 Summer Olympics, including Ghanan teammate Philip Attipoe and Domingo Tibaduiza for Colombia. At the Olympics, Idun ran 22.55 to place 7th in his heat and did not advance. At another meeting in 1984, Idun set his personal best time of 21.37 seconds.

In 1987, Idun ran for the Drexel Dragons track and field team. He won the 60 metres at the 1987 East Coast Conference indoor track and field championships.

== Personal life ==
Following his graduation from Drexel, Idun worked for SAP America as a system consultant.
