= Jürgen Koffler =

German sprinter

Personal information
- Nationality: German
- Born: 7 May 1960 (age 66) Karlsruhe, West Germany
- Height: 1.76 m (5 ft 9 in)

Sport
- Sport: Sprinting
- Event: 4 × 100 metres relay

Jürgen Koffler (born 7 May 1960) is a German sprinter.

He finished fifth in the men's 4 × 100 metres relay at the 1984 Summer Olympics representing West Germany. He finished eighth at the 1983 European Cup and competed in the 400 metres at the 1986 European Indoor Championships without reaching the final.

At the German Championships, Koffler won the bronze medal in the 100 metres in 1984. Representing the club SV Salamander Kornwestheim, he became German 4 × 100 metres relay champion with his club in 1981 and 1984. His personal best time in the 100 metres was 10.39 seconds, achieved in 1983.
