= Khaled Ghaloum =

Kuwaiti hammer thrower

Personal information
- Nationality: Kuwaiti
- Born: 18 January 1958
- Died: January 2022 (aged 63–64)

Sport
- Sport: Athletics
- Event: Hammer throw
Medal record
Men's athletics
Representing Kuwait
Arab Championships
Bronze medal – third place	1977 Damascus	Hammer throw
Silver medal – second place	1979 Baghdad	Hammer throw
Bronze medal – third place	1983 Amman	Hammer throw

Khaled Mourad Ghaloum (Arabic: خالد مراد غلوم; 18 January 1958 — January 2022) was a Kuwaiti athlete. He competed in the men's hammer throw at the 1980 Summer Olympics.

== Career ==
Ghaloum won his first international medal at the inaugural 1977 Arab Athletics Championships. With a throw of 43.96 metres, he won the bronze medal in the hammer throw.

Two years later at the 1979 Arab Athletics Championships in Baghdad, Ghaloum improved his position to the silver medal. His mark of 45.44 m was only behind Tunisia's Youssef Ben Abid.

Ghaloum was selected to represent Kuwait at the 1980 Summer Olympics in the hammer throw. In the qualifying round, he fouled his first attempt but then threw 47.40 m for his next throw. He threw the hammer 47.00 m on his final throw, leaving 47.40 m as his best mark placing him 17th overall.

Ghaloum returned at the 1983 Arab Athletics Championships in Jordan, winning another medal. His 53.48 m throw was his best Arab Championships mark, placing him 3rd for the bronze medal.

== Personal life ==
Ghaloum was born on 18 January 1958. Following his career as an athlete, he served as the Kuwaiti national athletics team coach. He died in January 2022.
