= Rangsam Intharachai =

Thai sprinter (born 1959)

Personal information
- Nationality: Thai
- Born: 1 August 1959 (age 66)

Sport
- Sport: Sprinting
- Event: 4 × 100 metres relay

Rangsam Intharachai (Note: Probably a misspelling; the correct name is more likely spelled Rangsan.) (Thai: รังสรรค์ อินทรชัย, born 1 August 1959) is a Thai sprinter. He competed in the men's 4 × 100 metres relay at the 1984 Summer Olympics.
