= Kgosiemang Khumoyarano =

Botswana sprinter

Personal information
- Nationality: Botswana
- Born: 23 July 1954 (age 71)

Sport
- Sport: Sprinting
- Event: 100 metres

Kgosiemang Khumoyarano (also spelled Khumoyarona; born 23 July 1954) is a Botswana sprinter. He competed in the men's 100 metres at the 1984 Summer Olympics.

At the Los Angeles Olympics, Khumoyarano ran 11.49 seconds into a headwind to finish 7th in his 100 m heat, failing to advance. His name was widely ridiculed by American media for its ability to serve as a tongue twister to American announcers. He was contrasted with South Korean sprinter Duk-Sup Sim in the same competition, who was said to have a simpler name. He was slated to compete in the Olympic 200 m as well, but did not start that event.

Khumoyarano was the second ever 100 m sprinter to represent Botswana at the Olympics after Lucien Josiah. He set his 100 metres personal best of 10.7 seconds in 1988 at another athletics meeting.
