= Jamal Al-Abdullah =

Qatari sprinter

Personal information
- Nationality: Qatari
- Born: 1963 (age 62–63)

Sport
- Sport: Sprinting
- Event: 200 metres
Medal record
Men's athletics
Representing Qatar
Asian Championships
Gold medal – first place	1987 Singapore	4×100 m
Silver medal – second place	1985 Jakarta	4×100 m

Jamal Al-Abdullah Sulaiman Sultan (born 1963) is a Qatari sprinter. He competed in the men's 200 metres at the 1984 Summer Olympics.
