= Mamadou Sène =

Senegalese sprinter

Personal information
- Nationality: Senegalese
- Born: 20 June 1960 (age 66)

Sport
- Sport: Sprinting
- Event: 4 × 100 metres relay
Medal record
Men's athletics
Representing Senegal
African Championships
Silver medal – second place	1982 Cairo	4×100 m
Bronze medal – third place	1984 Rabat	4×100 m

Mamadou Sène (born 20 June 1960) is a Senegalese former sprinter. He competed in the men's 4 × 100 metres relay at the 1984 Summer Olympics.
