= Julien Thode =

Dutch Antillean athlete

Personal information
- Nationality: Dutch Antillean
- Born: 11 September 1964 (age 61)
- Height: 1.79 m (5 ft 10 in)
- Weight: 72 kg (159 lb)

Sport
- Sport: Sprinting
- Event: 100 metres

Julien Thode (born 11 September 1964) is a sprinter who represented the Netherlands Antilles. He competed in the men's 100 metres at the 1984 Summer Olympics.
