= Norman Edwards =

Jamaican sprinter

Personal information
- Born: 24 September 1962 Jamaica
- Died: 11–12 July 2015 Washington D.C.

Sport
- Sport: Sprinting
- Event: 100 metres

Norman Edwards (24 September 1962 – 11–12 July 2015) was a Jamaican sprinter. He competed in the men's 100 metres at the 1984 Summer Olympics.
