= Ernawan Witarsa =

Indonesian sprinter

Personal information
- Nationality: Indonesian
- Born: 3 March 1966 (age 60)

Sport
- Sport: Sprinting
- Event: 4 × 100 metres relay

Ernawan Witarsa (born 3 March 1966) is an Indonesian sprinter. He competed in the men's 4 × 100 metres relay at the 1984 Summer Olympics.
