= Hamidou Diawara =

Senegalese sprinter (born 1960)

Personal information
- Nationality: Senegalese
- Born: 29 February 1960 (age 66)

Sport
- Sport: Sprinting
- Event: 4 × 100 metres relay
Medal record
Men's athletics
Representing Senegal
African Championships
Bronze medal – third place	1984 Rabat	4×100 m

Hamidou Diawara (born 29 February 1960) is a Senegalese sprinter. He competed in the men's 4 × 100 metres relay at the 1984 Summer Olympics.
