= Yu Zhuanghui =

Chinese sprinter (born 1962)

Personal information
- Nationality: Chinese
- Born: 余壯輝, Pinyin: Yú Zhuàng-huī; 12 April 1962 (age 64)

Sport
- Sport: Sprinting
- Event: 100 metres
Medal record
Men's athletics
Representing China
Asian Championships
Gold medal – first place	1983 Kuwait City	4×100 m
Gold medal – first place	1985 Jakarta	4×100 m

Yu Zhuanghui (born 12 April 1962) is a Chinese sprinter; he competed in the men's 100 metres at the 1984 Summer Olympics.
