= Aldo Salandra =

Salvadoran sprinter

Personal information
- Nationality: Salvadoran
- Born: 3 June 1958 (age 68)

Sport
- Sport: Sprinting
- Event: 100 metres

Aldo Salandra (born 3 June 1958) is a Salvadoran sprinter. He competed in the men's 100 metres at the 1984 Summer Olympics.
