= Lightbournus =

Scientific classification
- Kingdom: Animalia
- Phylum: Mollusca
- Class: Gastropoda
- Subclass: Caenogastropoda
- Order: Neogastropoda
- Family: Fasciolariidae
- Genus: Lightbournus; Lyons & Snyder, 2008

Genus of gastropods

Lightbournus is a genus of sea snails, marine gastropod mollusks in the family Fasciolariidae, the spindle snails, the tulip snails and their allies.

== Species ==
Species within the genus Lightbournus include:

- Lightbournus russjenseni Lyons & Snyder, 2008
