= Anthony Jones (sprinter) =

Barbadian sprinter

Personal information
- Nationality: Barbadian
- Born: 7 April 1955 (age 70)

Sport
- Sport: Sprinting
- Event: 100 metres

Anthony Jones (born 7 April 1955) is a Barbadian sprinter. He competed in the men's 100 metres at the 1984 Summer Olympics.
