= Collins Mensah =

Ghanaian sprinter

Personal information
- Nationality: Ghanaian
- Born: 19 February 1961 (age 65)

Sport
- Sport: Sprinting
- Event: 100 metres

Collins Mensah (born 19 February 1961) is a Ghanaian sprinter. He competed in the men's 100 metres at the 1984 Summer Olympics.
