= Rex Brobby =

Ghanaian sprinter (born 1958)

Personal information
- Nationality: Ghanaian
- Born: 21 February 1958 (age 68)

Sport
- Sport: Sprinting
- Event: 4 × 100 metres relay

Rex Brobby (born 21 February 1958) is a Ghanaian sprinter. He competed in the men's 4 × 100 metres relay at the 1984 Summer Olympics.
