= Nelson Erazo (athlete) =

Puerto Rican sprinter (1959–2017)

Personal information
- Full name: Nelson Erazo
- Nationality: Puerto Rican
- Born: 29 July 1959 Bayamón, Puerto Rico
- Died: 23 March 2017 Bayamón, Puerto Rico
- Height: 5 ft 9.5 in (177 cm)
- Weight: 159 lb (72 kg)

Sport
- Sport: Athletics
- Event(s): 100 metre, 200 metre

Nelson Erazo (29 July 1959 – 23 March 2017) was a male track and field athlete from Puerto Rico, who competed in the men's 100 metres and 200 metres during his career. He set his personal best (20.99 s) in the 200 m in 1984. Erazo represented Puerto Rico at the 1984 Summer Olympics, where he was eliminated in the first round (heat ten) of the men's 200 metres, clocking 21.72 s. After his retirement as an athlete, he taught at various public schools and private schools in the Toa Alta and Bayamón, as a Physical Education teacher.

== Public Schools and Private Schools where he worked ==
- Academia Cristiana Yarah, Toa Alta P.R.
- Escuela Superior Miguel De Cervantes Saavedra, Bayamón P.R.
