= Terry Scott (sprinter) =

American sprinter (born 1964)

Personal information
- Born: June 23, 1964 Kansas City, Missouri, United States
- Died: November 14, 2021 (aged 57) Kansas City, Missouri, United States

Sport
- Sport: Track and field
Medal record
Representing United States
Summer Universiade
Gold medal – first place	1983 Edmonton	4x100m relay

Terry Scott (June 23, 1964 – November 14, 2021) was an American sprinter. He was the NCAA champion in the 100 meters in 1985 for the University of Tennessee.
