= Gus Young (sprinter) =

Jamaican sprinter

Personal information
- Nationality: Jamaican
- Born: 19 September 1961 (age 64)

Sport
- Sport: Sprinting
- Event: 100 metres

Gus Young (born 19 September 1961) is a Jamaican sprinter. He competed in the men's 100 metres at the 1984 Summer Olympics.
