= Audrick Lightbourne =

Bahamian sprinter

Personal information
- Nationality: Bahamian
- Born: 17 May 1960 (age 66)

Sport
- Sport: Sprinting
- Event: 100 metres

Audrick Lightbourne (born 17 May 1960) is a Bahamian sprinter. He competed in the men's 100 metres at the 1984 Summer Olympics.
