= Wendell Lightbourne =

American serial killer

- Lightbourne (left) being escorted by authorities after arriving in the United Kingdom (c. 1960)
- Born: Wendell Willis Lightbourne; 1940 (age 85–86)
- Other names: "Donkey"; The Moon Mad Murderer
- Conviction: Murder
- Penalty: Death; commuted to life imprisonment

Details
- Victims: 3
- Span of crimes: July 19, 1958 – September 27, 1959
- Country: Bermuda
- State: Warwick Parish
- Date apprehended: October 31, 1959

Wendell Willis Lightbourne (born 1940), known as The Moon Mad Murderer, was a Bermudian serial killer who committed three rape-murders and the attempted murder of two others during a series of attacks that terrorized natives of the Warwick Parish area from July 1958 through September 1959, with most of the attacks involving mutilation to a degree. Although he was initially sentenced to hang, his sentence was commuted to life imprisonment.

== Attacks ==
=== July 19, 1958 ===
Lightbourne is believed to have assaulted 35-year-old Florence Lillian Flood in her backyard on July 19, 1958, by striking her with a wooden lawn mower. She was hospitalized for two weeks, and survived; she claimed the attacker might have been her husband Leonard, and he was arrested, but was released after being cleared of suspicion.

=== March 7, 1959 ===
Nine months later, Lightbourne attacked 72-year-old Gertrude Robinson outside her cottage in Warwick Parish on March 7, 1959. Robinson's neighbor William Kuhn discovered her later that day, nude, and badly beaten, but still clinging to life. Robinson was rushed to a hospital in Hamilton, where she died as a result of her injuries. At the crime scene, two sets of footprints were found in her yard which showed that Robinson had been chased down by her attacker. Some authorities speculated that the killer might have been the same person that had attacked Flood nine months prior, though others believed the attacks were unrelated and opted to investigate people in Robinson's life.

=== May 8, 1959 ===
Around mid-April, residents, who had been spurred by the murder, had started to forget about it. That was until May 8, when neighbors discovered 53-year-old Dorothy Pearce laying on her floor; Lightbourne had stripped and badly beaten her. She died shortly after she was found. In her bedroom, a male's fingerprint was found. At this point, with residential police sure that the killer had also killed Gertrude Robinson, Warwick Parish and surrounding areas were swept in a moral panic; residents and whole families armed themselves with guns, pocket knives, and axes, while others abandoned the area and went to temporally live somewhere else.

=== July 24, 1959 ===
On July 24, 53-year-old Rosaleen Kenny was just about to fall asleep in her home when Lightbourne forced himself in. He located Kenny, and started beating her; four others were in the home at the time and heard the commotion, which caused Lightbourne to flee the home. Kenny was injured, but survived. She described her attacker as a large black man, which was a breakthrough to police as they now knew what the killer looked like, who was then dubbed "The Moon Mad Murderer".

=== September 27, 1959 ===
The most infamous of all the attacks occurred on September 27, when the youngest victim 29-year-old vacationer Dorothy Barbara Rawlinson, who arrived in Bermuda in May, visited a beach off by the southlands. Sometime when she was taking a stroll, Lightbourne attacked her, stripped her of her clothes, and sexually assaulted her. He murdered her after the fact and threw her body into water. Once speculation about her disappearance was linked to the murders was overheard, skin divers were brought to the waters to possibly find her body, but it was not found until a craft crane crew discovered her mutilated body laying nude in the water. The mutilation of the body was mostly attributed to sharks.

Skin divers preparing to search for the body of Dorothy Rawlinson

== Investigation ==
By the autumn of 1959, local newspapers demanded for officials to fingerprint everybody to find the killer. During the investigation, Bermudian authorities contacted the Federal Bureau of Investigation (FBI) to try and get them involved, but they denied the request. Instead, two Scotland Yard officials, Richard Lewis, 50, and Frederick Taylor, 43, arrived in Bermuda to investigate the cases. During this time, newspapers began to speculate, but later erroneously state as a fact, that the killer was a U.S. Serviceman.

=== Arrest ===
About a month later the Scotland Yard questioned police about Wendell Willis Lightbourne, a potential suspect they had located. He was 19 years old at time of the killings, was known by acquaintances as "donkey", and had worked odd jobs around Bermuda. He also came from a big family with no father-figure, and had been convicted of robbing a 14-year-old schoolgirl in 1958. Police had been aware of him, as he had been questioned after the attack of Flood in July 1958. He had been questioned because he was seen running from the scene after Flood began screaming, but when confronted by police he stated he had run because he was scared they would think it was him, but said he had nothing to do with it; because Flood had not actually seen her attacker, police did not question him further.

Lightbourne was questioned once again in October, but insisted he was innocent. He did claim however that he was at the beach around the time of the Rawlinson's murder, something that caused police to press him further. After a while, he confessed and was charged with killing Rawlinson. Although nothing conclusive enough linked him to the two other murders, the cases were closed after his arrest, with authorities pinpointing Lightbourne as the killer, and although he never firmly admitted to them, he did state that he had "done things he could not remember".

== Trial ==
Lightbourne went on trial in November. He attempted to sway the jury that the killing of Rawlinson was an accident. The jury found him guilty of murder and he was sentenced to death. However, his sentence was commuted to life imprisonment in January 1960, and he was sent to serve his sentence in the United Kingdom.

== See also ==
- List of serial killers in the United Kingdom
