= John Darlington Brobbey =

Ghanaian politician (born 1939)

Member of Parliament for Kade
- President: John Kufour
- Parliamentary group: National Democratic Congress

Personal details
- Born: 11 July 1939 (age 87)
- Education: Manchester University, Sheffield Polytechnic and Slough College of Higher Education.
- Occupation: Personal Manager

John Darlington Brobbey is a Ghanaian politician and member of the first parliament of the fourth republic of Ghana representing Kade constituency under the membership of the National Democratic Congress (NDC).

== Early life and education ==
Brobbey was born on 11 July 1939. He attended the Manchester University, Sheffield Polytechnic and Slough College of Higher Education, where he obtained his Bachelor of Science, Diploma and Post-Graduate Diploma in Psychology, Education Management and Personal Management respectively. He worked as a Personal Manager before going into parliament.

== Personal life ==
Brobbey is a Christian.

== Politics ==
He began his political career in 1992 when he became the parliamentary candidate for the National Democratic Congress (NDC) to represent his constituency in the Eastern Region of Ghana prior to the commencement of the 1992 Ghanaian parliamentary election.

He was sworn into the First Parliament of the Fourth Republic of Ghana on 7 January 1993 after being pronounced winner at the 1992 Ghanaian election held on 29 December 1992.

After serving his four years tenure in office, Brobbey lost his candidacy to his counterpart in the New Patriotic Party (NPP) Francis Kwame Nyarko. He defeated Mercy Owusu-Nimo of the National Democratic Congress (NDC) who polled 17,187 votes representing 37.90% of the total valid votes cast and Agyebeng Kumah Panin of the People's National Convention (PNC) who polled 421 votes representing 0.90% of the total valid votes cast at the 1996 Ghanaian general elections. Nyarko polled 19,616 votes which was equivalent to 43.30% of the total valid votes cast. He was thereafter elected on 7 January 1997.
