= Philip Attipoe =

Ghanaian sprinter

Personal information
- Nationality: Ghanaian
- Born: 23 February 1962
- Died: 14 April 2024 (aged 62)

Sport
- Sport: Sprinting
- Event: 100 metres

Philip Attipoe (23 February 1962 – 14 April 2024) was a Ghanaian sprinter. He competed in the men's 100 metres at the 1984 Summer Olympics.

Attipoe was one of three Nevada Wolf Pack track and field athletes on the 1984 roster to compete at the 1984 Summer Olympics, including Ghanan teammate James Idun and Domingo Tibaduiza for Colombia.
