= John Mayers =

Barbadian sprinter

Personal information
- Nationality: Barbadian
- Born: 17 September 1956 (age 69)

Sport
- Sport: Sprinting
- Event: 200 metres

John Mayers (born 17 September 1956) is a Barbadian sprinter. He competed in the men's 200 metres at the 1984 Summer Olympics.
