= Kwabena Ohemeng-Tinyase =

Ghanaian politician (born 1952)

Member of the Ghana Parliament for Kade Constituency

Personal details
- Born: 6 April 1952 (age 74) Kade, Eastern Region, Ghana
- Party: New Patriotic Party
- Education: University of Ghana; University of Warwick

Kwabena Ohemeng-Tinyase (born 6 April 1952) is a Ghanaian politician and member of the Seventh Parliament of the Fourth Republic of Ghana representing the Kade Constituency in the Eastern Region on the ticket of the New Patriotic Party.

== Early life and education ==
Ohemeng-Tinyase was born on 6 April 1952 at Kade in the Eastern Region of Ghana. He earned his bachelor of Arts degree in Economics and Political Science from the University of Ghana in 1978. In 2004, he obtained his certificate in Charted Accountancy from the Institute of Chartered Accountants of Ghana, and a master's degree in Business Administration from the University of Warwick.

== Career ==
Before Ohemeng-Tinyase was elected as a member of parliament, he was a chartered Accountant/ country consultant with the World Bank Rural and private sector development project, Freetown, Sierra Leone from 2010 to 2015, consultant with international fund for agricultural development, Freetown, Sierra Leone, from 2015 to 2016.

== Politics ==
Ohemeng-Tinyase is a member of the New Patriotic Party and was the member of parliament for Kade constituency in the Eastern Region of Ghana in the Seventh Parliament of the fourth republic of Ghana.

=== 2016 election ===
Ohemeng-Tinyasa contested the Kade constituency parliamentary seat in the Eastern Region on the ticket of the New Patriotic Party during the 2016 Ghanaian general election and won with 33,442 votes, representing 69.92% of the total votes. He was elected over George Agyemang Duah of the National Democratic Congress, who polled 14,088 votes, which is equivalent to 29.46%, while the parliamentary candidate for the Convention People's Party Frank Eshun had 296 votes, representing 0.62% of the total votes cast.
