= Sterling Hinds =

Canadian sprinter and football player (born 1961)

Personal information
- Born: 31 October 1961 (age 65) Toronto, Ontario, Canada

Sport
- Country: Canada
- Sport: Sprint, football
- Events: 100 m, 4 × 100 m relay
- College team: Washington Huskies
- Team: Toronto Argonauts
Medal record
Men's Athletics
Representing Canada
Olympic Games
Bronze medal – third place	1984 Los Angeles	4 × 100 m relay
Universiade
Silver medal – second place	1983 Edmonton	4 × 100 m relay

Sterling Hinds (born 31 October 1961) is a Canadian retired sprinter and football player. He won the bronze medal in 4 × 100 m relay at the 1984 Olympic Games, and played professional football with the Toronto Argonauts.

Hinds was born in Toronto, Ontario. He played ice hockey as a youth, rising to the level of Junior B. He attended the University of Washington on a football scholarship where he was a tailback for the Washington Huskies, and also competed in track. His most notable achievement with the Huskies was the 1982 Rose Bowl victory over the University of Iowa Hawkeyes.

At the 1984 Summer Olympics in Los Angeles, Hinds won a bronze medal in the 4 × 100 m relay together with teammates Ben Johnson, Tony Sharpe and Desai Williams in a time of 38.70 seconds.

After his track days, Hinds signed with the Toronto Argonauts of the Canadian Football League. He played 8 games in 1984 and 1985, before a knee injury ended his football career. He then got his real estate license and is now a realtor.

Hinds' brothers Doug and Jerry were also members of the Canadian track team, with younger brother Stuart also being a Canadian national finalist.
