= Athletics at the 1976 Arab Games =

Athletics at the 1976 Pan Arab Games

1976 Pan Arab Games

- Syria, Damascus
- October 6–21

== MEN ==
=== 100m ===
MEDAL	ATHLETE	DOB	COUNTRY	MARK	W/I	RECORD	NOTES
	Mohammed Al-Sehli	1955	KSA	10.88		CR	
	Ziad Kat		SYR	10.90			
	Maki Fadl El Moula		SUD	10.95			

=== 200m ===
MEDAL	ATHLETE	DOB	COUNTRY	MARK	W/I	RECORD	NOTES
	Omar Ghizlat	1950	MAR	22.05			
	Maki Fadl El Moula		SUD	22.28			
	A.F. Malki		KSA	22.37			

=== 400m ===
MEDAL	ATHLETE	DOB	COUNTRY	MARK	W/I	RECORD	NOTES
	Hassan El Kashief	1956	SUD	46.95			
	D. Biro		SUD	48.03			
	Hassan Abdulkarim		KSA	48.53		NR	

=== 800m ===
MEDAL	ATHLETE	DOB	COUNTRY	MARK	W/I	RECORD	NOTES
	Omar Khalifa	1956	SUD	1:49.30		CR	
	Mohamed Mahmoud Merghani		SUD	1:52.33			
	Ali Birotok El Turki		SUD	1:52.94			

=== 1500m ===
MEDAL	ATHLETE	DOB	COUNTRY	MARK	W/I	RECORD	NOTES
	Omar Khalifa	1956	SUD	3:47.84		CR	
	A. Abbas		MAR	3:49.96			
	A.H. Chwal		SUD	3:51.94			

=== 5000m ===
MEDAL	ATHLETE	DOB	COUNTRY	MARK	W/I	RECORD	NOTES
	Mohamed Benbaraka	1949	MAR	14:30.02		CR	
	John Narat	1945	SUD	14:45.27			
	Jadour Haddou	1949	MAR	14:51.89			

=== 10,000m ===
MEDAL	ATHLETE	DOB	COUNTRY	MARK	W/I	RECORD	NOTES
	Moussa Medani	1948	SUD	29:25.65		CR	
	Jadour Haddou	1949	MAR	30:32.57			
	Khalifa Oteich		SYR	32:02.02			

=== Marathon ===
MEDAL	ATHLETE	DOB	COUNTRY	MARK	W/I	RECORD	NOTES
	Moussa Medani	1948	SUD	2:28:18			
	Khalifa Oteich		SYR	2:58:31			
	Akil Hamdane	1953	SYR	2:58:52			

=== 3000SC ===
MEDAL	ATHLETE	DOB	COUNTRY	MARK	W/I	RECORD	NOTES
	Mohamed Benbaraka	1949	MAR	9:05.23		CR	
	John Narat	1945	SUD	9:35.33		NR	
	Abdelkarim Jumaa	1954	SYR	9:46.35			

=== 110H ===
MEDAL	ATHLETE	DOB	COUNTRY	MARK	W/I	RECORD	NOTES
	Ahmed Chiboub		MAR	15.10	nwi		
	Abdelmajid Salim		SUD	15.52	nwi		
	Z. Fattal		SYR	16.23	nwi		

=== 400H ===
MEDAL	ATHLETE	DOB	COUNTRY	MARK	W/I	RECORD	NOTES
	Abdelmoula Aziz		MAR	54.94			
	Ahmed Chiboub		MAR	55.52			
	Adnan Metwali		SYR	55.60			

=== HJ ===
MEDAL	ATHLETE	DOB	COUNTRY	MARK	W/I	RECORD	NOTES
	Joseph Ding Rajo		SUD	2.02		CR	
	M Magoun		SUD	1.99			
	Dib Saleh Murhej		SYR	1.93		NR=	

=== PV ===
MEDAL	ATHLETE	DOB	COUNTRY	MARK	W/I	RECORD	NOTES
	Rihan Ali Rihan Obeid	1949	KSA	4.30		CR, NR	
	Assem Maki		SYR	3.85			
	Abdullah Awadh		KSA	3.85			

=== LJ ===
MEDAL	ATHLETE	DOB	COUNTRY	MARK	W/I	RECORD	NOTES
	Ziad Kat		SYR	7.17			
	N. Benian		SYR	6.98			
	H. A. Bigh		KSA	6.91			

=== TJ ===
MEDAL	ATHLETE	DOB	COUNTRY	MARK	W/I	RECORD	NOTES
	Nader Jarrah		SYR	14.90		NR	
	I. Mohammed		MAR	14.78		NR	
	Mohammed Al-Bouhairi		KSA	14.59		NR	

=== SP ===
MEDAL	ATHLETE	DOB	COUNTRY	MARK	W/I	RECORD	NOTES
	Adnan Houri	1955	SYR	15.35		CR	
	Ali Zillak		SYR	14.48			
	Mohamed Fatihi		MAR	14.26			

=== DT ===
MEDAL	ATHLETE	DOB	COUNTRY	MARK	W/I	RECORD	NOTES
	Wadaa Shourbaji	1952	SYR	49.14		CR	
	Adnan Houri	1955	SYR	46.68			
	Abdulmoneim Tijjar		SYR	46.44			

=== HT ===
MEDAL	ATHLETE	DOB	COUNTRY	MARK	W/I	RECORD	NOTES
	Mohammed Ayoubi		SYR	48.20			
	Abdulmoneim Tijjar		SYR	48.16			
	Ali Zillak		SYR	42.06			

=== JT ===
MEDAL	ATHLETE	DOB	COUNTRY	MARK	W/I	RECORD	NOTES
	Abderrahman Houri	1955	SYR	65.02		CR	
	S. Assouad		SUD	63.62			
	Oussama Ghami Schab		SYR	63.26			

=== Decathlon ===
MEDAL	ATHLETE	DOB	COUNTRY	MARK	W/I	RECORD	NOTES
	Fouad Douwayer		SYR	5768	pts		
	Zakariya Younes		SYR	5553	pts		
	N. Benian		SYR	5484	pts		

=== 4x100m ===
MEDAL	ATHLETE	DOB	COUNTRY	MARK	W/I	RECORD	NOTES
	Abdelmajid Salim		SUD	42.15		CR	
	-		SUD	42.15		CR	
	-		SUD	42.15		CR	
	Maki Fadl El Moula		SUD	42.15		CR	
	-		SYR	42.17		NR	
	-		SYR	42.17		NR	
	-		SYR	42.17		NR	
	Ziad Kat		SYR	42.17		NR	
	-		KUW	42.54			
	-		KUW	42.54			
	-		KUW	42.54			
	-		KUW	42.54			

=== 4x400m ===
MEDAL	ATHLETE	DOB	COUNTRY	MARK	W/I	RECORD	NOTES
	-		SUD	3:16.18		CR, NR	
	Hassan El Kashief	1956	SUD	3:16.18		CR, NR	
	D. Biro		SUD	3:16.18		CR, NR	
	Omar Khalifa	1956	SUD	3:16.18		CR, NR	
	-		KSA	3:19.07		NR	
	-		KSA	3:19.07		NR	
	-		KSA	3:19.07		NR	
	Hassan Abdulkarim		KSA	3:19.07		NR	
	-		MAR	3:20.28			
	-		MAR	3:20.28			
	-		MAR	3:20.28			
	-		MAR	3:20.28			
