= Kouadio Otokpa =

Ivorian sprinter

Personal information
- Nationality: Ivorian
- Born: 9 June 1959 (age 67)

Sport
- Country: Ivory Coast
- Sport: Sprinting
- Event: 100 metres
Medal record
Men's athletics
Representing Ivory Coast
African Championships
Gold medal – first place	1982 Cairo	4×100 m
Silver medal – second place	1984 Rabat	4×100 m

Kouadio Otokpa (born 9 June 1959) is an Ivorian former sprinter. He competed in the men's 100 metres at the 1984 Summer Olympics, held in Los Angeles, United States.
