= Peter Van Miltenburg =

Australian sprinter

Peter Van Miltenburg (born 16 August 1957 in Geelong, Victoria) is a former Australian sprinter who specialised in the 200 metres.

In 1981 he represented Australia/Oceania in the IAAF World Cup in Rome in the 200 metres where he finished 9th. He also ran in both relays that finished 8th. He was the Australian 200-metre champion in 1984. He also went to the 1984 Los Angeles Olympics where he competed in the 100/200 metres, but did not progress past the quarterfinals. He came equal 4th in a 100m quarter-final at the 1984 olympics. His personal best for the 200m was 20.69 seconds. His 100 metre best was the 10.47 (wind -2.2 m/s)he ran in Adelaide, 14 March 1984 More recently he has been coaching at Xavier College, Kew, Victoria as the head coach of Athletics and Cross Country. Peter "Van" Van Miltenburg as he is affectionately known by his students, led 'the Xavas' to a 2009 APS Athletics premiership which has since gone down in Xavier history as one of its great sporting achievements.
