= Abdul Jabbar Rahima =

Iraqi hurdler

Personal information
- Nationality: Iraqi
- Born: 1 July 1954 (age 72)

Sport
- Sport: Track and field
- Event: 110 metres hurdles

Abdul Jabbar Rahima (born 1 July 1954) is an Iraqi hurdler. He competed in the men's 110 metres hurdles at the 1980 Summer Olympics.
