= Clayton Kearney =

Australian sprinter and coach

Clayton Kearney (born 11 April 1964) is a former Australian sprinter and professional fitness coach.

== Sprinting career ==
During his career Kearney won the world beach sprint title among other Australian titles. In 1986 he won the 200m National Track Championship and in that same year competed on the Grand Prix International circuit throughout Europe, Great Britain, Canada and the United States, winning most of his races, including five national titles, while racing against the likes of Ben Johnson, Carl Lewis and Linford Christie. After coming back from major injury, Kearney recorded a 100 metre time of 9.9sec hand timed, a 10.16sec electronic (wind assisted) in 1988, and in 1990 set a new professional world record of 11.82sec over 120 metres.

== Coaching career ==
In retirement Kearney was appointed the fitness and speed coach for the Manly Sea Eagles. His role was one of rebuilding, with the main focus being on building strength and speed. The team was generally regarded as being slow but since his involvement there has been a marked improvement in speed to the extent that they were then considered one of the quickest teams in the NRL competition, he has since been appointed to a similar role at the Canterbury-Bankstown Bulldogs and has achieved similar results. Likewise, in 2000 and 2001 Kearney coached fitness and speed at Sydney Olympic Soccer club. In 2000 they outperformed expectations by reaching the semi-finals and in 2001 went on to win the National Soccer League title. These results were largely due to the team's improved fitness and speed, which undoubtedly improved their overall physical and mental skill level. Clayton has also coached track athletics extensively at St Aloysius' College, Sydney since 1999.
