= Fred Martin (sprinter) =

Australian sprinter

Fred Martin (born 4 October 1966) is an Australian former sprinter who competed in the 1984 Summer Olympics.
