= Ofosu Asamoah =

Ghanaian politician

Hon. Ofosu Asamoah

Member of Parliament for Kade Constituency (3rd Parliament)
- In office 7 January 2001 – 6 January 2005
- President: John Agyekum Kufuor
- Preceded by: Francis Kwame Nyarko
- Succeeded by: Ofosu Asamoah

Member of Parliament for Kade Constituency (4th Parliament)
- In office 7 January 2005 – 6 January 2009
- President: John Agyekum Kufuor
- Preceded by: Ofosu Asamoah
- Succeeded by: Ofosu Asamoah

Member of parliament for Kade Constituency (5th Parliament)
- In office 7 January 2009 – 6 January 2013
- President: John Dramani Mahama
- Preceded by: Ofosu Asamoah
- Succeeded by: Ofosu Asamoah

Member of parliament for Kade Constituency (6th Parliament)
- In office 7 January 2013 – 6 January 2017
- Preceded by: Ofosu Asamoah
- Succeeded by: Kwabena Ohemeng Tinyase

Personal details
- Born: 25 November 1969 (age 56)
- Party: New Patriotic Party
- Children: 3
- Education: University of Ghana, Accra
- Profession: Lawyer

Ofosu Asamoah (born 25 November 1969) is a lawyer and was the member of parliament representing Kade constituency in the Eastern region of Ghana.

== Early life and education ==
Ofosu was born on 25 November 1969. He hails from Kade, a town in the Eastern region of Ghana. He obtained his Bachelor of Arts degree in Law and Political Science at the University of Ghana in 1994. He went on to obtain his Bachelor of Law at the Ghana School of Law in 1997.

== Political career ==
Ofosu is a member of New Patriotic Party. He was a committee member for Constitution, Legal and Parliamentary, Subsidiary Legislation. He became a member of the 5th Parliament of the 4th Republic of Ghana representing Kade constituency after he was re-elected into office in the 2008 Ghanaian General Elections. He had a run of 4 terms in office starting in January 2001 and left office in January 2017.

== Elections ==
In the year 2000, Asamoah won the general elections as the member of parliament for the Kade constituency of the Eastern Region of Ghana. He won on the ticket of the New Patriotic Party. His constituency was a part of the 18 parliamentary seats out of 26 seats won by the New Patriotic Party in that election for the Eastern Region.The New Patriotic Party won a majority total of 99 parliamentary seats out of 200 seats. Asamoah was elected with 20,319 votes. This was equivalent to 62.20% of the total valid votes cast. He was elected over Faustina Koranteng Addo of the National Democratic Congress, George Ankomah Yeboah of the Convention People’s PartyAppiah-Twum Barimah of the People's National Convention and Ohene Antwi Tutu of the National Reformed Party. These won 11,369, 588, 238 and 176 votes out of the total valid votes cast respectively. These were equivalent to 34.80%, 1.80%, 0.70% and 0.50% respectively of total valid votes cast.

== Career ==
Ofosu is a lawyer. He was a partner at Kimberly Chambers. He became a member of the parliament of Ghana in January 2001.

== Personal life ==
Ofosu is married with four children. He is a Christian (Presbyterian).
