= Mohamed Purnomo =

Indonesian sprinter (1962–2019)

Personal information
- Full name: Purnomo Muhammad Wijaya Yudhi
- Nationality: Indonesian
- Born: 12 July 1962 Purwokerto, Central Java, Indonesia
- Died: 15 February 2019 (aged 56) Jakarta, Indonesia

Sport
- Country: Indonesia
- Sport: Men's athletics
- Event: 100 metres
Medal record
Men's athletics
Representing Indonesia
Asian Championships
Silver medal – second place	1983 Kuwait City	200 m
Silver medal – second place	1985 Jakarta	100 m
Silver medal – second place	1985 Jakarta	200 m
Bronze medal – third place	1983 Kuwait City	100 m
Southeast Asian Games
Gold medal – first place	1985 Bangkok	200 m
Silver medal – second place	1983 Singapore	100 m
Bronze medal – third place	1983 Singapore	200 m
Bronze medal – third place	1985 Bangkok	100 m

Mohamed Yudhi Purnomo (12 July 1962 – 15 February 2019) was an Indonesian sprinter. He competed in the men's 100 metres, 200 metres, and the 4 × 100 metres relay at the 1984 Summer Olympics.

== International competitions ==
Representing Indonesia
Year	Competition	Venue	Position	Event	Result	Wind (m/s)	Notes
1983	World Championships	Helsinki, Finland	4th (q)	100 m	10.76	-1.0	Heat 1
