= Athletics at the 1982 Commonwealth Games – Men's 200 metres =

Men's 200 metres at the Commonwealth Games

The men's 200 metres event at the 1982 Commonwealth Games was held on 5 and 7 October at the QE II Stadium in Brisbane, Australia.

The final resulted in a photo-finish between Allan Wells and Mike McFarlane. Since they could not be separated, they were both awarded the gold medal.

== Medalists ==
Gold	Silver	Bronze
Mike McFarlane; England; Allan Wells; Scotland		Cameron Sharp; Scotland

== Results ==
=== Heats ===
Qualification: First 6 in each heat (Q) qualify for the quarterfinals.

Wind:
Heat 1: ? m/s, Heat 2: -1.1 m/s, Heat 3: ? m/s, Heat 4: +0.8 m/s, Heat 5: -0.7 m/s, Heat 6: ? m/s

Rank	Heat	Name	Nationality	Time	Notes
1	3	Samson Oyeledun	Nigeria	21.11	Q
2	5	Donovan Reid	England	21.25	Q
3	3	John Anzrah	Kenya	21.38	Q
4	5	Bruce Frayne	Australia	21.43	Q
5	5	Alfred Nyambani	Kenya	21.50	Q
6	5	Allan Wells	Scotland	21.55	Q
7	3	Desai Williams	Canada	21.59	Q
8	6	Cameron Sharp	Scotland	21.60	Q
9	3	Richard Louis	Barbados	21.67	Q
10	6	Ikpoto Eseme	Nigeria	21.73	Q
11	4	Don Quarrie	Jamaica	21.76	Q
11	4	Christopher Madzokere	Zimbabwe	21.76	Q
11	6	Graeme Watson	England	21.76	Q
14	6	David Lukuba	Tanzania	21.78	Q
15	3	Ernest Obeng	Ghana	21.80	Q
16	4	Awudu Nuhu	Ghana	21.82	Q
16	6	Michael Okot	Uganda	21.82	Q
18	3	John Banda	Zambia	21.85	Q
19	2	Lawrence Adegbehingbe	Nigeria	21.86	Q
20	5	Samuel Aidoo	Ghana	21.89	Q
21	3	Joseph Leota	Western Samoa	21.90	
22	2	Christopher Brathwaite	Trinidad and Tobago	21.95	Q
23	2	Paul Narracott	Australia	21.98	Q
24	2	Omar Fye	Gambia	22.01	Q
25	1	Mike McFarlane	England	22.02	Q
26	4	Shepherd Mogapi	Botswana	22.08	Q
27	2	Tony Sharpe	Canada	22.09	Q
28	4	Henry Ngolwe	Zambia	22.12	Q
29	1	Gus McCuaig	Scotland	22.13	Q
30	4	Peter Donavon	Australia	22.18	Q
31	5	Odiya Silweya	Malawi	22.20	Q
32	2	Lapule Tamean	Papua New Guinea	22.23	Q
33	1	Peni Bati	Fiji	22.33	Q
34	2	Inoke Bainimoli	Fiji	22.36	
35	3	Pius Kgannyeng	Botswana	22.45	
36	1	David Carter	Barbados	22.48	Q
37	6	Mark Fanucci	Zimbabwe	22.68	Q
38	6	Georges Taniel	Vanuatu	22.71	
39	1	Clifford Sibusiso Mamba	Swaziland	22.83	Q
40	6	Jim Marau	Solomon Islands	22.85	
41	2	Gian Poggioli	Zimbabwe	22.87	
42	2	Lee Tze Fai	Hong Kong	22.87	
43	5	Rolagi Faa Mausili	Western Samoa	22.90	
44	1	Sioeli Saufoi	Western Samoa	22.94	Q
45	4	Leslie Lazarus	Solomon Islands	23.03	
46	1	Joseph Njewa	Malawi	23.05	
47	5	Gilles Brelu-Brelu	Mauritius	23.06	
	1	Ben Johnson	Canada	DNF	
	4	James Atuti	Kenya	DNF	
	1	Hasely Crawford	Trinidad and Tobago	DNS	

=== Quarterfinals ===
Qualification: First 4 in each heat (Q) and the next 2 fastest (q) qualify for the semifinals.

Wind:
Heat 1: -1.3 m/s, Heat 2: -1.6 m/s, Heat 3: ? m/s, Heat 4: -2.0 m/s

Rank	Heat	Name	Nationality	Time	Notes
1	2	Tony Sharpe	Canada	21.02	Q
2	2	Paul Narracott	Australia	21.06	Q
3	2	Donovan Reid	England	21.11	Q
4	2	Christopher Brathwaite	Trinidad and Tobago	21.19	Q
5	2	Ernest Obeng	Ghana	21.28	q
6	1	Ikpoto Eseme	Nigeria	21.29	Q
7	3	Luke Watson	England	21.32	Q
7	4	Allan Wells	Scotland	21.32	Q
9	1	Mike McFarlane	England	21.42	Q
10	1	Cameron Sharp	Scotland	21.45	Q
11	3	Samson Oyeledun	Nigeria	21.47	Q
12	1	Bruce Frayne	Australia	21.49	Q
13	3	John Anzrah	Kenya	21.52	Q
13	3	Don Quarrie	Jamaica	21.52	Q
15	4	Desai Williams	Canada	21.56	Q
16	2	Christopher Madzokere	Zimbabwe	21.57	q
17	4	David Lukuba	Tanzania	21.58	Q
18	3	Omar Fye	Gambia	21.59	
19	4	Lawrence Adegbehingbe	Nigeria	21.65	Q
20	3	Gus McCuaig	Scotland	21.69	
21	1	Alfred Nyambani	Kenya	21.72	
22	4	Michael Okot	Uganda	21.80	
23	2	Awudu Nuhu	Ghana	21.81	
24	3	Samuel Aidoo	Ghana	21.87	
25	4	Peter Donavon	Australia	22.01	
26	3	Peni Bati	Fiji	22.08	
27	1	Henry Ngolwe	Zambia	22.15	
27	4	Richard Louis	Barbados	22.15	
29	4	Shepherd Mogapi	Botswana	22.25	
30	4	Clifford Sibusiso Mamba	Swaziland	22.29	
31	3	John Banda	Zambia	22.33	
32	2	Odiya Silweya	Malawi	22.44	
33	1	David Carter	Barbados	22.49	
34	1	Sioeli Saufoi	Western Samoa	22.63	
35	1	Mark Fanucci	Zimbabwe	22.97	
	2	Lapule Tamean	Papua New Guinea	DNS	

=== Semifinals ===
Qualification: First 4 in each semifinal (Q) and the next 1 fastest (q) qualify for the final.

Wind:
Heat 1: +2.1 m/s, Heat 2: +2.1 m/s

Rank	Heat	Name	Nationality	Time	Notes
1	2	Allan Wells	Scotland	20.53	Q
2	2	Mike McFarlane	England	20.60	Q
3	2	Tony Sharpe	Canada	20.75	Q
4	2	Paul Narracott	Australia	20.81	Q
5	1	Cameron Sharp	Scotland	20.84	Q
6	1	Desai Williams	Canada	20.96	Q
7	1	Bruce Frayne	Australia	20.97	Q
8	2	Luke Watson	England	21.02	q
9	1	Donovan Reid	England	21.08	Q
10	2	Christopher Brathwaite	Trinidad and Tobago	21.09	
11	1	Ikpoto Eseme	Nigeria	21.12	
11	2	Samson Oyeledun	Nigeria	21.12	
13	2	John Anzrah	Kenya	21.22	
14	1	Christopher Madzokere	Zimbabwe	21.43	
15	2	David Lukuba	Tanzania	21.46	
16	1	Ernest Obeng	Ghana	21.54	
17	1	Lawrence Adegbehingbe	Nigeria	21.58	
18	1	Don Quarrie	Jamaica	22.04	

=== Final ===
Wind: +0.4 m/s

Rank	Lane	Name	Nationality	Time	Notes
1st place, gold medalist(s)	2	Mike McFarlane	England	20.43	
1st place, gold medalist(s)	5	Allan Wells	Scotland	20.43	
3rd place, bronze medalist(s)	8	Cameron Sharp	Scotland	20.55	
4	9	Paul Narracott	Australia	20.65	
5	3	Bruce Frayne	Australia	20.72	
6	1	Tony Sharpe	Canada	20.77	
7	4	Donovan Reid	England	20.87	
8	7	Luke Watson	England	20.88	
9	6	Desai Williams	Canada	21.04	
