= Athletics at the 1982 Commonwealth Games – Men's 100 metres =

Men's 100 metres at the 1982 Commonwealth Games
- Venue: QE II Stadium
- Dates: 3-4 October
- Competitors: 44 from 22 nations
- Winning time: 10.02

Medalists
gold medal	Allan Wells	Scotland
silver medal	Ben Johnson	Canada
bronze medal	Cameron Sharp	Scotland

The men's 100 metres event at the 1982 Commonwealth Games was held at the QE II Stadium in Brisbane, Australia on 3-4 October 1982.

The winning margin was 0.03 seconds, matching the winning margins from Cardiff in 1958 and Kingston in 1966. As of 2024, these finals are the closest men's 100 metres finals at these games.

== Results ==
=== Heats ===
Qualification: First 6 in each heat (Q) and the next 6 fastest (q) qualify for the quarterfinals.

Wind:

- Heat 1: +1.9 m/s
- Heat 2: -1.3 m/s
- Heat 3: -1.6 m/s
- Heat 4: 0.0 m/s
- Heat 5: 0.0 m/s

Rank	Heat	Name	Nationality	Time	Notes
1	1	Desai Williams	Canada	10.30	Q
2	5	Ernest Obeng	Ghana	10.43	Q
3	5	Ben Johnson	Canada	10.45	Q
4	3	Allan Wells	Scotland	10.49	Q
5	1	Hasely Crawford	Trinidad and Tobago	10.50	Q
6	1	Cameron Sharp	Scotland	10.54	Q
7	1	Iziaq Adeyanju	Nigeria	10.55	Q
8	2	Tony Sharpe	Canada	10.57	Q
8	4	Ikpoto Eseme	Nigeria	10.57	Q
10	3	Paul Narracott	Australia	10.58	Q
11	1	Christopher Madzokere	Zimbabwe	10.59	Q
11	4	Don Quarrie	Jamaica	10.59	Q
13	2	Drew McMaster	Scotland	10.62	Q
13	2	Gerrard Keating	Australia	10.62	Q
13	4	Mike McFarlane	England	10.62	Q
16	3	Samson Oyeledun	Nigeria	10.64	Q
17	1	Omar Fye	Gambia	10.67	Q
18	3	Harry King	England	10.69	Q
18	5	Jim Evans	England	10.69	Q
20	2	Christopher Brathwaite	Trinidad and Tobago	10.71	Q
20	5	Peter Gandy	Australia	10.71	Q
22	1	Peni Bati	Fiji	10.75	Q
23	1	Joseph Leota	Western Samoa	10.85	q
24	4	Banana Jarju	Gambia	10.88	Q
25	2	Peter Wekesa	Kenya	10.89	Q
26	4	David Lukuba	Tanzania	10.92	Q
27	4	Inoke Bainimoli	Fiji	10.98	Q
28	5	Samuel Aidoo	Ghana	11.03	Q
29	4	Clifford Sibusiso Mamba	Swaziland	11.05	q
29	4	Sioeli Saufoi	Western Samoa	11.05	q
31	3	Alfred Nyambani	Kenya	11.07	Q
32	3	Charles Gumbura	Zimbabwe	11.10	Q
33	2	Lee Tze Fai	Hong Kong	11.13	Q
34	5	Odiya Silweya	Malawi	11.14	Q
35	3	Stalin Issah	Ghana	11.17	q
35	5	Charles Kachenjala	Zambia	11.17	q
37	5	Georges Taniel	Vanuatu	11.19	
38	2	Zenas Marambakuyama	Zimbabwe	11.28	
39	2	Leslie Lazarus	Solomon Islands	11.38	
40	3	Jim Marau	Solomon Islands	11.39	
41	3	David McCutcheon	Isle of Man	11.40	
42	4	Joseph Njewa	Malawi	11.42	
43	2	Gilles Brelu-Brelu	Mauritius	11.50	
44	5	Joseph Keil	Western Samoa	11.78	

=== Quarterfinals ===
Qualification: First 4 in each heat (Q) and the next 2 fastest (q) qualify for the semifinals.

Wind:

- Heat 1: +2.6 m/s
- Heat 2: 0.0 m/s
- Heat 3: +3.5 m/s
- Heat 4: +2.6 m/s

Rank	Heat	Name	Nationality	Time	Notes
1	1	Allan Wells	Scotland	10.22	Q
2	3	Desai Williams	Canada	10.25	Q
3	4	Tony Sharpe	Canada	10.26	Q
4	1	Ernest Obeng	Ghana	10.27	Q
5	1	Christopher Brathwaite	Trinidad and Tobago	10.30	Q
6	2	Ben Johnson	Canada	10.31	Q
7	3	Drew McMaster	Scotland	10.32	Q
8	2	Cameron Sharp	Scotland	10.36	Q
8	3	Jim Evans	England	10.36	Q
10	2	Paul Narracott	Australia	10.37	Q
11	1	Gerrard Keating	Australia	10.38	Q
12	4	Hasely Crawford	Trinidad and Tobago	10.41	Q
13	4	Mike McFarlane	England	10.45	Q
14	2	Harry King	England	10.47	Q
15	1	Samson Oyeledun	Nigeria	10.48	q
16	3	Iziaq Adeyanju	Nigeria	10.51	Q
17	3	Don Quarrie	Jamaica	10.51	q
18	4	Peter Gandy	Australia	10.55	Q
19	2	Ikpoto Eseme	Nigeria	10.56	
20	3	David Lukuba	Tanzania	10.67	
21	4	Christopher Madzokere	Zimbabwe	10.69	
22	1	Omar Fye	Gambia	10.70	
23	3	Peter Wekesa	Kenya	10.71	
24	1	Charles Gumbura	Zimbabwe	10.72	
25	4	Peni Bati	Fiji	10.79	
26	3	Samuel Aidoo	Ghana	10.81	
27	4	Alfred Nyambani	Kenya	10.82	
28	1	Clifford Sibusiso Mamba	Swaziland	10.87	
29	3	Odiya Silweya	Malawi	10.96	
30	2	Sioeli Saufoi	Western Samoa	10.97	
31	1	Inoke Bainimoli	Fiji	10.99	
31	2	Banana Jarju	Gambia	10.99	
31	4	Lee Tze Fai	Hong Kong	10.99	
34	4	Joseph Leota	Western Samoa	11.02	
35	2	Charles Kachenjala	Zambia	11.37	
	2	Stalin Issah	Ghana	DNS	

=== Semifinals ===
Qualification: First 4 in each semifinal (Q) and the next 1 fastest (q) qualify for the final.

Wind:
Heat 1: +0.9 m/s, Heat 2: +1.9 m/s

Rank	Heat	Name	Nationality	Time	Notes
1	1	Allan Wells	Scotland	10.20	Q
2	2	Cameron Sharp	Scotland	10.26	Q
3	1	Ben Johnson	Canada	10.30	Q
4	1	Paul Narracott	Australia	10.31	Q
4	2	Desai Williams	Canada	10.31	Q
6	2	Gerrard Keating	Australia	10.33	Q
7	1	Tony Sharpe	Canada	10.37	Q
7	2	Mike McFarlane	England	10.37	Q
7	2	Drew McMaster	Scotland	10.37	q
10	2	Ernest Obeng	Ghana	10.38	
11	2	Hasely Crawford	Trinidad and Tobago	10.40	
12	1	Christopher Brathwaite	Trinidad and Tobago	10.43	
12	2	Don Quarrie	Jamaica	10.43	
14	1	Jim Evans	England	10.47	
15	1	Harry King	England	10.49	
16	1	Samson Oyeledun	Nigeria	10.54	
17	2	Iziaq Adeyanju	Nigeria	10.57	
18	1	Peter Gandy	Australia	10.73	

=== Final ===
Wind: +5.9 m/s

Rank	Lane	Name	Nationality	Time	Notes
1st place, gold medalist(s)	8	Allan Wells	Scotland	10.02	
2nd place, silver medalist(s)	7	Ben Johnson	Canada	10.05	
3rd place, bronze medalist(s)	2	Cameron Sharp	Scotland	10.07	
4	6	Paul Narracott	Australia	10.09	
5	1	Mike McFarlane	England	10.11	
6	4	Tony Sharpe	Canada	10.11	
7	9	Drew McMaster	Scotland	10.16	
8	5	Desai Williams	Canada	10.17	
9	3	Gerrard Keating	Australia	10.18	
