= Athletics at the 1982 Commonwealth Games – Men's 4 × 100 metres relay =

Men's 4 × 100 metres relay at the Commonwealth Games

The men's 4 × 100 metres relay event at the 1982 Commonwealth Games was held on 8 and 9 October at the QE II Stadium in Brisbane, Australia.

== Medalists ==
Gold	Silver	Bronze
Nigeria; Lawrence Adegbehingbe; Iziaq Adeyanju; Samson Oyeledun; Ikpoto Eseme	Canada; Ben Johnson; Tony Sharpe; Desai Williams; Mark McKoy	Scotland; Gus McCuaig; Allan Wells; Cameron Sharp; Drew McMaster

== Results ==
=== Heats ===
Qualification: First 4 teams of each heat (Q) plus the next 1 fastest (q) qualified for the final.

Rank	Heat	Nation	Athletes	Time	Notes
1	2	Canada	Ben Johnson, Tony Sharpe, Desai Williams, Mark McKoy	39.88	Q
2	2	Nigeria	Lawrence Adegbehingbe, Iziaq Adeyanju, Ikpoto Eseme, Samson Oyeledun	39.89	Q
3	2	Australia	Paul Narracott, Gerrard Keating, Bruce Frayne, Peter Gandy	39.92	Q
4	1	Scotland	Gus McCuaig, Allan Wells, Cameron Sharp, Drew McMaster	40.12	Q
5	1	England	Harry King, Donovan Reid, Mike McFarlane, Jim Evans	40.32	Q
6	1	Ghana	Ernest Obeng, William Hammond, Samuel Aidoo, Awudu Nuhu	40.75	Q
7	2	Kenya	Alfred Nyambani, Peter Wekesa, John Anzrah, James Maina Boi	41.04	Q
8	2	Western Samoa	William Fong, Sioeli Saufoi, Rolagi Faa Mausili, Joseph Leota	42.10	q
9	1	Zimbabwe	Charles Gumbura, Gian Poggioli, Zenas Marambakuyama, Christopher Madzokere	42.19	Q
10	1	Gambia	Bamba Njie, Omar Fye, Banana Jarju, Ismaila Othman	43.30	

=== Final ===
Rank	Lane	Nation	Athletes	Time	Notes
1st place, gold medalist(s)	1	Nigeria	Lawrence Adegbehingbe, Iziaq Adeyanju, Samson Oyeledun, Ikpoto Eseme	39.15	
2nd place, silver medalist(s)	8	Canada	Ben Johnson, Tony Sharpe, Desai Williams, Mark McKoy	39.30	
3rd place, bronze medalist(s)	9	Scotland	Gus McCuaig, Allan Wells, Cameron Sharp, Drew McMaster	39.33	
4	3	Australia	Paul Narracott, Gerrard Keating, Bruce Frayne, Peter Gandy	39.39	
5	2	England	Harry King, Donovan Reid, Mike McFarlane, Jim Evans	39.67	
6	4	Ghana	Ernest Obeng, William Hammond, Samuel Aidoo, Awudu Nuhu	40.52	
7	5	Kenya	Alfred Nyambani, Peter Wekesa, John Anzrah, James Maina Boi	40.94	
8	6	Zimbabwe	Charles Gumbura, Gian Poggioli, Zenas Marambakuyama, Christopher Madzokere	41.75	
9	7	Western Samoa	William Fong, Sioeli Saufoi, Rolagi Faa Mausili, Joseph Leota	41.91	NR
