= Drive This! =

Drive This! was a sports radio talk show produced from The Score Television Network studios in Toronto, Canada. It was broadcast weekdays from 4:00 p.m. to 6:00 p.m. ET on Hardcore Sports Radio Sirius channel 98 with various repeat times and simulcast on The Score Television Network except on Tuesdays, beginning January 7, 2008. It ended on April 9, 2009, when host Richard Garner left Hardcore Sports Radio.

== Format ==
The program was hosted by Richard Garner, with co-hosts Cam Stewart and Sarah Meehan. Gabriel Morency also made daily appearances.

The most interesting, bizarre, hilarious, hot button issues from the world of sports were discussed in a completely uncensored, thought provoking and genuinely passionate manner unlike any other sports radio show. On television however, most of the profanity was bleeped. The 2 hour program consisted of 6 segments:

Segment 1: 4:00 p.m. - 4:14 p.m. ET (approx.)

Segment 2: 4:17 p.m. - 4:27 p.m. ET (approx.)

Segment 3: 4:31 p.m. - 4:51 p.m. ET (approx.)

Segment 4: 5:00 p.m. - 5:11 p.m. ET (approx.)

Segment 5: 5:16 p.m. - 5:31 p.m. ET (approx.)

Segment 6: 5:36 p.m. - 5:51 p.m. ET (approx.)

Part of the show consisted of callers, usually whom were regulars, voicing their opinions on the topics being discussed on the show or simply commenting on the show itself. E-mails sent in by listeners were also often read on the program, especially those that tended to criticize the hosts or the program. The first three segments also included a TV-only feature called Txt TV, where people could send in messages via SMS or an online form, and discuss anything sports related, not always pertaining to the current topic, and vote in daily polls.

On Fridays, Sarah Meehan surprised her co-hosts with a special secret guest and interesting story which reminded people why they loved sports so much. The segment was entitled "Storytime with Sarah".

== Hosts ==
- Richard Garner
- Cam Stewart (co-host)
- Sarah Meehan (co-host)
- Gabriel Morency (daily guest)
- Geoff Fienberg (Txt TV moderator)
- Chris Dart (Producer)

Occasional Guest co-hosts:

- Greg Sansone (The Score Television Network)
- Tim Miccalef (The Score Television Network)
- Sid Seixeiro (The Score Television Network)
- Adnan Virk (The Score Television Network)
- Cabral Richards (The Score Television Network)
- Pierre Aubry (Hardcore Sports Radio)
- Eric Cohen (Hardcore Sports Radio)
