= Jamal Anderson =

American football player (born 1972)

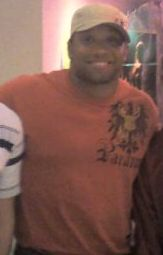
- Anderson in 2007

No. 32
- Position: Running back

Personal information
- Born: September 30, 1972 (age 54); Newark, New Jersey, U.S.
- Listed height: 5 ft 11 in (1.80 m)
- Listed weight: 245 lb (111 kg)

Career information
- High school: El Camino Real (Los Angeles, California)
- College: Moorpark (1990–1991); Utah (1992–1993)
- NFL draft: 1994: 7th round, 201st overall pick

Career history
- Atlanta Falcons (1994–2001)

Awards and highlights
- First-team All-Pro (1998); Pro Bowl (1998); Second-team All-WAC (1993)

Career NFL statistics
- Rushing yards: 5,336
- Rushing average: 4
- Rushing touchdowns: 34
- Receptions: 156
- Receiving yards: 1,645
- Receiving touchdowns: 7
- Stats at Pro Football Reference

Jamal Sharif Anderson (born September 30, 1972) is an American former professional football player who was a running back for the Atlanta Falcons of the National Football League (NFL). He was selected by the Falcons in the seventh round of the 1994 NFL draft. He played high school football at El Camino Real High School, where he was named to the CIF Los Angeles City Section 4-A All-City first-team in 1989. He went on to play college football at Moorpark College for the Moorpark College Raiders before playing for the Utah Utes.

Anderson earned a Pro Bowl selection in 1998, leading the NFC in rushing and helping the Falcons to an appearance in Super Bowl XXXIII. He suffered a career-ending knee injury in 2001 while finishing his eight-year career with 41 touchdowns and nearly 7,000 yards of offense.

== College career ==
Anderson attended Moorpark College in 1990–1991, where he had over 2,800 rushing yards and was named First Team All-Western State Conference in both years. He then attended the University of Utah on a scholarship, where he had 1,275 rushing yards and scored 14 rushing touchdowns in his two years on the team.

== Professional career ==
Pre-draft measurables
Height	Weight	Arm length	Hand span	40-yard dash	10-yard split	20-yard split	Vertical jump	Broad jump	Bench press
5 ft 10 1/2 in (1.79 m)	246 lb (112 kg)	30 5/8 in (0.78 m)	9 in (0.23 m)	4.80 s	1.65 s	2.76 s	30.5 in (0.77 m)	9 ft 1 in (2.77 m)	24 reps

=== Atlanta Falcons ===
Anderson played eight seasons with the Falcons, amassing 5,336 rushing yards, 156 receptions for 1,645 yards, and 41 touchdowns before he suffered what became a career-ending tear of his ACL in 2001. He broke the 1,000-yard barrier in four different seasons between 1996 and 2000. His best season was 1998, when he set an NFL record with 410 carries, and finished with 1,846 rushing yards and 14 rushing touchdowns, both totals second in the league that year behind Terrell Davis.

Anderson was well known for his "Dirty Bird" touchdown celebration, in which he flapped his arms as if they were wings and rhythmically bouncing side to side. The dance has been widely copied; in a press conference Anderson stated, “people break out and do the Dirty Bird in the strangest places.”

=== NFL statistics ===
Rushing Stats

Year	Team	Games	Carries	Yards	Yards per carry	Longest carry	Touchdowns	First downs	Fumbles	Fumbles lost
1994	ATL	3	2	-1	-0.5	0	0	0	0	0
1995	ATL	16	39	161	4.1	13	1	10	0	0
1996	ATL	16	232	1,055	4.5	32	5	46	3	3
1997	ATL	16	290	1,002	3.5	39	7	54	3	1
1998	ATL	16	410	1,846	4.5	48	14	90	5	2
1999	ATL	2	19	59	3.1	20	0	1	0	0
2000	ATL	16	282	1,024	3.6	42	6	53	6	4
2001	ATL	3	55	190	3.5	14	1	8	1	1
Career		88	1,329	5,336	4.0	48	34	262	18	11

Receiving Stats

Year	Team	Games	Receptions	Yards	Yards per Reception	Longest Receptions	Touchdowns	First Downs	Fumbles	Fumbles Lost
1995	ATL	16	4	42	10.5	17	0	2	0	0
1996	ATL	16	49	473	9.7	34	1	19	1	1
1997	ATL	16	29	284	9.8	47	3	15	1	1
1998	ATL	16	27	319	11.8	27	2	13	0	0
1999	ATL	2	2	34	17.0	32	0	1	0	0
2000	ATL	16	42	382	9.1	55	0	14	0	0
2001	ATL	3	3	111	37.0	94	1	1	0	0
Career		88	156	1,645	10.5	94	7	65	2	2

== Sports broadcasting career ==
Anderson appeared as an analyst on ESPN/ABC, often promoting his alma mater the University of Utah, and the Mountain West Conference. He is a big proponent of the BCS non-AQ conference schools gaining more access to the same opportunities as BCS AQ conference schools.

From mid-August to late-October 2009, Anderson appeared as a regular phone-in guest on "Morency" on Hardcore Sports Radio (HSR) to recap/discuss the week that was and the week that was coming up in the NFL with Gabriel Morency and Cam Stewart. After two-week period from late-October to early-November 2009, where HSR dropped Morency (the person and the show) from their programming lineup, Anderson returned as a regular weekly guest again on HSR's replacement show "Red Heat" hosted by Cam Stewart.

In October 2010, Anderson began appearing as an analyst for CNN Newsroom, providing insight on current NFL issues as well as news and highlights from the major sports leagues.

== Personal life ==
Anderson was arrested in February 2009 on suspicion of cocaine possession. Atlanta police said that Anderson and another man were snorting cocaine off the toilet bowl in the restroom of the Peachtree Tavern nightclub.

Anderson was arrested for DUI on June 24, 2012. He was arrested in DeKalb county, just northeast of Atlanta.

Anderson was banned from a QuikTrip store in Suwanee, Georgia on December 14, 2016, after allegedly exposing himself and appearing intoxicated. He was not arrested, but was issued a warning for criminal trespass, effectively a warning that he will be arrested if he returns to that QuikTrip location.

Anderson was arrested on December 23, 2018, after refusing to pay his limo driver $50. He was arrested by Gwinnett County Police where he was released on $213 bail. The limo driver did not press charges. Anderson was intoxicated.

On November 5, 2025 Anderson was arrested on "suspicion of felony domestic violence" at his Los Angeles home in San Fernando Valley. Police said that Anderson was involved in a verbal disagreement that escalated into violence where Anderson allegedly strangled the victim. He was released from custody on a $50,000 bond.

His son, Jamal, is a linebacker for the Clemson Tigers.
