= Gabriel Morency =

Canadian sports broadcaster (born 1970)

- Born: August 10, 1970 (age 56)
- Sports commentary career
- Genre: host

Gabriel Morency (born August 10, 1970) is a Canadian sports broadcaster, who hosted the daily shows Morency and Covers Experts on Hardcore Sports Radio as well as Sports Rage on both Hardcore Sports Radio (HSR) and The Score Television Network. He was also a host on Team 1040 in Vancouver and Team 990 in Montreal. In November 2018 he launched a new show with Corey Parsons and Michelle Serpico, The Morning After on FNTSY Sports Network in New York City. He now hosts several shows for Sportsgrid TV alongside Scott Ferrall, live from the Meadowlands.

== Montreal/Team 990 ==
Morency was born in Montreal, Quebec. Before becoming a broadcaster, Morency played minor hockey before pursuing a career in entertainment, dropping out of school to tour in a rock/metal band named Homicide. He ended up in radio after a Montreal radio talent suggested that he get his own show.

In Montreal, Morency also wrote in the Montreal Mirror, a free press newspaper and was host of The Blue Line, a Montreal Canadiens postgame show, and Sports Line Saturday, as well as a weekly Montreal Expos show. He hosted the show Sports Weekly before joining the Team 990 channel.

Morency placed fourth in the Montreal Readers Poll as the biggest sports personality in the city behind only José Théodore, Saku Koivu and Vladimir Guerrero in 2005. He has placed lower in recent years.

== Hardcore Sports Radio ==
On November 17, 2006, Morency announced that he would be leaving the Team 990. Afterwards it was revealed that he would be joining Hardcore Sports Radio (HSR)

Morency hosted Sports Rage on Hardcore Sports Radio. As well, he made picks on To the Point, a television show on The Score. Morency had several regulars on his show.

Morency was joined by fellow The Score/Hardcore Sports Radio personality Cam Stewart on two shows by the names of Morency and Covers Experts (formerly Game On!) that broadcast on Hardcore Sports Radio Sirius 98. Gabe and Cam were joined by Greg Sansone during Morency, and a different member of the Covers.com website to break down the night in betting during Covers Experts.

Morency also appeared alongside Cam Stewart and Sarah Meehan at the last segment of the show Drive This! on Hardcore Sports Radio hosted by Richard Garner.

== Departure from HSR ==
In late October 2009, Morency was suspended indefinitely for being intoxicated on air. On November 3, 2009, Morency's superiors announced that he was let go by Score Media.

== Morency Sports ==
Following his departure from HSR, Morency announced he was launching MorencySports.com. Sports Rage aired live Monday to Friday from 10 P.M. to 12 A.M. via webcast. Other shows on the site included Gametime Decisions, MMA Meltdown and Avry's Sports Show.

== FNTSY Sports Network ==
Morency is now hosting multiple shows on the network, including Game Time Decisions, which include bets and DraftKings picks, and Morency Unfiltered. In October 2018, he began hosting the morning show Carton and Friends after Craig Carton took a leave of absence from the station. Morency began hosting The Morning After in November 2018.

In August 2017, he began doing late night content on SBRpicks.com a subsidiary of Costa Rican sportsbook news and information company SBRforum.com. He is also featured on Sunday for NFL commentary with Donnie Rightside and Jeff "The Big Man on Campus" Nadu.

As of 2026, Morency is co-hosting a show called Gametime Decisions with Kevin Walsh on the Sportsgrid Network.
