= Hate the Player: The Ben Johnson Story =

Canadian television series

- Screenplay by: Anthony Q. Farrell
- Directed by: R.T. Thorne; Cory Bowles
- Starring: Shamier Anderson; King Bach; Mark McKinney
- Country of origin: Canada
- Original language: English
- No. of series: 1

Production
- Executive producers: Mark Montefiore; Anthony Q. Farrell; R.T. Thorne; Stephan James
- Producer: Lana Maclin
- Production companies: New Metric Media; Bay Mills Studios

Original release
- Network: GameTV; Paramount+
- Release: March 26, 2026

Hate the Player: The Ben Johnson Story is a Canadian comedy television series centred around Canadian sprinter Ben Johnson and his positive drug test at the 1988 Olympic Games. The cast is led by Shamier Anderson as Ben Johnson with King Bach as his American rival Carl Lewis. The series premiered March 26, 2026, on GameTV and Paramount+ in 2026.

== Premise ==
Three days after winning the gold medal in the 100 metres final at the 1988 Olympic Games in Seoul, South Korea, Canadian sprinter Ben Johnson gave a positive drug test for the banned steroid stanozolol and was disqualified. This led to the Dubin Inquiry (1989), which uncovered widespread doping among Canadian athletes.

== Cast ==
- Shamier Anderson as Ben Johnson
- King Bach as Carl Lewis
- Mark McKinney
- Karen Robinson
- Ennis Esmer
- Kristian Bruun
- Malaika Hennie Hamadi
- Ryan Belleville
- Darryl Hinds
- Lisa Horner
- Emma Hunter
- Suresh John
- Jonathan Langdon
- Gita Miller
- Andrew Phung
- Dewshane Williams
- Chelsea Green
- Amber Balcaen

== Production ==
The series was commissioned in June 2025 by Canadian network channel GameTV and streaming channel Paramount+. It is produced by New Metric Media with Bay Mills Studios. New Metric founder Mark Montefiore stated that the project was originally intended to be a drama series but that the "story kept getting more insane and more ridiculous" and Anthony Q. Farrell was brought in as a writer for a comedic slant. The show is produced with participation from Ben Johnson and is inspired by research conducted by author and journalist Mary Ormsby, who wrote the book World’s Fastest Man: The Incredible Life of Ben Johnson (2024). Farrell is showrunner and executive producer, with R.T. Thorne and Cory Bowles as series directors. Montefiore is also an executive producer alongside Thorne and Stephan James for Bay Mills Studio. Lana Maclin is series producer.

The cast is led by Shamier Anderson as Ben Johnson with King Bach as his American rival Carl Lewis, with the cast also including Mark McKinney, Karen Robinson, Ennis Esmer, Kristian Bruun, Malaika Hennie Hamadi, Ryan Belleville, Darryl Hinds, Lisa Horner, Emma Hunter, Suresh John, Jonathan Langdon, Gita Miller, Andrew Phung and Dewshane Williams. The series also features cameo appearances by Chelsea Green and Amber Balcaen.

Filming took place in Toronto in June and July 2025. Filming locations included Dark Slope Studios.

== Broadcast ==
The series premiered on GameTV and Paramount+ in 2026.
