= George Astaphan =

St Kitts and Nevis physician (1946–2006)

- Born: George Mario Astaphan; Saint Kitts
- Died: August 18, 2006 (aged 60); Frigate Bay, Saint Kitts and Nevis
- Other name: Jamie Astaphan
- Education: Sir George Williams University (BSc, 1967); University of Toronto (MD, 1971)
- Occupation: Physician
- Known for: Involvement in the Ben Johnson doping case

George Mario "Jamie" Sahely Chehin Astaphan, M.D., B.Sc. (May 22, 1946 – August 18, 2006) was a Saint Kitts-born physician who became infamous for giving steroids to the sprinter Ben Johnson.

Dr. Astaphan was born on the island of St. Kitts in the West Indies. He attended universities in Canada, where he received a BSc degree from Sir George Williams University (1967) in Montreal, and then graduated from the University of Toronto's Faculty of Medicine in 1971. He practiced medicine in various places in Ontario, Canada: Warkworth, where he had a practice with Dr. Maurio DiPasquale, the doctor who tested for drug use in the WWF and stopped the Ultimate Warrior from wrestling because of performance enhancing drugs Campbellford, Scarborough, North York, and Toronto.

In 1988 he was accused of administering the stanozolol which led Ben Johnson to lose his 100m Gold Medal. These allegations were never proven and Dr. Astaphan denied them for the next 18 years. As a result of the Dubin Inquiry, he was fined by the Ontario College of Physicians and Surgeons in June 1991 and banned from practicing medicine in the province for 18 months.

In 1994, after the plane he was flying on was diverted to New York City, he was charged for conspiracy to distribute steroids, conspiracy to acquire cocaine and conspiracy to distribute cocaine. After nearly two years in a Florida prison without a trial, he was released with "time served" on the steroid charges but the Government had no case on the cocaine charges. After his release in late 1995, Astaphan returned to his native St. Kitts and Nevis where he continued to practice medicine until his death.

Astaphan died at his home in Frigate Bay, Saint Kitts and Nevis, on August 18, 2006, aged 60. Police commissioner Meredith Charles stated that he had suffered a heart attack. He is survived by his three children.
