= Greg Sansone =

Canadian sportscaster

Greg Sansone is a Canadian sports media executive, currently the president of Sportsnet and a member of the leadership team for Rogers Sports & Media.

Prior to this appointment, Greg served as vice president of programming at Sportsnet.

He previously served as vice president of television for The Score and VP of programming and general manager of Sportsnet 360, the Canadian sports channel that replaced The Score, a position he held from the new network's inception.

He became vice president of The Score's programming and production in 2007, a title that would be changed to vice president of television operations.

Notably, he was one of the first sports anchors to ever work for The Score. His debut was in April 1997, the same year The Score, then branded as Headline Sports, made its debut across Canadian airwaves. Prior to joining The Score, he worked as a host at the Fan 590 from 1992 to 1997 and was an editorial assistant for Global Television's SportsLine from 1991 to 1992. He was the host of the popular program The Score Tonight with Martine Gaillard until 2004. Sansone was the co-host of Score on the NFL with Cam Stewart and was also guest host for Morency, a program that was hosted by Gabriel Morency on Hardcore Sports Radio.

His sports media career began as a producer with the Fan 590 while he was still attending university, eventually landing a tryout as an on-air host.
