= Cam Stewart (sportscaster) =

Canadian sports broadcaster

- Born: April 4, 1975 (age 51)
- Other names: Red Heat; The Raging Redhead
- Sports commentary career
- Genre: host

Cam Stewart (a.k.a.: Red Heat, The Raging Red Head) (born April 4, 1975) is a Canadian sports broadcaster.

Stewart grew up in Mississauga, Ontario and played high school football for the Woodlands Rams. In the fall of 1992 he recorded four sacks in a single game against the Lorne Park Spartans.

After graduating from Fanshawe College in 1994, Cam moved to Yellowknife, Northwest Territories in 1995, where he was introduced to the sports media industry.

Stewart hosted the radio program Red Heat on the defunct The Score Satellite Radio and co-hosted Live @theScore and Score on the NFL on The Score Television Network. Other roles on the Score Satellite Radio included co-hosting Drive This!, "Morency" "Covers Experts" and "24in30".

In 2011 Stewart was a judge on Gillette Drafted, a reality show where ten finalists competed to be a sportscaster on the Score television network. The show famously launched the career of Jackie Redmond.

He was a contributor to the FNTSY Sports Network appearing alongside Gabriel Morency and could also be heard on John Oakley's radio program on AM 640 in Toronto.

He is currently an on air host for SportsGrid. He can be heard on Game Time Decisions and In-Game Live.

In November 2024, he stirred controversy during a broadcast of the Drew & Stew Podcast when he railed against the Kansas City Chiefs and stated that Taylor Swift should be thrown in Niagara Falls. In response, he tweeted: "Didn't mean it bad joke".
