= Richard Garner =

Richard Garner (born April 20, 1969) is a Canadian sports broadcaster, producer and the former vice-president of programming at The Score Television Network.

Born in Ottawa, Ontario, Garner grew up in Aylmer, Quebec, where he learned to speak French. He went on to produce television content for prominent Canadian television networks.

He became the executive producer for Hardcore Sports Radio in 2006. Prior to joining Hardcore Sports Radio, he worked as a producer for Rogers Sportsnet.

Garner later became Vice President of Programming for The Score Television Network. While in that position, he hosted and produced Drive This!, an unfiltered sports radio talk show which was simulcast Hardcore Sports Radio and The Score television network.

On March 26, 2009, he announced he was leaving The Score. Following his departure, he devoted his time to an organization called "The One Network".
