= Mary Ormsby (disambiguation) =

Mary Ormsby (born 1960) is a Canadian journalist and sports editor.

Mary Ormsby may also refer to:

- Mary Ormsby (bowls) (1927–2019), Australian international lawn bowls competitor
- Mary L. F. Ormsby (1845–1931), American writer, editor, and educator
