= GameTV =

Canadian specialty TV channel

- Country: Canada
- Broadcast area: National

Programming
- Picture format: 1080i HDTV (downscaled to letterboxed 480i for the SDTV feed)

Ownership
- Owner: Anthem Sports & Entertainment
- Sister channels: Fight Network; Game+ AXS TV

History
- Launched: November 2005, 20 years ago
- Former names: Casino & Gaming Television (2005-2007)

Links
- Website: gametvnetwork.com

GameTV is a Canadian English language discretionary specialty channel. Owned by Anthem Sports & Entertainment, it primarily broadcasts contemporary and classic game shows and reality competition series, as well as feature films.

The channel was first launched in 2005 under the ownership of Stuart Media Group as Casino and Gaming Television (CGTV), which primarily focused on sports betting and televised poker. Larry Tanenbaum's Insight Sports served as the channel's operating partner.

In 2007, the channel was re-launched under its current name, phasing out its casino-based programming in favour of a focus on classic game shows, reality series, and nightly movies. After GameTV was acquired by Anthem in 2016, the channel briefly added sports and sports entertainment-based programming.

== History ==
Official logo as CGTV (2005–2007)

=== As CGTV ===
In September 2001, Stuart Media Group was granted approval by the Canadian Radio-television and Telecommunications Commission (CRTC) to launch The Gaming Channel, described as "a national, English-language Category 2 specialty television service, providing live-event interactive programming about gaming or involving gaming. The service will offer programming including shorts and Canadian original programs about gaming that will be knowledge-based and entertaining, with a focus on providing unique insights into daily events of the gaming world and its participants. The service will also allow viewers to play along with Bingo Games, and will provide experimental, interactive and informational programming on gaming odds, lotteries, and the gaming experience in general."

In December 2004, Stuart Media Group announced that it had reached an agreement with Casino and Gaming Television, Inc., owners of the Casino and Gaming Television (CGTV) brand, which would see Stuart Media Group launch The Gaming Channel as a Canadian version of the yet-to-be-launched American television channel of the same name. The agreement would see the Canadian channel launch in May 2005 on Bell ExpressVu and act as, what the companies called, a "test bed" for the American channel which would also launch later in 2005.

The channel would later launch in November 2005 as Casino and Gaming Television (CGTV) Canada on Rogers Cable instead of initially on Bell ExpressVu. Programming on the channel primarily focused on poker, including live and pre-taped tournaments; however, programming on other casino games and casino-related programming did occur.

Upon the launch of the channel in 2005, CGTV Canada was owned by Stuart Media Group, who in turn was owned by a variety of investors, although was ultimately majority owned by what is now called Kilmer Group. The channel was however operated by Insight Sports, of which Kilmer Group was an investor in as well. The channel would go through several corporate reorganizations throughout its history but Kilmer Group would remain majority owner until it sold its interest in the channel in 2016.

=== As GameTV ===
GameTV logo (2007–2012)

On October 26, 2007, at 6:00 p.m. EST, CGTV was rebranded as GameTV. With the relaunch, the channel would try to broaden its appeal to a larger audience by focusing on game-related programming including game shows (featuring classic Canadian game shows such as The Mad Dash and Test Pattern among others), reality series, and films, as well as "Watch & Win" contest promotions during prime time with weekly prizes.

In October 2012, GameTV debuted a new logo and branding, and dropped its casino programming.

On August 2, 2016, Anthem Sports & Entertainment announced that it would acquire GameTV pending CRTC approval. The CRTC approved the purchase in November 2016.

With the acquisition of GameTV by Anthem Sports & Entertainment, the channel began airing sports and sports entertainment programming, including live/tape-delayed matches and compilations, professional wrestling from the Anthem-owned Impact Wrestling, mixed martial arts programming from the UFC, and all 2017 season matches from the Toronto Wolfpack rugby league team. A high definition feed launched in March 2017.

On March 9, 2018, the CRTC approved of a previously unannounced sale of the channel from Anthem to Remuda Media, a newly established broadcasting company. Shareholders in Remuda Media previously was granted approval from the CRTC to launch The Country Channel, noted at the time as a "service that would offer programming aligned to the interests and needs of rural Canadians." In its application, it was noted that Remuda Media was unsuccessful at launching The Country Channel, and turned its eye to acquiring an existing channel, of which GameTV would be used to launch the service, or one similar. However, in July 2018, Anthem Media sent a letter to the CRTC stating that the proposed transfer in ownership from Anthem to Remuda was terminated, and Anthem would retain ownership of GameTV.

On April 1, 2019, FNTSY Sports Network was quietly replaced in Canada by a newly launched sister channel, Game+.

In August 2020, the channel introduced a new weekend block featuring music programming from new U.S-based sister network AXS TV. The block was discontinued in September 2022. In 2020, it premiered an original documentary series, The Search for Canada's Game Shows, which chronicles the history of Canadian game shows.

In 2025, GameTV and Paramount+ co-commissioned Hate The Player: The Ben Johnson Story, an Anthony Q. Farrell-panned satirical docudrama on Canadian sprinter Ben Johnson.

== See also ==
- Game Show Network, a U.S. equivalent carried by most Canadian television providers.
