= Athletics at the 1978 Commonwealth Games – Men's decathlon =

Men's decathlon at the Commonwealth Games

The men's decathlon event at the 1978 Commonwealth Games was held on 7 and 8 August at the Commonwealth Stadium in Edmonton, Alberta, Canada.

Daley Thompson won the gold medal by a whopping 844 points. This included winning six events including all five events on day one of the competition. His lowest placing for any event in this decathlon was fifth in the javelin throw. Thompson's 8.11m long jump would have been good enough to win the individual event at these Games.

== Results ==
Wind for 100m: Heat 1: +1.6 m/s, Heat 2: +2.3 m/s

Rank	Athlete	Nationality	100m	LJ	SP	HJ	400m	110m H	DT	PV	JT	1500m	Points	Notes
1st place, gold medalist(s)	Daley Thompson	England	10.50w	8.11w	14.43	2.07	47.85	14.92	41.68	4.80	56.60	4:25.78	8467	
2nd place, silver medalist(s)	Peter Hadfield	Australia	10.98w	7.28	13.48	1.92	49.24	15.59	46.52	4.00	60.80	4:54.54	7623	
3rd place, bronze medalist(s)	Alan Drayton	England	11.03w	7.15	11.85	1.95	50.17	14.86	40.60	4.40	57.22	4:54.11	7484	
4	Graeme Watson	England	10.77w	7.31w	13.29	1.89	49.73	16.97	38.04	3.80	54.90	4:44.73	7261	
5	Panayiotis Zeniou	Cyprus	11.38	6.93	13.31	1.75	50.80	16.26	37.38	4.20	56.54	4:20.48	7201	
6	Rob Town	Canada	11.59	6.47	13.33	1.92	52.40	16.40	46.62	3.60	62.20	4:32.30	7138	
7	Robert Sadler	New Zealand	11.42	6.87	12.28	1.95	51.87	15.93	36.66	4.40	42.10	4:20.10	7117	
8	Charles Kokoyo	Kenya	11.32	7.27	9.58	1.89	50.32	16.40	33.90	3.00	65.00	4:32.80	6775	
9	Mike Bull	Northern Ireland	11.60										6610	
10	Tony Verhoeven	Canada	11.64										6453	
11	Dunstan Campbell	Grenada											5515	
	Zenon Smiechowski	Canada	11.64w										DNF	
	Craig Considine	Australia	11.68w	6.75	13.31	DNS	–	–	–	–	–	–	DNF	
