= Martine Gaillard =

Canadian sports television personality

- Born: May 21, 1971 (age 54); Melfort, Saskatchewan, Canada
- Employer: Sportsnet
- Known for: Host of the Sportsnet Central program.

Martine Gaillard (/ˈɡaɪ.ər/; born May 21, 1971) is a Canadian sports television personality currently working for Sportsnet as the weekend late night/morning host of Sportsnet Central.

After graduating from Evan Hardy Collegiate in Saskatoon, Saskatchewan, Gaillard attended Ryerson University, from which she graduated with a degree in Radio and Television Arts. Gaillard began her career working for CFQC radio in Saskatoon in 1990. She then worked for a time at The Weather Network, hosting the "Good Morning Toronto" program. She then worked as the game host for Toronto Maple Leafs broadcasts for two years. In July 1999, Gaillard joined The Score as their first-ever female anchor.

During her time at The Score, Gaillard co-hosted The Score Tonight alongside Greg Sansone for six years and covered events such as the 2000 World Series (a.k.a. the "Subway Series"), MLB and NHL all-star games. She was also hired as part of CBC's Hockey Night in Canada team, and got to work rinkside at hockey games with her idol, CBC hockey anchor Ron MacLean.

In August 2005, it was announced that Gaillard had taken a job at Rogers Sportsnet. She made her debut on the network on October 4, 2005, as co-anchor of Sportsnetnews alongside Mike Toth.
