= Anthem Sports & Entertainment =

Broadcasting and production company based in Toronto, Ontario

Anthem Sports & Entertainment Inc.
- Type: Private
- Industry: Mass media
- Founded: December 2010; 15 years ago
- Founder: Leonard Asper
- Headquarters: Toronto, Ontario, Canada
- Area served: Canada, United Kingdom, United States
- Key people: Leonard Asper (President & CEO); Ed Nordholm (Chief Corporate Officer)
- Products: Broadcasting; Television Production; Digital media Live event promotion
- Production output: Sports; Entertainment
- Owners: Sygnus Corp. (72.95%); Fight Holdings Inc. (25.62%)
- Subsidiaries: AXS TV (Majority owner); EdgeSports; Fight Network; GameTV; Invicta Fighting Championships; Total Nonstop Action Wrestling
- Website: anthemse.com

Anthem Sports & Entertainment Inc. (formerly Anthem Media Group) is a Canadian multinational media and sports entertainment company based in Toronto, Ontario.

Founded by former Canwest president Leonard Asper, the company was initially involved in Canadian specialty television as a stakeholder in Fight Network, as well as fantasy sports-related ventures. In 2016, the company acquired GameTV, and made an investment in the professional wrestling promotion TNA—which would expand to a majority stake in 2017. It would later acquire a stake in U.S. cable network AXS TV in 2019, women's mixed martial arts promotion Invicta Fighting Championships in 2021, and Canadian premium network group Hollywood Suite in 2024.

Anthem is majority-controlled by Asper via his Sygnus Corporation. Fight Holdings, Inc. holds the remaining ownership stake, via the investors Mayhem Capital (59.01%), North American Bond Company (7.19%), Goldfarb Management Services (7.19%), and Slaight Communications (7.19%).

== History ==
=== Founding ===
Anthem Media Group was founded in December 2010 by former Canwest president Leonard Asper, through his acquisition of a majority stake in Fight Network.

On January 10, 2013, Anthem purchased an equity stake in the U.S-based Pursuit Channel. In August 2013, the company would acquire My Combat Channel.

In August 2013, Anthem acquired the fantasy sports websites RotoExperts and SportsGrid, as part of efforts to launch a dedicated fantasy sports-oriented channel. The following year, FNTSY Sports Network launched in March 2014. In January 2015, Anthem acquired the daily fantasy sports website LuDawgs.com, and relaunched the site as DailyRoto.

Anthem Media Group was renamed to Anthem Sports & Entertainment in May 2015. In August 2016, Anthem announced its intent to acquire the Canadian specialty channel GameTV, pending CRTC approval.

=== TNA investment and acquisition ===
In October 2016, Anthem invested in the professional wrestling promotion Total Nonstop Action Wrestling (TNA). Fight Network was its Canadian broadcast partner, and Anthem would loan the company money throughout 2016.

On January 4, 2017, Anthem acquired a majority stake in TNA, forming the subsidiary Anthem Wrestling Exhibitions; the promotion would then rebrand as Impact Wrestling, after its flagship weekly program Impact!. Impact founder Jeff Jarrett rejoined the promotion as chief creative director and, during tapings for the April 20, 2017 episode of Impact, it was announced that Impact Wrestling would merge with Jarrett's own Global Force Wrestling (GFW) promotion under the "GFW" name. Anthem later announced its intent to formally acquire GFW's assets, but by October 23, 2017, Anthem had cut its ties with Jarrett and Global Force.

In October 2017, Anthem launched the Global Wrestling Network, a streaming service featuring archive content from Impact as well as other independent promotions.

On June 26, 2018, it was announced that Peter Einstein would become the new chief operating officer of Anthem.

On August 14, 2018, Jeff Jarrett and Global Force Entertainment filed a lawsuit against Anthem in the United States District Court for the Middle District of Tennessee for copyright infringement over the rights to GFW content, as Jarrett owned all Global Force Wrestling properties since its creation in 2014. A mistrial was declared after a 2020 trial but Jarrett and Anthem settled the case in January 2021.

=== International expansion ===
On September 9, 2019, Anthem announced that it had acquired a majority stake in the U.S. cable networks AXS TV and HDNet Movies, with existing stakeholders Mark Cuban and Anschutz Entertainment Group maintaining equity stakes.

On April 13, 2021, Anthem acquired the women's mixed martial arts promotion Invicta Fighting Championships.

On November 16, 2021, Anthem acquired Cleveland-based film distributor Gravitas Ventures from Red Arrow Studios, the content production and distribution arm of German broadcaster ProSiebenSat.1 Media, for US$73 million in a cash-and-stock deal. The company stated that it planned to use its library across its linear television properties, as well as future free ad-supported streaming television (FAST) businesses. In April 2025, Anthem sold Gravitas Ventures to Shout! Studios, with Gravitas and Shout! continuing to operate as separate brands.

In June 2022, Anthem announced that it would launch AXS TV Now and Fight Network channels on Xumo.

On September 25, 2024, Anthem announced its intent to acquire the Canadian movie channels Hollywood Suite pending CRTC approval. The deal was approved by the CRTC in September 2025.

== Assets ==
=== Current ===
==== TV ====
===== Canada =====
- Fight Network
- GameTV
- Game+
- Hollywood Suite

===== United States =====
- AXS TV, LLC (majority ownership stake; with 2929 Entertainment and AEG)
  - AXS TV
  - HDNet Movies

==== Combat sports ====
- Invicta Fighting Championships
- Total Nonstop Action Wrestling (TNA)
  - TNA+

=== Former ===
- Edge Sport HD (with Trans World International, 80.5%)
- Fight Network (UK)
- Pursuit Channel (minority ownership stake)
- SportsGrid (joint venture with Nexstar Media Group)
- Gravitas Ventures
