= Cabbie Richards =

Canadian sports television personality

- Born: Cabral Richards
- Occupation: Television personality
- Years active: 2001–present

Cabral Richards, better known as Cabbie Richards, is a Canadian sports television personality who is best known for his time on SportsCentre on TSN, a Canadian sports cable television network.

== Broadcasting career ==
Originally an intern at The Score, Richards hosted five-minute segments called Cabbie on the Street from 2001 to 2002. After leaving The Score, he joined Sportsnet to produce and host the programs NBAXL and J-Zone, before moving back to The Score in 2005, where he again hosted Cabbie on the Street segments, along with Cabbie Unlimited and Cabbie All Stars. Richards also hosted NBA Court Surfing, before leaving the network again on November 30, 2010. Since 2011, Richards began hosting a weekly segment on TSN's SportsCentre entitled "Cabbie Presents".

Richards was a special correspondent on The Marilyn Denis Show on CTV from 2011 to 2012, where he brought a male perspective to conversations about relationships, while also filing reports with Hollywood actors, musicians and everyday Canadians on the street.

According to Richards, his particular style of journalism – entertain first, inform second – has allowed him to carve out a unique identity. He often initiates physical contact with the people he interviews, a technique that has gotten mixed reactions from interviewees.

A-List athletes he has interviewed include Michael Jordan, Kobe Bryant, Stephen Curry, Aaron Rodgers, Alexander Ovechkin, Derek Jeter and Alex Rodriguez. Richards' atypical interviews with Kobe Bryant garnered particular attention and their frequent collaborations resulted in a friendly relationship. Richards has also interviewed celebrities Will Smith, Hugh Jackman, Will Ferrell, Kevin Hart, Drake, Wiz Khalifa, A$AP Rocky, and Kendrick Lamar.

=== Cabbie Presents ===
Richards hosted and produced Cabbie Presents, a weekly segment which aired Fridays on "Sportscentre" on TSN, offering a light-hearted look at professional athletes in a sketch-based format.

From 2012 to 2019, Richards also hosted Cabbie Presents: The Podcast where he interviewed a variety of sports and entertainment stars.

=== Departure from TSN ===
Cabbie left TSN on September 6, 2019 to pursue other career aspirations. Thereafter, he began co-hosting Bleacher Report's B/R Betting Show alongside expert Kelly Stewart.

=== Sportsnet ===
Richards rejoined Sportsnet, which acquired The Score Television Network back in 2012, as its executive producer of sports betting content in 2021.

== Voice acting ==
Richards voiced Zeus and Talbot in the video game, Heavy Metal: Geomatrix.

== Personal life ==
Richards grew up in Toronto, Ontario and attended Galt Collegiate Institute in Cambridge, Ontario. He attended Ryerson University's Radio and Television Art's (RTA) program for three years, leaving before completing his degree.
