= Luke Watson (sprinter) =

British sprinter (born 1957)

Buster Watson
Personal information
- Nationality: British (English)
- Born: 19 November 1957 (age 67) Bournemouth, England
- Height: 191 cm (6 ft 3 in)
- Weight: 84 kg (185 lb)

Sport
- Sport: Athletics
- Event: Sprinting / decathlon
- Club: Blackheath Harriers

Luke Graeme Lynton George Watson (born 19 November 1957) is a male retired British sprinter and decathlete who competed at the 1984 Summer Olympics.

== Biography ==
At the 1984 Olympic Games in Los Angeles, he represented Great Britain in the men's 200 metres.

He represented England at the 1978 Commonwealth Games in the Men's decathlon, and also competed for England in the Men's 200 metres at the 1982 Commonwealth Games in Brisbane, Australia. Watson also represented Great Britain at the 1983 World Championships in Athletics.

At national level, he was also double sprint champion at the 1983 UK Athletics Championships, 100 metres runner-up in 1982, and 200 metres runner-up in 1984. At the AAA Championships he was 200 m in 1982, 1984 and 1985, as well as 100 m runner-up in 1978. He placed second in the 60 metres behind Ghana's Ernest Obeng at the AAA Indoor Championships in 1984.

== International competitions ==
Representing Great Britain & England
Year	Competition	Venue	Position	Event	Result	Notes
1978	Commonwealth Games	Edmonton, Canada	4th	Decathlon	7261 pts	
1982	Commonwealth Games	Brisbane, Australia	8th	200 m	20.88	
1983	World Championships	Helsinki, Finland	7th (qf)	100 m	10.57	wind +1.1
1983	World Championships	Helsinki, Finland	5th (qf)	200 m	20.99	wind +1.6
1984	Olympic Games	Los Angeles, United States	6th (qf)	200 m	21.14	

== National titles ==
- UK Athletics Championships
  - 100 m: 1983
  - 200 m: 1983

== See also ==
- Athletics at the 1978 Commonwealth Games – Men's decathlon
- Athletics at the 1982 Commonwealth Games – Men's 200 metres
- List of 200 metres national champions (men)
