= Fight Network (UK) =

- Country: United Kingdom, Ireland
- Broadcast area: United Kingdom; Ireland

Programming
- Language: English
- Picture format: 480i (SDTV); 1080i (HDTV)

Ownership
- Owner: Anthem Sports & Entertainment (Fight Media, Inc.)

History
- Launched: 17 July 2018
- Closed: 1 September 2020

Links
- Website: Fight Network

Availability

Streaming media
- TVPlayer (UK and Ireland): Watch live

Fight Network was a British programming block that broadcast nightly over the channel space of Showcase by Information TV. The channel was owned by Anthem Sports & Entertainment and available through Showcase by Information TV at 9:00 PM every night. Programming featured combat sports from around the world. The channel launched on 17 July 2018 and was based on the Canadian channel of the same name. The channel itself was a revival of the previous version of The Fight Network, which formally broadcast under the name of TWC Fight! and The Wrestling Channel before ceasing transmissions in 2008. However, the channel ceased operations on Showcase in September 2020.

== History ==
=== Relaunch ===
On 13 July 2018, it was announced that Anthem Sports & Entertainment Corp. would relaunch Fight Network as a programming block on Showcase by Information TV. The block would feature various sports, including live Impact Wrestling, Ultimate Challenge MMA, Abu Dhabi Grand Slam, WGP Kickboxing, Wrestling at the Chase and other programmes. Due to the way it was placed and the obscurity of the original version, Anthem were treating it as a new channel launch.

Later in 2019 the channel would add other wrestling promotions like Ring Of Honor, Smash Wrestling, Championship Wrestling from Hollywood and British promotion Preston City Wrestling with them airing on different days than Impact!.

=== Closure ===
On 26 August 2020, Anthem announced that the programming block would no longer be available on Showcase from September 2020, effectively ceasing its operations.

== Programming ==
The most notable content to air on Fight Network is a simulcast of Impact Wrestling, which aired in the United Kingdom on Wednesdays at 9.00pm .

=== International ===
- Abu Dhabi Grand Slam
- Boxing World Weekly
- Championship Wrestling from Hollywood
- Impact Wrestling
- Impact! Xplosion
- International Wrestling Syndicate
- Ohio Valley Wrestling
- Retrospective
- Ring Of Honor
- Smash Wrestling
- Ultimate Challenge MMA
- WGP Kickboxing
- Wrestling at the Chase
- World Arm Wrestling League

=== British ===
- British Boot Camp
- Preston City Wrestling
- Wrestle Talk TV
