= Christopher Madzokere =

Zimbabwean sprinter

Personal information
- Nationality: Zimbabwean
- Born: 13 July 1954 (age 72)
- Height: 1.77 m (5 ft 10 in)

Sport
- Sport: Sprinting
- Event: 100, 200, 400 metres
- Club: Ziscosteel

Christopher Madzokere (born 13 July 1954) is a Zimbabwean sprinter.

He reached the national elite in athletics, training at the Ziscosteel Athletics Club in Redcliff.

The domestic level in Zimbabwean sprint at the time meant that a men's team, with Madzokere as a member, finished 8th in the 4 × 100 metres relay at the 1982 Commonwealth Games. Madzokere also competed in the 100 and 200 metres individually, reaching the 200 semi-final. His personal best was set back in 1980, clocking in 21.13 seconds.

At the inaugural 1983 World Championships, Madzokere competed in both the 100, 200 and 400 metres. In the 200 and 400 metres he progressed from the heats to reach the quarter-final, setting his lifetime best of 46.74 seconds in the one-lap sprint.

At the 1984 Summer Olympics he entered the 200 and 400 metres, but failed to advance past the heat in either event.

Ahead of the Olympics, Madzokere had a training camp at Emory University sponsored by the mayor of Atlanta and the United States Information Agency. The endowed athletes came from socialist countries such as Zimbabwe, Mozambique, Somalia, Tanzania and Panama. Stated Madzokere, "the facilities here, they are the best any African athlete ever dreamed of. We never thought we'd be able to have a chance to use (these facilities) in preparation for the Olympic Games".
