= Henry Ngolwe =

Zambian sprinter

Personal information
- Nationality: Zambian
- Born: 21 November 1961 (age 64)

Sport
- Sport: Sprinting
- Event: 100 metres
Medal record
Men's athletics
Representing Zambia
African Zone VI Championships
Silver medal – second place	1987 Harare	4 × 100 m relay
Bronze medal – third place	1987 Harare	100 m
Gold medal – first place	1988 Gaborone	200 m
Gold medal – first place	1988 Gaborone	4 × 100 m relay
Silver medal – second place	1988 Gaborone	200 m
East and Central African Championships
Bronze medal – third place	1988 Nairobi	100 m

Henry Chungu Ngolwe (born 21 November 1961) is a Zambian sprinter. He competed in the men's 100 metres and 200 metres at the 1984 Summer Olympics.

Ngolwe first represented Zambia internationally at the 1982 Commonwealth Games in the 200 metres. At the Games, he finished 5th in his first-round heat to advance to the quarter-finals, running 22.12 seconds. However, in the next round he ran 22.15 seconds for 6th place and did not advance to the semi-finals. The following year, Ngolwe set his personal best of 10.3 seconds in the 100 m.

In the weeks before the 1984 Olympics, Ngolwe lived in Atlanta, Georgia and stayed at Emory University. He was featured in the men's 100 m at the 1984 Atlanta Summer Track Classic against other African and South American runners before the Games.

Ngolwe qualified for the Los Angeles Olympics in both the 100 m and 200 m. In the 100 m heats on 3 August, Ngolwe ran 10.94 seconds into a headwind, placing 7th and failing to advance. In the 200 m heats three days later, Ngolwe ran 21.58 seconds to place 6th but failed to advance again.

Following the Olympics, Ngolwe went on to win six international medals in African competition. At the inaugural African Zone VI Athletics Championships in 1987, Ngolwe won a bronze medal in the 100 m and silver in the 4 × 100 m relay. At the following year's edition in Gaborone, he won gold medals in the 100 m (in 10.5 seconds) and 4 × 100 m alongside a silver in the 200 m (in 21.2 seconds). At the 1988 East and Central African Championships, Ngolwe also won a bronze medal in the 100 m.
