= Game+ =

Canadian specialty TV channel

- Country: Canada
- Broadcast area: National
- Headquarters: Toronto, Ontario

Ownership
- Owner: Anthem Sports & Entertainment
- Sister channels: GameTV; Fight Network

History
- Launched: March 4, 2014, 11 years ago
- Former names: FNTSY Sports Network (2014-2019)

Links
- Website: Game+

Availability

Streaming media
- Amazon Fire TV (Worldwide): Application
- Apple TV (Worldwide): Application

Game+ is a Canadian English language specialty channel owned by Anthem Sports & Entertainment. Originally launched on March 4, 2014 as FNTSY Sports Network, the channel was relaunched in 2018 as an off-shoot of GameTV.

Game+ primarily airs programming relating to fantasy sports, sports betting, Esports, and poker, as well as outdoor recreation, sports, and sports entertainment.

== History ==
=== As FNTSY Sports Network ===
The channel's origins begin in January 2013, when Anthem Media's subsidiary, Fight Media, was granted approval from the Canadian Radio-television and Telecommunications Commission (CRTC) to launch a television channel called "The League – Fantasy Sports TV," described as "a national, English-language specialty Category B service devoted to fantasy sports, allowing viewers to act as owners and assume all the responsibilities associated with operating real sports franchises, and allowing viewers to create, monitor, trade and discuss players on their teams with others also playing fantasy sports."

In February 2013, Anthem acquired two fantasy sports analysis websites—RotoExperts and SportsGrid—to bolster content for the network. In March 2013, Anthem CEO Leonard Asper told the Toronto Star that the channel was expected to launch that September. He defended the network's concept by noting that "people thought 'How can there be an entire channel devoted to golf?' But now the Golf Channel is in 82 million homes", and that advertisers "leapt out of their chairs" when they learned that the network could appeal to both the traditional "baby boomer" demographic associated with fantasy sports, and the young male demographic that had also increasingly shown interest in fantasy.

Logo as FNTSY Sports Network

In December 2013, it was reported that the channel, now named FNTSY Sports Network, was expected to launch in Canada and the United States in March 2014. On January 14, 2014, Anthem Media announced the launch date for the channel as March 4, 2014. However, it was initially expected to launch only in the U.S. on that date with the Canadian launch limited to only an app and streaming online channel; that's until January 29, 2014 when Anthem Media announced it will launch in Canada the same day as the U.S. through a carriage agreement with MTS. The Canadian channel launched as intended on March 14; however, the channel's American counterpart subsequently launched 3 months later in the U.S. on Cablevision's Optimum TV service.

In 2016, a 20% interest in the channel was sold to a group of various unnamed investors, which would subsequently be resold back to the Anthem at a later date.

=== As Game+ (2018–present) ===
In 2018, Anthem sold the FNTSY Sports Network brand and associated fantasy sports properties to a newly created company called SportsGrid Inc. Anthem would retain the cable television channel and its distribution on Canadian and American television service providers, and maintained the FNTSY Sports Network brand through a transitional licensing agreement until April 1, 2019. On that date, the channel was rebranded as Game+. Plans for a rebrand were initially revealed through Anthem's licence renewal application to the CRTC for the channel. Anthem noted in the application that it had difficulty securing distribution for the channel as a newly created service and decided to rebrand the channel.

In May 2019, Anthem partnered with the Vegas Stats & Information Network to syndicate A Numbers Game and a weekly highlights program on Game+. In 2020, Game+ added the weekly television series of Ohio Valley Wrestling (OVW)—a developmental territory of Anthem's TNA Wrestling, and The Rod Pedersen Show, hosted by former CKRM Saskatchewan Roughriders broadcaster Rod Pedersen.

In October 2022, Game+ added a television version of Room 4-4-2, hosted by Canadian soccer reporter James Sharman. In 2023, Game+ and GameTV began to air LIV Golf.
