= Cameron Sharp =

Scottish sprinter (born 1958)

Personal information
- Nationality: British (Scottish)
- Born: 3 June 1958 (age 68) Irvine, North Ayrshire, Scotland
- Height: 182 cm (6 ft 0 in)
- Weight: 77 kg (170 lb)

Sport
- Sport: Athletics
- Event: Sprints
- Club: Shettleston Harriers, Glasgow
Medal record
Men's athletics
Representing Great Britain
European Championships
Silver medal – second place	1982 Athens	200 m
Representing Scotland
Commonwealth Games
Gold medal – first place	1978 Edmonton	4 × 100 m relay
Bronze medal – third place	1982 Brisbane	100 m
Bronze medal – third place	1982 Brisbane	200 m
Bronze medal – third place	1982 Brisbane	4 × 100 m relay
Bronze medal – third place	1986 Edinburgh	4 × 100 m relay

Robert Cameron Sharp (born 3 June 1958) is a Scottish former sprinter. In 1978, he won a gold medal at the Commonwealth Games in Edmonton in the 4 × 100 m relay alongside David Jenkins, Allan Wells, and Drew McMaster and competed at the 1980 Summer Olympics.

== Biography ==
In 1975, Sharp won the Scottish schoolboys 100 and 200 championships. He went on to compete at the 1980 Summer Olympic Games in Moscow in the 100 m, 200 m where he reached the semi-finals of both sprints, and was a member of the 4 × 100 m relay where the U.K. finished 4th in the final in a new British record.

He became the British 100 metres champion after winning the British AAA Championships title at the 1982 AAA Championships. Later that year he went on to compete in the 1982 Brisbane Commonwealth Games picking up three bronze medals, in the 100 metres, 200 metres, and 4 × 100 metres relay. Also during 1982, he took the silver medal in the 200 m at the European Athletics Championships in Athens in 1982, narrowly losing the gold to East German sprinter Olaf Prenzler, but beating another top East German (Frank Emmelmann, the 100 metre winner) into bronze. Sharp also finished fourth in the 100 metres final, again narrowly missing out on a medal.

He also competed at the 1983 World Championships in Athletics and again reached the semi-finals of both the sprints, narrowly missing out in places of the finals. He was also Scottish 100 m and 200 m champion with a famous 200;m victory over 1980 Olympic champion Allan Wells. Sharp also won the UK Athletics Championships in 1980 and 1981, and was also the AAA's indoor 60 metres champion.

He competed in his third Commonwealth Games in Edinburgh in 1986, where he won another bronze medal with the sprint relay team.

== Personal bests ==
- 100 metres – 10.20 seconds
- 200 metres – 20.47 seconds

== Personal life ==
In 1991 he was involved in a serious car accident which left him physically and mentally disabled. Married to Carol Lightfoot, former Scottish 800 metre runner, and has two daughters, one of whom, Lynsey, competes as an 800-metre runner. Both daughters are national athletics champions.
