= Frigate Bay =

Coordinates: 17°16′N 62°41′W

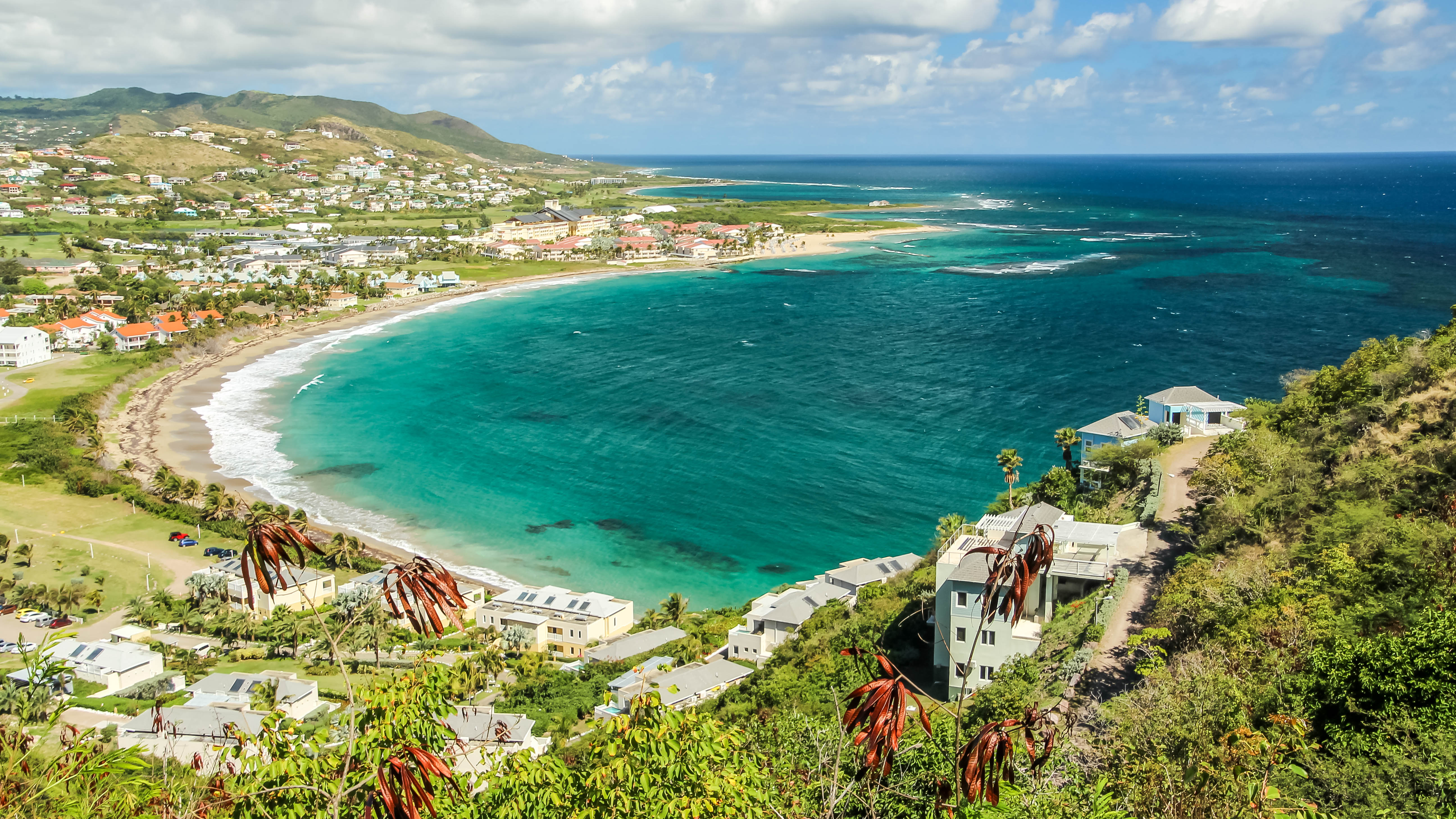
Frigate Bay (2025)

Frigate Bay is the name of two bays located close together on the island of Saint Kitts. The two bays are located southeast of the capital Basseterre, at the northern end of the isthmus joining the Southeast Peninsula with the rest of the island.

Frigate Bay North is extensively developed, and lies against the rougher Atlantic coast of the island. There are several hotels and resorts.

Frigate Bay Beach, on the calmer south coast, is a popular beach with Basseterre locals. It has several bars and restaurants.
