= Suresh John =

Canadian actor

- Occupation: Actor
- Notable work: Mr. D (as Mr. Malik); Patch Town; Save Me

Suresh John is a Canadian actor and stage performer. He is best known for portraying school custodian Mr. Malik on the CBC Television sitcom Mr. D (2012–2018). His film work includes the musical fantasy feature Patch Town (2014), in which critics singled out his comic turn as Sly, and he co-starred in CBC’s digital anthology series Save Me (2017). On stage, John appeared in the Broadway production of Bombay Dreams as a member of the original ensemble.

== Career ==
John joined the cast of Mr. D as the enigmatic custodian Mr. Malik, a recurring character throughout the show’s eight-season run on CBC Television. In 2017 he appeared in the CBC digital series Save Me, created by Fab Filippo, alongside Amy Matysio and other Canadian actors.

In feature films, John played Sly in Patch Town (2014), a role noted by Canadian critics during the film’s festival and theatrical play.

Earlier in his career, John performed on Broadway in Bombay Dreams (2004), credited in the original ensemble and as “Hard Hat”, and served as an understudy for Madan.

== Selected filmography ==
=== Film ===
Year	Title	Role	Notes	Ref.
2014	Patch Town	Sly	Feature film	

=== Television ===
Year	Title	Role	Notes	Ref.
2012–2018	Mr. D	Mr. Malik	Recurring role	
2017	Save Me	—	Digital series (CBC)	

== Stage ==
- Bombay Dreams (Broadway, 2004) – ensemble; “Hard Hat”; understudy for Madan.
