= Craig Considine =

Australian rules footballer

Personal information
- Full name: Craig Anthony Considine
- Born: 18 June 1959 (age 67)
- Original team: Parade CBC
- Height: 184 cm (6 ft 0 in)
- Weight: 88 kg (194 lb)

Playing career^{1}
Years	Club	Games (Goals)
1979	Richmond	7 (1)
- ^{1} Playing statistics correct to the end of 1979.

Craig Anthony Considine (born 18 June 1959) is a former Australian rules footballer who played with Richmond in the Victorian Football League (VFL).

He also competed in the decathlon representing Australia at the 1978 Commonwealth Games.
