= Mary Ormsby =

Canadian journalist and sports editor

Mary Ormsby (born 1960) is a Canadian journalist and sports editor for the Toronto Star. She appeared regularly on the sports talk radio show Prime Time Sports.

== Early life and education ==
She was born in Toronto, Ontario, where she attended St. Richards Catholic Elementary School and Senator O'Connor College School.

After completing grade 12, she received a full scholarship to Ohio State University (OSU) as a member of the women's volleyball team. She was a two-time OSU Scholar-Athlete; team captain in 1979 and co-captain in 1980; an all-Big Ten selection in 1980; led the team to three Ohio Association of Intercollegiate Sports for Women titles; and also led them to the 1979 Minnesota Association of Intercollegiate Athletics for Women regional championship, which was part of a school-record-setting 37-win season. She graduated with a degree in journalism.

== Career ==
She returned to Toronto in the early 1980s to begin a career in sports journalism with the Toronto Sun, was subsequently hired by the Toronto Star in 1985.

In 1987, she wrote an article for the Toronto Star entitled "It's Time for Boorish Footballers to Grow Up", exposing the sexual harassment she experienced while interviewing players in Canadian Football League locker rooms.

In 1995, she was inducted to the new Ohio State University Sports Hall of Fame. She continued to work as a sports reporter and feature writer at the Toronto Star. She retired from the paper in the summer of 2020, although she is still a contributor.

In 2024, she released a book called World's Fastest Man about the life of Canadian sprinter Ben Johnson.

== Personal life ==
Ormsby is married to former Toronto Star hockey writer Paul Hunter. They have four children.
