= Gus McCuaig =

Scottish athlete

Personal information
- Born: Angus McCuaig; 7 January 1958 (age 68) Garelochhead, Scotland

Sport
- Sport: Athletics
- Event: Sprinting
Medal record
Representing Scotland
Commonwealth Games
Bronze medal – third place	1982 Brisbane	4 × 100 m relay

Angus McCuaig (born 7 January 1958) is a Scottish former athlete of the 1980s.

McCuaig, one of four brothers, was born and raised in the town of Garelochhead. In 1981, McCuaig became the first man in 47-years from the West of Scotland to win the New Year Sprint. He had to hand back his cheque in order to retain his amateur status and compete for Scotland at the Commonwealth Games in Brisbane, where he was a member of the bronze medal-winning 4 × 100 metres relay team. In the UK Athletics Championships, he placed as high as third in the sprint events. He was a five-time Scottish AAA 200 metre champion, breaking the record held by Eric Liddell.
