= William Fong =

Samoan hurdler

Personal information
- Nationality: Samoan
- Born: 14 November 1960 (age 65)

Sport
- Sport: Track and field
- Event: 110 metres hurdles

William Fong (born 14 November 1960) is a Samoan hurdler. He competed in the men's 110 metres hurdles at the 1984 Summer Olympics.
