= Charles Dubin =

Canadian jurist

Charles Leonard Dubin
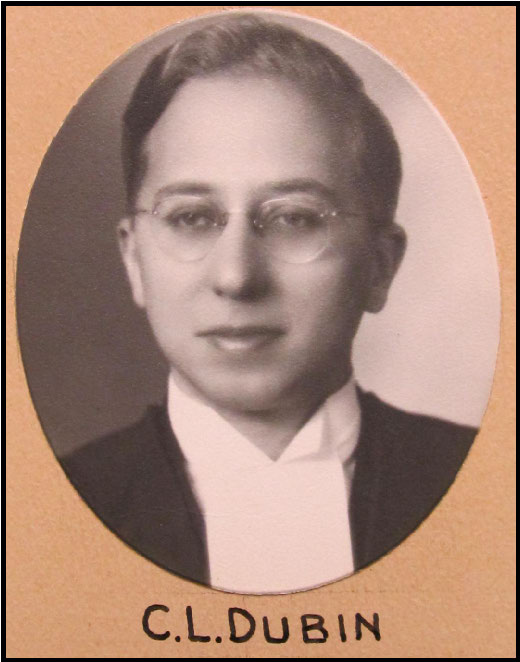
- Born: April 4, 1921; Hamilton, Ontario, Canada
- Died: October 27, 2008 (aged 87); Toronto, Ontario, Canada
- Occupations: Lawyer, jurist

Charles Leonard Dubin OC OOnt QC (April 4, 1921 – October 27, 2008) was a Canadian lawyer and former Chief Justice of Ontario. He led the Dubin inquiry into the use of steroids by athletes.

== Early life ==
Charles Leonard Dubin was born on April 4, 1921, in Hamilton, Ontario, the son of Harry and Ethel Dubin. He received a B.A. from the University of Toronto in 1941 and an LL.B. from Osgoode Hall Law School in 1944. He was called to the Bar of Ontario in June 1944 and was created a King's Counsel in December 1950. In 1945, he married Anne Levine, who died in 2007. They had no children.

== Legal and judicial career ==
He practiced law with the law firm Kimber, Dubin, Brunner & Armstrong which later merged to form Tory Tory DesLauriers & Binnington where he was a counsel and a senior partner. In 1973, he was appointed to the Court of Appeal for Ontario. In 1987, he was appointed Associate Chief Justice and Chief Justice in 1990. He served until 1996 when he rejoined Torys as a counsel.

He served on two royal commissions: the Dubin inquiry (1988) a royal commission regarding the use of performance-enhancing drugs in which sprinter Ben Johnson admitted wrongdoing; and a royal commission regarding safety in aviation (1979).

== Honours ==
In 1997, he was awarded the Order of Ontario and was made an Officer of the Order of Canada in recognition for having made "a profound and lasting effect upon the Canadian judiciary". He was awarded honorary degrees from the University of Toronto, Law Society of Upper Canada, and York University.

Dubin died on October 27, 2008, at Mount Sinai Hospital in Toronto, after being hospitalized for ten days due to bacterial pneumonia. He was buried at Holy Blossom Memorial Park in Toronto.

Legal offices
Preceded by William Goldwin Carrington Howland	Chief Justice of Ontario; 1990–1996	Succeeded by Roy McMurtry
