= Ikpoto Eseme =

Nigerian sprinter (born 1957)

Personal information
- National team: Nigeria
- Born: May 25, 1957 (age 69)
- Occupation: policeman
- Employer: Nigerian Police Force
- Height: 6 ft 1 1/2 in (1.87 m)

Sport
- Country: Nigeria
- Sport: Track and field
- Position: sprinter
- Events: 100 metres; 200 metres; 4 × 100 metres relay
Medal record
Men's athletics
Representing Nigeria
All-Africa Games
Bronze medal – third place	1987 Nairobi	200 m
African Championships
Gold medal – first place	1984 Rabat	4×100 m
Gold medal – first place	1985 Cairo	4×100 m
Silver medal – second place	1984 Rabat	200 m
Bronze medal – third place	1984 Rabat	100 m
Commonwealth Games
Gold medal – first place	1982 Brisbane	4x100 m

Ikpoto Eseme (born 25 May 1957) is a former Nigerian sprinter who competed at international level winning bronze and gold medals. He also worked as a policeman.

== Career ==
At the 1982 Commonwealth Games in Brisbane Eseme, running as anchor, won a gold medal in the 4 x 100 metres relay, with Iziaq Adeyanju, Lawrence Adegbeingbe, and Samson Olajidie Oyeledun. The winning time of 39.15 seconds was a games record. The medal was the only one won by Nigeria in athletics at the games. Eseme also competed in the 100 metres and 200 metres sprints.

At the 1984 Summer Olympics in Los Angeles Eseme competed in the 4 x 100 metres relay.

In 1987, Eseme came first in the 200 metres sprint at the Nigerian Championship held at Lagos. Then, at the 1987 All-Africa Games in Nairobi, he won a bronze medal in the 200 metres sprint.

Eseme, like a number of other Nigerian competitors, also worked for the Nigeria Police Force and competed in the Police Games.

== Awards ==
In 2003 Eseme, along with the other members of the gold medal winning relay team, received a National Sports Merit award from the Nigerian federal government.

In 2014 Eseme received a Retired Officers for Sports Award from the Nigeria Police Force, presented by Mohammed Dikko Abubakar.
