= David Lukuba =

Tanzanian sprinter

Personal information
- Nationality: Tanzanian
- Born: 17 March 1957 (age 69)

Sport
- Sport: Sprinting
- Event: 100 metres
Medal record
Men's athletics
Representing Tanzania
African Championships
Bronze medal – third place	1979 Dakar	4×100 m

David Lukuba (born 17 March 1957) is a Tanzanian sprinter. He competed in the men's 100 metres at the 1980 Summer Olympics.
