= Tony Sharpe =

Canadian sprinter (born 1961)

Personal information
- Born: 28 June 1961 (age 65) Kingston, Jamaica

Sport
- Sport: Track and field
Medal record
Representing Canada
Olympic Games
Bronze medal – third place	1984 Los Angeles	4×100 m relay
Commonwealth Games
Silver medal – second place	1982 Brisbane	4×100 m relay
Summer Universiade
Silver medal – second place	1983 Edmonton	4 x 100 m relay
Pacific Conference Games
Gold medal – first place	1981 Christchurch	4x100 m relay
Pan American Junior Championships
Bronze medal – third place	1980 Sudbury	100 metres
Bronze medal – third place	1980 Sudbury	4x100 m relay

Anthony Sharpe (born 28 June 1961) is a Jamaican-born Canadian former sprinter who won an Olympic bronze medal in the 4 x 100 metres relay and was a finalist in the 100 metres in Los Angeles 1984. In 1982, he set a Canadian record in the 200 metres with a time of 20.22 and ran his personal best 100 metres time in 10.19 seconds. He also won a silver medal in the 4 x 100 metres relay at the 1982 Commonwealth Games. He competed at the first World Championships in 1983.

== Coaching career ==
Sharpe was awarded the Gerry Swan Development Coach of the Year Award for 2014 by Athletics Canada.

He is the head coach of the Speed Academy Athletics Club based in Pickering, Ontario, which he founded in 2006 after leaving a career in corporate sales. The Speed Academy Athletics Club has produced numerous national team members, with eleven of its athletes representing Canada at international competitions in 2015. Sharpe has also developed more than thirty scholarship athletes, including his own twin daughters.

Amongst the athletes Sharpe has coached and mentored is Olympic Gold medalist Andre De Grasse.

Sharpe was selected to the Canadian coaching delegation as the sprints and relay coach for the 2013 Canadian National World Youth Championships team, the 2014 Canadian National World Junior Championships team, and the 2015 Canadian National World Youth Championships team.

== Personal life ==
Sharpe is married to former sprinter Colene Taffe, they have three children, Mitchell Sharpe, Taylor Sharpe & Sommer Sharpe.

== Doping ==
Sharpe trained with the Scarborough Optimist Track Club. Club coach Charlie Francis, working with Dr. George Astaphan, supplied performance-enhancing drugs to Ben Johnson, Desai Williams, Tony Sharpe, Angella Taylor-Issajenko, Mark McKoy and others. After Sharpe testified at the 1989 Dubin inquiry, and admitted to steroid use, he was subsequently suspended from eligibility for federal funding.

During the inquiry, Sharpe admitted to using steroids since he was a student on the Clemson Tigers track and field team. His ban from federal funding was lifted in 2012, allowed him to coach at the national team and Olympic levels.

Upon reinstatement, Mediator Larry Banack wrote this of Sharpe: "The Applicant demonstrated sincerity, contrition, remorse and a passion for the sport of track and field and the promotion of drug-free sport... I am satisfied that the intention and spirit of the Recommendations of the Dubin Inquiry that contemplated possible future reinstatement have been satisfied by the Applicant... I am convinced that the submissions of the Applicant are genuine. It would be inappropriate to prevent such a talented and passionate individual from moving forward to pursue a career which will benefit the sports community as a whole."
