= Dubin inquiry =

Canadian inquiry into sports doping

The Dubin inquiry was a Canadian government Commission of Inquiry into the Use of Drugs and Banned Practices Intended to Increase Athletic Performance held in 1989 after the Ben Johnson doping scandal at the 1988 Seoul Olympics. The commission was given to Ontario Court of Appeal Chief Justice Charles Dubin. He released his report in June 1990.

Dubin wrote that doping "threatened the essential integrity of sport and is destructive of its very objectives", when he issued more than 70 recommendations. Dubin concluded that "the failure of many sport governing bodies to treat the problem more seriously and to take more effective means to detect and deter the use of such drugs has contributed in large measure to the extensive use of drugs in athletes." Dubin said that there was a "moral crisis" in sports that required society to examine the values attached to sport.

Minister of Fitness and Amateur Sport Jean Charest was responsible for Canadian sport at the time of the scandal and afterwards. The body named Sport Canada was officially in charge, and "a predictable result from the shift in goal in Sport Canada from its original mandate in 1967 which was directed to mass participation, academic development through a national advisory committee and support for sport governing bodies in a decentralized volunteer system to its 1988 goal which was to win medals through national sport organizations."
