= Lawrence Adegbeingbe =

Nigerian sprinter (born 1957)

Lawrence Adegbeingbe (born 17 March 1957) is a Nigerian former sprinter who competed in the 1984 Summer Olympics.
