= FNTSY Sports Network =

- Country: United States
- Broadcast area: National

Ownership
- Owner: Sportsgrid Inc.

History
- Launched: Summer 2014

Links
- Website: FNTSY Sports Network

Availability

Streaming media
- Amazon Fire TV (Worldwide): IPTV
- Apple TV (Worldwide): IPTV
- LG Channel Plus (Worldwide): IPTV

FNTSY Sports Network is a multinational over-the-top internet television service owned by Sportsgrid Inc.

The channel primarily syndicates sports talk programming pertaining to fantasy sports, including sports radio-styled programs and vodcasts. It operates as streaming video and internet radio services.

== History ==
Original owners, Anthem Sports and Entertainment, made plans to launch a fantasy sports-related television channel in 2012, when it applied for a Canadian broadcast licence for a channel tentatively named "The League – Fantasy Sports TV," with intentions to launch the channel in both Canada and the United States, however, under separate operations.

In February 2013, Anthem acquired two fantasy sports analysis websites—RotoExperts and SportsGrid—to bolster content for the network. In March 2013, Anthem CEO Leonard Asper told the Toronto Star that the channel was expected to launch that September. He defended the network's concept by noting that "people thought 'How can there be an entire channel devoted to golf?' But now the Golf Channel is in 82 million homes", and that advertisers "leapt out of their chairs" when they learned that the network could appeal to both the traditional "baby boomer" demographic associated with fantasy sports, and the young male demographic that had also increasingly shown interest in fantasy.

In December 2013, it was reported that the channel, now named FNTSY Sports Network, was expected to launch in Canada and the United States in March 2014. On January 14, 2014, Anthem Media announced the launch date for the channel as March 4, 2014 for the United States, with a Canadian launch later in the year. However, only the Canadian channel launched in March 2014, while the American channel would launch later in the summer of 2014 on Cablevision's Optimum TV service.

The channel would subsequently gain wider distribution through obtaining carriage agreements with additional American television service providers, in addition to international providers such as Roku.

In 2018, following its acquisition of e-sports data provider NXTAKE, it was announced that FNTSY Sports Network had merged with the company under the new company SportsGrid, Inc., leaving Anthem with no remaining stake in the company. With the merger, it left FNTSY Sports Network with no remaining distribution on traditional cable, satellite, and IPTV providers in the U.S., as Anthem retained ownership of that distribution network. However, the FNTSY Sports Network channel remained on American television service provider lineups in both Canada and the U.S. through a licensing agreement with Sportsgrid until April 1, 2019, when Anthem rebranded FNTSY Sports Network as Game+ in both America and Canada.

== Programming ==
In March 2018, Craig Carton, who had resigned from WFAN New York's Boomer and Carton morning show in September 2017 after being arrested for charges of securities fraud, joined FNTSY Sports Network to host its new morning show Carton & Friends. In May 2018, the program was picked up for terrestrial radio syndication in partnership with Sports Byline USA. In January 2019, it was announced that the Elvis Duran Group (co-founded by radio personality Elvis Duran) would assume distribution duties for the channel's radio arm Fantasy Sports Radio Network.
