= Ben Johnson (Canadian sprinter) =

Canadian sprinter (born 1961)

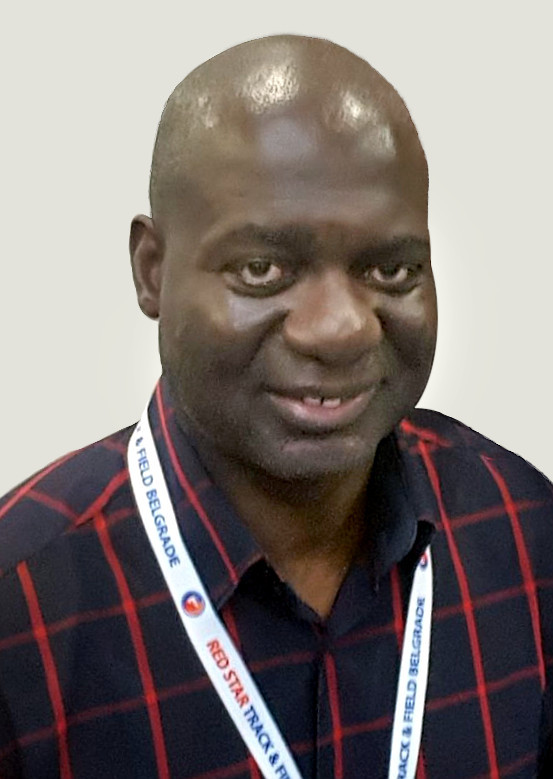
- Johnson in 2017

Personal information
- Full name: Benjamin Sinclair Johnson, Jr.
- Born: December 30, 1961 (age 64) Falmouth, Trelawny Parish, Jamaica
- Height: 177 cm (5 ft 9 1/2 in)
- Weight: 75 kg (165 lb)

Sport
- Country: Canada
- Events: 60 m, 100 m, 200 m

Achievements and titles
- Personal bests: 30 m: 4.40 (2006); 50 m: 5.69 (1984); 55 m: 6.05 (1986); 60 m: 6.50 (1986); 100 m: 9.95 (1986); 200 m: 20.41 (1985)
Medal record
Men's athletics
Representing Canada
Olympic Games
Bronze medal – third place	1984 Los Angeles	100 m
Bronze medal – third place	1984 Los Angeles	4 × 100 m relay
Disqualified	1988 Seoul	100 m
World Championships
Disqualified	1987 Rome	100 m
World Indoor Championships
Gold medal – first place	1985 Paris	60 m
Disqualified	1987 Indianapolis	60 m
Goodwill Games
Gold medal – first place	1986 Moscow	100 m
Commonwealth Games
Gold medal – first place	1986 Edinburgh	100 m
Gold medal – first place	1986 Edinburgh	4 × 100 m relay
Silver medal – second place	1982 Brisbane	100 m
Silver medal – second place	1982 Brisbane	4 × 100 m relay
Bronze medal – third place	1986 Edinburgh	200 m
Universiade
Silver medal – second place	1983 Edmonton	4 × 100 m relay
Pacific Conference Games
Gold medal – first place	1981 Christchurch	4 × 100 m relay
Pan American Junior Championships
Bronze medal – third place	1980 Sudbury	4 × 100 m relay
Representing Americas
World Cup
Gold medal – first place	1985 Canberra	100 m
Silver medal – second place	1985 Canberra	4 × 100 m relay

Benjamin Sinclair Johnson, CM OOnt (born December 30, 1961) is a Canadian former sprinter. During the 1987–88 season he held the title of the world's fastest man, breaking both the 100 m and the 60 m indoor World Records. He won the 100 metres at the 1987 World Championships in Athletics, and again at the 1988 Summer Olympics, but was disqualified for doping and stripped of the gold medals. He was the first to beat the 9.9 and 9.8 seconds barrier.

He won two bronze medals at the 1984 Summer Olympics, as well as gold medals at the 1985 World Indoor Championships, 1986 Goodwill Games and 1986 Commonwealth Games. He was trained by Charlie Francis.

== Biography ==
=== Career background ===
Benjamin Johnson was born in Falmouth, Jamaica, and emigrated to Canada in 1976. He grew up in the Lawrence Heights community of Toronto, before later residing in the suburb of Scarborough, Ontario. His early life was met with challenges regarding his Black immigrant status in a white-dominant society, which built up to lead him to beg his parents to emigrate back; however, he decided to stay.

Johnson met coach Charlie Francis and joined the Scarborough Optimists track and field club, training at York University. Francis was a Canadian 100 metres sprint champion himself (1970, 1971 and 1973) and a member of the Canadian team for the 1972 Summer Olympics in Munich. Francis was also Canada's national sprint coach for nine years.

Johnson's first international success came when he won 2 silver medals at the 1982 Commonwealth Games in Brisbane, Australia. He finished behind Allan Wells of Scotland in the 100 metres with a time of 10.05 seconds and was a member of the Canadian 4 × 100 metres relay team which finished behind Nigeria. This success was not repeated at the 1983 World Championships in Helsinki, where he was eliminated in the semi-finals, finishing 6th with a time of 10.44, nor at the 1983 Pan American Games in Caracas where Johnson placed 5th in the 100 metres final with a time of 10.25.

At the 1984 Summer Olympics in Los Angeles, he reached the 100 metres final; after a false start, he won the bronze medal behind Carl Lewis and Sam Graddy with a time of 10.22. He also won a bronze medal with the Canadian 4 × 100 m relay team of Johnson, Tony Sharpe, Desai Williams and Sterling Hinds, who ran a time of 38.70. By the end of the 1984 season, Johnson had established himself as Canada's top sprinter, and on August 22 in Zürich, Switzerland, he bettered Williams' Canadian record of 10.17 by running 10.12.

In 1985, after eight consecutive losses, Johnson finally beat Carl Lewis. Other success against Lewis included the 1986 Goodwill Games, where Johnson beat Lewis, running 9.95 for first place, against Lewis' third-place time of 10.06. He broke Houston McTear's seven-year-old world record in the 60 metres in 1986, with a time of 6.50 seconds. He also won Commonwealth gold at the 1986 games in Edinburgh, beating Linford Christie for the 100 metres title with a time of 10.07. Johnson also led the Canadian 4 × 100 metres relay team to gold, and won a bronze in the 200 metres. Also in 1986, Canadian sprinter Mike Dwyer expressed concern that the use of drugs had reached "epidemic proportions" among Canadian sprinters, particularly among those who trained in the Toronto area. Atlee Mahorn also speculated that many sprinters were on steroids.

On April 29, 1987, Johnson was invested as a Member of the Order of Canada. "World record holder for the indoor 60-metre run, this Ontarian has proved himself to be the world's fastest human being and has broken Canadian, Commonwealth and World Cup 100-metre records," it read. "Recipient of the Norton Crowe Award for Male Athlete of the Year for 1985, 'Big Ben' was the winner of the 1986 Lou Marsh Trophy as Canada's top athlete."

By the time of the 1987 World Championships, Johnson had won his four previous races with Lewis and had established himself as the best 100 metres sprinter. At Rome, Johnson gained instant world fame and confirmed this status when he beat Lewis for the title, setting a new world record of 9.83 seconds as well, beating Calvin Smith's former record by a full tenth of a second.

After Rome, Johnson became a lucrative marketing celebrity. According to coach Charlie Francis, after breaking the world record, Johnson earned about $480,000 a month in endorsements. Johnson won both the Lou Marsh Trophy and Lionel Conacher Award, and was named the Associated Press Athlete of the Year for 1987.

Following Johnson's defeat of Lewis in Rome, Lewis started trying to explain away his defeat. He first claimed that Johnson had false-started, then he alluded to a stomach virus which had weakened him. Finally, without naming names, Lewis said "There are a lot of people coming out of nowhere. I don't think they are doing it without drugs." This was the start of Lewis' calling on the sport of track and field to be cleaned up in terms of the illegal use of performance-enhancing drugs. While cynics noted that the problem had been in the sport for many years, they pointed out that it did not become a cause for Lewis until he was actually defeated, with some also pointing to Lewis's egotistical attitude and lack of humility. During a controversial interview with the BBC, Lewis said:

There are gold medallists at this meet who are on drugs, that [100 metres] race will be looked at for many years, for more reasons than one.

Johnson's response was:

When Carl Lewis was winning everything, I never said a word against him. And when the next guy comes along and beats me, I won't complain about that either.

This set up the rivalry leading into the 1988 Olympic Games.

In 1988, Johnson experienced a number of setbacks to his running career. In February of that year he pulled a hamstring, and in May he aggravated the same injury. Meanwhile, in Paris in June, Lewis ran a 9.99. Then in Zurich, Switzerland on August 17, the two faced each other for the first time since the 1987 World Championships; Lewis won in 9.93, while Johnson finished third in 10.00. "The gold medal for the (Olympic) 100 metres is mine," Carl Lewis said. "I will never again lose to Johnson."

=== Olympic Games and subsequent disqualification ===
On September 24, 1988, Johnson won the 100 metres final at the Summer Olympics in Seoul, lowering his own world record to 9.79 seconds. He was the first Canadian sprinter since Percy Williams in 1928 to win the 100 metres at the Olympics. Johnson later remarked that he would have been even faster if he hadn't raised his hand in the air just before he hit the tape.

However, Park Jong-sei of the Olympic Doping Control Center found that Johnson's urine sample contained stanozolol, and he was disqualified three days after the race. He later admitted having used steroids when he ran his 1987 world record, which caused the IAAF to rescind that record as well. Johnson and coach Francis complained that they used performance-enhancing agents in order to remain on equal footing with the other top athletes. In testimony before the Dubin inquiry into drug use in sport, Francis charged that Johnson was only one of many cheaters, and he just happened to get caught. Often dubbed "the dirtiest race in history," the 1988 100 m final had only two out of a total of eight runners who remained clean throughout their careers (Calvin Smith and Robson da Silva).

Johnson's coach, Charlie Francis, a vocal critic of the IOC testing procedures, is the author of Speed Trap, which features Johnson heavily. In the book, he freely admits that his athletes were taking anabolic steroids, as he claims all top athletes at the time were, and also claims that Johnson could not possibly have tested positive for that particular steroid since Johnson actually preferred furazabol. He thought stanozolol made his body "feel tight". The numerous athletes using performance-enhancing drugs at the time understood how long before a race, and possible drug test, they should stop using the drugs. Johnson later claimed that André A. Jackson, Lewis' Santa Monica Track Club teammate, who was inside the drug testing room in Seoul, may have placed the stanozolol in one of the beers Johnson drank in order to make urine for his test. He admitted he gave him beer. His response to the stanozolol blame: "Of course I can say I didn't. But I can also say I did, too. What's the benefit?"

During an interview on the Toronto Mike'd Podcast, Johnson said the fact he switched sponsorships from Adidas to Diadora may have been a factor in having his medal stripped. Johnson suggested Adidas athletes were more protected versus athletes aligned with smaller companies like Diadora.

On 28 September 2018, the Toronto Star ran an article on the lab report which was created on Johnson's sample during the 1988 Olympic Games. It was produced by the IOC Doping Control Center in Seoul two days after Johnson handed in a urine sample taken after the 100 m final. The newspaper concluded that the assumed substance Stanozolol was traceable, but "inconsistencies" are found in the report. The Toronto Star article goes on to state that no Canadian Olympic team official saw the lab report in Seoul. The lab report was requested by Canada's chief medical officer, Dr. William Stanish. The Canadian team did not object after the IOC Medical Commission assured "that its testing methods were unassailable."

==== Canadian reaction ====
Canadians initially rejoiced in the reflected glory of winning the gold medal and breaking the world record. Canadian Prime Minister Brian Mulroney watched Johnson set the new world record and after the race congratulated him over the phone. "It's a marvellous evening for Canada," Mulroney said in the televised conversation. Newspapers covered the occasion by concocting words such as "Benfastic" (Toronto Star, September 25, 1988) to describe it.

Two days later, Canadians witnessed the downfall of Johnson, when he was stripped of his gold medal and world record. Mark Tewksbury, a Canadian Olympic swimmer hung a bed sheet banner out of his Olympic Village apartment window expressing 'Hero to Zero in 9.79'. In the first week following the disqualification, Canadian newspapers devoted several pages a day to the story. One headline right after the exposure asked "Why, Ben?" (Toronto Sun, September 26, 1988). Because of the Olympic scandal, the Canadian news agency Canadian Press named Johnson "Newsmaker of the Year" for 1988.

=== Competitors implicated in doping controversies ===
Johnson was not the only participant whose success was questioned: Carl Lewis had tested positive at the Olympic Trials for pseudoephedrine, ephedrine and phenylpropanolamine. Lewis defended himself, claiming that he had accidentally consumed the banned substances. After the supplements that he had taken were analyzed to prove his claims, the USOC accepted his claim of inadvertent use, since a dietary supplement he ingested was found to contain "Ma huang", the Chinese name for Ephedra (ephedrine is known to help weight loss). Fellow Santa Monica Track Club teammates Joe DeLoach and Floyd Heard were also found to have the same banned stimulants in their systems, and were cleared to compete for the same reason.

The highest level of the stimulants Lewis recorded was 6 ppm, which was regarded as a positive test in 1988 but is now regarded as negative test. The acceptable level has been raised to 10 parts per million for ephedrine and twenty-five parts per million for other substances. According to the IOC rules at the time, positive tests with levels lower than 10 ppm were cause of further investigation but not immediate ban. Neal Benowitz, a professor of medicine at UC San Francisco who is an expert on ephedrine and other stimulants, agreed that "These [levels] are what you'd see from someone taking cold or allergy medicines and are unlikely to have any effect on performance."

Following Exum's revelations the IAAF acknowledged that at the 1988 Olympic Trials the USOC indeed followed the correct procedures in dealing with eight positive findings for ephedrine and ephedrine-related compounds in low concentration.

Linford Christie was found to have metabolites of pseudoephedrine in his urine after a 200 m heat at the same Olympics, but was later cleared of any wrongdoing. Of the top five competitors in the race, only former world record holder and eventual bronze medalist Calvin Smith never failed a drug test during his career. Smith later said: "I should have been the gold medalist."

==== The Dubin Inquiry ====
After the Seoul test, Johnson initially denied doping, but, testifying before the 1989 Dubin inquiry, a Canadian government investigation into drug abuse, he admitted that he had lied. Charlie Francis, his coach, told the inquiry that Johnson had been using steroids since 1981. Before that, his personal best (without drugs) was 10.25 which was good for a teenager back then, fast enough for third place in the Weltklasse Zürich meeting 1985 and 1986, for instance.

In Canada, the federal government established the Commission of Inquiry Into the Use of Drugs and Banned Practices Intended to Increase Athletic Performance, headed by Ontario Appeal Court Chief Justice Charles Dubin. The Dubin Inquiry (as it became known), which was televised live, heard hundreds of hours of testimony about the widespread use of performance-enhancing drugs among athletes. The inquiry began in January 1989 and lasted 91 days, with 122 witnesses called, including athletes, coaches, sport administrators, IOC representatives, doctors and government officials.

=== Comeback ===
In 1991, after his suspension ended, he attempted a comeback. He returned to the track for the Hamilton Indoor Games in 1991 and was greeted by the largest crowd to ever attend an indoor Canadian track and field event. More than 17,000 people saw him finish second in the 50 metres in 5.77 seconds.

He failed to qualify for the 1991 World Championships in Tokyo but made the Canadian Olympic team again in 1992 in Barcelona, Spain after finishing second at the Canadian Olympic trials to Bruny Surin. He missed the 100 metre finals at the Olympics, however, finishing last in his semi-final heat after stumbling out of the blocks.

In 1993, he won the 50 metres on January 7 in Grenoble, France, in 5.65 seconds, just 0.04 seconds shy of the world record. However, he was again found guilty of doping just after the race – this time for excess testosterone – and was subsequently banned for life by the IAAF. Federal amateur sport minister Pierre Cadieux called Johnson a national disgrace, and suggested he consider moving back to Jamaica. Johnson commented that it was "by far the most disgusting comment [he had] ever heard". In April 1999, a Canadian adjudicator ruled that there were procedural errors in Johnson's lifetime ban and allowed him to appeal. The decision meant Johnson could technically run in Canada but nobody would compete against him. They would be considered "contaminated" by the IAAF and could also face sanctions. On June 12, 1999, Johnson entered a track meet in Kitchener, Ontario, and was forced to run alone, against the clock. He posted a time of 11.0 seconds. In late 1999, Johnson failed a drug test for the third time by testing positive for hydrochlorothiazide, a banned diuretic that can be used to mask the presence of other drugs. Johnson had not competed since 1993 and had arranged the test himself as part of his efforts to be reinstated.

In 1999, Johnson made headlines again when it was revealed that he had been hired by Libyan leader Muammar Gaddafi to act as a personal trainer for his son, Al-Saadi Gaddafi, who aspired to join Perugia, an Italian football club. Al-Saadi ultimately did join Perugia but was sacked after one game when he failed a drug test. Johnson's publicist in Canada had predicted in The Globe and Mail that his training of the young Gaddafi would earn Johnson a Nobel Peace Prize.

=== Late 1990s and beyond ===
Johnson briefly acted as trainer for Argentine football player Diego Maradona in 1997. This occurred at York University, Toronto.

In 1998, Johnson appeared in a charity race in Charlottetown, Prince Edward Island, where he raced against a thoroughbred race horse, a harness racing horse and a stock car. Johnson finished third in the race.

According to a 1998 article in Outside magazine, Johnson spent much of the latter part of the 1990s living downstairs in the house he shared with his mother Gloria. He spent his leisure time reading, watching movies, and taking his mother to church. He lived in a spacious home in Newmarket, Ontario's Stonehaven neighborhood. He claims to have lost his Ferrari when he used it as collateral for a loan from an acquaintance in order to make a house payment. His mother died of cancer in 2004 and Johnson lived with his sister afterwards.

Shortly after his leaving Libya, it was reported that Johnson had been robbed of $7,300 by a Romani gang in Rome. His wallet was taken, containing $7,300 in cash, the proceeds of his pay for training Gaddafi. Johnson gave chase, but was unable to catch them after they vanished into a metro station.

In May 2005, Johnson launched a clothing and sports supplement line, the Ben Johnson Collection. The motto for Johnson's clothing line was "Catch Me"; however, the clothing line never caught on.

In a January 1, 2006 interview, Johnson claimed that he was sabotaged by a "Mystery Man" inside the doping control room immediately following the 100 metres final in Seoul. He also stated that 40% of people in the sports world are still taking drugs to improve their performance.

In August 2008, Johnson filed a $37 million lawsuit against the estate of his former lawyer Ed Futerman, claiming Futerman made unauthorized payments from his trust account to pay bills and 20 percent commissions to a hairdresser recruited by the lawyer to act as the sprinter's sports agent. In 2012, the lawsuit was dismissed by the Ontario Superior Court by summary judgment on the basis that "there were no genuine issues raised requiring a trial".

At present, Johnson lives in Markham, Ontario, and spends much of his time with his daughter and granddaughter. He also continues to coach, notably with New Jersey Devils defenceman P. K. Subban. In 2010, he released his autobiography entitled Seoul to Soul. In the self-published book, Johnson reviews his childhood in Jamaica, and his early bout with malaria. A Canadian Press article described the book as "an unconventional sports autobiography."

=== Rivalry with Carl Lewis ===
The duels between the two competitors reached immense popularity, fans all over the world watched the duels with excitement. They matched 17 times. Lewis won the first eight, then Johnson won seven out of nine races. In all these years only one short verbal exchange between them is known. They were very different in various aspects. They came from different countries; one from Canada, one from the USA. While Ben grew up poor, Carl's parents both went to college. Ben liked to party with his other rivals and had the reputation of a ladies' man; Carl on the other hand did not party often and was not as popular among the other athletes. Ben was incredible in the first 60 metres and had difficulties in the last 10 where Lewis was the fastest one. Carl benefited from his elegance and speed endurance whereas Johnson had impressive strength. He could bench press 165 kg, weighing only 72.

== Advertising career ==
In March 2006, television spots featuring Johnson advertising an energy drink, "Cheetah Power Surge", started to receive some airtime. Some pundits questioned whether Johnson was an appropriate spokesperson for an all natural energy drink considering his history of steroid use. One ad is a mock interview between Johnson and Frank D'Angelo, the president and chief executive of D'Angelo Brands, which makes the drink, in which he asks Johnson: "Ben, when you run, do you Cheetah?" "Absolutely," says Johnson. "I Cheetah all the time." The other commercial includes Johnson and a cheetah, the world's fastest land animal, and encourages viewers to "go ahead and Cheetah."

In May 2017, Johnson appeared in an advertising campaign for Australia's leading mobile bookmaker, Sportsbet. The campaign launched Sportsbet's new Android app, with Johnson cheekily saying it "has tested positive for speed and power, again and again". The campaign tagline was "Putting the 'Roid in Android" and concluded with Johnson in the starters' block on a racing track, telling punters to "get on it!" The advertisement was pulled after complaints from various parties.

== Documentaries ==
The CBC Radio documentary series Rewind broadcast an episode titled Ben Johnson: A Hero Disgraced on September 19, 2013, for the 25th anniversary of the race, revealing 20 athletes tested positive for drugs but were cleared by the IOC at the 1988 Seoul Olympics. An International Olympic Committee (IOC) official told the CBC that endocrine profiles done at those games indicated that 80 percent of the track and field athletes tested showed evidence of long-term steroid use, although few were banned or had their medals stripped.

In October 2012, ESPN and the BBC dual-financed a documentary entitled 9.79*, which explores the doping scandal of Ben Johnson at the 1988 Summer Olympic 100 metre final.

In 2025, Paramount+ and GameTV ordered a satirical docudrama miniseries on Johnson, Hate the Player: The Ben Johnson Story, from Anthony Q. Farrell and New Metric Media.

== See also ==
- List of doping cases in athletics
- Men's 100 metres world record progression

Awards
Preceded by Diego Maradona	United Press International; Athlete of the Year; 1987	Succeeded by Matt Biondi
Preceded by Yuriy Syedikh	Men's Track & Field Athlete of the Year; 1987	Succeeded by Sergey Bubka
