= Sportsnet 360 =

Canadian television channel

- Sportsnet 360 logo

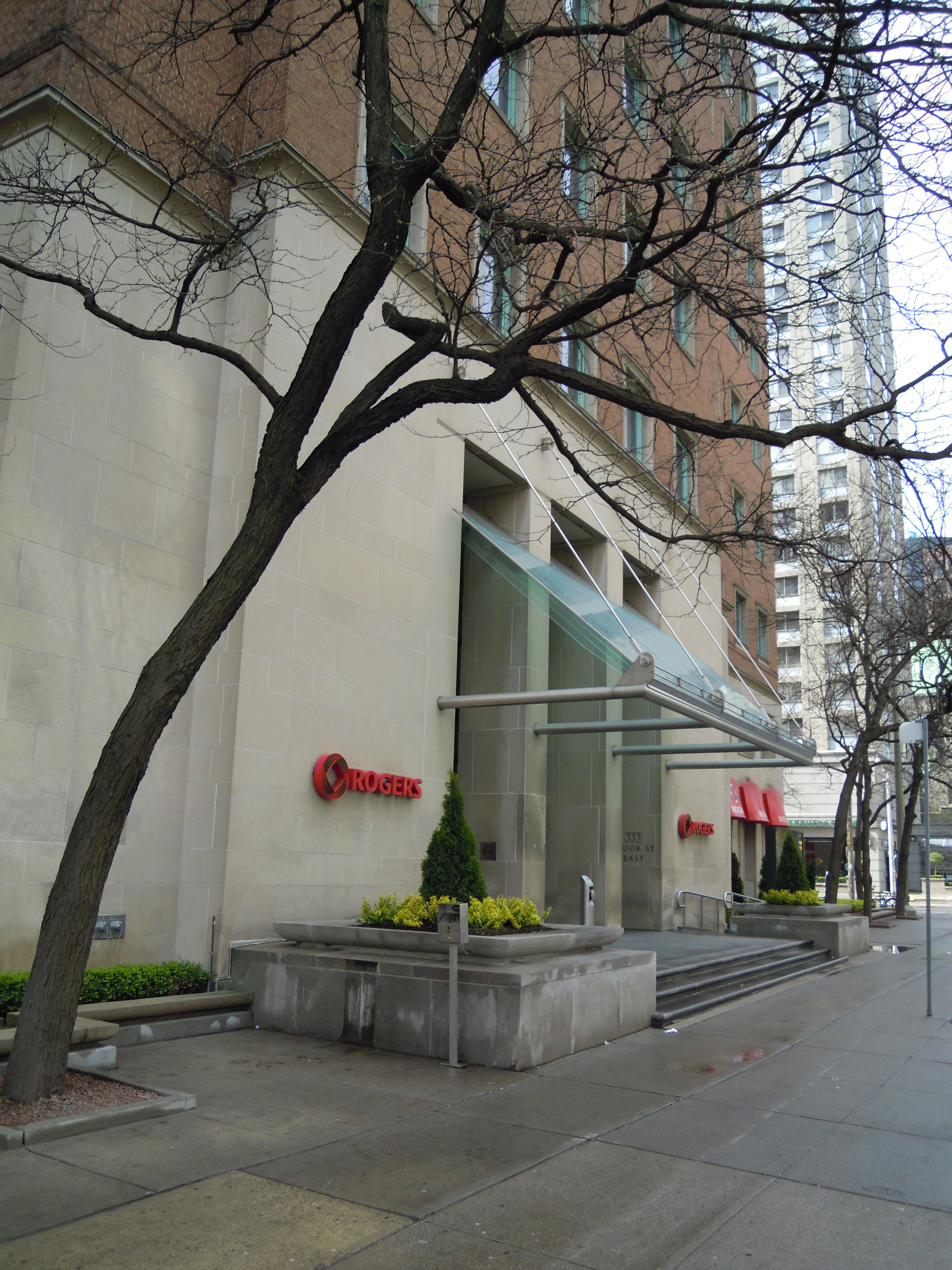
- Sportsnet 360 is based out of the Rogers Building in downtown Toronto
- Country: Canada
- Broadcast area: National
- Headquarters: Rogers Building, Toronto, Ontario

Programming
- Language: English
- Picture format: 480i (SDTV); 1080i (HDTV)

Ownership
- Owner: Score Media (1994–2013); Rogers Sports & Media (2013–present) (Sportsnet 360 Television Inc.)
- Sister channels: Sportsnet; Sportsnet One; Sportsnet World; WWE Network (closed)

History
- Launched: 1994 (as licence-exempt service); May 1997 (as licensed channel)
- Former names: Sportscope (1994–1997); Headline Sports (1997–2000); The Score Television Network (2000–2013)

Links
- Website: Sportsnet 360

Sportsnet 360 (SN360) is a Canadian discretionary specialty channel owned by Rogers Sports & Media. The channel primarily broadcasts automated blocks of sports news and highlights, along with live sports coverage as an overflow channel for Sportsnet's national programming.

The channel was launched in 1994 as the licence-exempt service Sportscope, which featured a display of sports news and scores. In 1997, the network was re-launched under Canadian Radio-television and Telecommunications Commission (CRTC) licensing as Headline Sports, adding anchored segments to its rolling sports news programming. In 2000, the network gained the ability to air occasional broadcasts of live sporting events, and was re-launched as The Score Television Network. In 2012, the network's parent company Score Media announced that it would sell the network to Rogers Communications, which owns the competing Sportsnet family of sports television networks; in 2013, the network was re-branded as Sportsnet 360.

Sportsnet 360 is also Rogers' main linear channel for combat sports programming, as Canadian broadcaster of WWE's flagship professional wrestling programs (WWE Raw, SmackDown, and NXT) from the late 2000s to 2024; as well as TNA (Impact!) starting from 2025, and UFC mixed martial arts events in 2013–14 and again since 2024.

As of 2014, Sportsnet 360 is available in 5.8 million Canadian homes.

== History ==
=== Sportscope, Headline Sports ===
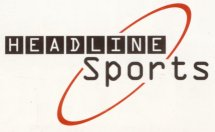
Logo as Headline Sports (1997-2000)

The channel has its origins in Sportscope, a sports news service for cable television providers launched in 1994. Its programming consisted solely of an alphanumeric text rotation of sports scores, news, and sports betting information. As it did not include any video content, it did not require a license from the Canadian Radio-television and Telecommunications Commission (CRTC) to operate.

On September 4, 1996, Sportscope was granted a licence from the CRTC for "Sportscope Plus", an expansion of the service into a specialty channel capable of carrying video programming. The channel planned to carry anchored blocks of sports news and highlights, accompanied by a ticker with updated sports scores and headlines. Sportscope disclosed plans for localized tickers and additional streams of alphanumeric data. The expanded service launched in May 1997 as Headline Sports.

=== The Score ===
Logo as The Score (2002–2013)

In March 2000, the CRTC approved an amendment to Headline Sports' license allowing it to carry limited live programming, provided that it operate in a manner that still prioritizes its licensed format as a sports news and information service. This included continuing to display the ticker during all programming, and breaking away from live programming at least once every 15 minutes to present video highlights.

To promote the expansion, and due to trademark issues with Turner Broadcasting over the "Headline Sports" name (as CNN Headline News aired sports segments carrying the name), the channel was rebranded as The Score Television Network (or simply The Score) that year.

On June 6, 2006, The Score launched a high definition simulcast, available through all major television providers in Canada. On September 3, 2008, the channel began broadcasting from a new studio on the corner of King and Peter in Downtown Toronto. In the 2007–08 season, The Score acquired the Canadian television rights to the Premier League. The network sub-licensed the majority of the package to long-time rightsholder Rogers Sportsnet, which carried a weekly match on Saturdays, and all other matches on its newly launched premium service Setanta Sports Canada. The Score would broadcast a weekly match on Sundays, and launched the bi-weekly studio program The Footy Show.

On September 20, 2011, Score Media announced that it would put The Score Television Network up for sale.

=== Purchase by Rogers, relaunch as Sportsnet 360 ===
Reports surfaced on August 24, 2012, that Rogers Media, owners of the competing network Sportsnet, would acquire The Score's parent company. The following day, Rogers Media announced that it acquired Score Media in a transaction valued at $167 million. Pending CRTC approval, Rogers acquired Score Media's television business which included the closed captioning service Voice to Visual Inc., mixed martial arts promotion The Score Fighting Series, and The Score Television Network.

The acquisition closed on October 19, 2012, at which point Score Media's digital assets (the website theScore.com and associated mobile apps) were spun off into another company primarily owned by Score Media's previous shareholders, theScore Inc., in which Rogers Media retained a 10% interest. Score Media's television properties were immediately placed into a blind trust, pending final CRTC approval. As part of CRTC requirements to spend 10% of the value of an acquisition on initiatives to strengthen the broadcasting industry, Rogers planned to fund the organization and broadcast of the "Sportsnet Winter Games" (which would have been an annual winter sports competition) and provide funding for the production of amateur sports programming. While Rogers planned to continue running The Score as a sports news service, it also requested that the CRTC ease some of the restrictions that were placed on the network in order to allow it to be more competitive with other Canadian sports channels. Namely, Rogers requested that it only be required to air one sports news update per-hour during live programming.

On April 30, 2013, the CRTC approved the acquisition of The Score by Rogers, as well as an amendment to its license to reduce the required number of sports updates during live programs to once per-hour. The CRTC rejected its proposal to spend its tangible benefits on the Sportsnet Winter Games. Immediately following the approval, it was announced that The Score would begin airing Hockey Central Playoff Extra (a spin-off of Sportsnet's NHL news program) nightly during the 2013 Stanley Cup playoffs, and the network replaced its afternoon programming with a telecast of Tim & Sid, a radio show on Rogers-owned CJCL hosted by former The Score personalities Tim Micallef and Sid Seixeiro.

On June 4, 2013, Rogers announced that it would relaunch The Score under the Sportsnet brand as Sportsnet 360 on July 1, 2013; it was launched with a simulcast of a Toronto Blue Jays baseball game, followed by the premiere of the new post-game show, Blue Jays Xpress. Alongside the rebranding, an updated version of The Score's on-screen sports ticker was introduced. Rogers stated that the network would continue to target its programming towards "hardcore" sports fans with "a vast breadth of premium sports content in a fast-paced, energetic and entertaining manner".

== Programming ==
Sportsnet 360 currently serves as a secondary outlet for Sportsnet's national programming alongside Sportsnet One, carrying a mix of full-length programs, and overflow and simulcasted sports programming from other Sportsnet channels. Its weekday daytime lineup currently features television simulcasts of sports radio programs (including By the Books from VSiN, and The Raptors Show, The Fan Hockey Show, Blair & Barker, Real Kyper & Bourne, and The Fan Pregame from co-owned CJCL) and highlights compilation shows.

The channel has primarily served as the main home for combat sports and professional wrestling programming within the Sportsnet family of networks, currently airing Ultimate Fighting Championship (UFC) and Total Nonstop Action Wrestling (TNA). Sportsnet 360 had historically served as the Canadian home of WWE programming, in a relationship dating back to its time as The Score. After the Rogers acquisition, Sportsnet renewed the contract in 2014 under a ten-year deal, which also included Canadian distribution rights to WWE Network. This contract concluded at the end of 2024, with all WWE content moving to Netflix in Canada starting in January 2025, as part of its acquisition of exclusive international rights to WWE Raw. On December 22, 2024, Rogers announced a multi-year deal with TNA—owned by Canadian broadcaster Anthem Sports & Entertainment—to air its programming (including flagship weekly series TNA Impact!) on Sportsnet 360 beginning on January 2, 2025.

UFC mixed-martial arts, including UFC on Fox events, preliminary fights, and the reality series The Ultimate Fighter, largely moved from the Sportsnet regional networks and Sportsnet One to Sportsnet 360 following its launch. On December 22, 2014, it was announced that TSN and Fight Network would take over Canadian rights to UFC programming beginning in 2015. Sportsnet regained the UFC rights starting in January 2024, with programming once again primarily airing on Sportsnet 360.

Sportsnet 360 aired a simulcast of CJCL's Tim & Sid from the acquisition of The Score by Rogers in 2013 until 2015, when the show relaunched on Sportsnet with a television-oriented format. The channel then began simulcasting their replacement Brady & Walker (which had moved from mornings) until February 2016, after Greg Brady was fired from the station. Prime Time Sports also aired on Sportsnet 360 until the show's end in October 2019; the station then joined the main Sportsnet channels in simulcasting Tim & Sid once again, after the show was given an audio simulcast on CJCL as a replacement for Prime Time Sports.

Sportsnet 360 formerly broadcast regular season events in U Sports football and basketball. In August 2014, Sportsnet announced that it would not renew its Ontario University Athletics conference television contracts for the 2014 season because of low viewership and the resulting high cost-per-viewer of producing the game broadcasts.

== See also ==
- ESPNews
- RDS Info
