= Score Media =

Former Canadian media company

Score Media Inc.
- Formerly: Headline Media Group
- Type: Public company
- Traded as: Formerly TSX: SCR
- Industry: Media
- Founded: 1997; 29 years ago
- Defunct: 30 April 2013; 13 years ago
- Fate: Acquired by Rogers Communications; some assets spun off as theScore Inc.
- Successor: theScore Inc. Rogers Media
- Headquarters: Toronto, Ontario, Canada
- Key people: John S. Levy, Founder
- Products: Broadcasting
- Revenue: ▲$7.73 million CAD
- Owner: Levy family (74.07%); Alliance Atlantis/Canwest (25.93%)
- Website: Formerly www.scoremedia.ca

Score Media Inc. was a Canadian media company. Its main asset was The Score, a national specialty television service providing sports news, information, highlights, live events, and other sports-related entertainment programming. The company also owned closed captioning service Voice to Visual Inc., and mixed martial arts promotion The Score Fighting Series.

Prior to October 19, 2012, the company also owned a 20% stake in mobile and web development firm NuLayer, and various digital properties including ScoreMobile, ScoreMobile FC, SportsTap and TheScore.ca. The company also previously owned and operated The Score Satellite Radio on Sirius Satellite Radio (which shut down on September 1, 2011), and stakes in the LGBTQ+ specialty channel OUTtv.

Canwest held a nearly 48% stake in the company that had originally been acquired by Alliance Atlantis, and sold in 2009 amid its financial issues. In October 2012, Score Media announced its intent to sell its television business to Rogers Media, owner of the Sportsnet networks. It concurrently spun off its digital assets as the new company theScore Inc. (now Score Media and Gaming), which was acquired by Penn Entertainment in 2021.

== History ==
The company was originally formed in 1994 as Sportscope Television Network, Ltd., which was founded by John Levy with Clairvest Group as its majority shareholder. Its namesake was the Canadian cable channel Sportscope, which displayed a feed of sports news, scores, and betting information. As the channel only carried "alphanumeric" content and not television programming, it was exempt from Canadian Radio-television and Telecommunications Commission (CRTC) licensing requirements.

In 1996, Sportscope received CRTC approval to launch a new specialty channel known as Sportscope Plus, which would enable the service to also carry video highlights and anchored programming. Sportscope Plus launched in 1997 as Headline Sports, later renamed The Score.

In 1998, the company acquired the rights to produce the Toronto Blue Jays' radio network, under the Headline Sports Radio banner with CJCL as flagship station. In 1999, Alliance Atlantis acquired a 47.85% stake in the company, after the CRTC rejected a bid by Shaw Communications due to undue preference concerns. Chairman Michael MacMillan considered the channel complimentary to its other major specialty channels such as Showcase. In 2000, the company performed a reverse takeover of Old Canada Investment to go public as Headline Media Group, with Levy and Alliance Atlantis remaining shareholders.

In 2001, Headline Media Group launched the digital cable network PrideVision (now OUTtv), the first Canadian specialty channel devoted to the LGBTQ+ community; Alliance Atlantis was to originally hold a 30% stake in the channel, but sold this interest to Headline Media Group prior to launch. In 2003, Headline Media Group sold a majority stake in the channel to a consortium led by William Craig.

Canwest would acquire Alliance Atlantis, and in turn its stake in Score Media, in 2007; Canwest would subcontract The Score to produce the sportscast on Global Ontario's newscasts after the station shut down its in-house sports department. In February 2009, Canwest sold its stake in Score Media back to the company amid its financial struggles.

In 2011, Score Media declared its intent to sell The Score; The Globe and Mail noted that Score Media's digital properties—including its mobile apps—had been a more lucrative property with the increasing cost of media rights to sporting events. On October 19, 2012, Score Media announced that it would sell its television assets to Rogers Media, and placed The Score into a blind trust pending CRTC approval of its sale to Rogers; the remainder of the company's digital media assets would be spun off as theScore Inc.. The sale of The Score Television Network was approved in April 2013, after which it began to be integrated into Rogers' Sportsnet group. The channel was rebranded as Sportsnet 360 on July 1, 2013.

In August 2021, Penn National Gaming acquired theScore Inc., by then renamed Score Media and Gaming, for US$2 billion.
