= Milton Francisco =

Brazilian athlete

Personal information
- Full name: Milton Riitano Francisco
- Born: 9 May 1963 (age 62)

Sport
- Sport: Athletics
- Event: High jump

Milton Riitano Francisco (born 9 May 1963) is a retired Brazilian athlete who specialised in the high jump. He represented his country at the 1987 World Championships without reaching the final.

His personal best in the event is 2.22 metres set in São Paulo in 1987.

== International competitions ==
Year	Competition	Venue	Position	Notes
Representing Brazil
1979	South American Youth Championships	Cochabamba, Bolivia	1st	1.90 m
1980	Pan American Junior Championships	Sudbury, Canada	8th	1.95 m
1980	South American Junior Championships	Santiago, Chile	1st	2.10 m
1981	South American Junior Championships	Rio de Janeiro, Brazil	1st	2.12 m
1982	Pan American Junior Championships	Barquisimeto, Venezuela	6th	2.05 m
1985	South American Championships	Santiago, Chile	1st	2.17 m
1987	World Championships	Rome, Italy	29th (q)	2.10 m
1987	South American Championships	São Paulo, Brazil	3rd	2.14 m
1988	Ibero-American Championships	Mexico City, Mexico	7th	2.10 m
1989	South American Championships	Medellín, Colombia	1st	2.15 m
1990	Ibero-American Championships	Manaus, Brazil	4th	2.15 m
