= Sueli Machado =

Personal information
- Full name: Sueli Ferreira Machado
- Born: 2 April 1963 (age 63)

Sport
- Sport: Athletics
- Event(s): 100 m, 200 m

Sueli Ferreira Machado (born 2 April 1963) is a retired Brazilian sprinter. She won several medals at the continental level. She also represented her country at the 1979 Pan American Games.

== International competitions ==
Year	Competition	Venue	Position	Event	Notes
Representing Brazil
1977	South American Youth Championships	Cochabamba, Bolivia	1st	200 m	24.95
1977	South American Youth Championships	Cochabamba, Bolivia	1st	400 m	55.55
1977	South American Youth Championships	Cochabamba, Bolivia	1st	4 × 100 m relay	47.66
1977	South American Youth Championships	Cochabamba, Bolivia	1st	4 × 400 m relay	3:50.6
1977	South American Championships	Montevideo, Uruguay	2nd	200 m	25.2
1977	South American Championships	Montevideo, Uruguay	3rd	4 × 100 m relay	47.8
1977	South American Championships	Montevideo, Uruguay	1st	4 × 400 m relay	3:49.7
1979	Pan American Games	San Juan, Puerto Rico	13th (h)	100 m	12.11^{1}
1979	Pan American Games	San Juan, Puerto Rico	10th (sf)	200 m	24.32
1979	Pan American Games	San Juan, Puerto Rico	4th	4 × 100 m relay	46.98
1979	Pan American Games	San Juan, Puerto Rico	4th	4 × 400 m relay	3:45.7
1979	South American Youth Championships	Cochabamba, Bolivia	1st	100 m	12.0
1979	South American Youth Championships	Cochabamba, Bolivia	1st	200 m	24.8
1979	South American Youth Championships	Cochabamba, Bolivia	3rd	4 × 100 m relay	52.5
1979	South American Youth Championships	Cochabamba, Bolivia	1st	4 × 400 m relay	4:00.0
1980	Pan American Junior Championships	Sudbury, Canada	7th	100 m	12.36
1980	Pan American Junior Championships	Sudbury, Canada	6th	200 m	24.52 (w)
1980	South American Junior Championships	Santiago, Chile	2nd	100 m	12.22
1980	South American Junior Championships	Santiago, Chile	1st	200 m	24.70
1980	South American Junior Championships	Santiago, Chile	3rd	4 × 100 m relay	47.64
1980	South American Junior Championships	Santiago, Chile	1st	4 × 400 m relay	3:43.4
1981	South American Junior Championships	Rio de Janeiro, Brazil	2nd	100 m	12.2
1981	South American Junior Championships	Rio de Janeiro, Brazil	1st	200 m	24.4
1981	South American Junior Championships	Rio de Janeiro, Brazil	1st	4 × 100 m relay	46.4
1981	South American Junior Championships	Rio de Janeiro, Brazil	1st	4 × 400 m relay	3:43.9
1981	South American Championships	La Paz, Bolivia	3rd	100 m	11.4
1981	South American Championships	La Paz, Bolivia	3rd	200 m	23.8
1981	South American Championships	La Paz, Bolivia	1st	4 × 100 m relay	45.3
1981	South American Championships	La Paz, Bolivia	1st	4 × 400 m relay	3:49.4

^{1}Did not start in the semifinal

== Personal bests ==
Outdoor

- 100 metres – 11.4h A (Laz Paz 1981)
- 200 metres – 23.8h A (Laz Paz 1981)
