= 1980 South American Junior Championships in Athletics =

XIII South American Junior Championships in Athletics
- Dates: October 23–26
- Host city: Santiago, Chile
- Level: Under-19
- Events: 36
- Participation: about 191 athletes from 8 nations

The 13th South American Junior Championships in Athletics were held in Santiago, Chile from October 23–26, 1980.

== Participation (unofficial) ==
Detailed result lists can be found on the "World Junior Athletics History" website. An unofficial count yields the number of about 191 athletes from about 8 countries: Argentina (49), Brazil (43), Chile (54), Colombia (9), Ecuador (13), Paraguay (9), Peru (11), Uruguay (3).

== Medal summary ==
Medal winners are published for men and women. Complete results can be found on the "World Junior Athletics History" website.

=== Men ===
Event	Gold		Silver		Bronze	
100 metres	Ernesto Braun (ARG)	10.86	Hugo Alzamora (ARG)	10.86	Gerson Santos (BRA)	11.06
200 metres	Hugo Alzamora (ARG)	21.84	Pedro Tarragó (BRA)	21.94	João da Silva (BRA)	21.96
400 metres	Joaquim Cruz (BRA)	47.17	Luís Borges (BRA)	48.64	Moisés del Castillo (PER)	48.68
800 metres	Joaquim Cruz (BRA)	1:50.5	Luís Borges (BRA)	1:52.5	Miguel Henríquez (CHI)	1:55.8
1500 metres	Jacinto Navarrete (COL)	3:55.4	Francisco Paulo (BRA)	3:56.4	Raúl Conde (ARG)	3:57.5
5000 metres	Jacinto Navarrete (COL)	14:40.3	Humberto Antonio (COL)	14:48.0	Carlos Alves (BRA)	15:06.3
110 metres hurdles	Sidney dos Santos (BRA)	15.06	George Biehl (CHI)	15.37	Javier Olivar (URU)	15.38
400 metres hurdles	Pablo Squella (CHI)	53.59	Jorge Díaz (ARG)	54.46	Javier Olivar (URU)	54.77
2000 metres steeplechase	Carlos Alves (BRA)	5:51.7	Reinaldo Silva (BRA)	5:55.2	Jorge Olmeda (CHI)	5:58.5
4 × 100 metres relay	Argentina; Hugo Alzamora; Aníbal Grande; Ernesto Braun; Gustavo Capart	41.17	Brazil; Sidney dos Santos; Pedro Souza; João da Silva; Gérson dos Santos	41.26	Chile; Rolando Casanueva; Fernando Salazar; Roberto Herrera; Gerardo San José	42.10
4 × 400 metres relay	Brazil; Marcos Vieira; Pedro Souza; Luiz Borges; Joaquim Cruz	3:13.1	Argentina; Jorge Díaz; Daniel Buffarini; Daniel Bambicha; Ernesto Braun	3:17.5	Chile; Gerardo San José; Fernando Salazar; Carlos Contreras; Pablo Squella	3:19.3
High jump	Milton Riitano Francisco (BRA)	2.10	Carlos Izquierdo (COL)	1.99	Cristián Bastías (CHI)	1.96
Pole vault	Jaime Silva (CHI)	4.60	Flavio Ferreira (BRA)	4.55	Francisco Cumplido (CHI)	4.40
Long jump	Márcio Macarini (BRA)	7.08	Sergio Izquierdo (ARG)	7.02	Jorge Mena (COL)	6.93
Triple jump	Roberto Ewert (CHI)	14.76	Valdir Sabino (BRA)	14.40	Francisco Costa (BRA)	14.28
Shot put	Mário Villa Real (BRA)	15.40	Norberto Aimé (ARG)	15.26	Carlos Hornos (URU)	14.84
Discus throw	Norberto Aimé (ARG)	45.14	Oziel da Silva (BRA)	40.52	João Caversan (BRA)	39.02
Hammer throw	Jorge Centurión (ARG)	57.78	Ralf Frustockl (BRA)	52.66	Marcos Leme (BRA)	51.84
Javelin throw	Wilson Pachalski (BRA)	60.00	Darío Jacob (ARG)	58.38	Joel dos Santos (BRA)	57.80
Decathlon	Ronaldo Alcaraz (BRA)	6563	Osvaldo Frigerio (ARG)	6473	Francisco Muñoz (CHI)	6355

=== Women ===
Event	Gold		Silver		Bronze	
100 metres	Adriana Pero (ARG)	12.19	Sueli Machado (BRA)	12.22	Isabel Kurth (CHI)	12.44
200 metres	Sueli Machado (BRA)	24.70	Adriana Pero (ARG)	25.04	Teresa Abalos (CHI)	25.06
400 metres	Elba Barbosa (BRA)	56.67	Marcela López Espinosa (ARG)	56.87	Silvia Augsburger (ARG)	56.95
800 metres	Silvia Augsburger (ARG)	2:11.5	Marcela López Espinosa (ARG)	2:11.8	Jacilene da Silva (BRA)	2:12.6
1500 metres	Carolina Ojeda (CHI)	4:44.1	Liliana Mariel Góngora (ARG)	4:45.1	Ana Lía Colazzo (ARG)	4:46.9
3000 metres	Liliana Mariel Góngora (ARG)	10:15.8	Ana Lía Colazzo (ARG)	10:20.6	Mariza da Silva (BRA)	10:24.1
100 metres hurdles	Beatriz Capotosto (ARG)	14.02	Yolanda van der Graaff (BRA)	14.82	Claudia Oxman (CHI)	14.87
200 metres hurdles	Beatriz Capotosto (ARG)	27.80	Mariana Pösz (ARG)	28.17	Yolanda van der Graaff (BRA)	28.85
4 × 100 metres relay	Chile; Patricia Pérez; Claudia Oxman; Teresa Ábalos; Isabel Kurth	47.10	Argentina; Adriana Pero; Susana Jenkins; Mariana Posz; Beatriz Capotosto	47.37	Brazil; Elba Barbosa; Maria Magnolia Figueiredo; Yolanda van der Graaff; Sueli Machado	47.64
4 × 400 metres relay	Brazil; Ana Leal; Jacilene da Silva; Elba Barbosa; Sueli Machado	3:43.4	Argentina; Adriana Pero; Anabella Dal'Lago; Marcela López; Silvia Augsburger	3:47.6	Chile; Claudia Iturra; Graciela Mardones; Carolina Ojeda; María Labarca	3:54.6
High jump	Liliana Arigoni (ARG)	1.76	Liliana Lohmann (BRA)	1.70	Claudia McAllister (ARG)	1.67
Long jump	Andrea Acevedo (CHI)	5.52	Maria de Jesus (BRA)	5.49	Márcia Malachias (BRA)	5.49
Shot put	María Isabel Urrutia (COL)	12.83	Alejandra Bevacqua (ARG)	12.74	Mara Misson (BRA)	12.09
Discus throw	Alejandra Bevacqua (ARG)	40.44	Josiany Gambi (BRA)	39.98	Ana Ruiz (ECU)	38.12
Javelin throw	Maria dos Santos (BRA)	44.88	Caroline Kittsteiner (CHI)	44.62	Maria Angélica Ono (BRA)	42.86
Pentathlon	Ana Urbano (ARG)	3599	Liliana Lohmann (BRA)	3648	Paola Raab (CHI)	3417

== Medal table (unofficial) ==
* Host nation (Chile)

Rank	Nation	Gold	Silver	Bronze	Total
1	Brazil (BRA)	14	16	14	44
2	Argentina (ARG)	13	16	4	33
3	Chile (CHI)*	6	2	12	20
4	Colombia (COL)	3	2	1	6
5	Uruguay (URU)	0	0	3	3
6	Ecuador (ECU)	0	0	1	1
6	Peru (PER)	0	0	1	1
Totals (7 entries)		36	36	36	108
