= 1978 South American Youth Championships in Athletics =

V South American Youth Championships in Athletics
- Dates: November 11–13
- Host city: Montevideo, Uruguay
- Level: Youth
- Events: 33
- Participation: about 179 athletes from 7 nations

The 5th South American Youth Championships in Athletics were held in Montevideo, Uruguay from November 11–13, 1978.

== Medal summary ==
Medal winners are published for boys and girls. Complete results can be found on the "World Junior Athletics History" website.

=== Men ===
Event	Gold		Silver		Bronze	
100 metres (wind: +1.0 m/s)	Hugo Alzamora (ARG)	10.89	Enrique Tapia (CHI)	10.93	Roberto Herrera (CHI)	11.27
200 metres (wind: +1.5 m/s)	Hugo Alzamora (ARG)	22.30	Enrique Tapia (CHI)	22.41	Norberto Cedeño (VEN)	22.84
400 metres	Joaquim Cruz (BRA)	50.15	Sergio Cárdenas (CHI)	51.69	Moisés del Castillo (PER)	51.82
800 metres	Joaquim Cruz (BRA)	1:56.1	Reinaldo Filho (BRA)	1:57.2	Sergio Cárdenas (CHI)	1:57.8
1500 metres	Marcelo Bancalari (CHI)	4:04.5	Carlos Alves (BRA)	4:06.2	Reinaldo Filho (BRA)	4:07.8
3000 metres	Mario Varela (CHI)	8:53.6	Ángel Román (VEN)	8:55.3	José dos Santos (BRA)	8:56.3
1500 metres steeplechase	Carlos Alves (BRA)	4:24.9	Reinaldo Filho (BRA)	4:28.8	Johnny Moreno (VEN)	4:37.9
110 metres hurdles (wind: +1.5 m/s)	Sidney dos Santos (BRA)	14.3	Ricardo de Oliveira (BRA)	14.9	Daniel Dubie (ARG)	14.9
300 metres hurdles	Ricardo de Oliveira (BRA)	38.94	Sidney dos Santos (BRA)	39.13	Daniel Dubie (ARG)	40.22
High jump	Federico Cavalcante (BRA)	1.95	Cristián Bastías (CHI)	1.85	Daniel Wolfberg (CHI)	1.85
Pole vault	Adolfo Trucco (ARG)	3.65	Francisco Cumplido (CHI)	3.50	Jaime Silva (CHI)	3.50
Long jump	Márcio Macarini (BRA)	6.74	Marcelo Cárcamo (CHI)	6.67	Rubén Riguetti (URU)	6.49
Triple jump	Valdir Sabino (BRA)	14.01	Newton Klauss (BRA)	13.75	Juan Marcovich (PER)	13.66
Shot put	Mario Hornos (URU)	16.08	José Caldera (VEN)	15.59	Mario Junior (BRA)	15.50
Discus throw	Luis Piasco (ARG)	43.44	Raúl Peralta (PAR)	41.92	Omar Civalero (ARG)	41.56
Hammer throw	Wilson Batista (BRA)	48.76	Jorge Centurión (ARG)	44.70	Raúl Charadía (ARG)	39.62
Javelin throw	Joel dos Santos (BRA)	51.92	Jorge Standen (CHI)	51.04	Ronaldo Alcaraz (BRA)	50.14
Hexathlon	Norberto Aimé (ARG)	4048	Ronaldo Alcaraz (BRA)	4023	Adolfo Marín (PAR)	3834
4 × 100 metres relay	Argentina; Alberto Alzamora; Ernesto Braun; Jorge Araya; Hugo Alzamora	43.27	Chile; Gerardo San José; Guillermo Puebla; Roberto Herrera; Enrique Tapía	43.61	Brazil; Roberto Lima; Ricardo de Oliveira; Erivaldino Souza; Pedro Souza	44.17
4 × 400 metres relay	Brazil; Ricardo de Oliveira; Sidney dos Santos; Pedro Souza; Joaquim Cruz	3:25.0	Chile; Gerardo San José; Marcelo Bancalari; Sergio Cárdenas; Guillermo Puebla	3:27.4	Venezuela; Douglas Murillo; Oswaldo Zea; Chaparro; Ramírez	3:30.1

=== Women ===
Event	Gold		Silver		Bronze	
100 metres (wind: +0.7 m/s)	Adriana Pero (ARG)	12.28	Beatriz Capotosto (ARG)	12.33	Fabiana Arizaga (URU)	12.70
200 metres (wind: +0.7 m/s)	Adriana Pero (ARG)	25.43	María Elena Labarca (CHI)	25.60	Fabiana Arizaga (URU)	26.12
400 metres	Marcela López Espinosa (ARG)	57.38	María Elena Labarca (CHI)	57.87	Alejandra Vives (ARG)	59.28
800 metres	Marcela López Espinosa (ARG)	2:13.7	Cláudia Adolfo (BRA)	2:14.7	Silvia Augsburger (ARG)	2:15.4
80 metres hurdles (wind: +1.5 m/s)	Beatriz Capotosto (ARG)	11.75	Célia Pereira (BRA)	12.65	Maria Lopes (BRA)	12.81
High jump	Ana Urbano (ARG)	1.55	Ivonette Nascimento (BRA)	1.55	Carmen Garib (CHI)	1.50
Long jump	Adriana Duarte (BRA)	5.53	Beatriz Capotosto (ARG)	5.52	Graciela Acosta (URU)	5.38
Shot put	Alejandra Bevacqua (ARG)	12.14	María Calvetti (URU)	10.72	Patricia Pacheco (ARG)	10.40
Discus throw	Solange Reimundo (BRA)	33.96	Alejandra Bevacqua (ARG)	32.76	Vera da Silva (BRA)	31.70
Javelin throw	Carolina Kittsteiner (CHI)	39.68	Eugenia Urra (CHI)	39.28	Regina de Oliveira (BRA)	39.06
Pentathlon	Célia Pereira (BRA)	3223	Ana Urbano (ARG)	3183	Sonia Riffo (CHI)	3163
4 × 100 metres relay	Argentina; Adriana Pero; Beatriz Capotosto; Susana Crespo; Patricia Pedrazzi	48.27	Chile; Carolina Cox; Claudia Hoelzel; Isabel Kurth; María Labarca	49.57	Brazil; Suzete Montalvão; Cláudia Neves; Maria Lopes; Maria Figueirêdo	49.88
4 × 400 metres relay	Argentina; Adriana Pero; Silvia Augsburger; Marcela López; Alejandra Vives	3:56.3	Chile; Carolina Ojeda; Sara Cortés; Alexandra Pavletich; María Labarca	3:58.1	Brazil; Célia Pereira; Suzete Montalvão; Maria Figueirêdo; Cláudia Adolfo	4:10.0

== Medal table (unofficial) ==
* Host nation (Uruguay)

Rank	Nation	Gold	Silver	Bronze	Total
1	Argentina (ARG)	15	5	7	27
2	Brazil (BRA)	14	10	10	34
3	Chile (CHI)	3	14	6	23
4	Uruguay (URU)*	1	1	4	6
5	Venezuela (VEN)	0	2	3	5
6	Paraguay (PAR)	0	1	1	2
7	Peru (PER)	0	0	2	2
Totals (7 entries)		33	33	33	99

== Participation (unofficial) ==
Detailed result lists can be found on the "World Junior Athletics History" website. An unofficial count yields the number of about 179 athletes from about 7 countries:

- Argentina (39)
- Brazil (38)
- Chile (38)
- Paraguay (14)
- (Peru) Perú (15)
- Uruguay (22)
- Venezuela (13)
