= Beatriz Capotosto =

Argentine hurdler (1962–2018)

Personal information
- Born: 16 May 1962 Buenos Aires, Argentina
- Died: 20 December 2018 (aged 56) Buenos Aires, Argentina
- Height: 1.70 m (5 ft 7 in)
- Weight: 62 kg (137 lb)

Sport
- Sport: Athletics
- Events: 100 m hurdles, 60 m hurdles
- Club: Capital Federal

Delía Beatriz Capotosto (16 May 1962 – 20 December 2018) was an Argentine athlete who specialised in the sprint hurdles. She represented her country at the 1983 World Championships and 1984 Summer Olympics. In addition, she won multiple medals at the regional level. She was born and died in Buenos Aires.

== International competitions ==
Year	Competition	Venue	Position	Event	Notes
Representing Argentina
1977	South American Youth Championships	Rio de Janeiro, Brazil	2nd	100 m	12.29
1977	South American Youth Championships	Rio de Janeiro, Brazil	5th	200 m	25.48
1977	South American Youth Championships	Rio de Janeiro, Brazil	3rd	4 × 100 m relay	49.06
1977	South American Championships	Montevideo, Uruguay	2nd	100 m	12.20
1977	South American Championships	Montevideo, Uruguay	6th	200 m	25.6
1977	South American Championships	Montevideo, Uruguay	1st	4 × 100 m relay	46.7
1978	South American Youth Championships	Montevideo, Uruguay	2nd	100 m	12.33
1978	South American Youth Championships	Montevideo, Uruguay	1st	80 m hurdles	11.75
1978	South American Youth Championships	Montevideo, Uruguay	2nd	Long jump	5.52 m
1978	South American Youth Championships	Montevideo, Uruguay	1st	4 × 100 m relay	48.27
1978	South American Junior Championships	São Paulo, Brazil	1st	100 m	12.4
1978	South American Junior Championships	São Paulo, Brazil	1st	100 m hurdles	14.6
1978	South American Junior Championships	São Paulo, Brazil	3rd	4 × 100 m relay	48.2
1978	South American Junior Championships	São Paulo, Brazil	1st	Long jump	5.67 m
1979	Pan American Games	San Juan, Puerto Rico	17th (h)	100 m	12.42
1979	Pan American Games	San Juan, Puerto Rico	6th	100 m hurdles	14.18 (w)
1979	South American Championships	Bucaramanga, Colombia	3rd	100 m hurdles	14.7
1980	Pan American Junior Championships	Sudbury, Canada	4th	100 m hurdles	15.03
1980	South American Junior Championships	Santiago, Chile	1st	100 m hurdles	14.02
1980	South American Junior Championships	Santiago, Chile	1st	200 m hurdles	27.80
1981	South American Junior Championships	Rio de Janeiro, Brazil	1st	100 m hurdles	14.4
1981	South American Junior Championships	Rio de Janeiro, Brazil	1st	200 m hurdles	27.9 (w)
1981	South American Championships	La Paz, Bolivia	3rd	100 m hurdles	13.9
1981	South American Championships	La Paz, Bolivia	3rd	4 × 100 m relay	46.9
1981	South American Championships	La Paz, Bolivia	2nd	4 × 400 m relay	3:51.0
1982	Southern Cross Games	Santa Fe, Argentina	1st	100 m hurdles	13.75
1982	Southern Cross Games	Santa Fe, Argentina	1st	4 × 100 m relay	47.1
1983	World Championships	Helsinki, Finland	23rd (qf)	100 m hurdles	13.60
1983	Pan American Games	Caracas, Venezuela	7th	100 m hurdles	13.74
1983	Ibero-American Championships	Barcelona, Spain	2nd	100 m hurdles	13.52
1983	South American Championships	Santa Fe, Argentina	1st	100 m hurdles	13.2
1983	South American Championships	Santa Fe, Argentina	3rd	4 × 100 m relay	46.9
1984	Olympic Games	Los Angeles, United States	18th (sf)	100 m hurdles	13.90
1985	World Indoor Games	Paris, France	9th (sf)	60 m hurdles	8.47
1985	South American Championships	Santiago, Chile	1st	100 m hurdles	13.87
1985	South American Championships	Santiago, Chile	3rd	4 × 100 m relay	46.80
1986	Ibero-American Championships	Havana, Cuba	–	100 m hurdles	DNF
1987	Pan American Games	Indianapolis, United States	8th (h)	100 m hurdles	14.08
1988	Ibero-American Championships	Mexico City, Mexico	3rd	100 m hurdles	13.54
1988	Ibero-American Championships	Mexico City, Mexico	6th	4 × 400 m relay	3:42.17

== Personal bests ==
Outdoor

- 100 metres hurdles – 13.45 (Santiago, Chile 1984)
- 400 metres hurdles – 59.86 (Buenos Aires 1984)

Indoor

- 60 metres hurdles – 8.47 (Paris 1985)
