= 1981 South American Junior Championships in Athletics =

XIV South American Junior Championships in Athletics
- Dates: October 15–18
- Host city: Rio de Janeiro, Brazil
- Level: Under-20
- Events: 36
- Participation: about 189 athletes from 9 nations

The 14th South American Junior Championships in Athletics were held in Rio de Janeiro, Brazil from October 15–18, 1981.

== Participation (unofficial) ==
Detailed result lists can be found on the "World Junior Athletics History" website. An unofficial count yields the number of about 189 athletes from about 9 countries: Argentina (42), Brazil (50), Chile (37), Colombia (12), Ecuador (1), Paraguay (6), Peru (2), Uruguay (10), Venezuela (29).

== Medal summary ==
Medal winners are published for men and women Complete results can be found on the "World Junior Athletics History" website.

=== Men ===
Event	Gold		Silver		Bronze	
100 metres	João da Silva (BRA)	10.5	Hugo Alzamora (ARG)	10.6	Enrique Tapia (CHI)	10.7
200 metres	João da Silva (BRA)	20.7	Antonio Gómez (VEN)	21.6	Hugo Alzamora (ARG)	21.6
400 metres	Pablo Squella (CHI)	47.9	Oswaldo Zea (VEN)	48.1	Luis Romero Lizardi (VEN)	48.9
800 metres	Luís Borges (BRA)	1:51.2	Luis Romero Lizardi (VEN)	1:51.4	Pablo Squella (CHI)	1:51.6
1500 metres	José Castillo (VEN)	3:54.2	Ángel Figueiredo (VEN)	3:54.2	Jorge Díaz (CHI)	3:55.1
5000 metres	Jacinto Navarrete (COL)	14:22.2	Julio César Gómez (ARG)	14:33.3	Luis Nempo (CHI)	14:34.6
110 metres hurdles	Elvis Cedeño (VEN)	14.5	Pedro Chiamulera (BRA)	14.7	Javier Olivar (URU)	15.2
400 metres hurdles	Pablo Squella (CHI)	52.4	Jorge Díaz (ARG)	52.8	Javier Olivar (URU)	52.9
2000 metres steeplechase	Carlos Alves (BRA)	5:40.0	José Laturely (VEN)	5:43.8	Ricardo Vera (URU)	5:44.2
4 × 100 metres relay	Chile; Ruedi; Mauricio Urquiza; Roberto Herrera; Enrique Tapia	41.6	Brazil; Martins; Freitas; Roberto Lima; João da Silva	42.0	Argentina; Ernesto Braun; Oscar Barrionuevo; Alberto Alzamora; Hugo Alzamora	42.0
4 × 400 metres relay	Brazil; Marcos Vieira; Geraldo de Assis; Carlos de Souza; Luiz Borges	3:12.7	Venezuela; Aaron Phillips; Luis Lizardi; González; Oswaldo Zea	3:14.6	Chile; Carlos Contreras; Ramon Torrealba; Alejandro Krauss; Pablo Squella	3:16.1
High jump	Milton Riitano Francisco (BRA)	2.12	Fernando Pastoriza (ARG)	2.09	Luciano Bacelli (BRA)	2.06
Pole vault	Adolfo Trucco (ARG)	4.20	Daniel Prieto (CHI)	4.10	Flavio Ferreira (BRA)	4.00
Long jump	Robson da Silva (BRA)	7.40	Geraldo Magela (BRA)	7.08	Gerardo Aluvino (VEN)	7.05
Triple jump	Roberto Audain (VEN)	15.35	Isaías Xavier (BRA)	14.83	Jorge Mena (COL)	14.66
Shot put	Adilson Oliveira (BRA)	15.81	Norberto Aimé (ARG)	15.78	Sergio Eleusippi (ARG)	14.98
Discus throw	Oziel da Silva (BRA)	47.74	Norberto Aimé (ARG)	45.54	Altamiro Severino (BRA)	43.80
Hammer throw	Jorge Centurión (ARG)	59.66	Marcos Leme (BRA)	57.36	Ralf Frustockl (BRA)	52.62
Javelin throw	Wilson Pachalski (BRA)	63.72	Jorge Parraguirre (CHI)	62.60	Fernando Espindola (ARG)	62.12
Decathlon	Ronaldo Alcaraz (BRA)	7115	Osvaldo Frigerio (ARG)	6971	José Aguirre (VEN)	6356

=== Women ===
Event	Gold		Silver		Bronze	
100 metres	Patricia Pérez (CHI)	12.2	Sueli Machado (BRA)	12.2	Nara das Neves (BRA)	12.3
200 metres	Sueli Machado (BRA)	24.4	Maria Magnólia Figueiredo (BRA)	24.8	Claudia Iturra (CHI)	24.8
400 metres	Elba Barbosa (BRA)	55.2	Florencia Chilberry (VEN)	55.7	Ángela Mancilla (COL)	56.2
800 metres	Silvia Augsburger (ARG)	2:10.9	Graciela Mardones (CHI)	2:11.7	Ana Maria Leal (BRA)	2:13.4
1500 metres	Liliana Mariel Góngora (ARG)	4:35.7	Stella Maris Selles (ARG)	4:39.3	Marcela Arraigada (CHI)	4:40.0
3000 metres	Liliana Mariel Góngora (ARG)	9:58.3	Stella Maris Selles (ARG)	10:01.5	Hilda Ulloa (CHI)	10:06.8
100 metres hurdles	Beatriz Capotosto (ARG)	14.4	Angie Marie Regis (VEN)	14.4	Susana Jenkins (ARG)	14.7
200 metres hurdles	Beatriz Capotosto (ARG)	27.9w	Yolanda van der Graaff (BRA)	28.5w	Angie Marie Regis (VEN)	28.6w
4 × 100 metres relay	Brazil; Maria Magnólia Figueiredo; Nara das Neves; Yolanda van der Graaff; Sueli Machado	46.4	Argentina; Susana Jenkins; Gabriela García; Claudia Galichini; Beatriz Capotosto	47.1	Chile; Patricia Pérez; Claudia Iturra; Graciela Mardones; Patricia Silva	47.3
4 × 400 metres relay	Brazil; Ana Leal; Maria Nogueira; Elba Barbosa; Sueli Machado	3:43.9	Argentina; Marcela Ruiz; Marcela López; Silvia Augsburger; Claudia Galichini	3:47.3	Chile; Marcela Arriagada; Carolina Ojeda; Claudia Iturra; Graciela Mardones	3:50.0
High jump	Liliana Lohmann (BRA)	1.73	Tânia de Paula (BRA)	1.70	Liliana Arigoni (ARG)	1.65
Long jump	Graciela Corradini (ARG)	5.86	Andrea Acevedo (CHI)	5.81	Graciela Acosta (URU)	5.74
Shot put	Alejandra Bevacqua (ARG)	13.32	María Isabel Urrutia (COL)	12.78	Luz Bohórquez (VEN)	12.77
Discus throw	María Isabel Urrutia (COL)	44.24	Alejandra Bevacqua (ARG)	41.82	Yunaira Piña (VEN)	41.78
Javelin throw	Marieta Riera (VEN)	46.36	Carolina Weil (CHI)	45.04	Maria dos Santos (BRA)	44.18
Heptathlon	Cláudia Jarenczuk (BRA)	4944	Paola Raab (CHI)	4940	Ana Urbano (ARG)	4879

== Medal table (unofficial) ==
* Host nation (Brazil)

Rank	Nation	Gold	Silver	Bronze	Total
1	Brazil (BRA)*	17	9	7	33
2	Argentina (ARG)	9	12	7	28
3	Venezuela (VEN)	4	8	6	18
4	Chile (CHI)	4	6	10	20
5	Colombia (COL)	2	1	2	5
6	Uruguay (URU)	0	0	4	4
Totals (6 entries)		36	36	36	108
