= 1990 World Junior Championships in Athletics – Men's 110 metres hurdles =

The men's 110 metres hurdles event at the 1990 World Junior Championships in Athletics was held in Plovdiv, Bulgaria, at Deveti Septemvri Stadium on 10 and 11 August. 106.7 cm (3'6) (senior implement) hurdles were used.

== Medalists ==
Gold	Antti Haapakoski; Finland
Silver	Alexis Sánchez; Cuba
Bronze	Kyle Vander-Kuyp; Australia

== Results ==
=== Final ===
11 August
Wind: -0.2 m/s

Rank	Name	Nationality	Time	Notes
1st place, gold medalist(s)	Antti Haapakoski	Finland	13.74	
2nd place, silver medalist(s)	Alexis Sánchez	Cuba	13.75	
3rd place, bronze medalist(s)	Kyle Vander-Kuyp	Australia	13.85	
4	Phillip Riley	United States	13.94	
5	Eliecer Pulgar	Venezuela	14.02	
6	Mike Fenner	East Germany	14.18	
7	José Pérez	Cuba	14.19	
8	Gaute Gundersen	Norway	14.21	

=== Semifinals ===
11 August

==== Semifinal 1 ====
Wind: +1.0 m/s

Rank	Name	Nationality	Time	Notes
1	Alexis Sánchez	Cuba	13.85	Q
2	Mike Fenner	East Germany	13.88	Q
3	Eliecer Pulgar	Venezuela	14.00	Q
4	Gaute Gundersen	Norway	14.11	Q
5	Glenn Terry	United States	14.14	
6	Dmitriy Kolesnichenko	Soviet Union	14.28	
7	Thierry Herbe	France	14.41	
8	Tim Kroeker	Canada	14.42	

==== Semifinal 2 ====
Wind: +3.1 m/s

Rank	Name	Nationality	Time	Notes
1	Antti Haapakoski	Finland	13.67 w	Q
2	Kyle Vander-Kuyp	Australia	13.93 w	Q
3	Phillip Riley	United States	13.98 w	Q
4	José Pérez	Cuba	14.08 w	Q
5	Artur Kohutek	Poland	14.36 w	
6	Armin Toomra	Soviet Union	14.48 w	
7	Richard Harbour	United Kingdom	14.51 w	
8	Claude Edorh	West Germany	14.60 w	

=== Heats ===
10 August

==== Heat 1 ====
Wind: +0.7 m/s

Rank	Name	Nationality	Time	Notes
1	José Pérez	Cuba	14.02	Q
2	Artur Kohutek	Poland	14.16	Q
3	Kyle Vander-Kuyp	Australia	14.19	Q
4	Richard Harbour	United Kingdom	14.37	q
5	Armin Toomra	Soviet Union	14.39	q
6	Herwigh Kranz	East Germany	14.69	

==== Heat 2 ====
Wind: +0.3 m/s

Rank	Name	Nationality	Time	Notes
1	Glenn Terry	United States	14.18	Q
2	Eliecer Pulgar	Venezuela	14.23	Q
3	Tim Kroeker	Canada	14.46	Q
4	Thierry Herbe	France	14.47	q
5	Peter Frei	Switzerland	14.51	
6	Tsai Ming-Yuan	Chinese Taipei	15.14	

==== Heat 3 ====
Wind: +0.6 m/s

Rank	Name	Nationality	Time	Notes
1	Antti Haapakoski	Finland	14.03	Q
2	Mike Fenner	East Germany	14.16	Q
3	Claude Edorh	West Germany	14.40	Q
4	Emmanuel Pilutti	France	14.50	
5	Keiichiro Seki	Japan	14.68	
6	Johan Lisabeth	Belgium	14.69	
7	Marco Mina	Peru	14.74	

==== Heat 4 ====
Wind: +0.3 m/s

Rank	Name	Nationality	Time	Notes
1	Alexis Sánchez	Cuba	13.89	Q
2	Phillip Riley	United States	14.09	Q
3	Gaute Gundersen	Norway	14.18	Q
4	Dmitriy Kolesnichenko	Soviet Union	14.34	q
5	Krzysztof Skwarek	Poland	14.62	
6	Jean-Paul Bruwier	Belgium	14.77	
7	Christoph Pöstinger	Austria	14.80	
8	Ivo Seyzov	Bulgaria	15.24	

== Participation ==
According to an unofficial count, 27 athletes from 20 countries participated in the event.

- Australia (1)
- Austria (1)
- Belgium (2)
- Bulgaria (1)
- Canada (1)
- Chinese Taipei (1)
- Cuba (2)
- East Germany (2)
- Finland (1)
- France (2)
- Japan (1)
- Norway (1)
- Peru (1)
- Poland (2)
- Soviet Union (2)
- Switzerland (1)
- United Kingdom (1)
- United States (2)
- Venezuela (1)
- West Germany (1)
