= Athletics at the 1991 Pan American Games – Men's 110 metres hurdles =

Men's 110 metres hurdles at the Pan American Games

The men's 110 metres hurdles event at the 1991 Pan American Games was held in Havana, Cuba with the final on 7 August.

== Medalists ==
Gold	Silver	Bronze
Cletus Clark; United States	Alexis Sánchez; Cuba	Elbert Ellis; United States

== Results ==
=== Heats ===
Wind:
Heat 1: +2.4 m/s, Heat 2: +0.9 m/s

Rank	Heat	Name	Nationality	Time	Notes
1	1	Cletus Clark	United States	13.81	Q
2	2	Emilio Valle	Cuba	13.82	Q
3	1	Alexis Sánchez	Cuba	13.87	Q
4	2	Elbert Ellis	United States	13.91	Q
5	2	Tim Kroeker	Canada	13.95	Q
6	1	Richard Bucknor	Jamaica	13.98	Q
7	1	Joilto Bonfim	Brazil	14.03	q
8	1	Elvis Cedeño	Venezuela	14.21	q
9	2	Sidney Clark	Panama	14.83	
10	2	Mauricio Carranza	El Salvador	15.69	
	2	Greg Williams	Jamaica	DNF	

=== Final ===
Wind: +0.8 m/s

Rank	Lane	Name	Nationality	Time	Notes
1st place, gold medalist(s)	4	Cletus Clark	United States	13.71	
2nd place, silver medalist(s)	3	Alexis Sánchez	Cuba	13.76	
3rd place, bronze medalist(s)	6	Elbert Ellis	United States	13.89	
4	5	Emilio Valle	Cuba	13.94	
5	7	Richard Bucknor	Jamaica	13.98	
6	1	Tim Kroeker	Canada	14.00	
7	8	Joilto Bonfim	Brazil	14.06	
8	2	Elvis Cedeño	Venezuela	14.11	
