= Alexis Sánchez (hurdler) =

Hurdler (born 1971)

Personal information
- Born: 13 April 1971 (age 55)

Sport
- Sport: Track and field
Medal record
Representing Cuba
Pan American Games
Silver medal – second place	1991 Havana	110m hurdles
Central American and Caribbean Games
Silver medal – second place	1990 Mexico City	110m hurdles
Bronze medal – third place	1993 Ponce	110m hurdles
World Junior Championships
Silver medal – second place	1990 Plovdiv	110m hurdles

Alexis Sánchez González (born 13 April 1971) is a retired athlete who specialised in the 110 metres hurdles and 400 metres hurdles. Before Spain he represented his native Cuba, competing at the 1991 World Championships where he reached the semifinals. He was also the 110 metres hurdles World Junior Championships silver medalist in 1990.

Later in his life he started working as a hurdling coach of, among others, Felipe Vivancos.

== Competition record ==
Year	Competition	Venue	Position	Event	Notes
Representing Cuba
1988	Central American and Caribbean Junior Championships (U20)	Nassau, Bahamas	2nd	110 m hurdles	14.62
1988	Central American and Caribbean Junior Championships (U20)	Nassau, Bahamas	3rd	4 × 100 m relay	41.99
1989	Pan American Junior Championships	Santa Fe, Argentina	2nd	110 m hurdles	14.39
1989	Pan American Junior Championships	Santa Fe, Argentina	3rd	4 × 400 m relay	3:14.06
1990	Central American and Caribbean Junior Championships (U20)	Havana, Cuba	1st	110 m hurdles	14.03
1990	World Junior Championships	Plovdiv, Bulgaria	2nd	110 m hurdles	13.75 (wind: -0.2 m/s)
1990	Central American and Caribbean Games	Mexico City, Mexico	2nd	110 m hurdles	13.94 (A)
1991	Pan American Games	Havana, Cuba	2nd	110 m hurdles	13.76
1991	World Championships	Tokyo, Japan	11th (sf)	110 m hurdles	13.81
1992	Ibero-American Championships	Seville, Spain	2nd	110 m hurdles	13.66 (wind: -0.6 m/s)
1993	Central American and Caribbean Games	Ponce, Puerto Rico	3rd	110 m hurdles	14.14
1996	Ibero-American Championships	Medellín, Colombia	3rd	110 m hurdles	13.89
1996	Ibero-American Championships	Medellín, Colombia	1st	400 m hurdles	49.22
Representing Spain
2004	Ibero-American Championships	Huelva, Spain	6th	110 m hurdles	13.90

== Personal bests ==
Outdoor

- 110 metres hurdles – 13.63 (Havana 1992)
- 400 metres hurdles – 49.22 (Medellín 1996)

Indoor

- 60 metres hurdles – 7.90 (Madrid 2000)
