= Joaquim Cruz =

Brazilian middle-distance runner

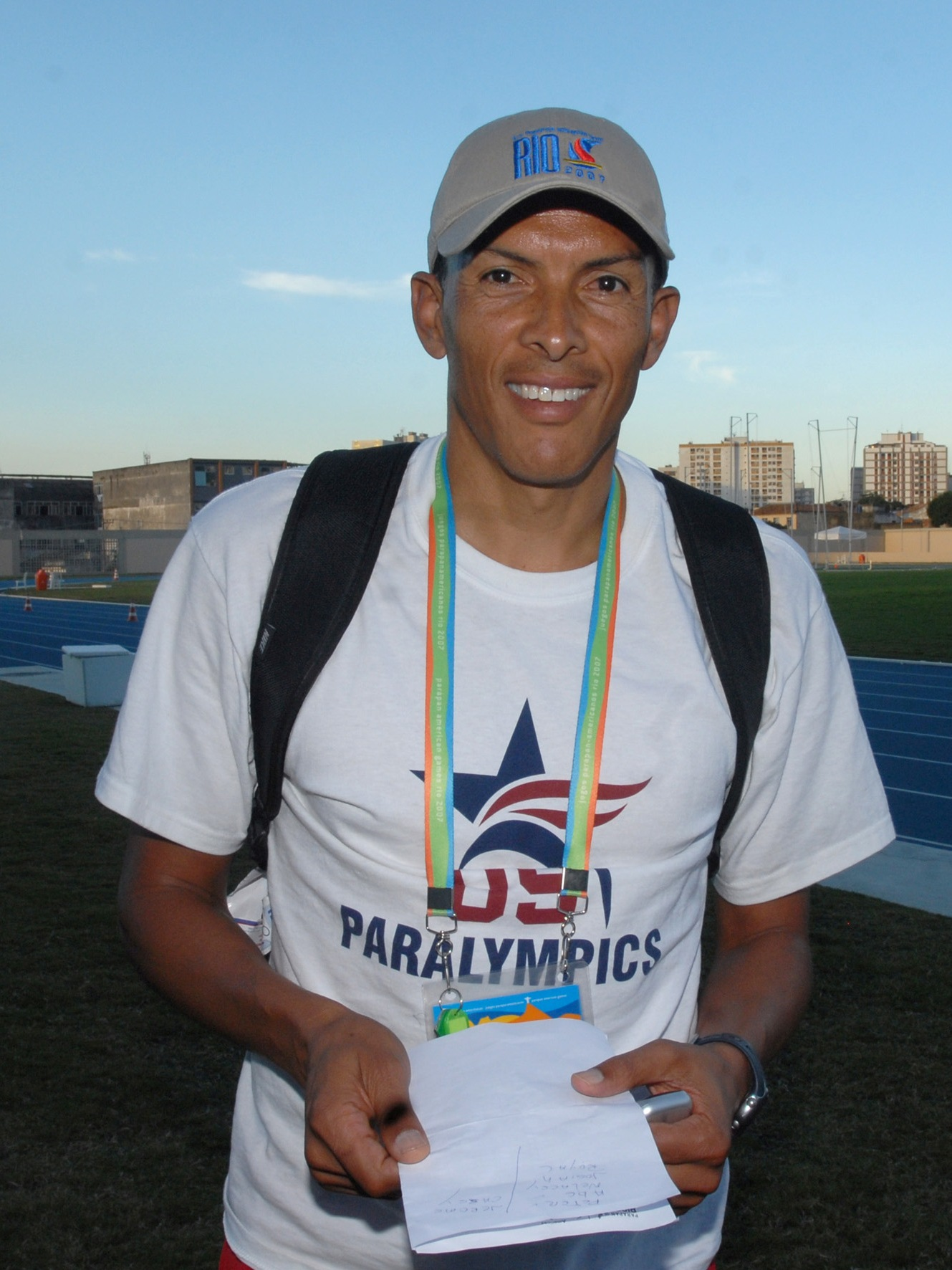
- Cruz during the 2007 Parapan American Games

Personal information
- Full name: Joaquim Carvalho Cruz
- Born: 12 March 1963 (age 63) Taguatinga, Federal District, Brazil
- Height: 1.87 m (6 ft 2 in)
- Weight: 74 kg (163 lb)

Sport
- Sport: Athletics
- Events: 800 m, 1500 m
- Club: Reebok/Team Nike/Funilense

Achievements and titles
- Personal bests: 800 m – 1:41.77 (1984); 1500 m – 3:34.63 (1988)
Medal record
Representing Brazil
Olympic Games
Gold medal – first place	1984 Los Angeles	800 m
Silver medal – second place	1988 Seoul	800 m
World Championships
Bronze medal – third place	1983 Helsinki	800 m
Pan American Games
Gold medal – first place	1987 Indianapolis	1500 m
Gold medal – first place	1995 Mar del Plata	1500 m

Joaquim Carvalho Cruz (born 12 March 1963) is a Brazilian former middle-distance runner, winner of the 800 meters at the 1984 Summer Olympics. He is one of only ten men, and in August 1984 became the second man, to run the 800 metres in less than 1 minute 42 seconds.

== Biography ==
Joaquim Cruz was born in Taguatinga, Federal District. The son of a steel worker, he began running as a 13-year-old, and showed great promise as a junior. At the age of 15 his personal best over 800 m stood at 1:51 min. After setting a junior world record of 1:44.3 min in 1981, he received a scholarship for the University of Oregon in 1983. The move immediately paid off, and Cruz won the National Collegiate Athletic Association (NCAA) championships over 800 m that same year. He also competed in the inaugural World Championships in 1983, winning the bronze.

The following year at the 1984 NCAA Track and Field Championships, Cruz became one of only a handful of people to win the 800/1500 m double (a feat that would not be repeated until Andrew Wheating achieved it in 2010). Cruz is the co-holder of University of Oregon 1,500 m school record of 3:36.48 along with A.J. Acosta. Later that summer, he ran a time of 2:14.09 min over 1000 m in Nice which is still the current South American record over that distance.

The 1984 Summer Olympic Games were held in Los Angeles, and Cruz was considered to be one of the 800 m favorites, along with world record holder Sebastian Coe of Great Britain. In the last turn of the 800 meter final, Cruz started a sprint from second place and took the lead, never losing it. He crossed the line in 1:43.00, breaking Alberto Juantorena's Olympic Record and making him the first Brazilian Olympic athletics gold medalist since triple jumper Adhemar Ferreira da Silva won both in 1952 and 1956.

Later that week, after winning his first round heat of the Olympic 1500 m, Cruz did not start in the semi-finals due to a cold. After recovering from the cold, Cruz had a five-day stretch of racing a few weeks after the Olympic Games in which he set several extremely fast times. First, he ran a new Brazilian 800 m record of 1:42.34 at the Weltklasse meet in Zurich, becoming only the second runner in history to break 1:43. Two days later he ran a 1:42.41 at the Memorial Van Damme meet in Brussels, and then two days after that, at a meeting in Cologne, Cruz ran the second fastest 800 meters in history at the time, his time of 1:41.77 being only four hundredths of a second outside Coe's world record from June 1981. He is the tenth fastest athlete in the history of the event. By the end of the year, he was the NCAA champion, the Olympic champion, undefeated in all seven of his 800-meter finals, had run the 2nd, 4th, 5th, and 6th fastest 800 meter times in history, and easily ranked as #1 in the world for 800 meters in 1984 by Track & Field News magazine.

In 1985 Cruz won six of his eight 800 meter races, the last three of which were won under 1:43: 1:42.98 at ISTAF, 1:42.53 in Cologne (beating Sebastian Coe), and 1:42.49 in Koblenz. His record was good enough to earn him a World #1 ranking by Track & Field News magazine for the second year in a row. He also ran the world's 3rd fastest 1,000 meter time for 1985, a 2:15.11. In the following two years he struggled with injuries and raced little, though he did manage to win the gold medal in the 1,500 meters at the 1987 Pan American Games, defeating both Jim Spivey (who within the next month would win a bronze medal at the World Championships) and American mile record holder Steve Scott.

During the 1988 Summer Olympics, Cruz appeared to be on his way to retaining his Olympic 800 m title when he was passed by Kenyan runner Paul Ereng, leaving Cruz with the silver medal. Troubled by Achilles' tendon injuries, Cruz was never again able to reach the international top level. In 1993, he tried to make a comeback and started over 1500 m at various Grand Prix races in Europe but failed to make a major impact. His last victory of significance came in the 1500 meters at the 1995 Pan American Games. One year later, taking part at his third Olympics at the 1996 Summer Olympics, Cruz was the Brazilian flag-bearer and ran the 1500 meters without reaching the finals.

Cruz competed at the 2001 Masters West Region Track and Field Championship winning the 5000 meter run at age 38.

Cruz was the last torchbearer and lit the flame cauldron at the 2007 Pan American Games in Rio de Janeiro, on 13 July 2007. After retiring from competitions he became a running coach at the Olympic Training Center in Chula Vista, California. He guides David Brown and Shaquille Vance, among other Paralympic athletics.

== International competitions ==
Year	Competition	Venue	Position	Event	Notes
Representing Brazil
1978	South American Youth Championships	Montevideo, Uruguay	1st	400 m	50.15
1978	South American Youth Championships	Montevideo, Uruguay	1st	800 m	1:56.1
1978	South American Youth Championships	Montevideo, Uruguay	1st	4 × 400 m relay	3:25.0
1978	South American Junior Championships	São Paulo, Brazil	3rd	800 m	1:51.0
1979	South American Youth Championships	Cochabamba, Bolivia	1st	400 m	48.3
1979	South American Youth Championships	Cochabamba, Bolivia	1st	800 m	1:58.6
1979	South American Youth Championships	Cochabamba, Bolivia	1st	1500 m	4:15.5
1979	South American Youth Championships	Cochabamba, Bolivia	1st	4 × 400 m relay	3:24.7
1980	Pan American Junior Championships	Sudbury, Canada	1st	800 m	1:47.85
1980	Pan American Junior Championships	Sudbury, Canada	1st	1500 m	3:49.96
1980	South American Junior Championships	Santiago, Chile	1st	400 m	47.17
1980	South American Junior Championships	Santiago, Chile	1st	800 m	1:50.5
1980	South American Junior Championships	Santiago, Chile	1st	4 × 400 m relay	3:13.1
1981	World Cup	Rome, Italy	6th	800 m	1:47.77^{1}
1983	World Championships	Helsinki, Finland	3rd	800 m	1:44.27
1984	Olympic Games	Los Angeles, United States	1st	800 m	1:43.00
1984	Olympic Games	Los Angeles, United States	16th (h)	1500 m	3:41.01^{2}
1987	Pan American Games	Indianapolis, United States	1st	1500 m	3:47.34
1988	Olympic Games	Seoul, South Korea	2nd	800 m	1:43.90
1988	Olympic Games	Seoul, South Korea	11th (h)	1500 m	3:40.92^{3}
1994	Goodwill Games	Saint Petersburg, Russia	7th	800 m	1:47.56
1995	Pan American Games	Mar del Plata, Argentina	1st	1500 m	3:40.26
1995	South American Championships	Manaus, Brazil	2nd^{4}	800 m	1:47.19
1995	World Championships	Gothenburg, Sweden	12th (h)	1500 m	3:39.47^{3}
1996	Olympic Games	Atlanta, United States	42nd (h)	1500 m	3:45.32

^{1} Representing the Americas
^{2} Did not finish in the semifinal
^{3} Did not start in the semifinal
^{4} Out of competition performance

Olympic Games
Preceded by Lothar Christian Munder	Flagbearer for Brazil; Atlanta 1996	Succeeded by Marcelo Apovian
