= Masters W40 400 metres world record progression =

This is the progression of world record improvements of the 400 metres W40 division of Masters athletics.

Key

Incomplete information Pending

Hand	Auto	Athlete	Nationality	Birthdate	Location	Date
	52.50	Geisa Aparecida Coutinho	Brazil	1 June 1980	Bragança Paulista	9 April 2021
	53.05 A	Maria Magnolia Figueiredo	Brazil	11 November 1963	Bogotà	11 July 2004
	53.68 A	Sara Montecinos	Chile	8 March 1954	Cali	20 March 1994
	55.38	Maeve Kyle	Ireland	6 October 1928	Edinburgh	22 July 1970
