= Pedro Rivail Atílio =

Brazilian athlete

Personal information
- Born: 6 March 1961 (age 65)

Sport
- Sport: Athletics
- Event: Hammer throw

Pedro Rivail Atílio (born 6 March 1961) is a retired Brazilian athlete who specialised in the hammer throw. He won multiple medals at regional level.

His personal best in the event is 65.00 metres set in São Paulo in 1987.

== International competitions ==
| Year | Competition | Venue | Position | Event | Notes |
Representing Brazil
| 1977 | South American Youth Championships | Rio de Janeiro, Brazil | 1st | Hammer throw (5 kg) | 51.06 m |
| 1978 | South American Junior Championships | São Paulo, Brazil | 2nd | Hammer throw | 55.66 m |
| 1980 | Pan American Junior Championships | Sudbury, Canada | 6th | Shot put | 13.97 m |
| 1980 | Pan American Junior Championships | Sudbury, Canada | 1st | Hammer throw | 57.56 m |
| 1983 | South American Championships | Santa Fe, Argentina | 3rd | Hammer throw | 59.74 m |
| 1985 | Universiade | Kobe, Japan | 12th | Hammer throw | 61.24 m |
| 1985 | South American Championships | Santiago, Chile | 3rd | Hammer throw | 60.04 m |
| 1986 | Ibero-American Championships | Havana, Cuba | 3rd | Hammer throw | 63.10 m |
| 1987 | Pan American Games | Indianapolis, United States | 4th | Hammer throw | 62.10 m |
| 1987 | South American Championships | São Paulo, Brazil | 2nd | Hammer throw | 62.68 m |
| 1988 | Ibero-American Championships | Mexico City, Mexico | 4th | Hammer throw | 63.18 m |
| 1989 | South American Championships | Medellín, Colombia | 3rd | Hammer throw | 63.34 m |
| 1990 | Ibero-American Championships | Manaus, Brazil | 6th | Hammer throw | 59.92 m |
| 1991 | South American Championships | Manaus, Brazil | 3rd | Hammer throw | 61.32 m |
| 1992 | Ibero-American Championships | Seville, Spain | 7th | Hammer throw | 60.04 m |
| 1995 | South American Championships | Manaus, Brazil | 3rd | Hammer throw | 59.14 m |
| 1996 | Ibero-American Championships | Medellín, Colombia | 6th | Hammer throw | 59.54 m |
| 1997 | South American Championships | Mar del Plata, Argentina | 6th | Hammer throw | 56.70 m |
