= Liliana Góngora =

Argentine middle-distance runner

Personal information
- Full name: Liliana Mariel Góngora
- Nationality: Argentine
- Born: 24 November 1965 (age 60)
- Height: 1.62 m (5 ft 4 in)
- Weight: 49 kg (108 lb)

Sport
- Sport: Middle-distance running
- Events: 1500 m, 3000 m

Liliana Mariel Góngora (born 24 November 1965) is an Argentine middle-distance runner. She competed in the women's 1500 metres at the 1984 Summer Olympics.

== International competitions ==
Year	Competition	Venue	Position	Event	Notes
Representing Argentina
1980	South American Junior Championships	Santiago, Chile	2nd	1500 m	4:45.1
1980	South American Junior Championships	Santiago, Chile	1st	3000 m	10:15.8
1981	South American Junior Championships	Rio de Janeiro, Brazil	1st	1500 m	4:35.7
1981	South American Junior Championships	Rio de Janeiro, Brazil	1st	3000 m	9:58.3
1982	Southern Cross Games	Santa Fe, Argentina	1st	800 m	2:09.06
1982	Southern Cross Games	Santa Fe, Argentina	1st	1500 m	4:25.92
1983	South American Junior Championships	Medellín, Colombia	1st	800 m	2:10.69
1983	South American Junior Championships	Medellín, Colombia	1st	1500 m	4:34.19
1983	Pan American Games	Caracas, Venezuela	12th (h)	800 m	2:13.21
1983	Pan American Games	Caracas, Venezuela	10th	1500 m	4:38.64
1983	South American Championships	Santa Fe, Argentina	7th	800 m	2:09.8
1983	South American Championships	Santa Fe, Argentina	4th	1500 m	4:28.4
1984	Olympic Games	Los Angeles, United States	19th (h)	1500 m	4:28.02
1984	Olympic Games	Los Angeles, United States	25th (h)	3000 m	9.41.14
1984	South American Junior Championships	Caracas, Venezuela	1st	1500 m	4:26.19
1985	South American Championships	Santiago, Chile	4th	1500 m	4:25.00
1985	South American Championships	Santiago, Chile	5th	3000 m	9:35.12
1986	Ibero-American Championships	Havana, Cuba	7th	800 m	2:06.86
1986	Ibero-American Championships	Havana, Cuba	4th	1500 m	4:24.67
1986	South American Games	Santiago, Chile	2nd	800 m	2:08.89
1986	South American Games	Santiago, Chile	1st	1500 m	4:25.87

== Personal bests ==
Outdoor

- 1500 metres – 4:21.9 (1984)
- 3000 metres – 9:34.7 (1984)
