= Alfonso Pitters =

Panamanian athlete

Personal information
- Nationality: Panamanian
- Born: 22 February 1963 (age 63)
- Height: 1.73 m (5 ft 8 in)
- Weight: 66 kg (146 lb)

Sport
- Sport: Sprinting
- Event: 100 metres

Alfonso Pitters (born 22 February 1963) is a Panamanian sprinter. He competed in the men's 100 metres at the 1984 Summer Olympics.

== International competitions ==
Year	Competition	Venue	Position	Event	Notes
Representing Panama
1979	South American Championships	Bucaramanga, Colombia	14th (h)	100 m	21.1
1980	Central American Championships	Guatemala City, Guatemala	2nd	100 m	10.6
1981	Bolivarian Games	Barquisimeto, Venezuela	1st	100 m	10.81
1981	Bolivarian Games	Barquisimeto, Venezuela	2nd	200 m	21.13 (w)
1981	Bolivarian Games	Barquisimeto, Venezuela	1st	4 × 100 m relay	40.21
1984	Olympic Games	Los Angeles, United States	35th (qf)	100 m	10.63
1987	Central American and Caribbean Championships	Caracas, Venezuela	2nd	4 × 100 m relay	40.48
1991	Pan American Games	Havana, Cuba	15th (h)	100 m	10.92

== Personal bests ==
Outdoor

- 100 metres – 10.50 (+1.4 m/s, Los Angeles 1984)
- 100 metres – 10.2h (Panama City 1991)
- 200 metres – 21.1h (San Juan 1982)
