= Athletics at the 1981 Bolivarian Games =

Athletics at the IX Bolivarian Games
- Dates: December 4–14
- Host city: Barquisimeto, Venezuela
- Level: Senior
- Events: 38 (23 men, 15 women)

Athletics competitions at the 1981 Bolivarian Games were held in Barquisimeto, Venezuela, between December 4–14, 1981.

A detailed history of the early editions of the Bolivarian Games between 1938 and 1989 was published in a book written (in Spanish) by José Gamarra Zorrilla, former president of the Bolivian Olympic Committee, and first president (1976-1982) of ODESUR. Gold medal winners from Ecuador were published by the Comité Olímpico Ecuatoriano.

A total of 38 events were contested, 23 by men and 15 by women.

== Medal summary ==
Medal winners were published.

=== Men ===
Event	Gold		Silver		Bronze	
100 metres	Alfonso Pitters (PAN)	10.81	Hipólito Brown (VEN)	10.84	Florencio Aguilar (PAN)	10.87
200 metres (wind: 3.0 m/s)	Héctor Daley (PAN)	21.01 w	Alfonso Pitters (PAN)	21.13 w	Florencio Aguilar (PAN)	21.24 w
400 metres	Héctor Daley (PAN)	45.78	Ramón Reyes (VEN)	48.97	Erick Phillips (VEN)	47.31
800 metres	Ángel Román (VEN)	1:50.11	Gonzalo Huggins (VEN)	1:50.14	Luis Romero Lizardi (VEN)	1:50.48
1500 metres	Gonzalo Huggins (VEN)	3:45.54	Sidro Aular (VEN)	3:46.92	Jacinto Navarrete (COL)	3:48.94
5000 metres	Silvio Salazar (COL)	14:13.93	Jacinto Navarrete (COL)	14:19.86	José Zapata (VEN)	14:21.81
10000 metres	Silvio Salazar (COL)	29:41.99	Luis Tipán (ECU)	30:09.93	Jesús Zapata (VEN)	30:39.89
Marathon	Eduardo Castellanos (VEN)	2:23:07	Otoniel Atehortua (COL)	2:24:08	Luis Camacho (ECU)	2:24:53
110 metres hurdles	Nelson Rodríguez (VEN)	14.42	Elvis Cedeño (VEN)	14.49	Roberto Gonzáles (PER)	14.91
400 metres hurdles	José Davis (VEN)	52.28	Jesús Betancourt (COL)	52.65	Ricardo Diojo (COL)	53.01
3000 metres steeplechase	Lucirio Garrido (VEN)	9:01.81	Jhonny Pérez (BOL)	9:02.90	Regino Munello (VEN)	9:17.73
4 x 100 metres relay	Panama; Alfonso Pitters; Héctor Daley; Fernando Ramsey; Florencio Aguilar	40.21	Venezuela; Anibal Vallenilla; Ángel Andrade; José Chacín; J. Anton	40.46	Colombia; Jesús Betancourt; Fabio García; F. Valois; Manuel Ramírez	41.35
4 x 400 metres relay	Venezuela; Erick Phillips; M. Ulacio; Oswaldo Zea; Ramón Reyes	3:08.50	Colombia; F. Valois; Jesús Betancourt; Gabriel Loperas; Manuel Ramírez	3:13.22	Peru; José Luis Valverde; A. Bassi; Roberto Gonzales; Moisés del Castillo	3:22.66
20 Kilometres Road Walk	Querubín Moreno (COL)	1:37:56	Héctor Moreno (COL)	1:38:07	Mario Rodríguez (PAN)	1:41:15
High Jump	Oscar Orta (VEN)	2.08	Flavio Figueroa (COL)	2.03	Roberto Salazar (VEN)	2.00
Pole vault	Carlos Faneit (VEN)	4.50	Manuel Fuentes (VEN)	4.40	Freddy Aberdeen (VEN)	3.90
Long Jump	Oswaldo Torres (VEN)	7.42			Henry Pastorelli (PER)	7.07
Triple Jump	Esteban Copland (VEN)	14.87	Juan Marcovich (PER)	14.77	Flavio Figueroa (COL)	14.68
Shot Put	William Romero (VEN)	15.58	José Carreño (VEN)	15.33	Wilfredo Jaimes (VEN)	14.50
Discus Throw	Luis Palacios (VEN)	49.38	Wilfredo Jaimes (VEN)	47.70	Douglas Fernández (VEN)	46.32
Hammer throw	Edgar Yarce (COL)	54.10	Raúl Ramón (ECU)	51.72	Rafael Aranaga (VEN)	51.12
Javelin throw	Eustacio de León (PAN)	71.06	Luis Lucumí (COL)	70.22	Douglas Fernández (VEN)	68.28
Decathlon	Freddy Aberdeen (VEN)	6743	Juan Ríos (VEN)	6620	Félix Marrubo (COL)	6298

=== Women ===
Event	Gold		Silver		Bronze	
100 metres (wind: 2.4 m/s)	Carmela Bolívar (PER)	11.91 w	Martha Meléndez (COL)	12.31 w	Nancy Guevara (VEN)	12.33 w
200 metres	Eucaris Caicedo (COL)	24.10	Carmela Bolívar (PER)	24.59	Ángela Mancilla (COL)	24.66
400 metres	Eucaris Caicedo (COL)	53.64	Florencia Chilberry (VEN)	55.19	Ángela Mancilla (COL)	55.40
800 metres	Marisela de Díaz (VEN)	2:10.49	Luz Villa (COL)	2:11.26	Virginia Davis (VEN)	2:12.44
1500 metres	Marisela de Díaz (VEN)	4:29.80	Elida Rodríguez (VEN)	4:34.87	Nancy Chiliquinga (ECU)	4:42.03
3000 metres	Marisela de Díaz (VEN)	9:59.97	Nancy Chiliquinga (ECU)	10:02.59	Mery Rojas (BOL)	10:09.43
100 metres hurdles	Nancy Vallecilla (ECU)	13.83	Angie Marie Regis (VEN)	14.10	Ingrid Castillo (VEN)	16.52
4 x 100 metres relay	Colombia; P. Morales; Martha Meléndez; Ángela Mancilla; Eucaris Caicedo	45.8	Peru; María Bustios; Carmela Bolívar; Rocío Roca; Brigitte Winter	47.5		
4 x 400 metres relay	Colombia; Amparo Alba; Martha Meléndez; Ángela Mancilla; Eucaris Caicedo	3:44.38	Venezuela; Belkis Subero; E. Guzmán; E. Constanti; Florencia Chilberry	3:50.72	Peru; Brigitte Winter; Sonia Galdos; María Bustios; Carmela Bolívar	4:12.90
High Jump	Iraima Parra (VEN)	1.65	Alix Castillo (VEN)	1.55	Miraida Piñango (VEN)	1.50
Long Jump	Nancy Guevara (VEN)	6.00	Sorelis Bohórquez (VEN)	6.00	Tania Sangronis (VEN)	5.84
Shot Put	Magdalena Gómez (COL)	14.51	María Isabel Urrutia (COL)	13.34	Patricia Guerrero (PER)	13.20
Discus Throw	María Isabel Urrutia (COL)	42.76	Yunaira Piña (VEN)	42.64	Selene Saldarriaga (COL)	41.10
Javelin throw	Mariela Riera (VEN)	48.94	Patricia Guerrero (PER)	47.78	Yunaira Piña (VEN)	47.12
Heptathlon	Nancy Vallecilla (ECU)	5375	Alix Castillo (VEN)	4749	Ingrid Castillo (VEN)	4626

== Medal table (unofficial) ==
* Host nation (Venezuela)

Rank	Nation	Gold	Silver	Bronze	Total
1	Venezuela (VEN)*	20	18	18	56
2	Colombia (COL)	10	10	8	28
3	Panama (PAN)	5	1	3	9
4	Ecuador (ECU)	2	3	2	7
5	Peru (PER)	1	4	5	10
6	Bolivia (BOL)	0	1	1	2
Totals (6 entries)		38	37	37	112
