= Liliana Arigoni =

Argentine athlete

Personal information
- Full name: Liliana Beatriz Arigoni
- Nationality: Argentine
- Born: 6 March 1963 (age 63)
- Height: 1.83 m (6 ft 0 in)
- Weight: 68 kg (150 lb)

Sport
- Sport: Athletics
- Event: High jump

Liliana Beatriz Arigoni (born 6 March 1963) is an Argentine athlete. She competed in the women's high jump at the 1984 Summer Olympics.

Her personal best in the event is 1.90 metres set in Santa Fe in 1984. This is a former national record.

== International competitions ==
Year	Competition	Venue	Position	Notes
Representing Argentina
1979	Pan American Games	San Juan, Puerto Rico	9th	1.74 m
1979	South American Championships	Bucaramanga, Colombia	2nd	1.75 m
1980	Pan American Junior Championships	Sudbury, Canada	1st	1.82 m
1980	South American Junior Championships	Santiago, Chile	1st	1.76 m
1981	South American Junior Championships	Rio de Janeiro, Brazil	3rd	1.65 m
1981	South American Championships	La Paz, Bolivia	3rd	1.71 m
1983	South American Championships	Santa Fe, Argentina	3rd	1.71 m
1984	Olympic Games	Los Angeles, United States	24th (q)	1.80 m
