= Athletics at the 1985 Summer Universiade – Men's hammer throw =

The men's hammer throw event at the 1985 Summer Universiade was held at the Kobe Universiade Memorial Stadium in Kobe on 29 August 1985.

== Results ==
Rank	Athlete	Nationality	Result	Notes
1st place, gold medalist(s)	Heinz Weis	West Germany	76.00	
2nd place, silver medalist(s)	Lucio Serrani	Italy	74.08	
3rd place, bronze medalist(s)	Igor Nikulin	Soviet Union	74.04	
4	Igor Grigorash	Soviet Union	72.38	
5	Plamen Minev	Bulgaria	71.82	
6	Michael Beierl	Austria	71.58	
7	Ken Flax	United States	68.86	
8	Brian Masterson	United States	67.62	
9	Raúl Jimeno	Spain	64.54	
10	Jari Matinolli	Finland	63.26	
11	Ken Kasai	Japan	63.06	
12	Pedro Rivail Attílio	Brazil	61.24	
