= Athletics at the 1987 Pan American Games – Men's hammer throw =

Men's hammer throw at the Pan American Games

The men's hammer throw event at the 1987 Pan American Games was held in Indianapolis, United States on 10 August.

== Results ==
Rank	Name	Nationality	#1	#2	#3	#4	#5	#6	Result	Notes
1st place, gold medalist(s)	Jud Logan	United States	76.66	77.24	74.24	x	72.60	x	77.24	GR
~~2~~	Bill Green	United States	~~76.30~~	~~x~~	~~x~~	~~73.14~~	~~74.08~~	~~73.84~~	~~76.30~~	Doping
2nd place, silver medalist(s)	Andrés Charadía	Argentina	x	65.32	67.12	x	66.72	69.36	69.36	
3rd place, bronze medalist(s)	Vicente Sánchez	Cuba	65.60	65.56	65.60	65.18	x	66.02	66.02	
4	Pedro Rivail Attílio	Brazil	60.92	x	62.10	x	x	x	62.10	
5	David Castrillón	Colombia	60.22	60.56	59.28	60.12	x	60.78	60.78	
