= Jacinto Navarrete =

Colombian middle-distance runner

Personal information
- Born: 1 August 1962 (age 63)

Sport
- Country: Colombia
- Sport: Athletics
- Team: Lotería de Cundinamarca
- Coached by: Jairo Cubillos

Achievements and titles
- Personal best: 1500m 3:43.22, 5000m 13:49.40, Half marathon 1:08:56, 3000m 7:49.46
- Updated on 13 August 2016

Jacinto Germán Navarrete Rodríguez (born 1 August 1962) is a Colombian retired athlete who competed in middle-distance and cross-country events. He represented his country at two World Indoor Championships and currently holds the South American record in the indoor 3000 metres.

== Competition record ==
Year	Competition	Venue	Position	Event	Notes
Representing Colombia
1980	South American Junior Championships	Santiago, Chile	1st	1500 m	3:55.4
1980	South American Junior Championships	Santiago, Chile	1st	5000 m	14:40.3
1981	Central American and Caribbean Championships	Santo Domingo, Dominican Republic	3rd	5000 m	14:12.33
1981	South American Junior Championships	Rio de Janeiro, Brazil	8th	1500 m	3:57.8
1981	South American Junior Championships	Rio de Janeiro, Brazil	1st	5000 m	14:22.2
1981	Bolivarian Games	Barquisimeto, Venezuela	3rd	1500 m	3:48.94
1981	Bolivarian Games	Barquisimeto, Venezuela	2nd	5000 m	14:19.86
1986	Central American and Caribbean Games	Santiago de los Caballeros, Dominican Republic	1st	1500 m	3:43.72
1986	Ibero-American Championships	Havana, Cuba	4th	1500 m	3:46.21
1986	Ibero-American Championships	Havana, Cuba	4th	5000 m	13:52.91
1987	World Indoor Championships	Indianapolis, United States	9th	3000 m	8:11.89
1991	World Indoor Championships	Seville, Spain	9th	3000 m	7:49.46
1991	World Cross Country Championships	Antwerp, Belgium	57th	long race	35:20
1994	South American Games	Valencia, Venezuela	2nd	1500 m	3:48.67
1994	South American Games	Valencia, Venezuela	1st	5000 m	14:10.3
1995	South American Championships	Manaus, Brazil	3rd	1500 m	3:44.27
1995	South American Championships	Manaus, Brazil	3rd	5000 m	14:07.63
1996	Ibero-American Championships	Medellín, Colombia	6th	1500 m	3:47.00
1997	World Cross Country Championships	Turin, Italy	92nd	long race	37:45
1998	World Cross Country Championships	Marrakesh, Morocco	56th	long race	36:38
1998	Colombian Championships	Bucaramanga, Colombia	3rd	5000 m	14:10.5
1999	World Cross Country Championships	Belfast, Northern Ireland	74th	long race	43:06

== Personal bests ==
Outdoor

- 1500 metres – 3:43.22 (Maia 1995)
- 5000 metres – 13:49.40 (Cali 1995)
- 10 kilometers – 28:37 (Plant City 1989) NR
- 15 kilometers – 43:09 (Tampa 1989) NR
- Half Marathon – 1:08:56 (Guayaquil 2003)

Indoor

- Mile – 3:59.87 (Moscow 1987)
- 3000 metres – 7:49.46 (Seville 1991) AR
- Two miles – 8:29.0 (San Diego 1987)
