= Clinton Davis =

American sprinter

Personal information
- Nationality: American
- Born: August 17, 1965 (age 60) Pittsburgh, Pennsylvania, U.S.
- Height: 5 ft 11 in (1.80 m)
- Weight: 165 lb (75 kg)

Sport
- Sport: Track and field
- Events: 200 metres, 400 metres
- Club: New Image Track Club
- Coached by: Elbert Kennedy

Achievements and titles
- Personal bests: 200 m: 20.29 (University Park 1983); 400 m: 46.29 (Shippensburg 1982)
Medal record
Men's Athletics
Representing the United States
Pan American Junior Championships
Gold medal – first place	1982 Barquisimeto	200 m
Gold medal – first place	1982 Barquisimeto	4×100 m relay
Gold medal – first place	1982 Barquisimeto	4×400 m relay

Clinton Davis (born August 17, 1965) is an American former track athlete. He was an outstanding sprinter while at Steel Valley High School.

Davis was recruited by UCLA, but after an exceptional high school career chose to turn pro early. He was Track and Field News "High School Athlete of the Year" in 1983.

Awards
Preceded by Darrell Robinson	Track & Field News High School Boys Athlete of the Year; 1983	Succeeded by Roy Martin
Preceded by Bill Fralic	Pittsburgh Post-Gazette Boys Athlete of the Year; 1982, 1983	Succeeded by Brian Davis & Sean Shapert
Records
Preceded by Paul Narracott	Boys' World Youth Best Holder, 200 metres 1 August 1982 – 12 May 2001	Succeeded by DaBryan Blanton
Preceded by Bill Green	Boys' World Youth Best Holder, 400 metres 29 May 1982 – 13 May 1984	Succeeded by Henry Thomas
