= 1980 Central American Championships in Athletics =

IX Central American Championships in Athletics
- Dates: 5–8 November 1980
- Host city: Guatemala City, Guatemala
- Venue: Estadio Mateo Flores
- Level: Senior
- Events: 39
- Participation: 3 nations

The 9th Central American Championships in Athletics were held in Guatemala City, Guatemala, between 5 and 8 November 1980.

A total of 39 events were contested, 24 by men, 15 by women.

== Medal summary ==
=== Men ===
Event	Gold		Silver		Bronze	
100 metres	Héctor Daley; Panama	10.5	Alfonso Pitters; Panama	10.6	Emilio Moss; Guatemala	10.7
200 metres	Héctor Daley; Panama	21.2	Víctor Henry; Panama	22.0	Emilio Moss; Guatemala	22.1
400 metres	Alfonso Pitters; Panama	49.8	Francisco Recinos; Guatemala	50.0	Orlando Ruano; Guatemala	50.2
800 metres	Cristobal Méndez; Panama	1:54.4	Orlando Ruano; Guatemala	1:58.5	Francisco López; El Salvador	1:59.5
1500 metres	Francisco Piedra; Guatemala	4:07.2	Luis Aguillón; El Salvador	4:09.1	Jesús Jérez; Guatemala	4:10.7
5000 metres	Óscar Lara; Guatemala	15:22.9	José Hernández; El Salvador	15:52.9	Juan Vásquez; El Salvador	15:57.6
10,000 metres	Virgilio Herrera; Guatemala	31:00.5	Jaime Hernández; El Salvador	33:19.2	Juan Francisco Vásquez; El Salvador	33:20.9
Marathon	Carlos Cuque López; Guatemala	2:19:20	Juan Sacarías; Guatemala	2:32:36	Carlos Acosta; Guatemala	2:41:30
110 metres hurdles	Salvador Ruiz; Panama	15.7	Roy Bennett; Guatemala	15.8	Milton Gálvez; Guatemala	16.7
400 metres hurdles	Salvador Ruiz; Panama	55.3	Fidel Camargo; Panama	56.1	Rubén Quintanilla; El Salvador	56.7
3000 metres steeplechase	Óscar Lara; Guatemala	9:57.5	Luis Alfonso; El Salvador	10:17.3	Rolando Martínez; Panama	10:24.4
4 × 100 metres relay	Guatemala	43.1	El Salvador	43.3	Only two finishing teams	
4 × 400 metres relay	Panama	3:22.5	El Salvador	3:25.2	Guatemala	3:26.4
20 kilometres walk	Mario Rodríguez; Panama	1:37:01	José Alonso; Guatemala	1:39:34	Leonel Ramos; Panama	1:41:26
50 kilometres walk	Arturo Calderón; Guatemala	5:07:53 NR	Marco Juárez; Guatemala	5:10:51	Ricardo Concepción; Panama	5:14:53
High jump	Gerardo Alcazar; Guatemala	1.80	Ernesto Oqueli; El Salvador	1.75	Omar Martínez; Guatemala	1.75
Pole vault	Rudy Aguilar; El Salvador	3.45	Manolo Fearon; Guatemala	3.45	Omar Martínez; Guatemala	3.30
Long jump	Salomón Rowe; Guatemala	7.48	Héctor Murillo; Panama	6.58	Danilo Melgar; Guatemala	6.50
Triple jump	Salomón Rowe; Guatemala	15.22	Héctor Murillo; Panama	14.77	Samuel Abarca; El Salvador	13.53
Shot put	César Sajche; Guatemala	13.40	Eustacio de León; Panama	13.22	Juan Enrique Galdámez; El Salvador	13.12
Discus throw	César Sajche; Guatemala	37.66	Marcelo Gaytán; Guatemala	35.70	Eduardo Hasbún; El Salvador	34.92
Hammer throw	Juan Pedro Varela; El Salvador	44.70	Hugo Berganza; Guatemala	38.30	Igor Morales; Guatemala	37.80
Javelin throw	Eustacio de León; Panama	64.05	Rudy Aguilar; El Salvador	63.14	Héctor Phemmings; Panama	60.64
Decathlon	Rudy Aguilar; El Salvador	5782	Sergio Catalán; Guatemala	5516	Manuel Carranza; Guatemala	4547

=== Women ===
Event	Gold		Silver		Bronze	
100 metres	Zaida Núñez; Panama	12.0	Mayra Figueroa; Guatemala	12.3	Patricia Quiñónez; Guatemala	12.4
200 metres	Zaida Núñez; Panama	25.0	Christa Schumann; Guatemala	26.0	Irma Ambulo; Panama	26.1
400 metres	Patricia Meighan; Guatemala	58.1	Irma Ambulo; Panama	58.5	Zaida Núñez; Panama	59.9
800 metres	Patricia Meighan; Guatemala	2:21.2	Sonia Lemus; Guatemala	2:23.2	Norma Franco; El Salvador	2:28.8
1500 metres	Norma Franco; El Salvador	5:01.6	Kriscia García; El Salvador	5:07.2	Cristina Girón; Guatemala	5:07.2
100 metres hurdles	Amapola Arimany; Guatemala	15.7	Mayra Figueroa; Guatemala	15.9	Analú Gálvez; Guatemala	18.1
400 metres hurdles	Patricia Meighan; Guatemala	65.5	Mayra Figueroa; Guatemala	68.5	Rina Francos; El Salvador	72.3
4 × 100 metres relay	El Salvador	51.4	Only one finishing team			
4 × 400 metres relay	Guatemala	4:10.5	El Salvador	4:11.5	Only two finishing teams	
High jump	María Stella Pacheco; Guatemala	1.53	Nora Hernández; Guatemala	1.53	Sintia Rollox; Panama	1.40
Long jump	Christa Schumann; Guatemala	5.06	Nora Hernández; Guatemala	4.79	Sonia Chávez; El Salvador	4.77
Shot put	Marta Centeno; Guatemala	11.06	Yolanda Marquínez; Panama	10.45	María Eugenia Díaz; Guatemala	9.45
Discus throw	Patricia Comandari; El Salvador	34.88	Marta Centeno; Guatemala	34.50	Yolanda Marquínez; Panama	34.22
Javelin throw	Carmen Valenzuela; Guatemala	32.81	Carmen Miller; Guatemala	31.10	Maricela Sol; El Salvador	27.32
Heptathlon	Amapola Arimany; Guatemala	2976	María Stella Pacheco; Guatemala	2868	Lucrecia Aragón; Guatemala	2425

== Medal table ==
* Host nation (Guatemala)

Rank	Nation	Gold	Silver	Bronze	Total
1	Guatemala (GUA)*	22	20	17	59
2	Panama (PAN)	11	8	8	27
3	El Salvador (ESA)	6	10	10	26
Totals (3 entries)		39	38	35	112
