= Héctor Daley =

Panamanian sprinter

Personal information
- Born: 22 November 1961 (age 63)

Sport
- Country: Panama
- Sport: Athletics
- Event(s): 200 m, 400 m

Héctor Daley (born 22 November 1961) is a retired Panamanian sprinter who competed in the 200 and 400 metres. He represented his country at two World Championships, in 1983 and 1987.

== International competitions ==
Year	Competition	Venue	Position	Event	Notes
Representing Panama
1979	South American Championships	Bucaramanga, Colombia	3rd	200 m	21.1
1979	South American Championships	Bucaramanga, Colombia	3rd	400 m	47.40
1980	Pan American Junior Championships	Sudbury, Canada	3rd	200 m	20.98 (w)
1980	Pan American Junior Championships	Sudbury, Canada	1st	400 m	46.12
1980	Central American Championships	Guatemala City, Guatemala	1st	100 m	10.5
1980	Central American Championships	Guatemala City, Guatemala	1st	200 m	21.2
1981	Central American and Caribbean Championships	Santo Domingo, Dominican Republic	3rd	200 m	20.96
1981	Central American and Caribbean Championships	Santo Domingo, Dominican Republic	2nd	400 m	45.96
1981	World Cup	Rome, Italy	3rd	4 × 400 m relay	3:02.01^{1}
1981	South American Championships	La Paz, Bolivia	2nd	200 m	20.5
1981	Bolivarian Games	Barquisimeto, Venezuela	1st	200 m	21.01 (w)
1981	Bolivarian Games	Barquisimeto, Venezuela	1st	400 m	45.78
1981	Bolivarian Games	Barquisimeto, Venezuela	1st	4 × 100 m relay	40.21
1982	Central American and Caribbean Games	Havana, Cuba	5th	200 m	21.28
1982	Central American and Caribbean Games	Havana, Cuba	– (f)	400 m	DNS
1983	World Championships	Helsinki, Finland	28th (h)	200 m	21.49^{2}
1983	World Championships	Helsinki, Finland	18th (qf)	400 m	46.42
1985	South American Championships	Santiago, Chile	1st	400 m	46.06
1985	World Cup	Canberra, Australia	6th	400 m	46.04^{1}
1985	World Cup	Canberra, Australia	6th	4 × 400 m relay	3:03.52^{1}
1986	Central American and Caribbean Games	Santiago, Dominican Republic	4th	400 m	46.05
1987	Central American and Caribbean Championships	Caracas, Venezuela	5th	400 m	46.08
1987	Central American and Caribbean Championships	Caracas, Venezuela	2nd	4 × 100 m relay	40.48
1987	Pan American Games	Indianapolis, United States	5th	400 m	45.56
1987	World Championships	Rome, Italy	24th (qf)	400 m	46.05
1987	South American Championships	São Paulo, Brazil	1st	400 m	45.80
1989	South American Championships	Medellín, Colombia	7th	400 m	47.47

^{1}Representing the Americas
^{2}Did not start in the quarterfinals

== Personal bests ==
Outdoor

- 200 metres – 20.67 (+0.4 m/s, Walnut 1980)
- 400 metres – 45.29 (Ciudad Bolívar 1981)
