= Lee Balkin =

American high jumper

Personal information
- Full name: Lee Balkin
- Nationality: United States
- Born: June 7, 1961 (age 65)
- Height: 6 ft 3.5 in (1.918 m)
- Weight: 165 lb (75 kg)

Sport
- Sport: Track and Field
- Event: High Jump
Medal record
Men's Track and Field
Representing United States
Pan American Junior Athletics Championships
Gold medal – first place	1980 Sudbury	High Jump

Lee Balkin (born June 7, 1961) is a retired American high jumper. He competed at the 1987 World Championships without reaching the final. His personal best jump is 2.33 metres, achieved in July 1987 in Durham.

Balkin holds the school record in the high jump at Glendale High School in Glendale, California. On the outset that might not sound impressive, but the previous record was held by Dwight Stones, who was already a double Olympic medalist and the National High School Record holder. At the 1979 CIF California State Meet, Balkin jumped 7' 3½" which is still the state meet record.

Balkin later attended the University of California, Los Angeles, where he again surpassed Stones and is the number two high jumper on the school's top ten list.

Even while still jumping competitively, Balkin started coaching jumpers as an assistant coach at Glendale Community College. He remains there as both coach and teacher.
