= Polly Plumer =

American track and field athlete

Personal information
- Full name: Polly Plumer
- Nationality: United States

Sport
- Sport: Track and Field
- Event: middle distances
- College team: UCLA Bruins
Medal record
Women's Track and Field
Representing United States
Pan American Junior Athletics Championships
Gold medal – first place	1982 Barquisimeto	1500 m

Polly Anne Plumer (born 14 October 1964) is an American track and field athlete who set the National High School record holder in the Mile run at 4:35.24, in open competition at UCLA May 16, 1982 while a student at University High School (Irvine, California). That distance is no longer run in high school competition since the NFHS converted to metric distances in 1980, but it is still an international record event. Her record lasted over 30 years until it was surpassed on January 26, 2013 by Mary Cain, indoors, running 4:32.78 at the New Balance Games. Cain later improved her own mark to 4:28.25, also indoors at the Millrose Games. Because Cain's marks were set on an indoor track, which is generally considered to be more difficult, they were not recognized by Track and Field News the ratifier of high school records in non-NFHS sanctioned events (high school athletes in open competition), so Plumer retains the record as published. Christine Babcock, born 8 years and 3 days after Plumer's record, running for Woodbridge High School, also in Irvine, took the record in the more commonly run but shorter 1600 meters to an equitable 4:33.82 in 2008. Babcock's record was improved to 4:33.29 in 2014 by Alexa Efraimson.

A couple of weeks after setting the record, Plumer won her third consecutive championship in the 1600 metres at the CIF California State Meet. Only Kira Jorgensen has duplicated that feat. Plumer's state meet record of 4:39.82 stood for 25 years, from 1982 to 2007, until being beaten by Babcock.

The University High School team of that time has been considered one of the best high school teams ever assembled. In 1981, Plumer was part of the team's course record at Mt. SAC, the most commonly used course in Southern California, that stood for two decades. The team, including Plumer, Laura Sauerwein, Judy McLaughlin and Teresa Barrios continue to hold the national high school record for the 4x1500 meters relay at 18.52.5, set during the Mt. SAC Relays in 1982.

Her older sister is PattiSue Plumer, who ran collegiately for Stanford University. After high school, Polly Plumer ran for UCLA, winning multiple All American Honors, despite suffering serious injuries and illnesses. She ran in the 3000 metres at the 1988 Olympic Trials, finishing 10th in her heat, and the 1992 Olympic Trials, finishing 12th in her semi final in the 1500 and 10th in her semifinal in the 3000. Each time she ran in the trials, her sister also ran and qualified for the Olympic team in those events. The alliterative nature of both their names and their competition in the same events has led to confusion amongst some spectators. Polly is blonde, while PattiSue has darker hair.
