= 1979 South American Youth Championships in Athletics =

VI South American Youth Championships in Athletics
- Dates: August 3–5
- Host city: Cochabamba, Bolivia
- Level: Youth
- Events: 32
- Participation: about 113 athletes from 5 nations

The 6th South American Youth Championships in Athletics were held in Cochabamba, Bolivia from August 3–5, 1979.

== Medal summary ==
Medal winners are published for boys and girls. Complete results can be found on the "World Junior Athletics History" website. All results are marked as "affected by altitude" (A), because Cochabamba is located at 2,558 metres above sea level.

=== Men ===
Event	Gold		Silver		Bronze	
100 metres	Carlos García (BOL)	10.8A	Robson da Silva (BRA)	11.0A	Romeu Emigdio (BRA)	11.2A
200 metres	Douglas Murillo (VEN)	22.3A	Carlos García (BOL)	22.4A	Robson da Silva (BRA)	22.6A
400 metres	Joaquim Cruz (BRA)	48.3A	Douglas Murillo (VEN)	48.6A	Oswaldo Zea (VEN)	50.6A
800 metres	Joaquim Cruz (BRA)	1:58.6A	Aaron Phillips (VEN)	2:02.4A	Robinson Parra (VEN)	2:03.4A
1500 metres	Joaquim Cruz (BRA)	4:15.5A	Carlos Oliveira (BRA)	4:22.9A	Robinson Parra (VEN)	4:23.7A
3000 metres	Eduardo Arias (BOL)	9:58.2A	Eduardo Quincho (PER)	10:00.2A	Dartel Ferreira (BRA)	10:05.6A
1500 metres steeplechase	Josevandro Souza (BRA)	4:57.4A	Dartel de Lima (BRA)	4:57.7A	Pedro Paz (BOL)	5:03.3A
110 metres hurdles	César Lugo (VEN)	15.3A	Nelio Moura (BRA)	15.4A	Wilmer Pérez (VEN)	15.6A
300 metres hurdles	José Dantas (BRA)	40.5A	Nelio Moura (BRA)	40.8A	Wilmer Pérez (VEN)	41.5A
High jump	Milton Riitano Francisco (BRA)	1.90A	Javier Goriyo (PER)	1.70A	Ricardo Falconi (PER)	1.70A
Long jump	José Florêncio da Silva (BRA)	6.93A	João Batista Dias (BRA)	6.82A	José Torres (VEN)	6.42A
Triple jump	Nelio Moura (BRA)	14.16A	José Florêncio da Silva (BRA)	13.78A	Darío Peralta (PAR)	13.12A
Shot put	Leonardo Rodríguez (VEN)	14.37A	João Caversan (BRA)	14.29A	Eliomar Pando (BRA)	12.86A
Discus throw	Heliomar Pando (BRA)	43.92A	Leonardo Rodríguez (VEN)	43.52A	João Caversan (BRA)	40.72A
Hammer throw	Marcos Frustockl (BRA)	56.58A	Carlos Cúneo (PER)	38.58A	Darío Peralta (PAR)	25.50A
Javelin throw	Washington Espínola (BRA)	44.88A	Leonardo Rodríguez (VEN)	43.22A	Darío Peralta (PAR)	42.44A
Hexathlon	Ricardo de Campos (BRA)	3532A	Javier Gordillo (PER)	3308A	José Torres (VEN)	3171A
4 × 100 metres relay	Brazil; Robson da Silva; Romeu Emigdio; Akitisi de Souza	43.1A	Bolivia; Rommy Fischer; Marcelo Rejas; J. Taira; Carlos García	43.4A	Venezuela; Oswaldo Zea; Solano; Enrique Villasana; Victor Carrasquel	44.4A
4 × 400 metres relay	Brazil; Joaquim Cruz; E. Paulo; Carlos de Oliveira; Erivaldino Souza	3:24.7A	Venezuela; Douglas Murillo; Oswaldo Zea; Aaron Phillips; Victor Carrasquel	3:28.6A	Bolivia; J. Taira; F. Vaca; Gabriel Mariaca; G. Julian	3:34.4A

=== Women ===
Event	Gold		Silver		Bronze	
100 metres	Sueli Machado (BRA)	12.0A	Maria Inês Simões (BRA)	12.1A	Brigitte Winter (PER)	12.4A
200 metres	Sueli Machado (BRA)	24.8A	Maria Inês Simões (BRA)	25.1A	Belkis Subero (VEN)	26.0A
400 metres	Cláudia Adolfo (BRA)	58.0A	Belkis Subero (VEN)	58.9A	Carla Giussani (BOL)	59.6A
800 metres	Cláudia Adolfo (BRA)	2:25.3A	Marisa da Silva (BRA)	2:26.7A	Ester Villegas (BOL)	2:26.7A
80 metres hurdles	Maria de Jesus (BRA)	12.6A	Gloria Loayza (PER)	12.8A	Patricia Sánchez (PER)	13.8A
High jump	Liliana Lohmann (BRA)	1.50A	Sheila Mori (PER)	1.50A	Ana Cristina Bordón (PAR)	1.45A
Long jump	Sorelis Bohórquez (VEN)	5.71A	Tania Sangronis (VEN)	5.51A	Cláudia da Costa (BRA)	5.48A
Shot put	Mara Misson (BRA)	11.56A	Luz Bohórquez (VEN)	11.35A	Solange Reimundo (BRA)	10.10A
Discus throw	Josiany Gambi (BRA)	37.38A	Yunaira Piña (VEN)	36.62A	Solange Reimundo (BRA)	34.94A
Javelin throw	Yunaira Piña (VEN)	38.86A	Magnolia Corrêa (BRA)	34.96A	Hanny Basurco (PER)	29.94A
Pentathlon	Liliana Lohmann (BRA)	3025A	Maria de Jesus (BRA)	2918A	Milka Murdoch (PAR)	2648A
4 × 100 metres relay	Peru; Brigitte Winter; Connie Basurco; Panizo; Rosario Heredia	49.2A	Venezuela; Sorellis Bohorquez; Griseria Palacios; Yusela Sánchez; Belkis Subero	49.8A	Brazil; Sueli Machado; Machado; Maria da Conceiçao; Maria Simões	52.5A
4 × 400 metres relay	Brazil; Cláudia Adolfo; Maria Simões; Sueli Machado; S. de Souza	4:00.0A	Venezuela; Yaneth Carvajal; Chirinos; Dora Medina; Belkis Subero	4:20.3A	Peru; Monica Sánchez; Gloria Loayza; Rosario Heredia; Connie Basurco	4:30.5A

== Medal table (unofficial) ==
* Host nation (Bolivia)

Rank	Nation	Gold	Silver	Bronze	Total
1	Brazil (BRA)	24	13	9	46
2	Venezuela (VEN)	5	11	9	25
3	Bolivia (BOL)*	2	2	4	8
4	Peru (PER)	1	6	5	12
5	Paraguay (PAR)	0	0	5	5
Totals (5 entries)		32	32	32	96

== Participation (unofficial) ==
Detailed result lists can be found on the "World Junior Athletics History" website. An unofficial count yields the number of about 113 athletes from about 5 countries:

- Bolivia (16)
- Brazil (37)
- Paraguay (4)
- (Peru) Perú (31)
- Venezuela (25)
