= DaBryan Blanton =

American sprinter

Personal information
- Nationality: United States
- Born: July 3, 1984 (age 41) Forney, Texas
- Height: 5 ft 11 in (1.80 m)
- Weight: 155 lb (70 kg)

Sport
- Sport: Running
- Event: Sprints
- College team: Oklahoma Sooners
- Club: Nike
- Coached by: Shanon Atkinson

Achievements and titles
- Personal best(s): 100 m: 10.07 (Lincoln 2003); 200 m: 20.37 (Austin 2001)

DaBryan Blanton (born July 3, 1984) is an American sprint athlete. He attended the University of Oklahoma, where he was a three-time Big 12 champion in the 100 metres, until 2005, when he decided to sign a professional contract with Nike.

In his freshman season at Oklahoma, while still a junior athlete by IAAF standards, Blanton ran a 10.07 in the 100 metres, which at the time tied Stanley Floyd's American Junior Record.

A native of Forney, Texas, Blanton also played football in high school, and was ranked the No. 47 prospect in the nation by Rivals.com.

Records
| Preceded by Clinton Davis | Boys' World Youth Best Holder, 200 metres 12 May 2001 – 5 April 2003 | Succeeded by Usain Bolt |
