= Elvis Cedeño =

Venezuelan athlete (born 1964)

Personal information
- Nationality: Venezuelan
- Born: 21 May 1964 (age 61)

Sport
- Sport: Athletics
- Event: 110 metres hurdles

Elvis Cedeño (born 21 May 1964) is a retired Venezuelan athlete who specialised in the 110 metres hurdles. He represented his country at the 1991 World Championships without advancing from the first round.

His personal best in the event is 13.62 set in Mexico City in 1988. This is the standing national record.

== International competitions ==
Year	Competition	Venue	Position	Event	Notes
Representing Venezuela
1981	South American Junior Championships	Rio de Janeiro, Brazil	1st	110 m hurdles	14.5
1981	Bolivarian Games	Barquisimeto, Venezuela	2nd	110 m hurdles	14.49
1982	Pan American Junior Championships	Barquisimeto, Venezuela	3rd	110 m hurdles	14.62
1982	Pan American Junior Championships	Barquisimeto, Venezuela	3rd	4 × 100 m relay	41.01
1983	Pan American Games	Caracas, Venezuela	8th	110 m hurdles	14.42
1988	Ibero-American Championships	Mexico City, Mexico	6th	110 m hurdles	14.08
1989	Central American and Caribbean Championships	San Juan, Puerto Rico	2nd	110 m hurdles	14.09
1989	South American Championships	Medellín, Colombia	3rd	110 m hurdles	14.1
1990	Central American and Caribbean Games	Mexico City, Mexico	3rd	110 m hurdles	14.18
1990	Central American and Caribbean Games	Mexico City, Mexico	3rd	4 × 100 m relay	40.65
1991	South American Championships	Manaus, Brazil	2nd	110 m hurdles	14.23
1991	Pan American Games	Havana, Cuba	8th	110 m hurdles	14.11
1991	World Championships	Tokyo, Japan	28th (h)	110 m hurdles	13.85
1994	South American Games	Valencia, Venezuela	3rd	110 m hurdles	14.46
