= Maria Magnólia Figueiredo =

Brazilian athlete

Personal information
- Born: 11 November 1963 (age 62) Natal, Rio Grande do Norte, Brazil

Sport
- Sport: Track and field

Maria Magnólia de Souza Figueiredo (born 11 November 1963) is a retired Brazilian athlete who competed in the 400 and 800 metres. She represented her country at the 1988 and 1996 Summer Olympics, as well as four World Championships.

She has personal bests of 22.99 in the 200 metres (1988) and 50.62 in the 400 metres (1990). The latter is the current national record. Her time of 53.05 set in 2004 at altitude is the current Women's Masters 400 metres world record over the age of 40.

== Competition record ==
Year	Competition	Venue	Position	Event	Notes
Representing Brazil
1978	South American Youth Championships	Montevideo, Uruguay	4th	100 m	12.88
1978	South American Youth Championships	Montevideo, Uruguay	5th	200 m	26.31
1978	South American Youth Championships	Montevideo, Uruguay	3rd	4 × 100 m relay	49.88
1978	South American Youth Championships	Montevideo, Uruguay	3rd	4 × 400 m relay	4:10.0
1980	South American Junior Championships	Santiago, Chile	5th	100 m	12.46
1980	South American Junior Championships	Santiago, Chile	3rd	4 × 100 m relay	47.64
1981	South American Junior Championships	Rio de Janeiro, Brazil	2nd	200 m	24.8
1981	South American Junior Championships	Rio de Janeiro, Brazil	1st	4 × 100 m relay	46.4
1987	Universiade	Zagreb, Yugoslavia	4th	400 m	51.74
1987	Pan American Games	Indianapolis, United States	5th	400 m	51.93
1987	World Championships	Rome, Italy	15th (sf)	400 m	52.24
1987	World Championships	Rome, Italy	11th (h)	4 × 400 m relay	3:30.91
1988	Ibero-American Championships	Mexico City, Mexico	3rd	200 m	23.35 (+0.0 m/s) A
1988	Ibero-American Championships	Mexico City, Mexico	2nd	400m	51.74 A
1988	Ibero-American Championships	Mexico City, Mexico	1st	4 × 400 m relay	3:29:22 A
1988	Olympic Games	Seoul, South Korea	29th (qf)	200 m	23.67
1988	Olympic Games	Seoul, South Korea	7th (qf)	400 m	51.32
1988	Olympic Games	Seoul, South Korea	11th (h)	4 × 400 m relay	3:36.81
1989	World Indoor Championships	Budapest, Hungary	5th	200 m	23.83
1990	Ibero-American Championships	Manaus, Brazil	1st	400 m	51.51
1990	Ibero-American Championships	Manaus, Brazil	1st	4 × 400 m relay	3:32.8
1991	South American Championships	Manaus, Brazil	1st	400 m	51.56
1991	South American Championships	Manaus, Brazil	1st	800 m	2:00.45
1991	South American Championships	Manaus, Brazil	1st	4 × 400 m relay	3:32.59
1991	World Championships	Tokyo, Japan	14th (sf)	800 m	2:01.53
1992	Ibero-American Championships	Seville, Spain	2nd	800 m	2:02.45
1993	South American Championships	Lima, Peru	1st	400 m	52.67
1993	South American Championships	Lima, Peru	1st	800 m	2:04.2
1993	South American Championships	Lima, Peru	1st	4 × 400 m relay	3:36.49
1993	World Championships	Stuttgart, Germany	14th (sf)	800 m	2:01.01
1994	Ibero-American Championships	Mar del Plata, Argentina	4th	400 m	55.44
1994	Ibero-American Championships	Mar del Plata, Argentina	2nd	4 × 400 m relay	3:38.61
1995	Pan American Games	Mar del Plata, Argentina	6th	400 m	53.10
1996	Ibero-American Championships	Medellín, Colombia	3rd	400 m	51.36
1996	Ibero-American Championships	Medellín, Colombia	3rd	4 × 100 m relay	44.59
1996	Ibero-American Championships	Medellín, Colombia	2nd	4 × 400 m relay	3:34.34
1996	Olympic Games	Atlanta, United States	22nd (qf)	400 m	51.98
1997	South American Championships	Mar del Plata, Argentina	2nd	400 m	53.49
1997	South American Championships	Mar del Plata, Argentina	2nd	4 × 100 m relay	45.21
1997	South American Championships	Mar del Plata, Argentina	2nd	4 × 400 m relay	3:38.18
1997	World Championships	Athens, Greece	30th (h)	400 m	53.95
1998	Ibero-American Championships	Lisbon, Portugal	4th	400 m	52.62
2001	South American Championships	Manaus, Brazil	1st	4 × 400 m relay	3:32.43
