= Natalie Kaaiawahia =

American shotputter

Personal information
- Full name: Natalie L. Kaaiawahia
- Nationality: United States

Sport
- Sport: Track and Field
- Event(s): shot put, discus
Medal record
Women's Track and Field
Representing United States
Pan American Junior Athletics Championships
Gold medal – first place	1982 Barquisimeto	Shot put
Bronze medal – third place	1982 Barquisimeto	Discus

Natalie L. Kaaiawahia is a retired American track and field athlete, known for her exceptional ability in throwing events while in high school.

In 1981 Kaaiawahia set the National high school record in the shot put first at 51' 8½" as a sophomore at Fullerton Union High School in Fullerton, California. But that throw only turned out to be the tenth best competition in her high school career. By her senior year in 1983, she had advanced the record to 53' 7¾" which stood as the record for 20 years, until it was surpassed by Michelle Carter.

Kaaiawahia won an unprecedented four championships in a row at the CIF California State Meet 1980-1983. She also added two championships in the Discus. Her best discus throw is still the second best in Orange County history.

The 6 foot tall athlete was discovered playing volleyball as a 14-year-old freshman and convinced to throw shot put by coach Hugo DeGroot.

After high school, she continue to throw at Arizona State University to work with one of the best programs in the country at that point in time. She achieved All American status in both events as a freshman in 1984. ASU alumni Ria Stalman and Leslie Deniz went on to take gold and silver in the discus at the 1984 Olympics. Still barely 18, Kaaiawahia made it to the Olympic Trials at the Los Angeles Memorial Coliseum just 30 miles (50 km) from Fullerton. Her final throw was estimated to be about 56 feet (over 17 meters), which would have been enough to qualify for the Olympics, but the throw was ruled a foul. The third slot went to another Southern California star Ramona Pagel with a 16.96 m (55 ft 7 1/2 in). Kaaiawahia's best was 16.79 m (55 ft 1 in) in fifth place.

After that, Kaaiawahia's interest in throwing waned. She dropped out of Arizona State, transferring to Fullerton College and Allan Hancock College studying Law Enforcement. Her recreational pursuits turned to playing recreational softball leagues. While she claimed she might come back to throwing after taking time off, she watched her competition, Pagel, coached by her husband, Fullerton High School alum Kent Pagel, increase the American record to 20.18 m (66 ft 2 1/4 in), a record that would last for 25 years until it too was beaten by Carter.

She was included in the Faces in the Crowd of the April 27, 1981 edition of Sports Illustrated after the first time she set the high school record.
