= Oswaldo Zea =

Venezuelan hurdler (born 1963)

Personal information
- Nickname: Ozzie
- Born: 25 April 1963 (age 63) Caracas, Republic of Venezuela
- Height: 1.79 m (5 ft 10 in)
- Weight: 65 kg (143 lb)

Sport
- Sport: Track and field
- Event: 400 metres hurdles

Oswaldo "Ozzie" Zea (born 25 April 1963) is a Venezuelan hurdler. He competed in the men's 400 metres hurdles at the 1984 Summer Olympics.

His personal bests in the event is 50.4 seconds set in 1988.

He is the founder of the athletics meeting Copa Zea held in Caracas.

== International competitions ==
Year	Competition	Venue	Position	Event	Notes
Representing Venezuela
1978	South American Youth Championships	Montevideo, Uruguay	6th (h)	400 m	52.66
1978	South American Youth Championships	Montevideo, Uruguay	3rd	4 × 400 m relay	3:30.1
1979	South American Youth Championships	Cochabamba, Bolivia	6th	200 m	23.1
1979	South American Youth Championships	Cochabamba, Bolivia	3rd	400 m	50.6
1979	South American Youth Championships	Cochabamba, Bolivia	3rd	4 × 100 m relay	44.4
1979	South American Youth Championships	Cochabamba, Bolivia	2nd	4 × 400 m relay	3:28.6
1979	South American Championships	Bucaramanga, Colombia	1st	4 × 400 m relay	3:09.8
1980	Central American and Caribbean; Junior Championships (U20)	Nassau, Bahamas	3rd	400 m	48.8
1980	Pan American Junior Championships	Sudbury, Canada	–	400 m	DQ
1980	Pan American Junior Championships	Sudbury, Canada	3rd	4 × 400 m relay	3:16.59
1981	South American Junior Championships	Rio de Janeiro, Brazil	2nd	400 m	48.1
1981	South American Junior Championships	Rio de Janeiro, Brazil	2nd	4 × 400 m relay	3:14.6
1981	Bolivarian Games	Barquisimeto, Venezuela	1st	4 × 400 m relay	3:08.50
1982	Pan American Junior Championships	Barquisimeto, Venezuela	3rd	400 m	48.23
1982	Pan American Junior Championships	Barquisimeto, Venezuela	3rd	4 × 400 m relay	3:20.20
1983	Pan American Games	Caracas, Venezuela	5th	400 m hurdles	50.85
1984	Olympic Games	Los Angeles, United States	34th (h)	400 m hurdles	51.44
1986	Central American and Caribbean Games	Santiago, Dominican Republic	–	400 m hurdles	DNF
