= 1977 South American Youth Championships in Athletics =

IV South American Youth Championships in Athletics
- Dates: July 22–24
- Host city: Rio de Janeiro, Brazil
- Level: Youth
- Events: 33
- Participation: about 202 athletes from 8 nations

The 4th South American Youth Championships in Athletics were held in Rio de Janeiro, Brazil from July 22–24, 1977.

== Medal summary ==
Medal winners are published for boys and girls. Complete results can be found on the "World Junior Athletics History" website.

=== Men ===
Event	Gold		Silver		Bronze	
100 metres (wind: +1.0 m/s)	Sérgio Modroka (BRA)	11.23	Alfredo Sancho (CHI)	11.29	Nelson Mann (VEN)	11.31
200 metres	Jesús Machuca (VEN)	22.6	Héctor Fernández (CHI)	22.8	Reinaldo Rey (VEN)	23.0
400 metres	Raúl Martínez (VEN)	50.66	José Obispo (VEN)	50.76	Daniel Orlando (ARG)	51.20
800 metres	Humberto Oliveira (BRA)	1:57.9	Fernando Gil (BRA)	1:58.0	José Obispo (VEN)	1:58.2
1500 metres	Paulo Damasceno (BRA)	4:01.2	Carlos Alves (BRA)	4:01.8	Alfredo Decalles (VEN)	4:02.1
1500 metres steeplechase	Carlos Alves (BRA)	4:20.9	Alejandro Duniec (ARG)	4:24.9	Osvaldo Lezcano (PAR)	4:25.7
110 metres hurdles	Tomás de Alencar (BRA)	15.04	Sidney dos Santos (BRA)	15.25	Sergio Faivovich (CHI)	15.32
300 metres hurdles	Sidney dos Santos (BRA)	40.0	Ricardo Pedrotti (ARG)	40.6	Javier Olivar (URU)	40.7
High jump	Carlos Gambetta (ARG)	1.92	Juan Gallardo (CHI)	1.87	Jorge Archanjo (BRA)	1.84
Pole vault	Cristián Barriu (CHI)	3.75	Marcelo Cibié (CHI)	3.70	Jorge Drika (VEN)	3.60
Long jump	Carlos Gambetta (ARG)	6.77	Paulo Silva (BRA)	6.71	João Batista Dias (BRA)	6.61
Triple jump	Daniel Bonazola (ARG)	14.05	Oscar Diesel (PAR)	13.31	Marcelo Moraes (BRA)	13.04
Shot put	João Lima (BRA)	15.77	Luis Spahn (ARG)	14.84	Roberto Malatesta (ARG)	14.46
Discus throw	Miro Ronac (PER)	49.40	Miguel Rojas (VEN)	45.88	João Paulo Cunha (BRA)	44.08
Hammer throw	Pedro Rivail Atílio (BRA)	51.06	Rogério Karpinski (BRA)	50.94	Luis Spahn (ARG)	50.20
Javelin throw	Alejandro Gordillo (ARG)	55.74	André Vianna (BRA)	52.42	Raimundo Molaya (VEN)	51.92
Hexathlon	Daniel Pollo (ARG)	3720	Jorge García (ARG)	3700	Adolfo Marín (PAR)	3609
4 × 100 metres relay	Venezuela; Reinaldo Key; Nelson Mann; Ángel Román; Jesús Machuca	43.0	Chile; Alfredo Sancho; Luis Lagos; Roberto; Héctor Fernández	43.4	Brazil; Marcos Okamoto; Sérgio Modroka; Etore; Albira	43.5
4 × 400 metres relay	Venezuela; José Obispo; Pedro Martínez; Antonio Rivas; Raúl Martínez	3:25.4	Brazil; Sidney dos Santos; Tomás de Alencar; Marcio Gonzaga; Carlos Santos	3:26.8	Chile; Guillermo García; Héctor Fernández; Sergio Cárdenas; Luis Lagos	3:29.2

=== Women ===
Event	Gold		Silver		Bronze	
100 metres	Carla Herencia (CHI)	12.21	Beatriz Capotosto (ARG)	12.29	Adriana Pero (ARG)	12.33
200 metres	Sueli Machado (BRA)	24.95	Carla Herencia (CHI)	25.39	Simone Santos (BRA)	25.42
400 metres	Sueli Machado (BRA)	55.55	Marcela López Espinosa (ARG)	55.89	Cecilia Rodríguez (CHI)	58.67
800 metres	Marcela López Espinosa (ARG)	2:14.1	Sandra Ferreira (BRA)	2:16.2	Mónica Regonessi (CHI)	2:16.2
80 metres hurdles	Juraciara da Silva (BRA)	12.38	Priscilla Sautchuck (BRA)	12.68	Claudia Benavente (CHI)	12.85
High jump	Evelyn Jabiles (PER)	1.70	Linda Spenst (BOL)	1.68	Lucilene Lonardoni (BRA)	1.66
Long jump	Evelyn Jabiles (PER)	5.44	Silvia Barchetta (ARG)	5.36	Marisa Batista (BRA)	5.33
Shot put	Patricia Guerrero (PER)	12.29	Cristina Madoz (ARG)	10.96	Sandra Vázquez (CHI)	10.72
Discus throw	Alejandra Bevacqua (ARG)	37.02	Graciela Scaglia (ARG)	35.40	Márcia Barbosa (BRA)	34.92
Javelin throw	Patricia Guerrero (PER)	44.06	Gladys Aguayo (CHI)	41.82	Alejandra Valenzuela (CHI)	36.74
Pentathlon	Lucilene Lonardoni (BRA)	3500	Ana Maria de Oliveira (BRA)	3346	Adriana Freiberg (ARG)	3124
4 × 100 metres relay	Brazil; Lindalva Ferreira; Simone Santos; Maria do Carmo; Sueli Machado	47.66	Chile; Claudia Benavente; Pía Ábalos; María Labarca; Carla Herencia	49.02	Argentina; Adriana Pero; Gabriela Kiczka; Silvia Barchetta; Beatriz Capotosto	49.06
4 × 400 metres relay	Brazil; Antonia Mainart; Iłża Telles; Sandra Ferreira; Sueli Machado	3:50.6	Argentina; Alejandra Vives; Viviana Brossard; Silvia Augsburger; Marcela López	3:52.1	Chile; María Labarca; Pía Ábalos; Cecilia Rodríguez; Mónica Regonesi	3:57.7

== Medal table (unofficial) ==
* Host nation (Brazil)

Rank	Nation	Gold	Silver	Bronze	Total
1	Brazil (BRA)*	14	10	9	33
2	Argentina (ARG)	7	10	6	23
3	Peru (PER)	5	0	0	5
4	Venezuela (VEN)	4	2	6	12
5	Chile (CHI)	2	8	8	18
6	Paraguay (PAR)	0	1	2	3
7	Bolivia (BOL)	0	1	0	1
8	Uruguay (URU)	0	0	1	1
Totals (8 entries)		32	32	32	96

== Participation (unofficial) ==
Detailed result lists can be found on the "World Junior Athletics History" website. An unofficial count yields the number of about 202 athletes from about 8 countries:

- Argentina (39)
- Bolivia (4)
- Brazil (53)
- Chile (36)
- Paraguay (17)
- (Peru) Perú (20)
- Venezuela (20)
