= Graciela Acosta =

Uruguayan athlete (born 1963)

Personal information
- Full name: Graciela Acosta Bastos
- Born: 16 January 1963 (age 63)

Sport
- Sport: Athletics
- Events: Long jump, triple jump
- Club: USC Mainz

Graciela Acosta Bastos (born 16 January 1963) is a retired Uruguayan athlete who specialised in the long jump for most of her career. She represented her country in the triple jump at the 1993 World Championships in Stuttgart without qualifying for the final.

== International competitions ==
Year	Competition	Venue	Position	Event	Notes
Representing Uruguay
1977	South American Championships	Montevideo, Uruguay	7th	High jump	1.45 m
1978	South American Youth Championships	Montevideo, Uruguay	3rd	Long jump	5.38 m
1981	South American Junior Championships	Rio de Janeiro, Brazil	3rd	Long jump	5.74 m
1981	South American Championships	La Paz, Bolivia	3rd	Long jump	5.97 m
1982	Southern Cross Games	Santa Fe, Argentina	2nd	Long jump	5.83 m
1983	South American Championships	Santa Fe, Argentina	2nd	4 × 100 m relay	47.7 s
1983	South American Championships	Santa Fe, Argentina	4th	Long jump	5.61 m
1985	South American Championships	Santiago, Chile	3rd	Long jump	5.81 m
1986	Ibero-American Championships	Havana, Cuba	4th	4 × 100 m relay	47.58 s
1986	Ibero-American Championships	Havana, Cuba	3rd	Long jump	5.93 m
1986	South American Games	Santiago, Chile	1st	Long jump	5.78 m
1993	South American Championships	Lima, Peru	5th	Long jump	5.79 m (w)
1993	South American Championships	Lima, Peru	5th	Triple jump	12.22 m (w)
1993	World Championships	Stuttgart, Germany	24th (q)	Triple jump	11.80 m

== Personal bests ==
Outdoor

- Long jump – 5.99 (Betzdorf 1990)
- Triple jump – 12.55 (Montevideo 1993)
