= Douglas Fernández =

Venezuelan decathlete

Personal information
- Born: November 22, 1959 (age 66)

Sport
- Country: Venezuela
- Sport: Men's Athletics

Achievements and titles
- Olympic finals: 1984 Summer Olympics
Medal record
Men's Athletics
Representing Venezuela
Pan American Games
Silver medal – second place	1983 Caracas	Decathlon
Bolivarian Games
Bronze medal – third place	1981 Barquisimeto	Discus throw
Bronze medal – third place	1981 Barquisimeto	Javelin throw

Douglas ("Doug") Fernández (born November 22, 1959) is a retired male decathlete from Venezuela. His major achievement was winning the silver medal at the 1983 Pan American Games in Caracas. He represented his native country at the 1984 Summer Olympics in Los Angeles, California, finishing in 18th place.

== Achievements ==
Year	Competition	Venue	Position	Event	Notes
Representing Venezuela
1981	Bolivarian Games	Barquisimeto, Venezuela	3rd	Discus	46.32 m
1981	Bolivarian Games	Barquisimeto, Venezuela	3rd	Javelin	68.28 m
