= Suzete Montalvão =

Brazilian sprinter

Personal information
- Full name: Suzete Montalvão Fraiha
- Born: Suzete Garcia Montalvão; 27 February 1965 (age 60) Belém, Brazil
- Height: 1.58 m (5 ft 2 in)
- Weight: 51 kg (112 lb)

Sport
- Sport: Sprinting
- Event: 4 × 400 metres relay

Suzete Montalvão Fraiha (born 27 February 1965) is a Brazilian sprinter. She competed in the women's 4 × 400 metres relay at the 1988 Summer Olympics.
