= Phillip Riley =

American football player (born 1972)

No. 89
- Position: Wide receiver

Personal information
- Born: September 24, 1972 (age 54); Orlando, Florida, U.S.
- Listed height: 5 ft 11 in (1.80 m)
- Listed weight: 189 lb (86 kg)

Career information
- High school: Jones (Orlando)
- College: Florida State
- NFL draft: 1996: 6th round, 199th overall pick

Career history
- Philadelphia Eagles (1996)*; New York Jets (1996); Buffalo Bills (1996)*; Chicago Bears (1996); Miami Dolphins (1997)*
- * Offseason or practice squad member only

Awards and highlights
- National champion (1993)

Career NFL statistics
- Games played: 1
- Stats at Pro Football Reference
- Stats at ArenaFan.com

Phillip Shayon Riley (born September 24, 1972) is an American former professional football player who was a wide receiver for one game with the New York Jets in 1996. He played college football for the Florida State Seminoles and was selected by the Philadelphia Eagles in the sixth round of the 1996 NFL draft with the 179th overall pick.

Running for the Seminoles track and field team, he was the 1995 NCAA Indoor Champion for 55 meter hurdles.
