= 1982 Pan American Junior Athletics Championships =

II Pan American Junior Athletics Championships
- Dates: July 30-August 1
- Host city: Barquisimeto, Venezuela
- Level: Junior
- Events: 38
- Participation: about 211 athletes from 12 nations

The 2nd Pan American Junior Athletics Championships were held in Barquisimeto, Venezuela, on July 30-August 1, 1982.

== Participation (unofficial) ==
Detailed result lists can be found on the "World Junior Athletics History" website. An unofficial count yields the number of about 211 athletes from about 12 countries: Antigua and Barbuda (1), Argentina (8), Bermuda (1), Brazil (8), Canada (55), Chile (5), Colombia (16), Cuba (16), Dominican Republic (1), Puerto Rico (6), United States (63), Venezuela (31).

== Medal summary ==
Medal winners are published. Complete results can be found on the "World Junior Athletics History" website.

=== Men ===
Event	Gold		Silver		Bronze	
100 metres	Robson da Silva (BRA)	10.34w	John Parker (USA)	10.42w	Luis Morales (USA)	10.43w
200 metres	Clinton Davis (USA)	20.39 WYB	John Parker (USA)	20.78	Courtney Brown (CAN)	20.93
400 metres	David Timmons (USA)	46.89	Chris Bernard (CAN)	48.21	Oswaldo Zea (VEN)	48.23
800 metres	John Marshall (USA)	1:50.12	Pablo Squella (CHI)	1:50.34	John Borgese (USA)	1:52.16
1500 metres	Dave Reid (CAN)	3:49.5	Marc Oleson (CAN)	3:50.3	Geraldo de Assis (BRA)	3:51.9
5000 metres	Marc Oleson (CAN)	14:22.0	Mauricio Cadavid (COL)	14:25.7	Tom Ansberry (USA)	14:30.13
2000 metres steeplechase	Alain Boucher (CAN)	5:48.5	Mark Smith (USA)	5:49.1	Carey Nelson (CAN)	5:55.8
110 metres hurdles	Ángel Bueno (CUB)	14.00	Jeff Powell (USA)	14.05	Elvis Cedeño (VEN)	14.62
400 metres hurdles	Leander McKenzie (USA)	51.41	Pablo Squella (CHI)	51.70	John Thomas (USA)	52.64
4 × 100 metres relay	United States; Luis Morales; Jeff Jackson; Clinton Davis; John Parker	39.42	Canada; Robert Dalton; George Wright; Courtney Brown; Atlee Mahorn	40.24	Venezuela; Elvis Cedeño; Freddy Pérez; Antonio Gómez; Víctor Carrasquel	41.01
4 × 400 metres relay	United States; Jeff Jackson; Clinton Davis; Calvin Brooks; David Timmons	3:07.70	Canada; Chris Bernard; Robert Dalton; Warren Lee; John Hastings	3:16.70	Venezuela; Mervin Solarte; Mario Rondon; Luis García; Oswaldo Zea	3:20.20
10,000 metres track walk	Héctor Moreno (COL)	42:34.3	Marcos Hernández (COL)	45:34.5	Omar Guerrero (VEN)	47:39.2
High jump	Alain Metellus (CAN)	2.20	Natty Crooks (CAN)	2.15	Nathaniel Braxton (USA); Nick Saunders (BER)	2.10
Pole vault	Kasey Lewis (USA)	4.75	Rudy Buntic (CAN)	4.75	Chet Clotfelder (USA)	4.75
Long jump	Vance Johnson (USA)	7.93	Ed Tave (USA)	7.86	André Metivier (CAN)	7.53
Triple jump	Oscar Harris (USA)	16.00	Lázaro Balcindes (CUB)	15.98	Lester Benjamin (ATG)	15.96
Shot put	John Frazier (USA)	17.11	Arnold Campbell (USA)	16.43	Mike Spiritoso (CAN)	15.92
Discus throw	Tim Brandt (USA)	52.52	Martin Davenport (USA)	50.22	Vladimir Isaac (CUB)	46.42
Hammer throw	Francisco Soria (CUB)	60.12	David Castrillón (COL)	53.38	Les Szoke (CAN)	51.10
Javelin throw	Scott Moon (USA)	67.20	Wilson Pachalski (BRA)	66.24	Todd Murdock (USA)	60.08
Decathlon	Rob Muzzio (USA)	6902	Jay Thorson (USA)	6753	Álvaro Mena (COL)	6267

=== Women ===
Event	Gold		Silver		Bronze	
100 metres	Donna Dennis (USA)	11.70	Denise Phipps (CAN)	11.86	Janet Davis (USA)	11.87
200 metres	Donna Dennis (USA)	23.83	Tonya Stevens (USA)	23.94	Jillian Richardson (CAN)	24.08
400 metres	Jillian Richardson (CAN)	52.74	Maxine Underwood (USA)	53.00	Gervaise McGraw (USA)	53.42
800 metres	Patricia Wellmann (CAN)	2:06.10	Trescia Palmer (USA)	2:06.84	Camille Catto (CAN)	2:07.16
1500 metres	Polly Plumer (USA)	4:23.78	Michelle Rowen (USA)	4:25.24	Jill Purola (CAN)	4:25.99
3000 metres	Vickie Cook (USA)	9:46.65	Carol Howe (CAN)	9:50.30	Katie Ishmael (USA)	9:51.38
100 metres hurdles	Arnita Epps (USA)	13.95	Connie Polman-Tuin (CAN)	14.22	Kelly Graham (USA)	14.27
400 metres hurdles	Gayle Kellon (USA)	58.18	Isabelle Boutet (CAN)	59.84	Gwen Wall (CAN)	60.25
4 × 100 metres relay	United States; Janet Davis; Tonya Stevens ? Donna Dennis	44.07	Canada; Sharon Clarke; Angela Phipps; Janice Heard; Donna Pajor	46.02	Venezuela; Arelis Cohen; Siudulia Caldera; Florencia Chilberry; Belkis Subero	48.00
4 × 400 metres relay	United States; Gayle Kellon; Nedra Rogers; Gervaise McCraw; Maxine Underwood	3:34.68	Canada; Cheryl Thibedeau; Gwen Wall; Camille Cato; Jillian Richardson	3:43.12	Venezuela; Reina Rojas; Doralis Chacin; Florencia Chilberry; Belkis Subero	4:03.64
3000 metres Track Walk	Joan Bender (CAN)	14:21.3	Alison Baker (CAN)	14:47.7	Jamie Melfi (USA)	15:23.9
High jump	Mary Moore (USA)	1.87	Carol Ann Lesley (CAN)	1.81	Shari Collins (USA)	1.78
Long jump	Sharon Clarke (CAN)	6.06	Deborah Larsen (USA)	5.95	Bárbara Martín (CUB)	5.90
Shot put	Natalie Kaaiawahia (USA)	15.48	Regina Cavanaugh (USA)	14.80	Luz Bohórquez (VEN)	14.32
Discus throw	Maritza Martén (CUB)	55.20	Hilda Ramos (CUB)	50.90	Natalie Kaaiawahia (USA)	47.08
Javelin throw	Iris de Grasse (CUB)	53.98	Marieta Riera (VEN)	49.46	Martha Hart (CAN)	49.42
Heptathlon	Connie Polman-Tuin (CAN)	5496	Annie Potvin (CAN)	5258	Sharon Hatfield (USA)	5232

== Medal table (unofficial) ==
* Host nation (Venezuela)

Rank	Nation	Gold	Silver	Bronze	Total
1	United States	23	14	15	52
2	Canada	9	15	10	34
3	Cuba	4	2	2	8
4	Colombia	1	3	1	5
5	Brazil	1	1	1	3
6	Chile	0	2	0	2
7	Venezuela*	0	1	8	9
8	Antigua and Barbuda	0	0	1	1
8	Bermuda	0	0	1	1
Totals (9 entries)		38	38	39	115
