= João Batista da Silva (athlete) =

Brazilian sprinter

Personal information
- Born: August 22, 1963 (age 62) João Pessoa, Paraíba
- Height: 1.78 m (5 ft 10 in)
- Weight: 74 kg (163 lb)

Sport
- Club: AAUGF
Medal record
Men's Athletics
Representing Brazil
World Indoor Championships
Bronze medal – third place	1985 Paris	200 m
Pan American Games
Bronze medal – third place	1983 Caracas	4 × 100 m relay

João Batista Eugênio da Silva (born August 22, 1963 in João Pessoa, Paraíba) is a Brazilian retired sprinter who competed in 200 metres and 400 metres.

== Career ==
João Silva reached at 200 m final, finished 4th (20.30 s) at the 1984 Summer Olympics, in Los Angeles, United States.

He won the medal bronze at 200 m (21.19 s) at the 1985 IAAF World Indoor Games in Paris, France.
