= 1980 Pan American Junior Athletics Championships =

I Pan American Junior Athletics Championships
- Dates: August 29–31
- Host city: Sudbury, Canada
- Level: Junior
- Events: 38
- Participation: about 217 athletes from 17 nations

The 1st Pan American Junior Athletics Championships were held in Sudbury, Ontario, on August 29–31, 1980.

== Participation (unofficial) ==
Detailed result lists can be found on the "World Junior Athletics History" website. An unofficial count yields the number of about 217 athletes from about 17 countries: Argentina (3), Bahamas (7), Barbados (2), Bermuda (4), Brazil (15), Canada (58), Chile (4), Dominican Republic (12), Guatemala (6), Guyana (2), Jamaica (7), Mexico (8), Panama (1), Suriname (2), Trinidad and Tobago (6), United States (67), Venezuela (13).

== Medal summary ==
Medal winners are published. Complete results can be found on the "World Junior Athletics History" website.

=== Men ===
Event	Gold		Silver		Bronze	
100 metres	Carl Lewis (USA)	10.43	Calvin Smith (USA)	10.51	Tony Sharpe (CAN)	10.56
200 metres	Carl Lewis (USA)	20.72w	Calvin Smith (USA)	20.94w	Héctor Daley (PAN)	20.98w
400 metres	Héctor Daley (PAN)	46.12	Bill Hartson (USA)	47.12	Tim Bethune (CAN)	47.22
800 metres	Joaquim Cruz (BRA)	1:47.85	John Marshall (USA)	1:48.44	Doug Wournell (CAN)	1:49.34
1500 metres	Joaquim Cruz (BRA)	3:49.96	Doug Wournell (CAN)	3:50.93	Vince Draddy (USA)	3:51.39
5000 metres	Arturo Barrios (MEX)	14:53.30	John Zishka (USA)	14:53.78	Dennis Stark (CAN)	15:02.51
2000 metres steeplechase	Rich Garcia (USA)	5:43.2	Rafael Colmenares (VEN)	5:44.6	Arturo Barrios (MEX)	5:46.0
110 metres hurdles	Rodney Wilson (USA)	13.71	Cletus Clark (USA)	14.13	Mark McKoy (CAN)	14.42
400 metres hurdles	Elías de Fonseca (BRA)	50.70	Don Ward (USA)	52.14	Eric Spence (CAN)	53.37
4 × 100 metres relay	United States; Carl Lewis; Ken Robinson; Calvin Smith; Raymond Threatt	39.61	Jamaica; Al Lawrence; Earle Laing; Richard Lee; Leroy Reid	40.95	Canada; Michael Dwyer; Ben Johnson; Tony Sharpe; Chris Brandy	41.11
4 × 400 metres relay	United States; Bill Hartson; Jeffrey White; Zeke Jefferson; Jeff Hill	3:08.60	Canada; Clement Grant; Tim Bethune; Tom Hinds; Eric Spence	3:13.17	Venezuela; Douglas Murillo; Oswaldo Zea; Aaron Phillips; Luis Lizardi	3:16.59
10,000 metres track walk	Marcelino Colín (MEX)	43:32.20	Guillaume Leblanc (CAN)	43:39.45	François Lapointe (CAN)	46:55.88
High jump	Lee Balkin (USA)	2.21	Noel McIntyre (CAN)	2.10	Ron Jones (USA); Delroy Poyser (JAM)	2.05
Pole vault	Dave Woolley (CAN)	4.60	Marcelo Cibié (CHI)	4.45	Bob Ferguson (CAN)	4.30
Long jump	Larry Clemons (USA)	7.52	Jake Howard (USA)	7.12	Michel Boutet (CAN)	7.00
Triple jump	Simon Ware (USA)	15.28	Dwayne Rudd (USA)	15.18	Lyndon Sands (BAH)	15.05
Shot put	Scott Jennings (USA)	17.05	Johnny Neilsen (CAN)	16.99	John Brenner (USA)	16.57
Discus throw	Lance Deal (USA)	56.18	Alan Baginski (USA)	51.14	Kevin Tait (CAN)	45.60
Hammer throw	Pedro Rivail Atílio (BRA)	57.56	Alan Baginski (USA)	53.96	Rogério Karpinski (BRA)	50.28
Javelin throw	Mike Barnett (USA)	73.04	John Udvari (CAN)	68.00	Juan de la Garza (MEX)	66.96
Decathlon	Steve Erickson (USA)	6639	Ronaldo Alcaraz (BRA)	6443	Keith Stewart (USA)	6252

=== Women ===
Event	Gold		Silver		Bronze	
100 metres	Angela Bailey (CAN)	11.55	Michele Glover (USA)	11.61	Sharon Ware (USA)	11.82
200 metres	Angela Bailey (CAN)	23.44w	Michele Glover (USA)	23.56w	Diane Jefferson (USA)	24.22w
400 metres	Charmaine Crooks (CAN)	53.61	Faye Paige (USA)	53.97	Cathy Rattray (JAM)	54.01
800 metres	Joetta Clark (USA)	2:05.65	Kim Gallagher (USA)	2:06.52	Nancy Rettie (CAN)	2:07.88
1500 metres	Nancy Rettie (CAN)	4:24.21	Mónica Regonessi (CHI)	4:25.79	Birgit Otto (CAN)	4:31.32
3000 metres	Vickie Cook (USA)	9:24.8	Silvia Ruegger (CAN)	9:25.6	Kate Wiley (CAN)	9:27.0
100 metres hurdles	Sherifa Sanders (USA)	14.44	Carol Lewis (USA)	14.62	Karen Nelson (CAN)	14.93
400 metres hurdles	Felicia Candelario (DOM)	60.13	Peggy Sweeney (CAN)	60.85	Tracy Nelson (USA)	60.96
4 × 100 metres relay	United States; Michele Glover; Paula Hines; Marcia Martin; Maxine Underwood	44.61	Dominican Republic; María Báez; Teresa Almanzar; Iris Sanders; Felicia Candelario	48.63	Only two finishing teams	
4 × 400 metres relay	United States; Faye Paige; Robin Jackson; Marcia Martin; Maxine Underwood	3:38.95	Canada; Tanya Brothers; Renée Belanger; Peggy Sweeney; Christine McKay	3:44.98	Dominican Republic; Iris Sanders; Marcelina Reinoso; María Báez; Felicia Candelario	4:12.95
3000 metres Track Walk	Ann Peel (CAN)	14:39.47	Hélène Daviau (CAN)	15:07.09	Susan Ruiz (USA)	15:41.29
High jump	Liliana Arigoni (ARG)	1.82	Linda McCurdy (CAN)	1.76	Sue Lind (USA)	1.73
Long jump	Jackie Joyner (USA)	6.18	Karen Nelson (CAN)	6.04	Yvonne Coelho (CAN)	5.86
Shot put	Susie Ray (USA)	13.82	Cindy Crapper (CAN)	13.46	Cindy Johnson (USA)	13.02
Discus throw	Leslie Deniz (USA)	49.64	Carol Cady (USA)	49.04	Liz Polyak (CAN)	44.40
Javelin throw	Lynda Hughes (USA)	51.68	Martha Hart (CAN)	51.62	Sonya Smith (BER)	49.50
Heptathlon	Theresa Lenardon (CAN)	5297	Sharon Hatfield (USA)	5143	Connie Polman-Tuin (CAN)	4879

== Medal table (unofficial) ==
* Host nation (Canada)

Rank	Nation	Gold	Silver	Bronze	Total
1	United States	22	18	10	50
2	Canada*	7	14	18	39
3	Brazil	4	1	1	6
4	Mexico	2	0	2	4
5	Dominican Republic	1	1	1	3
6	Panama	1	0	1	2
7	Argentina	1	0	0	1
8	Chile	0	2	0	2
9	Jamaica	0	1	2	3
10	Venezuela	0	1	1	2
11	Bahamas	0	0	1	1
11	Bermuda	0	0	1	1
Totals (12 entries)		38	38	38	114
