= Athletics at the 1981 Central African Games =

Aspect of the 1981 Central African Games

Athletics at the 2nd Central African Games
- Dates: 20 August – 30 September
- Host city: Luanda, Angola
- Events: 34

At the 1981 Central African Games, the athletics events were held in Luanda, Angola from 20 August – 30 September.

A total of 34 track and field events were contested (20 for men and 14 for women). Compared to the previous edition, a men's hammer throw event and the women's 3000 metres and 100 metres hurdles were added to the programme. Cameroon repeated as the medal leader in athletics, winning twelve events and a total of 25 medals. Gabon had the second highest number of gold medals (seven) while the Republic of the Congo has the second highest tally with 22 medals. The host Angola won 19 medals. Nine of the ten competing nations reached the medal table.

Seven athletes won multiple individual titles at the games. On the men's side, Théophile Nkounkou won a short sprints double for Congo, Burundi's Evariste Haritwinshi scored a middle-distance double, and Bernardo Manuel took a long-distance double for the host nation. Among the women, Cameroon's Ruth Enang Mesode did a sprint double, Marcianne Mukamurenzi of Rwanda won the 1500 metres and 3000 metres titles, Cameroonian heptathlete Cécile Ngambi won the high jump and 100 metres hurdles, and her teammate Agnès Tchuinté won both the discus throw and javelin throw.

Six individuals successfully retained their titles from the 1976 edition: Théophile Nkounkou (men's 100 m), Paul Ngadjadoum (men's high jump), Jean-Emmanuel Vanlier (men's discus), Kémobé Djimassal (men's long jump), Cécile Ngambi (women's high jump) and Agnès Tchuinté (women's javelin). The standard of performances improved across the board, with games records being set in 24 of the 34 events contested – 19 of the games records set went unbeaten in the competition's history.

== Medal summary ==
=== Men ===
Event	Gold		Silver		Bronze	
100 metres	Théophile Nkounkou (CGO)	10.4	Antoine Ntsana (CGO)	10.4	Sulama Yansem (ZAI)	10.8
200 metres	Théophile Nkounkou (CGO)	20.9 GR	Emmanuel Bitanga (CMR)	21.1	Henri Ndinga (CGO)	21.5
400 metres	Emmanuel Bitanga (CMR)	46.3 GR	Jean-Didace Bémou (CGO)	47.4	Pierre Nyabenda (BDI)	48.4
800 metres	Evariste Haritwinshi (BDI)	1:51.0 GR	Ernest Batangiye (BDI)	1:51.4	Fernando Fonseca (ANG)	1:52.5
1500 metres	Evariste Haritwinshi (BDI)	3:54.1 GR	Ernest Batangiye (BDI)	3:54.9	Ghislain Obounghat (CGO)	3:56.1
5000 metres	Bernardo Manuel (ANG)	14:42.4 GR	Evariste Nbikora (BDI)	14:44.6	?. Niyonzima (BDI)	14:58.2
10,000 metres	Bernardo Manuel (ANG)	30:27.4 GR	?. Niyonzima (BDI)	30:46.1	?. Nbizi (BDI)	30:47.3
3000 m steeplechase	Emmanuel M'pioh (CGO)	9:20.3 GR	Liboire Barutwanayo (BDI)	9:23.5	Pedro Luciano (ANG)	9:29.8
110 m hurdles	Daniel Ololo (GAB)	14.8	Bernard Mabikana (CGO)	15.2	Jean-Pierre Abossolo (CMR)	15.2
400 m hurdles	Jean-Pierre Abossolo (CMR)	52.8	Gualberto Paquete (ANG)	53.3	Octavio da Conceição (ANG)	55.1
High jump	Paul Ngadjadoum (CHA)	2.10 m	Orlando Bonifacio (ANG)	2.05 m	Édouard Messan (GAB)	2.00 m
Pole vault	Noël Ongowou-Dosso (GAB)	4.20 m GR	Daniel Elebou (CGO)	3.80 m	Germain Gamouna (CGO)	3.50 m
Long jump	Kémobé Djimassal (CHA)	7.11 m	Antoine Kiakouama (CGO)	7.02 m	Kalengay Ntumba (ZAI)	6.80 m
Triple jump	Paul Bétel (CMR)	14.88 m	José Monteiro (ANG)	14.34 m	Kémobé Djimassal (CHA)	14.28 m
Shot put	Thomas Abong (CMR)	14.23 m	Claude Bessala (CMR)	13.72 m	François Ganongo (CGO)	13.42 m
Discus throw	Jean-Emmanuel Vanlier (CMR)	48.06 m	Casimir Molongo (CGO)	44.08 m	Abraham Vounsouma (CMR)	41.52 m
Hammer throw	António Réais (ANG)	49.16 m GR	Jorge Cruz (ANG)	46.50 m	Casimir Molongo (CGO)	33.62 m
Javelin throw	François Ganongo (CGO)	71.12 m GR	Jean Rusesemwa (BDI)	66.34 m	Isaie Sébugoré (RWA)	59.44 m
4 × 100 m relay	Congo (CGO)	40.5	Angola (ANG)	41.1	Cameroon (CMR)	41.8
4 × 400 m relay	Congo (CGO)	3:12.7 GR	Cameroon (CMR)	3:15.1	Angola (ANG)	3:16.5

=== Women ===
Event	Gold		Silver		Bronze	
100 metres	Ruth Enang Mesode (CMR)	11.5 GR	Albertine Batsoua (CGO)	12.3	Filomena Mauricio (ANG)	12.4
200 metres	Ruth Enang Mesode (CMR)	24.8 GR	Adèle Mengué (GAB)	24.9	Chantal Méyé (GAB)	25.4
400 metres	Adèle Mengué (GAB)	56.4 GR	Chantal Méyé (GAB)	56.7	Lucia Martins Souza (STP)	59.3
800 metres	Brigitte Ntsamé (GAB)	2:15.2 GR	Francisca Xavier (ANG)	2:16.8	?. Yéno (GAB)	2:17.4
1500 metres	Marcianne Mukamurenzi (RWA)	4:43.0 GR	Assumpta Achuo-Bei (CMR)	4:53.9	Rosa Neves (ANG)	4:56.5
3000 metres	Marcianne Mukamurenzi (RWA)	10:07.1 GR	Pauline Mpassy (CGO)	10:35.0	Clementine Yong (CMR)	10:38.8
100 m hurdles	Cécile Ngambi (CMR)	13.8 GR	Anne-Lise Montoulieu (GAB)	15.5	Françoise Mistoul (GAB)	15.7
High jump	Cécile Ngambi (CMR)	1.77 m GR	Fernande Agnentchoué (GAB)	1.72 m	Brigitte Revangué (GAB)	1.63 m
Long jump	Lydie Loueyit (GAB)	5.47 m	Christine Maring (CMR)	5.37 m	Faustina Assis (ANG)	5.08 m
Shot put	Odette Mistoul (GAB)	13.60 m GR	Carla Carvalho (ANG)	12.90 m	Julienne Kémayo-Ngassa (CMR)	12.68 m
Discus throw	Agnès Tchuinté (CMR)	39.28 m GR	Agathe Ngo Nack (CMR)	37.02 m	Maria Domingos (ANG)	33.34 m
Javelin throw	Agnès Tchuinté (CMR)	55.86 m GR	Técle Libata (CGO)	40.38 m	Véronique Kenfack (CMR)	39.46 m
4 × 100 m relay	Cameroon (CMR)	47.4 GR	Angola (ANG)	49.8	Congo (CGO)	50.0
4 × 400 m relay	Gabon (GAB)	3:56.1 GR	Congo (CGO)	4:00.1	Cameroon (CMR)	4:02.1

== Medal table ==
* Host nation (Angola)

Rank	Nation	Gold	Silver	Bronze	Total
1	Cameroon (CMR)	12	6	7	25
2	Gabon (GAB)	7	4	5	16
3	Republic of the Congo (CGO)	6	10	6	22
4	Angola (ANG)*	3	8	8	19
5	Burundi (BDI)	2	6	3	11
6	Chad (CHA)	2	0	1	3
6	Rwanda (RWA)	2	0	1	3
8	Democratic Republic of the Congo (ZAI)	0	0	2	2
9	São Tomé and Príncipe (STP)	0	0	1	1
Totals (9 entries)		34	34	34	102
