= Athletics at the 1976 Central African Games =

Athletics at the 1st Central African Games
- Dates: 30 June – 10 July
- Host city: Libreville, Gabon
- Venue: Stade Omar Bongo
- Events: 31

At the 1976 Central African Games, the athletics events were held at the Stade Omar Bongo in Libreville, Gabon from 30 June – 10 July.

A total of 31 track and field events were contested (19 for men and 12 for women). There were no long-distance running or hurdles races for women and triple jump was a men-only event. Cameroon comfortably topped the medal table with 28 medals and 13 gold medals. Republic of the Congo was a clear second, with six gold medals among a haul of 27. Chad and the host nation Gabon were the only other nations to reach double digits in the medal tally and win multiple gold medals. A total of seven of the eleven competing nations reached the medal table.

Three athletes won multiple individual titles. On the men's side, Denis Dakréo of Cameroon won both the 110 m and 400 m hurdles events, while on the women's side Gabon's Eulalie Mbourou scored a middle-distance double and Cameroon's Germaine Wonja won the shot put and discus throw events. Congolese Théophile Nkounkou and Chadian Boulot Alladoum won the individual and relay events over men's 100 metres and 400 metres, respectively.

Both Dakréo's hurdles times went unbeaten over the history of the games. Among the other unbeaten men's games records established at the competition, Paul Ngadjadoum set 2.13 m in the high jump, Oumarou Poro managed 14.89 m in the shot put, Jean-Emmanuel Vanlier threw 49.04 m in the discus, and the Congolese 4 × 100 metres relay team won in a record 40.3 seconds. Rhoda Idowu's winning long jump of 5.60 m was the only women's performance that stood as an all-time games record.

== Medal summary ==
=== Men ===
Event	Gold		Silver		Bronze	
100 metres	Théophile Nkounkou (CGO)	10.2 GR	Jean-Pierre Basségéla (CGO)	10.3	Emmanuel Bitanga (CMR)	10.4
200 metres	Emmanuel Bitanga (CMR)	21.4	Louis Kanza (CGO)	21.5	Théophile Nkounkou (CGO)	21.5
400 metres	Boulot Alladoum (CHA)	48.2	?. Killadoum (CHA)	48.5	Alphonse Mandonda (CGO)	48.8
800 metres	Ghislain Obounghat (CGO)	1:53.7	?. Bakobanza (BDI)	1:54.2	Georges Okomba (GAB)	1:54.5
1500 metres	Esaie Fongang (CMR)	3:56.6	Alain Benga (GAB)	3:56.6	Ghislain Obounghat (CGO)	3:57.1
5000 metres	Gérard Nsabimana (BDI)	14:52.6	Esaie Fongang (CMR)	14:53.0	?. Haja (BDI)	14:57.2
10,000 metres	Fabien Mbarute (RWA)	31:11.8	?. Bazikamwe (BDI)	31:12.8	?. Niyonzima (BDI)	31:46.6
3000 m steeplechase	Ben Dagai Docteur (CHA)	?	Emmanuel M'pioh (CGO)	?	Sylvestre Hanyurwimfura (RWA)	?
110 m hurdles	Denis Dakréo (CMR)	14.5 GR	Bernard Mabikana (CGO)	14.6	Jean-François Boussongou (GAB)	15.1
400 m hurdles	Denis Dakréo (CMR)	52.6 GR	Albert Toro (CAF)	53.2	Albert Ekoté (CGO)	55.0
High jump	Paul Ngadjadoum (CHA)	2.13 m GR	Oussame Mouangangbame (CHA)	2.00 m	Georges Banthoud (CGO)	1.95 m
Pole vault	Jean-Prosper Tsondzabéka (CGO)	3.60 m	Daniel Elebou (CGO)	3.60 m	?. Hicuburundi (BDI)	3.60 m
Long jump	Kémobé Djimassal (CHA)	7.25 m	?. Tetimian (CHA)	7.01 m	Gilbert Babakala (CGO)	6.94 m
Triple jump	Simon Dégoto (CAF)	14.54 m	?. Mahamat (CHA)	14.54 m	Kémobé Djimassal (CHA)	14.49 m
Shot put	Oumarou Poro (CMR)	14.89 m GR	Claude Bessala (CMR)	14.75 m	Casimir Molongo (CGO)	14.42 m
Discus throw	Jean-Emmanuel Vanlier (CMR)	49.04 m GR	Casimir Molongo (CGO)	45.74 m	Isaac Tchoué (CMR)	43.84 m
Javelin throw	Elie Yanyambal (CHA)	68.80 m	François Ganongo (CGO)	68.64 m	Degaulle Gamy (CHA)	68.16 m
4 × 100 m relay	Congo (CGO)	40.3 GR	Central African Republic (CAF)	41.3	Cameroon (CMR)	41.5
4 × 400 m relay	Chad (CHA)	3:14.9	Cameroon (CMR)	3:15.4	Central African Republic (CAF)	3:17.8

=== Women ===
Event	Gold		Silver		Bronze	
100 metres	Brigitte Baégné (CGO)	12.0	Colette Raoumbé (GAB)	12.2	?. Sissa (CMR)	12.4
200 metres	Colette Raoumbé (GAB)	25.4	Brigitte Baégné (CGO)	25.5	?. Ozoumet (CGO)	25.9
400 metres	Agathe Ngo Nack (CMR)	58.2	Claudine Lemongo (CMR)	58.2	Véronique Koumba (GAB)	59.3
800 metres	Eulalie Mbourou (GAB)	2:17.8	Claudine Lemongo (CMR)	2:22.0	Lea Oumba (CGO)	2:23.1
1500 metres	Eulalie Mbourou (GAB)	4:52.4	Sophie Ngo Nkot (CMR)	4:53.7	Catherine Tsatsa (CGO)	4:56.2
High jump	Cécile Ngambi (CMR)	1.65 m	?. Ngo Mbock (CMR)	1.65 m	Myriam Mahamat (CHA)	1.59 m
Long jump	Rhoda Idowu (CMR)	5.60 m GR	?. Fube (CMR)	5.44 m	Colette Raoumbé (GAB)	5.38 m
Shot put	Germaine Wonja (CMR)	11.51 m	?. Bouanga (CGO)	11.22 m	?. Manyongha (CMR)	11.21 m
Discus throw	Germaine Wonja (CMR)	35.28 m	Myriame Mekonodji (CHA)	34.20 m	?. Manyongha (CMR)	32.66 m
Javelin throw	Agnès Tchuinté (CMR)	43.56 m	Marie-Jacqueline Azambou (CMR)	39.60 m	Yvonne Makouala (CGO)	36.52 m
4 × 100 m relay	Cameroon (CMR)	48.5	Gabon (GAB)	50.1	Congo (CGO)	50.3
4 × 400 m relay	Congo (CGO)	4:06.2	Gabon (GAB)	4:06.7	Only 2 teams finished	

== Medal table ==
* Host nation (Gabon)

Rank	Nation	Gold	Silver	Bronze	Total
1	Cameroon (CMR)	13	9	6	28
2	Republic of the Congo (CGO)	6	9	12	27
3	Chad (CHA)	5	5	3	13
4	Gabon (GAB)*	3	4	4	11
5	Burundi (BDI)	1	2	3	6
6	Central African Republic (CAF)	1	2	1	4
7	Rwanda (RWA)	1	0	1	2
Totals (7 entries)		30	31	30	91
