= Athletics at the 1987 Central African Games =

Athletics at the 3rd Central African Games
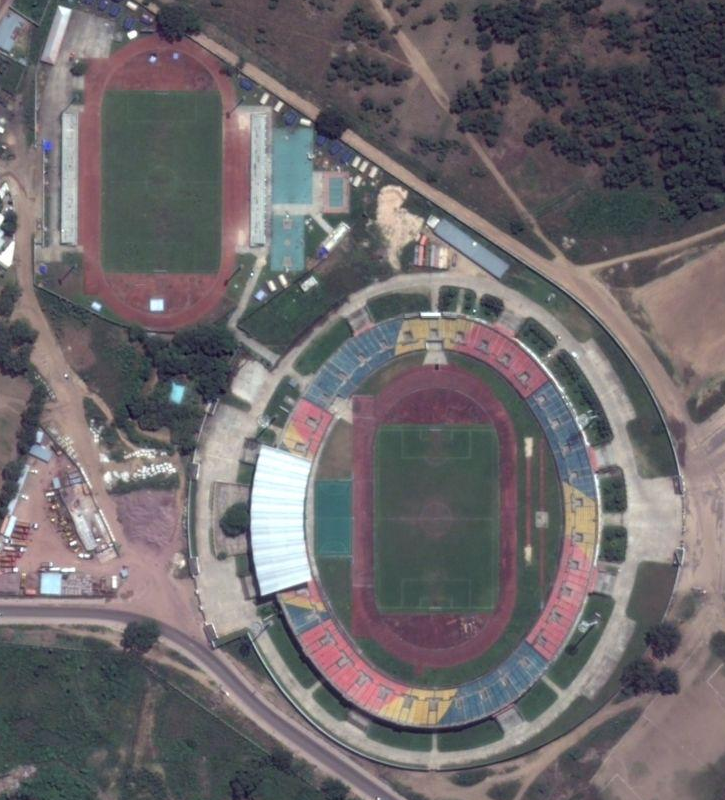
- The host stadium from above
- Dates: 18–30 April
- Host city: Brazzaville, Republic of the Congo
- Venue: Stade de la Revolution
- Events: 36
- Records set: 10 games records

At the 1987 Central African Games, the athletics events were held at the Stade de la Revolution in Brazzaville, Republic of the Congo from 18–30 April.

A total of 36 track and field events (21 for men, 15 for women) were contested – two more than the previous edition as a men's decathlon and a women's 10,000 metres were held for the first time. Cameroon topped the medal table for the third time consecutively, with eleven gold medals among a haul of 27 overall. Burundi won the next most gold medals, with seven, while the host nation Congo had the second highest medal total at 22. In a closely contested affair, nine of the eleven competing nations reached the medal table and six of those reached double digits.

No athlete or relay team managed to achieve three consecutive victories in an event, and only three athletes returned and retained their titles from the 1981 edition: Cameroon's Jean-Pierre Abossolo-Ze topped the men's 400 metres hurdles for the second time, Angola's António Réais won his second men's hammer throw title, and Rwandan Marcianne Mukamurenzi was again women's 1500 metres champion. Ten games records were set during the competition, with highlights including Mukamurenzi knocking nearly ten seconds off the 1500 m record and Jeanne-Nicole Ngo Minyemeck adding nearly five metres to the women's discus throw record.

Five athletes won multiple individual titles at the games. Among the men, the host nation's Henri Ndinga claimed the 100 metres and 200 metres (repeating the feat of his countryman Théophile Nkounkou in 1981) and Pierre Ndongo of Cameroon won the shot put and discus titles. On the women's side, Gisèle Ongollo won the 100 m and 200 m, as well as the 4 × 100 metres relay title, for Gabon, Christine Bakombo of Zaire claimed a 400 metres/800 metres double, and Marcianne Mukamurenzi topped the podium for Rwanda in both the 1500 m and 10,000 m.

== Medal summary ==
=== Men ===
| Event | Gold | | Silver | | Bronze | |
|---|---|---|---|---|---|---|
| 100 metres | Henri Ndinga (CGO) | 10.4 | Arménio Gaspar (ANG) | 10.7 | Christian Mandengué (CGO) | 10.9 |
| 200 metres | Henri Ndinga (CGO) | 21.6 | Christian Mandengué (CGO) | 22.1 | Soter Biményimana (BDI) | 22.1 |
| 400 metres | Pierre Nyabenda (BDI) | 48.2 | Gérard Kengné (CMR) | 49.4 | Jacinto Macamba (ANG) | 49.4 |
| 800 metres | Augustin Ntamuhanga (RWA) | 1:51.8 | Charles Nkazamyampi (BDI) | 1:51.9 | Evariste Haritwinshi (BDI) | 1:52.1 |
| 1500 metres | Diomède Cishahayo (BDI) | 3:50.9 GR | Charles Nkazamyampi (BDI) | 3:51.9 | Eulucane Ndagijimana (BDI) | 3:52.0 |
| 5000 metres | Vital Gahungu (BDI) | 14:48.3 | Nicodeme Nzaabampéma (BDI) | 14:49.0 | Aloys Nyandwi (RWA) | 14:50.0 |
| 10,000 metres | Séraphin Nshinabigoye (BDI) | 31:19.3 | Stephen Mfor Musa (CMR) | 31:20.7 | Bernard Mvuyekure (BDI) | 31:27.7 |
| 110 m hurdles | Joseph Niyonkuru (BDI) | 15.0 | Daniel Ololo (GAB) | 15.2 | Jean-Pierre Abossolo (CMR) | 15.9 |
| 400 m hurdles | Jean-Pierre Abossolo-Ze (CMR) | 53.7 | Faustin Butéra (RWA) | 54.0 | António Agostinho (ANG) | 54.5 |
| 3000 metres steeplechase | Astère Havugiyarémye (BDI) | 9:17.5 GR | Théophile Bangiricengé (BDI) | 9:18.0 | Masini Situ Mbanza (ZAI) | 9:27.6 |
| 4 × 100 m relay | Cameroon (CMR) | 41.9 | Congo (CGO) | 42.5 | Angola (ANG) | 43.3 |
| 4 × 400 m relay | Burundi (BDI) | 3:20.2 | Angola (ANG) | 3:21.7 | Cameroon (CMR) | 3:23.6 |
| High jump | Fred Salle (CMR) | 2.07 m | Hilaire Onwanlélé-Ozimo (GAB) | 2.04 m | Gustave Boukaka (CGO) | 1.98 m |
| Pole vault | Sylvain Lindzondzo (GAB) | 4.20 m GR= | Landry Nzambé-Busugu (GAB) | 4.13 m | Baudry Nkounkou (CGO) | 4.13 m |
| Long jump | Fred Salle (CMR) | 7.57 m GR | António Santos (ANG) | 7.33 m | Pedro Lucas (ANG) | 7.08 m |
| Triple jump | António Santos (ANG) | 15.68 m GR | François Réténo (GAB) | 14.69 m | Pedro Lucas (ANG) | 14.37 m |
| Shot put | Pierre Ndongo (CMR) | 13.90 m | François Ganongo (CGO) | 12.82 m | António Nindi (ANG) | 12.70 m |
| Discus throw | Pierre Ndongo (CMR) | 43.20 m | Jean-Emmanuel Vanlier (CMR) | 42.92 m | António Réais (ANG) | 42.88 m |
| Hammer throw | António Réais (ANG) | 48.72 m | Maurice Gounougou (CGO) | 32.16 m | Antoine Vouandza-Bilongo (CGO) | 24.80 m |
| Javelin throw | Bernardo João (ANG) | 59.80 m | François Ganongo (CGO) | 58.80 m | Bernard Juma (BDI) | 58.44 m |
| Decathlon | Ernest Tché (CMR) | 6108 pts GR | Landry Nzambé-Busugu (GAB) | 5767 pts | Jean-Baptiste Magambou (GAB) | 4991 pts |

=== Women ===
| Event | Gold | | Silver | | Bronze | |
|---|---|---|---|---|---|---|
| 100 metres | Gisèle Ongollo (GAB) | 11.9 | Monique Kengné (CMR) | 12.2 | Higuette Mboumba (GAB) | 12.4 |
| 200 metres | Gisèle Ongollo (GAB) | 25.1 | Suzie Tanefo (CMR) | 25.3 | Monique Kengné (CMR) | 25.5 |
| 400 metres | Christine Bakombo (ZAI) | 56.1 GR | Suzie Tanefo (CMR) | 56.6 | Assumpta Achuo-Bei (CMR) | 57.8 |
| 800 metres | Christine Bakombo (ZAI) | 2:16.1 | Assumpta Achuo-Bei (CMR) | 2:16.6 | Thérèse Bazubagira (RWA) | 2:18.4 |
| 1500 metres | Marcianne Mukamurenzi (RWA) | 4:33.1 GR | Daphrose Nyiramutuzo (RWA) | 4:38.5 | María Rosario Lomba (STP) | 4:50.4 |
| 3000 metres | Daphrose Nyiramutuzo (RWA) | 10:08.9 | ?. Nyiraneza (RWA) | 10:26.7 | Aimerencienne Dianzinga (CGO) | 10:34.3 |
| 10,000 metres | Marcianne Mukamurenzi (RWA) | 34:59.2 GR | Jacqueline Nyirabatembérézi (RWA) | 36:55.3 | Marie-François Kagna (CGO) | 42:17.3 |
| 100 m hurdles | Françoise Mistoul (GAB) | 15.9 | Patricia Kémenguet (CGO) | 18.0 | Céline Maroundou (CGO) | 18.2 |
| 4 × 100 m relay | Gabon (GAB) | 48.5 | Cameroon (CMR) | 48.6 | Congo (CGO) | 51.0 |
| 4 × 400 m relay | Cameroon (CMR) | 4:01.1 | Congo (CGO) | 4:07.3 | Gabon (GAB) | 4:22.2 |
| High jump | Marie-Josée Kéritila (CGO) | 1.67 m | Lolita Nack (CMR) | 1.58 m | Chantal Kotto (CMR) | 1.55 m |
| Long jump | Patricia Kémenguet (CGO) | 5.21 m | Marie-Josée Kéritila (CGO) | 5.05 m | Eminence Bâ Mézui (GAB) | 4.99 m |
| Shot put | Agathe Ngo Nack (CMR) | 12.40 m | Marie-Gabrielle Tombou (CMR) | 12.32 m | Flavienne Ntsimou (CGO) | 11.10 m |
| Discus throw | Jeanne-Nicole Ngo Minyemeck (CMR) | 44.56 m GR | Marie-Gabrielle Tombou (CMR) | 42.40 m | Filomena Silva (ANG) | 35.08 m |
| Javelin throw | Régine Pokollé (CMR) | 38.20 m | Christiane Nkounkou-Fouéti (CGO) | 38.14 m | Olga Biang (GAB) | 31.70 m |

== Medal table ==
* Host nation (Republic of the Congo)

| Rank | Nation | Gold | Silver | Bronze | Total |
|---|---|---|---|---|---|
| 1 | Cameroon (CMR) | 11 | 11 | 5 | 27 |
| 2 | Burundi (BDI) | 7 | 4 | 5 | 16 |
| 3 | Gabon (GAB) | 5 | 5 | 5 | 15 |
| 4 | Republic of the Congo (CGO)* | 4 | 9 | 9 | 22 |
| 5 | Rwanda (RWA) | 4 | 4 | 2 | 10 |
| 6 | Angola (ANG) | 3 | 3 | 8 | 14 |
| 7 | Democratic Republic of the Congo (ZAI) | 2 | 0 | 1 | 3 |
| 8 | São Tomé and Príncipe (STP) | 0 | 0 | 1 | 1 |
| Totals (8 entries) | | 36 | 36 | 36 | 108 |
