= Antoine Nkounkou =

Congolese sprinter

Personal information
- Full name: Antoine Ntsana Nkounkou
- Nickname: Jean Madia
- Nationality: Congolese
- Born: 13 September 1948 or 18 August 1948 Pointe-Noire
- Died: 11 November 2017 (aged 69)

Sport
- Sport: Sprinting
- Event: 4 × 100 metres relay

Antoine Ntsana Nkounkou (13 September or 18 August 1948 – 11 November 2017), also known as N.A. Nkounkou, was a Congolese sprinter. He competed in the men's 4 × 100 metres relay at the 1972 Summer Olympics.

== Career ==
Following an appearance at the 1970 World University Games where Nkounkou barely missed qualification to the 100 m semifinals and was disqualified in the 4 × 100 m, Nkounkou's talent was first discovered in 1971, at an athletics meeting in Abidjan where Nkounkou again contested the 100 m and 4 × 100 m. Nkounkou won an individual gold medal in the 100 m as well as 4 × 100 m silver at the 1972 Central African Cup, the precursor event to the Central African Games. This earned him selection onto the Congolese team at the 1972 Olympics, where he and his teammates (Jean Pierre Basségéla, Louis Nkandza and Théophile Nkounkou) were the only Congolese competitors to advance past the first round, and as of 2023 remain the only Congolese team to ever reach the semi-finals of the 4 × 100 metres relay at the Olympics.

Following their success, that squad was nicknamed the "Migs Congolais", and they were active in international competition throughout the 1970s and 80s. Highlights included winning gold at the 1976 Central African Games, gold at the 1981 Central African Games, and silver in the 4 x 100 at the 1987 Central African Games, as well as an individual silver medal for Nkounkou at the 1976 Games.

The team also qualified for the finals and placed 7th at the 1979 World University Games, in addition to competing in the 1983 edition. With a time of 39.5 seconds, they broke the Republic of Congo record in the 4 × 100 m at the African Games.

They qualified for the African Championships finals three times, at the inaugural edition in 1979 and at the following two editions in Cairo and in Rabat.

Nkounkou is sometimes confused with Antoine Kiakouama, who is erroneously listed as Antoine Ntsana in some sources.

== Personal life ==
Nkounkou graduated from the Russian State University of Physical Education, Sport, Youth and Tourism in Moscow. In 1973, he was awarded the honorary Ordre du Dévouement Congolais for his accomplishments. He married and had six children.

By the late 1980s, Nkounkou and his team had retired due to age, and Nkounkou attended the 1992 Summer Olympics as an official. He later became a physical education teacher and athletics coach. Nkounkou co-founded the les Migs congolais pour la promotion de l’athlétisme association on 18 July 2011.
