= Central African Athletics Championships =

International athletics competition

- Genre: outdoor track and field
- Venue: varies
- Participants: Central African nations
- Organiser: Confederation of African Athletics

The Central African Athletics Championships are an international athletics competition between countries in Central Africa. First held in 1976, it has been held sporadically since then, with the most recent edition being the ninth championships in 2015.

The competition features mostly outdoor track and field events, though the 1991 championships had a men's marathon and the 1999 championships hosted a men's 20 kilometres race walk. There was also a cross country running championships held in 2000. These competitions were all hosted separately from the Central African Games as well as the East and Central African Championships.

== Editions ==
Edition	Year	City	Country	Date	Nations	Athletes
1	1975	Yaoundé	Cameroon			
2	1978	Libreville	Gabon			
3	1980	Brazzaville	Republic of the Congo			
4	1995	Yaoundé	Cameroon			
5	1996	N'Djamena	Chad			
6	1999	Garoua	Cameroon			
7	2007	Kinshasa	Democratic Republic of the Congo			
8	2013	Brazzaville	Republic of the Congo			
9	2015	Yaoundé	Cameroon			

== Participation ==
- Angola
- Burundi
- Cameroon
- Central African Republic
- Chad
- Republic of the Congo
- Democratic Republic of the Congo
- Gabon
- Rwanda
- São Tomé and Príncipe

== Central African Cross Country Championships ==
In 2000, Bujumbura in Burundi staged the only known edition of a Central African Cross Country Championships. Long and short course races were held for both men and women, with Lambert Ndayikéza (36:29) and Béatrice Iradukunda (28:39) the long course winners and Onèsphore Nkunzimana (12:40) and Épiphanie Nyirabaramé (15:24) being the short course winners. Rwanda's Nyirabarame was the only winner not from the host nation. Burundi and Rwanda are the only nations in the region with an international pedigree in long-distance running.

== Champions ==
=== Men's 100 metres ===
- 1975: Jean-Pierre Basségéla (CGO)
- 1978: Boulot Alladoum (CHA)
- 1980: Antoine Kiakouama (CGO)
- 1995: Claude Toukéné-Guébogo (CMR)
- 1996: Benjamin Sirimou (CMR)
- 1999: Alexandre Dallé Dallé (CMR)

=== Men's 200 metres ===
- 1975: Théophile Nkounkou (CGO)
- 1978: Boulot Alladoum (CHA)
- 1980: Antoine Kiakouama (CGO)
- 1995: Benjamin Sirimou (CMR)
- 1996: Bernard Silfébé (CMR)
- 1999: Jean-Francis Ngapout (CMR)

=== Men's 400 metres ===
- 1975: Alphonse Mandonda (CGO)
- 1978: ?. N'Doubadoum (CHA)
- 1980: Ruben Inácio (ANG)
- 1995: Médard Makanga (CGO)
- 1996: Bernard Silfébé (CMR)
- 1999: Médard Makanga (CGO)

=== Men's 800 metres ===
- 1975: Matéké Ekwé (CMR)
- 1978: Faustin Butéra (RWA)
- 1980: António Mota Gomes (ANG)
- 1995: Franck Matamba (GAB)
- 1996: Sali Mouhamadou (CMR)
- 1999: Oumarou Ibrahima (CMR)

=== Men's 1500 metres ===
- 1975: Matéké Ekwé (CMR)
- 1978: Alain Benga (GAB)
- 1980: Ghislain Obounghat (CGO)
- 1995: Oumarou Ibrahima (CMR)
- 1996: Oumarou Ibrahima (CMR)
- 1999: Bonaventure Niyanizigyé (BDI)

=== Men's 5000 metres ===
- 1975: Esaie Fongang (CMR)
- 1978: Fabien Mbarute (RWA)
- 1980: Fabien Mbarute (RWA)
- 1995: Thomas Toyi (BDI)
- 1996: Pierre Foka (CMR)
- 1999: Bonaventure Niyanizigyé (BDI)

=== Men's 10,000 metres ===
- 1975: Stephen Mfor Musa (CMR)
- 1978: Fabien Mbarute (RWA)
- 1980: Fabien Mbarute (RWA)
- 1995: Pierre Foka (CMR)
- 1996: Pierre Foka (CMR)
- 1999: Dieudonné Disi (RWA)

=== Men's marathon ===
- 1980: Ladislas Hakuzimana (RWA)

=== Men's 3000 metres steeplechase ===
- 1975: Bwela Belanga Bokendo (ZAI)
- 1978: Sylvestre Hanyurwimfura (RWA)
- 1980: Emmanuel M'pioh (CGO)

=== Men's 110 metres hurdles ===
Abdoulaye Sène of Senegal placed first at the 1995 event as a guest athlete.

- 1975: Denis Dakréo (CMR)
- 1978: ?
- 1980: Bernard Mabikana (CGO)
- 1995: Christian Codjia (GAB)
- 1996: Not held
- 1999: Ange Sama Douala (CMR)

=== Men's 400 metres hurdles ===
- 1975: Denis Dakréo (CMR)
- 1978: Albert Toro (CAF)
- 1980: Cyrille Boukosso (GAB)
- 1995: Médard Makanga (CGO)
- 1996: Not held
- 1999: Médard Makanga (CGO)

=== Men's high jump ===
- 1975: Paul Ngadjadoum (CHA)
- 1978: Paul Ngadjadoum (CHA)
- 1980: Édouard Messan (GAB)
- 1995: Mathias Ngadjadoum (CHA)
- 1996: Mathias Ngadjadoum (CHA)
- 1999: Hilaire Onwanlélé-Ozimo (GAB)

=== Men's pole vault ===
- 1975: Jean-Prosper Tsondzabéka (CGO)
- 1978: Sylvain Lindzondzo (GAB)
- 1980: Daniel Elebou (CGO)

=== Men's long jump ===
Guy Mialou of Senegal placed first at the 1995 event as a guest athlete.

- 1975: Gilbert Babakala (CGO)
- 1978: Kémobé Djimassal (CHA)
- 1980: Alfredo Melão (ANG)
- 1995: Germain Bolanga (CMR)
- 1996: Germain Bolanga (CMR)
- 1999: Frédéric Miyoupo (CMR)

=== Men's triple jump ===
- 1975: ?. Oba (CGO)
- 1978: Dgal Kara Gahben Kara (CHA)
- 1980: Alfredo Melão (ANG)
- 1995: Roger Martial Ngouloubi (CGO)
- 1996: Roger Martial Ngouloubi (CGO)
- 1999: Yvon Ngoua Nguema (GAB)

=== Men's shot put ===
- 1975: Oumarou Poro (CMR)
- 1978: ?. Kengué (GAB)
- 1980: Hugo Pereira (ANG)
- 1995: Quentin Soné Ehawa (CMR)
- 1996: Athanase Oloko (CMR)
- 1999: Désiré Banouga (CMR)

=== Men's discus throw ===
- 1975: Casimir Molongo (CGO)
- 1978: ?
- 1980: Grégoire Bakaki (CGO)
- 1995: Mickaël Conjungo (CAF)
- 1996: Athanase Oloko (CMR)
- 1999: Modeste Dassi (CMR)

=== Men's javelin throw ===
- 1975: François Ganongo (CGO)
- 1978: Elie Yanyambal (CHA)
- 1980: François Ganongo (CGO)
- 1995: Mickaël Conjungo (CAF)
- 1996: Dillah Naiwala (CHA)
- 1999: Cyriaque Ayard (CAF)

=== Men's 20 km walk ===
- 1999: Fidèle Ngoufo (CMR)

=== Men's 4 × 100 metres relay ===
- 1975: Congo (CGO)
- 1978: Chad (CHA)
- 1980: Congo (CGO)
- 1995: Gabon (GAB)
- 1996: Gabon (GAB)
- 1999" Cameroon (CMR)

=== Men's 4 × 400 metres relay ===
- 1975" Cameroon (CMR)
- 1978: Chad (CHA)
- 1980: Congo (CGO)
- 1995" Cameroon (CMR)
- 1996" Cameroon (CMR)
- 1999: Congo (CGO)

=== Women's 100 metres ===
- 1975: Brigitte Baégné (CGO)
- 1978: Colette Raoumbé (GAB)
- 1980: Françoise M'Pika (CGO)
- 1995: Georgette Nkoma (CMR)
- 1996: Myriam Léonie Mani (CMR)
- 1999: Anne-Marie Mouri-Nkeng (CMR)

=== Women's 200 metres ===
- 1975: Josephine Awoukeng (CMR)
- 1978: Colette Raoumbé (GAB)
- 1980: Filomena Mauricio (ANG)
- 1995: Georgette Nkoma (CMR)
- 1996: Myriam Léonie Mani (CMR)
- 1999: Hortense Béwouda (CMR)

=== Women's 400 metres ===
- 1975: Claudine Lemongo (CMR)
- 1978: Adèle Mengué (GAB)
- 1980: Adèle Mengué (GAB)
- 1995: Denise Ouabangui (CAF)
- 1996: Claudine Komgang (CMR)
- 1999: Madeleine Ndongo (CMR)

=== Women's 800 metres ===
- 1975: Claudine Lemongo (CMR)
- 1978: Myriame Tamenti Raingar (CHA)
- 1980: Francisca Xavier (ANG)
- 1995: Stéphanie Nicole Zanga (CMR)
- 1996: Stéphanie Nicole Zanga (CMR)
- 1999: Euridice Borges Semedo (STP)

=== Women's 1500 metres ===
- 1975: ?. Mepoungo (GAB)
- 1978: Marie-Beatrice Kanziga (RWA)
- 1980: Appollinaire Nyinawabéra (RWA)
- 1995: Marie Python (CMR)
- 1996: Léontine Tsiba (CGO)
- 1999: Thérèse Ngono Etoundi (CMR)

=== Women's 3000 metres ===
- 1980: Appollinaire Nyinawabéra (RWA)

=== Women's 5000 metres ===
- 1995: Florence Djépé (CMR)
- 1996: Véronique Bingouma (GAB)
- 1999: Josiane Abougone (GAB)

=== Women's 100 metres hurdles ===
- 1980: Anne-Lise Montoulieu (GAB)
- 1995: Louisette Thobi (CMR)
- 1996: Not held
- 1999: Naide Gomes (STP)

=== Women's 400 metres hurdles ===
- 1999: Naide Gomes (STP)

=== Women's high jump ===
Irène Tiendrébéogo of Burkina Faso placed first at the 1995 event competing as a guest athlete.

- 1975: Cécile Ngambi (CMR)
- 1978: ?
- 1980: Brigitte Revangué (GAB)
- 1995: Mary Dolly Zé Oyono (CMR)
- 1996: Lolita Nack (CMR)
- 1999: Naide Gomes (STP)

=== Women's long jump ===
- 1975: Rhoda Idowu (CMR)
- 1978: Colette Raoumbé (GAB)
- 1980: Hortense Mongosso (CMR)
- 1995: Françoise Mbango Etone (CMR)
- 1996: Célestine Bayighomog (CMR)
- 1999: Mary Dolly Zé Oyono (CMR)

=== Women's triple jump ===
- 1995: Stéphanie Betga (CMR)
- 1996: Solange Akéna Mfou'ou (CMR)
- 1999: Brianie Massaka Youlou (CGO)

=== Women's shot put ===
- 1975: Germaine Wonja (CMR)
- 1978: Odette Mistoul (GAB)
- 1980: Odette Mistoul (GAB)
- 1995: Mary Dolly Zé Oyono (CMR)
- 1996: Monique Ngongoué (CMR)
- 1999: Christiane Falaita (CGO)

=== Women's discus throw ===
- 1975: Germaine Wonja (CMR)
- 1978: Myriame Mekonodji (CHA)
- 1980: Filomena Silva (ANG)
- 1995: Pulchérie Simé (CMR)
- 1996: Pulchérie Simé (CMR)
- 1999: Pulchérie Simé (CMR)

=== Women's javelin throw ===
- 1975: Agnès Tchuinté (CMR)
- 1978: Bernadette Naloumal (CHA)
- 1980: Técle Libata (CGO)
- 1995: Odile Choumo (CMR)
- 1996: Monique Djikada (CMR)
- 1999: Monique Djikada (CMR)

=== Women's 10,000 metres walk ===
- 1999: Anne-Hortense Ebéna (CMR)

=== Women's 4 × 100 metres relay ===
- 1975: Cameroon (CMR)
- 1978: Gabon (GAB)
- 1980: ?
- 1995: Cameroon (CMR)
- 1996: Cameroon (CMR)
- 1999: Cameroon (CMR)

=== Women's 4 × 400 metres relay ===
- 1975" Cameroon (CMR)
- 1978: Chad (CHA)
- 1980: ?
- 1995: Cameroon (CMR)
- 1996: Cameroon (CMR)
- 1999: Cameroon (CMR)
