= Central African Championships =

Central African Championships may refer to:

- Central African Games
- 1953 Central African Games, held once distinct from but as a precursor to the 1976 Central African Games
- Central African Athletics Championships
- Central African Cross Country Championships
