= Kémobé Djirmassal =

Chadian long jumper

Personal information
- Born: February 26, 1954 (age 72)

Sport
- Country: Chad
- Event: Long jump
Medal record
Men's athletics
Representing Chad
Central African Championships
Gold medal – first place	1978 Libreville	Long jump
Central African Games
Gold medal – first place	1976 Libreville	Long jump
Bronze medal – third place	1976 Libreville	Triple jump
Gold medal – first place	1981 Luanda	Long jump
Bronze medal – third place	1981 Luanda	Triple jump

Kémobé Djirmassal (born 26 February 1954) is a track and field athlete who competed in the long jump internationally for Chad. Djirmassal represented Chad at the 1984 Summer Olympics in Los Angeles.

== Career ==
Djirmassal won gold medals at the Central African Athletics Championships and Central African Games in the long jump, and other medals in the triple jump. He set Chadian national records in both events. He set his long jump personal best of 7.42 metres in 1978.

In his 1984 Olympic long jump qualifying group, he jumped 7.37 metres. He finished 8th in the group and 17th overall, not reaching the final.

== Personal life ==
Dijrmassal was the president of the Chadian Olympians Association. He also became the national technical director of athletics in Chad as well as a coach.
