= List of Republic of the Congo records in athletics =

The following are the national records in athletics in the Republic of the Congo maintained by the Congo's national athletics federation: Fédération Congolaise d'Athlétisme (FCA).

== Outdoor ==
Key to tables: Awaiting ratification Record not kept by FCA

+ = en route to a longer distance
h = hand timing
OT = oversized track (> 200m in circumference)

=== Men ===
Event	Record	Athlete	Date	Meet	Place	Ref.
100 m	10.27 (±0.0 m/s)	Dorian Keletela	22 August 2021	Meeting International	Schifflange, Luxembourg	
200 m	20.74 (+1.0 m/s)	Roger Anguono-Moké	29 May 2003		Sint-Niklaas, Belgium	
400 m	45.64	Gilles Anthony Afoumba	25 June 2019		Montgeron, France	
800 m	1:49.5 h	Ghislain Obounghat	1 May 1983		Tunis, Tunisia	
1500 m	3:47.03	Alex Ngouari Mouissi	13 September 2015	African Games	Brazzaville, Republic of the Congo	
1500 m	3:44.97	Alex Ngouari Mouissi	8 July 2023	Meeting National à thème de l'Est Lyonnais	Lyon, France	
1500 m	3:42.11	Alex Ngouari Mouissi	19 June 2024	Meeting National	Bordeaux, France	
3000 m	8:30.25	Emmanuel Mpioh	14 June 1984		Paris, France	
3000 m	8:14.30	Alex Ngouari Mouissi	21 May 2023	French Club Championships N1A Poule B	Bondoufle, France	
3000 m	8:06.17	Alex Ngouari	31 May 2024		Angouleme, France	
5000 m	14:33.4 h	Obva Elengha	31 May 1991		Brazzaville, Republic of the Congo	
5000 m	14:01.20	Alex Ngouari Mouissi	24 June 2023	Meeting National	Carquefou, France	
10,000 m	30:48.27	Obva Elengha	22 September 1991		Cairo, Egypt	
10 km (road)	29:44	Alex Ngouari Mouissi	8 October 2023	10 km de La Flèche	La Flèche, France	
Half marathon	1:00:53	Maël Okouéké	24 August 2015		Brazzaville, Congo	
Marathon	2:26:01	Bernard Tsati	16 September 1990		Puteaux, France	
110 m hurdles	14.19	Hakim Mazou	17 September 1995	All-Africa Games	Harare, Zimbabwe	
400 m hurdles	52.60	Médard Makanga	16 September 1999	All-Africa Games	Johannesburg, South Africa	
400 m hurdles	52.06	Emmanuel Tamba Elengha	4 August 2023	Jeux de la Francophonie	Kinshasa, Democratic Republic of the Congo	
3000 m steeplechase	9:05.58	Emmanuel Mpioh	6 August 1984	Olympic Games	Los Angeles, United States	
High jump	2.14 m	Henri Elendé	6 September 1964		Châtellerault, France	
High jump	2.14 m	Jean-Claude Silao	1 June 1997		Dakar, Senegal	
Pole vault	4.25 m	Jean-Prosper Tsondzabéka	14 June 1969		Tunis, Tunisia	
Long jump	7.95 m (−0.7 m/s)	Archel-Evrard Biniakounou	28 August 2019	African Games	Rabat, Morocco	
Triple jump	15.91 m	Andrew Issaka	2 July 2015		Joinville, Brazil	
Triple jump	15.91 m (−1.3 m/s)	Andrew Issaka	14 September 2015	African Games	Brazzaville, Republic of the Congo	
Shot put	21.20 m	Franck Elemba	18 August 2016	Olympic Games	Rio de Janeiro, Brazil	
Discus throw	54.30 m	Franck Elemba	16 April 2016		Benslimane, Morocco	
Hammer throw	42.14 m	Maurice Ganougou	13 June 1964		Brazzaville, Republic of the Congo	
Javelin throw	68.61 m	Jean-Michel Mantsounga	23/24 June 2010		Brazzaville, Republic of the Congo	
Decathlon	6475 pts	Célestine Moussambote Kengué	16–17 July 2004	African Championships	Brazzaville, Republic of the Congo	
Decathlon	100m / Long jump / Shot put / High jump / 400m / 110m H / Discus / Pole vault / Javelin / 1500m; 11.15 / 7.34 m / 11.02 m / 1.93 m / 50.16 / 16.72 / 28.49 m / 3.80 m / 36.95 m / 4:51.54					
20 km walk (road)	1:41:45	Roméo Ambomo	15 September 2015	African Games	Brazzaville, Republic of the Congo	
20 km walk (road)	1:33:18 (Note: doubtful distance)	Roméo Ambomo	4 August 2013		Brazzaville, Republic of the Congo	
50 km walk (road)						
4 × 100 m relay	39.54 A	Republic of the Congo; N.A. Nkounkou; Théophile Nkounkou; Louis Kanza; Jean-Pierre Basségéla	12 September 1979	Universiade	Mexico City, Mexico	
4 × 400 m relay	3:11.28	Republic of the Congo; G. Mankou-Mankou; Alphonse Mandonda; Ghislain Obounghat; Jean-Didace Bémou	26 July 1981	Universiade	Bucharest, Romania	

=== Women ===
Event	Record	Athlete	Date	Meet	Place	Ref.
100 m	11.22 (+0.5 m/s)	Natacha Ngoye Akamabi	31 July 2023	Jeux de la Francophonie	Kinshasa, Democratic Republic of the Congo	
200 m	23.04 (+1.0 m/s)	Natacha Ngoye Akamabi	20 July 2019		Yaoundé, Cameroon	
200 m	23.01 (−0.2 m/s)	Natacha Ngoye Akamabi	3 August 2023	Jeux de la Francophonie	Kinshasa, Democratic Republic of the Congo	
400 m	54.20 (Note: by World Athletics Profile)	Marcelle Bouele Bondo	26 August 2019	African Games	Rabat, Morocco	
400 m	54.13 (Note: by World Athletics statistic handbook)	Natacha Ngoye Akamabi	26 July 2014		Brazzaville, Republic of the Congo	
400 m	53.96	Elodie Malessara	18 March 2024	African Games	Accra, Ghana	
400 m	53.77	Elodie Malessara	19 March 2024	African Games	Accra, Ghana	
400 m	53.25	Elodie Malessara	21 June 2024		Douala, Cameroon	
800 m	2:04.08	Léontine Tsiba	22 September 2000	Olympic Games	Sydney, Australia	
1500 m	4:21.60	Léontine Tsiba	22 August 1998		Dakar, Senegal	
3000 m	9:43.8 h	Perpétue Malanda-Senda	11 August 1998		Pointe-Noire, Republic of the Congo	
5000 m	18:12.44	Ida Brunelle Kihindou	22 October 2005		Brazzaville, Republic of the Congo	
10,000 m	37:19.0	Jodelle Ossou Wakeyi	7–9 August 2015		Yaoundé, Cameroon	
Marathon	3:20:56	Ida-Brunelle Kiyindou	4 April 2004	Paris Marathon	Paris, France	
100 m hurdles	14.40	Christiane Diabakana	13 July 2003		Lyon, France	
400 m hurdles	59.63	Addo Ndala	7 July 1991		Dreux, France	
400 m hurdles	59.54	Patrone Kouvoutoukila	4 August 2023	Jeux de la Francophonie	Kinshasa, Democratic Republic of the Congo	
3000 m steeplechase						
High jump	1.70 m	Addo Ndala	16 June 1990		Quimper, France	
High jump	1.70 m	Tania Matshoko	8 May 2016		Antony, France	
Pole vault	2.40 m	Carine Golom Mbeh	15 July 2004	African Championships	Brazzaville, Republic of the Congo	
Long jump	6.31 m (+1.2 m/s)	Marie Mbuya Mala	7 July 2018	French Championships	Albi, France	
Triple jump	12.73 m	Brianie Massaka-Youlou	18 September 1999	All-Africa Games	Johannesburg, South Africa	
Shot put	13.95 m	Christiane Diabakana	31 May 2003		Taverny, France	
Discus throw	38.83 m	Fanny Wigile Ossala	16 September 2015	All-Africa Games	Brazzaville, Republic of the Congo	
Hammer throw	66.43 m	Jennifer Batu	2 August 2018	African Championships	Asaba, Nigeria	
Javelin throw	46.95 m	Stella Jenny Vieira	15 September 2015	All-Africa Games	Brazzaville, Republic of the Congo	
Heptathlon	4851 pts	Christiane Diabakana	19-20 July 2003		Rostock, Germany	
Heptathlon	100m H / High jump / Shot put / 200m / Long jump / Javelin / 800m; 14.56 / 1.60 m / 13.04 m / 26.71 / 5.87 m / 29.66 m / 2:49.62					
20 km walk (road)	2:13:45	Lilia Bitsoumani	15 September 2015	All-Africa Games	Brazzaville, Republic of the Congo	
4 × 100 m relay	45.49	Republic of the Congo; Marcelle Bouele Bondo; Elodie Malessara; Patrone Kouvoutoukila; Natacha Ngoye Akambi	2 August 2023	Jeux de la Francophonie	Kinshasa, Democratic Republic of the Congo	
4 × 400 m relay	3:49.46	Republic of the Congo; Sarah Nguet; Ruth Okounikala; Duval Moliba; Natacha Ngoye Akamabi	17 September 2015	All-Africa Games	Brazzaville, Republic of the Congo	

== Indoor ==
=== Men ===
Event	Record	Athlete	Date	Meet	Place	Ref.
60 m	6.63	Roger Anguono-Moké	7 February 2003		Chemnitz, Germany	
200 m	21.39	Gilles Anthony Afoumba	25 January 2020	Meeting National Elite	Nantes, France	
400 m	46.68	Gilles Anthony Afoumba	5 February 2020		Reims, France	
800 m	1:56.23	Jean-Bosco Mondzomba	8 March 1991	World Championships	Seville, Spain	
1500 m	4:02.55	Alex Ngouari-Mouissi	12 March 2010	World Championships	Doha, Qatar	
3000 m						
60 m hurdles	7.85	Hakim Mazou	23 February 1997		Magglingen, Switzerland	
High jump	2.02 m	Daniel Nguembou	17 January 2015		Hirson, France	
Pole vault	4.00 m	Célestin Moussamboté Kengué	7 February 2004		Nogent-sur-Oise, France	
Long jump	7.32 m	Hakim Mazou	24 February 1991		Magglingen, Switzerland	
Triple jump	15.54 m	Farel Mepandy	29 January 2000		Birmingham, United Kingdom	
Shot put	20.86 m	Franck Elemba	24 February 2017	Meeting Ville de Madrid	Madrid, Spain	
Heptathlon						
Heptathlon	60m / Long jump / Shot put / High jump / 60m H / Pole vault / 1000m					
5000 m walk						
4 × 400 m relay						

=== Women ===
Event	Record	Athlete	Date	Meet	Place	Ref.
60 m	7.30	Lorène Bazolo	9 January 2015	Meeting Moniz Pereira	Jamor, Portugal	
60 m	7.30	Natacha Ngoye Akamabi	3 February 2024	IFAM Gent	Ghent, Belgium	
200 m	23.41	Natacha Ngoye Akamabi	21 January 2024	Régionaux Elite CJES	Val-de-Reuil, France	
400 m	56.07	Lasnet Nkouka	19 February 1995		Bordeaux, France	
800 m	2:08.97	Léontine Tsiba	10 February 2001		Blacksburg, United States	
800 m	2:06.46 OT	Léontine Tsiba	28 January 2000		Johnson City, United States	
1500 m						
3000 m						
60 m hurdles	8.77	Soléne Eboulabeka	6 January 2007		Aubière, France	
60 m hurdles	8.77	Soléne Eboulabeka	28 January 2007		Eaubonne, France	
High jump	1.63 m	Indaye Greta N'Tiri	4 February 2006		Eaubonne, France	
Pole vault	2.00 m	Amanda Ngandu-Ntumba	30 November 2013		Lyon, France	
Long jump	6.24 m	Marie Mbuya Mala	17 February 2019	French Championships	Miramas, France	
Triple jump	12.60 m	Indaye Greta N'Tiri	25 February 2006		Ancona, Italy	
Shot put	14.11 m	Christiane Diabakana	8 December 2006		Eaubonne, France	
Pentathlon	3362 pts	Indaye Greta N'Tiri	3 February 2007		Eaubonne, France	
Pentathlon	60m H / High jump / Shot put / Long jump / 800m; 9.03 / 1.60 m / 10.41 m / 5.61 m / 2:52.92					
3000 m walk						
4 × 400 m relay						
