= List of Chadian records in athletics =

The following are the national records in athletics in Chad maintained by Chad's national athletics federation: Federation Tchadienne d'Athletisme (FTA).

== Outdoor ==
Key to tables: Awaiting ratification Record not kept by FTA

=== Men ===
Event	Record	Athlete	Date	Meet	Place	Ref.
100 m	10.18 (+0.9 m/s)	Mahamat Goubaye Youssouf	28 April 2024	Qatari Championships	Doha, Qatar	
200 m	20.69	Abdourahim Haroun	5 May 2012		Ouagadougou, Burkina Faso	
400 m	46.43	Mahamat Goubaye Youssouf	30 June 2016	XXXV Troféu Brasil	São Bernardo do Campo, Brazil	
800 m	1:48.6 h	Ahmed Issa	26 August 1962		Thonon-les-Bains, France	
1500 m	3:47.8 h	Ahmed Issa	22 July 1965	All-Africa Games	Brazzaville, Republic of Congo	
1500 m	3:47.03	Saleh Hammad (Note: listed as for UAE, but change of nationality from ETH to UAE not confirmed)	3 May 2024	International Grand Prix Meeting	Dubai, United Arab Emirates	
3000 m	8:15.57	Ali Hissein Mahamat	28 June 2019	Meeting Internazionale Città di Nembro	Nembro, Italy	
5000 m	14:13.35	Ahmat Abdou-Daoud	1 June 2012		Carquefou, France ʕ|	
10,000 m	30:47.29	Yaya Ismaïl	23 September 1988	Olympic Games	Seoul, South Korea	
10 km (road)	29:54	Ali Hissein Mahamat	5 September 2021	Grand Lac	Aix-les-Bains, France	
Half marathon	1:05:32	Ahmat Abdou-Daoud	18 October 2015		Niort, France	
Half marathon	1:05:32	Ahmat Abdou-Daoud	6 March 2016	Paris Half Marathon	Paris, France	
Marathon	2:19:34	Ahmat Abdou-Daoud	29 November 2015		La Rochelle, France	
110 m hurdles	15.62	Alio Hassana	24 September 1994		Viry-Châtillon, France	
400 m hurdles	54.25	Ali Faudet	24 June 1994		Besançon, France	
3000 m steeplechase	9:59.6 h	Benoît Kassiré	20 July 1965	All-Africa Games	Brazzaville, Republic of Congo	
High jump	2.17 m	Mahamat Idriss	10 April 1966		N'Djamena, Chad	
High jump	2.17 m	Paul Ngadjadoum	29 March 1993		N'Djamena, Chad	
High jump	2.17 m	Mathias Ngadjadoum	7 April 1996		N'Djamena, Chad	
Pole vault	3.80 m	Hubert Djimtoloum	1963		Brazzaville, Republic of Congo	
Long jump	7.42 m	Kémobé Djimassal	25 July 1978	All-Africa Games	Algiers, Algeria	
Triple jump	15.30 m	Kémobé Djimassal	21 April 1982		N'Djamena, Chad	
Shot put	14.75 m	Fabien Simkadi	December 1970		N'Djamena, Chad	
Discus throw	48.80 m	Fabien Simkadi	1974		N'Djamena, Chad	
Hammer throw						
Javelin throw	54.42 m	Dillah Naiwala	6 April 1996		N'Djamena, Chad	
Decathlon	3818 pts h	Louis Magloire Ntankeu	26-27 May 2007		Clermont-Ferrand, France	
Decathlon	100m / Long jump / Shot put / High jump / 400m / 110m H / Discus / Pole vault / Javelin / 1500m; 11.9 / 5.33 m / 8.06 m / 1.59 m / 1:02.17 / 16.77 / 17.92 m / 1.80 m / 34.99 m / 6:10.32					
Decathlon	6244 pts	Philippe Doudet	10 May 1971		Abidjan, Côte d'Ivoire	
Decathlon	100m / Long jump / Shot put / High jump / 400m / 110m H / Discus / Pole vault / Javelin / 1500m					
20 km walk (road)						
50 km walk (road)						
4 × 100 m relay	41.1 h	Chad	17 August 1974		Quebec City, Canada	
4 × 400 m relay	3:14.9 h	Chad	8 July 1976		Libreville, Gabon	

=== Women ===
Event	Record	Athlete	Date	Meet	Place	Ref.
100 m	11.54 (+1.9 m/s)	Kaltouma Nadjina	24 May 2009	New Balance Athletics Series Meet #2	Calgary, Canada	
200 m	22.73 (+0.9 m/s)	Kaltouma Nadjina	23 June 2002		Edmonton, Canada	
300 m	36.10	Kaltouma Nadjina	19 August 2001		Gateshead, United Kingdom	
400 m	50.38	Kaltouma Nadjina	6 August 2001	World Championships	Edmonton, Canada	
800 m	2:08.04	Fraida Hassanatte	17 June 2025	5° Meeting Internazionale ATL-Etica - 4° Meeting del Talento giovanile Atl-Etica San Vendemiano	San Vendemiano, Italy	
1500 m	4:22.62+	Fraida Hassanatte	11 June 2022	Trofeo Donkenyarun	Milan, Italy	
Mile	4:42.65	Fraida Hassanatte	11 June 2022	Trofeo Donkenyarun	Milan, Italy	
3000 m	9:36.99	Fraida Hassanatte	28 May 2022	Memorial Davide Boroni	Brescia, Italy	
5000 m	17:32.71	Bibiro Ali Taher	23 June 2016	African Championships	Durban, South Africa	
5000 m	16:16.01	Fraida Hassanatte	27 April 2025	ESET WMD-Night	Busto Arsizio, Italy	
5 km (road)	16:57+	Fraida Hassanatte	23 March 2025	Stramilano Half Marathon	Milan, Italy	
10,000 m						
10 km (road)	34:43+	Fraida Hassanatte	23 March 2025	Stramilano Half Marathon	Milan, Italy	
15 km (road)	51:24+	Fraida Hassanatte	23 March 2025	Stramilano Half Marathon	Milan, Italy	
Half marathon	1:13:28	Fraida Hassanatte	23 March 2025	Stramilano Half Marathon	Milan, Italy	
20 km (road)	1:17:29+ Mx	Bibiro Ali Taher	7 December 2025	Valencia Marathon	Valencia, Spain	
25 km (road)	1:37:20+ Mx	Bibiro Ali Taher	7 December 2025	Valencia Marathon	Valencia, Spain	
30 km (road)	1:57:03+ Mx	Bibiro Ali Taher	7 December 2025	Valencia Marathon	Valencia, Spain	
Marathon	2:46:41 Mx	Bibiro Ali Taher	7 December 2025	Valencia Marathon	Valencia, Spain	
100 m hurdles						
400 m hurdles						
3000 m steeplechase						
High jump	1.60 m	Christine Koumnobégué Iyé	March 1991		N'Djamena, Chad	
Pole vault	1.80 m	Amina Mahamat	1 May 2003		Saint-Jean-de-Luz, France	
Long jump	5.20 m	Mariam Mahamat	5 February 1977		N'Djamena, Chad	
Triple jump	10.98 m	Haoua Nouta Mantangor	7 April 1996		N'Djamena, Chad	
Shot put	13.03 m	Patricia Bourmanda	1 May 1992		Saint-Brieuc, France	
Discus throw	43.50 m	Patricia Bourmanda	14 June 1992		Cesson, France	
Hammer throw	23.22 m	Amina Mahamat	16 May 2004		Mont-de-Marsan, France	
Javelin throw	22.10 m	Fatime Djimtoloum	9-15 April 2007		N'Djamena, Chad	
Heptathlon						
Heptathlon	100m H / High jump / Shot put / 200m / Long jump / Javelin / 800m					
20 km walk (road)						
4 × 100 m relay	48.88	Chad; Hinikissia Ndikert; Khadidja Ahmat; Blague Neloumta; Florence Dembert	1 May 2008	African Championships	Addis Ababa, Ethiopia	
4 × 400 m relay	4:01.4 h	Chad; A. Soula; Rosalie Bague Peng; Achta Yorassem; Neloumbeye	6 April 1996		N'Djamena, Chad	

== Indoor ==
=== Men ===
Event	Record	Athlete	Date	Meet	Place	Ref.
60 m	6.93	Docteur Awouride	12 February 2011	Meeting Interregional La Vienne	Vouneuil-sous-Biard, France	
200 m	22.07	Docteur Awouride	20 February 2011	Interregionaux	Val-de-Reuil, France	
400 m	47.99	Ali Faudet	1992		France	
800 m	1:52.61	Ousmane Ahamat Hassane	27 February 2010		Paris, France	
1500 m						
3000 m	8:39.49	Ahmat Abdou-Daoud	10 March 2007		San Sebastián, Spain	
60 m hurdles	8.97	Louis Magloire Ntankeu	28 January 2007		Nogent-sur-Oise, France	
High jump	2.14 m	François Béoring-Yan	31 January 1999		Paris, France	
Pole vault	2.00 m	Louis Magloire Ntankeu	18 November 2006		Amiens, France	
Long jump	5.50 m	Louis Magloire Ntankeu	13 December 2003		Nogent-sur-Oise, France	
Triple jump	11.01 m	Mahamat Senoussi	16 December 2007		Orléans, France	
Shot put	8.08 m	Louis Magloire Ntankeu	9 December 2006		Nogent-sur-Oise, France	
Heptathlon	2916 pts	Louis Magloire Ntankeu	9-10 December 2006		Nogent-sur-Oise, France	
Heptathlon	60m / Long jump / Shot put / High jump / 60m H / Pole vault / 1000m; 7.87 / 5.05 m / 8.08 m / 1.57 m / 9.06 / NM / 3:32.48					
5000 m walk						
4 × 400 m relay						

=== Women ===
Event	Record	Athlete	Date	Meet	Place	Ref.
60 m	7.50	Kaltouma Nadjina	10 February 2002		Edmonton, Canada	
200 m	23.68	Kaltouma Nadjina	5 February 2010		Saskatoon, Canada	
400 m	51.92	Kaltouma Nadjina	10 March 2001	World Championships	Lisbon, Portugal	
800 m	2:23.23	Achta Yorassem	7 March 1997	World Championships	Paris, France	
1500 m	5:17.30	Bibiro Ali Taher	14 February 2014		Val-de-Reuil, France	
3000 m	10:25.19	Bibiro Ali Taher	16 January 2016		Val-de-Reuil, France	
60 m hurdles						
High jump						
Pole vault	1.60 m	Amina Mahamat	18 February 2001		Bordeaux, France	
Long jump						
Triple jump	7.96 m	Amina Mahamat	18 February 2001		Bordeaux, France	
Shot put	13.07 m	Patricia Bourmanda	25 January 1992		Saint-Brieuc, France	
Pentathlon						
Pentathlon	60m H / High jump / Shot put / Long jump / 800m					
3000 m walk						
4 × 400 m relay						
