= Athletics at the 1981 Summer Universiade – Men's 200 metres =

The men's 200 metres event at the 1981 Summer Universiade was held at the Stadionul Naţional in Bucharest on 23, 24 and 25 July 1981.

== Medalists ==
Gold	Silver	Bronze
Yuriy Naumenko; Soviet Union	István Nagy; Hungary	Georges Kablan Degnan; Ivory Coast

== Results ==
=== Heats ===
Wind:
Heat 4: +1.5 m/s, Heat 5: +2.0 m/s

Rank	Heat	Athlete	Nationality	Time	Notes
1	5	Georges Kablan Degnan	Ivory Coast	20.94	Q
2	6	Boubacar Diallo	Senegal	21.01	Q
3	3	Théophile Nkounkou	Congo	21.02	Q
4	3	Yuriy Naumenko	Soviet Union	21.03	Q
5	5	Tomás González	Cuba	21.10	Q
6	2	Vladimir Muravyov	Soviet Union	21.11	Q
7	6	Giovanni Bongiorni	Italy	21.15	Q
8	6	Paulo Roberto Correia	Brazil	21.15	Q
9	5	Aldo Canti	France	21.16	Q
10	5	Jang Jae-keun	South Korea	21.18	q
11	4	Stéphane Adam	France	21.24	Q
12	6	Cameron Sharp	Great Britain	21.26	q
13	6	Dragan Zarić	Yugoslavia	21.32	q
14	3	István Nagy	Hungary	21.34	Q
15	4	Paul Narracott	Australia	21.37	Q
16	1	László Babály	Hungary	21.39	Q
17	4	Jesús Cabrera	Puerto Rico	21.40	Q
18	4	Matti Rusanen	Finland	21.47	q
19	5	Brahim Badi	Algeria	21.65	q
20	4	Leandro Peñalver	Cuba	21.70	q
21	3	Cornel Hapaianu	Romania	21.75	
22	5	Jesús Isasa	Spain	21.77	
23	1	Şükrü Çaprazlı	Turkey	21.80	Q
24	2	Hirohito Yamazaki	Japan	21.87	Q
25	3	Kazimierz Grubecki	Poland	21.88	
26	2	Kosmas Stratos	Greece	21.94	Q
27	5	Silvio Almanzar	Dominican Republic	22.00	
28	3	Sabidou Touré	Senegal	22.05	
29	1	Jorge Burgos	Mexico	22.06	Q
30	2	Murat Akman	Turkey	22.13	
31	1	Yoav Meckel	Israel	22.27	
32	4	Antoine Kiakouama	Congo	22.30	
33	2	Nabil Nahri	Syria	22.43	
34	4	Roland Dagher	Lebanon	22.58	
35	3	Jihad Salame	Lebanon	24.15	

=== Semifinals ===
Wind:
Heat 1: +0.9 m/s, Heat 2: +1.4 m/s, Heat 3: ? m/s

Rank	Heat	Athlete	Nationality	Time	Notes
1	2	István Nagy	Hungary	20.81	Q
2	2	Boubacar Diallo	Senegal	20.90	Q
3	1	Georges Kablan Degnan	Ivory Coast	20.91	Q
4	2	Paulo Roberto Correia	Brazil	20.99	q
4	3	Yuriy Naumenko	Soviet Union	20.99	Q
6	1	Vladimir Muravyov	Soviet Union	21.06	Q
7	3	Théophile Nkounkou	Congo	21.10	Q
8	3	László Babály	Hungary	21.14	q
9	3	Aldo Canti	France	21.16	
10	1	Cameron Sharp	Great Britain	21.19	
11	2	Tomás González	Cuba	21.21	
12	1	Giovanni Bongiorni	Italy	21.29	
13	2	Stéphane Adam	France	21.31	
14	2	Jesús Cabrera	Puerto Rico	21.44	
15	3	Jang Jae-keun	South Korea	21.49	
16	1	Dragan Zarić	Yugoslavia	21.54	
17	3	Paul Narracott	Australia	21.62	
18	1	Matti Rusanen	Finland	21.74	
19	1	Leandro Peñalver	Cuba	21.83	
20	3	Şükrü Çaprazlı	Turkey	21.86	
21	2	Brahim Badi	Algeria	21.89	
22	2	Kosmas Stratos	Greece	21.92	
23	1	Jorge Burgos	Mexico	22.57	
24	3	Hirohito Yamazaki	Japan	27.89	

=== Final ===
Wind: +0.4 m/s

Rank	Athlete	Nationality	Time	Notes
1st place, gold medalist(s)	Yuriy Naumenko	Soviet Union	20.79	
2nd place, silver medalist(s)	István Nagy	Hungary	20.83	
3rd place, bronze medalist(s)	Georges Kablan Degnan	Ivory Coast	20.97	
4	László Babály	Hungary	21.03	
5	Vladimir Muravyov	Soviet Union	21.08	
6	Boubacar Diallo	Senegal	21.08	
7	Théophile Nkounkou	Congo	21.25	
	Paulo Roberto Correia	Brazil	DNF	
