= Athletics at the 1981 Summer Universiade – Men's 3000 metres steeplechase =

The men's 3000 metres steeplechase event at the 1981 Summer Universiade was held at the Stadionul Naţional in Bucharest on 23 and 24 July 1981.

== Medalists ==
Gold	Silver	Bronze
John Gregorek; United States	Tommy Ekblom; Finland	Mariano Scartezzini; Italy

== Results ==
=== Heats ===
Rank	Heat	Athlete	Nationality	Time	Notes
1	1	Tommy Ekblom	Finland	8:35.16	Q
2	1	Giuseppe Gerbi	Italy	8:35.16	Q
3	1	Dan Betini	Romania	8:35.75	Q
4	2	Filippos Filippou	Greece	8:36.05	Q
5	1	Valeriy Gryaznov	Soviet Union	8:36.22	Q
6	1	John Gregorek	United States	8:37.52	Q
7	1	Panayot Kachanov	Bulgaria	8:38.02	Q
8	1	Tadasu Kawano	Japan	8:38.45	q
9	2	Masami Otsuka	Japan	8:39.44	Q
10	2	Nicolae Voicu	Romania	8:39.49	Q
11	2	Ivan Danu	Soviet Union	8:39.52	Q
12	2	Roger Hackney	Great Britain	8:40.05	Q
13	2	Mariano Scartezzini	Italy	8:40.31	Q
14	2	Francisco Silva	Mexico	8:46.64	q
15	2	Yehuda Tzadok	Israel	8:52.55	q
16	1	Sefa Het	Turkey	8:53.07	
17	1	Jorge Pitayo	Mexico	9:10.66	
18	1	Emmanuel Mpioh	Congo	9:12.09	
19	2	Nabil Chouéri	Lebanon	9:20.00	

=== Final ===
Rank	Athlete	Nationality	Time	Notes
1st place, gold medalist(s)	John Gregorek	United States	8:21.26	UR
2nd place, silver medalist(s)	Tommy Ekblom	Finland	8:21.93	
3rd place, bronze medalist(s)	Mariano Scartezzini	Italy	8:28.03	
4	Giuseppe Gerbi	Italy	8:29.07	
5	Valeriy Gryaznov	Soviet Union	8:29.61	
6	Ivan Danu	Soviet Union	8:29.63	
7	Nicolae Voicu	Romania	8:30.14	
8	Panayot Kachanov	Bulgaria	8:35.10	
9	Filippos Filippou	Greece	8:37.57	
10	Masami Otsuka	Japan	8:39.11	
11	Tadasu Kawano	Japan	8:39.24	
12	Dan Betini	Romania	8:41.46	
13	Roger Hackney	Great Britain	8:57.68	
14	Yehuda Tzadok	Israel	8:58.27	
15	Francisco Silva	Mexico	9:04.88	
