= Antoine Kiakouama =

Congolese sprinter

Personal information
- Full name: Pierre Antoine Kiakouama
- Nationality: Congolese
- Born: 15 July 1953 (age 73)
- Height: 167 cm (5 ft 6 in)
- Weight: 58 kg (128 lb)

Sport
- Sport: Sprinting
- Event: 100 metres
Medal record
Men's athletics
Representing the Republic of the Congo
African Games
Bronze medal – third place	1978 Algiers	4 × 100 m relay
Central African Championships
Gold medal – first place	1980 Brazzaville	100 m
Gold medal – first place	1980 Brazzaville	200 m
Central African Games
Silver medal – second place	1981 Luanda	Long jump

Antoine Kiakouama (born 15 July 1953) is a Congolese sprinter. He competed in the men's 100 metres and 4 × 100 metres relay at the 1980 Summer Olympics and the 200 metres and 4 × 100 metres relay at the 1984 Summer Olympics.

== Career ==
In 1972, Kiakouama set his 100 metres personal best of 10.4 seconds.

Kiakouama represented the Republic of the Congo at the 1977 World University Games, qualifying in the 100 metres. He finished 5th in his heat, running 10.80 seconds and failing to advance to the semi-finals.

At the 1978 African Games, Kiakouama entered in the 4 × 100 m. He anchored the Congolese team to the bronze medal, running 39.79 seconds behind Ghana and Nigeria.

He returned at the 1979 World University Games in Mexico City, where he competed in the long jump and 4 × 100 m. In the long jump, Kiakouama jumped 6.55 metres in qualification to place 23rd and did not advance to the finals. In the 4 × 100 m, Kiakouama ran on his team to win their semi-final in 39.54 seconds, qualifying for the finals where they placed 7th in 40.74 seconds.

Kiakouama was selected to compete in the 100 m and 4 × 100 m at the 1980 Summer Olympics. He ran 10.69 seconds for 4th in the 6th 100 metres heat, failing to automatically advance by one place and 0.04 seconds. In the 4 × 100 m relay, Kiakouama anchored the Congolese team to finish 7th in their heat in 40.09 seconds. Also that year at the Central African Athletics Championships, Kiakouama won gold medals in both the 100 m and 200 m in times of 10.5 and 22.0 seconds respectively. His 100 metres time was an all-time championship record.

Kiakouama competed in the 1981 World University Games 200 metres, where he placed 6th in his heat in 22.30 seconds and did not advance to the finals. Later that year at the 1981 Central African Games in Luanda, he won a silver medal in the long jump with a 7.02 metres best mark.

Kiakouama led off the Congolese team at the 1983 World University Games 4 × 100 metres relay. They ran 41.67 seconds to place 6th in their heat, failing to advance to the finals.

At the 1984 Summer Olympics, Kiakouama was selected to compete in both the 200 m and 4 × 100 m relay. He failed to advance in the 200 m, running a personal best 21.64 for 7th in his heat. In the 4 × 100 m, Kiakouama ran 3rd leg for the Congolese team that finished 6th in their heat in 40.74 seconds, failing to advance.

== Personal life ==
Kiakouama is also a Senegalese citizen. He studied at the University of Burgundy Europe in Dijon, France. At the 1984 Olympics, Kiakouama said in French that if the African athletes had the same means that American athletes had, they would perform much better.
