= Alphonse Mandonda =

Congolese middle-distance runner

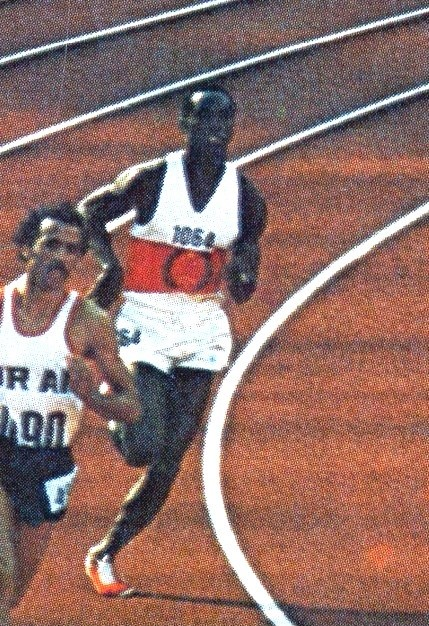

Personal information
- Nationality: Congolese
- Born: 5 December 1950 (age 75)

Sport
- Sport: Middle-distance running
- Event: 800 metres
Medal record
Men's athletics
Representing the Republic of the Congo
Central African Championships
Gold medal – first place	1975 Yaounde	400 m
Central African Games
Bronze medal – third place	1976 Libreville	400 m

Alphonse Mandonda (born 5 December 1950) is a Congolese middle-distance runner. He competed in the men's 800 metres at the 1972 Summer Olympics.

Mandonda was the flag bearer for the Republic of Congo at the 1972 Summer Olympics Parade of Nations. At the 1972 Games, he ran 1:51.17 to finish 7th in his heat, failing to advance.

Over the following decade, Mandonda would represent the Congo internationally at several high-level competitions. At the 1973 World University Games, Mandonda finished 5th in his 400 m heat. He won his first international gold medal at the 1975 Central African Athletics Championships, winning the 400 m there.

Mandonda also won 400 m bronze at the 1976 Central African Games. He returned to World University Games competition at the 1977 edition, placing 4th in his heat, before advancing to the semi-finals at the 1981 World University Games 400 m. Mandonda would also compete in the 4 × 400 m relay at the 1981 and 1983 World University Games, setting a Republic of the Congo record of 3:11.28 during his 1981 performance.
