= Emmanuel M'Pioh =

Congolese long-distance runner

Personal information
- Nationality: Congolese
- Born: 24 May 1952 (age 74)

Sport
- Sport: Long-distance running
- Event: Marathon
Medal record
Men's athletics
Representing the Republic of the Congo
Central African Championships
| Gold medal – first place | 1980 Brazzaville | 3000 m s'chase |
Central African Games
| Silver medal – second place | 1976 Libreville | 3000 m s'chase |
| Gold medal – first place | 1981 Luanda | 3000 m s'chase |

Emmanuel M'Pioh (born 24 May 1952) is a Congolese long-distance runner. He competed in the marathon at the 1980 Summer Olympics and the 3000 metres steeplechase at the 1984 Summer Olympics.

M'Pioh began his career as a 3000 metres steeplechase runner. He qualified for his first global championship in 1973, running the at the steeplechase at the Moscow World University Games. He finished 7th in the second heat, just one place away from qualifying for the finals.

At the 1976 Central African Games, M'Pioh won his first international medal, placing 2nd in the steeplechase.

In 1980, M'Pioh won the 3rd Central African Athletics Championships in the steeplechase with a 9:34.5 time. He qualified for his first Olympic Games later that year, running the marathon in 2:48:17 hours for 52nd place.

The following year, he won his second gold medal at the 1981 Central African Games in Luanda, improving his 3000 m steeplechase time to 9:20.3. He also competed at the 1981 World University Games steeplechase, placing 10th in his heat.

In June 1984, M'Pioh ran 8:30.25 for the flat 3000 metres at a meeting in Paris, setting a new Congolese record over the distance. M'Pioh became a two-time Olympian at the 1984 Summer Olympics, this time competing in the steeplechase. He ran 9:05.58 to place 11th in his heat, failing to advance but setting another Congolese record.

In 2004, Mpio was the vice president of the organizing committee for the African Championships in Athletics. He presented the logo and mascot of an antelope for the 2004 African Championships in Athletics.

In 2005, Mpio served as the president of the Congolese Athletics Association. As president, he was responsible for hosting and organizing the first official Congolese Athletics Championships in more than ten years in October 2005.

In 2007, M'Pioh was selected to head the Development and Competitions Commission division of the Confederation of African Athletics. He was re-elected in 2011. He was awarded an IAAF Veteran Pin at the IAAF Congress meeting that year. M'Pioh also served for the Congolese National Olympic and Sports Committee to progress Olympic sports in the country.
