= Médard Makanga =

Congolese sprinter

Personal information
- Nationality: Congolese
- Born: 8 May 1967 (age 59)

Sport
- Sport: Sprinting
- Event: 200 metres
Medal record
Men's athletics
Representing the Republic of the Congo
Central African Championships
Silver medal – second place	1995 Yaounde	4 × 400 m relay
Gold medal – first place	1995 Yaounde	400 m hurdles
Gold medal – first place	1995 Yaounde	400 m
Gold medal – first place	1999 Garoua	400 m
Gold medal – first place	1999 Garoua	400 m hurdles
Gold medal – first place	1999 Garoua	4 × 400 m relay

Médard Makanga (born 8 May 1967) is a Congolese sprinter and hurdler. He won five gold medals at the Central African Athletics Championships and set the Congolese 400 metres hurdles national record. He also competed in the men's 200 metres, 400 metres, and 4 × 100 metres relay at the 1992 Summer Olympics.

== Career ==
Makanga entered in three events at the 1992 Olympics. In the 200 metres, he ran 22.18 seconds to place 7th in the first heat and did not advance. In the 400 m, he placed 6th in his heat with a 48.17-second time. He led off for the Congolese Olympic 4 × 100 m team in their heat, but the team was disqualified. At a separate meeting in 1992, Makanga set his 200 metres personal best of 21.9 seconds.

Makanga qualified in the 400 metres at the 1994 Francophone Games. He placed 3rd in his heat to advance to the semi-finals, running 48.14 seconds. In the first semi-final, he ran 48.34 seconds to place 7th and did not qualify for the finals.

At the 1995 Central African Athletics Championships, Makanga won medals in three events. He won the 400 metres in 46.6 seconds, the 400 metres hurdles in 52.5 seconds, and anchored the Congolese 4 × 400 m relay team to a silver medal in 3:13.8 minutes. His 400 m hurdles time set a new all-time championship record, and his 400 metres time was a personal best. Later that year, he competed in the 400 metres at the 1995 World Athletics Championships. He ran 47.38 seconds to place 8th in his heat and did not advance.

Four years later, he competed in the same three events at the 1999 Central African Athletics Championships in Garoua. He won gold medals in all three, running hand times of 52.3 for 400 m hurdles, 48.1 for 400 m, and 3:14.4 anchoring the relay. His 400 m hurdles time broke his own championship record. Makanga competed in the 400 metres hurdles at the 1999 All-Africa Games, running 52.60 seconds auto-timed to place 6th in his heat. His time set a Republic of the Congo national record which was not broken until 2023.

== Personal life ==
After retiring from competition, Makanga moved to Montreal, Canada in order to have more opportunities for his family.

He later became a coach, training sprinters in Laval, Quebec.

His son Meddy Makanga is a celebrity barber. Meddy was raised in Pointe-Noire and Brazzaville but moved to Canada at age 14 four years after Médard had moved there. Médard initially styled his son's hair but Meddy was not satisfied, leading him to become a barber. After Meddy appeared in the credits for Transformers: Rise of the Beasts for styling its star Anthony Ramos, he said to his father that their last name would be recorded in history, but Médard said that was already accomplished for being an Olympic athlete.
