= Athletics at the 1973 Summer Universiade – Men's 3000 metres steeplechase =

The men's 3000 metres steeplechase event at the 1973 Summer Universiade was held at the Central Lenin Stadium in Moscow on 17 and 19 August.

== Medalists ==
Gold	Silver	Bronze
Leonid Savelyev; Soviet Union	Michael Karst; West Germany	Jan Kondzior; Poland

== Results ==
=== Heats ===
Rank	Heat	Athlete	Nationality	Time	Notes
1	1	Boualem Rahoui	Algeria	8:40.8	Q
2	1	Kazimierz Maranda	Poland	8:43.6	Q
3	1	Leonid Savelyev	Soviet Union	8:45.2	Q
4	1	Doug Brown	United States	8:46.6	Q
5	1	František Tempír	Czechoslovakia	8:46.8	q
6	1	Elek Sári	Hungary	8:59.0	q
7	1	David Bitarinsaah	Uganda	9:22.6	
8	1	Alfredo Palomares	Mexico	9:25.8	
1	2	Nikolay Mayorov	Soviet Union	8:44.2	Q
2	2	Jan Kondzior	Poland	8:44.4	Q
3	2	Michael Karst	West Germany	8:47.6	Q
4	2	Bill Lucas	United States	8:47.6	Q
5	2	Mihály Tóth	Hungary	8:48.6	q
6	2	Carlos Báez	Puerto Rico	9:11.0	q
7	2	Emmanuel Mpioh	Congo	10:01.6	
8	2	Manuel Izaguirre	Honduras	10:20.0	
	2	Franco Fava	Italy	DNF	

=== Final ===
Rank	Athlete	Nationality	Time	Notes
1st place, gold medalist(s)	Leonid Savelyev	Soviet Union	8:26.49	
2nd place, silver medalist(s)	Michael Karst	West Germany	8:28.32	
3rd place, bronze medalist(s)	Jan Kondzior	Poland	8:28.66	
4	Boualem Rahoui	Algeria	8:29.46	
5	Kazimierz Maranda	Poland	8:29.58	
6	Nikolay Mayorov	Soviet Union	8:31.85	
7	Doug Brown	United States	8:38.2	
8	Bill Lucas	United States	8:43.2	
9	František Tempír	Czechoslovakia	8:44.0	
10	Elek Sári	Hungary	8:51.4	
11	Mihály Tóth	Hungary	9:03.0	
12	Carlos Báez	Puerto Rico	9:16.4	
