= Athletics at the Central African Games =

Previous sports at the Central African Games

Athletics was one of the sports at the Central African Games, and featured on the programme at all three editions of the competition, in 1976, 1981 and 1987.

== Editions ==
=== Precursor games ===
==== Jeux de la Coupe des Tropiques ====
Edition	Year	Venue	City	Country	Events
I	1962		Bangui	Central African Rep.	
II	1964		Yaoundé	Cameroon	

==== Coupe d'Afrique Centrale ====
Edition	Year	Venue	City	Country	Events
I	1972		Brazzaville	Congo	
II	1974		N'Djamena	Chad	Cancelled

=== Central African Games ===
Edition	Year	Venue	City	Country	Events
I	1976	Stade Omar Bongo	Libreville	Gabon	31
II	1981		Luanda	Angola	34
III	1987	Stade Alphonse Massemba-Débat	Brazzaville	Republic of the Congo	36
