= António dos Santos (athlete) =

Angolan athlete

António Santos
Personal information
- Full name: António Dias dos Santos
- Nationality: Angolan
- Born: 3 September 1964 (age 61)

Sport
- Sport: Athletics
- Events: Long jump, triple jump

António Dias dos Santos (born 3 September 1964) is an Angolan long jumper and triple jumper.

At the 1987 Central African Games he won the gold medal in the triple jump and the silver medal in the long jump. At the 1988 African Championships he won the gold medal in the triple jump.

He also competed in the triple jump at the 1988 Summer Olympics, the 1991 World Indoor Championships and the 1992 Summer Olympics without reaching the final. He also competed in long jump at the 1987 World Championships and the 1991 World Indoor Championships without reaching the final.

His personal best triple jump was 16.43 metres, achieved in 1988.
