= Johannes Kardiono =

Indonesian sprinter

Personal information
- Nationality: Indonesian
- Born: 25 December 1963 (age 62) Sragen Regency, Indonesia

Sport
- Sport: Sprinting
- Events: 100 metres, 4 × 100 metres relay

Johannes Kardiono (born 25 December 1963) is an Indonesian sprinter. He competed in the men's 4 × 100 metres relay at the 1984 Summer Olympics.

At the 1983 Summer Universiade in Edmonton he competed in the 100 metres. His time in Heat 1 was 11.10 and he did not qualify for Quarterfinals. At the 1983 Summer Universiade he also competed in the 4 x 100 metres relay. Indonesian team ran in Heat 2 and didn't qualify with time 41.29 for Final.
