= Gilles Anthony Afoumba =

Congolese sprinter (born 1996)

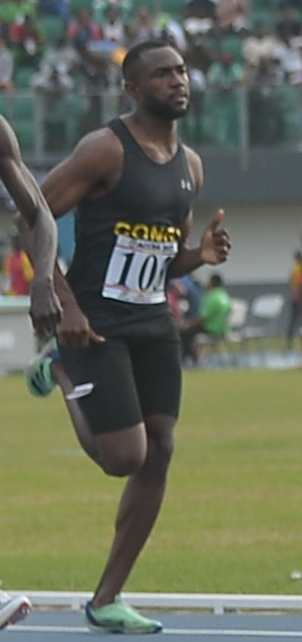
- Gilles Anthony Afoumba in 2024

Personal information
- Born: 14 June 1996 (age 30)

Sport
- Sport: Athletics
- Event: 400 m

Achievements and titles
- Personal bests: 400m: 45.64s (Montgeron, 2019) NR; Indoors; 400m 46.68s (Reims, 2020) NR

Gilles Anthony Afoumba (born 14 June 1996) is a sprinter from the Republic of the Congo, based in France. He set a Congolese national record for the 400 metres in 2019 and competed at the 2020 Olympic Games.

== Early life ==
He grew up in Brazzaville and was a keen footballer in his youth, before focusing on athletics.

== Career ==
He moved to train in France in 2015. That year, he won bronze over 200 metres at the 2015 African Junior Athletics Championships, in Addis Ababa.

In 2019, he set a new Congolese national record by running 400 meters in 45.64 seconds. In August 2019, he finished fourth at that distance at the 2019 African Games in Rabat.

Afoumba set a Congolese national indoor record over 400 metres of 46.68 seconds in Reims in February 2020. He competed in the delayed 2020 Summer Olympics in Tokyo, in 2021, in the men's 400 metres.

== Personal life ==
In 2022, due to a lack of funding, he had to supplement his income by working as a store manager for a Carrefour supermarket in Noisy-le-Grand, Seine-Saint-Denis, France, after an Olympic scholarship fell-through.
