= Suzie Tanefo =

Cameroonian athlete (born 1969)

Personal information
- Nationality: Cameroonian
- Born: 22 May 1969 (age 57)

Sport
- Sport: Sprinting
- Event: 400 metres

Suzie Tanefo (born 22 May 1969) is a retired Cameroonian sprinter who specialized in the 400 metres.

Tanefo competed for the Howard Bison track and field team in the NCAA.

At the 1987 Central African Games she won the silver medals in both 200 and 400 metres. She also competed at the 1991 World Championships and the 1992 Summer Olympics without reaching the final.

Her personal best time was 52.88 seconds, achieved in 1989.
