= Carlos Báez (athlete) =

Puerto Rican middle-distance runner

Personal information
- Full name: Carlos Báez Guzmán
- Nationality: Puerto Rican
- Born: 22 May 1948 (age 77) Villalba, Puerto Rico
- Height: 1.70 m (5 ft 7 in)
- Weight: 57 kg (126 lb)

Sport
- Sport: Middle-distance running
- Event: 800 metres

Carlos Báez Guzmán (born 22 May 1948) is a Puerto Rican middle-distance runner. He competed in the men's 800 metres at the 1968 Summer Olympics.

== Personal bests ==
- 800 metres – 1:50.8 (1973)

== International competitions ==
Year	Competition	Venue	Position	Event	Notes
Representing Puerto Rico
1968	Olympic Games	Mexico City, Mexico	34th (h)	800 m	1:52.6
1969	Central American and Caribbean Championships	Havana, Cuba	3rd	5000 m	15:37.0
1970	Central American and Caribbean Games	Panama City, Panama	4th	1500 m	3:48.3
1970	Central American and Caribbean Games	Panama City, Panama	9th	3000 m s'chase	NT
1973	Central American and Caribbean Championships	Maracaibo, Venezuela	4th	800 m	1:50.8
1973	Central American and Caribbean Championships	Maracaibo, Venezuela	3rd	1500 m	3:47.6
1973	Central American and Caribbean Championships	Maracaibo, Venezuela	4th	3000 m s'chase	9:05.1
1973	Universiade	Moscow, Soviet Union	12th	3000 m s'chase	9:16.4
1974	Central American and Caribbean Games	Santo Domingo, Dominican Republic	5th	1500 m	3:47.01
1974	Central American and Caribbean Games	Santo Domingo, Dominican Republic	–	3000 m s'chase	DNF
1975	Central American and Caribbean Championships	Ponce, Puerto Rico	3rd	3000 m s'chase	9:35.0
1975	Pan American Games	Mexico City, Mexico	7th	1500 m	3:54.81
1978	Central American and Caribbean Games	Medellín, Colombia	7th	1500 m	3:56.49
1978	Central American and Caribbean Games	Medellín, Colombia	10th	3000 m s'chase	9:41.28
