= Athletics at the 1983 Summer Universiade – Men's 4 × 100 metres relay =

The men's 4 × 100 metres relay event at the 1983 Summer Universiade was held at the Commonwealth Stadium in Edmonton on 10 and 11 July 1983.

== Results ==
=== Heats ===
Rank	Heat	Nation	Athletes	Time	Notes
1	2	United States	Terry Scott, Sam Graddy, Ken Robinson, Willie Gault	39.17	Q
2	1	Canada	Desai Williams, Sterling Hinds, Tony Sharpe, Ben Johnson	39.30	Q
3	2	Soviet Union	Andrey Prokofyev, Nikolay Sidorov, Vladimir Muravyov, Aleksandr Zolotaryev	39.33	Q
4	2	France	Thierry François, Denis Favrot, Gabriel Brothier, Stéphane Adam	39.58	Q
5	1	Japan	Yoshihiro Shimizu, Hideyuki Arikawa, Koichi Mishiba, Susumu Takano	39.91	Q
6	1	Nigeria	Timothy Arinze, Chidi Imoh, Victor Okon, Yusuf Alli	39.92	Q
7	2	West Germany	Fritz-Werner Heer, Thomas Geuyen, Peter Volmer, Alex Schaumann	40.17	q
8	1	Italy	Franco Lazzer, Franco Zucchini, Emilio Moltrasio, Giovanni Bongiorni	40.21	q
9	1	Ivory Coast	Otokpa Kouadio, Ouattara Lagazane, Gabriel Tiacoh, Barthélemy Koffi	40.86	
10	2	Indonesia	Herman Mandangi, Julius Afaar, Johannes Kardiono, Mohamed Purnomo	41.29	
11	2	Congo	Antoine Nkounkou, Antoine Kiakouama, Mboula Mboula, Henri Ndinga	41.67	

=== Final ===
Rank	Nation	Athletes	Time	Notes
1st place, gold medalist(s)	United States	Terry Scott, Sam Graddy, Ken Robinson, Willie Gault	38.50	
2nd place, silver medalist(s)	Canada	Desai Williams, Sterling Hinds, Tony Sharpe, Ben Johnson	38.69	
3rd place, bronze medalist(s)	Soviet Union	Andrey Prokofyev, Nikolay Sidorov, Vladimir Muravyov, Aleksandr Zolotaryev	39.04	
4	France	Thierry François, Denis Favrot, Gabriel Brothier, Stéphane Adam	39.46	
5	Italy	Franco Lazzer, Franco Zucchini, Emilio Moltrasio, Giovanni Bongiorni	39.74	
6	Nigeria	Timothy Arinze, Chidi Imoh, Victor Okon, Yusuf Alli	39.79	
7	Japan	Yoshihiro Shimizu, Hideyuki Arikawa, Koichi Mishiba, Susumu Takano	39.90	
8	West Germany	Fritz-Werner Heer, Peter Volmer, Alex Schaumann, Uwe Fegert	40.15	
