= Daphrose Nyiramutuzo =

Rwandan middle-distance runner

Personal information
- Nationality: Rwandan
- Born: 1 September 1972 (age 53)

Sport
- Sport: Middle-distance running
- Events: 1500 metres and 3000 metres

Daphrose Nyiramutuzo (born 1 September 1972) is a Rwandan middle-distance runner.

== Career ==
In 1987, Nyiramutuzo competed at the Central African Games in Brazzaville, Republic of the Congo, winning a silver medal in the women's 1500 metres race with a time of 4:38.5.

Nyiramutuzo also competed in the women's 1500 metres and the women's 3000 metres at the 1988 Summer Olympics in Seoul, South Korea.
