= Bill Lucas (runner) =

British long-distance runner and RAF officer (1917–2018)

- Born: William Ernest Lucas; 16 January 1917; Tooting, London, England
- Died: 24 March 2018 (aged 101); Cowfold, West Sussex, England
- Military career
- Allegiance: United Kingdom
- Branch: Royal Air Force
- Service years: 1940–1945
- Rank: Squadron Leader
- Service number: 122826
- Units: No. 9 Squadron RAF; No. 15 Squadron RAF; No. 162 Squadron RAF
- Conflicts: Second World War: Operation Millennium
- Awards: DFC; Mentioned in Despatches
- Other work: Olympian (1948 Summer Olympics)

William Ernest Lucas DFC (16 January 1917 – 24 March 2018) was a British RAF officer and long-distance runner who competed in the 1948 Summer Olympics. In 2017, Lucas was noted for having been Britain's oldest living Olympian.

== Early life ==
Lucas was born in London, the only child of a bricklayer who had served as a sergeant with the Northamptonshire Regiment during the First World War and had received the Military Medal. After leaving grammar school at 15 in 1932, he worked in London at several jobs, as a packer for a trading house, a clerk for a publisher and as an assessor for an insurance company.

== Military career ==
When war was declared in 1939, Lucas chose to serve in the Royal Air Force, joining the RAFVR in 1940. After a period of training at RAF Burnaston, he made his first solo flight in a Miles Magister, and after advanced flight training received his wings as a fighter pilot. After victory in the Battle of Britain made the induction of further pilots in the fighter stream unnecessary, Lucas was posted to RAF Lossiemouth in Scotland for further training as a bomber pilot on Vickers Wellingtons. In August 1941 Lucas, now a sergeant pilot, was assigned to No. 9 Squadron RAF, then stationed at RAF Honington. After flying on three bombing missions over Germany, Lucas was assigned his own crew, flying a further 14 missions. He was then requested to take a conversion course in order to fly larger four-engined Short Stirling bombers. After completing the course, Lucas transferred to No. 15 Squadron RAF at RAF Wyton, flying another 26 missions over Europe through mid-1942. By now a flight sergeant, Lucas received an emergency commission as a pilot officer (on probation) on 1 May 1942, with seniority from 11 May. He participated in the Allies' first 1000-bomber raid over Cologne on 30 May.

On 9 November 1942, Lucas was promoted to war-substantive flying officer (on probation). Following his first tour, Lucas was again posted to Scotland through late 1944, receiving a promotion to war-substantive flight lieutenant on 11 May 1944. In Scotland, he served as an instructor with No. 19 Operational Training Unit at RAF Kinloss. While there, he met a fellow instructor, Wing Commander Hamish Mahaddie, as a result of which Lucas soon joined the Pathfinder Force in October 1944.

For the remainder of the war, Lucas served with the Pathfinder Force, earning a mention in despatches in January 1945 and receiving the DFC in July. He left the RAF after the end of the war, with the rank of squadron leader.

== Running career ==
Lucas returned from the military in 1946 and worked in insurance while raising a family. When the 1948 Olympics came, he had trained only lightly for a limited period and failed to qualify for the final of the 5000 metres race. In reflection of his career, Lucas recalled: "The biggest regret of my career is my lost Olympic years of 1940 and 1944" in 2008.

Lucas ran for Britain in various internationals, won numerous Surrey titles and won a huge number of medals in the London to Brighton Relay for his club, Belgrave Harriers.

Despite all his racing, Lucas never gained any income from the sport and he retired in 1954. Years later, he made a brief comeback as a veteran and found himself racing Sydney Wooderson in a 100 x one mile relay. In 2017, Lucas was recognized as Britain's oldest living Olympian.

== Death ==
Lucas lived in Cowfold, West Sussex, with his wife, Sheena. He died on 24 March 2018 at the age of 101.

== See also ==
- List of centenarians (sportspeople)
