= Bernardo Manuel =

Angolan athlete

Personal information
- Nationality: Angolan
- Born: 27 December 1954 (age 71)

Sport
- Sport: Long-distance running
- Event: 5000 metres

Bernardo Manuel (born 27 December 1954) is an Angolan long-distance runner. He competed in the men's 5000 metres at the 1980 Summer Olympics.
