= László Babály Sr. =

Hungarian sprinter

Personal information
- Nationality: Hungarian
- Born: 14 March 1957 (age 69) Nyírlugos, Szabolcs-Szatmár-Bereg County, Hungary

Sport
- Sport: Sprinting
- Event: 4 × 100 metres relay

László Babály Sr. (born 14 March 1957) is a Hungarian sprinter. He competed in the men's 4 × 100 metres relay at the 1980 Summer Olympics. His son also represented Hungary in the 4 × 100 metres relay at the 2000 Summer Olympics.
