= 2025 Valencia Marathon =

Race in Valencia, Spain

45th Valencia Marathon
- Venue: Valencia, Spain
- Date: December 7, 2025

Champions
- Men: John Korir (KEN) (2:02:24)
- Women: Joyciline Jepkosgei (KEN) (2:14:00)

The 2025 Valencia Marathon was an Elite Platinum Label marathon race held in Valencia, Spain on December 7, 2025. It was the 45th running of the race and was the first time the marathon recorded over 30,000 finishers with 30,777 runners completing the race.

== Results ==
Kenyan runner John Korir won the men's race running a personal best of 2:02:24. Three national records were broken on the men's side with Amanal Petros placing second with a time of 2:04:03 to set a new German national record, Awet Nftalem Kibrab finishing third in 2:04:24 to set the Norwegian record, and Suguru Osako finishing fourth in 2:04:55 and setting a new Japanese record.

On the women's side, Joyciline Jepkosgei dropped Peres Jepchirchir with around three kilometers remaining to take the victory. Both ran personal bests of 2:14:00 and 2:14:43 respectively which made them the 4th and 7th fastest women of all time at this distance. Three national records were broken in the women's race as well with third place finisher Chloé Herbiet breaking the Belgian national record in 2:20:38, fourth place finisher Alisa Vainio breaking the Finnish national record in 2:20:48, and fifth place finisher Jessica Stenson breaking the Australian national record with a time of 2:21:24.

Elite men's top 10 finishers
Place	Athlete	Nationality	Time
1st place, gold medalist(s)	John Korir	Kenya	2:02:24
2nd place, silver medalist(s)	Amanal Petros	Germany	2:04:03
3rd place, bronze medalist(s)	Awet Nftalem Kibrab	Norway	2:04:24
4	Suguru Osako	Japan	2:04:55
5	Gashau Ayale	Israel	2:05:29
6	Justus Kangogo	Kenya	2:06:10
7	Alex Yee	United Kingdom	2:06:38
8	Félix Bour	France	2:06:41
9	Filmon Tesfu	Ethiopia	2:06:42
10	Gemechu Dida	Ethiopia	2:06:45

Elite women's top 10 finishers
Place	Athlete	Nationality	Time
1st place, gold medalist(s)	Joyciline Jepkosgei	Kenya	2:14:00
2nd place, silver medalist(s)	Peres Jepchirchir	Kenya	2:14:43
3rd place, bronze medalist(s)	Chloé Herbiet	Belgium	2:20:38
4	Alisa Vainio	Finland	2:20:48
5	Jessica Stenson	Australia	2:21:24
6	Glenrose Xaba	South Africa	2:23:22
7	Isobel Batt-Doyle	Australia	2:23:35
8	Lonah Chemtai Salpeter	Israel	2:23:45
9	Meritxell Soler	Spain	2:23:49
10	Natasha Wilson	United Kingdom	2:24:21
