= Orders, decorations, and medals of the Republic of the Congo =

The orders, decorations, and medals of the Republic of the Congo summarizes the different orders of the Republic of the Congo. The Grand Chancellery of National Orders is the body responsible for managing honorary distinctions, coats of arms, and national flags and standards. Administratively, it falls under the military household of the President of the Republic, Grand Master of the National Orders.

== Military orders ==
Ribbon	Order	Foundation	Country	Observations
	Congolese Order of Merit	25 February 1959	Republic of Congo	5 ranks and 2 dignities
	Military Cross of Bravery		Republic of Congo	
	Military Valour Cross		Republic of Congo	
	Medal of Honour for the Wounded, the Mutilated and War Victims		Republic of Congo	
	Police Medal of Honour	27 June 1961	Republic of Congo	Only one grade.
	Order of Companion of the Revolution		People's Republic of the Congo	No longer distributed since 10

== Civil orders ==
Ribbon	Order	Characteristic	Foundation	Country	Observations
	Order of Congolese Devotion	Civil Merit	July 28, 1960	Republic of Congo	Order awarded for merit in the fields of administration, politics, economics, social affairs and culture, and for courage and devotion in the defense of national interests. Comes in 5 classes.
	Medal of Honour for the Legal Professions	Civil Merit		Republic of Congo	3 classes (Gold, Silver and Bronze)
	Medal of Honour	Civil Merit	July 28, 1960	Republic of Congo	3 classes. Awarded twice a year: on International Workers' Day and on 28 novembre(National Day). Ration: 70% (Bronze); 25% (Silver) and 5% (Gold)
	Medal of Honour for Scientific and Technological Research	Civil Merit		Republic of Congo	3 classes
	Public Health Medal of Honour	Civil Merit	June 16, 1964	Republic of Congo	3 classes.
	Order of Agricultural Merit	Civil Merit		Republic of Congo	3 classes.
	Order of Sporting Merit	Civil Merit		Republic of Congo	3 classes
	National Order of Peace	Civil Merit		Republic of Congo	5 classes

== See also ==
- Orders, decorations, and medals of the Democratic Republic of the Congo
