= Jeanne-Nicole Ngo Minyemeck =

Cameroonian athlete

Personal information
- Nationality: Cameroonian
- Born: 18 August 1969 (age 56)

Sport
- Sport: Athletics
- Events: Shot put Discus

Jeanne-Nicole Ngo Minyemeck (born 18 August 1969) is a Cameroonian athlete. She competed in the women's shot put and the women's discus throw at the 1988 Summer Olympics.
