= Nicolae Voicu =

Romanian middle-distance runner

Personal information
- Nationality: Romanian
- Born: 23 November 1955 (age 70) Galați, Romania

Sport
- Sport: Middle-distance running
- Event: Steeplechase

Nicolae Voicu (born 23 November 1955) is a Romanian middle-distance runner. He competed in the men's 3000 metres steeplechase at the 1980 Summer Olympics.
