= Ruth Enang Mesode =

Cameroonian sprinter (born 1958)

Personal information
- Nationality: Cameroonian
- Born: 24 February 1958 (age 68)

Sport
- Sport: Sprinting
- Event: 100 metres
Medal record
Women's athletics
Representing Cameroon
African Championships
Bronze medal – third place	1982 Cairo	200 m

Ruth Enang Mesode (born 24 February 1958) is a Cameroonian former sprinter. She competed in the 100 metres at the 1980 Summer Olympics and the 1984 Summer Olympics.
