= Cécile Ngambi =

Cameroonian heptathlete (born 1960)

Personal information
- Born: 15 November 1960 (age 65)
Medal record
Women's athletics
Representing Cameroon
African Championships
Silver medal – second place	1985 Cairo	100 m hurdles

Cécile Ngambi (born 15 November 1960) is a retired Cameroonian heptathlete. She was the first woman to represent Cameroon at the Olympics.

She competed in pentathlon at the 1980 Summer Olympics and 100 metres at the 1984 Summer Olympics. She won the silver medal in 100 metres hurdles at the 1985 African Championships. Ngambi was the flag bearer for Cameroon in the 2000 Summer Olympics opening ceremony.

Olympic Games
Preceded by Georgette N'Koma	Flagbearer for Cameroon; Sydney 2000	Succeeded by Isaac Menyoli
