= Jean-Pierre Abossolo-Ze =

Cameroonian sprinter

Personal information
- Nationality: Cameroonian
- Born: 18 December 1956 (age 69)

Sport
- Sport: Sprinting
- Event: 4 × 400 metres relay

Jean-Pierre Abossolo-Ze (born 18 December 1956) is a Cameroonian former sprinter. He competed in the men's 4 × 400 metres relay at the 1984 Summer Olympics.
