= 1987 Central African Games =

International multi-sport event

III Central African Games
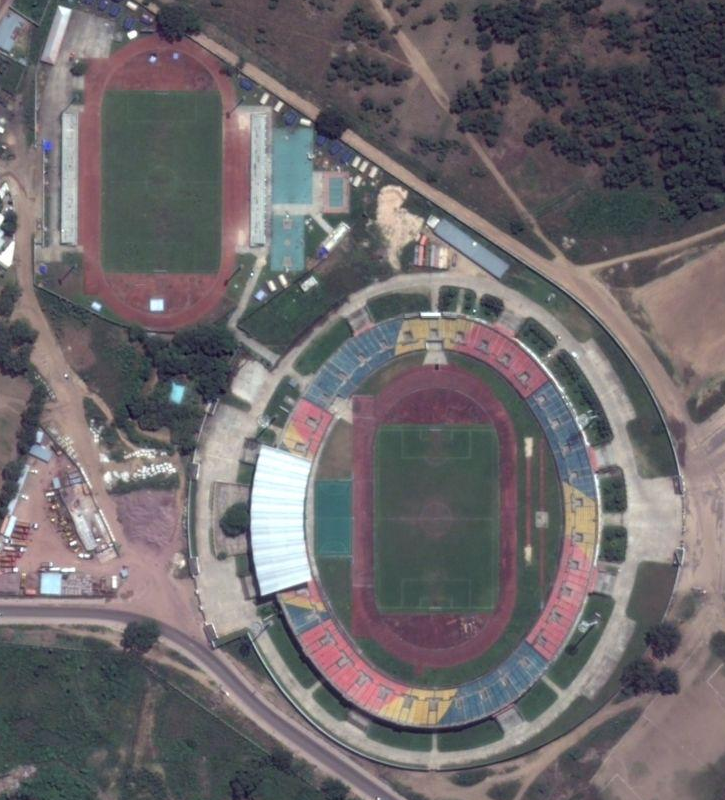
- The host stadium
- Host city: Brazzaville, Republic of the Congo
- Nations: 11
- Athletes: 1044
- Events: 5 sports
- Opening: 18 April 1987
- Closing: 30 April 1987
- Main venue: Stade Alphonse Massemba-Débat

The 1987 Central African Games was the third and final edition of the international multi-sport event between the nations of Central Africa. It was held from 18–30 April 1987 in Brazzaville, Republic of the Congo, with the Stade Alphonse Massemba-Débat serving as the main stadium. A total of eleven nations competed in five sports over the thirteen-day competition, with a total of 1044 athletes in attendance.

The event was originally planned to take place in Zaire in 1985, but was postponed due to financial issues. Brazzaville had previously hosted the Central African Cup event in 1972, which was itself a precursor to the games. The competition served as qualifying for the 1987 All-Africa Games held later that year.

== Sports ==
- Athletics ()
- Basketball ()
- Football () (men only)
- Handball ()
- Volleyball ()

In the athletics programme, a total of 36 track and field events (21 for men, 15 for women) were held. Cameroon topped the athletics medal table with 27 medals including 11 gold medals.

In the men's football final, on 30 April, Cameroon beat Angola 2–0.

== Participating nations ==
- Angola
- Burundi
- Cameroon
- Central African Republic
- Congo
- Chad
- Equatorial Guinea
- Gabon
- Rwanda
- São Tomé and Príncipe
- Zaire
