= Georgette Nkoma =

Cameroonian sprinter

Personal information
- Nationality: Cameroon
- Born: June 16, 1965 (age 61)
- Occupations: Athletics competitor, Television actor
Medal record
Women's athletics
Representing Cameroon
African Championships
Gold medal – first place	1996 Yaoundé	100 m
Gold medal – first place	1996 Yaoundé	200 m

Georgette Emilienne Nkoma (born 16 June 1965) is a Cameroonian sprinter. At the 1996 African Championships she won gold medals in both 100 and 200 metres. She also competed at the World Championships in 1993, 1995 and 1997, as well as in 4 × 100 m relay at the 1996 Summer Olympics without reaching the final.
