= 1981 Central African Games =

International multi-sport event

II Central African Games
- Host city: Luanda, Angola
- Nations: 10
- Athletes: 1200
- Events: 8 sports
- Opening: 20 August 1981
- Closing: 2 September 1981

The 1981 Central African Games was the second edition of the international multi-sport event between the nations of Central Africa. It was held from 20 August – 2 September 1981 in Luanda, Angola. A total of ten nations competed in eight sports over the fourteen-day competition, with a total of 1200 athletes in attendance.

The games was the first time a multi-sport event had been held in the newly independent Angola and Rogério Silva, former head of the Angolan Olympic Committee, credited the games with boosting the standards and participation within sport in the country. Angola later went on to win African championships in basketball and several African medals in handball.

== Sports ==
- Athletics ()
- Basketball ()
- Boxing ()
- Cycling ()
- Football () (men only)
- Handball ()
- Judo ()
- Volleyball ()

In the athletics programme, a total of 34 track and field events (20 for men, 14 for women) were held.

In the men's football competition, held from 21 to 29 August, Zaire topped the group undefeated with two wins and two draws to win the gold medal.

== Participating nations ==
- Angola
- Burundi
- Cameroon
- Congo
- Chad
- Gabon
- Rwanda
- São Tomé and Príncipe
- Zaire
