= Esaie Fongang =

Cameroonian middle-distance runner

Personal information
- Nationality: Cameroonian
- Born: 28 August 1943 (age 82)

Sport
- Sport: Middle-distance running
- Event: 1500 metres

Esaie Fongang (born 28 August 1943) is a Cameroonian middle-distance runner. He competed in the men's 1500 metres at the 1972 Summer Olympics.
