= Emmanuel Bitanga =

Cameroonian sprinter (1953–2008)

Personal information
- Nationality: Cameroonian
- Born: 5 December 1953
- Died: 9 December 2008 (aged 55)

Sport
- Sport: Sprinting
- Event: 200 metres
Medal record
Men's athletics
Representing Cameroon
African Championships
Bronze medal – third place	1979 Dakar	200 m

Emmanuel Bitanga (5 November 1953 – 9 December 2008) was a Cameroonian sprinter. In 1980, he set a national record in the 400-meter sprint. He competed in the men's 200 metres at the 1984 Summer Olympics. In 1998, Bitanga was appointed technical director of Centre Internationale d'Athletisme de Dakar (CIAD), a position which he held until 2006, when he resigned due to health concerns. While at the center, he worked to coach elite athletes such as Amy Mbacké Thiam and Eric Milazar. He is also listed as a co-author for several academic publications on the subject of sports physiology. Bitanga died 9 December 2008, in Yaoundé, Cameroon.
