= Assumpta Achuo-Bei =

Cameroonian sprinter

Personal information
- Nationality: Cameroonian
- Born: 27 April 1968 (age 57)

Sport
- Sport: Sprinting
- Event: 400 metres

Assumpta Achuo-Bei (born 27 April 1968) is a Cameroonian sprinter. She competed in the women's 400 metres at the 1988 Summer Olympics.
