= Agathe Ngo Nack =

Cameroonian discus thrower (born 1958)

Personal information
- Nationality: Cameroonian
- Born: 2 March 1958 (age 68)

Sport
- Sport: Athletics
- Event: Discus throw

Agathe Ngo Nack (born 2 March 1958) is a Cameroonian athlete. She competed in the women's discus throw at the 1984 Summer Olympics.
