= Personal record =

Individual's best performance in a sports exercise

A personal record, or a personal best (abbreviated to PB), is an individual's best performance in a given sporting discipline. It is most commonly found in athletic sports, such as track and field, other forms of running, swimming and weightlifting.

The term came from the world of running, referring to a person's best time in a race of a specific distance. So, if someone runs their first 5K race in 28:45, that's their PB for the 5-kilometre distance. If they run faster than 28:45 in a subsequent 5K race, then they have a new PB for that distance. Over time, PB came to mean any new record in a sport that could be performed by a single person.

Although the term "personal best" is increasingly used in official sports statistics, it can also refer to an unofficial best individual performance.
