= Bernard Mabikana =

Congolese hurdler

Personal information
- Nationality: Congolese
- Born: 1951 (age 74–75)

Sport
- Sport: Track and field
- Event: 110 metres hurdles

Bernard Mabikana (born 1951) is a Congolese hurdler. He competed in the men's 110 metres hurdles at the 1980 Summer Olympics.
