= 1976 Central African Games =

International multi-sport event

I Central African Games
- Host city: Libreville, Gabon
- Nations: 11
- Athletes: 1312
- Events: 8 sports
- Opening: 30 June 1976
- Closing: 10 July 1976

The 1976 Central African Games was the inaugural edition of the international multi-sport event between the nations of Central Africa. It was held from 30 June – 10 July 1976 in Libreville, Gabon. A total of eleven nations competed in eight sports over the eleven-day competition, with a total of 1312 athletes in attendance.

The competition was distinct from the 1953 Central African Games, which was contested in Zambia between East Central African countries.

== Sports ==
- Athletics ()
- Basketball ()
- Boxing ()
- Cycling ()
- Football () (men only)
- Handball ()
- Judo ()
- Volleyball ()

In the athletics programme, a total of 31 track and field events (19 for men, 12 for women) were held.

In the men's football final, held on 11 July at the Stade Omar Bongo before a crowd of 45,000, Cameroon defeated Republic of the Congo 3–2 through a goal by Roger Milla in the final minutes of extra time.

== Participating nations ==
- Angola
- Burundi
- Central African Republic
- Cameroon
- Congo
- Chad
- Equatorial Guinea
- Gabon
- Rwanda
- São Tomé and Príncipe
- Zaire
