= Paul Ngadjadoum =

Chadian athlete

Medal record

Men's athletics

Representing Chad

African Championships
Silver medal – second place	1988 Annaba	High jump

Paul Ngadjadoum (born 20 October 1957) is a Chadian former high jumper who competed in the 1988 Summer Olympics.
