= Théophile Nkounkou =

Congolese athlete

Personal information
- Nationality: Congolese
- Born: 7 January 1952 (age 74) Brazzaville, French Equatorial Africa (present-day Republic of the Congo)
- Height: 176 cm (5 ft 9 in)
- Weight: 74 kg (163 lb)

Sport
- Sport: Sprinting
- Event: 100 metres
Medal record
Men's athletics
Representing Congo
African Championships
Silver medal – second place	1979 Dakar	100 m
Silver medal – second place	1982 Cairo	100 m

Théophile Nkounkou (born 7 January 1952) is a Congolese sprinter. He competed in the men's 100 metres at the 1980 Summer Olympics. Nkounkou ran in heat 8, coming 3rd out of 7 runners with a time of 10.53 seconds, advancing to the quarterfinals. In the quarterfinals he was placed in race 3 and came 6th out of 8 runners with a time of 10.59 seconds. He did not advance to the semi-finals. Nkounkou also competed at the 1972 Summer Olympics in Munich, West Germany in the men's 4x100m relay. He raced along with Antoine Nkounkou, Louis Knanza and Jean-Pierre Bassegela. They raced in heat 4 and came 4th out of 8 teams with a time of 39.86 seconds. They advanced to the semi-finals and came 8th out of 8 runners in their race with a time of 39.97 seconds. They did not advance to the finals.

Nkounkou's personal best in the 100m is 10.28 seconds set on 8 September 1979 in Mexico City.
