= Louis Nkanza =

Congolese sprinter

Personal information
- Nationality: Congolese
- Born: 16 October 1949 (age 76)

Sport
- Sport: Sprinting
- Event: 4 × 100 metres relay

Louis Nkanza (born 16 October 1949) is a Congolese sprinter. He competed in the 4 × 100 metres relay at the 1972 Summer Olympics and the 1980 Summer Olympics.
