= Jean-Pierre Bassegela =

Congolese sprinter

Personal information
- Nationality: Congolese
- Born: 3 March 1947 (age 79)

Sport
- Sport: Sprinting
- Event: 200 metres

Jean-Pierre Bassegela (born 3 March 1947) is a Congolese sprinter. He competed in the men's 200 metres at the 1972 Summer Olympics.
