= Central African Games =

Previous international multi-sport event for countries within Central Africa

The Central African Games was an international multi-sport event for countries within Central Africa. It was held on three occasions: in 1976 in Libreville, Gabon, in 1981 in Luanda, Angola, and finally in 1987 in Brazzaville, People's Republic of the Congo.

== History ==
Between 1962 and 1964, was helds the Jeux de la Coupe des Tropiques. In 1972, a Central African Cup competition had been organised in Brazzaville, featuring a number of sporting events, and this proved to be a precursor to the Central African Games, which was first held four years later.

The first Games were designed as a buildup to the 1976 Summer Olympics, but this proved to be the year's highlight for many of the athletes as many African countries boycotted the Olympics in protest of New Zealand's sporting links with Apartheid-era South Africa.

Events at the final edition of the Games in 1987 acted as qualifiers for the 1987 All-Africa Games in some cases.

== Editions ==
=== Precedent games ===
==== Jeux de la Coupe des Tropiques ====
Edition	Year	Host city	Host nation	Start date	End date	Nations	Competitors	Sports	Events	Top Placed Team
I	1962	Bangui	Central African Rep.	24 December	31 December	?	?	?	?	
II	1964	Yaoundé	Cameroon	11 July	19 July	?	?	?	?	

==== Coupe d'Afrique Centrale ====
Edition	Year	Host city	Host nation	Start date	End date	Nations	Competitors	Sports	Events	Top Placed Team
I	1972	Brazzaville	Congo	13 July	23 July	?	?	?	?	
II	1974	N'Djamena	Chad	Cancelled						

=== Central African Games ===
Edition	Year	Host city	Host nation	Start date	End date	Nations	Competitors	Sports	Events	Top Placed Team
I	1976	Libreville	Gabon	30 June	10 July	11	1312	8	?	
II	1981	Luanda	Angola	20 August	2 September	10	1200	8	?	
III	1987	Brazzaville	Congo	18 April	30 April	11	1044	5	?	

== Sports ==
- Athletics
- Basketball
- Boxing
- Cycling
- Football
- Handball
- Judo
- Volleyball

== Nations ==
- Angola
- Burundi
- Cameroon
- Central African Republic
- Chad
- Equatorial Guinea
- Gabon
- People's Republic of the Congo
- Rwanda
- São Tomé and Príncipe
- Zaire

== See also ==
- African Friendship Games
- African Games
- South African Games (inactive)
- West African Games (inactive)
- Indian Ocean Island Games
- East African Community Games (EACoG)
- East African Schools Games (FEASSSA Games)
- Southern African Games (CUCSA Games)
