= Firas Al-Mahamid =

Syrian javelin thrower

Personal information
- Native name: فراس زعل المحاميد
- Full name: Firas Zaal Al-Mahamid
- Nationality: Syrian
- Born: 2 February 1977 (age 49) Daraa, Syria

Sport
- Country: Syria
- Sport: Athletics
- Event: Javelin throw
Medal record
Men's athletics
Representing Syria
Mediterranean Games
| Bronze medal – third place | 2005 Almería | Javelin |
West Asian Games
| Gold medal – first place | 1997 Tehran | Javelin |
| Bronze medal – third place | 2005 Doha | Javelin |
Pan Arab Games
| Gold medal – first place | 1997 Beirut | Javelin |
| Gold medal – first place | 2004 Algiers | Javelin |
| Silver medal – second place | 1999 Amman | Javelin |
Arab Championships
| Gold medal – first place | 1997 Taif | Javelin |
| Gold medal – first place | 2001 Damascus | Javelin |
| Silver medal – second place | 1999 Beirut | Javelin |
| Silver medal – second place | 2007 Amman | Javelin |
| Bronze medal – third place | 2003 Amman | Javelin |
Islamic Solidarity Games
| Silver medal – second place | 2005 Mecca | Javelin |

Firas Zaal Al-Mahamid (Arabic: فراس زعل المحاميد; born 2 February 1977) is a Syrian athlete, who is specialized in javelin throw. Twice during his career he participated at the World Championships: Athens 1997 and Helsinki 2005 (he finished both in qualifying rounds). He won the bronze medal in javelin at the 2005 Mediterranean Games. His personal best is 80.50 metres.

== Personal bests ==
- Javelin – 80.50 m NR (Beirut 1999)

== Competition record ==
| Year | Competition | Venue | Position | Notes |
Representing Syria
| 1994 | Arab Junior Championships | Tunis, Tunisia | 2nd | 62.96 m |
| 1996 | Arab Junior Championships | Latakia, Syria | 2nd | 62.26 m |
| 1997 | Pan Arab Games | Beirut, Lebanon | 1st | 72.56 m GR, CR |
| 1997 | World Championships | Athens, Greece | 28th (q) | 74.04 m |
| 1997 | Arab Championships | Taif, KSA | 1st | 74.74 m CR |
| 1997 | West Asian Games | Tehran, Iran | 1st | 71.10 m |
| 1998 | Asian Championships | Fukuoka, Japan | 9th | 69.46 m |
| 1998 | Asian Games | Bangkok, Thailand | 10th | 64.19 m |
| 1999 | Pan Arab Games | Amman, Jordan | 2nd | 72.91 m |
| 1999 | Arab Championships | Beirut, Lebanon | 2nd | 69.34 m |
| 2001 | Arab Championships | Damascus, Syria | 1st | 77.55 m CR |
| 2001 | Mediterranean Games | Radès, Tunisia | 11th | 70.02 m |
| 2002 | Asian Championships | Colombo, Sri Lanka | 7th | 69.83 m |
| 2002 | Asian Games | Busan, South Korea | 8th | 70.25 m |
| 2003 | Arab Championships | Amman, Jordan | 3rd | 71.88 m |
| 2004 | Pan Arab Games | Algiers, Algeria | 1st | 75.84 m |
| 2005 | Islamic Solidarity Games | Mecca, Saudi Arabia | 2nd | 65.26 m |
| 2005 | Mediterranean Games | Almería, Spain | 3rd | 73.49 m |
| 2005 | World Championships | Helsinki, Finland | 20th (q) | 72.63 m |
| 2005 | Asian Championships | Incheon, South Korea | 10th | 70.40 m |
| 2005 | West Asian Games | Doha, Qatar | 3rd | 69.59 m |
| 2006 | Asian Games | Doha, Qatar | 6th | 69.81 m |
| 2007 | Arab Championships | Amman, Jordan | 2nd | 68.60 m |
| 2007 | Asian Championships | Amman, Jordan | 8th | 67.30 m |
