= Athletics at the 1999 Arab Games =

Athletics at the IX Pan Arab Games
- Dates: 11 to 14 August
- Host city: Amman, Jordan
- Venue: Prince Hasan Youth City Stadium
- Events: 45

At the 1999 Pan Arab Games, the athletics events were held at the Prince Hasan Youth City Stadium in the Al Hasan Sport City Complex in Irbid, Jordan from 11 to 14 August.

The athletics events were held before the official opening ceremony of the games on 18 August due to their proximity to the 1999 World Championships in Athletics, also held that month.

A total of 45 events were contested, of which 23 by male and 22 by female athletes (the men's programme featured a steeplechase event). The women's road events were shorter than the men's, having a half marathon compared to the men's marathon and a 10 km walk compared to a 20 km walk.

The competition was affected by the highest profile doping incident of the games. Siham Hanafi originally won three sprinting gold medals for Morocco, taking the women's 100 metres, 200 metres and 4×100 metres relay titles. She lost all three after testing positive for nandrolone (a banned steroid) and the Moroccan relay team was entirely disqualified. Discus throw bronze medallist Karima Shaheen, also of Morocco, was another athlete whose result was annulled due to a drug test failure, again for nandrolone.

The electronic timing system at the event failed during the competition and as a result some of the races were hand-timed. In the men's 110 metres hurdles fifteen-year-old Nassim Qarbani Ibrahim of Qatar ran a hand-timed 13.9 in the preliminary round before running an electronic 14.17 seconds as runner-up in the final – these were the best ever times for the event by an athlete his age.

== Medal summary ==
=== Men ===
Event	Gold		Silver		Bronze	
100 metres	Jamal Al-Saffar (KSA)	10.39	Saad Muftah Al-Kuwari (QAT)	10.43	Sultan Mohamed Al-Sheib (QAT)	10.47
200 metres	Hamoud Al-Dalhami (OMN)	20.65 w	Mohamed Al-Houti (OMN)	20:81 w	Ibrahim Ismail Muftah (QAT)	21:01
400 metres (Hand-timed)	Ibrahim Ismail Muftah (QAT)	45.7	Sofiane Labidi (TUN)	45.9	Hamdan Al-Bishi (KSA)	46.4
800 metres	Ali Hakimi (TUN)	1:49.76	Rachid Khoua (MAR)	1:50.16	Mouhssin Chehibi (MAR)	1:50.40
1500 metres	Ali Hakimi (TUN)	3:43.43	Youssef Baba (MAR)	3:43.91	Mohammed Amyn (MAR)	3:47.19
5000 metres	Adil Kaouch (MAR)	14:05.71	Ahmed Ibrahim Warsama (QAT)	14:05.99	Said Al-Brewei (MAR)	14:19.71
10,000 metres	Ahmed Ibrahim Warsama (QAT)	30:13.3	Lahcen Benyoussef (MAR)	?	?	?
110 metres hurdles	Mubarak Khasif (QAT)	14.05	Nassim Qarbani Ibrahim (QAT)	14.17	Mohamed Samy (EGY)	14.33
400 metres hurdles	Hadi Soua'an Al-Somaily (KSA)	50.02	Zahr-Edin Al Najem (SYR)	50.38	El Hefeny Ibrahim (EGY)	51.58
3000 metres steeplechase	Ridha Chikhaoui (TUN)	8:52.52	Hassan Al-Asmari (KSA)	8:56.24	Zouhair Ouerdi (MAR)	8:58.84
4×100 metres relay	Saudi Arabia (KSA)	39.62	Qatar (QAT)	39.63	Oman (OMN)	39.78
4×400 metres relay	Saudi Arabia (KSA)	3:06.72	Morocco (MAR); Mehdi El Ghazouani; Nabil Jabir; Hicham Mihrjane; Jamal Ait Faraj	3:07.17	Egypt (EGY)	3:09.25
Marathon	Ahmed Abdelmogoud (EGY)	2:31:16	Tahar Mansouri (TUN)	2:33:46	Adel El-Deli (LBA)	2:34:15
20 km walk	Hatem Ghoula (TUN)	1:40:01	?	?	?	?
High jump	Fakhredin Fouad (JOR)	2.19 m	Jean-Claude Rabbath (LIB)	2.16 m	Ali Mohamed Fadaak (QAT)	2.13 m
Pole vault	Mohamed Bedioui (TUN)	5.00 m	Abdulla Ghanim Saeed (QAT)	4.80 m	Moulay Rachid Alaoui (MAR)	3.80 m
Long jump	Hussein Al-Sabee (KSA)	7.93 m	Mehdi El Ghazouani (MAR)	7.76 m	Abdulrahman Al-Nubi (QAT)	7.72 m
Triple jump	Mohamed Abdulaziz Hamdi (QAT)	16.44 m	Salem Al-Ahmedi (KSA)	16.35 m	Majed Abdulsadah (IRQ)	16.23 m
Shot put	Bilal Saad Mubarak (QAT)	18.83 m	?	? m	?	? m
Discus throw	Rashid Shafi Al-Dosari (QAT)	59.51 m	Abdullah Al-Shammari (KSA)	55.23 m	Khalid Al-Khalidi (KSA)	54.94 m
Hammer throw	Samir Haouam (ALG)	68.75 m	Yamine Abdelmoneim (EGY)	65.02 m	Hamad Al-Khodhairi (QAT)	58.52 m
Javelin throw	Ali Saleh Al-Jadani (KSA)	77.85 m	Firas Al-Mahamid (SYR)	72.91 m	Maher Ridane (TUN)	71.47 m
Decathlon	Anis Riahi (TUN)	7341 pts	Ahmad Hassan Moussa (QAT)	7307 pts	Rédouane Youcef (ALG)	7171 pts

=== Women ===
Event	Gold		Silver		Bronze	
100 metres^{[a]}	Fatima Zahra Dkouk (MAR)	11.72 w	Karima Meskin Saad (EGY)	11.80 w	Awatef Hamrouni (TUN)	11.96 w
200 metres^{[b]}	Fatima Zahra Dkouk (MAR)	24.58	Awatef Hamrouni (TUN)	24.94	Awatef Ben Hassine (TUN)	27.42
400 metres	Awatef Ben Hassine (TUN)	55.46	Karima Meskin Saad (EGY)	56.14	Bouchra Zabord (MAR)	56.58
800 metres	Nahida Touhami (ALG)	2:06.17	Saadid Saadi (MAR)	2:06.21	Abir Nakhli (TUN)	2:07.37
1500 metres	Fatma Lanouar (TUN)	4:19.29	Samira Raif (MAR)	4:20.29	Seloua Ouaziz (MAR)	4:21.69
5000 metres	Saliha Khaldoun (MAR)	16:46.1	Fatma Lanouar (TUN)	17:05.04	Bouchra Benthami (MAR)	17:11.68
10,000 metres	Asmae Leghzaoui (MAR)	32:56.76	Malika Asahssah (MAR)	35:46.00	Soulef Bouguerra (TUN)	35:48.12
100 metres hurdles	Saida Rouchdi (MAR)	15.01	Zine-Bahi Othmani (TUN)	15.37	Rola Hambersmian (SYR)	15.49
400 metres hurdles	Zahra Lachguer (MAR)	60.62	Houreya Al-Mohandess (MAR)	61.70	Hala Ahmed Abderrahim (EGY)	63.38
4×100 metres relay^{[c]}	Tunisia (TUN)	48.49	Egypt (EGY)	49.49	Jordan (JOR)	51.21
4×400 metres relay	Morocco (MAR); Bouchra Zboured; Najia Bouaati; Zahra Lachgar; Houria El Mohandis	3:43.50	Tunisia (TUN)	3:44.70	Egypt (EGY)	4:06.94
Half marathon	Nadia Ejjafini (MAR)	1:16:36	Nasria Azaïdj (ALG)	1:16:59	Zainab Bakkour (SYR)	1:18:11
10 km walk	Nagwa Ibrahim (EGY)	51:06	Bahia Boussad (ALG)	53:39	Wafaa Mohamed (TUN)	1:00:01
High jump	Ghada Shouaa (SYR)	1.78 m	Sarah Bouaoudia (ALG)	1.75 m	Rim Salma Achour (TUN)	1.75 m
Pole vault	Syrine Balti (TUN)	3.60 m	Aida Mohsni (TUN)	3.20 m	Racha Karam Mohamed (EGY)	3.00 m
Long jump	Fatima Zahra Dkouk (MAR)	6.50 m	Ghada Shouaa (SYR)	6.19 m	Sarah Bouaoudia (ALG)	5.70 m
Triple jump	Ilham Bensalah (TUN)	12.97 m	Fatima Zahra Dkouk (MAR)	12.66 m	Monia Jelassi (TUN)	12.57 m
Shot put	Nada Kawar (JOR)	17.33 m	Ghada Shouaa (SYR)	16.25 m	Wafaa Ismail Baghdadi (EGY)	15.57 m
Discus throw	Nada Kawar (JOR)	57.52 m	Monia Kari (TUN)	57.43 m	Walaa Khalil Ibrahim (EGY)	43.52 m
Hammer throw^{[d]}	Marwa Hussein (EGY)	58.97 m	Djida Nawel Ialloulene (ALG)	50.31 m	Monia Kari (TUN)	49.91 m
Javelin throw (old javelin model)	Ghada Shouaa (SYR)	55.14 m	Aïda Sellam (TUN)	48.69 m	Many Mostafa (EGY)	41.98 m
Heptathlon	Hanen Dhouibi (TUN)	4853 pts	Rola Hambersmian (SYR)	4592 pts	Manal Baki (TUN)	4537 pts

- ^{a} Morocco's Siham Hanafi was the initial winner in 11.48 seconds, before her disqualification for doping
- ^{b} Morocco's Hanafi was the initial winner in 24.34 seconds, before her disqualification for doping
- ^{c} Morocco was the initial winner in 46.89 seconds, before Hanafi's disqualification for doping
- ^{d} Morocco's Karima Shaheen was the initial bronze medallist with 49.91 metres, before her disqualification for doping

== Medal table ==
* Host nation (Jordan)

Rank	Nation	Gold	Silver	Bronze	Total
1	Tunisia	12	9	10	31
2	Morocco	10	10	8	28
3	Qatar	6	6	5	17
4	Saudi Arabia	6	4	2	12
5	Egypt	3	4	11	18
6	Jordan*	3	0	1	4
7	Algeria	2	5	2	9
7	Syria	2	5	2	9
9	Oman	1	1	1	3
10	Lebanon	0	1	0	1
11	Libya	0	0	2	2
12	Iraq	0	0	1	1
Totals (12 entries)		45	45	45	135

== See also ==
- 1999 Arab Athletics Championships
