= 1996 Arab Junior Athletics Championships =

7th Arab Junior Athletics Championships
- Host city: Latakia, Syria
- Events: 41

The 1996 Arab Junior Athletics Championships was the seventh edition of the international athletics competition for under-20 athletes from Arab countries. It took place in Latakia, Syria. A total of 41 athletics events were contested, 22 for men and 19 for women. Morocco, a regional power in the sport, did not send a team to the meeting.

The road race competition was dropped from the programme, matching the change at the 1996 World Junior Championships in Athletics and a general move away from road running events for junior athletes. A women's 5000 metres replaced the 3000 metres, but this was a short-lived change as the 3000 m was brought back the following edition. This was the last time the women's 10,000 metres was held (the 5000 m taking its place at future editions (a change also reflected at the world junior level).

Algeria topped the medal table with twelve gold medals, closely followed by Tunisia with ten golds. Saudi Arabia managed seven gold medals despite not participating in the women's section. Sudan won its first titles at the competition, courtesy of Mohammed Yagoub's middle-distance double.

In the men's section, Algeria provided the most prominent athletes. Abderrahmane Hammad improved one place from the last edition to win the high jump – an event he won an Olympic medal in four years later. Two others here would medal at the 2000 Sydney Olympics: 800 metres bronze medallist Djabir Saïd-Guerni and 1500 metres runner-up Ali Saïdi-Sief. Two Saudi Arabian medallists later became successful seniors: Mukhlid Al-Otaibi (5000 m runner-up here) did a long-distance double at the 2002 Asian Games; 15-year-old Hamdan Al-Bishi won a 200 m bronze in Latakia and won numerous medals at Asian level. Tunisia's Sofiane Labidi won a 200 m/400 m double and later won African and Arab medals as a senior. Jean-Claude Rabbath, runner-up in the high jump, was Lebanon's first ever medallist at the tournament.

In the women's section Algeria's Baya Rahouli was dominant: she won the 100 metres, long jump and triple jump titles, and a shot put bronze. This versatility continued at the 1997 Pan Arab Games, where she was a quadruple gold medallist. Double sprint medallist Nahida Touhami would also become a senior champion at the Arab Games. Fatma Lanouar was a double medallist in middle-distance and was a two-time Mediterranean Games champion later in her career.

== Medal summary ==
=== Men ===
Event	Gold		Silver		Bronze	
100 metres	Mohammed Hiba Seif (KSA)	10.84	Khalifa Sake (KSA)	10.97	Khaldoun Raghib (EGY)	11.13
200 metres	Sofiane Labidi (TUN)	21.68	Khalil Falata (KSA)	21.79	Mohammed Hiba Seif (KSA)	22.05
400 metres	Sofiane Labidi (TUN)	46.77 CR	Khalid Atiq Al-Johar (KUW)	47.59	Hamdan Al-Bishi (KSA)	47.74
800 metres	Mohammed Yagoub (SUD)	1:47.44 CR	Rachid Amor (TUN)	1:49.1	Djabir Saïd-Guerni (ALG)	1:50.2
1500 metres	Mohammed Yagoub (SUD)	3:40.5 CR	Ali Saïdi-Sief (ALG)	3:42.8	Youcef Abdi (ALG)	3:44.6
5000 metres	Miloud Abaoub (ALG)	14:08.4 CR	Mukhlid Al-Otaibi (KSA)	14:37.3	Issam El Hamani (TUN)	14:47.2
10,000 metres	Mohammed Abdullah Al-Qahtani (KSA)	31:51.6	Walib Naceur El Chouchi (TUN)	31:55.7	Ali Adwan (JOR)	32:13.9
110 m hurdles	Nader Hosni Saad (EGY)	14.86	Hussain Al-Yoha (KUW)	15.22	Ghiyas Abou Hamed (SYR)	15.34
400 m hurdles	Saleh Ahmed Al-Seaidan (KSA)	51.59	Noureddin Noumi Bakri (EGY)	51.86	Badr Abdulrahman Aman (KUW)	52.63
3000 metres steeplechase	Rachid Baghdadi (ALG)	8:59.64	Issam El Hamani (TUN)	9:04.38	Adamo Othmane (ALG)	9:12.48
4 × 100 m relay	Saudi Arabia (KSA)	41.31	Kuwait (KUW)	41.7	Algeria (ALG)	42.0
4 × 400 m relay	Kuwait (KUW)	3:12.7	Tunisia (TUN)	3:13.1	Saudi Arabia (KSA)	3:15.2
10,000 m walk	Merzak Abbès (ALG)	48:24.0	Arezki Yahiaoui (ALG)	48:44.4	Khalid Aboud (SYR)	49:34.8
High jump	Abderrahmane Hammad (ALG)	2.11 m CR	Jean-Claude Rabbath (LIB)	2.05 m	Nazim Bouabès (ALG)	2.05 m
Pole vault	Mohamed Bédoui (TUN)	4.80 m	Mohamed Benyahia (ALG)	4.75 m	Khetam Al-Hajiri (KUW)	4.60 m
Long jump	Walid Karim (ALG)	7.03 m	Akram Bensmira (ALG)	6.90 m	Abdu Faraj (KUW)	6.80 m
Triple jump	Mohammed Adam Mohammed (KSA)	15.80 m CR	Karim Ould Ahmed (ALG)	15.44 m	Fayez Al-Khairat (SYR)	15.25 m
Shot put	Nasser Saeed Al-Tahnoun (KUW)	15.80 m CR	Abdullah Ibel (KUW)	15.60 m	Mohamed Yahia Rashid (EGY)	15.38 m
Discus throw	Abdullah Al-Shoumari (KSA)	49.90 m CR	Tarek Abderrahman Mahmoud (EGY)	48.44 m	Tarek Yazidi (TUN)	48.30 m
Hammer throw	Yamen Hussein Abdel Moneim (EGY)	58.38 m	Adel Faraj (KUW)	58.10 m	Anwar Falah (KUW)	55.16 m
Javelin throw	Ali Saleh Al-Jadani (KSA)	64.38 m	Firas Zaal Al-Mohammed (SYR)	62.26 m	Mohammed Mansour (KSA)	55.92 m
Decathlon	Mohammed Al-Dahan (SYR)	6679 pts	Mohamed Benyahia (ALG)	6480 pts	Akram Mubarak (KSA)	6110 pts

=== Women ===
Event	Gold		Silver		Bronze	
100 metres	Baya Rahouli (ALG)	12.25	Ahlem Allali (ALG)	12.28	Awatef Hamrouni (TUN)	12.83
200 metres	Ahlem Allali (ALG)	25.31	Nahida Touhami (ALG)	25.74	Awatef Hamrouni (TUN)	25.97
400 metres	Nahida Touhami (ALG)	57.20	Lynda Kabous (ALG)	57.85	Nabila Jami (TUN)	58.24
800 metres	Khadija Touati (ALG)	2:12.49	Fatma Lanouar (TUN)	2:15.08	Noura Makni (TUN)	2:16.15
1500 metres	Fatma Lanouar (TUN)	4:29.22 CR	Khadija Touati (ALG)	4:30.48	Noura Makni (TUN)	4:31.39
5000 metres	Soulef Bouguerra (TUN)	17:35.3	Linda Rabhi (TUN)	17:44.2	Fouzia Zoutat (ALG)	17:44.8
10,000 metres	Soulef Bouguerra (TUN)	40:58.40	Zeinab Bakour (SYR)	41:04.42	Amal Al-Matari (JOR)	41:12.26
100 m hurdles	Ahlem Allali (ALG)	14.55 CR	Rania Abdel Aziz Ahmed (EGY)	14.61	Ghufran Zewanah (TUN)	17.23
400 m hurdles	Nabila Jami (TUN)	63.44	Rania Abdel Aziz Ahmed (EGY)	64.52	Samar Danoum (SYR)	66.68
4 × 100 m relay	Algeria (ALG)	47.46 CR	Tunisia (TUN)	48.79	Syria (SYR)	52.61
4 × 400 m relay	Algeria (ALG)	3:54.1	Tunisia (TUN)	3:56.9	Syria (SYR)	4:12.2
5000 m walk	Hiba El Hussein (EGY)	30:30.3	Fayhaa Suleiman (SYR)	31:15.6	Iman Obeid (SYR)	31:40.2
High jump	Hanène Khalil (TUN)	1.61 m	Hamida Benhocine (ALG)	1.55 m	Hanène Dhouibi (TUN)	1.55 m
Long jump	Baya Rahouli (ALG)	5.82 m CR	Hamida Benhocine (ALG)	5.15 m	Maha Al-Mohammed (SYR)	5.04 m
Triple jump	Baya Rahouli (ALG)	13.84 m CR	Ilhem Ben Salah (TUN)	11.70 m	Maha Al-Mohammed (SYR)	10.92 m
Shot put	Amira Naji Semlawi (EGY)	12.44 m	Wala Khalil Ibrahim (EGY)	11.44 m	Baya Rahouli (ALG)	11.12 m
Discus throw	Nasrine Dahman (TUN)	40.20 m	Wala Khalil Ibrahim (EGY)	35.86 m	Amira Naji Semlawi (EGY)	35.52 m
Javelin throw	Rola Hambersmian (SYR)	37.00 m	Rania Hafez (EGY)	34.94 m	Nasrine Dahman (TUN)	33.86 m
Heptathlon	Hanène Dhouibi (TUN)	4151 pts	Rola Hambersmian (SYR)	3970 pts	Mai Mohammed (SYR)	2780 pts

== Medal table ==
Rank	Nation	Gold	Silver	Bronze	Total
1	Algeria (ALG)	14	12	7	33
2	Tunisia (TUN)	10	9	10	29
3	Saudi Arabia (KSA)	7	3	5	15
4	Egypt (EGY)	4	7	3	14
5	Kuwait (KUW)	2	5	4	11
6	Syria (SYR)	2	4	10	16
7	Sudan (SUD)	2	0	0	2
8	Lebanon (LIB)	0	1	0	1
9	Jordan (JOR)	0	0	2	2
Totals (9 entries)		41	41	41	123
