= Mohammad Hazzory =

Syrian triple jumper (born 1983)

Personal information
- Nationality: Syria
- Born: 1 January 1983 (age 43) Aleppo, Syria
- Height: 178 cm (5 ft 10 in)
- Weight: 65 kg (143 lb)

Sport
- Sport: Athletics
- Events: Triple jump, Long jump
Medal record
Men's athletics
Representing Syria
Asian Indoor Championships
Silver medal – second place	2004 Tehran	Triple jump
Silver medal – second place	2006 Pattaya	Triple jump
West Asian Games
Gold medal – first place	2005 Doha	Triple jump
Pan Arab Games
Gold medal – first place	2004 Algiers	Triple jump
Arab Championships
Silver medal – second place	2003 Amman	Triple jump
Islamic Solidarity Games
Gold medal – first place	2005 Mecca	Triple jump

Mohammad Hazzory (also spelled Hazouri, Arabic: محمد حزوري; born 1 January 1983 in Aleppo) is a former Syrian triple jumper.

He finished fifth at the 2003 Asian Championships, sixth at the 2005 Asian Championships and fifth at the 2006 Asian Games. He also competed at the 2004 Olympic Games without reaching the final.

His personal best jump is 16.67 metres, achieved at the 2005 Mediterranean Games in June 2005 in Almería.

== Personal bests ==
Outdoor

- Triple jump – 16.67 NR (Almería 2005)
- Long jump – 7.28 m (Damascus 2000)

Indoor

- Triple jump – 16.42 NR (Tehran 2004)

== Competition record ==
Year	Competition	Venue	Position	Event	Notes
Representing Syria
1999	World Youth Championships	Bydgoszcz, Poland	20th (q)	Long jump	6.85 m
2000	Arab Junior Championships	Damascus, Syria	1st	Long jump	7.28 m
2000	Arab Junior Championships	Damascus, Syria	1st	Triple jump	15.21 m
2002	West Asian Games	Kuwait	4th	Triple jump	15.91 m
2002	Asian Junior Championships	Bangkok, Thailand	3rd	Triple jump	16.17 m
2003	Asian Championships	Manila, Philippines	5th	Triple jump	16.48 m
2003	Arab Championships	Amman, Jordan	2nd	Triple jump	16.50 m
2004	Asian Indoor Championships	Tehran, Iran	2nd	Triple jump	16.42 m
2004	Olympic Games	Athens, Greece	25th (q)	Triple jump	16.37 m
2004	Pan Arab Games	Algiers, Algeria	1st	Triple jump	16.58 m
2005	Islamic Solidarity Games	Mecca, Saudi Arabia	1st	Triple jump	16.39 m
2005	Mediterranean Games	Almería, Spain	4th	Triple jump	16.67 m
2005	Asian Championships	Incheon, South Korea	6th	Triple jump	16.26 m
2005	West Asian Games	Doha, Qatar	1st	Triple jump	16.48 m
2006	Asian Indoor Championships	Pattaya, Thailand	2nd	Triple jump	16.20 m
2006	Asian Games	Doha, Qatar	5th	Triple jump	16.42 m
2007	Asian Championships	Amman, Jordan	4th	Triple jump	16.60 m (w)
2010	West Asian Championships	Aleppo, Syria	4th	Triple jump	15.76 m
