= Zainab Bakkour =

Syrian long-distance runner

Personal information
- Full name: Zainab Bakkour
- Nationality: Syria
- Born: 29 March 1978 (age 48) Damascus, Syria
- Height: 1.55 m (5 ft 1 in)
- Weight: 50 kg (110 lb)

Sport
- Sport: Athletics
- Event: Long-distance running

Achievements and titles
- Personal best: 5000 m: 17:03.60
Medal record
Women's athletics
Representing Syria
Pan Arab Games
| Bronze medal – third place | 1999 Amman | Half Marathon |
Arab Championships
| Gold medal – first place | 1998 Damascus | 5000 m |
| Gold medal – first place | 1998 Damascus | 10000 m |
| Gold medal – first place | 1998 Damascus | Half Marathon |
| Gold medal – first place | 1999 Beirut | 800 m |
| Gold medal – first place | 1999 Beirut | 1500 m |
| Gold medal – first place | 1999 Beirut | 5000 m |
| Gold medal – first place | 1999 Beirut | 10000 m |
| Gold medal – first place | 1999 Beirut | Half Marathon |
| Silver medal – second place | 1993 Latakia | 3000 m |
| Silver medal – second place | 2001 Damascus | 5000 m |
| Silver medal – second place | 2001 Damascus | 10000 m |
| Silver medal – second place | 2003 Amman | 10000 m |
| Silver medal – second place | 2003 Amman | Half Marathon |
| Bronze medal – third place | 1993 Latakia | 1500 m |

Zainab Bakkour (Arabic: زينب بكور; born March 29, 1978, in Damascus) is a retired Syrian long-distance runner. She represented her nation Syria at the 2004 Summer Olympics, and also ran her own personal best and a national record of 17:03.60 in the women's 5000 metres at the 2000 Syrian Athletics Championships in Damascus. She was the best Syrian and Arab long-distance runner in 1990s.

Bakkour qualified as a lone female athlete for the Syrian squad in the women's 5000 metres at the 2004 Summer Olympics in Athens, by granting a tripartite invitation from the Syrian Olympic Committee and the IAAF. She ran a seasonal best of 17:18.66 to obtain an eighteenth spot in a field of twenty registered athletes, but did not advance further in the final, trailing behind the leader Tirunesh Dibaba of Ethiopia by a wide, two-minute gap.

== Personal bests ==
- 800 m – 2:15.67 (Beirut 1999)
- 1500 m – 4:45.10 (Beirut 1999)
- 5000 m – 17:03.60 NR (Damascus 2000)
- 10,000 – 36:11.94 NR (Bangkok 1998)

== Competition record ==
| Year | Competition | Venue | Position | Event | Notes |
Representing Syria
| 1993 | Arab Championships | Latakia, Syria | 3rd | 1500 m | 4:45.4 |
| 1993 | Arab Championships | Latakia, Syria | 2nd | 3000 m | 10:54.7 |
| 1996 | Arab Junior Championships | Latakia, Syria | 2nd | 10,000 m | 41:04.42 |
| 1998 | Arab Championships | Damascus, Syria | 1st | 5000 m | 17:52.9 |
| 1998 | Arab Championships | Damascus, Syria | 1st | 10,000 m | 37:21.1 |
| 1998 | Arab Championships | Damascus, Syria | 1st | Half Marathon | 1:27:1 |
| 1998 | Asian Games | Bangkok, Thailand | 9th | 5000 m | 17:56.63 |
| 1998 | Asian Games | Bangkok, Thailand | 7th | 10,000 m | 36:11.94 |
| 1999 | Arab Championships | Beirut, Lebanon | 1st | 800 m | 2:15.67 |
| 1999 | Arab Championships | Beirut, Lebanon | 1st | 1500 m | 4:45.1 |
| 1999 | Arab Championships | Beirut, Lebanon | 1st | 5000 m | 17:37.85 |
| 1999 | Arab Championships | Beirut, Lebanon | 1st | 10,000 m | 38:29.03 |
| 1999 | Arab Championships | Beirut, Lebanon | 1st | Half Marathon | 1:31:46 |
| 1999 | Pan Arab Games | Amman, Jordan | 3rd | Half Marathon | 1:18:11 |
| 2001 | Arab Championships | Damascus, Syria | 2nd | 5000 m | 17:21.9 |
| 2001 | Arab Championships | Damascus, Syria | 2nd | 10,000 m | 36:23.88 |
| 2003 | Arab Championships | Amman, Jordan | 2nd | 10,000 m | 36:39.2 |
| 2003 | Arab Championships | Amman, Jordan | 2nd | Half Marathon | 1:24:58 |
| 2004 | Olympic Games | Athens, Greece | 39th (q) | 5000 m | 17:18.66 |
