= 1997–98 Arab Athletics Championships =

10th Arab Athletics Championships
- Dates: 10–12 September 1997 and 25–27 June 1998
- Host city: Ta'if, Saudi Arabia and Damascus, Syria
- Events: 42

The 1997 Arab Athletics Championships was the tenth edition of the international athletics competition between Arab countries. The tournament occurred in two parts in two different years, with the sexes competing in different locations for the first and so far only time. A total of 42 athletics events were contested, 22 for men and 20 for women.

The scheduled 1997 championships was held from 10 to 12 September in Ta'if, Saudi Arabia and featured only men's events. Regional powers Morocco and Tunisia were absent from this meeting. The men's marathon and racewalking events were dropped from the programme, with the half marathon remaining as the only road event.

A corresponding women's tournament was belatedly staged between 25 and 27 June 1998 in Damascus, Syria. Only five nations participated in the women's events: Tunisia, Egypt, Syria, Lebanon and Palestine

== Medal summary ==
=== Men ===
Men's competition played between 10 and 12 September 1997 in Ta'if, Saudi Arabia.

Event	Gold		Silver		Bronze	
100 metres (wind: +2.7 m/s)	Sultan Mohamed Al-Sheib (QAT)	10.22	Saad Muftah Al-Kuwari (QAT)	10.27	Mohamed Hiba Saif (KSA)	10.38
200 metres	Mohamed Al-Houti (OMN)	20.81	Ibrahim Ismail Muftah (QAT)	20.86	Malik Louahla (ALG)	20.91
400 metres	Ibrahim Ismail Muftah (QAT)	45.44	Hamdan Al-Bishi (KSA)	46.51	Sami Suleiman Srour (QAT)	47.77
800 metres	Mohammed Yagoub (SUD)	1:51.07	Djabir Saïd-Guerni (ALG)	1:51.24	Othman Mohamed Othman (KSA)	1:52.02
1500 metres	Mohammed Yagoub (SUD)	3:44.18	Mohamed Suleiman (QAT)	3:47.83	Ahmed Karama (ALG)	3:48.10
5000 metres	Alyan Sultan Al-Qahtani (KSA)	14:25.08	Jamal Abdi Hassan (QAT)	14:43.04	Kamal Kohil (ALG)	14:47.08
10,000 metres	Ahmed Ibrahim Warsama (QAT)	30:41.02	Kamal Kohil (ALG)	30:43.86	Abdallah Youssef (QAT)	31:37.57
3000 metres steeplechase	Saad Al-Asmari (KSA)	8:53.08	Jamal Abdi Hassan (QAT)	8:56.78	Laïd Bessou (ALG)	8:57.90
110 metres hurdles	Mubarak Khasif (QAT)	13.87	Hamad Mubarak Al-Dosari (QAT)	14.92	Bader Abbas (KUW)	14.25
400 metres hurdles	Mubarak Al-Nubi (QAT)	49.63	Ibrahim El Hefeny (EGY)	51.06	Ali Ismaïl Abdelmoneim (QAT)	51.44
4 × 100 m relay	Qatar (QAT)	39.94	Algeria (ALG)	40.26	Oman (OMN)	40.86
4 × 400 m relay	Qatar (QAT)	3:09.20	Saudi Arabia (KSA)	3:13.79	Algeria (ALG)	3:15.87
Half marathon	Abdallah Youssef (QAT)	1:06:17	Ahmed Adam Saleh (SUD)	1:06:19	Abidi Saïd (DJI)	1:07:02
High jump	Fakhredin Fouad (JOR)	2.17 m	Abderrahmane Hammad (ALG)	2.17 m	Majed Sultan El Manaa (KSA)	2.11 m
Pole vault	Ahmad Abdulkarim (QAT)	5.05 m	Rafik Mefti (ALG)	5.05 m	Walid Zayed (QAT)	4.70 m
Long jump	Hussein Al-Sabee (KSA)	8.01 m	Hatem Mersal (EGY)	7.92 m	Salem Al-Ahmedi (KSA)	7.62 m
Triple jump	Salem Al-Ahmedi (KSA)	17 m	Mohamed Mohamed Adam (KSA)	16.11 m	Ibrahim Mohamedin (QAT)	16.03 m
Shot put	Bilal Saad Mubarak (QAT)	19.65 m	Khaled Suliman Al-Khalidi (KSA)	17.56 m	Abdallah Soursour (KUW)	16.57 m
Discus throw	Khaled Suliman Al-Khalidi (KSA)	54.68 m	Abdullah Al-Shammari (KSA)	52.80 m	Tarek Al-Najjar (JOR)	51.52 m
Hammer throw	Hakim Toumi (ALG)	71.28 m	Cherif El Hennawi (EGY)	70.48 m	Naser Abdullah Al-Jarallah (KUW)	67.84 m
Javelin throw	Firas Al Mahamid (SYR)	74.74 m	Ali Saleh Al-Jadani (KSA)	74.10 m	Walid Abderrazak Mohamed (EGY)	71.92 m
Decathlon	Hassan Farouk Sayed (EGY)	6788 pts	Abdul Marzouk (KSA)	6725 pts	Houssem Abdellatif (EGY)	6648 pts

=== Women ===
Women's competition played between 25 and 27 June 1998 in Damascus, Syria.

Event	Gold		Silver		Bronze	
100 metres	Karima Meskin Saad (EGY)	11.78	Awatef Hamrouni (TUN)	11.93	Wafa Mubarak (EGY)	11.95
200 metres	Karima Meskin Saad (EGY)	24.1	Awatef Hamrouni (TUN)	25.0	Wafa Mubarak (EGY)	25.4
400 metres	Karima Meskin Saad (EGY)	55.5	Abir Nakhli (TUN)	57.2	Ibtissem Fathy (EGY)	58.8
800 metres	Abir Nakhli (TUN)	2:10.8	Nadia Hamdy (EGY)	2:17.6	Natalia Farran (LIB)	2:20.4
1500 metres	Abir Nakhli (TUN)	4:48.9	Natalia Farran (LIB)	4:56.3	Nadia Hamdy (EGY)	5:03.3
5000 metres	Zainab Bakkour (SYR)	17:52.9	Mahassen Ajaj (SYR)	19:2.9	Samah Shaaban (EGY)	19:53.3
10,000 metres	Zainab Bakkour (SYR)	37:21.1	Mahassen Ajaj (SYR)	40:56.5	Najoua Ibrahim (EGY)	41:54.2
100 metres hurdles	Sheryne Khayri (EGY)	15.0	Rola Hambersmian (SYR)	17.31	Raouâa Tanta (PLE)	19.3
400 metres hurdles	Hela Abderrehim (EGY)	63.5	Shaïma El-Koumi (EGY)	65.0	Samar Danoun (SYR)	67.3
4 × 100 m relay	Egypt (EGY)	49.3	Syria (SYR)	54.5	Only two teams competed	
4 × 400 m relay	Egypt (EGY)	3:59.7	Lebanon (LIB)	4:07.5	Syria (SYR)	4:21.5
Half marathon	Zainab Bakkour (SYR)	1:27:1	Iman Hessine (EGY)	1:45:5	Mona Mohamed Mahmoud (EGY)	1:47:05
10 km road walk	Nagwa Ibrahim (EGY)	52:19	Rabab Ezzine (EGY)	57:51	Lamis El Majrissi (SYR)	1:04:19
High jump	Rim Abdullah (SYR)	1.55 m	Karin Buchakjian (LIB)	1.50 m	Sheryne Khayri (EGY)	1.50 m
Long jump	Monia Jelassi (TUN)	5.74 m	Nashoua Abdelhay (EGY)	5.41 m	Ghada Ismail Mustapha (EGY)	5.33 m
Triple jump	Monia Jelassi (TUN)	12.42 m	Ghada Ismail Mustapha (EGY)	11.50 m	Nashoua Abdelhay (EGY)	11.11 m
Shot put	Wafaa Ismail Baghdadi (EGY)	14.78 m	Amel Ben Khaled (TUN)	14.64 m	Hanaa El Melegi (EGY)	13.64 m
Discus throw	Monia Kari (TUN)	48.87 m	Hanan Khaled (EGY)	43.60 m	Walae Ibrahim (EGY)	15.12 m
Javelin throw	Muna El Morsi (EGY)	39.49 m	Saoud Al-Hariss (LIB)	39.16 m	Salam Saïd (SYR)	38.00 m
Heptathlon^{[nb]}	Saoud Al-Hariss (LIB)	4306	Rania Abdelaziz (EGY)	3977 pts	Haniya El-Gameel (EGY)	3890 pts

- ^{nb} Only two women finished all events in the heptathlon.

== Medal table ==
=== Overall ===
Rank	Nation	Gold	Silver	Bronze	Total
1	Egypt (EGY)	11	11	15	37
2	Qatar (QAT)	10	6	5	21
3	Saudi Arabia (KSA)	5	7	4	16
4	Syria	5	4	4	13
5	Tunisia (TUN)	5	4	0	9
6	Sudan (SUD)	2	1	0	3
7	Algeria (ALG)	1	5	5	11
8	Lebanon (LIB)	1	4	1	6
9	Jordan (JOR)	1	0	1	2
9	Oman (OMN)	1	0	1	2
11	Kuwait (KUW)	0	0	3	3
12	Djibouti (DJI)	0	0	1	1
12	Palestine (PLE)	0	0	1	1
14	Bahrain (BHR)	0	0	0	0
14	United Arab Emirates (UAE)	0	0	0	0
Totals (15 entries)		42	42	41	125

=== Men ===
Rank	Nation	Gold	Silver	Bronze	Total
1	Qatar (QAT)	10	6	5	21
2	Saudi Arabia (KSA)	5	7	4	16
3	Sudan (SUD)	2	1	0	3
4	Algeria (ALG)	1	5	5	11
5	Egypt (EGY)	1	3	2	6
6	Jordan (JOR)	1	0	1	2
6	Oman (OMN)	1	0	1	2
8	Syria	1	0	0	1
9	Kuwait (KUW)	0	0	3	3
10	Djibouti (DJI)	0	0	1	1
11	Bahrain (BHR)	0	0	0	0
11	Lebanon (LIB)	0	0	0	0
11	United Arab Emirates (UAE)	0	0	0	0
Totals (13 entries)		22	22	22	66

=== Women ===
Rank	Nation	Gold	Silver	Bronze	Total
1	Egypt (EGY)	10	8	13	31
2	Tunisia (TUN)	5	4	0	9
3	Syria	4	4	4	12
4	Lebanon (LIB)	1	4	1	6
5	Palestine (PLE)	0	0	1	1
Totals (5 entries)		20	20	19	59
