= Athletics at the 1997 Arab Games =

Athletics at the XIII Pan Arab Games
- Dates: 13–17 July
- Host city: Beirut, Lebanon
- Venue: Camille Chamoun Sports City Stadium
- Events: 41
- Records set: 16 Games records

At the 1997 Pan Arab Games, the athletics events were held at the Camille Chamoun Sports City Stadium in Beirut, Lebanon from 14 to 17 July. The events were poorly attended, with the vast majority of seat in the stadium remaining empty even on the final day. However, the calibre of performances remained high in spite of this.

Originally scheduled for 1996, the games were delayed due to rebuilding efforts after war with Israel – efforts that were themselves hampered by Operation Grapes of Wrath, which targeted areas in Beirut one year earlier. Iraqi athletes did not compete for a second time running, due to regional opposition of its Invasion of Kuwait. At the games, drug tests came back positive for some athletes – a first for the competition. As a result of the rescheduling, the dates for the athletics somewhat overlapped with those of the athletics at the 1997 Mediterranean Games. Future Pan Arab Games were scheduled in the year before the Summer Olympics to avoid similar clashes of the regional events, which are attended by several of the same nations. The first day of the athletics was marred by disqualification of four sprinters (from Morocco and Algeria), who had pushed one another.

A total of 41 events were contested, of which 22 by male and 19 by female athletes. Three new women's events were introduced – the triple jump and the half marathon were entirely new, while the 3000 metres event was replaced by the 5000 metres (coming into line with global standard set at the 1995 World Championships in Athletics). The rest of the programme was similar to that of the 1992 Pan Arab Games, although racewalking events were dropped for both men and women on this occasion. The road races, held on the first day of the games, encountered traffic problems: men's bronze medallist Ahmad Adam was hit by the referee's car and a women's medallist complained that the general public driving on the same road had made her run difficult.

Morocco topped the medal table with thirteen gold medals. Qatar and Algeria each won eight gold medals, the former doing so entirely in the men's section and the latter being most successful in the women's competition. Baya Rahouli was the most successful athlete of the tournament, with the 17-year-old winning four golds in the women's section (100 metres, 100 metres hurdles, long jump and triple jump). Two other athletes won multiple individual titles: Ibrahim Ismail Muftah won a men's 200 metres/400 metres double and Nadia Zétouani won both the women's 400 metres flat and 400 metres hurdles events. The women's high jump was won by a 14-year-old, Hamida Benhocine of Algeria.

== Medal summary ==
=== Men ===
Event	Gold		Silver		Bronze	
100 metres (wind: +0.9 m/s)	Saad Al-Kuwari (QAT)	10.40 GR	Sultan Mohamed Al-Sheib (QAT)	10.43	Hamed Sadek (KUW)	10.61
200 metres	Ibrahim Ismail Muftah (QAT)	20.95	Mohamed Al-Houti (OMN)	21.18	Hamoud Al-Dalhami (OMN)	21.18
400 metres	Ibrahim Ismail Muftah (QAT)	45.50	Samir-Abel Louahla (ALG)	46.25	Fawzi Al-Shammari (KUW)	47.05
800 metres	Djabir Saïd-Guerni (ALG)	1:46.84	Mohammed Yagoub (SUD)	1:46.95	Mahmoud Al-Kheirat (SYR)	1:49.17
1500 metres	Azzeddine Seddiki (MAR)	3:36.95	Mohamed Suleiman (QAT)	3:38.59	Mohammed Yagoub (SUD)	3:38.68
5000 metres	Ahmed Ibrahim Warsama (QAT)	13:35.73 GR	Alyan Al-Qahtani (KSA)	13:41.11	Saeed Briwi (MAR)	13:48.21
10,000 metres	Mustapha Bamouh (MAR)	29:22.69	Alyan Al-Qahtani (KSA)	29:26.89	Lahcen Benyoussef (MAR)	29:28.83
110 metres hurdles	Mubarak Khasif (QAT)	14.17	Si Mohamed Boukrouna (MAR)	14.41	Ziad Abdulrazzaq (KUW)	14.41
400 metres hurdles	Mubarak Al-Nubi (QAT)	48.95 GR	Mustapha Sdad (MAR)	49.14	Zeid Abou Hamed (SYR)	49.68
3000 metres steeplechase	Saad Al-Asmari (KSA)	8:21.40 GR	Ali Ezzine (MAR)	8:25.51	Abderrahmane Daas (ALG)	8:28.69
4×100 metres relay	Oman (OMN); Ahmed Hodayeb; Jihad Abdallah al-Shiekh; Hamoud Al-Dalhami; Mohamed Saeed Askaree	40.36	Kuwait (KUW)	40.62	Saudi Arabia (KSA)	40.81
4×400 metres relay	Algeria (ALG)	3:05.59	Qatar (QAT); Ibrahim Ismail Muftah; Ali Ismail Doka; Sami Juma Suleiman; Abdulrahman Hassan	3:07.22	Kuwait (KUW)	3:10.81
Marathon	Tahar Mansouri (TUN)	2:28:19	Foula Seliman (EGY)	2:30:45	Ahmed Adam Saleh (SUD)	2:35:35
High jump	Fakhredin Fouad (JOR)	2.17 m	Abderrahmane Hammad (ALG)	2.17 m	Jean-Claude Rabbath (LIB)	2.14 m
Pole vault	Ahmad Abdulkarim (QAT)	5.22 m GR	Sameh Hassan Farid (EGY)	4.80 m	Waleed Al-Shamali (QAT)	4.80 m
Long jump	Younès Moudrik (MAR)	8.11 m GR	Abdul Rahman Al-Nubi (QAT)	7.66 m	Khaled Farham Al-Bekheet (KUW)	7.64 m
Triple jump	Salem Al-Ahmedi (KSA)	15.86 m	Mohamed Adam Mohamed (KSA)	15.67 m	Oussama Ibrahim (EGY)	15.54 m
Shot put	Bilal Saad Mubarak (QAT)	18.97 m GR	Khaled Suliman Al-Khalidi (KSA)	17.64 m	Dhiya Abdalrahman (EGY)	17.39 m
Discus throw	Sameh Mohamed El Hattab (EGY)	51.80 m	Rashid Shafi Al-Dosari (QAT)	51.60 m	Dhiya Abdalrahman (EGY)	50.44 m
Hammer throw	Cherif El Hennawi (EGY)	69.12 m GR	Hakim Toumi (ALG)	67.00 m	Naser Abdullah Al-Jarallah (KUW)	66.86 m
Javelin throw	Firas Al Mahamid (SYR)	72.56 m GR	Maher Ridane (TUN)	72.20 m	Ghanem Jaouhar (KUW)	70.74 m
Decathlon	Anis Riahi (TUN)	7506 pts	Rédouane Youcef (ALG)	7315 pts	Houssem Abdellatif (EGY)	6735 pts

=== Women ===
Event	Gold		Silver		Bronze	
100 metres	Baya Rahouli (ALG)	11.98	Fatima Zahra Dkouk (MAR)	12.05	Siham El Hanifi (MAR)	12.20
200 metres	Siham El Hanifi (MAR)	24.64	Saliha Hammadi (ALG)	24.96	Awatef Hamrouni (TUN)	25.35
400 metres	Nadia Zétouani (MAR)	54.98	Hanan Khiouich (MAR)	56.19	Nahida Touhami (ALG)	57.03
800 metres	Hasna Benhassi (MAR)	2:06.29	Samira Raif (MAR)	2:06.53	Abir Nakhli (TUN)	2:07.45
1500 metres	Samira Raif (MAR)	4:15.15 GR	Mouria Souad Banida (ALG)	4:16.16	Aarfa Khayra (ALG)	4:18.16
5000 metres	Zahra Ouaziz (MAR)	16:01.68 GR	Bouchra Benthami (MAR)	16:46.31	Souad Aït Salem (ALG)	17:04.85
10,000 metres	Fatiha Klilech (MAR)	35:29.31 GR	Zhor El Kamch (MAR)	35:36.09	Soulef Bouguerra (TUN)	36:25.48
100 metres hurdles	Baya Rahouli (ALG)	14.11 GR	Fatima Zahra Dkouk (MAR)	14.64	Naïma Bentahar (ALG)	14.80
400 metres hurdles	Nadia Zétouani (MAR)	58.58	Zahra Lachgar (MAR)	60.13	Nabila Jami (TUN)	64.07
4×100 metres relay	Morocco (MAR)	47.07	Algeria (ALG)	47.66	Egypt (EGY)	50.97
4×400 metres relay	Morocco (MAR)	3:43.14	Algeria (ALG)	3:44.37	Tunisia (TUN)	4:00.49
Half marathon	Dalila Mial (ALG)	1:26:40 GR	Sonia Agoun (TUN)	1:28.03	Amal Al-Matari (JOR)	1:29.02
High jump	Hamida Benhocine (ALG)	1.63 m	Karin Buchakjian (LIB) Zuheira Najrawi (ALG)	1.60 m	Not awarded	
Long jump	Baya Rahouli (ALG)	6.09 m	Nagwa Abd El Hay Riad (EGY)	5.95 m	Fatima Zahra Dkouk (MAR)	5.91 m
Triple jump	Baya Rahouli (ALG)	13.51 m w GR	Nagwa Abd El Hay Riad (EGY)	11.79 m	Alaa Abdulhadi (JOR)	11.27 m
Shot put	Wafaa Ismail Baghdadi (EGY)	15.70 m GR	Nada Kawar (JOR)	15.66 m	Hanan Ahmed Khaled (EGY)	14.96 m
Discus throw	Nada Kawar (JOR)	51.18 m	Hanan Ahmed Khaled (EGY)	48.78 m	Jeannette Ayoub (LIB)	37.88 m
Javelin throw (old javelin model)	Saoud Al-Hariss (LIB)	40.22 m	Zahra Lachgar (MAR)	38.76 m	Pauline Makdesi (LIB)	36.58 m
Heptathlon	Shirin Mohamed Kheiri El Atrabi (EGY)	4268 pts	Naïma Bentahar (ALG)	4026 pts	Saoud Al-Hariss (LIB)	3992 pts

== See also ==
- 1997 Arab Athletics Championships
- 1997 World Championships in Athletics
- Athletics at the 1997 Mediterranean Games
