= Zahirudin Al-Najem =

Syrian hurdler (born 1977)

Personal information
- Nationality: Syrian
- Born: 11 January 1977 (age 49)
- Height: 1.84 m (6 ft 0 in)
- Weight: 75 kg (165 lb)

Sport
- Country: Syria
- Sport: Track and field
- Event(s): 400 m hurdles, 400 m
Medal record
Men's athletics
Representing Syria
Asian Championships
Bronze medal – third place	2000 Jakarta	400 m hurdles
West Asian Games
Silver medal – second place	2002 Kuwait	400 m hurdles
Pan Arab Games
Silver medal – second place	1999 Amman	400 m hurdles
Bronze medal – third place	2004 Algiers	400 m hurdles
Arab Championships
Silver medal – second place	1999 Beirut	400 m hurdles
Bronze medal – third place	2001 Damascus	400 m hurdles
Bronze medal – third place	2003 Amman	400 m hurdles

Zahirudin Al-Najem (Arabic: زهر الدين النجم; born 11 January 1977) is a retired Syrian hurdler. He competed in the men's 400 metres hurdles at the 2000 Summer Olympics. At continental level, he won one bronze medal in the 400 m hurdles at the Asian Athletics Championships and participated at the 1998 Asian Games. His personal best of 49.33 seconds is the Syrian indoor record for the 400 m event.

== Personal bests ==
Outdoor

- 400 metres: 47.18 NR (Beirut 1999)
- 400 metres hurdles: 49.67 (Jakarta 2000)

Indoor

- 400 metres: 48.32 NiR (Tehran 2004)

== Competition record ==
Year	Competition	Venue	Position	Event	Notes
Representing Syria
1996	World Junior Championships	Sydney, Australia	44th (q)	400 m hurdles	55.32
1998	Asian Games	Bangkok, Thailand	6th	400 m hurdles	51.04
1999	Pan Arab Games	Amman, Jordan	2nd	400 m hurdles	50.38
1999	World Championships	Sevilla, Spain	36th (q)	400 m hurdles	50.35
1999	Arab Championships	Beirut, Lebanon	2nd	400 m hurdles	50.66
2000	Asian Championships	Jakarta, Indonesia	3rd	400 m hurdles	49.67
2000	Olympic Games	Sydney, Australia	59th (q)	400 m hurdles	52.70
2001	Arab Championships	Damascus, Syria	3rd	400 m hurdles	51.02
2001	Mediterranean Games	Tunis, Tunisia	13th (q)	400 m hurdles	53.65
2002	West Asian Games	Kuwait	3rd	400 m hurdles	51.15
2003	Arab Championships	Amman, Jordan	3rd	400 m hurdles	51.21
2004	Pan Arab Games	Algiers, Algeria	3rd	400 m hurdles	50.55
2004	Asian Indoor Championships	Tehran, Iran	4th	400 m	49.33 NiR
