= 2001 Arab Athletics Championships =

12th Arab Athletics Championships
- Dates: 2–5 October
- Host city: Damascus, Syria
- Events: 44
- Participation: 15 nations

The 2001 Arab Athletics Championships was the twelfth edition of the international athletics competition between Arab countries which took place in Damascus, Syria from 2–5 October. A total of 44 events were contested. The women's heptathlon and half marathon events were not held, although one new women's event was held for the first time: the pole vault. The electronic timing system at the event failed during the competition and as a result some of the races were hand-timed. Results for all such hand timed events were recorded to the tenth of a second, rather than the hundredth of a second typically used in electronic times. The distance for the men's half marathon race was also mis-measured, falling short of the 21.1 km (13.1-mile) requirement.

== Medal summary ==
=== Men ===
Event	Gold		Silver		Bronze	
100 metres	Salem Al-Yami (KSA)	10.2	Jamal Al-Saffar (KSA)	10.2	Khaled Youssef Al-Obaidli (QAT)	10.3
200 metres	Hamoud Al-Dalhami (OMN)	20.7	Mohamed Al-Houti (OMN)	20.8	Hamdan Al-Bishi (KSA)	20.9
400 metres	Salaheddine Safi Bakar (QAT)	45.9	Hamed Al-Bishi (KSA)	46.3	Amin Badany Goma'a (EGY)	46.7
800 metres	Ibrahim Abdou Youssef (QAT)	1:47.3	Adam Abdu Adam Ali (QAT)	1:47.6	Hilal Al-Khosaibi (OMN)	1:48.0
1500 metres	Jamal Yusuf Noor (QAT)	3:52.72	Ismail Ahmed Ismail (SUD)	3:53.15	Abdulrahman Suleiman (QAT)	3:54.73
5000 metres	Mohammed Yagoub (SUD)	14:45.89	Nasser Suleiman (QAT)	14:46.50	Hussein Ibrahim Hussein (SUD)	14:56.54
10,000 metres	Mohammed Yagoub (SUD)	29:30.2	Ahmed Ibrahim Warsama (QAT)	29:34.5	Hamada Mohamed (QAT)	29:59.7
110 metres hurdles	Mubarak Ata Mubarak (KSA)	13.6	Mubarak Khasif (QAT)	13.8	Mohamed Issa Al-Thawadi (QAT)	14.1
400 metres hurdles	Mubarak Al-Nubi (QAT)	50.07	Bader Aman Abdulrahman (KUW)	50.32	Zahr-Edin Al Najem (SYR)	51.02
3000 metres steeplechase	Khamis Abdullah Saifeldin (QAT)	8:14.38	Saad Al-Asmari (KSA)	8:15.01	Hassan Ali Al-Asmari (KSA)	8:39.78
4×100 m relay	Saudi Arabia (KSA)	39.69	Oman (OMN)	39.86	Qatar (QAT)	40.24
4×400 m relay	Kuwait (KUW)	3:07.88	Saudi Arabia (KSA)	3:14.06	Egypt (EGY)	3:14.58
Half marathon (short course)	Ali Mabrouk El Zaidi (LBA)	1:01:4	El-Fouly Mostafa Salem Soliman (EGY)	1:01:5	Jumah Omar Al-Noor (QAT)	1:02:1
20 km walk	Yasser Abboud (SYR)	1:36:2	Hamed Farag Abd El Jalil (EGY)	1:37:5	Mabrook Saleh Mohamed (QAT)	1:42:3
High jump	Jean-Claude Rabbath (LIB)	2.07 m	Salem Nasser Bakheet (BHR)	2.04 m	Omar Moussa Al-Masrahi (KSA)	2.04 m
Pole vault	Fahid Bader Al-Mershad (KUW)	4.90 m	Abdulla Ghanim Saeed (QAT)	4.80 m	Ali Youssef Al-Shawareb (KUW)	4.80 m
Long jump	Said Mansour Al-Bekheet (QAT)	7.94 m	Abdulrahman Faraj Al-Nubi (QAT)	7.92 m	Hussein Al-Sabee (KSA)	7.86 m
Triple jump	Mohamed Abdulaziz Hamdi Awadh (QAT)	16.51 m	Salem Al-Ahmedi (KSA)	16.50 m	Khaled Farham Al-Bekheet (KUW)	16.01 m
Shot put	Bilal Saad Mubarak (QAT)	18.90 m	Ahmad Hassan Gholoum (KUW)	18.92 m	Ibrahim Al-Manai (QAT)	17.72 m
Discus throw	Rashid Shafi Al-Dosari (QAT)	62.43 m	Khaled Suliman Al-Khalidi (KSA)	54.74 m	Khalid Habash Al-Suwaidi (QAT)	54.46 m
Hammer throw	Naser Abdullah Al-Jarallah (KUW)	70.19 m	Yamine Hussein Abdel Moneim (EGY)	70.03 m	Ahmed Mohamed Abd El Raouf (EGY)	65.85 m
Javelin throw	Firas Al Mahamid (SYR)	77.55 m	Ali Saleh Al-Jadani (KSA)	71.35 m	Mohamed Ibrahim Al-Khalifa (QAT)	69.70 m
Decathlon	Ahmad Hassan Moussa (QAT)	7372 pts	Assem Mohamed Ali (KSA)	6824 pts	Mohamed El Morsi (EGY)	6580pts

=== Women ===
Event	Gold		Silver		Bronze	
100 metres	Awatef Hamrouni (TUN)	12.1	Nathalie Saykali (LIB)	12.5	Sarah Fawzi El Shami (EGY)	12.9
200 metres	Awatef Hamrouni (TUN)	24.98	Ines Abul Ala Mohamed (EGY)	25.16	Gretta Taslakian (LIB)	26.17
400 metres	Awatef Ben Hassine (TUN)	54.7	Ines Abul Ala Mohamed (EGY)	57.9	Gretta Taslakian (LIB)	59.5
800 metres	Abir Nakhli (TUN)	2:8.4	Nadia Hamdi (EGY)	2:12.7	Hind Musa (SUD)	2:14.9
1500 metres	Abir Nakhli (TUN)	4:36.66	Hind Musa (SUD)	4:40.37	Nadia Hamdi (EGY)	4:45.04
5000 metres	Soulef Bouguerra (TUN)	17:4.1	Zainab Bakkour (SYR)	17:21.9	Amal Al Matari (JOR)	17:59.4
10,000 metres	Soulef Bouguerra (TUN)	35:32.48	Zainab Bakkour (SYR)	36:23.88	Sara Ahmed Mohamed Hassan (EGY)	39:37.41
100 metres hurdles	Alaa Abdulhadi (JOR)	15.2	Rasha Sharifa (SYR)	15.6	Haniya Al-Gameel (EGY)	16.6
400 metres hurdles	Awatef Ben Hassine (TUN)	64.4	Mounira Saoud (SYR)	66.5	Haniya Al-Gameel (EGY)	67.9
4×100 m relay	Egypt (EGY)	49.10	Lebanon (LIB)	50.31	Jordan (JOR)	51.74
4×400 m relay	Egypt (EGY)	3:55.69	Tunisia (TUN)	3:58.97	Syria (SYR)	4:6.22
10,000 m walk	Najwa Ibrahim Ali (EGY)	51:21.2	Hanaa Sayed Higaz (EGY)	54:1	Thouraya Hamrouni (TUN)	55:17.2
High jump	Alaa Abdulhadi (JOR)	1.63 m	Haniya Al-Gameel (EGY)	1.60 m	Rasha Sharifa (SYR)	1.45 m
Pole vault	Nesrine Ahmed Imam (EGY)	3.20 m	Haniya Al-Gameel (EGY)	2.60 m	Falak Allou (SYR)	2.30 m
Long jump	Mona Sabry (EGY)	5.78 m	Ghada Ismail Mustapha (EGY)	5.68 m	Rania Estefan (LIB)	5.60 m
Triple jump	Ghada Ismail Mustapha (EGY)	12.40 m	Alaa Abdulhadi (JOR)	11.68 m	Souad Zeghib (SYR)	11.55 m
Shot put	Amel Ben Khaled (TUN)	15.80 m	Wafaa Ismail Baghdadi (EGY)	15.71 m	Heba Zaghary (EGY)	14.07 m
Discus throw	Heba Zaghary (EGY)	48.76 m	Faten Gafsi (TUN)	44.62 m	Noureen Ahmed Al Gharabawy (EGY)	44.00 m
Hammer throw	Marwa Hussein (EGY)	61.48 m	Rawdh Eïd Hessine (EGY)	52.12 m	Fatma Ibrahim (BHR)	29.22 m
Javelin throw	Aïda Sallem (TUN)	52.00 m	Muna Mustafa Youssef (EGY)	47.01 m	Hana'a Ramadhan Omar (EGY)	46.49 m

== Medal table ==
=== Overall ===
Rank	Nation	Gold	Silver	Bronze	Total
1	Qatar (QAT)	10	6	10	26
2	Tunisia (TUN)	10	2	1	13
3	Egypt (EGY)	9	13	13	35
4	Saudi Arabia (KSA)	3	8	4	15
5	Kuwait (KUW)	3	2	2	7
6	Sudan (SUD)	2	2	2	6
7	Jordan (JOR)	2	1	2	5
8	Syria	1	4	5	10
9	Lebanon (LIB)	1	2	3	6
10	Oman (OMN)	1	2	1	4
11	Libya	1	0	0	1
12	Bahrain (BHR)	0	1	1	2
13	Palestine (PLE)	0	0	0	0
13	United Arab Emirates (UAE)	0	0	0	0
13	Yemen (YEM)	0	0	0	0
Totals (15 entries)		43	43	44	130

=== Men ===
Rank	Nation	Gold	Silver	Bronze	Total
1	Qatar (QAT)	10	6	10	26
2	Saudi Arabia (KSA)	3	8	4	15
3	Kuwait (KUW)	3	2	2	7
4	Sudan (SUD)	2	1	1	4
5	Egypt (EGY)	1	3	5	9
6	Oman (OMN)	1	2	1	4
7	Syria	1	0	1	2
8	Lebanon (LIB)	1	0	0	1
8	Libya	1	0	0	1
10	Bahrain (BHR)	0	1	0	1
11	Jordan (JOR)	0	0	0	0
11	Palestine (PLE)	0	0	0	0
11	Tunisia (TUN)	0	0	0	0
11	United Arab Emirates (UAE)	0	0	0	0
11	Yemen (YEM)	0	0	0	0
Totals (15 entries)		23	23	24	70

=== Women ===
Rank	Nation	Gold	Silver	Bronze	Total
1	Tunisia (TUN)	10	2	1	13
2	Egypt (EGY)	8	10	8	26
3	Jordan (JOR)	2	1	2	5
4	Syria	0	4	4	8
5	Lebanon (LIB)	0	2	3	5
6	Sudan (SUD)	0	1	1	2
7	Bahrain (BHR)	0	0	1	1
8	Palestine (PLE)	0	0	0	0
Totals (8 entries)		20	20	20	60
