= List of Syrian records in athletics =

The following are the national records in athletics in Syria maintained by Syrian Arab Athletic Federation (SAAF).

== Outdoor ==
- Key to tables:

Awaiting ratification Record not kept by SAAF Not ratified or later rescinded by SAAF

=== Men ===
Event	Record	Athlete	Date	Meet	Place	Ref.
100 m	10.67 (+0.5 m/s)	Nabil Nahri	24 July 1980	Olympic Games	Moscow, Soviet Union	
100 m	10.4 h	Nabil Nahri	7 July 1980		Baghdad, Iraq	
200 m	21.45	Nabil Nahri	24 October 1979	Arab Championships	Baghdad, Iraq	
400 m	47.18	Zahr-el-Din El-Najem	30 June 1999	Arab Championships	Beirut, Lebanon	
400 m	46.7 h	Zahr-el-Din El-Najem	12 August 1999	Pan Arab Games	Irbid, Jordan	
800 m	1:47.45	Mahmoud Al-Kheirat	19 June 1998		Esch-sur-Alzette, Luxembourg	
1500 m	3:48.12	Mahmoud Al-Kheirat	30 June 1999		Beirut, Lebanon	
3000 m	8:21.39	Fayad Bakour	2 May 1998		Beirut, Lebanon	
5000 m	14:23.04	Salah Moustapha Habib	14 June 1990		Algiers, Algeria	
10,000 m	30:14.5 h	Farouk Khadour	10 October 1986		Yalta, Soviet Union	
Half marathon	1:11:38	Emad Muhbeddin	9 February 2007	Ras Al Khaimah Half Marathon	Ras Al Khaimah, United Arab Emirates	
Half marathon	1:11:38	Mohammad Mansour	20 September 2010	West Asian Championships	Aleppo, Syria	
Marathon	2:26:27	Ahmed Saker	6 December 1985		Latakia, Syria	
110 m hurdles	14.05 (+1.2 m/s)	Kheir El-Din Obeid	2 October 1991		Latakia, Syria	
400 m hurdles	48.87	Zeid Abou Hamed	20 February 1999		Sydney, Australia	
3000 m steeplechase	8:34.66	Salah Moustapha Habib	19 October 1991	Asian Championships	Kuala Lumpur, Malaysia	
High jump	2.36 m	Majd Eddin Ghazal	18 May 2016	IAAF World Challenge Beijing	Beijing, China	
Pole vault	5.00 m	Mohamed Malla Khalaf	12 August 2014		Damascus, Syria	
Pole vault	5.00 m	Mohamed Malla Khalaf	16 August 2015		Damascus, Syria	
Long jump	7.78 m (+0.2 m/s)	Mohammad Amin Al-Salami	20 July 2019		Hannover, Germany	
Long jump	7.88 m (+1.3 m/s)	Mohammad Amin Al-Salami	2 July 2022		Hechingen, Germany	
Triple jump	16.67 m (+0.5 m/s)	Mohamed Hazouri	29 June 2005		Almería, Spain	
Shot put	16.25 m	Malek Zarzour	6 August 2005		Eskişehir, Turkey	
Discus throw	54.15 m	Hamid Mansoor	11 June 2011	Bulgarian Championships	Sliven, Bulgaria	
Hammer throw	54.99 m	Saleh Satif	4/6 March 2010		Latakia, Syria	
Javelin throw	80.50 m	Firas Zaal Al-Mohammed	30 June 1999		Beirut, Lebanon	
Decathlon	6905 pts	Ali Mohamed Al-Dahan	13–14 August 1999	Pan Arab Games	Irbid, Jordan	
Decathlon	100m / Long jump / Shot put / High jump / 400m / 110m H / Discus / Pole vault / Javelin / 1500m; 11.28 / 6.80 m / 11.72 m / 2.01 m / 50.88 / 15.09 / 37.50 m / 4.00 m / 37.45 m / 4:38.77					
20 km walk (road)	1:32:04	Haytham Assaf	24 July 1987		Damascus, Syria	
50 km walk (road)						
4 × 100 m relay	41.58	Syria; B. Al-Terais; A. Rahal; A. Farzat; B. Saoudi	7 October 2009		Damascus, Syria	
4 × 400 m relay	3:11.10	Syria; Mohamed Amin Al-Ozon; Hani Mourhej; Zahr-el-Din El-Najem; Redouane Ifane	4 July 2001		Beirut, Lebanon	

=== Women ===
Event	Record	Athlete	Date	Meet	Place	Ref.
100 m	11.93	Mounira Al-Saleh	7 October 2009		Damascus, Syria	
200 m	23.78 (+0.6 m/s)	Ghada Shouaa	25 May 1996	Hypo-Meeting	Götzis, Austria	
400 m	53.55	Ghofrane Mohammad	10 September 2006		Algiers, Algeria	
800 m	2:10.3 h	Hala El-Moughrabi	25 June 1987		Damascus, Syria	
1500 m	4:26.70	Imane Mounir Al-Jallad	2 August 2004		Rabat, Morocco	
3000 m	9:55.9	Imane Mounir Al-Jallad	2 November 2006		Cairo, Egypt	
5000 m	17:03.6	Zainab Bakkour	16 August 2000		Damascus, Syria	
10,000 m	36:11.94	Zainab Bakkour	14 December 1998	Asian Games	Bangkok, Thailand	
Half marathon	1:45:30	Hailey Karroum	7 May 2023	Toronto Marathon	Toronto, Canada	
Marathon	3:25:28	Amal Katrib	10 June 2018	The Light at the End of the Tunnel Marathon	North Bend, United States	
100 m hurdles	13.72 (+0.3 m/s)	Ghada Shouaa	27 July 1996	Olympic Games	Atlanta, United States	
400 m hurdles	56.89	Ghofrane Mohammad	5 July 2016		Almaty, Kazakhstan	
3000 m steeplechase	11:17.79	Fatima Ghassan Rayya	26 September 2013	Islamic Solidarity Games	Palembang, Indonesia	
High jump	1.87 m	Ghada Shouaa	25 May 1996	Hypo-Meeting	Götzis, Austria	
Pole vault	3.10 m	Rihane Shiha	20 October 2010		Cairo, Egypt	
Long jump	6.77 m (+0.6 m/s)	Ghada Shouaa	26 May 1996	Hypo-Meeting	Götzis, Austria	
Triple jump	13.01 m	Fadoua Al-Boza	21 June 2009		Radès, Tunisia	
Triple jump	13.01 m	Fadoua Al-Boza	9 October 2009		Damascus, Syria	
Shot put	16.25 m	Ghada Shouaa	12 August 1999		Irbid, Jordan	
Discus throw	48.27 m	Hiba Omar	19 May 2017	Islamic Solidarity Games	Baku, Azerbaijan	
Hammer throw	50.24 m	Fatima Jeratli	27 July 2021		Hainfeld, Austria	
Javelin throw	54.82 m	Ghada Shouaa	22 August 1999	World Championships	Seville, Spain	
Heptathlon	6942 pts	Ghada Shouaa	25–26 May 1996	Hypo-Meeting	Götzis, Austria	
Heptathlon	100m H / High jump / Shot put / 200m / Long jump / Javelin / 800m; 13.78 (+0.3 m/s) / 1.87 m / 15.64 m / 23.78 (+0.6 m/s) / 6.77 m (+0.6 m/s) / 54.74 m / 2:13.61					
10 km walk (road)	58:47	Oroba Ammo	28 October 2011	Pan Arab Championships	Al-Ain, United Arab Emirates	
20 km walk (road)	1:48:59	Rania Mohammad Othman	14 March 2010	18th Asian Race Walking Championships	Nomi, Japan	
4 × 100 m relay	47.5 h	Syria; Soumaya Youhanoun; Sabiah Awad; Hala El-Moughrabi; Hiyam Saleh	23 July 1987		Damascus, Syria	
4 × 400 m relay	3:49.48	Syria; Ghofrane Mohammad; Fadwa Al-Boza; Hala Mashadani; Mounira Al-Saleh	13 September 2004		Damascus, Syria	

== Indoor ==
=== Men ===
Event	Record	Athlete	Date	Meet	Place	Ref.
60 m	6.97	Ahmad Rahal	24 February 2010	Asian Championships	Tehran, Iran	
200 m	23.47	Nabil Nahri	19 January 1985	World Championships	Paris, France	
400 m	49.33	Zahirudin Al-Najem	8 February 2004	Asian Championships	Tehran, Iran	
800 m	1:50.02	Mahmoud Al-Kheirat	9 February 2002	Armory Collegiate Invitational	New York City, United States	
1500 m						
Mile	4:54.52	Christian Hanna	24/25 January 2020	Finn Pincus Invitational	Winston-Salem, United States	
3000 m	9:53.52	Khaled Ghanat	3 February 2012		Mashhad, Iran	
3000 m	9:29.38	Christian Hanna	15 February 2020	VMI Indoor Classic	Lexington, United States	
5000 m	16:32.48	Christian Hanna	21 February 2020	JDL DMR Invitational	Winston-Salem, United States	
60 m hurdles	8.36	Bilal Al-Tares	26 February 2010	Asian Indoor Championships	Tehran, Iran	
High jump	2.28 m	Majd Eddin Ghazal	19 February 2016	Asian Championships	Doha, Qatar	
Pole vault	4.50 m	Mohamad Malla Khalaf	12 February 2009		Tehran, Iran	
Long jump	7.87 m	Mohammad Amin Al-Salami	29 January 2022		Berlin, Germany	
Triple jump	16.42 m	Mohamed Hazouri	8 February 2004	Asian Championships	Tehran, Iran	
Shot put	15.87 m	Zarzour Malek	22 February 2007		Tehran, Iran	
Heptathlon	4229 pts	Mohamad Malla Khalaf	13 February 2009		Tehran, Iran	
Heptathlon	60m / Long jump / Shot put / High jump / 60m H / Pole vault / 1000m; 7.27 / 6.54 m / 9.14 m / 1.60 m / 10.19					
5000 m walk	43:35.07	Wael Ammar	20 July 2016		Lucca, Italy	
4 × 400 m relay						

=== Women ===
Event	Record	Athlete	Date	Meet	Place	Ref.
60 m	7.54	Mounira Al-Saleh	31 October 2009	Asian Indoor Games	Hanoi, Vietnam	
200 m						
400 m	54.17	Mounira Al-Saleh	14 November 2005	Asian Indoor Games	Pattaya, Thailand	
400 m	53.79 X	Mounira Al-Saleh	26 February 2010	Asian Championships	Tehran, Iran	
800 m	2:40.00	Fadoua Al-Boza	10 February 2006	Asian Championships	Pattaya, Thailand	
1500 m	4:48.0 h	Zainab Bakkour	15 December 1997		Rasht, Iran	
3000 m	10:14.5 h	Zainab Bakkour	16 December 1997		Rasht, Iran	
60 m hurdles	8.85	Fadoua Al-Boza	27 September 2005		Pattaya, Thailand	
High jump	1.65 m	Rim Abdullah	13 February 2009		Tehran, Iran	
High jump	1.65 m	Rim Abdullah	2 November 2009	Asian Indoor Games	Hanoi, Vietnam	
Pole vault						
Long jump	5.58 m	Fadoua Al-Boza	25 September 2005	Women's Islamic Games	Tehran, Iran	
Triple jump	12.47 m	Fadoua Al-Boza	1 November 2009	Asian Indoor Games	Hanoi, Vietnam	
Shot put	12.46 m	Hiba Omar	13 February 2009		Tehran, Iran	
Pentathlon	3251 pts	Fadoua Al-Boza	10 February 2006	Asian Championships	Pattaya, Thailand	
Pentathlon	60m H / High jump / Shot put / Long jump / 800m; 8.99 / 1.52 m / 8.97 m / 5.36 m / 2:40.00					
3000 m walk						
4 × 400 m relay						
