= Bader Abdul Rahman Al-Fulaij =

Kuwaiti sprinter

Personal information
- Nationality: Kuwaiti
- Born: 14 June 1977 (age 49)

Sport
- Sport: Sprinting
- Event: 4 × 400 metres relay
Medal record
Men's athletics
Representing Kuwait
West Asian Games
Gold medal – first place	2002 Kuwait City	4 × 400 m relay
Silver medal – second place	2002 Kuwait City	400 m hurdles
Arab Championships
Bronze medal – third place	1999 Beirut	400 m hurdles
Silver medal – second place	2001 Damascus	400 m hurdles
Gold medal – first place	2001 Damascus	4 × 400 m relay
World Military Championships
Gold medal – first place	2001 Beirut	4 × 400 m relay
Gulf Cooperation Council Championships
Silver medal – second place	2002 Qatif	400 m hurdles

Bader Aman Abdul Rahman Al-Fulaij (Arabic: بدر امان عبد الرحمن الفليج; born 14 June 1977) is a Kuwaiti sprinter and hurdler. He competed in the men's 4 × 400 metres relay at the 2000 Summer Olympics.

Al-Fulaij won his first international medal at the 1999 Arab Athletics Championships, taking bronze in the 400 metres hurdles. He would go on to improve his position to silver at the 2001 Arab Athletics Championships, along with winning gold in the 4 × 400 m relay at that event.

Al-Fulaij qualified in the 400 m hurdles at the 2000 Asian Athletics Championships. He ran the sixth-fastest time overall in the semi-finals with a 51.42-second performance, qualifying for the finals. In the finals, he ran 51.53 seconds for 8th place.

At the 2000 Olympics, Al-Fulaij was seeded in the fourth 4 × 400 m heat. He ran the second leg for the Kuwaiti team, but they were disqualified after the race ended.

The following year, Al-Fulaij was selected for the Kuwaiti 4 × 400 m team at the 2001 IAAF World Indoor Championships in Lisbon, Portugal. With Al-Fulaij on second leg, the team placed 3rd in their semi-final and was one spot away from qualifying for the finals. The United States team that took the last finals spot ahead of them were eventually disqualified after Jerome Young admitted to use of performance-enhancing drugs. Al-Fulaij's heats time of 3:14.14 nonetheless set a Kuwaiti indoor record that still stands as of 2025.

At the 2001 World Military Track and Field Championships in Beirut, Al-Fulaij won the gold medal in the 4 × 400 m relay. The Kuwaiti team's time of 3:04.82 set another Kuwaiti national record that still stands as of 2025.

After winning 400 m hurdles silver at the 2002 Gulf Cooperation Council Athletics Championships, Al-Fulaij won two additional medals at the 2002 West Asian Games. He ran 49.58 seconds for the 400 m hurdles silver medal behind Hadi Soua'an Al-Somaily, and ran third leg on the Kuwaiti winning 4 × 400 m relay team in a Games record time of 3:06.51. Al-Fulaij also made an appearance at the 2002 Athletissima meeting, finishing 6th in the 'B' 400 m hurdles, and set his flat 400 m best of 46.85 seconds in July 2002. His flat 400 m best attracted the attention of Slovak authorities who were interested in recruiting Al-Fulaij for the Slovak Athletic Federation championships.

Al-Fulaij set his 400 m hurdles personal best of 49.13 seconds at the 2002 Asian Grand Prix meeting in Hyderabad, setting his third still-standing Kuwaiti record. He stopped competing after 2004.
