= Athletics at the 2004 Arab Games =

Athletics at the X Pan Arab Games
- Dates: 4 – 8 October
- Host city: Algiers, Algeria
- Venue: Stade 5 Juillet 1962
- Events: 45
- Participation: ? athletes from 20 nations
- Records set: 11 Games records

At the 2004 Pan Arab Games, the athletics events were held at the Stade 5 Juillet 1962 in Algiers, Algeria from 4 to 8 October. A total of 45 events were contested, of which 23 by male and 22 by female athletes. The host country topped the medal table having won a 16 gold medals and 34 medals overall. Second placed Morocco, with seven golds, had the greatest number of medals overall with a total of 35. Tunisia was third with sixteen medals in total, seven of which were gold. Eleven new Games records were set over the course of the five-day competition.

Baya Rahouli—an Algiers native and 2004 Summer Olympics finalist—was the most successful athlete of the Games, winning four golds (100 metres, 100 metres hurdles, long jump and triple jump) and setting two Games records. Seventeen-year-old Mona Jabir Adam Ahmed of Sudan won the 400 metres in personal best time, and also won a 200 metres silver. Todd Matthews-Jouda, a former American athlete, appeared to break the African record in the 110 metres hurdles, but this was later revised to 13.45 seconds – a Games record regardless. Hamed Hamadan Al-Bishi set a personal best for the 200 m Pan Arab title and went on to help both the Saudi Arabian relay teams to gold medals.

Algerian Nahida Touhami won two golds in the women's 800 metres and 1500 metres while long-distance compatriot Souad Aït Salem went one further, doing a 5000/10,000 metres double before taking a third gold in the half marathon. Amina Aït Hammou of Morocco won two silver medals in the women's 400 m and 800 m events. The women on the heptathlon podium all repeated their combined events medals in the individual disciplines. The event winner—Sarah Bouaoudia—set a Games record to win the high jump, runner-up Imen Chatbri took another silver in the javelin, while bronze medallist Zahra Lachguer was also third in the 400 metres hurdles.

== Records ==
In addition to the records set by medalling athletes at the 2004 Games, the following records were set by others competing in Algiers:

Name	Event	Country	Record	Type
Jalel Al-Ghabshi	Men's 110 metres hurdles	Oman	14.81	NR
Wajdi Bellili	Men's shot put	Tunisia	17.48 m	NR
Key:WR — World record • AR — Area record • GR — Games record • NR — National record

== Medal summary ==
=== Men ===
Event	Gold		Silver		Bronze	
100 metres (wind: -0.5 m/s)	Yahya Al-Gahes (KSA)	10.31 GR	Salem Mubarak Al-Yami (KSA)	10.39	Khaled Youssef Al-Obaidli (QAT)	10.42
200 metres	Hamed Hamadan Al-Bishi (KSA)	20.81	Malik Louahla (ALG)	20.84	Soleiman Salem Ayed (EGY)	21.00
400 metres	Hamdan Odha Al-Bishi (KSA)	45.04	Nagmeldin Ali Abubakr (SUD)	45.84	Ridha Ghali (TUN)	46.11
800 metres	Yusuf Saad Kamel (BHR)	1:46.12	Ismail Ahmed Ismail (SUD)	1:46.24	Amine Laâlou (MAR)	1:46.86
1500 metres	Youssef Baba (MAR)	3:46.32	Kamel Boulahfane (ALG)	3:46.36	Adil Kaouch (MAR)	3:46.70
5000 metres	Khoudir Aggoune (ALG)	13:24.73	Abderrahim Goumri (MAR)	13:25.53	Hicham Bellani (MAR)	13:32.41
10,000 metres	Khalid El Aamri (MAR)	29:51.47	Samir Moussaoui (ALG)	29:52.81	Mohammed Amyn (MAR)	29:58.73
110 metres hurdles (wind: 2.0 m/s)	Todd Matthews-Jouda (SUD)	13.45 GR, NR	Mubarak Ata Mubarak (KSA)	13.71	Aymen Ben Ahmed (TUN)	13.98 NR=
400 metres hurdles	Hadi Soua'an Al-Somaily (KSA)	48.77	Ibrahim Al-Hamaidi (KSA)	49.31	Zahr-Edin Al Najem (SYR)	50.55
3000 metres steeplechase	Brahim Boulami (MAR)	8:25.62	Khamis Abdullah Saifeldin (QAT)	8:38.68	Merzak Ould Bouchiba (ALG)	8:40.20
4×100 metres relay	Saudi Arabia (KSA); Salem Mubarak Al-Yami; Mubarak Ata Mubarak; Yahya Al-Gahes; Hamed Hamadan Al-Bishi	39.40 GR	Oman (OMN)	40.52	Morocco (MAR)	40.94
4×400 metres relay	Saudi Arabia (KSA); Ibrahim Al-Hamaidi; Hadi Soua'an Al-Somaily; Hamed Hamadan Al-Bishi; Hamdan Odha Al-Bishi	3:03.03	Morocco (MAR); Hamid Ben Hammou; Ismael Daif; Abdellatif El Ghazaoui; Amine Laalou	3:06.90	Algeria (ALG)	3:07.84
Half marathon	Abdellatif Meftah (MAR)	1:05:33	Saïd Belhout (ALG)	1:05:45	Al Mustafa Riyadh (BHR)	1:06:57
20,000 metres walk	Hatem Ghoula (TUN)	1:28:34.19 GR	Moussa Aouanouk (ALG)	1:29:39.31	Mabrook Saleh Nasser Mohamed (QAT)	1:34:04.56
High jump	Abderrahmane Hammad (ALG)	2.24 m	Salem Sayyar Ibrahim (KUW)	2.16 m	Kamel Rabia (ALG); Salem Nasser Bakheet (BHR)	2.11 m
Pole vault	Béchir Zaghouani (TUN)	5.20 m	Mohamed Karbib (MAR)	5.00 m	Mohamed Ali Chehabi (QAT)	4.90 m
Long jump	Issam Nima (ALG)	7.81 m	Mohamed Salman Al-Khuwalidi (KSA)	7.79 m	Tarik Bouguetaïb (MAR)	7.77 m
Triple jump	Mohammad Hazzory (SYR)	16.58 m	Mohammed Hamdi Awadh (QAT)	16.40 m	Salem Al Ahmedi (KSA)	16.24 m
Shot put	Khalid Habash Al-Suwaidi (QAT)	18.98 m	Yasser Ibrahim Farag (EGY)	18.65 m	Ahmad Hassan Gholoum (KUW)	18.20 m
Discus throw	Omar Ahmed El Ghazaly (EGY)	61.06 m	Sultan Mubarak Al-Dawoodi (KSA)	56.55 m	Jaber Salem Al Mhiri (UAE)	52.19 m
Hammer throw	Ali Al-Zinkawi (KUW)	72,22 m	Mohsen El Anany (EGY)	71.65 m	Saber Souid (TUN)	71.41 m NR
Javelin throw	Firas Zaal Al-Mohammed (SYR)	75.84 m	Mohamed Ibrahim Al-Khalifa (QAT)	70.47 m	Amar Muki (IRQ)	64.61 m
Decathlon	Hamdi Dhouibi (TUN)	7595 pts	Mohamed Ridha Al-Matroud (KSA)	7205 pts	Moulay Rachid Alaoui Hakim (MAR)	7098 pts

=== Women ===
Event	Gold		Silver		Bronze	
100 metres (wind: +0.1 m/s)	Baya Rahouli (ALG)	11.84	Basma Al-Eshosh (JOR)	11.97 NR	Sihem El Hanifi (MAR)	12.11
200 metres	Houria Moussa (ALG)	24.35 GR	Mona Jabir Adam Ahmed (SUD)	24.36	Nawal El Jack (SUD)	24.59
400 metres	Mona Jabir Adam Ahmed (SUD)	53.34	Amina Aït Hammou (MAR)	53.54	Nawal El Jack (SUD)	54.37
800 metres	Nahida Touhami (ALG)	2:34.48	Amina Aït Hammou (MAR)	2:34.49	Abir Nakhli (TUN)	2:34.95
1500 metres	Nahida Touhami (ALG)	4:35.85	Seltana Aït Hammou (MAR)	4:35.97	Saïda El Mehdi (MAR)	4:36.07
5000 metres	Souad Aït Salem (ALG)	16:02.14	Safa Issaoui (TUN)	16:19.56 NJR	Bouchra Chaâbi (MAR)	16'21"17
10,000 metres	Souad Aït Salem (ALG)	33:27.58	Malika Asahssah (MAR)	34:01.08	Fouzia Zoutat (ALG)	34:41.38
100 metres hurdles (wind: +2.0 m/s)	Baya Rahouli (ALG)	13.49 GR	Houria El Mohandis (MAR)	14.12	Naïma Bentahar (ALG)	14.14
400 metres hurdles	Nezha Bidouane (MAR)	55.98 GR	Houria Moussa (ALG)	57.51	Zahra Lachguer (MAR)	58.20
4×100 metres relay	Morocco (MAR) ? Nezha Bidouane ? ?	46.32	Sudan (SUD)	48.32	Iraq (IRQ)	50.70
4×400 metres relay	Morocco (MAR) ? ? Nezha Bidouane ?	3:38.24 AR †	Sudan (SUD)	3:39.53	Algeria (ALG)	3:50.25
Half marathon	Souad Aït Salem (ALG)	1:16:32	Fouzia Zoutat (ALG)	1:17:23	Nadia Ejjafini (BHR)	1:18:08
10,000 metres walk	Bahia Boussad (ALG)	53:39.9	Dounia Kara-Hassoun (ALG)	53:56.0	Michail Ali (SUD)	1:22:58.3
High jump	Sarah Bouaoudia (ALG)	1.80 m GR	Karima Ben Othmani (TUN)	1.72 m	Hamida Benhocine (ALG)	1.64 m
Pole vault	Syrine Balti (TUN)	3.90 m GR	Nisrine Dinar (MAR)	3.50 m	Ouahiba Hamreras (ALG)	3.40 m
Long jump	Baya Rahouli (ALG)	6.19 m	Latifa Ezziraoui (MAR)	6.03 m	Amel Regib (MAR)	5.88 m
Triple jump	Baya Rahouli (ALG)	14.49 m GR	Yamilé Aldama (SUD)	14.31 m	Latifa Ezziraoui (MAR)	13.59 m
Shot put	Amel Ben Khaled (TUN)	15.52 m	Wafa Ismail El Baghdadi (EGY)	14.98 m	Saliha Zekiski (ALG)	12.92 m
Discus throw	Monia Kari (TUN)	54.68 m	Amina Moudden (MAR)	52.64 m	Kalthoum Saadaoui (TUN)	51.09 m
Hammer throw	Marwa Hussein (EGY)	52.76 m	Hayat El Ghazi (MAR)	56.96 m	Mouna Dani (MAR)	53.75 m
Javelin throw	Aïda Sellam (TUN)	58.64 m	Imen Chatbri (TUN)	49.30 m	Lamia Hanouti (ALG)	44.45 m
Heptathlon	Sarah Bouaoudia (ALG)	5534 pts GR	Imen Chatbri (TUN)	5084 pts NR	Zahra Lachguer (MAR)	4965 pts

- AR † = Arab record

== Medal table ==
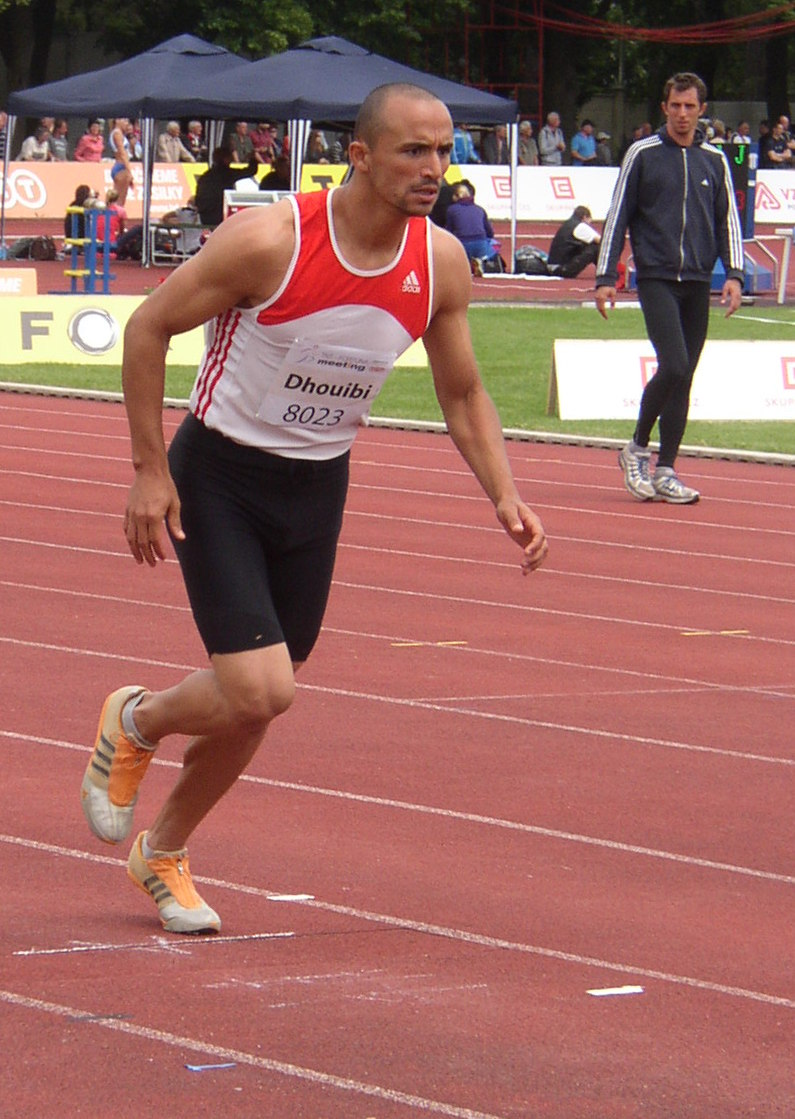
Hamdi Dhouibi won the decathlon gold for Tunisia.

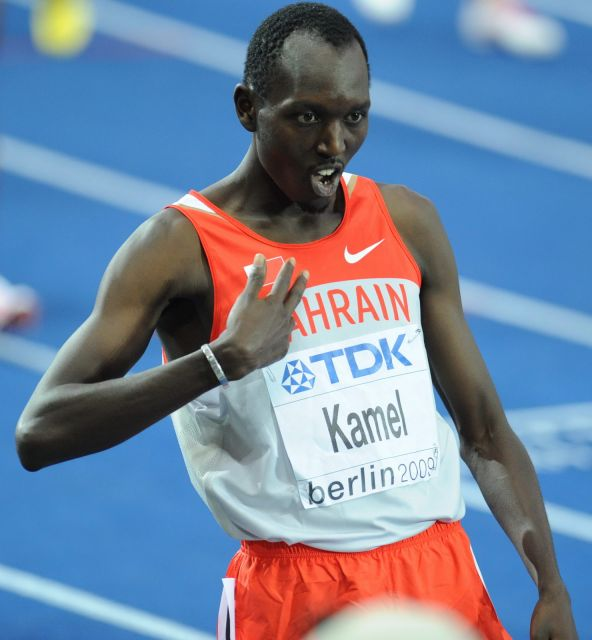
Former Kenyan Yusuf Saad Kamel took the 800 m gold for Bahrain.

* Host nation (Algeria)

Rank	Nation	Gold	Silver	Bronze	Total
1	Algeria*	16	8	10	34
2	Morocco	7	12	15	34
3	Tunisia	7	4	5	16
4	Saudi Arabia	6	6	1	13
5	Sudan	2	6	3	11
6	Egypt	2	3	1	6
7	Syria	2	0	1	3
8	Qatar	1	3	3	7
9	Kuwait	1	1	1	3
10	Bahrain	1	0	3	4
11	Jordan	0	1	0	1
11	Oman	0	1	0	1
13	Iraq	0	0	2	2
14	United Arab Emirates	0	0	1	1
Totals (14 entries)		45	45	46	136

== Participation ==
A total of 20 countries were represented in the athletics competition. Of the countries which had previously competed at the Pan Arab Games, Somalia and Comoros were the two nations which were not represented in the competition.

- Algeria
- Bahrain
- Djibouti
- Egypt
- Iraq
- Jordan
- Kuwait
- Lebanon
- Libya
- Mauritania
- Morocco
- Oman
- Palestine
- Qatar
- Saudi Arabia
- Sudan
- Syria
- Tunisia
- United Arab Emirates
- Yemen
