= Ibrahim Al-Asiri Yahya =

Saudi Arabian middle-distance runner

Personal information
- Nationality: Saudi Arabian
- Born: 26 October 1965 (age 61)

Sport
- Sport: Middle-distance running
- Event: Steeplechase
Medal record
Men's athletics
Representing Saudi Arabia
Arab Championships
Bronze medal – third place	1999 Beirut	3000 m s'chase
Gulf Cooperation Council Championships
Gold medal – first place	1996 Kuwait City	3000 m s'chase

Ibrahim Dahman Al-Asiri Yahya (Arabic: ابراهيم دهمان العسيري يحيى; born 26 October 1965) is a Saudi Arabian middle-distance runner. He competed in the men's 3000 metres steeplechase at the 1996 Summer Olympics.

In June 1996, Yahya ran a 2000 metres time of 5:07.94 to place 8th at the 1996 Josef Odložil Memorial. The following month, he ran his 3000 metres steeplechase personal best of 8:30.43 minutes at the KBC Night of Athletics to finish 6th.

At the 1996 Olympics, Yahya ran 8:46.37 to place 11th in his steeplechase heat, failing to advance to the semi-finals by two places. Yahya did win a steeplechase gold medal that year at the Gulf Cooperation Council Athletics Championships, running 8:57.41.

The following year, Yahya placed 7th in the steeplechase at the 1997 Cottbus Meeting Erdgas in Cottbus, Germany.

In 1999, Yahya won the steeplechase bronze medal at the 1999 Arab Athletics Championships in Beirut, Lebanon.
