= 2003 Arab Athletics Championships =

13th Arab Athletics Championships
- Dates: 5–9 September
- Host city: Amman, Jordan
- Events: 46
- Participation: 15 nations

The 2003 Arab Athletics Championships was the thirteenth edition of the international athletics competition between Arab countries which took place in Amman, Jordan from 5–9 September.

== Medal summary ==
=== Men ===
Event	Gold		Silver		Bronze	
100 metres (Wind: +2.7 m/s)	Salem Al-Yami (KSA)	10.18	Mohammed Farhan Khalifa (BHR)	10.20	Khalil Al-Hanahneh (JOR)	10.24
200 metres	Fawzi Al-Shammari (KUW)	20.41	Hamed Al-Bishi (KSA)	20.69	Nagmeldin Ali Abubakr (SUD)	20.93
400 metres	Fawzi Al-Shammari (KUW)	44.93	Nagmeldin Ali Abubakr (SUD)	45.43	Adem Hecini (ALG)	45.63
800 metres	Ismail Ahmed Ismail (SUD)	1:46.76	Adam Abdu Adam Ali (QAT)	1:47.52	Rashid Ramzi (BHR)	1:47.56
1500 metres	Rashid Ramzi (BHR)	3:53.18	Tarek Boukensa (ALG)	3:53.24	Abubaker Ali Kamal (QAT)	3:54.68
5000 metres	Khoudir Aggoune (ALG)	13:59.02	Abdulaziz Abdelrahman Al-Ameeri (QAT)	13:59.04	Abdelhak Zakaria (BHR)	14:04.07
10,000 metres	Dawood Saadoun (QAT)	31:07.10	Abdelhak Zakaria (BHR)	31:07.82	Saud Al Thubaiti (KSA)	31:15.34
110 metres hurdles (Wind: +2.9 m/s)	Mubarak Ata Mubarak (KSA)	13.71	Mubarak Al-Mabadi (KSA)	13.99	Mohamed Issa Al-Thawadi (QAT)	14.11
400 metres hurdles	Mubarak Al-Nubi (QAT)	49.66	Ibrahim Al-Hamaidi (KSA)	50.05	Zahr-el-Din El-Najem (SYR)	51.21
3000 metres steeplechase	Khamis Abdullah Saifeldin (QAT)	8:40.90	Abel Yakut Juhar (BHR)	8:42.59	Abdelhakim Maazouz (ALG)	8:47.10
4×100 m relay	Saudi Arabia (KSA); Kalifa Al-Saker; Hamed Al-Bishi; Yahya Al-Ghahes; Salem Al-Yami	39.06	Qatar (QAT); Sultan Mohamed Al-Sheib; Khaled Youssef Al-Obaidli; Abdullah Khamis Al-Hamad; Saad Salem Al-Sofyani	40.10	Oman (OMN); Hamoud Al-Dalhami; Juma Mubarak Al-Jabri; Fahad Khamis Said Al Jabri; Mohamed Al-Shikeili	40.42
4×400 m relay	Saudi Arabia (KSA); Ibrahim Al-Hamaidi; Hamed Al-Bishi; Mohammed Al-Salhi; Hamdan Al-Bishi	3:06.67	Qatar (QAT); Omar Yasser Al-Haj; Salaheddine Safi Bakar; M. Y. Al-Haj; Masoud Khamis Rahman	3:06.09	Sudan (SUD); Nagmeldin Ali Abubakr; Adam Anouar Mohamed; Gamal Biro; Ismail Ahmed Ismail	3:08.86
Half marathon	Abdul Hamed Mohamed (QAT)	1:05:48	Al Mustafa Riyadh (BHR)	1:05:50	Ahmed Jumah Jaber (QAT)	1:06:14
20 km walk	Waleed Ahmed Al-Sabahy (QAT)	1:31:7	Mabrook Saleh Mohamed (QAT)	1:31:52	Yasser Abboud (SYR)	1:33:5
High jump	Jean-Claude Rabbath (LIB)	2.21 m	Salem Nasser Bakheet (BHR)	2.18 m	Mohamed Benhadia (ALG)	2.12 m
Pole vault	Rafik Fethi (ALG)	4.95 m	Abdulla Ghanim Saeed (QAT)	4.90 m	Hamad Al-Shehabi (QAT)	4.00 m
Long jump	Hussein Al-Sabee (KSA)	8.30 m (w)	Nabil Adamou (ALG)	8.07 m (w)	Abdulrahman Faraj Al-Nubi (QAT)	8.02 m
Triple jump	Mohamed Abdulaziz Hamdi Awadh (QAT)	16.55 m	Mohammad Hazzory (SYR)	16.50 m	Marzouk Abdallah Al-Yoha (KUW)	15.99 m (w)
Shot put	Bilal Saad Mubarak (QAT)	18.73 m	Khalid Habash Al-Suwaidi (QAT)	18.44 m	Sultan Al-Hebshi (KSA)	18.15 m
Discus throw	Omar Ahmed El Ghazaly (EGY)	58.30 m	Khalid Habash Al-Suwaidi (QAT)	57.56 m	Sultan Al-Dawoodi (QAT)	52.88 m
Hammer throw	Ali Al-Zinkawi (KUW)	72.70 m	Mohammad Al-Jawhar (KUW)	71.00 m	Samir Haouam (ALG)	70.85 m
Javelin throw	Walid Abderrazak Mohamed (EGY)	77.03 m	Mohamed Ibrahim Al-Khalifa (QAT)	73.33 m	Firas Al Mahamid (SYR)	71.88 m
Decathlon	Ahmad Hassan Moussa (QAT)	7377 pts	Mustafatah Hussein (EGY)	7276 pts	Mohammed Belmatroud (KSA)	6889 pts

=== Women ===
Event	Gold		Silver		Bronze	
100 metres (Wind: +3.3 m/s)	Ruqaya Al-Ghasra (BHR)	11.61	Baya Rahouli (ALG)	11.69	Houria Moussa (ALG)	12.01
200 metres (Wind: +3.5 m/s)	Ruqaya Al-Ghasra (BHR)	24.09	Gretta Taslakian (LIB)	24.13	Muna Jabir Adam (SUD)	24.45
400 metres	Muna Jabir Adam (SUD)	54.34	Gretta Taslakian (LIB)	56.16	Sara Arrous (ALG)	57.04
800 metres	Nahida Touhami (ALG)	2:05.83	Hind Musa (SUD)	2:10.96	Mashaer Ali (SUD)	2:12.96
1500 metres	Nahida Touhami (ALG)	4:25.6	Hind Musa (SUD)	4:34.3	Iman Al-Jallad (SYR)	4:48.9
5000 metres	Souad Aït Salem (ALG)	16:08.80	Nadia Ejjafini (BHR)	16:50.06	Nour Al-Bakour (JOR)	17:46.09
10,000 metres	Souad Aït Salem (ALG)	34:47.73	Zainab Bakkour (SYR)	36:39.2	Mashaer Ali (SUD)	37:3.94
100 metres hurdles (Wind: +3.8 m/s)	Naïma Bentahar (ALG)	14.25	Samira Harrouchi (ALG)	14.79	Basma Al-Eshosh (JOR)	15.64
400 metres hurdles	Diala El Chab (LIB)	62.81	Samira Harrouchi (ALG)	62.85	Ghadir Makhadmeh (JOR)	69.60
4×100 m relay	Algeria (ALG); Baya Rahouli; Sara Arrous; Sarah Bouaoudia; Naïma Bentahar	48.18	Sudan (SUD); Amal Jabara Sedou; M. A. Jabo; Nawal El Jack; Muna Jabir Adam	48.68	Lebanon (LIB); Gretta Taslakian; Nathalie Saykali; Reine Bejjani; Diala El Chab	48.76
4×400 m relay	Algeria (ALG); Nahida Touhami; Sara Arrous; Houria Moussa; Naïma Bentahar	3:50.42	Sudan (SUD); Hind Musa; M. A. Jabo; Nawal El Jack; Muna Jabir Adam	3:51.28	Syria (SYR); H. Mashadani; Munira Saleh; W. Al-Bashiti; Fadwa Al-Bouza	4:00.10
Half marathon	Nadia Ejjafini (BHR)	1:19:40	Zainab Bakkour (SYR)	1:24:58	Durka Mana (SUD)	1:40:43
10,000 m walk	Bahia Boussad (ALG)	51:01.1	Ghania Amzal (ALG)	53:24.3	Hanaa Sayed Higaz (EGY)	55:21.6
High jump	Amina Lemgherbi (ALG)	1.66 m	Karin Buchakjian (LIB)	1.63 m	Amira Abou El Ata (EGY)	1.55 m
Pole vault	Nesrin Emam (EGY)	2.70 m	Basma Al-Eshosh (JOR)	2.50 m	Only two athletes cleared a height	
Long jump	Baya Rahouli (ALG)	6.18 m	Mona Sabry (EGY)	6.00 m (w)	Souad Zeghib (SYR)	5.77 m (w)
Triple jump	Baya Rahouli (ALG)	14.02 m	Mona Sabry (EGY)	12.56 m	Noura Dallaty (SYR)	11.94 m
Shot put	Wafaa Ismail Baghdadi (EGY)	15.17 m	Heba Zachary (EGY)	14.19 m	Fatma Al-Zahraa (JOR)	8.09 m
Discus throw	Heba Zachary (EGY)	51.94 m	Wafaa Ismail Baghdadi (EGY)	34.93 m	Fatma Al-Zahraa (JOR)	30.67 m
Hammer throw	Marwa Hussein (EGY)	61.74 m	Rawdh Eïd Hessine (EGY)	53.80 m	Fatin Al-Bakhit (JOR)	18.83 m
Javelin throw	Hana'a Ramadhan Omar (EGY)	54.03 m	Ghofran Shamak (SYR)	39.76 m	Heba Zachary (EGY)	36.16 m
Heptathlon	Sarah Bouaoudia (ALG)	5107 pts	Diala El Chab (LIB)	4208 pts	Arwa Abu-Shabab (JOR)	3094 pts

== Medal table ==
=== Overall ===
Rank	Nation	Gold	Silver	Bronze	Total
1	Algeria (ALG)	14	6	6	26
2	Qatar (QAT)	8	9	5	22
3	Egypt (EGY)	7	6	3	16
4	Saudi Arabia (KSA)	5	3	4	12
5	Bahrain (BHR)	4	6	2	12
6	Kuwait (KUW)	3	1	1	5
7	Sudan (SUD)	2	5	6	13
8	Lebanon (LIB)	2	4	1	7
9	Syria	0	4	7	11
10	Jordan (JOR)	0	1	8	9
11	Oman (OMN)	0	0	1	1
12	Iraq (IRQ)	0	0	0	0
12	Libya	0	0	0	0
12	Palestine (PLE)	0	0	0	0
12	Yemen (YEM)	0	0	0	0
Totals (15 entries)		45	45	44	134

=== Men ===
Rank	Nation	Gold	Silver	Bronze	Total
1	Qatar (QAT)	8	9	5	22
2	Saudi Arabia (KSA)	5	3	4	12
3	Kuwait (KUW)	3	1	1	5
4	Algeria (ALG)	2	2	4	8
5	Egypt (EGY)	2	1	0	3
6	Bahrain (BHR)	1	5	2	8
7	Sudan (SUD)	1	1	2	4
8	Lebanon (LIB)	1	0	0	1
9	Syria	0	1	3	4
10	Jordan (JOR)	0	0	1	1
10	Oman (OMN)	0	0	1	1
12	Iraq (IRQ)	0	0	0	0
12	Libya	0	0	0	0
12	Palestine (PLE)	0	0	0	0
12	Yemen (YEM)	0	0	0	0
Totals (15 entries)		23	23	23	69

=== Women ===
Rank	Nation	Gold	Silver	Bronze	Total
1	Algeria (ALG)	12	4	2	18
2	Egypt (EGY)	5	5	3	13
3	Bahrain (BHR)	3	1	0	4
4	Sudan (SUD)	1	4	4	9
5	Lebanon (LIB)	1	4	1	6
6	Syria	0	3	4	7
7	Jordan (JOR)	0	1	7	8
Totals (7 entries)		22	22	21	65
