= 2000 Asian Athletics Championships – Men's 400 metres hurdles =

The men's 400 metres hurdles event at the 2000 Asian Athletics Championships was held in Jakarta, Indonesia on 29–31 August.

== Medalists ==
| Gold | Silver | Bronze |
|---|---|---|
| Hadi Soua'an Al-Somaily; Saudi Arabia | Harijan Ratnayake; Sri Lanka | Zahr-el-Din El-Najem; Syria |

== Results ==
=== Heats ===
| Rank | Heat | Name | Nationality | Time | Notes |
|---|---|---|---|---|---|
| 1 | 2 | Hadi Soua'an Al-Somaily | Saudi Arabia | 49.94 | Q |
| 2 | 1 | Harijan Ratnayake | Sri Lanka | 50.23 | Q |
| 3 | 1 | Tan Chunhua | China | 50.50 | Q |
| 4 | 2 | Yoshihiro Chiba | Japan | 50.57 | Q |
| 5 | 1 | Erkin Isakov | Uzbekistan | 51.30 | Q |
| 6 | 1 | Bader Aman Abdulrahman | Kuwait | 51.42 | q |
| 6 | 2 | Zahr-el-Din El-Najem | Syria | 51.42 | Q |
| 8 | 1 | Lin Chin-Fu | Chinese Taipei | 51.76 | q |
| 9 | 2 | Majid Furootania | Iran | 51.99 | |
| 10 | 2 | Chen Tien-Wen | Chinese Taipei | 53.15 | |
| 11 | 2 | Purba Zulkarnaen | Indonesia | 53.50 | |
| 12 | 2 | Lee Doo-Yeon | South Korea | 53.57 | |
| 13 | 1 | Baymurad Ashimuradov | Turkmenistan | 54.51 | |
| 14 | 1 | Saleh Abu Ayesh | Saudi Arabia | 55.75 | |

=== Final ===
| Rank | Name | Nationality | Time | Notes |
|---|---|---|---|---|
| 1st place, gold medalist(s) | Hadi Soua'an Al-Somaily | Saudi Arabia | 49.13 | |
| 2nd place, silver medalist(s) | Harijan Ratnayake | Sri Lanka | 49.44 | NR |
| 3rd place, bronze medalist(s) | Zahr-el-Din El-Najem | Syria | 49.67 | |
| 4 | Tan Chunhua | China | 50.04 | |
| 5 | Yoshihiro Chiba | Japan | 50.96 | |
| 6 | Lin Chin-Fu | Chinese Taipei | 51.06 | |
| 7 | Erkin Isakov | Uzbekistan | 51.27 | |
| 8 | Bader Aman Abdulrahman | Kuwait | 51.53 | |
