= Nada Kawar =

Jordanian shot putter

Medal record

Women's athletics

Representing Jordan

Asian Championships
Gold medal – first place	2000 Jakarta	Shot put

Nada Mufid Kawar (born 23 November 1975) is a retired Jordanian athlete who specialised in the shot put. She represented her country at the 1996 and 2000 Summer Olympics, as well as two World Championships, however, without qualifying for the final rounds. She holds multiple national records.

Kawar was an All-American thrower for the UCLA Bruins track and field team, finishing 3rd in the shot put at the 1996 NCAA Division I Indoor Track and Field Championships and 1998 NCAA Division I Outdoor Track and Field Championships.

== Competition record ==
Year	Competition	Venue	Position	Event	Notes
Representing Jordan
1996	Olympic Games	Atlanta, United States	24th (q)	Shot put	15.28 m
1997	Pan Arab Games	Beirut, Lebanon	1st	Discus throw	51.18 m
1997	Pan Arab Games	Beirut, Lebanon	2nd	Shot put	15.66 m
1997	World Championships	Athens, Greece	24th (q)	Shot put	15.76 m
1999	Pan Arab Games	Amman, Jordan	1st	Shot put	17.33 m
1999	Pan Arab Games	Amman, Jordan	1st	Discus throw	57.52 m
1999	World Championships	Seville, Spain	25th (q)	Shot put	16.30 m
2000	Asian Championships	Jakarta, Indonesia	1st	Shot put	17.46 m
2000	Olympic Games	Sydney, Australia	25th (q)	Shot put	15.67 m

== Personal bests ==
Outdoor

- Shot put – 17.83 (Los Angeles 2000) NR
- Discus throw – 60.11 (La Jolla 1998) NR
- Hammer throw – 44.66 (Westwood 1998) NR

Indoor

- Shot put – 17.74 (Colorado Springs 1999) NR
