= Ibrahim Ismail Muftah =

Qatari sprinter

Medal record

Men's athletics

Representing Qatar

Asian Championships
Gold medal – first place	1989 New Delhi	400 m
Gold medal – first place	1991 Kuala Lumpur	400 m
Gold medal – first place	1993 Manila	400 m
Gold medal – first place	1995 Jakarta	400 m
Gold medal – first place	1995 Jakarta	4×400 m
Gold medal – first place	2000 Jakarta	400 m
Silver medal – second place	1991 Kuala Lumpur	200 m

Ibrahim Ismail Muftah Faraj (Arabic: إبراهيم إسماعيل مفتاح فرج; born 10 May 1972, in Doha) is a retired Qatari sprinter who competed mainly in the 400 metres. His personal best results are 20.96 seconds (200 m) and 44.66 seconds.

== Competition record ==
Year	Competition	Venue	Position	Event	Notes
Representing Qatar
1988	Asian Junior Championships	Singapore	1st	400 m	46.59
1989	Asian Championships	New Delhi, India	1st	400 m	45.60
1989	World Cup	Barcelona, Spain	9th	4x400 m relay	3:05.63^{1}
1990	Asian Junior Championships	Beijing, China	3rd	200 m	21.39
1990	Asian Junior Championships	Beijing, China	1st	400 m	46.91
1990	World Junior Championships	Plovdiv, Bulgaria	6th	400m	46.52
1990	Asian Games	Beijing, China	2nd	400 m	46.09
1991	Asian Championships	Kuala Lumpur, Malaysia	1st	400 m	45.66
1991	Asian Championships	Kuala Lumpur, Malaysia	2nd	200 m	20.96
1991	World Championships	Tokyo, Japan	5th (heats)	4×400 m	3:07.06
1992	Pan Arab Games	Damascus, Syria	1st	400 m	44.89
1992	Olympic Games	Barcelona, Spain	7th	400 m	45.10
1992	IAAF World Cup	Havana, Cuba	4th	400 m	46.48
1993	Asian Championships	Manila, Philippines	1st	400 m	45.55
1993	World Championships	Gothenburg, Sweden	5th (semi-finals)	400 m	44.85
1994	Asian Games	Hiroshima, Japan	2nd	200 m	20.88
1994	Asian Games	Hiroshima, Japan	1st	400 m	45.48
1995	Asian Championships	Jakarta, Indonesia	1st	400 m	44.96
1995	World Championships	Gothenburg, Sweden	— (semi-finals)	400 m	DNS
1996	Olympic Games	Atlanta, United States	7th (sf)	400 m	45.02
1997	Pan Arab Games	Beirut, Lebanon	1st	200 m	20.95
1997	Pan Arab Games	Beirut, Lebanon	1st	400 m	45.50
1997	World Championships	Athens, Greece	21st (qf)	400 m	46.12
1998	Asian Games	Bangkok, Thailand	5th	200 m	20.90
1998	Asian Games	Bangkok, Thailand	2nd	400 m	45.32
1998	Asian Games	Bangkok, Thailand	5th	4x400 m relay	3:06.51
1999	Pan Arab Games	Amman, Jordan	1st	400 m	45.7
1999	World Championships	Seville, Spain	23rd (qf)	400 m	46.04
1999	Arab Championships	Beirut, Lebanon	1st	400 m	46.15
2000	Asian Championships	Jakarta, Indonesia	1st	400 m	44.66
2000	Olympic Games	Sydney, Australia	28th (qf)	400 m	45.96
2000	Olympic Games	Sydney, Australia	–	4x400 m relay	DQ

^{1}Representing Asia
