= 1999 Arab Athletics Championships =

11th Arab Athletics Championships
- Dates: 21–24 October
- Host city: Beirut, Lebanon
- Events: 41
- Participation: 11 nations

The 1999 Arab Athletics Championships was the eleventh edition of the international athletics competition between Arab countries. It took place in Beirut, Lebanon from 21–24 October. A total of 41 events were contested, 22 for men and 19 for women. The men's and women's racewalk events were not held due to lack or participation, as was the women's heptathlon. Only Egypt, Lebanon and Syria participated in the women's events.

== Medal summary ==
=== Men ===
Event	Gold		Silver		Bronze	
100 metres (wind: +1.4 m/s)	Jamal Al-Saffar (KSA)	10.33	Saad Muftah Mubarak (QAT)	10.45	Hamoud Al-Dalhami (OMN)	10.47
200 metres	Hamoud Al-Dalhami (OMN)	20.94	Salem Al-Yami (KSA)	21.28	Mohamed Al-Houti (OMN)	21.47
400 metres	Ibrahim Ismail Muftah (QAT)	46.15	Salaheddine Safi Bakar (QAT)	46.57	Amin Badany Goma'a (EGY)	47.33
800 metres	Saleh Taib Fadallah (KSA)	1:50.47	Abdulrahman Suleiman (QAT)	1:50.13	Ahmad Al Bulawi (KSA)	1:51.18
1500 metres	Ibrahim Mohammed Adam (SOM)	3:49.27	Abubaker Ali Kamal (QAT)	3:49.66	Othman Mohamed Othman (KSA)	3:50.72
5000 metres	Khamis Abdullah Saifeldin (QAT)	14:21.73	Saad Al-Asmari (KSA)	14:24.10	Ahmed Ibrahim Warsama (QAT)	14:33.24
10,000 metres	Ahmed Ibrahim Warsama (QAT)	31:10.68	Mukhlid Al-Otaibi (KSA)	31:10.76	Kamal Kohil (ALG)	31:17.49
110 metres hurdles	Mubarak Khasif (QAT)	14.16	Nassim Qarbani Ibrahim (QAT)	14.27	Nader Hosny (EGY)	14.48
400 metres hurdles	Hadi Soua'an Al-Somaily (KSA)	49.14	Zahr-Edin Al Najem (SYR)	50.66	Bader Aman Abdulrahman (KUW)	51.06
3000 metres steeplechase	Saad Al-Asmari (KSA)	8:22.28	Khamis Abdullah Saifeldin (QAT)	8:22.54	Ibrahim Al-Asiri Yahya (KSA) (Note: Listed as Hassan Ali Al-Asmari in other sources)	8:59.70
4×100 m relay	Saudi Arabia (KSA)	39.45	Qatar (QAT)	39.61	Oman (OMN)	40.35
4×400 m relay	Qatar (QAT)	3:06.63	Kuwait (KUW)	3:07.64	Saudi Arabia (KSA)	3:08.47
Half marathon	Ali Awad (LIB)	1:10:37	Samer El Hariri (SYR)	1:15:47	Mahmoud Ayach (LIB)	1:17:43
High jump	Jean-Claude Rabbath (LIB)	2.20 m	Ali Mohamed Fadaak (QAT)	2.13 m	Omar Moussa Al-Masrahi (KSA)	2.13 m
Pole vault	Abdulla Ghanim Saeed (QAT)	4.85 m	Walid Abdellatif (EGY)	4.20 m	Yahya Saleh Al-Hashmi (OMN)	4.10 m
Long jump	Hatem Mersal (EGY)	8.15 m	Hussein Al-Sabee (KSA)	7.81 m	Khaled Farham Al-Bekheet (KUW)	7.49 m
Triple jump	Mohamed Abdulaziz Hamdi Awadh (QAT)	16.35 m	Salem Al-Ahmedi (KSA)	16.06 m	Mohamed Mohamed Adam (KSA)	16.02 m
Shot put	Bilal Saad Mubarak (QAT)	18.71 m	Khaled Suliman Al-Khalidi (KSA)	18.29 m	Ahmad Hassan Gholoum (KUW)	17.91 m
Discus throw	Rashid Shafi Al-Dosari (QAT)	56.93 m	Saber Salem Saeed Baiaha (UAE)	56.26 m	Khaled Suliman Al-Khalidi (KSA)	56.02 m
Hammer throw	Naser Abdullah Al-Jarallah (KUW)	61.97 m	Yamine Hussein Abdel Moneim (EGY)	61.43 m	Anwar Abdallah El-Fallah (KUW)	57.10 m
Javelin throw	Ali Saleh Al-Jadani (KSA)	70.11 m	Firas Al Mahamid (SYR)	69.34 m	Ghanem Jaouhar (KUW)	67.92 m
Decathlon	Ahmad Hassan Moussa (QAT)	7482 pts	Mustafatah Hussein (EGY)	7007pts	Ali Mohamed Al-Dahan (SYR)	6742 pts

=== Women ===
Event	Gold		Silver		Bronze	
100 metres	Wafa Mubarak (EGY)	12.57	Lina Bejjani (LIB)	12.76	Hala Ahmed Abderrahim (EGY)	13.12
200 metres	Wafa Mubarak (EGY)	25.69	Diala El Chab (LIB)	26.21	Samar Danoun (SYR)	26.68
400 metres	Diala El Chab (LIB)	56.99	Samar Danoun (SYR)	58.90	Hala Ahmed Abderrahim (EGY)	59.05
800 metres	Zainab Bakkour (SYR)	2:15.67	Ahlem El Wardi (SYR)	2:22.00	Mirvat Hamze (LIB)	2:22.28
1500 metres (hand-timed)	Zainab Bakkour (SYR)	4:45.1	Mirvat Hamze (LIB)	4:57.3	Liliana Al-Ayubi (SYR)	5:01.1
5000 metres	Zainab Bakkour (SYR)	17:37.85	Liliana Al-Ayubi (SYR)	18:51.98	Hoda Ahmad El-Awadi (LIB)	19:30.58
10,000 metres	Zainab Bakkour (SYR)	38:29.03	Liliana Al-Ayubi (SYR)	39:16.69	Hoda Ahmad El-Awadi (LIB)	42:33.65
100 metres hurdles	Hagar Mohamed Galal (EGY)	14.97	Manar Mohamed (EGY)	15.12	Rola Hambersmian (SYR)	15.86
400 metres hurdles	Diala El Chab (LIB)	61.65	Hala Ahmed Abderrahim (EGY)	61.85	Samar Danoun (SYR)	64.23
4×100 m relay	Egypt (EGY)	50.19	Lebanon (LIB)	51.16	Syria (SYR)	53.50
4×400 m relay	Egypt (EGY)	4:04.85	Syria (SYR)	4:07.90	Lebanon (LIB)	4:44.27
Half marathon	Zainab Bakkour (SYR)	1:31:46	Liliana Al-Ayubi (SYR)	1:43:50	Hoda Ahmad El-Awadi (LIB)	1:44:00
High jump	Manar Mohamed (EGY)	1.69 m	Rola Hambersmian (SYR)	1.69 m	Karin Buchakjian (LIB)	1.63 m
Long jump	Mona Sabry (EGY)	5.90 m	Ghada Ismail Mustapha (EGY)	5.49 m	Rola Hambersmian (SYR)	5.39 m
Triple jump	Ghada Ismail Mustapha (EGY)	12.13 m	Mona Sabry (EGY)	12.08 m	Rola Hambersmian (SYR)	11.01 m
Shot put	Wafaa Ismail Baghdadi (EGY)	15.26 m	Hanaa El Melegi (EGY)	12.27 m	Rola Hambersmian (SYR)	10.20 m
Discus throw	Jeannette Ayoub (LIB)	40.04 m	Marwa Hussein (EGY)	37.43 m	Wafaa Ismail Baghdadi (EGY)	34.59 m
Hammer throw	Marwa Hussein (EGY)	56.60 m	Jeannette Ayoub (LIB)	32.22 m	Wafaa Ismail Baghdadi (EGY)	29.47 m
Javelin throw	Muna Mustafa Youssef (EGY)	45.84 m	Salam Saïd (SYR)	43.73 m	Ghofran Eshamak (SYR)	34.69 m

== Medal table ==
=== Overall ===
Rank	Nation	Gold	Silver	Bronze	Total
1	Egypt (EGY)	12	9	6	27
2	Qatar (QAT)	10	8	1	19
3	Saudi Arabia (KSA)	6	6	7	19
4	Syria	5	11	10	26
5	Lebanon (LIB)	5	5	7	17
6	Kuwait (KUW)	1	1	5	7
7	Oman (OMN)	1	0	4	5
8	Somalia (SOM)	1	0	0	1
9	United Arab Emirates (UAE)	0	1	0	1
10	Algeria (ALG)	0	0	1	1
11	Sudan (SUD)	0	0	0	0
Totals (11 entries)		41	41	41	123

=== Men ===
Rank	Nation	Gold	Silver	Bronze	Total
1	Qatar (QAT)	10	8	1	19
2	Saudi Arabia (KSA)	6	6	7	19
3	Lebanon (LIB)	2	0	1	3
4	Egypt (EGY)	1	3	2	6
5	Kuwait (KUW)	1	1	5	7
6	Oman (OMN)	1	0	4	5
7	Somalia (SOM)	1	0	0	1
8	Syria	0	3	1	4
9	United Arab Emirates (UAE)	0	1	0	1
10	Algeria (ALG)	0	0	1	1
11	Sudan (SUD)	0	0	0	0
Totals (11 entries)		22	22	22	66

=== Women ===
Rank	Nation	Gold	Silver	Bronze	Total
1	Egypt (EGY)	11	6	4	21
2	Syria	5	8	9	22
3	Lebanon (LIB)	3	5	6	14
Totals (3 entries)		19	19	19	57
