= Jean-Claude Rabbath =

Lebanese high jumper (born 1977)

Personal information
- Born: 12 July 1977 (age 49) Beirut, Lebanon

Sport
- Sport: Track and field
Medal record
Representing Lebanon
Asian Games
Gold medal – first place	2006 Doha	High jump
Asian Championships
Silver medal – second place	2007 Amman	High jump

Jean-Claude Rabbath (born 12 July 1977) is a Lebanese high jumper.

He finished thirteenth at the 2005 Asian Championships, won the gold medal at the 2006 Asian Games and the silver medal at the 2007 Asian Championships. He also competed at the 1999 World Championships, the 2000 Olympic Games, the 2004 Olympic Games and the 2005 World Championships without reaching the final round.

His personal best jump is 2.27 metres, achieved twice in April 2004 in Beirut and in June 2004 in Bucharest. Rabbath was also a basketball player and won many titles, including the Asian Championship with Sagesse SC.

== Competition record ==
Year	Competition	Venue	Position	Notes
Representing Lebanon
1996	Arab Junior Championships	Latakia, Syria	2nd	2.04 m
1997	World Indoor Championships	Paris, France	–	NM
1997	Pan Arab Games	Beirut, Lebanon	3rd	2.14 m m
1998	Asian Games	Bangkok, Thailand	6th	2.15 m
1999	Universiade	Palma de Mallorca, Spain	6th	2.22 m
1999	World Championships	Seville, Spain	23rd (q)	2.20 m
1999	Arab Championships	Beirut, Lebanon	1st	2.20 m
2000	Olympic Games	Sydney, Australia	33rd (q)	2.15 m
2001	Jeux de la Francophonie	Ottawa, Canada	10th	2.10 m
2001	Arab Championships	Damascus, Syria	1st	2.07 m
2002	West Asian Games	Kuwait City, Kuwait	1st	2.10 m
2002	Asian Championships	Colombo, Sri Lanka	8th	2.10 m
2002	Asian Games	Busan, South Korea	8th	2.10 m
2003	Arab Championships	Amman, Jordan	1st	2.21 m
2003	Asian Championships	Manila, Philippines	6th	2.15 m
2003	Military World Games	Catania, Italy	4th	2.10 m
2004	Olympic Games	Athens, Greece	25th (q)	2.20 m
2005	Mediterranean Games	Almería, Spain	10th	2.14 m
2005	World Championships	Helsinki, Finland	23rd (q)	2.15 m
2005	Asian Championships	Incheon, South Korea	13th	2.10 m
2005	West Asian Games	Doha, Qatar	4th	2.10 m
2005	Jeux de la Francophonie	Niamey, Niger	8th	2.10 m
2006	Asian Games	Doha, Qatar	1st	2.23 m
2007	Arab Championships	Amman, Jordan	1st	2.23 m
2007	Asian Championships	Amman, Jordan	2nd	2.21 m
2007	Pan Arab Games	Cairo, Egypt	8th	2.05 m
2008	Asian Indoor Championships	Doha, Qatar	4th	2.18 m
2009	Jeux de la Francophonie	Beirut, Lebanon	6th	2.15 m
2010	Asian Indoor Championships	Tehran, Iran	3rd	2.17 m
2010	West Asian Championships	Aleppo, Syria	5th	2.15 m
2010	Asian Games	Guangzhou, China	11th	2.10 m
