= Mehdi El Ghazouani =

Moroccan long jumper (born 1976)

Medal record

Men's athletics

Representing Morocco

African Championships
Bronze medal – third place	2000 Algiers	Long jump

Mehdi El Ghazouani (Arabic: المهدي الغزواني, born 30 March 1976) is a retired Moroccan long jumper.

He won the silver medal at the 1995 African Junior Championships, and the bronze medal at the 2000 African Championships behind compatriot Younès Moudrik and Egyptian Hatem Mersal. He also competed at the 2000 Olympic Games without reaching the final. He became Moroccan long jump champion in 1995, 1996, 1998, 1999 and 2000. He also became triple jump champion in 1996 as well as 100 and 200 metres double champion in 1997.

His personal best jump is 7.96 metres, achieved in July 1999 in Casablanca.
