= Mubarak Khasif =

Qatari hurdler

Mubarak Khasif (born 13 November 1977) is a retired Qatari hurdler who specialized in the 110 metres hurdles.

As a junior he won the silver medal at the 1994 and 1996 Asian Junior Championships and competed at the 1996 World Junior Championships without reaching the final. Khasif won the 1997 and 1999 Pan Arab Games, won the 1995, 1997 and 1999 Arab Championships

His personal best time was 13.87 seconds, achieved in September 1997 in At Ta'if.
