= Abderrahmane Hammad =

Algerian high jumper

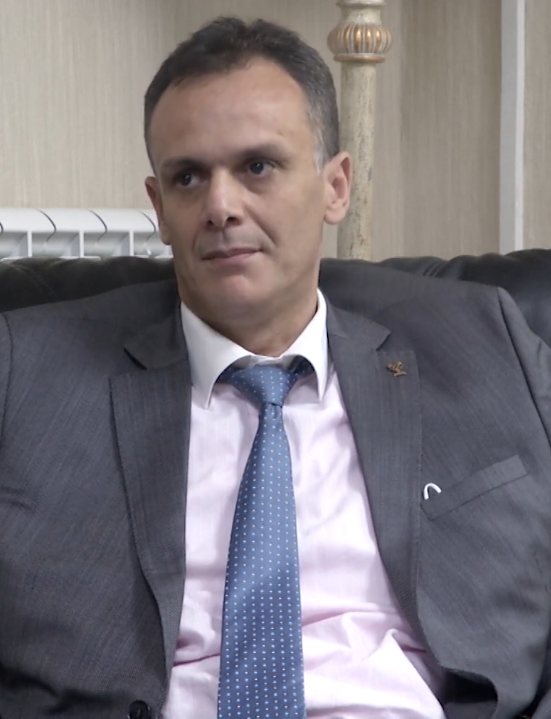
- Hammad in 2021

Personal information
- Born: May 27, 1977 (age 49) Dellys, Algeria
Medal record
Men's athletics
Representing Algeria
Olympic Games
| Bronze medal – third place | 2000 Sydney | High jump |
All-Africa Games
| Silver medal – second place | 1999 Johannesburg | High jump |
| Silver medal – second place | 2007 Algiers | High jump |
African Championships
| Gold medal – first place | 1998 Dakar | High jump |
| Gold medal – first place | 2000 Algiers | High jump |
| Gold medal – first place | 2002 Radès | High jump |

Abderrahmane Hammad Zaheer (Arabic: عبدالرحمن حمٌاد, born May 27, 1977) is the Algerian Minister of Youth and Sports and a former track and field athlete who competed in the high jump. He represented his country at the Summer Olympics in 2000, taking the bronze medal and made a second appearance at the 2004 Athens Olympics. His personal best of 2.34 m is the Algerian record for the event. He retired from the sport in 2010. In 2020, he became the President of the Algerian Olympic Committee. Hammad was appointed as minister on 16 March 2023.

== Biography ==
Hammad was born in Dellys. He began his international career as a junior in 1994 with high jump silver medals at the African Junior Athletics Championships and Pan Arab Junior Championships. He went on to win the African Junior gold medal the following year and then the Arab Junior title in 1996. He competed at the 1996 World Junior Championships in Athletics but did not make it into the final round. Hammad won his first Algerian title in 1997 and went on to take nine consecutive titles up to 2005. He had his first international success at senior level in 1997, taking silver at both the Pan Arab Championships and the 1997 Pan Arab Games.

He ascended to the top of the continental rankings at the 1998 African Championships in Athletics, where he secured the African title with a clearance of 2.21 metres. He was selected to represent Africa at the 1998 IAAF World Cup as a result and finished in sixth place. He improved further the following season and was runner-up at the 1999 All-Africa Games with a jump of 2.24 m and cleared 2.27 m to win the silver at the 1999 Military World Games. He managed tenth place at the 1999 World Championships in Athletics that year and improved his personal best to 2.32 m in Rovereto in September.

The 2000 season marked the peak of his career: first, he retained his continental title at the 2000 African Championships in Athletics in Algiers with a career best and championship record jump of 2.34 m. He then made his Olympic debut at the 2000 Sydney Games. He reached the final round and cleared 2.32 m – sixth other athletes achieved the same mark but Hammad secured the bronze medal through count-back. He won the high jump at the 2001 Mediterranean Games the following season and was ninth in the final at the 2001 World Championships in Athletics. He won a third consecutive high jump title at the 2002 African Championships in Athletics, took bronze at the 2002 IAAF Grand Prix Final and placed fourth for Africa at the 2002 IAAF World Cup.

He had a season's best of 2.30 m in 2003 but failed to make the final round at the 2003 World Championships in Athletics. He represented Algeria for a second time at the Olympics at the 2004 Games in Athens, but again failed to reach the final. He competed at the 2004 Pan Arab Games and took the high jump title with eight centimetres to spare over the opposition. The 2007 season was his final year at the top level of international competition: he was second to Kabelo Kgosiemang to take silver at the 2007 All-Africa Games and made a third and final appearance for Algeria at the World Championships, being eliminated in the qualifying stage.

== Competition record ==
| Year | Competition | Venue | Position | Notes |
Representing Algeria
| 1994 | African Junior Championships | Algiers, Algeria | 2nd | 2.09 m |
| 1995 | African Junior Championships | Bouaké, Ivory Coast | 1st | 2.12 m |
| 1996 | World Junior Championships | Sydney, Australia | 22nd (q) | 2.05 m |
| 1997 | Arab Championships | Ta'if, Saudi Arabia | 2nd | 2.17 m |
| 1997 | Pan Arab Games | Beirut, Lebanon | 2nd | 2.17 m |
| 1997 | Universiade | Catania, Italy | 16th (q) | 2.10 m |
| 1998 | African Championships | Dakar, Senegal | 1st | 2.21 m |
| 1999 | World Championships | Seville, Spain | 10th | 2.25 m |
| 1999 | All-Africa Games | Johannesburg, South Africa | 2nd | 2.24 m |
| 2000 | African Championships | Algiers, Algeria | 1st | 2.34 m |
| 2000 | Olympic Games | Sydney, Australia | 3rd | 2.32 m |
| 2001 | World Championships | Edmonton, Canada | 9th | 2.20 m |
| 2001 | Mediterranean Games | Radès, Tunisia | 1st | 2.25 m |
| 2002 | African Championships | Radès, Tunisia | 1st | 2.25 m |
| 2003 | World Championships | Paris, France | 22nd (q) | 2.20 m |
| 2004 | Olympic Games | Athens, Greece | 15th (q) | 2.25 m |
| 2004 | Pan Arab Games | Algiers, Algeria | 1st | 2.24 m |
| 2007 | All-Africa Games | Algiers, Algeria | 2nd | 2.24 m |
| 2007 | World Championships | Osaka, Japan | 36th (q) | 2.14 m |
