= Basma Al-Eshosh =

Jordanian sprinter

Personal information
- Nationality: Jordanian
- Born: 20 November 1977 (age 47)

Sport
- Sport: Sprinting
- Event: 100 metres

Basma Al-Eshosh (born 20 November 1977) is a Jordanian sprinter. She competed in the women's 100 metres at the 2004 Summer Olympics.
