= Samira Raif =

Moroccan long-distance runner

Personal information
- Born: April 4, 1974 (age 52) Casablanca, Morocco
- Height: 1.56 m (5 ft 1 1/2 in)
- Weight: 49 kg (108 lb)

Sport
- Country: Morocco
- Sport: Athletics
- Event: Marathon
Medal record
Women's athletics
Representing Morocco
African Championships
Silver medal – second place	2000 Algiers	4×400 m relay
Mediterranean Games
Silver medal – second place	1997 Bari	1500m

Samira Raif (born 4 April 1974) is a Moroccan long-distance runner. She competed in the marathon at the 2012 Summer Olympics, placing 73rd with a time of 2:38:31, a seasonal best.
