= Saad Muftah Al-Kuwari =

Qatari sprinter (born 1964)

Personal information
- Nationality: Qatari
- Born: 28 March 1964 (age 62)

Sport
- Sport: Sprinting
- Event: 200 metres
Medal record
Men's athletics
Representing Qatar
Asian Championships
Silver medal – second place	1985 Jakarta	4×100 m
Bronze medal – third place	1989 New Delhi	4×100 m
Bronze medal – third place	1995 Jakarta	4×100 m

Saad Muftah Mubarak Al-Kuwari (Arabic: سعد مفتاح مبارك الکواري, born 28 March 1964) is a Qatari sprinter. He competed in the men's 200 metres at the 1992 Summer Olympics.
