= Mohamed Babiker Yagoub =

Sudanese middle-distance runner

Personal information
- Nationality: Sudanese
- Born: 2 September 1977 (age 48)

Sport
- Sport: Middle-distance running
- Event: 800 metres

Mohamed Babiker Yagoub (born 2 September 1977) is a Sudanese middle-distance runner. He competed in the men's 800 metres at the 1996 Summer Olympics. Yagoub, who is an ethnic Fur and native of Darfur, has a nephew named Waleed Suliman currently running for the University of Mississippi.
