= Athletics at the West Asian Games =

Athletics was one of the sports at the West Asian Games, and featured on the programme at all three editions of the competition, in 1997, 2002, and 2005. The programme had only men's competitions in the first two editions before introducing women's events in 2005.

== Editions ==
Games	Year	Host city	Host country
I	1997	Tehran	Iran
II	2002	Kuwait City	Kuwait
III	2005	Doha	Qatar

== Medal table ==
Rank	Nation	Gold	Silver	Bronze	Total
1	Qatar (QAT)	18	16	9	43
2	Kuwait (KUW)	17	11	6	34
3	Iran (IRI)	15	18	22	55
4	Saudi Arabia (KSA)	7	9	9	25
5	Syria (SYR)	3	2	5	10
6	Jordan (JOR)	2	6	3	11
7	Bahrain (BHR)	2	1	1	4
8	Kyrgyzstan (KGZ)	1	1	0	2
9	United Arab Emirates (UAE)	1	0	2	3
10	Lebanon (LIB)	1	0	0	1
11	Oman (OMN)	0	3	1	4
12	Turkmenistan (TKM)	0	0	5	5
13	Iraq (IRQ)	0	0	3	3
14	Tajikistan (TJK)	0	0	1	1
Totals (14 entries)		67	67	67	201
