= Ali Saleh Al-Jadani =

Saudi Arabian javelin thrower

Personal information
- Nationality: Saudi Arabian
- Born: 30 May 1977 (age 49)

Sport
- Sport: Athletics
- Event: Javelin throw

Ali Saleh Al-Jadani (born 30 May 1977) is a Saudi Arabian athlete. He competed in the men's javelin throw at the 2000 Summer Olympics.
