= Arab Athletics Championships =

Event organized by the Arab Athletic Association

Arab Athletics Championships البطولة العربية لألعاب القوى
- Status: active
- Genre: sports event
- Date: midyear
- Frequency: biennial
- Inaugurated: 1977
- Organiser: Arab Athletics Federation

The Arab Athletics Championships (Arabic: البطولة العربية لألعاب القوى) is an event organized by the Arab Athletics Federation. It traditionally occurred every two years. It was not held in 1985 due to the schedule clash with the Pan Arab Games. However, due to the erratic scheduling of the games, both the athletics championships and games athletics competition have been held in the same year on several occasions since 1997. Typically, the championships is rescheduled to earlier in the year as a result. Women's events have been present on the programme since the second edition in 1979. The programme is usually combined although the women competed separately from the men for the tenth edition of the tournament, which was split between 1997 and 1998.

== Editions ==
	Year	City	Country	Date	Venue	No. of Events	No. of Nations	No. of Athletes			Winning Nation
	Year	City	Country	Date	Venue	No. of Events	No. of Nations	M	W	Total	Winning Nation
1	1977	Damascus	Syria	27–30 September	Tishreen Stadium	22	12	215	-	215	Iraq
2	1979	Baghdad	Iraq	23–26 October	Al-Shaab Stadium	32	12	200	20	220	Iraq
3	1981	Tunis	Tunisia	21–24 August	INEPS Ksar Saïd Stadium	39	16	270	60	330	Morocco
4	1983	Amman	Jordan	19–22 August	Al-Hussein Sports City Stadium	39	18	290	98	388	Algeria
5	1987	Algiers	Algeria	6–9 July	Stade du 5 Juillet	40	14				Algeria
6	1989	Cairo	Egypt	2–5 October	Cairo International Stadium	43	16			325	Algeria
7	1991	Lattakia	Syria	1–4 October	Al-Assad Stadium	39	13				Syria
8	1993	Lattakia	Syria	24–27 September	Al-Assad Stadium	40	14				Qatar
9	1995	Cairo	Egypt	26–28 August	Cairo International Stadium	45	15			500	Morocco
10	1997–98	Ta'if	Saudi Arabia	10–12 Sep 1997	King Fahd Stadium	42	15	210	80	290	Egypt
10	1997–98	Damascus	Syria	25–27 Jun 1998	Abbasiyyin Stadium	42	15	210	80	290	Egypt
11	1999	Beirut	Lebanon	21–24 October	Camille Chamoun Stadium	41	15			275	Egypt
12	2001	Damascus	Syria	2–5 October	Tishreen Stadium	43	15	250	105	355	Qatar
13	2003	Amman	Jordan	5–9 September	Amman International Stadium	45	16				Algeria
14	2005	Radès	Tunisia	15–18 September	Stade Olympique de Radès	45	14			235	Tunisia
15	2007	Amman	Jordan	18–21 May	Al-Hussein Sports City Stadium	46	17	271	156	427	Morocco
16	2009	Damascus	Syria	6–9 October	Tishreen Stadium	46	17	238	96	334	Morocco
17	2011	Al Ain	United Arab Emirates	26–29 October	Khalifa International Stadium	46	17			500	Morocco
18	2013	Doha	Qatar	21–24 May	Suheim Bin Hamad Stadium	46	18			368	Morocco
19	2015	Manama	Bahrain	24–27 April	Khalifa Sports City Stadium	44	21			700	Bahrain
20	2017	Rades	Tunisia	15–18 July	Stade Olympique de Radès	44	16			400	Morocco
21	2019	Cairo	Egypt	5–8 April	American University in Cairo	44	13				Bahrain
22	2021	Rades	Tunisia	16–20 June	Stade Olympique de Radès	46	14				Morocco
23	2023	Marrakesh	Morocco	20–24 June	Marrakesh Stadium	46	16			250	Morocco
24	2025	Oran	Algeria	30 April–4 May	Miloud Hadefi Stadium	23	12			224	Algeria

== Statistics ==
=== Wins by country ===
Overall points winners
Country	Winners	Second	Third	Total
Morocco	9	4	0	13
Algeria	5	2	3	10
Qatar	3	3	3	9
Egypt	2	4	7	13
Bahrain	2	2	2	6
Iraq	2	0	1	3
Tunisia	1	7	2	10
Syria	1	0	2	3
Saudi Arabia	0	1	2	3
Libya	0	0	1	1
Sudan	0	0	1	1

=== All-time medal table 1977–2025 ===
Rank	Nation	Gold	Silver	Bronze	Total
1	Morocco	147	141	109	397
2	Algeria	146	124	117	387
3	Egypt	133	147	116	396
4	Tunisia	115	112	99	326
5	Qatar	111	78	73	262
6	Bahrain	74	71	47	192
7	Saudi Arabia	63	73	70	206
8	Iraq	47	57	45	149
9	Kuwait	46	33	54	133
10	Syria	38	72	86	196
11	Sudan	32	33	28	93
12	Lebanon	17	23	35	75
13	Oman	10	22	27	59
14	United Arab Emirates	8	17	8	33
15	Jordan	7	16	43	66
16	Djibouti	7	6	11	24
17	Libya	6	7	9	22
18	Somalia	1	0	1	2
19	Palestine	0	1	2	3
20	Yemen	0	0	1	1
21	Comoros	0	0	0	0
21	Mauritania	0	0	0	0
Totals (22 entries)		1,008	1,033	981	3,022

== Championships records ==
=== Men ===
Event	Record	Athlete	Nationality	Date	Championships	Place	Ref.
100 m
100 m	10.04 (+4.1 m/s)	Femi Ogunode	Qatar	26 April 2015	2015 Championships	Manama, Bahrain	
200 m	20.32 (+1.8 m/s)	Abdelaziz Atafi	Saudi Arabia	4 May 2025	2025 Championships	Oran, Algeria	
400 m	44.68	Abdelalelah Haroun	Qatar	25 April 2015	2015 Championships	Manama, Bahrain	
800 m	1:45.09	Abubaker Kaki Khamis	Sudan	21 May 2007	2007 Championships	Amman, Jordan	
1500 m	3:33.81	Sadik Mikhou	Bahrain	20 June 2021	2021 Championships	Radès, Tunisia	
5000 m	13:17.97	Ayanleh Souleiman	Djibouti	27 April 2015	2015 Championships	Manama, Bahrain	
10,000 m	28:16.01	Hasan Mahboob	Morocco	6 October 2009	2009 Championships	Damascus, Syria	
Half marathon	1:02:21	Moustafa Ahmed Shebto	Qatar	21 May 2007	2007 Championships	Amman, Jordan	
110 m hurdles	13.35	Abdulaziz Al-Mandeel	Kuwait	24 April 2015	2015 Championships	Manama, Bahrain	
400 m hurdles	48.77	Abderrahman Samba	Qatar	4 May 2025	2025 Championships	Oran, Algeria	
3000 m steeplechase	8:14.38	Khamis Abdullah Saifeldin	Qatar	3 October 2001	2001 Championships	Damascus, Syria	
High jump	2.30 m	Mutaz Essa Barshim	Qatar	23 May 2013	2003 Championships	Doha, Qatar	
Pole vault	5.62 m	Seif Heneida	Qatar	1 May 2025	2025 Championships	Oran, Algeria	
Long jump	8.30 m	Hussein Al-Sabee	Saudi Arabia	8 September 2003	2003 Championships	Amman, Jordan	
Triple jump	17.01 m	Issam Nima	Algeria	23 May 2013	2003 Championships	Doha, Qatar	
Triple jump	17.26 m NWI	Yasser Triki	Algeria	18 June 2021	2021 Championships	Radès, Tunisia	
Shot put	21.15 m AR	Abdelrahman Mahmoud	Bahrain	16 June 2021	2021 Championships	Radès, Tunisia	
Discus throw	63.66 m	Omar Ahmed El Ghazaly	Egypt	21 May 2007	2007 Championships	Amman, Jordan	
Hammer throw	79.27 m	Ali Al-Zinkawi	Kuwait	28 October 2011	2011 Championships	Al Ain, United Arab Emirates	
Javelin throw	80.72 m	Ihab El-Sayed	Egypt	24 April 2015	2015 Championships	Manama, Bahrain	
Decathlon	7642 pts	Mohammed J.M. Al-Qaree	Saudi Arabia	8–9 October 2009	2009 Championships	Damascus, Syria	
Decathlon	100m (wind) / Long jump (wind) / Shot put / High jump / 400m / 110m H (wind) / Discus / Pole vault / Javelin / 1500m						
20 km walk (road)	1:23:15	Mohamed Ragab Saleh	Egypt	5 April 2019	2019 Championships	Cairo, Egypt	
4 × 100 m relay	39.06	Saudi Arabia	Saudi Arabia	8 September 2003	2003 Championships	Amman, Jordan	
4 × 400 m relay	3:04.93		Qatar	27 April 2015	2015 Championships	Manama, Bahrain	

=== Women ===
Event	Record	Athlete	Nationality	Date	Championships	Place	Ref.
100 m	11.33 (+0.1 m/s)	Bassant Hemida	Egypt	21 June 2023	2023 Championships	Marrakech, Morocco	
200 m	22.07	Ruqaya Al-Ghasra	Bahrain	21 May 2007	2007 Championships	Amman, Jordan	
400 m	52.72	Salwa Eid Nasser	Bahrain	6 April 2019	2019 Championships	Cairo, Egypt	
800 m	2:03.13	Genzeb Shumi	Bahrain	28 October 2011	2011 Championships	Al Ain, United Arab Emirates	
1500 m	4:10.31	Maryam Yusuf Jamal	Bahrain	14 September 2005	2005 Championships	Radès, Tunisia	
5000 m	15:48.59	Betlhem Desalegn	United Arab Emirates	23 May 2013	2003 Championships	Doha, Qatar	
10,000 m	32:16.97	Alia Saeed Mohammed	United Arab Emirates	24 April 2015	2015 Championships	Manama, Bahrain	
Half marathon	1:11:02	Eunice Jepkirui Kirwa	Bahrain	24 April 2015	2015 Championships	Manama, Bahrain	
100 m hurdles	13.44	Nezha Bidouane	Morocco	27 August 1995	1995 Championships	Cairo, Egypt	
400 m hurdles	54.98	Noura Ennadi	Morocco	24 June 2023	2023 Championships	Marrakech, Morocco	
3000 m steeplechase	9:39.61	Ruth Jebet	Bahrain	23 April 2015	2015 Championships	Manama, Bahrain	
High jump	1.84 m	Rhizlane Siba	Morocco	17 June 2021	2021 Championships	Radès, Tunisia	
Pole vault	4.15 m	Dorra Mahfoudhi	Tunisia	17 July 2017	2017 Championships	Radès, Tunisia	
Long jump	6.64 m	Ghada Shouaa	Syria	27 August 1995	1995 Championships	Cairo, Egypt	
Triple jump	14.35 m	Yamilé Aldama	Sudan	21 May 2007	2007 Championships	Amman, Jordan	
Shot put	15.90 m	Souad Malloussi	Morocco	7 August 1987	1987 Championships	Algiers, Algeria	
Discus throw	54.61 m	Monia Kari	Tunisia	14 September 2005	2005 Championships	Rades, Tunisia	
Hammer throw	65.90 m	Rawan Ayman Barakat	Egypt	7 April 2019	2019 Championships	Cairo, Egypt	
Javelin throw	56.09 m	Hana'a Ramadhan Omar	Egypt	6 October 2009	2009 Championships	Damascus, Syria	
Heptathlon	5573 pts NWI	Yasmina Omrani	Algeria	21–22 May 2013	2013 Championships	Doha, Qatar	
Heptathlon	100m H (wind) / High jump / Shot put / 200m (wind) / Long jump (wind) / Javelin / 800m; 14.09 (−1.4 m/s) / 1.66 m / 12.54 m / 25.06 (−1.2 m/s) / 5.50 m (NWI) / 40.02 m / 2:17.73						
10000m walk (track)	45:39.55	Imen Saii	Tunisia	30 April 2025	2025 Championships	Oran, Algeria	
4 × 100 m relay	46.04		Morocco	23 June 2023	2023 Championships	Marrakech, Morocco	
4 × 400 m relay	3:36.77		Bahrain	27 April 2015	2015 Championships	Manama, Bahrain	

== See also ==
- Athletics at the Pan Arab Games
- Arab Junior Athletics Championships
- International Athletics Championships and Games
