= List of Algerian Athletics Championships winners =

The Algerian Athletics Championships is an annual outdoor competition in the sport of athletics that is organised by the Algerian Athletics Federation which serves as the national championship for Algeria. It was first held in 1963, following Algeria's independence from France after the Algerian War, and featured both men's and women's events. Prior to that, Algerians had competed in the French Athletics Championships. Most of the winners have been Algerian nationals, though a small number of invited foreign athletes have won events at the competition.

== Men's track ==
=== 100 metres ===
- 1963: Ali Brakchi
- 1964: ?
- 1965: Nadim Nekrouf
- 1966: Nadim Nekrouf
- 1967: Bengarnout
- 1968: Benhabylès
- 1969: Benhabylès
- 1970: El Hadi Sayah
- 1971: Toufik Chaouch
- 1972: El Hadi Sayah
- 1973: Toufik Chaouch
- 1974: ?
- 1975: Toufik Chaouch
- 1976: Ahmed Sami Al-Sheikli (IRQ)
- 1977: Brahim Badi
- 1978: Matthias Pohle (GDR)
- 1979: Abdelkader Kaci
- 1980: Brahim Badi
- 1981: Abdeslam Kaddouri
- 1982: Mahieddine Matmati
- 1983: Ali Bakhta
- 1984: Djamel Boudebidah
- 1985: Mustapha Kamel Selmi
- 1986: Mustapha Kamel Selmi
- 1987: Mustapha Kamel Selmi
- 1988: Mustapha Kamel Selmi
- 1989: Benyoucef Aïssa Khalifa
- 1990: Benyoucef Aïssa Khalifa
- 1991: Ousmane Diarra (MLI)
- 1992: Mustapha Kamel Selmi
- 1993: Amar Hecini
- 1994: Amar Hecini
- 1995: Amar Hecini
- 1996: Yacine Djellil
- 1997: Malik Louahla
- 1998: Malik Louahla
- 1999: Yacine Djellil
- 2000: Tayeb Ayache
- 2001: Yacine Djellil
- 2002: Yacine Djellil
- 2003: Malik Louahla
- 2004: Mohamed Assaïdi
- 2005: Sofiène Kezzal
- 2006: Issam Nima

=== 200 metres ===
- 1963: Mohamed Louahla
- 1964: Nadim Nekrouf
- 1965: Nadim Nekrouf
- 1966: ?
- 1967: Saïdi
- 1968: Saïdi
- 1969: Belalermi
- 1970: El Hadi Sayah
- 1971: Meziane Brahimi
- 1972: Toufik Chaouch
- 1973: ?
- 1974: ?
- 1975: ?
- 1976: Siegmar Lathan (GDR)
- 1977: Brahim Badi
- 1978: Matthias Pohle (GDR)
- 1979: Brahim Amour
- 1980: Brahim Badi
- 1981: Brahim Amour
- 1982: Brahim Amour
- 1983: Ali Bakhta
- 1984: Ali Bakhta
- 1985: Ali Bakhta
- 1986: Ali Bakhta
- 1987: Mustapha Kamel Selmi
- 1988: Mustapha Kamel Selmi
- 1989: Mustapha Kamel Selmi
- 1990: Benyoucef Aïssa Khalifa
- 1991: Amar Hecini
- 1992: Amar Hecini
- 1993: Amar Hecini
- 1994: Amar Hecini
- 1995: Amar Hecini
- 1996: Yacine Djellil
- 1997: Amar Hecini
- 1998: Malik Louahla
- 1999: Yacine Djellil
- 2000: Yacine Djellil
- 2001: Malik Louahla
- 2002: Malik Louahla
- 2003: Malik Louahla
- 2004: Malik Louahla
- 2005: Malik Louahla
- 2006: Malik Louahla

=== 400 metres ===
- 1963: Mohamed Louahla
- 1964: Idekaideme
- 1965: Mohamed Louahla
- 1966: Mohamed Louahla
- 1967: Baghdadi Si Mohamed
- 1968: Mohamed Djouad
- 1969: Mohamed Djouad
- 1970: Mohamed Djouad
- 1971: Mohamed Djouad
- 1972: Mohamed Sid Ali Djouadi
- 1973: Mohamed Sid Ali Djouadi
- 1974: ?
- 1975: Temassini
- 1976: Jürgen Utikal (GDR)
- 1977: Mohamed Aïssaoui
- 1978: Mohamed Aïssaoui
- 1979: Mohamed Aïssaoui
- 1980: Brahim Amour
- 1981: Mohamed Aïssaoui
- 1982: Brahim Amour
- 1983: Mohamed Aïssaoui
- 1984: Mohamed Aïssaoui
- 1985: Mohamed Aïssaoui
- 1986: Mohamed Filali
- 1987: Mohamed Aïssaoui
- 1988: Mohamed Filali
- 1989: Mohamed Filali
- 1990: Amar Hecini
- 1991: Amar Hecini
- 1992: Amar Hecini
- 1993: Sadek Boumendil
- 1994: Sadek Boumendil
- 1995: Sadek Boumendil
- 1996: Samir-Adel Louahla
- 1997: Samir-Adel Louahla
- 1998: Adem Hecini
- 1999: Djamel Benaïd
- 2000: Malik Louahla
- 2001: Malik Louahla
- 2002: Adem Hecini
- 2003: Adem Hecini
- 2004: Adem Hecini
- 2005: Fayçal Chérifi
- 2006: Malik Louahla

=== 800 metres ===
- 1963: Baghdadi? Si Mohamed
- 1964: ?
- 1965: ?
- 1966: ?
- 1967: Baghdadi Si Mohamed
- 1968: Baghdadi Si Mohamed
- 1969: Azzedine Azzouzi
- 1970: Mohamed Sid Ali Djouadi
- 1971: Mohamed Sid Ali Djouadi
- 1972: Azzedine Azzouzi
- 1973: Mohamed Sid Ali Djouadi
- 1974: ?
- 1975: ?
- 1976: Amar Brahmia
- 1977: Mehdi Aidet
- 1978: Amar Brahmia
- 1979: Derradji Harek
- 1980: Mehdi Aidet
- 1981: Saïd Ouakli
- 1982: Saïd Ouakli
- 1983: Mehdi Aidet
- 1984: Ahmed Belkessam
- 1985: Ahmed Belkessam
- 1986: Ahmed Belkessam
- 1987: Bouazza Noualla
- 1988: Réda Abdenouz
- 1989: Réda Abdenouz
- 1990: Réda Abdenouz
- 1991: Ahmed Belkessam
- 1992: Bouazza Noualla
- 1993: Kada Mouhaouch
- 1994: Riad Gatt
- 1995: Farouk Amaouche
- 1996: Djabir Saïd-Guerni
- 1997: Adem Hecini
- 1998: Djabir Saïd-Guerni
- 1999: Djabir Saïd-Guerni
- 2000: Djabir Saïd-Guerni
- 2001: Adem Hecini
- 2002: Djabir Saïd-Guerni
- 2003: ?
- 2004: Nabil Mahdi
- 2005: Antar Zerguelaïne
- 2006: Nabil Mahdi

=== 1500 metres ===
- 1963: Djamel Si Mohamed
- 1964: ?
- 1965: Djamel Si Mohamed
- 1966: Baghdadi? Si Mohamed
- 1967: Abdelatif Derradji
- 1968: Abdelatif Derradji
- 1969: Boualem Rahoui
- 1970: Kamel Guemmar
- 1971: Mohamed Kacemi
- 1972: Azzedine Azzouzi
- 1973: Azzedine Azzouzi
- 1974: ?
- 1975: Mohamed Sid Ali Djouadi
- 1976: Frank Baumgartl (GDR)
- 1977: Mehdi Aidet
- 1978: Abderrahmane Morceli
- 1979: El Hachemi Abdenouz
- 1980: Mehdi Aidet
- 1981: Mehdi Aidet
- 1982: Mehdi Aidet
- 1983: Abderrahmane Morceli
- 1984: Mehdi Aidet
- 1985: Abderrahmane Morceli
- 1986: Rachid Kram
- 1987: Rachid Kram
- 1988: Abbès Tehami
- 1989: Noureddine Morceli
- 1990: Abdelbaki Brahmi
- 1991: Azzedine Brahmi
- 1992: Abdelkrim Benzaï
- 1993: Abdelhamid Slimani
- 1994: Abdelhamid Slimani
- 1995: Réda Benzine
- 1996: Miloud Abaoub
- 1997: Abdelhamid Slimani
- 1998: Abdelhamid Slimani
- 1999: Mohamed Abdelli
- 2000: Kamal Boulahfane
- 2001: Tarek Boukensa
- 2002: Tarek Boukensa
- 2003: ?
- 2004: Tarek Boukensa
- 2005: Tarek Boukensa
- 2006: Kamal Boulahfane

=== 5000 metres ===
- 1963: Hamida Addéche
- 1964: ?
- 1965: Abderrahmane Delhoum
- 1966: A. Tounsi
- 1967: Mohamed Gouasmi
- 1968: Boualem Rahoui
- 1969: Boualem Rahoui
- 1970: Mohamed Gouasmi
- 1971: Mohamed Gouasmi
- 1972: Djelloul Attalah
- 1973: Djelloul Attalah
- 1974: ?
- 1975: ?
- 1976: Wilfried Scholz (GDR)
- 1977: Rachid Habchaoui
- 1978: El Hachemi Abdenouz
- 1979: ?
- 1980: Rachid Habchaoui
- 1981: Rachid Habchaoui
- 1982: Abderrazak Bounour
- 1983: El Hachemi Abdenouz
- 1984: El Hachemi Abdenouz
- 1985: Abderrazak Bounour
- 1986: Kamel Kermiche
- 1987: Miloud Djellal
- 1988: Miloud Djellal
- 1989: Mohamed Difallah
- 1990: Mohamed Difallah
- 1991: Mohamed Belabbès
- 1992: Tayeb Lahmar
- 1993: Mohamed Belabbès
- 1994: Mohamed Belabbès
- 1995: Réda Benzine
- 1996: Tarek Zoghmar
- 1997: Tarek Zoghmar
- 1998: Réda Benzine
- 1999: Miloud Abaoub
- 2000: Samir Moussaoui
- 2001: Samir Moussaoui
- 2002: Khoudir Aggoune
- 2003: ?
- 2004: Mohamed Khaldi
- 2005: Khoudir Aggoune
- 2006: Khoudir Aggoune

=== 10,000 metres ===
- 1963: Behloul Guenaoui
- 1964: Perritune
- 1965: Mohamed Iridir
- 1966: Bensahraoui
- 1967: Abderrahmane Delhoum
- 1968: Behloul Guenaoui
- 1969: Tahar Bounab
- 1970: Abderrahmane Delhoum
- 1971: Mohamed Gouasmi
- 1972: Mohamed Gouasmi
- 1973: Chérif Benali
- 1974: ?
- 1975: ?
- 1976: Possibly not held
- 1977: ?
- 1978: Rachid Habchaoui
- 1979: ?
- 1980: Rachid Habchaoui
- 1981: ?
- 1982: Rachid Habchaoui
- 1983: ?
- 1984: Abderrazak Bounour
- 1985: Mohamed Kamel Selmi
- 1986: Sid Ali Sakhri
- 1987: Abdelhak Hénane
- 1988: Miloud Djellal
- 1989: Mohamed Difallah
- 1990: ?
- 1991: Miloud Djellal
- 1992: Mohamed Belabbès
- 1993: Mahieddine Belhadj
- 1994: Azzedine Sakhri
- 1995: Miloud Djellal
- 1996: Miloud Djellal
- 1997: Ahmed Boulahia
- 1998: ?
- 1999: Mustapha Benacer
- 2000: Ahmed Boulahia
- 2001: Abdelkrim Benzaï
- 2002: Kamel Kohil
- 2003: ?
- 2004: Kamel Kohil
- 2005: ?
- 2006: ?

=== One-hour run ===
- 1994: Kamel Kohil
- 1995: ?
- 1996: Tayeb Bachir Chérif
- 1997: Amor Dehbi
- 1998: Ahmed Boulahia
- 1999: Abdelghani Boudoukha
- 2000: ?
- 2001: Abdelkrim Benzaï

=== 20,000 metres ===
- 1994: Kamel Kohil
- 1995: ?
- 1996: Tayeb Bachir Chérif
- 1997: Amor Dehbi
- 1998: Ahmed Boulahia
- 1999: Abdelghani Boudoukha
- 2000: ?
- 2001: Abdelkrim Benzaï

=== 3000 metres steeplechase ===
- 1963: Hamoud Ameur
- 1964: ?
- 1965: Possibly not held
- 1966: ?
- 1967: Ferchichi
- 1968: Ferchichi
- 1969: Yahia Mezdoud
- 1970: Boualem Rahoui
- 1971: Boualem Rahoui
- 1972: Mohamed Salem
- 1973: Mohamed Salem
- 1974: ?
- 1975: Boualem Rahoui
- 1976: Smain Yahiaoui
- 1977: ?
- 1978: Mohamed Salem
- 1979: Lahcen Babaci
- 1980: Lahcen Babaci
- 1981: Lahcen Babaci
- 1982: Boualem Rahoui
- 1983: Rabah Aboura
- 1984: Lahcen Babaci
- 1985: Habib Chérif
- 1986: Azzedine Brahmi
- 1987: Habib Chérif
- 1988: Azzedine Brahmi
- 1989: Azzedine Brahmi
- 1990: Habib Chérif
- 1991: Ferhat Zaïdi
- 1992: Tayeb Lahmar
- 1993: Mourad Bouldjadj
- 1994: Mohamed Belabbès
- 1995: Mohamed Belabbès
- 1996: Abderrahmane Daas
- 1997: Abderrahmane Daas
- 1998: Laïd Bessou
- 1999: Mourad Benslimani
- 2000: Mourad Benslimani
- 2001: Mourad Benslimani
- 2002: Hussain Ali Al-Asmari (KSA)
- 2003: ?
- 2004: Mohamed Abdelli
- 2005: Merzak Ould Bouchiba
- 2006: Med Amine Bensalem

=== 110 metres hurdles ===
- 1963: Chidekh
- 1964: ?
- 1965: Dali
- 1966: Benrokia
- 1967: Abdelkader Boudjemaa
- 1968: Abdelkader Boudjemaa
- 1969: Abdelkader Boudjemaa
- 1970: Abdelkader Boudjemaa
- 1971: Abdelkader Boudjemaa
- 1972: Abdelkader Boudjemaa
- 1973: Knut Eike (GDR)
- 1974: ?
- 1975: Abdelkader Boudjemaa
- 1976: Jochen Mayer (GDR)
- 1977: Mohamed Bensaad
- 1978: Riad Benhaddad
- 1979: Riad Benhaddad
- 1980: Mohamed Bensaad
- 1981: Riad Benhaddad
- 1982: Mohamed Bensaad
- 1983: Riad Benhaddad
- 1984: Riad Benhaddad
- 1985: Riad Benhaddad
- 1986: Noureddine Tadjine
- 1987: Noureddine Tadjine
- 1988: Noureddine Tadjine
- 1989: Noureddine Tadjine
- 1990: Noureddine Tadjine
- 1991: Noureddine Tadjine
- 1992: Karim Karrar
- 1993: Noureddine Tadjine
- 1994: Noureddine Tadjine
- 1995: Noureddine Tadjine
- 1996: Djelloul Aïbout
- 1997: Djelloul Aïbout
- 1998: Rédouane Youcef
- 1999: Rédouane Youcef
- 2000: Samir Bouabcha
- 2001: Abderrahim Dali Bey
- 2002: Abderrahim Dali Bey
- 2003: ?
- 2004: Athmane Hadj Lazib
- 2005: Mourad Souissi
- 2006: Athmane Hadj Lazib

=== 400 metres hurdles ===
- 1963: Abderrahmane Delhoum
- 1964: ?
- 1965: Benyoucef
- 1966: ?
- 1967: Mohamed Louahla
- 1968: Azzedine Azzouzi
- 1969: ?
- 1970: Mohamed Djouad
- 1971: Abdelkader Boudjemaa
- 1972: Abdelkader Boudjemaa
- 1973: Mohamed Djouad
- 1974: ?
- 1975: ?
- 1976: Jochen Mayer (GDR)
- 1977: Lahcene Belhadjoudja
- 1978: Fayçal Boutella
- 1979: Lahcene Belhadjoudja
- 1980: Lahcene Belhadjoudja
- 1981: Lahcene Belhadjoudja
- 1982: Khalifa Khémiri (TUN)
- 1983: Laouari Benmaghnia
- 1984: Ali Berrabah
- 1985: Kamel Zémouri
- 1986: Lyes Bernaoui
- 1987: Lyes Bernaoui
- 1988: Lyes Bernaoui
- 1989: Adel Jemmali (TUN)
- 1990: Lyes Bouakline
- 1991: Amine Hacini
- 1992: Amine Hacini
- 1993: Fadhel Khayati (TUN)
- 1994: Amine Harchouche
- 1995: Ouahid Ketit
- 1996: Nabil Selmi
- 1997: Ouahid Ketit
- 1998: Ouahid Ketit
- 1999: Ouahid Ketit
- 2000: Tahar Ghozali
- 2001: Nabil Selmi
- 2002: Nabil Selmi
- 2003: Abdelhamid Amara
- 2004: Nabil Selmi
- 2005: Abdelhamid Amara
- 2006: Abderrahmane Hammadi

== Men's field ==
=== High jump ===
- 1963: Ali Brakchi
- 1964: ?
- 1965: Djerbal
- 1966: ?
- 1967: Djerbal
- 1968: Ould Aoudia
- 1969: Djerbal
- 1970: Possibly not held
- 1971: Tarek Kadri
- 1972: Amara Korba
- 1973: Detlef Eckert (GDR)
- 1974: ?
- 1975: Hamid Sahil
- 1976: Christian Dressler (GDR)
- 1977: Hamid Sahil
- 1978: Hamid Sahil
- 1979: Hamid Sahil
- 1980: Hamid Sahil
- 1981: Abdenour Krim
- 1982: Abdenour Krim
- 1983: Abdenour Krim
- 1984: Azzedine Mostéfa
- 1985: Azzedine Mostéfa
- 1986: Abdenour Krim
- 1987: Nabil Berbiche
- 1988: Othmane Belfaa
- 1989: Othmane Belfaa
- 1990: Othmane Belfaa
- 1991: Othmane Belfaa
- 1992: Othmane Belfaa
- 1993: Othmane Belfaa
- 1994: Othmane Belfaa
- 1995: Yacine Mousli
- 1996: Yacine Mousli
- 1997: Abderrahmane Hammad
- 1998: Abderrahmane Hammad
- 1999: Abderrahmane Hammad
- 2000: Abderrahmane Hammad
- 2001: Abderrahmane Hammad
- 2002: Abderrahmane Hammad
- 2003: Abderrahmane Hammad
- 2004: Abderrahmane Hammad
- 2005: Abderrahmane Hammad
- 2006: Mohamed Benhadia

=== Pole vault ===
- 1966: Belhamiti
- 1967: Possibly not held
- 1968: Possibly not held
- 1969: ?
- 1970: Haddadi
- 1971: Djamel Bouzerar
- 1972: Djamel Bouzerar
- 1973: Ahmed Rezki
- 1974: ?
- 1975: Lakhdar Rahal
- 1976: Axel Weber (GDR)
- 1977: ?
- 1978: Ahmed Rezki
- 1979: Ahmed Rezki
- 1980: ?
- 1981: Mohamed Bensaad
- 1982: Mourad Mahour Bacha
- 1983: Mohamed Bensaad
- 1984: Mourad Mahour Bacha
- 1985: Mourad Mahour Bacha
- 1986: Samir Agsous
- 1987: Samir Agsous
- 1988: Samir Agsous
- 1989: Sami Si Mohamed
- 1990: Samir Agsous
- 1991: Sid Ali Sabour
- 1992: Samir Agsous
- 1993: Belgacem Touami
- 1994: Rafik Mefti
- 1995: Rafik Mefti
- 1996: Rafik Mefti
- 1997: Abderrazak Yahiaoui
- 1998: Rafik Mefti
- 1999: Rafik Mefti
- 2000: Rafik Mefti
- 2001: Rafik Mefti
- 2002: Rafik Mefti
- 2003: ?
- 2004: Rafik Mefti
- 2005: Amine Hafed
- 2006: Mouloud Ziani

=== Long jump ===
- 1963: Ali Brakchi
- 1964: ?
- 1965: Douar
- 1966: Douar
- 1967: Youcef Boulfelfel
- 1968: Maazouz
- 1969: Youcef Boulfelfel
- 1970: Bouziane
- 1971: Hocine Boudiffa
- 1972: Hocine Boudiffa
- 1973: ?
- 1974: ?
- 1975: ?
- 1976: ?
- 1977: Ahmed Rezki
- 1978: Bernd Heiland (GDR)
- 1979: Saïd Saad
- 1980: Othmane Belfaa
- 1981: Ahmed Benazoug
- 1982: ?
- 1983: Bachir Messikh
- 1984: Ahmed Benazoug
- 1985: Djamel Mébarki
- 1986: Nacer Saadoune
- 1987: Ahmed Benazoug
- 1988: Lotfi Khaïda
- 1989: Lotfi Khaïda
- 1990: Nadir Si Mohamed
- 1991: Lotfi Khaïda
- 1992: Féthi Amira
- 1993: Abderrahmane Hadjou
- 1994: Lotfi Khaïda
- 1995: Nabil Adamou
- 1996: Farid Hassa
- 1997: Féthi Amira
- 1998: Rédouane Youcef
- 1999: Issam Nima
- 2000: Rédouane Youcef
- 2001: Rédouane Youcef
- 2002: Nabil Adamou
- 2003: ?
- 2004: Issam Nima
- 2005: Issam Nima
- 2006: Issam Nima

=== Triple jump ===
- 1963: Ali Brakchi
- 1964: ?
- 1965: Youcef Boulfelfel
- 1966: Ould Ahmed
- 1967: Possibly not held
- 1968: Maazouz
- 1969: Youcef Boulfelfel
- 1970: Youcef Boulfelfel
- 1971: Lakhdar Merouane
- 1972: Lakhdar Merouane
- 1973: ?
- 1974: ?
- 1975: ?
- 1976: Abubakar Ramdane (LBA)
- 1977: Saïd Saad
- 1978: Saïd Saad
- 1979: Saïd Saad
- 1980: Saïd Saad
- 1981: Saïd Saad
- 1982: Saïd Saad
- 1983: Saïd Saad
- 1984: Saïd Saad
- 1985: Azzedine Talhi
- 1986: Abdelhamid Sekkaï
- 1987: Lotfi Khaïda
- 1988: Lotfi Khaïda
- 1989: Lotfi Khaïda
- 1990: Soulimane Ouabel
- 1991: Lotfi Khaïda
- 1992: Soulimane Ouabel
- 1993: Lotfi Khaïda
- 1994: Lotfi Khaïda
- 1995: Lotfi Khaïda
- 1996: Areslane Belkheïr
- 1997: Féthi Amira
- 1998: Féthi Amira
- 1999: Areslane Belkheïr
- 2000: Areslane Belkheïr
- 2001: Areslane Belkheïr
- 2002: Hamza Ménina
- 2003: ?
- 2004: Hamza Ménina
- 2005: Hamza Ménina
- 2006: Hocine Benchikh

=== Shot put ===
- 1963: Ali Brakchi
- 1964: ?
- 1965: Noureddine Bendifallah
- 1966: Noureddine Bendifallah
- 1967: Noureddine Bendifallah
- 1968: Ahmed Bendifallah
- 1969: Ahmed Bendifallah
- 1970: Ahmed Bendifallah
- 1971: Jean-Marie Djebaili
- 1972: Jean-Marie Djebaili
- 1973: Jean-Marie Djebaili
- 1974: ?
- 1975: ?
- 1976: ?
- 1977: ?
- 1978: Zhelyazko Zhelyazkov (BUL)
- 1979: Fillali Hadj Brahim
- 1980: ?
- 1981: Georgi Georgiev (BUL)
- 1982: Nikola Khristov (BUL)
- 1983: Mourad Mahour Bacha
- 1984: Mourad Mahour Bacha
- 1985: Mourad Mahour Bacha
- 1986: Mourad Mahour Bacha
- 1987: Tahar Chachoua
- 1988: Mahrez Talaboulma
- 1989: Mahrez Talaboulma
- 1990: Mahrez Talaboulma
- 1991: Wahid Bakhli
- 1992: Tahar Chachoua
- 1993: Tahar Chachoua
- 1994: Tahar Chachoua
- 1995: Tahar Chachoua
- 1996: Tahar Chachoua
- 1997: Khalil Slimani
- 1998: Khalil Slimani
- 1999: Khalil Slimani
- 2000: Khalil Slimani
- 2001: Khalil Slimani
- 2002: Khalil Slimani
- 2003: ?
- 2004: Abdelkader Belalia
- 2005: Nassim Kaci
- 2006: Malek Yefsah

=== Discus throw ===
- 1963: Maachou
- 1964: ?
- 1965: Ahmed Bendifallah
- 1966: ?
- 1967: Ahmed Bendifallah
- 1968: Ahmed Bendifallah
- 1969: ?
- 1970: Ahmed Bendifallah
- 1971: ?
- 1972: Jean-Marie Djebaili
- 1973: Norbert Thiede (GDR)
- 1974: ?
- 1975: ?
- 1976: Wolfgang Schmidt (GDR)
- 1977: ?
- 1978: Fillali Hadj Brahim
- 1979: Abdellah Boubekeur
- 1980: ?
- 1981: Georgi Georgiev (BUL)
- 1982: Georgi Georgiev (BUL)
- 1983: Yacine Louail
- 1984: Yacine Louail
- 1985: Mourad Mahour Bacha
- 1986: Yacine Louail
- 1987: Yacine Louail
- 1988: Yacine Louail
- 1989: Yacine Louail
- 1990: Yacine Louail
- 1991: Mourad Mahour Bacha
- 1992: Mourad Mahour Bacha
- 1993: Mourad Mahour Bacha
- 1994: Yacine Louail
- 1995: Abderrazak Yahiaoui
- 1996: Hakim Yahiaoui
- 1997: Walid Boudaoui
- 1998: Abderrazak Yahiaoui
- 1999: Walid Boudaoui
- 2000: Walid Boudaoui
- 2001: Walid Boudaoui
- 2002: Walid Boudaoui
- 2003: ?
- 2004: Walid Boudaoui
- 2005: Walid Boudaoui
- 2006: Hakim Yahiaoui

=== Hammer throw ===
- 1970: Noureddine Bendifallah
- 1971: Possibly not held
- 1972: Possibly not held
- 1973: Noureddine Bendifallah
- 1974: ?
- 1975: ?
- 1976: Karl-Heinz Beilig (GDR)
- 1977: ?
- 1978: Abdellah Boubekeur
- 1979: Abdellah Boubekeur
- 1980: Abdellah Boubekeur
- 1981: ?
- 1982: Hakim Toumi
- 1983: Hakim Toumi
- 1984: Hakim Toumi
- 1985: Hakim Toumi
- 1986: Hakim Toumi
- 1987: Hakim Toumi
- 1988: Hakim Toumi
- 1989: Hakim Toumi
- 1990: Hakim Toumi
- 1991: Samir Haouam
- 1992: Hakim Toumi
- 1993: Hakim Toumi
- 1994: Hakim Toumi
- 1995: Hakim Toumi
- 1996: Hakim Toumi
- 1997: Hakim Toumi
- 1998: Hakim Toumi
- 1999: Samir Haouam
- 2000: Samir Haouam
- 2001: Samir Haouam
- 2002: Samir Haouam
- 2003: Hakim Toumi
- 2004: Samir Haouam
- 2005: Samir Haouam
- 2006: Samir Haouam

=== Javelin throw ===
- 1963: Djerbal
- 1964: ?
- 1965: Possibly not held
- 1966: Nadjari
- 1967: Nadjari
- 1968: Maamar Boubekeur
- 1969: Djerbal
- 1970: Maamar Boubekeur
- 1971: Maamar Boubekeur
- 1972: Takorabet
- 1973: Manfred Ahlert (GDR)
- 1974: ?
- 1975: ?
- 1976: Jacek Damszel (POL)
- 1977: Maamar Boubekeur
- 1978: Maamar Boubekeur
- 1979: Salim Benniou
- 1980: Jozef Hanušovský (TCH)
- 1981: ?
- 1982: Allel Boulmahli
- 1983: Mourad Mahour Bacha
- 1984: Mourad Mahour Bacha
- 1985: Mourad Mahour Bacha
- 1986: Mourad Mahour Bacha
- 1987: Mourad Mahour Bacha
- 1988: Mourad Mahour Bacha
- 1989: Mourad Mahour Bacha
- 1990: Samir Ménouar
- 1991: Samir Ménouar
- 1992: Mourad Mahour Bacha
- 1993: Mourad Mahour Bacha
- 1994: Riad Guellati
- 1995: Kheïr Regam
- 1996: Kheïr Regam
- 1997: Youcef Bensaha
- 1998: Youcef Bensaha
- 1999: Youcef Bensaha
- 2000: Youcef Bensaha
- 2001: Youcef Bensaha
- 2002: Youcef Bensaha
- 2003: ?
- 2004: Nassim Mokrani
- 2005: ?
- 2006: Nassim Mokrani

=== Decathlon ===
- 1972: Mohamed Bensaad
- 1973: ?
- 1974: ?
- 1975: ?
- 1976: ?
- 1977: ?
- 1978: ?
- 1979: ?
- 1980: ?
- 1981: ?
- 1982: Mourad Mahour Bacha
- 1983: ?
- 1984: Mourad Mahour Bacha
- 1985: Mahmoud Aït Ouhamou
- 1986: Mahmoud Aït Ouhamou
- 1987: ?
- 1988: ?
- 1989: Mahmoud Aït Ouhamou
- 1990: ?
- 1991: Sid Ali Sabour
- 1992: Mourad Mahour Bacha
- 1993: ?
- 1994: ?
- 1995: Sid Ali Sabour
- 1996: Sid Ali Sabour
- 1997: Rédouane Youcef
- 1998: Rédouane Youcef
- 1999: Rédouane Youcef
- 2000: Mohamed Benyahia
- 2001: ?
- 2002: Rédouane Youcef
- 2003: ?
- 2004: ?
- 2005: Rédouane Youcef
- 2006: ?

== Men's road ==
=== Half marathon ===
- 1987: Arezki Hamadache
- 1988: Not held
- 1989: Not held
- 1990: Not held
- 1991: Not held
- 1992: Not held
- 1993: Azzedine Sakhri
- 1994: Mahieddine Belhadj
- 1995: Azzedine Sakhri
- 1996: Kamel Kohil
- 1997: Ahmed Bouyelli
- 1998: Rachid Boulanouar
- 1999: Amor Dehbi
- 2000: Noureddine Betrim
- 2001: Saïd Belhout
- 2002: Abbas Kannouta
- 2003: ?
- 2004: ?
- 2005: Azzedine Zerdoum
- 2006: ?

=== Marathon ===
- 1977: Lazreg Lakhal
- 1978: ?
- 1979: ?
- 1980: ?
- 1981: ?
- 1982: ?
- 1983: ?
- 1984: Mohamed Abaidia
- 1985: Arezki Hamadache
- 1986: ?
- 1987: Possibly not held
- 1988: Farid Belmahdi
- 1989: Ali Hadj Boudi
- 1990: ?
- 1991: Allaoua Khellil
- 1992: Fateh Haddad
- 1993: Slimane Touati
- 1994: ?
- 1995: Allaoua Khellil
- 1996: Allaoua Khellil
- 1997: Rédouane Héchaïchi
- 1998: Allaoua Khellil
- 1999: ?
- 2000: Rabah Azzouz
- 2001: ?
- 2002: ?
- 2003: ?
- 2004: ?
- 2005: Azzedine Sakhri
- 2006: ?

=== 10,000 metres walk ===
- 1972: Mohamed Meskari
- 1973: Possibly not held
- 1974: ?
- 1975: ?
- 1976: ?
- 1977: ?
- 1978: ?
- 1979: ?
- 1980: ?
- 1981: Benamar Kachkouche
- 1982: Benamar Kachkouche
- 1983: ?
- 1984: Not held
- 1985: Not held
- 1986: Not held
- 1987: Not held
- 1988: Not held
- 1989: Not held
- 1990: Not held
- 1991: Moussa Aouanouk
- 1992: Abdelwahab Ferguène
- 1993: Abdelwahab Ferguène
- 1994: Younès Aouanouk
- 1995: Moussa Aouanouk
- 1996: Lounès Méhadi
- 1997: Moussa Aouanouk
- 1998: ?
- 1999: Moussa Aouanouk
- 2000: Moussa Aouanouk
- 2001: Arezki Yahiaoui
- 2002: Moussa Aouanouk
- 2003: ?
- 2004: ?
- 2005: ?
- 2006: ?

=== 20 kilometres walk ===
The championships in 1978, 1984, 1985 and 1986 were held on a track. The course for the 1988 championship was short.

- 1969: Mohamed Meskari
- 1970: Possibly not held
- 1971: Possibly not held
- 1972: Possibly not held
- 1973: Possibly not held
- 1974: ?
- 1975: ?
- 1976: ?
- 1977: ?
- 1978: Benamar Kachkouche
- 1979: ?
- 1980: ?
- 1981: Possibly not held
- 1982: Possibly not held
- 1983: ?
- 1984: Hamid Mécifi
- 1985: Abdelwahab Ferguène
- 1986: Arezki Boumrar
- 1987: ?
- 1988: Abdelwahab Ferguène
- 1989: Abdelwahab Ferguène
- 1990: Abdelwahab Ferguène
- 1991: ?
- 1992: Abderrahmane Djebbar
- 1993: ?
- 1994: ?
- 1995: Lounès Méhadi
- 1996: Lounès Méhadi
- 1997: Lounès Méhadi
- 1998: Moussa Aouanouk
- 1999: Moussa Aouanouk
- 2000: Moussa Aouanouk
- 2001: ?
- 2002: ?
- 2003: ?
- 2004: Mohamed Ameur
- 2005: Moussa Aouanouk
- 2006: Hichem Medjeber

=== 50 kilometres walk ===
- 1987: H'mimed Rahouli

=== Cross country (long course) ===
- 1963: Abderrahmane Delhoum
- 1964: Bensahraoui
- 1965: Hamida Addéche
- 1966: Abdelkader Benyettou
- 1967: Aïssa Benfarès
- 1968: Aïssa Benfarès
- 1969: Ferchichi
- 1970: Mohamed Gouasmi
- 1971: Mohamed Kacemi
- 1972: Mohamed Gouasmi
- 1973: Chérif Benali
- 1974: Mohamed Kacemi
- 1975: Djelloul Rezig
- 1976: Boualem Rahoui
- 1977: Mahmoud Hazzazi
- 1978: Boualem Rahoui
- 1979: Lahcen Babaci
- 1980: Rachid Habchaoui
- 1981: El Hachemi Abdenouz
- 1982: El Hachemi Abdenouz
- 1983: Boualem Rahoui
- 1984: Rachid Habchaoui
- 1985: Abderrazak Bounour
- 1986: Lasmani Merzougui
- 1987: Mahieddine Belhadj
- 1988: Abbès Tehami
- 1989: Abbès Tehami
- 1990: Mohamed Difallah
- 1991: Mahieddine Belhadj
- 1992: Mourad Bouldjadj
- 1993: Yahia Azaïdj
- 1994: Yahia Azaïdj
- 1995: Azzedine Sakhri
- 1996: ?
- 1997: Kamel Kohil
- 1998: Azzedine Sakhri
- 1999: Kamel Kohil
- 2000: Miloud Abaoub
- 2001: Kamel Kohil
- 2002: ?
- 2003: Kamel Kohil
- 2004: Ahmed Naïli
- 2005: Khoudir Aggoune
- 2006: Ahmed Naïli

=== Cross country (short course) ===
- 1976: Tizraoui
- 1977: Mehdi Aidet
- 1978: Abderrahmane Morceli
- 1979: Derradji Harek
- 1980: Mehdi Aidet
- 1981: Derradji Harek
- 1982: Possibly not held
- 1983: Possibly not held
- 1984: Mourad Mouats
- 1985: Possibly not held
- 1986: Possibly not held
- 1987: Possibly not held
- 1988: Possibly not held
- 1989: Possibly not held
- 1990: Possibly not held
- 1991: Possibly not held
- 1992: Possibly not held
- 1993: Possibly not held
- 1994: Possibly not held
- 1995: Possibly not held
- 1996: Possibly not held
- 1997: Possibly not held
- 1998: Abdelrahmane Djemadi
- 1999: Laïd Bessou
- 2000: Laïd Bessou
- 2001: Kamal Boulahfane
- 2002: ?
- 2003: Khoudir Aggoune
- 2004: Samir Moussaoui
- 2005: Khoudir Aggoune
- 2006: Khoudir Aggoune

== Women's track ==
=== 100 metres ===
- 1963: Mouelfi
- 1964: Mouelfi
- 1965: Mouelfi
- 1966: ?
- 1967: Rabea Ghezlane
- 1968: Zadek
- 1969: ?
- 1970: Larbi
- 1971: Larbi
- 1972: Istitene
- 1973: Fouzia Ramla
- 1974: ?
- 1975: Fouzia Ramla
- 1976: Kebaili
- 1977: Kebaili
- 1978: Nouria Redaouia
- 1979: Fatima Mefti
- 1980: ?
- 1981: Fatima Mefti
- 1982: Souad Chouider
- 1983: Rachida Ferdjaoui
- 1984: Souad Chouider
- 1985: Rachida Ferdjaoui
- 1986: Yasmina Azzizi-Kettab
- 1987: Mahdjouba Bouhdiba
- 1988: Rachida Ferdjaoui
- 1989: Yasmina Azzizi-Kettab
- 1990: Nadia Abdou
- 1991: Nadia Abdou
- 1992: Nouria Mérah
- 1993: Saliha Hammadi
- 1994: Saliha Hammadi
- 1995: Saliha Hammadi
- 1996: Ahlem Allali
- 1997: Baya Rahouli
- 1998: Baya Rahouli
- 1999: Baya Rahouli
- 2000: Houria Moussa
- 2001: Houria Moussa
- 2002: Houria Moussa
- 2003: ?
- 2004: Malika Ali Bacha
- 2005: Houria Moussa
- 2006: Houria Moussa

=== 200 metres ===
- 1963: Mouelfi
- 1964: ?
- 1965: Mouelfi
- 1966: Mouelfi
- 1967: Rabea Ghezlane
- 1968: Zadek
- 1969: ?
- 1970: Zerouti
- 1971: Larbi
- 1972: Khalfaoui
- 1973: Fouzia Ramla
- 1974: ?
- 1975: ?
- 1976: Fouzia Ramla
- 1977: Fouzia Ramla
- 1978: Nouria Redaouia
- 1979: Fatima Mefti
- 1980: ?
- 1981: Fatima Mefti
- 1982: Souad Chouider
- 1983: Rachida Ferdjaoui
- 1984: Souad Chouider
- 1985: Rachida Ferdjaoui
- 1986: Mahdjouba Bouhdiba
- 1987: Mahdjouba Bouhdiba
- 1988: Rachida Ferdjaoui
- 1989: Yasmina Azzizi-Kettab
- 1990: Nadia Abdou
- 1991: Nadia Abdou
- 1992: Nouria Mérah
- 1993: Mokhtaria Safi
- 1994: Nouria Mérah
- 1995: Saliha Hammadi
- 1996: Nahida Touhami
- 1997: Saliha Hammadi
- 1998: Mokhtaria Bensayah
- 1999: Hamida Benhocine
- 2000: Houria Moussa
- 2001: Sarah Arrous
- 2002: Houria Moussa
- 2003: ?
- 2004: Houria Moussa
- 2005: Nadia Rémaoune
- 2006: Houria Moussa

=== 400 metres ===
- 1963: Khorsi
- 1964: ?
- 1965: Possibly not held
- 1966: Hariba
- 1967: Ramdani
- 1968: Possibly not held
- 1969: Zadek
- 1970: Goucem Cherfi
- 1971: Goucem Cherfi
- 1972: Goucem Cherfi
- 1973: Goucem Cherfi
- 1974: ?
- 1975: Messaouda Ouchérif
- 1976: Leïla Idir
- 1977: Sakina Boutamine
- 1978: Ana Luisa Guibert (CUB)
- 1979: Sakina Boutamine
- 1980: Dalila Baouche
- 1981: Dalila Baouche
- 1982: Dalila Harek
- 1983: Dalila Harek
- 1984: Amal Boudjelti
- 1985: Rachida Ferdjaoui
- 1986: Hassiba Hallilou
- 1987: Bahria Khenniche
- 1988: Dalila Harek
- 1989: Hend Kabaoui (TUN)
- 1990: Amal Boudjelti
- 1991: Nouria Mérah
- 1992: Nouria Mérah
- 1993: Hassiba Hallilou
- 1994: Nouria Mérah
- 1995: Nouria Mérah
- 1996: Lynda Kabous
- 1997: Lynda Kabous
- 1998: Nahida Touhami
- 1999: Amal Baraket
- 2000: Nahida Touhami
- 2001: Sarah Arrous
- 2002: Sarah Arrous
- 2003: Nahida Touhami
- 2004: Sarah Arrous
- 2005: Amel Zighem
- 2006: Amel Zighem

=== 800 metres ===
- 1963: Khorsi
- 1964: ?
- 1965: Chaouch
- 1966: ?
- 1967: Mériem
- 1968: Fatima Ariane
- 1969: ?
- 1970: Goucem? Cherfi
- 1971: Goucem Cherfi
- 1972: O. Cherfi
- 1973: ?
- 1974: ?
- 1975: ?
- 1976: ?
- 1977: Sakina Boutamine
- 1978: Leïla Boudina
- 1979: Sakina Boutamine
- 1980: Sakina Boutamine
- 1981: Dalila Baouche
- 1982: Dalila Harek
- 1983: Dalila Méhira
- 1984: Mébarka Hadj Abdellah
- 1985: Mébarka Hadj Abdellah
- 1986: Salima Djelloul
- 1987: Hassiba Boulmerka
- 1988: Hassiba Boulmerka
- 1989: Hassiba Boulmerka
- 1990: Zahia Kaoud
- 1991: Zahia Kaoud
- 1992: Zahia Kaoud
- 1993: Anissa Khali
- 1994: Anissa Khali
- 1995: Nouria Mérah
- 1996: Saliha Kacemi
- 1997: Saliha Kacemi
- 1998: Wahiba Attout
- 1999: Salima Lardjam
- 2000: Nouria Mérah-Benida
- 2001: Nouria Mérah-Benida
- 2002: Nahida Touhami
- 2003: Nouria Mérah-Benida
- 2004: Widad Mendil
- 2005: Chahrazed Cheboub
- 2006: Nouria Mérah-Benida

=== 1500 metres ===
- 1969: ?
- 1970: Nabil
- 1971: O. Cherfi
- 1972: Fadila? Sabri
- 1973: Fatma Youcef
- 1974: ?
- 1975: Fatma Youcef
- 1976: Salima Méhenni
- 1977: Fatma Youcef
- 1978: Sakina Boutamine
- 1979: ?
- 1980: Sakina Boutamine
- 1981: Dalila Méhira
- 1982: Dalila Méhira
- 1983: Dalila Méhira
- 1984: Leïla Bendahmane
- 1985: Mébarka Hadj Abdellah
- 1986: Mébarka Hadj Abdellah
- 1987: Hassiba Boulmerka
- 1988: Hassiba Boulmerka
- 1989: Hassiba Boulmerka
- 1990: Hassiba Boulmerka
- 1991: Mébarka Hadj Abdellah
- 1992: Saliha Kacemi
- 1993: Leïla Bendahmane
- 1994: Anissa Khali
- 1995: Saliha Kacemi
- 1996: Nasria Baghdad-Azaïdj
- 1997: Kheïra Arfa
- 1998: Kheïra Arfa
- 1999: Nahida Touhami
- 2000: Khadija Touati
- 2001: Khadija Touati
- 2002: Khadija Touati
- 2003: ?
- 2004: Widad Mendil
- 2005: Fatiha Bahi Azzouhoum
- 2006: Nahida Touhami

=== 3000 metres ===
- 1979: ?
- 1980: ?
- 1981: ?
- 1982: Dalila Méhira
- 1983: ?
- 1984: Leïla Bendahmane
- 1985: Malika Bellounis
- 1986: Mébarka Hadj Abdellah
- 1987: Malika Benhabylès
- 1988: Mébarka Hadj Abdellah
- 1989: Mébarka Hadj Abdellah
- 1990: Mébarka Hadj Abdellah
- 1991: Mébarka Hadj Abdellah
- 1992: Rahmouna Tahrour
- 1993: Leïla Bendahmane

=== 5000 metres ===
- 1991: Zahra Djami Khédim
- 1992: Possibly not held
- 1993: Possibly not held
- 1994: Nasria Baghdad-Azaïdj
- 1995: Leïla Bendahmane
- 1996: Nasria Baghdad-Azaïdj
- 1997: Souad Aït Salem
- 1998: Souad Aït Salem
- 1999: Fouzia Zoutat
- 2000: Nasria Baghdad-Azaïdj
- 2001: Nasria Baghdad-Azaïdj
- 2002: Souad Aït Salem
- 2003: ?
- 2004: Souad Aït Salem
- 2005: Souad Aït Salem
- 2006: Souad Aït Salem

=== 10,000 metres ===
- 1988: Malika Benhabylès
- 1989: Dalila Méhira
- 1990: ?
- 1991: Possibly not held
- 1992: Amina Chaabane
- 1993: ?
- 1994: Nasria Baghdad-Azaïdj
- 1995: ?
- 1996: Leïla Bendahmane
- 1997: ?
- 1998: Dalila Tahi
- 1999: Nasria Baghdad-Azaïdj
- 2000: ?
- 2001: Fouzia Zoutat
- 2002: Souad Aït Salem
- 2003: ?
- 2004: Nasria Baghdad-Azaïdj
- 2005: ?
- 2006: ?

=== 3000 metres steeplechase ===
- 2003: ?
- 2004: Nacèra Mescari
- 2005: Khadija Touati
- 2006: Fatiha Bahi Azzouhoum

=== 80 metres hurdles ===
- 1963: Possibly not held
- 1964: ?
- 1965: Bouzerar
- 1966: ?
- 1967: Possibly not held
- 1968: Rabea Ghezlane

=== 100 metres hurdles ===
- 1969: ?
- 1970: Kerdjou
- 1971: Saihi
- 1972: Toumi
- 1973: Karima Henni
- 1974: ?
- 1975: Karima Henni
- 1976: ?
- 1977: Samia Asselah
- 1978: Zineb Addouz
- 1979: Yamina Bourzama
- 1980: ?
- 1981: Dalila Tayebi
- 1982: Nacèra Achir
- 1983: Karima Henni
- 1984: Nacèra Achir
- 1985: Nacèra Achir
- 1986: Yasmina Azzizi-Kettab
- 1987: Nacèra Zaaboub
- 1988: Fazia Gaouaoui
- 1989: Yasmina Azzizi-Kettab
- 1990: Nacèra Zaaboub
- 1991: Nacèra Zaaboub
- 1992: Nora Hassani
- 1993: Nouria Mérah
- 1994: Yasmina Azzizi-Kettab
- 1995: Nacèra Zaaboub
- 1996: Ahlem Allali
- 1997: Baya Rahouli
- 1998: Naïma Bentahar
- 1999: Baya Rahouli
- 2000: Naïma Bentahar
- 2001: Yasmina Azzizi-Kettab
- 2002: Naïma Bentahar
- 2003: ?
- 2004: Naïma Bentahar
- 2005: Sarah Bouaoudia
- 2006: Samira Harouche

=== 400 metres hurdles ===
- 1979: ?
- 1980: Yamina Bourzama
- 1981: Nacèra Chétaibi
- 1982: Basma Gharbi (TUN)
- 1983: Nacèra Chétaibi
- 1984: Possibly not held
- 1985: Nacèra Achir
- 1986: Rachida Ferdjaoui
- 1987: Nacèra Chétaibi
- 1988: Nacèra Chétaibi
- 1989: Hend Kabaoui (TUN)
- 1990: Fatima Zahra Djellal
- 1991: Amal Baraket
- 1992: Amal Baraket
- 1993: Amal Baraket
- 1994: Amal Baraket
- 1995: Amal Baraket
- 1996: Nora Hassani
- 1997: Hadjira Sifouani
- 1998: Nora Hassani
- 1999: Nora Hassani
- 2000: Nora Hassani
- 2001: Nora Hassani
- 2002: Sarah Arrous
- 2003: Samira Harrouche
- 2004: Houria Moussa
- 2005: Houria Moussa
- 2006: Amel Zighem

=== High jump ===
- 1963: Skander
- 1964: ?
- 1965: Possibly not held
- 1966: Farida Chaouch
- 1967: Possibly not held
- 1968: Farida Chaouch
- 1969: ?
- 1970: Farida Chaouch
- 1971: Possibly not held
- 1972: Saihi
- 1973: ?
- 1974: ?
- 1975: ?
- 1976: Yamina Bourzama
- 1977: Yamina Bourzama
- 1978: Yamina Bourzama
- 1979: Yamina Bourzama
- 1980: Dalila Tayebi
- 1981: Nacèra Achir
- 1982: ?
- 1983: Nacèra Achir
- 1984: Nacèra Achir
- 1985: Ramdane Djellaoui
- 1986: Nacèra Zaaboub
- 1987: Nacèra Zaaboub
- 1988: Zahira Attar
- 1989: Nacèra Zaaboub
- 1990: Nacèra Zaaboub
- 1991: Nacèra Zaaboub
- 1992: Radia Mellal
- 1993: Nacèra Zaaboub
- 1994: Nacèra Zaaboub
- 1995: Nacèra Zaaboub
- 1996: Nacèra Zaaboub
- 1997: Zahira Nedjraoui
- 1998: Sarah Bouaoudia
- 1999: Sarah Bouaoudia
- 2000: Hamida Benhocine
- 2001: Nacèra Belgroune
- 2002: Amina Lemgherbi
- 2003: ?
- 2004: Amina Lemgherbi
- 2005: Sarah Bouaoudia
- 2006: Sarah Bouaoudia

=== Pole vault ===
- 1995: Jessika Hellala
- 1996: Mehdia Aïssiou
- 1997: Jessika Hellala
- 1998: Jessika Hellala
- 1999: Amina Chahreddine
- 2000: Amina Chahreddine
- 2001: Sonia Smili
- 2002: Sonia Smili
- 2003: ?
- 2004: Wahiba Hamreras
- 2005: Amina Chahreddine
- 2006: Wahiba Hamreras

=== Long jump ===
- 1963: Nurieffi
- 1964: ?
- 1965: Mouelfi
- 1966: Benmaghnia
- 1967: Rabea Ghezlane
- 1968: Istitene
- 1969: ?
- 1970: Kerdjou
- 1971: Kerdjou
- 1972: Istitene
- 1973: ?
- 1974: ?
- 1975: ?
- 1976: ?
- 1977: Yamina Bourzama
- 1978: Dalila Tayebi
- 1979: Dalila Tayebi
- 1980: Dalila Tayebi
- 1981: Dalila Tayebi
- 1982: Dalila Tayebi
- 1983: Dalila Tayebi
- 1984: Dalila Tayebi
- 1985: Dalila Tayebi
- 1986: Yasmina Azzizi-Kettab
- 1987: Nacèra Zaaboub
- 1988: Nadia Abdou
- 1989: Yasmina Azzizi-Kettab
- 1990: Nacèra Zaaboub
- 1991: Nacèra Zaaboub
- 1992: Saliha Hammadi
- 1993: Naïma Baraket
- 1994: Nacèra Zaaboub
- 1995: Nacèra Zaaboub
- 1996: Nacèra Zaaboub
- 1997: Baya Rahouli
- 1998: Baya Rahouli
- 1999: Baya Rahouli
- 2000: Yasmina Azzizi-Kettab
- 2001: Yasmina Azzizi-Kettab
- 2002: Baya Rahouli
- 2003: ?
- 2004: Baya Rahouli
- 2005: Sarah Bouaoudia
- 2006: Sarah Bouaoudia

=== Triple jump ===
- 1991: Naïma Baraket
- 1992: Naïma Baraket
- 1993: Naïma Baraket
- 1994: Naïma Baraket
- 1995: Baya Rahouli
- 1996: Naïma Baraket
- 1997: Baya Rahouli
- 1998: Rahima Issaad
- 1999: Baya Rahouli
- 2000: Baya Rahouli
- 2001: Baya Rahouli
- 2002: Baya Rahouli
- 2003: Baya Rahouli
- 2004: Baya Rahouli
- 2005: Kamilia Sahnoun
- 2006: Kamilia Sahnoun

=== Shot put ===
- 1963: Atmani
- 1964: ?
- 1965: Atmani
- 1966: Djillali
- 1967: Possibly not held
- 1968: Possibly not held
- 1969: ?
- 1970: Possibly not held
- 1971: Mouhoub
- 1972: Mouhoub
- 1973: Boukraa
- 1974: ?
- 1975: ?
- 1976: ?
- 1977: Fatiha Larab
- 1978: Fatiha Larab
- 1979: Fatiha Larab
- 1980: Aïcha Dahmous
- 1981: Fatiha Larab
- 1982: Fatiha Larab
- 1983: Aïcha Dahmous
- 1984: Aïcha Dahmous
- 1985: Fatiha Larab
- 1986: Fatiha Larab
- 1987: Aïcha Dahmous
- 1988: Fatiha Larab
- 1989: Lamia Naouara (TUN)
- 1990: Nacèra Zaaboub
- 1991: Ghania Touil
- 1992: Malika Hammou
- 1993: Nacèra Zaaboub
- 1994: Yasmina Azzizi-Kettab
- 1995: Yasmina Azzizi-Kettab
- 1996: Yasmina Azzizi-Kettab
- 1997: Baya Rahouli
- 1998: Kenza Hedjène
- 1999: Soraya Mehdioui
- 2000: Yasmina Azzizi-Kettab
- 2001: Nouria Nesnas
- 2002: Yasmina Azzizi-Kettab
- 2003: ?
- 2004: Saliha Zékiski
- 2005: Saliha Zékiski
- 2006: Saliha Zékiski

=== Discus throw ===
- 1963: Atmani
- 1964: ?
- 1965: Atmani
- 1966: ?
- 1967: Possibly not held
- 1968: Rabea Ghezlane
- 1969: Menallah
- 1970: Mouhoub
- 1971: Possibly not held
- 1972: Naziha Moulay
- 1973: Boukraa
- 1974: ?
- 1975: ?
- 1976: ?
- 1977: Djamila Aït Dib
- 1978: Djamila Aït Dib
- 1979: Djamila Aït Dib
- 1980: ?
- 1981: Djamila Aït Dib
- 1982: Aïcha Dahmous
- 1983: Aïcha Dahmous
- 1984: Aïcha Dahmous
- 1985: Aïcha Dahmous
- 1986: Aïcha Dahmous
- 1987: Aïcha Dahmous
- 1988: Aïcha Dahmous
- 1989: Aïcha Dahmous
- 1990: Aïcha Dahmous
- 1991: Ghania Touil
- 1992: Akila Ziane
- 1993: Aïcha Dahmous
- 1994: Malika Hammou
- 1995: Malika Hammou
- 1996: Kenza Hedjène
- 1997: Kenza Hedjène
- 1998: Kenza Hedjène
- 1999: Saliha Zékiski
- 2000: Lamia Hanouti
- 2001: Nouria Nesnas
- 2002: Saliha Zékiski
- 2003: ?
- 2004: Saliha Zékiski
- 2005: Saliha Zékiski
- 2006: Saliha Zékiski

=== Hammer throw ===
- 1993: Samia Dahmani
- 1994: Samia Dahmani
- 1995: Samia Dahmani
- 1996: Samia Dahmani
- 1997: Djida Yalloulène
- 1998: Djida Yalloulène
- 1999: Djida Yalloulène
- 2000: Djida Yalloulène
- 2001: Tounès Messaoudi
- 2002: Rémila Mindjou
- 2003: ?
- 2004: Rémila Mindjou
- 2005: ?
- 2006: Rémila Mindjou

=== Javelin throw ===
- 1963: Possibly not held
- 1964: ?
- 1965: Atmani
- 1966: Belbraik
- 1967: Possibly not held
- 1968: Possibly not held
- 1969: ?
- 1970: Possibly not held
- 1971: Possibly not held
- 1972: Berkane
- 1973: Hamarat
- 1974: ?
- 1975: ?
- 1976: ?
- 1977: Nouria Kédideh
- 1978: Nouria Kédideh
- 1979: Nouria Kédideh
- 1980: Nouria Kédideh
- 1981: Samia Djémaa
- 1982: Nouria Kédideh
- 1983: Nouria Kédideh
- 1984: Samia Djémaa
- 1985: Samia Djémaa
- 1986: Samia Djémaa
- 1987: Samia Djémaa
- 1988: Samia Djémaa
- 1989: Yasmina Azzizi-Kettab
- 1990: Nacèra Zaaboub
- 1991: Malika Hammou
- 1992: Malika Hammou
- 1993: Malika Hammou
- 1994: Yasmina Azzizi-Kettab
- 1995: Yasmina Azzizi-Kettab
- 1996: Yasmina Azzizi-Kettab
- 1997: Rachida Dahmani
- 1998: Faiza Kadri
- 1999: Lynda Kessaï
- 2000: Yasmina Azzizi-Kettab
- 2001: Yasmina Azzizi-Kettab
- 2002: Yasmina Azzizi-Kettab
- 2003: ?
- 2004: Lamia Hanouti
- 2005: Faiza Kadri
- 2006: Zahra Badrane

=== Heptathlon ===
- 1980: ?
- 1981: ?
- 1982: Dalila Tayebi
- 1983: ?
- 1984: Yasmina Azzizi-Kettab
- 1985: Wassila Aïssani
- 1986: Yasmina Azzizi-Kettab
- 1987: ?
- 1988: ?
- 1989: ?
- 1990: ?
- 1991: Nacèra Zaaboub
- 1992: Nacèra Zaaboub
- 1993: ?
- 1994: ?
- 1995: Baya Rahouli
- 1996: Nacèra Zaaboub
- 1997: Sonia Smili
- 1998: Sabrina Baraket
- 1999: Mounia Fetni
- 2000: Yasmina Azzizi-Kettab
- 2001: ?
- 2002: Nacèra Belgroune
- 2003: ?
- 2004: ?
- 2005: Assia Gharbi
- 2006: ?

== Women's road ==
=== Half marathon ===
- 1994: Wassila Aïssani
- 1995: ?
- 1996: Leïla Bendahmane
- 1997: Nasria Baghdad-Azaïdj
- 1998: Faroudja Larabi
- 1999: Nasria Baghdad-Azaïdj
- 2000: Souad Aït Salem
- 2001: Souad Aït Salem
- 2002: ?
- 2003: ?
- 2004: ?
- 2005: Kenza Dahmani
- 2006: ?

=== Marathon ===
- 1989: Dalila Méhira
- 1990: ?
- 1991: Amina Chaabane
- 1992: Amina Chaabane
- 1993: ?
- 1994: ?
- 1995: Hamida Mazouzi
- 1996: Amina Chaabane
- 1997: Wassila Aïssani
- 1998: Dalila Méhira
- 1999: ?
- 2000: Amina Nemri
- 2001: ?
- 2002: ?
- 2003: ?
- 2004: ?
- 2005: Fadil Hamasse
- 2006: ?

=== 5000 metres walk ===
- 1983: Sabiha Mansouri
- 1984: Zahra Oulmi
- 1985: Possibly not held
- 1986: Sabiha Mansouri
- 1987: Sabiha Mansouri
- 1988: Sabiha Mansouri
- 1989: Possibly not held
- 1990: Dounia Kara
- 1991: Dounia Kara
- 1992: Fariza Touat
- 1993: Dounia Kara
- 1994: Dounia Kara
- 1995: Dounia Kara
- 1996: Nabila Yacia
- 1997: Dounia Kara
- 1998: Dounia Kara
- 1999: Dounia Mimouni
- 2000: Dounia Mimouni

=== 5 kilometres walk ===
- 1989: Sabiha Mansouri
- 1998: Dounia Kara

=== 10 kilometres walk ===
- 1987: Sabiha Mansouri
- 1988: Possibly not held
- 1989: Not held
- 1990: Possibly not held
- 1991: Possibly not held
- 1992: Dounia Kara
- 1993: ?
- 1994: ?
- 1995: Dounia Kara
- 1996: Dounia Kara
- 1997: Nabila Yacia
- 1998: Not held
- 1999: Bahia Boussad
- 2000: Bahia Boussad
- 2001: Dounia Mimouni
- 2002: Bahia Boussad
- 2003: ?
- 2004: Bahia Boussad
- 2005: Bahia Boussad

=== 20 kilometres walk ===
- 2005: Bahia Boussad
- 2006: Bahia Boussad

=== Cross country (long course) ===
- 1963: Boussalah
- 1964: Ali Nouri
- 1965: Merabtane
- 1966: Hares
- 1967: A. Addou
- 1968: Naoum
- 1969: Fatima Ariane
- 1970: Fatima Ariane
- 1971: Nabil
- 1972: Goucem Cherfi
- 1973: Goucem Cherfi
- 1974: Farida Hellal
- 1975: Fatma Youcef
- 1976: Sakina Boutamine
- 1977: Sakina Boutamine
- 1978: Sakina Boutamine
- 1979: Leïla Boudina
- 1980: Leïla Boudina
- 1981: Sakina Boutamine
- 1982: Dalila Méhira
- 1983: Dalila Méhira
- 1984: Leïla Bendahmane
- 1985: Mébarka Hadj Abdellah
- 1986: Mébarka Hadj Abdellah
- 1987: Mébarka Hadj Abdellah
- 1988: Mébarka Hadj Abdellah
- 1989: Mébarka Hadj Abdellah
- 1990: Mébarka Hadj Abdellah
- 1991: Zahra Djami Khédim
- 1992: Amina Chaabane
- 1993: Hadda Djakhdjakha
- 1994: Leïla Bendahmane
- 1995: Nasria Baghdad-Azaïdj
- 1996: ?
- 1997: Nasria Baghdad-Azaïdj
- 1998: Fatiha Hanika
- 1999: Nasria Baghdad-Azaïdj
- 2000: Nasria Baghdad-Azaïdj
- 2001: Dalila Tahi
- 2002: ?
- 2003: Nasria Azaiez
- 2004: Nasria Baghdad-Azaïdj
- 2005: Fatiha Bahi Azzouhoum
- 2006: Kenza Dahmani

=== Cross country (short course) ===
- 1998: Kheïra Arfa
- 1999: Khadija Touati
- 2000: Nouria Mérah-Benida
- 2001: Nasria Baghdad-Azaïdj
- 2002: ?
- 2003: Nouria Mérah-Benida
- 2004: Nasria Baghdad-Azaïdj
- 2005: Fatiha Bahi Azzouhoum
