= Algerian Cross Country Championships =

Algerian running competition

- Location: Various, Algeria
- Event type: Cross country
- Distance: 12 km for men 8 km for women

The Algerian Cross Country Championships is an annual cross country running competition that serves as Algeria's national championship for the sport. The main races on the programme are a men's and a women's long course race. Short course races for men and women have been held historically, but not since 2006.

The most successful athlete of the competition is Nasria Baghdad-Azaïdj, who won eight national titles in the women's long race between 1995 and 2004, as well as three further titles in the short race. Khoudir Aggoune is the most successful man, having won three long course titles and four short course titles between 2002 and 2009. Rabah Aboud and Yahia Azaidj have both won the men's long race on four occasions. Kenza Dahmani is a seven-time women's long course champion, while Mebarka Hadj Abdellah has six.

== Past senior race winners ==
Date	Location	Men's winner	Women's winner
26 Feb 2016	Aïn Defla	Mohammed Merbouhi	Nawel Yahi
28 Feb 2015	Tizi Ouzou	Rabah Aboud	Souad Aït Salemb
15 Feb 2014	Batna	Rabah Aboud	Amina Bettiche
16 Feb 2013	Djelfa	Rabah Aboud	Kenza Dahmani
03 Mar 2012	Chlef	Abdelhamid Mousaoui	Kenza Dahmani
26 Feb 2011	Sétif	Rabah Aboud	Kenza Dahmani
20 Feb 2010	Tizi Ouzou	Slimane Mouley	Abla benDebbah
06 Mar 2009	Tébessa	Khoudir Aggoune	Kenza Dahmani
14 Mar 2008	Bordj Bou Arréridj	Khoudir Aggoune	Kenza Dahmani
22 Feb 2007	Algiers	Yahia Azaidj	Kenza Dahmani
16 Mar 2006	Biskra	Ahmed Naili	Kenza Dahmani
24 Feb 2005	Tlemcen	Khoudir Aggoune	Fatiha Bahi Azouhoum
05 Mar 2004	Algiers	Ahmed Naili	Nasria Baghdad-Azaïdj
07 Mar 2003	Algiers	Kamel Kohil	Nasria Baghdad-Azaïdj
2002	Djelfa	Samir Moussaoui	Nasria Baghdad-Azaïdj
2001	Tébessa	Samir Moussaouis	Dalila Tahi
2000	Chlef	Miloud Abaoub	Nasria Baghdad-Azaïdj
1999	Tlemcen	Kamel Kohil	Nasria Baghdad-Azaïdj
1998	Algiers	Azzedine Sakhri	Fatiha Hanika
1997	Tébessa	Kamel Kohil	Nasria Baghdad-Azaïdj
1996	Algiers	Yahia Azaidj	Nasria Baghdad-Azaïdj
1995	El Kala	Azzedine Sakhri	Nasria Baghdad-Azaïdj
1994	Algiers	Yahia Azaidj	Leila ben Dahmane
1993	Jijel	Yahia Azaidj	Hadda Djakhdjakha
1992	Oran	Mourad Bouldjadj	Amina Chabane
1991	Bordj Bou Arréridj	Maheiddine Belhadj	Fatma Zohra
1990	Tlemcen	Mohamed Diffalah	Mebarka Hadj Abdellah
1989	Ouled Fayet	Abbes Tehami	Mebarka Hadj Abdellah
1988	Béjaïa	Abbes Tehami	Mebarka Hadj Abdellah
1987	Oran	Maheiddine Belhadj	Mebarka Hadj Abdellah
1986	Draâ Ben Khedda	El Asmani Merzougui	Mebarka Hadj Abdellah
1985	Chlef	Abderrazak Bounour	Mebarka Hadj Abdellah
1984	Algiers	Rachid Habchaoui	Leila ben Dahmane
1983	Algiers	Boualem Rahoui	Dalila Mehira
1982	Algiers	El Hachemi Abdenouz	Dalila Mehira
06 Mar 1981	Algiers	El Hachemi Abdenouz	Sakina Boutamine
1980	Oran	Rachid Habchaoui	Leila Boudina
1979	Algiers	Ahcene Babaci	Leila Boudina
1978	Algiers	Boualem Rahoui	Sakina Boutamine
06 Mar 1977	Algiers	Mahmoud Hazzazi	Sakina Boutamine
1976	Algiers	Boualem Rahoui	Sakina Boutamine
16 Feb 1975	Algiers	Djelloul Rezigue	Fatima Youcef
1974	Algiers	Mohamed Kacemi	Farida Hellal
1973	Algiers	Cherif Benali	Goucem Cherfi
1972	Algiers	Mohamed Gouasmi	Goucem Cherfi
13 Feb 1971	Algiers	Mohamed Kacemi	Khadidja Nabeul
1970	Algiers	Mohamed Gouasmi	Rachida Ariane
1969		Ali Ferchichi	Rachida Ariane
1968	Algiers	Aissa Benfares	Naoum
1967	Algiers	Aissa Benfares	Latifa Addou
1966	Algiers	Abdelkader ben Yettou	Habes
07 Mar 1965	Algiers	Hmida Addeche	Merabtene
1964	Oran	Mohamed ben Sahraoui	Malika Ali Nouri
1963	Algiers	Ahcene Delhoum	D Boussalah
