= 1983 Maghreb Athletics Championships =

9th Maghreb Athletics Championships
- Dates: 15–17 July
- Host city: Casablanca, Morocco
- Events: 39
- Participation: 4 nations

The 1983 Maghreb Athletics Championships was the ninth edition of the international athletics competition between the countries of the Maghreb. Morocco, Algeria, Tunisia and Libya were the competing nations. Organised by the Union des Fédérations d'Athlétisme du Maghreb Uni (Union of Athletics Federations of the United Maghreb), it took place in Casablanca, Morocco from 15 to 17 July. A total of 39 athletics events were contested, 23 for men and 16 for women.

Morocco and Algeria each won fifteen gold medals at the competition, with Morocco edging the top spot through its haul of 16 silver medals. Tunisia was a comfortable third, while Libya won two gold medals in the men's horizontal jumps. It was the third and last time that Libya attended the Maghreb Championships. The competition was staged one month prior to the wider regional 1983 Arab Athletics Championships.

The event was part of a flourish of athletics championships in the mid-1980s in Casablanca, Morocco's largest city. The Mediterranean Games was held two months after the Maghreb event. This was followed by the 1984 Arab Junior Athletics Championships, and finally the 1985 Pan Arab Games.

== Medal summary ==
=== Men ===
Event	Gold		Silver		Bronze	
100 metres	Ali Bakhta (ALG)	10.3	Omar Ghizlat (MAR)	10.4	Abdelali Kasbane (MAR)	10.5
200 metres	Ali Bakhta (ALG)	21.2	Brahim Amour (ALG)	21.6	Habib Dhouibi (TUN)	21.9
400 metres	Habib Dhouibi (TUN)	47.0	Brahim Amour (ALG)	47.3	Saïd M'Hand (MAR)	47.3
800 metres	Saïd Aouita (MAR)	1:49.1	Mohamed Alouini (TUN)	1:49.9	Mohamed Zahafi (MAR)	1:50.0
1500 metres	Saïd Aouita (MAR)	3:35.6	Abderrahmane Morceli (ALG)	3:40.1	Mohamed Zahafi (MAR)	3:41.0
5000 metres	Féthi Baccouche (TUN)	14:29.7	Abderrazak Bounour (ALG)	14:30.4	El Hachemi Abdenouz (ALG)	14:31.9
10,000 metres	Boualem Rahoui (ALG)	29:55.5	Larbi El Mouadden (MAR)	30:00.9	Rachid Habchaoui (ALG)	30:07.3
110 m hurdles	Noureddine Tadjine (ALG)	14.1	Saïd Kahia (MAR)	14.4	Ahmed Chiboub (MAR)	14.6
400 m hurdles	Khalid Regoug (MAR)	52.2	Abdelmoula Aziz (MAR)	52.8	Khalifa Khémiri (TUN)	53.3
3000 metres steeplechase	Féthi Baccouche (TUN)	8:34.1	Hamid Hommada (MAR)	8:36.8	Rabah Aboura (ALG)	8:48.5
4 × 100 m relay	Morocco (MAR)	42.0	Libya (LBA); Ahmed Mohamed Sallouma	42.3	Tunisia (TUN)	42.4
4 × 400 m relay	Algeria (ALG)	3:09.7	Tunisia (TUN)	3:09.7	Morocco (MAR)	3:10.2
Marathon	Abdelaziz Bouguerra (TUN)	2:23:43	Mohamed Abaidia (ALG)	2:27:52	Houcine El Mekni (TUN)	2:36:42
20,000 m walk	Benamar Kachkouche (ALG)	1:32:38.0	Abdelwahab Ferguène (ALG)	1:32:38.1	Mohamed Kouchaoui (MAR)	1:44:45.0
High jump	Othmane Belfaa (ALG)	2.18 m	Mohamed Aghlal (MAR)	2.13 m	Abdenour Krim (ALG)	2.13 m
Pole vault	Djamel Bouzerar (ALG)	4.50 m	Choukri Abahnini (TUN)	4.50 m	Mohamed Bouihiri (MAR)	4.40 m
Long jump	Mohamed Abdusalam Bishti (LBA)	7.55 m	Ahmed Benazoug (ALG)	7.21 m	Bachir Messikh (ALG)	7.15 m
Triple jump	Fethi Khelid Aboud (LBA)	15.78 m	Saïd Saad (ALG)	15.68 m	El Mustapha Aouchar (MAR)	15.21 m
Shot put	Mohamed Fatihi (MAR)	18.02 m	Abderrazak Ben Hassine (TUN)	15.11 m	Néjib Dimassi (TUN)	14.99 m
Discus throw	Abderrazak Ben Hassine (TUN)	53.74 m	Mohamed Fatihi (MAR)	50.50 m	Yacine Louail (ALG)	50.12 m
Hammer throw	Hakim Toumi (ALG)	67.84 m	Youssef Ben Abid (TUN)	54.18 m	Hassan Chahine (MAR)	50.42 m
Javelin throw	Tarek Chaabani (TUN)	73.02 m	Mohamed Karakhi (MAR)	72.68 m	Mongi Alimi (TUN)	69.48 m
Decathlon	Mohamed Bensaad (ALG)	7180 pts	Abdennacer Moumen (MAR)	6735 pts	Mourad Mahour Bacha (ALG)	6708 pts

=== Women ===
Event	Gold		Silver		Bronze	
100 metres	Naïma Baraiz (MAR)	12.3	Zeineb Ben Sma (TUN)	12.4	Fatima Mefti (ALG)	12.4
200 metres	Nawal El Moutawakel (MAR)	24.0	Rachida Ferdjaoui (ALG)	25.3	Selma Anane (TUN)	25.9
400 metres	Fatiha Salahi (MAR)	54.8	Chaïbia Bilali (MAR)	55.5	Sarra Touibi (TUN)	56.7
800 metres	Chaïbia Bilali (MAR)	2:08.9	Fatima Aouam (MAR)	2:09.4	Sarra Touibi (TUN)	2:10.4
1500 metres	Hassania Darami (MAR)	4:31.7	Dalila Méhira (ALG)	4:34.4	Leïla M'Hamdi (MAR)	4:35.9
3000 metres	Dalila Méhira (ALG)	9:50.2	Hassania Darami (MAR)	9:53.8	Leila Bendahmane (ALG)	9:57.0
100 m hurdles	Nawal El Moutawakel (MAR)	13.4	Basma Gharbi (TUN)	14.5	Karima Henni (ALG)	14.5
400 m hurdles	Nawal El Moutawakel (MAR)	58.5	Fatiha Salahi (MAR)	60.5	Rachida Ferdjaoui (ALG)	62.5
4 × 100 m relay	Morocco (MAR)	47.2	Algeria (ALG)	47.9	Tunisia (TUN)	48.4
4 × 400 m relay	Morocco (MAR)	3:45.9	Tunisia (TUN)	3:51.2	Algeria (ALG)	3:53.0
High jump	Kawther Akrémi (TUN)	1.78 m	Nacèra Achir (ALG)	1.68 m	Lamia Ben Ali (TUN)	1.65 m
Long jump	Dalila Tayebi (ALG)	5.98 m	Basma Gharbi (TUN)	5.87 m	Kawther Akrémi (TUN)	5.72 m
Shot put	Aïcha Dahmous (ALG)	14.41 m	Souad Malloussi (MAR)	14.15 m	Fatiha Larab (ALG)	13.58 m
Discus throw	Zoubida Laayouni (MAR)	50.92 m	Aïcha Dahmous (ALG)	47.16 m	Latifa Nefzaoui (TUN)	40.56 m
Javelin throw	Nouria Kédideh (ALG)	48.20 m	Fatiha Belamghar (MAR)	44.46 m	Samia Djemaa (ALG)	43.20 m
Heptathlon	Dalila Tayebi (ALG)	5555 pts	Chérifa Meskaoui (MAR)	4927 pts	Nacèra Achir (ALG)	4887 pts
