= 1981 Arab Athletics Championships =

3rd Arab Athletics Championships
- Dates: 21–24 August
- Host city: Tunis, Tunisia
- Events: 39

The 1981 Arab Athletics Championships was the third edition of the international athletics competition between Arab countries. It took place in Tunis, Tunisia from 21 to 24 August. It was the first occasion that the tournament was hosted in Africa. A total of 39 athletics events were contested, 23 for men and 16 for women. The men's 20 kilometres walk was held for the first time – being the first Arab walking championship race since the 1965 Pan Arab Games. The women's programme, following its debut in 1979 with ten events, was greatly expanded. Relays, hurdles, heptathlon and distance events were all opened up to women athletes.

== Medal summary ==
=== Men ===
Event	Gold		Silver		Bronze	
100 metres	Omar Ghizlat (MAR)	10.59	Rashid Al Jirbi (UAE)	10.62	Mohamed El Guinzi (MAR)	10.74
200 metres	Hassan El Kashief (SUD)	21.44	Rashid Al Jirbi (UAE)	21.66	Hassen Ali Lafta (IRQ)	21.89
400 metres	Hassan El Kashief (SUD)	45.35	Amar Brahmia (ALG)	46.91	Khalil Ibrahim Salem (UAE)	47.49
800 metres	Omer Khalifa (SUD)	1:48.44	Amar Brahmia (ALG)	1:48.97	Faouzi Lahbi (MAR)	1:49.25
1500 metres	Omer Khalifa (SUD)	3:39.88	Mehdi Aidet (ALG)	3:40.02	Saïd Aouita (MAR)	3:59.28
5000 metres	Rachid Habchaoui (ALG)	13:54.47	Hassen Babassi (ALG)	13:56.41	Féthi Baccouche (TUN)	13:57.70
10,000 metres	Rachid Habchaoui (ALG)	28:56.8	Ahmed Musa Jouda (SUD)	28:59.0	Abdelmajid Mada (ALG)	29:31.9
110 metres hurdles	Riad Benhaddad (ALG)	14.45	Ahmed Chiboub (MAR)	14.50	Hassen Ali Hassen (IRQ)	14.62
400 metres hurdles	Ahmed Hamada Jassim (BHR)	51.83	Jassem El Yakout (KUW)	52.09	Ahmed Chiboub (MAR)	52.52
3000 metres steeplechase	Lahcene Babaci (ALG)	8:32.32	Féthi Baccouche (TUN)	8:32.34	Abderrazak Bounour (ALG)	8:51.27
4 × 100 m relay	Saudi Arabia (KSA)	41.30	Iraq (IRQ)	41.46	Qatar (QAT)	41.59
4 × 400 m relay	Algeria (ALG)	3:10.62	Morocco (MAR)	3:12.36	Bahrain (BHR)	3:15.45
Marathon	Abderrahman Aedh (QAT)	2:49:13	Houcine Makni (TUN)	2:50:52	Ahmed Alawi (QAT)	2:55:56
20 km walk	Benamar Kachkouche (ALG)	1:41:32	Abdelwahab Ferguène (ALG)	1:41:40	Mohamed El Bouichi Shehoub (LBA)	2:08:06
High jump	Habib Ali Raban (KSA)	2.06 m	Hedi Kefah (IRQ)	2.00 m	Ghazi Saleh Marzouk (KSA)	2.00 m
Pole vault	Mohamed Bensaad (ALG)	4.60 m	Abdelatif Chekir (TUN)	4.50 m	Djamel Bouzerar (ALG)	4.30 m
Long jump	Nassir Hassan (IRQ)	7.25 m	Mehdi Khadum (IRQ)	7.20 m	Aissa Abbes (KUW)	6.94 m
Triple jump	Nasir Hussein Jassim (IRQ)	15.61 m	Mehdi Khadum (IRQ)	15.55 m		
Shot put	Mohammed Al-Zinkawi (KUW)	17.25 m	Mohamed Fatihi (MAR)	16.52 m	Shokr Mahmoud (IRQ)	16.41 m
Discus throw	Abderrazak Ben Hassine (TUN)	51.46 m	Adnan Houry (SYR)	49.08 m	Shawki Hajji (IRQ)	47.40 m
Hammer throw	Hakim Toumi (ALG)	52.43 m	Abdellah Boubekeur (ALG)	45.44 m	Youssef Ben Abid (TUN)	52.43 m
Javelin throw	Tarek Chaabani (TUN)	71.50 m	Hany Abd Walid (IRQ)	71.46 m	Ali Memmi (TUN)	66.66 m
Decathlon	Ahmed Mahour Bacha (ALG)	7495 pts	Mohamed Bensaad (ALG)	7366 pts	Abdessatar Mouelhi (TUN)	6882 pts

=== Women ===
Event	Gold		Silver		Bronze	
100 metres	Nawal El Moutawakel (MAR)	11.86	Lamia Benkhraba (MAR)	12.27	Anouar Abdelmohsen (IRQ)	12.70
200 metres	Nawal El Moutawakel (MAR)	24.30	Lamia Benkhraba (MAR)	25.26	Anouar Abdelmohsen (IRQ)	25.90
400 metres	Dalila Baouche (ALG)	59.12	Sarra Touibi (TUN)	59.32	Samira Letaief (TUN)	1:01.11
800 metres	Leïla M'Hamdi (MAR)	2:10.80	Rachida Oueslati (TUN)	2:11.27	Halima Hidri (TUN)	2:13.80
1500 metres	Hassania Darami (MAR)	4:26.95	Rachida Oueslati (TUN)	4:32.71	Dalila Méhira (ALG)	4:33.54
3000 metres	Hassania Darami (MAR)	9:33.71	Latifa Dérouiche (TUN)	10:04.22	Dalila Méhira (ALG)	10:09.72
100 metres hurdles	Chérifa Meskaoui (MAR)	15.07	Zahra Azaiez (TUN)	16.08	Kawther Akrémi (TUN)	16.41
400 metres hurdles	Basma Gharbi (TUN)	1:04.95	Sihem Abbès (TUN)	1:06.39	Only two finishers	
4 × 100 m relay	Morocco (MAR)	47.89	Tunisia (TUN)	49.81	Jordan (JOR)	56.54
4 × 400 m relay	Morocco (MAR)	3:51.28	Tunisia (TUN)	3:55.83	Only two finishers ^{[nb]}	
High jump	Kawther Akrémi (TUN)	1.74 m	Habiba Mosleh (MAR)	1.66 m	Raya Tatunji (SYR)	1.63 m
Long jump	Dalila Tayebi (ALG)	5.82 m	Zahra Azaiez (TUN)	5.75 m	Basma Gharbi (TUN)	5.37 m
Shot put	Chérifa Meskaoui (MAR)	12.21 m	Souad Malloussi (MAR)	12.11 m	Fatiha Larab (ALG)	11.57 m
Discus throw	Zoubida Laayouni (MAR)	49.88 m	Fathia Jerbi (TUN)	47.70 m	Djamila Aït Dib (ALG)	44.42 m
Javelin throw	Fatiha Belamghar (MAR)	47.18 m	Nouria Kédideh (ALG)	44.02 m	Samia Djémaa (ALG)	42.88 m
Heptathlon	Dalila Tayebi (ALG)	5128 pts	Chérifa Meskaoui (MAR)	5125 pts	Zahra Azaiez (TUN)	4675 pts

- ^{nb} A third team, from South Yemen, was disqualified in the women's race 4 × 400 m relay.

== Medal table ==
=== Overall ===
Rank	Nation	Gold	Silver	Bronze	Total
1	Morocco (MAR)	12	9	4	25
2	Algeria (ALG)	12	8	8	28
3	Tunisia (TUN)	4	13	10	27
4	Sudan (SUD)	4	1	0	5
5	Iraq (IRQ)	2	5	5	12
6	Saudi Arabia (KSA)	2	0	1	3
7	Kuwait (KUW)	1	1	2	4
8	Qatar (QAT)	1	0	2	3
9	Bahrain (BHR)	1	0	1	2
10	United Arab Emirates (UAE)	0	2	1	3
11	Jordan (JOR)	0	0	1	1
11	Libya (LBA)	0	0	1	1
11	Syria	0	0	1	1
14	Lebanon (LIB)	0	0	0	0
14	Palestine (PLE)	0	0	0	0
14	South Yemen (YMD)	0	0	0	0
Totals (16 entries)		39	39	37	115

=== Men ===
Rank	Nation	Gold	Silver	Bronze	Total
1	Algeria (ALG)	9	7	3	19
2	Sudan (SUD)	4	1	0	5
3	Iraq (IRQ)	2	5	3	10
4	Tunisia (TUN)	2	3	5	10
5	Saudi Arabia (KSA)	2	0	1	3
6	Morocco (MAR)	1	4	4	9
7	Kuwait (KUW)	1	1	2	4
8	Qatar (QAT)	1	0	2	3
9	Bahrain (BHR)	1	0	1	2
10	United Arab Emirates (UAE)	0	2	1	3
11	Libya (LBA)	0	0	1	1
12	Jordan (JOR)	0	0	0	0
12	Lebanon (LIB)	0	0	0	0
12	Palestine (PLE)	0	0	0	0
12	South Yemen (YMD)	0	0	0	0
12	Syria	0	0	0	0
Totals (16 entries)		23	23	23	69

=== Women ===
Rank	Nation	Gold	Silver	Bronze	Total
1	Morocco (MAR)	11	5	0	16
2	Algeria (ALG)	3	1	5	9
3	Tunisia (TUN)	2	10	5	17
4	Iraq (IRQ)	0	0	2	2
5	Jordan (JOR)	0	0	1	1
5	Syria	0	0	1	1
7	South Yemen (YMD)	0	0	0	0
Totals (7 entries)		16	16	14	46
