= 1986 Maghreb Athletics Championships =

10th Maghreb Athletics Championships
- Dates: 7–9 August
- Host city: Tunis, Tunisia
- Events: 39
- Participation: 3 nations

The 1986 Maghreb Athletics Championships was the tenth edition of the international athletics competition between the countries of the Maghreb. Morocco, Algeria and Tunisia were the competing nations. Organised by the Union des Fédérations d'Athlétisme du Maghreb Uni (Union of Athletics Federations of the United Maghreb), it took place in Tunis, Tunisia from 7–9 August. A total of 39 athletics events were contested, 23 for men and 16 for women. The Maghreb men's marathon was held for the third and final time at the tournament.

Algeria topped the table, winning more than half the events on offer. Tunisia was the runner-up with eleven gold medals. The competition was affected by strong winds and many of the marks in the sprints and horizontal jumps were wind-assisted. The men's 10,000 metres race was not timed to international standards.

== Medal summary ==
=== Men ===
Event	Gold		Silver		Bronze	
100 metres (wind: +3.8 m/s)	Mustapha Kamel Selmi (ALG)	10.41w	Karim Benrahal (ALG)	10.50w	Messaoud Fguiri (TUN)	10.56w
200 metres	Mustapha Kamel Selmi (ALG)	21.09	Mohamed El Kandoussi (MAR)	21.13	Ali Bakhta (ALG)	21.17
400 metres	Mohamed Filali (ALG)	48.11	Mahrez Djémaa (ALG)	48.23	Ali Bakhta (ALG)	48.26
800 metres	Faouzi Lahbi (MAR)	1:52.16	Ahmed Belkessam (ALG)	1:52.93	Mohamed Soltana (ALG)	1:53.16
1500 metres	Faouzi Lahbi (MAR)	4:00.05	Rachid Kram (ALG)	4:01.58	Abbès Tehami (ALG)	4:01.69
5000 metres	Habib Romdhani (TUN)	14:22.14	Larbi El Mouadden (MAR)	14:27.96	Mohamed Saleh Rahji (TUN)	14:32.89
10,000 metres	Habib Romdhani (TUN)	n/a	Larbi El Mouadden (MAR)	n/a	Abderrazak Gtari (TUN)	n/a
110 m hurdles (wind: +4.3 m/s)	Noureddine Tadjine (ALG)	13.9w	Riad Benhaddad (ALG)	14.2w	Fadhel Khayati (TUN)	14.6w
400 m hurdles	Fadhel Khayati (TUN)	52.11	Adel Jemmali (TUN)	53.35	Abdelhak Touhami (MAR)	53.59
3000 metres steeplechase	Féthi Baccouche (TUN)	8:36.49	Azzedine Brahmi (ALG)	8:42.04	Mohamed Difallah (ALG)	8:47.92
4 × 100 m relay	Algeria (ALG)	41.10	Morocco (MAR)	42.08	Tunisia (TUN)	42.90
4 × 400 m relay	Algeria (ALG)	3:09.8	Morocco (MAR)	3:15.5	Tunisia (TUN)	3:16.4
Marathon	Mohamed Abaidia (ALG)	2:29:13	Arezki Hamadache (ALG)	2:30:06	Sid-Ali Sakhri (ALG)	2:36:01
20 km walk	Abdelwahab Ferguène (ALG)	1:36:19	Mohamed Haddadou (ALG)	1:53:28	Arezki Boumrar (ALG)	1:54:21
High jump	Nabil Berbiche (ALG)	2.08 m	Abdennacer Moumen (MAR)	2.05 m	Hatem Bachar (TUN)	1.95 m
Pole vault	Choukri Abahnini (TUN)	4.83 m	Abdelatif Chekir (TUN)	4.60 m	Sid Ali Sabour (ALG)	4.50 m
Long jump	Mustapha Benmrah (MAR)	7.55w m	Mohamed El Aïd Zaghdoudi (TUN)	7.41 m w	Nacer Saadoune (ALG)	7.32 m
Triple jump	Abdelhamid Sekkaï (ALG)	15.74 m w	Mustapha Benmrah (MAR)	15.43 m w	Lotfi Khaïda (ALG)	15.40 m
Shot put	Mohamed Fatihi (MAR)	15.90 m	Sami Samir (TUN)	15.42 m	Ahmed Mahour Bacha (ALG)	14.06 m
Discus throw	Abderrazak Ben Hassine (TUN)	49.06 m	Yacine Louail (ALG)	48.46 m	Mounir Dimassi (TUN)	43.22 m
Hammer throw	Hakim Toumi (ALG)	66.82 m	Yacine Louail (ALG)	65.78 m	Djamel Zouiche (ALG)	59.78 m
Javelin throw	Tarek Chaabani (TUN)	73.08 m	Ahmed Mahour Bacha (ALG)	70.20 m	Mongi Alimi (TUN)	67.88 m
Decathlon	Hatem Bachar (TUN)	6802 pts	Mahmoud Aït Ouhamou (ALG)	5890 pts	Anis Driss (TUN)	5807 pts

=== Women ===
Event	Gold		Silver		Bronze	
100 metres (wind: +5.4 m/s)	Mahdjouba Bouhdiba (ALG)	11.93w	Méryem Oumezdi (MAR)	11.99w	Lamia Makni (TUN)	12.00w
200 metres	Lamia Makni (TUN)	24.72	Mahdjouba Bouhdiba (ALG)	24.83	Zeineb Ben Sma (TUN)	25.55
400 metres	Hassiba Hallilou (ALG)	57.68	Hend Kebaoui (TUN)	58.31	Halima Hadri (MAR)	58.95
800 metres	Hassiba Boulmerka (ALG)	2:13.91	Sabah Ben Nasr (TUN)	2:14.87	Salima Djelloul (ALG)	2:15.36
1500 metres	Mebarka Hadj Abdellah (ALG)	4:38.58	Dalila Mial (ALG)	4:41.02	Zohra Koulou (MAR)	4:43.19
3000 metres	Mebarka Hadj Abdellah (ALG)	9:43.26	Dalila Mial (ALG)	9:47.86	Zohra Koulou (MAR)	9:50.77
100 m hurdles (wind: +4.7 m/s)	Yasmina Azzizi (ALG)	13.90w	Nacèra Zaaboub (ALG)	14.07w	Najia Méziane (MAR)	15.15w
400 m hurdles	Rachida Ferdjaoui (ALG)	62.28	Hend Kebaoui (TUN)	62.84	Hasna Dhébaïbi (TUN)	64.72
4 × 100 m relay	Morocco (MAR)	48.21	Tunisia (TUN)	48.54	Algeria (ALG)	49.14
4 × 400 m relay	Algeria (ALG)	3:47.7	Tunisia (TUN)	3:49.6	Morocco (MAR)	4:01.8
High jump	Nacèra Zaaboub (ALG)	1.74 m	Kawther Akrémi (TUN)	1.69 m	Rym Fatma Guizani (TUN)	1.59 m
Long jump	Kawther Akremi (TUN)	5.79 m	Basma Gharbi (TUN)	5.78 m w	Nora Belhoua (ALG)	5.46 m w
Shot put	Aïcha Dahmous (ALG)	13.78 m	Fatiha Larab (ALG)	12.62 m	Latifa Nefzaoui (TUN)	12.45 m
Discus throw	Nabila Mouelhi (TUN)	46.96 m	Aïcha Dahmous (ALG)	46.80 m	Latifa Nefzaoui (TUN)	40.40 m
Javelin throw	Samia Djemaa (ALG)	53.04 m	Hayet Ben Slama (TUN)	41.18 m	Lamia Naouara (TUN)	34.50 m
Heptathlon	Yasmina Azzizi (ALG)	5483 pts	Nacèra Zaaboub (ALG)	4270 pts	Nadia Messadi (TUN)	3852 pts
