= 1990 Maghreb Athletics Championships =

11th Maghreb Athletics Championships
- Dates: ~27 July
- Host city: Algiers, Algeria
- Events: 40
- Participation: 3 nations

The 1990 Maghreb Athletics Championships was the eleventh and final edition of the international athletics competition between the countries of the Maghreb. Morocco, Algeria and Tunisia were the competing nations. Organised by the Union des Fédérations d'Athlétisme du Maghreb Uni (Union of Athletics Federations of the United Maghreb), it took place in Algiers, Algeria around 27 July. A total of 40 athletics events were contested, 22 for men and 18 for women. Morocco topped the medal table, followed by Algeria.

A women's 10,000 metres and 5000 metres walk were contested for the first time.

== Medal summary ==
=== Men ===
Event	Gold		Silver		Bronze	
100 metres	Benyoucef Aïssa Khalifa (ALG)	10.76	Abdelkader El Boukhari (MAR)	10.84	Mustapha Kamel Selmi (ALG)	10.88
200 metres	Abdelkader El Boukhari (MAR)	21.51	Ali Dahane (MAR)	21.55	Mustapha Kamel Selmi (ALG)	21.58
400 metres	Benyounés Lahlou (MAR)	45.97	Amar Hecin (ALG)	46.48	Mohamed Filali (ALG)	47.05
800 metres	Réda Abdenouz (ALG)	1:49.65	Ahmed Belkessam (ALG)	1:49.91	Rachid El Basir (MAR)	1:49.94
1500 metres	Noureddine Morceli (ALG)	4:05.66	Mahmoud El Kandoussi (TUN)	4:06.28	Rachid El Basir (MAR)	4:07.09
5000 metres	Khalid Boulami (MAR)	14:26.23	Mohamed Belabbès (ALG)	14:28.10	Brahim Boudina (ALG)	14:29.24
10,000 metres	Khalid Boulami (MAR)	29:48.52	Mohamed Kamel Selmi (ALG)	29:55.92	Mohamed Difallah (ALG)	31:37.46
110 m hurdles	Noureddine Tadjine (ALG)	13.8	Mustapha Sdad (MAR)	14.2	Fadhel Khayati (TUN)	14.5
400 m hurdles	Fadhel Khayati (TUN)	49.83	Abdelhak Touhami (MAR)	50.75	Mohamed Debbab (MAR)	51.89
3000 metres steeplechase	Azzedine Brahmi (ALG)	9:28.54	Hassan Ouhrouch (MAR)	9:30.77	Mustapha Bedjaoui (MAR)	9:31.12
4 × 100 m relay	Morocco (MAR)	40.71	Algeria (ALG)	40.76	Tunisia (TUN)	42.38
4 × 400 m relay	Morocco (MAR)	3:06.53	Algeria (ALG)	3:07.35	Tunisia (TUN)	3:15.96
20,000 m walk	Mohamed Bouhalla (ALG)	1:32:41.2	H'mimed Rahouli (ALG)	1:33:20.0	Mustapha Boulal (MAR)	1:37:06.9
High jump	Othmane Belfaa (ALG)	2.20 m	Yacine Mousli (ALG)	2.05 m	Abderrahmane Taizi (MAR)	2.05 m
Pole vault	Samir Agsous (ALG)	5.05 m	Sami Si Mohamed (ALG)	5.00 m	Issam Ben Mohamed (TUN)	4.90 m
Long jump	Lotfi Khaïda (ALG)	7.65 m	Nadir Si Mohamed (ALG)	7.30 m	Mohamed El Aïd Zaghdoudi (TUN)	7.29 m
Triple jump	Lotfi Khaïda (ALG)	16.44 m	Mohamed Karim Sassi (TUN)	15.64 m	Soulimane Ouabel (ALG)	15.31 m
Shot put	Mohamed Fatihi (MAR)	16.40 m	Sami Samir (TUN)	15.96 m	Khalid Fatihi (MAR)	15.46 m
Discus throw	Yacine Louail (ALG)	50.14 m	Khalid Fatihi (MAR)	48.36 m	Salim Bekhli (ALG)	45.54 m
Hammer throw	Hakim Toumi (ALG)	67.94 m	Djamel Zouiche (ALG)	63.06 m	Hassan Chahine (MAR)	61.08 m
Javelin throw	Tarek Chaabani (TUN)	62.54 m	Ahmed Roudane (MAR)	62.06 m	Abderrahim Jannour (MAR)	60.78 m
Decathlon	Abdennacer Moumen (MAR)	7076 pts	Mourad Mahour Bacha (ALG)	7026 pts	Hassan Jaljalane (MAR)	6548 pts

=== Women ===
Event	Gold		Silver		Bronze	
100 metres	Nezha Bidouane (MAR)	11.7	Nadia Abdou (ALG)	11.8	Latifa Lahcen (MAR)	12.3
200 metres	Nezha Bidouane (MAR)	24.07	Nadia Abdou (ALG)	24.85	Hend Kebaoui (TUN)	25.35
400 metres	Hend Kebaoui (TUN)	54.9	Méryem Lahmadi (MAR)	55.4	Amal Boudjelti (ALG)	56.6
800 metres	Hassiba Boulmerka (ALG)	2:04.05	Méryem Lahmadi (MAR)	2:05.32	Souad Kouhaïl (MAR)	2:10.79
1500 metres	Hassiba Boulmerka (ALG)	4:21.48	Mebarka Hadj Abdellah (ALG)	4:23.28	Méryem Lahmadi (MAR)	4:25.30
3000 metres	Souad Nakour (MAR)	9:37.13	Mebarka Hadj Abdellah (ALG)	9:42.60	Houda Chabbouh (TUN)	10:20.09
10,000 metres	Souad Nakour (MAR)	34:59.79	Dalila Mial (ALG)	35:53.72	Sonia Agoun (TUN)	???
100 m hurdles	Nezha Bidouane (MAR)	13.6	Yasmina Azzizi (ALG)	13.9	Nacèra Zaaboub (ALG)	14.0
400 m hurdles	Nezha Bidouane (MAR)	56.3	Hend Kebaoui (TUN)	59.8	Nadia Zétouani (MAR)	60.0
4 × 100 m relay	Algeria (ALG)	47.12	Morocco (MAR)	48.12	Tunisia (TUN)	49.52
4 × 400 m relay	Morocco (MAR)	3:42.80	Algeria (ALG)	3:47.54	Tunisia (TUN)	3:58.36
5000 metres walk	Samira Benaïm (ALG)	30:33.17	Only one starter			
High jump	Nadia Htitou (MAR)	1.73 m	Nacèra Zaaboub (ALG)	1.73 m	Naima Houssam (MAR)	1.65 m
Long jump	Hend Kebaoui (TUN)	5.84 m	Nacèra Zaaboub (ALG)	5.77 m	Marjane Rabah (TUN)	5.73 m
Shot put	Fouzia Fatihi (MAR)	14.02 m	Latifa Nefzaoui (TUN)	13.55 m	Lamia Naouara (TUN)	13.10 m
Discus throw	Zoubida Laayouni (MAR)	54.00 m	Nabila Mouelhi (TUN)	49.42 m	Latifa Allam (MAR)	45.74 m
Javelin throw	Rkia Ramoudi (MAR)	45.70 m	???	??? m	Ghania Touil (ALG)	27.76 m
Heptathlon	Nacèra Zaaboub (ALG)	5363 pts	Fatiha Meskaoui (MAR)	4712 pts	Naima Houssam (MAR)	4274 pts
