= 1981 Maghreb Athletics Championships =

8th Maghreb Athletics Championships
- Dates: 24–26 June
- Host city: Algiers, Algeria
- Events: 39
- Participation: 3 nations

The 1981 Maghreb Athletics Championships was the eighth edition of the international athletics competition between the countries of the Maghreb. Algeria, Tunisia and Libya were the competing nations. Organised by the Union des Fédérations d'Athlétisme du Maghreb Uni (Union of Athletics Federations of the United Maghreb), it took place in Casablanca, Morocco from 15–17 July. A total of 39 athletics events were contested, 23 for men and 16 for women.

The 1981 edition marked a rejuvenation of the tournament, there having been a six-year gap since the last edition. It was the second time that Algiers played host to the championships, and also the second time Libya sent a team. With Morocco absent, the hosts, Algeria, were dominant at the competition, winning a total of 29 gold medals. Tunisia had nine gold medals, and Libya took the sole remaining gold medal.

The women's heptathlon was introduced, replacing the women's pentathlon in line with the new international standard set at the 1983 World Championships in Athletics. A women's 400 metres hurdles and Maghreb men's marathon were also staged for the first time. Track events were only officially timed to the tenth of a second.

== Medal summary ==
=== Men ===
Event	Gold		Silver		Bronze	
100 metres	Brahim Badi (ALG)	10.6	Abdeslam Kaddouri (ALG)	10.7	Messaoud Fguiri (TUN)	10.8
200 metres	Brahim Amour (ALG)	21.3	Brahim Badi (ALG)	21.5	Ahmed Abdul Ali (LBA)	21.6
400 metres	Mohamed Aïssaoui (ALG)	47.4	Bachir Fellah (LBA)	47.9	Saïd Oukali (ALG)	48.2
800 metres	Saïd Ouakli (ALG)	1:51.2	Amar Brahmia (ALG)	1:51.7	Mohamed Alouini (TUN)	1:52.3
1500 metres	Mehdi Aidet (ALG)	3:40.9	Mohamed Néji Henchiri (TUN)	3:42.0	Abderrahmane Morceli (ALG)	3:42.3
5000 metres	Rachid Habchaoui (ALG)	13:58.1	Lahcene Babaci (ALG)	14:00.9	Rabah Zaïdi (TUN)	14:26.1
10,000 metres	Rachid Habchaoui (ALG)	28:52.3	Abdelmadjid Mada (ALG)	29:21.9	Faisal Touzri (TUN)	29:36.0
110 m hurdles	Riad Benhaddad (ALG)	14.3	Mohamed Bensaad (ALG)	14.8	Tawfik Zaouali (TUN)	14.8
400 m hurdles	Lahcene Belhadjoudja (ALG)	53.1	Laouari Benmaghnia (ALG)	53.6	Khalifa Khémiri (TUN)	53.6
3000 metres steeplechase	Lahcene Babaci (ALG)	8:29.7	Féthi Baccouche (TUN)	8:49.2	Habib Romdhani (TUN)	8:53.9
4×100 m relay	Algeria (ALG)	42.3	Tunisia (TUN)	42.9	Libya (LBA)	43.2
4×400 m relay	Algeria (ALG)	3:14.0	Tunisia (TUN)	3:17.4	Libya (LBA)	3:19.4
Marathon	Houcine El Mekni (TUN)	2:36:29	Lazreg Lakhal (ALG)	2:39:03	Abdelaziz Bouguerra (TUN)	2:52:19
20,000 m walk	Benamar Kachkouche (ALG)	1:30:09.2	Abdelwahab Ferguène (ALG)	1:34:07.4	Abdelkrim Dridi (TUN)	1:52:18.5
High jump	Abdenour Krim (ALG)	2.10 m	Mustapha Tarzali (ALG)	1.95 m	Nasreddine Zaouali (TUN)	1.95 m
Pole vault	Mohamed Bensaad (ALG)	4.60 m	Djamel Bouzerar (ALG)	4.50 m	Abdelatif Chekir (TUN)	4.30 m
Long jump	Mohamed Abdusalam Bishti (LBA)	7.71 m	Bachir Messikh (ALG)	7.55 m	Ahmed Benazoug (ALG)	7.23 m
Triple jump	Saïd Saad (ALG)	15.78 m	Abdelatif Fezzani (TUN)	15.71 m	Ali Ajmi (TUN)	14.76 m
Shot put	Abderrazak Ben Hassine (TUN)	15.70 m	Abdullah Djahour (LBA)	14.73 m	Milad Ahmed Hassan (LBA)	14.72 m
Discus throw	Abderrazak Ben Hassine (TUN)	56.32 m	Mourad Boubnider (ALG)	44.36 m	Milad Ahmed Hassan (LBA)	44.34 m
Hammer throw	Hakim Toumi (ALG)	60.74 m	Youssef Ben Abid (TUN)	56.60 m	Abdellah Boubekeur (ALG)	55.82 m
Javelin throw	Tarek Chaabani (TUN)	68.94 m	Ali Memmi (TUN)	66.58 m	Allel Boulmahli (ALG)	64.54 m
Decathlon	Mohamed Bensaad (ALG)	7230 pts	Abdessatar Mouelhi (TUN)	7094 pts	Fillali Hadj Brahim (ALG)	6167 pts

=== Women ===
Event	Gold		Silver		Bronze	
100 metres	Fatima Mefti (ALG)	12.3	Leïla Belhaouane (TUN)	12.7	Malika Hammouche (ALG)	12.7
200 metres	Fatima Mefti (ALG)	25.6	Malika Hammouche (ALG)	25.7	Leïla Belhaouane (TUN)	25.8
400 metres	Dalila Baouche (ALG)	57.4	Sarra Touibi (TUN)	57.7	Mebarka Hadj Abdellah (ALG)	59.1
800 metres	Dalila Baouche (ALG)	2:14.1	Mebarka Hadj Abdellah (ALG)	2:15.3	Rachida Oueslati (TUN)	2:16.5
1500 metres	Rachida Oueslati (TUN)	4:29.7	Dalila Méhira (ALG)	4:31.9	Latifa Dérouiche (TUN)	4:34.2
3000 metres	Dalila Méhira (ALG)	9:54.7	Latifa Dérouiche (TUN)	10:00.4	Rachida Oueslati (TUN)	10:10.7
100 m hurdles	Zahra Azaiez (TUN)	15.1	Dalila Tayebi (ALG)	15.2	Nacèra Achir (ALG)	15.5
400 m hurdles	Basma Gharbi (TUN)	63.2	Karima Henni (ALG)	64.7	Nacèra Chétaibi (ALG)	65.6
4×100 m relay	Algeria (ALG)	49.3	Tunisia (TUN)	49.3	Only two starting teams	
4×400 m relay	Tunisia (TUN)	3:53.0	Algeria (ALG)	3:55.0	Only two starting teams	
High jump	Nacèra Achir (ALG)	1.63 m	Kawther Akrémi (TUN)	1.63 m	Yamina Bourzama (ALG)	1.60 m
Long jump	Dalila Tayebi (ALG)	6.02 m	Zahra Azaiez (TUN)	5.73 m	Leïla Belhaouane (TUN)	5.48 m
Shot put	Fatiha Larab (ALG)	12.69 m	Saoussen Chaabane (TUN)	11.90 m	Latifa Nefzaoui (TUN)	11.64 m
Discus throw	Fathia Jerbi (TUN)	47.02 m	Djamila Aït Dib (ALG)	41.78 m	Aïcha Dahmous (ALG)	36.64 m
Javelin throw	Samia Djémaa (ALG)	46.16 m	Nouria Kédideh (ALG)	41.14 m	Wissem Chennoufi (TUN)	41.02 m
Heptathlon	Dalila Tayebi (ALG)	5116 pts	Nacèra Achir (ALG)	4761 pts	Zahra Azaiez (TUN)	4715 pts
