= Benhabyles =

Benhabyles or Benhabylès is a surname. Notable people with the surname include:

- Abdelmalek Benhabyles (1921–2018), Algerian politician
- Malika Benhabylès, Algerian runner
