= Abdenouz =

Abdenouz is a surname. Notable people with the surname include:

- El Hachemi Abdenouz (born 1956), Algerian long-distance runner
- Réda Abdenouz (born 1968), Algerian middle-distance runner
