= Abdelwahab Ferguène =

Algerian racewalker

Personal information
- Born: 18 November 1958 (age 67) Akbou, Algeria

Sport
- Sport: Race walking
Medal record
Representing Algeria
All-Africa Games
Silver medal – second place	1991 Cairo	20 km walk
African Championships
Gold medal – first place	1984 Rabat	20 km walk
Gold medal – first place	1985 Cairo	20 km walk
Silver medal – second place	1988 Annaba	20 km walk
Silver medal – second place	1989 Lagos	20 km walk
Silver medal – second place	1990 Cairo	20 km walk

Abdelwahab Ferguène (Arabic: عبد الوهاب فرقان; born 18 November 1958) is an Algerian former racewalking athlete who competed in the 20 kilometres race walk. Born in Akbou, he twice represented Algeria at the Summer Olympics, 26th in 1984 and 32nd in 1988. He was also a three-time participant at the World Championships in Athletics (1983, 1987, 1993) and a four-time representative at the IAAF World Race Walking Cup. He was a two-time winner of the African Championships in Athletics (1984, 1985) and won four continental silver medals. He also finished in the top two at the Maghreb Athletics Championships and Arab Athletics Championships throughout his career.

== Career ==
Ferguène followed in the footsteps of his compatriot Benamar Kachkouche (the first African race walk champion) to lead the continent and the Arab world in the race walk during the 1980s. He took runner-up spots behind Kachkouche at the 1981 Arab Athletics Championships and at the Maghreb Athletics Championships in 1981 and 1983.

Following appearances at the World Championships in 1983 and the 1984 Los Angeles Olympics, he rose to the peak of his region with a win at the 1984 African Championships in Athletics, edging his compatriot Kachkouche by such a narrow margin that they received the same time. This marked the start of his most successful period, as he won four further major titles after this. He retained his title at the 1985 African Championships, besting Shemsu Hassan by nearly nine minutes, and set a games record of 1:32:31 hours to win the 1985 Pan Arab Games that same year. In 1986 he topped the podium at the Maghreb Championships, beating runner-up Mohamed Haddadou by over fifteen minutes. He achieved a championship record of 1:30:39 hours en route to winning the 1987 Arab Athletics Championships.

At the 1987 World Championships in Athletics he placed 35th – the only African in the race. He and Mohamed Bouhalla formed the African contingent at the 1988 Seoul Olympics. Ferguène finished ahead of his countryman and gave his best championship performance with a time of 1:26:33 hours for 32nd place. The younger Bouhalla was fast improving, however, and Ferguène ended up silver medallist behind him at both the 1988 and 1989 African Championships in Athletics. Ethiopia's Shemsu Hassan dipped under an hour and a half to leave Ferguène as runner-up at the 1990 African Championships in Athletics and the 1991 All-Africa Games.

His last title came at the 1992 Pan Arab Games. He also set a career best that year, with 1:22:51 hours at a race in Hildesheim, Germany. After seventh at the 1991 Mediterranean Games, he made his final high-profile appearance for Algeria at the 1993 World Championships in Athletics, coming in a career high of 34th and two places behind Hatem Ghoula, who would later become Africa's first world medallist in the sport.

Ferguène won at least six national titles in racewalking during his career. He remains the African record holder for the 50,000 m track walk, as well as the Algerian record holder in the 20 km road walk, 5000 m track walk and 30,000 m track walk disciplines.

He and Samia Djemaa (a javelin thrower for Algeria) had a daughter, Amina Ferguène, who herself took up athletics and represented Algeria in the hurdles.

== International competitions ==
Year	Competition	Venue	Position	Event	Notes
1981	Maghreb Championships	Algiers, Algeria	2nd	20,000 m walk	1:34:07.4
1981	Arab Championships	Tunis, Tunisia	2nd	20 km walk	1:41:40
1983	Maghreb Championships	Casablanca, Morocco	2nd	20,000 m walk	1:32:38.1
1983	World Championships	Helsinki, Finland	35th	20 km walk	1:29:53
1984	Olympic Games	Los Angeles, United States	26th	20 km walk	1:31:24
1984	African Championships	Rabat, Morocco	1st	20 km walk	1:30:02
1985	World Race Walking Cup	St John's, Isle of Man	37th	20 km walk	1:32:51
1985	African Championships	Cairo, Egypt	1st	20 km walk	1:33:28
1985	Pan Arab Games	Casablanca, Morocco	1st	20 km walk	1:32:31
1985	Universiade	Kobe, Japan	21st	20 km walk	1:41:44
1986	Maghreb Championships	Tunis, Tunisia	1st	20 km walk	1:36:19
1987	World Race Walking Cup	New York City, United States	40th	20 km walk	1:26:17
1987	Arab Championships	Algiers, Algeria	1st	20 km walk	1:30:39
1987	World Championships	Rome, Italy	35th	20 km walk	1:34:26
1988	African Championships	Annaba, Algeria	2nd	20 km walk	1:34:07
1988	Olympic Games	Seoul, South Korea	32nd	20 km walk	1:26:33
1989	World Race Walking Cup	Barcelona, Spain	34th	20 km walk	1:26:04
1989	African Championships	Lagos, Nigeria	2nd	20 km walk	1:36:49
1989	Arab Championships	Cairo, Egypt	2nd	20 km walk	1:51:52
1990	African Championships	Cairo, Egypt	2nd	20 km walk	1:31:00
1991	World Race Walking Cup	San Jose, United States	62nd	20 km walk	1:29:51
1991	Mediterranean Games	Athens, Greece	7th	20 km walk	1:33:27
1991	All-Africa Games	Cairo, Egypt	2nd	20 km walk	1:35:21
1992	Pan Arab Games	Latakia, Syria	1st	20 km walk	1:32:31
1993	World Championships	Stuttgart, Germany	34th	20 km walk	1:35:48

== National titles ==
- Algerian Athletics Championships
  - 10,000 m walk: 1992, 1993
  - 20 km walk: 1985, 1988, 1989, 1990

== See also ==
- List of champions of the African Championships in Athletics
