= Rashid Al-Jirbi =

Emirati sprinter

Personal information
- Nationality: Emirati
- Born: Rashid Ismail Al-Jirbi; 1961 (age 64–65)
- Height: 171 cm (5 ft 7 in)
- Weight: 64 kg (141 lb)

Sport
- Sport: Sprinting
- Events: 100 metres 200 metres 400 metres
Medal record
Men's athletics
Representing United Arab Emirates
Arab Championships
Silver medal – second place	1981 Tunis	100 m hurdles
Silver medal – second place	1981 Tunis	200 m hurdles

Rashid Ismail Al-Jirbi (راشد اسماعيل الجربي) (born 1961) is an Emirati former sprinter.

At the 1981 Arab Athletics Championships in Tunis he won the silver medal in the 100 metres and the silver medal in the 100 metres.

He competed in the men's 400 metres at the 1984 Summer Olympics.
