= Hassan Chahine =

Moroccan hammer thrower

Sport
- Country: Morocco
- Sport: Athletics
- Event: Hammer throw
Medal record
Men's athletics
Representing Morocco
African Championships
Silver medal – second place	1989 Lagos	Hammer throw
Silver medal – second place	1990 Cairo	Hammer throw

Hassan Chahine is a retired Moroccan hammer thrower.

He won the bronze medal at the 1983 Maghreb Championships finished fourth at the 1989 Jeux de la Francophonie, won the silver medal at the 1989 African Championships, the silver medal at the 1990 African Championships and the bronze medal at the 1990 Maghreb Championships.

His personal best throw was 67.30 metres, achieved in October 1989 in Cairo. This was the Moroccan record until 2013.
