= Ahmed Belkessam =

Algerian middle-distance runner

Personal information
- Born: 27 March 1962 (age 64)
- Height: 1.75 m (5 ft 9 in)
- Weight: 72 kg (159 lb)

Sport
- Sport: Athletics
- Event: 800 m
Medal record
Men's athletics
Representing Algeria
African Championships
Bronze medal – third place	1988 Annaba	800 m

Ahmed Belkessam (Arabic: أحمد بلقسام; born 27 March 1962) is a retired Algerian middle-distance runner who specialized in the 800 meters. He represented his country at the 1984 and 1988 Summer Olympics as well as one indoor and one outdoor World Championships. In addition, he won several medals on regional level.

== Competition record ==
Year	Competition	Venue	Position	Event	Notes
Representing Algeria
1984	Olympic Games	Los Angeles, United States	28th (h)	800 m	1:48.11
1985	Universiade	Kobe, Japan	25th (h)	800 m	1:51.21
1986	Goodwill Games	Moscow, Soviet Union	8th	800 m	1:47.86
1986	Maghreb Championships	Tunis, Tunisia	2nd	800 m	1:52.93
1988	African Championships	Annaba, Algeria	3rd	800 m	1:47.49
1988	Olympic Games	Seoul, South Korea	20th (qf)	800 m	1:46.93
1989	Arab Championships	Cairo, Egypt	1st	800 m	1:52.8
1990	Maghreb Championships	Algiers, Algeria	2nd	800 m	1:49.91
1991	World Indoor Championships	Seville, Spain	10th (sf)	800 m	1:50.18
1991	World Championships	Tokyo, Japan	15th (h)	800 m	1:47.06

== Personal bests ==
Outdoor

- 800 metres – 1:45.43 (Bologna 1990)
- 1000 metres – 2:18.25 (Villeneuve-d'Ascq 1993)
- 1500 metres – 3:45.36 (Monaco 1994)

Indoor

- 800 metres – 1:47.80 (Ancona 1987)
- 1000 metres – 2:21.21 (The Hague 1991)
