= Mohamed Zahafi =

Moroccan middle-distance runner

Mohamed Zahafi (born 1959) is a Moroccan middle distance runner who specialized in the 800 metres.

In 1983 he won bronze medals in both 800 and 1500 metres at the Maghreb Championships. Both races were won by Saïd Aouita. In the same year Zahafi competed at the 1983 World Championships, but without reaching the final. He also finished fifth in the 1500 metres at the 1983 Mediterranean Games.

He became Moroccan champion in the 800 metres in 1981, 1982 and 1983, and in the 1500 metres in 1983.

His personal best time was 1.46.38 minutes, achieved in June 1983 in Lausanne.
