= Othmane Belfaa =

Algerian high jumper (born 1961)

Personal information
- Born: 18 October 1961 (age 64) Lille, France

Sport
- Sport: Track and field
Medal record
Representing Algeria
World Indoor Championships
Bronze medal – third place	1985 Paris	High jump
African Championships
Gold medal – first place	1979 Dakar	High jump
Gold medal – first place	1989 Lagos	High jump
Gold medal – first place	1990 Cairo	High jump
Silver medal – second place	1992 Belle Vue Harel	High jump
Mediterranean Games
Gold medal – first place	1983 Casablanca	High jump
Gold medal – first place	1991 Athens	High jump
Bronze medal – third place	1987 Latakia	High jump

Othmane Mustapha Belfaa (Arabic: عثمان بلفاع; born 18 October 1961) is a retired Algerian athlete who competed in the high jump. He was born in Lille, France. His personal best is 2.28m (it was a national record at that time) achieved in Amman in 1983. He finished 3rd at the 1985 IAAF World Indoor Championships in Athletics in Paris with a jump of 2.27m. He finished also 6th at the 1992 World Cup in Athletics in Havana.

== International competitions ==
Year	Competition	Venue	Position	Event	Notes
Representing Algeria
1979	African Championships	Dakar, Senegal	1st	High jump	2.15 m
1987	All-Africa Games	Nairobi, Kenya	1st	High jump	2.19 m

- 1992 Pan Arab Games - gold medal
- 1992 African Championships - gold medal
- 1991 All-Africa Games - gold medal
- 1991 Mediterranean Games - gold medal
- 1990 African Championships - gold medal
- 1990 Maghreb Athletics Championships - gold medal
- 1989 African Championships - gold medal
- 1989 Arab Athletics Championships - gold medal
- 1987 Mediterranean Games - bronze medal
- 1987 Arab Athletics Championships - gold medal
- 1985 IAAF World Indoor Championships - bronze medal
- 1983 Mediterranean Games - gold medal
- 1983 Arab Athletics Championships - gold medal
- 1983 Maghreb Athletics Championships - gold medal
