= Ahmed Mahour Bacha =

Algerian athlete (born 1961)

Personal information
- Born: 16 June 1961 (age 65)

Sport
- Sport: Track and field
Medal record
Representing Algeria
African Championships
Gold medal – first place	1984 Rabat	Decathlon
Gold medal – first place	1985 Cairo	Javelin throw
Gold medal – first place	1985 Cairo	Decathlon
Gold medal – first place	1989 Lagos	Decathlon
Gold medal – first place	1992 Belle Vue Harel	Decathlon
Silver medal – second place	1985 Cairo	Pole vault
Silver medal – second place	1988 Annaba	Pole vault
Bronze medal – third place	1984 Rabat	Javelin throw
Bronze medal – third place	1990 Cairo	Decathlon

Ahmed Mahour Bacha (born 16 June 1961) is an Algerian former track and field athlete who competed in the decathlon and javelin throw. Bacha was among the foremost African and Arab decathletes in the 1980s and early 1990s. His brother, Mourad Mahour Bacha, was also a notable decathlete and field event athlete.

He won 14 national titles in his career across decathlon and various field events, including six javelin titles. He was the African champion in the javelin throw in 1985. He was also the decathlon gold medallist at the All-Africa Games in 1987. He was a double gold medallist at the 1985 Pan Arab Games, topping both the decathlon and javelin podiums.

Bacha made one appearance at the global level, at the 1983 World Championships in Athletics. He failed to record a valid mark in the shot put event and opted not to finish the competition.

He set a lifetime best of 7934 points for the decathlon on 9 July 1985 in Algiers. His javelin throw best with the new model was 70.20 m (230 ft 3 3/4 in), which brought him a silver medal at the 1986 Maghreb Athletics Championships and remains the Algerian record for the event.

== International competitions ==
Year	Competition	Venue	Position	Event	Notes
1981	Arab Championships	Tunis, Tunisia	1st	Decathlon	7495 pts
1983	Arab Championships	Amman, Jordan	1st	Decathlon	6893 pts
1983	Maghreb Championships	Casablanca, Morocco	3rd	Decathlon	6708 pts
1983	World Championships	Helsinki, Finland	—	Decathlon	DNF
1984	African Championships	Rabat, Morocco	3rd	Javelin throw	71.86 m
1984	African Championships	Rabat, Morocco	1st	Decathlon	7022 pts
1985	African Championships	Cairo, Egypt	2nd	Pole vault	4.50 m
1985	African Championships	Cairo, Egypt	1st	Decathlon	6712 pts
1985	African Championships	Cairo, Egypt	1st	Javelin throw	80.04 m
1985	Pan Arab Games	Casablanca, Morocco	1st	Decathlon	7577 pts
1985	Pan Arab Games	Casablanca, Morocco	1st	Javelin throw	76.88 m
1986	Maghreb Championships	Tunis, Tunisia	3rd	Shot put	14.06 m
1986	Maghreb Championships	Tunis, Tunisia	2nd	Javelin throw	70.20 m
1987	Arab Championships	Algiers, Algeria	1st	Decathlon	7372 pts
1987	All-Africa Games	Nairobi, Kenya	1st	Decathlon	7104 pts
1988	African Championships	Annaba, Algeria	2nd	Decathlon	7128 pts
1990	Maghreb Championships	Algiers, Algeria	2nd	Decathlon	7026 pts
1990	African Championships	Cairo, Egypt	3rd	Decathlon	6802 pts
1991	All-Africa Games	Cairo, Egypt	1st	Decathlon	7431 pts
1992	African Championships	Belle Vue Mauricia, Mauritius	1st	Decathlon	7467 pts

== National titles ==
- Algerian Athletics Championships
  - Pole vault: 1982, 1985
  - Shot put: 1983, 1984, 1985, 1986
  - Discus throw: 1985
  - Javelin throw: 1983, 1984, 1985, 1986, 1987, 1988
  - Decathlon: 1982
