= Allaoua Khellil =

Algerian long-distance runner

Medal record

Men's athletics

Representing Algeria

African Championships
Silver medal – second place	1988 Annaba	Marathon

Allaoua Khelil (born July 24, 1954) is a male former long-distance runner from Algeria, who represented his native North African country at the 1988 Summer Olympics in Seoul, South Korea. He won the 1987 edition of the Reims Marathon, clocking a total time of 2:16:39 on October 18, 1987.

== Achievements ==
Year	Competition	Venue	Position	Event	Notes
Representing Algeria
1987	Reims Marathon	Reims, France	1st	Marathon	2:16:39
1988	Olympic Games	Seoul, South Korea	35th	Marathon	2:21:12
