= Rachida Ferdjaoui =

Algerian sprinter and hurdler

Medal record

Women's athletics

Representing Algeria

African Championships
Silver medal – second place	1984 Rabat	400 m hurdles

Rachida Ferdjaoui (born 1965) is a retired Algerian sprinter and hurdler who saw success on continental level.

At the Arab Athletics Championships she won three gold medals; the 100 and 200 metres in 1983 and only the 200 metres in 1987. At the 1983 Maghreb Championships she won silver in the 200 and bronze in the 400 metres hurdles, going on to win the 400 metres hurdles at the 1986 Maghreb Championships. She also won the silver medal in hurdles at the 1984 African Championships, albeit with only two finishers. She also finished eighth in the 800 metres at the 1983 Mediterranean Games.

She became Algerian champion eight times between 1983 and 1988, in the 100, 200, 400 metres and 400 metres hurdles.
