= Maghreb Athletics Championships =

Defunct athletics competition

The Maghreb Athletics Championships was an international athletics competition between athletes from countries of the Maghreb. The event was hosted eleven times during its existence from the late 1960s to 1990.

Organised by the Union des Fédérations d'Athlétisme du Maghreb Uni (UFAMU), the competition was first held in 1967. It was an annual competition until 1971, at which point it changed to a biennial format. The event schedule was disrupted after 1975, with the final four editions being held in 1981, 1983, 1986 and 1990. The competing nations were principally Algeria, Morocco and Tunisia, although Libya was present for a handful of editions (1969, 1981, and 1983).

After the discontinuation of the championships after 1990, the North African Athletics Championships was created in 2003, featuring all four participating nations from the Maghreb Championships. This ran for only two years. The disruption of these events reflected growing political disputes between the countries within the Arab Maghreb Union, particularly over sovereignty of the Western Sahara.

The UFAMU was founded in 1966 and held the inaugural Maghreb Cross Country Championships that same year. It was the first attempt to organise the sport of athletics at that regional level. Since the dissolution of the UFAMU, the four constituent countries continue to compete in the broader Arab Athletics Championships tournament.

The Maghreb Athletics Championships was roughly contemporaneous with the Maghreb Champions Cup and Maghreb Cup Winners Cup, two annual football competitions between the top Algerian, Moroccan and Tunisian association football clubs. These were also short-lived running from 1970 to 1976. Among other sporting events for the region, the Maghreb Student Cross Country Championships reached its 32nd edition in 2013, and a Maghreb Judo Youth Championships had its eighth event in 2009. The presidents of the Algerian and Tunisian National Olympic Committees proposed a Maghreb Olympics in 2013, representing increasing interest in sporting competition at the region level.

== Editions ==
Ed.	Year	City	Country	Dates	No. of events	No. of nations	No. of athletes
1st	1967	Rabat	Morocco	15–16 July	33	3	
2nd	1968	Algiers	Algeria	20–21 July	33	3	
3rd	1969	Tripoli	Libya	24–25 July	33	4	
4th	1970	Tunis	Tunisia	~31 July	33	3	
5th	1971	Casablanca	Morocco	~27 February	36	3	
6th	1973	Agadir	Morocco	27–29 July	36	3	
7th	1975	Tunis	Tunisia		37	3	
8th	1981	Algiers	Algeria	24–26 June	39	3	
9th	1983	Casablanca	Morocco	15–17 July	39	4	
10th	1986	Tunis	Tunisia	7–9 August	39	3	
11th	1990	Algiers	Algeria	~27 July	40	3	

== Participating nations ==
- Algeria
- Morocco (except 1981)
- Tunisia
- /Libya (1969, 1981, and 1983)
