= Derradji Harek =

Algerian athletics competitor

Derradji Harek (born 19 December 1959) represented Algeria in the 800m and the 1500mat the 1980 Summer Olympic Games, he qualified for the semi-final in the 800m where he finished 8th.
