= Sakina Boutamine =

Algerian runner (born 1953)

Personal information
- Nationality: Algerian
- Born: 2 June 1953 (age 73)

Sport
- Sport: Track and field
- Events: 1500 m, 3000 m

Achievements and titles
- Personal best: 1500 m: 4:10.60 (1979)
Medal record
Women's athletics
Representing Algeria
All-Africa Games
Gold medal – first place	1987 Algiers	1500 m
Silver medal – second place	1978 Algiers	800 m
African Championships
Gold medal – first place	1979 Dakar	1500 m
Gold medal – first place	1979 Dakar	3000 m
Mediterranean Games
Bronze medal – third place	1979 Split	1500 m

Sakina Boutamine (born 2 June 1953) is a retired Algerian female middle-distance runner who specialised in 1500 metres and 3000 metres. She won gold medals in both events in the inaugural 1979 African Championships in Dakar.

== International competitions ==
Year	Competition	Venue	Position	Event	Notes
Representing Algeria
1978	All-Africa Games	Algiers, Algeria	2nd	800 m	2:05.64
1978	All-Africa Games	Algiers, Algeria	1st	1500 m	4:16.43
1979	African Championships	Dakar, Senegal	1st	1500 m	4:23.6 (a)
1979	African Championships	Dakar, Senegal	1st	3000 m	9:31.1 (a)
1979	Mediterranean Games	Split, Yugoslavia	3rd	1500 m	4:10.60
Representing Africa
1977	IAAF World Cup	Düsseldorf, West Germany	6th	1500 m	4.18.5
1979	IAAF World Cup	Montreal, Canada	4th	1500 m	4.12.13
1979	IAAF World Cup	Montreal, Canada	7th	3000 m	9.30.73
