= Azzedine Sakhri =

Algerian long-distance runner

Personal information
- Born: 22 January 1968 (age 58) Algiers, Algeria

Sport
- Sport: Marathon running
Medal record
Representing Algeria
Mediterranean Games
Gold medal – first place	1997 Bari	Marathon

Azzedine Sakhri (born 22 January 1968) is a retired Algerian long-distance runner who specialized in the marathon race.

He won the gold medal at the 1997 Mediterranean Games, finished eighth at the 1997 World Championships and fifth at the 2001 Mediterranean Games.

He also competed at the 1999 World Championships as well as the World Cross Country Championships in 1997, 1998, 1999 and 2002 without further success.

== Achievements ==
Year	Competition	Venue	Position	Event	Notes
Representing Algeria
1997	Mediterranean Games	Bari, Italy	1st	Marathon	2:20:40
1997	World Championships	Athens, Greece	8th	Marathon	2:17:44
1998	Florence Marathon	Florence, Italy	1st	Marathon	2:16:39
1999	World Championships	Seville, Spain	33rd	Marathon	2:23:39
2001	Mediterranean Games	Radès, Tunisia	5th	Marathon	2:24:58
2001	World Championships	Edmonton, Canada	—	Marathon	DNF

== Personal bests ==
- 5000 metres - 13:39.83 min (1993)
- 10,000 metres - 28:28.11 min (1994)
- Half marathon - 1:02:51 hrs
- Marathon - 2:13:57 hrs (1996)
