= Samir Moussaoui =

Algerian long-distance runner

Samir Moussaoui (born 15 May 1975 in Bordj Bou-Azzéridj) is an Algerian long-distance runner who specializes in the 5000 and 10,000 metres.

He has reached two Olympic finals, finishing 16th in 10,000 metres at the 2000 Summer Olympics and 14th in 5000 metres at the 2004 Summer Olympics. He also won a bronze medal in 5000 m at the 2005 Islamic Solidarity Games.

His personal best times are 13:18.99 minutes and 28:01.34 minutes on the two distances.

Time Table Profile
DATE	PLACE	PERFORMANCE	specialty
05 SEP 2004	Rieti	7:44.43	3000 Metres
31 JUL 2004	Heusden-Zolder	13:18.99	5000 Metres
30 JUL 1999	Stockholm	28:01.34	10,000 Metres
