= Nasria Baghdad-Azaïdj =

Algerian long-distance runner

Personal information
- Nationality: Algerian
- Born: 29 October 1971 (age 55)

Sport
- Sport: Long-distance running
- Event: Marathon

Nasria Baghdad-Azaïdj (born 29 October 1971) is an Algerian long-distance runner. She competed in the women's marathon at the 2004 Summer Olympics in which she did not finish the race.
