= Mohamed Kacemi =

Algerian middle-distance runner (born 1948)

Personal information
- Born: 22 December 1948 (age 77) Oum Drou, Algeria

Sport
- Sport: Track and field

Mohamed Kacemi (born 22 December 1948) represented Algeria in the 1500 m at the 1972 Summer Olympics. He finished 8th in his heat and failed to advance.
