= Kamel Kohil =

Algerian long-distance runner (born 1971)

Personal information
- Nationality: Algerian
- Born: 25 December 1971 (age 54)

Sport
- Sport: Long-distance running
- Event: Marathon
Medal record
Men's athletics
Representing Algeria
African Championships
Bronze medal – third place	2000 Algiers	10,000 m

Kamel Kohil (born 25 December 1971) is an Algerian long-distance runner. He competed in the men's marathon at the 2000 Summer Olympics.
