= Kenza Dahmani =

Algerian long-distance runner

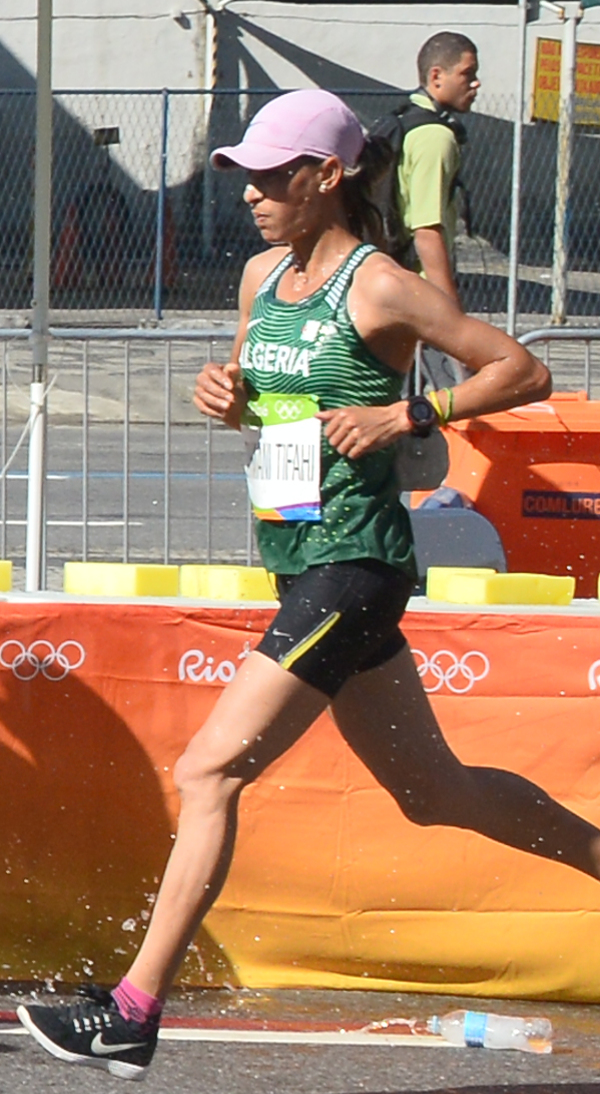
- Dahmani at the 2016 Olympics

Personal information
- Born: 18 November 1980 (age 45) Algeria
- Height: 164 cm (5 ft 5 in)
- Weight: 54 kg (119 lb)

Sport
- Sport: Athletics
- Events: 5000, 10,000 m, half marathon, marathon
- Club: NC Bordj Bou Arreridj

Achievements and titles
- Personal bests: 5000 m – 16:21.53 (2007); 10,000 m – 32:42.47 (2013); HM – 1:12:17 (2011); Marathon – 2:33:53 (2016)
Medal record
Representing Algeria
Mediterranean Games
Gold medal – first place	2013 Mersin	10,000 m
Silver medal – second place	2009 Pescara	10,000 m
Bronze medal – third place	2009 Pescara	Half marathon
All-Africa Games
Bronze medal – third place	2007 Algiers	Half marathon
Pan Arab Games
Silver medal – second place	2007 Cairo	Half marathon

Kenza Dahmani Tifahi (born 18 November 1980) is an Algerian long-distance runner who competes in track, road and cross country events. She is a six-time participant at the IAAF World Cross Country Championships.

At the Mediterranean Games she won two bronze medals in 2009 before taking the 10,000 metres title in 2013. She has also won medals at the All-Africa Games, Pan Arab Games and Arab Athletics Championships.

== Career ==
Dahmani's first international outings came through the IAAF World Cross Country Championships. Running as a junior, she came 58th in 1997, 55th in 1998, and 43rd in 1999. Once she had grown into the senior ranks she did not compete at a high level until 2007. That year she won the Algerian cross country title and was runner-up at the national half marathon championships. Her half marathon performance led to her first senior international selections: she was runner-up at the Arab Athletics Championships, the bronze medallist at the 2007 All-Africa Games, and the silver medallist at the 2007 Pan Arab Games.

She represented Algeria at the 2008 and 2009 IAAF World Cross Country Championships, placing 59th and 32nd respectively. She set a personal best in the marathon with a run of 2:39:38 hours for third at the Madrid Marathon. The 2009 Mediterranean Games provided her with more regional medals, as she claimed the bronze in both the 10,000 metres and the half marathon events. She was the Arab Half Marathon champion and also won at the Marathon de Toulouse Métropole. She competed sparingly in 2010 to 2012, with her foremost result being fourth place at the Arab Half Marathon Championships.

The 2013 season saw Dahmani reach new peaks. She placed 18th at the 2013 IAAF World Cross Country Championships and she won the 10,000 m title at the Mediterranean Games with a personal best of 32:42.47 minutes. Over the half marathon distance she was the runner-up in the Arab Championships but failed to finish at the Mediterranean Games.

Dahmani has two children. She stopped competing in 2013–2015 and returned to training in October 2015. She placed 50th in the 2016 Olympic marathon.
