= Mébarka Hadj Abdellah =

Algerian runner

Mébarka Hadj Abdellah is a retired Algerian runner who saw success on continental level.

At the 1981 Maghreb Championships she won bronze in the 400 metres and silver in the 800 metres. At the 1986 Maghreb Championships she won gold in the 1500 and 3000 metres. At the 1990 Maghreb Championships she won silver in the 1500 and 3000 metres. At the 1987 Arab Championships she won the 1500 metres gold and the 800 metres silver, and at the 1989 Arab Championships she won the 3000 metres silver, the 1500 and 10,000 metres bronze medals.

At the IAAF World Cross Country Championships she competed in 1980, 1982, 1983, 1985, 1986 and 1990. Her highest finish was a 37th place from 1985.

She became Algerian champion sixteen times between 1984 and 1991, in the 800, 1500, 3000 metres and cross-country.
