= Malika Benhabylès =

Algerian long-distance runner

Medal record

Women's athletics

Representing Algeria

African Championships
Bronze medal – third place	1988 Annaba	10,000 m

Malika Benhabylès is a retired Algerian runner. She won the bronze medal in the 3000 metres at the 1987 Arab Championships and in the 10,000 metres at the 1988 African Championships. She became Algerian champion in both events.
