= Yacine Mousli =

Algerian high jumper

Personal information
- Nationality: Algerian
- Born: 25 May 1967 (age 59)

Sport
- Sport: Athletics
- Event: High jump
Medal record
Men's athletics
Representing Algeria
African Championships
Gold medal – first place	1992 Belle Vue Harel	High jump

Yacine Mousli (born 25 May 1967) is an Algerian athlete. He competed in the men's high jump at the 1992 Summer Olympics.
