= Lotfi Khaïda =

Algerian athlete (born 1968)

Personal information
- Born: 20 December 1968 (age 57)

Sport
- Sport: Track and field
Medal record
Representing Algeria
Mediterranean Games
Bronze medal – third place	1991 Athens	Triple jump
Bronze medal – third place	1993 Languedoc	Triple jump
African Championships
Silver medal – second place	1988 Annaba	Triple jump
Bronze medal – third place	1988 Annaba	Long jump

Lotfi Khaïda (Arabic: لطفي خيدا, born 20 December 1968) is a retired Algerian long jumper and triple jumper.

Khaida competed for the LSU Tigers track and field team in the NCAA.

At the 1988 African Championships he won the triple jump silver medal and the long jump bronze medal. He won bronze medals in the triple jump at the 1991 and 1993 Mediterranean Games, and won the long jump at the 1992 Pan Arab Games.

He competed in both long and triple jump at the 1988 Olympic Games, and in triple jump at the 1992 Olympic Games without reaching the final. He also doubled in both long and triple jump at the 1991 and 1993 World Championships without reaching the final.

He became Algerian long jump champion in 1998, 1989, 1991 and 1994; and triple jump champion in 1987, 1988, 1989, 1991, 1993, 1994 and 1995.

His personal best in the long jump event is 8.05 metres, achieved on 31 July 1994 in Sestriere setting a new Algerian record until broken by Issam Nima in Helsinki on 12 August 2005 with a jump of 8.13 meters. His personal best triple jump is 16.92 metres, achieved in August 1993 in Monaco. The latter was the Algerian record until broken by Yasser Triki in Wuhan on 26 October 2019 with a jump of 17.02 meters being the first Algerian to exceed the 17 meters mark.

Kaida was also holding the Algerian indoor record in the triple jump set in Indianapolis since March 1992 with 16.49 meters before this is broken by Yasser Triki on 25 January 2019 in Texas with a jump of 16.52.
