= Dalila Méhira =

Algerian runner

Dalila Méhira is a retired Algerian runner who saw success on continental level.

At the 1981 Maghreb Championships she won silver in the 1500 metres and gold in the 3000 metres; likewise in 1983. At the 1986 edition she won silver in both events, and in 1990 she won silver in the 10,000 metres. She later won the half marathon at the 1997 Pan Arab Games.

She became Algerian champion several times on distances ranging from the 800 metres to the marathon; championship results are incomplete. At the IAAF World Cross Country Championships she competed in 1982 and 1983. Her highest finish was a 77th place from 1982.
