= Mustapha Kamel Selmi =

Algerian sprinter (born 1965)

Medal record

Men's athletics

Representing Algeria

African Championships
Bronze medal – third place	1985 Cairo	4×100 m
Bronze medal – third place	1988 Annaba	200 m

Mustapha Kamel Selmi (born 3 July 1965) is a retired Algerian sprinter who specialized in the 100 and 200 metres.

He was born in El-Oued, and represented the club MPA. At the 1987 World Championships he reached the quarter-final of both the 100 metres and the 200 metres. At the 1988 Olympic Games he reached the quarter-final of the 200 metres, but not the 100 metres.

At the 1987 Mediterranean Games he won the 100 metres bronze medal and the 200 metres silver. He won the 200 metres bronze at the 1988 African Championships, and he won two gold medals at the 1986 Maghreb Championships.

His personal best times were 10.34 seconds in the 100 metres and 20.91 seconds in the 200 metres, both achieved in 1987.
