= Lahcen Babaci =

Algerian middle-distance runner

Personal information
- Nationality: Algerian
- Born: 4 May 1957 (age 69)

Sport
- Sport: Middle-distance running
- Event: Steeplechase
Medal record
Men's athletics
Representing Algeria
African Championships
| Silver medal – second place | 1984 Rabat | 3000 m st. |

Lahcen Babaci (born 4 May 1957) is an Algerian former middle-distance runner. He competed in the men's 3000 metres steeplechase at the 1980 Summer Olympics.
