= Abderrahmane Morceli =

Algerian middle-distance runner

Personal information
- Born: 1 January 1957 (age 69)

Sport
- Sport: Track and field
Medal record
Representing Algeria
African Championships
| Silver medal – second place | 1979 Dakar | 1500 m |
Summer Universiade
| Bronze medal – third place | 1977 Sofia | 1500 m |
Mediterranean Games
| Silver medal – second place | 1979 Split | 800 m |
| Bronze medal – third place | 1979 Split | 1500 m |

Abderrahmane Morceli (Arabic: عبد الرحمان مرسلي; born 1 January 1957) is a retired Algerian middle-distance runner who specialized in the 1500 metres.

He is a brother of Noureddine Morceli. At the 1979 Mediterranean Games he won a bronze medal in the 1500 metres and a silver medal in the 800 metres. He also won the bronze medal at the 1977 Summer Universiade, and the silver medal at the 1979 African Championships. He became Algerian champion in 1978, 1983 and 1985. He competed at the 1980 and 1984 Summer Olympics without reaching the final, and also at the 1983 World Championships.

His personal best time in the 1500 metres was 3:39.77 minutes, achieved in August 1977 in Tunis. He also had 1:45.7 minutes in the 800 metres, achieved in June 1978 in Ostrava; 2:17.4 minutes in the 1000 metres, achieved in August 1978 in Nice; and 3:54.63 minutes in the mile run, achieved in September 1983 in Rome. Abderrahmane now coaches middle distance at Riverside City College in Riverside, CA (the same school his brother attended).

== Achievements ==
| Year | Competition | Venue | Position | Event | Notes |
Representing Algeria
| 1979 | African Championships | Dakar, Senegal | 2nd | 1500 m | 3:40.1 |
