= Boualem Rahoui =

Algerian athlete (born 1948)

Personal information
- Born: 8 October 1948 (age 77) Aïn Témouchent, Algeria
- Height: 180 cm (5 ft 11 in)
- Weight: 70 kg (154 lb)

Sport
- Sport: Athletics
- Events: 10,000 m, 5,000 m, 3000 m steeplechase
- Club: ASPTT Oran

Achievements and titles
- Personal bests: 5000 m – 13:40.2 (1975); 3000 mS – 8:20.2 (1975)
Medal record
Representing Algeria
Mediterranean Games
Gold medal – first place	1975 Algiers	3000 mS
Bronze medal – third place	1975 Algiers	10000 m

Boualem Rahoui (born 8 October 1948 in Aïn Témouchent) is a retired Algerian long-distance runner. He specialized in the 3000 metres steeplechase, 5000 metres and 10,000 metres.

== Career ==
Rahoui represented the club ASPTT Oran. He competed in the steeplechase and the 5000 metres at the 1972 Olympic Games, and the 10,000 metres at the 1983 World Championships. At the 1975 Mediterranean Games he won the steeplechase gold and the 10,000 metres bronze, and he also won three gold medals at the Maghreb Championships.

His personal best times were 8.20.2 minutes in the steeplechase, achieved in 1975; and 13.40.2 minutes in the 5000 metres, achieved in 1975.
