= Yasmina Azzizi-Kettab =

Algerian heptathlete

Medal record

Women's athletics

Representing Algeria

African Championships
Gold medal – first place	1988 Annaba	Javelin throw
Gold medal – first place	1988 Annaba	Heptathlon
Gold medal – first place	1989 Lagos	Heptathlon
Gold medal – first place	2000 Algiers	Heptathlon
Bronze medal – third place	1985 Cairo	Heptathlon
Bronze medal – third place	1988 Annaba	100 m hurdles
Bronze medal – third place	1989 Lagos	High jump
Bronze medal – third place	1989 Lagos	Javelin throw

Yasmina Azzizi-Kettab (born 25 February 1966) is a retired Algerian heptathlete.

== International competitions ==
Year	Competition	Venue	Position	Event	Notes
Representing Algeria
1985	African Championships	Cairo, Egypt	3rd	Heptathlon	
1987	All-Africa Games	Nairobi, Kenya	1st	Heptathlon	
1988	African Championships	Annaba, Algeria	1st	Heptathlon	
1988	African Championships	Annaba, Algeria	3rd	100 m hurdles	
1988	African Championships	Annaba, Algeria	1st	Javelin	
1989	African Championships	Lagos, Nigeria	1st	Heptathlon	
1989	African Championships	Lagos, Nigeria	3rd	High jump	
1989	African Championships	Lagos, Nigeria	3rd	Javelin	
1991	World Championships	Tokyo, Japan	5th	Heptathlon	
2000	African Championships	Algiers, Algeria	1st	Heptathlon	
2000	Olympic Games	Sydney, Australia	17th	Heptathlon	

== Personal bests ==
- 100 metres – 11.69 (1991)
- 200 metres – 23.38 (1992)
- 800 metres – 2:17.17 (1991)
- 100 metres hurdles – 13.02 (1992)
- High jump – 1.79 (1991)
- Long jump – 6.15 (1991)
- Shot put – 16.16 (1995)
- Javelin throw – 46.28 (2000)
- Heptathlon – 6392 (1991)
