= Ali Bakhta =

Algerian sprinter

Personal information
- Nationality: Algerian
- Born: 13 August 1961 (age 64)

Sport
- Sport: Sprinting
- Event: 200 metres
Medal record
Men's athletics
Representing Algeria
African Championships
Bronze medal – third place	1984 Rabat	200 m

Ali Bakhta (born 13 August 1961) is an Algerian sprinter. He competed in the men's 200 metres at the 1984 Summer Olympics.
