= Mehdi Aidet =

Algerian athletics competitor

Medal record

Men's athletics

Representing Algeria

African Championships
Bronze medal – third place	1979 Dakar	800 m
Bronze medal – third place	1979 Dakar	1500 m
Bronze medal – third place	1984 Rabat	1500 m

Mehdi Aidet (born 3 November 1953) represented Algeria in the 800 m and the 1500 mat the 1980 Summer Olympic Games he qualified for the next round in both events before being eliminated, he then went on to compete in the 1500 mat the 1984 Summer Olympic Games.

He was a National Champion three times in the 800m and 5 times in the 1500m, he also represented Algeria at the 1980 IAAF World Cross Country Championships, 1981 IAAF World Cross Country Championships and 1982 IAAF World Cross Country Championships, his best finish was 60th in 1980.
