= Noureddine Tadjine =

Algerian hurdler (born 1963)

Personal information
- Nationality: Algerian
- Born: 10 May 1963 (age 63)

Sport
- Country: Algeria
- Sport: Track and field
- Event: 110 metres hurdles
Medal record
Men's athletics
Representing Algeria
African Championships
Gold medal – first place	1988 Annaba	110 m hurdles
Silver medal – second place	1989 Lagos	110 m hurdles

Noureddine Tadjine (born 10 May 1963) is an Algerian hurdler. He competed in the men's 110 metres hurdles at the 1988 Summer Olympics.

Olympic Games
Preceded by Abdelkrim Bendjemil	Flagbearer for Algeria; 1988 Seoul	Succeeded by Nacera Boukamoum
