= Abderrazak Bounour =

Algerian long-distance runner (born 1957)

Medal record

Men's athletics

Representing Algeria

African Championships
Gold medal – first place	1984 Rabat	5000 m

Abderrazak Bounour (born 11 January 1957), also known as Abdel Razzak Bounour, is a retired Algerian long-distance runner who specialized in the 5000 metres.

Bounour was born in Annaba and represented the club USSN. He reached the semi-final of the 1983 World Championships and the 1984 Olympic Games and won the 5000 metres at the 1984 African Championships and the silver medal in the same event at the 1983 Maghreb Championships.

His personal best times were 7.49.69 minutes in the 3000 metres, achieved in June 1983 in Tampere; 13.25.26 minutes in the 5000 metres, achieved in June 1984 in Florence; and 28.00.73 minutes in the 10,000 metres, achieved in July 1985 in Stockholm.

== International competitions ==
Year	Competition	Venue	Position	Event	Notes
Representing Algeria
1984	African Championships	Rabat, Morocco	1st	5000 m	13:41.94
