= El Hachemi Abdenouz =

Algerian long-distance runner (born 1956)

El Hachemi Abdenouz (born 1 July 1956) is a retired Algerian long-distance runner who specialized in the 5000 metres.

He reached the semi-final at the 1980 Olympic Games, and won the bronze medals at the 1979 Mediterranean Games and the 1983 Maghreb Championships.

His personal best time was 13.40.1 minutes, achieved in 1979.
