= Rachid Habchaoui =

Algerian long-distance runner

Medal record

Men's athletics

Representing Algeria

African Championships
Bronze medal – third place	1979 Dakar	10,000 m

Rachid Habchaoui (born 4 July 1950) is a retired Algerian long-distance runner who specialized in the 5000 metres and the 10,000 metres.

He competed in both the 5000 metres and the 10,000 metres at the 1980 Olympic Games, but failed to reach the final in either event. He won a bronze medal in the 10,000 metres at the 1979 African Championships. Habchaoui also won the 5000 metres silver and the 10,000 metres bronze at the 1979 Mediterranean Games, and the 5000 metres and 10,000 metres gold medals at the 1981 Maghreb Championships.

His personal best times were 7.49.5 minutes in the 3000 metres, achieved in May 1979 in Naples; 13.35.8 minutes in the 5000 metres, achieved in 1979; and 28.24.0 minutes in the 10,000 metres, achieved in 1979.

== Achievements ==
Year	Competition	Venue	Position	Event	Notes
Representing Algeria
1979	African Championships	Dakar, Senegal	3rd	10,000 m	29:28.9
