= Benamar Kachkouche =

Algerian racewalker (born 1951)

Medal record

Men's athletics

Representing Algeria

African Championships
| Gold medal – first place | 1979 Dakar | 10,000 m walk |
| Silver medal – second place | 1984 Rabat | 20 km walk |

Benamar Kachkouche (born 18 April 1951) is an Algerian former racewalker who competed in the 1984 Summer Olympics. He competed at the 1983 World Championships in Athletics and placed 45th in the 20 kilometres walk. He was Africa's first major continental champion in racewalking, taking gold medals at the inaugural races at the 1978 All-Africa Games and the 1979 African Championships in Athletics.
