= Athletics at the 2007 Arab Games – Results =

These are the official results of the athletics competition at the 2007 Pan Arab Games which took place on 21–24 November 2007 in Cairo, Egypt.

== Men's results ==
=== 100 meters ===
Heats – 21 November

Rank	Heat	Name	Nationality	Time	Notes
1	2	Amr Ibrahim Mostafa Seoud	Egypt	10.49	Q
2	2	Khalil Al-Hanahneh	Jordan	10.55	Q
3	2	Al-Waleed Abdulla	Qatar	10.61	q
4	1	Yahya Al-Gahes	Saudi Arabia	10.62	Q
5	3	Aziz Ouhadi	Morocco	10.68	Q
6	1	Khalid Idriss Zougari	Morocco	10.70	Q
7	1	Rashid Said Arnous	Jordan	10.72	q
8	3	Areef Ibrahim	Qatar	10.72	Q
9	2	Moussa Al Housaoui	Saudi Arabia	10.82	
10	2	Yousuf Darwish Awlad Thani	Oman	10.89	
11	2	Mohamed Siraj Tamin	Lebanon	10.90	
11	3	Barakat Al-Harthi	Oman	10.90	
13	1	Silek Tagir El Nour	Sudan	11.02	
14	3	Haykal Moussalem	Lebanon	11.10	
15	1	Mohamed Konaté	Mauritania	11.50	
	3	Ahmed Mohamed Ali	Egypt	DQ	
	1	Chouaib Chelbi	Tunisia	DNS	

Final – 22 November
Wind: +0.7 m/s

Rank	Name	Nationality	Time	Notes
1st place, gold medalist(s)	Amr Ibrahim Mostafa Seoud	Egypt	10.38	NR
2nd place, silver medalist(s)	Yahya Al-Gahes	Saudi Arabia	10.40	
3rd place, bronze medalist(s)	Khalil Al-Hanahneh	Jordan	10.53	
4	Areef Ibrahim	Qatar	10.61	
5	Al-Waleed Abdulla	Qatar	10.62	
6	Khalid Idriss Zougari	Morocco	10.67	
7	Rashid Said Arnous	Jordan	10.78	
8	Aziz Ouhadi	Morocco	10.78	

=== 200 meters ===
Heats – 23 November
Wind:
Heat 1: +1.0 m/s, Heat 2: +1.0 m/s, Heat 3: -1.0 m/s

Rank	Heat	Name	Nationality	Time	Notes
1	2	Amr Ibrahim Mostafa Seoud	Egypt	20.64	Q, NR
2	3	Hamed Al-Bishi	Saudi Arabia	21.16	Q
3	1	Omar Jouma Al-Salfa	United Arab Emirates	21.23	Q
4	2	Nagmeldin Ali Abubakr	Sudan	21.24	Q
5	3	Soleiman Salem Ayed	Egypt	21.34	Q
6	1	Khalil Al-Hanahneh	Jordan	21.39	Q
7	2	Al-Waleed Abdulla	Qatar	21.43	q
8	1	Khalid Idriss Zougari	Morocco	21.47	q
9	3	Aziz Ouhadi	Morocco	21.48	
10	1	Abdullah Al-Sooli	Oman	21.52	
11	2	Adel Jaber Asseri	Saudi Arabia	21.55	
12	3	Mohamed Khouaja	Libya	21.63	
13	3	Chouaib Chelbi	Tunisia	21.74	
14	2	Juma Mubarak Al-Jabri	Oman	21.77	
15	3	Rashid Said Arnous	Jordan	21.80	
16	1	Hamed Suleiman	Qatar	21.86	
17	2	Mohamed Siraj Tamin	Lebanon	22.20	
18	2	Mohamed Attoumani	Comoros	22.84	
19	1	Mohamed Konaté	Mauritania	23.73	

Final – 24 November
Wind:
+2.0 m/s

Rank	Name	Nationality	Time	Notes
1st place, gold medalist(s)	Amr Ibrahim Mostafa Seoud	Egypt	20.69	
2nd place, silver medalist(s)	Khalil Al-Hanahneh	Jordan	20.81	NR
3rd place, bronze medalist(s)	Soleiman Salem Ayed	Egypt	20.92	
4	Omar Jouma Al-Salfa	United Arab Emirates	20.94	NR
5	Nagmeldin Ali Abubakr	Sudan	21.27	
6	Hamed Al-Bishi	Saudi Arabia	21.28	
7	Khalid Idriss Zougari	Morocco	21.43	
8	Al-Waleed Abdulla	Qatar	21.51	

=== 400 meters ===
Heats – 21 November

Rank	Heat	Name	Nationality	Time	Notes
1	2	Nagmeldin Ali Abubakr	Sudan	46.80	Q
2	2	Ismail Al-Sabani	Saudi Arabia	46.99	Q
3	1	Ridha Ghali	Tunisia	47.36	Q
4	2	Sofiane Labidi	Tunisia	47.46	Q
5	1	Hamdan Al-Bishi	Saudi Arabia	47.47	Q
6	1	Miloud Rahmani	Algeria	47.60	Q
7	2	Abdelkrim Khoudri	Morocco	48.10	q
8	1	Younés Belkaifa	Morocco	48.14	q
9	2	Fayçal Cherifi	Algeria	48.63	
10	1	Mohamed Khouaja	Libya	49.14	
11	2	Jassim Sayed Jouma	United Arab Emirates	49.44	
12	1	Abdel Salam Al Haj	Jordan	49.56	
13	1	Mohammed Attoumani	Comoros	50.54	
14	1	Ahmed Saad Ghazouane	United Arab Emirates	50.95	
15	2	Jiddou Ould Faye	Mauritania	52.17	

Final – 22 November

Rank	Name	Nationality	Time	Notes
1st place, gold medalist(s)	Nagmeldin Ali Abubakr	Sudan	46.16	
2nd place, silver medalist(s)	Hamdan Al-Bishi	Saudi Arabia	46.50	
3rd place, bronze medalist(s)	Ridha Ghali	Tunisia	46.77	
4	Miloud Rahmani	Algeria	46.99	
5	Sofiane Labidi	Tunisia	47.55	
6	Younés Belkaifa	Morocco	47.85	
7	Abdelkrim Khoudri	Morocco	47.86	
8	Ismail Al-Sabani	Saudi Arabia	48.17	

=== 800 meters ===
22 November

Rank	Name	Nationality	Time	Notes
1st place, gold medalist(s)	Abubakar Kaki	Sudan	1:43.90	NR
2nd place, silver medalist(s)	Mohammed Al-Salhi	Saudi Arabia	1:46.64	
3rd place, bronze medalist(s)	Saïd Doulal	Morocco	1:48.33	
4	Aboubakr El Gatrouni	Libya	1:48.77	
5	Bashar Al-Kafraini	Jordan	1:49.87	
6	Ali Saad Al-Daraan	Saudi Arabia	1:50.23	
7	Farah Mahamoud	Djibouti	1:52.89	
8	Abdalla Abdelgadir	Sudan	1:58.75	

=== 1500 meters ===
24 November

Rank	Name	Nationality	Time	Notes
1st place, gold medalist(s)	Abubakar Kaki	Sudan	3:47.92	
2nd place, silver medalist(s)	Mohammed Shaween	Saudi Arabia	3:48.97	
3rd place, bronze medalist(s)	Abdalla Abdelgadir	Sudan	3:48.97	
4	Badr Rassioui	Morocco	3:49.88	
5	Emad Noor	Saudi Arabia	3:51.34	
6	Abubaker Ali Kamal	Qatar	3:53.56	
7	Hatem Hamdi	Tunisia	3:54.18	
8	Bashar Al-Kafraini	Jordan	3:55.12	

=== 5000 meters ===
24 November

Rank	Name	Nationality	Time	Notes
1st place, gold medalist(s)	Abdelkader Hachlaf	Morocco	13:39.75	
2nd place, silver medalist(s)	Sultan Khamis Zaman	Qatar	13:39.79	
3rd place, bronze medalist(s)	Ali Hasan Mahboob	Bahrain	13:39.93	
4	Khoudir Aggoune	Algeria	13:43.03	
5	Mourad Marofit	Morocco	13:44.96	
6	Ahmad Hassan Abdullah	Qatar	13:46.45	
7	Hussein Al-Yami	Saudi Arabia	13:50.36	
8	Ahmed Abdullah	Sudan	13:55.03	

=== 10,000 meters ===
21 November

Rank	Name	Nationality	Time	Notes
1st place, gold medalist(s)	Ali Hasan Mahboob	Bahrain	29:29.48	
2nd place, silver medalist(s)	Sultan Khamis Zaman	Qatar	29:29.65	
3rd place, bronze medalist(s)	Moukheld Al-Outaibi	Saudi Arabia	29:29.74	
4	Khoudir Aggoune	Algeria	29:30.14	
5	Ahmad Hassan Abdullah	Qatar	29:35.90	
6	Methkal Abu Drais	Jordan	31:41.28	
7	Ahmed Hassine Mohamed	Djibouti	31:49.04	
8	Medjad Faycal	Yemen	32:07.45	

=== Half marathon ===
23 November

Rank	Name	Nationality	Time	Notes
1st place, gold medalist(s)	Brahim Beloua	Morocco	1:02:30	
2nd place, silver medalist(s)	Ali Mabrouk El Zaidi	Libya	1:02:32	
3rd place, bronze medalist(s)	Mohammed Abdelhak Zakaria	Bahrain	1:03:26	
4	Ahmed Jumah Jaber	Qatar	1:03:35	
5	Khalid Kamal Yaseen	Bahrain	1:05.33	
6	Adel Mohamed Al Firgani	Libya	1:05.35	
7	Aman Majid Awadh	Qatar	1:07.18	

=== 110 meters hurdles ===
Heats – 21 November
Wind:
Heat 1: 0.0 m/s, Heat 2: +0.7 m/s

Rank	Heat	Name	Nationality	Time	Notes
1	2	Mohamed Issa Al-Thawadi	Qatar	14.11	Q
2	2	Ali Hussein Al-Zaki	Saudi Arabia	14.12	Q
3	1	Fawaz Al-Shammari	Kuwait	14.28	Q
4	2	Othmane Hadj Lazib	Algeria	14.30	Q
5	1	Sami Ahmed Al-Haydar	Saudi Arabia	14.42	Q
6	2	Hussein Abdullah Al-Yoha	Kuwait	14.79	q
7	2	Gharib Al-Khaldi	Oman	14.96	q
8	1	El Houcine Ayed	Morocco	15.05	Q
9	1	Mohamed Al Zahran	Libya	15.52	

Final – 22 November
Wind:
+1.1 m/s

Rank	Name	Nationality	Time	Notes
1st place, gold medalist(s)	Othmane Hadj Lazib	Algeria	14.03	
2nd place, silver medalist(s)	Ali Hussein Al-Zaki	Saudi Arabia	14.60	
3rd place, bronze medalist(s)	Sami Ahmed Al-Haydar	Saudi Arabia	14.60	
4	Hussein Abdullah Al-Yoha	Kuwait	14.73	
5	El Houcine Ayed	Morocco	14.85	
	Gharib Al-Khaldi	Oman	DNF	
	Mohamed Issa Al-Thawadi	Qatar	DNF	
	Fawaz Al-Shammari	Kuwait	DNF	

=== 400 meters hurdles ===
24 November

Rank	Name	Nationality	Time	Notes
1st place, gold medalist(s)	Abderahmane Hamadi	Algeria	50.77	
2nd place, silver medalist(s)	Idriss Abdelaziz Al-Housaoui	Saudi Arabia	51.15	
3rd place, bronze medalist(s)	Ali Obaid Shirook	United Arab Emirates	51.66	
4	Bandar Yahya Shakakili	Saudi Arabia	51.91	
5	El Houcine Ayed	Morocco	52.25	
6	Abdullah Said Al-Haidi	Oman	52.64	
	Abdelkader Idris Abdelkarim	Sudan	?	

=== 3000 meters steeplechase ===
23 November

Rank	Name	Nationality	Time	Notes
1st place, gold medalist(s)	Abdelkader Hachlaf	Morocco	8:39.84	
2nd place, silver medalist(s)	Hamid Ezzine	Morocco	8:42.57	
3rd place, bronze medalist(s)	Abubaker Ali Kamal	Qatar	8:43.02	
4	Tareq Mubarak Taher	Bahrain	8:44.16	
5	Moustafa Ahmed Shebto	Qatar	8:48.51	
6	Peter Roko Ashak	Sudan	8:49.66	
7	Moussa Idriss Youssef	Sudan	8:54.16	
8	Ali Ahmed Al-Amri	Saudi Arabia	9:05.53	

=== 4 x 100 meters relay ===
23 November

Rank	Nation	Athletes	Time	Notes
1st place, gold medalist(s)	Saudi Arabia	Moussa Al Housaoui, Yahya Al-Gahes, Salem Mubarak Al-Yami, Yahya Habeeb	39.99	
2nd place, silver medalist(s)	Oman	Yousuf Darwish Awlad Thani, Juma Mubarak Al-Jabri, Abdullah Al-Sooli, Musabeh Al-Masoudi	40.12	
3rd place, bronze medalist(s)	Qatar	Al-Waleed Abdulla, Areef Ibrahim, Sulaiman Hamid Aosman, Hamad Kefah Al-Dosari	40.14	
4	Egypt	Soleiman Salem Ayed, Hatem Mersal, M.Majdi, Amr Ibrahim Mostafa Seoud	40.17	NR
5	Morocco	Aziz Ouhadi, Khalid Idriss Zougari, Ismael Daif, Yahya Berrabah	40.38	
	Jordan	?, ?, ?, ?	DNF	

=== 4 x 400 meters relay ===
24 November

Rank	Nation	Athletes	Time	Notes
1st place, gold medalist(s)	Saudi Arabia	Hamed Al-Bishi, Hamdan Al-Bishi, Mohammed Al-Salhi, Ismail Al-Sabani	3:04.74	
2nd place, silver medalist(s)	Sudan	Awadelkarim Makki, Abubaker Kaki, Salih Dar, Nagmeldin Ali Abubakr	3:06.52	NR
3rd place, bronze medalist(s)	Tunisia	Sofiane Labidi, Ridha Ghali, Mohamed Amin Guezmil, Chouaib Chelbi	3:06.83	
4	Morocco	Ismael Daif, Abdelkrim Khoudri, Younés Belkaifa, El Houcine Ayed	3:07.10	
5	Algeria	Miloud Rahmani, Fayçal Cherifi, Abderahmane Hamadi, S. Khedher	3:12.71	
6	Oman	A. Nasser, M. Salem, I. Hellal, Abdullah Said Al-Haidi	3:13.81	
7	United Arab Emirates	Jassim Sayed Jouma, Ahmed Saad Ghazouane, B. Issa, Ali Obaid Shirook	3:22.15	

=== 20,000 metres walk ===
21 November

Rank	Name	Nationality	Time	Notes
1st place, gold medalist(s)	Hassanine Sebei	Tunisia	1:36:00.2	
2nd place, silver medalist(s)	Mabrook Saleh Nasser Mohamed	Qatar	1:40:34.3	
3rd place, bronze medalist(s)	Mohamed Ameur	Algeria	1:43:35.8	
4	Hamed Faraj Abdel Jalil	Egypt	1:44:43.3	

=== High jump ===
24 November

Rank	Name	Nationality	Result	Notes
1st place, gold medalist(s)	Salem Al-Anezi	Kuwait	2.20	NR
2nd place, silver medalist(s)	Rashid Ahmed Al-Mannai	Qatar	2.17	
3rd place, bronze medalist(s)	Majed Aldin Ghazal	Syria	2.14	
3rd place, bronze medalist(s)	Jameel Fakhri Al-Qasim	Saudi Arabia	2.14	
5	Mohamed Benhadia	Algeria	2.11	
5	Karim Samir Lotfi	Egypt	2.11	
7	Hashem Issa Al-Oqabi	Saudi Arabia	2.08	
8	Jean-Claude Rabbath	Lebanon	2.05	
8	Salem Nasser Bakheet	Bahrain	2.05	
10	Mohamed Younes Idriss	Sudan	2.05	

=== Pole vault ===
22 November

Rank	Name	Nationality	Result	Notes
1st place, gold medalist(s)	Karim El Mafhoum	Morocco	5.00	
2nd place, silver medalist(s)	Abderamane Tamada	Tunisia	4.90	
3rd place, bronze medalist(s)	Sifax Khiari	Algeria	4.80	
4	Abdulla Ghanim Saeed	Qatar	4.80	
5	Ali Makki Al-Sabagha	Kuwait	4.60	
6	Mouhcine Cheaouri	Morocco	4.60	
7	Khalifa Diaj Al-Sogaey	Saudi Arabia	4.60	
8	Taher Al-Zaboon	Jordan	4.30	

=== Long jump ===
21 November

Rank	Name	Nationality	Result	Notes
1st place, gold medalist(s)	Mohamed Salman Al-Khuwalidi	Saudi Arabia	8.19	
2nd place, silver medalist(s)	Hussein Taher Al-Sabee	Saudi Arabia	8.10	
3rd place, bronze medalist(s)	Issam Nima	Algeria	7.98	
4	Hatem Mersal	Egypt	7.83	
5	Tarik Bouguetaïb	Morocco	7.79	
6	Yahya Berrabah	Morocco	7.62	
7	Ali Al-Rashidi	Kuwait	7.07	
8	Marc Habib	Lebanon	6.90	

=== Triple jump ===
23 November

Rank	Name	Nationality	Result	Notes
1st place, gold medalist(s)	Tarik Bouguetaïb	Morocco	16.46	
2nd place, silver medalist(s)	Mohammed Hamdi Awadh	Qatar	16.22	
3rd place, bronze medalist(s)	Mohamed Youssef Al-Sahabi	Bahrain	16.03	
4	Younès Moudrik	Morocco	15.99	
5	Ibrahim Abubaker Mohamed	Qatar	15.98	

=== Shot put ===
21 November

Rank	Name	Nationality	Result	Notes
1st place, gold medalist(s)	Khalid Habash Al-Suwaidi	Qatar	19.56	
2nd place, silver medalist(s)	Sultan Al-Hebshi	Saudi Arabia	19.53	
3rd place, bronze medalist(s)	Yasser Ibrahim Farag	Egypt	19.42	
4	Mostafa Abdul El-Moaty	Egypt	18.95	
5	Ahmad Hassan Gholoum	Kuwait	18.71	
6	Meshari Suroor Saad	Kuwait	18.55	
7	Mohamed Meddeb	Tunisia	17.41	
8	Rashed Saif Al-Meqbali	United Arab Emirates	17.01	NR

=== Discus throw ===
22 November

Rank	Name	Nationality	Result	Notes
1st place, gold medalist(s)	Sultan Mubarak Al-Dawoodi	Saudi Arabia	58.63	
2nd place, silver medalist(s)	Ahmed Mohamed Dheeb	Qatar	57.76	
3rd place, bronze medalist(s)	Yasser Ibrahim Farag	Egypt	57.76	
4	Haidar Nasir	Iraq	53.53	
5	Nabil Kiram	Morocco	52.78	
6	Musab Al-Momani	Jordan	51.45	
7	Ali Khelifa Maaloul	Libya	49.22	
8	Saber Salem Saeed Baiaha	United Arab Emirates	42.97	

=== Hammer throw ===
23 November

Rank	Name	Nationality	Result	Notes
1st place, gold medalist(s)	Mohsen El Anany	Egypt	74.22	
2nd place, silver medalist(s)	Ali Al-Zinkawi	Kuwait	74.02	
3rd place, bronze medalist(s)	Hassan Mohamed Abdel Jawad	Egypt	68.68	
4	Saber Souid	Tunisia	68.56	
5	Mohamed Faraj Al-Kaabi	Qatar	65.81	
6	Mohammad Al-Jawhar	Kuwait	63.44	
7	Driss Barid	Morocco	57.04	
8	Khaled Saleh Abdelnasser	Qatar	53.01	

=== Javelin throw ===
24 November

Rank	Name	Nationality	Result	Notes
1st place, gold medalist(s)	Mohamed Ali Kbabou	Tunisia	71.41	
2nd place, silver medalist(s)	Walid Abdelghani Sayed	Egypt	71.15	
3rd place, bronze medalist(s)	Mohamed Ibrahim Al-Khalifa	Qatar	69.67	
4	Hamad Khalifa Jabir	Qatar	69.59	
5	Sayed Ali Sayed	Egypt	69.08	
6	Firas Al Mahamid	Syria	68.76	
7	Abdullah Al Omairi	Kuwait	68.22	
8	Bader Nasser Al-Lenkawi	Kuwait	56.11	

=== Decathlon ===
November 23–24

The highest mark recorded in each event is highlighted in yellow

Rank	Athlete	Nationality	100m	LJ	SP	HJ	400m	110m H	DT	PV	JT	1500m	Points	Notes
1st place, gold medalist(s)	Ahmad Hassan Moussa	Qatar	11.27	6.70	13.91	1.82	49.97	15.05	40.15	4.20	69.07	4:53.69	7383	
2nd place, silver medalist(s)	Abdallah Saad Hamed	Egypt	11.50	6.89	13.30	1.91	50.29	15.34	40.06	4.30	51.92	4:47.26	7180	
3rd place, bronze medalist(s)	Mohamed Ridha Al-Matroud	Saudi Arabia	11.40	7.17	11.62	1.76	49.41	15.33	37.21	4.20	51.25	4:48.4	6995	
4	Ali Hazer	Lebanon	11.02	6.72	11.52	1.82	48.76	14.94	33.22	3.30	44.39	4:45.5	6668	
	Boualem Lamri	Algeria	11.75	7.22	11.25	1.97	51.40	14.96	29.01	3.60	?	–	DNF	
	Saad Fahad Al Bishi	Saudi Arabia	11.55	6.25	12.21	1.82	?	–	–	–	–	–	DNF	

== Women's results ==
=== 100 meters ===
Heats – 21 November

Rank	Heat	Name	Nationality	Time	Notes
1	2	Faten Abdunnari Mahdi	Bahrain	12.06	Q
2	2	Dana Hussein Abdul-Razzaq	Iraq	12.29	Q
3	2	Fatima Zahra Dkouk	Morocco	12.34	Q
4	1	Gretta Taslakian	Lebanon	12.45	Q
5	2	Gubara Asmal	Sudan	12.64	q
6	1	Fadoua Adili	Morocco	12.72	Q
7	2	Alaa Al Saffar	Kuwait	13.07	q, NR
8	1	Shaikha Al-Dosari	Qatar	13.48	Q, NR
9	1	Fatima Sulaiman Dahman	Yemen	13.92	
10	2	Bonko Camara	Mauritania	14.05	
11	1	Fatima Amer Faraj	Bahrain	14.94	

Final – 22 November
Wind: +1.4 m/s

Rank	Name	Nationality	Time	Notes
1st place, gold medalist(s)	Gretta Taslakian	Lebanon	12.07	
2nd place, silver medalist(s)	Dana Hussein Abdul-Razzaq	Iraq	12.20	
3rd place, bronze medalist(s)	Faten Abdunnari Mahdi	Bahrain	12.28	
4	Fatima Zahra Dkouk	Morocco	12.28	
5	Gubara Asmal	Sudan	12.65	
6	Alaa Al Saffar	Kuwait	12.97	NR
7	Fadoua Adili	Morocco	13.00	
8	Shaikha Al-Dosari	Qatar	13.32	NR

=== 200 meters ===
24 November
Wind: +1.4 m/s

Rank	Name	Nationality	Time	Notes
1st place, gold medalist(s)	Gretta Taslakian	Lebanon	23.56	NR
2nd place, silver medalist(s)	Nawal El Jack	Sudan	24.25	
3rd place, bronze medalist(s)	Faten Abdunnari Mahdi	Bahrain	24.73	
4	Dana Hussein Abdul-Razzaq	Iraq	24.83	NR
5	Fatima Sulaiman Dahman	Yemen	27.53	NR
6	Sabrine Ali Youssef	Bahrain	28.78	
	Fayza Omar	Sudan	?	
	Fadoua Adili	Morocco	?	

=== 400 meters ===
22 November

Rank	Name	Nationality	Time	Notes
1st place, gold medalist(s)	Nawal El Jack	Sudan	54.15	
2nd place, silver medalist(s)	Hanane Skhyi	Morocco	55.36	
3rd place, bronze medalist(s)	Fayza Omar	Sudan	56.90	
4	Rasha Yasin	Iraq	59.13	
	Alaa Al Saffar	Kuwait	?	

=== 800 meters ===
22 November

Rank	Name	Nationality	Time	Notes
1st place, gold medalist(s)	Amina Bakhit	Sudan	2:07.95	
2nd place, silver medalist(s)	Amina Aït Hammou	Morocco	2:08.85	
3rd place, bronze medalist(s)	Halima Hachlaf	Morocco	2:09.50	
4	Samara Nawam Khazal	Iraq	2:13.69	
5	Ihsan Jibril	Sudan	2:17.54	
	Sarah Bakhit Youssef	Bahrain	DNS	

=== 1500 meters ===
24 November

Rank	Name	Nationality	Time	Notes
1st place, gold medalist(s)	Seltana Aït Hammou	Morocco	4:23.54	
2nd place, silver medalist(s)	Amina Bakhit	Sudan	4:24.74	
3rd place, bronze medalist(s)	Sarah Bakhit Youssef	Bahrain	4:24.94	
4	Bouchra Chaâbi	Morocco	4:26.41	
5	Safa Issaoui	Tunisia	4:31.00	
6	Ihsan Jibril	Sudan	4:33.08	
	Baraa Marouane	Jordan	?	

=== 5000 meters ===
22 November

Rank	Name	Nationality	Time	Notes
1st place, gold medalist(s)	Safa Issaoui	Tunisia	19:13.96	
2nd place, silver medalist(s)	Sarah Bakhit Youssef	Bahrain	19:14.50	
3rd place, bronze medalist(s)	Hanane Ouhaddou	Morocco	19:14.96	
4	Bouchra Chaâbi	Morocco	19:15.90	
5	Mashaer Ali Abdelreda	Sudan	19:22.74	

=== 10,000 meters ===
23 November

Rank	Name	Nationality	Time	Notes
1st place, gold medalist(s)	Nadia Ejjafini	Bahrain	32:29.53	
2nd place, silver medalist(s)	Maria Laghrissi	Morocco	34:39.80	
3rd place, bronze medalist(s)	Mashaer Ali Abdelreda	Sudan	37:44.72	

=== Half marathon ===
23 November

Rank	Name	Nationality	Time	Notes
1st place, gold medalist(s)	Kareema Saleh Jasim	Bahrain	1:15:15	
2nd place, silver medalist(s)	Kenza Dahmani	Algeria	1:15:37	
3rd place, bronze medalist(s)	Ouafae Frikech	Morocco	1:18:57	
4	Fatma Al-Orafi	Yemen	1:48.54	NR

=== 100 metres hurdles ===
22 November
Wind: +1.2 m/s

Rank	Name	Nationality	Time	Notes
1st place, gold medalist(s)	Lamiae Lhabze	Morocco	14.21	
2nd place, silver medalist(s)	Selma Emam Abou El-Hassan	Egypt	14.38	
3rd place, bronze medalist(s)	Fadwa Al-Boza	Syria	14.53	
4	Naima Bentahar	Algeria	14.57	
5	Samira Harrouche	Algeria	14.80	

=== 400 metres hurdles ===
24 November

Rank	Name	Nationality	Time	Notes
1st place, gold medalist(s)	Muna Jabir Adam	Sudan	56.07	
2nd place, silver medalist(s)	Hanane Skhyi	Morocco	57.31	
3rd place, bronze medalist(s)	Houria Moussa	Algeria	58.17	
4	Lamiae Lhabze	Morocco	59.88	
5	Manaseh Jibral Yakoub	Sudan	1:05.32	

=== 3000 meters steeplechase ===
21 November

Rank	Name	Nationality	Time	Notes
1st place, gold medalist(s)	Hanane Ouhaddou	Morocco	10:30.33	
2nd place, silver medalist(s)	Durka Mana	Sudan	10:49.34	
3rd place, bronze medalist(s)	Baraa Marouane	Jordan	12:02.18	

=== 4 x 100 meters relay ===
23 November

Rank	Nation	Athletes	Time	Notes
1st place, gold medalist(s)	Morocco	Fadoua Adili, Lamiae Lhabze, Hanane Skhyi, Fatima Zahra Dkouk	47.42	
2nd place, silver medalist(s)	Sudan	Amina Bakhit, Gubara Asmal, Nawal El Jack, Muna Jabir Adam	47.43	NR
3rd place, bronze medalist(s)	Iraq	Dana Abdul Razak, Rasha Abed Yaseen, Alaa Hekmat, Khazaal Al-Sudani Inam	48.20	
4	Egypt	N. Zaki, Y. Magdi, R. Ismail, S. Ismail	48.36	
5	Algeria	Houria Moussa, Naima Bentahar, Samira Harrouche, Camélia Sahnoune	48.79	

=== 4 x 400 meters relay ===
24 November

Rank	Nation	Athletes	Time	Notes
1st place, gold medalist(s)	Sudan	Fayza Omer Jomaa, Nawal El Jack, Muna Jabir Adam, Amina Bakhit	3:38.56	
2nd place, silver medalist(s)	Morocco	Lamiae Lhabze, Amina Aït Hammou, Seltana Aït Hammou, Hanane Skhyi	3:44.85	
3rd place, bronze medalist(s)	Iraq	Dana Hussein Abdul-Razzaq, Rasha Abed Yaseen, Alaa Hekmat, Khazaal Al-Sudani Inam	3:54.96	

=== 10,000 metres walk ===
22 November

Rank	Name	Nationality	Time	Notes
1st place, gold medalist(s)	Chaïma Trabelsi	Tunisia	53:52.0	
2nd place, silver medalist(s)	Nagwa Ibrahim Saleh Ali	Egypt	55:14.6	
3rd place, bronze medalist(s)	Ghania Amzal	Algeria	56:51.3	
4	Rania Mohamed Othman	Syria	58:18.6	

=== High jump ===
22 November

Rank	Name	Nationality	Result	Notes
1st place, gold medalist(s)	Karima Ben Othman	Tunisia	1.77	
2nd place, silver medalist(s)	Yamilé Aldama	Sudan	1.77	
3rd place, bronze medalist(s)	Rim Abdallah Hussin	Egypt	1.68	
4	Hanan Al-Khamis	Kuwait	1.45	
5	Mouzi Mohd Ali	Qatar	1.25	
	Meryem Ouahbi	Morocco	NM	

=== Pole vault ===
23 November

Rank	Name	Nationality	Result	Notes
1st place, gold medalist(s)	Leila Ben Youssef	Tunisia	3.80	
2nd place, silver medalist(s)	Nisrine Dinar	Morocco	3.80	
3rd place, bronze medalist(s)	Nesrine Ahmed Eman	Morocco	3.70	NR
4	Ouahiba Hamreras	Algeria	3.10	

=== Long jump ===
21 November

Rank	Name	Nationality	Result	Notes
1st place, gold medalist(s)	Fatima Zahra Dkouk	Morocco	6.16	
2nd place, silver medalist(s)	Yamilé Aldama	Sudan	6.05	
3rd place, bronze medalist(s)	Inas Gharib	Egypt	5.93	
4	Yamina Hjaji	Morocco	5.83	
5	Moufida Anine	Algeria	5.72	
6	Rima Taha	Jordan	5.60	
7	Shifa Anabtwi	Jordan	5.12	

=== Triple jump ===
24 November

Rank	Name	Nationality	Result	Notes
1st place, gold medalist(s)	Fadwa Al Bouza	Syria	12.61	
2nd place, silver medalist(s)	Fatima Zahra Dkouk	Morocco	12.60	
3rd place, bronze medalist(s)	Camélia Sahnoune	Algeria	12.57	
4	Jamaa Chnaik	Morocco	12.54	
5	Inas Gharib	Egypt	12.53	
6	Rima Taha	Jordan	12.24	NR
7	Shifa Anabtwi	Jordan	11.87	

=== Shot put ===
22 November

Rank	Name	Nationality	Result	Notes
1st place, gold medalist(s)	Wala Mohamed Atia	Egypt	14.60	
2nd place, silver medalist(s)	Amel Ben Khaled	Tunisia	14.02	
3rd place, bronze medalist(s)	Monia Kari	Tunisia	12.58	
4	Hiba Omar	Syria	12.31	
5	Jamila Khamis	Qatar	7.00	NR
6	Fatima Al-Maliki	Qatar	6.45	
	Wafa Ismail El Baghdadi	Egypt	DQ	Doping

=== Discus throw ===
21 November

Rank	Name	Nationality	Result	Notes
1st place, gold medalist(s)	Monia Kari	Tunisia	52.79	
2nd place, silver medalist(s)	Heba Zachary	Egypt	49.73	
3rd place, bronze medalist(s)	Sara Sayed Hassib	Egypt	45.26	
4	Hiba Omar	Syria	38.49	
5	Ebtehal Abbud	Libya	35.44	

=== Hammer throw ===
24 November

Rank	Name	Nationality	Result	Notes
1st place, gold medalist(s)	Marwa Hussein	Egypt	62.83	
2nd place, silver medalist(s)	Mouna Dani	Morocco	57.36	
3rd place, bronze medalist(s)	Imane Mohamed Abdelhakim	Egypt	55.40	
4	Khedidja Jallouz	Tunisia	49.70	
5	Zouina Bouzebra	Algeria	42.66	

=== Javelin throw ===
23 November

Rank	Name	Nationality	Result	Notes
1st place, gold medalist(s)	Hana'a Ramadhan Omar	Egypt	48.28	
2nd place, silver medalist(s)	Safa Mohamed Mekkawi	Egypt	45.91	
3rd place, bronze medalist(s)	Sabiha Mzoughi	Tunisia	42.02	
4	Ebtehal Abbud	Libya	35.53	NR

=== Heptathlon ===
November 21–22

The highest mark recorded in each event is highlighted in yellow

Rank	Athlete	Nationality	100m H	HJ	SP	200m	LJ	JT	800m	Points	Notes
1st place, gold medalist(s)	Muna Jabir Adam	Sudan	15.05	1.54	8.82	24.87	5.15	32.61	2:36.37	4594	
2nd place, silver medalist(s)	Chima Fethi Tehemar	Egypt	15.95	1.57	9.93	27.44	5.23	26.59	2:39.81	4232	
3rd place, bronze medalist(s)	Katia Amokrane	Algeria	17.42	1.45	9.88	28.14	4.31	26.52	2:38.82	3637	
