= 2007 Arab Athletics Championships =

15th Arab Athletics Championships
- Dates: 18–21 May
- Host city: Amman, Jordan
- Events: 46
- Participation: 17 nations

The 2007 Arab Athletics Championships was the fifteenth edition of the international athletics competition between Arab countries which took place in Amman, Jordan from 18–21 May. The competition was held earlier than its usual scheduling due to the 2007 Pan Arab Games being held in November.

== Medal summary ==
=== Men ===
Event	Gold		Silver		Bronze	
100 metres (wind: -1.1 m/s)	Yahya Habeeb (KSA)	10.41	Omar Mustafa (EGY)	10.44	Al-Waleed Abdulla (QAT)	10.44
200 metres	Al-Waleed Abdulla (QAT)	20.94	Hamed Al-Bishi (KSA)	21.06	Khalil El Hanahna (JOR)	21.11
400 metres	Ismael Daif (MAR)	46.39	Hamed Al-Bishi (KSA)	46.43	Nagmeldin Ali Abubakr (SUD)	46.81
800 metres	Abubaker Kaki Khamis (SUD)	1:45.09	Belal Mansoor Ali (BHR)	1:46.08	Samir Khadar (ALG)	1:47.05
1500 metres	Mohamed Moustaoui (MAR)	3:36.90	Belal Mansoor Ali (BHR)	3:43.26	Abdalla Abdelgadir (SUD)	3:44.74
5000 metres	Mohammed Amyn (MAR)	13:53.48	Gamal Belal Salem (QAT)	13:54.39	Hasan Mahboob (BHR)	13:57.47
10,000 metres	Mohammed Amyn (MAR)	28:26.19	Hasan Mahboob (BHR)	28:26.60	Ahmed Baday (MAR)	28:27.33
110 metres hurdles	Mohamed Issa Al-Thawadi (QAT)	13.94	Abdelrahman Idris Taher (EGY)	14.13	Fawzi Al-Shammari (KUW)	14.17
400 metres hurdles	Idris Abdelaziz Al-Housaoui (KSA)	51.14	Ali Obaid Shirook (UAE)	52.31	Mohamed Hafiz (SUD)	52.61
3000 metres steeplechase	Tareq Mubarak Taher (BHR)	8:31.64	Thamer Kamal Ali (QAT)	8:32.54	Gamal Belal Salem (QAT)	8:36.64
4×100 m relay	Saudi Arabia (KSA)	39.53	Qatar (QAT)	40.25	Oman (OMN)	40.73
4×400 m relay	Saudi Arabia (KSA)	3:07.97	Morocco (MAR)	3:08.35	Sudan (SUD)	3:10.56
Half marathon	Moustafa Ahmed Shebto (QAT)	1:02:21	Ali Mabrouk El Zaidi (LBA)	1:02:47	Khalid Kamal Yaseen (BHR)	1:03:29
20 km walk	Hassanine Sebei (TUN)	1:26:13	Hichem Medjeber (ALG)	1:35:12	Waleed Ahmed Al-Sabahy (QAT)	1:36:13
High jump	Jean-Claude Rabbath (LIB)	2.23 m	Jamal Fakhri Al-Qasim (KSA)	2.20 m	Majd Eddin Ghazal (SYR)	2.17 m
Pole vault	Ali Makki Al-Sabagha (KUW)	5.10 m	Karim El Mafhoum (MAR)	5.05 m	Fahid Bader Al-Mershad (KUW)	5.00 m
Long jump	Mohammed Al-Khuwalidi (KSA)	7.93 m	Tarik Bouguetaïb (MAR)	7.79 m	Saleh Abdelaziz Al-Haddad (KUW)	7.70 m
Triple jump	Tarik Bouguetaïb (MAR)	16.39 m	Mohamed Abdulaziz Hamdi Awadh (QAT)	15.99 m	Mohamed Yusuf Salman (BHR)	15.85 m
Shot put	Ahmad Hassan Gholoum (KUW)	19.18 m	Yasser Ibrahim Farag (EGY)	18.70 m	Mostafa Abdul El-Moaty (EGY)	18.10 m
Discus throw	Omar Ahmed El Ghazaly (EGY)	63.66 m	Yasser Ibrahim Farag (EGY)	59.71 m	Rashid Shafi Al-Dosari (QAT)	58.84 m
Hammer throw	Ali Al-Zinkawi (KUW)	76.90 m	Mohammad Al-Jawhar (KUW)	67.48 m	Ahmed Mohamed Abd El Raouf (EGY)	66.44 m
Javelin throw	Mohamed Ali Kebabou (TUN)	71.54 m	Firas Al Mahamid (SYR)	68.60 m	Hamad Khalifa Jabir (QAT)	67.83 m
Decathlon	Mohammed J.M. Al-Qaree (KSA)	7366 pts	Ahmad Hassan Moussa (QAT)	7078 pts	Larbi Bouraada (ALG)	7046 pts

=== Women ===
Event	Gold		Silver		Bronze	
100 metres	Ruqaya Al-Ghasra (BHR)	11.34	Gretta Taslakian (LIB)	12.11	Fadoua Adili (MAR)	12.19
200 metres	Ruqaya Al-Ghasra (BHR)	22.07	Gretta Taslakian (LIB)	24.01	Jomaa Fayza Omer (SUD)	24.06
400 metres	Muna Jabir Adam (SUD)	53.10	Jomaa Fayza Omer (SUD)	54.72	Ghfran Almouhamad (SYR)	55.25
800 metres	Saïda El Mehdi (MAR)	2:06.08	Siham Hilali (MAR)	2:06.09	Nahida Touhami (ALG)	2:08.02
1500 metres	Siham Hilali (MAR)	4:18.71	Saïda El Mehdi (MAR)	4:18.77	Sara Bakheet (BHR)	4:21.53
5000 metres	Hanane Ouhaddou (MAR)	15:50	Kareema Saleh Jasim (BHR)	15:53	Nadia Ejjafini (BHR)	15:54
10,000 metres	Nadia Ejjafini (BHR)	33:25.31	Mashaer Ali (SUD)	35:17.13	Ebrish Badiya (BHR)	36:02.68
100 metres hurdles	Lamiae Lhabze (MAR)	14.00	Fadoua Al-Boza (SYR)	14.01	Salma Emam Abou El-Hassan (EGY)	14.04
400 metres hurdles	Hanane Skhyi (MAR)	57.01	Lamiae Lhabze (MAR)	57.71	Muna Jabir Adam (SUD)	57.98
3000 metres steeplechase	Hanane Ouhaddou (MAR)	9:53.28	Bouchra Chaâbi (MAR)	10:06.54	Baraa Marouane (JOR)	12:00.96
4×100 m relay	Morocco (MAR)	47.03	Bahrain (BHR)	49.09	Egypt (EGY)	51.63
4×400 m relay	Morocco (MAR)	3:43.46	Sudan (SUD)	3:56.71	Jordan (JOR)	4:10.29
Half marathon	Kareema Saleh Jasim (BHR)	1:14:33	Kenza Dahmani (ALG)	1:15:41	Abir El Ghoul (JOR)	1:36:35
10 km walk	Chaima Trabelsi (TUN)	50:06.0	Nagwa Ibrahim Saleh Ali (EGY)	51:16.6	Ghania Amzal (ALG)	52:15.6
High jump	Karima Ben Othmani (TUN)	1.70 m	Reem Abdullah (EGY)	1.70 m	Reham Sheeha (SYR)	1.55 m
Pole vault	Nisrine Dinar (MAR)	4.00 m	Nada Abdellatif (EGY)	3.45 m	Reham Sheeha (SYR)	2.80 m
Long jump	Yamilé Aldama (SUD)	6.34 m	Rima Taha (JOR)	6.01 m	Yamina Hjaji (MAR)	5.90 m
Triple jump	Yamilé Aldama (SUD)	14.35 m	Enas Gharib (EGY)	12.54 m	Yamina Hjaji (MAR)	12.24 m
Shot put	Wafaa Ismail Baghdadi (EGY)	14.70 m	Amel Ben Khaled (TUN)	14.92 m	Heba Zachary (EGY)	13.60 m
Discus throw	Monia Kari (TUN)	50.34 m	Heba Zachary (EGY)	44.03 m	Hiba Omar (SYR)	41.86 m
Hammer throw	Marwa Ahmed Hessine (EGY)	60.63 m	Mouna Dani (MAR)	58.09 m	Raoud Ayd Hussein (EGY)	43.59 m
Javelin throw	Hana'a Ramadhan Omar (EGY)	48.56 m	Aïda Sellam (TUN)	44.60 m	Muna Jabir Adam (SUD)	37.15 m
Heptathlon	Muna Jabir Adam (SUD)	4815 pts	Fadoua Al-Boza (SYR)	4211 pts	Aida Chaabane (JOR)	3515 pts

== Medal table ==
=== Overall ===
Rank	Nation	Gold	Silver	Bronze	Total
1	Morocco (MAR)	14	8	4	26
2	Saudi Arabia (KSA)	6	3	0	9
3	Bahrain (BHR)	5	5	6	16
4	Sudan (SUD)	5	3	7	15
5	Tunisia (TUN)	5	2	0	7
6	Egypt (EGY)	4	9	6	19
7	Qatar (QAT)	3	4	6	13
8	Kuwait (KUW)	3	1	3	7
9	Lebanon (LIB)	1	2	0	3
10	Syria	0	3	5	8
11	Algeria (ALG)	0	2	4	6
12	Jordan (JOR)	0	1	5	6
13	Libya	0	1	0	1
13	Oman (OMN)	0	1	0	1
13	United Arab Emirates (UAE)	0	1	0	1
16	Iraq (IRQ)	0	0	0	0
16	Palestine (PLE)	0	0	0	0
Totals (17 entries)		46	46	46	138

=== Men ===
Rank	Nation	Gold	Silver	Bronze	Total
1	Saudi Arabia (KSA)	6	3	0	9
2	Morocco (MAR)	5	3	1	9
3	Qatar (QAT)	3	4	6	13
4	Kuwait (KUW)	3	1	3	7
5	Tunisia (TUN)	2	0	0	2
6	Egypt (EGY)	1	4	2	7
7	Bahrain (BHR)	1	3	3	7
8	Sudan (SUD)	1	0	4	5
9	Lebanon (LIB)	1	0	0	1
10	Algeria (ALG)	0	1	2	3
11	Syria	0	1	1	2
12	Libya (LBA)	0	1	0	1
12	Oman (OMN)	0	1	0	1
14	Iraq (IRQ)	0	0	0	0
14	Palestine (PLE)	0	0	0	0
Totals (15 entries)		23	22	22	67

=== Women ===
Rank	Nation	Gold	Silver	Bronze	Total
1	Morocco (MAR)	9	5	3	17
2	Sudan (SUD)	4	3	3	10
3	Bahrain (BHR)	4	2	3	9
4	Egypt (EGY)	3	5	4	12
5	Tunisia (TUN)	3	2	0	5
6	Syria	0	2	4	6
7	Lebanon (LIB)	0	2	0	2
8	Jordan (JOR)	0	1	4	5
9	Algeria (ALG)	0	1	2	3
10	Palestine (PLE)	0	0	0	0
Totals (10 entries)		23	23	23	69

== See also ==
- Athletics at the 2007 Pan Arab Games
