= Sudan at the World Athletics Championships =

- Flag of Sudan
- WA code: SUD
- Medals: Gold 0 Silver 1 Bronze 0 Total 1

World Athletics Championships appearances (overview)
- 1983; 1987; 1991; 1993; 1995; 1997; 1999; 2001; 2003; 2005; 2007; 2009; 2011; 2013; 2015; 2017; 2019; 2022; 2023; 2025

Sudan has competed in every World Athletics Championships editions since 1983. While being present in every championship contested, it has only been on the podium once, with a silver medal by Abubaker Kaki in the 800 meters at 2011 World Championships in Athletics. The best finish by a sudan female athlete was achieved by cuban-born jumper Yamilé Aldama in 2005 with a 4th place.

== Medalists ==
Medal	Name	Year	Event
Silver	Abubaker Kaki	2011 Daegu	Men's 800 meters

=== By event ===
Event	Gold	Silver	Bronze	Total
800 meters	0	1	0	1
Totals (1 entries)	0	1	0	1

=== By gender ===
Gender	Gold	Silver	Bronze	Total
Men	0	1	0	1
Women	0	0	0	0

== See also ==
- Sudan at the Olympics
- Sudan at the Paralympics
