= 2005 Arab Athletics Championships =

14th Arab Athletics Championships
- Dates: 12–15 September
- Host city: Radès/Tunis, Tunisia
- Events: 46
- Participation: 14 nations

The 2005 Arab Athletics Championships was the fourteenth edition of the international athletics competition between Arab countries which took place in Radès/Tunis, Tunisia from 12–15 September.

== Medal summary ==
=== Men ===
Event	Gold		Silver		Bronze	
100 metres (wind: +1.1 m/s)	Yahya Al-Ghahes (KSA)	10.28	Mohammed Farhan Khalifa (BHR)	10.46	Saad Faraj Al-Shahwani (QAT)	10.56
200 metres	Hamed Al-Bishi (KSA)	20.96	Soleiman Salem Ayed (QAT)	21.23	Khaled Youssef Al-Obaidli (QAT)	21.33
400 metres	Nagmeldin Ali Abubakr (SUD)	45.66	Mohammed Al-Salhi (KSA)	45.94	Ridha Ghali (TUN)	46.98
800 metres	Yusuf Saad Kamel (BHR)	1:47.36	Salem Amer Al-Badri (QAT)	1:48.38	Abubaker Kaki Khamis (SUD)	1:48.43
1500 metres	Belal Mansoor Ali (BHR)	3:38.85	Abdalla Abdelgadir (SUD)	3:41.74	Abubaker Ali Kamal (QAT)	3:42.54
5000 metres	Essa Ismail Rashed (QAT)	13:53.15	Aadam Ismaeel Khamis (BHR)	13:53.20	Ishak Aissa (BHR)	14:25.41
10,000 metres	Essa Ismail Rashed (QAT)	28:36.39	Khalid Kamal Yaseen (BHR)	28:36.88 NR	Shahine Mahjoob (BHR)	30:29.15
110 metres hurdles (Wind: +4.2 m/s)	Hamdi Mhirsi (TUN)	13.82	Aymen Ben Ahmed (TUN)	13.86	Mubarak Ata Mubarak (KSA)	13.96
400 metres hurdles	Kamel Tabbal (TUN)	50.84	Laroussi Titi (TUN)	51.21	Bandar Yahya Shraheli (KSA)	52.12
3000 metres steeplechase	Tareq Mubarak Taher (BHR)	8:40.16	Moustafa Ahmed Shebto (QAT)	8:41.54	Merzouk Ould Bouchiba (ALG)	8:47.78
4×100 m relay	Saudi Arabia (KSA); Faraj Al Dosari; Mubarak Ata Mubarak; Yahya Al-Ghahes; Hamed Al-Bishi	39.88	Qatar (QAT); Mohamed Nasser; Khaled Youssef Al-Obaidli; Abdullah Khamis Al-Hamad; Saad Faraj Al-Shahwani	40.13	Oman (OMN); Abdullah Al-Sooli; Juma Mubarak Al-Jabri; Mousabha Al-Masoudi; Yousuf Darwish Awlad Thani	40.60
4×400 m relay	Saudi Arabia (KSA); Hamdan Odha Al-Bishi; Bandar Yahya Shraheli; Hamed Hamdan Al-Bishi; Mohammed Al-Salhi	3:05.77	Sudan (SUD); Adam El-Nour; Wilyam Filiph Rabih; Nagmeldin Ali Abubakr; Salah Edam	3:07.76 NR	Tunisia (TUN); Aymen Ben Ahmed; Laroussi Titi; Kamel Tabbal; Ridha Ghali	3:12.34
Half marathon	Khalid Kamal Yaseen (BHR)	1:04:18	Abel Yakut Juhar (BHR)	1:04:19	Mohamed Abdelhamid (QAT)	1:04:41
20 km walk	Hassanine Sebei (TUN)	1:28:18	Mabrook Saleh Mohamed (QAT)	1:38:40	Hichem Medjeber (ALG)	1:39:5
High jump	Omar Moussa Al-Masrahi (KSA)	2.18 m	Salem Nasser Bakheet (BHR)	2.16 m	Karim Lotfy (EGY)	2.14 m
Pole vault	Béchir Zaghouani (TUN)	5.00 m	Fahid Bader Al-Mershad (KUW)	4.90 m	Abderamane Tamada (TUN)	4.80 m
Long jump	Issam Nima (ALG)	8.09 m (w)	Ahmed Faiz Bin Marzouq (KSA)	8.08 m (w)	Saleh Abdelaziz Al-Haddad (KUW)	7.63 m (w)
Triple jump	Ibrahim Mohamedin (QAT)	16.59 m	Salem Al-Ahmedi (KSA)	16.28 m	Mohammad Al-Majrashi (KSA)	16.27 m (w)
Shot put	Khalid Habash Al-Suwaidi (QAT)	19.70 m	Yasser Ibrahim Farag (EGY)	18.06 m	Ahmad Hassan Gholoum (KUW)	17.77 m
Discus throw	Omar Ahmed El Ghazaly (EGY)	60.87 m	Sultan Al-Dawoodi (KSA)	56.00 m	Yasser Ibrahim Farag (EGY)	55.20 m
Hammer throw	Ali Al-Zinkawi (KUW)	76.10 m	Saber Souid (TUN)	71.01 m	Ahmed Mohamed Abd El Raouf (EGY)	69.07 m
Javelin throw	Walid Abderrazak Mohamed (EGY)	74.18 m	Wisam Mohamed Shahal (IRQ)	68.06 m NR	Fakhri Zouaoui (TUN)	67.84 m
Decathlon	Boualem Lamri (ALG)	6832 pts	Abdallah Mohamed Saad Hamed (EGY)	5592 pts	Khalifa Abdullah (BHR)	3805 pts

=== Women ===
Event	Gold		Silver		Bronze	
100 metres (Wind: +2.5 m/s)	Awatef Hamrouni (TUN)	11.90	Faten Abdunnari Mahdi (BHR)	12.03	Munira Saleh (SYR)	12.06
200 metres	Nawal El Jack (SUD)	23.97 NR	Munira Saleh (SYR)	24.55	Faten Abdunnari Mahdi (BHR)	25.34
400 metres	Nawal El Jack (SUD)	53.43	Munira Saleh (SYR)	56.34	Jomaa Fayza Omer (SUD)	57.54
800 metres	Maryam Yusuf Jamal (BHR)	2:09.73	Amina Bakhit (SUD)	2:11.37	Iman Al-Jallad (SYR)	2:15.50
1500 metres	Maryam Yusuf Jamal (BHR)	4:10.31	Safa Aissaoui (TUN)	4:16.25	Hind Musa (SUD)	4:21.17 NR
5000 metres	Maryam Yusuf Jamal (BHR)	16:53.25	Safa Aissaoui (TUN)	16:56.15	Kareema Saleh Jasim (BHR)	17:00.04
10,000 metres	Kareema Saleh Jasim (BHR)	34:45.47 NR	Habiba Ghribi (TUN)	35:05.83	Mashaer Ali (SUD)	35:11.18
100 metres hurdles	Naïma Bentahar (ALG)	14.27	Fadwa Al-Bouza (SYR)	14.38	Sabra Dhaouadi (TUN)	14.67
400 metres hurdles	Muna Jabir Adam (SUD)	57.88	Nawal El Jack (SUD)	58.92	Houria Moussa (ALG)	60.93
4×100 m relay	Tunisia (TUN); Nahed Abid; Sabra Dhaouadi; Amani Khemir; Awatef Hamrouni	47.36	Syria (SYR); Ghfran Almouhamad; Nesrine Mardli; Fadwa Al-Bouza; Munira Saleh	48.35	Only two finishers	
4×400 m relay	Sudan (SUD); Jomaa Fayza Omer; Nawal El Jack; Hind Musa; Muna Jabir Adam	3:41.43	Syria (SYR); Fadwa Al-Bouza; Ghfran Almouhamad; Iman Al-Jallad; Munira Saleh	3:49.75	Tunisia (TUN); Amel Ltifi; Aida Chaabane; Safa Aissaoui; Maha Chaouachi	3:49.76
Half marathon	Kareema Saleh Jasim (BHR)	1:19:30	Nadia Ejjafini (BHR)	1:24:03	Hanaa Said Hamed (EGY)	1:43:54
10 km walk	Ghania Amzal (ALG)	49:33.	Rahma Mahmoudi (TUN)	50:10.	Bahia Boussad (ALG)	52:04.
High jump	Yamilé Aldama (SUD)	1.81 m	Karima Ben Othmani (TUN)	1.75 m	Sabra Ben Saïd (TUN)	1.70 m
Pole vault	Syrine Balti (TUN)	3.80 m	Nadia Belkhir (TUN)	3.60 m	Nesrine Mardaly (SYR)	2.30 m
Long jump	Yamilé Aldama (SUD)	6.19 m NR	Awatef Hamrouni (TUN)	5.99 m (w)	Najoua Mathlouthi (TUN)	5.65 m
Triple jump	Yamilé Aldama (SUD)	14.05 m	Najoua Mathlouthi (TUN)	12.68 m	Camélia Sahnoune (ALG)	12.59 m
Shot put	Amel Ben Khaled (TUN)	15.36 m	Wafaa Ismail Baghdadi (EGY)	14.75 m	Ghada Ghezal (TUN)	12.69 m
Discus throw	Monia Kari (TUN)	54.61 m	Kalthoum Saadaoui (TUN)	35.91 m	Marwa Hussein (EGY)	33.45 m
Hammer throw	Marwa Hussein (EGY)	62.52 m	Iman Mohamed Abdelkarim (EGY)	53.19 m	Khadija Jallouz (JOR)	50.81 m
Javelin throw	Hana'a Ramadhan Omar (EGY)	52.00 m	Imen Chatbri (TUN)	46.77 m	Saloua Dhouibi (TUN)	40.38 m
Heptathlon	Muna Jabir Adam (SUD)	4977 pts NR	Fadwa Al-Bouza (SYR)	4550 pts	Aida Chaabane (JOR)	4516 pts

== Medal table ==
=== Overall ===
Rank	Nation	Gold	Silver	Bronze	Total
1	Tunisia (TUN)	9	13	12	34
2	Bahrain (BHR)	9	7	5	21
3	Sudan (SUD)	8	4	4	16
4	Egypt (EGY)	5	5	5	15
5	Saudi Arabia (KSA)	5	4	3	12
6	Qatar (QAT)	4	4	4	12
7	Algeria (ALG)	4	0	5	9
8	Kuwait (KUW)	1	1	2	4
9	Syria	0	6	3	9
10	Iraq (IRQ)	0	1	0	1
11	Oman (OMN)	0	0	1	1
12	Libya	0	0	0	0
12	Palestine (PLE)	0	0	0	0
12	United Arab Emirates (UAE)	0	0	0	0
Totals (14 entries)		45	45	44	134

=== Men ===
Rank	Nation	Gold	Silver	Bronze	Total
1	Saudi Arabia (KSA)	5	4	3	12
2	Bahrain (BHR)	4	5	3	12
3	Qatar (QAT)	4	4	4	12
4	Tunisia (TUN)	4	3	4	11
5	Egypt (EGY)	2	3	3	8
6	Algeria (ALG)	2	0	2	4
7	Sudan (SUD)	1	2	1	4
8	Kuwait (KUW)	1	1	2	4
9	Iraq (IRQ)	0	1	0	1
10	Oman (OMN)	0	0	1	1
Totals (10 entries)		23	23	23	69

=== Women ===
Rank	Nation	Gold	Silver	Bronze	Total
1	Sudan (SUD)	8	2	3	13
2	Tunisia (TUN)	5	10	8	23
3	Bahrain (BHR)	5	2	2	9
4	Egypt (EGY)	2	2	2	6
5	Algeria (ALG)	2	0	3	5
6	Syria	0	6	3	9
Totals (6 entries)		22	22	21	65
