= Athletics at the 2007 Arab Games =

Athletics at the XI Pan Arab Games
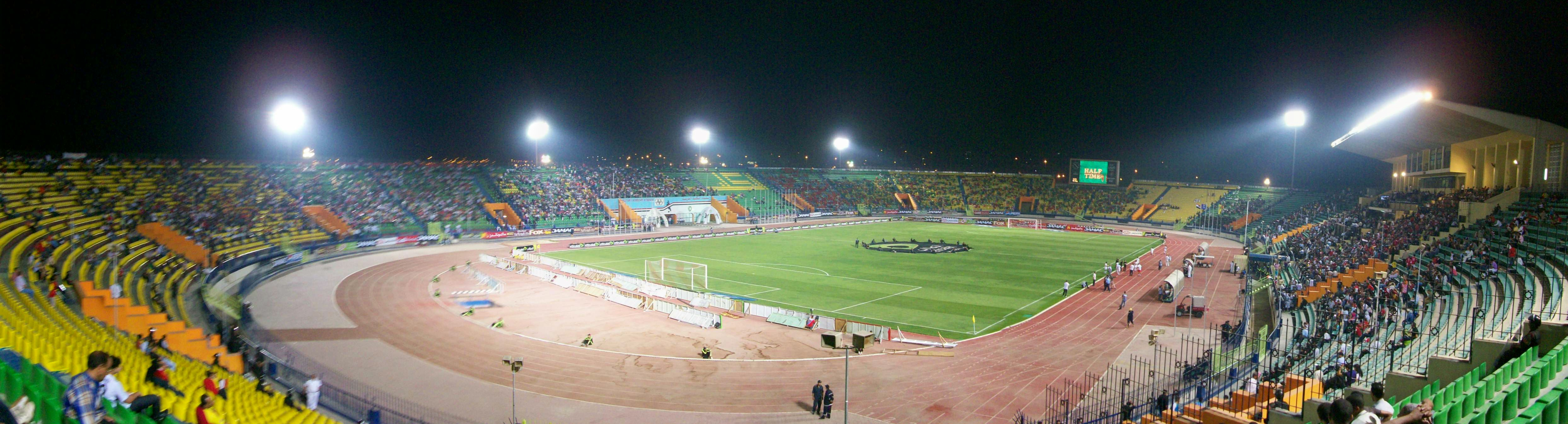
- Host stadium in Cairo
- Dates: 21– 24 November
- Host city: Cairo, Egypt
- Venue: Military Academy Stadium
- Events: 46
- Participation: c. 268 athletes from 20 nations
- Records set: 7 Games records

At the 2007 Pan Arab Games, the athletics events were held at the Military Academy Stadium in Cairo, Egypt from 21 to 24 November. A total of 46 events were contested, of which 23 by male and 23 by female athletes. Morocco was the most successful nation in the competition, taking ten gold medals in a 23-medal haul. Sudan and Tunisia won the second and third greatest number of golds with 8 and 7. The host country, Egypt, achieved six gold medals but also shared the joint highest total medal count with Morocco. Seven Games records were beaten at the 2007 edition of the event.

Amr Ibrahim Mostafa Seoud of Egypt and Gretta Taslakian of Lebanon achieved the 100/200 metres double on the men's and women's sides, respectively. Sudan's Abubaker Kaki Khamis won both the men's 800 metres and 1500 metres, setting a Games record in the latter, and Abdelkader Hachlaf went unbeaten in both the 5000 metres and 3000 m steeplechase. Mona Jabir Adam Ahmed won the heptathlon and 400 m hurdles titles and also won a gold and a silver with Sudan in the women's relays. Her relay team-mate Nawal El Jack also won four medals, having taken the women's 400 metres race and the silver in the 200 m. Fadwa Al Bouza showed multiple talents by winning the women's triple jump and finishing third in the 100 m hurdles.

== Records ==
In addition to the records set by medalling athletes at the 2007 Games, the following records were set by others competing in Cairo:

=== Men ===
Name	Event	Country	Record	Type
Omar Juma Bilal Al-Salfa	200 metres	United Arab Emirates	20.94	NR
Soleiman Salem Ayed; Hatem Mersal; M. Majdi; Amr Ibrahim Mostafa Seoud	4×100 metres relay	Egypt	40.17	NR
?	4×100 metres relay	Jordan	40.38	NR
Key:WR — World record • AR — Area record • GR — Games record • NR — National record

=== Women ===
Name	Event	Country	Record	Type
Alaa Fadhel Al-Saffar	100 metres	Kuwait	12.97	NR
Shaika Al-Dosari	100 metres	Qatar	13.32	NR
Dana Abdul Razak	200 metres	Iraq	24.83	NR
Fatima Abdullah Dahman	200 metres	Yemen	27.53	NR
Fatima Al-Orafi	Half marathon	Yemen	1:48:54	NR
Mouzi Mohd Ali	High jump	Qatar	1.25 m	NR
Rima Taha Farid	Triple jump	Jordan	12.24 m	NR=
Ebtehal Fethi Khalifa Abbud	Javelin throw	Libya	35.53 m	NR
Key:WR — World record • AR — Area record • GR — Games record • NR — National record

== Medal summary ==
=== Men ===
Event	Gold		Silver		Bronze	
100 metres (wind: +0.7 m/s)	Amr Ibrahim Mostafa Seoud (EGY)	10.38 NR	Yahya Al-Gahes (KSA)	10.40	Khalil Al-Hanahneh (JOR)	10.53
200 metres (wind: +2.0 m/s)	Amr Ibrahim Mostafa Seoud (EGY)	20.69	Khalil Al-Hanahneh (JOR)	20.81 NR	Soleiman Salem Ayed (EGY)	20.92
400 metres	Nagmeldin Ali Abubakr (SUD)	46.16	Hamdan Odha Al-Bishi (KSA)	46.50	Ridha Ghali (TUN)	46.77
800 metres	Abubaker Kaki Khamis (SUD)	1:43.90 NR/GR	Mohammed Al-Salhi (KSA)	1:46.64	Saïd Doulal (MAR)	1:48.33
1500 metres	Abubaker Kaki Khamis (SUD)	3:47.92	Mohammed Othman Shaween (KSA)	3:48.49	Abdalla Abdelgadir (SUD)	3:48.97
5000 metres	Abdelkader Hachlaf (MAR)	13:39.75	Sultan Khamis Zaman (QAT)	13:39.79	Hasan Mahboob (BHR)	13:39.93
10,000 metres	Hasan Mahboob (BHR)	29:29.48	Sultan Khamis Zaman (QAT)	29:29.65	Moukheld Al-Outaibi (KSA)	29:29.74
110 m hurdles	Othmane Hadj Lazib (ALG)	14.03	Ali Hussein Al-Zaki (KSA)	14.60	Sami Ahmed Al-Haydar (KSA)	14.60
400 m hurdles	Abderahmane Hammadi (ALG)	50.77	Idriss Abdelaziz Al-Housaoui (KSA)	51.15	Ali Obaid Shirook (UAE)	51.66
3000 m steeplechase	Abdelkader Hachlaf (MAR)	8:39.84	Hamid Ezzine (MAR)	8:42.57	Abubaker Ali Kamal (QAT)	8:43.02
4 × 100 m relay	Saudi Arabia (KSA); Moussa Al-Housaoui; Yahya Al-Gahes; Salem Mubarak Al-Yami; Yahya Hassan Habeeb	39.99	Oman (OMN); Yousuf Darwish Awlad Thani; Juma Mubarak Al-Jabri; Abdullah Said Al-Sooli; Musabeh Al-Masoudi	40.12	Qatar (QAT); Ibrahim Abdulla Al-Waleed; Areef Ibrahim; Sulaiman Hamid Aosman; Hamad Kefah Al-Dosari	40.14
4 × 400 m relay	Saudi Arabia (KSA); Hamed Hamadan Al-Bishi; Hamdan Odha Al-Bishi; Mohammed Al-Salhi; Ismail Al-Sabani	3:04.74	Sudan (SUD); Awadelkarim Makki; Abubaker Kaki; Salih Dar; Nagmeldin Ali Abubakr	3:06.52 NR	Tunisia (TUN); Sofiane Labidi; Ridha Ghali; Mohamed Amin Guezmil; Chouaieb Chelbi	3:06.83
Half marathon	Brahim Beloua (MAR)	1:02:30 GR	Ali Mabrouk El Zaidi (LBA)	1:02:32	Abdulhak Elgorche Zakaria (BHR)	1:03:26
20,000 m track walk	Hassanine Sebei (TUN)	1:36:00.2	Mabrook Saleh Nasser Mohamed (QAT)	1:36:00.2	Mohamed Ameur (ALG)	1:43:35.8
High jump	Salem Al-Anezi (KUW)	2.20 m NR=	Rashid Ahmed Al-Mannai (QAT)	2.17 m	Majed Aldin Ghazal (SYR); Jamal Fakhri Al-Qasim (KSA)	2.14 m
Pole vault	Karim El Mafhoum (MAR)	5.00 m	Abderamane Tamada (TUN)	4.90 m	Sifax Khiari (ALG)	4.80 m
Long jump	Mohamed Salman Al-Khuwalidi (KSA)	8.19 m GR	Hussein Al-Sabee (KSA)	8.10 m	Issam Nima (ALG)	7.98 m
Triple jump	Tarik Bouguetaïb (MAR)	16.46 m	Mohammed Hamdi Awadh (QAT)	16.22 m	Mohamed Youssef Al-Sahabi (BHR)	16.03 m
Shot put	Khalid Habash Al-Suwaidi (QAT)	19.56 m GR	Sultan Al-Hebshi (KSA)	19.53 m	Yasser Ibrahim Farag (EGY)	19.42 m
Discus throw	Sultan Mubarak Al-Dawoodi (KSA)	58.63 m	Ahmed Mohamed Dheeb (QAT)	57.76 m	Yasser Ibrahim Farag (EGY)	57.74 m
Hammer throw	Mohsen El Anany (EGY)	74.22 m GR	Ali Al-Zinkawi (KUW)	74.02 m	Hassan Mohamed Abdel Jawad (EGY)	68.68 m
Javelin throw	Mohamed Ali Kebabou (TUN)	71.41 m	Walid Abdelghani Sayed (EGY)	71.15 m	Mohamed Ibrahim Al-Khalifa (QAT)	69.67 m
Decathlon	Ahmad Hassan Moussa (QAT)	7383 pts	Abdallah Mohamed Saad Hamed (EGY)	7180 pts	Mohamed Ridha Al-Matroud (KSA)	6995 pts

=== Women ===
Event	Gold		Silver		Bronze	
100 metres	Gretta Taslakian (LIB)	12.07	Dana Abdul Razak (IRQ)	12.20	Faten Abdunnari Mahdi (BHR)	12.28
200 metres	Gretta Taslakian (LIB)	23.56 NR/GR	Nawal El Jack (SUD)	24.25	Faten Abdunnari Mahdi (BHR)	24.73
400 metres	Nawal El Jack (SUD)	54.15	Hanane Skhyi (MAR)	55.36	Fayza Omer Jomaa (SUD)	56.90
800 metres	Amina Bakhit (SUD)	2:07.95	Amina Ait Hammou (MAR)	2:08.85	Halima Hachlaf (MAR)	2:09.50
1500 metres	Seltana Ait Hammou (MAR)	4:23.54	Amina Bakhit (SUD)	4:24.74	Sara Yusuf Yaqoob (BHR)	4:24.94
5000 metres	Safa Issaoui (TUN)	19:13.96	Sara Yusuf Yaqoob (BHR)	19:14.50	Hanane Ouhaddou (MAR)	19:14.96
10,000 metres	Nadia Ejjafini (BHR)	32:29.53 GR	Maria Laghrissi (MAR)	34:39.80	Mashaer Ali Abdelradi (SUD)	37:44.72
100 m hurdles	Lamiae Lhabze (MAR)	14.21	Salma Emam Abou El-Hassan (EGY)	14.38 NR	Fadwa Al Bouza (SYR)	14.53
400 m hurdles	Mona Jabir Adam Ahmed (SUD)	56.07	Hanane Skhyi (MAR)	57.31	Houria Moussa (ALG)	58.17
3000 m steeplechase	Hanane Ouhaddou (MAR)	10:30.33	Durka Mana (SUD)	10:49.34	Baraah Awadallah (JOR)	12:02.18
4 × 100 m relay	Morocco (MAR); Fadoua Adili; Lamiae Lhabze; Hanane Skhyi; Fatima Zahra Dkouk	47.42	Sudan (SUD); Amina Bakhit; Gubara Asmal; Nawal El Jack; Mona Jabir Adam Ahmed	47.43 NR	Iraq (IRQ); Dana Abdul Razak; Rasha Abed Yaseen; Alaa Hekmat; Khazaal Al-Sudani Inam	48.20
4 × 400 m relay	Sudan (SUD); Fayza Omer Jomaa; Nawal El Jack; Mona Jabir Adam Ahmed; Amina Bakhit	3:38.56	Morocco (MAR); Lamiae Lhabze; Amina Aït Hammou; Seltana Aït Hammou; Hanane Skhyi	3:44.85	Iraq (IRQ); Dana Abdul Razak; Rasha Abed Yaseen; Alaa Hekmat; Khazaal Al-Sudani Inam	3:54.96
Half marathon	Kareema Jasim (BHR)	1:15:15	Kenza Dahmani (ALG)	1:15:37	Ouafae Frikech (MAR)	1:18:57
10,000 m track walk	Chaima Trabelsi (TUN)	53:52.0	Nagwa Ibrahim Saleh Ali (EGY)	55:14.6	Ghania Amzal (ALG)	56:51.3
High jump	Karima Ben Othmani (TUN)	1.77 m	Yamilé Aldama (SUD)	1.77 m	Rim Hussin Abdallah (EGY)	1.68 m
Pole vault	Leila Ben Youssef (TUN)	3.80 m	Nisrine Dinar (MAR)	3.80 m	Nesrine Ahmed Hassen Emam (EGY)	3.70 m NR
Long jump (No wind info)	Fatima Zahra Dkouk (MAR)	6.16 m	Yamilé Aldama (SUD)	6.05 m	Inas Gharib (EGY)	5.93 m
Triple jump	Fadwa Al Bouza (SYR)	12.61 m	Fatima Zahra Dkouk (MAR)	12.60 m	Camélia Sahnoune (ALG)	12.57 m
Shot put	Wafa Ismail El Baghdadi (EGY)	15.29 m	Wala Mohamed Atia (EGY)	14.60 m	Amel Ben Khaled (TUN)	14.02 m
Discus throw	Monia Kari (TUN)	52.79 m	Heba Abou Meselhi Zachary (EGY)	49.73 m	Sara Sayed Hassib (EGY)	45.26 m
Hammer throw	Marwa Ahmed Hussein (EGY)	62.83 m	Mouna Dani (MAR)	57.36 m	Imane Mohamed Abdelhakim (EGY)	55.40 m
Javelin throw	Hana'a Ramadhan Omar (EGY)	48.28 m	Safa Mohamed Mekkawi (EGY)	45.91 m	Sabiha Mzoughi (TUN)	41.43 m
Heptathlon	Mona Jabir Adam Ahmed (SUD)	4594 pts	Chima Fethi Tehemar (EGY)	4232 pts	Katia Amokrane (ALG)	3637 pts

== Medal table ==
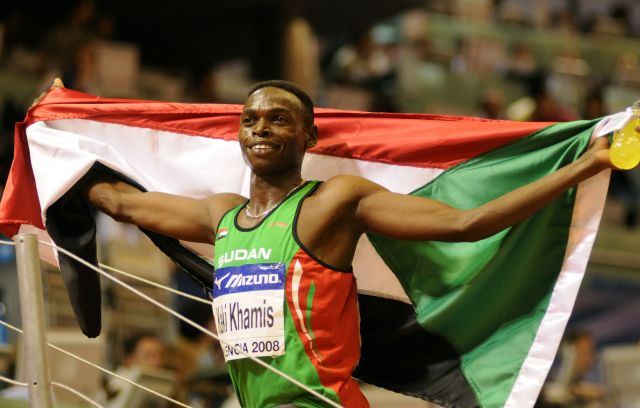
18-year-old Abubaker Kaki's double gold performance was a games highlight

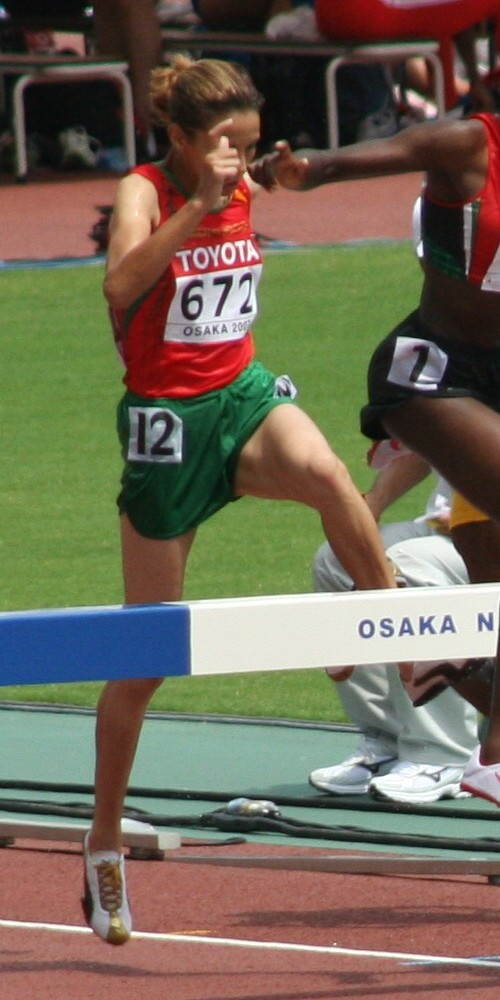
Hanane Ouhaddou's steeplechase gold and 5000 m bronze helped Morocco top the table

* Host nation (Egypt)

Rank	Nation	Gold	Silver	Bronze	Total
1	Morocco	10	9	4	23
2	Sudan	8	7	3	18
3	Tunisia	7	1	4	12
4	Egypt*	6	8	9	23
5	Saudi Arabia	4	8	4	16
6	Bahrain	3	1	6	10
7	Qatar	2	6	3	11
8	Algeria	2	1	7	10
9	Lebanon	2	0	0	2
10	Kuwait	1	1	0	2
11	Syria	1	0	2	3
12	Iraq	0	1	2	3
12	Jordan	0	1	2	3
14	Libya	0	1	0	1
14	Oman	0	1	0	1
16	United Arab Emirates	0	0	1	1
Totals (16 entries)		46	46	47	139

== Participating nations ==
- Algeria (17)
- Bahrain (12)
- Comoros (1)
- Djibouti (2)
- Egypt (31)
- Iraq (6)
- Jordan (10)
- Kuwait (13)
- Lebanon (6)
- Libya (7)
- Mauritania (3)
- Morocco (36)
- Oman (10)
- Qatar (27)
- Saudi Arabia (29)
- Sudan (21)
- Syria (5)
- Tunisia (18)
- United Arab Emirates (11)
- Yemen (3)
