= Sudan at the 2009 World Championships in Athletics =

- WA code: SUD

in Berlin
- Competitors: 9
- Medals: Gold 0 Silver 0 Bronze 0 Total 0

World Championships in Athletics appearances
- 1983; 1987; 1991; 1993; 1995; 1997; 1999; 2001; 2003; 2005; 2007; 2009; 2011; 2013; 2015; 2017; 2019; 2022; 2023; 2025

Sudan competed at the 2009 World Championships in Athletics from 15–23 August. A team of 9 athletes was announced in preparation for the competition. Selected athletes have achieved one of the competition's qualifying standards. The squad includes 800 metres olympic silver medalist Ismail Ahmed Ismail, and 800 metres World Junior champion Abubaker Kaki.

== Team selection ==
Track and road events

Event	Athletes	
Event	Men	Women
400 metres	Rabah Yousif; Nagmeldin Ali Abubakr	Nawal El Jack
400 metres hurdles		Muna Jabir Adam
800 metres	Abubaker Kaki; Ismail Ahmed Ismail	
1500 metres	Abdalla Abdelgadir	
3000 m steeplechase		Durka Mana

Field and combined events

Event	Athletes	
Event	Men	Women
Triple jump		Yamilé Aldama
