= 2011 Asian Athletics Championships – Women's 10,000 metres =

The Women's 10,000 metres event took place on July 7, 2011, at the Kobe Universiade Memorial Stadium.

== Medalists ==
Gold	Shitaye Eshete; Bahrain
Silver	Kareema Saleh Jasim; Bahrain
Bronze	Preeja Sreedharan; India

== Records ==
World record	Wang Junxia (CHN)	29:31.78	Beijing, China	8 September 1993
Asian record	Wang Junxia (CHN)	29:31.78	Beijing, China	8 September 1993
Championship record	Zhong Huandi (CHN)	32:25.27	New Delhi, India	1989

== Results ==
=== Final ===
The race was held at 19:25 local time.

Rank	Name	Nationality	Result	Notes
1st place, gold medalist(s)	Shitaye Eshete	Bahrain	32:47.80	
2nd place, silver medalist(s)	Kareema Saleh Jasim	Bahrain	32:50.70	
3rd place, bronze medalist(s)	Preeja Sreedharan	India	33:15.55	
4	Hitomi Nakamura	Japan	33:16.62	
5	Kaoru Nagao	Japan	33:19.14	
6	Kavita Raut	India	35:24.35	
7	Mahboubeh Ghayournajafabadi	Iran	43:09.30	
