= Abdelkader Hachlaf =

Moroccan runner (born 1978)

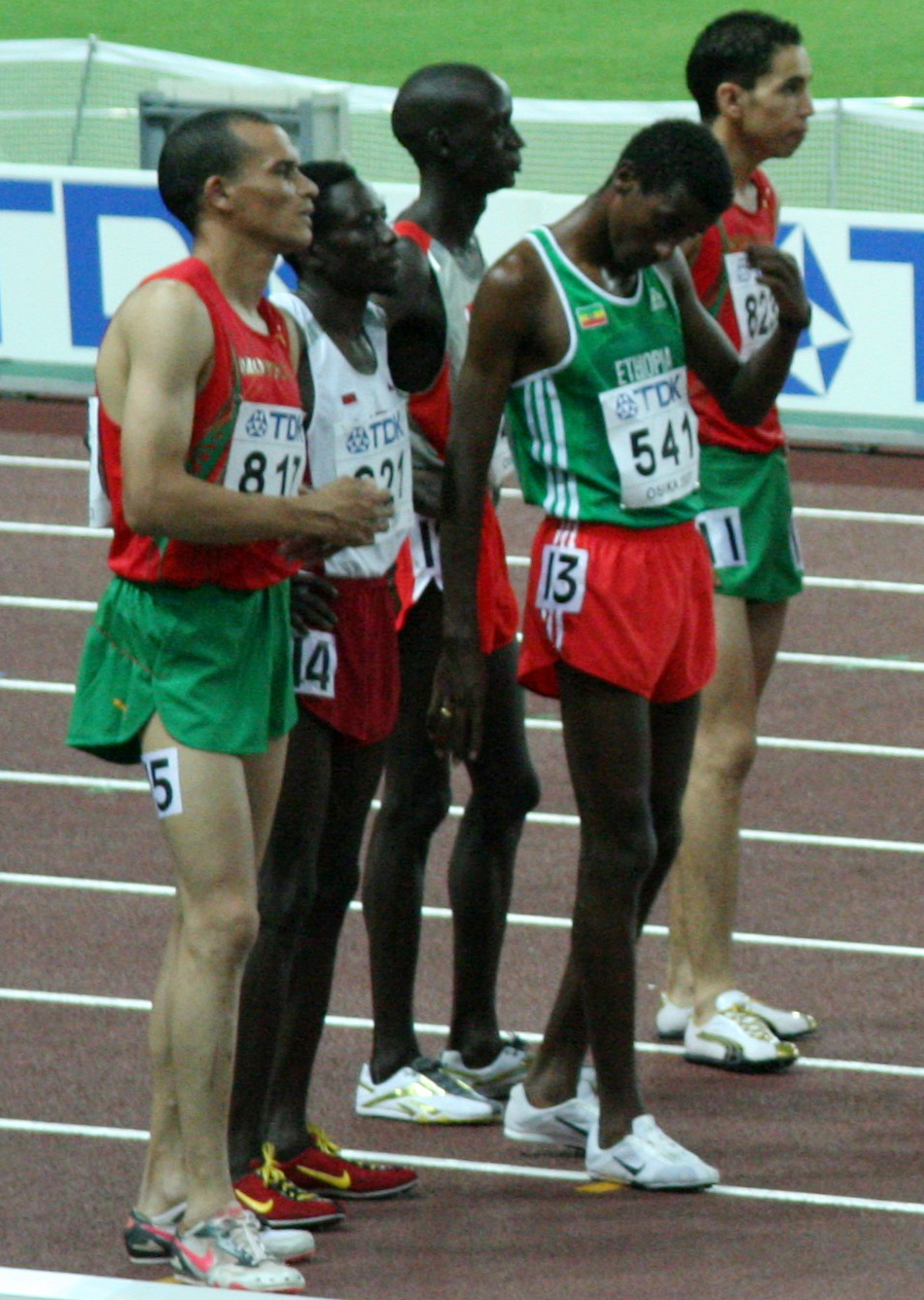
- Hachlaf (first from left) at the 2007 World Championships

Personal information
- Born: 3 August 1978 (age 47) Morocco
- Height: 182 cm (6 ft 0 in)
- Weight: 68 kg (150 lb)
Medal record
Men's athletics
Representing Morocco
African Championships
Silver medal – second place	2006 Bambous	3000 m st.
Bronze medal – third place	2002 Radès	1500 m

Abdelkader Hachlaf (Arabic: عبدالقادر حشلاف, born 3 August 1978) is a Moroccan runner who specializes in the 3000 metres steeplechase.

He was suspended between April 2004 and April 2006 after testing positive for the banned substance nandrolone in an IAAF out-of-competition test.

== Achievements ==
Year	Competition	Venue	Position	Event	Notes
Representing Morocco
2001	Mediterranean Games	Radès, Tunisia	1st	1500 m	
2001	World Championships	Edmonton, Canada	8th	1500 m	
2001	Jeux de la Francophonie	Ottawa, Canada	2nd	1500 m	
2002	African Championships	Radès, Tunisia	3rd	1500 m	
2003	World Indoor Championships	Birmingham, United Kingdom	3rd	1500 m	
2003	African Championships	Lausanne, Switzerland	3rd	Team competition	
2003	World Championships	Paris, France	13th	3000 m st.	
2003	World Athletics Final	Monte Carlo, Monaco	11th	1500 m	
2006	African Championships	Bambous, Mauritius	2nd	3000 m st.	
2006	World Athletics Final	Stuttgart, Germany	8th	3000 m st.	
2007	Pan Arab Games	Cairo, Egypt	1st	5000 m	13:39.75
2007	Pan Arab Games	Cairo, Egypt	1st	3000 m st.	8:39.84

=== Personal bests ===
- 1500 metres – 3:33.59 min (2001)
- 3000 metres – 8:04.88 min (2006)
- 5000 metres – 13:39.75 min (2007)
- 3000 metres steeplechase – 8:08.78 min (2006)

== See also ==
- List of sportspeople sanctioned for doping offences
