= 2006 African Championships in Athletics – Women's 1500 metres =

The women's 1500 metres event at the 2006 African Championships in Athletics was held at the Stade Germain Comarmond on August 11.

== Results ==
Rank	Name	Nationality	Time	Notes
1st place, gold medalist(s)	Nouria Mérah-Benida	Algeria	4:23.26	
2nd place, silver medalist(s)	Safa Issaoui	Tunisia	4:24.08	
3rd place, bronze medalist(s)	Berhane Herpassa	Ethiopia	4:24.09	
4	Saïda El Mehdi	Morocco	4:24.59	
5	Mestewot Tadesse	Ethiopia	4:24.60	
6	Nahida Touhami	Algeria	4:25.25	
7	Beatrice Jepchumba	Kenya	4:29.99	
8	Chanelle Olivier	South Africa	4:31.88	
9	Fatma Lanouar	Tunisia	4:34.30	
10	Clémentine Nyiraguhirwa	Rwanda	4:40.13	
11	Natasha Monique	Mauritius	4:45.23	
12	Rabecca Nachula	Zambia	4:47.06	
13	Tawa Adedigba	Nigeria	4:47.92	
14	Inusah Mitchell	Ghana	4:48.05	
15	Cyriaque Tabaria Ngotar	Chad	4:57.47	
	Millicent Boadi	Ghana	DNF	
	Maria Mutola	Mozambique	DNS	
	Dorothée Ndihokudwayo	Burundi	DNS	
