= Fadwa Al-Bouza =

Syrian hurdler and heptathlete

Personal information
- Nationality: Syrian
- Born: 14 January 1990 (age 36) Homs, Syria
- Height: 1.73 m (5 ft 8 in)
- Weight: 58 kg (128 lb)

Sport
- Country: Syria
- Sport: Athletics
- Event(s): 100m Hurdles, Triple jump, Long jump, Heptathlon
- Club: Al-Karamah SC (SYR)
- Coached by: Ibrahim Al-Boza
Medal record
Representing Syria
West Asian Games
Silver medal – second place	2005 Doha	Long jump
West Asian Championships
Gold medal – first place	2010 Aleppo	100 m hurdles
Gold medal – first place	2010 Aleppo	Triple jump
Bronze medal – third place	2010 Aleppo	4×100 relay
Pan Arab Games
Gold medal – first place	2007 Cairo	Triple jump
Bronze medal – third place	2007 Cairo	100 m hurdles
Arab Championships
Silver medal – second place	2005 Radès	100 m hurdles
Silver medal – second place	2005 Radès	4×100 relay
Silver medal – second place	2005 Radès	4×400 relay
Silver medal – second place	2005 Radès	Heptathlon
Silver medal – second place	2007 Amman	100 m hurdles
Silver medal – second place	2007 Amman	Heptathlon
Silver medal – second place	2009 Damascus	100 m hurdles
Bronze medal – third place	2003 Amman	4×400 relay
Bronze medal – third place	2009 Damascus	Triple jump

Fadwa Al-Bouza (Arabic: فدوى البوظة; born January 14, 1990) is a former female Syrian heptathlete and hurdler. She represented Syria at the 2008 Summer Olympics in Beijing, and competed in the women's 100 m hurdles. Al-Bouza ran in the second heat, where she finished in eighth place with a time of 14.24 seconds, and subsequently, did not advance into the later rounds.

At the 2009 Arab Athletics Championships in Damascus, Bouza set both a national record and a personal best time of 13.01, by finishing third in the final of the women's triple jump.

== Personal bests ==
Outdoor

- 100 metres hurdles: 14.00 NU20R (2008)
- Long jump: 5.85 m (2007)
- Triple jump: 13.01 m NR (2009)
- High jump: 1.45 m (2005)
- 200 m: 26.01 (2005)
- Shot put: 8.89 m (2005)
- Javelin throw: 26.10 m (2005)
- 800 m: 2:36.18 min (2005)
- Heptathlon: 4555 pts (2005)

Indoor

- 800 m: 2:40.00 (2006)
- 60 metres hurdles: 8.85 NiR (2005)
- High jump: 1.52 (2006)
- Long Jump: 5.58 NiR (2005)
- Triple jump: 12.47 (2009)
- Pentathlon: 3251 pts NiR (2006)

== Competition record ==
Year	Competition	Venue	Position	Event	Notes
Representing Syria
2003	Arab Championships	Amman, Jordan	3rd	4×400 m relay	4:00.10
2004	Arab Junior Championships	Damascus, Syria	1st	Heptathlon	4345 pts
2005	World Youth Championships	Marrakesh, Morocco	5th (q)	100 m hurdles	14.31
2005	World Youth Championships	Marrakesh, Morocco	24th	Heptathlon	4476 pts
2005	Asian Championships	Incheon, South Korea	11th (q)	100 m hurdles	14.31
2005	Asian Championships	Incheon, South Korea	12th	Long jump	5.52
2005	Arab Championships	Radès, Tunisia	2nd	100 m hurdles	14.38
2005	Arab Championships	Radès, Tunisia	2nd	4×100 m relay	48.35
2005	Arab Championships	Radès, Tunisia	2nd	4×400 m relay	3:49.75
2005	Arab Championships	Radès, Tunisia	2nd	Heptathlon	4550 pts
2005	Women's Islamic Games	Tehran, Iran	3rd	60 m hurdles	8.85
2005	Women's Islamic Games	Tehran, Iran	2nd	Long jump	5.58
2005	Women's Islamic Games	Tehran, Iran	1st	Pentathlon	3171 pts
2005	West Asian Games	Doha, Qatar	2nd	Long jump	5.76
2006	Asian Indoor Championships	Pattaya, Thailand	7th	60 m hurdles	8.94
2006	Asian Indoor Championships	Pattaya, Thailand	6th	Pentathlon	3251 pts
2006	Asian Junior Championships	Macau, China	5th	Long jump	5.50
2006	Asian Games	Doha, Qatar	8th	100 m hurdles	14.69
2006	Asian Games	Doha, Qatar	8th	Long jump	11.97
2006	Arab Junior Championships	Cairo, Egypt	2nd	100 m hurdles	14.66
2006	Arab Junior Championships	Cairo, Egypt	3rd	4×100 m relay	50.51
2006	Arab Junior Championships	Cairo, Egypt	3rd	4×400 m relay	4:06.43
2006	Arab Junior Championships	Cairo, Egypt	3rd	Long jump	5.58
2006	Arab Junior Championships	Cairo, Egypt	1st	Triple jump	12.54
2007	Arab Championships	Amman, Jordan	2nd	100 m hurdles	14.01
2007	Arab Championships	Amman, Jordan	2nd	Heptathlon	4211 pts
2007	Asian Championships	Amman, Jordan	6th	100 m hurdles	14.31
2007	Asian Championships	Amman, Jordan	5th	Triple jump	12.79
2007	Pan Arab Games	Cairo, Egypt	3rd	100 m hurdles	14.53
2007	Pan Arab Games	Cairo, Egypt	1st	Triple jump	12.61
2008	Asian Indoor Championships	Doha, Qatar	4th	Long jump	5.56
2008	Asian Indoor Championships	Doha, Qatar	6th	Long jump	12.14
2008	World Indoor Championships	Valencia, Spain	26th	60 m hurdles	9.06
2008	Olympic Games	Beijing, China	38th (q)	100 m hurdles	14.24
2009	Arab Championships	Damascus, Syria	2nd	100 m hurdles	14.28
2009	Arab Championships	Damascus, Syria	4th	4×100 m relay	50.42
2009	Arab Championships	Damascus, Syria	5th	4×400 m relay	4:11.80
2009	Arab Championships	Damascus, Syria	3rd	Triple jump	13.01 NR
2009	Asian Indoor Games	Hanoi, Vietnam	11th	Triple jump	12.47
2009	Asian Championships	Guangzhou, China	6th	Triple jump	12.75
2010	West Asian Championships	Aleppo, Syria	1st	100 m hurdles	14.91
2010	West Asian Championships	Aleppo, Syria	1st	Triple jump	12.29
2010	West Asian Championships	Aleppo, Syria	3rd	4×100 m relay	50.80
