= List of Egyptian records in athletics =

The following are the national records in athletics in Egypt maintained by the Egyptian Athletic Federation (EAF).

== Outdoor ==
Key to tables: Awaiting ratification Record not kept by EAF Not ratified or later rescinded by EAF

=== Men ===
Event	Record	Athlete	Date	Meet	Place	Ref.
100 m	10.13 (+1.8 m/s)	Amr Ibrahim Mostafa Seoud	12 September 2011	All-Africa Games	Maputo, Mozambique	
200 m	20.36 A (+1.3 m/s)	Amr Ibrahim Mostafa Seoud	1 August 2010	African Championships	Nairobi, Kenya	
400 m	45.40	Anas Beshr	11 June 2016	Star Athletics Pro Meet	Montverde, United States	
800 m	1:44.92	Hamada Mohamed	14 July 2017	Meeting de Atletismo Madrid	Madrid, Spain	
1500 m	3:38.16	Hamada Mohamed	29 July 2011	DN Galan	Stockholm, Sweden	
3000 m	8:05.05	Hamada Mohamed	24 July 2011		Gävle, Sweden	
5000 m	13:58.92	Salem Mohamed Attiaallah	15 March 2017		Cairo, Egypt	
5000 m	13:53.03	Salem Mohamed Attiaallah	14 September 2022	Egyptian Championships	Maadi, Egypt	
10,000 m	29:20.91	Muharram Hamedallah Mohamad	16 March 2017		Cairo, Egypt	
Half marathon	1:05:34	Abdul Ahmed Al Mawgood	3 October 1999	World Half Marathon Championships	Palermo, Italy	
Half marathon	1:04:03	Salem Mohamed Attiaallah	10 March 2023	Cairo Half Marathon	Cairo, Egypt	
Marathon	2:19:39	Aissa Reza Abou Raif	25 December 1997		Al Arish, Egypt	
110 m hurdles	13.89 (+1.7 m/s)	Yousuf Badawy Sayed	24 December 2021 (Note: by World Athletics Athlete Profile source, 25 December 2021 by World Athletics statistic handbook)	Egyptian Championships	Maadi, Egypt	
110 m hurdles	13.71 (+1.0 m/s)	Youssef Badawy Sayed	21 May 2023	1st Arab U23 Championships	Radès, Tunisia	
400 m hurdles	49.74	Ahmed Ghanem	12 August 1985		Cairo, Egypt	
3000 m steeplechase	8:28.87	Salem Mohamed Attiaallah	17 July 2019	Míting Internacional d´Atletisme Ciutat de Barcelona	Barcelona, Spain	
3000 m steeplechase	8:21.55	Salem Mohamed Attiaallah	28 June 2024	Luxembourg Championships	Luxembourg City, Luxembourg	
High jump	2.25 m	Karim Samir Lotfy	27 June 2008	Internationales Hochsprung-Meeting Eberstadt	Eberstadt, Germany	
Pole vault	5.05 m	Ahmed Hosni Abou Zid	26 August 1995		Cairo, Egypt	
Pole vault	5.20 m	Tamer Ashraf	21 June 2023	Arab Championships	Marrakech, Morocco	
Long jump	8.31 m (+0.1 m/s)	Hatem Mersal	30 June 1999	Bislett Games	Oslo, Norway	
Triple jump	16.24 m	Nour Salaheddine Noureddine	11 April 2008		Maadi, Egypt	
Shot put	21.31 m	Mostafa Amr Hassan	15 April 2017	Mt. SAC Relays	Torrance, United States	
Shot put	21.65 m	Mostafa Amr Hassan	16 March 2023	Challenge Meeting	Cairo, Egypt	
Discus throw	66.58 m	Omar Ahmed El Ghazaly	28 June 2007		Helsingborg, Sweden	
Hammer throw	81.27 m	Mostafa Al-Gamel	21 March 2014		Cairo, Egypt	
Javelin throw	89.21 m	Ihab Abdelrahman El Sayed	18 May 2014	Shanghai Golden Grand Prix	Shanghai, China	
Decathlon	7472 pts	Mustapha Taha Hussein	1–2 May 2002		Cairo, Egypt	
Decathlon	100m (wind) / Long jump (wind) / Shot put / High jump / 400m / 110m H (wind) / Discus / Pole vault / Javelin / 1500m; 10.96 / 7.17 m / 13.35 m / 1.81 m / 49.18 / 15.17 / 45.08 m / 4.40 m / 49.27 m / 4:42.56					
10 km walk (road)	41:25+	Mohamed Ragab Saleh	4 May 2014	IAAF World Race Walking Cup	Taicang, China	
15 km walk (road)	1:04:29+	Mohamed Ragab Saleh	4 May 2014	IAAF World Race Walking Cup	Taicang, China	
20 km walk (road)	1:23:15	Mohamed Ragab Saleh	5 April 2019	Arab Championships	Cairo, Egypt	
50 km walk (road)	4:22:04	Ahmed Drifalla Mohamed	19 March 2016	Dudinská Päťdesiatka	Dudince, Slovakia	
4 × 100 m relay	40.17	Egypt; Soleiman Salem Ayed; Hatem Mersal; M. Majdi; Amr Ibrahim Mostafa Seoud	23 November 2007	Pan Arab Games	Cairo, Egypt	
4 × 400 m relay	3:08.18	Egypt; Nafi Ahmed Mersal; Ahmed Abdelhalim Ghanem; Rafik Abdel Rahab; H.K. Ahmed	12 August 1985		Cairo, Egypt	

=== Women ===
Event	Record	Athlete	Date	Meet	Place	Ref.
100 m	11.02 A (−0.4 m/s)	Basant Hemida	7 May 2022	Kip Keino Classic	Nairobi, Kenya	
200 m	22.41 (+1.4 m/s)	Basant Hemida	4 June 2023	Fanny Blankers-Koen Games	Hengelo, Netherlands	
300 m	35.94	Bassant Hemida	9 August 2025	Mityng Ambasadorów Białostockiego Sportu	Białystok, Poland	
400 m	50.10	Basant Hemida	21 June 2026	FBK Games	Hengelo, Netherlands	
800 m	2:07.7 h	Wala Mohamed Ahmed	6 April 2007		Maadi, Egypt	
1000 m	2:49.96	Shahd Mohamed Abdo	5 May 2021		Maadi, Egypt	
1500 m	4:27.05	Shahd Mohamed Abdo	9 December 2021		Maadi, Egypt	
3000 m	9:39.12	Malak Abdelghany Abdalla Ibrahim	26 April 2026	Arab U20 Championships	Radès, Tunisia	
5000 m	17:12.2 h	Sarah Ahmed Abou Hassan	12 September 2004		Damascus, Syria	
5000 m	17:04.15	Shahd Mohamed Abdo	14 September 2022	Egyptian Championships	Maadi, Egypt	
10,000 m	36:17.1 h	Sarah Ahmed Abou Hassan	5 April 2007		Maadi, Egypt	
10 km (road)	39:49+	Nesma Abde	24 March 2018	World Half Marathon Championships	Valencia, Spain	
15 km (road)	1:01:23+	Nesma Abde	24 March 2018	World Half Marathon Championships	Valencia, Spain	
20 km (road)	1:22:28+	Nesma Abde	24 March 2018	World Half Marathon Championships	Valencia, Spain	
Half marathon	1:26:52 Wo	Nesma Abde	24 March 2018	World Half Marathon Championships	Valencia, Spain	
Half marathon	1:24:03 Mx	Nevine Nour	1 October 2023	Al Sahel Half Marathon	Dubai, United Arab Emirates	
25 km (road)	1:44:14+ Mx	Yasmine Mansour	27 September 2026	Berlin Marathon	Berlin, Germany	
30 km (road)	2:05:52+ Mx	Yasmine Mansour	27 September 2026	Berlin Marathon	Berlin, Germany	
Marathon	3:00:57 Mx (Note: Brutto timing ("Gun time"); Netto timing was 2:59:19)	Yasmine Mansour	27 September 2026	Berlin Marathon	Berlin, Germany	
100 m hurdles	13.64 (+1.3 m/s)	Lina Amr Jaber Ahmed	22 July 2016	World U20 Championships	Bydgoszcz, Poland	
400 m hurdles	1:01.43	Nourine Hassan Mahmoud	26 April 2015		Réduit, Mauritius	
2000 m steeplechase	6:47.49	Malak Abdelghany Abdalla Ibrahim	24 April 2025	Egyptian U18 Championships	Ismailia, Egypt	
3000 m steeplechase	10:04.52	Malak Abdelghany Abdalla Ibrahim	7 August 2026	World U20 Championships	Eugene, United States	
High jump	1.82 m	Basant Mosaad Mohamed Hassan	13 April 2016	Egyptian Championships	Cairo, Egypt	
Pole vault	3.80 m	Nesrine Ahmed Hasan Eman	8 October 2009		Damascus, Syria	
Long jump	6.15 m	Mouna Sabri Mahmoud	20 June 2002		Blida, Algeria	
Long jump	6.75 m	Esraa Mohamed Samir Owis	14 September 2022		Cairo, Egypt	
Triple jump	13.24 m NWI	Asmaa Mohamed Gherib	6 October 2016		Kuwait City, Kuwait	
Triple jump	13.24 m NWI	Asmaa Mohamed Gherib	16 March 2017		Cairo, Egypt	
Triple jump	13.57 m (+0.6 m/s)	Esraa Owis Mohamed Samir	7 July 2023	Arab Games	Oran, Algeria	
Shot put	16.50 m	Hanaa Salah El-Melegi	20 June 2000		Cairo, Egypt	
Discus throw	53.88 m	Hiba Abou Meselhi	18 April 2001		Maadi, Egypt	
Hammer throw	68.48 m	Marwa Hussein	18 February 2005		Cairo, Egypt	
Javelin throw	60.97 m	Aseel Osama Abdel Hamid	16 May 2026	African Championships	Accra, Ghana	
Heptathlon	5555 pts	Houda Mohamed Atef	24–25 June 2016	African Championships	Durban, South Africa	
Heptathlon	100m H (wind) / High jump / Shot put / 200m (wind) / Long jump (wind) / Javelin / 800m; 14.01 (+1.4) / 1.68m / 11.99m / 25.40 (nw) / 5.97m (+0.6) / 40.60m / 2:27.90					
10,000 m walk (track)	47:05.00	Mona Ali Mohamed	30 August 2024	World U20 Championships	Lima, Peru	
10 km walk (road)	57:07	Jihad Adel Musharef	28 October 2011	Pan Arabic Championships	Al-Ain, United Arab Emirates	
20 km walk (road)	1:41:08	Nagwa Ibrahim Ali	12 October 2002		Turin, Italy	
4 × 100 m relay	46.79	Egypt; Karima Meskin Saad; Wafa Bashir; Huda Hashem Ismail; Muna Mohamed Mansour	6 October 1990	African Championships	Cairo, Egypt	
4 × 100 m relay	46.62	Egypt; Maram Mahmoud Ahmed; Lina Amr Gaber Ahmed; Esraa Owis; Asmaa Mohamed Gherib	23 June 2023	Arab Championships	Marrakech, Morocco	
4 × 400 m relay	3:50.19	Egypt; Safa Mahmoud Ali; Fawzia Kheir; Hala Sedqi Ali; Eman Abdelmotaleb	8 April 2019	Arab Championships	Cairo, Egypt	

== Indoor ==
=== Men ===
Event	Record	Athlete	Date	Meet	Place	Ref.
60 m	6.69	Amr Ibrahim Mostafa Seoud	7 March 2008	World Championships	Valencia, Spain	
200 m						
400 m	48.25	Ahmed Abdelhalim Ghanem	6 March 1987	World Championships	Indianapolis, United States	
600 m	1:17.03	Hazem Miawad	4 February 2024	New Balance Indoor Grand Prix	Boston, United States	
800 m	1:47.65	Hamada Mohamed	2 March 2018	World Championships	Birmingham, United Kingdom	
1500 m	3:50.05	Ahmed Mohammed Fahmy	31 January 1987		Piraeus, Greece	
3000 m						
60 m hurdles	8.09	Mohammed Samy	11 March 1995	World Championships	Barcelona, Spain	
60 m hurdles	7.71	Yousuf Badawy Sayed	7 February 2025	INIT Indoor Meeting Karlsruhe	Karlsruhe, Germany	
High jump	2.24 m	Karim Samir Lotfy	29 February 2008		Chemnitz, Germany	
Pole vault	4.60 m	Ahmed Attallah	27 January 2018	Illini Classic	Champaign, United States	
Long jump	7.69 m	Mohamed Fathalla	27 January 2011	Erdgas Hallenmeeting	Chemnitz, Germany	
Triple jump	16.00 m	Hesham Eldesouky	23 February 2019	Mid-American Championships	Kent, United States	
Shot put	21.30 m A	Mostafa Amr Hassan	25 February 2017	Mountain West Championships	Albuquerque, United States	
Discus throw	63.37 m	Yasser Fathy	27 March 2010	Wexiö Indoor Throwing Competition	Växjö, Sweden	
Heptathlon						
Heptathlon	60m / Long jump / Shot put / High jump / 60m H / Pole vault / 1000m					
5000 m walk						
4 × 400 m relay						

=== Women ===
Event	Record	Athlete	Date	Meet	Place	Ref.
60 m	7.31	Basant Hemida	18 March 2022	World Championships	Belgrade, Serbia	
200 m						
400 m	51.72	Basant Hemida	3 February 2026	Czech Indoor Gala	Ostrava, Czech Republic	
800 m						
1500 m						
3000 m						
60 m hurdles						
High jump						
Pole vault	4.00 m	Donia Ahmed El-Tabagh	8 February 2020		Nantes, France	
Long jump						
Triple jump						
Shot put	15.05 m	Hanane Ahmed Khaled	5 March 1989	World Championships	Budapest, United States	
Pentathlon						
Pentathlon	60m H / High jump / Shot put / Long jump / 800m					
3000 m walk						
4 × 400 m relay						
