= Nouria Mérah-Benida =

Algerian middle-distance runner

Personal information
- Born: 19 October 1970 (age 55) Algiers, Algeria
Medal record
Women's athletics
Representing Algeria
Olympic Games
Gold medal – first place	2000 Sydney	1500 m
African Championships
Gold medal – first place	2000 Algiers	1500 m
Gold medal – first place	2006 Bambous	1500 m
Silver medal – second place	2000 Algiers	800 m
Bronze medal – third place	2006 Bambous	800 m
Mediterranean Games
Gold medal – first place	1997 Bari	1500 m

Nouria Merah-Benida (Arabic: نورية مراح بنيدة; born 19 October 1970) is an Algerian former middle-distance runner.

At the 1999 All-Africa Games in Johannesburg, Merah-Benida won silver medals in both 800 metres and 1,500 metres. At the 2000 Summer Olympics in Sydney she won an unexpected gold medal ahead of Romanians Violeta Szekely (silver) and Gabriela Szabo (bronze). The same year, she won an 800 m silver medal and a 1,500 m gold medal at the African Championships. She retired after the 2001 season.

== Competition record ==
Year	Competition	Venue	Position	Event	Notes
Representing Algeria
1996	Olympic Games	Atlanta, United States	23rd (h)	800 m	2:02.44
1997	Mediterranean Games	Bari, Italy	1st	1500 m	4:11.27
1997	World Championships	Athens, Greece	11th (sf)	800 m	2:01.08
1997	World Championships	Athens, Greece	29th (h)	1500 m	4:12.21
1999	World Indoor Championships	Maebashi, Japan	10th (sf)	800 m	2:03.10
1999	World Championships	Seville, Spain	19th (h)	1500 m	4:08.90
1999	All-Africa Games	Johannesburg, South Africa	2nd	800 m	2:00.83
1999	All-Africa Games	Johannesburg, South Africa	2nd	1500 m	4:18.69
2000	African Championships	Algiers, Algeria	2nd	800 m	1:59.73
2000	African Championships	Algiers, Algeria	1st	1500 m	4:16.14
2000	Olympic Games	Sydney, Australia	1st	1500 m	4:05.10
2001	World Championships	Edmonton, Canada	24th (h)	1500 m	4:15.06
2006	African Championships	Bambous, Mauritius	3rd	800 m	2:02.18
2006	African Championships	Bambous, Mauritius	1st	1500 m	4:23.26
