= 2004 World Junior Championships in Athletics – Women's 3000 metres =

The women's 3000 metres event at the 2004 World Junior Championships in Athletics was held in Grosseto, Italy, at Stadio Olimpico Carlo Zecchini on 17 July.

== Medalists ==
Gold	Jebichi Yator; Kenya
Silver	Safa Aissaoui; Tunisia
Bronze	Siham Hilali; Morocco

== Results ==
=== Final ===
17 July

Rank	Name	Nationality	Time	Notes
1st place, gold medalist(s)	Jebichi Yator	Kenya	8:59.80	
2nd place, silver medalist(s)	Safa Aissaoui	Tunisia	9:02.47	
3rd place, bronze medalist(s)	Siham Hilali	Morocco	9:03.16	
4	Tomomi Yuda	Japan	9:13.69	
5	Gladys Chemweno	Kenya	9:13.92	
6	Laura Kenney	United Kingdom	9:24.62	
7	Adrienne Herzog	Netherlands	9:32.33	
8	Hind Musa	Sudan	9:35.56	
9	Francine Niyonizigiye	Burundi	9:39.17	
10	Azra Eminovic	Serbia and Montenegro	9:39.50	
11	Inés Melchor	Peru	9:41.89	
12	Aurora Ermini	Italy	9:49.47	
13	Christine Kalmer	South Africa	9:52.37	
14	Jasminka Guber	Bosnia and Herzegovina	10:04.30	
	Susan Kuijken	Netherlands	DNF	

== Participation ==
According to an unofficial count, 15 athletes from 13 countries participated in the event.

- Bosnia and Herzegovina (1)
- Burundi (1)
- Italy (1)
- Japan (1)
- Kenya (2)
- Morocco (1)
- Netherlands (2)
- Peru (1)
- Serbia and Montenegro (1)
- South Africa (1)
- Sudan (1)
- Tunisia (1)
- United Kingdom (1)
