= Hanane Ouhaddou =

Moroccan runner (born 1982)

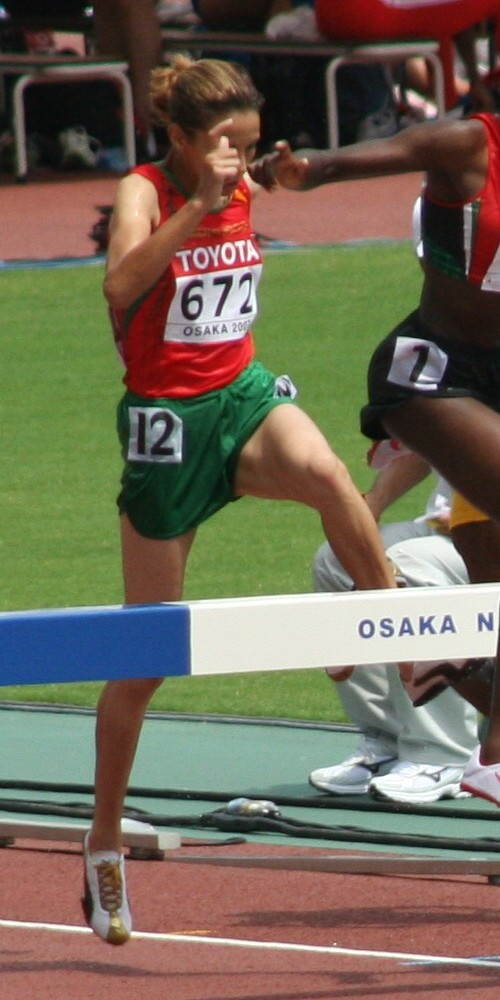
Hanane Ouhaddou

Hanane Ouhaddou (born 1982) is a Moroccan runner who specializes in the 3000 metres steeplechase. She finished fifth in at the 2006 African Championships and ninth at the 2007 World Championships.

She served a doping ban between 2012 and 2014 for doping. In 2016 she was banned from competition again for eight years for refusing to get tested. The ban is set to end on 10 May 2024.

Her personal best time is 9:25.51 minutes, achieved in July 2007 in Heusden-Zolder.

== Achievements ==
Year	Competition	Venue	Position	Event	Notes
Representing Morocco
2001	Jeux de la Francophonie	Ottawa, Canada	11th	1500m	4:29.75
2006	African Championships	Bambous, Mauritius	5th	3000m s'chase	10:18.38
2007	World Cross Country Championships	Mombasa, Kenya	33rd	Long race	Individual
2007	World Cross Country Championships	Mombasa, Kenya	3rd	Long race	Team
2007	World Championships	Osaka, Japan	9th	3000m s'chase	9:37.87
2007	Pan Arab Games	Cairo, Egypt	3rd	5000m	19:14.96
2007	Pan Arab Games	Cairo, Egypt	1st	3000m s'chase	10:30.33
2008	World Indoor Championships	Valencia, Spain	14th (h)	3000m	9:03.41
2008	Olympic Games	Beijing, China	40th (h)	3000m s'chase	9:56.41
2009	World Championships	Berlin, Germany	20th (h)	3000m s'chase	9:35.78
2009	Mediterranean Games	Pescara, Italy	1st	5000m	15:12.75
2009	Jeux de la Francophonie	Beirut, Lebanon	2nd	5000m	16:27.51
2009	Jeux de la Francophonie	Beirut, Lebanon	2nd	3000m s'chase	10:07.40
2010	African Championships	Nairobi, Kenya	5th	3000m s'chase	9:43.13
2011	World Championships	Daegu, South Korea	8th	3000m s'chase	9:32.36
2011	Pan Arab Games	Doha, Qatar	4th	5000m	16:19.64
2015	World Championships	Beijing, China	—	3000 m s'chase	DQ
