= Fatima Dahman =

Yemeni sprinter (born 1992)

Fatima Sulaiman Dahman (born November 10, 1992, in Taiz) is a Yemeni sprinter. She competed in the 100 metres competition at the 2012 Summer Olympics; she ran the preliminaries in 13.95 seconds, which did not qualify her for Round 1.
