= Salem Mohamed Attiaallah =

Egyptian runner

Personal information
- Born: 1 October 1993 (age 32)

Sport
- Country: Egypt
- Events: 3000 metres steeplechase; Long-distance running

Salem Mohamed Attiaallah (born 1 October 1993) is an Egyptian track and field athlete who specializes in the 3000 metres steeplechase. In 2019, he competed in the men's 3000 metres steeplechase at the 2019 World Athletics Championships held in Doha, Qatar. He did not qualify to compete in the final.

== Career ==
In 2018, he competed in the men's half marathon at the 2018 IAAF World Half Marathon Championships held in Valencia, Spain. He finished in 120th place.

In 2019, he represented Egypt at the 2019 African Games held in Rabat, Morocco. He competed in the men's 3000 metres steeplechase and he finished in 7th place.
