= Sudan at the 1983 World Championships in Athletics =

- Flag of Sudan
- WA code: SUD

in Helsinki, Finland August 7–14, 1983
- Competitors: 4 (4 men) in 5 events
- Medals: Gold 0 Silver 0 Bronze 0 Total 0

World Championships in Athletics appearances
- 1983; 1987; 1991; 1993; 1995; 1997; 1999; 2001; 2003; 2005; 2007; 2009; 2011; 2013; 2015; 2017; 2019; 2022; 2023

Sudan competed at the 1983 World Championships in Athletics in Helsinki, Finland, from August 7 to 14, 1983.

== Men ==
Track and road events

Athlete	Event	Heat		Quarterfinal		Semifinal		Final	
Athlete	Event	Result	Rank	Result	Rank	Result	Rank	Result	Rank
Hassan El Kashief	400 metres	46.61	15 Q	Did not finish		Did not advance			
Omer Khalifa	800 metres	1:49.67	41	—		Did not advance			
Omer Khalifa	1500 metres	3:48.23	41	—		Did not advance			
Ahmed Musa Jouda	10,000 metres	28:38.03	24	—		Did not advance			

Field events

Athlete	Event	Qualification		Final	
Athlete	Event	Distance	Position	Distance	Position
Joseph Rajo	High jump	DNS		Did not advance	
