= Sudan at the 2022 World Athletics Championships =

- Flag of Sudan
- WA code: SUD

in Eugene, United States July 15, 2022 – July 24, 2022
- Competitors: 1 (1 man)
- Medals: Gold 0 Silver 0 Bronze 0 Total 0

World Athletics Championships appearances
- 1983; 1987; 1991; 1993; 1995; 1997; 1999; 2001; 2003; 2005; 2007; 2009; 2011; 2013; 2015; 2017; 2019; 2022; 2023

Sudan competed at the 2022 World Athletics Championships in Eugene, United States, from July 15 to 24, 2022.

== Results ==
Sudan entered 1 athlete.

Key

- Q = Qualified for the next round
- q = Qualified for the next round as a fastest loser or, in field events, by position without achieving the qualifying target
- NR = National record
- PB = Personal best
- SB = Season best
- N/A = Round not applicable for the event

=== Men ===
Track and road events

Athlete	Event	Heat		Final	
Athlete	Event	Result	Rank	Result	Rank
Yaseen Abdalla	5000 m	14:15.59	38	Did not advance	
