= Nadia Ejjafini =

Moroccan-Italian long-distance runner (born 1977)

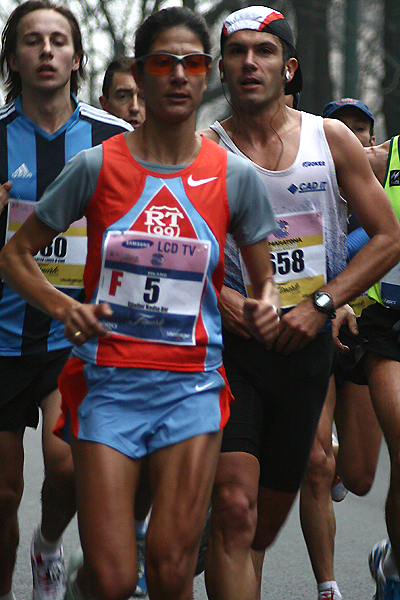
- Nadia Ejjafini (#5) at the 2007 Milan Marathon.

Personal information
- Nationality: Italian
- Born: 8 November 1977 (age 48) Rabat, Morocco
- Height: 1.68 m (5 ft 6 in)
- Weight: 51 kg (112 lb)

Sport
- Country: Italy
- Sport: Athletics
- Event: Long distance running
- Club: C.S. Esercito
- Coached by: Andrea Bello

Achievements and titles
- Personal bests: 5000 m: 15:16.54 (2012); 10000 m: 31:45.14 (2012); Half marathon: 1:08:27 (2011); Marathon: 2:26:15 (2011)
Medal record
Event	1st	2nd	3rd
Pan Arab Games	2	0	1

Nadia Ejjafini (born 8 November 1977) is a Moroccan-born professional long-distance runner. She switched nationality from her birth country to Bahrain in 2003, and later became an Italian citizen by marriage in 2009.

== Biography ==
She finished fourth in the 5000 metres at the 1998 World Junior Championships. She won the half marathon race at the 1999 Pan Arab Games, at the time representing Morocco. She won the Giro di Castelbuono race in 2002.

Ejjafini competed at the World Cross Country Championships in 2003 and 2004 and in the marathon at the World Championships in 2003 and 2005. She also competed in the marathon at the 2004 and 2008 Summer Olympics, but did not finish on either attempt. She was fourth over 5000 m at the 2006 Asian Games.

She enjoyed much success on the road circuit in 2006: she won the Tilburg Ten Miles, Diecimiglia del Garda, Parelloop, Circuito Podistico and Rome-Ostia Half Marathon that year. She also took consecutive victories at both the Corrida de Langueux and Corrida de Houilles 10K races in 2006 and 2007.

Representing Bahrain, she took a 5000 m silver medal and 10,000 m bronze medal at the 2007 Military World Games and won the bronze at the 2007 Asian Cross Country Championships. At the Athletics at the 2007 Pan Arab Games, she was the 10,000 m gold medallist.

She gained Italian citizenship in September 2009 by marriage. That year she was the winner at the Singelloop Utrecht. She won her first national title at the 2011 Italian Athletics Championships over 10,000 m. She came second at the Cross della Vallagarina in January 2011, finishing behind Ethiopian runner Fente Alemu Birtukan. She represented Italy internationally for the first time at the 2011 IAAF World Cross Country Championships, coming 34th overall. The following month she took part in the Great Ireland Run and reached the top three.

She won the Cremona Half Marathon in October with a career best run of 1:08:27 hours and a personal best of 2:26:15 in the marathon followed, as she was sixth at the Frankfurt Marathon. At November's Cross Internacional Valle de Llodio she won the 7.64 km race with half a minute to spare. She was in contention for a medal for much of the race at the 2011 European Cross Country Championships, but was edged into fourth late on by Gemma Steel. At the Cross de Venta de Baños later that month she was runner-up behind Priscah Jepleting. In her last race of the year, she came fourth at the Saint Silvester Road Race. She improved her 10K best to 31:52 minutes at the Great Manchester Run in May 2012, taking second place behind Linet Masai.

== Personal bests ==
- 5000 metres - 15:16.54 min (2012)
- 10,000 metres - 31:45:14 min (2012)
- Half marathon - 1:08:27 hrs (2011)
- Marathon - 2:26:15 hrs (2011)

== Achievements ==
Year	Competition	Venue	Position	Event	Notes
Representing Morocco
1998	World Junior Championships	Annecy, France	—	5000m	DQ (IAAF rule 141)
Representing Bahrain
2003	World Championships	Paris, France	44th	Marathon	2:38:39
2004	Olympic Games	Athens, Greece	—	Marathon	DNF
2005	World Championships	Helsinki, Finland	41st	Marathon	2:41:51
2006	Asian Games	Doha, Qatar	4th	5000 m	15:45.43
2007	Pan Arab Games	Cairo, Egypt	1st	10,000 m	32:29.53
2008	Olympic Games	Beijing, PR China	—	Marathon	DNF
Representing Italy
2011	World Cross Country Championships	Punta Umbría, Spain	34th	Senior race (8 km)	27:03
2012	European Championships	Helsinki, Finland	6th	5000 m	15:16.54 (PB)
2012	European Championships	Helsinki, Finland	—	10.000 m	DNF
2012	Olympic Games	London. United Kingdom	Heat	5000 metres	15:24.70
2012	Olympic Games	London. United Kingdom	18th	10,000 metres	31:57.03

== See also ==
- Italian all-time lists - 5000 metres
- Italian all-time lists - 10000 metres
- Italian all-time lists - Half marathon
- Italian all-time lists - Marathon
