= Sudan at the 2011 World Championships in Athletics =

- WA code: SUD
- National federation: Sudan Athletic Association

in Daegu
- Competitors: 3
- Medals: Gold 0 Silver 1 Bronze 0 Total 1

World Championships in Athletics appearances
- 1983; 1987; 1991; 1993; 1995; 1997; 1999; 2001; 2003; 2005; 2007; 2009; 2011; 2013; 2015; 2017; 2019; 2022; 2023

Sudan competed at the 2011 World Championships in Athletics from August 27 to September 4 in Daegu, South Korea.

== Team selection ==
A team of 3 athletes was announced to represent the country in the event. The team will be led by middle-distance runner Abubaker Kaki.

== Medalists ==
The following competitor from Sudan won a medal at the Championships

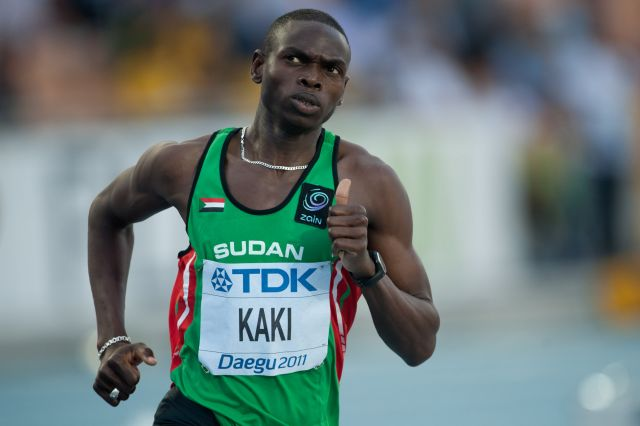
Abubaker Kaki won a silver medal in the Men's 800 metres event

| Medal | Athlete | Event |
|---|---|---|
| Silver | Abubaker Kaki | 800 metres |

== Results ==
=== Men ===
| Athlete | Event | Preliminaries | | Heats | | Semifinals | | Final | |
| Athlete | Event | Time Width Height | Rank | Time Width Height | Rank | Time Width Height | Rank | Time Width Height | Rank |
|---|---|---|---|---|---|---|---|---|---|
| Rabah Yousif | 400 metres | | | 45.20 | 9 | 45.43 | 8 | Did not advance | |
| Abubaker Kaki | 800 metres | | | 1:44.83 | 1 | 1:44.62 | 4 | 1:44.41 | 2nd place, silver medalist(s) |
| Ismail Ahmed Ismail | 800 metres | | | 1:52.33 | 39 | Did not advance | | | |
