= Safa Aissaoui =

Tunisian athlete (born 1985)

Medal record

Women's athletics

Representing Tunisia

World Junior Championships
Silver medal – second place	2004 Grosseto	3000 m

African Championships
Silver medal – second place	2006 Bambous	1500 m

Safa Aissaoui (also Issaoui; born 23 January 1985) is a retired Tunisian middle- and long-distance runner who mostly specialized in the 800 and 1500 metres.

In her early career she won the silver medal at the 3000 metres at the 2004 World Junior Championships. She also competed in the 5000 metres without finishing the race; in the 1500 metres at the 2003 World Youth Championships and in the junior races at the 2003 and 2004 World Cross Country Championships.

At the senior level, she competed at the World Cross Country Championships in 2005, 2009, 2010 and 2011 with her best placement being 54th in 2011. In regional and continental events, Aissaoui won a silver medal in the 5000 metres at the 2004 Pan Arab Games, two silver medals (and a bronze in the relay) at the 2005 Arab Athletics Championships, and a silver medal in the 1500 metres at the 2006 African Championships.

She also finished thirteenth at the 2005 Mediterranean Games and ninth at the 2009 Mediterranean Games, both in the 1500 metres. She competed in 800 metres at the 2006 African Championships and in the 1500 metres at the 2007 All-Africa Games without reaching the final.

Her personal best times were 2:06.2 minutes in the 800 metres, achieved in June 2009 in Nabeul; 4:14.32 minutes in the 1500 metres, achieved in June 2006 in Bucharest; 9:02.47 minutes in the 3000 metres, achieved at the 2004 World Junior Championships in Grosseto; and 16:12.24 minutes in the 5000 metres, achieved in June 2011 in Constanta.
