= Hasan Mahboob =

Kenyan long-distance runner competing for Bahrain

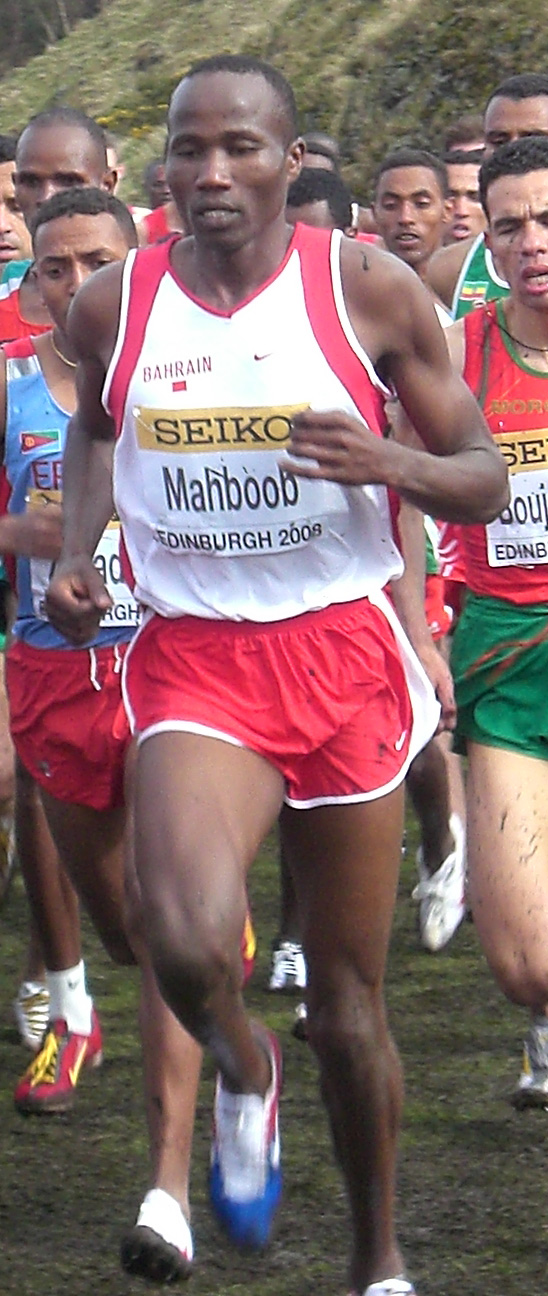
- Hasan Mahboob in 2008

Personal information
- Full name: Ali Hasan Mahboob
- Born: 31 December 1981 (age 44) Kapsabet, Kenya
- Height: 1.78 m (5 ft 10 in)
- Weight: 69 kg (152 lb)

Sport
- Sport: Athletics
- Events: 5000 metres, 10000 metres, Half marathon, Marathon
Medal record
Representing Bahrain
Asian Games
Gold medal – first place	2006 Doha	10,000 m
Gold medal – first place	2010 Guangzhou	5000 m
Gold medal – first place	2014 Incheon	Marathon
Bronze medal – third place	2010 Guangzhou	10,000 m
Pan Arab Games
Gold medal – first place	2011 Doha	10,000 m
Bronze medal – third place	2011 Doha	5000 m
Military World Games
Silver medal – second place	2011 Rio de Janeiro	10,000 m
Asian Athletics Championships
Gold medal – first place	2009 Guangzhou	10,000 m
Gold medal – first place	2011 Kobe	10,000 m
Silver medal – second place	2009 Guangzhou	5000 m
Bronze medal – third place	2007 Amman	10,000 m

Ali Hasan Mahboob (born Silas Kirui on 31 December 1981 in Kapsabet) is a Kenyan-born Bahraini long-distance runner. He became a naturalized citizen of Bahrain (switching from his birth country Kenya) ahead of the 2006 season. His personal best time for the 10,000 metres is 27:22.40 minutes, achieved in May 2012 in Wageningen.

== Career ==
In his early career he concentrated on road running and he won the Prague Half Marathon in 2005. In his debut race at a running track at the 2006 Asian Games he won the 10,000 metres final. He won the bronze medal at the 2007 Asian Championships. At the end of the year he won the 10,000 m title at the 2007 Pan Arab Games and also took bronze in the 5000 metres. He made his Olympic debut in the longer event at the 2008 Beijing Olympics, where he placed 18th in the final.

His major outing of 2009 was the Asian Athletics Championships and he set a championship record of 28:23.70 minutes to win the 10,000 m, but was narrowly beaten, preventing him from winning a distance double, by James Kwalia in the 5000 m. He turned to cross country at the 2010 IAAF World Cross Country Championships and managed to finish in sixth place in the highly competitive men's race. He returned to defend his 10,000 m title at the 2010 Asian Games and although he finished third in that event, he won the 5000 m title.

Mahboob again had a top ten finish at the 2011 IAAF World Cross Country Championships, but his main focus was on the track that year. He claimed his second 10,000 m title at the 2011 Asian Athletics Championships and was runner-up to Josphat Menjo in that event two weeks later at the 2011 Military World Games. He elected to run over the longer distance at the 2011 World Championships in Athletics, but did not manage to finish the race. He ended the year in regional competition, taking the 10,000 m title and 5000 m bronze at the 2011 Pan Arab Games.

At the 2012 Asian Cross Country Championships he came fourth in a Bahraini sweep of the top four places and shared in the team title.
