= Muna Jabir Adam =

Sudanese hurdler (born 1987)

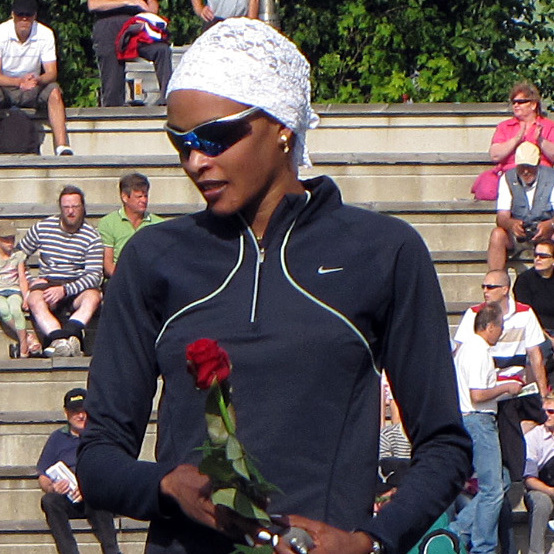

Personal information
- Full name: Muna Jabir Adam
- Nationality: Sudan
- Born: 6th January, 1987 Al-Ubayyid
- Occupation: athlete
- Height: 178 cm (5 ft 10 in)
- Weight: 59 kg (130 lb)

Muna Jabir Adam (born 6 January 1987) is a Sudanese track and field athlete born in El Obeid who specializes in the 400 metres hurdles.

== Career ==
Ahmed initially competed as a sprinter and known in 2002 when she won the 400 metres at the Arab Junior Athletics Championships in Cairo while still in the youth category. She repeated this achievement in 2004 and also won the 800 metres title. In the same year, she won four medals at the Pan Arab Games, including a gold medal in the 400 metres with a time of 53.34 seconds.

From 2005, she also began competing in the 400 metres hurdles and the heptathlon. She finished second at the African Combined Events Championships, then won the African Junior Championships, and later the Arab Championships, where she set a national record.

In 2007, she won the 400 metres hurdles at the African Games, improving her personal best to 54.93 seconds. She also competed at the World Championships in Osaka, where she lost in the semifinals. She competed at the 2008 Olympic Games in Beijing but lost in the heats.

== Achievements ==
Year	Competition	Venue	Position	Event	Notes
Representing Sudan
2003	World Youth Championships	Sherbrooke, Canada	6th	400 m	54.28
2003	All-Africa Games	Abuja, Nigeria	12th (h)	400 m	54.43
2004	World Junior Championships	Grosseto, Italy	10th (sf)	400 m	54.49
2006	World Junior Championships	Beijing, China	4th	400 m h	57.03
2007	All-Africa Games	Algiers, Algeria	1st	400 m h	54.93 NR
2007	All-Africa Games	Algiers, Algeria	3rd	4 × 400 m relay	3:34.84 NR
2007	World Championships	Osaka, Japan	15th (sf)	400 m h	55.65
2007	Pan Arab Games	Cairo, Egypt	1st	400 m h	56.07
2007	Pan Arab Games	Cairo, Egypt	2nd	4 × 100 m relay	47.43 NR
2007	Pan Arab Games	Cairo, Egypt	1st	4 × 400 m relay	3:38.56
2007	Pan Arab Games	Cairo, Egypt	1st	Heptathlon	4594
2008	Olympic Games	Beijing, China	20th (h)	400 m h	57.16

=== Personal bests ===
- 200 metres - 23.88 s (2007) - national record.
- 400 metres - 53.34 s (2004)
- 800 metres - 2:02.43 min s (2005) - national record.
- 100 metres hurdles - 14.31 s (2007) - national record.
- 400 metres hurdles - 54.93 s (2007) - national record.
- Heptathlon - 4977 pts (2005) - national record.
