= Rima Taha =

Jordanian sprinter

Rima Taha (born March 22, 1987, in Amman) is a Jordanian sprinter. She competed in the 100 metres at the 2012 Summer Olympics; she ran the preliminaries round in 12.66 seconds, her personal best time, which did not qualify her for Round 1.
