= Amina Bakhit =

Sudanese middle-distance runner

- Born: 14 November 1990 (age 35)
- Citizenship: Sudan
- Occupation: Runner

Amina Bakhit
Medal record

Representing Sudan

Women's athletics

Representing Sudan

Pan Arab Games
| Gold medal – first place | 2007 Cairo | 800 m |
| Bronze medal – third place | 2011 Doha | 10,000 m |

Amina Barcham Bakhit (born 14 November 1990) is a Sudanese middle-distance runner. At the 2012 Summer Olympics, she competed in the Women's 800 metres.

She won gold at the 2007 Pan Arab Games in the 800 m and bronze in the 10,000 m at the 2011 Pan Arab Games.

== Doping case ==
Bakhit tested positive for norandrosterone at a competition in Sollentuna, Sweden in June 2009 and was subsequently handed a two-year ban from sports. The ban ended on 16 July 2011.
