= Muna Durka =

Sudanese steeplechase runner (born 1988)

Personal information
- Full name: Muna Kalameya Durka
- Nationality: Sudan
- Born: 19 June 1988 (age 38)

Sport
- Sport: Athletics
- Event: Steeplechase

Achievements and titles
- Personal bests: 2000 m steeplechase: 6:44.17 (2003); 3000 m steeplechase: 9:47.41 (2008)

Muna Kalameya Durka (Arabic: منى دركة; born June 19, 1988) is a Sudanese steeplechase runner. Durka represented Sudan at the 2008 Summer Olympics in Beijing, where she competed for the first ever women's 3000 metres steeplechase. She ran in the second heat against sixteen other athletes, including Russia's Tatyana Petrova, who eventually won the bronze medal in the final. She finished the race in ninth place by six seconds behind Ethiopia's Sofia Assefa, with a time of 9:53.09. Durka, however, failed to advance into the final, as she placed thirty-eighth overall, and was ranked below four mandatory slots for the next round.
