= Camélia Sahnoune =

Algerian triple jumper

Camélia Sahnoune (born 5 April 1986) is an Algerian triple jumper.

She finished fourth at the 2008 African Championships. Her personal best jump is 13.92 metres, achieved in May 2008 in Algiers.
