= Kareema Saleh Jasim =

Kenyan-Bahraini long-distance runner (born 1988)

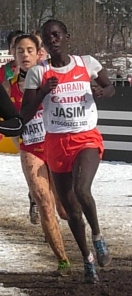
- Kareema Jasim at the 2013 World Cross Country Championships

Personal information
- Born: 18 February 1988 (age 38) Kenya
Medal record
Women's athletics
Representing Bahrain
Asian Games
Silver medal – second place	2006 Doha	10,000 m
Asian Championships
Gold medal – first place	2007 Amman	5000 m
Gold medal – first place	2007 Amman	10,000 m
Military World Games
Bronze medal – third place	2007 Hyderabad	5000 m
Bronze medal – third place	2011 Rio de Janeiro	5000 m

Kareema Saleh Jasim (born 18 February 1988) is a Kenyan-born Bahraini professional long-distance runner who competes in distances ranging from 3000 metres to the half marathon, as well as the steeplechase. She is the Bahraini national record holder in the 10,000 m and steeplechase.

Jasim rose to prominence with a 10,000 m silver medal at the 2006 Asian Games and then won both the long-distance events at the 2007 Asian Athletics Championships. She is a two-time medallist at the Military World Games (5000 m) and the Pan Arab Games (half marathon). She is a three-time participant at the IAAF World Cross Country Championships and was runner-up at the Asian Cross Country Championships in 2007.

== Career ==
Born in Kenya, she began competing for Bahrain in 2005. She made her international debut at that year's Arab Athletics Championships, taking the 5000 metres bronze medal before going on to win both the 10,000 metres and half marathon events. Her time of 34:45.47 minutes for the 10,000 metres was a Bahraini national record. She headed to Europe for the start of the 2006 season and was runner-up at the Cross della Vallagarina before taking the title at the Corrida di San Geminiano road race. At the 2006 Asian Indoor Athletics Championships she came fourth in the 3000 m but set a national record mark of 9:28.90 minutes. Her global debut came in the short race of the 2006 IAAF World Cross Country Championships, where she came 28th. Moving into the track season, at the 2006 Asian Junior Athletics Championships she fourth in the 3000 m and the 5000 m silver medallist. She managed only 13th in the 3000 m at the 2006 World Junior Championships in Athletics. The Arab Junior Championships saw her take a sweep of medals, winning the 3000 m, 5000 m and steeplechase titles (setting a national record of 10:35.8 minutes in the latter event).

The 2006 Asian Games marked Jasim's breakthrough as a senior athlete. Although she was beaten by Kayoko Fukushi in the 10,000 m, she finished ahead of Hiromi Ominami to take the silver medal in a national record time of 32:17.14 minutes. She was part of a Bahraini medal sweep at the 2007 Asian Cross Country Championships, finishing second to her teammate Maryam Yusuf Jamal. At the Arab Athletics Championships in May she was second in the 5000 m and defended her half marathon title. She ran a 3000 m personal best of 9:14.30 minutes at the Hanžeković Memorial before going on to a long-distance double at the 2007 Asian Athletics Championships, going unchallenged in weak women's fields. Later in the season she was third in the 5000 m at the 2007 Military World Games and won the half marathon at the 2007 Pan Arab Games. She also set a half marathon best of 71:52 minutes in a second-place performance at the Route du Vin Half Marathon.

Her sole international outing the following year came at the 2008 IAAF World Cross Country Championships, where she was 17th. Her outings on the road that year included a win at the Marrakesh Half Marathon, second at the Great Yorkshire Run and a 10K best run of 32:43 minutes for third at the Singelloop Utrecht. She was absent from competition in 2009. She returned to major events at the 2010 Asian Games: Jasim produced a steeplechase national record of 10:05.60 minutes to take fourth place and repeated that finish in the 5000 m with a personal best of 15:20.01 minutes.

Jasim began 2012 with a personal best at the Marrakesh Half Marathon, running a time of 71:06 minutes for second behind Asmae Leghzaoui. A 25th-place finish at the 2011 IAAF World Cross Country Championships helped Bahrain to fourth in the team rankings. She formed a Bahraini 1–2 over 10,000 m behind Shitaye Eshete at the 2011 Asian Athletics Championships She was third behind Kenyan opposition in the 5000 m at the 2011 Military World Games (repeating her finish from 2007) and ended the year with a runner-up finish to compatriot Lishan Dula at the 2011 Pan Arab Games half marathon.
