= Abdalla Abdelgadir =

Sudanese middle-distance runner

Personal information
- Nationality: Sudanese
- Born: 12 September 1988 (age 37)

Sport
- Sport: Athletics (track and field)
- Events: 800 m and 1500 m

Achievements and titles
- Personal bests: Outdoor: 800 m: 1:47.12 (2009); 1500 m: 3:38.93 (2008); Mile: 4:00.84 (2003); Indoor: 800 m: 1:48.60 (2008)
Medal record
Men's athletics
Representing Sudan
Afro-Asian Games
Gold medal – first place	2003 Hyderabad-Secunderabad	800 m

Abdalla Abdelgadir El-Sheikh (born 12 September 1988), also known as Abdalla Abdel Gadir (Arabic: عبدالله عبد القادر), is a Sudanese middle-distance runner who specializes in the 1500 metres.

== Career ==
He finished fifth (in 800 m) at the 2003 World Youth Championships and twelfth at the 2006 World Junior Championships. He won the gold medal in the 1500 m at the 2003 Afro-Asian Games. He competed at the 2008 Olympic Games without progressing to the second round.

== Personal bests ==
His personal best times are:

- 800 metres - 1:48.74 min (2004)
- 1500 metres - 3:38.93 min (2008)
- Mile run - 4:00.84 min (2003)
