= Gulf Cooperation Council Athletics Championships =

International sporting competition

The Gulf Cooperation Council Athletics Championship (also known as the GCC Athletics Championships) is a biennial international athletics competition between athletes from nations within the Cooperation Council for the Arab States of the Gulf. It was first held in 1986.

In addition to the senior championship, the GCC also holds the Gulf Cooperation Council Youth Athletics Championships. There was also a separate Gulf Cooperation Council Junior Athletics Championships for U20 athletes held from 17 to 19 March 2006 in Qatif, Saudi Arabia. The GCC holds championships for various other sports, including golf, basketball and fencing.

The 2011 championships was held as part of the 2011 GCC Games.

== Editions ==
Ed.	Year	City	Country	Dates	No. of events	No. of athletes
1st	1986	Doha	Qatar			
2nd	1988	Doha	Qatar			
3rd	1992	Riyadh	Saudi Arabia			
4th	1994	Doha	Qatar			
5th	1996	Kuwait City	Kuwait			
6th	1998	Muscat	Oman			
7th	2000	Kuwait City	Kuwait			
8th	2002	Qatif	Saudi Arabia			
9th	2003	Kuwait City	Kuwait			
10th	2005	Manama	Bahrain			
11th	2007	?	?			
12th	2009	Qatif	Saudi Arabia			
13th	2011	Isa Town	Bahrain			
14th	2013	Doha	Qatar			
15th	2015	Qatif	Saudi Arabia			
16th	2017	Jeddah	Saudi Arabia			

== Champions ==
=== 100 metres ===
- 1986: Talal Mansour (QAT)
- 1988: Talal Mansour (QAT)
- 1992: Talal Mansour (QAT)
- 1994: Talal Mansour (QAT)
- 1996: Hamed Sadeq (KUW)
- 1998: Saad Muftah Al-Kuwari (QAT)
- 2000: Jamal Al-Saffar (KSA)
- 2002: Salem Al-Yami (KSA)
- 2003: Salem Al-Yami (KSA)
- 2005: Salem Al-Yami (KSA)

=== 200 metres ===
- 1986: Talal Mansour (QAT)
- 1988: Talal Mansour (QAT)
- 1992: Saad Muftah Al-Kuwari (QAT)
- 1994: Talal Mansour (QAT)
- 1996: Ibrahim Ismail Muftah (QAT)
- 1998: Mohamed Al-Houti (OMN)
- 2000: Mohamed Al-Houti (OMN)
- 2002: Salem Mubarak Al-Yami (KSA)
- 2003: Fawzi Al-Shammari (KUW)
- 2005: Hamed Al-Bishi (KSA)

=== 400 metres ===
- 1986: Saad Muftah Al-Kuwari (QAT)
- 1988: Mohammed Al-Malki (OMN)
- 1992: Ibrahim Ismail Muftah (QAT)
- 1994: Ibrahim Ismail Muftah (QAT)
- 1996: Ibrahim Ismail Muftah (QAT)
- 1998: Ibrahim Ismail Muftah (QAT)
- 2000: Ibrahim Ismail Muftah (QAT)
- 2002: Fawzi Al-Shammari (KUW)
- 2003: Fawzi Al-Shammari (KUW)
- 2005: Hamdan Al-Bishi (KSA)

=== 800 metres ===
- 1986: Khalid Khalifa (KUW)
- 1988: Ismail Mohamed Youssef (QAT)
- 1992: Ismail Mohamed Youssef (QAT)
- 1994: Abdul Rahman Al-Abdullah (QAT)
- 1996: Abdul Rahman Al-Abdullah (QAT)
- 1998: Othman Mohammed Othman (KSA)
- 2000: Mohammad Al-Azemi (KUW)
- 2002: Adam Abdu Adam Ali (QAT)
- 2003: Rashid Mohamed (BHR)
- 2005: Mohammed Al-Salhi (KSA)

=== 1500 metres ===
- 1986: Najem Abdullah Mutlaq (KUW)
- 1988: Mohamed Suleiman (QAT)
- 1992: Mohamed Suleiman (QAT)
- 1994: Mohamed Suleiman (QAT)
- 1996: Mohamed Suleiman (QAT)
- 1998: Mohamed Suleiman (QAT)
- 2000: Othman Mohammed Othman (KSA)
- 2002: Faisal Rabi Al-Nahdi (KSA)
- 2003: Rashid Ramzi (BHR)
- 2005: Daham Najim Bashir (QAT)

=== 5000 metres ===
- 1986: Meflah Saad (QAT)
- 1988: Mohamed Suleiman (QAT)
- 1992: Ahmed Ibrahim Warsama (QAT)
- 1994: Jamal Abdi Hassan (QAT)
- 1996: Alyan Al-Qahtani (KSA)
- 1998: Saad Al-Asmari (KSA)
- 2000: Khamis Abdullah Saifeldin (QAT)
- 2002: Saad Al-Asmari (KSA)
- 2003: Khamis Abdullah Saifeldin (QAT)
- 2005: Essa Ismail Rashed (QAT)

=== 10,000 metres ===
- 1986: Meflah Saad (QAT)
- 1988: Ahmed Ibrahim Warsama (QAT)
- 1992: Ahmed Ibrahim Warsama (QAT)
- 1994: Ahmed Ibrahim Warsama (QAT)
- 1996: Alyan Sultan Al-Qahtani (KSA)
- 1998: Alyan Sultan Al-Qahtani (KSA)
- 2000: Ahmed Ibrahim Warsama (QAT)
- 2002: Saad Al-Asmari (KSA)
- 2003: Aman Majid Awadh (QAT)
- 2005: Mohammed Abduh Bakhet (QAT)

=== Marathon ===
- 1986: Mahid Al-Qahtani (KSA)

=== Half marathon ===
- 1992: Abdullah Al-Dosari (BHR)
- 1994: Ahmed Ibrahim Warsama (QAT)
- 1996: Hader Misfer Al-Dosari (KSA)
- 1998: Abdullah Yousef (QAT)
- 2000: Ali Ahmed Saleh (QAT)
- 2002: Alyan Sultan Al-Qahtani (KSA)
- 2003: Mohammed Hamed Abdul Al-Hamed (QAT)
- 2005: Mubarak Hassan Shami (QAT)

=== 3000 metres steeplechase ===
- 1986: Mohammed al-Dosari (KSA)
- 1988: Ali Ahmed Saleh (QAT)
- 1992: Mohammed Barak Al-Dosari (KSA)
- 1994: Jamal Abdi Hassan (QAT)
- 1996: Ibrahim Al-Asiri Yahya (KSA)
- 1998: Saad Shadad Al-Asmari (KSA)
- 2000: Khamis Abdullah Saifeldin (QAT)
- 2002: Khamis Abdullah Saifeldin (QAT)
- 2003: Khamis Abdullah Saifeldin (QAT)
- 2005: Nasser Shams Kareem (QAT)

=== 110 metres hurdles ===
- 1986: Rashid Sheban Marzouk (QAT)
- 1988: Rashid Sheban Marzouk (QAT)
- 1992: Zeyad Abdulrazak (KUW)
- 1994: Rashid Sheban Marzouk (QAT)
- 1996: Bader Abbas (KUW)
- 1998: Hamad Mubarak Al-Dosari (QAT)
- 2000: Mubarak Ata Mubarak (KSA)
- 2002: Mubarak Ata Mubarak (KSA)
- 2003: Mubarak Ata Mubarak (KSA)
- 2005: Mubarak Ata Mubarak (KSA)

=== 400 metres hurdles ===
- 1986: Ahmed Hamada (BHR)
- 1988: Ahmed Hamada (BHR)
- 1992: Mohamed Hamed Al-Bishi (KSA)
- 1994: Mohamed Hamed Al-Bishi (KSA)
- 1996: Hadi Soua'an Al-Somaily (KSA)
- 1998: Mubarak Al-Nubi (QAT)
- 2000: Bader Aman Abdulrahman (KUW)
- 2002: Hadi Soua'an Al-Somaily (KSA)
- 2003: Mubarak Al-Nubi (QAT)
- 2005: Mubarak Al-Nubi (QAT)

=== High jump ===
- 1986: Abdullah Mohamed Al-Sheib (QAT)
- 1988: Abdullah Mohamed Al-Sheib (QAT)
- 1992: Abdullah Mohamed Al-Sheib (QAT)
- 1994: Abdullah Mohamed Al-Sheib (QAT)
- 1996: Abdullah Taher Al-Saleh (KSA)
- 1998: Ali Mohammed Al-Fadak (QAT)
- 2000: Omar Moussa Al-Masrahi (KSA)
- 2002: Omar Moussa Al-Masrahi (KSA)
- 2003: Salem Nasser Bakheet (BHR)
- 2005: Omar Moussa Al-Masrahi (KSA)

=== Pole vault ===
- 1986: Ahmed Ali Ghassem (QAT)
- 1988: Walid Zaid (QAT)
- 1992: Walid Zaid (QAT)
- 1994: Walid Zaid (QAT)
- 1996: Ahmed Abdulkarim (QAT)
- 1998: Ahmed Abdulkarim (QAT)
- 2000: Abdullah Saoud Ghanem (QAT)
- 2002: Abdullah Saoud Ghanem (QAT)
- 2003: Fahed Al-Mershad (KUW)
- 2005: Ali Maki Hassan Al-Sabbagh (KUW)

=== Long jump ===
- 1986: Abdullah Mohamed Al-Sheib (QAT)
- 1988: Abdullah Mohamed Al-Sheib (QAT)
- 1992: Jihad Al-Sheikh (OMN)
- 1994: Ahmad Hadib Bashir (OMN)
- 1996: Fahd Mansour (KUW)
- 1998: Abdulrahman Al-Nubi (QAT)
- 2000: Hussein Al-Sabee (KSA)
- 2002: Mohammed Al-Khuwalidi (KSA)
- 2003: Hussein Al-Sabee (KSA)
- 2005: Mohammed Al-Khuwalidi (KSA)

=== Triple jump ===
- 1986: Samah Farhan Al-Bekhit (KUW)
- 1988: Abdul Marzouk Al-Yoha (KUW)
- 1992: Abdul Marzouk Al-Yoha (KUW)
- 1994: Salem Al-Ahmadi (KSA)
- 1996: Salem Al-Ahmadi (KSA)
- 1998: Salem Al-Ahmadi (KSA)
- 2000: Salem Al-Ahmadi (KSA)
- 2002: Salem Al-Ahmadi (KSA)
- 2003: Salem Al-Ahmadi (KSA)
- 2005: Salem Al-Ahmadi (KSA)

=== Shot put ===
- 1986: Mohammed Abdullah (KUW)
- 1988: Mohammed Garib (KUW)
- 1992: Bilal Saad Mubarak (QAT)
- 1994: Khaled Al-Khalidi (KSA)
- 1996: Bilal Saad Mubarak (QAT)
- 1998: Bilal Saad Mubarak (QAT)
- 2000: Bilal Saad Mubarak (QAT)
- 2002: Bilal Saad Mubarak (QAT)
- 2003: Bilal Saad Mubarak (QAT)
- 2005: Khalid Habash Al-Suwaidi (QAT)

=== Discus throw ===
- 1986: Ibrahim Mohamed Al-Ouiran (KSA)
- 1988: Ibrahim Mohamed Al-Ouiran (KSA)
- 1992: Ibrahim Mohamed Al-Ouiran (KSA)
- 1994: Khaled Al-Khalidi (KSA)
- 1996: Khaled Al-Khalidi (KSA)
- 1998: Khaled Al-Khalidi (KSA)
- 2000: Rashid Shafi Al-Dosari (QAT)
- 2002: Rashid Shafi Al-Dosari (QAT)
- 2003: Khalid Habash Al-Suwaidi (QAT)
- 2005: Sultan Al-Dawoodi (KSA)

=== Hammer throw ===
- 1986: Waleed Al-Bekheet (KUW)
- 1988: Waleed Al-Bekheet (KUW)
- 1992: Waleed Al-Bekheet (KUW)
- 1994: Waleed Al-Bekheet (KUW)
- 1996: Waleed Al-Bekheet (KUW)
- 1998: Nasser Abdul Al-Jarallah (KUW)
- 2000: Nasser Abdul Al-Jarallah (KUW)
- 2002: Mohamed Faraj Al-Kaabi (QAT)
- 2003: Ali Al-Zinkawi (KUW)
- 2005: Ali Al-Zinkawi (KUW)

=== Javelin throw ===
- 1986: Ghanem Zaid (KUW)
- 1988: Ghanem Zaid (KUW)
- 1992: Abdul Azim Al-Aliwat (KSA)
- 1994: Ali Saleh Al-Jadani (KSA)
- 1996: Ghanem Zaid (KUW)
- 1998: Ali Saleh Al-Jadani (KSA)
- 2000: Ahmed Abu Jalala (QAT)
- 2002: Mohammed Ibrahim Al-Khalifa (QAT)
- 2003: Mohammed Ibrahim Al-Khalifa (QAT)
- 2005: Ahmed Abu Jalala (QAT)

=== Decathlon ===
- 1986: Mohamed Monassar Saleh (QAT)
- 1988: Mohamed Monassar Saleh (QAT)
- 1992: Assem Mohammed Ali Al-Hezam (KSA)
- 1994: Ibrahim Al-Matrooshi (UAE)
- 1996: Abdul Marzouk Al-Shahrani (KSA)
- 1998: Ahmad Hassan Moussa (QAT)
- 2000: Ahmad Hassan Moussa (QAT)
- 2002: Ahmad Hassan Moussa (QAT)
- 2003: Mohammed Rida Al-Matroud (KSA)
- 2005: Ibrahim Abou Al-Ainain (QAT)

=== 20 km walk ===
- 1986: Ali Hitfer (QAT)

=== 10,000 metres walk ===
- 1994: Ibrahim Sharif (QAT)
- 1996: Not held
- 1998: Issa Barsham (QAT)
- 2000: Walid Ahmed Al-Sabahi (QAT)
- 2002: Walid Ahmed Al-Sabahi (QAT)
- 2003: Walid Ahmed Al-Sabahi (QAT)
- 2005: Walid Ahmed Al-Sabahi (QAT)

=== 4 × 100 metres relay ===
- 1986: Qatar (QAT)
- 1988: Qatar (QAT)
- 1992: Saudi Arabia (KSA)
- 1994: Qatar (QAT)
- 1996: Qatar (QAT)
- 1998: Qatar (QAT)
- 2000: Saudi Arabia (KSA)
- 2002: Saudi Arabia (KSA)
- 2003: Qatar (QAT)
- 2005: Oman (OMN)

=== 4 × 400 metres relay ===
- 1986: Qatar (QAT)
- 1988: Qatar (QAT)
- 1992: Qatar (QAT)
- 1994: Saudi Arabia (KSA)
- 1996: Qatar (QAT)
- 1998: Qatar (QAT)
- 2000: Kuwait (KUW)
- 2002: Kuwait (KUW)
- 2003: Saudi Arabia (KSA)
- 2005: Saudi Arabia (KSA)

== See also ==
- GCC Champions League, a regional football competition for Gulf states
