= 1984 Arab Junior Athletics Championships =

1st Arab Junior Athletics Championships
- Dates: 21–23 July
- Host city: Casablanca, Morocco
- Events: 38

The 1984 Arab Junior Athletics Championships was the inaugural edition of the international athletics competition for under-20 athletes from Arab countries. It took place in Casablanca, Morocco from 21–23 July. A total of 38 athletics events were contested, 22 for men and 16 for women. The competition was scheduled to be held in the years between the biennial Arab Athletics Championships for senior athletes.

The junior programme featured two unusual variations in a 30 km road race and a 15 km road walk. No other junior championship has featured these distances. Similar to the European Athletics Junior Championships, the steeplechase was contested over a distance of 2000 m, as opposed to the usual 3000 m at senior events. The establishment of the Arab Junior Championships pre-dated both the Asian Junior Athletics Championships and the African Junior Athletics Championships, as well as the World Junior Championships in Athletics, making it the first competition of its type for the countries involved.

The hosts, Morocco, topped the table with eleven gold medals, nine of them from the women's section. Algeria was second, with eight gold medals, and Tunisia rounded out the top three with seven golds. Several athletes achieved individual doubles. Mustapha Kamel Selmi completed a men's sprint double and was later a 1988 Olympian. Ahmed Ibrahim Warsama won a long-distance double and would go on to win many senior medals in senior Asian competition. Fadhel Khayati won both men's hurdles events and went on to represent Tunisia at the 1992 Olympics. On the women's side, Yasmina Azzizi established herself with a heptathlon/100 metres hurdles double; she dominated the former event at regional level later in the decade. Middle-distance doubles were achieved in both the men's and women's sides, but the winners Sabih Ayman and Mounir Allaoui, were not successful at senior level.

The event was part of a flourish of athletics championships in the mid-1980s in Casablanca, Morocco's largest city. The 1983 Maghreb Athletics Championships and Mediterranean Games were held there the previous year, and the 1985 Pan Arab Games came the year after.

== Medal summary ==
=== Men ===
Event	Gold		Silver		Bronze	
100 metres	Mustapha Kamel Selmi (ALG)	10.68	Mourad Meriah (TUN)	10.78	Mustapha Rahmouni (MAR)	10.86
200 metres	Mustapha Kamel Selmi (ALG)	21.81	Yousef Abderrahman (IRQ)	21.89	Mourad Meriah (TUN)	22.34
400 metres	Abbas Ali Laftat (IRQ)	47.88	Yousef Abderrahman (IRQ)	48.52	Hassan Adnane (MAR)	49.34
800 metres	Mounir Allaoui (ALG)	1:49.51	Mustapha Lachaal (MAR)	1:49.93	Khalif Fakhr (IRQ)	1:50.29
1500 metres	Mounir Allaoui (ALG)	3:49.28	Abdelhak Hénane (ALG)	3:50.03	Mustapha Lachaal (MAR)	3:50.64
5000 metres	Abdelhak Hénane (ALG)	15:21.29	Rédouane Sabouane (MAR)	15:25.47	Abdeslam Halal (MAR)	15:28.21
110 m hurdles	Fadhel Khayati (TUN)	14.88	Shabane Chabid (IRQ)	14.93	Rashid Abdullah (KUW)	15.19
400 m hurdles	Fadhel Khayati (TUN)	51.61	Fahd Al-Enazi (KUW)	53.25	Aissam Kathem (IRQ)	53.72
2000 metres steeplechase	Mohammed al-Dosari (KSA)	5:47.33	Yamine Alaoui (MAR)	5:47.34	Youssef Sossé Alaoui (MAR)	5:54.30
4×100 m relay	Tunisia (TUN)	42.36	Morocco (MAR)	42.52	Algeria (ALG)	42.76
4×400 m relay	Iraq (IRQ)	3:10.18	Morocco (MAR)	3:15.46	Algeria (ALG)	3:15.46
30 km road race	Ahmed Ibrahim Warsama (QAT)	1:42:00	El Kharrat (MAR)	1:45:02	Salah Qoqaiche (MAR)	1:45:17
15 km walk	Arezki Boumrar (ALG)	1:17:38	Choukri Saada (TUN)	1:18:02	Brahim Bouharrada (MAR)	1:18:53
High jump	Tareq Al-Farhan (KUW)	2.10 m	Fahd Mansour (KUW)	2.07 m	Hassan El Aïdi (MAR)	2.04 m
Pole vault	Adel Razag (TUN)	4.40 m	Youssef Qortobi (MAR)	4.40 m	Sofiène Lezri (TUN)	4.30 m
Long jump	Mustapha Benmrah (MAR)	7.59w m	Jaloul Mohammed Arafat (IRQ)	7.52 m	Shawat Mahdi (IRQ)	7.46 m
Triple jump	Fethi Khelid Aboud (LBY)	15.58 m	Mori Haj Mahdi (IRQ)	15.46 m	Mustapha Benmrah (MAR)	15.42 m
Shot put	Waji Khalid (IRQ)	15.05 m	Khalid Salman Al-Khalidi (KSA)	13.70 m	Khalid Fatihi (MAR)	13.47 m
Discus throw	Hichem Harakati (TUN)	45.72 m	Mounir Dimassi (IRQ)	42.38 m	Hamid Oujouhou (MAR)	41.20 m
Hammer throw	Waleed Al-Bekheet (KUW)	54.10 m	Saleh Al-Hidar (KUW)	53.22 m	Mohamed Khaldi (MAR)	50.70 m
Javelin throw	Ghanem Mabrouk Zaid Johar (KUW)	69.56 m	Aliwan Abduladim (KSA)	58.50 m	Boubker Ouiri (MAR)	58.40 m
Decathlon	Abdelhak Touhami (MAR)	6201 pts	Sami Si Mohamed (ALG)	6066 pts	Saad Fahd (KSA)	6034 pts

=== Women ===
Event	Gold		Silver		Bronze	
100 metres	Méryem Oumezdi (MAR)	12.49	Shakr Azhar (IRQ)	12.64	Latifa Lahcen (MAR)	12.66
200 metres	Lamia Makni (TUN)	25.97	Latifa Lahcen (MAR)	26.21	Shakr Azhar (IRQ)	26.21
400 metres	Sabih Ayman (IRQ)	57.34	Rachida Asname (MAR)	58.92	Amal Boudjelti (ALG)	59.19
800 metres	Sabih Ayman (IRQ)	2:10.29	Sonia Meksi (TUN)	2:10.30	Rachida Asname (MAR)	2:10.40
1500 metres	Sonia Gharbi (TUN)	4:30.39	Zohra Koulou (MAR)	4:36.59	Samadia Belkebiche (ALG)	4:37.90
3000 metres	Zohra Koulou (MAR)	9:55.82	Amina Chaabane (ALG)	10:23.00	Malika Naghibi (MAR)	10:36.59
100 m hurdles	Yasmina Azzizi (ALG)	15.19	Aïcha Sari (MAR)	15.54	Selma Triki (TUN)	15.83
400 m hurdles	Aïcha Faycal (MAR)	64.24	Fatima Nejjam (MAR)	65.25	Iman Abdulamir (IRQ)	80.55
4×100 m relay	Morocco (MAR)	48.38	Tunisia (TUN)	49.52	Iraq (IRQ)	49.78
4×400 m relay	Morocco (MAR)	3:58.84	Tunisia (TUN)	4:03.40	Iraq (IRQ)	4:07.28
High jump	Nadia Idrissi (MAR)	1.53 m	Méryem Benamar (MAR)	1.53 m	Rym Fatma Guizani (TUN)	1.45 m
Long jump	Méryem Benamar (MAR)	5.80 m	Basma Fkih (TUN)	5.44w m	Jamila Najen (IRQ)	5.41 m
Shot put	Ghania Touil (ALG)	11.51 m	Zahia Méziane (MAR)	10.64 m	Chihab (MAR)	10.16 m
Discus throw	Zahia Méziane (MAR)	41.72 m	Nabila Mouelhi (TUN)	41.64 m	Chihab (MAR)	29.12 m
Javelin throw	Naïma Fouad (MAR)	38.80 m	Ghania Touil (ALG)	32.26 m	Nezha Dounia (MAR)	30.32 m
Heptathlon	Yasmina Azzizi (ALG)	3269 pts	Fatiha Meskaoui (MAR)	3127 pts	Amal Belouadi (MAR)	3122 pts

== Medal table ==
Rank	Nation	Gold	Silver	Bronze	Total
1	Morocco (MAR)	11	15	20	46
2	Algeria (ALG)	9	4	4	17
3	Tunisia (TUN)	7	7	4	18
4	Iraq (IRQ)	5	7	8	20
5	Kuwait (KUW)	3	3	1	7
6	Saudi Arabia (KSA)	1	2	1	4
7	Libya (LBY)	1	0	0	1
7	Qatar (QAT)	1	0	0	1
Totals (8 entries)		38	38	38	114
