= 1993 Arab Athletics Championships =

8th Arab Athletics Championships
- Dates: 24–27 September
- Host city: Latakia, Syria
- Events: 40

The 1993 Arab Athletics Championships was the eighth edition of the international athletics competition between Arab countries. It took place in Latakia, Syria from 24 to 27 September. A total of 40 athletics events were contested, 23 for men and 17 for women.

The men's marathon was replaced by the half marathon at this edition – a change which later became the standard at the competition. It was the last time that the 3000 metres was on the programme; it was the only women's long-distance running event here. The women's 400 metres hurdles was dropped from the programme due to a lack of entries.

== Medal summary ==
=== Men ===
Event	Gold		Silver		Bronze	
100 metres	Saad Muftah Al-Kuwari (QAT)	10.52	Sultan Mohamed Al-Sheib (QAT)	10.53	Ahmad Ouda Yad (EGY)	10.70
200 metres	Ibrahim Ismail Muftah (QAT)	20.93	Ahmad Ouda Yad (EGY)	21.46	Mohamed El-Mohazzaâ (BHR)	21.48
400 metres	Ibrahim Ismail Muftah (QAT)	45.84	Mohammed Al-Beshi (KSA)	47.17	Sami Suleiman Srour (QAT)	47.40
800 metres	Mohamed Suleiman (QAT)	1:47.9	Mahmoud Al-Kheirat (SYR)	1:47.9	Farouk Amouch (ALG)	1:48.7
1500 metres	Ahmed Ibrahim Warsama (QAT)	3:52.07	Ali Hakimi (TUN)	3:52.79	Saad Al-Asmari (KSA)	3:53.32
5000 metres	Mohamed Suleiman (QAT)	14:23.74	Mohamed Ahmed Amer (UAE)	14:27.29	Hedi Khalfallah (TUN)	14:34.96
10,000 metres	Azzedine Sakhri (ALG)	30:15.3	Mokhtar Hizaoui (TUN)	30:15.9	Majead Al-Hosen (SYR)	31:18.5
110 metres hurdles	Mohamed Mohamed Samy (EGY)	14.33	Bader Abbas (KUW)	14.89	Hadi Soua'an Al-Somaily (KSA)	14.92
400 metres hurdles	Zid Abou Hamed (SYR)	49.23	Fadhel Khayati (TUN)	50.24	Helmi Abdelmaksoud (EGY)	50.43
3000 metres steeplechase	Saâd Shaddad (KSA)	8:51.22	Mohamed Ahmed Amer (UAE)	8:51.95	Hamadi Chabbouh (TUN)	9:15.06
4 × 100 m relay	Qatar (QAT)	40.7	Oman (OMN)	41.0	Saudi Arabia (KSA)	41.0
4 × 400 m relay	Qatar (QAT)	3:08.7	Saudi Arabia (KSA)	3:12.2	Syria (SYR)	3:13.2
Half marathon	Mokhtar Hizaoui (TUN)	1:08:34	Majead Al-Hosen (SYR)	1:08:48	Abdallah Youssef (QAT)	1:10:15
20 km walk	Moussa Aouanouk (ALG)	1:39:00	Ahmed Abdelhamid (EGY)	1:40:00	Khalid Ghamama (SYR)	1:49:24
High jump	Abdulla Al-Sheib (QAT)	2.19 m	Jawad Benhassine (ALG)	2.13 m	Fakhredin Fouad (JOR)	2.13 m
Pole vault	Walid Zayed (QAT)	4.80 m	Belkacem Touami (ALG)	4.60 m	Ahmed Abu Zeyd (EGY)	4.60 m
Long jump	Musbah Ali Saeed (UAE)	7.74 m	Abdulla Al-Sheib (QAT)	7.66 m	Abdullah Khamis Al-Hamad (QAT)	7.42 m
Triple jump	Mohamed Karim Sassi (TUN)	15.88 m	Salem Al-Ahmedi (KSA)	15.46 m	Samah Farhan Al-Bekhit (KUW)	15.43 m
Shot put	Bilal Saad Mubarak (QAT)	18.57 m	Khaled Suliman Al-Khalidi (KSA)	17.50 m	Abdallah Soursour (KUW)	17.30 m
Discus throw	Khaled Suliman Al-Khalidi (KSA)	50.94 m	Abdel Ilah Saïd (KSA)	49.28 m	Hassan Ahmed Hamad (EGY)	48.88 m
Hammer throw	Waleed Al-Bekheet (KUW)	67.22 m	Hakim Toumi (ALG)	65.64 m	Hassan Eshkenani (KUW)	64.52 m
Javelin throw	Maher Ridane (TUN)	70.54 m	Ghanem Jaouhar (KUW)	68.40 m	Jaber Al-Shihabi (QAT)	66.50 m
Decathlon	Abderrahmane Hadjou (ALG)	6918 pts	Anis Riahi (TUN)	6878 pts	Hassan Abu Najem (JOR)	6752 pts

=== Women ===
Event	Gold		Silver		Bronze	
100 metres	Karima Meskin Saad (EGY)	12.23	Neiry Mouradian (LIB)	13.11	Soussy Naqshaban (SYR)	13.39
200 metres	Karima Meskin Saad (EGY)	24.68	Fatma Saleh (EGY)	26.65	Neiry Mouradian (LIB)	27.16
400 metres	Karima Meskin Saad (EGY)	56.0	Sahar Touma (SYR)	63.4	Makzine Hussein (SYR)	65.7
800 metres	Ghada Shouaa (SYR)	2:14.7	Alia El Matari (JOR)	2:17.9	Mirvat Hamza (LIB)	2:33.9
1500 metres	Alia El Matari (JOR)	4:49.0	Amal El Matari (JOR)	4:49.3	Zainab Bakkour (SYR)	4:45.4
3000 metres	Amal El Matari (JOR)	10:52.2	Zainab Bakkour (SYR)	10:54.7	Rania Haydar (SYR)	11:18.9
100 metres hurdles	Ghada Shouaa (SYR)	14.44	Sheryne Khayri (EGY)	15.95	Fadia Othman (JOR)	18.98
4 × 100 m relay	Egypt (EGY)	49.10	Jordan (JOR)	50.81	Syria (SYR)	51.19
4 × 400 m relay	Egypt (EGY)	4:01.1	Jordan (JOR)	4:02.8	Lebanon (LIB)	4:27.3
10,000 m track walk	Dounia Kara-Hassoun (ALG)	55:32.34	Nagwa Ibrahim (EGY)	58:53.18	Ibtissem Zaouan (SYR)	1:05:17
High jump	Ghada Shouaa (SYR)	1.75 m	Souhed Haddad (JOR)	1.65 m	Ghada Anouar (EGY)	1.55 m
Long jump	Ghada Shouaa (SYR)	6.07 m	Nashoua Abdelhay (EGY)	5.76 m	Souhed Haddad (JOR)	5.60 m
Triple jump	Naïma Baraket (ALG)	12.04 m	Nashoua Abdelhay (EGY)	11.93 m	Souhed Haddad (JOR)	11.37 m
Shot put	Wafaa Ismail Baghdadi (EGY)	15.61 m	Hanan Ahmed Khaled (EGY)	14.38 m	Lamia Naouara (TUN)	13.41 m
Discus throw	Monia Kari (TUN)	49.16 m	Hanan Ahmed Khaled (EGY)	43.78 m	Janette Ayoub (LIB)	35.10 m
Javelin throw	Ghada Shouaa (SYR)	50.54 m	Zouhour Toumi (TUN)	49.30 m	Pauline Maqdassi (LIB)	38.78 m
Heptathlon	Sheryne Khayri (EGY)	3574 pts	Rola Hambersmian (SYR)	3166 pts	Genda Shaheen (PLE)	1290 pts

== Medal table ==
=== Overall ===
Rank	Nation	Gold	Silver	Bronze	Total
1	Qatar (QAT)	11	2	4	17
2	Egypt (EGY)	8	9	5	22
3	Syria	6	5	9	20
4	Algeria (ALG)	5	3	1	9
5	Tunisia (TUN)	4	5	3	12
6	Jordan (JOR)	2	5	5	12
7	Saudi Arabia (KSA)	2	5	3	10
8	Kuwait (KUW)	1	2	3	6
9	United Arab Emirates (UAE)	1	2	0	3
10	Lebanon (LIB)	0	1	5	6
11	Oman (OMN)	0	1	0	1
12	Bahrain (BHR)	0	0	1	1
12	Palestine (PLE)	0	0	1	1
14	Yemen (YEM)	0	0	0	0
Totals (14 entries)		40	40	40	120

=== Men ===
Rank	Nation	Gold	Silver	Bronze	Total
1	Qatar (QAT)	11	2	4	17
2	Tunisia (TUN)	3	4	2	9
3	Algeria (ALG)	3	3	1	7
4	Saudi Arabia (KSA)	2	5	3	10
5	Egypt (EGY)	1	2	4	7
6	Kuwait (KUW)	1	2	3	6
6	Syria	1	2	3	6
8	United Arab Emirates (UAE)	1	2	0	3
9	Oman (OMN)	0	1	0	1
10	Jordan (JOR)	0	0	2	2
11	Bahrain (BHR)	0	0	1	1
12	Lebanon (LIB)	0	0	0	0
12	Palestine (PLE)	0	0	0	0
12	Yemen (YEM)	0	0	0	0
Totals (14 entries)		23	23	23	69

=== Women ===
Rank	Nation	Gold	Silver	Bronze	Total
1	Egypt (EGY)	7	7	1	15
2	Syria	5	3	6	14
3	Jordan (JOR)	2	5	3	10
4	Algeria (ALG)	2	0	0	2
5	Tunisia (TUN)	1	1	1	3
6	Lebanon (LIB)	0	1	5	6
7	Palestine (PLE)	0	0	1	1
Totals (7 entries)		17	17	17	51
