= 1987 Arab Athletics Championships =

5th Arab Athletics Championships
- Dates: 6–9 July
- Host city: Algiers, Algeria
- Events: 40

The 1987 Arab Athletics Championships was the fifth edition of the international athletics competition between Arab countries. It took place in Algiers, Algeria from 6–9 July. A total of 40 athletics events were contested, 24 for men and 16 for women. The men's 20 kilometres walk was restored to the programme, having been removed after 1981. A men's 50 kilometres walk was also held for the first time.

== Medal summary ==
=== Men ===
Event	Gold		Silver		Bronze	
100 metres	Talal Mansour (QAT)	10.35	Mustapha Kamel Selmi (ALG)	10.49	Abdullah Salem Al Khalidi (OMN)	10.70
200 metres	Talal Mansour (QAT)	20.83	Mustapha Kamel Selmi (ALG)	21.06	Abdullah Salem Al Khalidi (OMN)	21.36
400 metres	Mohammed Al-Malki (OMN)	45.56	Ahmed Abdelhalim Ghanem (EGY)	46.61	Thamer Younes (IRQ)	46.67
800 metres	Faouzi Lahbi (MAR)	1:46.72	Saïd M'Hand (MAR)	1:46.16	Réda Abdenouz (ALG)	1:47.67
1500 metres	Rachid Kram (ALG)	3:43.10	Mustapha Lachaa (MAR)	3:44.58	Abderrahman Youbi (ALG)	3:45.91
5000 metres	Brahim Boutayeb (MAR)	13:45.58	Habib Romdhani (TUN)	13:57.66	Abderrazak Gtari (TUN)	14:22.30
10,000 metres	Miloud Djellal (ALG)	30:37.12	Abderrazak Gtari (TUN)	30:47.05	Abdelhak Henane (ALG)	30:54.83
110 metres hurdles	Naji Mohsin Ghazi (IRQ)	13.90	Noureddine Tadjine (ALG)	14.25	Ziad Abdulrazak Al-Kheder (KUW)	14.30
400 metres hurdles	Ahmed Abdelhalim Ghanem (EGY)	51.68	Nasser Mohamed (QAT)	52.24	Jasem Goma'an Al-Duaillah (KUW)	52.63
3000 metres steeplechase	Féthi Baccouche (TUN)	8:31.09	Rabah Aboura (ALG)	8:39.13	Brahim Ayachi (TUN)	8:42.86
4×100 m relay	Qatar (QAT)	39.71	Algeria (ALG)	40.46	Morocco (MAR)	41.12
4×400 m relay	Morocco (MAR)	3:09.46	Iraq (IRQ)	3:09.90	Algeria (ALG)	3:10.95
Marathon	Sid Ali Sakhri (ALG)	2:27:29	Arezki Hamadache (ALG)	2:28:36	Farouk Khadour (SYR)	2:38:49
20 km walk	Abdelwahab Ferguène (ALG)	1:30:39	Mohamed Bouhalla (ALG)	1:33:54	Saïd Megahed (EGY)	1:42:21
50 km walk	H'Mimed Rahouli (ALG)	4:32:32	Arezki Boumerar (ALG)	4:47:22	Mohamed Abdelmetwalli (EGY)	4:58:44
High jump	Othmane Belfaa (ALG)	2.20 m	Mohamed Aghlal (MAR)	2.13 m	Khalid Koughbar (MAR)	2.13 m
Pole vault	Sami Si Mohamed (ALG)	4.75 m	Choukri Abahnini (TUN)	4.70 m	Abdelatif Chekir (TUN)	4.65 m
Long jump	Abdulla Al-Sheib (QAT)	7.81 m	Mohamed El Aïd Zaghdoudi (TUN)	7.58 m	Lotfi Khaïda (ALG)	7.51 m
Triple jump	Hassan Badra (EGY)	16.10 m	Lotfi Khaïda (ALG)	15.71 m	Sameh Farhan (KUW)	15.68 m
Shot put	Ahmed Mohamed Ashoush (EGY)	17.99 m	Ahmed Kamel Shata (EGY)	17.79 m	Mohamed Al-Zinkawi (KUW)	17.03 m
Discus throw	Mohamed Naguib Hamed (EGY)	53.84 m	Hassan Ahmed Hamad (EGY)	53.36 m	Abderrazak Ben Hassine (TUN)	52.12 m
Hammer throw	Hakim Toumi (ALG)	70.18 m	Yacine Louail (ALG)	62.50 m	Waleed Al-Bekheet (KUW)	61.90 m
Javelin throw	Ghanem Jaouhar (KUW)	70.58 m	Ahmed Mahour Bacha (ALG)	69.04 m	Tarek Chaabani (TUN)	67.92 m
Decathlon	Ahmed Mahour Bacha (ALG)	7372 pts	Mahmoud Aït Ouhamou (ALG)	6749 pts	Abed Omar (QAT)	6682 pts

=== Women ===
Event	Gold		Silver		Bronze	
100 metres	Rachida Ferdjaoui (ALG)	12.05	Latifa Lahcen (MAR)	12.12	Mahdjouba Bouhdiba (ALG)	12.34
200 metres	Nawal El Moutawakel (MAR)	24.33	Latifa Lahcen (MAR)	25.26	Mahdjouba Bouhdiba (ALG)	25.44
400 metres	Nawal El Moutawakel (MAR)	54.28	Dina Saadoun (IRQ)	55.58	Hassiba Hallilou (ALG)	55.73
800 metres	Hassiba Boulmerka (ALG)	2:10.19	Mebarka Hadj Abdellah (ALG)	2:10.56	Hela Maghrabi (SYR)	2:12.60
1500 metres	Mebarka Hadj Abdellah (ALG)	4:30.25	Zahra Ouaziz (MAR)	4:31.71	Hassiba Boulmerka (ALG)	4:32.53
3000 metres	Nadia Ouaziz (MAR)	9:30.28	Zahra Ouaziz (MAR)	9:31.26	Malika Benhabylès (ALG)	9:32.37
100 metres hurdles	Yasmina Azzizi (ALG)	13.82	Nacera Zaaboub-Achir (ALG)	13.85	Nezha Bidouane (MAR)	14.72
400 metres hurdles	Nawal El Moutawakel (MAR)	59.93	Fatima Aouam (MAR)	61.29	Iman Abdulamir (IRQ)	61.48
4×100 m relay	Algeria (ALG)	46.62	Morocco (MAR)	47.65	Tunisia (TUN)	48.78
4×400 m relay	Morocco (MAR)	3:47.51	Algeria (ALG)	3:48.00	Iraq (IRQ)	3:51.24
High jump	Nacera Zaaboub-Achir (ALG)	1.75 m	Kawther Akrémi (TUN)	1.65 m	Touria Aboudi (MAR)	1.60 m
Long jump	Yasmina Azzizi (ALG)	5.86 m	Basma Gharbi (TUN)	5.83 m	Najwa Abdelmoula (TUN)	5.82 m
Shot put	Souad Malloussi (MAR)	15.90 m	Aïcha Dahmous (ALG)	13.86 m	Hanan Ahmed Khaled (EGY)	13.31 m
Discus throw	Aïcha Dahmous (ALG)	51.20 m	Zoubida Laayouni (MAR)	49.79 m	Nabila Mouelhi (TUN)	48.84 m
Javelin throw	Samia Djémaa (ALG)	53.58 m	Hayet Ben Slama (TUN)	42.80 m	Amel Hessine (EGY)	38.66 m
Heptathlon	Yasmina Azzizi (ALG)	5571 pts	Basma Gharbi (TUN)	4360 pts	Huda Hashem Ismail (EGY)	3822 pts

== Medal table ==
=== Overall ===
Rank	Nation	Gold	Silver	Bronze	Total
1	Algeria (ALG)	19	16	10	45
2	Morocco (MAR)	9	10	4	23
3	Egypt (EGY)	4	3	2	9
4	Qatar (QAT)	4	1	1	6
5	Tunisia (TUN)	1	8	8	17
6	Iraq (IRQ)	1	2	3	6
7	Kuwait (KUW)	1	0	5	6
8	Oman (OMN)	1	0	2	3
9	Lebanon (LIB)	0	0	3	3
10	Syria (SYR)	0	0	2	2
11	Bahrain (BHR)	0	0	0	0
11	Palestine (PLE)	0	0	0	0
11	Sudan (SUD)	0	0	0	0
11	United Arab Emirates (UAE)	0	0	0	0
11	Yemen (YEM)	0	0	0	0
Totals (15 entries)		40	40	40	120

=== Men ===
Rank	Nation	Gold	Silver	Bronze	Total
1	Algeria (ALG)	9	12	5	26
2	Egypt (EGY)	4	3	2	9
3	Qatar (QAT)	4	1	1	6
4	Morocco (MAR)	3	3	2	8
5	Tunisia (TUN)	1	4	5	10
6	Iraq (IRQ)	1	1	1	3
7	Kuwait (KUW)	1	0	5	6
8	Oman (OMN)	1	0	2	3
9	Syria	0	0	1	1
10	Bahrain (BHR)	0	0	0	0
10	Palestine (PLE)	0	0	0	0
10	Sudan (SUD)	0	0	0	0
10	United Arab Emirates (UAE)	0	0	0	0
10	Yemen (YEM)	0	0	0	0
Totals (14 entries)		24	24	24	72

=== Women ===
Rank	Nation	Gold	Silver	Bronze	Total
1	Algeria (ALG)	10	4	5	19
2	Morocco (MAR)	6	7	2	15
3	Tunisia (TUN)	0	4	3	7
4	Iraq (IRQ)	0	1	2	3
5	Lebanon (LIB)	0	0	3	3
6	Syria	0	0	1	1
Totals (6 entries)		16	16	16	48
