= 1989 Arab Athletics Championships =

6th Arab Athletics Championships
- Dates: 2–5 October
- Host city: Cairo, Egypt
- Events: 43

The 1989 Arab Athletics Championships was the sixth edition of the international athletics competition between Arab countries. It took place in Cairo, Egypt from 2–5 October. A total of 43 athletics events were contested, 24 for men and 19 for women. It was the first time that the Egyptian capital had hosted the event, bringing the championship to the largest Arab nation.

Due to technological restrictions, track events were timed to the tenth of a second, while road events were timed into hundredths. Women's full long-distance running events were added to the programme in the form of the 10,000 metres and the marathon (an Olympic women's 10,000 m had been introduced the previous year). The marathon was not the only new road event here, as a women's 10 km race walk was also initiated. It was the first Arab women's walk championship, as same event only started at the Pan Arab Games in 1992.

== Medal summary ==
=== Men ===
Event	Gold		Silver		Bronze	
100 metres	Khalid Jouma Ibrahim (BHR)	10.2	Abdullah Salem Al Khalidi (OMN)	10.3	Jassem Mahboob (QAT)	10.4
200 metres	Khalid Jouma Ibrahim (BHR)	20.7	Abdullah Salem Al Khalidi (OMN)	21.0	Ibrahim Ismail Muftah (QAT)	21.0
400 metres	Mohammed Al-Malki (OMN)	45.56	Ibrahim Ismail Muftah (QAT)	46.61	Abdelali Kasbane (MAR)	46.67
800 metres	Ahmed Belkessam (ALG)	1:52.8	Rachid El Basir (MAR)	1:53.1	Bouazza Nouala (ALG)	1:53.2
1500 metres	Mustapha Lachaal (MAR)	3:41.0	Abdelaziz Sahere (MAR)	3:41.5	Mahmoud Kalboussi (TUN)	3:41.7
5000 metres	Brahim Boutayeb (MAR)	14:05.7	Khalid Skah (MAR)	14:07.	Habib Romdhani (TUN)	14:10.7
10,000 metres	Brahim Boutayeb (MAR)	29:42.5	Hammou Boutayeb (MAR)	29:43.7	Abderrazak Gtari (TUN)	29:57.3
110 metres hurdles	Noureddine Tadjine (ALG)	13.7	Ziad Abdulrazak Al-Kheder (KUW)	14.0	Khalid Abdallah (BHR)	14.0
400 metres hurdles	Ahmed Abdel Halim Ghanem (EGY)	50.3	Said Aberkan (MAR)	50.8	Abdelhak Touhami (MAR)	50.8
3000 metres steeplechase	Azzedine Brahmi (ALG)	8:54.4	Hassan Ouhrouch (MAR)	8:54.4	Mohamed Suleiman (QAT)	8:54.4
4 × 100 m relay	Algeria (ALG)	40.8	Egypt (EGY)	41.2	Bahrain (BHR)	41.3
4 × 400 m relay	Morocco (MAR)	3:08.8	Oman (OMN); Sulaiman Khamis Al Habsi; Abdullah Salem Al Khalidi; Abdullah Al Anbari; Mohammed Amer Al Malki	3:09.5	Algeria (ALG)	3:09.6
Marathon	Mohamed El Amine (ALG)	2:21:57	Moussa Al-Hariri (SYR)	2:32:12	Abdelkarim Abbes (IRQ)	2:35:32
20 km walk	Mohamed Bouhalla (ALG)	1:48:42	Abdelouaheb Ferguène (ALG)	1:51:52	Ahmed Abdelhamid (EGY)	1:56:53
50 km walk	H'Mimed Rahouli (ALG)	4:58:32	Mustapha Boulal (MAR)	5:10:15	Arezki Boumerar (ALG)	5:31:14
High jump	Othmane Belfaa (ALG)	2.16 m	Abdulla Al-Sheib (QAT)	2.16 m	Karim Abdennour (ALG)	2.06 m
Pole vault	Walid Zayed (QAT)	4.80 m	Ahmed Kassem (QAT)	4.80 m	Choukri Abahnini (TUN)	4.70 m
Long jump	Youssef Sayed Mohamed Awad (EGY)	7.59 m	Ahmed Hassan (EGY)	7.44 m	Abdulla Al-Sheib (QAT)	7.36 m
Triple jump	Marzouk Abdallah Al-Yoha (KUW)	16.68 m	Abdelkader Kellouch (ALG)	16.03 m	Sameh Farhan (KUW)	15.41 m
Shot put	Ahmed Mohamed Ashoush (EGY)	18.29 m	Khaled Wajih (IRQ)	17.47 m	Khaled Suliman Al-Khalidi (KSA)	17.16 m
Discus throw	Mohamed Naguib Hamed (EGY)	55.44 m	Hassan Ahmed Hamad (EGY)	53.59 m	Ibrahim El-Ouairan (KSA)	49.76 m
Hammer throw	Hakim Toumi (ALG)	69.64 m	Waleed Al-Bekheet (KUW)	67.80 m	Hassan Chahine (MAR)	67.30 m
Javelin throw	Ghanem Jaouhar (KUW)	70.02 m	Ahmed Houri (SYR)	62.54 m	Abdeladhim Aliouat (KSA)	58.44 m
Decathlon	Abdennacer Moumen (MAR)	7215 pts	Mourad Mahour Bacha (ALG)	7168 pts	Mashal Douihi (KUW)	6701 pts

=== Women ===
Event	Gold		Silver		Bronze	
100 metres	Yasmina Azzizi (ALG)	11.8	Méryem Oumezdi (MAR)	11.9	Karima Meskin Saad (EGY)	12.0
200 metres	Karima Meskin Saad (EGY)	23.8	Wafa Bashir Asr (EGY)	24.5	Latifa Lahcen (MAR)	24.8
400 metres	Dina Saadoun (IRQ)	54.7	Karima Meskin Saad (EGY)	54.8	Hend Kebaoui (TUN)	56.2
800 metres	Hassiba Boulmerka (ALG)	2:08.19	Fatima Maama (MAR)	2:10.5	Najat Ouali (MAR)	2:15.3
1500 metres	Fatima Aouam (MAR)	4:21.9	Fatima Maama (MAR)	4:26.9	Mebarka Hadj Abdellah (ALG)	4:30.4
3000 metres	Fatima Aouam (MAR)	9:23.9	Mebarka Hadj Abdellah (ALG)	9:26.8	Souad Nakour (MAR)	9:41.8
10,000 metres	Hassania Drami (MAR)	34:55.6	Souad Nakour (MAR)	35:32.7	Mebarka Hadj Abdellah (ALG)	36:23.6
100 metres hurdles	Yasmina Azzizi (ALG)	13.4	Nezha Bidouane (MAR)	14.0	Fatima Najjam (MAR)	14.0
400 metres hurdles	Dina Saadoun (IRQ)	58.8	Hend Kabaoui (TUN)	59.0	Nezha Bidouane (MAR)	60.3
4 × 100 m relay	Morocco (MAR)	47.0	Egypt (EGY)	47.3	Algeria (ALG)	47.7
4 × 400 m relay	Morocco (MAR)	3:44.3	Egypt (EGY)	3:51.5	Tunisia (TUN)	3:54.9
Marathon	Zahra Akrachi (MAR)	4:23:01	Asma Larbi (TUN)	4:28:48	Only two finishers	
10 km walk	Amani Adel (EGY)	1:03:13	Méryem Kouch (MAR)	1:06:30	Messaouda Fridji (ALG)	1:09:43
High jump	Yasmina Azzizi (ALG)	1.73 m	Nacera Zaaboub-Achir (ALG)	1.67 m	Nadia Htitou (MAR)	1.67 m
Long jump	Hend Kabaoui (TUN)	5.62 m	Yasmina Azzizi (ALG)	5.61 m	Nagwa Abd El Hay Riad (EGY)	5.60 m
Shot put	Hanan Ahmed Khaled (EGY)	15.00 m	Aïcha Dahmous (ALG)	14.08 m	Latifa Nefzaoui (TUN)	13.75 m
Discus throw	Hanan Ahmed Khaled (EGY)	53.46 m	Zoubida Laayouni (MAR)	52.12 m	Nabila Mouelhi (TUN)	47.08 m
Javelin throw	Yasmina Azzizi (ALG)	51.08 m	Hayet Ben Slama (TUN)	47.40 m	Rkia Ramoudi (MAR)	47.24 m
Heptathlon	Nacera Zaaboub-Achir (ALG)	5553 pts	Huda Hashem Ismail (EGY)	4478 pts	Hédia Zalila (TUN)	4421 pts

== Medal table ==
=== Overall ===
Rank	Nation	Gold	Silver	Bronze	Total
1	Algeria (ALG)	15	7	8	30
2	Morocco (MAR)	11	14	10	35
3	Egypt (EGY)	8	8	3	19
4	Kuwait (KUW)	2	2	2	6
5	Iraq (IRQ)	2	1	1	4
6	Bahrain (BHR)	2	0	2	4
7	Tunisia (TUN)	1	3	9	13
8	Qatar (QAT)	1	3	4	8
9	Oman (OMN)	1	3	0	4
10	Syria	0	2	0	2
11	Saudi Arabia (KSA)	0	0	3	3
12	Jordan (JOR)	0	0	0	0
12	Palestine (PLE)	0	0	0	0
12	Sudan (SUD)	0	0	0	0
12	United Arab Emirates (UAE)	0	0	0	0
12	Yemen (YEM)	0	0	0	0
Totals (16 entries)		43	43	42	128

=== Men ===
Rank	Nation	Gold	Silver	Bronze	Total
1	Algeria (ALG)	9	3	4	16
2	Morocco (MAR)	5	7	3	15
3	Egypt (EGY)	4	3	1	8
4	Kuwait (KUW)	2	2	2	6
5	Bahrain (BHR)	2	0	2	4
6	Qatar (QAT)	1	3	4	8
7	Oman (OMN)	1	3	0	4
8	Syria	0	2	0	2
9	Iraq (IRQ)	0	1	1	2
10	Tunisia (TUN)	0	0	4	4
11	Saudi Arabia (KSA)	0	0	3	3
12	Jordan (JOR)	0	0	0	0
12	Palestine (PLE)	0	0	0	0
12	Sudan (SUD)	0	0	0	0
12	United Arab Emirates (UAE)	0	0	0	0
12	Yemen (YEM)	0	0	0	0
Totals (16 entries)		24	24	24	72

=== Women ===
Rank	Nation	Gold	Silver	Bronze	Total
1	Morocco (MAR)	6	7	7	20
2	Algeria (ALG)	6	4	4	14
3	Egypt (EGY)	4	5	2	11
4	Iraq (IRQ)	2	0	0	2
5	Tunisia (TUN)	1	3	5	9
6	Jordan (JOR)	0	0	0	0
6	Syria	0	0	0	0
Totals (7 entries)		19	19	18	56
