= 1995 Arab Athletics Championships =

9th Arab Athletics Championships
- Dates: 26–28 August
- Host city: Cairo, Egypt
- Events: 45

The 1995 Arab Athletics Championships was the ninth edition of the international athletics competition between Arab countries. It took place in Cairo, Egypt from 26 to 28 August. A total of 45 athletics events were contested, 25 for men and 20 for women.

The men's marathon was held for the last time, and for the only time both this and the half marathon event featured on the programme together – a rarity for an athletics championship. The men's 50 kilometres race walk was briefly reintroduced, being contested for the third and final time in the competition's history. In the women's programme, the triple jump was held for the first time, following on from its global debut at the 1993 World Championships in Athletics. In a similar match with international standards, the women's 3000 metres was changed to 5000 metres (parity with the men's event) – a move seen earlier that month at the 1995 World Championships in Athletics. The women's 10,000 metres and half marathon both returned to the programme, having been absent since 1989.

== Medal summary ==
=== Men ===
Event	Gold		Silver		Bronze	
100 metres (wind: +1.6 m/s)	Saad Muftah Al-Kuwari (QAT)	10.37	Mohamed Masoud Salem (KSA)	10.37	Jassim Abbas (QAT)	10.42
200 metres	Ibrahim Ismail Muftah (QAT)	21.03	Mohammad Seif (KSA)	21.44	Sultan Mohamed Al-Sheib (QAT)	21.55
400 metres	Ibrahim Ismail Muftah (QAT)	45.24	Hashem El-Shorfa (KSA)	47.22	Mohammed Al-Beshi (KSA)	47.86
800 metres	Ali Hakimi (TUN)	1:47.16	Benyounés Lahlou (MAR)	1:47.73	Abdul Rahman Hassan (QAT)	1:48.83
1500 metres	Mohamed Suleiman (QAT)	3:49.06	Azzeddine Seddiki (MAR)	3:49.36	Driss Maazouzi (MAR)	3:50.63
5000 metres	Mohamed Issangar (MAR)	13:56.73	Alyan Sultan Al-Qahtani (KSA)	13:57.89	Ahmed Ibrahim Warsama (QAT)	14:05.21
10,000 metres	Alyan Sultan Al-Qahtani (KSA)	29:27.03	Mustapha Bamouh (MAR)	29:31.08	Mokhtar Hizaoui (TUN)	29:40.07
110 metres hurdles	Mubarak Khasif (QAT)	13.94	Hamad Mubarak Al-Dosari (QAT)	14.20	Mohamed Mohamed Samy (EGY)	14.27
400 metres hurdles	Hadi Soua'an Al-Somaily (KSA)	49.30	Mubarak Al-Nubi (QAT)	50.17	Fadhel Khayati (TUN)	50.39
3000 metres steeplechase	Irba Lakhal (MAR)	8:40.72	Jamal Abdi Hassan (QAT)	8:42.54	Ibrahim Dahman El Essiri (KSA)	8:47.63
4 × 100 m relay	Saudi Arabia (KSA)	39.92	Qatar (QAT)	39.92	Egypt (EGY)	40.93
4 × 400 m relay	Saudi Arabia (KSA)	3:04.29	Qatar (QAT)	3:05.64	Kuwait (KUW)	3:12.60
Half marathon	Mokhtar Hizaoui (TUN)	1:07:34	Abdallah Youssef (QAT)	1:19:10	Mohamed Saïd Mouradi (MAR)	1:20:58
Marathon	Abdelkader El Mouaziz (MAR)	2:25:30	Abderrahman Ben Redhouan (MAR)	2:32:32	Salama Abdelkarim (JOR)	2:42:43
20 km walk	Hatem Ghoula (TUN)	1:37:50	Mohieddine Beni Daoud (TUN)	1:38:20	Hamed Farag Abd El Jalil (EGY)	1:41:33
50 km walk	Hichem Sayed Ahmed (EGY)	5:04:34	Atef Sayed Ahmed (EGY)	5:12:18	Yasser Ali Dib (PLE)	5:59:57
High jump	Yacine Mousli (ALG)	2.14 m	Mohamed Saïd Nekrouni (QAT) Fakhredin Fouad (JOR)	2.12 m	Not awarded	
Pole vault	Ahmed Abdulkarim (QAT)	5.05 m	Ahmed Abu Zeyd (EGY)	5.05 m	Samah Hassan Ferid (EGY)	4.90 m
Long jump	Abdul Rahman Al-Nubi (QAT)	7.74 m	Anis Gallali (TUN)	7.61 m	Ahmed Houdaib Bashir (OMN)	7.57 m
Triple jump	Mohamed Karim Sassi (TUN)	16.57 m	Marzouk Abdallah Al-Yoha (KUW)	16.29 m	Salem Al-Ahmedi (KSA)	15.99 m
Shot put	Bilal Saad Mubarak (QAT)	19.31 m	Dhia Kamel Ahmed (EGY)	17.23 m	Khaled Suliman Al-Khalidi (KSA)	17.18 m
Discus throw	Khaled Suliman Al-Khalidi (KSA)	55.48 m	Abdel Ilah Saïd Esheâïli (KSA)	54.72 m	Dhia Kamel Ahmed (EGY)	52.04 m
Hammer throw	Cherif El Hennawi (EGY)	71.46 m	Naser Abdullah Al-Jarallah (KUW)	67.08 m	Waleed Al-Bekheet (KUW)	66.10 m
Javelin throw	Ghanem Jaouhar (KUW)	71.66 m	Maher Ridane (TUN)	70.96 m	Khaled Yassine (EGY)	65.52 m
Decathlon	Sid Ali Sabour (ALG)	7355 pts	Anis Riahi (TUN)	7341 pts	Houssem Abdellatif (EGY)	6761 pts

=== Women ===
Event	Gold		Silver		Bronze	
100 metres	Nezha Bidouane (MAR)	11.78	Latifa Lahcen (MAR)	11.93	Soussy Naqshaban (ALG)	11.95
200 metres	Nezha Bidouane (MAR)	23.87	Latifa Lahcen (MAR)	24.07	Hend Kebaoui (TUN)	25.11
400 metres	Hend Kebaoui (TUN)	54.51	Nadia Zetouani (MAR)	54.90	Amel Haddad (ALG)	57.70
800 metres	Nouria Mérah-Benida (ALG)	2:05.52	Sabah Ben Nasr-Cherif (TUN)	2:07.41	Samira Raif (MAR)	2:08.26
1500 metres	Souad Kouhaïl (MAR)	4:28.11	Sabah Ben Nasr-Cherif (TUN)	4:29.92	Bouchra Ben Thami (MAR)	4:30.92
5000 metres	Zahra Ouaziz (MAR)	15:56.2	Leila Bendahmane (ALG)	16:13.2	Souad Kouhaïl (MAR)	16:32.0
10,000 metres	Zahra Ouaziz (MAR)	36:53.19	Nesria Baghdad (ALG)	37:54.34	Amal El Matari (JOR)	40:47.88
100 metres hurdles	Nezha Bidouane (MAR)	13.44	Ahlam Allali (ALG)	14.95	Fatima Zahra Dkouk (MAR)	18.98
400 metres hurdles	Nezha Bidouane (MAR)	56.96	Hend Kebaoui (TUN)	57.84	Nadia Zetouani (MAR)	57.91
4 × 100 m relay	Morocco (MAR)	47.10	Algeria (ALG)	47.96	Egypt (EGY)	48.70
4 × 400 m relay	Morocco (MAR)	4:40.97	Algeria (ALG)	4:43.73	Egypt (EGY)	4:58.12
Half marathon	Leila Bendahmane (ALG)	1:20:05	Sonia Agoun (TUN)	1:35:35	Fatiha Klileche (ALG)	1:36:46
10,000 m track walk	Dounia Kara-Hassoun (ALG)	51:11.3	Nagwa Ibrahim (EGY)	52:23.8	Nabila Yassia (ALG)	54:16.9
High jump	Ghada Shouaa (SYR)	1.80 m	Nacera Zaaboub-Achir (ALG)	1.67 m	Selma Achour (TUN)	1.65 m
Long jump	Ghada Shouaa (SYR)	6.64 m	Hend Kebaoui (TUN)	?	Hasna Ati Allah (MAR)	?
Triple jump	Hasna Ati Allah (MAR)	12.79 m	Naïma Baraket (ALG)	12.44 m	Samia Guesmi (TUN)	12.13 m
Shot put	Fouzia Fatihi (MAR)	15.62 m	Hanan Ahmed Khaled (EGY)	15.14 m	Wafaa Ismail Baghdadi (EGY)	15.12 m
Discus throw	Monia Kari (TUN)	53.50 m	Latifa Allem (EGY)	?	Zoubida Laayouni (MAR)	?
Javelin throw	Ghada Shouaa (SYR)	53.72 m	Zouhour Toumi (TUN)	50.74 m	Malika Hammou (ALG)	40.86 m
Heptathlon	Nacera Zaaboub-Achir (ALG)	4806 pts	Sheryne Khayri (EGY)	4378 pts	Only two finishers	

== Medal table ==
=== Overall ===
Rank	Nation	Gold	Silver	Bronze	Total
1	Morocco (MAR)	14	8	10	32
2	Qatar (QAT)	8	7	4	19
3	Tunisia (TUN)	6	10	5	21
4	Algeria (ALG)	6	7	4	17
5	Saudi Arabia (KSA)	5	5	4	14
6	Syria	3	0	0	3
7	Egypt (EGY)	2	6	10	18
8	Kuwait (KUW)	1	2	2	5
9	Jordan (JOR)	0	1	2	3
10	Oman (OMN)	0	0	1	1
10	Palestine (PLE)	0	0	1	1
12	Bahrain (BHR)	0	0	0	0
12	Lebanon (LIB)	0	0	0	0
12	Sudan (SUD)	0	0	0	0
12	United Arab Emirates (UAE)	0	0	0	0
Totals (15 entries)		45	46	43	134

=== Men ===
Rank	Nation	Gold	Silver	Bronze	Total
1	Qatar (QAT)	8	7	4	19
2	Saudi Arabia (KSA)	5	5	4	14
3	Tunisia (TUN)	4	4	2	10
4	Morocco (MAR)	3	4	2	9
5	Egypt (EGY)	2	3	7	12
6	Algeria (ALG)	2	0	0	2
7	Kuwait (KUW)	1	2	2	5
8	Jordan (JOR)	0	1	1	2
9	Oman (OMN)	0	0	1	1
9	Palestine (PLE)	0	0	1	1
11	Bahrain (BHR)	0	0	0	0
11	Lebanon (LIB)	0	0	0	0
11	Sudan (SUD)	0	0	0	0
11	Syria	0	0	0	0
11	United Arab Emirates (UAE)	0	0	0	0
Totals (15 entries)		25	26	24	75

=== Women ===
Rank	Nation	Gold	Silver	Bronze	Total
1	Morocco (MAR)	11	4	8	23
2	Algeria (ALG)	4	7	4	15
3	Syria	3	0	0	3
4	Tunisia (TUN)	2	6	3	11
5	Egypt (EGY)	0	3	3	6
6	Jordan (JOR)	0	0	1	1
7	Lebanon (LIB)	0	0	0	0
Totals (7 entries)		20	20	19	59
