= Waleed Al-Bekheet =

Kuwaiti hammer thrower (born 1965)

Waleed Saleh Al-Bekheet
Personal information
- Nationality: Kuwait
- Born: 4 April 1965 (age 61) Kuwait
- Height: 1.90 m (6 ft 3 in)
- Weight: 98 kg (216 lb)

Sport
- Sport: Athletics
- Event: Hammer throw
- Club: Qadsia Sports Club
Medal record
Men's athletics
Representing Kuwait
Asian Championships
Silver medal – second place	1985 Jakarta	Hammer throw
Bronze medal – third place	1991 Kuala Lumpur	Hammer throw
Arab Championships
Gold medal – first place	1993 Latakia	Hammer throw
Silver medal – second place	1989 Cairo	Hammer throw
Silver medal – second place	1991 Latakia	Hammer throw
Bronze medal – third place	1987 Algiers	Hammer throw
Bronze medal – third place	1995 Cairo	Hammer throw
Gulf Championships
Gold medal – first place	1988 Doha	Hammer throw
Gold medal – first place	1992 Riyadh	Hammer throw
Gold medal – first place	1994 Doha	Hammer throw
Gold medal – first place	1996 Kuwait City	Hammer throw
Arab Junior Championships
Gold medal – first place	1984 Casablanca	Hammer throw

Waleed Saleh Al-Bekheet (Arabic: وليد صالح البخيت; born 4 April 1965) is a Kuwaiti former hammer thrower who competed at the 1988 and 1992 Summer Olympics, finishing in 27th and 25th, respectively. He is the 1993 Arab champion, and later competed at the 1995 World Championships in Gothenburg.

He later became an assistant throwing coach with the Kuwait Athletics Federation in 1999.

== Personal best ==
- Hammer throw – 69.42 m (1989, Kuwait City)
