= Hamed Sadeq =

Kuwaiti sprinter

Personal information
- Born: December 18, 1971 (age 54)
Medal record
Men's athletics
Representing Kuwait
GCC Championships
Gold medal – first place	1996 Kuwait City	100 m
Bronze medal – third place	1996 Kuwait City	200 m

Hamed Habib Sadeq (Arabic: حامد حبيب صادق; born 18 December 1971) is a former Kuwaiti sprinter who competed in the men's 100 metres at the 1996 Summer Olympics.

At the 1996 Gulf Cooperation Council Athletics Championships in Kuwait City, Sadeq ran 10.36 seconds to win the 100 m gold medal and 21.04 seconds to win the 200 m bronze medal. His 100 m time broke the Kuwaiti record and remained the national record until it was broken by Meshaal Khalifa Al-Mutairi in 2015.

Sadeq was selected to represent Kuwait in the 100 metres at the 1996 Olympics. Seeded in the 12th heat, he ran 10.81 seconds to place 6th and did not advance to the quarter-finals.

The following year, Sadeq qualified in the 60 metres at the 1997 IAAF World Indoor Championships. He ran 6.92 seconds to place 5th in the third heat, failing to advance. Sadeq also competed in outdoor championships in 1997.

Sadeq competed at the 1999 Arab Athletics Championships, where he ran 10.52 seconds to win his 100 m first-round heat. He qualified for the next round, but did not start.
