= Mohamed Al-Nahdi =

Emirati middle-distance runner

Personal information
- Born: 23 April 1967 (age 59) United Arab Emirates
- Height: 175 cm (5 ft 9 in)
- Weight: 70 kg (154 lb)

Sport
- Country: United Arab Emirates
- Sport: Middle-distance running
Medal record
Men's athletics
Representing the United Arab Emirates
Arab Athletics Championships
Silver medal – second place	1993 Latakia	5000 m
Silver medal – second place	1993 Latakia	3000 m s'chase
Asian Athletics Championships
Bronze medal – third place	1993 Manila	5000 m

Mohamed Al-Nahdi is an Emirati Olympic middle-distance runner. He represented his country in the men's 1500 meters at the 1992 Summer Olympics.

In July 1992, Al-Nahdi ran 8:13.88 for 3000 m at a meeting in Betzdorf, Germany, setting the still-standing Emirati national record. Following that performance at the Olympics, Al-Nahdi ran 3:48.08 for 1500 m to finish 10th in his heat. Later that year, Al-Nahdi ran 3:47.06 at a meeting in Dortmund, Germany to set another Emirati record, which stood until Abdulkerim Teki Abdurahman broke it in 2024.

In August 1993, Al-Nahdi set the 3000 metres steeplechase national record at a meeting in Hamburg, running 8:35.64. In September, he won silver medals at the 1993 Arab Athletics Championships in both the 5000 m and 3000 m steeplechase. Three months later at the 1993 Asian Athletics Championships, Al-Nahdi won the 5000 m bronze medal, also setting his fourth national record in 13:49.74.

Al-Nahdi returned to international competition in 1997, setting his final national record over the 10,000 metres in a time of 30:04.1 at a meeting in Västerås, Sweden. He also joined the Emirati team in the short race at the 1998 World Cross Country Championships, finishing 57th overall.

In 2021, Al-Nahdi appealed to the UAE Athletics Federation for a chance to coach the national athletics team, which he claimed had been underperforming. He said in Arabic, "The records registered in my name and recorded in the records of the Athletics Federation have not been broken for more than 20 years in my participation in championships in Germany, Manila, Sweden and others... I demand that I be given the opportunity to coach the national teams". He specifically was concerned about the coaching of Saud Al-Zaabi, who narrowly missed qualification for the 2021 Summer Olympics.
