= Mostafa Lachal =

Moroccan middle-distance runner

Personal information
- Nationality: Moroccan
- Born: 10 February 1964 (age 62) Morocco
- Height: 172 cm (5 ft 8 in)
- Weight: 58 kg (128 lb)

Sport
- Country: Morocco
- Sport: Middle-distance running
Medal record
Men's athletics
Representing Morocco
African Championships
| Bronze medal – third place | 1988 Annaba | 1500 m |
Mediterranean Games
| Bronze medal – third place | 1987 Latakia | 4x400m relay |

Mostafa Lachal is a retired Moroccan Olympic middle-distance runner. He represented his country in the men's 1500 meters at the 1992 Summer Olympics. His time was a 3:39.20 in the first heat, and a 3:45.65 in the semifinals.

He won two medals, silver in 800 and bronze in 1500 metres, at the inaugural 1984 Arab Junior Championships. In the 1500 metres he then finished eighth at the 1987 Mediterranean Games, won the bronze medals at the 1988 African Championships and 1989 Jeux de la Francophonie, and the gold medal at the 1989 Arab Championships. He became Moroccan champion in the 800 metres in 1985, and in the 1500 metres in 1985, 1986 and 1987.

His personal best times were 3:35.78 minutes in the 1500 metres, achieved in July 1988 in Verona; 7:53.01 minutes in the 3000 metres, achieved in June 1990 in Reims; and 13:48.59 minutes in the 5000 metres, achieved in April 1991 in Palermo.
