= Abdullah Salem Al-Khalidi =

Omani sprinter

Personal information
- Nationality: Omani
- Born: 1 March 1958 (age 68)

Sport
- Sport: Sprinting
- Event: 100 metres
Medal record
Men's athletics
Representing Oman
Arab Championships
Bronze medal – third place	1987 Algiers	100 m
Bronze medal – third place	1987 Algiers	200 m
Silver medal – second place	1989 Cairo	100 m
Silver medal – second place	1989 Cairo	200 m
Silver medal – second place	1989 Cairo	4 × 400 m relay

Abdullah Salem Al-Khalidi (Arabic: عبدالله سالم الخالدي / عبد الله سالم الخالدي; born 1 March 1958) is an Omani sprinter. He was a five-time Arab Athletics Championships medalist, and he also competed in the men's 100 metres, 200 metres, and 4 × 400 metres relay at the 1988 Summer Olympics before competing in the 200 metres at the 1992 Summer Olympics.

== Career ==
Al-Khalidi won bronze medals in the 100 m and 200 m at the 1987 Arab Athletics Championships. His final times were 10.70 seconds and 21.36 seconds respectively.

In the 1988 Olympic 100 m and 200 m races, Al-Khalidi ran 10.90 seconds and 21.82 seconds to place 4th and 6th in his heats respectively. He also ran third leg for the Omani 4 × 400 m team that split 3:12.89 minutes for 7th in their heat.

Al-Khalidi set his personal best over 100 m, 200 m, and 400 m in 1989. On 2 October, he ran 10.2 seconds to win the second 100 m heat at the 1989 Arab Athletics Championships. He went on to run 10.3 seconds in the finals to win the silver medal, alongside silver medals in the 200 m and 4 × 400 m relay. His 200 m time of 21.0 seconds in the finals was also a personal best. At a separate meet in 1989, he ran 48.91 seconds over 400 m to set a personal best at that distance.

Al Khalidi also competed in an athletics competition in December 1990.

He was seeded in the 5th 200 metres heat at the 1992 Olympics. He ran 22.48 seconds into a headwind to place 8th in his heat and did not advance.
