= Mahmoud Al-Kheirat =

Syrian javelin thrower

Personal information
- Native name: محمود الخيرات
- Nationality: Syrian
- Born: 16 September 1970 (age 55) Damascus, Syria

Sport
- Country: Syria
- Sport: Athletics
- Event(s): 800 m, 1500 m

Achievements and titles
- Personal bests: 800 m (outdoor): 1:47.45 NR (Esch-sur-Alzette 1998); 800 m (indoor): 1:50.02 NiR (New York 2002)
Medal record
Men's athletics
Representing Syria
Asian Championships
Bronze medal – third place	1998 Fukuoka	800 m
Pan Arab Games
Bronze medal – third place	1997 Beirut	800 m
Arab Championships
Silver medal – second place	1993 Latakia	800 m
Bronze medal – third place	1991 Latakia	800 m
Bronze medal – third place	1991 Latakia	1500 m

Mahmoud Al-Kheirat (Arabic: محمود الخيرات; born 16 September 1970) is a Syrian retired middle-distance runner and athlete. Al-Kheirat won a bronze medal in 800 m at the 1998 Asian Athletics Championships held in Fukuoka. He is also a multiple medalist from the Pan Arab Games and Arab Championships. He represented Syria three times during his career at the World Athletics Indoor Championships. He is the current Syrian record holder of the outdoor 800 m, 1500 m and indoor 800 metres events.

== Personal bests ==
Outdoor

- 800 m – 1:47.45 NR (Esch-sur-Alzette 1998)
- 1500 m – 3:48.12 NR (Beirut 1999)

Indoor

- 800 m – 1:50.02 NiR (New York 2002)

== Competition record ==
Year	Competition	Venue	Position	Event	Notes
Representing Syria
1991	Arab Championships	Latakia, Syria	3rd	800 m	1:49.9
1991	Arab Championships	Latakia, Syria	3rd	1500 m	3:55.7
1993	Arab Championships	Latakia, Syria	2nd	800 m	1:47.9
1995	World Indoor Championships	Barcelona, Spain	22nd (q)	800 m	1:53.12
1995	World Championships	Göteborg, Sweden	31st (q)	800 m	1:48.76
1997	Pan Arab Games	Beirut, Lebanon	3rd	800 m	1:49.17
1998	Asian Championships	Fukuoka, Japan	3rd	800 m	1:48.16
1998	Asian Games	Bangkok, Thailand	5th	800 m	1:48.33
2001	World Indoor Championships	Lisbon, Portugal	15th (q)	800 m	1:50.71

== Major victories ==
Outdoor

- 2002 Sacramento PA Championships 800 m - 1:51.02
- 2002 Long Beach Socal USATF Ch. 800 m - 1:50.13

Indoor

- 2001 Lincoln Wolf Pack Inv. 800 m - 1:50.83
- 2001 Los Angeles Invitational 800 m - 1:52.39 (3rd)
- 2002 Los Angeles Invitational 800 m - 1:54.23 (4th)
- 2003 New York Armory Open 800 m - 1:51.77 (4th)
