= 1991 Arab Athletics Championships =

7th Arab Athletics Championships
- Dates: 1–4 October
- Host city: Latakia, Syria
- Events: 39

The 1991 Arab Athletics Championships was the seventh edition of the international athletics competition between Arab countries. It took place in Latakia, Syria from 1–4 October. A total of 39 athletics events were contested, 23 for men and 16 for women.

The marathon race was held on a short course in Latakia, and was ultimately dropped at the following edition. The men's 50 kilometres race walk (introduced in 1987) was removed from the programme, while the women's 100 metres hurdles was not held due to a lack of entries. The women's 10,000 metres and marathon, which were held in 1989, did not return on this occasion.

== Medal summary ==
=== Men ===
Event	Gold		Silver		Bronze	
100 metres	Talal Mansour (QAT)	10.30	Khalid Jouma Ibrahim (BHR)	10.46	Ahmad Ouda Yad (EGY)	10.70
200 metres	Khalid Jouma Ibrahim (BHR)	21.15	Saad Muftah Al-Kuwari (QAT)	21.30	Ahmad Ouda Yad (EGY)	21.50
400 metres	Ibrahim Ismail Muftah (QAT)	46.4	Abdallah El-Eneizi (OMN)	47.8	Sami Suleiman Srour (QAT)	48.1
800 metres	Mohamed Ismail Youssef (QAT)	1:48.9	Hassan Abu Najem (JOR)	1:49.9	Mahmoud Al-Kheirat (SYR)	1:49.9
1500 metres	Mohamed Suleiman (QAT)	3:50.4	Salah Moustafa Habib (SYR)	3:55.6	Mahmoud Al-Kheirat (SYR)	3:55.7
5000 metres	Ahmed Ibrahim Warsama (QAT)	15:8.1	Awwad Sraiss (JOR)	15:8.8	Salah Moustafa Habib (SYR)	15:11.1
10,000 metres	Ahmed Ibrahim Warsama (QAT)	31:22.9	Awwad Sraiss (JOR)	31:23.8	Mousa Al-Hariri (SYR)	31:26.7
110 metres hurdles	Khaireddine Obeid (SYR)	14.05	Rashed Shibane (QAT)	14.19	Ziad Abdulrazak Al-Kheder (KUW)	14.37
400 metres hurdles	Zid Abou Hamed (SYR)	50.27	Suleiman Houeila (SYR)	50.51	Nasser Mohamed (QAT)	52.62
3000 metres steeplechase	Salah Moustafa Habib (SYR)	8:43.94	Mohammed al-Dosari (KSA)	8:51.95	Mohamed Saoud (SYR)	9:15.06
4×100 m relay	Qatar (QAT)	40.30	Saudi Arabia (KSA)	41.50	Kuwait (KUW)	42.20
4×400 m relay	Qatar (QAT)	3:13.7	Oman (OMN)	3:18.2	Syria (SYR)	3:20.8
Marathon^{[nb]}	Moussa Al-Hariri (SYR)	2:14:52	Khalaf El Abd (SYR)	?	Ahmed El Hamshari (JOR)	?
20 km walk	Magid Turki (SYR)	1:52:23	Haythem Assaf (SYR)	1:54:27	Aouad Essayar (JOR)	2:)2:63
High jump	Fakhredin Fouad (JOR)	2.16 m	Abdulla Al-Sheib (QAT)	2.13 m	Fahd Mansour (KUW)	2.00 m
Pole vault	Walid Zayed (QAT)	4.60 m	Ibrahim Nasser (UAE)	4.40 m	Only two finishers	
Long jump	Musbah Ali Saeed (UAE)	7.61 m	Mohamed Abdelkader (EGY)	7.52 m	Abdulla Al-Sheib (QAT)	7.33 m
Triple jump	Marzouk Abdallah Al-Yoha (KUW)	16.06 m	Mohamed Abdelkader (EGY)	16.01 m	Sameh Farhan (KUW)	15.23 m
Shot put	Bilal Saad Mubarak (QAT)	16.92 m	Khaled Suliman Al-Khalidi (KSA)	16.78 m	Dhia Kamel Ahmed (EGY)	15.90 m
Discus throw	Mohamed Naguib Hamed (EGY)	55.54 m	Hassan Ahmed Hamad (EGY)	52.83 m	Khaled Suliman Al-Khalidi (KSA)	47.20 m
Hammer throw	Cherif El Hennawi (EGY)	67.08 m	Waleed Al-Bekheet (KUW)	62.94 m	Magdi Zakaria Abdallah (EGY)	60.08 m
Javelin throw	Ghanem Jaouhar (KUW)	64.98 m	Abdeladhim Aliouat (KSA)	63.96 m	Jaber Al-Shihabi (QAT)	60.00 m
Decathlon	Walid Zayed (QAT)	6503 pts	Issam El Azzazi (EGY)	6430 pts	Hassan Abu Najem (JOR)	6249 pts

- ^{nb} The marathon course was not the official 42.195 km distance so times were not eligible for records. The medals were still distributed.

=== Women ===
Event	Gold		Silver		Bronze	
100 metres	Karima Meskin Saad (EGY)	11.89	Rasha El Helou (SYR)	12.94	Nawal Zayoud (SYR)	13.01
200 metres	Karima Meskin Saad (EGY)	23.87	Rola Sannoufi (SYR)	26.65	Nawal Zayoud (SYR)	27.06
400 metres	Karima Meskin Saad (EGY)	54.5	Rola Sannoufi (SYR)	60.4	Fadia Othman (EGY)	63.4
800 metres	Karima Meskin Saad (EGY)	2:19.8	Huda Hashem Ismail (EGY)	2:27.2	Ôulaa El Halabi (SYR)	2:34.3
1500 metres	Mirvat Baas (SYR)	5:12.1	Njoud Etteer (SYR)	5:17.2	Salam Enneimat (JOR)	5:36.7
3000 metres	Mirvat Baas (SYR)	11:9.2	Njoud Etteer (SYR)	11:13.4	Salam Enneimat (JOR)	11:24.8
400 metres hurdles	Huda Hashem Ismail (EGY)	63.72	Samia Maâtouk (JOR)	74.95	Mona Ayash (SYR)	75.02
4×100 m relay	Syria (SYR)	50.41	Egypt (EGY)	54.24	Jordan (JOR)	54.40
4×400 m relay	Syria (SYR)	4:07.5	Jordan (JOR)	4:43.5	Palestine (PLE)	4:59.5
10,000 m track walk	Amani Adel (EGY)	54:56.6	Nesrine Abdallah (PLE)	1:02:11.9	Ibtissem Zaouan (SYR)	1:02:58.4
High jump	Ghada Shouaa (SYR)	1.60 m	Hala Al Saka (SYR)	1.55 m	Samia Maâtouk (JOR)	1.45 m
Long jump	Ghada Shouaa (SYR)	5.50 m	Hala Al Saka (SYR)	5.42 m	Samia Maâtouk (JOR)	4.79 m
Shot put	Hanan Ahmed Khaled (EGY)	14.50 m	Hiba Meshili Abu Zaghari (EGY)	11.71 m	Shahla Dermesh (SYR)	11.52 m
Discus throw	Hanan Ahmed Khaled (EGY)	48.00 m	Hiba Meshili Abu Zaghari (EGY)	40.88 m	Janette Ayoub (LIB)	35.52 m
Javelin throw	Ghada Shouaa (SYR)	41.92 m	Fidela Khoury (SYR)	38.22 m	Hiba Meshili Abu Zaghari (EGY)	33.44 m
Heptathlon	Huda Hashem Ismail (EGY)	4810 pts	Hala Al Saka (SYR)	4066 pts	Amina Dbeib (PLE)	2154 pts

== Medal table ==
=== Overall ===
Rank	Nation	Gold	Silver	Bronze	Total
1	Syria	12	13	12	37
2	Egypt (EGY)	11	8	5	24
3	Qatar (QAT)	11	3	4	18
4	Kuwait (KUW)	2	1	4	7
5	Jordan (JOR)	1	5	9	15
6	Bahrain (BHR)	1	1	0	2
6	United Arab Emirates (UAE)	1	1	0	2
8	Saudi Arabia (KSA)	0	4	1	5
9	Oman (OMN)	0	2	0	2
10	Palestine (PLE)	0	1	2	3
11	Lebanon (LIB)	0	0	1	1
12	Libya	0	0	0	0
12	Yemen (YEM)	0	0	0	0
Totals (13 entries)		39	39	38	116

=== Men ===
Rank	Nation	Gold	Silver	Bronze	Total
1	Qatar (QAT)	11	3	4	18
2	Syria	5	4	6	15
3	Egypt (EGY)	2	4	4	10
4	Kuwait (KUW)	2	1	4	7
5	Jordan (JOR)	1	3	3	7
6	Bahrain (BHR)	1	1	0	2
6	United Arab Emirates (UAE)	1	1	0	2
8	Saudi Arabia (KSA)	0	4	1	5
9	Oman (OMN)	0	2	0	2
10	Lebanon (LIB)	0	0	0	0
10	Libya	0	0	0	0
10	Palestine (PLE)	0	0	0	0
10	Yemen (YEM)	0	0	0	0
Totals (13 entries)		23	23	22	68

=== Women ===
Rank	Nation	Gold	Silver	Bronze	Total
1	Egypt (EGY)	9	4	1	14
2	Syria	7	9	6	22
3	Jordan (JOR)	0	2	6	8
4	Palestine (PLE)	0	1	2	3
5	Lebanon (LIB)	0	0	1	1
Totals (5 entries)		16	16	16	48
