= Fakhredin Fouad =

Jordanian high jumper (born 1967)

Fakhraldien Fuad Gor (Arabic: فخر الدين فؤاد; born October 23, 1967, Amman, Jordan), a Jordanian former athlete who specialized in the high jump.

While competing as a junior, he broke the Jordanian national record and was the first Jordanian to ever leap over 2.00m, followed that by breaking new barriers over 2.10m and 2.20m. Gor represented Jordan in the 1992 Summer Olympics, 1996 Summer Olympics, and three world championships (1987 World Championship, 1991 World Championship and 1993 World Championship). In 1999 he ended his career with 36 international and regional titles in addition to winning all national championships between 1986 and 1999, breaking the Jordanian National record 13 times, alone raising the bar 10 inches, settling at 7'5" since 1991.

In 1990 Gor received the gold medal of achievement from King Hussein of Jordan and was awarded the title of the best athlete in Jordan for 1990, 1991, 1997, 1999. In 1999 he received a National Cordon of Merit from King Abdullah II for winning two consecutive Pan Arab Games and breaking the Arab Games Record. Gor was also chosen as the athlete of the century for Jordan in the year 2000 by the Addustour newspaper. In 2003 Fouad was recognized by the League of Arab nations for exquisite athletic achievements for a quarter a century for Jordan and was presented with the league's medal in Cairo-Egypt in the presence of the Arab League and representatives from every Arab Nation.

Gor was the first Jordanian Athlete to be elected as a member of the board of directors for the Jordanian National Olympic Committee, the first Jordanian to be nominated for the international athletes' commission's election in Sydney Olympics 2000. Gor was also one of the founders of the Jordanian athletes' commission, and the Jordanian Olympians association and served on board of both, in addition, he was on the board of the Jordanian international athletes association and head of the cultural committee.

In 2004 Gor served as the head of the delegation for shooting to the world cup in Milan-Italy.

In 2013, he was ranked as number 1 in the United States and number 7 in the world in the Masters' Category.

== International competitions ==
- 1991 Arab Athletics Championships Gold Medalist
- 1993 Arab Athletics Championships Bronze Medalist
- 1995 Arab Athletics Championships Silver Medalist
- 1997 Arab Athletics Championships Gold Medalist
- 1997 Pan Arab Games Gold Medalist
- 1997 West Asian Games Gold Medalist/Games Record
- 1999 Pan Arab Games Gold Medalist/Games Record
