= Abdullah Al-Sheib =

Qatari long jumper

Abdullah Mohamed Al-Sheib
Personal information
- Nationality: Qatari
- Born: 29 June 1965 (age 60)

Sport
- Sport: Athletics
- Event: Long jump
Medal record
Men's athletics
Representing Qatar
Asian Championships
Bronze medal – third place	1989 New Delhi	High jump

Abdullah Mohamed Al-Sheib (Arabic: عبد الله محمد الشيب, born 29 June 1965) is a Qatari athlete. He competed in the men's long jump at the 1988 Summer Olympics and the 1992 Summer Olympics.
