= Ibrahim Mohamed Al-Ouiran =

Saudi Arabian discus thrower

Personal information
- Nationality: Saudi Arabian
- Born: 28 November 1962 (age 63)

Sport
- Sport: Athletics
- Event: Discus throw

Ibrahim Mohamed Al-Ouiran (born 28 November 1962) is a Saudi Arabian athlete. He competed in the men's discus throw at the 1988 Summer Olympics.
