= Khaled Al-Khalidi =

Saudi Arabian shot putter (born 1965)

Personal information
- Nationality: Saudi Arabia
- Born: 14 February 1965 (age 61)

Sport
- Sport: Athletics
- Event(s): Shot put Discus
Medal record
Men's athletics
Representing Saudi Arabia
Asian Championships
Silver medal – second place	1989 New Delhi	Shot put

Khaled Al-Khalidi (Arabic: خالد الخالدي; born 14 February 1965) is a Saudi Arabian athlete. He competed in the men's shot put at the 1992 Summer Olympics and the 1996 Summer Olympics.
