= Mohamed Bouhalla =

Algerian racewalker

Personal information
- Nationality: Algerian
- Born: 25 July 1963 (age 62)
- Height: 1.70 m (5 ft 7 in)
- Weight: 65 kg (143 lb)

Sport
- Sport: Athletics
- Event: Racewalking
Medal record
Men's athletics
Representing Algeria
African Championships
Gold medal – first place	1988 Annaba	20 km walk
Gold medal – first place	1989 Lagos	20 km walk

Mohamed Bouhalla (born 25 July 1963) is an Algerian racewalker. He competed in the men's 20 kilometres walk at the 1988 Summer Olympics.
