= Fadhel Khayati =

Tunisian hurdler (born 1965)

Fadhel Khayati (born 18 January 1965) is a retired Tunisian hurdler.

On the international and continental scene he won the gold medal at the 1994 Jeux de la Francophonie and finished fourth at the 1995 All-Africa Games. He also competed at the 1993 World Championships without reaching the final.

On the regional scene he won the gold medal (and also the gold medal in 110 m hurdles) at the 1984 Arab Junior Athletics Championships, and took the gold medals at the 1986 and 1990 Maghreb Championships. He finished fifth at the 1991 Mediterranean Games and won the bronze medal at the 1993 Mediterranean Games.

He became Tunisian champion at least twelve times. His personal best time was 49.52 seconds, achieved in July 1994 at the 1994 Jeux de la Francophonie.
