= Ghanem Zaid =

Kuwaiti javelin thrower

Personal information
- Nationality: Kuwaiti
- Born: 28 February 1965 (age 61)

Sport
- Sport: Athletics
- Event: Javelin throw
Medal record
Men's athletics
Representing Kuwait
Asian Championships
Silver medal – second place	1989 New Delhi	Javelin throw

Ghanem Zaid (born 28 February 1965) is a Kuwaiti athlete. He competed in the men's javelin throw at the 1988 Summer Olympics and the 1992 Summer Olympics.
